= List of members of the Parliament of Finland, 2019–2023 =

This article lists the members of the Parliament of Finland from 2019 to 2023. The 38th Parliament of Finland follows the parliamentary election held on 14 April 2019. There are 200 MPs in the Parliament.

== As elected ==
Name	Party	Constituency	Number of votes
Jussi Halla-aho	Finns Party	Helsinki	30,596
Li Andersson	Left Alliance	Finland Proper	24,542
Antti Häkkänen	National Coalition Party	South-Eastern Finland	20,234
Pekka Haavisto	Green League	Helsinki	20,163
Elina Lepomäki	National Coalition Party	Uusimaa	19,292
Sanna Marin	Social Democratic Party of Finland	Pirkanmaa	19,088
Juha Sipilä	Centre Party	Oulu	16,688
Ville Tavio	Finns Party	Finland Proper	14,957
Anna-Maja Henriksson	Swedish People's Party of Finland	Vaasa	14,545
Antti Lindtman	Social Democratic Party of Finland	Uusimaa	14,541
Kai Mykkänen	National Coalition Party	Uusimaa	14,226
Mauri Peltokangas	Finns Party	Vaasa	13,114
Laura Huhtasaari	Finns Party	Satakunta	12,991
Hjallis Harkimo	Movement Now	Uusimaa	12,963
Ben Zyskowicz	National Coalition Party	Helsinki	12,556
Sari Essayah	Christian Democrats	Savonia-Karelia	12,397
Antti Rinne	Social Democratic Party of Finland	Uusimaa	12,110
Maria Ohisalo	Green League	Helsinki	11,897
Hanna Sarkkinen	Left Alliance	Oulu	11,153
Sami Savio	Finns Party	Pirkanmaa	11,112
Tuula Haatainen	Social Democratic Party of Finland	Helsinki	11,100
Mats Löfström	Åland representative	Åland	11,051
Jutta Urpilainen	Social Democratic Party of Finland	Vaasa	11,010
Petteri Orpo	National Coalition Party	Finland Proper	10,792
Vilhelm Junnila	Finns Party	Finland Proper	10,788
Antti Kaikkonen	Centre Party	Uusimaa	10,757
Joakim Strand	Swedish People's Party of Finland	Vaasa	10,596
Jaana Pelkonen	National Coalition Party	Helsinki	10,563
Juho Eerola	Finns Party	South-Eastern Finland	10,441
Kristiina Salonen	Social Democratic Party of Finland	Satakunta	10,430
Maria Guzenina	Social Democratic Party of Finland	Uusimaa	10,005
Paula Risikko	National Coalition Party	Vaasa	9,891
Leena Meri	Finns Party	Uusimaa	9,807
Ilmari Nurminen	Social Democratic Party of Finland	Pirkanmaa	9,712
Eveliina Heinäluoma	Social Democratic Party of Finland	Helsinki	9,465
Anders Adlercreutz	Swedish People's Party of Finland	Uusimaa	9,425
Tytti Tuppurainen	Social Democratic Party of Finland	Oulu	9,404
Annika Saarikko	Centre Party	Finland Proper	9,390
Sebastian Tynkkynen	Finns Party	Oulu	9,271
Marko Kilpi	National Coalition Party	Savonia-Karelia	9,208
Jenna Simula	Finns Party	Oulu	9,197
Anna-Kaisa Ikonen	National Coalition Party	Pirkanmaa	9,101
Hannakaisa Heikkinen	Centre Party	Savonia-Karelia	8,986
Aki Lindén	Social Democratic Party of Finland	Finland Proper	8,970
Riitta Mäkinen	Social Democratic Party of Finland	Central Finland	8,916
Pia Kauma	National Coalition Party	Uusimaa	8,597
Pia Viitanen	Social Democratic Party of Finland	Pirkanmaa	8,496
Katri Kulmuni	Centre Party	Lapland	8,423
Ville Skinnari	Social Democratic Party of Finland	Tavastia	8,319
Krista Kiuru	Social Democratic Party of Finland	Satakunta	8,281
Merja Mäkisalo-Ropponen	Social Democratic Party of Finland	Savonia-Karelia	8,248
Juhana Vartiainen	National Coalition Party	Helsinki	8,206
Anne Kalmari	Centre Party	Central Finland	8,192
Teuvo Hakkarainen	Finns Party	Central Finland	8,036
Sirpa Paatero	Social Democratic Party of Finland	South-Eastern Finland	7,864
Lulu Ranne	Finns Party	Tavastia	7,812
Mikko Ollikainen	Swedish People's Party of Finland	Vaasa	7,755
Sari Multala	National Coalition Party	Uusimaa	7,724
Ritva Elomaa	Finns Party	Finland Proper	7,688
Mika Niikko	Finns Party	Uusimaa	7,613
Jari Leppä	Centre Party	South-Eastern Finland	7,458
Heikki Vestman	National Coalition Party	Uusimaa	7,429
Sanni Grahn-Laasonen	National Coalition Party	Tavastia	7,419
Sofia Vikman	National Coalition Party	Pirkanmaa	7,406
Eeva-Johanna Eloranta	Social Democratic Party of Finland	Finland Proper	7,358
Marko Asell	Social Democratic Party of Finland	Pirkanmaa	7,353
Ilkka Kanerva	National Coalition Party	Finland Proper	7,350
Rami Lehto	Finns Party	Tavastia	7,297
Terhi Koulumies	National Coalition Party	Helsinki	7,233
Anne-Mari Virolainen	National Coalition Party	Finland Proper	7,218
Tarja Filatov	Social Democratic Party of Finland	Tavastia	7,213
Jani Mäkelä	Finns Party	South-Eastern Finland	7,147
Mari Holopainen	Green League	Helsinki	7,094
Merja Kyllönen	Left Alliance	Oulu	7,068
Anna Kontula	Left Alliance	Pirkanmaa	6,946
Juha Mäenpää	Finns Party	Vaasa	6,915
Aino-Kaisa Pekonen	Left Alliance	Tavastia	6,872
Sari Sarkomaa	National Coalition Party	Helsinki	6,806
Mai Kivelä	Left Alliance	Helsinki	6,790
Paavo Arhinmäki	Left Alliance	Pirkanmaa	6,775
Kim Berg	Social Democratic Party of Finland	Vaasa	6,734
Johanna Ojala-Niemelä	Social Democratic Party of Finland	Lapland	6,719
Eeva Kalli	Centre Party	Satakunta	6,717
Emma Kari	Green League	Helsinki	6,716
Sinuhe Wallinheimo	National Coalition Party	Central Finland	6,695
Päivi Räsänen	Christian Democrats	Tavastia	6,616
Pasi Kivisaari	Centre Party	Vaasa	6,594
Mikko Kärnä	Centre Party	Lapland	6,480
Sari Tanus	Christian Democrats	Pirkanmaa	6,476
Anneli Kiljunen	Social Democratic Party of Finland	South-Eastern Finland	6,419
Peter Östman	Christian Democrats	Vaasa	6,378
Pirkka-Pekka Petelius	Green League	Uusimaa	6,331
Pauli Kiuru	National Coalition Party	Pirkanmaa	6,295
Seppo Eskelinen	Social Democratic Party of Finland	Savonia-Karelia	6,245
Inka Hopsu	Green League	Uusimaa	6,211
Krista Mikkonen	Green League	Savonia-Karelia	6,204
Thomas Blomqvist	Swedish People's Party of Finland	Uusimaa	6,137
Mikko Kinnunen	Centre Party	Oulu	6,132
Juha Pylväs	Centre Party	Oulu	6,100
Suna Kymäläinen	Social Democratic Party of Finland	South-Eastern Finland	6,076
Paula Werning	Social Democratic Party of Finland	South-Eastern Finland	6,074
Jari Ronkainen	Finns Party	Tavastia	6,038
Mika Lintilä	Centre Party	Vaasa	6,005
Outi Alanko-Kahiluoto	Green League	Helsinki	5,961
Riikka Purra	Finns Party	Uusimaa	5,960
Kalle Jokinen	National Coalition Party	Tavastia	5,934
Wille Rydman	National Coalition Party	Helsinki	5,910
Mari-Leena Talvitie	National Coalition Party	Oulu	5,909
Anders Norrback	Swedish People's Party of Finland	Vaasa	5,882
Olli Immonen	Finns Party	Oulu	5,856
Veronika Honkasalo	Left Alliance	Helsinki	5,846
Niina Malm	Social Democratic Party of Finland	South-Eastern Finland	5,815
Sanna Antikainen	Finns Party	Savonia-Karelia	5,805
Kaisa Juuso	Finns Party	Lapland	5,767
Jussi Wihonen	Finns Party	Savonia-Karelia	5,748
Katja Taimela	Social Democratic Party of Finland	Finland Proper	5,736
Hanna-Leena Mattila	Centre Party	Oulu	5,726
Johannes Koskinen	Social Democratic Party of Finland	Tavastia	5,717
Mikko Savola	Centre Party	Vaasa	5,713
Mika Kari	Social Democratic Party of Finland	Tavastia	5,676
Mia Laiho	National Coalition Party	Uusimaa	5,664
Veronica Rehn-Kivi	Swedish People's Party of Finland	Uusimaa	5,660
Kristian Sheikki Laakso	Finns Party	South-Eastern Finland	5,647
Timo Heinonen	National Coalition Party	Tavastia	5,629
Hanna Kosonen	Centre Party	South-Eastern Finland	5,583
Markus Mustajärvi	Left Alliance	Lapland	5,528
Arto Pirttilahti	Centre Party	Pirkanmaa	5,506
Anu Vehviläinen	Centre Party	Savonia-Karelia	5,504
Arja Juvonen	Finns Party	Uusimaa	5,490
Heikki Autto	National Coalition Party	Lapland	5,467
Antti Kurvinen	Centre Party	Vaasa	5,459
Eva Biaudet	Swedish People's Party of Finland	Helsinki	5,448
Timo Harakka	Social Democratic Party of Finland	Uusimaa	5,436
Ari Koponen	Finns Party	Uusimaa	5,383
Jouni Ovaska	Centre Party	Pirkanmaa	5,360
Matti Vanhanen	Centre Party	Uusimaa	5,276
Arto Satonen	National Coalition Party	Pirkanmaa	5,126
Ville Vähämäki	Finns Party	Oulu	5,072
Erkki Tuomioja	Social Democratic Party of Finland	Helsinki	5,044
Markus Lohi	Centre Party	Lapland	4,969
Matias Marttinen	National Coalition Party	Satakunta	4,925
Minna Reijonen	Finns Party	Savonia-Karelia	4,874
Iiris Suomela	Green League	Tavastia	4,873
Sakari Puisto	Finns Party	Pirkanmaa	4,837
Satu Hassi	Green League	Pirkanmaa	4,835
Hannu Hoskonen	Centre Party	Savonia-Karelia	4,832
Jukka Gustafsson	Social Democratic Party of Finland	Pirkanmaa	4,814
Atte Harjanne	Green League	Helsinki	4,795
Noora Koponen	Green League	Uusimaa	4,748
Kimmo Kiljunen	Social Democratic Party of Finland	Uusimaa	4,646
Petri Honkonen	Centre Party	Central Finland	4,639
Veikko Vallin	Finns Party	Pirkanmaa	4,567
Saara-Sofia Sirén	National Coalition Party	Finland Proper	4,553
Ruut Sjöblom	National Coalition Party	Uusimaa	4,518
Mikko Lundén	Finns Party	Finland Proper	4,500
Antti Rantakangas	Centre Party	Oulu	4,478
Saara Hyrkkö	Green League	Uusimaa	4,471
Pekka Aittakumpu	Centre Party	Oulu	4,469
Ari Torniainen	Centre Party	South-Eastern Finland	4,441
Bella Forsgrén	Green League	Central Finland	4,354
Jari Koskela	Finns Party	Satakunta	4,324
Sofia Virta	Green League	Finland Proper	4,289
Riikka Slunga-Poutsalo	Finns Party	Uusimaa	4,266
Hussein al-Taee	Social Democratic Party of Finland	Uusimaa	4,246
Johan Kvarnström	Social Democratic Party of Finland	Uusimaa	4,219
Kari Tolvanen	National Coalition Party	Uusimaa	4,212
Tiina Elo	Green League	Uusimaa	4,190
Hanna Huttunen	Centre Party	Savonia-Karelia	4,162
Katja Hänninen	Left Alliance	Oulu	4,145
Janne Heikkinen	National Coalition Party	Oulu	4,136
Jukka Kopra	National Coalition Party	South-Eastern Finland	4,025
Jari Myllykoski	Left Alliance	Satakunta	4,001
Tuula Väätäinen	Social Democratic Party of Finland	Savonia-Karelia	3,984
Juho Kautto	Left Alliance	Central Finland	3,866
Jukka Mäkynen	Finns Party	Vaasa	3,864
Esko Kiviranta	Centre Party	Finland Proper	3,828
Ville Kaunisto	National Coalition Party	South-Eastern Finland	3,717
Veijo Niemi	Finns Party	Pirkanmaa	3,709
Jenni Pitko	Green League	Oulu	3,614
Hilkka Kemppi	Centre Party	Tavastia	3,600
Jussi Saramo	Left Alliance	Uusimaa	3,502
Antero Laukkanen	Christian Democrats	Uusimaa	3,499
Matti Semi	Left Alliance	Savonia-Karelia	3,468
Pihla Keto-Huovinen	National Coalition Party	Uusimaa	3,412
Piritta Rantanen	Social Democratic Party of Finland	Central Finland	3,309
Joonas Könttä	Centre Party	Central Finland	3,303
Heli Järvinen	Green League	South-Eastern Finland	3,275
Ano Turtiainen	Finns Party	South-Eastern Finland	3,264
Markku Eestilä	National Coalition Party	Savonia-Karelia	3,035
Sandra Bergqvist	Swedish People's Party of Finland	Finland Proper	2,983
Janne Sankelo	National Coalition Party	Vaasa	2,930
Mari Rantanen	Finns Party	Helsinki	2,924
Jouni Kotiaho	Finns Party	Central Finland	2,881
Raimo Piirainen	Social Democratic Party of Finland	Oulu	2,791
Hanna Holopainen	Green League	South-Eastern Finland	2,659
Johannes Yrttiaho	Left Alliance	Finland Proper	2,636
Pia Lohikoski	Left Alliance	Uusimaa	2,544
Mirka Soinikoski	Green League	Tavastia	2,320
Heidi Viljanen	Social Democratic Party of Finland	Satakunta	2,169
Tom Packalén	Finns Party	Helsinki	2,028
Source: Finnish Election Commission: Elected

== Midterm replacements ==
- Jussi Halla-Aho (Finns Party) was substituted by Mika Raatikainen from 23 April 2019 to 2 July 2019.
- Merja Kyllönen (Left Alliance) was substituted by Risto Kalliorinne from 23 April 2019 to 2 July 2019.
- Teuvo Hakkarainen (Finns Party) was replaced by Toimi Kankaanniemi on 2 July 2019.
- Laura Huhtasaari (Finns Party) was replaced by Petri Huru on 2 July 2019.
- Antti Rantakangas (Centre Party) was replaced by Tuomas Kettunen on 28 November 2019.
- Jutta Urpilainen (SDP) was replaced by Matias Mäkynen on 3 December 2019.
- Paavo Arhinmäki (Left Alliance) was replaced by Suldaan Said Ahmed on 9 September 2021.
