= List of members of the Parliament of Finland, 2015–2019 =

This article lists the members of the Parliament of Finland from 2015 to 2019. The 37th eduskunta follows the parliamentary election held on 19 April 2015. There are 200 MPs in the Parliament.

== As elected ==
The parties attributed to certain members of Parliament are those to which said MPs belonged on the day of the election. Therefore, for example, members of Blue Reform are listed as being part of the Finns Party, as that was the case on 19 April 2015.

Name	Party	Constituency	Number of votes
Juha Sipilä	Centre Party	Oulu	30,758
Timo Soini	Finns Party	Satakunta	29,527
Alexander Stubb	National Coalition Party	Satakunta	27,129
Carl Haglund	Swedish People's Party of Finland	Satakunta	21,468
Jaana Pelkonen	National Coalition Party	Helsinki	15,964
Ben Zyskowicz	National Coalition Party	Helsinki	15,395
Li Andersson	Left Alliance	Finland Proper	15,071
Pekka Haavisto	Green League	Helsinki	14,204
Antti Rinne	Social Democratic Party of Finland	Satakunta	12,147
Jussi Niinistö	Finns Party	Satakunta	11,767
Jutta Urpilainen	Social Democratic Party of Finland	Vaasa	11,627
Juhana Vartiainen	National Coalition Party	Helsinki	11,436
Harry Harkimo	National Coalition Party	Satakunta	11,416
Matti Vanhanen	Centre Party	Satakunta	11,304
Sari Essayah	Christian Democrats	Savonia-Karelia	11,186
Erkki Tuomioja	Social Democratic Party of Finland	Helsinki	11,154
Sanna Marin	Social Democratic Party of Finland	Pirkanmaa	10,911
Hannakaisa Heikkinen	Centre Party	Savonia-Karelia	10,712
Antti Lindtman	Social Democratic Party of Finland	Satakunta	10,687
Anna-Maja Henriksson	Swedish People's Party of Finland	Vaasa	10,673
Petteri Orpo	National Coalition Party	Finland Proper	10,652
Antti Kaikkonen	Centre Party	Satakunta	10,617
Annika Saarikko	Centre Party	Finland Proper	10,510
Joakim Strand	Swedish People's Party of Finland	Vaasa	10,374
Lauri Ihalainen	Social Democratic Party of Finland	Central Finland	10,354
Anne Kalmari	Centre Party	Central Finland	10,216
Sampo Terho	Finns Party	Helsinki	10,067
Jari Lindström	Finns Party	South-Eastern Finland	9,966
Paula Risikko	National Coalition Party	Vaasa	9,812
Stefan Wallin	Swedish People's Party of Finland	Finland Proper	9,787
Sirpa Paatero	Social Democratic Party of Finland	South-Eastern Finland	9,764
Eero Heinäluoma	Social Democratic Party of Finland	Helsinki	9,703
Katri Kulmuni	Centre Party	Lapland	9,702
Anne Berner	Centre Party	Satakunta	9,691
Hanna Sarkkinen	Left Alliance	Oulu	9,582
"Kike" Ritva Elomaa	Finns Party	Finland Proper	9,571
Kristiina Salonen	Social Democratic Party of Finland	Satakunta	9,560
Sofia Vikman	National Coalition Party	Pirkanmaa	9,473
Tapani Tölli	Centre Party	Oulu	9,369
Jari Leppä	Centre Party	South-Eastern Finland	9,362
Laura Huhtasaari	Finns Party	Satakunta	9,259
Kimmo Tiilikainen	Centre Party	South-Eastern Finland	9,193
Ilkka Kanerva	National Coalition Party	Finland Proper	9,183
Mauri Pekkarinen	Centre Party	Central Finland	9,170
Anu Vehviläinen	Centre Party	Savonia-Karelia	8,924
Ville Niinistö	Green League	Finland Proper	8,835
Maarit Feldt-Ranta	Social Democratic Party of Finland	Satakunta	8,749
Vesa-Matti Saarakkala	Finns Party	Vaasa	8,529
Mikko Savola	Centre Party	Vaasa	8,476
Pia Viitanen	Social Democratic Party of Finland	Pirkanmaa	8,472
Juho Eerola	Finns Party	South-Eastern Finland	8,320
Tarja Filatov	Social Democratic Party of Finland	Tavastia	8,318
Hanna Mäntylä	Finns Party	Lapland	8,072
Paavo Arhinmäki	Left Alliance	Helsinki	7,910
Outi Alanko-Kahiluoto	Green League	Helsinki	7,884
Maria Guzenina	Social Democratic Party of Finland	Satakunta	7,827
Anna Kontula	Left Alliance	Pirkanmaa	7,769
Tuomo Puumala	Centre Party	Vaasa	7,762
Tytti Tuppurainen	Social Democratic Party of Finland	Oulu	7,661
Krista Kiuru	Social Democratic Party of Finland	Satakunta	7,561
Sanni Grahn-Laasonen	National Coalition Party	Tavastia	7,556
Päivi Räsänen	Christian Democrats	Tavastia	7,545
Suna Kymäläinen	Social Democratic Party of Finland	South-Eastern Finland	7,435
Anne-Mari Virolainen	National Coalition Party	Finland Proper	7,169
Elsi Katainen	Centre Party	Savonia-Karelia	7,084
Sari Sarkomaa	National Coalition Party	Helsinki	7,052
Lasse Hautala	Centre Party	Vaasa	7,037
Seppo Kääriäinen	Centre Party	Savonia-Karelia	7,006
Kaj Turunen	Finns Party	South-Eastern Finland	6,929
Paavo Väyrynen	Independent	Lapland	6,889
Mika Kari	Social Democratic Party of Finland	Tavastia	6,867
Antero Vartia	Green League	Helsinki	6,859
Ville Tavio	Finns Party	Finland Proper	6,847
Olli Rehn	Centre Party	Helsinki	6,837
Jukka Gustafsson	Social Democratic Party of Finland	Pirkanmaa	6,792
Mikko Alatalo	Centre Party	Pirkanmaa	6,759
Anne Louhelainen	Finns Party	Tavastia	6,743
Reijo Hongisto	Finns Party	Vaasa	6,736
Rami Lehto	Finns Party	Tavastia	6,705
Eeva-Johanna Eloranta	Social Democratic Party of Finland	Finland Proper	6,689
Tuula Haatainen	Social Democratic Party of Finland	Helsinki	6,662
Hannu Hoskonen	Centre Party	Savonia-Karelia	6,633
Arto Pirttilahti	Centre Party	Pirkanmaa	6,629
Hanna Kosonen	Centre Party	South-Eastern Finland	6,600
Outi Mäkelä	National Coalition Party	Satakunta	6,598
Peter Östman	Christian Democrats	Vaasa	6,577
Pirkko Mattila	Finns Party	Oulu	6,570
Jani Toivola	Green League	Satakunta	6,557
Elina Lepomäki	National Coalition Party	Satakunta	6,541
Kari Tolvanen	National Coalition Party	Satakunta	6,531
Toimi Kankaanniemi	Finns Party	Central Finland	6,511
Thomas Blomqvist	Swedish People's Party of Finland	Satakunta	6,443
Juha Rehula	Centre Party	Tavastia	6,429
Satu Hassi	Green League	Pirkanmaa	6,332
Pentti Oinonen	Finns Party	Savonia-Karelia	6,283
Timo Heinonen	National Coalition Party	Tavastia	6,274
Markku Pakkanen	Centre Party	South-Eastern Finland	6,265
Johanna Ojala-Niemelä	Social Democratic Party of Finland	Lapland	6,248
Antti Häkkänen	National Coalition Party	South-Eastern Finland	6,216
Silvia Modig	Left Alliance	Helsinki	6,190
Lea Mäkipää	Finns Party	Pirkanmaa	6,124
Sari Multala	National Coalition Party	Satakunta	6,118
Katja Taimela	Social Democratic Party of Finland	Finland Proper	6,017
Jani Mäkelä	Finns Party	South-Eastern Finland	6,102
Katja Hänninen	Left Alliance	Oulu	6,007
Esko Kiviranta	Centre Party	Finland Proper	5,994
Antti Rantakangas	Centre Party	Oulu	5,960
Ilkka Kantola	Social Democratic Party of Finland	Finland Proper	5,908
Juha Pylväs	Centre Party	Oulu	5,861
Antti Kurvinen	Centre Party	Vaasa	5,838
Ari Jalonen	Finns Party	Satakunta	5,753
Markus Mustajärvi	Left Alliance	Lapland	5,743
Kalle Jokinen	National Coalition Party	Tavastia	5,728
Pauli Kiuru	National Coalition Party	Pirkanmaa	5,726
Ville Skinnari	Social Democratic Party of Finland	Tavastia	5,711
Niilo Keränen	Centre Party	Oulu	5,696
Maria Lohela	Finns Party	Finland Proper	5,583
Teuvo Hakkarainen	Finns Party	Central Finland	5,557
Eva Biaudet	Swedish People's Party of Finland	Helsinki	5,515
Eeva-Maria Maijala	Centre Party	Lapland	5,515
Timo Harakka	Social Democratic Party of Finland	Satakunta	5,497
Aino-Kaisa Pekonen	Left Alliance	Tavastia	5,487
Sinuhe Wallinheimo	National Coalition Party	Central Finland	5,483
Harri Jaskari	National Coalition Party	Pirkanmaa	5,471
Mikaela Nylander	Swedish People's Party of Finland	Satakunta	5,422
Mirja Vehkaperä	Centre Party	Oulu	5,420
Anneli Kiljunen	Social Democratic Party of Finland	South-Eastern Finland	5,418
Satu Taavitsainen	Social Democratic Party of Finland	South-Eastern Finland	5,416
Ari Torniainen	Centre Party	South-Eastern Finland	5,412
Arto Satonen	National Coalition Party	Pirkanmaa	5,339
Sami Savio	Finns Party	Pirkanmaa	5,270
Kai Mykkänen	National Coalition Party	Satakunta	5,260
Mika Lintilä	Centre Party	Vaasa	5,243
Mats Löfström	Åland representative	Åland	5,217
Sirkka-Liisa Anttila	Centre Party	Tavastia	5,200
Mats Nylund	Swedish People's Party of Finland	Vaasa	5,189
Kari Kulmala	Finns Party	Savonia-Karelia	5,188
Timo Korhonen	Centre Party	Oulu	5,180
Nasima Razmyar	Social Democratic Party of Finland	Helsinki	5,156
Kimmo Kivelä	Finns Party	Savonia-Karelia	5,145
Tom Packalén	Finns Party	Helsinki	5,089
Ilmari Nurminen	Social Democratic Party of Finland	Pirkanmaa	5,079
Martti Mölsä	Finns Party	Pirkanmaa	5,048
Lenita Toivakka	National Coalition Party	South-Eastern Finland	5,028
Annika Lapintie	Left Alliance	Finland Proper	5,027
Joona Räsänen	Social Democratic Party of Finland	Satakunta	5,024
Susanna Huovinen	Social Democratic Party of Finland	Central Finland	5,003
Jyrki Kasvi	Green League	Satakunta	4,991
Olli Immonen	Finns Party	Oulu	4,964
Olavi Ala-Nissilä	Centre Party	Finland Proper	4,908
Merja Mäkisalo-Ropponen	Social Democratic Party of Finland	Savonia-Karelia	4,899
Riitta Myller	Social Democratic Party of Finland	Savonia-Karelia	4,825
Markus Lohi	Centre Party	Lapland	4,793
Jukka Kopra	National Coalition Party	South-Eastern Finland	4,677
Kauko Juhantalo	Centre Party	Satakunta	4,627
Saara-Sofia Sirén	National Coalition Party	Finland Proper	4,625
Harry Wallin	Social Democratic Party of Finland	Vaasa	4,608
Markku Eestilä	National Coalition Party	Savonia-Karelia	4,578
Sanna Lauslahti	National Coalition Party	Satakunta	4,576
Mari-Leena Talvitie	National Coalition Party	Oulu	4,556
Wille Rydman	National Coalition Party	Helsinki	4,524
Ulla Parviainen	Centre Party	Oulu	4,523
Pertti Salolainen	National Coalition Party	Helsinki	4,502
Maria Tolppanen	Finns Party	Vaasa	5,476
Marisanna Jarva	Centre Party	Oulu	5,347
Hanna Halmeenpää	Green League	Oulu	4,860
Pertti Hakanen	Centre Party	Pirkanmaa	4,709
Emma Kari	Green League	Helsinki	4,647
Krista Mikkonen	Green League	Savonia-Karelia	4,624
Markku Rossi	Centre Party	Savonia-Karelia	4,482
Jari Ronkainen	Finns Party	Tavastia	4,442
Olli-Poika Parviainen	Green League	Pirkanmaa	4,437
Johanna Karimäki	Green League	Satakunta	4,341
Eero Lehti	National Coalition Party	Satakunta	4,385
Touko Aalto	Green League	Central Finland	4,326
Mika Niikko	Finns Party	Satakunta	4,273
Timo Kalli	Centre Party	Satakunta	4,215
Ozan Yanar	Green League	Helsinki	4,196
Jari Myllykoski	Left Alliance	Satakunta	4,175
Tiina Elovaara	Finns Party	Pirkanmaa	4,107
Sari Raassina	National Coalition Party	Savonia-Karelia	3,978
Martti Talja	Centre Party	Tavastia	3,941
Aila Paloniemi	Centre Party	Central Finland	3,861
Ville Vähämäki	Finns Party	Oulu	3,798
Heli Järvinen	Green League	South-Eastern Finland	3,580
Jaana Laitinen-Pesola	National Coalition Party	Satakunta	3,483
Mika Raatikainen	Finns Party	Helsinki	3,370
Anders Adlercreutz	Swedish People's Party of Finland	Satakunta	3,337
Eero Suutari	National Coalition Party	Oulu	3,303
Pirkko Ruohonen-Lerner	Finns Party	Satakunta	3,301
Kari Uotila	Left Alliance	Uusimaa	3,152
Susanna Koski	National Coalition Party	Vaasa	3,102
Petri Honkonen	Centre Party	Central Finland	2,978
Arja Juvonen	Finns Party	Satakunta	2,931
Simon Elo	Finns Party	Satakunta	2,907
Eerikki Viljanen	Centre Party	Satakunta	2,902
Sari Tanus	Christian Democrats	Pirkanmaa	2,592
Veera Ruoho	Finns Party	Satakunta	2,563
Antero Laukkanen	Christian Democrats	Satakunta	2,520
Matti Semi	Left Alliance	Savonia-Karelia	2,140
Source: Finnish Election Commission

== Midterm replacements ==
- Paavo Väyrynen (Centre Party) was replaced by Mikko Kärnä of the same party on 30 April 2015.
- Pirkko Ruohonen-Lerner (Finns Party) was replaced by Leena Meri of the same party on 7 May 2015.
- Carl Haglund (Swedish People's Party of Finland) was replaced by Veronica Rehn-Kivi of the same party on 1 August 2016.
- Olli Rehn (Centre Party) was replaced by Paula Lehtomäki of the same party on 1 February 2017.
- Paula Lehtomäki (Centre Party) was replaced by Pekka Puska of the same party on 9 February 2017.
- Nazima Razmyar (SDP) was replaced by Pilvi Torsti of the same party on 9 June 2017.
- Hanna Mäntylä (NA) was replaced by Matti Torvinen of the Finns Party on 1 July 2017.
- Alexander Stubb (National Coalition Party) was replaced by Pia Kauma of the same party on 1 August 2017.
- Elsi Katainen (Centre Party) was replaced by Eero Reijonen of the same party on 1 March 2018.
- Outi Mäkelä (National Coalition Party) was replaced by Mia Laiho of the same party on 5 March 2018.
- Sanna Lauslahti (National Coalition Party) was replaced by Raija Vahasalo of the same party on 10 April 2018.
- Mikko Kärnä (Centre Party) was replaced by Paavo Väyrynen of the Citizens' Party on 12 June 2018.
- Susanna Huovinen (SDP) was replaced by Riitta Mäkinen of the same party on 15 June 2018.
- Mirja Vehkaperä (Centre Party) was replaced by Eija Nivala of the same party on 18 June 2018.
- Eija Nivala (Centre Party) was replaced by Hanna-Leena Mattila of the same party on 25 June 2018.
