= List of members of the Parliament of Finland, 2011–2015 =

The 36th Eduskunta follows the parliamentary election held on 17 April 2011. There are 200 MPs in the parliament. The current government is 72nd in order, as there have been on average two governments per parliament.

== As elected ==
Name	Party	Constituency	Number of votes	Office
Timo Soini	True Finns	Uusimaa	43,437	Chairman of the Foreign Affairs Committee
Alexander Stubb	National Coalition Party	Uusimaa	41,768	Prime Minister
Jyrki Katainen	National Coalition Party	Uusimaa	23,962	
Paavo Arhinmäki	Left Alliance	Helsinki	17,226	Minister of Culture and Sport
Lauri Ihalainen	Social Democratic Party	Uusimaa	15,085	Minister of Labour
Jussi Halla-aho	True Finns	Helsinki	15,074	
Maria Guzenina-Richardson	Social Democratic Party	Uusimaa	14,581	Minister for Health and Social Services
Heli Paasio	Social Democratic Party	Finland Proper	13,958	
Ben Zyskowicz	National Coalition Party	Helsinki	13,407	
Ritva Elomaa	True Finns	Finland Proper	13,121	
Stefan Wallin	Swedish People's Party	Finland Proper	12,366	
Paula Risikko	National Coalition Party	Vaasa	11,907	Minister for Social Affairs and Health
Jutta Urpilainen	Social Democratic Party	Vaasa	11,670	Minister of Finance
Jan Vapaavuori	National Coalition Party	Helsinki	11,203	Minister of Economic Affairs
Petteri Orpo	National Coalition Party	Finland Proper	11,018	Chairman of the NCP parliamentary group
Hanna Tainio	Social Democratic Party	Pirkanmaa	10,400	
Anne-Mari Virolainen	National Coalition Party	Finland Proper	10,041	
Erkki Tuomioja	Social Democratic Party	Helsinki	9,970	Minister for Foreign Affairs
Tapani Tölli	Centre Party	Oulu	9,777	
Eero Heinäluoma	Social Democratic Party	Helsinki	9,501	Speaker of the Parliament
Anne Kalmari	Centre Party	Central Finland	9,288	
Laila Koskela	True Finns	Pirkanmaa	9,172	
Lea Mäkipää	True Finns	Pirkanmaa	9,034	
Pentti Oinonen	True Finns	Northern Savonia	8,920	
Mari Kiviniemi	Centre Party	Helsinki	8,812	
Katja Taimela	Social Democratic Party	Finland Proper	8,498	
Anna-Maja Henriksson	Swedish People's Party	Vaasa	8,392	Minister of Justice
Mikael Jungner	Social Democratic Party	Uusimaa	8,380	
Saara Karhu	Social Democratic Party	Pirkanmaa	8,327	
Anneli Kiljunen	Social Democratic Party	Kymi	8,294	
Osmo Soininvaara	Green League	Helsinki	8,285	
Sofia Vikman	National Coalition Party	Pirkanmaa	8,279	
Vesa-Matti Saarakkala	True Finns	Vaasa	8,276	
Susanna Huovinen	Social Democratic Party	Central Finland	8,271	
Tuija Brax	Green League	Uusimaa	7,882	Chairwoman of the Audit Committee
Merja Kyllönen	Left Alliance	Oulu	7,837	Minister of Transport
Ilkka Kanerva	National Coalition Party	Finland Proper	7,820	
Pia Viitanen	Social Democratic Party	Pirkanmaa	7,786	
Krista Kiuru	Social Democratic Party	Satakunta	7,730	Minister for Housing and Communications
Annika Lapintie	Left Alliance	Finland Proper	7,723	Chairwoman of the Left Alliance parliamentary group
Riita Myller	Social Democratic Party	North Karelia	7,700	
Markus Mustajärvi	Left Alliance	Lapland	7,621	Mustajärvi was expelled from the Left Alliance parliamentary group on 30 June 2011. They later founded a parliamentary group called Left Group (which, however, is not a party).
Johannes Koskinen	Social Democratic Party	Tavastia	7,603	Chairman of the Constitutional Law Committee
Maarit Feldt-Ranta	Social Democratic Party	Uusimaa	7,546	
Anni Sinnemäki	Green League	Helsinki	7,513	
Pekka Haavisto	Green League	Helsinki	7,470	Chairman of the Green League parliamentary group
Sari Sarkomaa	National Coalition Party	Helsinki	7,457	
Reijo Hongisto	True Finns	Vaasa	7,444	
Oras Tynkkynen	Green League	Pirkanmaa	7,406	
Thomas Blomqvist	Swedish People's Party	Uusimaa	7,362	
Paula Lehtomäki	Centre Party	Uusimaa	7,356	
Miapetra Kumpula-Natri	Social Democratic Party	Uusimaa	7,324	
Henna Virkkunen	National Coalition Party	Central Finland	7,127	Minister of Public Administration and Local Government
Kristiina Salonen	Social Democratic Party	Satakunta	7,124	
Mauri Pekkarinen	Centre Party	Central Finland	7,112	Chairman of the Commerce Committee
Jyri Häkämies	National Coalition Party	Kymi	7,098	
Kimmo Tiilikainen	Centre Party	Kymi	7,094	Chairman of the Centre Party parliamentary group
Seppo Kääriäinen	Centre Party	Northern Savonia	7,061	
Johanna Ojala-Niemelä	Social Democratic Party	Lapland	7,052	
Arto Satonen	National Coalition Party	Pirkanmaa	7,021	Chairman of the Transport and Communications Committee
Päivi Räsänen	Christian Democrats	Tavastia	6,995	Minister of the Interior
Antti Rantakangas	Centre Party	Oulu	6,994	
Elsi Katainen	Centre Party	Northern Savonia	6,960	
Elisabeth Nauclér	Swedish People's Party (Independent)	Åland	6,925	
Tuomo Puumala	Centre Party	Vaasa	6,898	
Mirja Vehkaperä	Centre Party	Oulu	6,852	
Jukka Gustafsson	Social Democratic Party	Pirkanmaa	6,793	Minister of Education
Tarja Filatov	Social Democratic Party	Tavastia	6,782	Chairwoman of the Employment and Equality Committee
Kari Rajamäki	Social Democratic Party	Northern Savonia	6,776	
Ari Jalonen	True Finns	Satakunta	6,721	
Lasse Hautala	Centre Party	Vaasa	6,592	
Anssi Joutsenlahti	True Finns	Satakunta	6,583	2nd Deputy Speaker of the Parliament
Timo Heinonen	National Coalition Party	Tavastia	6,526	
Pertti Virtanen	True Finns	Pirkanmaa	6,526	
Sampsa Kataja	National Coalition Party	Satakunta	6,425	
Olli Immonen	True Finns	Oulu	6,419	
Pertti Hemmilä	National Coalition Party	Finland Proper	6,413	
Christina Gestrin	Swedish People's Party	Uusimaa	6,408	
Ilkka Kantola	Social Democratic Party	Finland Proper	6,339	
Anu Vehviläinen	Centre Party	North Karelia	6,296	
Inkeri Kerola	Centre Party	Oulu	6,289	
Pertti Salolainen	National Coalition Party	Helsinki	6,205	
Lauri Heikkilä	True Finns	Finland Proper	6,199	
Kimmo Sasi	National Coalition Party	Pirkanmaa	6,164	Chairman of the Finance Committee
Anne Louhelainen	True Finns	Tavastia	6,160	
Martti Korhonen	Left Alliance	Oulu	6,147	Chairman of the Environment Committee
Ulla-Maj Wideroos	Swedish People's Party	Vaasa	6,077	
Esko Kiviranta	Centre Party	Finland Proper	6,035	
Outi Mäkelä	National Coalition Party	Uusimaa	6,024	
Mikko Savola	Centre Party	Vaasa	5,985	
Jaana Pelkonen	National Coalition Party	Helsinki	5,897	
Sirkka-Liisa Anttila	Centre Party	Tavastia	5,882	
Kari Tolvanen	National Coalition Party	Uusimaa	5,879	
Sanni Grahn-Laasonen	National Coalition Party	Tavastia	5,866	
Lenita Toivakka	National Coalition Party	Southern Savonia	5,783	
Jouni Backman	Social Democratic Party	Southern Savonia	5,745	Chairman of the Social Democratic parliamentary group
Reijo Tossavainen	True Finns	Kymi	5,725	
Pekka Ravi	National Coalition Party	North Karelia	5,723	1st Deputy Speaker of the Parliament
Mats Nylund	Swedish People's Party	Vaasa	5,709	
Risto Kalliorinne	Left Alliance	Oulu	5,669	
Lars Gästgivars	Swedish People's Party	Vaasa	5,650	
Jari Leppä	Centre Party	Southern Savonia	5,570	Chairman of the Agriculture and Forestry Committee
Juha Sipilä	Centre Party	Oulu	5,543	
Juha Rehula	Centre Party	Tavastia	5,550	Chairman of the Social Affairs and Health Committee
Ville Vähämäki	True Finns	Oulu	5,534	
Arto Pirttilahti	Centre Party	Pirkanmaa	5,516	
James Hirvisaari	True Finns	Tavastia	5,498	Hirvisaari was expelled from the True Finns in October 2013, after which he joined the Change 2011 party.
Jari Lindström	True Finns	Kymi	5,450	
Sirpa Paatero	Social Democratic Party	Kymi	5,392	
Timo Korhonen	Centre Party	Oulu	5,369	
Ville Niinistö	Green League	Finland Proper	5,362	Minister of the Environment
Juha Eerola	True Finns	Kymi	5,350	
Peter Östman	Christian Democrats	Vaasa	5,349	Chairman of the Christian Democrats parliamentary group
Pauli Kiuru	National Coalition Party	Pirkanmaa	5,340	
Eero Reijonen	Centre Party	North Karelia	5,318	
Tytti Tuppurainen	Social Democratic Party	Oulu	5,313	
Mika Kari	Social Democratic Party	Tavastia	5,280	
Kalle Jokinen	National Coalition Party	Tavastia	5,271	
Outi Alanko-Kahiluoto	Green League	Helsinki	5,240	
Jouko Skinnari	Social Democratic Party	Tavastia	5,186	
Timo Kalli	Centre Party	Satakunta	5,163	
Ari Torniainen	Centre Party	Kymi	5,157	
Ismo Soukola	True Finns	Tavastia	5,059	
Mika Lintilä	Centre Party	Vaasa	5,035	
Heiki Autto	National Coalition Party	Lapland	5,025	
Astrid Thors	Swedish People's Party	Helsinki	4,983	
Kauko Tuupainen	True Finns	Central Finland	4,977	
Katri Komi	Centre Party	Southern Savonia	4,964	
Jussi Niinistö	True Finns	Uusimaa	4,911	Chairman of the Defence Committee
Mikaela Nylander	Swedish People's Party	Uusimaa	4,906	Chairwoman of the Swedish parliamentary group
Rakel Hiltunen	Social Democratic Party	Helsinki	4,882	
Maria Lohela	True Finns	Finland Proper	4,873	
Lasse Männistö	National Coalition Party	Helsinki	4,866	
Antti Lindtman	Social Democratic Party	Uusimaa	4,805	
Leena Harkimo	National Coalition Party	Uusimaa	4,782	
Eeva Maria Maijala	Centre Party	Lapland	4,692	
Silvia Modig	Left Alliance	Helsinki	4,681	
Osmo Kokko	True Finns	North Karelia	4,677	
Jyrki Yrttiaho	Left Alliance	Finland Proper	4,634	Yrttiaho was expelled from the Left Alliance parliamentary group on 30 June 2011. They later founded a parliamentary group called Left Group (which, however, is not a party).
Sari Palm	Christian Democrats	Kymi	4,621	
Tapani Mäkinen	National Coalition Party	Uusimaa	4,592	
Harri Jaskari	National Coalition Party	Pirkanmaa	4,556	
Pauliina Viitamies	Social Democratic Party	Southern Savonia	4,470	
Martti Mölsä	True Finns	Pirkanmaa	4,423	
Päivi Lipponen	Social Democratic Party	Helsinki	4,381	Chairwoman of the Committee for the Future
Tom Packalén	True Finns	Helsinki	4,380	
Kimmo Kivelä	True Finns	Northern Savonia	4,366	
Jukka Kärnä	Social Democratic Party	Kymi	4,325	
Merja Kuusisto	Social Democratic Party	Uusimaa	4,324	
Jukka Kopra	National Coalition Party	Kymi	4,303	
Anna Kontula	Left Alliance	Pirkanmaa	4,262	
Matti Saarinen	Social Democratic Party	Uusimaa	4,253	
Tuula Väätäinen	Social Democratic Party	Northern Savonia	4,244	
Sinuhe Wallinheimo	National Coalition Party	Central Finland	4,228	
Raija Vahasalo	National Coalition Party	Uusimaa	4,206	Chairwoman of the Education and Culture Committee
Raimo Piirainen	Social Democratic Party	Oulu	4,187	
Annika Saarikko	Centre Party	Finland Proper	4,185	
Jani Toivola	Green League	Uusimaa	4,174	
Aila Paloniemi	Centre Party	Central Finland	4,146	
Mikko Alatalo	Centre Party	Pirkanmaa	4,140	
Suna Kymäläinen	Social Democratic Party	Kymi	4,098	
Markku Rossi	Centre Party	Northern Savonia	4,068	
Jouko Jääskeläinen	Christian Democrats	Uusimaa	4,026	
Anna-Kaisa Pekonen	Left Alliance	Tavastia	4,010	
Eero Lehti	National Coalition Party	Uusimaa	3,993	
Pentti Kettunen	True Finns	Oulu	3,990	
Eila Tiainen	Left Alliance	Central Finland	3,955	
Anne Holmlund	National Coalition Party	Satakunta	3,952	Chairwoman of the Legal Affairs Committee
Pirkko Mattila	True Finns	Oulu	3,947	Chairwoman of the Administration Committee
Antti Kaikkonen	Centre Party	Uusimaa	3,929	
Johanna Karimäki	Green League	Uusimaa	3,887	
Sauli Ahvenjärvi	Christian Democrats	Satakunta	3,880	
Simo Rundgren	Centre Party	Lapland	3,825	
Markku Mäntymaa	National Coalition Party	Vaasa	3,806	
Janne Sankelo	National Coalition Party	Vaasa	3,792	
Eeva-Johanna Eloranta	Social Democratic Party	Finland Proper	3,648	
Markus Lohi	Centre Party	Lapland	3,615	
Pia Kauma	National Coalition Party	Uusimaa	3,551	
Esko Kurvinen	National Coalition Party	Oulu	3,546	
Leena Rauhala	Christian Democrats	Pirkanmaa	3,511	
Eero Suutari	National Coalition Party	Oulu	3,495	
Tuula Peltonen	Social Democratic Party	Central Finland	3,481	
Kari Uotila	Left Alliance	Uusimaa	3,468	
Markku Eestilä	National Coalition Party	Northern Savonia	3,428	
Teuvo Hakkarainen	True Finns	Central Finland	3,371	
Marjo Matikainen-Kallström	National Coalition Party	Uusimaa	3,360	
Jari Myllykoski	Left Alliance	Satakunta	3,321	
Sanna Lauslahti	National Coalition Party	Uusimaa	3,312	
Erkki Virtanen	Left Alliance	Northern Savonia	3,179	
Pirkko Ruohonen-Lerner	True Finns	Uusimaa	3,100	Chairwoman of the True Finns parliamentary group
Hanna Mäntylä	True Finns	Lapland	3,064	
Johanna Jurva	True Finns	Uusimaa	2,970	
Pietari Jääskeläinen	True Finns	Uusimaa	2,968	
Juha Väätäinen	True Finns	Helsinki	2,914	
Maria Tolppanen	True Finns	Vaasa	2,855	
Mika Niikko	True Finns	Uusimaa	2,703	
Kaj Turunen	True Finns	Southern Savonia	2,631	
Merja Mäkisalo-Ropponen	Social Democratic Party	North Karelia	2,519	
Arja Juvonen	True Finns	Uusimaa	2,553	
Satu Haapanen	Green League	Oulu	2,315	
Source: Finnish Election Commission 1, 2, Committee chairs, English names of the committees, Parliamentary group chairs, Speaker and deputy Speakers

The average age of elected MPs was 48. The youngest MP is Olli Immonen, 25 at the time of the election, and the oldest MP is Kauko Tuupainen, 70 at the time of the election – both are True Finns MPs.

The Parliament has 115 male MPs and 85 female MPs. Of the parties the True Finns have the highest portion of male MPs in their ranks (72%), while the Social Democratic Party has the highest portion of female MPs (64%).

== Government formation ==
As the leader of the largest party Jyrki Katainen of the NCP began the negotiations to form a new coalition government. Katainen said that the result of the election supports a coalition based on the three largest parties, i.e. the National Coalition Party, the Social Democratic Party and the True Finns. The most problematic question was believed to be the EU bailout policy, where the True Finns most differ from the other parties.

Formal negotiations were scheduled to start after Easter on 24 April. The National Coalition Party's Alexander Stubb said that a government could be formed by 9 May, though he admitted that it was an optimistic timetable. This was despite EU worries about what effect a new government could have on the bailout. The Kiviniemi government submitted its resignation on 29 April, though it would continue to serve as a caretaker government until a new one was formed.

If the True Finns could not agree to a common platform to provide suitable ministers from the party's elected representatives list, Soini hinted to Yle the possibility of choosing ministers from what he ambiguously called his party's "background groups". Although the True Finns said they were ready to enter the negotiations on the formation of a new government, conflicting reports emerged of the True Finns saying that they cannot "in good conscience" support the Portuguese rescue package or the creation of a permanent bailout fund by the EU and that they had toned down criticism of the package saying it may be in the interests of Finland. However, the SDP also wanted the rules for the international financial system to be reformed. The NCP's Alexander Stubb said that "It will be very difficult to keep a party with 39 seats out of government. If we can find compromises, we can have the True Finns in government." Amidst ongoing talks Soini backtracked on previous inferences that he would be willing to set aside the issue of the Portugal bailout saying "We can't vote for this (bailout of Portugal) and we won't...If Finland can find a majority that can push this through and a government is formed after that, then that will be a different situation." Bloomberg suggested that the True Finns were still taking the government formation talks "seriously" and hoped to be a part of the next government once differences over the Portuguese bailout had been set aside. This was despite Katainen's pledge not to form a government with parties that opposed the bailout measures.

On 11 May, the NCP and the Social Democrats struck a deal by which the Social Democrats would vote in favour of the Portugal bailout. In return, the NCP would support the Social Democrats' demand for the establishment of a bank tax in both Finland and in other European countries. The Social Democrats also set certain conditions for the Portuguese bailout, for example demanding that Portugal sell state property (these conditions were, however, described as meaningless by True Finns and Left Alliance politicians, who accused the SDP of "selling out"). The following day the True Finns announced that they would withdraw from the government formation negotiations due to the bailout issue. Soini said he would remain true to the True Finns' campaign promises and not compromise on the party's core principles.

After Soini's announcement, Jyrki Katainen invited the SDP, the Greens, the Swedish People's Party and the Christian Democrats for negotiations to form a coalition led by his National Coalition Party. The Greens indicated that they would only join the coalition if the other parties agreed to their strict demands: a commitment not to build more nuclear reactors, a new "environmental-friendly" climate law and a 100 euro increase to the smallest welfare benefits.

On 18 May Katainen announced that he would invite the Left Alliance as well to the government formation negotiations, which began on 20 May. The Left Alliance's participation had been demanded by the Social Democrats. The six-party coalition that would comprise the National Coalition Party, Social Democratic Party, the Swedish People's Party, the Christian Democratic Party, the Green League and the Left Alliance would have 126 seats in the parliament.

As six-party talks got underway on 20 May, amid differences on taxation policy between the NCP and SDP. The latter were opposed to the former's plan to raise the turnover tax; the talk also sought to ensure revenue needed to be saved so as continue funding government programmes in the future. The NCP's Katainen said of the talks that "expectations were high", though he did not comment on rumours of six billion euros worth of cuts: "I believe that all necessary means must be used to secure the welfare state. The poor's best friend is strong government finances." The SDP's Urpilainen commented that the negotiations were being conducted in good spirits and that she thought the atmosphere of the talks was good, though she added that taxation would be the biggest stumbling block and that public spending cuts would not be specifically discussed pending the overall look at economic issues. She also added that a caretaker government could present the Portugal bailout package measure before parliament in the following week with a decision possible at the end of the week. She added a decision might even be forthcoming later on Friday; she said the SDP's support would be determined by added investor responsibility. The parliament approved the bailout proposal on 25 May with the True Finns and the Left Alliance dissenting and all the other parties voting in favour of the measure.

On 1 June, the Social Democrats and the Left Alliance quit government formation talks referring to "unsustainable differences" on issues concerning economic growth and employment policies. In response Katainen said that he would continue negotiations with the Greens, the Swedish People's Party and the Christian Democrats and that he would also invite the Centre Party to the negotiations. On 6 June, after consulting its members on a questionnaire, the Centre Party decided to join the government formation talks. However, on the same day the Green League decided to leave the talks referring to the party's election result (which came after four years in a similar centre-right coalition) and doubtful if the proposed coalition could further "green" policies in such a coalition. Amongst those partaking in the talks, a coalition of the NCP, the Centre Party, the SPP and the Christian Democrats would have only 95 MPs – a minority government.

On 7 June, Katainen said that he would still pursue a majority government. All eight parliamentary groups decided to give Katainen time until 10 June to announce a final coalition. On 10 June, Katainen then announced that the same six parties, whose negotiations had broken up earlier in the month (the NCP, the SDP, the SPP, the Christian Democrats, the Green League and the Left Alliance), would return to the negotiation table. He described this as the "only possible coalition". On 14 June, he said that talks were positive and a government would be formed soon.

On 17 June, the six parties came to an agreement on forming a coalition government. Following criticism from incumbent prime minister Kivienmi, Katainen defended his government's platform in parliament and the government survived a motion of no-confidence put forth by the opposition. However, the same two Left Alliance MPs – Markus Mustajärvi and Jyrki Yrttiaho – again broke from the party position and voted against the government – for this they were expelled from the Left Alliance parliamentary group and continue their work as independent MPs. The government, led by Katainen, will have 19 ministers. The ministerial portfolios would be divided with the NCP and the SDP both having six ministers, while the Left Alliance, the Greens and the SPP would each have two ministers and the Christian Democrats would have one. The NCP, SDP, SPP and Christian Democrats announced their candidates for ministerial positions on 18 June, while the Left Alliance, —with some of its notable members opposing joining the government,— confirmed its participation in the government and its nominees for ministerial portfolios on its party council on 19 June. The Green League announced its ministers on 20 June. On 22 June, the parliament elected Katainen as prime minister by a vote of 118–72; two Left Alliance MPs voted against Katainen, for which they were formally reprimanded by the Left Alliance parliamentary group. President Tarja Halonen then formally inaugurated the government at the Government Palace in Helsinki the same afternoon.

Reactions

A TNS Gallup poll commissioned by Helsingin Sanomat found that while two-thirds of True Finns voters feel the party made the right decision to sit in opposition, half of the Green League's voters also felt the same way. Conversely a majority of Social Democratic Party and Centre Party voters felt that the True Finns should have stayed in the government formation talks. Half of the respondents to the poll wanted to see the True Finns to show flexibility over the EU bailout issue to at least for government talks, which was supported by only 16% of TF supporters versus more than two-thirds of voters of the other three major parties. A majority of 52% also felt that a government without the TF could survive the four-year parliamentary tenure.

The True Finns' vice-chairman Vesa-Matti Saarakkala suggested the outcome of the polls show convergence between the True Finns' social policy with those of the SDP and the Centre Party. "With the Greens, the background could be that they don't want us in the government. However, the most important thing is that our own supporters should understand our decision. The Social Democrats decided the game with their own stance on the EU. There is no point in them crying about how the True Finns are not in the government." He also said that the 52% of people thinking the government could survive without the TF is a "surprisingly" low proportion: "It shows that the times are challenging and uncertain. Anything can happen to the euro and to [the] Economic and Monetary Union.

After the formation of a new government, the Centre Party's leader Kiviniemi commented on the government programme saying that the six-party government "agreeing on increasing consumption taxes, decreasing tax-deductibility on mortgage part payments and cuts on services by municipalities, forgot the (sic) families with children."

== Midterm replacements ==
Name	Party	Constituency	Date of resignation	Reason of resignation	Replacement
Jyri Häkämies	National Coalition Party	Kymi	21 November 2012	became CEO of Confederation of Finnish Industries	Anu Urpalainen
Astrid Thors	Swedish People's Party	Helsinki	5 September 2013	became High Commissioner on National Minorities (HCNM) of the Organization for Security and Co-operation in Europe	Jörn Donner .
Henna Virkkunen	National Coalition Party	Central Finland	4 July 2014	was elected to the European Parliament	Mikael Palola .
Jussi Halla-aho	True Finns	Helsinki	4 July 2014	was elected to the European Parliament	Mika Raatikainen .
Miapetra Kumpula-Natri	Social Democratic Party	Vaasa	4 July 2014	was elected to the European Parliament	Harry Wallin .
Merja Kyllönen	Left Alliance	Oulu	4 July 2014	was elected to the European Parliament	Katja Hänninen.
Jyrki Katainen	National Coalition Party	Uusimaa	4 July 2014	became European Commissioner for Industry and Entrepreneurship at the European Commission	Elina Lepomäki .
Mari Kiviniemi	Centre Party	Helsinki	9 September 2014	became the Deputy Secretary-General of the OECD	Terhi Peltokorpi .
Anni Sinnemäki	Green League	Helsinki	14 January 2015	was elected as Deputy Mayor of Helsinki	Johanna Sumuvuori .
