= Eija Nivala =

Finnish politician

Member of the Finnish parliament
- In office 18 June 2018 – 25 June 2018
- Constituency: Oulu

Personal details
- Born: 27 February 1967 (age 59) Joensuu, North Karelia, Finland
- Party: Centre Party
- Education: University of Helsinki

Eija Hannele Nivala (born 27 February 1967) is a Finnish priest and politician, formerly representing the Centre Party in the parliament of Finland.

Nivala ran in the 2015 parliamentary election in the electoral district of Oulu, but her 4,476 votes were not enough to get elected. However, after MP Mirja Vehkaperä left the parliament in June 2018, Nivala took the vacated seat and started her term in the parliament on 18 June 2018. Her term lasted only until 25 June 2018, as Nivala was elected the vicar of the parish of Ylivieska and decided to vacate her seat for Hanna-Leena Mattila.
