= Southeast Finland =

Electoral district of the Parliament of Finland

- Kaakkois-Suomi; Sydöstra Finland
- Electoral District for the Parliament of Finland
- Location of Southeast Finland within Finland
- Municipality: List: Enonkoski; Hamina; Hirvensalmi; Imatra; Juva; Kangasniemi; Kotka; Kouvola; Lappeenranta; Lemi; Luumäki; Mäntyharju; Miehikkälä; Mikkeli; Parikkala; Pertunmaa; Pieksämäki; Puumala; Pyhtää; Rantasalmi; Rautjärvi; Ruokolahti; Savitaipale; Savonlinna; Sulkava; Taipalsaari; Virolahti
- Region: Kymenlaakso; South Karelia; South Savo
- Population: 415,417 (2022)
- Electorate: 353,468 (2023)
- Area: 28,919 km^{2} (2022)

Current Electoral District
- Created: 2015
- Seats: List: 15 (2023–present); 17 (2015–2023)
- Members of Parliament: List: Juho Eerola (PS); Antti Häkkänen (Kok; Hanna Holopainen (Vihr); Vesa Kallio (Kesk); Ville Kaunisto (Kok); Jukka Kopra (Kok); Hanna Kosonen (Kesk); Suna Kymäläinen (SDP); Sheikki Laakso (PS); Jani Mäkelä (PS); Niina Malm (SDP); Anna-Kristiina Mikkonen (SDP); Jaana Strandman (PS); Oskari Valtola (Kok); Paula Werning (SDP)
- Created from: Kymi; South Savo

Southeast Finland (Finnish: Kaakkois-Suomi; Swedish: Sydöstra Finland) is one of the 13 electoral districts of the Parliament of Finland, the national legislature of Finland. The district was established in 2013 by the merger of Kymi and South Savo districts. It is conterminous with the regions of Kymenlaakso, South Karelia and South Savo. The district currently elects 15 of the 200 members of the Parliament of Finland using the open party-list proportional representation electoral system. At the 2023 parliamentary election it had 353,468 registered electors.

== History ==
Southeast Finland was established in 2013 by the merger of Kymi and South Savo districts. In 2021, the municipalities of Heinävesi and Joroinen were transferred from Southeast Finland to Savo-Karelia and Iitti municipality was transferred from Southeast Finland to Häme.

== Electoral system ==
Southeast Finland currently elects 15 of the 200 members of the Parliament of Finland using the open party-list proportional representation electoral system. Parties may form electoral alliances with each other to pool their votes and increase their chances of winning seats. However, the number of candidates nominated by an electoral alliance may not exceed the maximum number of candidates that a single party may nominate. Seats are allocated using the D'Hondt method.

== Election results ==
=== Detailed ===
==== 2023 ====
Results of the 2023 parliamentary election held on 2 April 2023:

Party		Party			Electoral Alliance		
Party		Votes	%	Seats	Votes	%	Seats
Social Democratic Party of Finland	SDP	54,115	23.67%	4	54,115	23.67%	4
Finns Party	PS	52,026	22.76%	4	52,026	22.76%	4
National Coalition Party	Kok	50,218	21.96%	4	50,695	22.17%	4
Swedish People's Party of Finland	SFP	477	0.21%	0	50,695	22.17%	4
Centre Party	Kesk	31,063	13.59%	2	31,063	13.59%	2
Green League	Vihr	11,721	5.13%	1	11,721	5.13%	1
Left Alliance	Vas	8,570	3.75%	0	8,570	3.75%	0
Movement Now	Liik	8,026	3.51%	0	8,026	3.51%	0
Christian Democrats	KD	8,023	3.51%	0	8,023	3.51%	0
Freedom Alliance	VL	1,728	0.76%	0	2,166	0.95%	0
Crystal Party	KRIP	438	0.19%	0	2,166	0.95%	0
Power Belongs to the People	VKK	1,193	0.52%	0	1,193	0.52%	0
Liberal Party – Freedom to Choose	Lib	517	0.23%	0	517	0.23%	0
Communist Party of Finland	SKP	258	0.11%	0	258	0.11%	0
Finnish Reform Movement	KL	255	0.11%	0	255	0.11%	0
Valid Votes		228,628	100.00%	15	228,628	100.00%	15
Rejected Votes		998	0.43%				
Total Polled		229,626	64.96%				
Registered Electors		353,468					

The following candidates were elected: Juho Eerola (PS), 8,849 votes; Antti Häkkänen (Kok), 21,378 votes; Hanna Holopainen (Vihr), 2,762 votes; Vesa Kallio (Kesk), 5,663 votes; Ville Kaunisto (Kok), 7,224 votes; Jukka Kopra (Kok), 5,731 votes; Hanna Kosonen (Kesk), 5,147 votes; Suna Kymäläinen (SDP), 5,810 votes; Sheikki Laakso (PS), 7,635 votes; Jani Mäkelä (PS), 5,160 votes; Niina Malm (SDP), 8,180 votes; Anna-Kristiina Mikkonen (SDP), 5,483 votes; Jaana Strandman (PS), 5,179 votes; Oskari Valtola (Kok), 4,335 votes; and Paula Werning (SDP), 5,046 votes.

==== 2019 ====
Results of the 2019 parliamentary election held on 14 April 2019:

Party		Party			Electoral Alliance		
Party		Votes	%	Seats	Votes	%	Seats
Social Democratic Party of Finland	SDP	59,722	24.38%	5	59,722	24.38%	5
Finns Party	PS	46,196	18.86%	4	46,196	18.86%	4
National Coalition Party	Kok	44,224	18.05%	3	44,224	18.05%	3
Centre Party	Kesk	40,715	16.62%	3	40,715	16.62%	3
Green League	Vihr	23,032	9.40%	2	23,032	9.40%	2
Christian Democrats	KD	10,875	4.44%	0	10,875	4.44%	0
Left Alliance	Vas	10,371	4.23%	0	10,371	4.23%	0
Movement Now	Liik	4,030	1.65%	0	4,030	1.65%	0
Blue Reform	SIN	3,212	1.31%	0	3,212	1.31%	0
Seven Star Movement	TL	829	0.34%	0	829	0.34%	0
Pirate Party	Pir	687	0.28%	0	687	0.28%	0
Citizens' Party	KP	473	0.19%	0	628	0.26%	0
Finnish People First	SKE	155	0.06%	0	628	0.26%	0
Feminist Party	FP	201	0.08%	0	201	0.08%	0
Communist Party of Finland	SKP	121	0.05%	0	121	0.05%	0
Communist Workers' Party – For Peace and Socialism	KTP	83	0.03%	0	83	0.03%	0
Independence Party	IPU	48	0.02%	0	48	0.02%	0
Valid Votes		244,974	100.00%	17	244,974	100.00%	17
Rejected Votes		1,555	0.63%				
Total Polled		246,529	65.43%				
Registered Electors		376,784					

The following candidates were elected: Juho Eerola (PS), 10,441 votes; Antti Häkkänen (Kok), 20,234 votes; Hanna Holopainen (Vihr), 2,659 votes; Heli Järvinen (Vihr), 3,275 votes; Ville Kaunisto (Kok), 3,717 votes; Anneli Kiljunen (SDP), 6,419 votes; Jukka Kopra (Kok), 4,025 votes; Hanna Kosonen (Kesk), 5,583 votes; Suna Kymäläinen (SDP), 6,076 votes; Sheikki Laakso (PS), 5,647 votes; Jari Leppä (Kesk), 7,458 votes; Jani Mäkelä (PS), 7,147 votes; Niina Malm (SDP), 5,815 votes; Sirpa Paatero (SDP), 7,864 votes; Ari Torniainen (Kesk), 4,441 votes; Ano Turtiainen (PS), 3,264 votes; and Paula Werning (SDP), 6,074 votes.

==== 2015 ====
Results of the 2015 parliamentary election held on 19 April 2015:

Party		Votes	%	Seats
Centre Party	Kesk	61,794	25.17%	5
Social Democratic Party of Finland	SDP	54,604	22.24%	4
True Finns	PS	51,707	21.06%	4
National Coalition Party	Kok	38,947	15.86%	3
Green League	Vihr	15,664	6.38%	1
Christian Democrats	KD	11,056	4.50%	0
Left Alliance	Vas	7,336	2.99%	0
Independence Party	IPU	1,806	0.74%	0
Pirate Party	Pir	1,085	0.44%	0
Swedish People's Party of Finland	SFP	728	0.30%	0
Communist Party of Finland	SKP	286	0.12%	0
Change 2011		199	0.08%	0
Association of Voters		174	0.07%	0
Communist Workers' Party – For Peace and Socialism	KTP	106	0.04%	0
Workers' Party of Finland	STP	53	0.02%	0
Valid Votes		245,545	100.00%	17
Rejected Votes		1,350	0.55%	
Total Polled		246,895	63.73%	
Registered Electors		387,403		

The following candidates were elected: Juho Eerola (PS), 8,320 votes; Antti Häkkänen (Kok), 6,216 votes; Heli Järvinen (Vihr), 3,580 votes; Anneli Kiljunen (SDP), 5,418 votes; Jukka Kopra (Kok), 4,677 votes; Hanna Kosonen (Kesk), 6,600 votes; Suna Kymäläinen (SDP), 7,435 votes; Jari Leppä (Kesk), 9,362 votes; Jari Lindström (PS), 9,966 votes; Jani Mäkelä (PS), 6,102 votes; Sirpa Paatero (SDP), 9,764 votes; Markku Pakkanen (Kesk), 6,265 votes; Satu Taavitsainen (SDP), 5,416 votes; Kimmo Tiilikainen (Kesk), 9,193 votes; Lenita Toivakka (Kok), 5,028 votes; Ari Torniainen (Kesk), 5,412 votes; and Kaj Turunen (PS), 6,929 votes.
