= Hanna Kosonen =

Finnish politician and ski orienteer

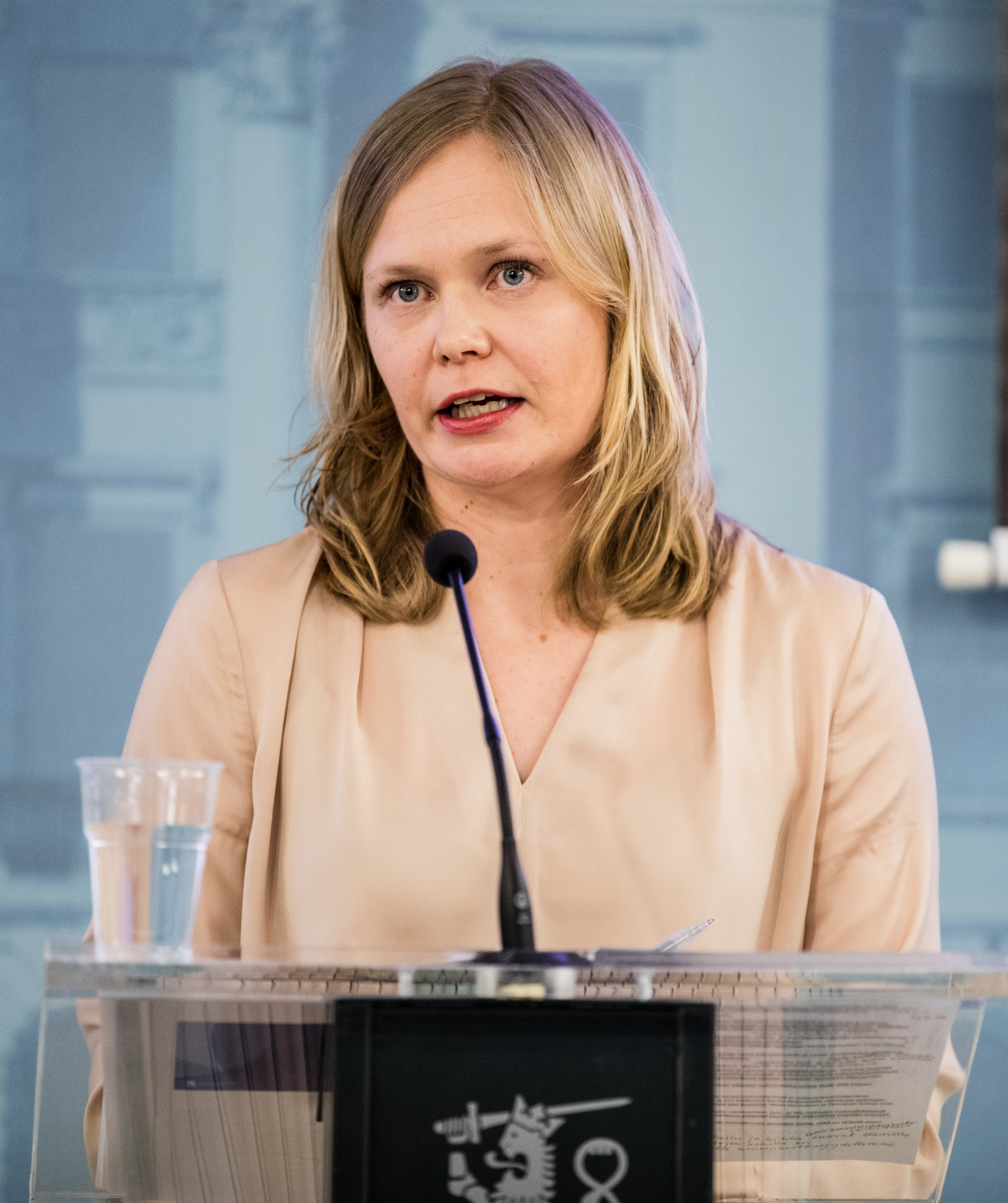
- Kosonen in 2020

Minister of Science and Culture
- In office 9 August 2019 – 5 August 2020
- Prime Minister: Antti Rinne; Sanna Marin
- Preceded by: Annika Saarikko
- Succeeded by: Annika Saarikko

Member of the Finnish Parliament for South-Eastern Finland
- Incumbent
- Assumed office 22 April 2015

Personal details
- Born: 27 February 1976 (age 50) Savonlinna, Finland
- Party: Centre
- Education: University of Jyväskylä

Hanna Kosonen
Medal record

Representing Finland

Women's ski orienteering

World Championships
Gold medal – first place	2000 Krasnoyarsk	Relay
Bronze medal – third place	2000 Krasnoyarsk	Long

Junior World Championships
Gold medal – first place	1996 Banská Bystrica/Donovaly	Long
Gold medal – first place	1996 Banská Bystrica/Donovaly	Short
Bronze medal – third place	1996 Banská Bystrica/Donovaly	Relay

Hanna Kosonen (born 27 February 1976) is a Finnish politician and former ski-orienteering competitor. She was Finland's Minister of Science and Culture from August 2019 till August 2020.

She became double junior world champion in ski orienteering in 1996. She won a bronze medal in the long distance at the 2000 World Ski Orienteering Championships, and a gold medal in the relay. Her best performances in the World Cup in Ski Orienteering were placing fourth overall in 2000, and fifth overall in 2001.

She has been a member of the Finnish Parliament for the Centre Party since 2015, and was appointed Minister of Science and Culture in Antti Rinne's cabinet in August 2019 for the duration of Annika Saarikko's maternity leave.

== Personal life and professional career ==
Kosonen was born in Savonlinna on 27 February 1976. She graduated with a Master of Arts degree from the University of Jyväskylä in 2003. Her work experience include assignments with the forest industry group Metsäliitto, the association Toiminnanjohtaja, the publishing house Maahenki, and the entrepreneuring association Diges. She has two children; her marriage was dissolved in 2017.

== Sports career ==
=== Junior years ===
Kosonen competed at the 1996 Junior World Ski Orienteering Championships in Banská Bystrica/Donovaly, where she won a gold medal in the long distance, ahead of Anne Margrethe Hausken, a gold medal in the short distance, and a bronze medal in the relay with the Finnish team.

=== Senior years ===
In 1997 she placed 17th overall in the World Cup in Ski Orienteering. She competed at the 1998 World Ski Orienteering Championships in Windischgarsten, where she placed 15th in the long distance, and 13th in the short distance. She placed 8th overall in the World Cup in Ski Orienteering in 1999.

At the 2000 World Ski Orienteering Championships in Krasnoyarsk, she won a bronze medal in the long distance, placed 14th in the short distance, and won a gold medal in the relay with the Finnish team, along with Mervi Anttila and Liisa Anttila. She placed fourth overall in the World Cup in Ski Orienteering in 2000.

In 2001 she placed fifth overall in the World Cup in Ski Orienteering. At the 2002 World Ski Orienteering Championships in Borovetz, she placed 9th in the middle distance and 18th in the long distance.

== Political career ==
Kosonen was elected to the Finnish Parliament for the Centre Party in 2015, from the constituency of South-Eastern Finland. She was member of the Education and Culture Committee. In 2017 she was also elected member of the Savonlinna City Council. In 2019 she was re-elected to the parliament for the term 2019–2023. On 9 August 2019, Kosonen was appointed as Minister of Science and Culture in Antti Rinne's cabinet, replacing Annika Saarikko, who took maternity leave. Saarikko reassumed her post in August 2020.
