= Paula Werning =

Finnish politician

Member of the Finnish Parliament for South-Eastern Finland

Personal details
- Born: 25 April 1976 (age 49) Mikkeli, Southern Savonia, Finland
- Party: Social Democratic Party of Finland

Hanna Paula Helena Werning (born 25 April 1976) is a Finnish politician currently serving in the Parliament of Finland for the Social Democratic Party of Finland at the South-Eastern Finland constituency.
