= Electoral districts of Finland =

There are 13 electoral districts for elections to the Finnish Parliament. Each electoral district elects a number of MPs proportional to its population, currently ranging from 6 to 35 MPs, except Åland which only elects one.

== Boundaries ==
The boundaries of the electoral districts are based on the provinces in use from 1634 to 1997, and have remained largely the same since the first parliamentary election in 1907. Some minor border changes between the regions of Finland have affected the electoral districts, but there have also been larger changes, detailed below.

In 1939, the electoral district of Oulu Province North was divided between the electoral districts of Lapland Province and Oulu Province, and the electoral district of Oulu Province South was renamed to Oulu Province. After the Continuation War, the electoral districts of Eastern and Western Viipuri, which lost much of their territories to the Soviet Union, were united into the new electoral district of Kymi. At the same time, Åland became a distinct electoral district. In 1954, Helsinki City was cut from the electoral district of Uusimaa Province. In 1962, the southern and northern Vaasa electoral districts were united. In 2015, the electoral districts of Kymi and South Savo were united, forming the electoral district of Southeast Finland; similarly, the electoral districts of North Savo and North Karelia were united to form the electoral district of Savo-Karelia.

== Electoral districts ==
The number of seats per electoral district are based on the 2015 parliamentary election.

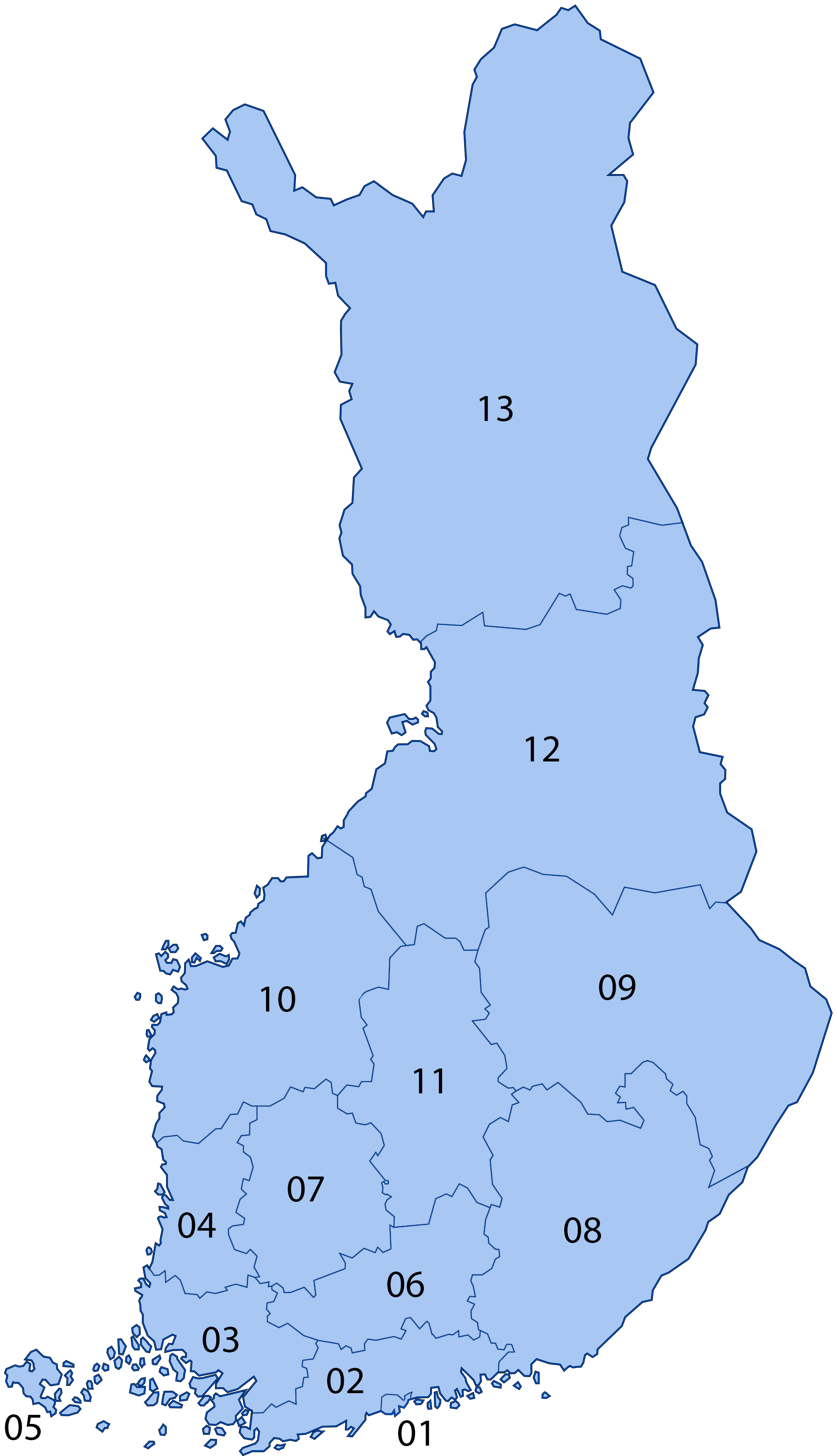
Map of Finland's electoral districts

| # | Electoral district | Seats | Population |
|---|---|---|---|
| 1 | Helsinki | 23 | 635,433 |
| 2 | Uusimaa | 37 | 1,002,137 |
| 3 | Varsinais-Suomi | 17 | 475,559 |
| 4 | Satakunta | 8 | 221,752 |
| 5 | Åland | 1 | 29,179 |
| 6 | Häme | 14 | 375,540 |
| 7 | Pirkanmaa | 20 | 509,309 |
| 8 | Southeast Finland | 15 | 457,336 |
| 9 | Savo-Karelia | 15 | 412,131 |
| 10 | Vaasa | 16 | 442,495 |
| 11 | Central Finland | 10 | 276,265 |
| 12 | Oulu | 18 | 485,980 |
| 13 | Lapland | 6 | 180,231 |
| Total | | 200 | 5,503,347 |

== See also ==
- Municipalities of Finland
