= Sheikki Laakso =

Finnish politician

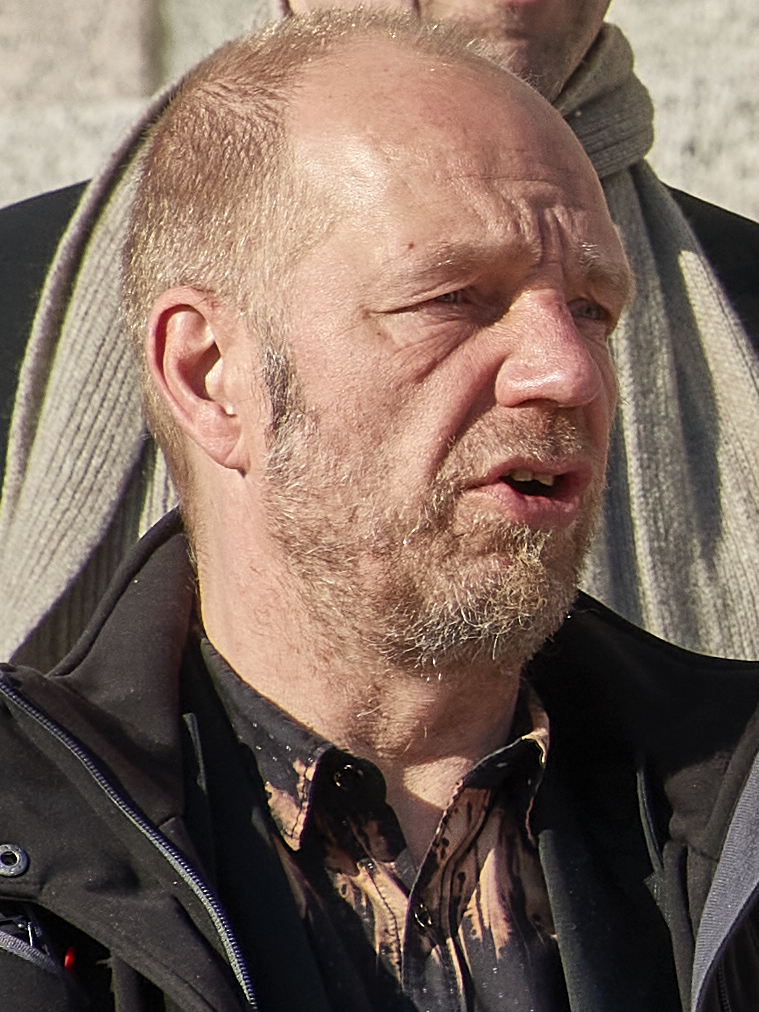
- Laakso in 2021

Member of the Finnish Parliament for South-Eastern Finland

Personal details
- Party: Finns Party

Kristian Sheikki Laakso (né Kristian Veli Laakso; 23 September 1968 in Helsinki) is a Finnish politician currently serving in the Parliament of Finland for the Finns Party at the South-Eastern Finland constituency. He is a member of the Transport and Communications Committee as well as the Environment Committee. Laakso's Parliamentary Assistant is Joona Ikonen.
