= Terhi Peltokorpi =

Finnish politician

Member of the Parliament of Finland
- In office 21 July 2004 – 20 March 2007
- In office 3 September 2014 – 21 April 2015

Personal details
- Born: 25 June 1975 (age 51) Jämsä, Finland
- Party: Centre Party
- Spouse: Risto Peltokorpi

Terhi Päivikki Peltokorpi (born 25 June 1975 in Jämsä, Finland) is a Finnish politician and a member of the City Council of Helsinki. She was a member of the Finnish Parliament 2004–2007, taking Anneli Jäätteenmäki's seat after she left for the European Parliament. Peltokorpi lost her seat in the 2011 election, but rose back to the parliament again in 2014, when Mari Kiviniemi became the OECD Deputy Secretary-General. In 2015 election, Peltokorpi got 1,842 votes, which was not enough for a seat in the parliament.

Peltokorpi is midwife by profession. She is married to Risto Peltokorpi, with whom she has nine children.
