= Hanna Holopainen =

Finnish politician

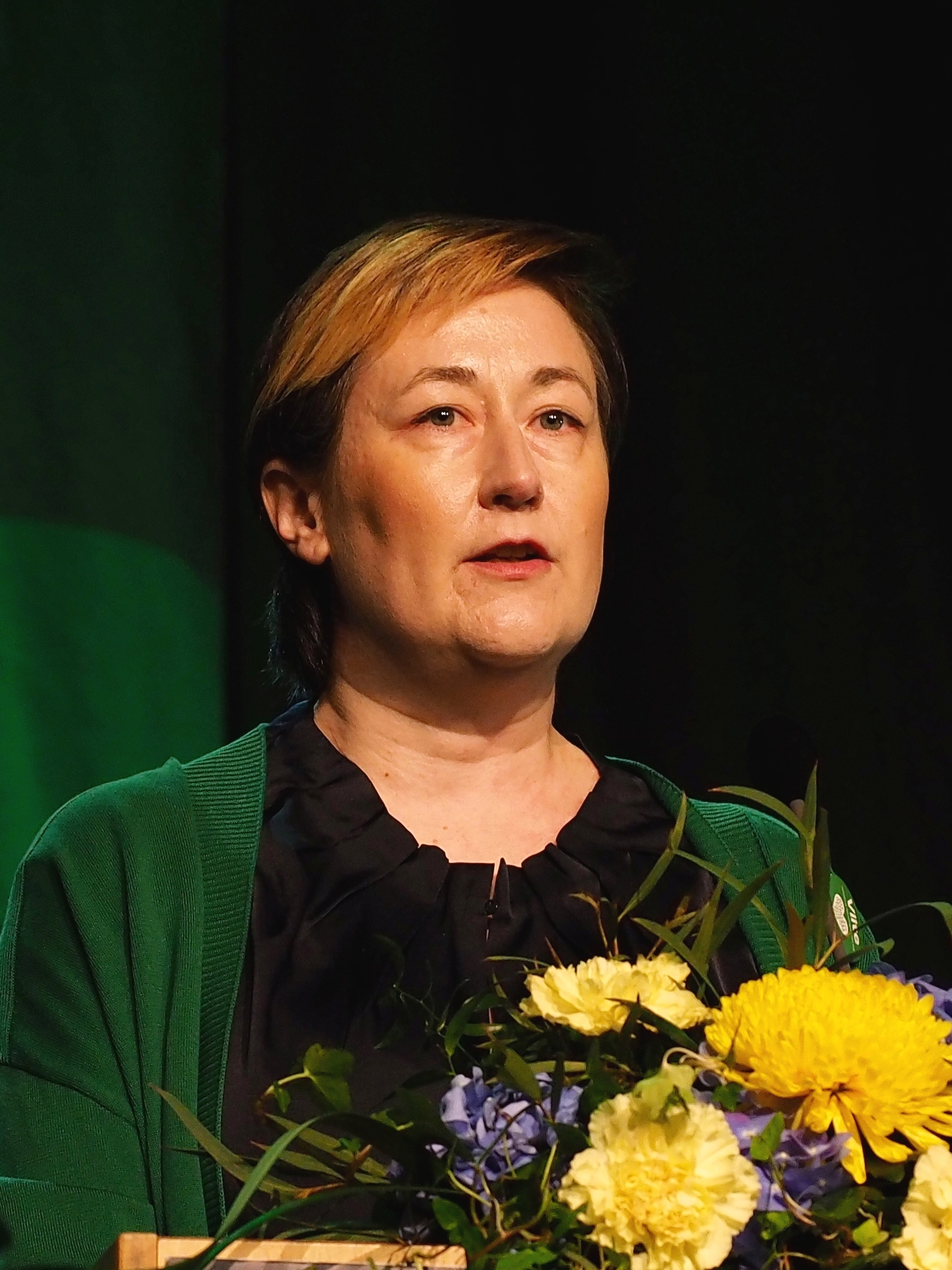
- Holopainen at the 2023 Green League Congress

Member of the Finnish Parliament for Southeast Finland
- Incumbent
- Assumed office 17 April 2019

Personal details
- Born: 8 October 1976 (age 49) Lappeenranta, South Karelia, Finland
- Party: Green League
- Education: Lappeenranta University of Technology

Hanna Riikka Holopainen (born 8 October 1976 in Lappeenranta) is a Finnish Green League politician currently serving in the Parliament of Finland for the electoral district of Southeast Finland.
