= Niina Malm =

Finnish politician

Member of the Finnish Parliament for South-Eastern Finland

Personal details
- Born: May 3, 1982 (age 43) Imatra, South Karelia, Finland
- Party: Social Democratic Party of Finland

Niina Maria Onerva Malm (born 3 May 1982, in Imatra) is a Finnish politician currently serving in the Parliament of Finland for the Social Democratic Party of Finland at the South-Eastern Finland constituency.
