= 2015 Finnish parliamentary election =

- 19 April 2015

All 200 seats in Parliament 101 seats needed for a majority
- Registered: 4,463,333
- Turnout: 70.1% (▼0.4pp)
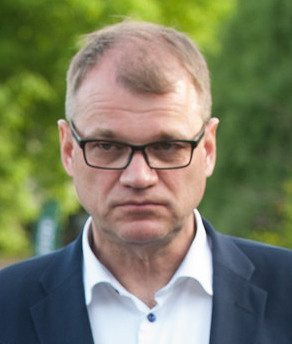

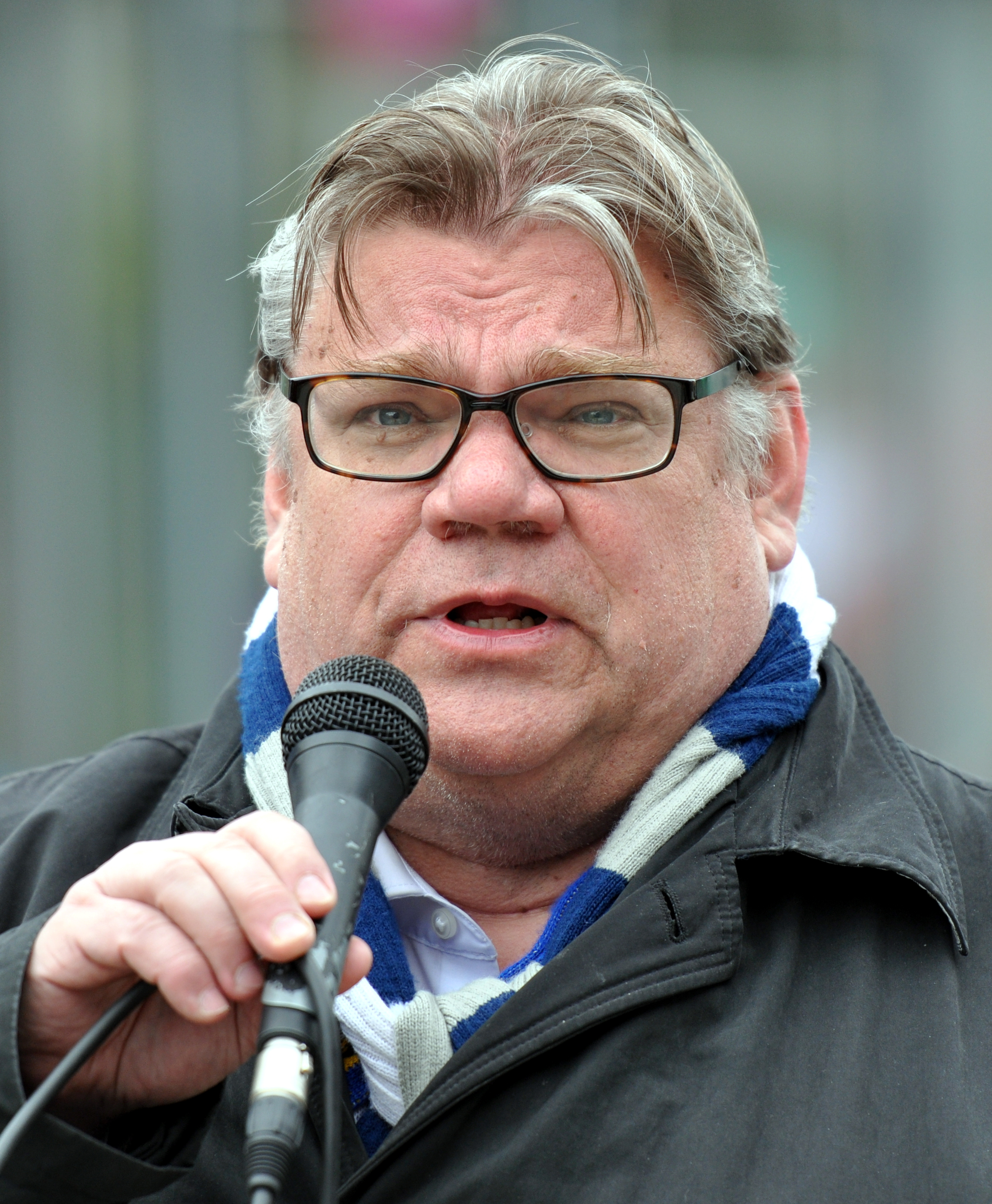

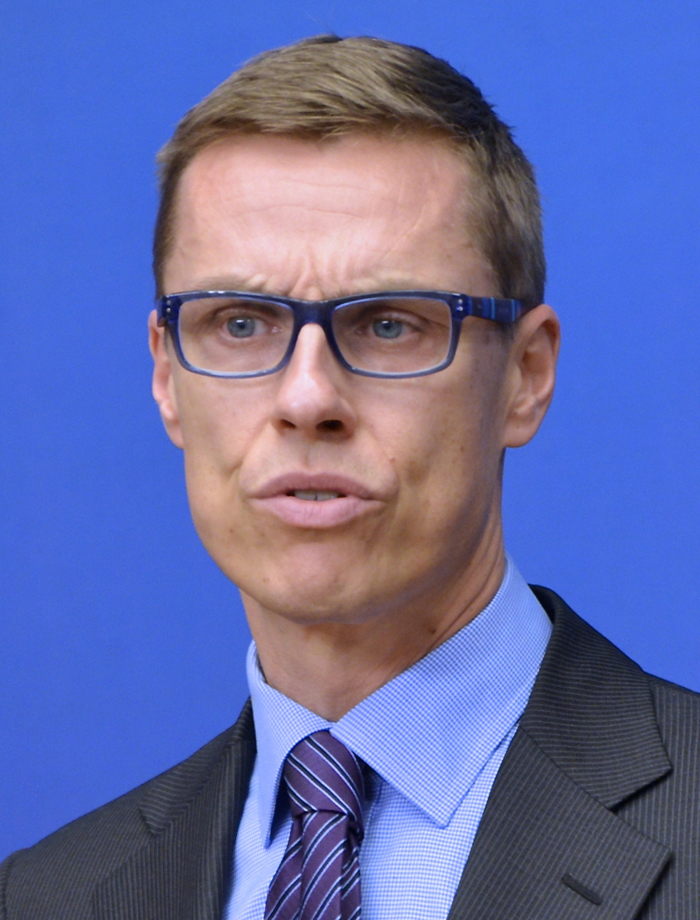

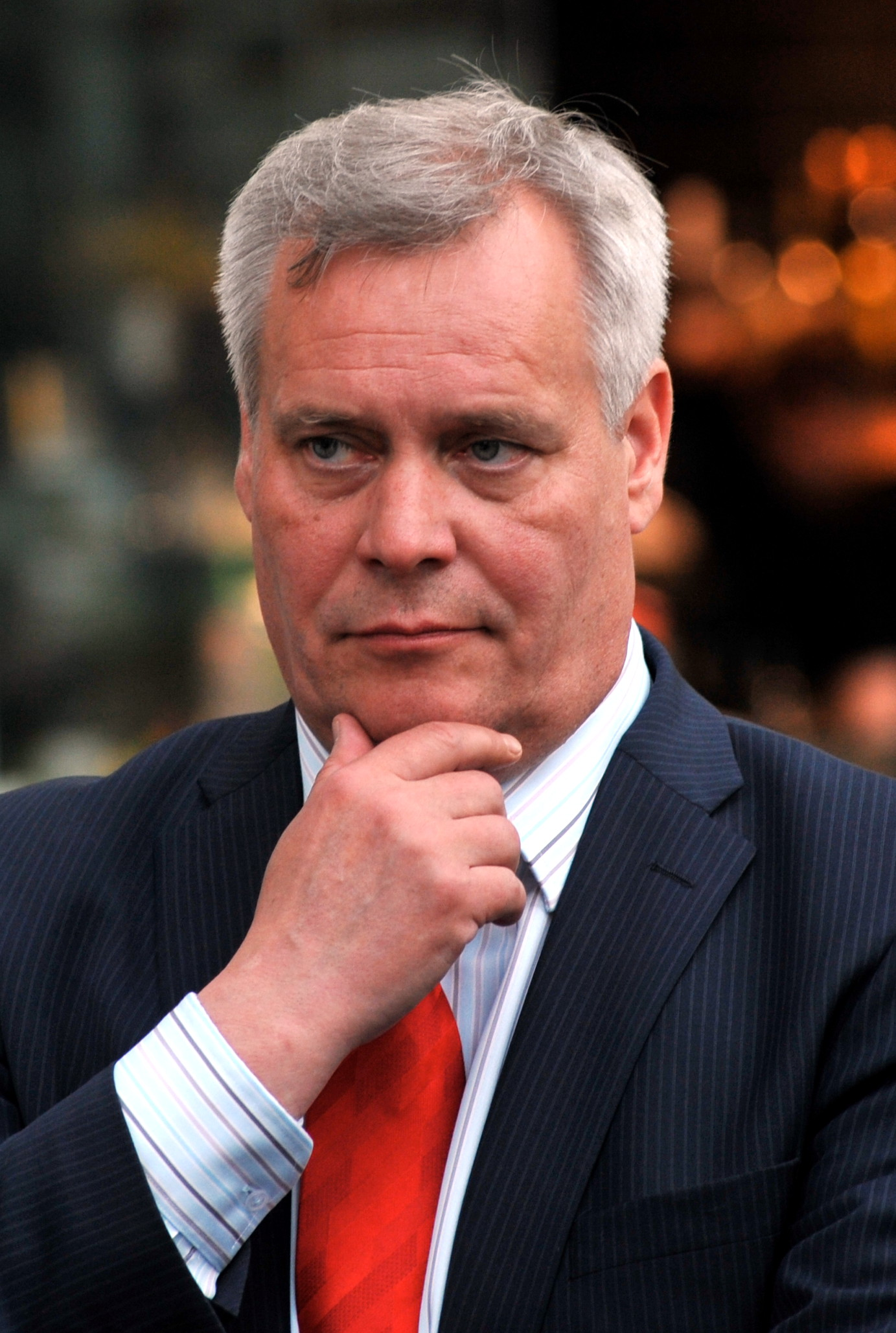

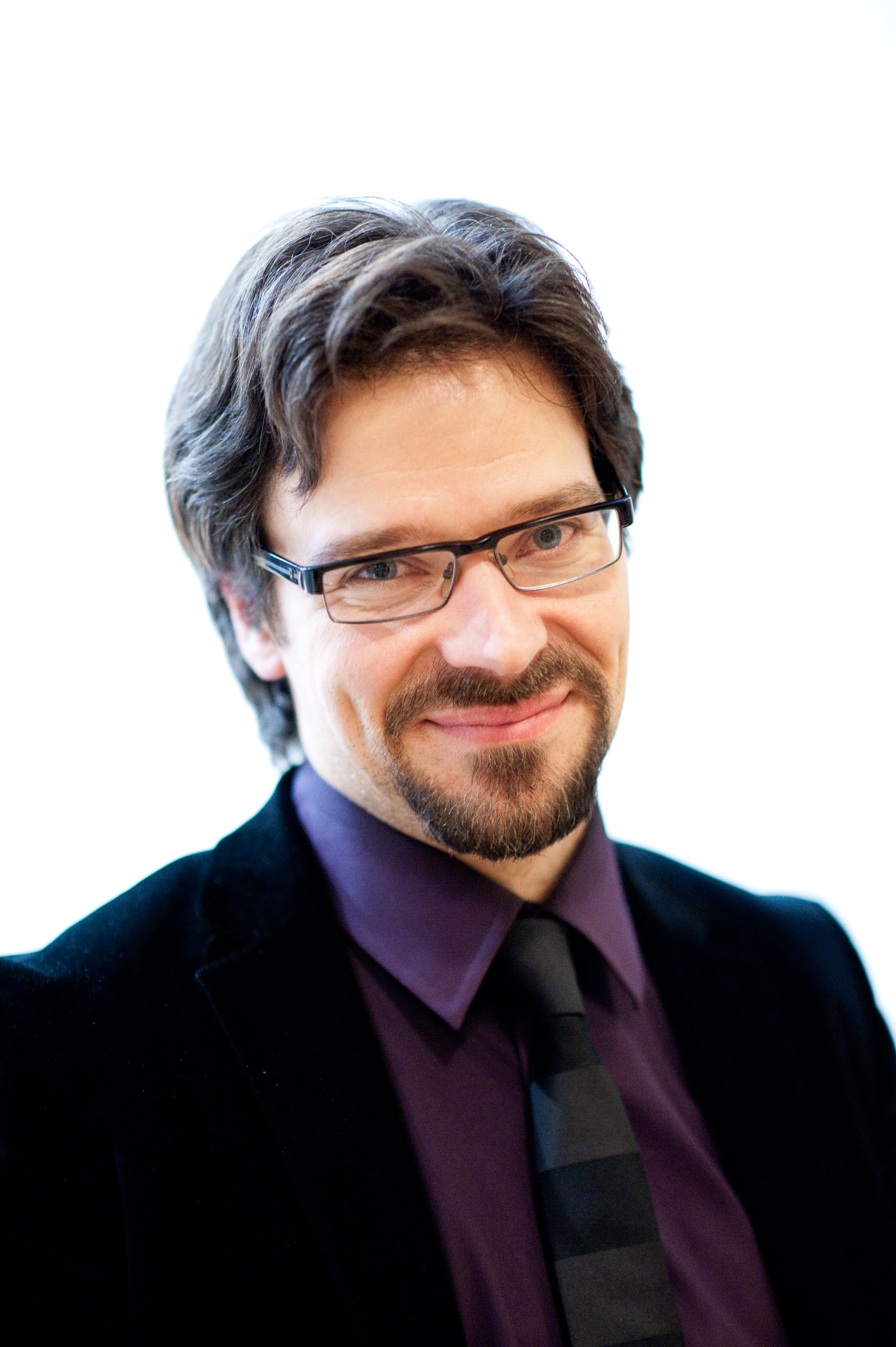

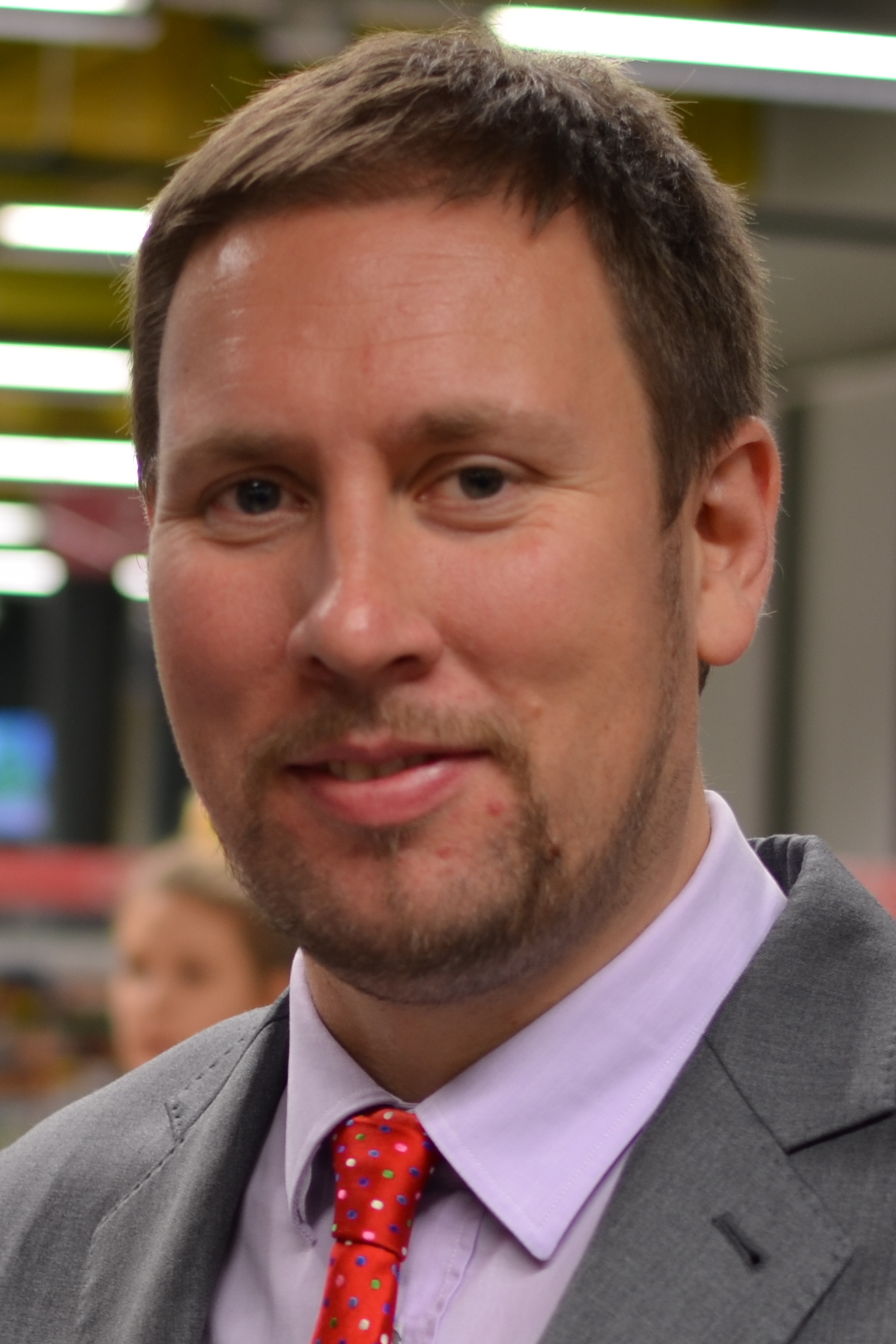

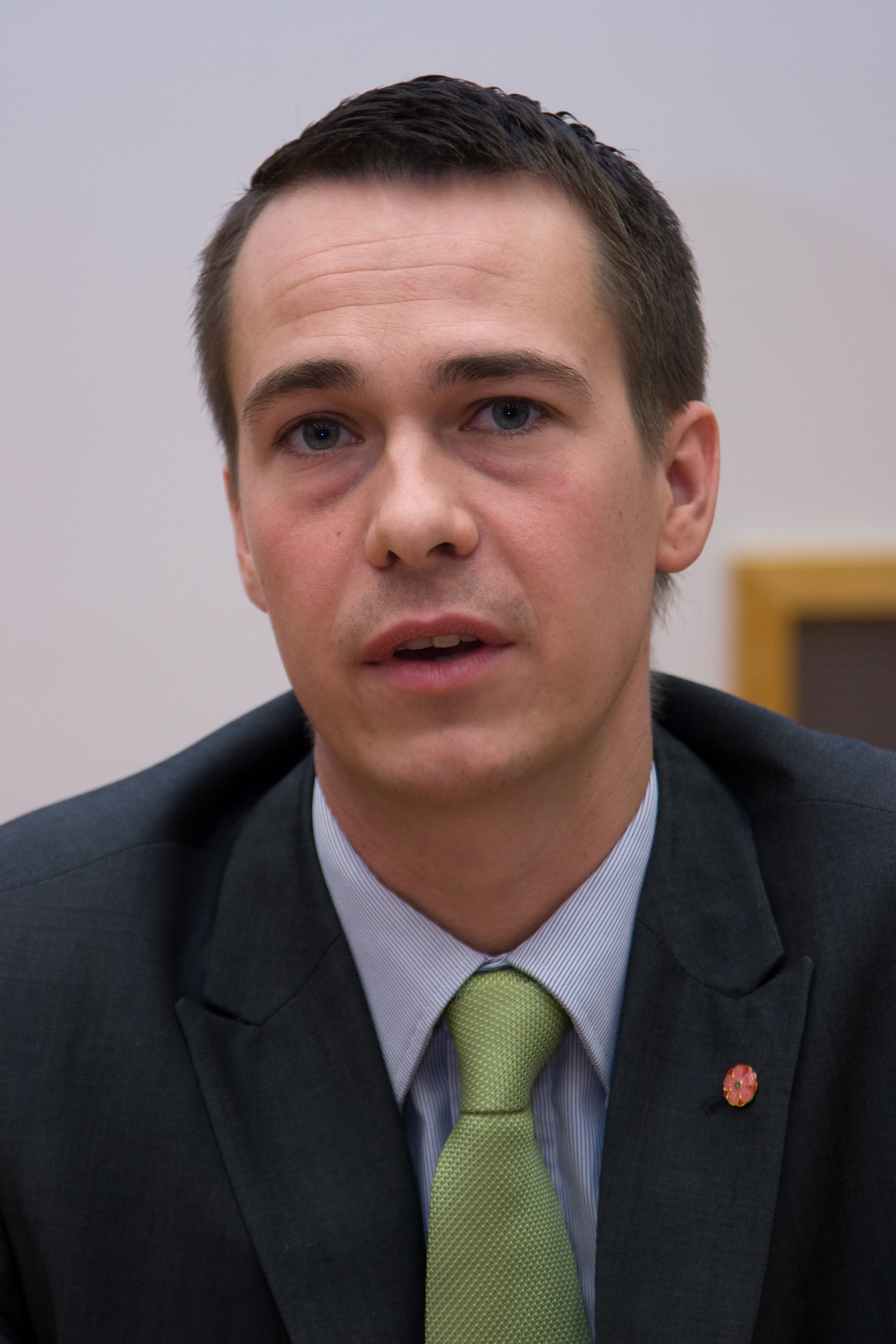

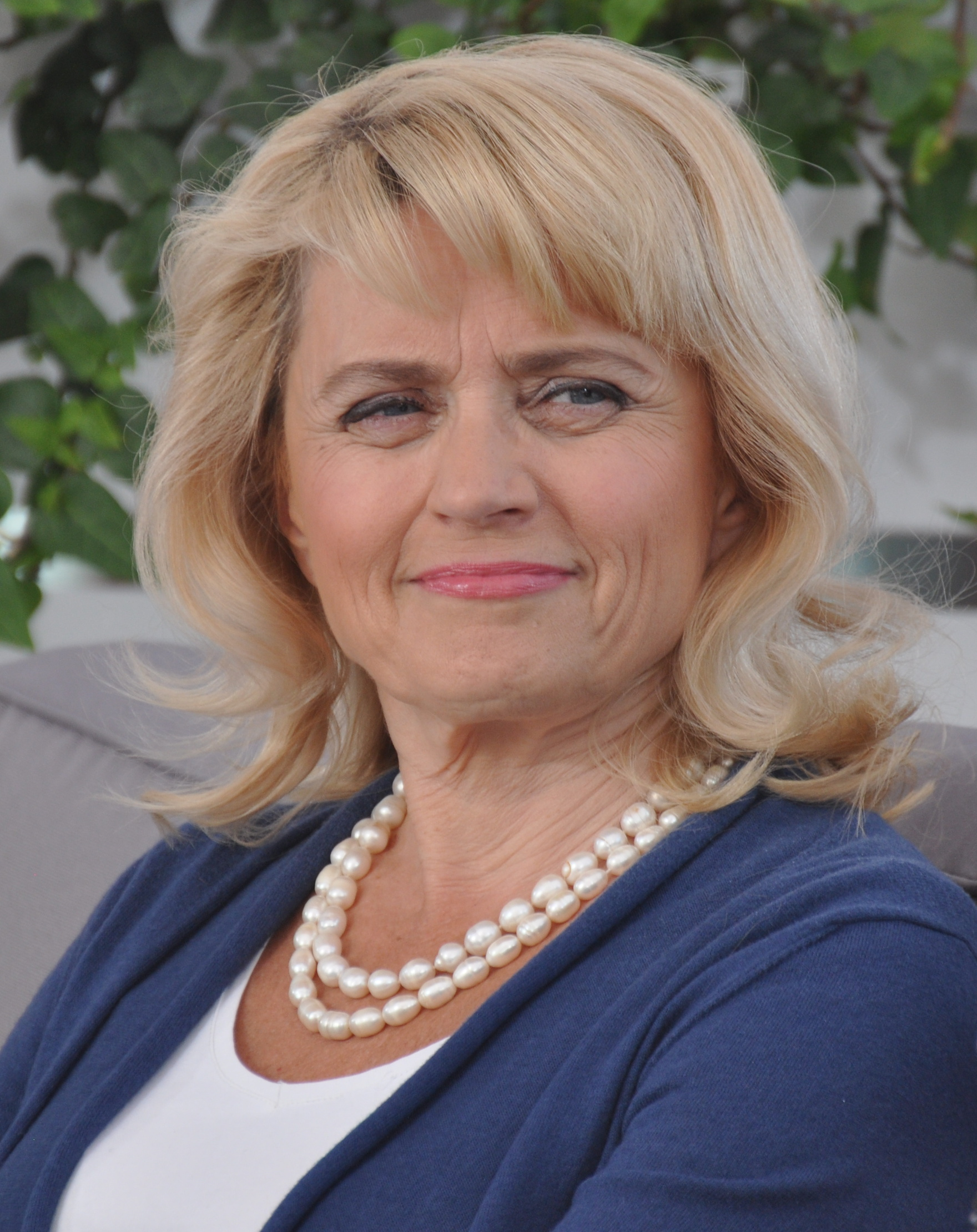

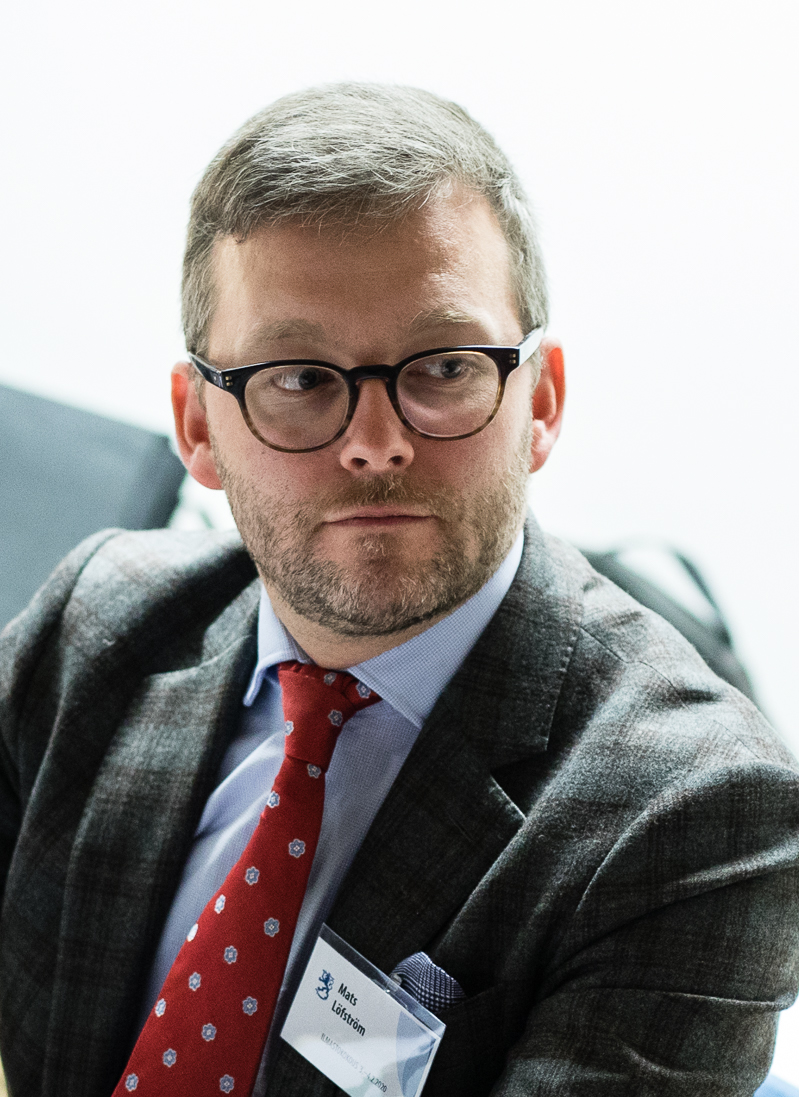
	First party	Second party	Third party
Leader	Juha Sipilä	Timo Soini	Alexander Stubb
Party	Centre	Finns	National Coalition
Last election	35 seats, 15.8%	39 seats, 19.1%	44 seats, 20.4%
Seats won	49	38	37
Seat change	▲14	▼1	▼7
Popular vote	626,218	524,054	540,212
Percentage	21.1%	17.7%	18.2%
Swing	▲5.3pp	▼1.4pp	▼2.2pp
	Fourth party	Fifth party	Sixth party
Leader	Antti Rinne	Ville Niinistö	Paavo Arhinmäki
Party	SDP	Green	Left Alliance
Last election	42 seats, 19.1%	10 seats, 7.3%	14 seats, 8.1%
Seats won	34	15	12
Seat change	▼8	▲5	▼2
Popular vote	490,102	253,102	211,702
Percentage	16.5%	8.5%	7.1%
Swing	▼2.6pp	▲1.3pp	▼1.0pp
	Seventh party	Eighth party	Ninth party
Leader	Carl Haglund	Päivi Räsänen	Mats Löfström
Party	RKP	KD	ÅS
Last election	9 seats, 4.3%	6 seats, 4.0%	1 seat, 0.3%
Seats won	9	5	1
Seat change	Steady	▼1	Steady
Popular vote	144,802	105,134	10,910
Percentage	4.9%	3.5%	0.4%
Swing	▲0.6pp	▼0.5pp	0.0pp
- Results map
Prime Minister before election
Alexander Stubb
National Coalition
Prime Minister after election
Juha Sipilä
Centre

Parliamentary elections were held in Finland on 19 April 2015, with advance voting taking place from 8 to 14 April. The 200 members of the Parliament of Finland were elected with the proportional D'Hondt method.

There were 4,463,333 people entitled to vote in Finland and abroad.

== Background ==
=== Previous government coalition ===
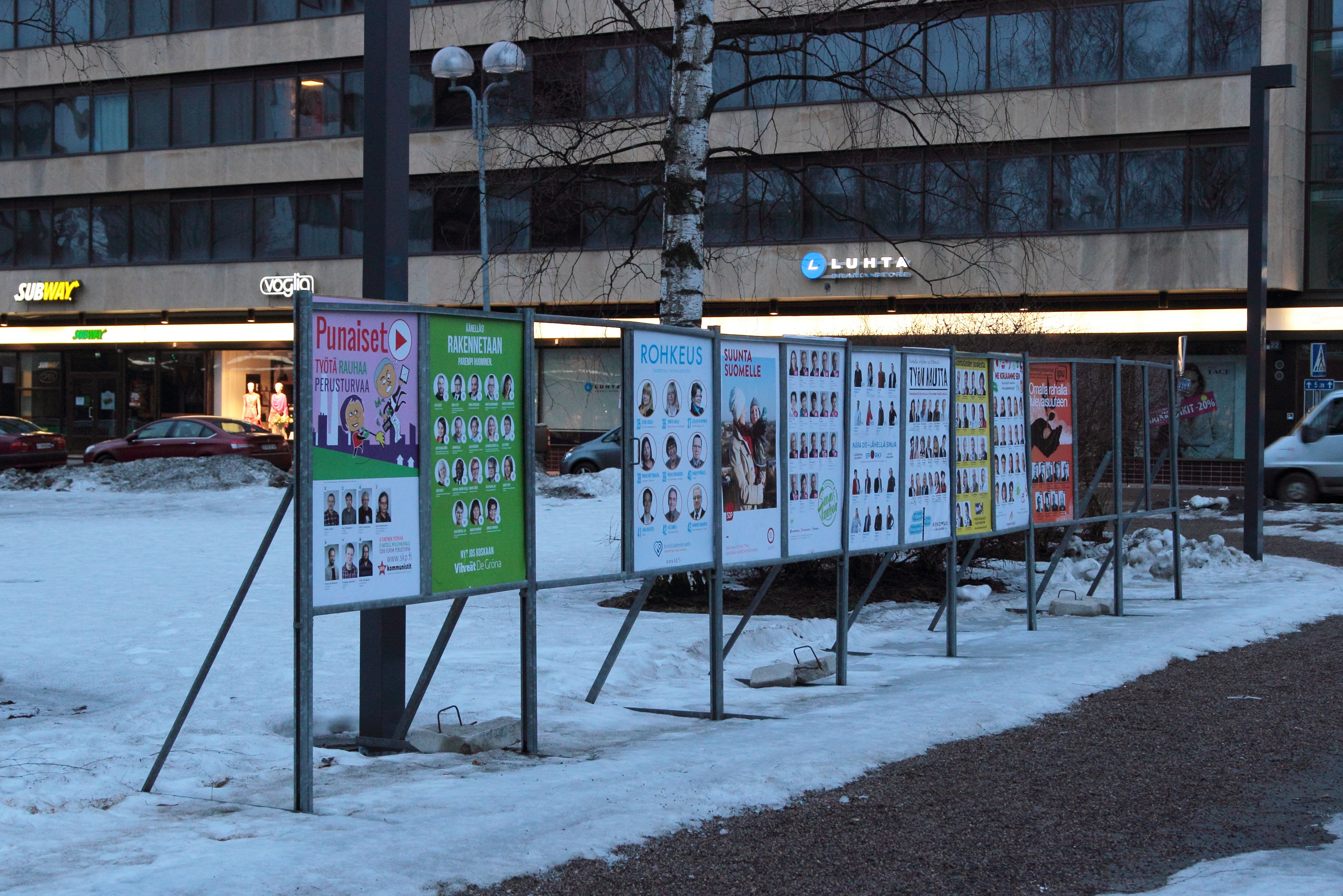
2015 candidate posters

The incumbent government was a four-party coalition composed of the National Coalition Party, Social Democratic Party, Swedish People's Party and the Christian Democrats as well as independent Member of Parliament Elisabeth Nauclér. The Left Alliance and the Green League were initially also part of the governing coalition, but both left in 2014.

On 22 June 2011, the parliament elected Jyrki Katainen as prime minister by a vote of 118–72; two Left Alliance MPs voted against Katainen, for which they were formally reprimanded by the Left Alliance parliamentary group. They were subsequently expelled from the group, reducing the government majority from 126 MPs to 124. In March 2014 the Left Alliance announced that it was leaving the cabinet, citing the party's opposition to budget cuts in social welfare programs, which had been agreed to by the other five parties. This reduced the government's majority to 112 MPs.

In April 2014 Jyrki Katainen announced that he would not seek another term as the chairman of the National Coalition Party. The NCP chose Alexander Stubb as its new chairman in June, and he subsequently became the new prime minister. In September 2014 the Green League announced that it was leaving the cabinet. The Greens were opposed to the other governing parties' decision to grant Fennovoima a licence for building a nuclear power plant in Pyhäjoki. The Greens' departure cut the government's majority to 102 MPs (including the Speaker of the Parliament, who does not vote).

=== Electoral district changes ===
Electoral districts in the 2015 election

In 2013 the parliament decided to merge certain electoral districts to create larger districts: the electoral districts of North Savo and North Karelia were merged into a new district called Savo-Karelia, while the electoral districts of Kymi and South Savo were merged into a new district called Southeast Finland.

Electoral district	Seats
01 Helsinki	22
02 Uusimaa	35
03 Finland Proper	17
04 Satakunta	8
05 Åland	1
06 Häme	14
07 Pirkanmaa	19
08 Southeast Finland	17
09 Savo-Karelia	16
10 Vaasa	16
11 Central Finland	10
12 Oulu	18
13 Lapland	7

== Opinion polls ==
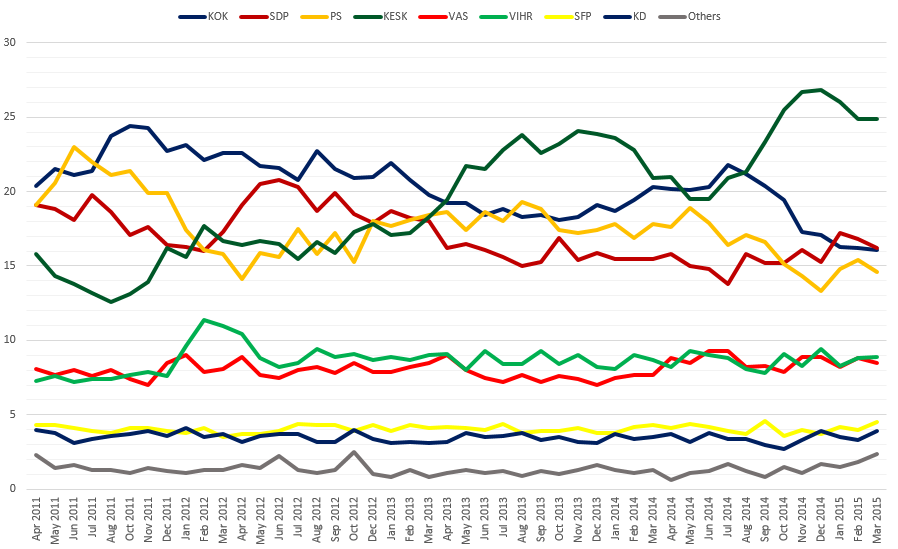
Taloustutkimus opinion polling since 2011 election.

== Results ==
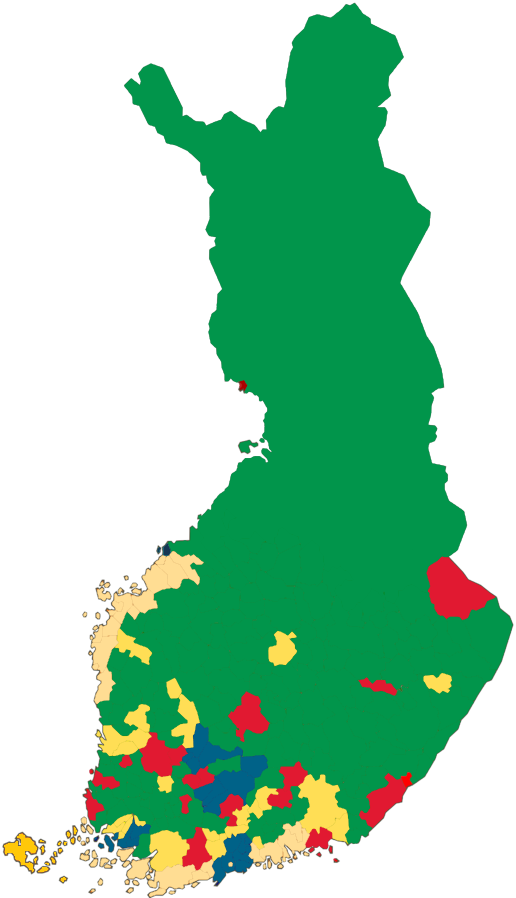
Largest party by municipality: Centre Party Finns Party National Coalition Party Social Democratic Party Left Alliance Swedish People's Party Åland Coalition Christian Democrats

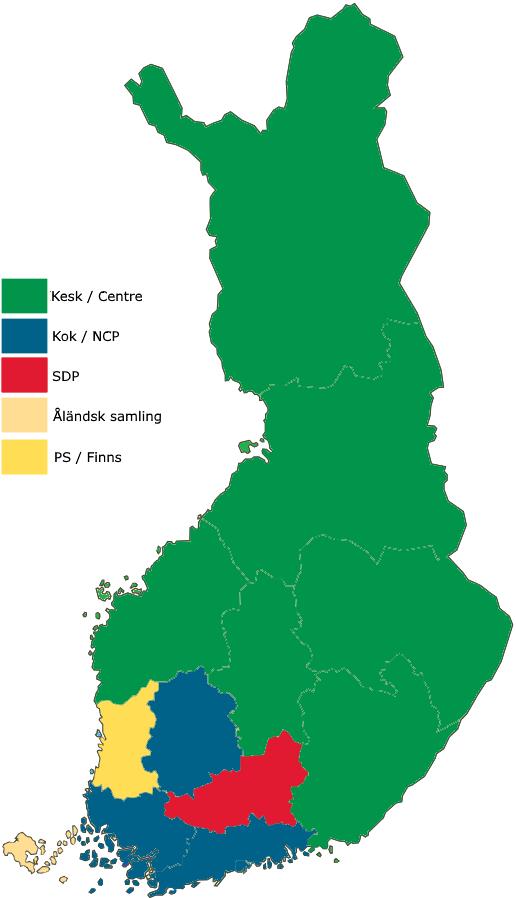
Largest party by electoral district: National Coalition Party Finns Party Centre Party Social Democratic Party Åland Coalition

Party	Votes	%	Seats	+/–
Centre Party	626,218	21.10	49	+14
Finns Party	524,054	17.65	38	−1
National Coalition Party	540,212	18.20	37	−7
Social Democratic Party	490,102	16.51	34	−8
Green League	253,102	8.53	15	+5
Left Alliance	211,702	7.13	12	−2
Swedish People's Party	144,802	4.88	9	0
Christian Democrats	105,134	3.54	5	−1
Pirate Party	25,086	0.85	0	0
Independence Party	13,638	0.46	0	0
Åland Coalition 2015 (C–M–S)	10,910	0.37	1	0
Communist Party	7,529	0.25	0	0
Change 2011	7,442	0.25	0	0
Pirkanmaa Joint List	2,469	0.08	0	New
Liberals for Åland	1,277	0.04	0	0
Communist Workers' Party	1,103	0.04	0	0
Workers' Party	984	0.03	0	0
For the Poor	623	0.02	0	0
Independents	2,075	0.07	0	0
Total	2,968,462	100.00	200	0
Valid votes	2,968,462	99.48		
Invalid/blank votes	15,397	0.52		
Total votes	2,983,859	100.00		
Registered voters/turnout	4,463,333	66.85		
Source: Ministry of Justice, YLE

== Government formation ==
As the leader of the largest party, Juha Sipilä of Centre was tasked with forming the new government coalition. In early May, Sipilä announced that he would seek to form a right-leaning majority coalition consisting of the three largest parties—the Centre Party, the Finns Party and the National Coalition Party. The coalition negotiations were successful and led to the formation of the Sipilä cabinet on 29 May.
