= Ville Kaunisto =

Finnish basketball player

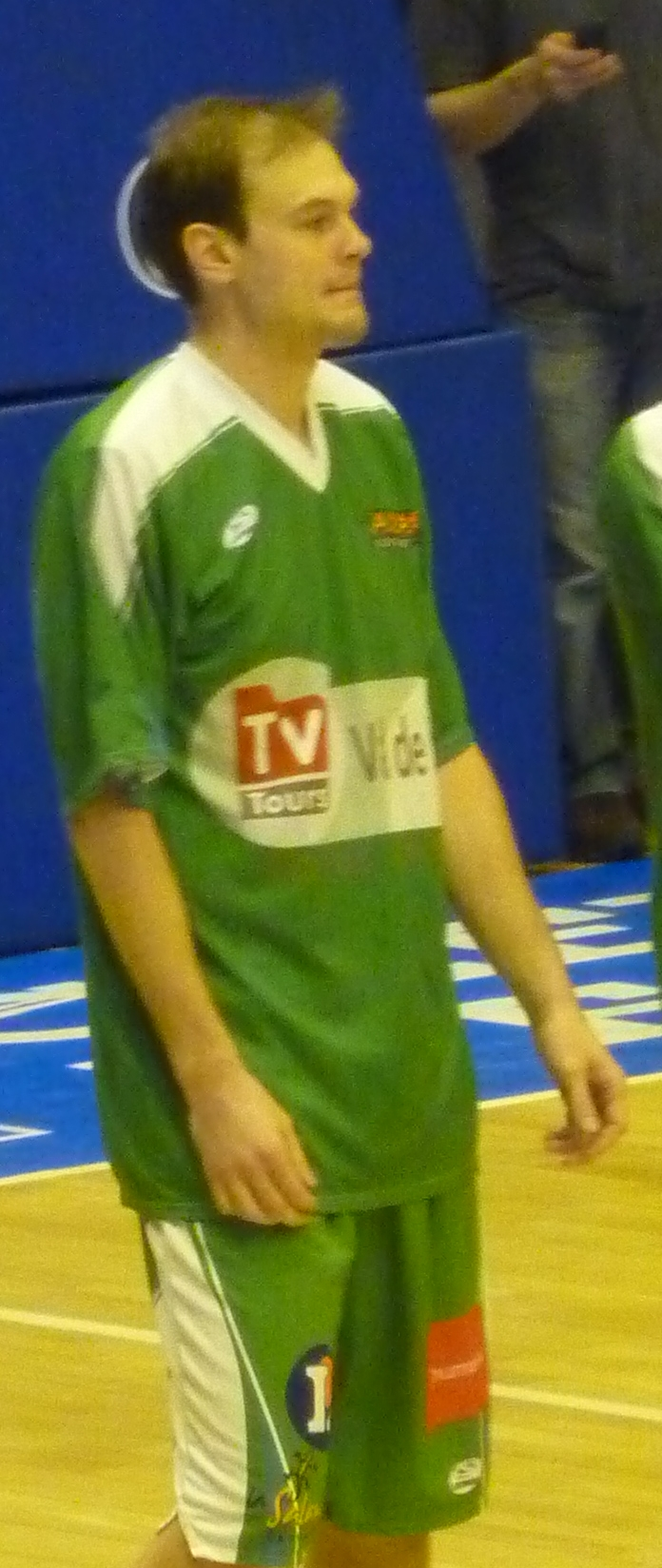
- Kaunisto with Blois in 2012

Personal information
- Born: 19 March 1982 (age 44) Turku, Finland
- Listed height: 6 ft 8.25 in (2.04 m)
- Listed weight: 230 lb (104 kg)

Career information
- NBA draft: 2004: undrafted
- Playing career: 1999–2019
- Position: Power forward
- Number: 13

Career history
- 1999–2000: Turun NMKY
- 2000–2001: Salon Vilpas
- 2002—2004: Kouvot
- 2004–2005: Fribourg Olympic
- 2005: Aurora Basket Jesi
- 2005–2006: Limoges CSP
- 2006–2007: Palencia CB
- 2007–2008: Qalat Cajasol
- 2008: Oviedo CB
- 2008–2009: CB Tarragona
- 2009: BBC Nyon
- 2009–2011: Kouvot
- 2011–2013: ADA Blois Basket 41
- 2013: Lille Métropole BC
- 2013–2019: Kouvot

Ville Valtteri Kaunisto (born 19 March 1982) is a Finnish former basketball player and politician. He last played for Kouvot of the Korisliiga and for the Finnish national basketball team. He started his professional career in 1999–00. He was elected to the Parliament of Finland in 2019.

== Career statistics ==
=== National team ===
Team	Tournament	Pos.	GP	PPG	RPG	APG
Finland	EuroBasket 2015	16th	6	1.7	2.0	0.5

== Honours ==
Kouvot

- Korisliiga
- (gold) : 2003–04, 2015-16
- (silver) : 2018-19
- (bronze) : 2009–10

Turun NMKY

- Finnish Basketball Cup
- (gold) : 1999–00
