= South Savo (parliamentary electoral district) =

Former electoral district of the Parliament of Finland

South Savo (formerly Mikkeli) was an electoral district represented in the Finnish Eduskunta (parliament). It covered the administrative region of South Savo, with a population of 163,276 (as of 2002). South Savo elected six members of the Eduskunta. The electoral district was merged with Kymi to form the new Southeastern Finland district.

The constituency is largely rural, and the only major city is Mikkeli. The traditionally dominant party in the parliamentary elections, the Centre Party, lost one seat in 2007 elections and is in even to National Coalition Party.

== Members of parliament ==
=== 2003–2007 ===
- Jouni Backman (SDP)
- Katri Komi (Kesk.)
- Jari Leppä (Kesk.)
- Olli Nepponen (Kok.)
- Pekka Nousiainen (Kesk.)
- Arto Seppälä (SDP)

=== 2007–2011 ===
- Heli Järvinen (Vihr.)
- Katri Komi (Kesk.)
- Jari Leppä (Kesk.)
- Olli Nepponen (Kok.)
- Lenita Toivakka (Kok.)
- Pauliina Viitamies (SDP)

== Election results ==
Finnish parliamentary election, 2003
Party	Seats	Net gain/loss	Seats %	Votes %	Votes	+/−
Centre	3	0	50.0	40.5	34,205	+7.0%
SDP	2	-1	33.3	32.0	27,030	+1.9%
National Coalition	1	-1	16.7	13.3	11,283	-5.8%
KD	0	0	0.0	5.7	4,810	-0.3%
Green	0	0	0.0	4.0	3,410	-1.4%
Left Alliance	0	0	0.0	2.7	2,282	-0.8%
other groups	0	0	0.0	1.9	1,500	n/a

Finnish parliamentary election, 2007
Party	Seats	Net gain/loss	Seats %	Votes %	Votes	+/−
Centre	2	-1	33.3	37.4	30,759	-3.1%
National Coalition	2	+1	33.3	18.9	15,530	+5.6%
SDP	1	-1	16.7	27.6	22,704	-4.4%
Green	1	+1	16.7	6.9	5,714	+2.9%
KD	0	0	0.0	3.6	2,925	-2.1%
Finns	0	0	0.0	3.2	2,653	+2.6%
Left Alliance	0	0	0.0	1.7	1,419	-1.0%
other groups	0	0	0.0	0.7	531	n/a

== See also ==
- Electoral districts of Finland
