= Jani Mäkelä =

Finnish politician

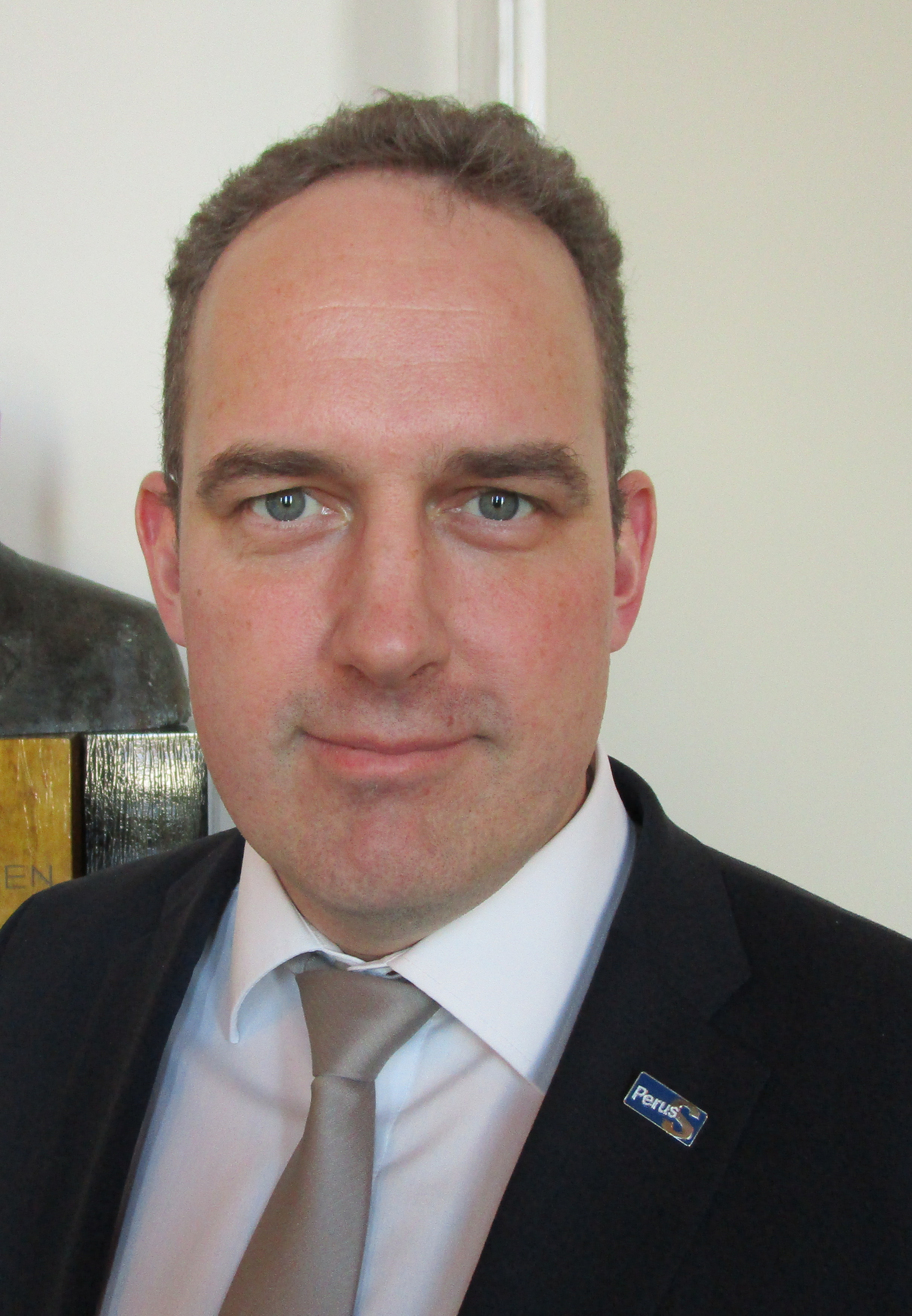

Member of the Finnish Parliament for South-Eastern Finland
- Incumbent
- Assumed office 22 April 2015

Personal details
- Party: Finns Party

Jani Kalevi Kristian Mäkelä (born 21 October 1976) is a Finnish politician currently serving in the Parliament of Finland for the Finns Party at the South-Eastern Finland constituency.
