= Suna Kymäläinen =

Finnish politician

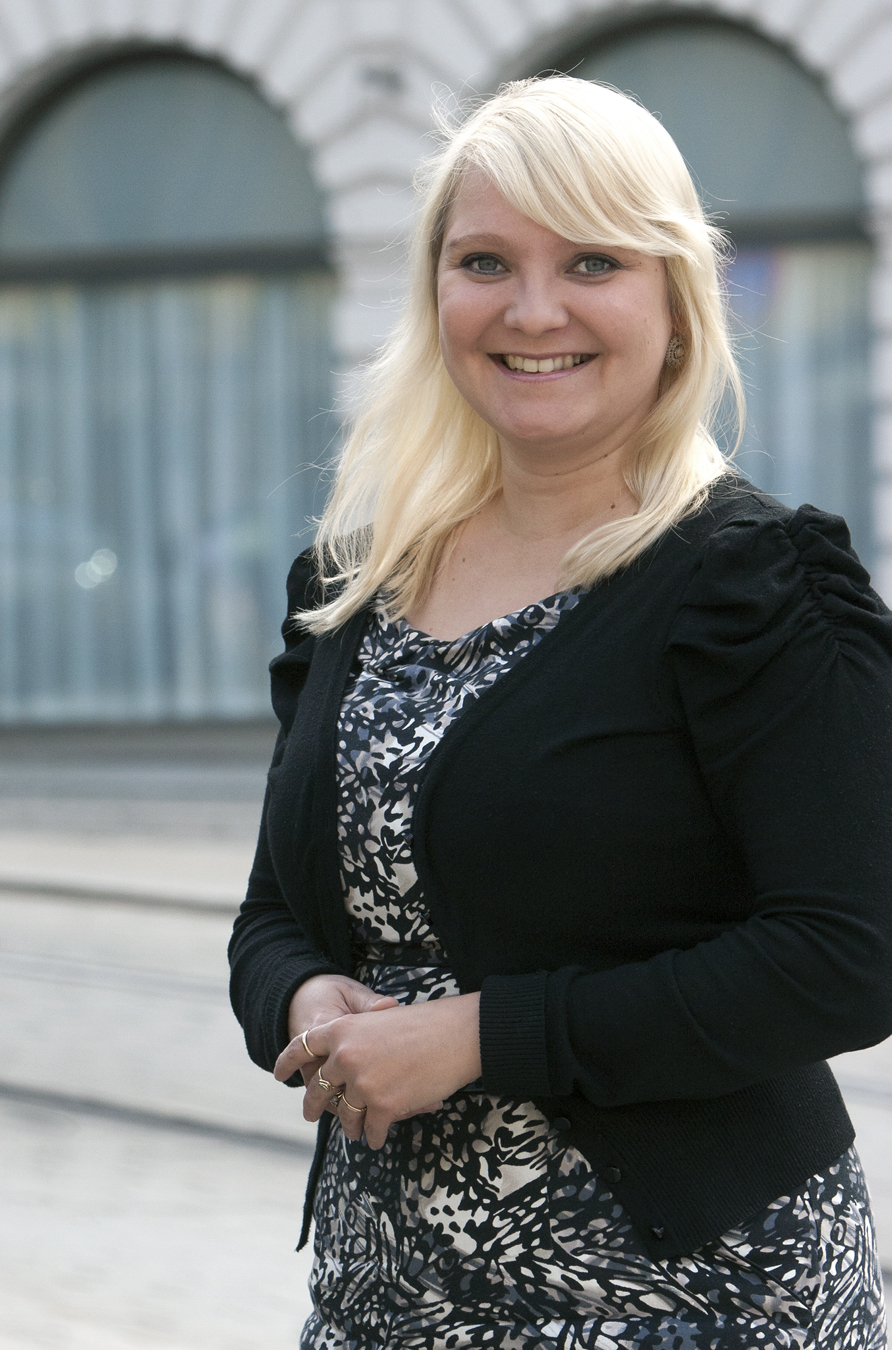

Member of the Finnish Parliament for South-Eastern Finland

Personal details
- Born: September 15, 1976 (age 49)
- Party: Social Democratic Party of Finland

Suna Ellen Kymäläinen (born 15 September 1976) is a Finnish politician currently serving in the Parliament of Finland for the Social Democratic Party of Finland at the South-Eastern Finland constituency.
