= Anneli Kiljunen =

Finnish politician (born 1957)

Member of the Finnish Parliament for South-Eastern Finland

Personal details
- Born: September 17, 1957 (age 69) Lappeenranta, South Karelia, Finland
- Party: Social Democratic Party of Finland

Leila Anneli Kiljunen (born 17 September 1957) is a Finnish politician, born in Lappeenranta, currently serving in the Parliament of Finland for the Social Democratic Party of Finland at the South-Eastern Finland constituency.
