= Heli Järvinen =

Finnish politician

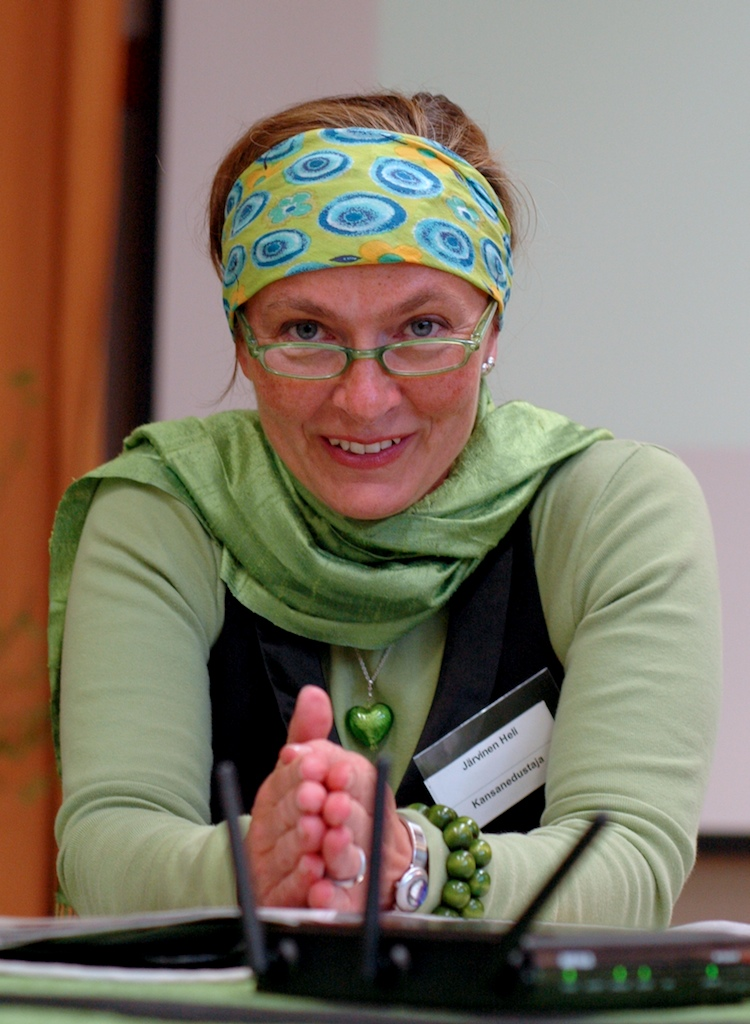
- Heli Järvinen

Member of the Finnish Parliament for Southeast Finland
- Incumbent
- Assumed office 17 April 2019
- In office 23 March 2007 – 19 April 2011

Personal details
- Born: 31 May 1963 (age 63) Tampere, Pirkanmaa, Finland
- Party: Green League
- Children: 2
- Education: University of Tampere; University of Jyväskylä
- Occupation: teacher, politician

Heli Järvinen (born 31 May 1963) is a Finnish politician for the Green League, representing the Southern Savonia constituency from 2007 to 2011 and the Southeastern Finland constituency since 2015. She was elected to the Finnish Parliament in the parliamentary election of March 2007. She lost her seat in the Parliament of Finland in 2011 elections but was again elected in 2015. She was also a member of the municipal council of Kerimäki between 2005 and 2011. Since 2017 she has been a member of Savonlinna town council. She is the second vice-chairperson of the council.

Järvinen was born in Tampere. She has a master's degree in political science from the University of Tampere and has also graduated as a teacher of communications from the University of Jyväskylä. Prior to her election to the parliament she worked as a journalist and a teacher. Järvinen is married and has two children.
