= Ari Torniainen =

Finnish politician

Member of the Finnish Parliament for South-Eastern Finland

Personal details
- Born: 15 March 1956 (age 70) Lappeenranta, South Karelia, Finland
- Party: Centre Party

Ari Juhani Torniainen (born 15 March 1956 in Lappeenranta) is a Finnish politician currently serving in the Parliament of Finland for the Centre Party at the South-Eastern Finland constituency.
