= Jukka Kopra =

Finnish politician

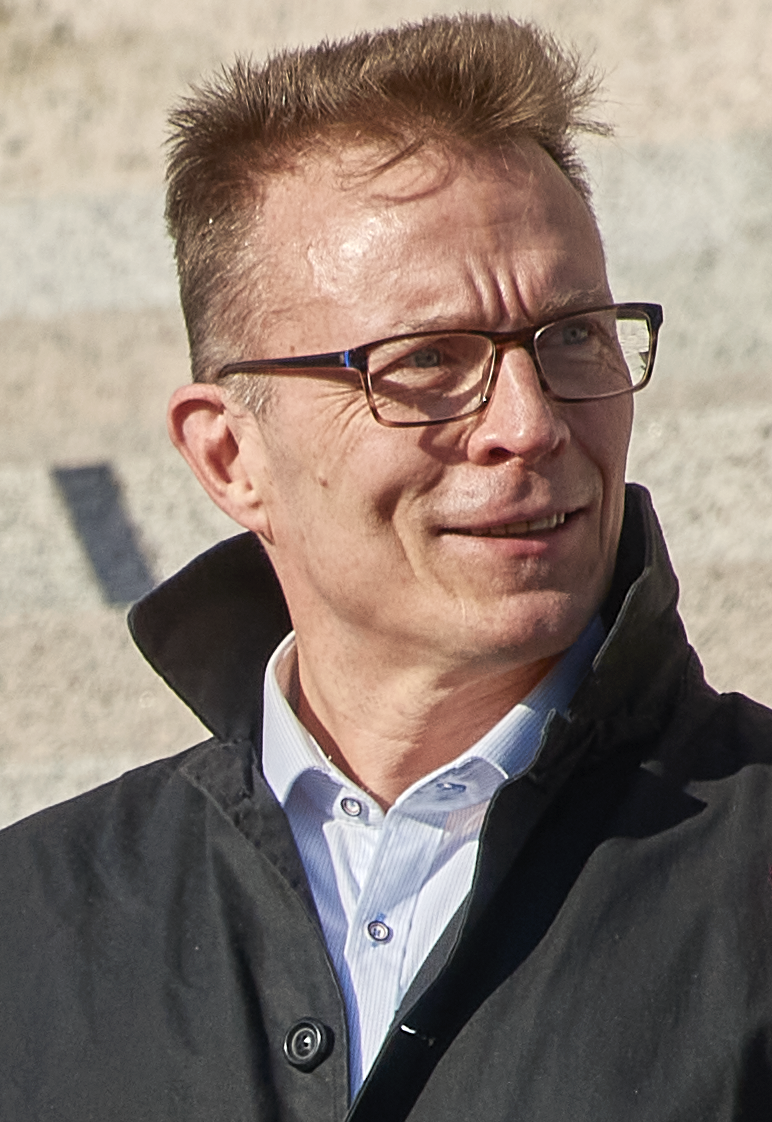
- Kopra in 2021

Member of the Finnish Parliament for South-Eastern Finland
- Incumbent
- Assumed office 20 April 2011

Personal details
- Born: February 11, 1967 (age 59) Helsinki, Uusimaa, Finland
- Party: National Coalition Party
- Education: Lappeenranta University of Technology

Jukka Matti Kopra (born 11 February 1967) is a Finnish politician currently serving in the Parliament of Finland for the National Coalition Party at the South-Eastern Finland constituency. In 2019, Kopra received a Master of Science in Technology degree from Lappeenranta University of Technology.

== Present memberships in committees ==
- Chancellery Commission (member) 02.05.2019–
- Finance Committee (deputy member) 18.06.2019–
- Subcommittee for Administration and Security (member) 06.09.2019–
- Housing and Environment Subcommittee (additional member) 06.09.2019–
- Transport and Communications Committee (deputy member) 18.06.2019–
- Defense Committee (member) 18.06.2019–
- Auditors of the Bank of Finland (member) 18.06.2019–

== Position in the parliamentary group ==
- Parliamentary Group of the National Coalition Party (2nd vice chair) 18.04.2019–
