= Oulu (parliamentary electoral district) =

Electoral district of the Parliament of Finland

- Uleåborg
- Electoral District for the Parliament of Finland
- Location of Oulu within Finland
- Municipality: List: Alavieska; Haapajärvi; Haapavesi; Hailuoto; Hyrynsalmi; Ii; Kajaani; Kalajoki; Kärsämäki; Kempele; Kuhmo; Kuusamo; Liminka; Lumijoki; Merijärvi; Muhos; Nivala; Oulainen; Oulu; Paltamo; Pudasjärvi; Puolanka; Pyhäjärvi; Pyhäjoki; Pyhäntä; Raahe; Reisjärvi; Ristijärvi; Sievi; Siikajoki; Siikalatva; Sotkamo; Suomussalmi; Taivalkoski; Tyrnävä; Utajärvi; Vaala; Ylivieska
- Region: Kainuu; North Ostrobothnia
- Population: 487,038 (2022)
- Electorate: 393,643 (2023)
- Area: 61,882 km^{2} (2022)

Current Electoral District
- Created: 1907
- Seats: List: 18 (1983–present); 17 (1975–1983); 18 (1951–1975); 17 (1945–1951); 16 (1939–1945)); 13 (1907–1939)
- Members of Parliament: List: Pekka Aittakumpu (Kesk); Juha Hänninen (Kok; Janne Heikkinen (Kok; Pia Hiltunen (SDP); Antti Kangas (PS); Tuomas Kettunen (Kesk); Merja Kyllönen (Vas); Hanna-Leena Mattila (Kesk); Timo Mehtälä (Kesk); Olga Oinas-Panuma (Kesk); Jenni Pitko (Vihr); Mikko Polvinen (PS); Hanna Sarkkinen (Vas); Jenna Simula (PS); Mari-Leena Talvitie (Kok; Tytti Tuppurainen (SDP); Sebastian Tynkkynen (PS); Ville Vähämäki (PS)

Oulu (Swedish: Uleåborg) is one of the 13 electoral districts of the Parliament of Finland, the national legislature of Finland. The district was established as Oulu Province South (Finnish: Oulun läänin eteläinen vaalipiiri; Swedish: Uleåborgs läns södra valkrets) in 1907 when the Diet of Finland was replaced by the Parliament of Finland. It was renamed Oulu Province (Finnish: Oulun lääni; Swedish: Uleåborgs län) in 1939 and Oulu in 1997. It is conterminous with the regions of Kainuu and North Ostrobothnia. The district currently elects 18 of the 200 members of the Parliament of Finland using the open party-list proportional representation electoral system. At the 2023 parliamentary election it had 393,643 registered electors.

== History ==
Oulu Province South was one 16 electoral districts established by the Election Act of the Grand Duchy of Finland (Suomen Suuriruhtinaanmaan Vaalilaki) passed by the Diet of Finland in 1906. It consisted of the hundreds (kihlakunta) of Haapajärvi, Kajaani , Saloinen and Oulu and the rural municipality (maalaiskunta) of Oulu in the province of Oulu. The district's borders were redrawn in 1938 to be conterminous with the smaller Oulu Province, absorbing parts of Oulu Province North district. The district was renamed Oulu Province at the same time. The district was renamed Oulu in 1997.

== Electoral system ==
Oulu currently elects 18 of the 200 members of the Parliament of Finland using the open party-list proportional representation electoral system. Parties may form electoral alliances with each other to pool their votes and increase their chances of winning seats. However, the number of candidates nominated by an electoral alliance may not exceed the maximum number of candidates that a single party may nominate. Seats are allocated using the D'Hondt method.

== Election results ==
=== Summary ===
Election	Left Alliance Vas / SKDL / STPV / SSTP			Green League Vihr			Social Democrats SDP / SDTP / SDP			Swedish People's SFP			Centre Kesk / ML			Liberals Lib / LKP / SK / KE / NP			National Coalition Kok / SP			Christian Democrats KD / SKL			Finns PS / SMP / SPP		
Election	Votes	%	Seats	Votes	%	Seats	Votes	%	Seats	Votes	%	Seats	Votes	%	Seats	Votes	%	Seats	Votes	%	Seats	Votes	%	Seats	Votes	%	Seats
2023	24,702	9.44%	2	13,156	5.03%	1	35,997	13.75%	2	496	0.19%	0	65,558	25.05%	5				39,228	14.99%	3	7,206	2.75%	0	66,655	25.47%	5
2019	33,820	13.07%	3	20,376	7.87%	1	26,588	10.27%	2	432	0.17%	0	78,486	30.32%	6				28,382	10.96%	2	5,728	2.21%	0	52,771	20.39%	4
2015	29,580	11.85%	2	15,524	6.22%	1	22,433	8.99%	1	1,413	0.57%	0	106,581	42.69%	9				27,089	10.85%	2	2,690	1.08%	0	40,429	16.19%	3
2011	35,422	14.54%	3	11,960	4.91%	1	26,861	11.02%	2	444	0.18%	0	81,458	33.43%	6				28,902	11.86%	2	6,717	2.76%	0	49,088	20.15%	4
2007	36,987	16.14%	3	14,102	6.15%	1	29,295	12.79%	2				98,813	43.13%	9				31,987	13.96%	3	7,290	3.18%	0	7,986	3.49%	0
2003	35,604	15.33%	3	14,077	6.06%	1	32,601	14.04%	2	353	0.15%	0	108,336	46.65%	9	389	0.17%	0	22,349	9.62%	2	12,332	5.31%	1	1,718	0.74%	0
1999	37,626	16.82%	3	13,186	5.89%	1	29,174	13.04%	2				97,204	43.45%	9	912	0.41%	0	24,891	11.13%	2	4,038	1.81%	1	2,967	1.33%	0
1995	37,809	16.44%	3	13,191	5.74%	1	37,853	16.46%	3				89,242	38.81%	9	5,529	2.40%	0	22,360	9.72%	2	3,651	1.59%	0	2,797	1.22%	0
1991	36,033	15.60%	3	13,107	5.67%	1	26,159	11.32%	2				108,072	46.78%	9	7,655	3.31%	1	25,664	11.11%	2	3,995	1.73%	0	7,732	3.35%	0
1987	39,718	16.56%	3	11,051	4.61%	1	31,233	13.02%	2				87,855	36.62%	8	2,651	1.11%	0	34,903	14.55%	3	3,870	1.61%	0	16,551	6.90%	1
1983	50,901	20.14%	4				41,294	16.34%	3				87,723	34.70%	7				36,423	14.41%	2	5,249	2.08%	0	31,055	12.29%	2
1979	64,308	26.24%	5				32,560	13.29%	2				80,832	32.99%	6	7,276	2.97%	1	35,493	14.48%	2	7,967	3.25%	0	15,568	6.35%	1
1975	62,675	27.50%	5				30,085	13.20%	2				77,292	33.91%	6	8,726	3.83%	1	27,570	12.10%	1	5,851	2.57%	1	11,883	5.21%	1
1972	53,746	25.28%	5				27,821	13.08%	2				66,564	31.31%	6	12,047	5.67%	1	22,575	10.62%	2	2,263	1.06%	0	27,289	12.83%	2
1970	51,347	24.65%	5				22,178	10.65%	2				67,721	32.52%	6	14,141	6.79%	1	19,618	9.42%	1	694	0.33%	0	31,252	15.01%	3
1966	62,425	31.91%	6				26,120	13.35%	2				74,897	38.28%	8	10,630	5.43%	1	16,907	8.64%	1	502	0.26%	0	2,820	1.44%	0
1962	60,239	31.30%	6				14,666	7.62%	1				77,911	40.48%	9	14,388	7.47%	1	14,793	7.69%	1				5,542	2.88%	0
1958	59,572	35.60%	7				17,734	10.60%	2				63,833	38.14%	7	9,364	5.60%	1	13,694	8.18%	1						
1954	52,271	31.52%	6				20,051	12.09%	2				69,228	41.74%	8	11,594	6.99%	1	12,217	7.37%	1						
1951	44,186	30.34%	6				18,799	12.91%	2				58,721	40.32%	8	10,050	6.90%	1	11,818	8.11%	1						
1948	40,452	28.20%	5				20,047	13.97%	2				59,018	41.14%	8	7,312	5.10%	1	14,120	9.84%	1						
1945	32,477	28.37%	5				17,149	14.98%	2				42,046	36.73%	7	5,669	4.95%	1	13,398	11.70%	2						
1939							20,583	24.12%	4				35,421	41.51%	8	4,176	4.89%	0	8,350	9.79%	1						
1936							12,416	20.96%	3				22,605	38.16%	6	4,141	6.99%	1	4,144	6.99%	1						
1933							9,053	16.16%	2				19,372	34.58%	5	4,163	7.43%	1	7,648	13.65%	2						
1930	490	0.80%	0				11,502	18.80%	2				32,841	53.67%	7	4,384	7.16%	1	7,181	11.73%	2						
1929	15,617	27.72%	4				4,864	8.63%	1				27,499	48.81%	7	2,952	5.24%	0	5,262	9.34%	1						
1927	11,848	25.24%	3				4,698	10.01%	1				21,569	45.95%	7	3,098	6.60%	1	5,668	12.08%	1						
1924	10,744	22.82%	3				4,792	10.18%	1				21,753	46.21%	6	3,158	6.71%	1	6,581	13.98%	2						
1922	13,483	27.02%	4				3,110	6.23%	0				23,905	47.90%	7	2,864	5.74%	0	6,525	13.07%	2						
1919							18,540	32.64%	4				26,549	46.74%	7	3,773	6.64%	0	7,876	13.87%	2						
1917							18,577	33.74%	4				20,761	37.70%	5				15,644	28.41%	4						
1916							14,149	33.87%	5				15,047	36.02%	5	4,405	10.55%	1	8,127	19.46%	2						
1913							10,993	30.49%	4				13,274	36.82%	5	3,764	10.44%	1	7,976	22.12%	3						
1911							11,838	28.65%	4				15,058	36.44%	5	4,158	10.06%	1	10,233	24.76%	3						
1910							10,661	27.80%	4				14,123	36.82%	5	4,261	11.11%	1	9,277	24.19%	3						
1909							11,846	27.59%	4				15,248	35.51%	5	4,842	11.28%	1	10,942	25.48%	3						
1908							10,419	26.07%	4				12,468	31.20%	4	4,919	12.31%	1	11,320	28.33%	4						
1907							11,557	24.90%	3	481	1.04%	0	13,569	29.24%	4	6,229	13.42%	2	14,405	31.04%	4						

(Figures in italics represent joint lists.)

=== Detailed ===
==== 2020s ====
===== 2023 =====
Results of the 2023 parliamentary election held on 2 April 2023:

Party		Party			Electoral Alliance		
Party		Votes	%	Seats	Votes	%	Seats
Finns Party	PS	66,655	25.47%	5	66,655	25.47%	5
Centre Party	Kesk	65,558	25.05%	5	65,558	25.05%	5
National Coalition Party	Kok	39,228	14.99%	3	39,228	14.99%	3
Social Democratic Party of Finland	SDP	35,997	13.75%	2	35,997	13.75%	2
Left Alliance	Vas	24,702	9.44%	2	24,702	9.44%	2
Green League	Vihr	13,156	5.03%	1	13,156	5.03%	1
Christian Democrats	KD	7,206	2.75%	0	7,319	2.80%	0
Finnish Reform Movement	KL	113	0.04%	0	7,319	2.80%	0
Freedom Alliance	VL	2,798	1.07%	0	3,520	1.34%	0
Crystal Party	KRIP	637	0.24%	0	3,520	1.34%	0
Finnish People First	SKE	85	0.03%	0	3,520	1.34%	0
Movement Now	Liik	2,793	1.07%	0	2,793	1.07%	0
Liberal Party – Freedom to Choose	Lib	1,289	0.49%	0	1,289	0.49%	0
Power Belongs to the People	VKK	778	0.30%	0	778	0.30%	0
Swedish People's Party of Finland	SFP	496	0.19%	0	496	0.19%	0
Communist Party of Finland	SKP	224	0.09%	0	224	0.09%	0
Valid votes		261,715	100.00%	18	261,715	100.00%	18
Rejected votes		994	0.38%				
Total polled		262,709	66.74%				
Registered electors		393,643					

The following candidates were elected: Pekka Aittakumpu (Kesk), 7,240 votes; Juha Hänninen (Kok), 5,251 votes; Janne Heikkinen (Kok), 6,452 votes; Pia Hiltunen (SDP), 3,426 votes; Antti Kangas (PS), 5,566 votes; Tuomas Kettunen (Kesk), 7,264 votes; Merja Kyllönen (Vas), 5,317 votes; Hanna-Leena Mattila (Kesk), 6,405 votes; Timo Mehtälä (Kesk), 5,497 votes; Olga Oinas-Panuma (Kesk), 5,173 votes; Jenni Pitko (Vihr), 3,699 votes; Mikko Polvinen (PS), 4,291 votes; Hanna Sarkkinen (Vas), 6,758 votes; Jenna Simula (PS), 9,481 votes; Mari-Leena Talvitie (Kok), 5,573 votes; Tytti Tuppurainen (SDP), 12,272 votes; Sebastian Tynkkynen (PS), 17,378 votes; and Ville Vähämäki (PS), 4,927 votes.

==== 2010s ====
===== 2019 =====
Results of the 2019 parliamentary election held on 14 April 2019:

Party		Party			Electoral Alliance		
Party		Votes	%	Seats	Votes	%	Seats
Centre Party	Kesk	78,486	30.32%	6	78,486	30.32%	6
Finns Party	PS	52,771	20.39%	4	52,771	20.39%	4
Left Alliance	Vas	33,820	13.07%	3	33,820	13.07%	3
National Coalition Party	Kok	28,382	10.96%	2	28,814	11.13%	2
Swedish People's Party of Finland	SFP	432	0.17%	0	28,814	11.13%	2
Social Democratic Party of Finland	SDP	26,588	10.27%	2	26,588	10.27%	2
Green League	Vihr	20,376	7.87%	1	20,376	7.87%	1
Christian Democrats	KD	5,728	2.21%	0	5,728	2.21%	0
Markus Kuotesaho (Independent)		4,002	1.55%	0	4,002	1.55%	0
Blue Reform	SIN	1,801	0.70%	0	2,842	1.10%	0
Citizens' Party	KP	1,041	0.40%	0	2,842	1.10%	0
Movement Now	Liik	1,593	0.62%	0	1,593	0.62%	0
Pirate Party	Pir	1,244	0.48%	0	1,533	0.59%	0
Liberal Party – Freedom to Choose	Lib	289	0.11%	0	1,533	0.59%	0
Seven Star Movement	TL	847	0.33%	0	847	0.33%	0
Authentic Finnish		589	0.23%	0	589	0.23%	0
Feminist Party	FP	383	0.15%	0	383	0.15%	0
Independence Party	IPU	213	0.08%	0	213	0.08%	0
Communist Party of Finland	SKP	134	0.05%	0	134	0.05%	0
Finnish People First	SKE	92	0.04%	0	92	0.04%	0
Communist Workers' Party – For Peace and Socialism	KTP	47	0.02%	0	47	0.02%	0
Valid votes		258,858	100.00%	18	258,858	100.00%	18
Rejected votes		1,478	0.57%				
Total polled		260,336	66.91%				
Registered electors		389,112					

The following candidates were elected: Pekka Aittakumpu (Kesk), 4,469 votes; Katja Hänninen (Vas), 4,145 votes; Janne Heikkinen (Kok), 4,136 votes; Olli Immonen (PS), 5,856 votes; Mikko Kinnunen (Kesk), 6,132 votes; Merja Kyllönen (Vas), 7,068 votes; Hanna-Leena Mattila (Kesk), 5,726 votes; Raimo Piirainen (SDP), 2,791 votes; Jenni Pitko (Vihr), 3,614 votes; Juha Pylväs (Kesk), 6,100 votes; Antti Rantakangas (Kesk), 4,478 votes; Hanna Sarkkinen (Vas), 11,153 votes; Jenna Simula (PS), 9,197 votes; Juha Sipilä (Kesk), 16,688 votes; Mari-Leena Talvitie (Kok), 5,909 votes; Tytti Tuppurainen (SDP), 9,404 votes; Sebastian Tynkkynen (PS), 9,271 votes; and Ville Vähämäki (PS), 5,072 votes.

===== 2015 =====
Results of the 2015 parliamentary election held on 19 April 2015:

Party		Votes	%	Seats
Centre Party	Kesk	106,581	42.69%	9
True Finns	PS	40,429	16.19%	3
Left Alliance	Vas	29,580	11.85%	2
National Coalition Party	Kok	27,089	10.85%	2
Social Democratic Party of Finland	SDP	22,433	8.99%	1
Green League	Vihr	15,524	6.22%	1
Christian Democrats	KD	2,690	1.08%	0
Pirate Party	Pir	1,614	0.65%	0
Swedish People's Party of Finland	SFP	1,413	0.57%	0
Independence Party	IPU	1,038	0.42%	0
Change 2011		797	0.32%	0
Communist Party of Finland	SKP	396	0.16%	0
Communist Workers' Party – For Peace and Socialism	KTP	68	0.03%	0
Valid votes		249,652	100.00%	18
Rejected votes		1,148	0.46%	
Total polled		250,800	64.97%	
Registered electors		386,036		

The following candidates were elected: Hanna Halmeenpää (Vihr), 4,860 votes; Katja Hänninen (Vas), 6,007 votes; Olli Immonen (PS), 4,964 votes; Marisanna Jarva (Kesk), 5,347 votes; Niilo Keränen (Kesk), 5,696 votes; Timo V. Korhonen (Kesk), 5,180 votes; Pirkko Mattila (PS), 6,570 votes; Ulla Parviainen (Kesk), 4,523 votes; Juha Pylväs (Kesk), 5,861 votes; Antti Rantakangas (Kesk), 5,960 votes; Hanna Sarkkinen (Vas), 9,582 votes; Juha Sipilä (Kesk), 30,758 votes; Eero Suutari (Kok), 3,303 votes; Mari-Leena Talvitie (Kok), 4,556 votes; Tapani Tölli (Kesk), 9,369 votes; Tytti Tuppurainen (SDP), 7,661 votes; Ville Vähämäki (PS), 3,798 votes; and Mirja Vehkaperä (Kesk), 5,420 votes.

===== 2011 =====
Results of the 2011 parliamentary election held on 17 April 2011:

Party		Party			Electoral Alliance		
Party		Votes	%	Seats	Votes	%	Seats
Centre Party	Kesk	81,458	33.43%	6	81,458	33.43%	6
True Finns	PS	49,088	20.15%	4	49,088	20.15%	4
Left Alliance	Vas	35,422	14.54%	3	35,422	14.54%	3
National Coalition Party	Kok	28,902	11.86%	2	28,902	11.86%	2
Social Democratic Party of Finland	SDP	26,861	11.02%	2	26,861	11.02%	2
Green League	Vihr	11,960	4.91%	1	11,960	4.91%	1
Christian Democrats	KD	6,717	2.76%	0	7,107	2.92%	0
For the Poor		201	0.08%	0	7,107	2.92%	0
Independence Party	IPU	189	0.08%	0	7,107	2.92%	0
Change 2011		862	0.35%	0	862	0.35%	0
Pirate Party	Pir	767	0.31%	0	767	0.31%	0
Swedish People's Party of Finland	SFP	444	0.18%	0	444	0.18%	0
Communist Party of Finland	SKP	337	0.14%	0	337	0.14%	0
Freedom Party – Finland's Future	VP	223	0.09%	0	223	0.09%	0
Communist Workers' Party – For Peace and Socialism	KTP	133	0.05%	0	133	0.05%	0
Esko Niskanen (Independent)		57	0.02%	0	57	0.02%	0
Workers' Party of Finland	STP	41	0.02%	0	41	0.02%	0
Valid votes		243,662	100.00%	18	243,662	100.00%	18
Rejected votes		1,184	0.48%				
Total polled		244,846	64.55%				
Registered electors		379,286					

The following candidates were elected: Satu Haapanen (Vihr), 2,315 votes; Olli Immonen (PS), 6,419 votes; Risto Kalliorinne (Vas), 5,669 votes; Inkeri Kerola (Kesk), 6,289 votes; Pentti Kettunen (PS), 3,990 votes; Martti Korhonen (Vas), 6,147 votes; Timo V. Korhonen (Kesk), 5,369 votes; Esko Kurvinen (Kok), 3,546 votes; Merja Kyllönen (Vas), 7,837 votes; Pirkko Mattila (PS), 3,947 votes; Raimo Piirainen (SDP), 4,187 votes; Antti Rantakangas (Kesk), 6,994 votes; Juha Sipilä (Kesk), 5,543 votes; Eero Suutari (Kok), 3,495 votes; Tapani Tölli (Kesk), 9,777 votes; Tytti Tuppurainen (SDP), 5,313 votes; Ville Vähämäki (PS), 5,534 votes; and Mirja Vehkaperä (Kesk), 6,852 votes.

==== 2000s ====
===== 2007 =====
Results of the 2007 parliamentary election held on 18 March 2007:

Party		Party			Electoral Alliance		
Party		Votes	%	Seats	Votes	%	Seats
Centre Party	Kesk	98,813	43.13%	9	98,813	43.13%	9
Left Alliance	Vas	36,987	16.14%	3	36,987	16.14%	3
National Coalition Party	Kok	31,987	13.96%	3	31,987	13.96%	3
Social Democratic Party of Finland	SDP	29,295	12.79%	2	29,295	12.79%	2
Green League	Vihr	14,102	6.15%	1	14,102	6.15%	1
True Finns	PS	7,986	3.49%	0	9,281	4.05%	0
Independence Party	IPU	1,295	0.57%	0	9,281	4.05%	0
Christian Democrats	KD	7,290	3.18%	0	7,713	3.37%	0
For the Poor		423	0.18%	0	7,713	3.37%	0
Communist Party of Finland	SKP	545	0.24%	0	545	0.24%	0
Communist Workers' Party – For Peace and Socialism	KTP	186	0.08%	0	186	0.08%	0
Finnish People's Blue-Whites	SKS	134	0.06%	0	134	0.06%	0
Workers' Party of Finland	STP	87	0.04%	0	87	0.04%	0
Valid votes		229,130	100.00%	18	229,130	100.00%	18
Rejected votes		1,361	0.59%				
Total polled		230,491	62.65%				
Registered electors		367,917					

The following candidates were elected: Matti Ahde (SDP), 4,783 votes; Tuomo Hänninen (Kesk), 5,851 votes; Liisa Jaakonsaari (SDP), 5,003 votes; Kyösti Karjula (Kesk), 6,016 votes; Inkeri Kerola (Kesk), 6,431 votes; Martti Korhonen (Vas), 8,234 votes; Timo V. Korhonen (Kesk), 5,597 votes; Merja Kyllönen (Vas), 7,019 votes; Suvi Lindén (Kok), 4,131 votes; Paula Lehtomäki (Kesk), 16,390 votes; Erkki Pulliainen (Vihr), 3,945 votes; Lyly Rajala (Kok), 4,019 votes; Antti Rantakangas (Kesk), 5,933 votes; Tapani Tölli (Kesk), 8,458 votes; Tuulikki Ukkola (Kok), 4,069 votes; Unto Valpas (Vas), 5,299 votes; Mirja Vehkaperä (Kesk), 6,933 votes; and Pekka Vilkuna (Kesk), 5,450 votes.

===== 2003 =====
Results of the 2003 parliamentary election held on 16 March 2003:

Party		Party			Electoral Alliance		
Party		Votes	%	Seats	Votes	%	Seats
Centre Party	Kesk	108,336	46.65%	9	108,336	46.65%	9
Left Alliance	Vas	35,604	15.33%	3	35,604	15.33%	3
Social Democratic Party of Finland	SDP	32,601	14.04%	2	32,601	14.04%	2
National Coalition Party	Kok	22,349	9.62%	2	24,067	10.36%	2
True Finns	PS	1,718	0.74%	0	24,067	10.36%	2
Green League	Vihr	14,077	6.06%	1	14,077	6.06%	1
Christian Democrats	KD	12,332	5.31%	1	12,332	5.31%	1
Forces for Change in Finland		2,327	1.00%	0	2,327	1.00%	0
Communist Party of Finland	SKP	1,862	0.80%	0	1,862	0.80%	0
Liberals	Lib	389	0.17%	0	742	0.32%	0
Swedish People's Party of Finland	SFP	353	0.15%	0	742	0.32%	0
Communist Workers' Party – For Peace and Socialism	KTP	200	0.09%	0	200	0.09%	0
Dimitrios Mizaras (Independent)		56	0.02%	0	56	0.02%	0
Marko Niemimaa (Independent)		51	0.02%	0	51	0.02%	0
Valid votes		232,255	100.00%	18	232,255	100.00%	18
Rejected votes		1,690	0.72%				
Total polled		233,945	64.87%				
Registered electors		360,625					

The following candidates were elected: Matti Ahde (SDP), 4,983 votes; Tuomo Hänninen (Kesk), 6,780 votes; Anne Huotari (Vas), 6,771 votes; Liisa Jaakonsaari (SDP), 5,425 votes; Kyösti Karjula (Kesk), 7,077 votes; Inkeri Kerola (Kesk), 6,923 votes; Martti Korhonen (Vas), 6,133 votes; Markku Koski (Kesk), 6,547 votes; Esko Kurvinen (Kok), 4,805 votes; Paula Lehtomäki (Kesk), 11,063 votes; Suvi Lindén (Kok), 3,208 votes; Riikka Moilanen-Savolainen (Kesk), 7,073 votes; Erkki Pulliainen (Vihr), 3,906 votes; Lyly Rajala (KD), 4,596 votes; Antti Rantakangas (Kesk), 8,963 votes; Tapani Tölli (Kesk), 6,476 votes; Unto Valpas (Vas), 5,884 votes; and Pekka Vilkuna (Kesk), 7,269 votes.

==== 1990s ====
===== 1999 =====
Results of the 1999 parliamentary election held on 21 March 1999:

Party		Party			Electoral Alliance		
Party		Votes	%	Seats	Votes	%	Seats
Centre Party	Kesk	97,204	43.45%	9	97,204	43.45%	9
Left Alliance	Vas	37,626	16.82%	3	37,626	16.82%	3
National Coalition Party	Kok	24,891	11.13%	2	29,841	13.34%	3
Finnish Christian League	SKL	4,038	1.81%	1	29,841	13.34%	3
Liberal People's Party	LKP	912	0.41%	0	29,841	13.34%	3
Social Democratic Party of Finland	SDP	29,174	13.04%	2	29,174	13.04%	2
Green League	Vihr	13,186	5.89%	1	13,186	5.89%	1
Reform Group	Rem	3,503	1.57%	0	6,341	2.83%	0
Alliance for Free Finland	VSL	2,838	1.27%	0	6,341	2.83%	0
Communist Party of Finland	SKP	4,719	2.11%	0	5,281	2.36%	0
Kirjava ”Puolue” – Elonkehän Puolesta	KIPU	294	0.13%	0	5,281	2.36%	0
Communist Workers' Party – For Peace and Socialism	KTP	268	0.12%	0	5,281	2.36%	0
True Finns	PS	2,967	1.33%	0	4,402	1.97%	0
Young Finns	Nuors	1,435	0.64%	0	4,402	1.97%	0
Pensioners' Party	SEP	354	0.16%	0	354	0.16%	0
Natural Law Party	LLP	290	0.13%	0	290	0.13%	0
Valid votes		223,699	100.00%	18	223,699	100.00%	18
Rejected votes		2,430	1.07%				
Total polled		226,129	64.20%				
Registered electors		352,241					

The following candidates were elected: Anne Huotari (Vas), 7,117 votes; Tytti Isohookana-Asunmaa (Kesk), 5,523 votes; Liisa Jaakonsaari (SDP), 5,630 votes; Tapio Karjalainen (SDP), 4,359 votes; Kyösti Karjula (Kesk), 5,833 votes; Marja-Leena Kemppainen (SKL), 3,764 votes; Niilo Keränen (Kesk), 7,759 votes; Inkeri Kerola (Kesk), 5,702 votes; Martti Korhonen (Vas), 5,978 votes; Esko Kurvinen (Kok), 3,595 votes; Paula Lehtomäki (Kesk), 7,821 votes; Suvi Lindén (Kok), 5,233 votes; Kari Myllyniemi (Kesk), 5,303 votes; Erkki Pulliainen (Vihr), 4,695 votes; Antti Rantakangas (Kesk), 6,775 votes; Pauli Saapunki (Kesk), 8,069 votes; Unto Valpas (Vas), 4,795 votes; and Pekka Vilkuna (Kesk), 7,721 votes.

===== 1995 =====
Results of the 1995 parliamentary election held on 19 March 1995:

Party		Party			Electoral Alliance		
Party		Votes	%	Seats	Votes	%	Seats
Centre Party	Kesk	89,242	38.81%	9	89,242	38.81%	9
Social Democratic Party of Finland	SDP	37,853	16.46%	3	37,853	16.46%	3
Left Alliance	Vas	37,809	16.44%	3	37,809	16.44%	3
National Coalition Party	Kok	22,360	9.72%	2	22,360	9.72%	2
Green League	Vihr	13,191	5.74%	1	13,191	5.74%	1
Finnish Christian League	SKL	3,651	1.59%	0	6,448	2.80%	0
Finnish Rural Party	SMP	2,797	1.22%	0	6,448	2.80%	0
Liberal People's Party	LKP	5,529	2.40%	0	5,629	2.45%	0
Ecological Party the Greens	EKO	100	0.04%	0	5,629	2.45%	0
Other Joint List (Work for Everyone)	Työ	5,181	2.25%	0	5,181	2.25%	0
Alliance for Free Finland	VSL	5,122	2.23%	0	5,122	2.23%	0
Young Finns	Nuor	5,028	2.19%	0	5,028	2.19%	0
Other Joint List		1,084	0.47%	0	1,084	0.47%	0
Communist Workers' Party – For Peace and Socialism	KTP	501	0.22%	0	501	0.22%	0
Natural Law Party	LLP	215	0.09%	0	215	0.09%	0
Joint Responsibility Party	YYP	195	0.08%	0	195	0.08%	0
Kai Mikael Aalto (Independent)		91	0.04%	0	91	0.04%	0
Valid votes		229,949	100.00%	18	229,949	100.00%	18
Rejected votes		1,940	0.84%				
Total polled		231,889	66.96%				
Registered electors		346,334					

The following candidates were elected: Juhani Alaranta (Kesk), 10,289 votes; Anne Huotari (Vas), 4,448 votes; Terttu Huttu (Vas), 3,383 votes; Tytti Isohookana-Asunmaa (Kesk), 7,698 votes; Liisa Jaakonsaari (SDP), 8,546 votes; Tapio Karjalainen (SDP), 5,260 votes; Kyösti Karjula (Kesk), 5,988 votes; Hannu Kemppainen (Kesk), 4,492 votes; Annikki Koistinen (Kesk), 5,621 votes; Martti Korhonen (Vas), 6,260 votes; Markku Koski (Kesk), 7,834 votes; Suvi Lindén (Kok), 3,519 votes; Kari Myllyniemi (Kesk), 6,948 votes; Tuija Pohjola (SDP), 2,617 votes; Erkki Pulliainen (Vihr), 4,187 votes; Pauli Saapunki (Kesk), 7,135 votes; Oiva Savela (Kok), 3,541 votes; and Maija-Liisa Veteläinen (Kesk), 5,613 votes.

===== 1991 =====
Results of the 1991 parliamentary election held on 17 March 1991:

Party		Party			Electoral Alliance		
Party		Votes	%	Seats	Votes	%	Seats
Centre Party	Kesk	108,072	46.78%	9	108,072	46.78%	9
Left Alliance	Vas	36,033	15.60%	3	36,033	15.60%	3
Social Democratic Party of Finland	SDP	26,159	11.32%	2	26,159	11.32%	2
National Coalition Party	Kok	25,664	11.11%	2	25,664	11.11%	2
Green League	Vihr	13,107	5.67%	1	13,107	5.67%	1
Liberal People's Party	LKP	7,655	3.31%	1	11,650	5.04%	1
Finnish Christian League	SKL	3,995	1.73%	0	11,650	5.04%	1
Finnish Rural Party	SMP	7,732	3.35%	0	7,800	3.38%	0
The Greens	EKO	68	0.03%	0	7,800	3.38%	0
Women's Party	NAISL	1,132	0.49%	0	1,132	0.49%	0
Communist Workers' Party – For Peace and Socialism	KTP	670	0.29%	0	670	0.29%	0
Joint Responsibility Party	YYP	572	0.25%	0	572	0.25%	0
Humanity Party		170	0.07%	0	170	0.07%	0
Valid votes		231,029	100.00%	18	231,029	100.00%	18
Blank votes		1,229	0.53%				
Rejected Votess – Other		1,653	0.71%				
Total polled		233,911	68.61%				
Registered electors		340,920					

The following candidates were elected: Juhani Alaranta (Kesk), 9,702 votes; Aarno von Bell (SDP), 2,612 votes; Kauko Heikkinen (Kesk), 6,852 votes; Tytti Isohookana-Asunmaa (Kesk), 11,064 votes; Liisa Jaakonsaari (SDP), 8,564 votes; Riitta Jouppila (Kok), 5,156 votes; Hannu Kemppainen (Kesk), 6,386 votes; Annikki Koistinen (Kesk), 8,312 votes; Martti Korhonen (Vas), 4,647 votes; Markku Koski (Kesk), 13,179 votes; Kalevi Mattila (Kesk), 6,769 votes; Osmo Polvinen (Vas), 3,447 votes; Erkki Pulliainen (Vihr), 4,796 votes; Pauli Saapunki (Kesk), 7,214 votes; Oiva Savela (Kok), 3,699 votes; Eino Siuruainen (Kesk), 8,636 votes; Tuulikki Ukkola (LKP), 7,089 votes; and Juhani Vähäkangas (Vas), 5,103 votes.

==== 1980s ====
===== 1987 =====
Results of the 1987 parliamentary election held on 15 and 16 March 1987:

Party		Party			Electoral Alliance		
Party		Votes	%	Seats	Votes	%	Seats
Centre Party	Kesk	87,855	36.62%	8	94,376	39.34%	8
Finnish Christian League	SKL	3,870	1.61%	0	94,376	39.34%	8
Liberal People's Party	LKP	2,651	1.11%	0	94,376	39.34%	8
Finnish People's Democratic League	SKDL	39,718	16.56%	3	39,718	16.56%	3
National Coalition Party	Kok	34,903	14.55%	3	34,903	14.55%	3
Social Democratic Party of Finland	SDP	31,233	13.02%	2	31,233	13.02%	2
Finnish Rural Party	SMP	16,551	6.90%	1	16,551	6.90%	1
Green League	Vihr	11,051	4.61%	1	11,051	4.61%	1
Democratic Alternative	DEVA	9,408	3.92%	0	9,408	3.92%	0
Pensioners' Party	SEP	2,646	1.10%	0	2,646	1.10%	0
Valid votes		239,886	100.00%	18	239,886	100.00%	18
Rejected votes		1,495	0.62%				
Total polled		241,381	71.18%				
Registered electors		339,137					

The following candidates were elected: Matti Ahde (SDP), 9,662 votes; Juhani Alaranta (Kesk), 8,375 votes; Kauko Heikkinen (Kesk), 6,276 votes; Tytti Isohookana-Asunmaa (Kesk), 9,316 votes; Liisa Jaakonsaari (SDP), 6,501 votes; Riitta Jouppila (Kok), 8,867 votes; Arvo Kemppainen (SKDL), 6,375 votes; Annikki Koistinen (Kesk), 6,012 votes; J. Juhani Kortesalmi (SMP), 4,926 votes; Kalevi Mattila (Kesk), 6,737 votes; Tellervo Nousiainen (Kesk), 6,434 votes; Erkki Pulliainen (Vihr), 3,762 votes; Pauli Saapunki (Kesk), 6,970 votes; Vappu Säilynoja (SKDL), 7,176 votes; Oiva Savela (Kok), 4,920 votes; Eino Siuruainen (Kesk), 6,689 votes; Juhani Vähäkangas (SKDL), 6,542 votes; and Sakari Valli (Kok), 5,435 votes.

===== 1983 =====
Results of the 1983 parliamentary election held on 20 and 21 March 1983:

Party		Party			Electoral Alliance		
Party		Votes	%	Seats	Votes	%	Seats
Centre Party and Liberal People's Party	Kesk-LKP	87,723	34.70%	7	92,972	36.78%	7
Finnish Christian League	SKL	5,249	2.08%	0	92,972	36.78%	7
Finnish People's Democratic League	SKDL	50,901	20.14%	4	50,901	20.14%	4
Social Democratic Party of Finland	SDP	41,294	16.34%	3	41,294	16.34%	3
National Coalition Party	Kok	36,423	14.41%	2	36,423	14.41%	2
Finnish Rural Party	SMP	31,055	12.29%	2	31,055	12.29%	2
Union for Democracy	KVL	123	0.05%	0	123	0.05%	0
Valid votes		252,768	100.00%	18	252,768	100.00%	18
Rejected votes		1,251	0.49%				
Total polled		254,019	75.96%				
Registered electors		334,416					

The following candidates were elected: Matti Ahde (SDP), 12,715 votes; Juhani Alaranta (Kesk), 8,673 votes; Aarno von Bell (SDP), 5,138 votes; Tytti Isohookana-Asunmaa (Kesk), 7,922 votes; Liisa Jaakonsaari (SDP), 6,439 votes; Riitta Jouppila (Kok), 7,757 votes; Arvo Kemppainen (SKDL), 6,844 votes; Hannu Kemppainen (Kesk), 8,471 votes; Pentti Kettunen (SMP), 2,928 votes; J. Juhani Kortesalmi (SMP), 15,634 votes; Kalevi Mattila (Kesk), 6,805 votes; Heikki Mustonen (SKDL), 5,091 votes; Ahti Pekkala (Kesk), 8,387 votes; Väinö Raudaskoski (Kesk), 6,396 votes; Matti Ruokola (Kesk), 6,307 votes; Vappu Säilynoja (SKDL), 7,002 votes; Juhani Vähäkangas (SKDL), 6,195 votes; and Sakari Valli (Kok), 5,482 votes.

==== 1970s ====
===== 1979 =====
Results of the 1979 parliamentary election held on 18 and 19 March 1979:

Party		Party			Electoral Alliance		
Party		Votes	%	Seats	Votes	%	Seats
Centre Party	Kesk	80,832	32.99%	6	88,108	35.95%	7
Liberal People's Party	LKP	7,276	2.97%	1	88,108	35.95%	7
Finnish People's Democratic League	SKDL	64,308	26.24%	5	64,308	26.24%	5
National Coalition Party	Kok	35,493	14.48%	2	35,493	14.48%	2
Social Democratic Party of Finland	SDP	32,560	13.29%	2	32,560	13.29%	2
Finnish Rural Party	SMP	15,568	6.35%	1	23,957	9.78%	1
Finnish Christian League	SKL	7,967	3.25%	0	23,957	9.78%	1
Constitutional People's Party	PKP	422	0.17%	0	23,957	9.78%	1
Finnish People's Unity Party	SKYP	628	0.26%	0	628	0.26%	0
Valid votes		245,054	100.00%	17	245,054	100.00%	17
Rejected votes		862	0.35%				
Total polled		245,916	76.09%				
Registered electors		323,202					

The following candidates were elected: Matti Ahde (SDP), 11,993 votes; Helvi Hyrynkangas (LKP), 7,051 votes; Liisa Jaakonsaari (SDP), 5,490 votes; Arvo Kemppainen (SKDL), 10,122 votes; J. Juhani Kortesalmi (SMP), 14,386 votes; Eero Lattula (Kok), 7,696 votes; Pentti Liedes (SKDL), 7,372 votes; Mauno Manninen (Kesk), 7,157 votes; Kalevi Mattila (Kesk), 6,977 votes; Helvi Niskanen (SKDL), 6,447 votes; Ahti Pekkala (Kesk), 8,669 votes; Väinö Raudaskoski (Kesk), 7,236 votes; Matti Ruokola (Kesk), 6,932 votes; Vappu Säilynoja (SKDL), 6,629 votes; Alvar Saukko (Kesk), 8,026 votes; Martti Ursin (Kok), 5,233 votes; and Juhani Vähäkangas (SKDL), 8,674 votes.

===== 1975 =====
Results of the 1975 parliamentary election held on 21 and 22 September 1975:

Party		Party			Electoral Alliance		
Party		Votes	%	Seats	Votes	%	Seats
Centre Party	Kesk	77,292	33.91%	6	86,018	37.74%	7
Liberal People's Party	LKP	8,726	3.83%	1	86,018	37.74%	7
Finnish People's Democratic League	SKDL	62,675	27.50%	5	62,675	27.50%	5
National Coalition Party	Kok	27,570	12.10%	1	33,421	14.66%	2
Finnish Christian League	SKL	5,851	2.57%	1	33,421	14.66%	2
Social Democratic Party of Finland	SDP	30,085	13.20%	2	30,085	13.20%	2
Finnish Rural Party	SMP	11,883	5.21%	1	12,362	5.42%	1
Party of Finnish Entrepreneurs	SYP	479	0.21%	0	12,362	5.42%	1
Finnish People's Unity Party	SKYP	3,370	1.48%	0	3,370	1.48%	0
Valid votes		227,931	100.00%	17	227,931	100.00%	17
Rejected votes		690	0.30%				
Total polled		228,621	74.41%				
Registered electors		307,247					

The following candidates were elected: Matti Ahde (SDP), 12,862 votes; Kerttu Hemmi (LKP), 7,978 votes; Kauko Hjerppe (SKDL), 6,011 votes; Aino Karjalainen (Kesk), 6,751 votes; J. Juhani Kortesalmi (SMP), 4,133 votes; Eero Lattula (Kok), 5,609 votes; Pentti Liedes (SKDL), 7,159 votes; Jouko Mäkelä (SDP), 3,859 votes; Mauno Manninen (Kesk), 6,858 votes; Veikko Matikkala (SKL), 5,532 votes; Kalevi Mattila (Kesk), 6,145 votes; Heikki Mustonen (SKDL), 5,820 votes; Helvi Niskanen (SKDL), 6,864 votes; Ahti Pekkala (Kesk), 7,691 votes; Pauli Räsänen (SKDL), 5,874 votes; Väinö Raudaskoski (Kesk), 6,737 votes; and Alvar Saukko (Kesk), 5,941 votes.

===== 1972 =====
Results of the 1972 parliamentary election held on 2 and 3 January 1972:

Party		Party			Electoral Alliance		
Party		Votes	%	Seats	Votes	%	Seats
Centre Party	Kesk	66,564	31.31%	6	66,564	31.31%	6
Finnish People's Democratic League	SKDL	53,746	25.28%	5	54,066	25.43%	5
Social Democratic Union of Workers and Smallholders	TPSL	320	0.15%	0	54,066	25.43%	5
Finnish Rural Party	SMP	27,289	12.83%	2	29,552	13.90%	2
Finnish Christian League	SKL	2,263	1.06%	0	29,552	13.90%	2
Social Democratic Party of Finland	SDP	27,821	13.08%	2	27,821	13.08%	2
National Coalition Party	Kok	22,575	10.62%	2	22,575	10.62%	2
Liberal People's Party	LKP	12,047	5.67%	1	12,047	5.67%	1
Valid votes		212,625	100.00%	18	212,625	100.00%	18
Rejected votes		631	0.30%				
Total polled		213,256	83.67%				
Registered electors		254,888					

The following candidates were elected: Matti Ahde (SDP), 11,883 votes; Erkki Haukipuro (Kesk), 5,966 votes; Kerttu Hemmi (LKP), 5,215 votes; Reino Kangas (Kesk), 4,918 votes; Aino Karjalainen (Kesk), 5,624 votes; Rauno Korpinen (SKDL), 4,790 votes; J. Juhani Kortesalmi (SMP), 5,154 votes; Gunnar Laatio (Kok), 5,534 votes; Eero Lattula (Kok), 2,345 votes; Pentti Liedes (SKDL), 7,082 votes; Lauri Linna (SMP), 3,887 votes; Heikki Mustonen (SKDL), 4,480 votes; Paavo Niinikoski (Kesk), 5,199 votes; Helvi Niskanen (SKDL), 4,442 votes; Ahti Pekkala (Kesk), 5,649 votes; Pauli Räsänen (SKDL), 5,483 votes; Matti Ruokola (Kesk), 5,174 votes; and Ville Tikkanen (SDP), 4,834 votes.

===== 1970 =====
Results of the 1970 parliamentary election held on 15 and 16 March 1970:

Party		Votes	%	Seats
Centre Party	Kesk	67,721	32.52%	6
Finnish People's Democratic League	SKDL	51,347	24.65%	5
Finnish Rural Party	SMP	31,252	15.01%	3
Social Democratic Party of Finland	SDP	22,178	10.65%	2
National Coalition Party	Kok	19,618	9.42%	1
Liberal People's Party	LKP	14,141	6.79%	1
Finnish Christian League	SKL	694	0.33%	0
Social Democratic Union of Workers and Smallholders	TPSL	490	0.24%	0
Others		831	0.40%	0
Valid votes		208,272	100.00%	18
Rejected votes		577	0.28%	
Total polled		208,849	82.94%	
Registered electors		251,805		

The following candidates were elected: Matti Ahde (SDP), 3,251 votes; Erkki Haukipuro (Kesk), 5,081 votes; Kerttu Hemmi (LKP), 2,310 votes; Kauko Hjerppe (SKDL), 3,732 votes; Antti Isomursu (SMP), 3,084 votes; Reino Kangas (Kesk), 4,262 votes; J. Juhani Kortesalmi (SMP), 4,043 votes; Gunnar Laatio (Kok), 5,301 votes; Pentti Liedes (SKDL), 7,484 votes; Lauri Linna (SMP), 4,231 votes; Heikki Mustonen (SKDL), 4,258 votes; Paavo Niinikoski (Kesk), 4,977 votes; Helvi Niskanen (SKDL), 3,829 votes; Eemil Partanen (Kesk), 5,209 votes; Ahti Pekkala (Kesk), 5,569 votes; Pauli Räsänen (SKDL), 5,348 votes; Matti Ruokola (Kesk), 4,665 votes; and Antero Väyrynen (SDP), 6,717 votes.

==== 1960s ====
===== 1966 =====
Results of the 1966 parliamentary election held on 20 and 21 March 1966:

Party		Party			Electoral Alliance		
Party		Votes	%	Seats	Votes	%	Seats
Centre Party	Kesk	74,897	38.28%	8	74,897	38.28%	8
Finnish People's Democratic League	SKDL	62,425	31.91%	6	63,757	32.59%	6
Social Democratic Union of Workers and Smallholders	TPSL	1,332	0.68%	0	63,757	32.59%	6
Social Democratic Party of Finland	SDP	26,120	13.35%	2	26,120	13.35%	2
National Coalition Party	Kok	16,907	8.64%	1	17,409	8.90%	1
Finnish Christian League	SKL	502	0.26%	0	17,409	8.90%	1
Liberal People's Party	LKP	10,630	5.43%	1	13,450	6.87%	1
Smallholders' Party of Finland	SPP	2,820	1.44%	0	13,450	6.87%	
Write-in lists		7	0.00%	0	7	0.00%	0
Valid Votes		195,640	100.00%	18	195,640	100.00%	18
Blank Votes		103	0.05%				
Rejected Votess – Other		650	0.33%				
Total Polled		196,393	86.75%				
Registered Electors		226,378					

The following candidates were elected: Erkki Haukipuro (Kesk), 5,055 votes; Kauko Hjerppe (SKDL), 5,013 votes; Reino Kangas (Kesk), 5,321 votes; Matti Kekkonen (Kesk), 4,704 votes; Jaakko Kemppainen (Kok), 4,853 votes; Antti Kinnunen (SKDL), 5,213 votes; Paavo Lagerroos (SKDL), 5,189 votes; Armas Leinonen (LKP), 3,637 votes; Martti Linna (SKDL), 4,917 votes; Heikki Mustonen (SKDL), 5,631 votes; Paavo Niinikoski (Kesk), 4,990 votes; Hannes Paaso (Kesk), 4,939 votes; Eemil Partanen (Kesk), 6,164 votes; Pauli Räsänen (SKDL), 6,882 votes; Niilo Ryhtä (Kesk), 5,330 votes; Kerttu Saalasti (Kesk), 8,609 votes; Ville Tikkanen (SDP), 3,802 votes; and Antero Väyrynen (SDP), 9,806 votes.

===== 1962 =====
Results of the 1962 parliamentary election held on 4 and 5 February 1962:

Party		Party			Electoral Alliance		
Party		Votes	%	Seats	Votes	%	Seats
Agrarian Party	ML	77,911	40.48%	9	78,924	41.00%	9
Smallholders' Party Opposition		1,013	0.53%	0	78,924	41.00%	9
Finnish People's Democratic League	SKDL	60,239	31.30%	6	60,239	31.30%	6
National Coalition Party	Kok	14,793	7.69%	1	14,793	7.69%	1
Social Democratic Party of Finland	SDP	14,666	7.62%	1	14,666	7.62%	1
People's Party of Finland	SK	14,388	7.47%	1	14,388	7.47%	1
Smallholders' Party of Finland	SPP	5,542	2.88%	0	5,542	2.88%	0
Social Democratic Union of Workers and Smallholders	TPSL	3,932	2.04%	0	3,932	2.04%	0
Valid votes		192,484	100.00%	18	192,484	100.00%	18
Rejected votes		801	0.41%				
Total polled		193,285	88.20%				
Registered electors		219,149					

The following candidates were elected: Eeli Erkkilä (ML), 6,113 votes; Yrjö Hautala (ML), 4,495 votes; Veikko Honkanen (ML), 5,364 votes; Eero Juntunen (ML), 4,882 votes; Reino Kangas (ML), 4,834 votes; Matti Kekkonen (ML), 7,298 votes; Jaakko Kemppainen (Kok), 5,494 votes; Antti Kinnunen (SKDL), 4,574 votes; Armas Leinonen (SK), 6,176 votes; Pentti Liedes (SKDL), 7,005 votes; Martti Linna (SKDL), 5,752 votes; Yrjö Murto (SKDL), 4,811 votes; Hannes Paaso (ML), 7,037 votes; Eemil Partanen (ML), 6,669 votes; Niilo Ryhtä (ML), 5,287 votes; Hannes Tauriainen (SKDL), 4,655 votes; Irma Torvi (SKDL), 6,173 votes; and Antero Väyrynen (SDP), 3,663 votes.

==== 1950s ====
===== 1958 =====
Results of the 1958 parliamentary election held on 6 and 7 July 1958:

Party		Party			Electoral Alliance		
Party		Votes	%	Seats	Votes	%	Seats
Agrarian Party	ML	63,833	38.14%	7	63,833	38.14%	7
Finnish People's Democratic League	SKDL	59,572	35.60%	7	59,572	35.60%	7
National Coalition Party	Kok	13,694	8.18%	1	23,448	14.01%	2
People's Party of Finland	SK	9,364	5.60%	1	23,448	14.01%	2
Liberal League	VL	390	0.23%	0	23,448	14.01%	2
Social Democratic Party of Finland	SDP	17,734	10.60%	2	17,734	10.60%	2
Agrarian Party Opposition	MLO	2,745	1.64%	0	2,745	1.64%	0
Write-in lists		17	0.01%	0	17	0.01%	0
Valid votes		167,349	100.00%	18	167,349	100.00%	18
Rejected votes		941	0.56%				
Total polled		168,290	79.31%				
Registered electors		212,196					

The following candidates were elected: Eeli Erkkilä (ML), 4,309 votes; Kusti Eskola (ML), 5,890 votes; Eetu Karjalainen (SDP), 3,941 votes; Matti Kekkonen (ML), 5,833 votes; Jaakko Kemppainen (Kok), 4,786 votes; Armas Leinonen (SK), 3,956 votes; Pentti Liedes (SKDL), 4,302 votes; Martti Linna (SKDL), 4,009 votes; Matti Meriläinen (SKDL), 4,221 votes; Yrjö Murto (SKDL), 6,831 votes; Heikki Mustonen (SKDL), 5,631 votes; Janne Mustonen (SKDL), 5,060 votes; Hannes Paaso (ML), 4,243 votes; Eemil Partanen (ML), 4,104 votes; Niilo Ryhtä (ML), 4,747 votes; Kerttu Saalasti (ML), 6,009 votes; Hannes Tauriainen (SKDL), 4,050 votes; and Arvi Turkka (SDP), 4,003 votes.

===== 1954 =====
Results of the 1954 parliamentary election held on 7 and 8 March 1954:

Party		Party			Electoral Alliance		
Party		Votes	%	Seats	Votes	%	Seats
Agrarian Party	ML	69,228	41.74%	8	69,228	41.74%	8
Finnish People's Democratic League	SKDL	52,271	31.52%	6	52,271	31.52%	6
Social Democratic Party of Finland	SDP	20,051	12.09%	2	20,051	12.09%	2
National Coalition Party	Kok	12,217	7.37%	1	12,468	7.52%	1
Liberal League	VL	251	0.15%	0	12,468	7.52%	1
People's Party of Finland	SK	11,594	6.99%	1	11,834	7.13%	1
Small Farmers Party		240	0.14%	0	11,834	7.13%	1
Write-in lists		8	0.00%	0	8	0.00%	0
Valid votes		165,860	100.00%	18	165,860	100.00%	18
Rejected votes		1,175	0.70%				
Total polled		167,035	81.81%				
Registered electors		204,185					

The following candidates were elected: Eeli Erkkilä (ML); Kusti Eskola (ML); Yrjö Hautala (ML); Lauri Järvi (Kok); Eetu Karjalainen (SDP); Urho Kekkonen (ML); Antti Kinnunen (SKDL); Armas Leinonen (SK); Pentti Liedes (SKDL); Yrjö Murto (SKDL); Janne Mustonen (SKDL); Eemil Partanen (ML); Niilo Ryhtä (ML); Eino Rytinki (ML); Kerttu Saalasti (ML); Hannes Tauriainen (SKDL); Irma Torvi (SKDL); and Arvi Turkka (SDP).

===== 1951 =====
Results of the 1951 parliamentary election held on 1 and 2 July 1951:

Party		Party			Electoral Alliance		
Party		Votes	%	Seats	Votes	%	Seats
Agrarian Party	ML	58,721	40.32%	8	58,721	40.32%	8
Finnish People's Democratic League	SKDL	44,186	30.34%	6	44,186	30.34%	6
Social Democratic Party of Finland	SDP	18,799	12.91%	2	18,799	12.91%	2
National Coalition Party	Kok	11,818	8.11%	1	11,932	8.19%	1
Liberal League	VL	114	0.08%	0	11,932	8.19%	1
People's Party of Finland	SK	10,050	6.90%	1	10,050	6.90%	1
Small Farmers Party		1,932	1.33%	0	1,932	1.33%	0
Write-in lists		16	0.01%	0	16	0.01%	0
Valid votes		145,636	100.00%	18	145,636	100.00%	18
Rejected votes		1,362	0.93%				
Total polled		146,998	75.15%				
Registered electors		195,607					

The following candidates were elected: Arvi Ahmavaara (Kok); Eeli Erkkilä (ML); Kusti Eskola (ML); Esteri Häikiö (SKDL); Yrjö Hautala (ML); Heikki Kannisto (SK); Eetu Karjalainen (SDP); Aaro Kauppi (ML); Urho Kekkonen (ML); Antti Kinnunen (SKDL); Matti Meriläinen (SKDL); Yrjö Murto (SKDL); Janne Mustonen (SKDL); Niilo Ryhtä (ML); Eino Rytinki (ML); Kerttu Saalasti (ML); Hannes Tauriainen (SKDL); and Arvi Turkka (SDP).

==== 1940s ====
===== 1948 =====
Results of the 1948 parliamentary election held on 1 and 2 July 1948:

Party		Party			Electoral Alliance		
Party		Votes	%	Seats	Votes	%	Seats
Agrarian Party	ML	59,018	41.14%	8	59,018	41.14%	8
Finnish People's Democratic League	SKDL	40,452	28.20%	5	40,452	28.20%	5
Social Democratic Party of Finland	SDP	20,047	13.97%	2	20,047	13.97%	2
National Coalition Party	Kok	14,120	9.84%	1	14,120	9.84%	1
National Progressive Party	KE	7,312	5.10%	1	9,511	6.63%	1
Small Farmers Party		2,199	1.53%	0	9,511	6.63%	1
Write-in lists		304	0.21%	0	304	0.21%	0
Valid votes		143,452	100.00%	17	143,452	100.00%	17
Rejected votes		615	0.43%				
Total polled		144,067	78.50%				
Registered electors		183,521					

The following candidates were elected: Arvi Ahmavaara (Kok); Kusti Eskola (ML); Yrjö Hautala (ML); Heikki Kannisto (SK); Urho Kekkonen (ML); Antti Koukkari (ML); Matti Meriläinen (SKDL); Yrjö Murto (SKDL); Janne Mustonen (SKDL); Niilo Ryhtä (ML); Kerttu Saalasti (ML); Yrjö Saari (ML); Sulo Salo (ML); Heikki Simonen (SDP); Ilmari Sormunen (SKDL); Hannes Tauriainen (SKDL); and Arvi Turkka (SDP).

===== 1945 =====
Results of the 1945 parliamentary election held on 17 and 18 March 1945:

Party		Party			Electoral Alliance		
Party		Votes	%	Seats	Votes	%	Seats
Agrarian Party	ML	42,046	36.73%	7	47,715	41.68%	8
National Progressive Party	KE	5,669	4.95%	1	47,715	41.68%	8
Finnish People's Democratic League	SKDL	32,477	28.37%	5	32,477	28.37%	5
Social Democratic Party of Finland	SDP	17,149	14.98%	2	17,149	14.98%	2
National Coalition Party	Kok	13,398	11.70%	2	13,398	11.70%	2
Small Farmers Party		3,437	3.00%	0	3,437	3.00%	0
Write-in lists		305	0.27%	0	305	0.27%	0
Valid votes		114,481	100.00%	17	114,481	100.00%	17
Rejected votes		527	0.46%				
Total polled		115,008	69.48%				
Registered electors		165,530					

The following candidates were elected: Arvi Ahmavaara (Kok); Kusti Eskola (ML); Yrjö Hautala (ML); Matti Huhta (SKDL); Lauri Järvi (Kok); Heikki Kannisto (SK); Eetu Karjalainen (SDP); Urho Kekkonen (ML); Antti Koukkari (ML); Matti Meriläinen (SKDL); Janne Mustonen (SKDL); Sulo Muuri (SKDL); Eemil Pääkkönen (ML); Juho Pyörälä (ML); Sulo Salo (ML); Heikki Simonen (SDP); and Ilmari Sormunen (SKDL).

==== 1930s ====
===== 1939 =====
Results of the 1939 parliamentary election held on 1 and 2 July 1939:

Party		Votes	%	Seats
Agrarian Party	ML	35,421	41.51%	8
Social Democratic Party of Finland	SDP	20,583	24.12%	4
Party of Smallholders and Rural People	PMP	12,421	14.56%	2
National Coalition Party	Kok	8,350	9.79%	1
Patriotic People's Movement	IKL	4,305	5.05%	1
National Progressive Party	KE	4,176	4.89%	0
Write-in lists		69	0.08%	0
Valid votes		85,325	100.00%	16
Rejected votes		277	0.32%	
Total polled		85,602	62.65%	
Registered electors		136,630		

The following candidates were elected: Kusti Arhama (ML); Toivo Janhonen (ML); Eetu Karjalainen (SDP); Vilho Kivioja (ML); Väinö Kokko (Kok); Hjalmar Lindqvist (SDP); Kalle Lohi (ML); Kalle Määttä (ML); Heikki Niskanen (PMP); Eero Nurmesniemi (ML); Eino Rytinki (PMP); Sulo Salo (ML); Heikki Simonen (SDP); Arvi Turkka (SDP); Uuno Antti Virranniemi (ML); and Veikko Wainio (IKL).

===== 1936 =====
Results of the 1936 parliamentary election held on 1 and 2 July 1936:

Party		Votes	%	Seats
Agrarian Party	ML	22,605	38.16%	6
Social Democratic Party of Finland	SDP	12,416	20.96%	3
People's Party	KP	6,782	11.45%	1
Patriotic People's Movement	IKL	5,116	8.64%	1
National Coalition Party	Kok	4,144	6.99%	1
National Progressive Party	KE	4,141	6.99%	1
Small Farmers' Party of Finland	SPP	3,725	6.29%	0
Others		315	0.53%	0
Valid votes		59,244	100.00%	13
Rejected votes		544	0.91%	
Total polled		59,788	56.49%	
Registered electors		105,845		

The following candidates were elected: Kusti Arhama (ML); Toivo Janhonen (ML); Kyösti Kallio (ML); Heikki Kannisto (KE); Eetu Karjalainen (SDP); Vilho Kivioja (ML); Väinö Kokko (Kok); Antti Meriläinen (SDP); Heikki Niskanen (KP); Eero Nurmesniemi (ML); Sulo Salo (ML); Arvi Turkka (SDP); and Veikko Wainio (IKL).

===== 1933 =====
Results of the 1933 parliamentary election held on 1, 2 and 3 July 1933:

Party		Votes	%	Seats
Agrarian Party	ML	19,372	34.58%	5
Social Democratic Labour Party of Finland	SDTP	9,053	16.16%	2
People's Party	KP	8,552	15.27%	2
National Coalition Party and Patriotic People's Movement	Kok-IKL	7,648	13.65%	2
Small Farmers' Party of Finland	SPP	6,429	11.48%	1
National Progressive Party	KE	4,163	7.43%	1
Recession Men		645	1.15%	0
National Socialist Union of Finland	SKSL	103	0.18%	0
Write-in lists		57	0.10%	0
Valid votes		56,022	100.00%	13
Rejected votes		260	0.46%	
Total polled		56,282	56.03%	
Registered electors		100,457		

The following candidates were elected: Kusti Arffman (ML); Yrjö Hautala (KP); Toivo Janhonen (ML); Emil Jatkola (KE); Kyösti Kallio (ML); Yrjö Kesti (SPP); Vilho Kivioja (ML); K. F. Lehtonen (Kok-IKL); Antti Meriläinen (SDTP); Heikki Niskanen (KP); Sulo Salo (ML); Arvi Turkka (SDTP); and Veikko Wainio (Kok-IKL).

===== 1930 =====
Results of the 1930 parliamentary election held on 1 and 2 October 1930:

Party		Party			Electoral Alliance		
Party		Votes	%	Seats	Votes	%	Seats
Agrarian Party	ML	32,841	53.67%	7	44,406	72.57%	10
National Coalition Party	Kok	7,181	11.73%	2	44,406	72.57%	10
National Progressive Party	KE	4,384	7.16%	1	44,406	72.57%	10
Social Democratic Labour Party of Finland	SDTP	11,502	18.80%	2	11,502	18.80%	2
Small Farmers' Party of Finland	SPP	4,747	7.76%	1	4,747	7.76%	1
Socialist Electoral Organisation of Workers and Smallholders	STPV	490	0.80%	0	490	0.80%	0
Write-in lists		49	0.08%	0	49	0.08%	0
Valid votes		61,194	100.00%	13	61,194	100.00%	13
Rejected votes		272	0.44%				
Total polled		61,466	64.00%				
Registered electors		96,043					

The following candidates were elected: Sakari Ainali (Kok); Hannes Eskola (ML); Edvard Huttunen (SDTP); Toivo Janhonen (ML); Emil Jatkola (KE); Kyösti Kallio (ML); Yrjö Kesti (SPP); Vilho Kivioja (ML); Johannes Korhonen (ML); Antti Meriläinen (SDTP); Eero Nurmesniemi (ML); Sulo Salo (ML); and Samuli Tuomikoski (Kok).

==== 1920s ====
===== 1929 =====
Results of the 1929 parliamentary election held on 1 and 2 July 1929:

Party		Votes	%	Seats
Agrarian Party	ML	27,499	48.81%	7
Socialist Electoral Organisation of Workers and Smallholders	STPV	15,617	27.72%	4
National Coalition Party	Kok	5,262	9.34%	1
Social Democratic Labour Party of Finland	SDTP	4,864	8.63%	1
National Progressive Party	KE	2,952	5.24%	0
Write-in lists		140	0.25%	0
Valid votes		56,334	100.00%	13
Rejected votes		276	0.49%	
Total polled		56,610	57.46%	
Registered electors		98,517		

The following candidates were elected: Kusti Arffman (ML); Edvard Huttunen (SDTP); Toivo Janhonen (ML); Kyösti Kallio (ML); Vilho Kivioja (ML); Kalle Kyhälä (STPV); Kalle Meriläinen (STPV); Lauri Mustakallio (ML); Matti Niilekselä (ML); Eero Nurmesniemi (ML); Mauritz Rosenberg (STPV); Samuli Tuomikoski (Kok); and Siina Urpilainen (STPV).

===== 1927 =====
Results of the 1927 parliamentary election held on 1 and 2 July 1927:

Party		Votes	%	Seats
Agrarian Party	ML	21,569	45.95%	7
Socialist Electoral Organisation of Workers and Smallholders	STPV	11,848	25.24%	3
National Coalition Party	Kok	5,668	12.08%	1
Social Democratic Labour Party of Finland	SDTP	4,698	10.01%	1
National Progressive Party	KE	3,098	6.60%	1
Write-in lists		56	0.12%	0
Valid votes		46,937	100.00%	13
Rejected votes		218	0.46%	
Total polled		47,155	50.22%	
Registered electors		93,905		

The following candidates were elected: Sakari Ainali (Kok); Kusti Arffman (ML); Edvard Huttunen (SDTP); Toivo Janhonen (ML); Kyösti Kallio (ML); Heikki Karjalainen (KE); Lauri Mustakallio (ML); Matti Niilekselä (ML); Eero Nurmesniemi (ML); Mauritz Rosenberg (STPV); Sulo Salo (ML); Filemon Savenius (STPV); and Siina Urpilainen (STPV).

===== 1924 =====
Results of the 1924 parliamentary election held on 1 and 2 April 1924:

Party		Votes	%	Seats
Agrarian Party	ML	21,753	46.21%	6
Socialist Electoral Organisation of Workers and Smallholders	STPV	10,744	22.82%	3
National Coalition Party	Kok	6,581	13.98%	2
Social Democratic Labour Party of Finland	SDTP	4,792	10.18%	1
National Progressive Party	KE	3,158	6.71%	1
Write-in lists		46	0.10%	0
Valid votes		47,074	100.00%	13
Rejected votes		209	0.44%	
Total polled		47,283	54.24%	
Registered electors		87,175		

The following candidates were elected: Sakari Ainali (Kok); Kusti Arffman (ML); Uuno Brander (KE); Toivo Janhonen (ML); Kyösti Kallio (ML); J. A. Mannermaa (Kok); Niilo Pelttari (ML); Vilho Piippo (SDTP); Janne Räsänen (STPV); Mauritz Rosenberg (STPV); Sulo Salo (ML); Filemon Savenius (STPV); and Jaakko Seppänen (ML).

===== 1922 =====
Results of the 1922 parliamentary election held on 1, 2 and 3 July 1922:

Party		Votes	%	Seats
Agrarian Party	ML	23,905	47.90%	7
Socialist Workers' Party of Finland	SSTP	13,483	27.02%	4
National Coalition Party	Kok	6,525	13.07%	2
Social Democratic Labour Party of Finland	SDTP	3,110	6.23%	0
National Progressive Party	KE	2,864	5.74%	0
Write-in lists		19	0.04%	0
Valid votes		49,906	100.00%	13
Rejected votes		284	0.57%	
Total polled		50,190	58.94%	
Registered electors		85,155		

The following candidates were elected: Kusti Arffman (ML); Kustaa Hautamäki (ML); Kyösti Kallio (ML); Pekka Kemppi (SSTP); J. A. Mannermaa (Kok); Lauri Mustakallio (ML); Antti Nahkala (SSTP); Aarno Pesonen (ML); August Rytkönen (SSTP); Sulo Salo (ML); Jaakko Seppänen (ML); Veli Kustaa Simelius (Kok); and Yrjö Valkama (SSTP).

==== 1910s ====
===== 1919 =====
Results of the 1919 parliamentary election held on 1, 2 and 3 March 1919:

Party		Votes	%	Seats
Agrarian Party	ML	26,549	46.74%	7
Social Democratic Labour Party of Finland	SDTP	18,540	32.64%	4
National Coalition Party	Kok	7,876	13.87%	2
National Progressive Party	KE	3,773	6.64%	0
Write-in lists		66	0.12%	0
Valid votes		56,804	100.00%	13
Rejected votes		221	0.39%	
Total polled		57,025	67.12%	
Registered electors		84,965		

The following candidates were elected: Kusti Arffman (Note: Kusti Arffman (Arhama) (ML) is not showing as elected from Oulu Province South at the 1919 parliamentary election in Valtiopäivät 1919: Pöytäkirjat I - Istunnot 1-53 - Valtiopäivien alusta heinäkuun 26 päivään but Parliament of Finland website shows him to be a member for Oulu Province South from 1917 to 1930.) (ML); Kustavi Elovaara (ML); Juho Heikkinen (ML); Väinö Juustila (Kok); Kyösti Kallio (ML); Matti Laukkonen (SDTP); Antti Meriläinen (SDTP); Vilho Niemi (SDTP); Matti Oja (ML); Aarno Pesonen (ML); Yrjö Pesonen (ML); Heikki Törmä (SDTP); and Leonard Typpö (Kok).

===== 1917 =====
Results of the 1917 parliamentary election held on 1 and 2 October 1917:

Party		Votes	%	Seats
Agrarian Party	ML	20,761	37.70%	5
Social Democratic Party of Finland	SDP	18,577	33.74%	4
United Finnish Parties (Finnish Party, Young Finnish Party and People's Party)	SP-NP-KP	15,644	28.41%	4
Write-in lists		83	0.15%	0
Valid votes		55,065	100.00%	13
Rejected votes		201	0.36%	
Total polled		55,266	67.33%	
Registered electors		82,078		

The following candidates were elected: Kustaa Ahmala (SDP); Kusti Arffman (ML); Santeri Haapanen (ML); Juho Heikkinen (ML); Matti Hoikka (SDP); Kyösti Kallio (ML); Kalle Korhonen (SDP); Arthur Lagerlöf (SP-NP-KP); Ivar Lantto (ML); Hugo Linna (SP-NP-KP); Yrjö Mäkelin (SDP); Kaarlo Juho Ståhlberg (SP-NP-KP); and Leonard Typpö (SP-NP-KP).

===== 1916 =====
Results of the 1916 parliamentary election held on 1 and 3 July 1916:

Party		Votes	%	Seats
Agrarian Party	ML	15,047	36.02%	5
Social Democratic Party of Finland	SDP	14,149	33.87%	5
Finnish Party	SP	8,127	19.46%	2
Young Finnish Party	NP	4,405	10.55%	1
Write-in lists		42	0.10%	0
Valid votes		41,770	100.00%	13
Rejected votes		276	0.66%	
Total polled		42,046	50.42%	
Registered electors		83,399		

The following candidates were elected: Jalmari Haapanen (ML); Santeri Haapanen (ML); Kalle Hautala (SDP); Matti Hoikka (SDP); Kyösti Kallio (ML); Yrjö Komu (SDP); Kalle Korhonen (SDP); Ivar Lantto (ML); Yrjö Mäkelin (SDP); Filip Saalasti (ML); Aale Sariola (SP); Kaarlo Juho Ståhlberg (NP); and Leonard Typpö (SP).

===== 1913 =====
Results of the 1913 parliamentary election held on 1 and 2 August 1913:

Party		Votes	%	Seats
Agrarian Party	ML	13,274	36.82%	5
Social Democratic Party of Finland	SDP	10,993	30.49%	4
Finnish Party	SP	7,976	22.12%	3
Young Finnish Party	NP	3,764	10.44%	1
Write-in lists		45	0.12%	0
Valid votes		36,052	100.00%	13
Rejected votes		217	0.60%	
Total polled		36,269	43.24%	
Registered electors		83,878		

The following candidates were elected: Heikki Ahmala (SDP); Kalle Jäykkä (ML); Kyösti Kallio (ML); Juho Komu (SDP); J. A. Mannermaa (SP); Yrjö Mäkelin (SDP); Oskari Partanen (ML); Salomo Pulkkinen (ML); Filip Saalasti (ML); Kaarlo Juho Ståhlberg (NP); Heikki Törmä (SDP); Leonard Typpö (SP); and Iisakki Vahe (SP).

===== 1911 =====
Results of the 1911 parliamentary election held on 2 and 3 January 1911:

Party		Votes	%	Seats
Agrarian Party	ML	15,058	36.44%	5
Social Democratic Party of Finland	SDP	11,838	28.65%	4
Finnish Party	SP	10,233	24.76%	3
Young Finnish Party	NP	4,158	10.06%	1
Write-in lists		39	0.09%	0
Valid votes		41,326	100.00%	13
Rejected votes		174	0.42%	
Total polled		41,500	53.21%	
Registered electors		77,999		

The following candidates were elected: Arthur Castrén (NP); Matti Hoikka (SDP); Kyösti Kallio (ML); Otto Karhi (ML); Juho Komu (SDP); Antero Leinola (ML); J. A. Mannermaa (SP); Salomo Pulkkinen (ML); Filip Saalasti (ML); Samuli Tervo (SDP); Heikki Törmä (SDP); Leonard Typpö (SP); and Iisakki Vahe (SP).

===== 1910 =====
Results of the 1910 parliamentary election held on 1 and 2 February 1910:

Party		Votes	%	Seats
Agrarian Party	ML	14,123	36.82%	5
Social Democratic Party of Finland	SDP	10,661	27.80%	4
Finnish Party	SP	9,277	24.19%	3
Young Finnish Party	NP	4,261	11.11%	1
Write-in lists		32	0.08%	0
Valid votes		38,354	100.00%	13
Rejected votes		267	0.69%	
Total polled		38,621	50.38%	
Registered electors		76,657		

The following candidates were elected: Arthur Castrén (NP); Matti Hoikka (SDP); Kyösti Kallio (ML); Otto Karhi (ML); Juho Komu (SDP); Antero Leinola (ML); J. A. Mannermaa (SP); Salomo Pulkkinen (ML); Filip Saalasti (ML); Samuli Tervo (SDP); Heikki Törmä (SDP); Leonard Typpö (SP); and Iisakki Vahe (SP).

==== 1900s ====
===== 1909 =====
Results of the 1909 parliamentary election held on 1 and 3 May 1909:

Party		Votes	%	Seats
Agrarian Party	ML	15,248	35.51%	5
Social Democratic Party of Finland	SDP	11,846	27.59%	4
Finnish Party	SP	10,942	25.48%	3
Young Finnish Party	NP	4,842	11.28%	1
Others		58	0.14%	0
Valid votes		42,936	100.00%	13
Rejected votes		336	0.78%	
Total polled		43,272	56.97%	
Registered electors		75,950		

The following candidates were elected: Arthur Castrén (NP); Santeri Haapanen (SP); Juho Heikkinen (ML); Matti Hoikka (SDP); Kyösti Kallio (ML); Otto Karhi (ML); Juho Komu (SDP); Arthur Lagerlöf (SP); Artturi Laitinen (ML); Antero Leinola (ML); Yrjö Mäkelin (SDP); Kalle Myllylä (SP); and Heikki Törmä (SDP).

===== 1908 =====
Results of the 1908 parliamentary election held on 1 and 2 July 1908:

Party		Votes	%	Seats
Agrarian Party	ML	12,468	31.20%	4
Finnish Party	SP	11,320	28.33%	4
Social Democratic Party of Finland	SDP	10,419	26.07%	4
Young Finnish Party	NP	4,919	12.31%	1
Christian Workers' Union of Finland	KrTL	774	1.94%	0
Others		58	0.15%	0
Valid votes		39,958	100.00%	13
Rejected votes		501	1.24%	
Total polled		40,459	54.54%	
Registered electors		74,177		

The following candidates were elected: Anna Ängeslevä (ML); Juho Heikkinen (ML); Matti Hoikka (SDP); Kyösti Kallio (ML); Juho Komu (SDP); Arthur Lagerlöf (SP); Ivar Lantto (ML); Yrjö Mäkelin (SDP); Kalle Myllylä (SP); Jaakko Piirainen (SDP); Mauno Rosendal (NP); Antti Tuomikoski (SP); and Iisakki Vahe (SP).

===== 1907 =====
Results of the 1907 parliamentary election held on 15 and 16 March 1907:

Party		Votes	%	Seats
Finnish Party	SP	14,405	31.04%	4
Agrarian Party	ML	13,569	29.24%	4
Social Democratic Party of Finland	SDP	11,557	24.90%	3
Young Finnish Party	NP	6,229	13.42%	2
Swedish People's Party of Finland	SFP	481	1.04%	0
Others		167	0.36%	0
Valid votes		46,408	100.00%	13
Rejected votes		583	1.24%	
Total polled		46,991	62.94%	
Registered electors		74,656		

The following candidates were elected: Juho Heikkinen (ML); Matti Hoikka (SDP); Kalle Hämäläinen (SDP); Kyösti Kallio (ML); Otto Karhi (ML); Heikki Kiiskinen (ML); Mikko Knuutila (NP); Juho Komu (SDP); Arthur Lagerlöf (SP); Albert Luoma (NP); Kalle Myllylä (SP); Aate Olkkonen (SP); and Iisakki Vahe (SP).
