= Meriläinen =

Surname list

Meriläinen is the surname of the following people

- Antti Meriläinen (1887–1942), Finnish politician
- Matti Meriläinen (1889–1963), Finnish politician
- Mikko Meriläinen (1927–2015), Finnish skier
- Pekka Meriläinen (1886–1926), Finnish politician
- Rosa Meriläinen (born 1975), Finnish politician
- Usko Meriläinen (1930–2004), Finnish composer
