= Ville Tikkanen =

Ville Tikkanen may refer to:

- Ville Tikkanen (footballer) (born 1999), Finnish footballer
- Ville Tikkanen (politician) (1919–2013), Finnish politician
