= Myllylä =

Myllylä is a Finnish surname.

== Geographical distribution ==
As of 2014, 94.9% of all known bearers of the surname Myllylä were residents of Finland (frequency 1:3,404), 3.6% of Sweden (1:158,819) and 1.1% of Estonia (1:69,562). In Finland, the frequency of the surname was higher than national average (1:3,404) in North Ostrobothnia (1:687), Kymenlaakso (1:1,597), Central Ostrobothnia (1:2,388), Päijänne Tavastia (1:2,437), Central Finland (1:2,550), and Kainuu (1:3,258).

== People ==
- Kalle Myllylä (1844–1923), Finnish farmer and politician
- Mika Myllylä (1969–2011), Finnish cross-country skier
- Seppo Myllylä (born 1958), Finnish judoka
