= Pekka Raudaskoski =

Finnish physician (1928–2026)

- Born: Pekka Leander Raudaskoski; 2 April 1928; Ylivieska, Finland
- Died: 25 July 2026 (aged 98); Rovaniemi, Finland
- Education: University of Helsinki; University of Turku
- Occupations: Physician, politician
- Known for: Chief Rehabilitation Physician at Lapland Central Hospital
- Children: 7
- Relatives: Vappu Säilynoja (sister)

Pekka Raudaskoski (2 April 1928 – 25 July 2026) was a Finnish physician and politician. He served as the Chief Rehabilitation Physician at Lapland Central Hospital in Rovaniemi. Raudaskoski was also the Rovaniemi City Council, representing the Finnish People's Democratic League and later the Left Alliance. He also served as a presidential elector in the 1978 presidential election.

== Early life and career ==
Pekka Leander Raudaskoski was born in Raudaskylä, Ylivieska on 2 April 1928. He had six siblings, one of them is Vappu Säilynoja, who is a famous politician. His mother served as a member of the Nivala Municipal Council. During the Great Depression in 1930, his family lost their home in a forced auction. He became motivated after living in a rural town filled with diseases. He studied in Helsinki before transferring to the University of Turku, where he graduated as a physician in 1957.

After graduating, Raudaskoski moved to Lapland as a substitute doctor. After completing specialized training in internal medicine in Joensuu and Helsinki, he returned to Lapland Central Hospital. He treated pregnant women suffering from the medical complications of illegal abortions, and he later served for many years as the hospital's chief rehabilitation physician.

During the COVID-19 pandemic, Raudaskoski criticised anti-vaccination views. In early 2026, a social media post he wrote went viral, opposing cuts to healthcare and social security made by the Orpo Cabinet. He represented the Finnish People's Democratic League and later the Left Alliance, he served for many years on the Rovaniemi City Council and was a presidential elector in 1978. He was close friends with Reidar Särestöniemi and Timo K. Mukka.

== Death ==
Raudaskoski died in Rovaniemi on 25 July 2026, at the age of 98.
