= Paaso =

Paaso is a Finnish surname.

== Geographical distribution ==
As of 2014, 79.2% of all known bearers of the surname Paaso were residents of Finland (frequency 1:7,093), 10.4% of Sweden (1:96,537) and 8.5% of the United States (1:4,352,425).

In Finland, the frequency of the surname was higher than national average (1:7,093) in the following regions:

1. North Ostrobothnia (1:965)
2. Lapland (1:2,113)

== People ==
- Hannes Paaso (1908–1970), Finnish farmer, lay preacher and politician
