= Mikko Kinnunen =

Finnish politician

Member of the Finnish Parliament for Oulu

Personal details
- Born: 16 July 1967 (age 58) Merijärvi, North Ostrobothnia, Finland
- Party: Centre Party

Mikko Pekka Johannes Kinnunen (born 16 July 1967 in Merijärvi) is a Finnish politician currently serving in the Parliament of Finland for the Centre Party at the Oulu constituency.
