= Jenna Simula =

Finnish politician

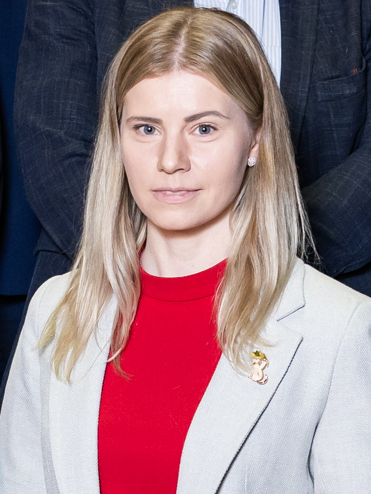
- Simula in 2023.

Member of the Finnish Parliament for Oulu
- Incumbent
- Assumed office 17 April 2019

Personal details
- Born: 13 September 1989 (age 36) Oulu, North Ostrobothnia, Finland
- Party: Finns Party

Jenna Simula (born 13 September 1989 in Oulu) is a Finnish politician currently serving in the Parliament of Finland for the Finns Party at the Oulu constituency.
