= Jenni Pitko =

Finnish politician (born 1986)

Member of the Finnish Parliament for Oulu
- Incumbent
- Assumed office 17 April 2019

Personal details
- Born: 15 August 1986 (age 40) Kemi, Lapland, Finland
- Party: Green League
- Education: University of Oulu
- Profession: Architect
- Website: https://jennipitko.fi/koti/

Jenni Pitko (born 15 August 1986 in Kemi) is a Finnish politician currently serving in the Parliament of Finland for the Green League at the Oulu constituency. She was first elected to parliament in 2019. Previously, she served on the Oulu city council. Prior to becoming a politician Pitko studied at the University of Oulu and worked as an architect.
