= Hanna-Leena Mattila =

Finnish politician

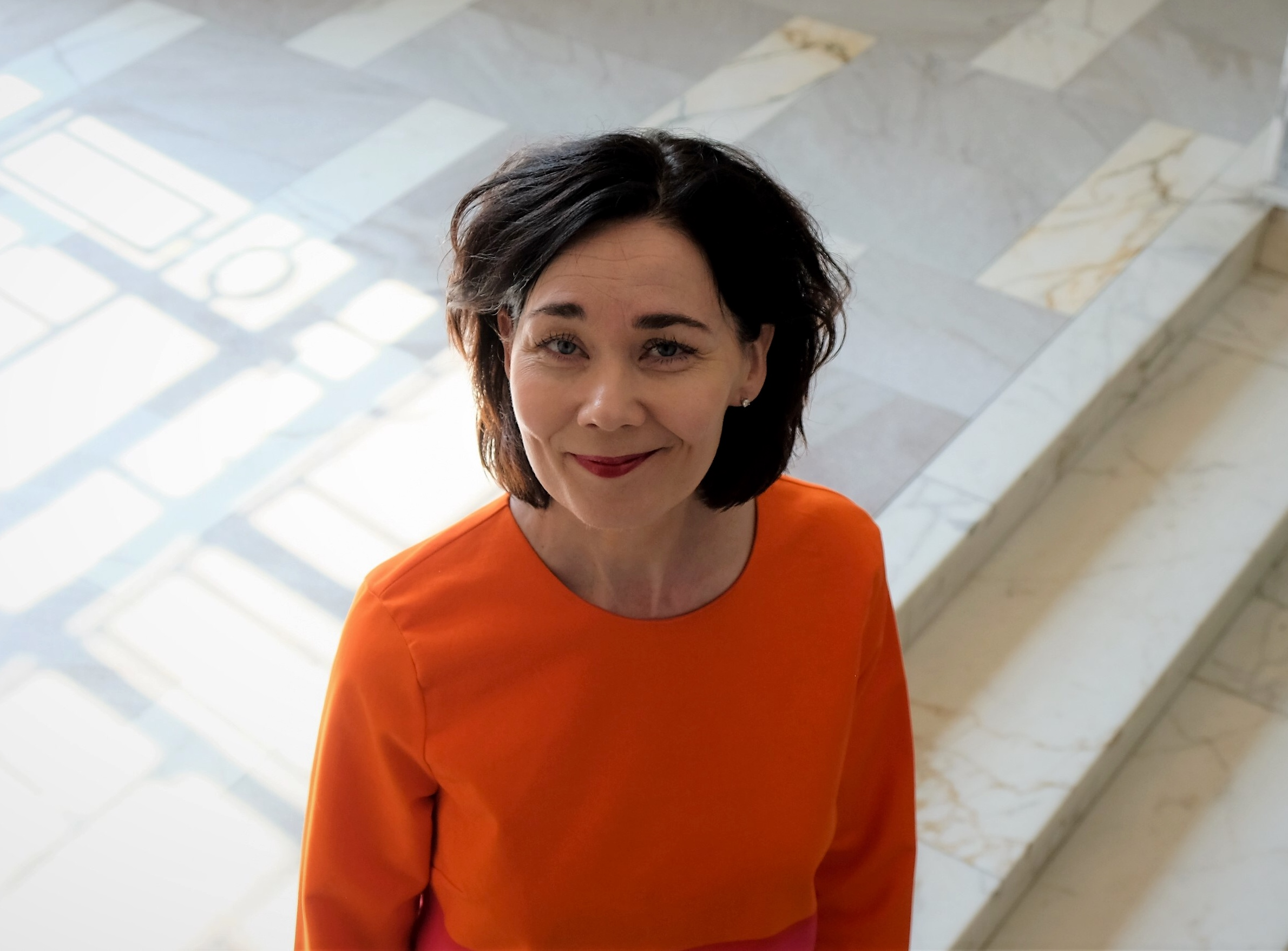

Member of the Finnish Parliament for Oulu
- Incumbent
- Assumed office 28 June 2018

Personal details
- Born: 1 September 1968 (age 58) Haukipudas, Finland
- Party: Centre Party
- Education: University of Oulu

Hanna-Leena Mattila (born 1 September 1968) is a Finnish politician currently serving in the Parliament of Finland for the Centre Party at the Oulu constituency.
