= Pia Hiltunen =

Finnish politician

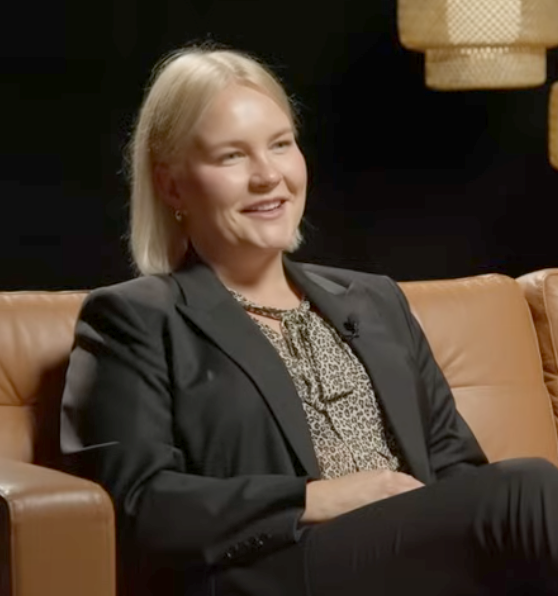
- In a 2024 interview with Verkkouutiset

Member of the Parliament of Finland
- Incumbent
- Assumed office 14 September 2023
- Constituency: Oulu

Personal details
- Born: 1991 (age 34–35) Oulu, Finland
- Citizenship: Finland
- Party: SDP
- Education: University of Oulu

Pia Hiltunen (born 1991) is a Finnish politician. Hiltunen was elected as a Member of Parliament for the Social Democratic Party (SDP) from the Oulu constituency in the 2023 Finnish parliamentary election. She is a member of the Education and Legal Affairs Committee and a deputy member of the Environment Committee in the Parliament. Hiltunen also serves as a city councillor for Oulu.

== Biography ==
=== Studies ===
Hiltunen holds a Master of Education (M.Ed.). Hiltunen studied her degree at the University of Oulu, in the arts and crafts-focused classroom teacher training program. In addition, Hiltunen has specialized in educational administration, pre-school and elementary education, health education, physical education, and special education.

=== Career ===
Before being elected as a Member of Parliament, Hiltunen worked as a classroom teacher in Oulu. In addition, Hiltunen has worked in Otava in marketing and development of educational materials. Hiltunen also has work experience in customer service and physical education.

=== Leisure ===
As a young woman, Hiltunen has participated in a variety of sports. Her hobbies have included team gymnastics, artistic gymnastics, artistic swimming, competitive cheerleading and dance. Hiltunen has danced at the Finnish Championship and World Championship level. Hiltunen has studied physical education classes during her primary school years. Physical education and art hobbies are still part of her everyday life.

== See also ==
- List of members of the Parliament of Finland, 2023–2027
