= Olga Oinas-Panuma =

Finnish politician (born 1999)

Member of the Parliament of Finland
- Incumbent
- Assumed office 5 April 2023
- Constituency: Oulu

Personal details
- Born: 1999 (age 26–27)
- Party: Centre Party

Olga Oinas-Panuma (born 1999) is a Finnish politician serving as a member of the Parliament of Finland since 2023. She is the youngest current member of parliament.
