= Tuomas Kettunen =

Finnish politician (born 1988)

Member of the Finnish Parliament for Oulu
- Incumbent
- Assumed office 28 November 2019

Personal details
- Born: 9 January 1988 (age 38)
- Party: Centre Party

Tuomas Ilari Kettunen (born 9 January 1988) is a Finnish politician currently serving in the Parliament of Finland for the Centre Party at the Oulu constituency.
