= Riitta Jouppila =

Finnish politician (born 1940)

Riitta Jouppila (née Liukko; born 30 May 1940, Kuopio) is a Finnish physician and politician.

Jouppila qualified as a physician in 1966, and went on to specialise in anesthesiology, eventually obtaining a doctorate in medicine and surgery in 1977 from the University of Oulu; her Doctoral thesis was titled The Effect of segmental epidural analgesia on hormonal and metabolic changes during labour.

Alongside her duties as a medical practitioner and professor, Jouppila served in various elected positions, including as a member of Oulu City Council from 1981 to 1995.

In 1983, Jouppila was elected to Parliament from the Oulu constituency, representing the National Coalition Party, and serving for three terms until 1995.

She also served as an inaugural Finnish Member of European Parliament upon Finland's accession to the EU, from January 1995 until November 1996.

In 1998, Jouppila was granted the honorary title of Professori.
