= Janne Heikkinen (politician) =

Finnish politician

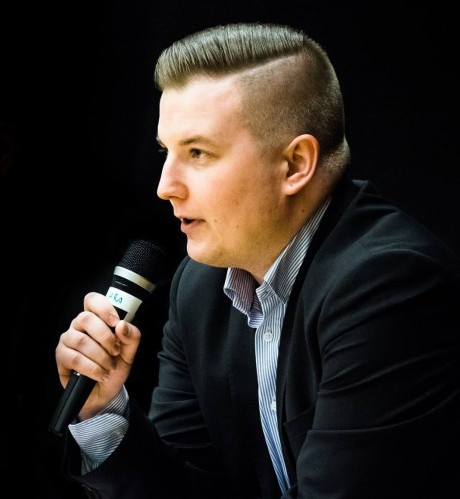

Member of Parliament
- Incumbent
- Assumed office 17 April 2019

Member of the Finnish Parliament for Oulu

Personal details
- Born: Janne Artturi Heikkinen; 16 May 1990 (age 36) Oulu, North Ostrobothnia, Finland
- Party: National Coalition Party
- Education: University of Jyväskylä
- Website: Official website

Janne Artturi Heikkinen (born May 16, 1990 in Oulu) is a Finnish politician and a member of the Parliament of Finland (MP). He got elected with 4124 personal votes from Oulu.

Heikkinen joined the National Coalition Party in 2008 and was first elected to the Kempele City Council in the 2008 Finnish municipal elections and to the Parliament of Finland in 2019 Finnish parliamentary election. In 2019 he received a Master's degree from the University of Jyväskylä.

== In Parliament ==
Heikkinen is member in the Parliamentary Transport and Communications Committee and Agriculture and Forestry Committee.
