= Raimo Piirainen =

Finnish politician

Member of the Finnish Parliament for Oulu
- Incumbent
- Assumed office 17 April 2019
- In office 20 July 2009 – 21 April 2015

Personal details
- Born: 22 December 1952 (age 73) Kajaani, Kainuu, Finland
- Party: Social Democratic Party of Finland

Raimo Olavi Piirainen (born 22 December 1952 in Kajaani) is a Finnish politician currently serving in the Parliament of Finland for the Social Democratic Party of Finland at the Oulu constituency. He first entered parliament in 2009 to replace Liisa Jaakonsaari, who had been elected as a Member of European Parliament. He lost his seat at the 2015 Finnish parliamentary election, and was re-elected to his Oulu parliamentary seat in 2019.
