= Ville Vähämäki =

Finnish politician

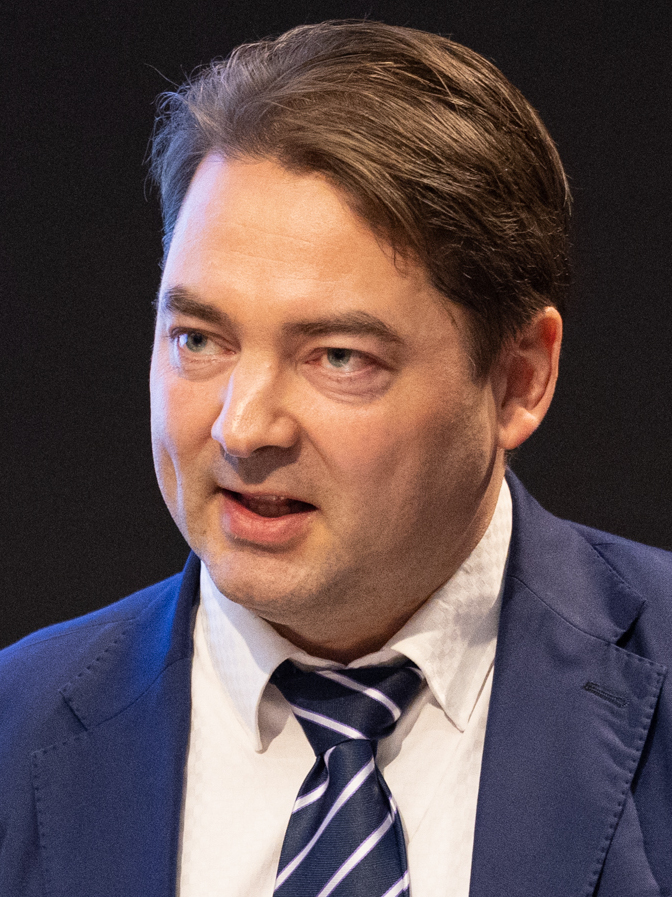

Member of the Finnish Parliament
- Incumbent
- Assumed office 20 April 2011

Personal details
- Born: 30 March 1979 (age 46) Veteli, Finland
- Party: Finns Party

Ville Petteri Vähämäki (born March 30, 1979) is a Finnish politician, representing the Finns Party in the Parliament of Finland since 2011. He represents the Oulu constituency.
