= Rautio =

- Former municipality
- Raution kunta
- Coat of arms

- Location of Rautio in Finland
- Coordinates: 64.0746882°N 24.2083288°E
- Country: Finland
- Province: Oulu Province
- Region: Northern Ostrobothnia
- Established: 1912
- Merged into Kalajoki: 1973
- Seat: Rautio

Area
  - Land: 190.5 km^{2} (73.6 sq mi)

Population (1972-12-31)
  - Total: 1,348

Rautio is a former municipality, now a part of Kalajoki, Finland. It was consolidated to Kalajoki in 1973.

== History ==
The name Rautio comes from a word meaning "blacksmith". Rautio has existed at least since 1547, at the time it only had three farms. It was a part of the Kalajoki parish.

Rautio became a chapel community in 1826. In 1912, it became a separate parish and municipality.

Rautio was merged back into Kalajoki in 1973.

== People born in Rautio ==
- Leonard Typpö (1868 – 1922)
- Elias Simojoki (1899 – 1940)
