= Risto Kalliorinne =

Finnish politician

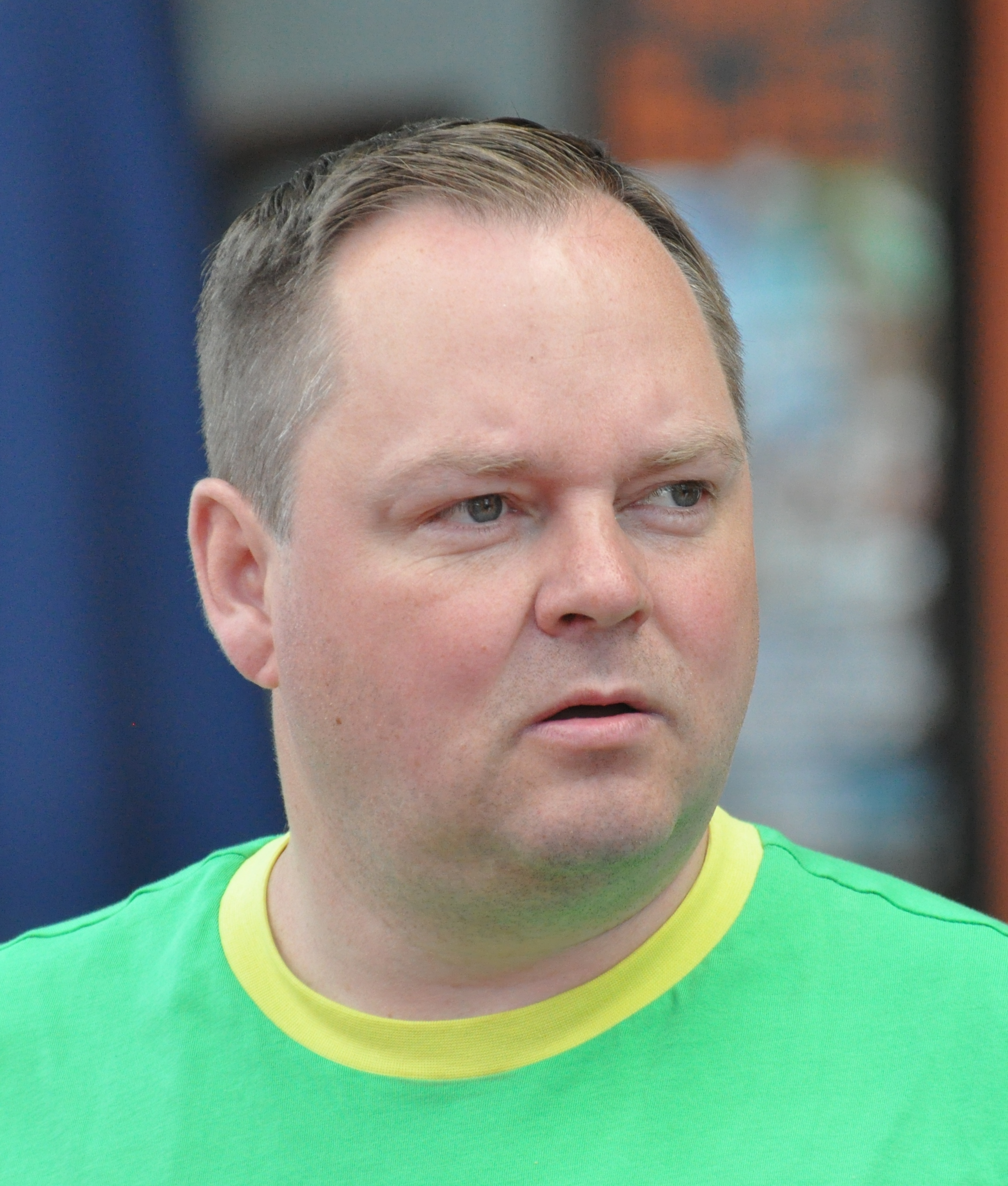

Member of the Finnish Parliament for Oulu

Personal details
- Born: 11 October 1971 (age 54) Raahe, North Ostrobothnia, Finland
- Party: Left Alliance

Risto Olavi Kalliorinne (born 11 October 1971 in Raahe) is a Finnish politician currently serving in the Parliament of Finland for the Left Alliance at the Oulu constituency.
