= Juha Pylväs =

Finnish politician (born 1971)

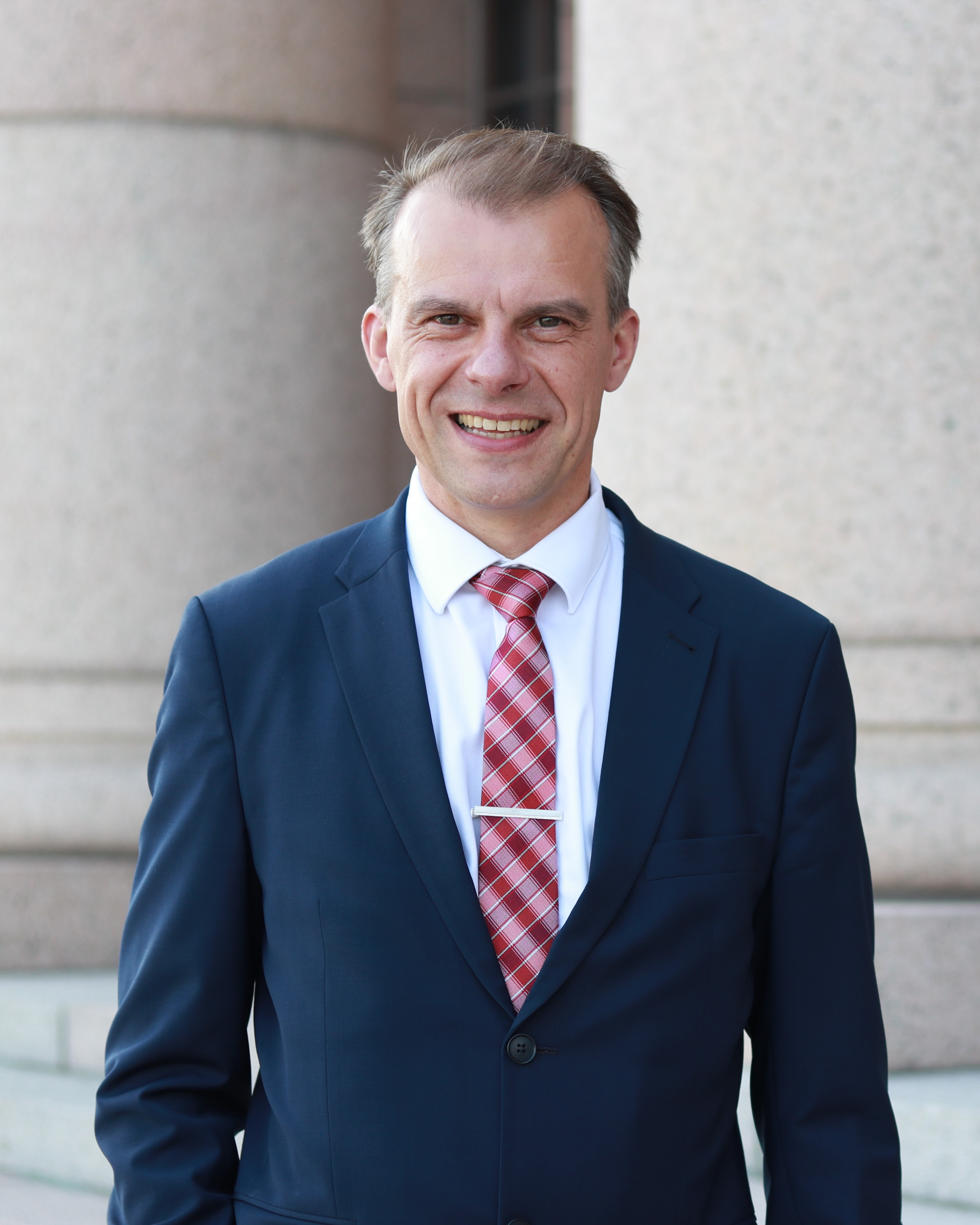

Member of the Finnish Parliament for Oulu

Personal details
- Born: 24 March 1971 (age 55)
- Party: Centre Party

Juha Pylväs (born 24 March 1971) is a Finnish politician currently serving in the Parliament of Finland for the Centre Party at the Oulu constituency. He is the current chair of the parliamentary group of the Centre Party.
