= Kalevi Mattila =

Finnish politician (1934–2022)

Member of the Parliament of Finland
- In office 27 September 1975 – 23 March 1995
- Constituency: Oulu

Personal details
- Born: Kalevi Kustaa Mattila; 11 November 1934 Ylivieska, Finland
- Died: 5 November 2022 (aged 87) Ylivieska, Finland
- Party: KESK

Kalevi Kustaa Mattila (11 November 1934 – 5 November 2022) was a Finnish politician. A member of the Centre Party, he served in the Parliament of Finland from 1975 to 1995. He died in Ylivieska at the age of 87.
