= Pekka Aittakumpu =

Finnish politician

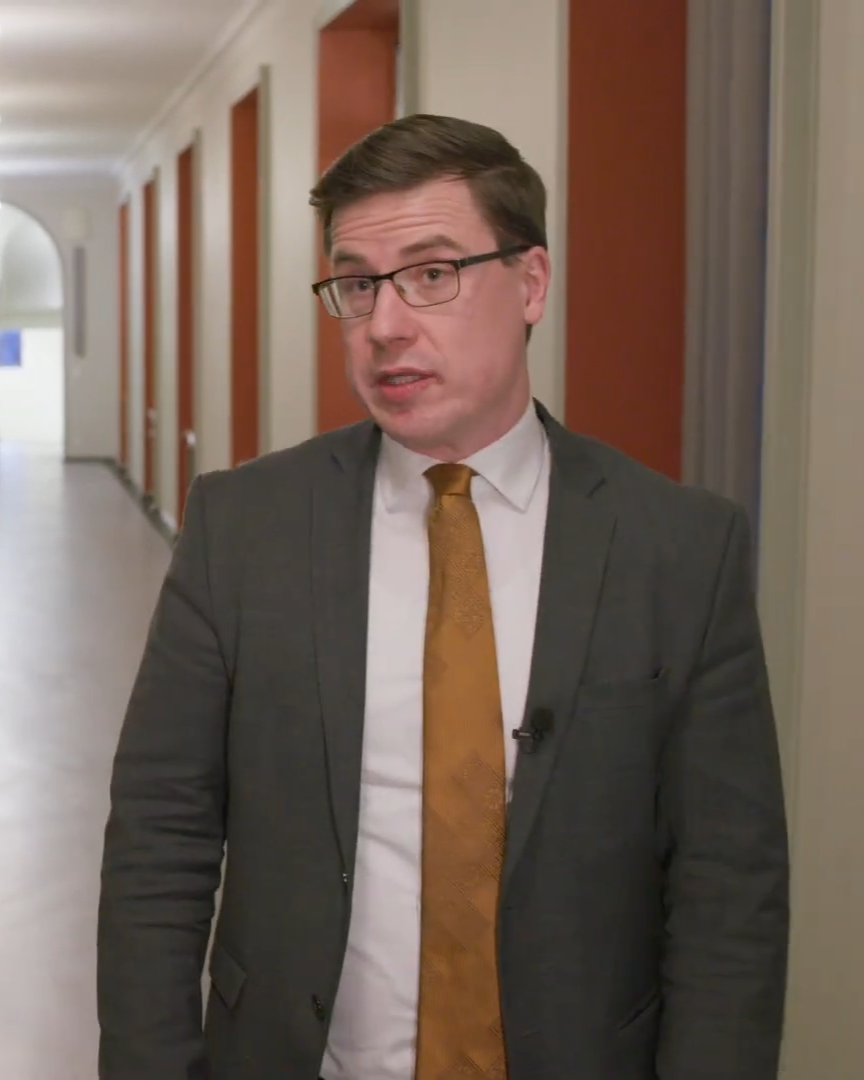

Member of the Finnish Parliament for Oulu
- Incumbent
- Assumed office 17 April 2019

Personal details
- Born: 30 June 1981 (age 45) Oulu, North Ostrobothnia, Finland
- Party: Finns Party (2024–); Centre Party (until 2024)
- Spouse: Tiina Aittakumpu
- Children: 8
- Education: University of Oulu University of Eastern Finland

Pekka Juhani Aittakumpu (born 1981 in Oulu) is a Finnish Lutheran priest and politician currently serving in the Parliament of Finland for the Finns Party at the Oulu constituency. He represented the Centre Party from 2019 until October 2024 when he defected to the Finns Party. He cited numerous ideological differences between himself and the Centre Party, such as the stance on Yle, the Finnish branch of the Extinction Rebellion movement "Elokapina", LGBT issues and Finnish language and culture.
