= Hugo Linna =

Finnish agronomist and politician (1873–1921)

Hugo Immanuel Linna (14 September 1873 – 4 February 1921; original surname Castrén) was a Finnish agronomist and politician, born in Hyrynsalmi. He was a member of the Parliament of Finland from 1917 to 1919, representing the Young Finnish Party until 9 December 1918 and the National Progressive Party after that.
