= Leonard Typpö =

Finnish politician

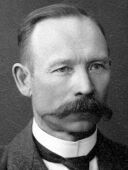
- Born: 29 January 1868; Rautio, Finland
- Died: 27 June 1922 (aged 54)
- Occupations: farmer, lay preacher, politician
- Years active: 1911–1922
- Known for: member, Parliament of Finland
- Political party: Finnish Party (1911–1918); National Coalition Party (1918–1922)

Leonard Typpö (29 January 1868 – 27 June 1922) was a Finnish farmer and lay preacher. He was born in Rautio. He was a member of the Parliament of Finland from 1911 until his death in 1922. Typpö represented the Finnish Party from 1911 to 1918 and the National Coalition Party from 1918 to 1922.
