= Heikki Mustonen =

Finnish farmer and politician (1922–1993)

Heikki August (Aukusti) Mustonen (30 April 1922 – 18 December 1993) was a Finnish farmer and politician, born in Sotkamo. He was a member of the Parliament of Finland from 1966 to 1979, from March to December 1983 and from 1985 to 1987, representing the Finnish People's Democratic League (SKDL). He was a presidential elector in the 1968, 1978 and 1982 presidential elections.
