= Emil Jatkola =

Finnish jurist and politician (1879–1948)

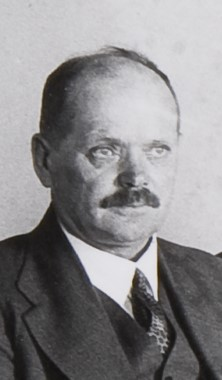
Emil Jatkola in 1933

Emil Julius (E. J.) Jatkola (13 October 1879 – 31 December 1948) was a Finnish jurist and politician, born in Pyhäjärvi. He was a member of the Parliament of Finland from 1930 to 1933, representing the National Progressive Party. He served as Minister of Justice from 6 March to 7 October 1936. He was the governor of Mikkeli Province from 1933 until his death in 1948. He was a presidential elector in the 1925 Finnish presidential election.
