= Antti Koukkari =

Finnish Lutheran pastor and politician (1914–1958)

Antti Anselmi Koukkari (21 April 1914 – 18 February 1958) was a Finnish Lutheran pastor and politician, born in Oulu. He was a member of the Parliament of Finland from 1945 to 1949, representing the Agrarian League. He was a presidential elector in the 1950 and 1956 presidential elections.
