= Kalle Jäykkä =

Finnish politician

Kalle Vihtori Jäykkä (17 August 1869 – 8 November 1951) was a Finnish farmer and politician. He was born in Vampula, and was a Member of the Parliament of Finland from 1913 to 1916, representing the Agrarian League.
