= Unto Valpas =

Finnish politician (1944–2016)

Unto Olavi Valpas (October 4, 1944 – September 13, 2016) was a Finnish politician and member of Finnish Parliament, representing the Left Alliance. He was elected to the Finnish Parliament in 1999.
