= Alvar Saukko =

Finnish politician (1929–2007)

Alvar Johannes Saukko (28 November 1929, Merijärvi – 6 January 2007) was a Finnish civil servant and politician. He was a member of the Parliament of Finland from 1975 to 1983, representing the Centre Party.
