= Heikki Kannisto =

Finnish jurist and politician (1898–1957)

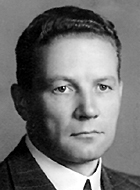
Heikki Kannisto

Heikki Albert Kannisto (19 January 1898 – 19 February 1957; name until 1906 Henrik Albert Candelin) was a Finnish jurist and politician, born in Oulu. He was a member of the Parliament of Finland from 1936 to 1939 and from 1945 to 1952, representing the National Progressive Party until 1951 and the People's Party of Finland after that. He served as Minister of Justice from 17 March 1950 to 17 January 1950 and Minister of the Interior from 17 November 1953 to 5 May 1954. Kannisto was the chairman of the National Progressive Party from 1949 to 1951. He was a presidential elector in the 1950 Finnish presidential election.
