= Heikki Törmä =

Finnish shoemaker and politician (1875–1945)

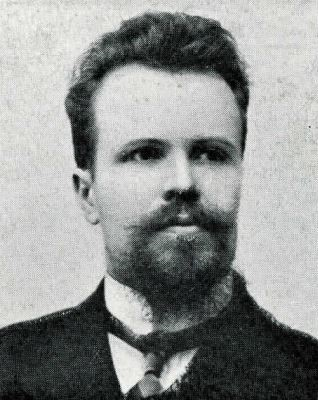
Heikki Törmä in 1909

Heikki Törmä (27 October 1875 – 22 July 1945) was a Finnish shoemaker and politician, born in Haapavesi. He was a member of the Parliament of Finland from 1909 to 1916 and from 1919 to 1922, representing the Social Democratic Party of Finland (SDP).
