= Kalle Hautala =

Finnish house painter, journalist and politician (1888–1956)

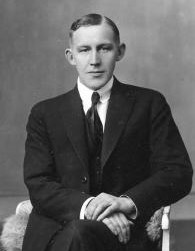
Kalle Hautala

Kaarle (Kalle) Hautala (24 March 1888 – 17 March 1956) was a Finnish house painter, journalist and politician, born in Toholampi. He was a member of the Parliament of Finland from 1916 to 1917, representing the Social Democratic Party of Finland (SDP). During the Finnish Civil War of 1918, he sided with the Reds. After the defeat of the Red side, Hautala went into exile in Sweden. He returned to Finland in 1922.
