= Arvi Turkka =

Finnish journalist and politician

Arvi Turkka (2 October 1894 – 28 January 1965) was a Finnish journalist and politician, born in Oulu. He was a member of the Parliament of Finland from 1933 to 1945 and again from 1948 to 1962, representing first the Social Democratic Party of Finland (SDP), later the Social Democratic Union of Workers and Smallholders (TPSL). He was a member of the peace opposition during the Continuation War.
