= Jaakko Kemppainen =

Finnish jurist, bank director and politician (1904–1988)

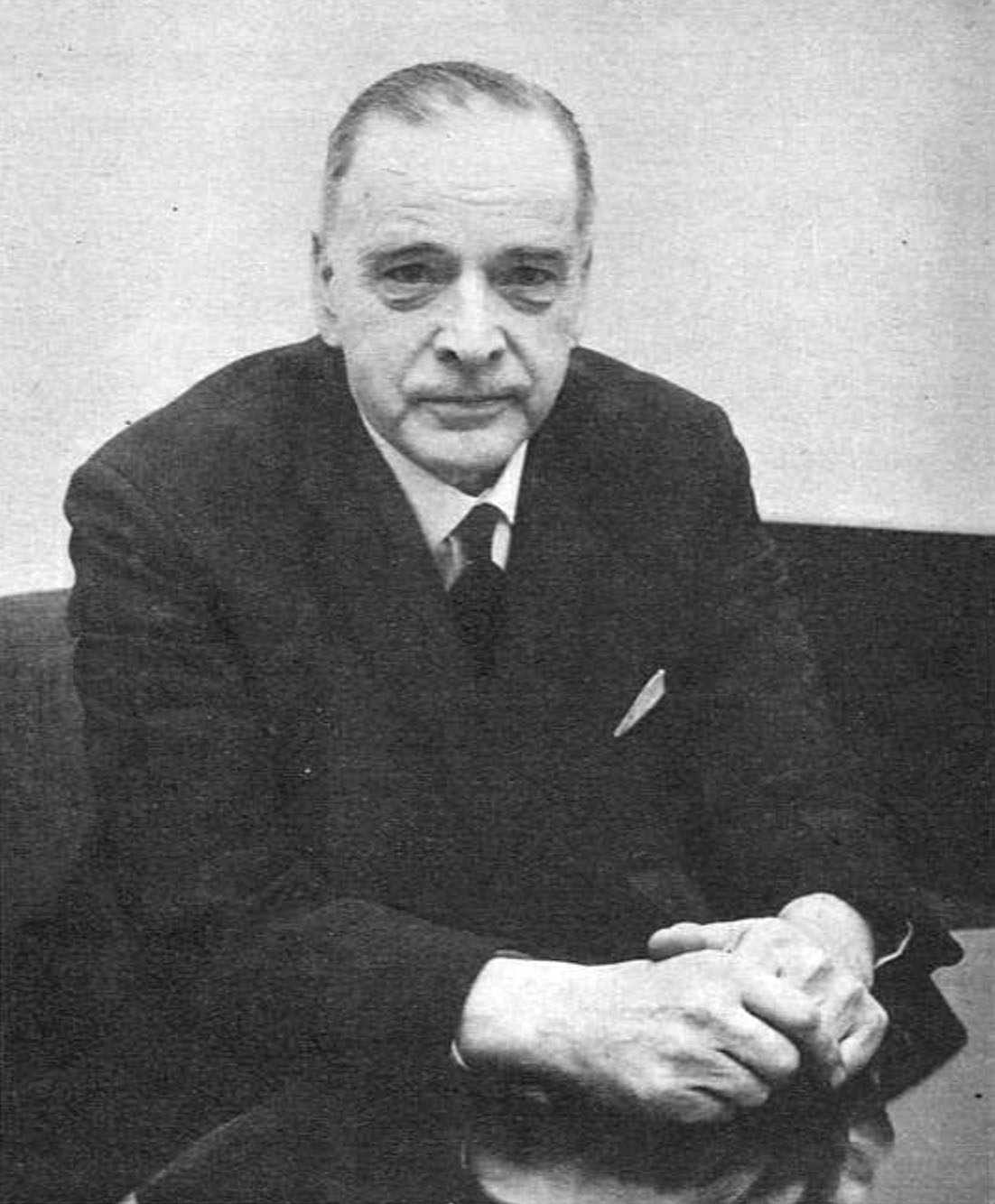
Jaakko Kemppainen in 1966

Jaakko Abram Kemppainen (26 November 1904 – 11 February 1988) was a Finnish jurist, bank director and politician, born in Oulu. He began his political career in the Patriotic People's Movement (IKL). Kemppainen was a member of the Parliament of Finland from 1958 to 1970, representing the National Coalition Party. He was a presidential elector in the 1962 and 1968 presidential elections.
