= Antti Kinnunen =

Finnish politician

Anders (Antti) August Kinnunen (19 May 1903 – 16 January 1979) was a Finnish farmer and politician, born in Saloinen. He was a member of the Parliament of Finland from 1951 to 1958 and again from 1962 to 1970, representing the Finnish People's Democratic League (SKDL).
