= Armas Leinonen =

Finnish politician

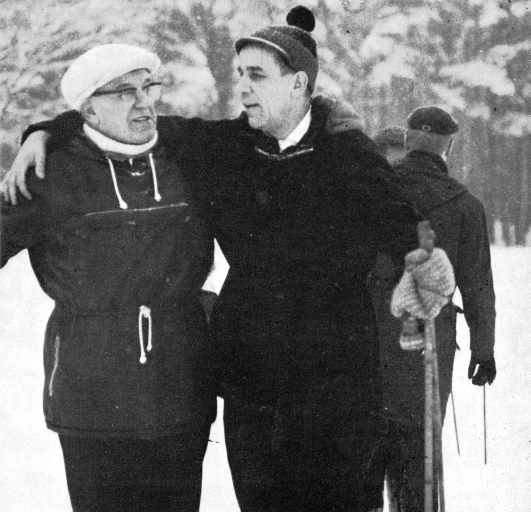
Members of Parliament Armas Leinonen (left) and Mikko Juva after a skiing competition, 1965.

Armas Leinonen (28 December 1900 – 29 May 1985) was a Finnish schoolteacher and politician, born in Oulu. He was a member of the Parliament of Finland, representing the People's Party of Finland from 1952 to 1965 and the Liberal People's Party from 1965 to 1970.
