= Sakari Ainali =

Finnish politician

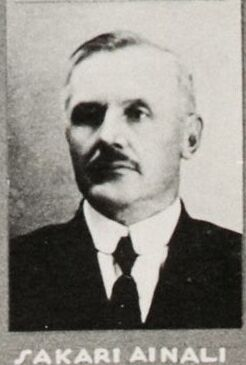

Sakari Ainali (3 December 1874 - 31 October 1938) was a Finnish farmer, businessman, lay preacher and politician, born in Himanka. He was a member of the Parliament of Finland from 1924 to 1929 and from 1930 to 1933, representing the National Coalition Party. In his youth Ainali worked as a miner and foreman at the Homestake Gold Mine in Lead, South Dakota.
