= Martti Korhonen =

Finnish politician

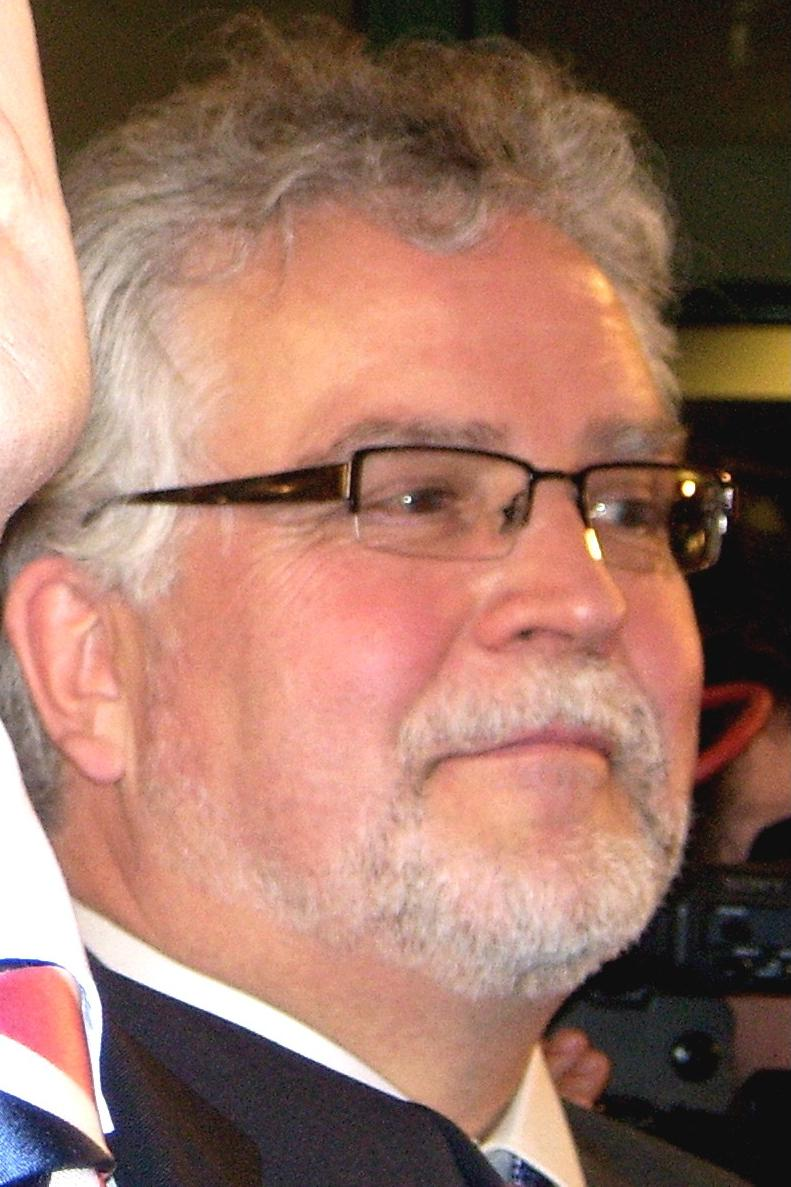
Martti Korhonen

Martti Korhonen (born 27 February 1953 in Oulu) is a Finnish politician and member of Finnish Parliament, representing the Left Alliance. He was first elected to the parliament in 1991 and as the chairperson of his party in 2006. Korhonen served as the Minister of Regional and Municipal affairs under Paavo Lipponen's second Cabinet (1999–2003).
