= Vilho Kivioja =

Finnish politician and cleric (1896–1977)

Vilho Heikki Kivioja (21 January 1896 – 2 November 1977) was a Finnish Lutheran clergyman and politician, born in Kalajoki. He was a member of the Parliament of Finland from 1929 to 1945, representing the Agrarian League. Anna-Maja Henriksson is his granddaughter.
