= Reino Kangas =

Finnish farmer, lay preacher and politician (1910–1998)

Reino Robert Kangas (20 April 1910 – 12 February 1998) was a Finnish farmer, lay preacher and politician, born in Paavola. He was a member of the Parliament of Finland from 1962 to 1975, representing the Agrarian League, which changed its name to Centre Party in 1965. He was a presidential elector in the 1968 Finnish presidential election.
