= Antti Tuomikoski =

Finnish sexton and politician (1842–1932)

Anders (Antti) Tuomikoski (19 July 1842 – 1 May 1932) was a Finnish sexton and politician, born in Pyhäjoki. He was a member of the Diet of Finland in 1885, 1888, 1894, 1897, 1899, in 1900 and from 1904 to 1905 and of the Parliament of Finland from 1908 to 1909, representing the Finnish Party.
