= Yrjö Kesti =

Finnish politician

Yrjö Henrik Kesti (28 June 1885 – 9 October 1960) was a Finnish farmer and politician, born in Oulu. He was a Member of the Parliament of Finland from 1930 to 1936, representing the Small Farmers' Party of Finland.
