= Antero Leinola =

Finnish farmer and politician (1872–1933)

Antti Antero Leinola (18 May 1872 – 20 December 1933) was a Finnish farmer and politician, born in Juva. He was a member of the Parliament of Finland from 1909 to 1913, representing the Agrarian League.
