= Edvard Huttunen =

Finnish trade union leader and politician (1889–1943)

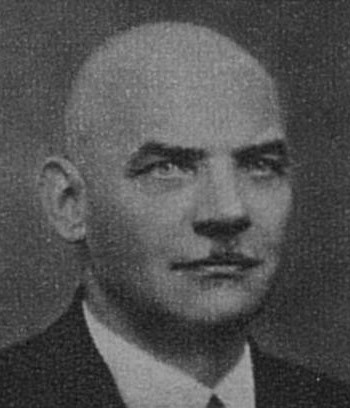

Johan Edvard Huttunen (30 July 1889 – 2 May 1943) was a Finnish trade union leader and politician, born in Viipurin maalaiskunta. He was a member of the Parliament of Finland from 1924 to 1933 and from 1937 to 1939, representing the Socialist Electoral Organisation of Workers and Smallholders until 1926 and the Social Democratic Party of Finland (SDP) after that. Huttunen was the chairman of the Finnish Trade Union Federation (SAJ) from 1923 to 1925 and of the Finnish Federation of Trade Unions (SAK) from 1930 to 1937. He was a presidential elector in the 1931 Finnish presidential election. Huttunen was imprisoned from 1918 to 1920 for having sided with the Reds during the Finnish Civil War of 1918.
