= Toivo Janhonen =

Finnish Lutheran pastor and politician (1886–1939)

Toivo Aapeli Janhonen (2 February 1886 – 3 November 1939) was a Finnish Lutheran pastor and politician, born in Jyväskylä. He was a member of the Parliament of Finland from 1924 until his death in 1939, representing the Agrarian League. He served as Minister of Social Affairs from 7 October 1936 to 12 March 1937. He was a presidential elector in the 1925 and 1937 presidential elections.

When Janhonen was a candidate in the same Oulu electoral district as President Kyösti Kallio, he received more votes than Kallio in some elections.
