= Mauritz Rosenberg =

Finnish politician (1879–1941)

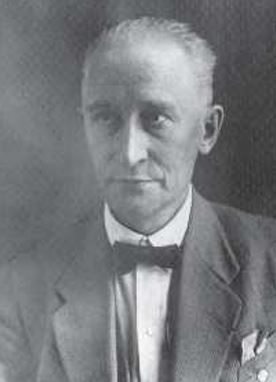
Mauritz Rosenberg

Mauritz Rosenberg (1879–1941) was a Finnish politician who served as vice president and finance minister of the Terijoki government during the Finnish Democratic Republic.

== Biography ==
Rosenberg was born in Turku in 1879. He worked as a locomotive driver and newspaper editor. Rosenberg was a member of the Finnish Communist Party. He was arrested and detained until 1934. Following his release he settled in the Soviet Union.

In the period between 1 December 1939 and 12 March 1940 Rosenberg served as vice president and finance minister in the cabinet, known as Terijoki government, led by Otto Wille Kuusinen. Rosenberg died in 1941.

His son, Gösta Rosenberg, was a member of the Parliament for the Communist Party between 1945 and 1966.
