= Kyösti Karjula =

Finnish politician

Kyösti Juhani Karjula (born May 8, 1952 in Oulu) is a politician and former member of the Finnish Parliament from Lumijoki, representing the Centre Party. He was first elected to parliament in 1995 and remained until 2011.

Karjula has an agricultural agent's education from the University of Helsinki. His military rank is Senior Lieutenant. Karjula is a member of the conservative Lutheran revival movement Laestadianism. He and his wife Eila Marjatta Ylielsilä have 18 children, thirteen sons and five daughters.
