= Heikki Simonen =

Finnish smallholder and politician

Heikki Simonen (22 April 1902 - 16 January 1975) was a Finnish smallholder and politician, born in Alavieska. He was a member of the Parliament of Finland from 1939 to 1951, representing the Social Democratic Party of Finland (SDP).
