= Ilmari Sormunen =

Finnish politician (1896–1980)

Toivo Ilmari Sormunen (23 November 1896, in Sumiainen – 22 November 1980) was a Finnish farmer and politician. He joined the still illegal Communist Party of Finland (SKP) in the 1920s. On 1 May 1930, Sormunen was abducted for a short time by activists of the anti-communist Lapua Movement, as he was about to give a speech at a leftist May Day rally. This was the first in a series of abductions carried out by the Lapua Movement against left-wing activists in 1930. During the 1930s, Sormunen was accused by members of the leadership of the SKP of being a bukharinite and a social democrat for having been critical of collectivisation. Because of his communist activities, Sormunen was imprisoned by Finnish authorities for sedition from 1930 to 1934 and again from 1937 to 1939. The SKP was legalised in 1944 as a result of the Moscow Armistice of 19 September 1944 and in March 1945 Sormunen was elected to the Parliament of Finland, where he represented the Finnish People's Democratic League (SKDL) from 1945 to 1951.
