= Martti Linna =

Finnish politician (1911–2008)

Martti Linna (11 April 1911 – 9 February 2008) was a Finnish farmer and politician, born in Nivala. Initially a member of the Agrarian League, Linna later joined the Finnish People's Democratic League (SKDL), which he represented in the Parliament of Finland from 1958 to 1970.
