= Antti Rantakangas =

Finnish politician (1964–2019)

Antti Rantakangas (February 28, 1964, Pulkkila - November 22, 2019) was a Finnish politician. He was elected to the Parliament of Finland in 1999 and died in office on 22 November 2019, aged 55.
