= Kusti Arhama =

Finnish politician

Kusti Gerhard Arhama (15 April 1885 – 20 May 1957; surname until 1935 Arffman) was a Finnish farmer and politician, born in Sotkamo. He was a Member of the Parliament of Finland from 1917 to 1930 and again from 1933 to 1945, representing the Agrarian League.

== Early life ==
In the early 1900s, Arhama emigrated to the United States. He returned to Finland ten years later.
