= Filip Saalasti =

Finnish farmer and politician (1866–1918)

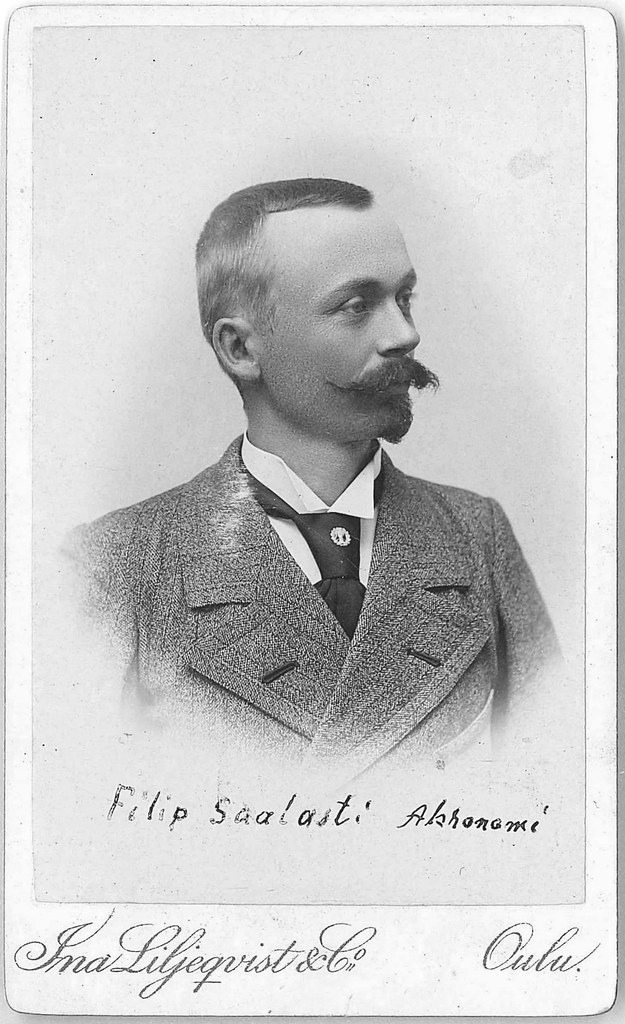
Filip Saalasti

Filippus (Filip) Saalasti (6 June 1866 – 5 April 1918) was a Finnish farmer and politician, born in Suomenniemi. He was a member of the Parliament of Finland from 1910 to 1917, representing the Agrarian League. He was the chairman of the Agrarian League from 1917 until his death in 1918.
