= Juho Heikkinen =

Finnish politician (1863–1938)

Johan (Juho) Alfred Heikkinen (20 July 1863 - 5 July 1938) was a Finnish farmer and politician, born in Oulu. He was a member of the Parliament of Finland from 1907 to 1911 and again from 1917 to 1922, representing the Agrarian League.
