= Santeri Haapanen =

Finnish politician (1877–1957)

Kaarlo Aleksanteri "Santeri" Haapanen (23 December 1877 – 25 April 1957) was a Finnish educator, farmer, and politician. Born in Puolanka, he was a member of the Parliament of Finland, representing the Finnish Party from 1909 to 1911 and the Agrarian League from 1916 to 1919.
