= Yrjö Hautala =

Finnish politician

Yrjö David Hautala (22 February 1903, Kotka – 30 April 1969) was a Finnish farmer and politician. He was a Member of the Parliament of Finland, representing the People's Party from 1933 to 1936 and the Agrarian League (which renamed itself the Centre Party in 1965) from 1945 to 1958 and again from 1962 to 1966.
