= Aarno Pesonen =

Finnish politician (1886–1927)

Aarno Fredrik Pesonen (14 October 1886, Kauhava – 12 February 1927) was a Finnish educationist and politician. He served as a Member of the Parliament of Finland from 1919 to 1924, representing the Agrarian League.
