= Erkki Haukipuro =

Finnish politician

Erkki Antero Haukipuro (18 February 1921, Raahe - 27 September 2001, Oulu) was a Finnish farmer and politician. He served as Minister of Agriculture from 4 September 1972 to 31 July 1973. He was a member of the Parliament of Finland from 1966 to 1973. He was the Governor of Oulu Province from 1973 to 1986.
