= Kusti Eskola =

Finnish farmer and politician (1911–2003)

Kustaa Oskari (Kusti) Eskola (19 August 1911 – 20 July 2003) was a Finnish farmer and politician, born in Sievi. He was a member of the Parliament of Finland from 1945 to 1962, representing the Agrarian League. He served as Deputy Minister of Transport and Public Works from 9 July to 30 October 1953, as Minister of Transport and Public Works from 30 October to 17 November 1953, from 27 May to 2 July 1957 and from 29 August 1958 to 13 January 1959 and as Minister of Agriculture from 2 July to 29 November 1957.
