= Eemil Partanen =

Finnish politician (1906–1996)

Juho Eemil Partanen
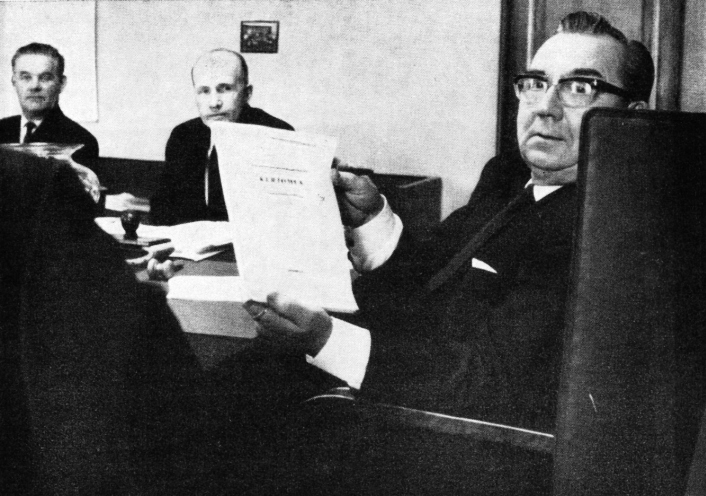
- Eemil Partanen (right) in 1965
- Born: 28 November 1906; Sotkamo, Finland
- Died: 7 April 1996 (aged 89)
- Occupation: Politician
- Office: Member of the Parliament of Finland
- Political party: Centre Party (formerly Agrarian League)

Juho Eemil (J. E.) Partanen (28 November 1906 – 7 April 1996) was a Finnish politician, born in Sotkamo. He was a member of the Parliament of Finland from 1954 to 1971, representing the Agrarian League, which changed its name to Centre Party in 1965. He served as Deputy Minister of Social Affairs from 2 April 1968 to 14 May 1970. He was a presidential elector in the 1956, 1962 and 1968 presidential elections.
