= Arthur Lagerlöf =

Johan Arthur Lagerlöf (20 May 1860 - 23 August 1930) was a Finnish lawyer, businessman and politician, born in Raahe. He was a member of the Diet of Finland in 1900 and of the Parliament of Finland from 1907 to 1911 and again from 1917 to 1919, representing the Finnish Party until 1918 and the National Coalition Party from 1918 on.
