= Salomo Pulkkinen =

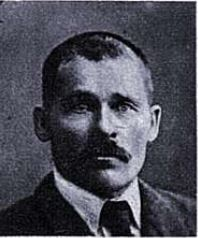
Salomo Pulkkinen, circa early 1920s

Matti Salomo Pulkkinen (15 November 1873 - 2 December 1952) was a Finnish farmer and politician, born in Ristijärvi. He was a member of the Parliament of Finland from 1911 to 1916, representing the Agrarian League.
