= Hannes Tauriainen =

Finnish politician

Hannes Tauriainen (17 March 1909 – 29 August 1971) was a Finnish smallholder and politician, born in Suomussalmi. He was imprisoned from 1939 to 1944 for political reasons. Tauriainen was a Member of the Parliament of Finland from 1948 to 1966, representing the Finnish People's Democratic League (SKDL).
