= Väinö Kokko =

Finnish politician

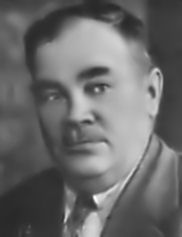
Väinö Kokko

Väinö Wilhelm Kokko (29 September 1880 – 5 December 1943) was a Finnish politician, born in Oulu. He was at first active in the Young Finnish Party. Kokko was a Member of the Parliament of Finland from 1936 until his death in 1943, representing the National Coalition Party.
