= Niilo Ryhtä =

Finnish politician

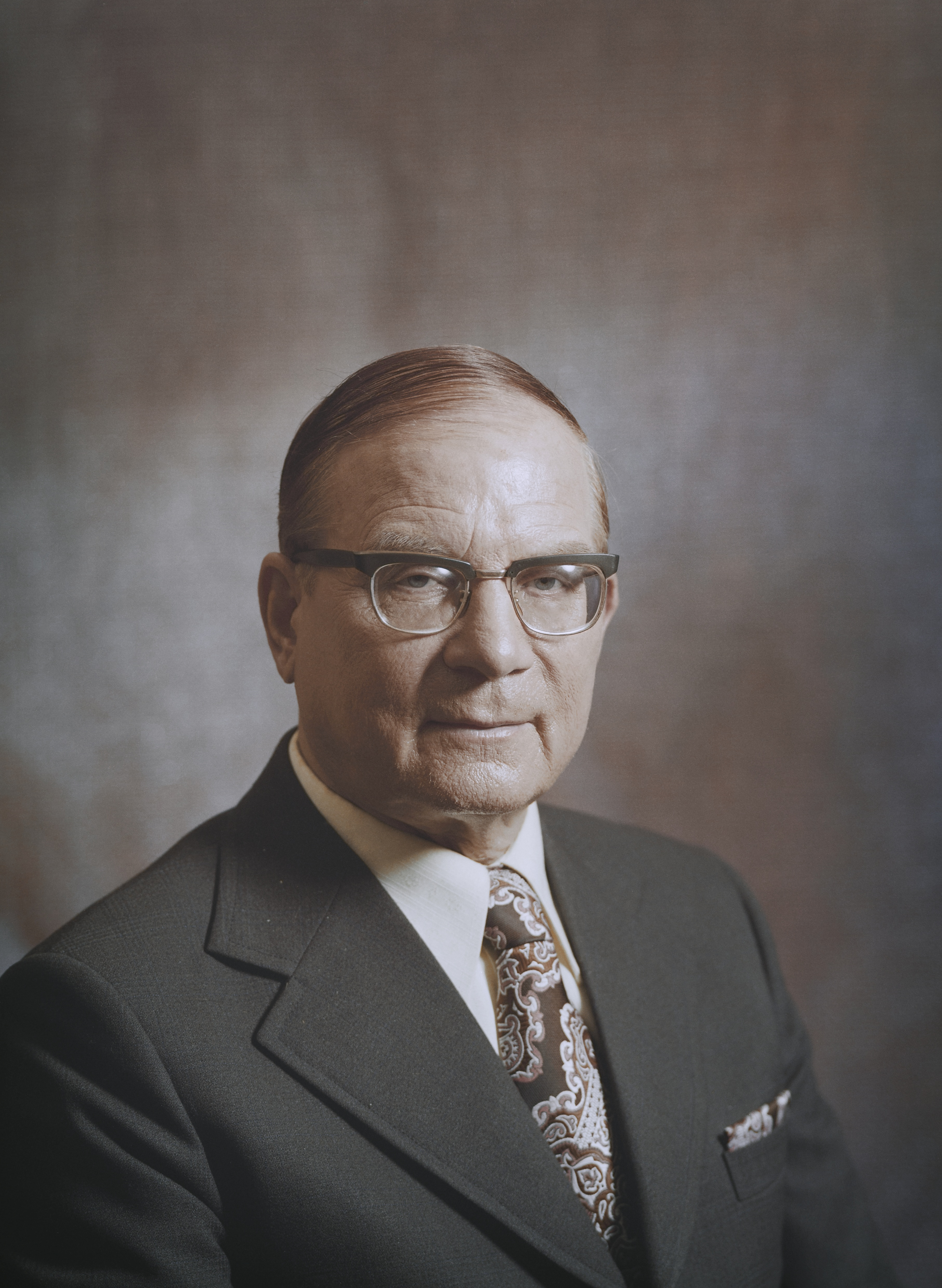
Photograph of the Finnish politician Niilo Ryhtä (1906–1995).

Niilo Mikael Ryhtä (26 September 1906 – 10 August 1995) was a Finnish politician, born in Tammela. He served as Minister of the Interior from 8 February to 18 December 1963 and from 12 September 1964 to 27 May 1966 and as Deputy Minister of Communications from 27 May 1966 to 31 August 1967. Ryhtä was a Member of the Parliament of Finland from 1948 to 1967, representing the Agrarian League, which renamed itself the Centre Party in 1965. He served as Governor of Oulu Province from 1967 to 1973.
