= Paavo Niinikoski =

Finnish politician (1926–1993)

Paavo Eevertti Niinikoski (16 March 1926 – 19 October 1993) was a Finnish politician, born in Reisjärvi. He was a member of the Parliament of Finland from 1966 to 1975, representing the Centre Party. He was a presidential elector in the 1962, 1968 and 1978 presidential elections.
