= Oskari Partanen =

Finnish farmer and politician (1878–1970)

Seth Oskari Partanen (31 August 1878 – 17 May 1970) was a Finnish farmer and politician, born in Sotkamo. He was a member of the Parliament of Finland from 1913 to 1916, representing the Agrarian League.
