= Tytti Isohookana-Asunmaa =

Finnish politician

Tytti Isohookana-Asunmaa (born 24 September 1947, in Haukipudas) is a Finnish politician. She represents the Centre Party.

Isohookana-Asunmaa holds a master's degree of Philosophy (1971) and a Doctorate of State sciences (1980). She works as assistant professor of Communal sciences in the University of Oulu. In 1983 Isohookana-Asunmaa was elected as a member of the Finnish parliament, from the Centre Party.

Isohookana-Asunmaa is married and has a son.

== Sources ==
- Tytti Isohookana-Asunmaa's home page in the Finnish parliament
