= Samuli Tuomikoski =

Finnish politician

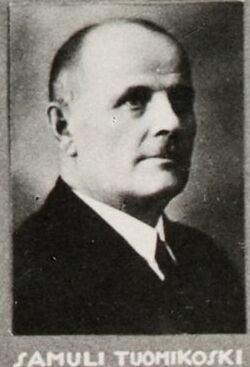
Samuli Tuomikoski

Samuli Tuomikoski (6 July 1875 – 28 October 1960) was a Finnish farmer and politician. He was born and died in Liminka, and was a member of the Parliament of Finland from 1929 to 1933, representing the National Coalition Party.
