= Kauko Hjerppe =

Finnish politician (1926–1996)

Kauko Kustaa Hjerppe (19 May 1926 – 20 June 1996) was a Finnish politician, born in Savitaipale. He was a member of the Parliament of Finland from 1966 to 1972 and from 1975 to 1978, representing the Finnish People's Democratic League (SKDL). Hjerppe was a member of the Communist Party of Finland (SKP). He served as minister of transport from 30 November 1975 to 29 September 1976. He was the governor of Kuopio Province from 1978 to 1993. He was a presidential elector in the 1968 and 1978 presidential elections.
