= Juhani Alaranta =

Finnish Lutheran pastor

Heikki Juhani Alaranta (born 20 July 1948 in Merijärvi) is a Finnish Lutheran clergyman and politician. He was a member of the Parliament of Finland from 1983 to 1999, representing the Centre Party.
