= Ivar Lantto =

Finnish politician

Ivar Fredrik Lantto (15 August 1862 – 19 November 1938) was a Finnish schoolteacher, farmer and politician, born in Tornio. He was a member of the Parliament of Finland from 1908 to 1909 and from 1916 to 1919, representing the Agrarian League.
