= Antero Väyrynen =

Finnish civil servant and politician (1916–1970)

Onni Antero Väyrynen (26 September 1916 – 2 August 1970) was a Finnish civil servant and politician, born in Kemijärvi. He served as Minister of the Interior from 1 December 1967 to 14 May 1970. He was a member of the Parliament of Finland from 1962 until his death in 1970, representing the Social Democratic Party of Finland (SDP).
