= Iisakki Vahe =

Finnish farmer and politician (1860–1929)

Isak (Iisakki) Vahe (14 July 1860 – 3 January 1929) was a Finnish farmer and politician, born in Eura. He was a member of the Parliament of Finland from 1907 to 1909 and from 1910 to 1916, representing the Finnish Party.
