= Matti Hoikka =

Finnish politician

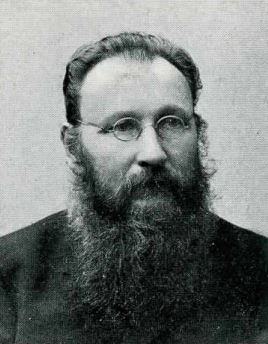
Matti Hoikka in 1907

Matts (Matti) Wiktor Hoikka (25 February 1859 – 15 July 1939) was a Finnish blacksmith and politician, born in Rovaniemi. He was a member of the Parliament of Finland from 1907 to 1914 and again from 1917 to 1918, representing the Social Democratic Party of Finland (SDP). He was imprisoned in 1918 for having sided with the Reds during the Finnish Civil War.
