= Anne Huotari =

Finnish politician

Anne Päivi Aulikki Huotari (born 31 December 1959 in Vaala, Finland) is a Finnish politician. She was a member of the Parliament of Finland from 1995 to 2007, representing the Left Alliance. Afterwards she has served on the Oulu city council.
