= Pauli Räsänen =

Finnish physician and politician

Pauli Emil Räsänen (6 October 1935, Suonenjoki – 18 February 2017, Oulu) was a Finnish physician and politician. He was a Member of the Parliament of Finland from 1966 to 1979, representing the Finnish People's Democratic League (SKDL).

Räsänen graduated as a medical doctor in 1963. He worked as a factory doctor for Oulu Oy in 1963, as a municipal doctor in Kempele, Oulunsalo and Hailuoto from 1963 to 1972 and as a health center doctor from 1972 to 1977. From 1977, he worked as a private doctor in Oulu, specializing in acupuncture.
