= Eino Rytinki =

Finnish politician

Eino Jaakko Rytinki (27 January 1903 – 30 October 1972) was a Finnish smallholder and politician, born in Pudasjärvi. He was a Member of the Parliament of Finland, representing the Small Farmers' Party of Finland from 1933 to 1936, the Small Farmers Party from 1936 to 1941 and the Agrarian League from 1941 to 1945 and again from 1949 to 1958.
