= Vappu Säilynoja =

Finnish midwife and politician (1926–2016)

Vappu Johanna Säilynoja (22 November 1926 – 28 April 2016) was a Finnish midwife and politician, born in Ylivieska. He was a member of the Parliament of Finland from 1979 to 1991, representing the Finnish People's Democratic League (SKDL) until 1990 and the Left Alliance after that.
