= Antti Meriläinen =

Finnish politician and farmer (1887-1942)

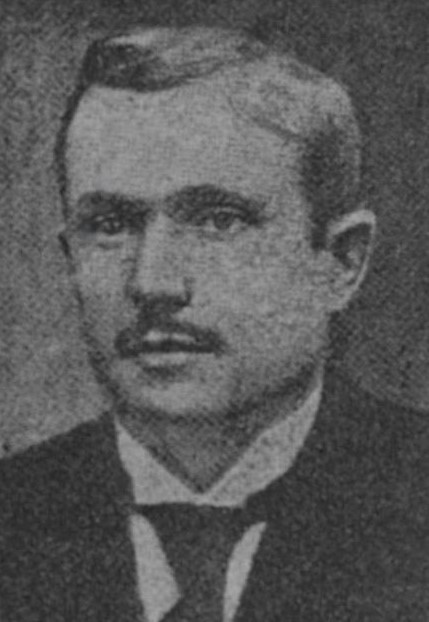
Antti Meriläinen

Antti Meriläinen (7 October 1887 - 5 March 1942) was a Finnish farmer and politician, born in Sotkamo. He was a member of the Parliament of Finland from 1919 to 1922 and from 1930 to 1939, representing the Social Democratic Party of Finland (SDP).
