= Kalle Myllylä =

Finnish politician

Kaarle (Kalle) Myllylä (14 September 1844 – 11 July 1923) was a Finnish farmer and politician, born in Kalajoki. He was a member of the Diet of Finland from 1897 to 1899 and again from 1905 to 1906 and of the Parliament of Finland from 1907 to 1910, representing the Finnish Party.
