= Ville Tikkanen (politician) =

Finnish schoolteacher and politician (1919–2013)

Ville Tikkanen (18 August 1919 – 26 May 2013) was a Finnish politician, born in Pistojärvi. He was a member of the Parliament of Finland from 1966 to 1970 and from 1970 to 1975, representing the Social Democratic Party of Finland (SDP). He was a presidential elector in the 1968 Finnish presidential election.
