= Matti Meriläinen =

Finnish politician (1889–1963)

Matti Meriläinen (26 November 1889 - 9 September 1963) was a Finnish farmer and politician, born in Sotkamo. He was a member of the Parliament of Finland from 1945 to 1954 and again from 1958 to 1962, representing the Finnish People's Democratic League (SKDL).
