= Hannes Paaso =

Finnish politician (1908 – 1970)

Hannes Gideon Paaso (12 March 1908 – 6 May 1970) was a Finnish farmer, lay preacher and politician, born in Ii, Finland. He was a Member of the Parliament of Finland from 1958 to 1970, representing the Agrarian League, which renamed itself the Centre Party in 1965.
