= Uusimaa (parliamentary electoral district) =

Electoral district of the Parliament of Finland

- Uusimaa; Nyland
- Electoral District for the Parliament of Finland
- Location of Uusimaa within Finland
- Municipality: List: Askola; Espoo; Hanko; Hyvinkää; Ingå; Järvenpää; Karkkila; Kauniainen; Kerava; Kirkkonummi; Lapinjärvi; Lohja; Loviisa; Mäntsälä; Myrskylä; Nurmijärvi; Pornainen; Porvoo; Pukkila; Raseborg; Sipoo; Siuntio; Tuusula; Vantaa; Vihti
- Region: Uusimaa
- Population: 1,068,971 (2022)
- Electorate: 801,205 (2023)
- Area: 9,354 km^{2} (2022)

Current Electoral District
- Created: 1907
- Seats: List: 37 (2023–present); 36 (2019–2023); 35 (2011–2019); 34 (2007–2011); 33 (2003–2007); 32 (1999–2003); 31 (1995–1999); 30 (1991–1995); 29 (1987–1991); 27 (1983–1987); 26 (1979–1983); 24 (1975–1979); 21 (1972–1975); 20 (1970–1972); 18 (1966–1970); 17 (1962–1966); 16 (1958–1962); 15 (1954–1958); 33 (1951–1954); 31 (1945–1951); 30 (1939–1945); 26 (1927–1939); 25 (1917–1927); 23 (1907–1917)
- Members of Parliament: List: Anders Adlercreutz (SFP); Otto Andersson (SFP); Tiina Elo (Vihr); Noora Fagerström (Kok); Maria Guzenina (SDP); Hjallis Harkimo (Liik); Inka Hopsu (Vihr); Saara Hyrkkö (Vihr); Arja Juvonen (PS); Antti Kaikkonen (Kesk); Pia Kauma (Kok); Teemu Keskisarja (PS); Pihla Keto-Huovinen (Kok); Kimmo Kiljunen (SDP); Ari Koponen (PS); Miapetra Kumpula-Natri (SDP); Johan Kvarnström (SDP); Mia Laiho (Kok); Jarno Limnell (Kok); Antti Lindtman (SDP); Leena Meri (PS); Sari Multala (Kok); Kai Mykkänen (Kok); Susanne Päivärinta (Kok); Eemeli Peltonen (SDP); Pinja Perholehto (SDP); Jorma Piisinen (PS); Mika Poutala (KD); Riikka Purra (PS); Joona Räsänen (SDP); Onni Rostila (PS); Tere Sammallahti (Kok); Jussi Saramo (Vas); Pekka Toveri (Kok); Heikki Vestman (Kok); Eerikki Viljanen (Kesk); Henrik Wickström (SFP)

Uusimaa (Swedish: Nyland) is one of the 13 electoral districts of the Parliament of Finland, the national legislature of Finland. The district was established as Uusimaa Province (Finnish: Uudenmaan lääni; Swedish: Nylands län) in 1907 when the Diet of Finland was replaced by the Parliament of Finland. It was renamed Uusimaa in 1997. It is conterminous with the region of Uusimaa but excludes the municipality of Helsinki which has its own electoral district. The district currently elects 37 of the 200 members of the Parliament of Finland using the open party-list proportional representation electoral system. At the 2023 parliamentary election it had 801,205 registered electors.

== History ==
Uusimaa Province was one 16 electoral districts established by the Election Act of the Grand Duchy of Finland (Suomen Suuriruhtinaanmaan Vaalilaki) passed by the Diet of Finland in 1906. It was conterminous with the province of Uusimaa. The municipalities of Anjala, Elimäki, Jaala and Kuusankoski were transferred from Uusimaa Province to Kymi Province in 1949. Helsinki city was separated into its own electoral district in 1952. The district was renamed Uusimaa in 1997. The municipalities of Artjärvi and Orimattila were transferred from Uusimaa to Häme in 1998.

== Electoral system ==
Uusimaa currently elects 37 of the 200 members of the Parliament of Finland using the open party-list proportional representation electoral system. Parties may form electoral alliances with each other to pool their votes and increase their chances of winning seats. However, the number of candidates nominated by an electoral alliance may not exceed the maximum number of candidates that a single party may nominate. Seats are allocated using the D'Hondt method.

== Election results ==
=== Summary ===
| Election | Left Alliance Vas / SKDL / STPV / SSTP | | | Green League Vihr | | | Social Democrats SDP / SDTP / SDP | | | Swedish People's SFP | | | Centre Kesk / ML | | | Liberals Lib / LKP / SK / KE / NP | | | National Coalition Kok / SP | | | Christian Democrats KD / SKL | | | Finns PS / SMP / SPP | | |
| Election | Votes | % | Seats | Votes | % | Seats | Votes | % | Seats | Votes | % | Seats | Votes | % | Seats | Votes | % | Seats | Votes | % | Seats | Votes | % | Seats | Votes | % | Seats |
|---|---|---|---|---|---|---|---|---|---|---|---|---|---|---|---|---|---|---|---|---|---|---|---|---|---|---|---|
| 2023 | 25,754 | 4.56% | 1 | 43,214 | 7.64% | 3 | 112,361 | 19.88% | 8 | 48,959 | 8.66% | 3 | 26,949 | 4.77% | 2 | | | | 148,145 | 26.21% | 11 | 19,717 | 3.49% | 1 | 102,689 | 18.17% | 7 |
| 2019 | 26,257 | 4.80% | 2 | 73,626 | 13.47% | 5 | 97,107 | 17.76% | 7 | 49,625 | 9.08% | 3 | 35,348 | 6.47% | 2 | | | | 114,243 | 20.90% | 9 | 14,912 | 2.73% | 1 | 86,691 | 15.86% | 6 |
| 2015 | 22,698 | 4.36% | 1 | 52,034 | 10.00% | 3 | 86,462 | 16.62% | 6 | 53,232 | 10.23% | 4 | 59,749 | 11.49% | 4 | | | | 124,754 | 23.99% | 9 | 13,750 | 2.64% | 1 | 93,411 | 17.96% | 7 |
| 2011 | 26,094 | 5.14% | 1 | 45,991 | 9.07% | 3 | 97,948 | 19.31% | 7 | 42,252 | 8.33% | 3 | 32,565 | 6.42% | 2 | | | | 144,166 | 28.42% | 11 | 14,288 | 2.82% | 1 | 95,429 | 18.82% | 7 |
| 2007 | 31,324 | 6.73% | 2 | 50,718 | 10.89% | 4 | 94,215 | 20.23% | 7 | 44,418 | 9.54% | 3 | 57,609 | 12.37% | 4 | 295 | 0.06% | 0 | 133,885 | 28.75% | 11 | 19,157 | 4.11% | 1 | 27,846 | 5.98% | 2 |
| 2003 | 40,810 | 9.10% | 3 | 47,033 | 10.49% | 4 | 114,791 | 25.59% | 9 | 46,313 | 10.33% | 3 | 60,641 | 13.52% | 5 | 3,393 | 0.76% | 0 | 104,734 | 23.35% | 8 | 15,936 | 3.55% | 0 | 5,263 | 1.17% | 1 |
| 1999 | 39,197 | 9.43% | 3 | 43,325 | 10.42% | 3 | 94,049 | 22.63% | 8 | 46,945 | 11.29% | 4 | 44,386 | 10.68% | 3 | 1,027 | 0.25% | 0 | 105,288 | 25.33% | 9 | 10,599 | 2.55% | 1 | 1,521 | 0.37% | 0 |
| 1995 | 38,847 | 9.28% | 3 | 34,080 | 8.14% | 2 | 131,286 | 31.38% | 11 | 51,465 | 12.30% | 4 | 32,227 | 7.70% | 2 | 1,478 | 0.35% | 0 | 81,574 | 19.49% | 7 | 7,364 | 1.76% | 1 | 1,865 | 0.45% | 0 |
| 1991 | 30,818 | 7.96% | 2 | 37,952 | 9.80% | 3 | 87,120 | 22.49% | 7 | 55,713 | 14.39% | 4 | 47,090 | 12.16% | 4 | 3,817 | 0.99% | 0 | 90,940 | 23.48% | 8 | 8,383 | 2.16% | 1 | 11,020 | 2.85% | 1 |
| 1987 | 28,704 | 7.28% | 2 | 22,337 | 5.67% | 1 | 106,454 | 27.00% | 9 | 50,021 | 12.69% | 4 | 25,111 | 6.37% | 2 | 8,088 | 2.05% | 0 | 104,900 | 26.61% | 9 | 8,383 | 2.13% | 0 | 15,867 | 4.02% | 1 |
| 1983 | 45,876 | 11.77% | 3 | 12,520 | 3.21% | 1 | 119,106 | 30.56% | 9 | 46,892 | 12.03% | 3 | 27,939 | 7.17% | 1 | | | | 97,724 | 25.07% | 7 | 8,263 | 2.12% | 1 | 28,337 | 7.27% | 2 |
| 1979 | 58,056 | 16.10% | 4 | | | | 96,983 | 26.89% | 8 | 41,629 | 11.54% | 3 | 25,987 | 7.20% | 2 | 21,295 | 5.90% | 1 | 82,741 | 22.94% | 7 | 13,744 | 3.81% | 1 | 9,875 | 2.74% | 0 |
| 1975 | 52,991 | 16.69% | 4 | | | | 94,233 | 29.68% | 8 | 39,745 | 12.52% | 2 | 23,975 | 7.55% | 2 | 18,391 | 5.79% | 2 | 59,626 | 18.78% | 5 | 7,269 | 2.29% | 1 | 7,181 | 2.26% | 0 |
| 1972 | 39,591 | 14.52% | 3 | | | | 90,749 | 33.28% | 8 | 39,023 | 14.31% | 3 | 17,743 | 6.51% | 2 | 19,068 | 6.99% | 1 | 44,333 | 16.26% | 3 | 6,361 | 2.33% | 0 | 13,132 | 4.82% | 1 |
| 1970 | 34,312 | 13.66% | 3 | | | | 77,817 | 30.98% | 7 | 40,220 | 16.01% | 3 | 19,463 | 7.75% | 2 | 20,018 | 7.97% | 1 | 40,181 | 16.00% | 3 | 1,719 | 0.68% | 0 | 13,418 | 5.34% | 1 |
| 1966 | 39,749 | 17.91% | 3 | | | | 75,080 | 33.83% | 6 | 37,128 | 16.73% | 3 | 23,049 | 10.38% | 2 | 16,968 | 7.64% | 1 | 21,529 | 9.70% | 2 | 658 | 0.30% | 0 | 1,078 | 0.49% | 0 |
| 1962 | 40,341 | 20.11% | 4 | | | | 49,929 | 24.89% | 5 | 39,696 | 19.79% | 3 | 23,011 | 11.47% | 2 | 14,082 | 7.02% | 1 | 21,521 | 10.73% | 2 | | | | 1,844 | 0.92% | 0 |
| 1958 | 33,249 | 20.60% | 3 | | | | 45,130 | 27.96% | 5 | 35,376 | 21.91% | 4 | 18,567 | 11.50% | 2 | 9,703 | 6.01% | 1 | 16,227 | 10.05% | 1 | 1,265 | 0.78% | 0 | | | |
| 1954 | 30,021 | 18.88% | 3 | | | | 47,643 | 29.96% | 5 | 37,020 | 23.28% | 3 | 20,613 | 12.96% | 2 | 10,476 | 6.59% | 1 | 12,936 | 8.14% | 1 | | | | | | |
| 1951 | 66,368 | 19.59% | 6 | | | | 97,815 | 28.87% | 10 | 72,388 | 21.36% | 7 | 19,066 | 5.63% | 2 | 29,950 | 8.84% | 3 | 50,633 | 14.94% | 5 | | | | | | |
| 1948 | 65,970 | 19.39% | 6 | | | | 94,402 | 27.74% | 9 | 76,150 | 22.38% | 7 | 17,258 | 5.07% | 1 | 22,466 | 6.60% | 2 | 61,346 | 18.03% | 6 | | | | | | |
| 1945 | 83,478 | 25.79% | 9 | | | | 73,335 | 22.66% | 7 | 67,978 | 21.00% | 6 | 14,014 | 4.33% | 1 | 27,689 | 8.56% | 2 | 47,558 | 14.69% | 5 | | | | | | |
| 1939 | | | | | | | 102,340 | 44.37% | 15 | 61,063 | 26.48% | 8 | 6,514 | 2.82% | 1 | 16,487 | 7.15% | 2 | 27,077 | 11.74% | 3 | | | | | | |
| 1936 | | | | | | | 87,657 | 42.14% | 12 | 65,877 | 31.67% | 9 | 6,866 | 3.30% | 0 | 16,530 | 7.95% | 2 | 18,334 | 8.81% | 2 | | | | | | |
| 1933 | | | | | | | 77,031 | 40.23% | 11 | 58,244 | 30.42% | 9 | 7,121 | 3.72% | 1 | 15,874 | 8.29% | 2 | 24,292 | 12.69% | 3 | | | | | | |
| 1930 | 4,940 | 2.65% | 0 | | | | 68,547 | 36.80% | 10 | 51,010 | 27.38% | 8 | 7,749 | 4.16% | 1 | 13,931 | 7.48% | 2 | 26,247 | 14.09% | 4 | | | | | | |
| 1929 | 17,996 | 12.39% | 3 | | | | 39,875 | 27.44% | 7 | 52,440 | 36.09% | 10 | 5,884 | 4.05% | 1 | 10,190 | 7.01% | 2 | 18,029 | 12.41% | 3 | | | | | | |
| 1927 | 18,434 | 12.66% | 3 | | | | 39,612 | 27.20% | 7 | 52,507 | 36.06% | 10 | 4,335 | 2.98% | 0 | 9,991 | 6.86% | 2 | 20,517 | 14.09% | 4 | | | | | | |
| 1924 | 16,017 | 11.36% | 3 | | | | 39,088 | 27.72% | 7 | 51,661 | 36.63% | 9 | 2,920 | 2.07% | 0 | 10,346 | 7.34% | 2 | 20,872 | 14.80% | 4 | | | | | | |
| 1922 | 25,915 | 18.41% | 5 | | | | 30,160 | 21.43% | 6 | 52,551 | 37.33% | 10 | 2,921 | 2.08% | 0 | 9,534 | 6.77% | 1 | 19,540 | 13.88% | 3 | | | | | | |
| 1919 | | | | | | | 54,681 | 37.65% | 10 | 56,087 | 38.62% | 10 | 1,545 | 1.06% | 0 | 12,691 | 8.74% | 2 | 19,153 | 13.19% | 3 | | | | | | |
| 1917 | | | | | | | 68,241 | 47.04% | 12 | 47,144 | 32.50% | 8 | | | | | | | 27,815 | 19.17% | 5 | | | | | | |
| 1916 | | | | | | | 55,725 | 47.52% | 12 | 39,730 | 33.88% | 8 | | | | 7,545 | 6.43% | 1 | 13,156 | 11.22% | 2 | | | | | | |
| 1913 | | | | | | | 42,591 | 41.07% | 10 | 40,308 | 38.86% | 9 | | | | 5,986 | 5.77% | 1 | 14,332 | 13.82% | 3 | | | | | | |
| 1911 | | | | | | | 39,475 | 36.60% | 9 | 45,593 | 42.27% | 10 | | | | 6,083 | 5.64% | 1 | 15,355 | 14.24% | 3 | | | | | | |
| 1910 | | | | | | | 40,307 | 36.59% | 9 | 45,716 | 41.50% | 10 | | | | 6,786 | 6.16% | 1 | 15,463 | 14.04% | 3 | | | | | | |
| 1909 | | | | | | | 39,745 | 36.52% | 9 | 43,123 | 39.62% | 9 | | | | 6,647 | 6.11% | 1 | 17,735 | 16.29% | 4 | | | | | | |
| 1908 | | | | | | | 39,687 | 36.91% | 9 | 41,937 | 39.00% | 9 | | | | 6,296 | 5.86% | 1 | 18,199 | 16.93% | 4 | | | | | | |
| 1907 | | | | | | | 40,951 | 34.87% | 9 | 44,544 | 37.93% | 9 | | | | 6,521 | 5.55% | 1 | 20,402 | 17.37% | 4 | | | | | | |

(Figures in italics represent joint lists.)

=== Detailed ===
==== 2020s ====
===== 2023 =====
Results of the 2023 parliamentary election held on 2 April 2023:

| Party | | Party | | | Electoral Alliance | | |
| Party | | Votes | % | Seats | Votes | % | Seats |
|---|---|---|---|---|---|---|---|
| National Coalition Party | Kok | 148,145 | 26.21% | 11 | 148,145 | 26.21% | 11 |
| Social Democratic Party of Finland | SDP | 112,361 | 19.88% | 8 | 112,361 | 19.88% | 8 |
| Finns Party | PS | 102,689 | 18.17% | 7 | 102,689 | 18.17% | 7 |
| Swedish People's Party of Finland | SFP | 48,959 | 8.66% | 3 | 48,959 | 8.66% | 3 |
| Green League | Vihr | 43,214 | 7.64% | 3 | 43,214 | 7.64% | 3 |
| Centre Party | Kesk | 26,949 | 4.77% | 2 | 26,949 | 4.77% | 2 |
| Left Alliance | Vas | 25,754 | 4.56% | 1 | 25,754 | 4.56% | 1 |
| Movement Now | Liik | 21,111 | 3.73% | 1 | 21,111 | 3.73% | 1 |
| Christian Democrats | KD | 19,717 | 3.49% | 1 | 19,717 | 3.49% | 1 |
| Freedom Alliance | VL | 4,848 | 0.86% | 0 | 5,952 | 1.05% | 0 |
| Crystal Party | KRIP | 923 | 0.16% | 0 | 5,952 | 1.05% | 0 |
| Finnish People First | SKE | 181 | 0.03% | 0 | 5,952 | 1.05% | 0 |
| Liberal Party – Freedom to Choose | Lib | 4,428 | 0.78% | 0 | 4,428 | 0.78% | 0 |
| Power Belongs to the People | VKK | 1,746 | 0.31% | 0 | 1,746 | 0.31% | 0 |
| Blue-and-Black Movement | SML | 1,363 | 0.24% | 0 | 1,363 | 0.24% | 0 |
| Animal Justice Party of Finland | EOP | 773 | 0.14% | 0 | 1,178 | 0.21% | 0 |
| Feminist Party | FP | 405 | 0.07% | 0 | 1,178 | 0.21% | 0 |
| Pirate Party | Pir | 659 | 0.12% | 0 | 659 | 0.12% | 0 |
| Communist Party of Finland | SKP | 434 | 0.08% | 0 | 434 | 0.08% | 0 |
| Birgitta Johansson (Independent) | | 267 | 0.05% | 0 | 267 | 0.05% | 0 |
| Finnish Reform Movement | KL | 247 | 0.04% | 0 | 247 | 0.04% | 0 |
| Tomi Mäkinen (Independent) | | 75 | 0.01% | 0 | 75 | 0.01% | 0 |
| Kansalaisliitto | KAL | 58 | 0.01% | 0 | 58 | 0.01% | 0 |
| Valid votes | | 565,306 | 100.00% | 37 | 565,306 | 100.00% | 37 |
| Rejected votes | | 1,934 | 0.34% | | | | |
| Total polled | | 567,240 | 70.80% | | | | |
| Registered electors | | 801,205 | | | | | |

The following candidates were elected: Anders Adlercreutz (SFP), 9,442 votes; Otto Andersson (SFP), 4,936 votes; Tiina Elo (Vihr), 3,886 votes; Noora Fagerström (Kok), 6,545 votes; Maria Guzenina (SDP), 12,088 votes; Hjallis Harkimo (Liik), 8,607 votes; Inka Hopsu (Vihr), 4,190 votes; Saara Hyrkkö (Vihr), 4,023 votes; Arja Juvonen (PS), 3,336 votes; Antti Kaikkonen (Kesk), 12,687 votes; Pia Kauma (Kok), 6,199 votes; Teemu Keskisarja (PS), 6,586 votes; Pihla Keto-Huovinen (Kok), 5,223 votes; Kimmo Kiljunen (SDP), 4,759 votes; Ari Koponen (PS), 3,021 votes; Miapetra Kumpula-Natri (SDP), 5,445 votes; Johan Kvarnström (SDP), 4,770 votes; Mia Laiho (Kok), 8,042 votes; Jarno Limnell (Kok), 13,917 votes; Antti Lindtman (SDP), 17,866 votes; Leena Meri (PS), 6,215 votes; Sari Multala (Kok), 7,208 votes; Kai Mykkänen (Kok), 15,072 votes; Susanne Päivärinta (Kok), 6,909 votes; Eemeli Peltonen (SDP), 5,747 votes; Pinja Perholehto (SDP), 5,869 votes; Jorma Piisinen (PS), 7,131 votes; Mika Poutala (KD), 4,883 votes; Riikka Purra (PS), 42,594 votes; Joona Räsänen (SDP), 4,540 votes; Onni Rostila (PS), 5,027 votes; Tere Sammallahti (Kok), 5,277 votes; Jussi Saramo (Vas), 4,944 votes; Pekka Toveri (Kok), 9,667 votes; Heikki Vestman (Kok), 9,836 votes; Eerikki Viljanen (Kesk), 2,787 votes; and Henrik Wickström (SFP), 7,306 votes.

==== 2010s ====
===== 2019 =====
Results of the 2019 parliamentary election held on 14 April 2019:

| Party | | Party | | | Electoral Alliance | | |
| Party | | Votes | % | Seats | Votes | % | Seats |
|---|---|---|---|---|---|---|---|
| National Coalition Party | Kok | 114,243 | 20.90% | 9 | 114,243 | 20.90% | 9 |
| Social Democratic Party of Finland | SDP | 97,107 | 17.76% | 7 | 97,107 | 17.76% | 7 |
| Finns Party | PS | 86,691 | 15.86% | 6 | 86,691 | 15.86% | 6 |
| Green League | Vihr | 73,626 | 13.47% | 5 | 73,626 | 13.47% | 5 |
| Swedish People's Party of Finland | SFP | 49,625 | 9.08% | 3 | 49,625 | 9.08% | 3 |
| Centre Party | Kesk | 35,348 | 6.47% | 2 | 35,348 | 6.47% | 2 |
| Left Alliance | Vas | 26,257 | 4.80% | 2 | 26,257 | 4.80% | 2 |
| Movement Now | Liik | 24,778 | 4.53% | 1 | 24,778 | 4.53% | 1 |
| Christian Democrats | KD | 14,912 | 2.73% | 1 | 14,912 | 2.73% | 1 |
| Blue Reform | SIN | 9,498 | 1.74% | 0 | 9,498 | 1.74% | 0 |
| Pirate Party | Pir | 4,083 | 0.75% | 0 | 5,916 | 1.08% | 0 |
| Liberal Party – Freedom to Choose | Lib | 1,833 | 0.34% | 0 | 5,916 | 1.08% | 0 |
| Seven Star Movement | TL | 2,754 | 0.50% | 0 | 2,754 | 0.50% | 0 |
| Communist Party of Finland | SKP | 1,247 | 0.23% | 0 | 1,247 | 0.23% | 0 |
| Animal Justice Party of Finland | EOP | 1,075 | 0.20% | 0 | 1,075 | 0.20% | 0 |
| Finnish People First | SKE | 821 | 0.15% | 0 | 1,073 | 0.20% | 0 |
| Citizens' Party | KP | 252 | 0.05% | 0 | 1,073 | 0.20% | 0 |
| Feminist Party | FP | 1,030 | 0.19% | 0 | 1,030 | 0.19% | 0 |
| Independence Party | IPU | 712 | 0.13% | 0 | 712 | 0.13% | 0 |
| Communist Workers' Party – For Peace and Socialism | KTP | 278 | 0.05% | 0 | 278 | 0.05% | 0 |
| Veeti Salo (Independent) | | 215 | 0.04% | 0 | 215 | 0.04% | 0 |
| Reform | | 183 | 0.03% | 0 | 183 | 0.03% | 0 |
| Masi Aarnio (Independent) | | 64 | 0.01% | 0 | 64 | 0.01% | 0 |
| Teemu Taskinen (Independent) | | 40 | 0.01% | 0 | 40 | 0.01% | 0 |
| Valid votes | | 546,672 | 100.00% | 36 | 546,672 | 100.00% | 36 |
| Rejected votes | | 2,585 | 0.47% | | | | |
| Total polled | | 549,257 | 70.70% | | | | |
| Registered electors | | 776,914 | | | | | |

The following candidates were elected: Anders Adlercreutz (SFP), 9,425 votes; Hussein al-Taee (SDP), 4,246 votes; Thomas Blomqvist (SFP), 6,137 votes; Tiina Elo (Vihr), 4,190 votes; Maria Guzenina (SDP), 10,005 votes; Timo Harakka (SDP), 5,436 votes; Hjallis Harkimo (Liik), 12,963 votes; Inka Hopsu (Vihr), 6,211 votes; Saara Hyrkkö (Vihr), 4,471 votes; Arja Juvonen (PS), 5,490 votes; Antti Kaikkonen (Kesk), 10,757 votes; Pia Kauma (Kok), 8,597 votes; Pihla Keto-Huovinen (Kok), 3,412 votes; Kimmo Kiljunen (SDP), 4,646 votes; Ari Koponen (PS), 5,383 votes; Noora Koponen (Vihr), 4,748 votes; Johan Kvarnström (SDP), 4,219 votes; Mia Laiho (Kok), 5,664 votes; Antero Laukkanen (KD), 3,499 votes; Elina Lepomäki (Kok), 19,292 votes; Antti Lindtman (SDP), 14,541 votes; Pia Lohikoski (Vas), 2,544 votes; Leena Meri (PS), 9,807 votes; Sari Multala (Kok), 7,724 votes; Kai Mykkänen (Kok), 14,226 votes; Mika Niikko (PS), 7,613 votes; Pirkka-Pekka Petelius (Vihr), 6,331 votes; Riikka Purra (PS), 5,960 votes; Veronica Rehn-Kivi (SFP), 5,660 votes; Antti Rinne (SDP), 12,110 votes; Jussi Saramo (Vas), 3,502 votes; Ruut Sjöblom (Kok), 4,518 votes; Riikka Slunga-Poutsalo (PS), 4,266 votes; Kari Tolvanen (Kok), 4,212 votes; Matti Vanhanen (Kesk), 5,276 votes; and Heikki Vestman (Kok), 7,429 votes.

===== 2015 =====
Results of the 2015 parliamentary election held on 19 April 2015:

| Party | | Party | | | Electoral Alliance | | |
| Party | | Votes | % | Seats | Votes | % | Seats |
|---|---|---|---|---|---|---|---|
| National Coalition Party | Kok | 124,754 | 23.99% | 9 | 124,754 | 23.99% | 9 |
| True Finns | PS | 93,411 | 17.96% | 7 | 93,411 | 17.96% | 7 |
| Social Democratic Party of Finland | SDP | 86,462 | 16.62% | 6 | 86,462 | 16.62% | 6 |
| Centre Party | Kesk | 59,749 | 11.49% | 4 | 59,749 | 11.49% | 4 |
| Swedish People's Party of Finland | SFP | 53,232 | 10.23% | 4 | 53,232 | 10.23% | 4 |
| Green League | Vihr | 52,034 | 10.00% | 3 | 52,034 | 10.00% | 3 |
| Left Alliance | Vas | 22,698 | 4.36% | 1 | 22,698 | 4.36% | 1 |
| Christian Democrats | KD | 13,750 | 2.64% | 1 | 13,750 | 2.64% | 1 |
| Pirate Party | Pir | 5,893 | 1.13% | 0 | 5,893 | 1.13% | 0 |
| Change 2011 | | 3,473 | 0.67% | 0 | 3,473 | 0.67% | 0 |
| Independence Party | IPU | 2,131 | 0.41% | 0 | 2,131 | 0.41% | 0 |
| Communist Party of Finland | SKP | 1,189 | 0.23% | 0 | 1,363 | 0.26% | 0 |
| Workers' Party of Finland | STP | 174 | 0.03% | 0 | 1,363 | 0.26% | 0 |
| Mika Vähäkangas (Independent) | | 522 | 0.10% | 0 | 522 | 0.10% | 0 |
| For the Poor | | 295 | 0.06% | 0 | 295 | 0.06% | 0 |
| Communist Workers' Party – For Peace and Socialism | KTP | 262 | 0.05% | 0 | 262 | 0.05% | 0 |
| Joni Tikka (Independent) | | 90 | 0.02% | 0 | 90 | 0.02% | 0 |
| Valid votes | | 520,119 | 100.00% | 35 | 520,119 | 100.00% | 35 |
| Rejected votes | | 2,350 | 0.45% | | | | |
| Total polled | | 522,469 | 69.86% | | | | |
| Registered electors | | 747,900 | | | | | |

The following candidates were elected: Anders Adlercreutz (SFP), 3,337 votes; Anne Berner (Kesk), 9,691 votes; Thomas Blomqvist (SFP), 6,443 votes; Simon Elo (PS), 2,907 votes; Maarit Feldt-Ranta (SDP), 8,749 votes; Maria Guzenina (SDP), 7,827 votes; Carl Haglund (SFP), 21,468 votes; Timo Harakka (SDP), 5,497 votes; Hjallis Harkimo (Kok), 11,416 votes; Arja Juvonen (PS), 2,931 votes; Antti Kaikkonen (Kesk), 10,617 votes; Johanna Karimäki (Vihr), 4,341 votes; Jyrki Kasvi (Vihr), 4,991 votes; Antero Laukkanen (KD), 2,520 votes; Sanna Lauslahti (Kok), 4,576 votes; Eero Lehti (Kok), 4,385 votes; Elina Lepomäki (Kok), 6,541 votes; Antti Lindtman (SDP), 10,687 votes; Outi Mäkelä (Kok), 6,598 votes; Sari Multala (Kok), 6,118 votes; Kai Mykkänen (Kok), 5,260 votes; Mika Niikko (PS), 4,273 votes; Jussi Niinistö (PS), 11,767 votes; Mikaela Nylander (SFP), 5,422 votes; Joona Räsänen (SDP), 5,024 votes; Antti Rinne (SDP), 12,147 votes; Veera Ruoho (PS), 2,563 votes; Pirkko Ruohonen-Lerner (PS), 3,301 votes; Timo Soini (PS), 29,527 votes; Alexander Stubb (Kok), 27,129 votes; Jani Toivola (Vihr), 6,557 votes; Kari Tolvanen (Kok), 6,531 votes; Kari Uotila (Vas), 3,152 votes; Matti Vanhanen (Kesk), 11,304 votes; and Eerikki Viljanen (Kesk), 2,902 votes.

===== 2011 =====
Results of the 2011 parliamentary election held on 17 April 2011:

| Party | | Party | | | Electoral Alliance | | |
| Party | | Votes | % | Seats | Votes | % | Seats |
|---|---|---|---|---|---|---|---|
| National Coalition Party | Kok | 144,166 | 28.42% | 11 | 144,166 | 28.42% | 11 |
| Social Democratic Party of Finland | SDP | 97,948 | 19.31% | 7 | 97,948 | 19.31% | 7 |
| True Finns | PS | 95,429 | 18.82% | 7 | 95,429 | 18.82% | 7 |
| Green League | Vihr | 45,991 | 9.07% | 3 | 45,991 | 9.07% | 3 |
| Swedish People's Party of Finland | SFP | 42,252 | 8.33% | 3 | 42,252 | 8.33% | 3 |
| Centre Party | Kesk | 32,565 | 6.42% | 2 | 32,565 | 6.42% | 2 |
| Left Alliance | Vas | 26,094 | 5.14% | 1 | 26,094 | 5.14% | 1 |
| Christian Democrats | KD | 14,288 | 2.82% | 1 | 14,288 | 2.82% | 1 |
| Pirate Party | Pir | 3,307 | 0.65% | 0 | 3,307 | 0.65% | 0 |
| Change 2011 | | 1,366 | 0.27% | 0 | 1,464 | 0.29% | 0 |
| Freedom Party – Finland's Future | VP | 98 | 0.02% | 0 | 1,464 | 0.29% | 0 |
| Communist Party of Finland | SKP | 1,308 | 0.26% | 0 | 1,308 | 0.26% | 0 |
| Independence Party | IPU | 609 | 0.12% | 0 | 1,215 | 0.24% | 0 |
| For the Poor | | 606 | 0.12% | 0 | 1,215 | 0.24% | 0 |
| Workers' Party of Finland | STP | 405 | 0.08% | 0 | 405 | 0.08% | 0 |
| Communist Workers' Party – For Peace and Socialism | KTP | 384 | 0.08% | 0 | 384 | 0.08% | 0 |
| Marita Marttunen (Independent) | | 143 | 0.03% | 0 | 143 | 0.03% | 0 |
| Mikael Lönnroth (Independent) | | 121 | 0.02% | 0 | 121 | 0.02% | 0 |
| Per-David Salminen (Independent) | | 75 | 0.01% | 0 | 75 | 0.01% | 0 |
| Panu Nikoskinen (Independent) | | 34 | 0.01% | 0 | 34 | 0.01% | 0 |
| Valid votes | | 507,189 | 100.00% | 35 | 507,189 | 100.00% | 35 |
| Rejected votes | | 2,310 | 0.45% | | | | |
| Total polled | | 509,499 | 70.54% | | | | |
| Registered electors | | 722,334 | | | | | |

The following candidates were elected: Thomas Blomqvist (SFP), 7,362 votes; Tuija Brax (Vihr), 7,882 votes; Maarit Feldt-Ranta (SDP), 7,546 votes; Christina Gestrin (SFP), 6,408 votes; Maria Guzenina-Richardson (SDP), 14,581 votes; Leena Harkimo (Kok), 4,782 votes; Lauri Ihalainen (SDP), 15,085 votes; Jouko Jääskeläinen (KD), 4,026 votes; Pietari Jääskeläinen (PS), 2,968 votes; Mikael Jungner (SDP), 8,380 votes; Johanna Jurva (PS), 2,970 votes; Arja Juvonen (PS), 2,553 votes; Antti Kaikkonen (Kesk), 3,929 votes; Johanna Karimäki (Vihr), 3,887 votes; Jyrki Katainen (Kok), 23,962 votes; Pia Kauma (Kok), 3,551 votes; Merja Kuusisto (SDP), 4,324 votes; Sanna Lauslahti (Kok), 3,312 votes; Eero Lehti (Kok), 3,993 votes; Paula Lehtomäki (Kesk), 7,356 votes; Antti Lindtman (SDP), 4,805 votes; Outi Mäkelä (Kok), 6,024 votes; Tapani Mäkinen (Kok), 4,592 votes; Marjo Matikainen-Kallström (Kok), 3,360 votes; Mika Niikko (PS), 2,703 votes; Jussi Niinistö (PS), 4,911 votes; Mikaela Nylander (SFP), 4,906 votes; Pirkko Ruohonen-Lerner (PS), 3,100 votes; Matti Saarinen (SDP), 4,253 votes; Timo Soini (PS), 43,437 votes; Alexander Stubb (Kok), 41,768 votes; Jani Toivola (Vihr), 4,174 votes; Kari Tolvanen (Kok), 5,879 votes; Kari Uotila (Vas), 3,468 votes; and Raija Vahasalo (Kok), 4,206 votes.

==== 2000s ====
===== 2007 =====
Results of the 2007 parliamentary election held on 18 March 2007:

| Party | | Party | | | Electoral Alliance | | |
| Party | | Votes | % | Seats | Votes | % | Seats |
|---|---|---|---|---|---|---|---|
| National Coalition Party | Kok | 133,885 | 28.75% | 11 | 133,885 | 28.75% | 11 |
| Social Democratic Party of Finland | SDP | 94,215 | 20.23% | 7 | 94,215 | 20.23% | 7 |
| Centre Party | Kesk | 57,609 | 12.37% | 4 | 57,609 | 12.37% | 4 |
| Green League | Vihr | 50,718 | 10.89% | 4 | 50,718 | 10.89% | 4 |
| Swedish People's Party of Finland | SFP | 44,418 | 9.54% | 3 | 44,418 | 9.54% | 3 |
| Left Alliance | Vas | 31,324 | 6.73% | 2 | 31,324 | 6.73% | 2 |
| True Finns | PS | 27,846 | 5.98% | 2 | 28,593 | 6.14% | 2 |
| Independence Party | IPU | 747 | 0.16% | 0 | 28,593 | 6.14% | 2 |
| Christian Democrats | KD | 19,157 | 4.11% | 1 | 19,157 | 4.11% | 1 |
| Communist Party of Finland | SKP | 2,103 | 0.45% | 0 | 2,103 | 0.45% | 0 |
| Pensioners for People | | 1,066 | 0.23% | 0 | 1,066 | 0.23% | 0 |
| For the Poor | | 802 | 0.17% | 0 | 802 | 0.17% | 0 |
| Communist Workers' Party – For Peace and Socialism | KTP | 528 | 0.11% | 0 | 528 | 0.11% | 0 |
| Patriotic People's Movement | IKL | 369 | 0.08% | 0 | 369 | 0.08% | 0 |
| Liberals | Lib | 295 | 0.06% | 0 | 295 | 0.06% | 0 |
| Joint List A | | 271 | 0.06% | 0 | 271 | 0.06% | 0 |
| Workers' Party of Finland | STP | 239 | 0.05% | 0 | 239 | 0.05% | 0 |
| Legal Protection Common List | | 142 | 0.03% | 0 | 142 | 0.03% | 0 |
| Valid votes | | 465,734 | 100.00% | 34 | 465,734 | 100.00% | 34 |
| Rejected votes | | 2,614 | 0.56% | | | | |
| Total polled | | 468,348 | 67.79% | | | | |
| Registered electors | | 690,853 | | | | | |

The following candidates were elected: Eero Akaan-Penttilä (Kok), 3,985 votes; Claes Andersson (Vas), 9,390 votes; Thomas Blomqvist (SFP), 7,280 votes; Maarit Feldt-Ranta (SDP), 5,949 votes; Merikukka Forsius (Vihr), 2,479 votes; Christina Gestrin (SFP), 6,402 votes; Maria Guzenina-Richardson (SDP), 12,578 votes; Leena Harkimo (Kok), 4,074 votes; Heidi Hautala (Vihr), 12,924 votes; Hanna-Leena Hemming (Kok), 4,203 votes; Antti Kaikkonen (Kesk), 4,263 votes; Antti Kalliomäki (SDP), 9,234 votes; Johanna Karimäki (Vihr), 2,659 votes; Jyrki Kasvi (Vihr), 4,880 votes; Kimmo Kiljunen (SDP), 5,940 votes; Merja Kuusisto (SDP), 5,130 votes; Jaakko Laakso (Vas), 3,074 votes; Sanna Lauslahti (Kok), 3,544 votes; Eero Lehti (Kok), 3,215 votes; Jukka Mäkelä (Kok), 3,564 votes; Outi Mäkelä (Kok), 5,808 votes; Tapani Mäkinen (Kok), 4,450 votes; Marjo Matikainen-Kallström (Kok), 6,249 votes; Sauli Niinistö (Kok), 60,563 votes; Mikaela Nylander (SFP), 4,825 votes; Pirkko Ruohonen-Lerner (PS), 1,058 votes; Tanja Saarela (Kesk), 5,712 votes; Matti Saarinen (SDP), 5,430 votes; Timo Soini (PS), 19,859 votes; Tommy Tabermann (SDP), 4,814 votes; Tarja Tallqvist (KD), 4,391 votes; Markku Uusipaavalniemi (Kesk), 2,817 votes; Raija Vahasalo (Kok), 5,296 votes; and Matti Vanhanen (Kesk), 24,112 votes.

===== 2003 =====
Results of the 2003 parliamentary election held on 16 March 2003:

| Party | | Party | | | Electoral Alliance | | |
| Party | | Votes | % | Seats | Votes | % | Seats |
|---|---|---|---|---|---|---|---|
| Social Democratic Party of Finland | SDP | 114,791 | 25.59% | 9 | 114,791 | 25.59% | 9 |
| National Coalition Party | Kok | 104,734 | 23.35% | 8 | 104,734 | 23.35% | 8 |
| Centre Party | Kesk | 60,641 | 13.52% | 5 | 60,641 | 13.52% | 5 |
| Green League | Vihr | 47,033 | 10.49% | 4 | 47,033 | 10.49% | 4 |
| Swedish People's Party of Finland | SFP | 46,313 | 10.33% | 3 | 46,313 | 10.33% | 3 |
| Left Alliance | Vas | 40,810 | 9.10% | 3 | 40,810 | 9.10% | 3 |
| Christian Democrats | KD | 15,936 | 3.55% | 0 | 22,753 | 5.07% | 1 |
| True Finns | PS | 5,263 | 1.17% | 1 | 22,753 | 5.07% | 1 |
| Pensioners for People | | 1,417 | 0.32% | 0 | 22,753 | 5.07% | 1 |
| Kirjava ”Puolue” – Elonkehän Puolesta | KIPU | 137 | 0.03% | 0 | 22,753 | 5.07% | 1 |
| Liberals | Lib | 3,393 | 0.76% | 0 | 3,393 | 0.76% | 0 |
| Communist Party of Finland | SKP | 2,128 | 0.47% | 0 | 2,128 | 0.47% | 0 |
| Forces for Change in Finland | | 1,596 | 0.36% | 0 | 1,596 | 0.36% | 0 |
| For the Poor | | 1,448 | 0.32% | 0 | 1,448 | 0.32% | 0 |
| Finland Rises – People Unites | | 971 | 0.22% | 0 | 971 | 0.22% | 0 |
| Communist Workers' Party – For Peace and Socialism | KTP | 833 | 0.19% | 0 | 833 | 0.19% | 0 |
| Finnish Federation Joint List | | 380 | 0.08% | 0 | 380 | 0.08% | 0 |
| Jukka Peltonen (Independent) | | 292 | 0.07% | 0 | 292 | 0.07% | 0 |
| Finnish People's Blue-Whites | SKS | 266 | 0.06% | 0 | 266 | 0.06% | 0 |
| Joint Responsibility Party | | 115 | 0.03% | 0 | 115 | 0.03% | 0 |
| Teemu Luojola (Independent) | | 36 | 0.01% | 0 | 36 | 0.01% | 0 |
| Valid votes | | 448,533 | 100.00% | 33 | 448,533 | 100.00% | 33 |
| Rejected votes | | 4,250 | 0.94% | | | | |
| Total polled | | 452,783 | 68.74% | | | | |
| Registered electors | | 658,732 | | | | | |

The following candidates were elected: Eero Akaan-Penttilä (Kok), 6,076 votes; Arja Alho (SDP), 7,041 votes; Ulla Anttila (Vihr), 4,189 votes; Kaarina Dromberg (Kok), 5,874 votes; Merikukka Forsius (Vihr), 2,676 votes; Heidi Hautala (Vihr), 12,675 votes; Eero Heinäluoma (SDP), 7,003 votes; Klaus Hellberg (SDP), 6,151 votes; Hanna-Leena Hemming (Kok), 6,676 votes; Antti Kaikkonen (Kesk), 4,236 votes; Antti Kalliomäki (SDP), 14,917 votes; Tanja Karpela (Kesk), 19,169 votes; Jyrki Kasvi (Vihr), 2,536 votes; Kimmo Kiljunen (SDP), 5,189 votes; Risto Kuisma (SDP), 5,602 votes; Jaakko Laakso (Vas), 5,003 votes; Eero Lankia (Kesk), 1,940 votes; Henrik Lax (SFP), 4,922 votes; Leena Luhtanen (SDP), 6,074 votes; Marjo Matikainen-Kallström (Kok), 10,807 votes; Mikaela Nylander (SFP), 5,813 votes; Susanna Rahkonen (SDP), 5,200 votes; Martin Saarikangas (Kok), 10,303 votes; Matti Saarinen (SDP), 5,867 votes; Seppo Särkiniemi (Kesk), 3,104 votes; Suvi-Anne Siimes (Vas), 17,572 votes; Juhani Sjöblom (Kok), 4,907 votes; Timo Soini (PS), 4,397 votes; Astrid Thors (SFP), 5,311 votes; Kari Uotila (Vas), 3,454 votes; Raija Vahasalo (Kok), 5,941 votes; Matti Vanhanen (Kesk), 6,917 votes; and Lasse Virén (Kok), 4,838 votes.

==== 1990s ====
===== 1999 =====
Results of the 1999 parliamentary election held on 21 March 1999:

| Party | | Party | | | Electoral Alliance | | |
| Party | | Votes | % | Seats | Votes | % | Seats |
|---|---|---|---|---|---|---|---|
| National Coalition Party | Kok | 105,288 | 25.33% | 9 | 105,288 | 25.33% | 9 |
| Social Democratic Party of Finland | SDP | 94,049 | 22.63% | 8 | 94,049 | 22.63% | 8 |
| Swedish People's Party of Finland | SFP | 46,945 | 11.29% | 4 | 46,945 | 11.29% | 4 |
| Centre Party | Kesk | 44,386 | 10.68% | 3 | 44,386 | 10.68% | 3 |
| Green League | Vihr | 43,325 | 10.42% | 3 | 43,325 | 10.42% | 3 |
| Left Alliance | Vas | 39,197 | 9.43% | 3 | 39,197 | 9.43% | 3 |
| Reform Group | Rem | 11,513 | 2.77% | 1 | 26,052 | 6.27% | 2 |
| Finnish Christian League | SKL | 10,599 | 2.55% | 1 | 26,052 | 6.27% | 2 |
| Pensioners' Party | SEP | 1,883 | 0.45% | 0 | 26,052 | 6.27% | 2 |
| True Finns | PS | 1,521 | 0.37% | 0 | 26,052 | 6.27% | 2 |
| Kirjava ”Puolue” – Elonkehän Puolesta | KIPU | 536 | 0.13% | 0 | 26,052 | 6.27% | 2 |
| Young Finns | Nuors | 9,039 | 2.17% | 0 | 10,066 | 2.42% | 0 |
| Liberal People's Party | LKP | 1,027 | 0.25% | 0 | 10,066 | 2.42% | 0 |
| Communist Party of Finland | SKP | 2,176 | 0.52% | 0 | 3,216 | 0.77% | 0 |
| Communist Workers' Party – For Peace and Socialism | KTP | 1,040 | 0.25% | 0 | 3,216 | 0.77% | 0 |
| Alliance for Free Finland | VSL | 1,309 | 0.31% | 0 | 1,309 | 0.31% | 0 |
| Pensioners for People | EKA | 758 | 0.18% | 0 | 758 | 0.18% | 0 |
| Natural Law Party | LLP | 546 | 0.13% | 0 | 546 | 0.13% | 0 |
| Finland: Non-EU Joint List | | 494 | 0.12% | 0 | 494 | 0.12% | 0 |
| Valid votes | | 415,631 | 100.00% | 32 | 415,631 | 100.00% | 32 |
| Rejected votes | | 4,895 | 1.16% | | | | |
| Total polled | | 420,526 | 66.16% | | | | |
| Registered electors | | 635,593 | | | | | |

The following candidates were elected: Eero Akaan-Penttilä (Kok), 6,038 votes; Ulla Anttila (Vihr), 6,706 votes; Kaarina Dromberg (Kok), 5,324 votes; Rainer Erlund (SFP), 6,432 votes; Merikukka Forsius (Vihr), 2,948 votes; Leena Harkimo (Kok), 11,904 votes; Klaus Hellberg (SDP), 6,780 votes; Jouko Jääskeläinen (SKL), 5,062 votes; Antti Kalliomäki (SDP), 12,792 votes; Tanja Karpela (Kesk), 4,473 votes; Tarja Kautto (SDP), 5,692 votes; Kimmo Kiljunen (SDP), 4,691 votes; Risto Kuisma (Rem), 8,994 votes; Jaakko Laakso (Vas), 5,549 votes; Henrik Lax (SFP), 5,492 votes; Leena Luhtanen (SDP), 4,864 votes; Markku Markkula (Kok), 6,721 votes; Hanna Markkula-Kivisilta (Kok), 3,770 votes; Rauha-Maria Mertjärvi (Vihr), 3,368 votes; Margareta Pietikäinen (SFP), 10,349 votes; Riitta Prusti (SDP), 6,251 votes; Susanna Rahkonen (SDP), 4,453 votes; Ola Rosendahl (SFP), 5,306 votes; Matti Saarinen (SDP), 5,740 votes; Suvi-Anne Siimes (Vas), 15,955 votes; Juhani Sjöblom (Kok), 7,027 votes; Martti Tiuri (Kok), 4,640 votes; Kari Uotila (Vas), 3,769 votes; Raija Vahasalo (Kok), 4,066 votes; Matti Vanhanen (Kesk), 5,357 votes; Paavo Väyrynen (Kesk), 8,769 votes; and Lasse Virén (Kok), 8,216 votes.

===== 1995 =====
Results of the 1995 parliamentary election held on 19 March 1995:

| Party | | Party | | | Electoral Alliance | | |
| Party | | Votes | % | Seats | Votes | % | Seats |
|---|---|---|---|---|---|---|---|
| Social Democratic Party of Finland | SDP | 131,286 | 31.38% | 11 | 131,286 | 31.38% | 11 |
| National Coalition Party | Kok | 81,574 | 19.49% | 7 | 81,574 | 19.49% | 7 |
| Swedish People's Party of Finland | SFP | 51,465 | 12.30% | 4 | 52,943 | 12.65% | 4 |
| Liberal People's Party | LKP | 1,478 | 0.35% | 0 | 52,943 | 12.65% | 4 |
| Centre Party | Kesk | 32,227 | 7.70% | 2 | 42,398 | 10.13% | 3 |
| Finnish Christian League | SKL | 7,364 | 1.76% | 1 | 42,398 | 10.13% | 3 |
| Finnish Rural Party | SMP | 1,865 | 0.45% | 0 | 42,398 | 10.13% | 3 |
| Pensioners' Party | SEP | 942 | 0.23% | 0 | 42,398 | 10.13% | 3 |
| Left Alliance | Vas | 38,847 | 9.28% | 3 | 38,847 | 9.28% | 3 |
| Green League | Vihr | 34,080 | 8.14% | 2 | 34,080 | 8.14% | 2 |
| Young Finns | Nuor | 21,670 | 5.18% | 1 | 21,670 | 5.18% | 1 |
| Other Joint List | | 4,863 | 1.16% | 0 | 4,863 | 1.16% | 0 |
| Alliance for Free Finland | VSL | 4,360 | 1.04% | 0 | 4,360 | 1.04% | 0 |
| Women's Party | NAISP | 2,920 | 0.70% | 0 | 2,920 | 0.70% | 0 |
| Communist Workers' Party – For Peace and Socialism | KTP | 1,178 | 0.28% | 0 | 2,006 | 0.48% | 0 |
| Pensioners for People | ELKA | 547 | 0.13% | 0 | 2,006 | 0.48% | 0 |
| Ecological Party the Greens | EKO | 281 | 0.07% | 0 | 2,006 | 0.48% | 0 |
| Natural Law Party | LLP | 1,293 | 0.31% | 0 | 1,293 | 0.31% | 0 |
| Joint Responsibility Party | YYP | 197 | 0.05% | 0 | 197 | 0.05% | 0 |
| Valid votes | | 418,437 | 100.00% | 31 | 418,437 | 100.00% | 31 |
| Rejected votes | | 3,798 | 0.90% | | | | |
| Total polled | | 422,235 | 69.87% | | | | |
| Registered electors | | 604,311 | | | | | |

The following candidates were elected: Claes Andersson (Vas), 13,665 votes; Ulla Anttila (Vihr), 6,818 votes; Matti Aura (Kok), 5,643 votes; Kaarina Dromberg (Kok), 4,881 votes; Tuulikki Hämäläinen (SDP), 6,573 votes; Klaus Hellberg (SDP), 5,188 votes; Jouko Jääskeläinen (SKL), 4,391 votes; Antti Kalliomäki (SDP), 17,187 votes; Minna Karhunen (Kok), 5,329 votes; Tarja Kautto (SDP), 6,835 votes; Kimmo Kiljunen (SDP), 6,349 votes; Risto Kuisma (SDP), 14,400 votes; Jaakko Laakso (Vas), 4,355 votes; Henrik Lax (SFP), 4,006 votes; Tuula Linnainmaa (Kok), 6,259 votes; Matti Louekoski (SDP), 8,872 votes; Leena Luhtanen (SDP), 4,342 votes; Hanna Markkula (Kok), 4,665 votes; Markku Markkula (Kok), 4,209 votes; Paavo Nikula (Vihr), 4,350 votes; Margareta Pietikäinen (SFP), 9,602 votes; Markku Pohjola (SDP), 3,970 votes; Riitta Prusti (SDP), 7,582 votes; Ola Rosendahl (SFP), 6,428 votes; Matti Saarinen (SDP), 5,328 votes; Jukka Tarkka (Nuor), 6,404 votes; Raimo Tiilikainen (SFP), 5,270 votes; Martti Tiuri (Kok), 5,063 votes; Kari Uotila (Vas), 4,132 votes; Matti Vanhanen (Kesk), 4,480 votes; and Paavo Väyrynen (Kesk), 9,956 votes.

===== 1991 =====
Results of the 1991 parliamentary election held on 17 March 1991:

| Party | | Party | | | Electoral Alliance | | |
| Party | | Votes | % | Seats | Votes | % | Seats |
|---|---|---|---|---|---|---|---|
| National Coalition Party | Kok | 90,940 | 23.48% | 8 | 90,940 | 23.48% | 8 |
| Social Democratic Party of Finland | SDP | 87,120 | 22.49% | 7 | 87,120 | 22.49% | 7 |
| Swedish People's Party of Finland | SFP | 55,713 | 14.39% | 4 | 55,713 | 14.39% | 4 |
| Centre Party | Kesk | 47,090 | 12.16% | 4 | 47,090 | 12.16% | 4 |
| Green League | Vihr | 37,952 | 9.80% | 3 | 37,952 | 9.80% | 3 |
| Left Alliance | Vas | 30,818 | 7.96% | 2 | 30,818 | 7.96% | 2 |
| Finnish Christian League | SKL | 8,383 | 2.16% | 1 | 12,563 | 3.24% | 1 |
| Pensioners' Party | SEP | 1,908 | 0.49% | 0 | 12,563 | 3.24% | 1 |
| Constitutional Right Party | POP | 1,522 | 0.39% | 0 | 12,563 | 3.24% | 1 |
| The Greens | EKO | 750 | 0.19% | 0 | 12,563 | 3.24% | 1 |
| Finnish Rural Party | SMP | 11,020 | 2.85% | 1 | 11,420 | 2.95% | 1 |
| Independent Non-Aligned Pensioners | ELKA | 400 | 0.10% | 0 | 11,420 | 2.95% | 1 |
| Liberal People's Party | LKP | 3,817 | 0.99% | 0 | 3,817 | 0.99% | 0 |
| Women's Party | NAISL | 3,201 | 0.83% | 0 | 3,201 | 0.83% | 0 |
| Independent Joint List | | 3,190 | 0.82% | 0 | 3,190 | 0.82% | 0 |
| Communist Workers' Party – For Peace and Socialism | KTP | 1,910 | 0.49% | 0 | 2,798 | 0.72% | 0 |
| Joint Responsibility Party | YYP | 888 | 0.23% | 0 | 2,798 | 0.72% | 0 |
| Humanity Party | | 671 | 0.17% | 0 | 671 | 0.17% | 0 |
| Valid votes | | 387,293 | 100.00% | 30 | 387,293 | 100.00% | 30 |
| Blank votes | | 8,455 | 2.12% | | | | |
| Rejected Votess – Other | | 2,136 | 0.54% | | | | |
| Total polled | | 397,884 | 68.54% | | | | |
| Registered electors | | 580,507 | | | | | |

The following candidates were elected: Claes Andersson (Vas), 5,818 votes; Ulla Anttila (Vihr), 6,963 votes; Kaarina Dromberg (Kok), 4,904 votes; Tuulikki Hämäläinen (SDP), 6,490 votes; Jouko Jääskeläinen (SKL), 4,496 votes; Marita Jurva (SMP), 5,865 votes; Antti Kalliomäki (SDP), 9,170 votes; Minna Karhunen (Kok), 4,538 votes; Tarja Kautto (SDP), 7,017 votes; Jaakko Laakso (Vas), 3,325 votes; Henrik Lax (SFP), 4,825 votes; Leila Lehtinen (Kok), 4,170 votes; Tuula Linnainmaa (Kok), 5,252 votes; Matti Louekoski (SDP), 7,384 votes; Leena Luhtanen (SDP), 5,777 votes; Hanna Markkula (Kok), 4,455 votes; Lauri Metsämäki (SDP), 5,524 votes; Tero Mölsä (Kesk), 4,455 votes; Paavo Nikula (Vihr), 4,080 votes; Saara-Maria Paakkinen (SDP), 5,322 votes; Eero Paloheimo (Vihr), 3,551 votes; Margareta Pietikäinen (SFP), 7,627 votes; Elisabeth Rehn (SFP), 16,787 votes; Jouni J. Särkijärvi (Kok), 4,458 votes; Martti Tiuri (Kok), 5,937 votes; Matti Vanhanen (Kesk), 3,828 votes; Päivi Varpasuo (Kok), 4,373 votes; Paavo Väyrynen (Kesk), 22,709 votes; Pekka Viljanen (Kesk), 1,937 votes; and Henrik Westerlund (SFP), 6,023 votes.

==== 1980s ====
===== 1987 =====
Results of the 1987 parliamentary election held on 15 and 16 March 1987:

| Party | | Votes | % | Seats |
|---|---|---|---|---|
| Social Democratic Party of Finland | SDP | 106,454 | 27.00% | 9 |
| National Coalition Party | Kok | 104,900 | 26.61% | 9 |
| Swedish People's Party of Finland | SFP | 50,021 | 12.69% | 4 |
| Finnish People's Democratic League | SKDL | 28,704 | 7.28% | 2 |
| Centre Party | Kesk | 25,111 | 6.37% | 2 |
| Green League | Vihr | 22,337 | 5.67% | 1 |
| Finnish Rural Party | SMP | 15,867 | 4.02% | 1 |
| Democratic Alternative | DEVA | 13,495 | 3.42% | 1 |
| Finnish Christian League | SKL | 8,383 | 2.13% | 0 |
| Liberal People's Party | LKP | 8,088 | 2.05% | 0 |
| Joint List A | | 5,481 | 1.39% | 0 |
| Pensioners' Party | SEP | 5,136 | 1.30% | 0 |
| Jukka Pekka Eskelinen (Independent) | | 97 | 0.02% | 0 |
| Pauli Artturi Luttinen (Independent) | | 90 | 0.02% | 0 |
| Joint List B | | 74 | 0.02% | 0 |
| Valid votes | | 394,238 | 100.00% | 29 |
| Rejected votes | | 2,041 | 0.52% | |
| Total polled | | 396,279 | 72.73% | |
| Registered electors | | 544,840 | | |

The following candidates were elected: Pirjo Ala-Kapee (SDP), 12,398 votes; Claes Andersson (SKDL), 2,919 votes; Kaj Bärlund (SDP), 7,331 votes; Kaarina Dromberg (Kok), 7,149 votes; Tuulikki Hämäläinen (SDP), 6,279 votes; Elsi Hetemäki-Olander (Kok), 9,189 votes; Olli Ikkala (Kok), 4,219 votes; Marita Jurva (SMP), 2,682 votes; Antti Kalliomäki (SDP), 7,996 votes; Lea Kärhä (Kok), 5,506 votes; Henrik Lax (SFP), 6,964 votes; Tuula Linnainmaa (Kok), 5,824 votes; Matti Louekoski (SDP), 5,884 votes; Marja-Liisa Löyttyjärvi (DEVA), 3,482 votes; Lauri Metsämäki (SDP), 6,154 votes; Per-Henrik Nyman (SFP), 4,311 votes; Saara-Maria Paakkinen (SDP), 5,156 votes; Eero Paloheimo (Vihr), 5,203 votes; Markku Pohjola (SDP), 5,585 votes; Elisabeth Rehn (SFP), 10,563 votes; Matti Saarinen (SDP), 6,106 votes; Jouni J. Särkijärvi (Kok), 8,889 votes; Martti Tiuri (Kok), 6,599 votes; Pauli Uitto (SKDL), 5,769 votes; Marjatta Väänänen (Kesk), 4,156 votes; Tauno Valo (Kok), 4,033 votes; Päivi Varpasuo (Kok), 6,340 votes; Johannes Virolainen (Kesk), 7,312 votes; and Henrik Westerlund (SFP), 7,364 votes.

===== 1983 =====
Results of the 1983 parliamentary election held on 20 and 21 March 1983:

| Party | | Party | | | Electoral Alliance | | |
| Party | | Votes | % | Seats | Votes | % | Seats |
|---|---|---|---|---|---|---|---|
| Social Democratic Party of Finland | SDP | 119,106 | 30.56% | 9 | 119,106 | 30.56% | 9 |
| National Coalition Party | Kok | 97,724 | 25.07% | 7 | 97,724 | 25.07% | 7 |
| Swedish People's Party of Finland | SFP | 46,892 | 12.03% | 3 | 46,892 | 12.03% | 3 |
| Finnish People's Democratic League | SKDL | 45,876 | 11.77% | 3 | 45,876 | 11.77% | 3 |
| Centre Party and Liberal People's Party | Kesk-LKP | 27,939 | 7.17% | 1 | 36,202 | 9.29% | 2 |
| Finnish Christian League | SKL | 8,263 | 2.12% | 1 | 36,202 | 9.29% | 2 |
| Finnish Rural Party | SMP | 28,337 | 7.27% | 2 | 30,527 | 7.83% | 2 |
| Constitutional Right Party | POP | 2,190 | 0.56% | 0 | 30,527 | 7.83% | 2 |
| Joint List A (Green League) | | 12,520 | 3.21% | 1 | 12,520 | 3.21% | 1 |
| Union for Democracy | KVL | 601 | 0.15% | 0 | 601 | 0.15% | 0 |
| Riku Rauanheimo (Independent) | | 343 | 0.09% | 0 | 343 | 0.09% | 0 |
| Valid votes | | 389,791 | 100.00% | 27 | 389,791 | 100.00% | 27 |
| Rejected votes | | 1,517 | 0.39% | | | | |
| Total polled | | 391,308 | 77.37% | | | | |
| Registered electors | | 505,760 | | | | | |

The following candidates were elected: Pirjo Ala-Kapee (SDP), 11,051 votes; Riitta-Liisa Arranz (SMP), 1,954 votes; Kaj Bärlund (SDP), 8,708 votes; Kaarina Dromberg (Kok), 5,338 votes; Tuulikki Hämäläinen (SDP), 9,852 votes; Elsi Hetemäki-Olander (Kok), 8,593 votes; Antti Kalliomäki (SDP), 6,038 votes; Lea Kärhä (Kok), 4,908 votes; Ville Komsi (List A), 4,575 votes; Helvi Koskinen (SMP), 10,966 votes; Matti Louekoski (SDP), 5,142 votes; Pekka Löyttyniemi (Kok), 5,698 votes; Impi Muroma (SKL), 7,064 votes; Peter Muurman (SDP), 6,166 votes; Pekka Myllyniemi (SDP), 5,805 votes; Saara-Maria Paakkinen (SDP), 8,063 votes; Kaisa Raatikainen (SDP), 6,139 votes; Elisabeth Rehn (SFP), 8,568 votes; Veikko Saarto (SKDL), 6,835 votes; Marja-Liisa Salminen (SKDL), 6,172 votes; Jouni J. Särkijärvi (Kok), 5,787 votes; Pär Stenbäck (SFP), 19,396 votes; Martti Tiuri (Kok), 5,169 votes; Pirkko Turpeinen (SKDL), 6,966 votes; Marjatta Väänänen (Kesk-LKP), 6,127 votes; Tauno Valo (Kok), 6,452 votes; and Henrik Westerlund (SFP), 7,106 votes.

==== 1970s ====
===== 1979 =====
Results of the 1979 parliamentary election held on 18 and 19 March 1979:

| Party | | Party | | | Electoral Alliance | | |
| Party | | Votes | % | Seats | Votes | % | Seats |
|---|---|---|---|---|---|---|---|
| Social Democratic Party of Finland | SDP | 96,983 | 26.89% | 8 | 96,983 | 26.89% | 8 |
| National Coalition Party | Kok | 82,741 | 22.94% | 7 | 82,741 | 22.94% | 7 |
| Finnish People's Democratic League | SKDL | 58,056 | 16.10% | 4 | 58,553 | 16.23% | 4 |
| Socialist Workers Party | STP | 497 | 0.14% | 0 | 58,553 | 16.23% | 4 |
| Swedish People's Party of Finland | SFP | 41,629 | 11.54% | 3 | 41,629 | 11.54% | 3 |
| Centre Party | Kesk | 25,987 | 7.20% | 2 | 25,987 | 7.20% | 2 |
| Finnish Christian League | SKL | 13,744 | 3.81% | 1 | 23,619 | 6.55% | 1 |
| Finnish Rural Party | SMP | 9,875 | 2.74% | 0 | 23,619 | 6.55% | 1 |
| Liberal People's Party | LKP | 21,295 | 5.90% | 1 | 22,015 | 6.10% | 1 |
| Finnish People's Unity Party | SKYP | 720 | 0.20% | 0 | 22,015 | 6.10% | 1 |
| Constitutional People's Party | PKP | 8,724 | 2.42% | 0 | 8,724 | 2.42% | 0 |
| Party of Finnish Entrepreneurs | SYP | 453 | 0.13% | 0 | 453 | 0.13% | 0 |
| Valid votes | | 360,704 | 100.00% | 26 | 360,704 | 100.00% | 26 |
| Rejected votes | | 1,602 | 0.44% | | | | |
| Total polled | | 362,306 | 77.06% | | | | |
| Registered electors | | 470,186 | | | | | |

The following candidates were elected: Pirjo Ala-Kapee (SDP), 8,830 votes; Kaj Bärlund (SDP), 5,267 votes; Ilkka-Christian Björklund (SKDL), 9,339 votes; Matti Hakala (Kok), 4,883 votes; Veikko Helle (SDP), 8,612 votes; Elsi Hetemäki-Olander (Kok), 15,275 votes; Esko Koppanen (Kok), 4,222 votes; Pekka Löyttyniemi (Kok), 5,217 votes; Sinikka Luja-Penttilä (SDP), 6,652 votes; Toivo Mäkynen (Kok), 5,861 votes; Impi Muroma (SKL), 6,605 votes; Peter Muurman (SDP), 5,027 votes; Terhi Nieminen (LKP), 7,901 votes; Saara-Maria Paakkinen (SDP), 5,104 votes; Kaisa Raatikainen (SDP), 5,890 votes; Elisabeth Rehn (SFP), 3,672 votes; Irma Rihtniemi-Koski (Kok), 5,788 votes; Veikko Saarto (SKDL), 8,227 votes; Marja-Liisa Salminen (SKDL), 10,908 votes; Pär Stenbäck (SFP), 9,373 votes; Ulf Sundqvist (SDP), 7,869 votes; Pauli Uitto (SKDL), 7,835 votes; Marjatta Väänänen (Kesk), 7,289 votes; Tauno Valo (Kok), 7,229 votes; Johannes Virolainen (Kesk), 7,236 votes; and Henrik Westerlund (SFP), 6,528 votes.

===== 1975 =====
Results of the 1975 parliamentary election held on 21 and 22 September 1975:

| Party | | Party | | | Electoral Alliance | | |
| Party | | Votes | % | Seats | Votes | % | Seats |
|---|---|---|---|---|---|---|---|
| Social Democratic Party of Finland | SDP | 94,233 | 29.68% | 8 | 94,233 | 29.68% | 8 |
| Swedish People's Party of Finland | SFP | 39,745 | 12.52% | 2 | 89,380 | 28.15% | 7 |
| Centre Party | Kesk | 23,975 | 7.55% | 2 | 89,380 | 28.15% | 7 |
| Liberal People's Party | LKP | 18,391 | 5.79% | 2 | 89,380 | 28.15% | 7 |
| Finnish Christian League | SKL | 7,269 | 2.29% | 1 | 89,380 | 28.15% | 7 |
| National Coalition Party | Kok | 59,626 | 18.78% | 5 | 60,609 | 19.09% | 5 |
| Finnish People's Unity Party | SKYP | 983 | 0.31% | 0 | 60,609 | 19.09% | 5 |
| Finnish People's Democratic League | SKDL | 52,991 | 16.69% | 4 | 54,927 | 17.30% | 4 |
| Socialist Workers Party | STP | 1,936 | 0.61% | 0 | 54,927 | 17.30% | 4 |
| Finnish Constitutional People's Party | SPK | 9,459 | 2.98% | 0 | 9,459 | 2.98% | 0 |
| Finnish Rural Party | SMP | 7,181 | 2.26% | 0 | 8,849 | 2.79% | 0 |
| Party of Finnish Entrepreneurs | SYP | 1,668 | 0.53% | 0 | 8,849 | 2.79% | 0 |
| Valid votes | | 317,457 | 100.00% | 24 | 317,457 | 100.00% | 24 |
| Rejected votes | | 1,478 | 0.46% | | | | |
| Total polled | | 318,935 | 75.40% | | | | |
| Registered electors | | 422,991 | | | | | |

The following candidates were elected: Ilkka-Christian Björklund (SKDL), 8,136 votes; Veikko Helle (SDP), 6,687 votes; Elsi Hetemäki (Kok), 11,689 votes; Sven-Erik Järvinen (SDP), 5,376 votes; Markus Kainulainen (SKDL), 8,878 votes; Esko Koppanen (Kok), 4,260 votes; Irma Koski (Kok), 4,451 votes; Lars Lindeman (SDP), 6,251 votes; Sinikka Luja-Vepsä (SDP), 8,422 votes; Impi Muroma (SKL), 6,621 votes; Peter Muurman (SDP), 5,178 votes; Terhi Nieminen (LKP), 7,842 votes; Veikko Pajunen (SDP), 5,854 votes; Kaisa Raatikainen (SDP), 6,609 votes; Veikko Saarto (SKDL), 8,184 votes; Antero Salmenkivi (Kok), 9,721 votes; Markku Salonen (Kok), 3,842 votes; Pär Stenbäck (SFP), 12,068 votes; Ulf Sundqvist (SDP), 11,026 votes; Pauli Uitto (SKDL), 7,725 votes; Marjatta Väänänen (Kesk), 10,684 votes; Johannes Virolainen (Kesk), 7,038 votes; Henrik Westerlund (SFP), 7,423 votes; and Seppo Westerlund (LKP), 7,258 votes.

===== 1972 =====
Results of the 1972 parliamentary election held on 2 and 3 January 1972:

| Party | | Party | | | Electoral Alliance | | |
| Party | | Votes | % | Seats | Votes | % | Seats |
|---|---|---|---|---|---|---|---|
| Social Democratic Party of Finland | SDP | 90,749 | 33.28% | 8 | 90,749 | 33.28% | 8 |
| Swedish People's Party of Finland | SFP | 39,023 | 14.31% | 3 | 56,766 | 20.81% | 5 |
| Centre Party | Kesk | 17,743 | 6.51% | 2 | 56,766 | 20.81% | 5 |
| National Coalition Party | Kok | 44,333 | 16.26% | 3 | 44,333 | 16.26% | 3 |
| Finnish People's Democratic League | SKDL | 39,591 | 14.52% | 3 | 42,310 | 15.51% | 3 |
| Social Democratic Union of Workers and Smallholders | TPSL | 2,719 | 1.00% | 0 | 42,310 | 15.51% | 3 |
| Finnish Rural Party | SMP | 13,132 | 4.82% | 1 | 19,493 | 7.15% | 1 |
| Finnish Christian League | SKL | 6,361 | 2.33% | 0 | 19,493 | 7.15% | 1 |
| Liberal People's Party | LKP | 19,068 | 6.99% | 1 | 19,068 | 6.99% | 1 |
| Valid votes | | 272,719 | 100.00% | 21 | 272,719 | 100.00% | 21 |
| Rejected votes | | 1,188 | 0.43% | | | | |
| Total polled | | 273,907 | 80.86% | | | | |
| Registered electors | | 338,741 | | | | | |

The following candidates were elected: Ilkka-Christian Björklund (SKDL), 8,755 votes; Veikko Helle (SDP), 6,835 votes; Elsi Hetemäki (Kok), 8,424 votes; Osmo Kaipainen (SDP), 8,366 votes; Lauri Kantola (SKDL), 5,774 votes; Esko Koppanen (Kok), 6,183 votes; Rainer Lemström (SMP), 2,437 votes; Lars Lindeman (SDP), 5,153 votes; Sinikka Luja-Vepsä (SDP), 7,509 votes; Matti Mattila (Kesk), 4,696 votes; Veikko Pajunen (SDP), 14,260 votes; Victor Procopé (SFP), 5,395 votes; Kaisa Raatikainen (SDP), 5,679 votes; Veikko Saarto (SKDL), 7,737 votes; Antero Salmenkivi (Kok), 8,749 votes; Kaarle Salmivuori (SDP), 6,071 votes; Pär Stenbäck (SFP), 12,109 votes; Ulf Sundqvist (SDP), 9,394 votes; Johannes Virolainen (Kesk), 7,723 votes; Henrik Westerlund (SFP), 7,041 votes; and Seppo Westerlund (LKP), 4,455 votes.

===== 1970 =====
Results of the 1970 parliamentary election held on 15 and 16 March 1970:

| Party | | Party | | | Electoral Alliance | | |
| Party | | Votes | % | Seats | Votes | % | Seats |
|---|---|---|---|---|---|---|---|
| Social Democratic Party of Finland | SDP | 77,817 | 30.98% | 7 | 77,817 | 30.98% | 7 |
| Swedish People's Party of Finland | SFP | 40,220 | 16.01% | 3 | 40,220 | 16.01% | 3 |
| National Coalition Party | Kok | 40,181 | 16.00% | 3 | 40,181 | 16.00% | 3 |
| Finnish People's Democratic League | SKDL | 34,312 | 13.66% | 3 | 34,312 | 13.66% | 3 |
| Centre Party | Kesk | 19,463 | 7.75% | 2 | 21,182 | 8.43% | 2 |
| Finnish Christian League | SKL | 1,719 | 0.68% | 0 | 21,182 | 8.43% | 2 |
| Liberal People's Party | LKP | 20,018 | 7.97% | 1 | 20,018 | 7.97% | 1 |
| Finnish Rural Party | SMP | 13,418 | 5.34% | 1 | 13,418 | 5.34% | 1 |
| Social Democratic Union of Workers and Smallholders | TPSL | 3,863 | 1.54% | 0 | 3,863 | 1.54% | 0 |
| Esko Keski-Kuha (Independent) | | 143 | 0.06% | 0 | 143 | 0.06% | 0 |
| Valid votes | | 251,154 | 100.00% | 20 | 251,154 | 100.00% | 20 |
| Rejected votes | | 830 | 0.33% | | | | |
| Total polled | | 251,984 | 81.70% | | | | |
| Registered electors | | 308,433 | | | | | |

The following candidates were elected: Veikko Helle (SDP), 6,372 votes; Elsi Hetemäki (Kok), 4,176 votes; Osmo Kaipainen (SDP), 8,131 votes; Lauri Kantola (SKDL), 4,236 votes; Esko Koppanen (Kok), 5,823 votes; Lars Lindeman (SDP), 6,541 votes; Sinikka Luja (SDP), 7,745 votes; Matti Mattila (Kesk), 3,952 votes; Victor Procopé (SFP), 5,445 votes; Kaisa Raatikainen (SDP), 4,957 votes; Veikko Saarto (SKDL), 5,158 votes; Antero Salmenkivi (Kok), 4,034 votes; Kaarle Salmivuori (SDP), 4,845 votes; Matti Silander (SMP), 1,557 votes; Pär Stenbäck (SFP), 7,092 votes; Ulf Sundqvist (SDP), 7,593 votes; Johannes Virolainen (Kesk), 7,087 votes; Rainer Virtanen (SKDL), 5,508 votes; Henrik Westerlund (SFP), 7,180 votes; and Seppo Westerlund (LKP), 3,531 votes.

==== 1960s ====
===== 1966 =====
Results of the 1966 parliamentary election held on 20 and 21 March 1966:

| Party | | Party | | | Electoral Alliance | | |
| Party | | Votes | % | Seats | Votes | % | Seats |
|---|---|---|---|---|---|---|---|
| Social Democratic Party of Finland | SDP | 75,080 | 33.83% | 6 | 75,080 | 33.83% | 6 |
| Finnish People's Democratic League | SKDL | 39,749 | 17.91% | 3 | 46,334 | 20.88% | 4 |
| Social Democratic Union of Workers and Smallholders | TPSL | 6,585 | 2.97% | 1 | 46,334 | 20.88% | 4 |
| Swedish People's Party of Finland | SFP | 37,128 | 16.73% | 3 | 37,128 | 16.73% | 3 |
| Centre Party | Kesk | 23,049 | 10.38% | 2 | 23,707 | 10.68% | 2 |
| Finnish Christian League | SKL | 658 | 0.30% | 0 | 23,707 | 10.68% | 2 |
| National Coalition Party | Kok | 21,529 | 9.70% | 2 | 21,634 | 9.75% | 2 |
| Independence Party | | 105 | 0.05% | 0 | 21,634 | 9.75% | 2 |
| Liberal People's Party | LKP | 16,968 | 7.64% | 1 | 16,968 | 7.64% | 1 |
| Smallholders' Party of Finland | SPP | 1,078 | 0.49% | 0 | 1,078 | 0.49% | 0 |
| Write-in lists | | 24 | 0.01% | 0 | 24 | 0.01% | 0 |
| Valid votes | | 221,953 | 100.00% | 18 | 221,953 | 100.00% | 18 |
| Blank votes | | 120 | 0.05% | | | | |
| Rejected Votess – Other | | 576 | 0.26% | | | | |
| Total polled | | 222,649 | 84.99% | | | | |
| Registered electors | | 261,979 | | | | | |

The following candidates were elected: Saara Forsius (Kok), 3,574 votes; Veikko Helle (SDP), 8,791 votes; Lauri Kantola (SKDL), 4,673 votes; Esko Koppanen (Kok), 4,017 votes; Magnus Kull (SFP), 5,019 votes; Lars Lindeman (SDP), 9,655 votes; Ilmari Linna (SDP), 6,925 votes; Sinikka Luja (SDP), 4,662 votes; Matti Mattila (Kesk), 4,810 votes; Pekka Pesola (LKP), 2,285 votes; Victor Procopé (SFP), 5,077 votes; Olavi Saarinen (TPSL), 6,488 votes; Veikko Saarto (SKDL), 5,285 votes; Eino Sirén (SDP), 6,748 votes; Johannes Virolainen (Kesk), 9,069 votes; Rainer Virtanen (SKDL), 4,833 votes; and Henrik Westerlund (SFP), 5,286 votes.

===== 1962 =====
Results of the 1962 parliamentary election held on 4 and 5 February 1962:

| Party | | Party | | | Electoral Alliance | | |
| Party | | Votes | % | Seats | Votes | % | Seats |
|---|---|---|---|---|---|---|---|
| Social Democratic Party of Finland | SDP | 49,929 | 24.89% | 5 | 49,929 | 24.89% | 5 |
| Finnish People's Democratic League | SKDL | 40,341 | 20.11% | 4 | 40,341 | 20.11% | 4 |
| Swedish People's Party of Finland | SFP | 39,696 | 19.79% | 3 | 39,696 | 19.79% | 3 |
| Agrarian Party | ML | 23,011 | 11.47% | 2 | 23,374 | 11.65% | 2 |
| Centre Party | | 295 | 0.15% | 0 | 23,374 | 11.65% | 2 |
| Smallholders' Party Opposition | | 68 | 0.03% | 0 | 23,374 | 11.65% | 2 |
| National Coalition Party | Kok | 21,521 | 10.73% | 2 | 22,849 | 11.39% | 2 |
| Liberal League | VL | 1,328 | 0.66% | 0 | 22,849 | 11.39% | 2 |
| People's Party of Finland | SK | 14,082 | 7.02% | 1 | 14,082 | 7.02% | 1 |
| Social Democratic Union of Workers and Smallholders | TPSL | 8,468 | 4.22% | 0 | 8,468 | 4.22% | 0 |
| Smallholders' Party of Finland | SPP | 1,844 | 0.92% | 0 | 1,844 | 0.92% | 0 |
| Write-in lists | | 5 | 0.00% | 0 | 5 | 0.00% | 0 |
| Valid votes | | 200,588 | 100.00% | 17 | 200,588 | 100.00% | 17 |
| Rejected votes | | 586 | 0.29% | | | | |
| Total polled | | 201,174 | 84.09% | | | | |
| Registered electors | | 239,244 | | | | | |

The following candidates were elected: Saara Forsius (Kok), 4,614 votes; Veikko Helle (SDP), 6,070 votes; Gunnar Henriksson (SDP), 5,119 votes; Sven Högström (SFP), 7,430 votes; Lauri Kantola (SKDL), 3,584 votes; Esko Koppanen (Kok), 3,877 votes; Lars Lindeman (SDP), 5,878 votes; Bertel Lindh (SFP), 6,365 votes; Ilmari Linna (SDP), 4,077 votes; Matti Mattila (ML), 6,147 votes; Kurt Nordfors (SFP), 8,757 votes; Gösta Rosenberg (SKDL), 3,670 votes; Toivo Salin (SKDL), 3,454 votes; Eino Sirén (SDP), 4,293 votes; Aaro Stykki (SK), 1,664 votes; Johannes Virolainen (ML), 8,805 votes; and Rainer Virtanen (SKDL), 3,668 votes.

==== 1950s ====
===== 1958 =====
Results of the 1958 parliamentary election held on 6 and 7 July 1958:

| Party | | Party | | | Electoral Alliance | | |
| Party | | Votes | % | Seats | Votes | % | Seats |
|---|---|---|---|---|---|---|---|
| Social Democratic Party of Finland | SDP | 45,130 | 27.96% | 5 | 45,130 | 27.96% | 5 |
| Swedish People's Party of Finland | SFP | 35,376 | 21.91% | 4 | 35,376 | 21.91% | 4 |
| Finnish People's Democratic League | SKDL | 33,249 | 20.60% | 3 | 33,249 | 20.60% | 3 |
| Agrarian Party | ML | 18,567 | 11.50% | 2 | 18,567 | 11.50% | 2 |
| National Coalition Party | Kok | 16,227 | 10.05% | 1 | 16,227 | 10.05% | 1 |
| People's Party of Finland | SK | 9,703 | 6.01% | 1 | 10,072 | 6.24% | 1 |
| Liberal League | VL | 369 | 0.23% | 0 | 10,072 | 6.24% | 1 |
| Free Citizens and Centre List | | 1,353 | 0.84% | 0 | 1,353 | 0.84% | 0 |
| Finnish Christian League | SKL | 1,265 | 0.78% | 0 | 1,265 | 0.78% | 0 |
| People's Co-operation League | | 160 | 0.10% | 0 | 160 | 0.10% | 0 |
| Write-in lists | | 33 | 0.02% | 0 | 33 | 0.02% | 0 |
| Valid votes | | 161,432 | 100.00% | 16 | 161,432 | 100.00% | 16 |
| Rejected votes | | 668 | 0.41% | | | | |
| Total polled | | 162,100 | 73.42% | | | | |
| Registered electors | | 220,797 | | | | | |

The following candidates were elected: Saara Forsius (Kok), 3,453 votes; Veikko Helle (SDP), 4,157 votes; Gunnar Henriksson (SDP), 5,805 votes; Sven Högström (SFP), 3,953 votes; Lars Lindeman (SDP), 3,233 votes; Bertel Lindh (SFP), 7,353 votes; Matti Mattila (ML), 4,658 votes; Kurt Nordfors (SFP), 9,097 votes; Kaarlo Pitsinki (SDP), 5,331 votes; Victor Procopé (SFP), 3,823 votes; Gösta Rosenberg (SKDL), 3,624 votes; Toivo Salin (SKDL), 3,030 votes; Martta Salmela-Järvinen (SDP), 6,663 votes; Aaro Stykki (SK), 1,148 votes; Johannes Virolainen (ML), 5,266 votes; and Rainer Virtanen (SKDL), 3,970 votes.

===== 1954 =====
Results of the 1954 parliamentary election held on 7 and 8 March 1954:

| Party | | Party | | | Electoral Alliance | | |
| Party | | Votes | % | Seats | Votes | % | Seats |
|---|---|---|---|---|---|---|---|
| Social Democratic Party of Finland | SDP | 47,643 | 29.96% | 5 | 47,643 | 29.96% | 5 |
| Swedish People's Party of Finland | SFP | 37,020 | 23.28% | 3 | 37,020 | 23.28% | 3 |
| Finnish People's Democratic League | SKDL | 30,021 | 18.88% | 3 | 30,021 | 18.88% | 3 |
| Agrarian Party | ML | 20,613 | 12.96% | 2 | 20,913 | 13.15% | 2 |
| Liberal League | VL | 300 | 0.19% | 0 | 20,913 | 13.15% | 2 |
| National Coalition Party | Kok | 12,936 | 8.14% | 1 | 12,936 | 8.14% | 1 |
| People's Party of Finland | SK | 10,476 | 6.59% | 1 | 10,476 | 6.59% | 1 |
| Write-in lists | | 7 | 0.00% | 0 | 7 | 0.00% | 0 |
| Valid votes | | 159,016 | 100.00% | 15 | 159,016 | 100.00% | 15 |
| Rejected votes | | 611 | 0.38% | | | | |
| Total polled | | 159,627 | 79.75% | | | | |
| Registered electors | | 200,147 | | | | | |

The following candidates were elected: Saara Forsius (Kok); Veikko Helle (SDP); Gunnar Henriksson (SDP); Sven Högström (SFP); Hertta Kuusinen (SKDL); J. E. Lampinen (ML); Bertel Lindh (SFP); Juho Niukkanen (ML); Kurt Nordfors (SFP); Gösta Rosenberg (SKDL); Eino Saari (SK); Martta Salmela-Järvinen (SDP); Bruno Sundman (SDP); Unto Suominen (SDP); and Rainer Virtanen (SKDL).

===== 1951 =====
Results of the 1951 parliamentary election held on 1 and 2 July 1951:

| Party | | Party | | | Electoral Alliance | | |
| Party | | Votes | % | Seats | Votes | % | Seats |
|---|---|---|---|---|---|---|---|
| Social Democratic Party of Finland | SDP | 97,815 | 28.87% | 10 | 97,815 | 28.87% | 10 |
| Swedish People's Party of Finland | SFP | 72,388 | 21.36% | 7 | 72,388 | 21.36% | 7 |
| Finnish People's Democratic League | SKDL | 66,368 | 19.59% | 6 | 66,368 | 19.59% | 6 |
| National Coalition Party | Kok | 50,633 | 14.94% | 5 | 52,045 | 15.36% | 5 |
| Liberal League | VL | 1,132 | 0.33% | 0 | 52,045 | 15.36% | 5 |
| Finnish People's Party | | 243 | 0.07% | 0 | 52,045 | 15.36% | 5 |
| Small Farmers Party | | 37 | 0.01% | 0 | 52,045 | 15.36% | 5 |
| People's Party of Finland | SK | 29,950 | 8.84% | 3 | 29,950 | 8.84% | 3 |
| Agrarian Party | ML | 19,066 | 5.63% | 2 | 19,066 | 5.63% | 2 |
| Radical People's Party | | 1,191 | 0.35% | 0 | 1,191 | 0.35% | 0 |
| Write-in lists | | 34 | 0.01% | 0 | 34 | 0.01% | 0 |
| Valid votes | | 338,857 | 100.00% | 33 | 338,857 | 100.00% | 33 |
| Rejected votes | | 1,475 | 0.43% | | | | |
| Total polled | | 340,332 | 76.12% | | | | |
| Registered electors | | 447,083 | | | | | |

The following candidates were elected: Margit Borg-Sundman (Kok); Karl-August Fagerholm (SDP); Veikko Helle (SDP); Gunnar Henriksson (SDP); Lassi Hiekkala (SK); Emil Huunonen (SDP); Aune Innala (Kok); Konsti Järnefelt (SK); Esa Kaitila (SK); Sylvi-Kyllikki Kilpi (SKDL); Henrik Kullberg (SFP); Hertta Kuusinen (SKDL); J. E. Lampinen (ML); Jussi Lappi-Seppälä (Kok); Tyyne Leivo-Larsson (SDP); Väinö Leskinen (SDP); Nils Meinander (SFP); Juho Niukkanen (ML); Kurt Nordfors (SFP); Arne Öhman (SFP); Ebba Östenson (SFP); John Österholm (SFP); Ville Pessi (SKDL); Gösta Rosenberg (SKDL); Mauri Ryömä (SKDL); Martta Salmela-Järvinen (SDP); Arvo Salminen (Kok); Bruno Sundman (SDP); Unto Suominen (SDP); Väinö Tanner (SDP); Arno Tuurna (Kok); Ernst von Born (SFP); and Atos Wirtanen (SKDL).

==== 1940s ====
===== 1948 =====
Results of the 1948 parliamentary election held on 1 and 2 July 1948:

| Party | | Votes | % | Seats |
|---|---|---|---|---|
| Social Democratic Party of Finland | SDP | 94,402 | 27.74% | 9 |
| Swedish People's Party of Finland | SFP | 76,150 | 22.38% | 7 |
| Finnish People's Democratic League | SKDL | 65,970 | 19.39% | 6 |
| National Coalition Party | Kok | 61,346 | 18.03% | 6 |
| National Progressive Party | KE | 22,466 | 6.60% | 2 |
| Agrarian Party | ML | 17,258 | 5.07% | 1 |
| Others | | 2,663 | 0.78% | 0 |
| Valid votes | | 340,255 | 100.00% | 31 |
| Rejected votes | | 1,656 | 0.48% | |
| Total polled | | 341,911 | 79.11% | |
| Registered electors | | 432,223 | | |

The following candidates were elected: Gunnar Andersson (SDP); Margit Borg-Sundman (Kok); Karl-August Fagerholm (SDP); Gunnar Henriksson (SDP); Lassi Hiekkala (KE); Emil Huunonen (SDP); Heikki Hykkäälä (SDP); Erkki Härmä (SDP); Rakel Jalas (Kok); Kalle Kauppi (KE); Sylvi-Kyllikki Kilpi (SKDL); Usko Koski (Kok); Henrik Kullberg (SFP); Hertta Kuusinen (SKDL); J. E. Lampinen (ML); Jussi Lappi-Seppälä (Kok); Erkki Leikola (Kok); Tyyne Leivo-Larsson (SDP); Nils Meinander (SFP); Arne Öhman (SFP); Arvi Oksala (Kok); Ebba Östenson (SFP); John Österholm (SFP); Ville Pessi (SKDL); Gösta Rosenberg (SKDL); Mauri Ryömä (SKDL); Martta Salmela-Järvinen (SDP); J. O. Söderhjelm (SFP); Unto Varjonen (SDP); Ernst von Born (SFP); and Atos Wirtanen (SKDL).

===== 1945 =====
Results of the 1945 parliamentary election held on 17 and 18 March 1945:

| Party | | Party | | | Electoral Alliance | | |
| Party | | Votes | % | Seats | Votes | % | Seats |
|---|---|---|---|---|---|---|---|
| Finnish People's Democratic League | SKDL | 83,478 | 25.79% | 9 | 84,343 | 26.06% | 9 |
| Small Farmers Party | | 865 | 0.27% | 0 | 84,343 | 26.06% | 9 |
| Swedish People's Party of Finland | SFP | 67,978 | 21.00% | 6 | 74,888 | 23.14% | 7 |
| Swedish Left | SV | 6,910 | 2.14% | 1 | 74,888 | 23.14% | 7 |
| Social Democratic Party of Finland | SDP | 73,335 | 22.66% | 7 | 73,335 | 22.66% | 7 |
| National Coalition Party | Kok | 47,558 | 14.69% | 5 | 61,572 | 19.02% | 6 |
| Agrarian Party | ML | 14,014 | 4.33% | 1 | 61,572 | 19.02% | 6 |
| National Progressive Party | KE | 27,689 | 8.56% | 2 | 27,689 | 8.56% | 2 |
| Radical People's Party | | 1,623 | 0.50% | 0 | 1,623 | 0.50% | 0 |
| Write-in lists | | 195 | 0.06% | 0 | 195 | 0.06% | 0 |
| Valid votes | | 323,645 | 100.00% | 31 | 323,645 | 100.00% | 31 |
| Rejected votes | | 2,248 | 0.69% | | | | |
| Total polled | | 325,893 | 81.47% | | | | |
| Registered electors | | 400,030 | | | | | |

The following candidates were elected: Gunnar Andersson (SDP); Karl-August Fagerholm (SDP); C. O. Frietsch (SFP); Lassi Hiekkala (KE); Kosti Kankainen (Kok); Kalle Kauppi (KE); Sylvi-Kyllikki Kilpi (SDP); Hertta Kuusinen (SKDL); J. E. Lampinen (ML); Jussi Lappi-Seppälä (Kok); Erkki Leikola (Kok); Väinö Leskinen (SDP); Nils Meinander (SFP); Ebba Östenson (SFP); John Österholm (SFP); Arvo Paasivuori (SDP); Eino Pekkala (SKDL); Ville Pessi (SKDL); Kaisu-Mirjami Rydberg (SKDL); Mauri Ryömä (SKDL); Martta Salmela-Järvinen (SDP); Arvo Salminen (Kok); Maximilian Sergelius (SV); Cay Sundström (SKDL); J. O. Söderhjelm (SFP); Konsta Talvio (SKDL); Tyyne Tuominen (SKDL); Aaro Uusitalo (SKDL); Teuvo Valanne (Kok); Ernst von Born (SFP); and Atos Wirtanen (SDP).

==== 1930s ====
===== 1939 =====
Results of the 1939 parliamentary election held on 1 and 2 July 1939:

| Party | | Party | | | Electoral Alliance | | |
| Party | | Votes | % | Seats | Votes | % | Seats |
|---|---|---|---|---|---|---|---|
| Social Democratic Party of Finland | SDP | 102,340 | 44.37% | 15 | 102,340 | 44.37% | 15 |
| Swedish People's Party of Finland | SFP | 61,063 | 26.48% | 8 | 61,063 | 26.48% | 8 |
| National Coalition Party | Kok | 27,077 | 11.74% | 3 | 27,077 | 11.74% | 3 |
| National Progressive Party | KE | 16,487 | 7.15% | 2 | 23,001 | 9.97% | 3 |
| Agrarian Party | ML | 6,514 | 2.82% | 1 | 23,001 | 9.97% | 3 |
| Patriotic People's Movement | IKL | 10,209 | 4.43% | 1 | 10,209 | 4.43% | 1 |
| Swedish Left | SV | 5,474 | 2.37% | 0 | 5,474 | 2.37% | 0 |
| Party of Smallholders and Rural People | PMP | 1,325 | 0.57% | 0 | 1,325 | 0.57% | 0 |
| Others | | 142 | 0.06% | 0 | 142 | 0.06% | 0 |
| Valid votes | | 230,631 | 100.00% | 30 | 230,631 | 100.00% | 30 |
| Rejected votes | | 1,171 | 0.51% | | | | |
| Total polled | | 231,802 | 68.05% | | | | |
| Registered electors | | 340,614 | | | | | |

The following candidates were elected: Mikko Ampuja (SDP); Gunnar Andersson (SDP); Elsa Bonsdorff (SFP); Aimo Cajander (KE); C. O. Frietsch (SFP); Ragnar Furuhjelm (SFP); Mandi Hannula (KE); Uno Hildén (SFP); Anni Huotari (SDP); R. G. Kallia (IKL); Sylvi-Kyllikki Kilpi (SDP); Henrik Kullberg (SFP); August Kuusisto (SDP); J. E. Lampinen (ML); Aleksi Lehtonen (SDP); Edwin Linkomies (Kok); Jalmari Linna (SDP); Ebba Östenson (SFP); John Österholm (SFP); Jalmari Pilkama (Kok); Kaisu-Mirjami Rydberg (SDP); Martta Salmela-Järvinen (SDP); Väinö Salovaara (SDP); Cay Sundström (SDP); August Syrjänen (SDP); Matti Turkia (SDP); Paavo Virkkunen (Kok); Ernst von Born (SFP); Karl Wiik (SDP); and Atos Wirtanen (SDP).

===== 1936 =====
Results of the 1936 parliamentary election held on 1 and 2 July 1936:

| Party | | Votes | % | Seats |
|---|---|---|---|---|
| Social Democratic Party of Finland | SDP | 87,657 | 42.14% | 12 |
| Swedish People's Party of Finland | SFP | 65,877 | 31.67% | 9 |
| National Coalition Party | Kok | 18,334 | 8.81% | 2 |
| National Progressive Party | KE | 16,530 | 7.95% | 2 |
| Patriotic People's Movement | IKL | 11,629 | 5.59% | 1 |
| Agrarian Party | ML | 6,866 | 3.30% | 0 |
| Small Farmers' Party of Finland | SPP | 599 | 0.29% | 0 |
| Others | | 534 | 0.26% | 0 |
| Valid votes | | 208,026 | 100.00% | 26 |
| Rejected votes | | 715 | 0.34% | |
| Total polled | | 208,741 | 66.85% | |
| Registered electors | | 312,245 | | |

The following candidates were elected: Mikko Ampuja (SDP); Gunnar Andersson (SDP); Elsa Bonsdorff (SFP); Aimo Cajander (KE); C. O. Frietsch (SFP); Ragnar Furuhjelm (SFP); Mandi Hannula (KE); Uno Hildén (SFP); Anni Huotari (SDP); Sylvi-Kyllikki Kilpi (SDP); Henrik Kullberg (SFP); August Kuusisto (SDP); Edwin Linkomies (Kok); Jalmari Linna (SDP); John Österholm (SFP); Jalmari Pilkama (Kok); Hilja Riipinen (IKL); Hannes Ryömä (SDP); Mauri Ryömä (SDP); Maximilian Sergelius (SFP); August Syrjänen (SDP); Matti Turkia (SDP); Ernst von Born (SFP); Erik von Frenckell (SFP); Karl Wiik (SDP); and Atos Wirtanen (SDP).

===== 1933 =====
Results of the 1933 parliamentary election held on 1, 2 and 3 July 1933:

| Party | | Votes | % | Seats |
|---|---|---|---|---|
| Social Democratic Labour Party of Finland | SDTP | 77,031 | 40.23% | 11 |
| Swedish People's Party of Finland | SFP | 58,244 | 30.42% | 9 |
| National Coalition Party and Patriotic People's Movement | Kok-IKL | 24,292 | 12.69% | 3 |
| National Progressive Party | KE | 15,874 | 8.29% | 2 |
| Agrarian Party | ML | 7,121 | 3.72% | 1 |
| Working People | | 2,667 | 1.39% | 0 |
| Finnish People's Organisation | SKJ | 2,103 | 1.10% | 0 |
| Real Finns, Temperance People etc. | | 1,476 | 0.77% | 0 |
| Small Farmers' Party of Finland | SPP | 1,023 | 0.53% | 0 |
| National Socialist Union of Finland | SKSL | 791 | 0.41% | 0 |
| Working People, Peasants and Intellectuals | | 318 | 0.17% | 0 |
| Party of Finnish Labor | STP | 226 | 0.12% | 0 |
| Write-in lists | | 295 | 0.15% | 0 |
| Valid votes | | 191,461 | 100.00% | 26 |
| Rejected votes | | 807 | 0.42% | |
| Total polled | | 192,268 | 66.41% | |
| Registered electors | | 289,538 | | |

The following candidates were elected: Axel Åhlström (SDTP); Mikko Ampuja (SDTP); Gunnar Andersson (SDTP); Eljas Erkko (KE); Hjalmar Forstadius (Kok-IKL); Ragnar Furuhjelm (SFP); Anni Huotari (SDTP); Henrik Kullberg (SFP); August Kuusisto (SDTP); J. E. Lampinen (ML); Edwin Linkomies (Kok-IKL); Jalmari Linna (SDTP); Kuno Nyman (SFP); Ebba Östenson (SFP); John Österholm (SFP); Axel Palmgren (SFP); Hilja Riipinen (Kok-IKL); Eero Rydman (KE); Hannes Ryömä (SDTP); Maximilian Sergelius (SFP); Aatto Sirén (SDTP); August Syrjänen (SDTP); Matti Turkia (SDTP); Ernst von Born (SFP); Erik von Frenckell (SFP); and Karl Wiik (SDTP).

===== 1930 =====
Results of the 1930 parliamentary election held on 1 and 2 October 1930:

| Party | | Party | | | Electoral Alliance | | |
| Party | | Votes | % | Seats | Votes | % | Seats |
|---|---|---|---|---|---|---|---|
| Social Democratic Labour Party of Finland | SDTP | 68,547 | 36.80% | 10 | 68,547 | 36.80% | 10 |
| Swedish People's Party of Finland | SFP | 51,010 | 27.38% | 8 | 51,010 | 27.38% | 8 |
| National Coalition Party | Kok | 26,247 | 14.09% | 4 | 29,562 | 15.87% | 4 |
| Small groups of the Patriotic List | | 3,315 | 1.78% | 0 | 29,562 | 15.87% | 4 |
| National Progressive Party | KE | 13,931 | 7.48% | 2 | 13,931 | 7.48% | 2 |
| Swedish Left | SV | 9,271 | 4.98% | 1 | 9,271 | 4.98% | 1 |
| Agrarian Party | ML | 7,749 | 4.16% | 1 | 7,749 | 4.16% | 1 |
| Socialist Electoral Organisation of Workers and Smallholders | STPV | 4,940 | 2.65% | 0 | 4,940 | 2.65% | 0 |
| Small Farmers' Party of Finland | SPP | 1,048 | 0.56% | 0 | 1,048 | 0.56% | 0 |
| Write-in lists | | 220 | 0.12% | 0 | 220 | 0.12% | 0 |
| Valid votes | | 186,278 | 100.00% | 26 | 186,278 | 100.00% | 26 |
| Rejected votes | | 666 | 0.36% | | | | |
| Total polled | | 186,944 | 68.92% | | | | |
| Registered electors | | 271,246 | | | | | |

The following candidates were elected: Artturi Aalto (SDTP); Axel Åhlström (SDTP); Mikko Ampuja (SDTP); Karl-August Fagerholm (SDTP); Hjalmar Forstadius (Kok); Ragnar Furuhjelm (SFP); Uno Hildén (SFP); Jalmari Jyske (KE); August Kuusisto (SDTP); J. E. Lampinen (ML); Jalmari Linna (SDTP); Kuno Nyman (SFP); John Österholm (SFP); B. H. Päivänsalo (Kok); Axel Palmgren (SFP); Hilja Riipinen (Kok); Hannes Ryömä (SDTP); Emil Sallila (SDTP); Hilda Seppälä (SDTP); Maximilian Sergelius (SV); Kaarlo Juho Ståhlberg (KE); Pehr Evind Svinhufvud (Kok); Matti Turkia (SDTP); Ernst von Born (SFP); Erik von Frenckell (SFP); and Wilhelm Westman (SFP).

==== 1920s ====
===== 1929 =====
Results of the 1929 parliamentary election held on 1 and 2 July 1929:

| Party | | Votes | % | Seats |
|---|---|---|---|---|
| Swedish People's Party of Finland | SFP | 52,440 | 36.09% | 10 |
| Social Democratic Labour Party of Finland | SDTP | 39,875 | 27.44% | 7 |
| National Coalition Party | Kok | 18,029 | 12.41% | 3 |
| Socialist Electoral Organisation of Workers and Smallholders | STPV | 17,996 | 12.39% | 3 |
| National Progressive Party | KE | 10,190 | 7.01% | 2 |
| Agrarian Party | ML | 5,884 | 4.05% | 1 |
| Small Farmers' Party of Finland | SPP | 562 | 0.39% | 0 |
| Write-in lists | | 320 | 0.22% | 0 |
| Valid votes | | 145,296 | 100.00% | 26 |
| Rejected votes | | 535 | 0.37% | |
| Total polled | | 145,831 | 56.86% | |
| Registered electors | | 256,462 | | |

The following candidates were elected: Artturi Aalto (SDTP); Axel Åhlström (SDTP); Mikko Ampuja (SDTP); Ilmari Auer (ML); Ragnar Furuhjelm (SFP); Mandi Hannula (KE); Kyösti Järvinen (Kok); Väinö Kivi (Kok); Henrik Kullberg (SFP); Arvo Lehto (STPV); Gustaf Lindberg (SFP); Jalmari Linna (SDTP); John Österholm (SFP); B. H. Päivänsalo (Kok); Axel Palmgren (SFP); Eino Pekkala (STPV); Carl Sanmark (SFP); Georg Schauman (SFP); Hilda Seppälä (SDTP); Maximilian Sergelius (SFP); Aatto Sirén (SDTP); Leander Sirola (SDTP); Konsta Talvio (STPV); Juho Vennola (KE); Ernst von Born (SFP); and Erik von Frenckell (SFP).

===== 1927 =====
Results of the 1927 parliamentary election held on 1 and 2 July 1927:

| Party | | Votes | % | Seats |
|---|---|---|---|---|
| Swedish People's Party of Finland | SFP | 52,507 | 36.06% | 10 |
| Social Democratic Labour Party of Finland | SDTP | 39,612 | 27.20% | 7 |
| National Coalition Party | Kok | 20,517 | 14.09% | 4 |
| Socialist Electoral Organisation of Workers and Smallholders | STPV | 18,434 | 12.66% | 3 |
| National Progressive Party | KE | 9,991 | 6.86% | 2 |
| Agrarian Party | ML | 4,335 | 2.98% | 0 |
| Write-in lists | | 223 | 0.15% | 0 |
| Valid votes | | 145,619 | 100.00% | 26 |
| Rejected votes | | 629 | 0.43% | |
| Total polled | | 146,248 | 60.14% | |
| Registered electors | | 243,162 | | |

The following candidates were elected: Artturi Aalto (SDTP); Mikko Ampuja (SDTP); Annie Furuhjelm (SFP); Ragnar Furuhjelm (SFP); Hedvig Gebhard (Kok); Lauri Ingman (Kok); August Isaksson (STPV); Rieti Itkonen (SDTP); Kyösti Järvinen (Kok); Henrik Kullberg (SFP); August Kuusisto (SDTP); Emil Lehtinen (Kok); Martta Kurkilahti (STPV); Gustaf Lindberg (SFP); Jalmari Linna (SDTP); John Österholm (SFP); Axel Palmgren (SFP); Eino Pekkala (STPV); Eero Rydman (KE); Georg Schauman (SFP); Hilda Seppälä (SDTP); Maximilian Sergelius (SFP); Taavi Tainio (SDTP); Juho Vennola (KE); Ernst von Born (SFP); and Erik von Frenckell (SFP).

===== 1924 =====
Results of the 1924 parliamentary election held on 1 and 2 April 1924:

| Party | | Party | | | Electoral Alliance | | |
| Party | | Votes | % | Seats | Votes | % | Seats |
|---|---|---|---|---|---|---|---|
| Swedish People's Party of Finland | SFP | 51,661 | 36.63% | 9 | 51,661 | 36.63% | 9 |
| Social Democratic Labour Party of Finland | SDTP | 39,088 | 27.72% | 7 | 39,088 | 27.72% | 7 |
| National Coalition Party | Kok | 20,872 | 14.80% | 4 | 20,872 | 14.80% | 4 |
| Socialist Electoral Organisation of Workers and Smallholders | STPV | 16,017 | 11.36% | 3 | 16,017 | 11.36% | 3 |
| National Progressive Party | KE | 10,346 | 7.34% | 2 | 13,266 | 9.41% | 2 |
| Agrarian Party | ML | 2,920 | 2.07% | 0 | 13,266 | 9.41% | 2 |
| Write-in lists | | 115 | 0.08% | 0 | 115 | 0.08% | 0 |
| Valid votes | | 141,019 | 100.00% | 25 | 141,019 | 100.00% | 25 |
| Rejected votes | | 600 | 0.42% | | | | |
| Total polled | | 141,619 | 62.19% | | | | |
| Registered electors | | 227,704 | | | | | |

The following candidates were elected: Artturi Aalto (SDTP); Aleksander Allila (STPV)); Mikko Ampuja (SDTP); Ilmari Auer (KE); Ragnar Furuhjelm (SFP); Hedvig Gebhard (Kok); Artturi Hiidenheimo (Kok); Eirik Hornborg (SFP); Kyösti Järvinen (Kok); Edvard Jokela (STPV); Erkki Kaila (Kok); Manu Kontula (SDTP); Gustaf Lindberg (SFP); Uno Nurminen (STPV); John Österholm (SFP); Axel Palmgren (SFP); Hjalmar J. Procopé (SFP); Hannes Ryömä (SDTP); Georg Schauman (SFP); Hilda Seppälä (SDTP); Leander Sirola (SDTP); Juho Vennola (KE); Ernst von Born (SFP); Karl Wiik (SDTP); and Rolf Witting (SFP).

===== 1922 =====
Results of the 1922 parliamentary election held on 1, 2 and 3 July 1922:

| Party | | Votes | % | Seats |
|---|---|---|---|---|
| Swedish People's Party of Finland | SFP | 52,551 | 37.33% | 10 |
| Social Democratic Labour Party of Finland | SDTP | 30,160 | 21.43% | 6 |
| Socialist Workers' Party of Finland | SSTP | 25,915 | 18.41% | 5 |
| National Coalition Party | Kok | 19,540 | 13.88% | 3 |
| National Progressive Party | KE | 9,534 | 6.77% | 1 |
| Agrarian Party | ML | 2,921 | 2.08% | 0 |
| Write-in lists | | 142 | 0.10% | 0 |
| Valid votes | | 140,763 | 100.00% | 25 |
| Rejected votes | | 676 | 0.48% | |
| Total polled | | 141,439 | 65.46% | |
| Registered electors | | 216,053 | | |

The following candidates were elected: (Note: Discrepancy in sources as to the number of Social Democratic Labour Party of Finland candidates elected from Uusimaa at the 1922 parliamentary election. Suomen virallinen tilasto XXIX A:10 shows six SDTP candidates elected but the Parliament of Finland website shows seven (Artturi Aalto, Mikko Ampuja, Väinö Hakkila, Anni Huotari, Emil Sallila, Hilda Seppälä and Karl Wiik).) Artturi Aalto (SDTP); Mikko Ampuja (SDTP); Elin Fagerholm (SSTP); Annie Furuhjelm (SFP); Ragnar Furuhjelm (SFP); Väinö Hakkila (SDTP); Artturi Hiidenheimo (Kok); Anni Huotari (SDTP); Kyösti Järvinen (Kok); Erkki Kaila (Kok); Albert Kallio (SSTP); Kalle Kankari (SSTP); Toivo Hjalmar Långström (SSTP); Gunnar Landtman (SFP); Julius Lindberg (SFP); Gustaf Mickels (SFP); John Österholm (SFP); Emil Sallila (SDTP); Frans Sandblom (SFP); Georg Schauman (SFP); Hilda Seppälä (SDTP); Matti Väisänen (SSTP); Juho Vennola (KE); Ernst von Born (SFP); Ferdinand von Wright (SFP); and Karl Wiik (SDTP).

==== 1910s ====
===== 1919 =====
Results of the 1919 parliamentary election held on 1, 2 and 3 March 1919:

| Party | | Party | | | Electoral Alliance | | |
| Party | | Votes | % | Seats | Votes | % | Seats |
|---|---|---|---|---|---|---|---|
| Swedish People's Party of Finland | SFP | 56,087 | 38.62% | 10 | 56,087 | 38.62% | 10 |
| Social Democratic Labour Party of Finland | SDTP | 54,681 | 37.65% | 10 | 54,681 | 37.65% | 10 |
| National Coalition Party | Kok | 19,153 | 13.19% | 3 | 19,153 | 13.19% | 3 |
| National Progressive Party | KE | 12,691 | 8.74% | 2 | 15,061 | 10.37% | 2 |
| Agrarian Party | ML | 1,545 | 1.06% | 0 | 15,061 | 10.37% | 2 |
| Christian Workers' Union of Finland | KrTL | 825 | 0.57% | 0 | 15,061 | 10.37% | 2 |
| Write-in lists | | 241 | 0.17% | 0 | 241 | 0.17% | 0 |
| Valid votes | | 145,223 | 100.00% | 25 | 145,223 | 100.00% | 25 |
| Rejected votes | | 623 | 0.43% | | | | |
| Total polled | | 145,846 | 71.26% | | | | |
| Registered electors | | 204,678 | | | | | |

The following candidates were elected: Artturi Aalto (SDTP); Arthur af Forselles (SFP); Mikko Ampuja (SDTP); Ilmari Auer (KE); Annie Furuhjelm (SFP); Ragnar Furuhjelm (SFP); Hedvig Gebhard (Kok); Väinö Hakkila (SDTP); Aatu Halme (SDTP); Kaarlo Heinonen (SDTP); Edvard Helle (SDTP); Artturi Hiidenheimo (Kok); Leo Hildén (SDTP); Eirik Hornborg (SFP); Väinö Hupli (SDTP); Erkki Kaila (Kok); Emil Leino (SDTP); John Österholm (SFP); Axel Palmgren (SFP); Hjalmar J. Procopé (SFP); August Ramsay (SFP); Georg Schauman (SFP); Leander Sirola (SDTP); Juho Vennola (KE); and Ernst von Born (SFP).

===== 1917 =====
Results of the 1917 parliamentary election held on 1 and 2 October 1917:

| Party | | Votes | % | Seats |
|---|---|---|---|---|
| Social Democratic Party of Finland | SDP | 68,241 | 47.04% | 12 |
| Swedish People's Party of Finland | SFP | 47,144 | 32.50% | 8 |
| United Finnish Parties (Finnish Party, Young Finnish Party and People's Party) | SP-NP-KP | 27,815 | 19.17% | 5 |
| Christian Workers' Union of Finland | KrTL | 1,682 | 1.16% | 0 |
| Write-in lists | | 191 | 0.13% | 0 |
| Valid votes | | 145,073 | 100.00% | 25 |
| Rejected votes | | 699 | 0.48% | |
| Total polled | | 145,772 | 73.05% | |
| Registered electors | | 199,546 | | |

The following candidates were elected: Otto Åkesson (SFP); Eero Erkko (SP-NP-KP); Annie Furuhjelm (SFP); Ragnar Furuhjelm (SFP); Edvard Valpas Hänninen (SDP); Eirik Hornborg (SFP); Herman Hurmevaara (SDP); Georg W. Johansson (SDP); Erkki Kaila (SP-NP-KP); Teuvo Kaitila (SP-NP-KP); Aura Kiiskinen (SDP); Jussi Kujala (SDP); Otto Wille Kuusinen (SDP); Jukka Lehtosaari (SDP); Oskari Wilho Louhivuori (SP-NP-KP); Kullervo Manner (SDP); Axel Palmgren (SFP); Gustaf Rosenqvist (SFP); Aatto Sirén (SDP); Yrjö Sirola (SDP); Arthur Usénius (SDP); Wäinö Valkama (SP-NP-KP); Jussi Vatanen (SDP); Eric von Rettig (SFP); and R. A. Wrede (SFP).

===== 1916 =====
Results of the 1916 parliamentary election held on 1 and 3 July 1916:

| Party | | Votes | % | Seats |
|---|---|---|---|---|
| Social Democratic Party of Finland | SDP | 55,725 | 47.52% | 12 |
| Swedish People's Party of Finland | SFP | 39,730 | 33.88% | 8 |
| Finnish Party | SP | 13,156 | 11.22% | 2 |
| Young Finnish Party | NP | 7,545 | 6.43% | 1 |
| Christian Workers' Union of Finland | KrTL | 1,003 | 0.86% | 0 |
| Write-in lists | | 105 | 0.09% | 0 |
| Valid votes | | 117,264 | 100.00% | 23 |
| Rejected votes | | 465 | 0.39% | |
| Total polled | | 117,729 | 59.67% | |
| Registered electors | | 197,316 | | |

The following candidates were elected: Leo Ehrnrooth (SFP); Eero Erkko (NP); Annie Furuhjelm (SFP); Onni Hallsten (SP); Edvard Valpas Hänninen (SDP); Pentti Hiidenheimo (SP); Vera Hjelt (SFP); Eirik Hornborg (SFP); Georg W. Johansson (SDP); Aura Kiiskinen (SDP); Jussi Kujala (SDP); Otto Wille Kuusinen (SDP); J. K. Lehtinen (SDP); Jukka Lehtosaari (SDP); J. H. Lumivuokko (SDP); Kullervo Manner (SDP); Gustaf Rosenqvist (SFP); Emil Schybergson (SFP); Aatto Sirén (SDP); Karl Söderholm (SFP); Julius Sundberg (SDP); Gunnar Takolander (SFP); and Jussi Vatanen (SDP).

===== 1913 =====
Results of the 1913 parliamentary election held on 1 and 2 August 1913:

| Party | | Votes | % | Seats |
|---|---|---|---|---|
| Social Democratic Party of Finland | SDP | 42,591 | 41.07% | 10 |
| Swedish People's Party of Finland | SFP | 40,308 | 38.86% | 9 |
| Finnish Party | SP | 14,332 | 13.82% | 3 |
| Young Finnish Party | NP | 5,986 | 5.77% | 1 |
| Others | | 498 | 0.48% | 0 |
| Valid votes | | 103,715 | 100.00% | 23 |
| Rejected votes | | 413 | 0.40% | |
| Total polled | | 104,128 | 56.81% | |
| Registered electors | | 183,302 | | |

The following candidates were elected: Adolf Bredenberg (SFP); Eero Erkko (NP); Annie Furuhjelm (SFP); Onni Hallsten (SP); Edvard Valpas Hänninen (SDP); Pentti Hiidenheimo (SP); Vera Hjelt (SFP); Aura Kiiskinen (SDP); Jussi Kujala (SDP); J. H. Lumivuokko (SDP); William Lundström (SDP); Oskari Lylykorpi (SDP); Kullervo Manner (SDP); Jussi Railo (SDP); Gustaf Rosenqvist (SFP); Emil Schybergson (SFP); Gustaf Storgårds (SFP); Johan Strömberg (SFP); Gunnar Takolander (SFP); Adolf Törngren (SFP); Wäinö Valkama (SP); August Vatanen (SDP); and Karl Wiik (SDP).

===== 1911 =====
Results of the 1911 parliamentary election held on 2 and 3 January 1911:

| Party | | Votes | % | Seats |
|---|---|---|---|---|
| Swedish People's Party of Finland | SFP | 45,593 | 42.27% | 10 |
| Social Democratic Party of Finland | SDP | 39,475 | 36.60% | 9 |
| Finnish Party | SP | 15,355 | 14.24% | 3 |
| Young Finnish Party | NP | 6,083 | 5.64% | 1 |
| Christian Workers' Union of Finland | KrTL | 1,287 | 1.19% | 0 |
| Write-in lists | | 71 | 0.07% | 0 |
| Valid votes | | 107,864 | 100.00% | 23 |
| Rejected votes | | 314 | 0.29% | |
| Total polled | | 108,178 | 62.84% | |
| Registered electors | | 172,157 | | |

The following candidates were elected: Werner Aro (SDP); Eero Erkko (NP); Onni Hallsten (SP); Edvard Valpas Hänninen (SDP); Vera Hjelt (SFP); Otto Wille Kuusinen (SDP); Oskari Laine (SP); Uno Lindelöf (SFP); William Lundström (SDP); Oskari Lylykorpi (SDP); Kullervo Manner (SDP); Leo Mechelin (SFP); Juho Mynttinen (SP); August Nybergh (SFP); Valfrid Perttilä (SDP); Gustaf Rosenqvist (SFP); Emil Schybergson (SFP); Aatto Sirén (SDP); Karl Söderholm (SFP); Hedvig Sohlberg (SFP); Johan Strömberg (SFP); Karl Wiik (SDP); and R. A. Wrede (SFP).

===== 1910 =====
Results of the 1910 parliamentary election held on 1 and 2 February 1910:

| Party | | Votes | % | Seats |
|---|---|---|---|---|
| Swedish People's Party of Finland | SFP | 45,716 | 41.50% | 10 |
| Social Democratic Party of Finland | SDP | 40,307 | 36.59% | 9 |
| Finnish Party | SP | 15,463 | 14.04% | 3 |
| Young Finnish Party | NP | 6,786 | 6.16% | 1 |
| Christian Workers' Union of Finland | KrTL | 1,791 | 1.63% | 0 |
| Write-in lists | | 103 | 0.09% | 0 |
| Valid votes | | 110,166 | 100.00% | 23 |
| Rejected votes | | 351 | 0.32% | |
| Total polled | | 110,517 | 66.00% | |
| Registered electors | | 167,444 | | |

The following candidates were elected: Werner Aro (SDP); Eero Erkko (NP); Onni Hallsten (SP); Edvard Valpas Hänninen (SDP); Vera Hjelt (SFP); Otto Wille Kuusinen (SDP); Oskari Laine (SP); Uno Lindelöf (SFP); William Lundström (SDP); Oskari Lylykorpi (SDP); Kullervo Manner (SDP); Leo Mechelin (SFP); Juho Mynttinen (SP); August Nybergh (SFP); Valfrid Perttilä (SDP); Gustaf Rosenqvist (SFP); Emil Schybergson (SFP); Aatto Sirén (SDP); Karl Söderholm (SFP); Hedvig Sohlberg (SFP); Johan Strömberg (SFP); Karl Wiik (SDP); and R. A. Wrede (SFP).

==== 1900s ====
===== 1909 =====
Results of the 1909 parliamentary election held on 1 and 3 May 1909:

| Party | | Votes | % | Seats |
|---|---|---|---|---|
| Swedish People's Party of Finland | SFP | 43,123 | 39.62% | 9 |
| Social Democratic Party of Finland | SDP | 39,745 | 36.52% | 9 |
| Finnish Party | SP | 17,735 | 16.29% | 4 |
| Young Finnish Party | NP | 6,647 | 6.11% | 1 |
| Christian Workers' Union of Finland | KrTL | 1,336 | 1.23% | 0 |
| Others | | 255 | 0.23% | 0 |
| Valid votes | | 108,841 | 100.00% | 23 |
| Rejected votes | | 496 | 0.45% | |
| Total polled | | 109,337 | 67.08% | |
| Registered electors | | 163,004 | | |

The following candidates were elected: Werner Aro (SDP); Konrad Björkstén (SFP); Eero Erkko (NP); Onni Hallsten (SP); Edvard Valpas Hänninen (SDP); Edvard Helle (SDP); Vera Hjelt (SFP); Mårten Holmberg (SFP); Ivar Hörhammer (SDP); Axel Juselius (SFP); Hilda Käkikoski (SP); Otto Wille Kuusinen (SDP); Oskari Laine (SP); Uno Lindelöf (SFP); William Lundström (SDP); Oskari Lylykorpi (SDP); Juho Mynttinen (SP); Gustaf Rosenqvist (SFP); Miina Sillanpää (SDP); Aatto Sirén (SDP); Karl Söderholm (SFP); Hedvig Sohlberg (SFP); and Johan Strömberg (SFP).

===== 1908 =====
Results of the 1908 parliamentary election held on 1 and 2 July 1908:

| Party | | Votes | % | Seats |
|---|---|---|---|---|
| Swedish People's Party of Finland | SFP | 41,937 | 39.00% | 9 |
| Social Democratic Party of Finland | SDP | 39,687 | 36.91% | 9 |
| Finnish Party | SP | 18,199 | 16.93% | 4 |
| Young Finnish Party | NP | 6,296 | 5.86% | 1 |
| Christian Workers' Union of Finland | KrTL | 934 | 0.87% | 0 |
| Others | | 468 | 0.44% | 0 |
| Valid votes | | 107,521 | 100.00% | 23 |
| Rejected votes | | 743 | 0.69% | |
| Total polled | | 108,264 | 69.03% | |
| Registered electors | | 156,842 | | |

The following candidates were elected: Frans Ahlroos (SFP); Werner Aro (SDP); Leo Ehrnrooth (SFP); Eero Erkko (NP); Onni Hallsten (SP); Edvard Valpas Hänninen (SDP); Walter Heimbürger (SFP); Vera Hjelt (SFP); Georg W. Johansson (SDP); Hilda Käkikoski (SP); Otto Wille Kuusinen (SDP); Oskari Laine (SP); William Lundström (SDP); Oskari Lylykorpi (SDP); Valfrid Perttilä (SDP); Vilho Reima (SP); Gustaf Rosenqvist (SFP); Emil Schybergson (SFP); Miina Sillanpää (SDP); Aatto Sirén (SDP); Karl Söderholm (SFP); Hedvig Sohlberg (SFP); and Kristian von Alfthan (SFP).

===== 1907 =====
Results of the 1907 parliamentary election held on 15 and 16 March 1907:

| Party | | Votes | % | Seats |
|---|---|---|---|---|
| Swedish People's Party of Finland | SFP | 44,544 | 37.93% | 9 |
| Social Democratic Party of Finland | SDP | 40,951 | 34.87% | 9 |
| Finnish Party | SP | 20,402 | 17.37% | 4 |
| Young Finnish Party | NP | 6,521 | 5.55% | 1 |
| Others | | 5,008 | 4.26% | 0 |
| Valid votes | | 117,426 | 100.00% | 23 |
| Rejected votes | | 688 | 0.58% | |
| Total polled | | 118,114 | 74.13% | |
| Registered electors | | 159,336 | | |

The following candidates were elected: Frans Ahlroos (SFP); Leo Ehrnrooth (SFP); Eero Erkko (NP); Fridolf Gustafsson (SFP); Edvard Valpas Hänninen (SDP); Edvard Helle (SDP); Albert Ingman (SDP); Oscar Johansson (SDP); Hilda Käkikoski (SP); Juho Laakso (SDP); Oskari Laine (SP); Karl Oljemark (SFP); E. G. Palmén (SP); Emil Perttilä (SDP); Valfrid Perttilä (SDP); Vilho Reima (SP); Gustaf Rosenqvist (SFP); Emil Schybergson (SFP); Miina Sillanpää (SDP); Aatto Sirén (SDP); Karl Söderholm (SFP); Kristian von Alfthan (SFP); and Osvald Wasastjerna (SFP).
