= Henrik Wickström =

Finnish politician (born 1994)

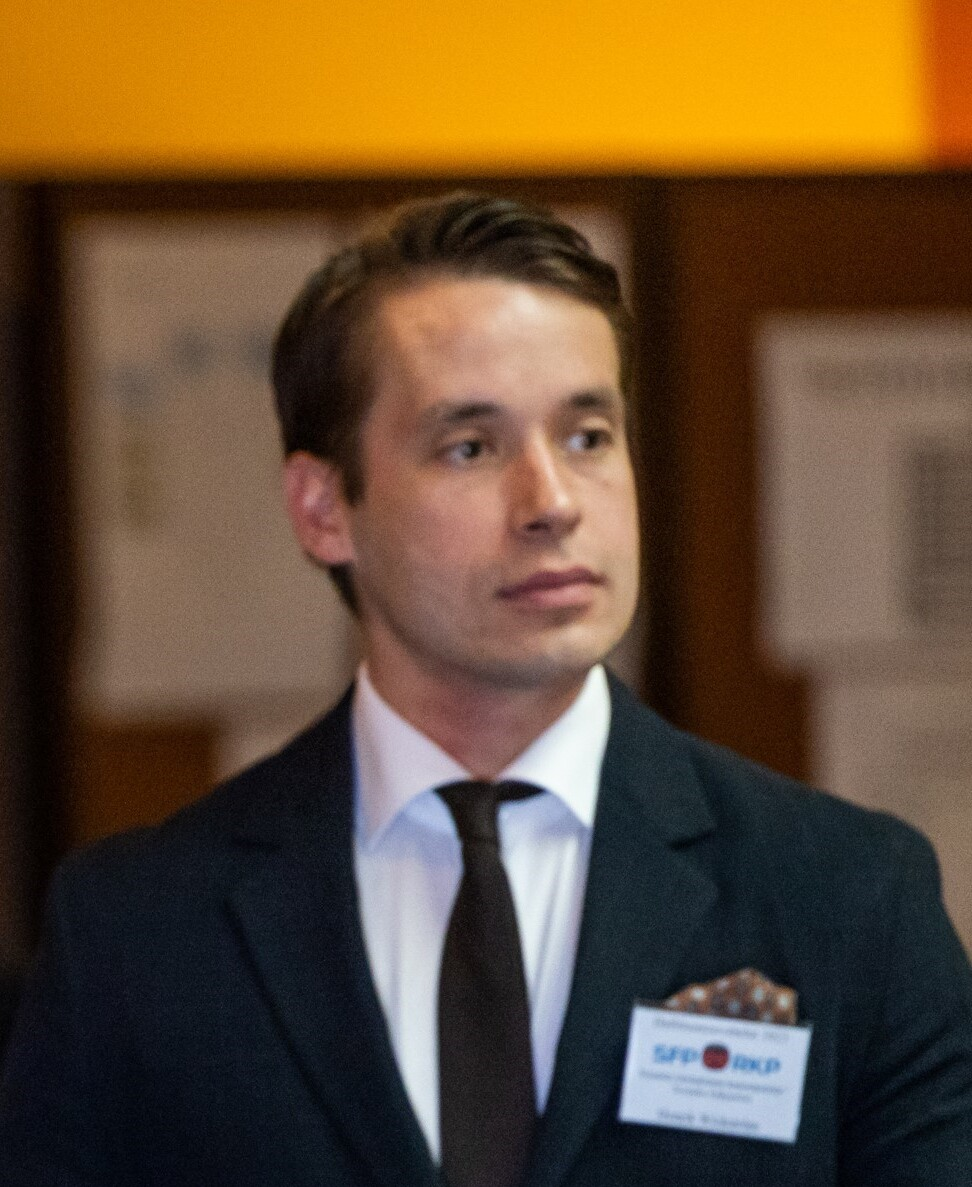
- Wickström in 2023

Member of the Parliament of Finland
- Incumbent
- Assumed office 5 April 2023
- Constituency: Uusimaa

Personal details
- Born: 16 September 1994 (age 31)
- Party: Swedish People's Party of Finland

Henrik Wickström (born 16 September 1994) is a Finnish politician serving as a member of the Parliament of Finland since 2023. He has served as chairman of the municipal board of Ingå since 2017.
