= Elsa Bonsdorff =

Finnish politician

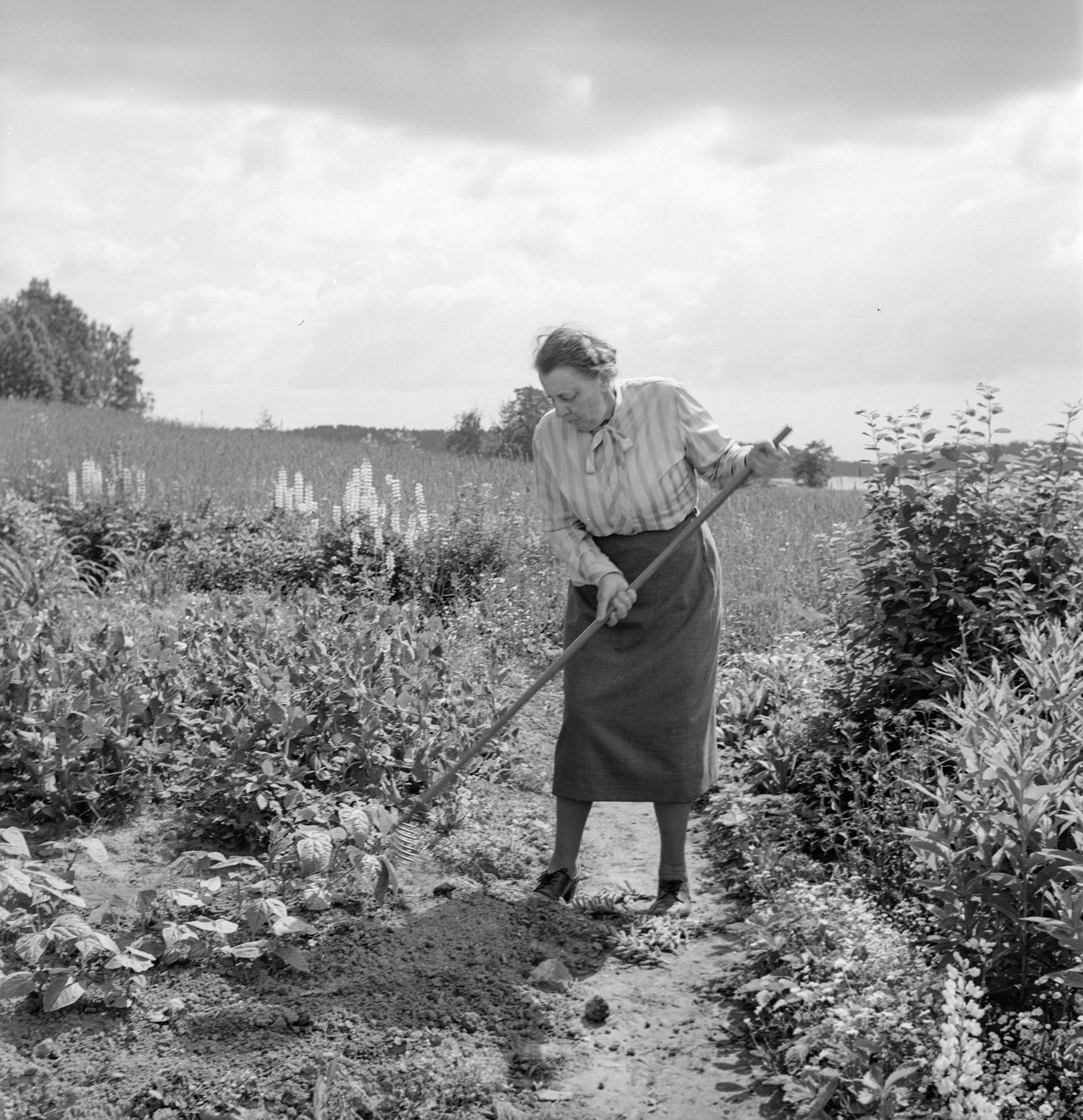
- Elsa Bonsdorff photographed gardening by Göran Schildt.

Member of the Finnish Parliament for Uusimaa
- In office 1 September 1936 – 5 April 1945
- Parliamentary group: Swedish People's Party

Personal details
- Born: Elsa Rosina Bonsdorff; 10 November 1883 Turku
- Died: 4 August 1973 (aged 89) Helsinki
- Party: Swedish People's Party

Elsa Rosina Bonsdorff; 10 November 1883, Turku – 4 August 1973, Helsinki) was a Finnish politician who served as a member of the Parliament of Finland for the Uusimaa constituency from 1936 to 1945, representing the Swedish People's Party of Finland (SFP).
