= Ebba Östenson =

Finnish politician

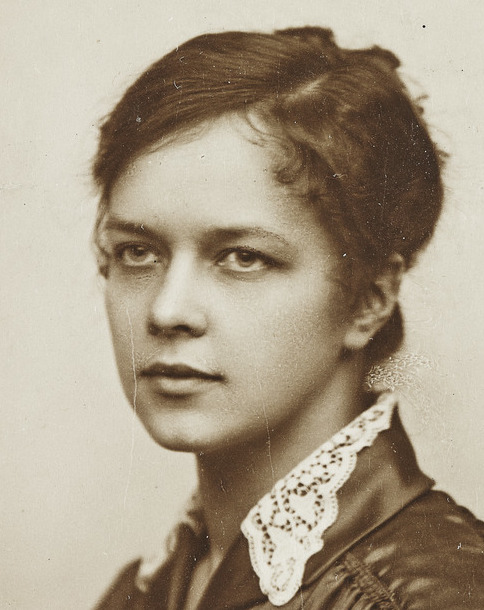
- Ebba von Bonsdorff in the 1910s.

Member of the Finnish Parliament for Uusimaa
- In office 1 September 1933 – 31 August 1936
- Parliamentary group: Swedish People's Party
- In office 1 September 1939 – 28 March 1954
- Parliamentary group: Swedish People's Party

Personal details
- Born: Ebba Hilda Maria von Bonsdorff; 27 May 1894 Tampere
- Died: 23 August 1988 (aged 94) Helsinki
- Party: Swedish People's Party

Ebba Hilda Maria Östenson (née von Bonsdorff; 27 May 1894, Tampere – 23 August 1988, Helsinki) was a Finnish politician who served as a member of the Parliament of Finland for the Uusimaa constituency from 1933 to 1936 and again from 1939 to 1954, representing the Swedish People's Party of Finland (SFP).
