= Pinja Perholehto =

Finnish politician (born 1997)

Member of the Parliament of Finland
- Incumbent
- Assumed office 5 April 2023
- Constituency: Uusimaa

Personal details
- Born: 1 March 1997 (age 29)
- Party: Social Democratic Party of Finland

Pinja Perholehto (born 1 March 1997) is a Finnish politician serving as a member of the Parliament of Finland since 2023. From 2020 to 2023, she served as chairwoman of the Social Democratic Youth.
