= Onni Rostila =

Finnish politician (born 1992)

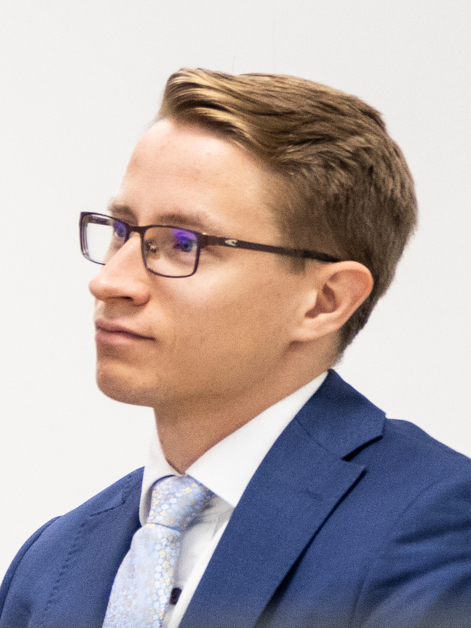
- Rostila in 2023

Member of the Parliament of Finland
- Incumbent
- Assumed office 5 April 2023
- Constituency: Uusimaa

Personal details
- Born: 8 April 1992 (age 34)
- Party: Finns Party

Onni Rostila (born 8 April 1992) is a Finnish politician serving as a member of the Parliament of Finland since 2023. He has been a municipal councillor of Hyvinkää since 2021.
