= William Lundström =

Finnish politician

Ernst William Lundström (22 February 1880 – 17 July 1915) was a Finnish printer and politician. He was born in Helsinki, and was a member of the Parliament of Finland from 1908 until his death in 1915, representing the Social Democratic Party of Finland (SDP).
