= Albert Ingman =

Finnish politician

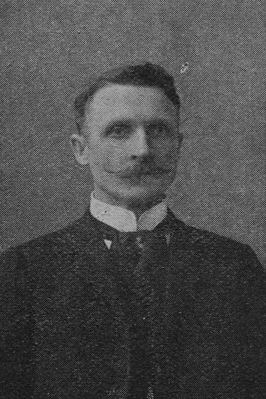

Albert Konstantin Ingman (11 March 1871, in Helsingin maalaiskunta – 28 December 1948) was a Finnish house painter and politician. He was a member of the Parliament of Finland from 1907 to 1908, representing the Social Democratic Party of Finland (SDP).
