= Vilho Reima =

Finnish schoolteacher and politician (1867–1948)

Vilho Reima (28 October 1867 – 28 February 1948; name until 1906 Wilhelm Reiman) was a Finnish schoolteacher and politician, born in Kymi. He was a member of the Parliament of Finland from 1907 to 1909, representing the Finnish Party.
