= August Syrjänen =

Finnish politician (1883–1956)

Kustaa August Syrjänen (5 December 1883 – 31 December 1956) was a Finnish schoolteacher and politician. He was a member of the Parliament of Finland from 1933 to 1945, representing the Social Democratic Party of Finland (SDP).
