= Wäinö Valkama =

Finnish schoolteacher, farmer, bank director and politician (1877–1948)

Wäinö Aleksis Valkama (17 July 1877 – 12 June 1948) was a Finnish schoolteacher, farmer, bank director and politician, born in Pusula. He was a member of the Parliament of Finland from 1913 to 1916 and from 1917 to 1919, representing the Finnish Party until December 1918 and the National Coalition Party after that. He was a presidential elector in the 1931 Finnish presidential election.
