= Eino Sirén =

Finnish lawyer and politician

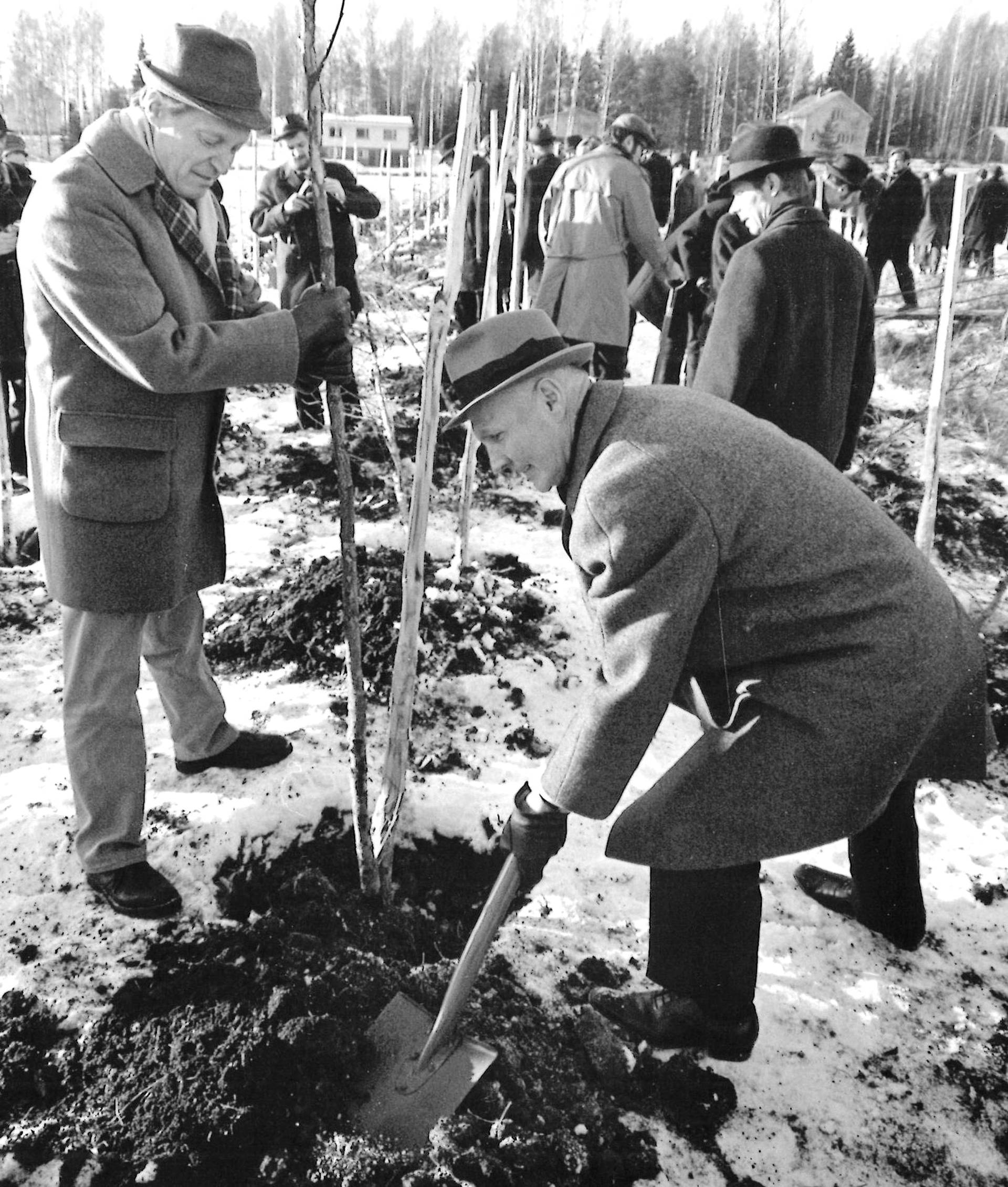
Kaarlo Pitsinki and Eino Sirén in 1970.

Eino Sirén (25 December 1909, Helsinki – 4 March 1981) was a Finnish lawyer and politician of the Social Democratic Party of Finland. He served as a member of the Parliament of Finland from 1962 to 1970 and as President of the Nordic Council in 1967.
