= Jussi Vatanen (politician) =

Finnish politician (1875–1936)

Johan (Jussi) Vatanen (15 January 1875, Eno – 1936, Kaluga) was a Finnish labourer and politician. He was a member of the Parliament of Finland from 1916 to 1918, representing the Social Democratic Party of Finland (SDP). During the Finnish Civil War he sided with the Reds and when the Finnish Socialist Workers' Republic collapsed, he fled to Soviet Russia. On 29 August 1918, he took part in the founding congress of the Communist Party of Finland (SKP) in Moscow. He worked as a party functionary, as a propagandist and as a teacher until 1935, when he retired. He died in 1936 in Kaluga.
