= Uno Hildén =

Finnish politician

Uno Alarik Hildén (4 April 1890, Ingå - 2 February 1951) was a Finnish agronomist, farmer and politician. He was a member of the Parliament of Finland from 1930 to 1933 and again from 1936 to 1945, representing the Swedish People's Party of Finland.
