= Bruno Sundman =

Finnish politician (1920–2002)

Bruno Johannes (Bruno J.) Sundman (7 September 1920 – 7 August 2002) was a Finnish politician, born in Karis. He was a member of the Parliament of Finland from 1951 to 1958, representing the Social Democratic Party of Finland (SDP). He was a presidential elector in the 1956 Finnish presidential election.
