= Unto Suominen =

Finnish politician (1911–1968)

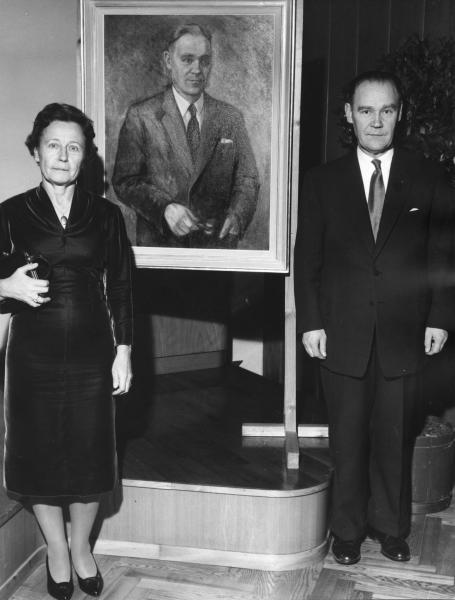
Unto Suominen with his wife (1961)

Unto Ilmari Suominen (1 July 1911 – 16 December 1968) was a Finnish politician, born in Lohja. He was a member of the Parliament of Finland from 1951 to 1958, representing the Social Democratic Party of Finland (SDP). He was a presidential elector in the 1956 Finnish presidential election.
