= Victor Procopé =

Finnish economist and politician (1918-1998)

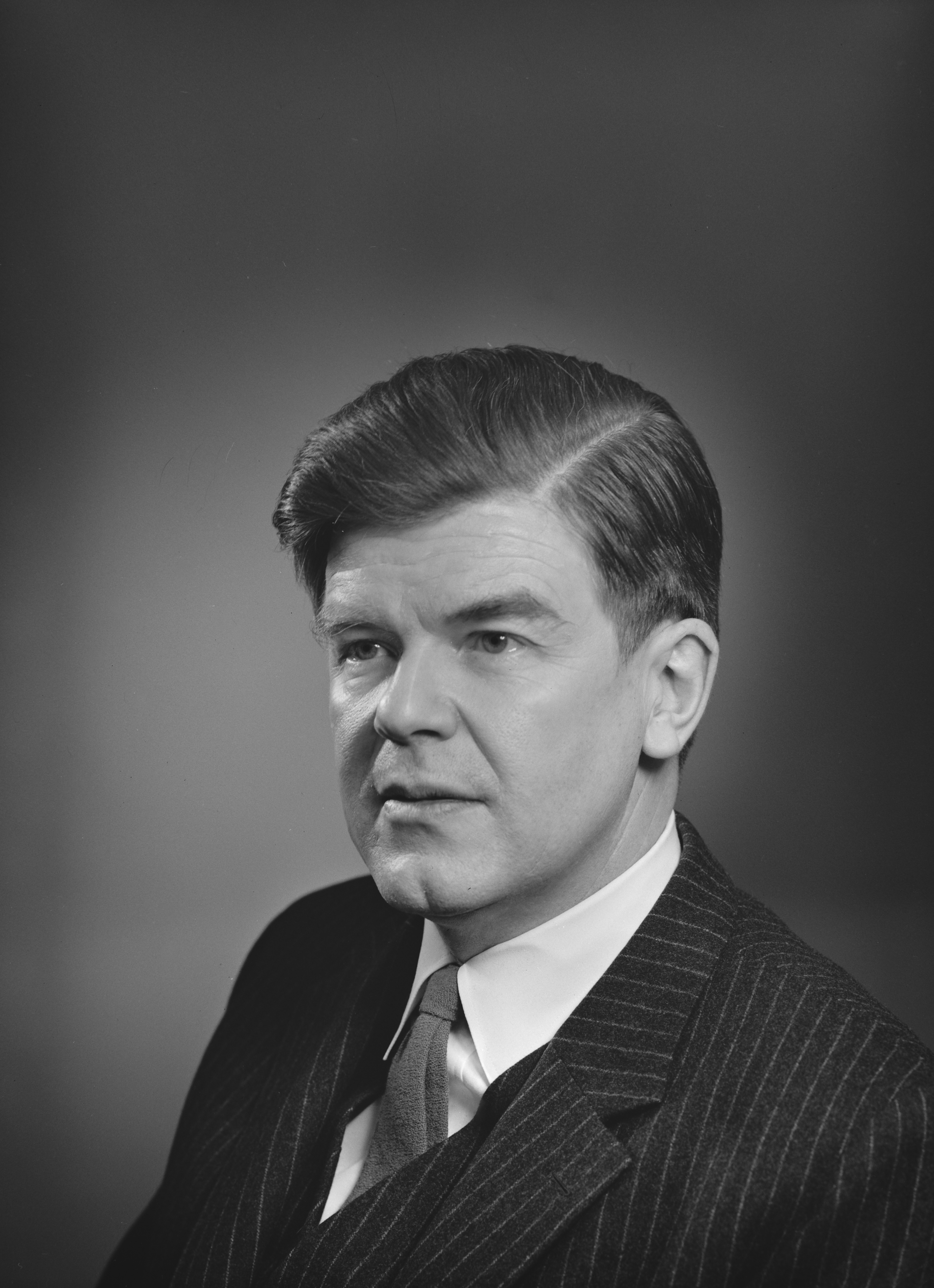
Victor Procopé in 1966

Johan Victor Procopé (20 February 1918 – 7 August 1998) was a Finnish economist and politician, born in Helsinki. He was a member of the Parliament of Finland from 1958 to 1962 and from 1966 to 1975, he represented the Swedish People's Party of Finland.
