= Kristian von Alfthan =

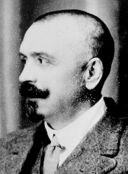
Kristian von Alfthan

Baron Kristian Axel von Alfthan (1 March 1864 – 13 March 1919) was a Finnish physician and politician, born in Oulu. He was a member of the Diet of Finland from 1894 to 1906 and of the Parliament of Finland from 1907 to 1909, representing the Swedish People's Party of Finland (SFP). He took part in the Finnish Civil War on the White side as a military physician.
