= Adolf Bredenberg =

Finnish politician

Gustaf Adolf Bredenberg (10 August 1865, Bromarf - 21 February 1955) was a Finnish agronomist and politician. He was a member of the Parliament of Finland from 1913 to 1916, representing the Swedish People's Party of Finland (SFP).
