= Gunnar Henriksson =

Finnish journalist and politician

Gunnar Vilhelm Henriksson
- Born: 22 August 1905; Helsinki
- Died: 13 February 1974 (aged 68)
- Occupations: Journalist, Politician

Gunnar Vilhelm Henriksson (22 August 1905, Helsinki – 13 February 1974) was a Finnish journalist (newspaper editor)and politician (senator). He was a member of the Parliament of Finland from 1948 to 1966, representing the Social Democratic Party of Finland (SDP). During the Continuation War, he was one of the signatories of the "Petition of the Thirty-Three", which members of the peace opposition presented to President Ryti on 20 August 1943.
