= Gustaf Rosenqvist =

Finnish politician

Georg Gustaf Alexander Rosenqvist (13 September 1855, Lapinjärvi - 12 February 1931) was a Finnish Lutheran clergyman, theologian and politician. He was a member of the Diet of Finland from 1904 to 1906 and of the Parliament of Finland from 1907 to 1919, representing the Swedish People's Party of Finland (SFP). He was the elder brother of Vilhelm Rosenqvist.
