= Ola Rosendahl =

Finnish politician

Ola Mikael Rosendahl (1 October 1939, in Pernå – 17 March 2008) was a Finnish agronomist, farmer and politician. He was a member of the Parliament of Finland from 1995 to 2003, representing the Swedish People's Party of Finland (SFP).
