= Werner Aro =

Finnish politician

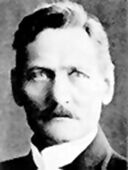
Werner Aro

Werner Aro (17 August 1873 - 24 November 1929; original surname Flink) was a Finnish tailor and politician, born in Hausjärvi. He was a member of the Parliament of Finland from 1908 to 1913, representing the Social Democratic Party of Finland (SDP). He was imprisoned from 1918 to 1920 for having sided with the Reds during the Finnish Civil War.
