= Johan Strömberg =

Finnish politician

Johannes (Johan) Strömberg (28 August 1868, in Lapinjärvi – 11 March 1952) was a Finnish farmer and politician. He was a member of the Parliament of Finland from 1909 to 1910 and again from 1911 to 1916, representing the Swedish People's Party of Finland (SFP).
