= August Kuusisto =

Finnish politician

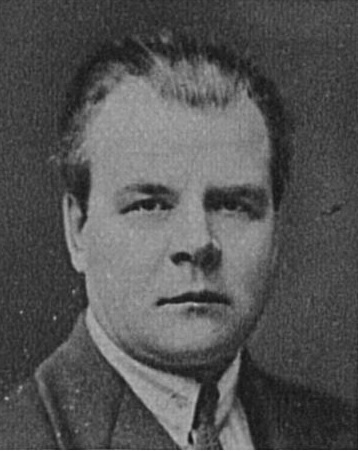
Kuusisto

August Kuusisto (18 December 1883, Puumala - 11 February 1972; surname until 1920 Kauranen) was a Finnish farmer and politician. He was a member of the Parliament of Finland from 1927 to 1929 and again from 1930 to 1945, representing the Social Democratic Party of Finland (SDP).
