= Same-sex marriage in Finland =

Same-sex marriage has been legal in Finland since 1 March 2017. A bill for the legalisation of same-sex marriages was approved by the Finnish Parliament in a vote of 101–90 on 12 December 2014, and signed into law by President Sauli Niinistö on 20 February 2015. Further legislation to harmonise other laws with the legalisation of same-sex marriage was passed in 2016. The laws took effect on 1 March 2017. Polling suggests that a majority of Finns support the legal recognition of same-sex marriage. Finland was the last Nordic sovereign state, the twelfth country in Europe and the twentieth in the world to allow same-sex couples to marry nationwide.

From 2002 until 2017, Finland recognized registered partnerships for same-sex couples, which provided the same rights and responsibilities as marriage with the exception of joint adoption rights and the right to a joint last name.

== Registered partnerships ==
=== Legislative action ===
Legislation introducing registered partnerships (Finnish: rekisteröity parisuhde, pronounced [ˈrekisterøi̯ty ˈpɑriˌsuhde]; Swedish: registrerat partnerskap, pronounced [re.jisˈtreːrɑt ˈpɑːrtnerskɑːp]) (Note: Northern Sami: registrerejuvvon párragaskavuohta, pronounced [ˈrekiːˌstreːreˌjuvvon ˈpʰaːrraˌkasːkaˌvuo̯hta]; Inari Sami: registeristum parâkoskâvuotâ; Skolt Sami: rekisterõsttum paarrkõskkvuõtt.) for same-sex couples was passed by the Parliament of Finland on 28 September 2001 with a vote of 99–84. The law went into effect on 1 March 2002. Registered partnerships, which were available only to same-sex couples, provided the same rights and responsibilities as marriage for opposite-sex couples, except for adoption rights and the ability to take a common family name, and they were registered and dissolved using a procedure similar to that for civil marriage. The legislation also granted immigration rights to a foreign partner.

28 September 2001 vote in the Parliament
| Party | Voted for | Voted against | Abstained | Absent (Did not vote) |
|---|---|---|---|---|
| G Social Democratic Party | 40: Jouni Backman; Tarja Filatov; Jukka Gustafsson; Tuula Haatainen; Klaus Hellberg; Rakel Hiltunen; Susanna Huovinen; Liisa Jaakonsaari; Ulla Juurola; Reijo Kallio; Antti Kalliomäki; Ilkka Kanerva; Saara Karhu; Tarja Kautto; Antero Kekkonen; Kimmo Kiljunen; Johannes Koskinen; Marjaana Koskinen; Paavo Lipponen; Leena Luhtanen; Jukka Mikkola; Sinikka Mönkäre; Kalevi Olin; Heli Paasio; Pirkko Peltomo; Riitta Prusti; Virpa Puisto; Susanna Rahkonen; Kari Rajamäki; Jussi Ranta; Tero Rönni; Matti Saarinen; Jouko Skinnari; Säde Tahvanainen; Ilkka Taipale; Erkki Tuomioja; Kari Urpilainen; Matti Vähänäkki; Marjatta Vehkaoja; Pia Viitanen | 9: Lauri Kähkönen; Tapio Karjalainen; Risto Kuisma; Esa Lahtela; Reijo Laitinen; Raimo Mähönen; Arto Seppälä; Marja-Liisa Tykkyläinen; Harry Wallin | 1: Valto Koski | 2: Mikko Elo; Maija Rask |
| Centre Party | 10: Tytti Isohookana-Asunmaa; Anneli Jäätteenmäki; Tanja Karpela; Mari Kiviniemi; Katri Komi; Paula Lehtomäki; Osmo Puhakka; Markku Rossi; Matti Vanhanen; Anu Vehviläinen | 34: Esko Aho; Hannu Aho; Olavi Ala-Nissilä; Sirkka-Liisa Anttila; Liisa Hyssälä; Seppo Kääriäinen; Timo Kalli; Kyösti Karjula; Niilo Keränen; Inkeri Kerola; Timo Korva; Seppo Lahtela; Eero Lämsä; Markku Laukkanen; Jari Leppä; Johannes Leppänen; Mika Lintilä; Hannes Manninen; Tero Mölsä; Kari Myllyniemi; Petri Neittaanmäki; Pekka Nousiainen; Lauri Oinonen; Mauri Pekkarinen; Aulis Ranta-Muotio; Antti Rantakangas; Juha Rehula; Pauli Saapunki; Mauri Salo; Hannu Takkula; Matti Väistö; Jukka Vihriälä; Pekka Vilkuna; Jaana Ylä-Mononen | – | 3: Maria Kaisa Aula; Juha Korkeaoja; Mirja Ryynänen |
| G National Coalition Party | 15: Pirjo-Riitta Antvuori; Leena Harkimo; Ville Itälä; Marjukka Karttunen; Jyrki Katainen; Suvi Lindén; Markku Markkula; Sauli Niinistö; Maija Perho; Sirpa Pietikäinen; Kirsi Piha; Sari Sarkomaa; Marja Tiura; Jari Vilén; Ben Zyskowicz | 22: Eero Akaan-Penttilä; Jyri Häkämies; Pertti Hemmilä; Timo Ihamäki; Seppo Kanerva; Kari Kantalainen; Juha Karpio; Paula Kokkonen; Riitta Korhonen; Kalervo Kummola; Pekka Kuosmanen; Esko Kurvinen; Jouni Lehtimäki; Pertti Mäki-Hakola; Olli Nepponen; Tuija Nurmi; Pekka Ravi; Petri Salo; Timo Seppälä; Juhani Sjöblom; Irja Tulonen; Raija Vahasalo | – | 8: Kaarina Dromberg; Olli-Pekka Heinonen; Ilkka Kanerva; Jari Koskinen; Hanna Markkula-Kivisilta; Kimmo Sasi; Martti Tiuri; Lasse Virén |
| G Left Alliance | 14: Esko Helle; Anne Huotari; Matti Huutola; Martti Korhonen; Mikko Kuoppa; Annika Lapintie; Outi Ojala; Iivo Polvi; Suvi-Anne Siimes; Marjatta Stenius-Kaukonen; Katja Syvärinen; Esko-Juhani Tennilä; Pentti Tiusanen; Kari Uotila | 4: Matti Kangas; Veijo Puhjo; Pertti Turtiainen; Unto Valpas | – | 2: Mikko Immonen; Jaakko Laakso |
| G Swedish People's Party | 9: Eva Biaudet; Klaus Bremer; Jan-Erik Enestam; Christina Gestrin; Gunnar Jansson; Henrik Lax; Håkan Nordman; Margareta Pietikäinen; Ulla-Maj Wideroos | 3: Nils-Anders Granvik; Pehr Löv; Ola Rosendahl | – | – |
| G Green League | 11: Janina Andersson; Ulla Anttila; Tuija Brax; Merikukka Forsius; Satu Hassi; Irina Krohn; Rauha-Maria Mertjärvi; Kirsi Ojansuu; Erkki Pulliainen; Anni Sinnemäki; Osmo Soininvaara | – | – | – |
| Christian Democrats | – | 10: Leea Hiltunen; Jouko Jääskeläinen; Bjarne Kallis; Toimi Kankaanniemi; Kari Kärkkäinen; Marja-Leena Kemppainen; Päivi Räsänen; Leena Rauhala; Ismo Seivästö; Sakari Smeds | – | – |
| Alkioist Centre Group | – | 1: Sulo Aittoniemi | – | – |
| Finns Party | – | 1: Raimo Vistbacka | – | – |
| Total (Note: The Speaker of the Parliament, Riitta Uosukainen during the 1999–2003 parliamentary term, Eero Heinäluoma during the 2011–2015 parliamentary term and Maria Lohela from 2015 to 2018, votes only in case of a tied vote.) | 99 | 84 | 1 | 15 |
| Total | 49.7% | 42.2% | 0.5% | 7.5% |

The Parliament revised the law in May 2009, allowing a person in a registered partnership to adopt the biological children of their partner. On 1 March 2017, the ability to enter into a registered partnership was closed off. No further partnerships are granted in Finland, and existing registered partners only retain their status if they do not marry.

=== Statistics ===
4,215 registered partnerships were established in Finland between 2002 and 2017, with a high of 446 partnerships in 2002 and a low of 36 partnerships in 2017.

== Same-sex marriage ==
=== Summary ===
Same-sex marriage has been legal in Finland since 1 March 2017. Legislation to open marriage to same-sex couples passed the Parliament of Finland on 12 December 2014 with support from the Social Democratic Party (SDP), the Green League, the Left Alliance, the Swedish People's Party and the National Coalition Party (NCP). The Finns Party, the Christian Democrats and the Centre Party opposed same-sex marriage, though the latter has since rejected attempts to repeal the same-sex marriage law. In Finnish public discourse, same-sex marriage is commonly referred to as "equal marriage" or "gender-neutral marriage"; in Finnish as homoavioliitto or sukupuolineutraali avioliitto (pronounced [ˈsukupuo̯liˌneu̯trɑːli ˈɑʋioliːtːo]), and in Swedish as homoäktenskap or samkönat äktenskap (pronounced [ˈsɑmːtɕøːnɑt ˈekːtenskɑːp]).

=== 2007–2011 parliamentary term ===
A poll conducted by Christian newspaper Kotimaa in March 2010 showed that a narrow majority of Finnish MPs opposed same-sex marriage. Of the 126 MPs surveyed on whether they would support a gender-neutral marriage law, 46% were in favour and 54% were opposed. Support was strongest among Green and Left Alliance MPs, who unanimously supported same-sex marriage, followed by Social Democratic lawmakers at 63%. In contrast, a majority of MPs from the Centre Party and the National Coalition Party were opposed. However, a later survey in April 2010 by Helsingin Sanomat reported growing cross-party support for same-sex marriage and joint adoption rights. The Secretary of the National Coalition Party, Taru Tujunen, said that an initiative on same-sex marriage would be introduced at the next party conference. At the June 2010 party conference, NCP delegates voted in favor of a gender-neutral marriage law, although the vice-chairman of the NCP parliamentary group, Ben Zyskowicz, noted that a majority of the party's MPs remained opposed. Two weeks earlier, the Social Democrats passed a measure in favor of same-sex marriage. The Left Alliance and the Green League also support it. At the opening ceremony of Helsinki Pride on 28 June 2010, Foreign Minister Alexander Stubb endorsed a gender-neutral marriage law with full adoption rights for same-sex couples.

On 2 July 2010, Justice Minister Tuija Brax announced that the Ministry of Justice would be preparing a reform to the Marriage Act (Finnish: Avioliittolaki; Swedish: Äktenskapslag) in the autumn of 2011. It was considered possible that same-sex marriage would be legalized after the 2011 parliamentary elections, where it was speculated to turn into a major theme, though in an August 2010 survey by Yle only 20% of respondents said the issue should be a major theme.

=== 2011–2015 parliamentary term ===
Laws regarding same-sex partnerships in Europe¹ Marriage Civil union Limited domestic recognition (cohabitation) Unrecognized Constitution limits marriage to opposite-sex couples ¹ May include recent laws or court decisions that have not yet entered into effect.

According to the voting advice application of the Helsingin Sanomat newspaper, 90 of the 200 MPs elected in April 2011 supported joint adoption rights for same-sex couples, while 93 MPs were opposed. Upon joining the Katainen Cabinet, the Christian Democrats demanded assurances that no government bill would legalise same-sex marriage. However, during government formation talks, it was agreed that if a legislative proposal were introduced as a member's initiative by individual MPs, it could be supported by the remaining five parties in the coalition: the National Coalition Party, the Social Democrats, the Left Alliance, the Green League and the Swedish People's Party. Such a proposal was indeed presented as a member's initiative on 29 September 2011.

On 21 March 2012, after five months of signature gathering among MPs, the bill to legalize same-sex marriage was submitted to Parliament. 76 out of the 199 voting MPs had signed their support for the draft bill, and several additional members were expected to vote for it, including Prime Minister Jyrki Katainen. On 27 February 2013, the bill was rejected by the Legal Affairs Committee in a 8–9 vote. Consequently, a similar bill was introduced as a citizens' initiative, organised by the Tahdon2013 campaign ("I do 2013"). The campaign began collecting signatures on 19 March 2013, and by the evening of the first day, it had already gathered over 90,000 online signatures—eventually reaching a total of 166,851 signatures. This far exceeded the 50,000-signature threshold required for an initiative to be submitted to Parliament.

Citizens' initiatives had only been possible in Finland since 2012. As such, in March 2013, it remained unclear whether a citizens' initiative would be treated on equal footing with a government bill (hallituksen esitys, regeringens proposition), or a member's initiative (lakialoite, lagmotion). Members' initiatives signed by at least 100 MPs are prioritised in the legislative process, while those with fewer signatures typically expire at the end of the legislative session. In April 2013, the Speaker's Council of Parliament issued guidelines for processing citizens' initiatives. According to these recommendations, all initiatives must be referred to a parliamentary committee selected by the plenary session. Within six months, the committee must inform the signatories of its planned course of action, which may include holding expert hearings or deciding whether to recommend the initiative for a vote in the plenary. The committee retains full autonomy in how it handles the initiative. Signature gathering for the same-sex marriage initiative concluded in September 2013 after the standard six months period, and the initiative was submitted to Parliament on 13 December 2013. In February 2014, it was referred to the Legal Affairs Committee. The committee voted unanimously to schedule a public hearing for 13 March 2014. Following the hearing, Yle reported that the initiative would proceed to the plenary session and would not be shelved by the committee. However, on 25 June 2014, after multiple committee hearings with experts, the Legal Affairs Committee voted 6–10 against the initiative. The vote would have been closer but two members in favour of same-sex marriage were absent and were replaced by a substitute member who voted against it.

On 20 November 2014, the committee recommended 8–9 that the Parliament reject the same-sex marriage legislation. In the bill's first reading on 28 November 2014, the full session of Parliament, by a vote of 92–105, did not accept that recommendation. Due to the Parliament not accepting the recommendation, the Grand Committee continued consideration of the initiative on 3 December 2014, eventually voting 17–8 in favour. The legislation was approved 101–90 by the full session of Parliament in its final reading on 12 December, and was signed into law by President Sauli Niinistö on 20 February 2015. The same-sex marriage law was short; it added the following sentence to article 1 of the Marriage Act: Two people who have agreed to marry each other are engaged. (Note: In the official languages of Finland: Finnish: Kaksi henkilöä, jotka ovat sopineet menevänsä avioliittoon keskenään, ovat kihlautuneet.; Swedish: Två personer som har kommit överens om att ingå äktenskap med varandra är förlovade.) Parliament also approved a statement requiring the next government to draft necessary amendments to other relevant acts to replace specific references to opposite-sex couples with gender-neutral language. The law took effect on 1 March 2017.

12 December 2014 vote in the Parliament
| Party | Voted for | Voted against | Abstained | Absent (Did not vote) |
|---|---|---|---|---|
| G National Coalition Party | 26: Markku Eestilä; Leena Harkimo; Timo Heinonen; Harri Jaskari; Sampsa Kataja; Pia Kauma; Pauli Kiuru; Esko Kurvinen; Sanna Lauslahti; Elina Lepomäki; Marjo Matikainen-Kallström; Outi Mäkelä; Tapani Mäkinen; Lasse Männistö; Petteri Orpo; Jaana Pelkonen; Pertti Salolainen; Sari Sarkomaa; Alexander Stubb; Eero Suutari; Lenita Toivakka; Anu Urpalainen; Sinuhe Wallinheimo; Jan Vapaavuori; Sofia Vikman; Anne-Mari Virolainen | 15: Heikki Autto; Pertti Hemmilä; Anne Holmlund; Kalle Jokinen; Jukka Kopra; Eero Lehti; Mikael Palola; Pekka Ravi; Paula Risikko; Janne Sankelo; Kimmo Sasi; Arto Satonen; Kari Tolvanen; Raija Vahasalo; Ben Zyskowicz | – | 3: Sanni Grahn-Laasonen; Ilkka Kanerva; Markku Mäntymaa |
| G Social Democratic Party | 36: Jouni Backman; Eeva-Johanna Eloranta; Maarit Feldt-Ranta; Tarja Filatov; Jukka Gustafsson; Maria Guzenina; Rakel Hiltunen; Susanna Huovinen; Lauri Ihalainen; Mikael Jungner; Ilkka Kantola; Saara Karhu; Mika Kari; Anneli Kiljunen; Krista Kiuru; Johannes Koskinen; Merja Kuusisto; Suna Kymäläinen; Jukka Kärnä; Antti Lindtman; Päivi Lipponen; Riitta Myller; Johanna Ojala-Niemelä; Heli Paasio; Tuula Peltonen; Matti Saarinen; Kristiina Salonen; Jouko Skinnari; Katja Taimela; Hanna Tainio; Erkki Tuomioja; Tytti Tuppurainen; Jutta Urpilainen; Pauliina Viitamies; Pia Viitanen; Tuula Väätäinen | 3: Raimo Piirainen; Kari Rajamäki; Harry Wallin | – | 2: Merja Mäkisalo-Ropponen; Sirpa Paatero |
| Finns Party | 1: Arja Juvonen | 35: Juho Eerola; Ritva Elomaa; Lauri Heikkilä; Reijo Hongisto; Olli Immonen; Ari Jalonen; Anssi Joutsenlahti; Johanna Jurva; Pietari Jääskeläinen; Pentti Kettunen; Kimmo Kivelä; Osmo Kokko; Jari Lindström; Maria Lohela; Anne Louhelainen; Pirkko Mattila; Lea Mäkipää; Hanna Mäntylä; Martti Mölsä; Mika Niikko; Jussi Niinistö; Pentti Oinonen; Tom Packalén; Mika Raatikainen; Pirkko Ruohonen-Lerner; Vesa-Matti Saarakkala; Timo Soini; Ismo Soukola; Maria Tolppanen; Reijo Tossavainen; Kaj Turunen; Kauko Tuupainen; Pertti Virtanen; Ville Vähämäki; Juha Väätäinen | – | 1: Teuvo Hakkarainen |
| Centre Party | 6: Mikko Alatalo; Antti Kaikkonen; Paula Lehtomäki; Tuomo Puumala; Annika Saarikko; Kimmo Tiilikainen | 29: Sirkka-Liisa Anttila; Lasse Hautala; Timo Kalli; Anne Kalmari; Elsi Katainen; Inkeri Kerola; Esko Kiviranta; Katri Komi; Timo Korhonen; Laila Koskela; Seppo Kääriäinen; Jari Leppä; Mika Lintilä; Markus Lohi; Eeva-Maria Maijala; Aila Paloniemi; Mauri Pekkarinen; Terhi Peltokorpi; Arto Pirttilahti; Antti Rantakangas; Juha Rehula; Eero Reijonen; Simo Rundgren; Mikko Savola; Juha Sipilä; Ari Torniainen; Tapani Tölli; Mirja Vehkaperä; Anu Vehviläinen | 1: Markku Rossi | – |
| Left Alliance | 12: Paavo Arhinmäki; Katja Hänninen; Risto Kalliorinne; Anna Kontula; Martti Korhonen; Annika Lapintie; Silvia Modig; Jari Myllykoski; Aino-Kaisa Pekonen; Eila Tiainen; Kari Uotila; Erkki Virtanen | – | – | – |
| G Swedish People's Party | 9: Thomas Blomqvist; Jörn Donner; Christina Gestrin; Anna-Maja Henriksson; Elisabeth Nauclér; Mikaela Nylander; Mats Nylund; Stefan Wallin; Ulla-Maj Wideroos | 1: Lars Erik Gästgivars | – | – |
| Green League | 9: Outi Alanko-Kahiluoto; Tuija Brax; Satu Haapanen; Pekka Haavisto; Johanna Karimäki; Ville Niinistö; Anni Sinnemäki; Osmo Soininvaara; Jani Toivola | – | – | 1: Oras Tynkkynen |
| G Christian Democrats | – | 6: Sauli Ahvenjärvi; Jouko Jääskeläinen; Peter Östman; Sari Palm; Leena Rauhala; Päivi Räsänen | – | – |
| Left Faction (Note: Composed of two dissidents from the Left Alliance) | 2: Markus Mustajärvi; Jyrki Yrttiaho | – | – | – |
| Change 2011 | – | 1: James Hirvisaari | – | – |
| Total | 101 | 90 | 1 | 7 |
| Total | 50.8% | 45.2% | 0.5% | 3.5% |

=== 2015–2019 parliamentary term ===
Following elections in April 2015, a conservative government was formed, consisting of the Centre Party, the Finns Party and the National Coalition Party. Despite a majority of its MPs having voted against same-sex marriage, it was supposed to introduce amendments to other acts which still referred to married spouses as "man and woman". While the Finns Party thought the gender-neutral marriage law should be repealed, the other two parties generally disagreed. With the exception of the Christian Democrats, all opposition parties supported updating the language in other laws to reflect gender-neutral terms.

On 22 October 2015, the Parliament began debating legislation to amend other acts that still had specific references to opposite-sex couples. Minister of Justice Jari Lindström from the Finns Party, who introduced the bill, said he did so despite his personal opposition. On 11 December 2015, the Legal Affairs Committee recommended the adoption of the bill with amendments. The bill was approved by Parliament in a 106–42 vote on 17 February 2016. It was signed by President Niinistö on 8 April 2016 and took effect on 1 March 2017, on the same day as the amendments to the Marriage Act. Among laws amended were the Act on Population Information System and the Population Register Centre Certificate Services (661/2009), the Act on the Gender Recognition of Transsexuals (563/2002), and the Religious Freedom Act (453/2003).

17 February 2016 vote in the Parliament
| Party | Voted for | Voted against | Abstained | Absent (Did not vote) |
|---|---|---|---|---|
| G Centre Party | 22: Mikko Alatalo; Anne Berner; Hannakaisa Heikkinen; Petri Honkonen; Mikko Kärnä; Elsi Katainen; Timo Korhonen; Hanna Kosonen; Katri Kulmuni; Mika Lintilä; Aila Paloniemi; Ulla Parviainen; Tuomo Puumala; Olli Rehn; Juha Rehula; Markku Rossi; Annika Saarikko; Juha Sipilä; Kimmo Tiilikainen; Ari Torniainen; Matti Vanhanen; Anu Vehviläinen | 12: Sirkka-Liisa Anttila; Lasse Hautala; Hannu Hoskonen; Seppo Kääriäinen; Timo Kalli; Esko Kiviranta; Antti Kurvinen; Mauri Pekkarinen; Juha Pylväs; Mikko Savola; Martti Talja; Tapani Tölli | – | 15: Olavi Ala-Nissilä; Pertti Hakanen; Marisanna Jarva; Kauko Juhantalo; Antti Kaikkonen; Anne Kalmari; Niilo Keränen; Jari Leppä; Markus Lohi; Eeva-Maria Maijala; Markku Pakkanen; Arto Pirttilahti; Antti Rantakangas; Mirja Vehkaperä; Eerikki Viljanen |
| G Finns Party | 3: Tiina Elovaara; Arja Juvonen; Ville Tavio | 24: Juho Eerola; Simon Elo; Ritva Kike Elomaa; Teuvo Hakkarainen; Reijo Hongisto; Laura Huhtasaari; Olli Immonen; Ari Kristian Jalonen; Toimi Kankaanniemi; Kimmo Kivelä; Kari Kulmala; Rami Lehto; Jani Mäkelä; Lea Mäkipää; Leena Meri; Martti Mölsä; Mika Niikko; Mika Raatikainen; Jari Ronkainen; Vesa-Matti Saarakkala; Sami Savio; Sampo Terho; Kaj Turunen; Ville Vähämäki | – | 10: Jari Lindström; Anne Louhelainen; Hanna Mäntylä; Pirkko Mattila; Jussi Niinistö; Pentti Oinonen; Tom Packalén; Veera Ruoho; Timo Soini; Maria Tolppanen |
| G National Coalition Party | 25: Markku Eestilä; Sanni Grahn-Laasonen; Antti Häkkänen; Harry Harkimo; Harri Jaskari; Pauli Kiuru; Jaana Laitinen-Pesola; Sanna Lauslahti; Elina Lepomäki; Outi Mäkelä; Sari Multala; Kai Mykkänen; Petteri Orpo; Sari Raassina; Pertti Salolainen; Sari Sarkomaa; Arto Satonen; Alexander Stubb; Eero Suutari; Mari-Leena Talvitie; Lenita Toivakka; Kari Tolvanen; Juhana Vartiainen; Anne-Mari Virolainen; Sinuhe Wallinheimo | – | – | 12: Timo Heinonen; Kalle Jokinen; Ilkka Kanerva; Jukka Kopra; Susanna Koski; Eero Lehti; Jaana Pelkonen; Paula Risikko; Wille Rydman; Saara-Sofia Sirén; Sofia Vikman; Ben Zyskowicz |
| Social Democratic Party | 25: Eeva-Johanna Eloranta; Maarit Feldt-Ranta; Tarja Filatov; Jukka Gustafsson; Maria Guzenina; Timo Harakka; Eero Heinäluoma; Susanna Huovinen; Lauri Ihalainen; Ilkka Kantola; Anneli Kiljunen; Suna Kymäläinen; Antti Lindtman; Sanna Marin; Ilmari Nurminen; Johanna Ojala-Niemelä; Joona Räsänen; Nasima Razmyar; Antti Rinne; Kristiina Salonen; Ville Skinnari; Katja Taimela; Tytti Tuppurainen; Jutta Urpilainen; Pia Viitanen | 1: Harry Wallin | – | 8: Tuula Haatainen; Mika Kari; Krista Kiuru; Merja Mäkisalo-Ropponen; Riitta Myller; Sirpa Paatero; Satu Taavitsainen; Erkki Tuomioja |
| Green League | 14: Touko Aalto; Outi Alanko-Kahiluoto; Pekka Haavisto; Hanna Halmeenpää; Satu Hassi; Heli Järvinen; Johanna Karimäki; Jyrki Kasvi; Krista Mikkonen; Ville Niinistö; Olli-Poika Parviainen; Jani Toivola; Antero Vartia; Ozan Yanar | – | – | 1: Emma Kari |
| Left Alliance | 10: Li Andersson; Paavo Arhinmäki; Katja Hänninen; Annika Lapintie; Silvia Modig; Jari Myllykoski; Aino-Kaisa Pekonen; Hanna Sarkkinen; Matti Semi; Kari Uotila | – | – | 2: Anna Kontula; Markus Mustajärvi |
| Swedish People's Party | 7: Eva Biaudet; Carl Haglund; Anna-Maja Henriksson; Mikaela Nylander; Mats Nylund; Stefan Wallin; Mats Löfström | – | – | 3: Anders Adlercreutz; Thomas Blomqvist; Joakim Strand |
| Christian Democrats | – | 5: Sari Essayah; Antero Laukkanen; Peter Östman; Päivi Räsänen; Sari Tanus | – | – |
| Total | 106 | 42 | 0 | 51 |
| Total | 53.3% | 21.1% | 0.0% | 25.6% |

A bill to make necessary changes to social benefits and social and health care services was introduced on 3 November 2016, and approved by the Parliament in a 128–28 vote on 13 December 2016. It was signed by President Niinistö on 13 January 2017, and took effect alongside the amendments to the Marriage Act on 1 March.

13 December 2016 vote in the Parliament
| Party | Voted for | Voted against | Abstained | Absent (Did not vote) |
|---|---|---|---|---|
| G Centre Party | 41: Olavi Ala-Nissilä; Mikko Alatalo; Anne Berner; Pertti Hakanen; Hannakaisa Heikkinen; Petri Honkonen; Hannu Hoskonen; Marisanna Jarva; Kauko Juhantalo; Antti Kaikkonen; Timo Kalli; Anne Kalmari; Elsi Katainen; Esko Kiviranta; Timo V. Korhonen; Hanna Kosonen; Katri Kulmuni; Antti Kurvinen; Mikko Kärnä; Seppo Kääriäinen; Jari Leppä; Mika Lintilä; Markus Lohi; Eeva-Maria Maijala; Markku Pakkanen; Aila Paloniemi; Ulla Parviainen; Mauri Pekkarinen; Arto Pirttilahti; Tuomo Puumala; Juha Pylväs; Antti Rantakangas; Juha Rehula; Annika Saarikko; Mikko Savola; Juha Sipilä; Kimmo Tiilikainen; Ari Torniainen; Mirja Vehkaperä; Anu Vehviläinen; Eerikki Viljanen | – | – | 8: Sirkka-Liisa Anttila; Lasse Hautala; Niilo Keränen; Olli Rehn; Markku Rossi; Martti Talja; Tapani Tölli; Matti Vanhanen |
| G Finns Party | 13: Ritva Elomaa; Tiina Elovaara; Olli Immonen; Ari Jalonen; Arja Juvonen; Kimmo Kivelä; Anne Louhelainen; Pirkko Mattila; Hanna Mäntylä; Mika Niikko (Note: Both MPs Henry Wallin and Mika Niikko reported that they had intended to vote "No".); Tom Packalén; Ville Tavio; Kaj Turunen | 14: Simon Elo; Teuvo Hakkarainen; Reijo Hongisto; Laura Huhtasaari; Toimi Kankaanniemi; Kari Kulmala; Rami Lehto; Jani Mäkelä; Lea Mäkipää; Martti Mölsä; Mika Raatikainen; Vesa-Matti Saarakkala; Sami Savio; Timo Soini | 4: Juho Eerola; Leena Meri; Jussi Niinistö; Sampo Terho | 5: Jari Lindström; Pentti Oinonen; Jari Ronkainen; Veera Ruoho; Ville Vähämäki |
| G National Coalition Party | 24: Markku Eestilä; Sanni Grahn-Laasonen; Harry Harkimo; Timo Heinonen; Antti Häkkänen; Harri Jaskari; Kalle Jokinen; Pauli Kiuru; Jukka Kopra; Susanna Koski; Eero Lehti; Outi Mäkelä; Petteri Orpo; Jaana Pelkonen; Wille Rydman; Sari Sarkomaa; Saara-Sofia Sirén; Eero Suutari; Mari-Leena Talvitie; Lenita Toivakka; Kari Tolvanen; Sinuhe Wallinheimo; Anne-Mari Virolainen; Ben Zyskowicz | – | – | 13: Ilkka Kanerva; Jaana Laitinen-Pesola; Sanna Lauslahti; Elina Lepomäki; Sari Multala; Kai Mykkänen; Sari Raassina; Paula Risikko; Pertti Salolainen; Arto Satonen; Alexander Stubb; Juhana Vartiainen; Sofia Vikman |
| Social Democratic Party | 29: Eeva-Johanna Eloranta; Maarit Feldt-Ranta; Tarja Filatov; Jukka Gustafsson; Maria Guzenina; Tuula Haatainen; Timo Harakka; Eero Heinäluoma; Lauri Ihalainen; Ilkka Kantola; Mika Kari; Anneli Kiljunen; Krista Kiuru; Antti Lindtman; Sanna Marin; Riitta Myller; Merja Mäkisalo-Ropponen; Ilmari Nurminen; Johanna Ojala-Niemelä; Sirpa Paatero; Antti Rinne; Joona Räsänen; Ville Skinnari; Katja Taimela; Maria Tolppanen; Erkki Tuomioja; Tytti Tuppurainen; Pia Viitanen; Harry Wallin | – | – | 6: Susanna Huovinen; Suna Kymäläinen; Nasima Razmyar; Kristiina Salonen; Satu Taavitsainen; Jutta Urpilainen |
| Green League | 12: Touko Aalto; Outi Alanko-Kahiluoto; Pekka Haavisto; Satu Hassi; Heli Järvinen; Emma Kari; Johanna Karimäki; Jyrki Kasvi; Krista Mikkonen; Ville Niinistö; Antero Vartia; Ozan Yanar | – | – | 3: Hanna Halmeenpää; Olli-Poika Parviainen; Jani Toivola |
| Left Alliance | 9: Li Andersson; Paavo Arhinmäki; Katja Hänninen; Anna Kontula; Annika Lapintie; Aino-Kaisa Pekonen; Hanna Sarkkinen; Matti Semi; Kari Uotila | – | – | 3: Silvia Modig; Markus Mustajärvi; Jari Myllykoski |
| Swedish People's Party | – | 9 (Note: The nine deputies of the Swedish People's Party that were present accidentally voted against the bill, although the entire group supported it.): Anders Adlercreutz; Eva Biaudet; Thomas Blomqvist; Anna-Maja Henriksson; Mats Löfström; Mikaela Nylander; Mats Nylund; Veronica Rehn-Kivi; Stefan Wallin | – | 1: Joakim Strand |
| Christian Democrats | – | 5: Sari Essayah; Antero Laukkanen; Peter Östman; Päivi Räsänen; Sari Tanus | – | – |
| Total | 128 | 28 | 4 | 39 |
| Total | 64.3% | 14.1% | 2.0% | 19.6% |

A citizens' initiative to repeal the gender-neutral marriage law was launched on 29 March 2015. The initiative collected almost 110,000 signatures by 29 September 2015 and was presented to the Parliament on 22 June 2016. On 8 September 2016, it was referred to the Legal Affairs Committee after a plenary debate. On 15 February 2017, the committee recommended that the Parliament reject the initiative. On 17 February, the Parliament voted to accept the committee's recommendation by a 120–48 margin with 2 abstentions.

17 February 2017 vote in the Parliament
| Party | Voted for | Voted against | Abstained | Absent (Did not vote) |
|---|---|---|---|---|
| G Centre Party | 26: Olavi Ala-Nissilä; Mikko Alatalo; Anne Berner; Petri Honkonen; Antti Kaikkonen; Anne Kalmari; Elsi Katainen; Timo V. Korhonen; Hanna Kosonen; Katri Kulmuni; Mikko Kärnä; Seppo Kääriäinen; Jari Leppä; Mika Lintilä; Aila Paloniemi; Ulla Parviainen; Pekka Puska; Tuomo Puumala; Juha Pylväs; Antti Rantakangas; Juha Rehula; Markku Rossi; Kimmo Tiilikainen; Mirja Vehkaperä; Anu Vehviläinen; Eerikki Viljanen | 13: Pertti Hakanen; Lasse Hautala; Hannu Hoskonen; Marisanna Jarva; Timo Kalli; Esko Kiviranta; Antti Kurvinen; Markus Lohi; Eeva-Maria Maijala; Arto Pirttilahti; Mikko Savola; Martti Talja; Tapani Tölli | 2: Markku Pakkanen; Ari Torniainen | 8: Sirkka-Liisa Anttila; Hannakaisa Heikkinen; Kauko Juhantalo; Niilo Keränen; Mauri Pekkarinen; Annika Saarikko; Juha Sipilä; Matti Vanhanen |
| G Finns Party | 3: Tiina Elovaara; Arja Juvonen; Ville Tavio | 28: Juho Eerola; Simon Elo; Ritva Elomaa; Teuvo Hakkarainen; Reijo Hongisto; Laura Huhtasaari; Olli Immonen; Ari Jalonen; Toimi Kankaanniemi; Kimmo Kivelä; Kari Kulmala; Jari Lindström; Anne Louhelainen; Pirkko Mattila; Leena Meri; Jani Mäkelä; Lea Mäkipää; Martti Mölsä; Mika Niikko; Tom Packalén; Mika Raatikainen; Jari Ronkainen; Vesa-Matti Saarakkala; Sami Savio; Timo Soini; Sampo Terho; Kaj Turunen; Ville Vähämäki | – | 5: Rami Lehto; Hanna Mäntylä; Jussi Niinistö; Pentti Oinonen; Veera Ruoho |
| G National Coalition Party | 31: Markku Eestilä; Harry Harkimo; Timo Heinonen; Antti Häkkänen; Harri Jaskari; Kalle Jokinen; Ilkka Kanerva; Pauli Kiuru; Jukka Kopra; Jaana Laitinen-Pesola; Sanna Lauslahti; Elina Lepomäki; Sari Multala; Kai Mykkänen; Outi Mäkelä; Petteri Orpo; Jaana Pelkonen; Sari Raassina; Pertti Salolainen; Sari Sarkomaa; Arto Satonen; Saara-Sofia Sirén; Alexander Stubb; Eero Suutari; Mari-Leena Talvitie; Lenita Toivakka; Kari Tolvanen; Juhana Vartiainen; Sofia Vikman; Anne-Mari Virolainen; Ben Zyskowicz | 1: Susanna Koski | – | 5: Sanni Grahn-Laasonen; Eero Lehti; Paula Risikko; Wille Rydman; Sinuhe Wallinheimo |
| Social Democratic Party | 30: Eeva-Johanna Eloranta; Maarit Feldt-Ranta; Tarja Filatov; Jukka Gustafsson; Maria Guzenina; Tuula Haatainen; Timo Harakka; Eero Heinäluoma; Susanna Huovinen; Lauri Ihalainen; Ilkka Kantola; Mika Kari; Anneli Kiljunen; Krista Kiuru; Suna Kymäläinen; Sanna Marin; Riitta Myller; Merja Mäkisalo-Ropponen; Ilmari Nurminen; Johanna Ojala-Niemelä; Sirpa Paatero; Nasima Razmyar; Antti Rinne; Joona Räsänen; Ville Skinnari; Satu Taavitsainen; Katja Taimela; Maria Tolppanen; Erkki Tuomioja; Pia Viitanen | 1: Harry Wallin | – | 4: Antti Lindtman; Kristiina Salonen; Tytti Tuppurainen; Jutta Urpilainen |
| Green League | 13: Touko Aalto; Outi Alanko-Kahiluoto; Pekka Haavisto; Hanna Halmeenpää; Satu Hassi; Heli Järvinen; Emma Kari; Johanna Karimäki; Jyrki Kasvi; Ville Niinistö; Olli-Poika Parviainen; Antero Vartia; Ozan Yanar | – | – | 2: Krista Mikkonen (Note: Both MPs Eva Biaudet and Krista Mikkonen stated that they voted incorrectly, as they were both registered as absent. They both intended to vote "Yes" on the committee report.); Jani Toivola |
| Left Alliance | 11: Li Andersson; Paavo Arhinmäki; Katja Hänninen; Annika Lapintie; Silvia Modig; Markus Mustajärvi; Jari Myllykoski; Aino-Kaisa Pekonen; Hanna Sarkkinen; Matti Semi; Kari Uotila | – | – | 1: Anna Kontula |
| Swedish People's Party | 6: Anders Adlercreutz; Anna-Maja Henriksson; Mats Löfström; Mats Nylund; Veronica Rehn-Kivi; Stefan Wallin | – | – | 4: Eva Biaudet; Thomas Blomqvist; Mikaela Nylander; Joakim Strand |
| Christian Democrats | – | 5: Sari Essayah; Antero Laukkanen; Peter Östman; Päivi Räsänen; Sari Tanus | – | – |
| Total | 120 | 48 | 2 | 29 |
| Total | 60.3% | 24.1% | 1.0% | 14.6% |

Finland was the last Nordic country to introduce same-sex marriage. Although the change has brought it into alignment with its Nordic neighbours, this represents a significant difference of approach to neighbouring Russia, which historically exercised influence in Finland's affairs through Finlandisation and is hostile to LGBTQ rights.

=== Statistics ===
In the first month after the gender-neutral marriage law came into effect, 857 same-sex marriages were recorded in Finland. Of these, 87 were newly performed marriages, while 770 were conversions of existing registered partnerships. By August 2017, 1,578 same-sex marriages had taken place in the country, of which 456 were new marriages and 1,122 were partnerships converted to marriages. The following table shows the number of marriages and divorces performed in Finland as per data published by Statistics Finland. It does not include conversions from registered partnerships.

Number of marriages and divorces in Finland
| Year | Same-sex marriages | | | Total marriages | Same-sex divorces | | | Total divorces |
| Year | Female | Male | Total | Total marriages | Female | Male | Total | Total divorces |
|---|---|---|---|---|---|---|---|---|
| 2017 | 373 | 181 | 554 | 26,542 | 1 | 1 | 2 | 13,485 |
| 2018 | 242 | 145 | 387 | 23,799 | 23 | 6 | 29 | 13,145 |
| 2019 | 263 | 113 | 376 | 22,296 | 42 | 12 | 54 | 13,365 |
| 2020 | 272 | 123 | 395 | 22,082 | 63 | 25 | 88 | 13,478 |
| 2021 | 265 | 110 | 375 | 19,579 | 68 | 17 | 85 | 12,166 |
| 2022 | 291 | 132 | 423 | 21,942 | 80 | 26 | 106 | 11,370 |
| 2023 | 254 | 119 | 373 | 20,693 | 106 | 28 | 134 | 11,475 |
| 2024 | 291 | 134 | 425 | 21,420 | 89 | 29 | 118 | 11,869 |
| 2025 | 352 | 142 | 494 | 22,082 | 111 | 30 | 141 | 11,795 |

=== Religious performance ===
Same-sex marriage remains a controversial topic in the Evangelical Lutheran Church of Finland, the largest Christian denomination in Finland. Thousands of Finns resigned from the Church in November 2014 due to comments made by some church officials supporting the new marriage legislation. Many priests officiate at same-sex marriages and offer their blessings to the couples. However, the matter is contentious within the Church. In November 2020, a group of ministers opposed to same-sex marriage called on the church synod to sanction priests who officiate at such marriages. The Archbishop of Turku, Tapio Luoma, has called on dioceses not to sanction priests who perform marriages for same-sex couples, saying that the issue "cannot be settled by sanctions" but that "any solution for the [C]hurch must be based on the fact that there can be disagreement on the matter". A 2019 survey conducted by the University of Eastern Finland showed that 57% of priests in the Evangelical Lutheran Church would marry same-sex couples if explicitly permitted by the church leadership to do so.

In September 2020, the Supreme Administrative Court of Finland ruled that diocesan chapters may sanction priests who perform same-sex marriages. The Diocese of Helsinki has taken a position not to issue warnings to priests who perform same-sex marriages. In March 2024, the Bishops' Conference of the Evangelical Lutheran Church of Finland proposed a compromise provision defining marriage as both between "a man and a woman" and between "two people". If approved by the General Synod, the measure would have allowed priests to perform same-sex marriages; however, it failed to reach the required threshold at a vote on 9 May 2025. It passed by 62 votes to 40—15 short of the 77 required. In November 2024, two parish churches in Vantaa voted to allow same-sex marriages.

== Public opinion ==
Support for same-sex marriage in Finland has grown gradually since the 2000s. The 2006 Eurobarometer poll put Finnish support for same-sex marriage at 45%, while an August 2010 survey conducted by Yle put support at 54% with 35% opposing it. In January 2013, a poll by YouGov showed that support had increased to 57%, with 32% opposed and 12% unsure. In the same survey, support for adoption by same-sex couples was 51%, with 36% opposed and 13% unsure. A March 2013 survey by Taloustutkimus found that 58% of Finns supported same-sex marriage. In March 2014, a follow-up Taloustutkimus survey put support at 65% with 27% opposing and 8% unsure.

A June 2014 survey showed that among clergy of the Evangelical Lutheran Church, 44% supported a gender-neutral marriage law, while 41% were opposed and 15% were neutral. 60% supported church blessings for registered partners, and 28% said the church should abandon the legislated duty to perform marriages if a gender-neutral marriage law is passed.

The 2015 Eurobarometer found that 66% of Finns thought same-sex marriage should be allowed throughout Europe, while 28% were opposed. A Pew Research Center poll, conducted between April and August 2017 and published in May 2018, showed that 64% of Finns supported same-sex marriage, 26% were opposed and 10% did not know or had refused to answer. When divided by religion, 84% of religiously unaffiliated people, 62% of non-practicing Christians and 30% of church-attending Christians supported same-sex marriage. Opposition was 12% among 18–34-year-olds. The 2019 Eurobarometer found that 76% of Finns thought same-sex marriage should be allowed throughout Europe, while 21% were opposed. The 2023 Eurobarometer showed that support had increased to 76%, while 18% were opposed. The survey also found that 82% of Finns thought that "there is nothing wrong in a sexual relationship between two persons of the same sex", while 14% disagreed.

== See also ==
- LGBT rights in Finland
- LGBT history in Finland
- Same-sex marriage in Estonia
- Same-sex marriage in Sweden
- Recognition of same-sex unions in Europe
