= Lahtela =

Lahtela is a Finnish surname. Notable people with the surname include:

- Olavi Lahtela (1915–1968), Finnish politician
- Seppo Lahtela (born 1947), Finnish politician
- Janne Lahtela (born 1974), Finnish athlete
- Mikko Lahtela (born 1992), Finnish ice hockey player
