= Tolppanen =

Tolppanen is a Finnish surname.

== Geographical distribution ==
As of 2014, 90.3% of all known bearers of the surname Tolppanen were residents of Finland (frequency 1:11,404), 6.4% of Sweden (1:289,611) and 2.1% of Canada (1:3,345,273).

In Finland, the frequency of the surname was higher than national average (1:11,404) in the following regions:

1. North Karelia (1:3,218)
2. Lapland (1:3,398)
3. Northern Savonia (1:3,404)
4. Central Finland (1:6,866)
5. Kainuu (1:8,960)
6. Southern Savonia (1:9,537)

== People ==
- Maria Tolppanen (born 1952), Finnish politicians
- Uniikki (born 1981), real name Dan Ahti Tolppanen, Finnish artist
