= Hongisto =

Hongisto is a surname. Notable people with the surname include:

- Reijo Hongisto (born 1962), Finnish policeman and politician
- Richard Hongisto (1936–2004), American businessman, politician, sheriff, and police chief
- Visa Hongisto (born 1987), Finnish sprinter
