= Gestrin =

Gestrin is a surname. Notable people with the surname include:

- Christina Gestrin (born 1967), Finnish politician
- Kristian Gestrin (1929–1990), Finnish judge and politician
- Terry Gestrin, American politician
