= Suutari =

Suutari is a Finnish occupational surname meaning "shoemaker", via German, ultimately from Latin: sutor. Notable people with the surname include:

- Sirpa Suutari, Finnish professional ballroom dancer
- Eero Suutari, member of the 36th Parliament of Finland
