= Markku Rossi =

Finnish politician (born 1956)

Member of the Finnish Parliament
- Incumbent
- Assumed office 1 October 2000
- In office 31 March 1999 – 20 July 1999
- In office 22 March 1991 – 23 March 1995

Personal details
- Born: 5 March 1956 (age 70) Suonenjoki, Finland
- Party: Centre Party

Markku Kalevi Rossi (born 5 March 1956) is a Finnish politician from the Centre Party. He was a representative in the Parliament of Finland from 1991 to 1995, briefly in 1999 and from 2000 to 2019. He has stated that he wouldn't seek another term in the 2019 elections.

Rossi was born in Suonenjoki. He married Matti Kaarlejärvi in March 2017, being among the first same-sex couples to marry under the legislation change in Finland. They had lived together in a registered partnership since December 2015.
