= Olavi Ala-Nissilä =

Finnish politician (born 1949)

Olavi Oskari Ala-Nissilä
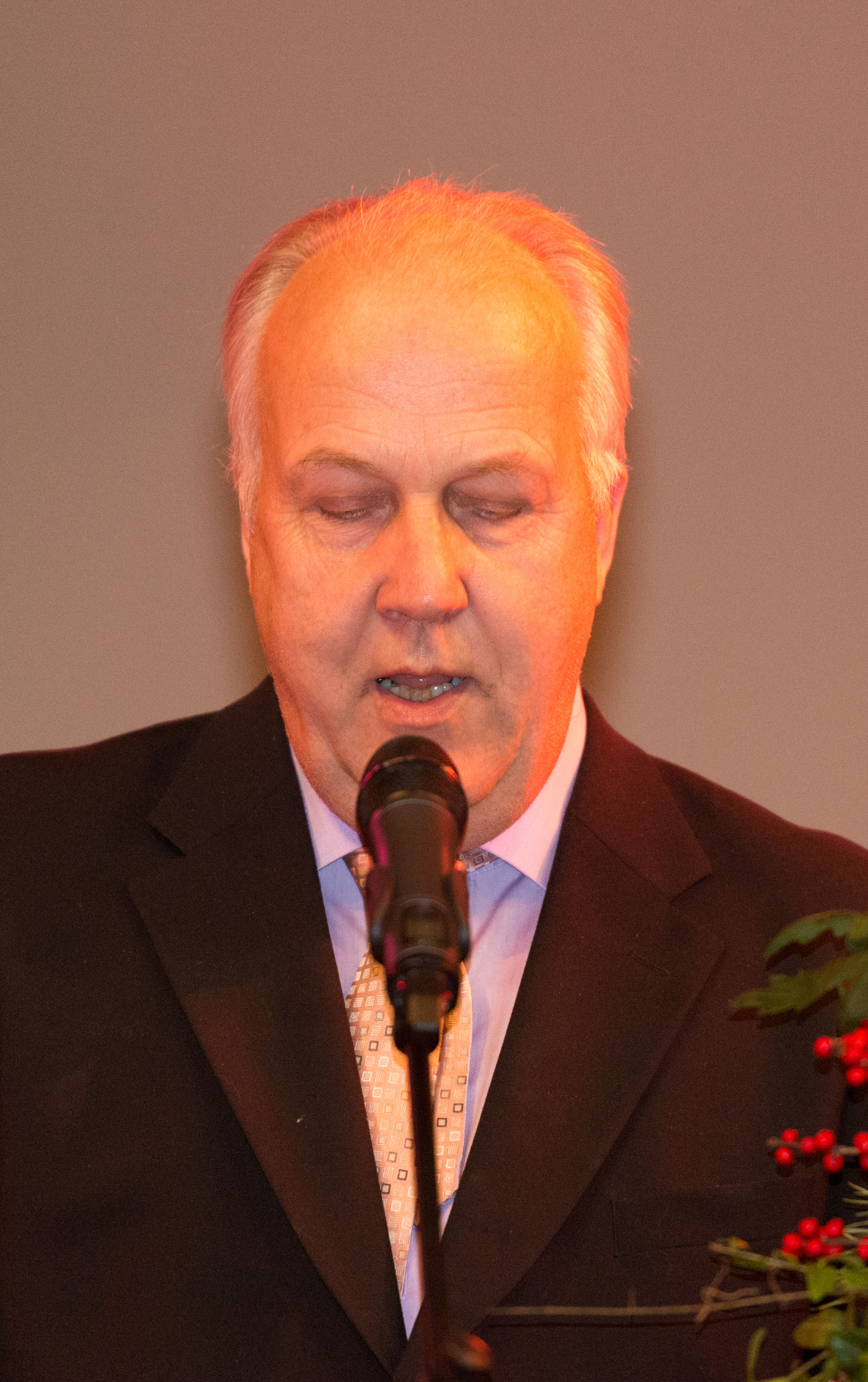

Member of the Finland Parliament for Southwest Finland
- In office 2015–2019
- In office 1991–2006

Member of the European Court of Auditors for Finland
- In office 1 March 2006 – 29 February 2012
- President: Hubert Weber; Vítor Manuel da Silva Caldeira
- Preceded by: Aunus Salmi
- Succeeded by: Ville Itälä

Personal details
- Born: August 2, 1949; Loimaan kunta
- Political party: Finnish Centre Party; EU ALDE

Olavi Oskari Ala-Nissilä (born August 2, 1949 in Loimaa kunta, Finland) is a Finnish politician. He has been an MP from 1991 to 2006 and was re-elected in 2015. Ala-Nissilä was a member of the European Court of Auditors in between 2006 and 2012.

Ala-Nissilä graduated in 1967, graduated as a graduate student in 1969 and graduated in economics in 1974. He completed a master's degree in Economics at the University of Turku in 1977. In 1980 Ala-Nissilä passed a HTM auditor's degree and in 1982 he was a certified auditor.

Ala-Nissilä was a member of the constituency of Southwest Finland for a continuous period from 1991 to 2006. He has been a member of parliament in charge of Finance Committee from 1995 to 2006 (2003–2006 chairman) and Parliament Banking Supervisor 1993–2006 and re-appointed in 2015. In 2006, Ala-Nissilä became a member of the European Court of Auditors for a six-year term and Mauri Salo was replaced by his deputy.

Since 2012 Ala-Nissilä has been an international auditing firm BDO's senior advisor. In the 2015 parliamentary elections, he was re-elected as a member of parliament. Ala-Nissilä is Vice Chairman of the Audit Committee.

Between 2001 and 2013, Ala-Nissilä was chairman of the Volleyball SM League and in 2014 became Honorary chairman. Since 2012, he has been an internal inspector of the European Volleyball Association.
