= Eerikki Viljanen =

Finnish politician

Member of the Finnish Parliament for Uusimaa
- In office 22 April 2015 – 16 April 2019
- Incumbent
- Assumed office 5 April 2023

Personal details
- Born: April 21, 1975 (age 51) Vihti, Finland
- Party: Centre Party

Eerikki Viljanen (born April 21, 1975) is a Finnish politician, representing the Centre Party in the Parliament of Finland since 2015. He was elected to the Parliament from the Uusimaa constituency in the 2015 elections with 2,902 votes. Viljanen has also served in the municipal council of Vihti 1997–2000 and again since 2005.
