= Simon Elo =

Finnish politician

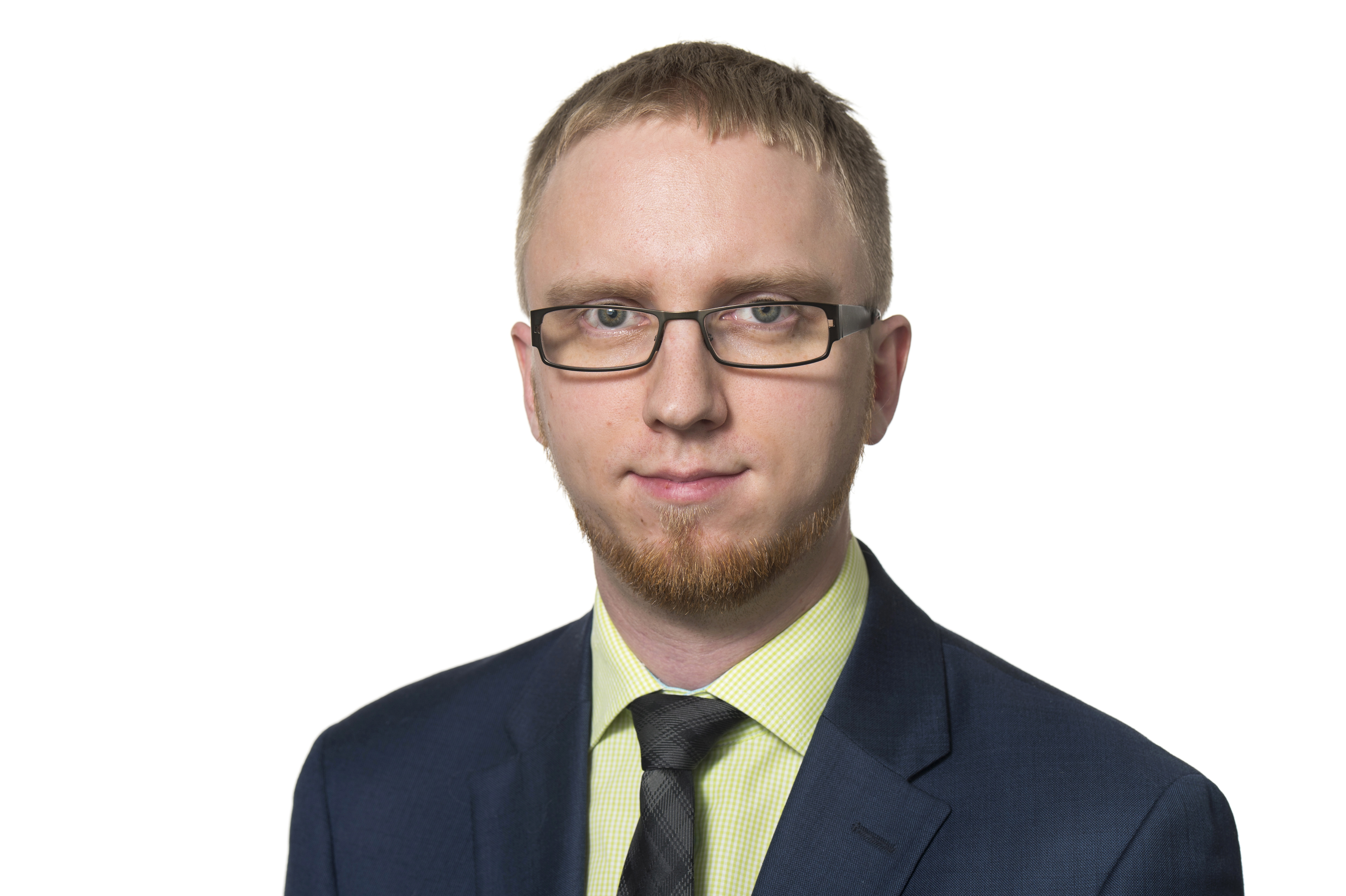
Simon Elo in March 2014.

Simon Jakob Benjamin Elo (born 8 July 1986 in Lapinjärvi) is a Finnish politician and a former Member of Parliament. He was a representative in the Finns Party until 2017 and was the leader of Finns Party Youth from 2010 to 2014. He was elected to the Parliament for Uusimaa in 2015. He has also sat in the Espoo City Council since 2012.

On 13 June 2017, Elo and 19 others left the Finns Party to establish the New Alternative parliamentary group. Elo was subsequently chosen to lead the group. Later a new party was formed based on the group under the name Blue Reform. In the 2019 election, Elo run as a candidate of the Blue Reform, but was not elected.

In August 2019, Elo left the Blue Reform and continues in the City Council of Espoo as an independent. In February 2020, Elo became a member of the National Coalition Party.
