= Matti Saarinen =

Finnish politician (died 2021)

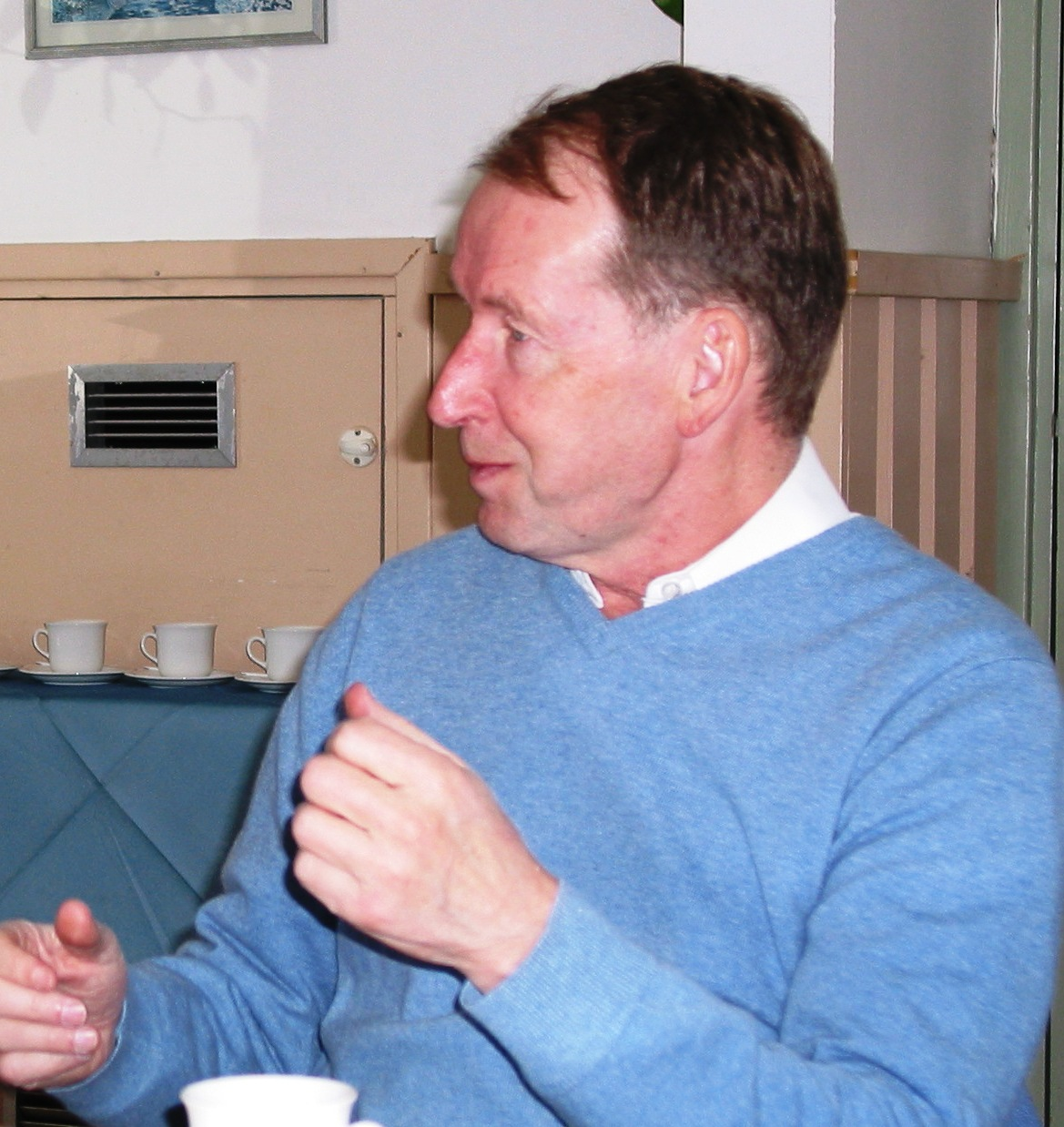
Matti Saarinen

Matti Saarinen (1946/1947 – 12 July 2021) was a Finnish politician who served as an MP.
