= Tiina Elovaara =

Finnish politician

Member of Finnish Parliament for Pirkanmaa
- In office 22 April 2015 – 2019

Personal details
- Born: 11 December 1986 (age 39) Tampere, Finland
- Party: Blue Reform (2017–); True Finns (2007–2017)

Tiina Karoliina Elovaara (born 11 December 1986) is a former member of the parliament of Finland, elected 22 April 2015; she was not reelected in the 2019 elections. She represented the True Finns until June 2017, when Elovaara and 19 other MPs left the Finns Party parliamentary group to found their own parliamentary group, which would later be known as the Blue Reform. On 16 December 2017, Elovaara was elected as the Second Vice Chairman of the Blue Reform.
