= Maarit Feldt-Ranta =

Finnish politician (1968–2019)

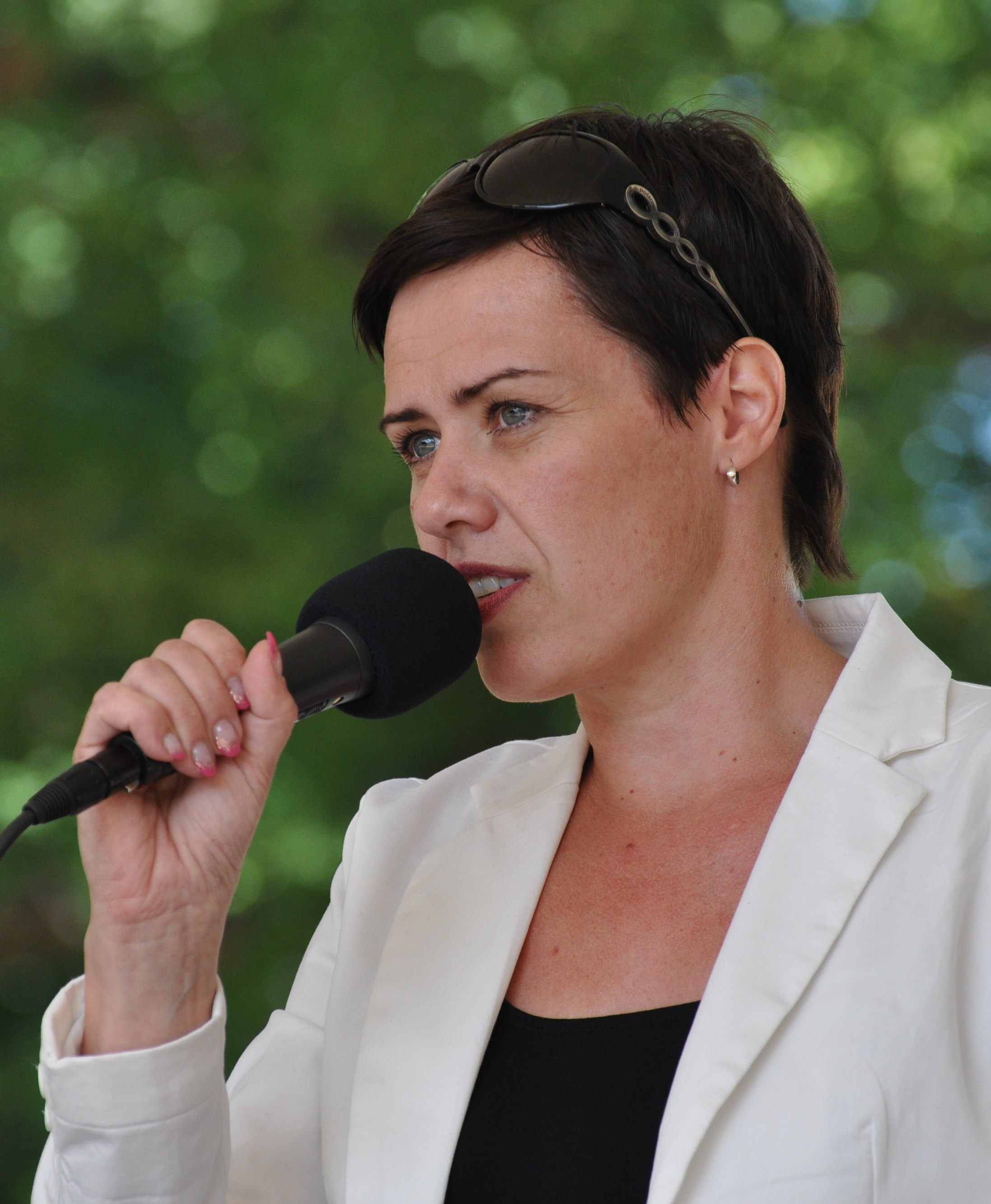

Member of the Finnish Parliament
- In office 21 March 2007 – 16 April 2019

Personal details
- Born: 26 April 1968 Karis, Finland
- Died: 27 November 2019 (aged 51)
- Party: Social Democratic Party of Finland

Maarit Kristiina Feldt-Ranta (26 April 1968 – 27 November 2019) was a Finnish politician, who represented the Social Democratic Party of Finland. She had represented the electoral district of Uusimaa in the Parliament of Finland since 2007. In 2017, she was elected as the vice-chair of the party.

On 21 June 2017, Feldt-Ranta announced that she would seek the candidacy of the SDP in the 2018 presidential election. She took part in the party primary against Tuula Haatainen and Sirpa Paatero. Feldt-Ranta finished second on the primary, gaining 42.3% of the votes behind Tuula Haatainen's 48.6%.

In January 2019, Feldt-Ranta announced that she wouldn't run for parliament in the 2019 elections due to her stomach cancer returning. She had fought cancer twice previously. In May 2019, she announced that she would discontinue treatment for her cancer. She died six months later on 27 November.
