= Veronica Rehn-Kivi =

Finnish politician

Member of the Finnish Parliament for Uusimaa
- In office 9 August 2016 – 4 April 2023

Personal details
- Born: 10 February 1956 (age 70) Helsinki, Uusimaa, Finland
- Party: Swedish People's Party
- Spouse: Timo Kivi
- Children: 3
- Parent(s): Elisabeth Carlberg; Ove Rehn
- Occupation: Politician

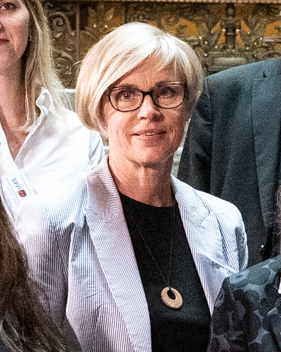
Rehn-Kivi in 2023

Veronica Rehn-Kivi (born 10 February 1956) is a Finnish politician, representing the Swedish People's Party. She was born in Helsinki, and became a member of the Parliament of Finland in August 2016, after Carl Haglund left his seat. Rehn-Kivi has been a member of the City Council of Kauniainen since 1997 and chairman of the City Council since 2015.

Rehn-Kivi is daughter of former Minister of Defence Elisabeth Rehn and her husband, Ove Rehn. She is married with Timo Kivi and has three children.
