= Mikko Lahtela =

Finnish ice hockey player

- Born: October 19, 1992 (age 32); Lahti, Finland
- Height: 6 ft 2 in (188 cm)
- Weight: 187 lb (85 kg; 13 st 5 lb)
- Position: Forward
- Shoots: Left
- Liiga team: Lahti Pelicans
- NHL draft: Undrafted
- Playing career: 2013–present

Mikko Lahtela (born October 19, 1992) is a Finnish ice hockey player. He is currently playing with Lahti Pelicans in the Finnish Liiga.

Lahtela made his Liiga debut playing with Lahti Pelicans during the 2014–15 Liiga season.
