= Antero Laukkanen =

Finnish politician (1958–2024)

Antero Jorma Laukkanen

Member of the Finnish Parliament for Uusimaa
- In office 22 April 2015 – 4 April 2023

Personal details
- Born: 30 May 1958 Kouvola, Kymenlaakso, Finland
- Died: 13 December 2024 (aged 66) Espoo, Uusimaa, Finland
- Party: Christian Democrats
- Occupation: Priest, businessman
- Website: www.anterolaukkanen.fi

Antero Jorma Laukkanen (30 May 1958 – 13 December 2024) was a Finnish pastor and politician who represented the Christian Democrats in the City Council of Espoo from 2001 until 2023 and in the Parliament of Finland from 2015 until 2023. He was elected to the Parliament from the Uusimaa constituency in the 2015 elections with 2,520 votes.

Laukkanen was born in Kouvola. He was the founder of the Majakka Church (Lighthouse Church) in Espoo and he served the church as a pastor. Laukkanen died in Espoo, Uusimaa on 13 December 2024, at the age of 66.
