= Mika Raatikainen =

Finnish politician

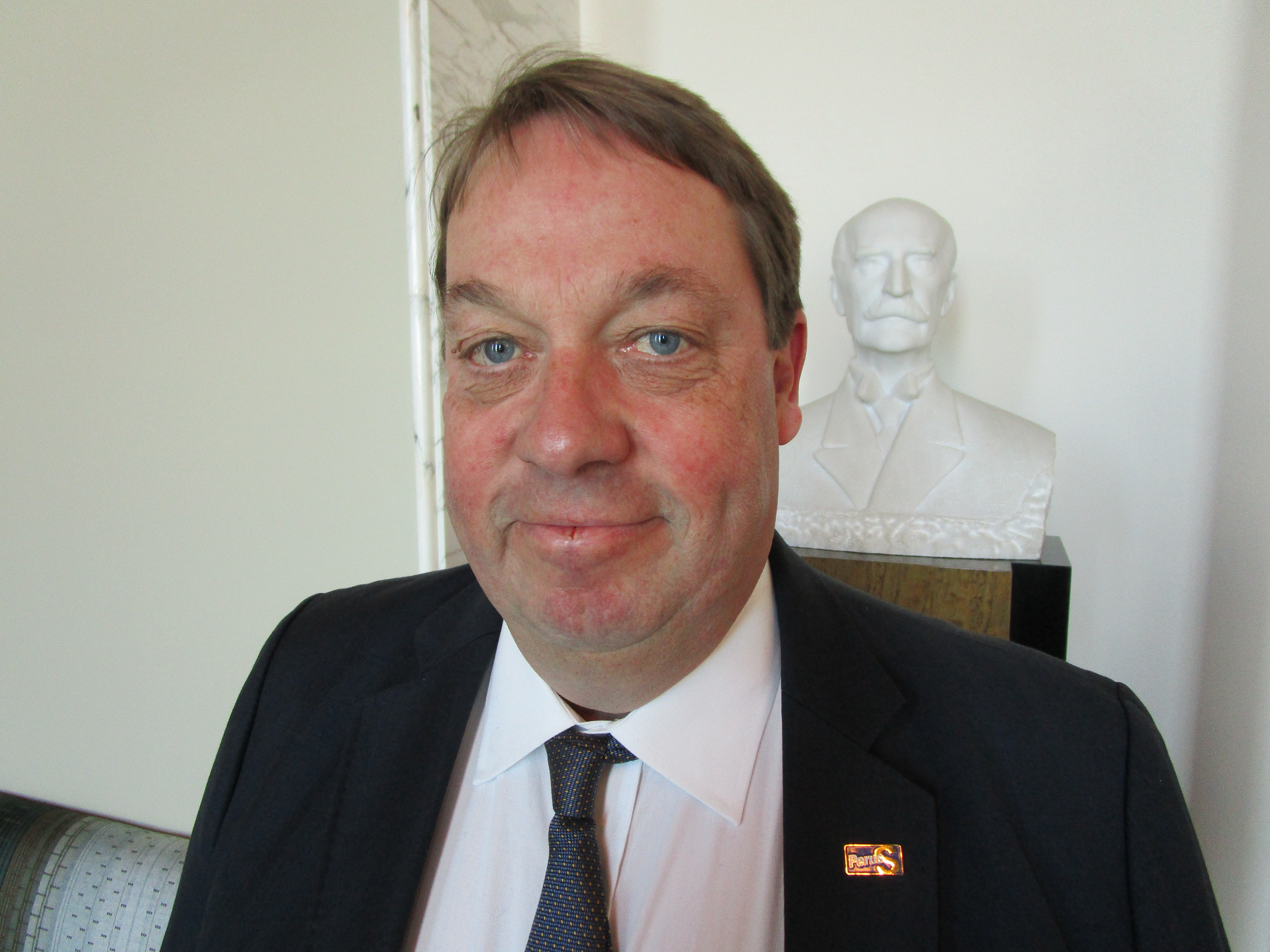
- Mika Raatikainen in Parliament on 12 February 2019

Member of the Finnish Parliament for Helsinki
- In office 4 July 2014 – 16 April 2019
- Preceded by: Jussi Halla-aho
- In office 24 April 2019 – 2 July 2019

Personal details
- Born: 7 November 1961 (age 64) Helsinki, Uusimaa, Finland
- Party: The Finns Party

Mika Pekka Raatikainen (born 7 November 1961) is a Finnish politician, policeman and a member of Finnish Parliament, representing the Finns Party. Raatikainen was born in Helsinki. He was first elected as a substitute member to the parliament in 2011, and became member of parliament on 4 July 2014, when Jussi Halla-aho left to the European Parliament. In the 2015 parliamentary election, Raatikainen got 3,370 votes and got elected.

Raatikainen was not re-elected in the 2019 parliamentary election, but again took the seat of Halla-aho as a substitute in April 2019, due to Halla-aho's ongoing term in the European Parliament.

Before a career in the politics, Raatikainen had a long career in the Helsinki Police Department, in which he started working in 1983. He has a Lebanese wife, who he first met in Italy in 2006.
