= Sari Raassina =

Finnish politician

Member of the Finnish Parliament
- Incumbent
- Assumed office 22 April 2015

Personal details
- Born: 19 April 1963 (age 63) Jyväskylä, Finland
- Party: National Coalition Party

Sari Johanna Raassina (born 19 April 1963) is a Finnish politician, representing the National Coalition Party in the Parliament of Finland since 2015. She was elected to the Parliament from the Savonia-Karelia constituency in 2015 with 3,978 votes.
