= Joona Räsänen =

Finnish politician (born 1987)

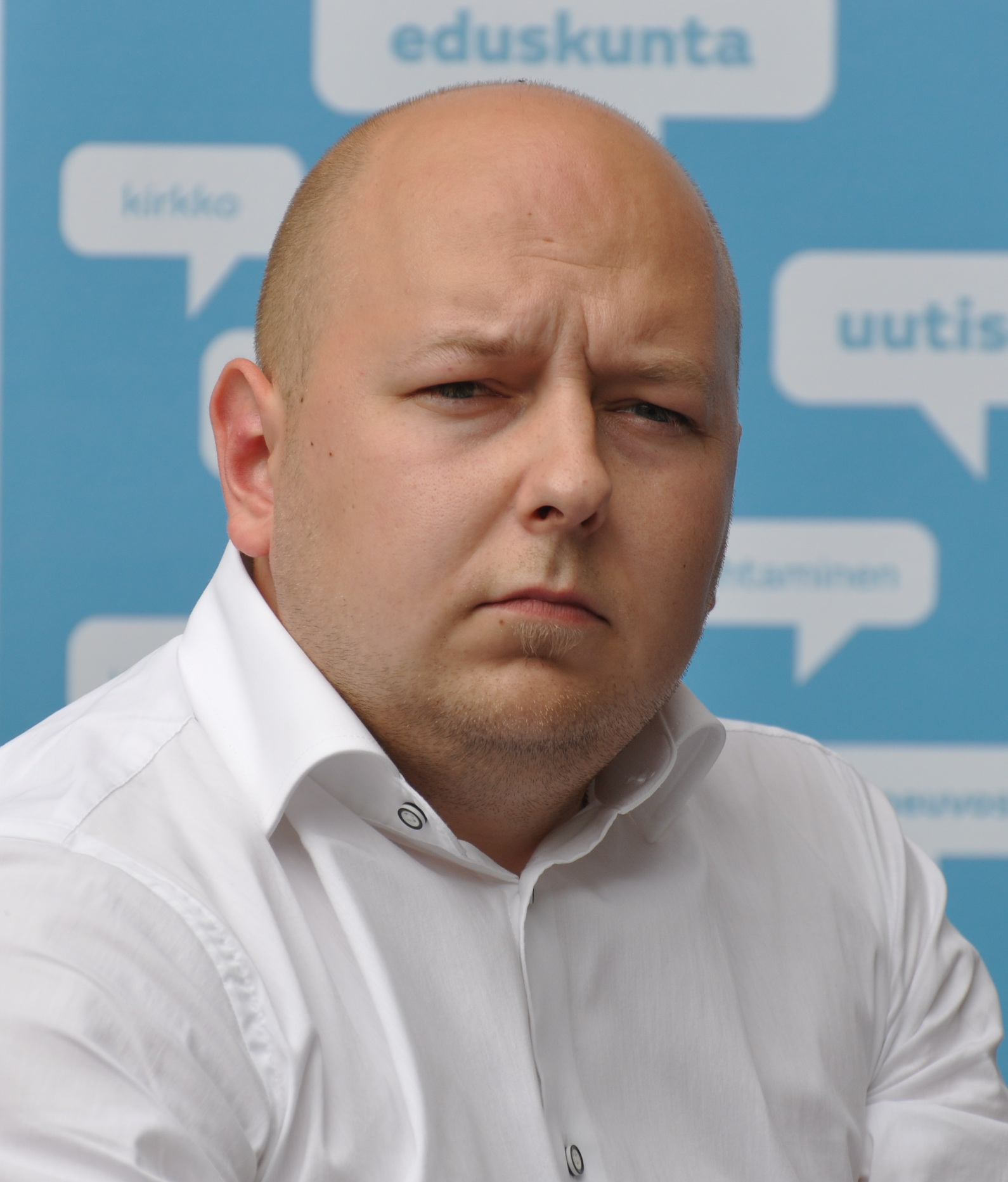
- Räsänen in 2014

Member of the Parliament of Finland
- Incumbent
- Assumed office 5 April 2023
- Constituency: Uusimaa
- In office 19 April 2015 – 16 April 2019
- Constituency: Uusimaa

Personal details
- Born: 24 February 1987 (age 39)
- Party: Social Democratic Party of Finland

Joona Räsänen (born 24 February 1987) is a Finnish politician. He has been a member of the Parliament of Finland since 2023, having previously served from 2015 to 2019. From 2012 to 2016, he served as chairman of the Social Democratic Youth.
