= Anu Urpalainen =

Finnish politician

Member of the Parliament of Finland
- In office 2012–2015

Personal details
- Born: 27 September 1966 (age 59) Imatra, Finland
- Party: National Coalition Party
- Occupation: Politician

Anu Johanna Urpalainen (born 27 September 1966 in Imatra, Finland) is a Finnish politician representing the Finnish Coalition Party. She was a Member of Parliament from the Kymi constituency in 2012–2015.

== Political career ==
Urpalainen has been a candidate for Parliament four times. In the 2003 elections she received 2 296 votes, in the 2007 elections 3 332 votes and in the 2011 elections 3 322 votes, having been an alternate. She was elected to Parliament after Minister of Economic Affairs Jyri Häkämies became CEO of the Confederation of Finnish Industries in November 2012. Urpalainen was also a candidate in the 2015 parliamentary elections, but was not elected for a further term.

Urpalainen has been a member of Imatra City Council since 1997. In the 2012 municipal elections, she was the leading member of the Coalition Party in Imatra, receiving 382 votes. Prior to that, she served four years as chairman of the Imatra City Council. She is also a member of the board of the South Karelia Union.

Urpalainen graduated from Vuoksenniska Secondary School in 1985 and from the University of Eastern Finland with a master's degree in education in 1993. She has worked as a classroom teacher in Joutseno since 1995 and later as the rector of Martikanpello School in Joutseno, Lappeenranta, since 2007. Urpalainen is also known as a sports influencer, and she was the long-time president of the baseball club Imatran Pallo-Veikko.
