= Antero Vartia =

Finnish actor and politician (born 1980)

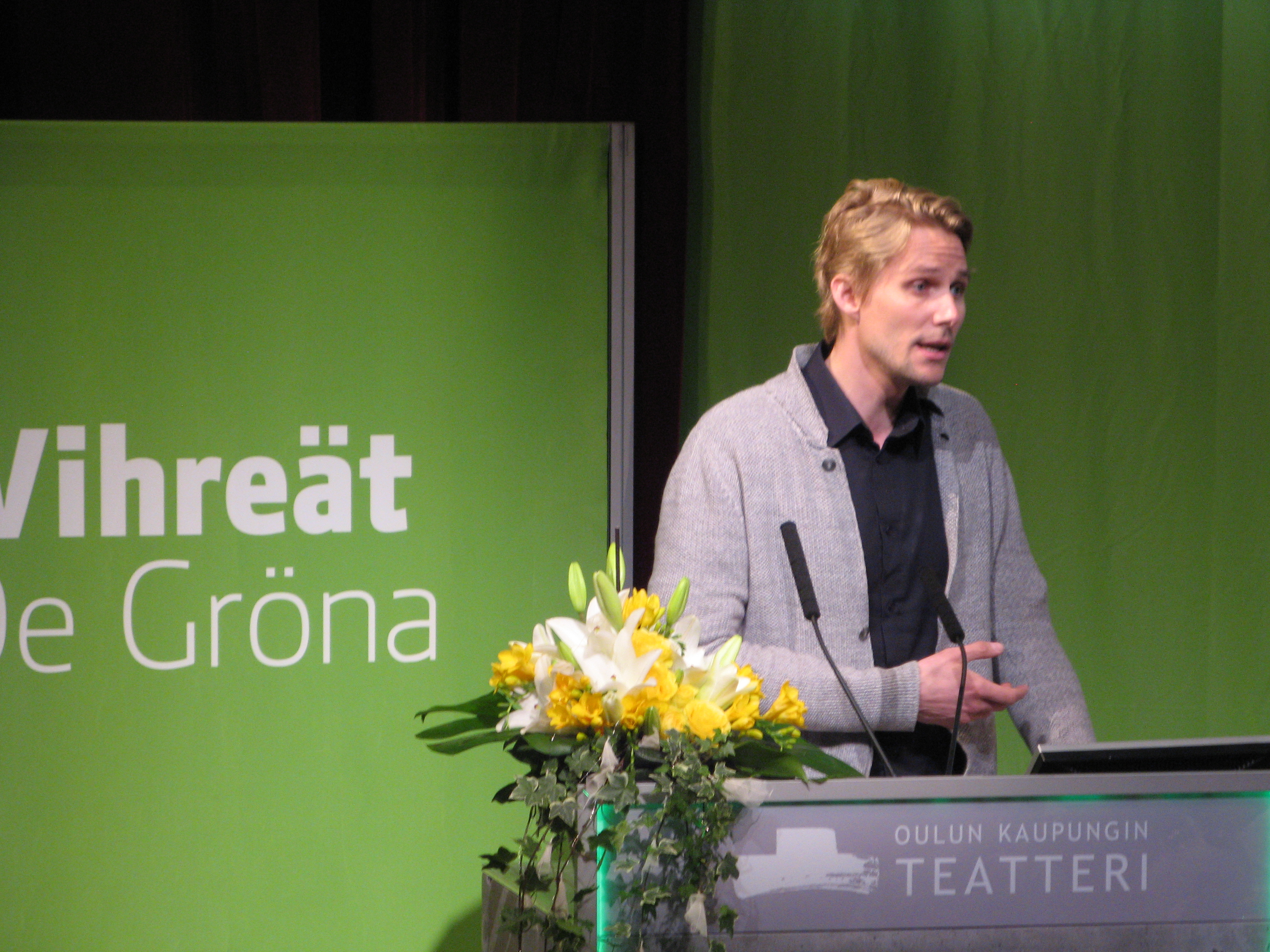
Antero Vartia

Antero Vartia (born 22 August 1980 in Helsinki) is a Finnish politician, entrepreneur and former actor representing the Green League. He was elected to the Parliament of Finland in the parliamentary election in 2015. Previously he was a candidate in the 2014 European Parliament election.

Vartia is known from the Finnish soap opera Salatut elämät, in which he played Kuisma Savolainen. Later he co-hosted the Finnish version of the Dutch documentary series Spoorloos. Vartia's mother is from Iceland, and thus Vartia has dual citizenship of Finland and Iceland.
