= Katja Hänninen =

Finnish politician

Member of the Finnish Parliament for Oulu
- Incumbent
- Assumed office 4 July 2014

Personal details
- Born: January 26, 1980 (age 46) Oulainen, North Ostrobothnia, Finland
- Party: Left Alliance
- Occupation: Salesperson
- Website: http://katjahanninen.fi/

Katja Maria Hänninen (born 26 January 1980, in Oulainen) is a Finnish politician. She has been a member of the Parliament of Finland since 2014, when she replaced Merja Kyllönen, who became an MEP. She is a member of the Left Alliance.
