= Mika Niikko =

Finnish politician

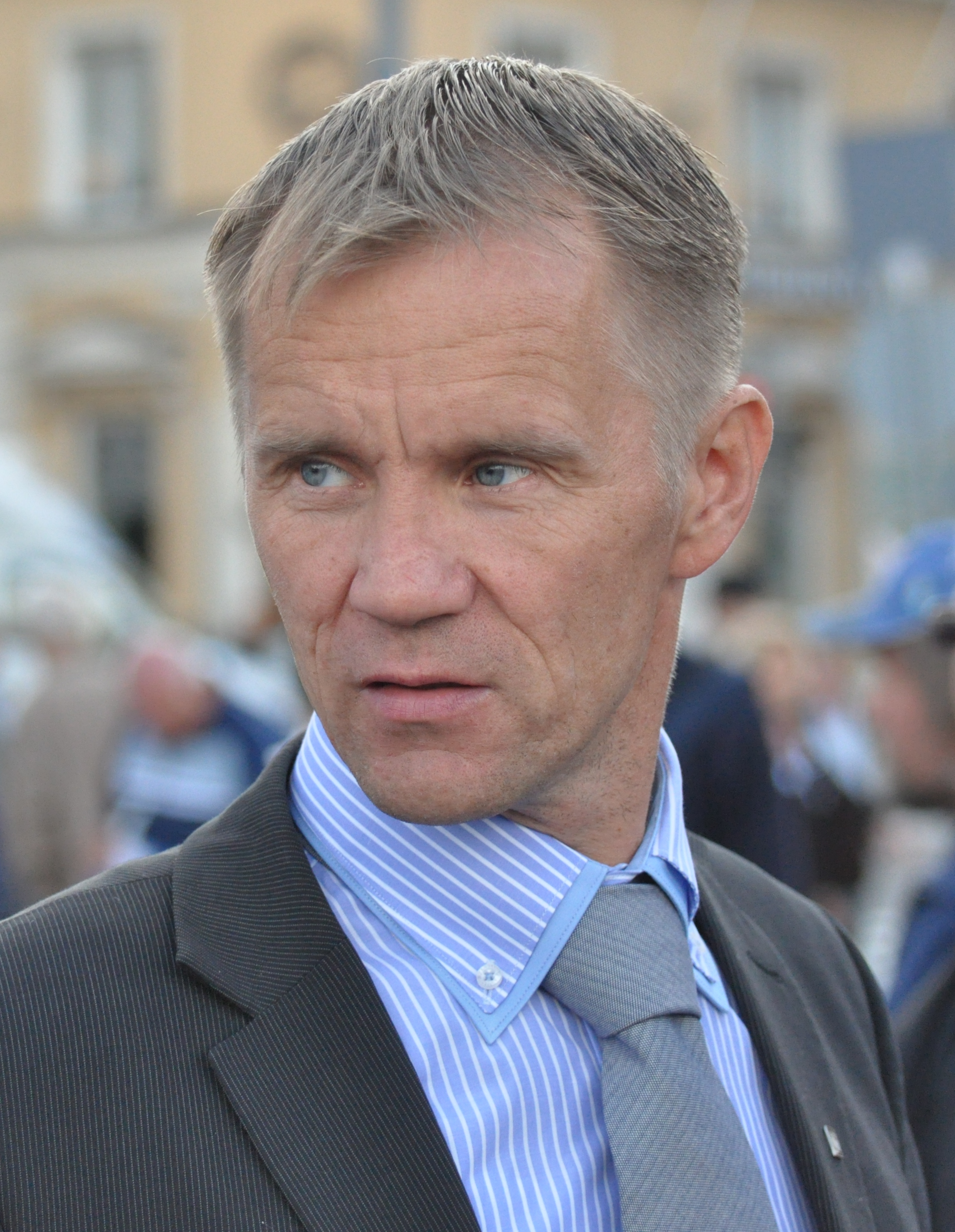

Member of Finnish Parliament for Uusimaa
- Incumbent
- Assumed office 20 April 2011

Personal details
- Born: January 20, 1967 (age 59) Lahti, Päijät-Häme, Finland
- Party: The Finns Party
- Website: http://www.mikaniikko.fi

Mika Niikko (born 20 January 1967 in Lahti) is a Finnish politician and member of Finnish Parliament for Uusimaa, representing the Finns Party. He was elected to Finnish Parliament in 2011. He is the managing director of Takaisin elämään registered society (Back to life), which works with young people. His first job was as an electrician. In 1991 he established a lock repair company and then a company which sold windows to balconies. In 2000, he started publishing gospel music with Petri Kosonen.

He has been a member of the city council of Vantaa since 2009.
