= Ozan Yanar =

Finnish politician (born 1987)

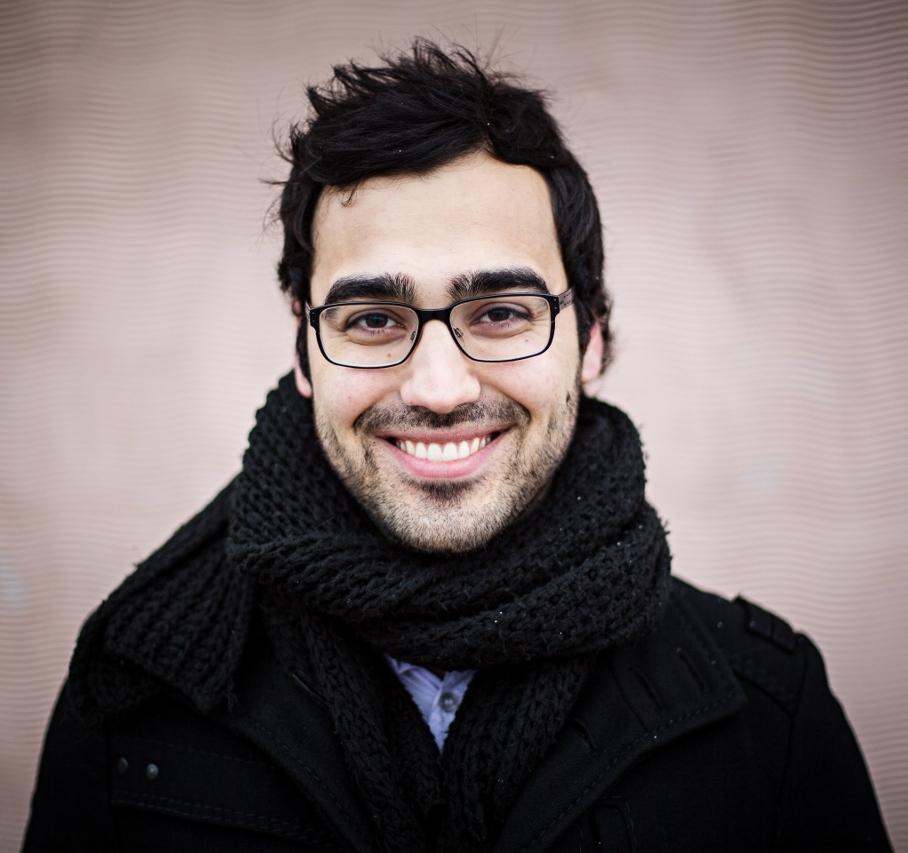
- Yanar in 2014

Member of the Finnish Parliament
- In office 22 April 2015 – 16 April 2019

Personal details
- Born: Ozan Göksu Yanar; 3 May 1987 (age 39) Istanbul, Turkey
- Citizenship: Finland, Turkey
- Party: Green League
- Education: University of Helsinki
- Website: ozan.fi

Ozan Göksu Yanar (born 3 May 1987) is a Finnish politician and a former Member of the Finnish Parliament, representing the Green League. He has been the chairman of the Federation of Green Youth and Students since 2015.

== Early life ==
Yanar was born on 3 May 1987 in Istanbul, Turkey. He attended the University of Helsinki.

== Career ==
Ozan Yanar introduces himself at the Greens of Finland party conference, Oulu, 2015.

Yanar was elected to the Parliament in the 2015 election, with 4,196 votes, taking office on 22 April 2015. He took part in the 2019 election but was not re-elected, and left office on 16 April 2019.
