= Kari Uotila =

Finnish politician

Kari Antero Uotila (born 4 January 1955 in Pertunmaa) is a Finnish politician and member of Finnish Parliament, representing the Left Alliance. He has been member of parliament two times: 1995-2007 and since 2008.
