= Hanna Halmeenpää =

Finnish biologist and politician (born 1976)

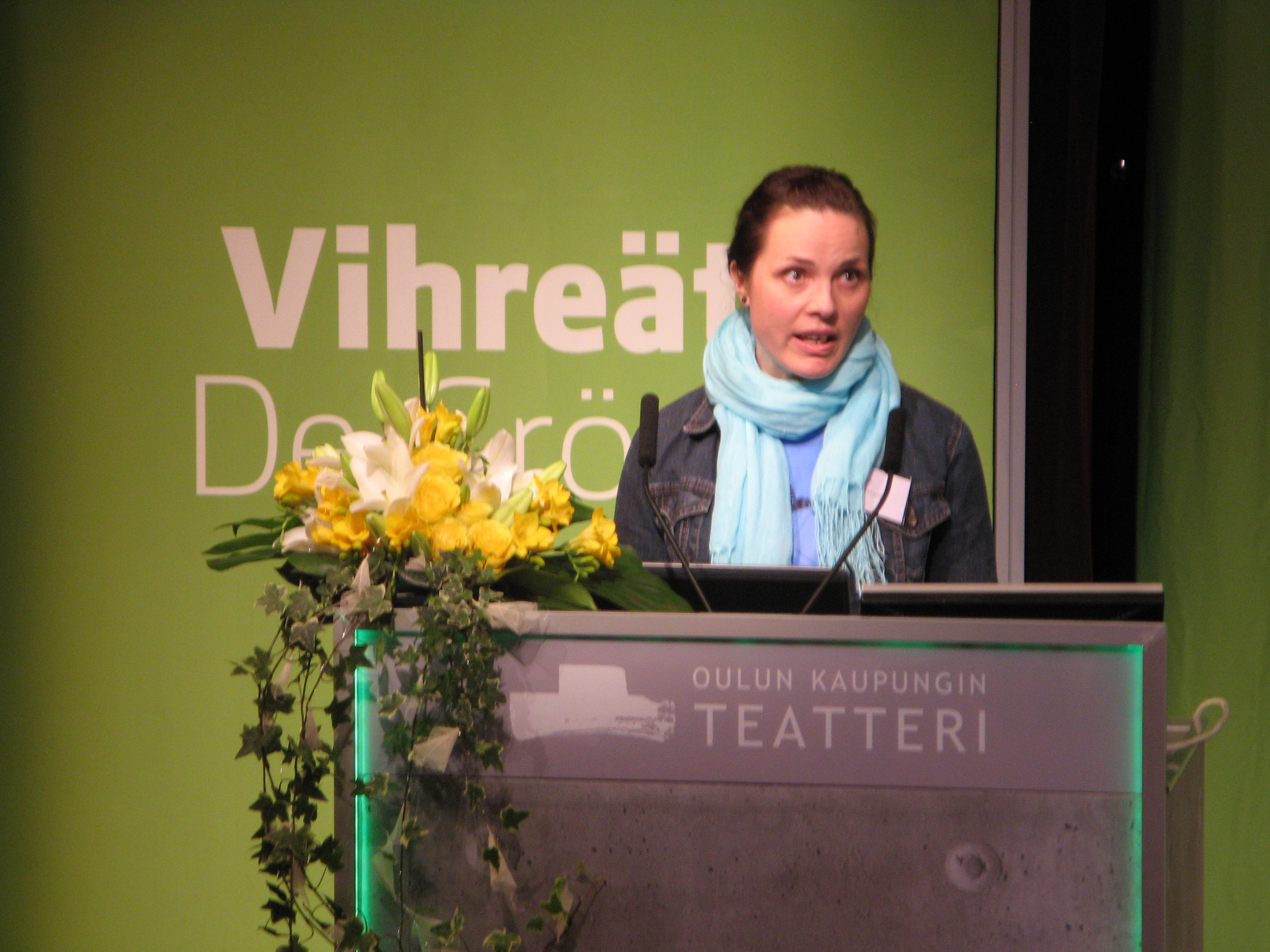

Member of the Finnish Parliament
- Incumbent
- Assumed office 22 April 2015

Personal details
- Born: 7 March 1976 (age 50) Oulu, Finland
- Party: Green League

Hanna Maaret Halmeenpää (born 7 March 1976) is a Finnish politician, representing the Green League in the Parliament of Finland since 2015. She was elected to the Parliament from the Oulu constituency in 2015 with 4,860 votes.

Halmenpää has also served in the City Council of Kalajoki since 2008. In 2012 municipal elections she got the most votes in the city.
