= Jaana Laitinen-Pesola =

Finnish politician

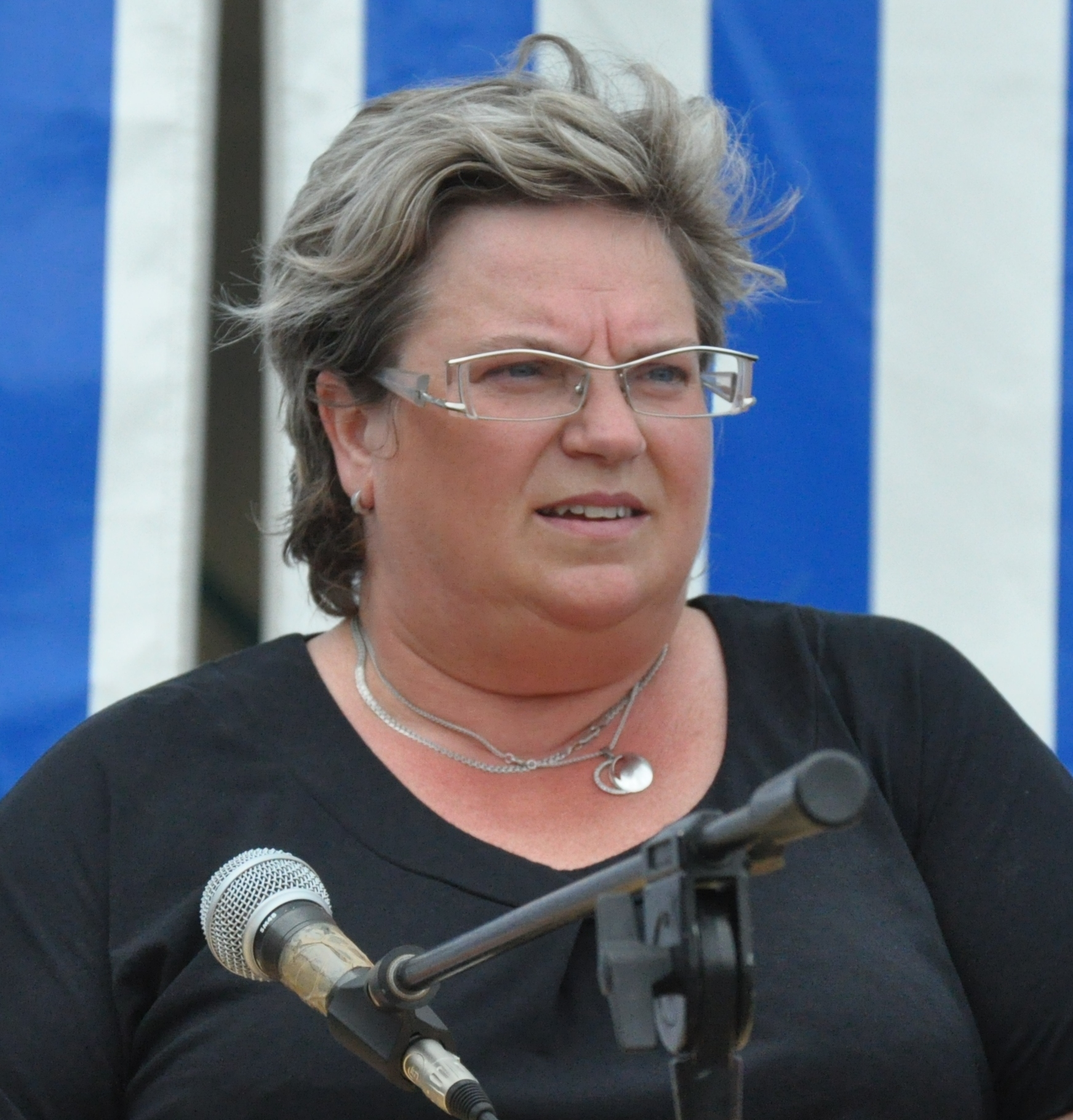
Jaana Laitinen-Pesola in 2010.

Jaana Laitinen-Pesola (born 6 September 1958) is a Finnish politician and a member of the Finnish Parliament, representing the National Coalition Party. Laitinen-Pesola was born in Pori, and was elected to the parliament in 2015, gaining 3,483 votes in the elections. She was the chairman of Tehy 1997–2013.
