= Kari Tolvanen =

Finnish politician

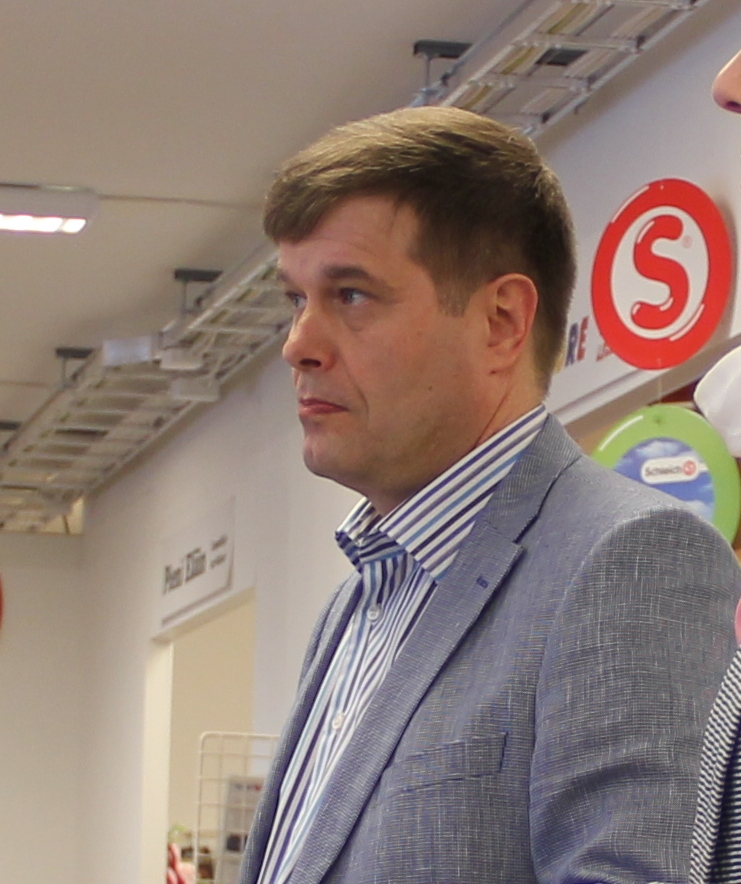

Member of the Finnish Parliament for Uusimaa

Personal details
- Born: 24 July 1961 (age 64) Helsinki, Uusimaa, Finland
- Party: National Coalition Party

Kari Tapani Tolvanen (born 24 July 1961, in Helsinki) is a Finnish politician currently serving in the Parliament of Finland for the National Coalition Party at the Uusimaa constituency.
