= Martti Talja =

Finnish politician

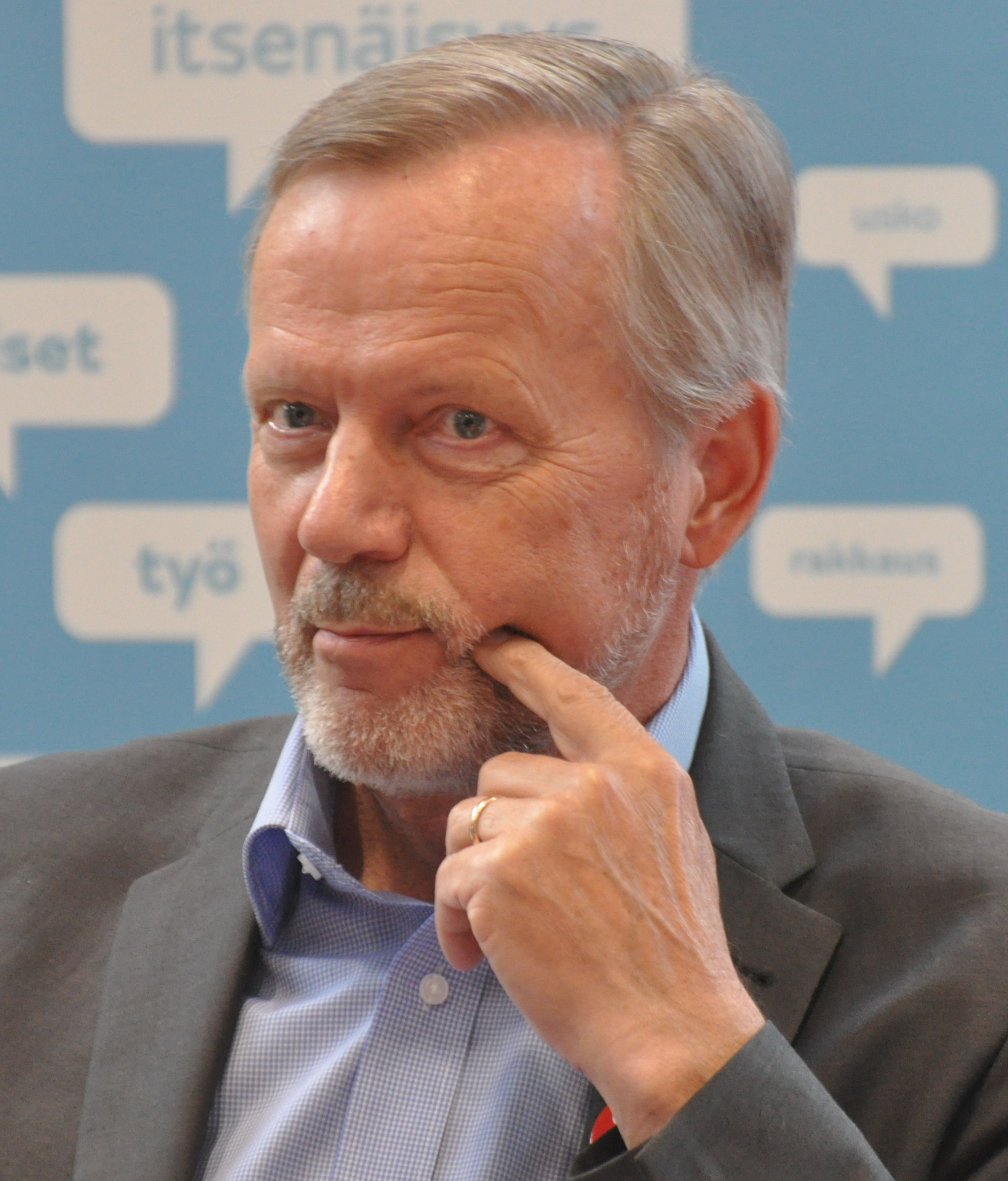

Member of the Finnish Parliament
- Incumbent
- Assumed office 22 April 2015

Personal details
- Born: 29 July 1951 (age 74) Lahti, Finland
- Party: Centre Party

Martti Talja (born 29 July 1951 in Lahti, Finland) is a Finnish politician, representing the Centre Party in the Parliament of Finland since 2015. He was elected to the Parliament from the Tavastia constituency in the 2015 elections with 3,941 votes.
