= Esko Kiviranta =

Finnish politician (born 1950)

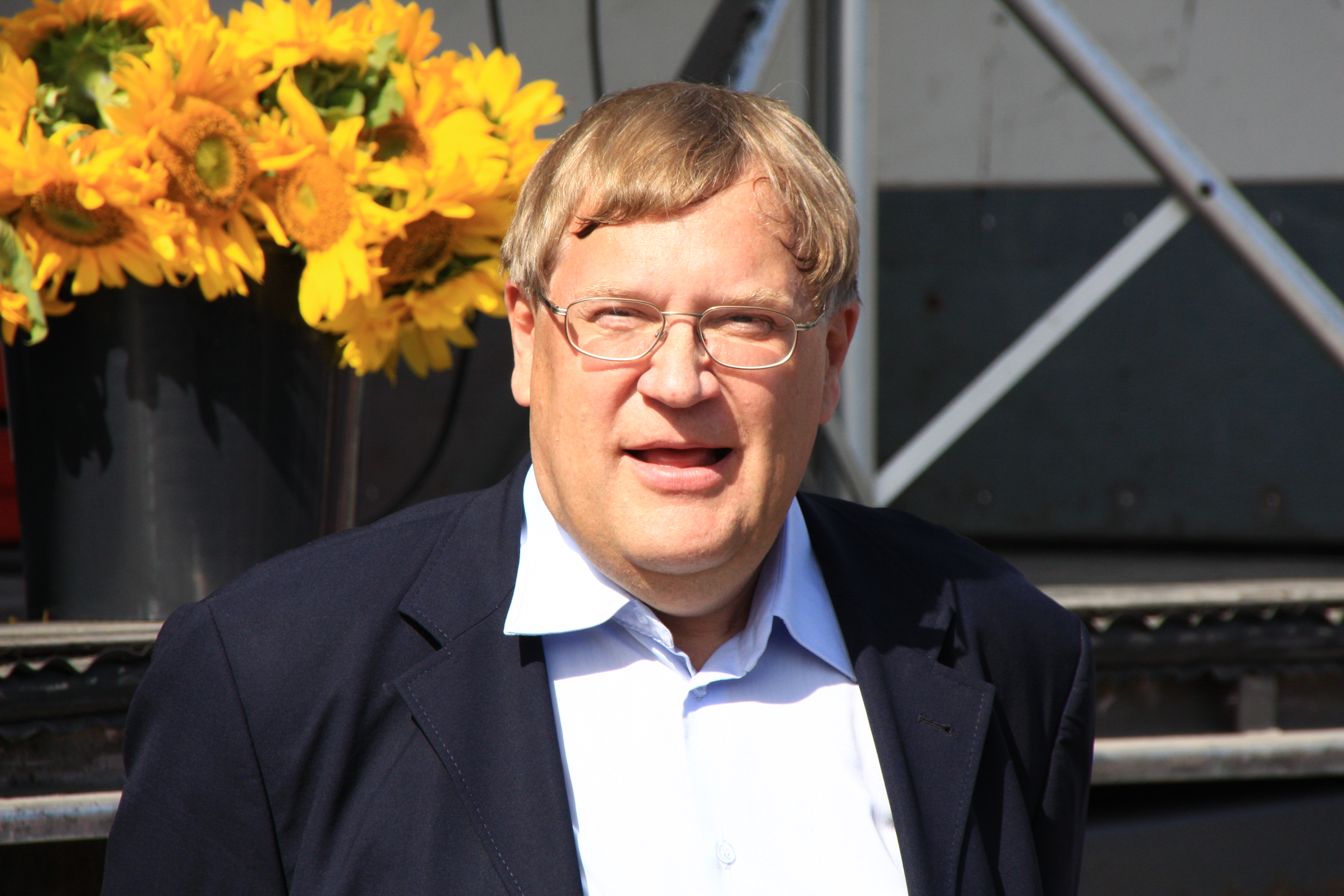
- Esko Kiviranta in 2008

Member of the Finnish Parliament
- In office 19 March 2003 – 4 April 2023
- Constituency: Varsinais-Suomi

Personal details
- Born: Esko Emil Kiviranta; September 5, 1950 (age 76) Sauvo, Finland
- Party: Centre Party
- Education: University of Helsinki
- Website: https://www.eskokiviranta.fi/

Esko Emil Kiviranta (born 2 September 1950) was a Finnish politician representing the Finnish Centre Party (Keskusta). He was a member of the Finnish Parliament from 19 March 2003 to 4 April 2023.

Kiviranta was born in Sauvo. He holds a Master of Science in Agriculture and Forestry 1974 (University of Helsinki) and a Master of Laws 1979 (University of Helsinki).
