= Susanna Koski =

Finnish politician (born 1985)

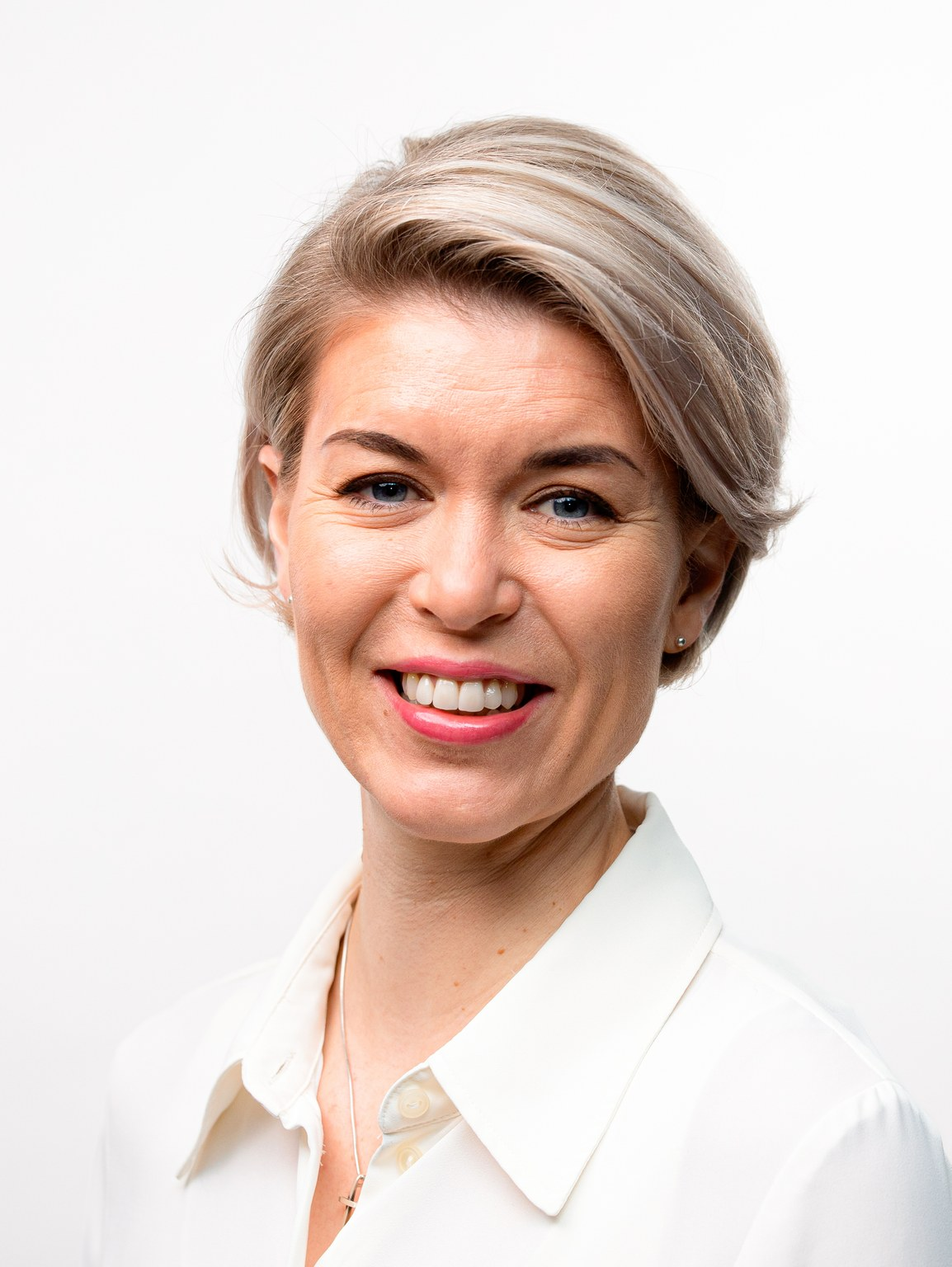
Susanna Koski in 2023.

Susanna Koski (born 22 March 1985 in Vähäkyrö) is a Finnish politician and a former member of the Finnish Parliament, representing the National Coalition Party. Koski was elected to the parliament in 2015, gaining 3,102 votes in the elections. She has also been a member of the City Council of Vaasa since 2012.
