= Martti Mölsä =

Finnish politician

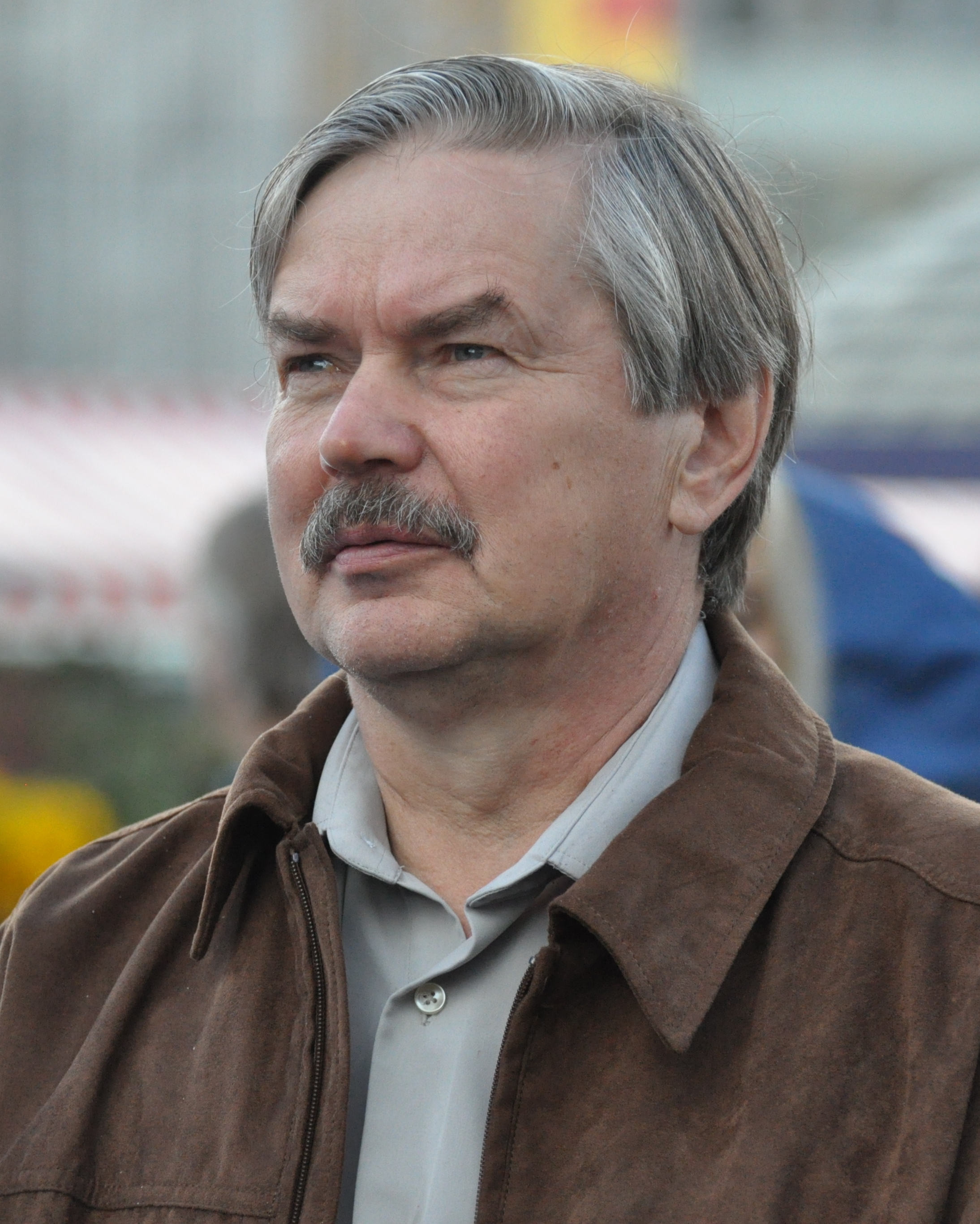

Member of the Finnish Parliament
- In office 20 April 2011 – 16 April 2019
- Constituency: Pirkanmaa

Personal details
- Born: 2 April 1952 (age 73)
- Party: Blue Reform (2017–); Finns Party (until 2017)

Martti Kullervo Mölsä (born 2 April 1952 in Kihniö, Finland) is a Finnish politician. He was first elected to parliament in 2011, representing the Finns Party. Reelected in 2015, as a member of the Finns Party, Mölsä and 19 others established the New Alternative parliamentary group on 13 June 2017, which later became Blue Reform.
