= Eeva-Johanna Eloranta =

Finnish politician

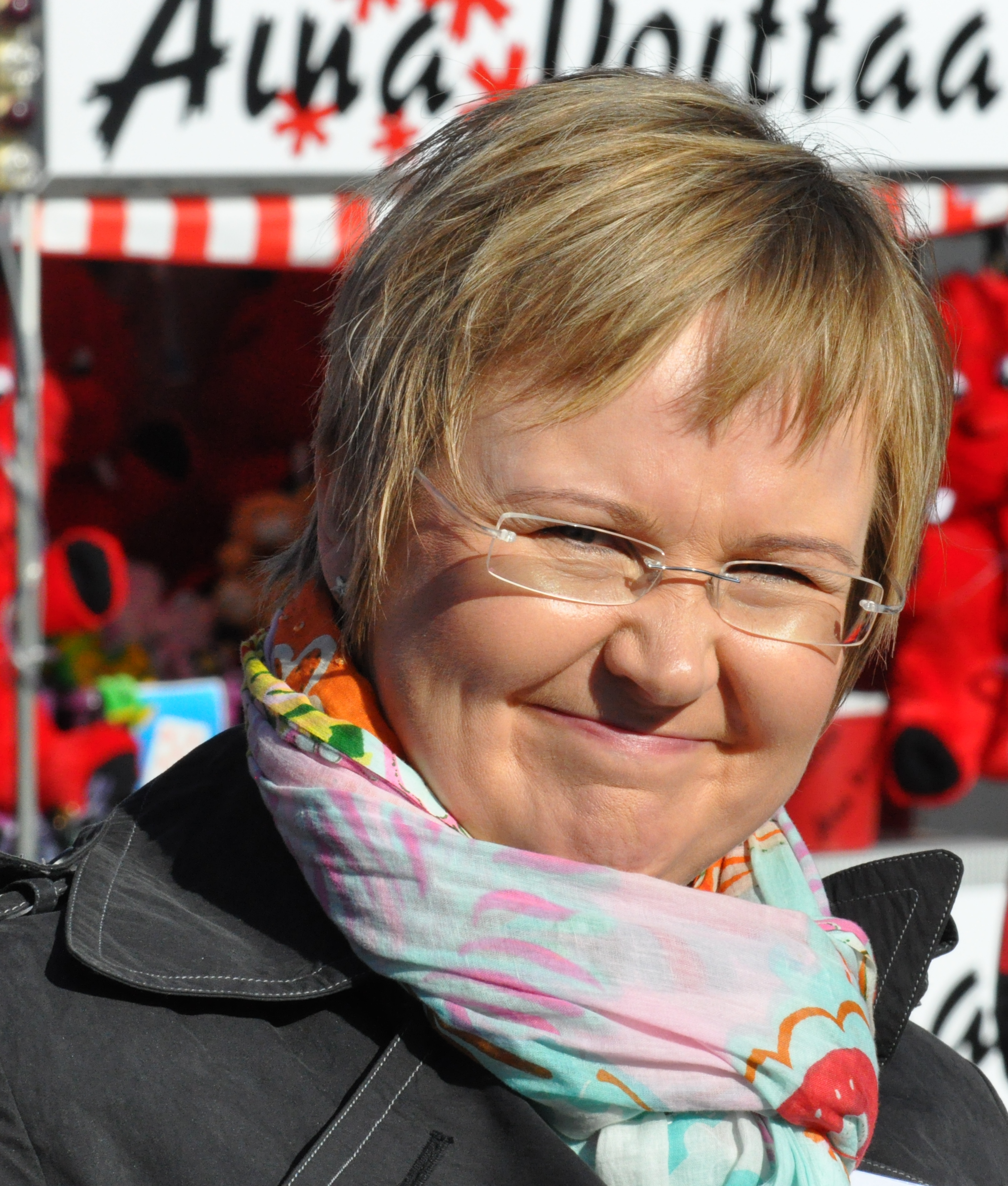
- Eloranta in 2011

Member of the Finnish Parliament for Finland Proper

Personal details
- Born: March 4, 1966 (age 60) Turku, Southwest Finland, Finland
- Party: Social Democratic Party of Finland

Eeva-Johanna Eloranta (born 4 March 1966 in Turku) is a Finnish politician currently serving in the Parliament of Finland for the Social Democratic Party of Finland at the Finland Proper constituency.
