= Johanna Karimäki =

Finnish politician (born 1973)

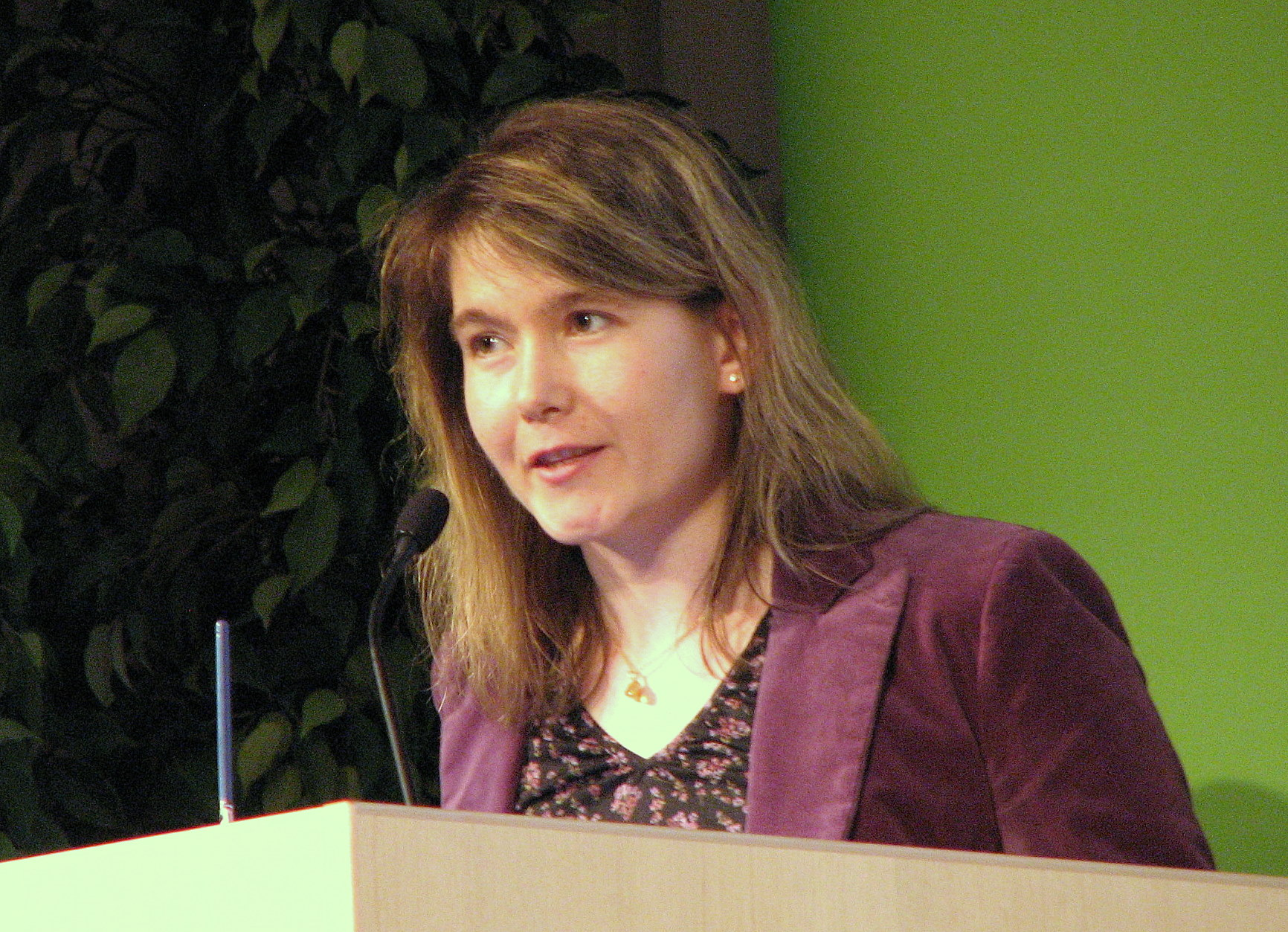
- Incumbent
- Assumed office March 2007

Personal details
- Party: Green League

Johanna Karimäki (born 20 March 1973 in Geneva) is a Finnish politician representing the Green League. She was elected to the Finnish Parliament in the parliamentary election of March 2007. She has also been a member of the municipal council of Espoo since 2005.
