= Kalle Jokinen =

Finnish politician

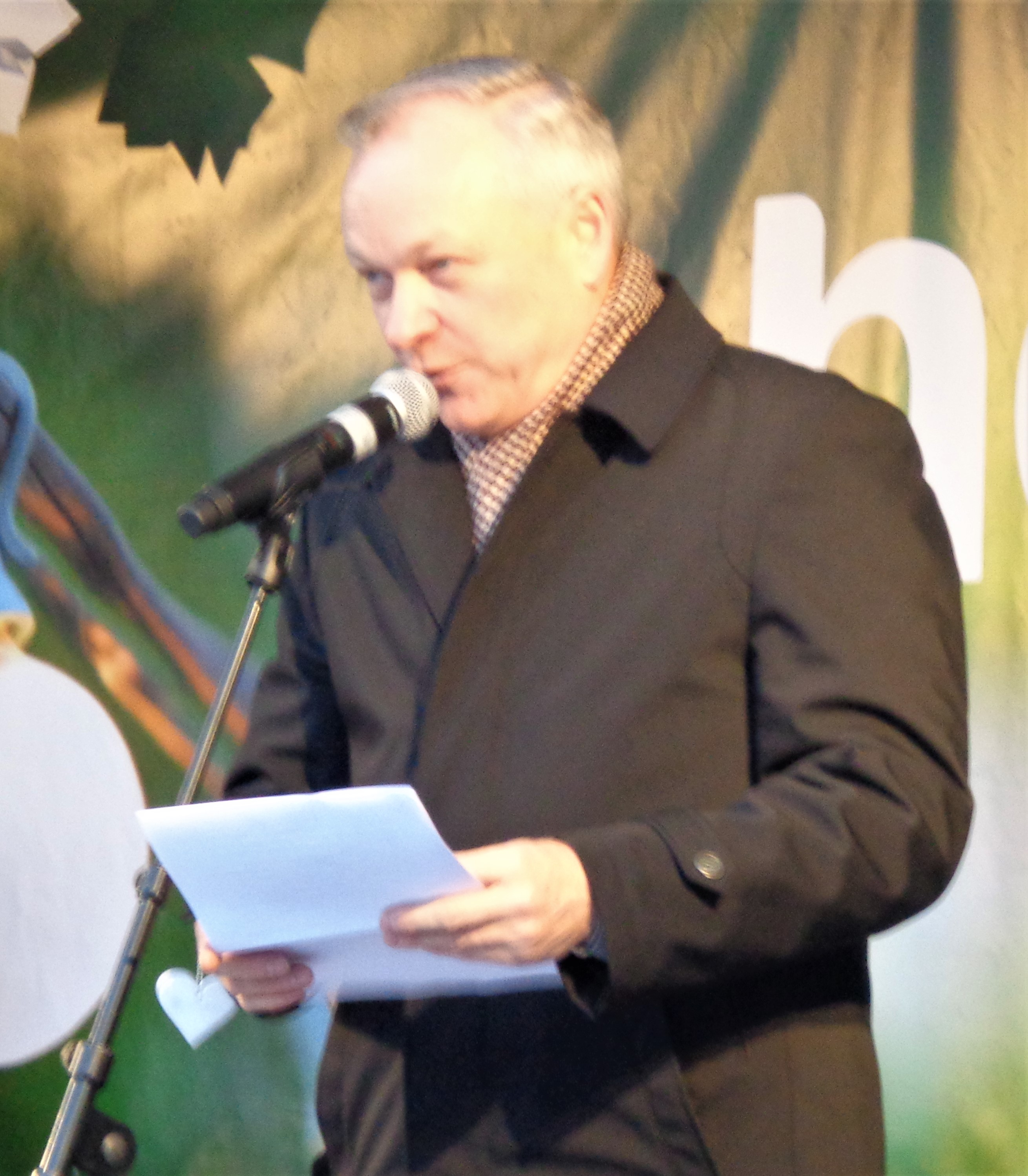
Jokinen in 2017

Kalle Johannes Jokinen (born August 7, 1961, in Koski Hl.) is a Finnish politician and a member of the Finnish Parliament, representing the National Coalition Party. Jokinen did first seek a parliamentary seat in the 2007 parliamentary election, but was not elected with 4,283 votes. He rose to the parliament as a substitute in September 2009, when MP Jari Koskinen left his seat in the parliament. Jokinen was elected in 2011 and 2015 elections.

On 21 June 2016, Jokinen was chosen as the chairman of the National Coalition Party's parliamentary group.
