= Maria Tolppanen =

Finnish politician

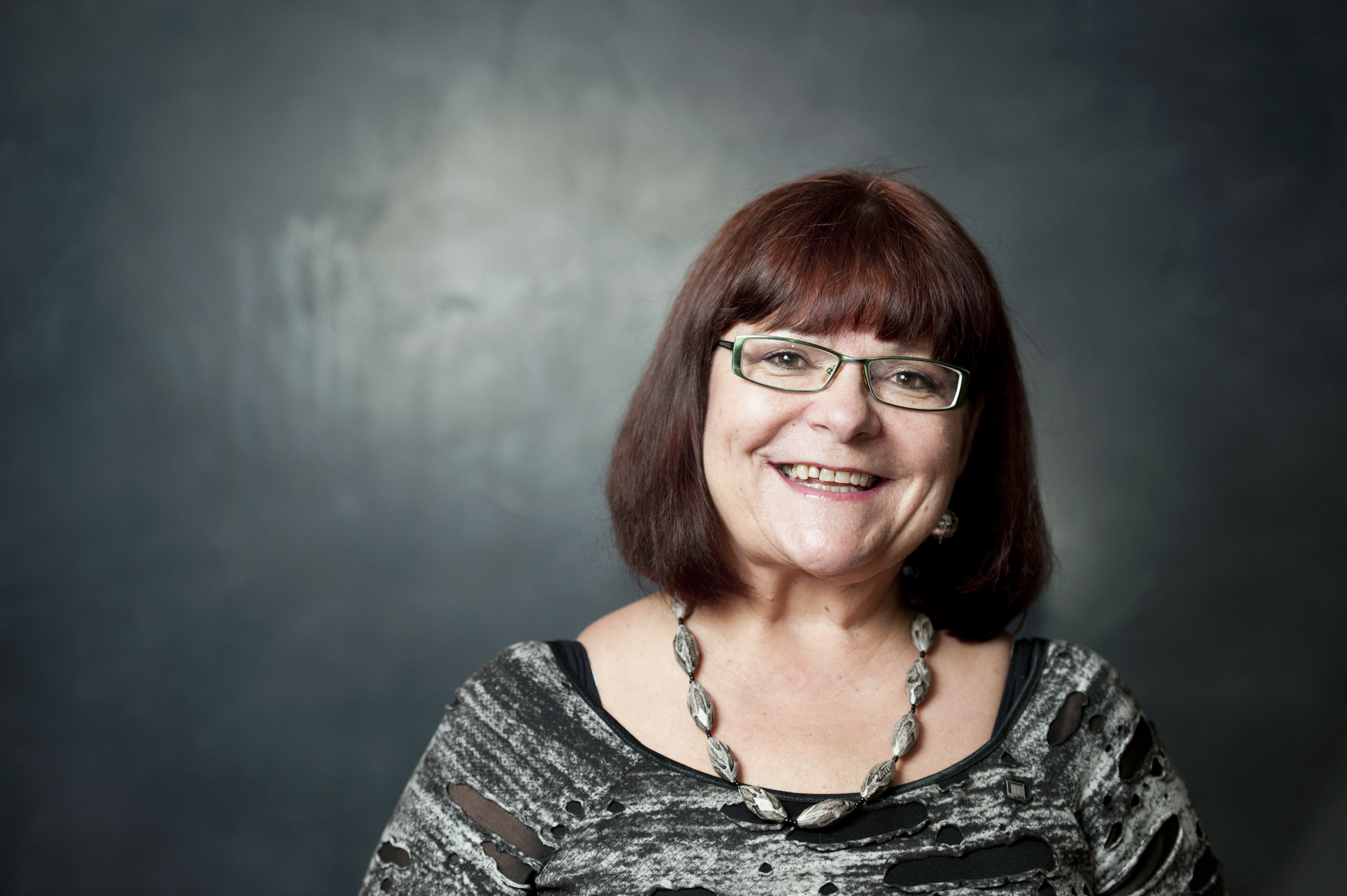

Member of the Finnish Parliament
- Incumbent
- Assumed office 20 April 2011
- Constituency: Vaasa

Personal details
- Born: 24 November 1952 (age 73) Kemi, Finland
- Party: SDP 2016– Finns Party 2011–2016

Eeva Maria Tolppanen (born 24 November 1952) is a Finnish politician, representing the Social Democratic Party in the Parliament of Finland. She has served in the Parliament since 2011 and in the City Council of Vaasa since 2013. Tolppanen formerly represented the Finns Party and got elected to the Parliament twice as a member of the party, but switched to the SDP in 2016.
