= Christina Gestrin =

Finnish politician

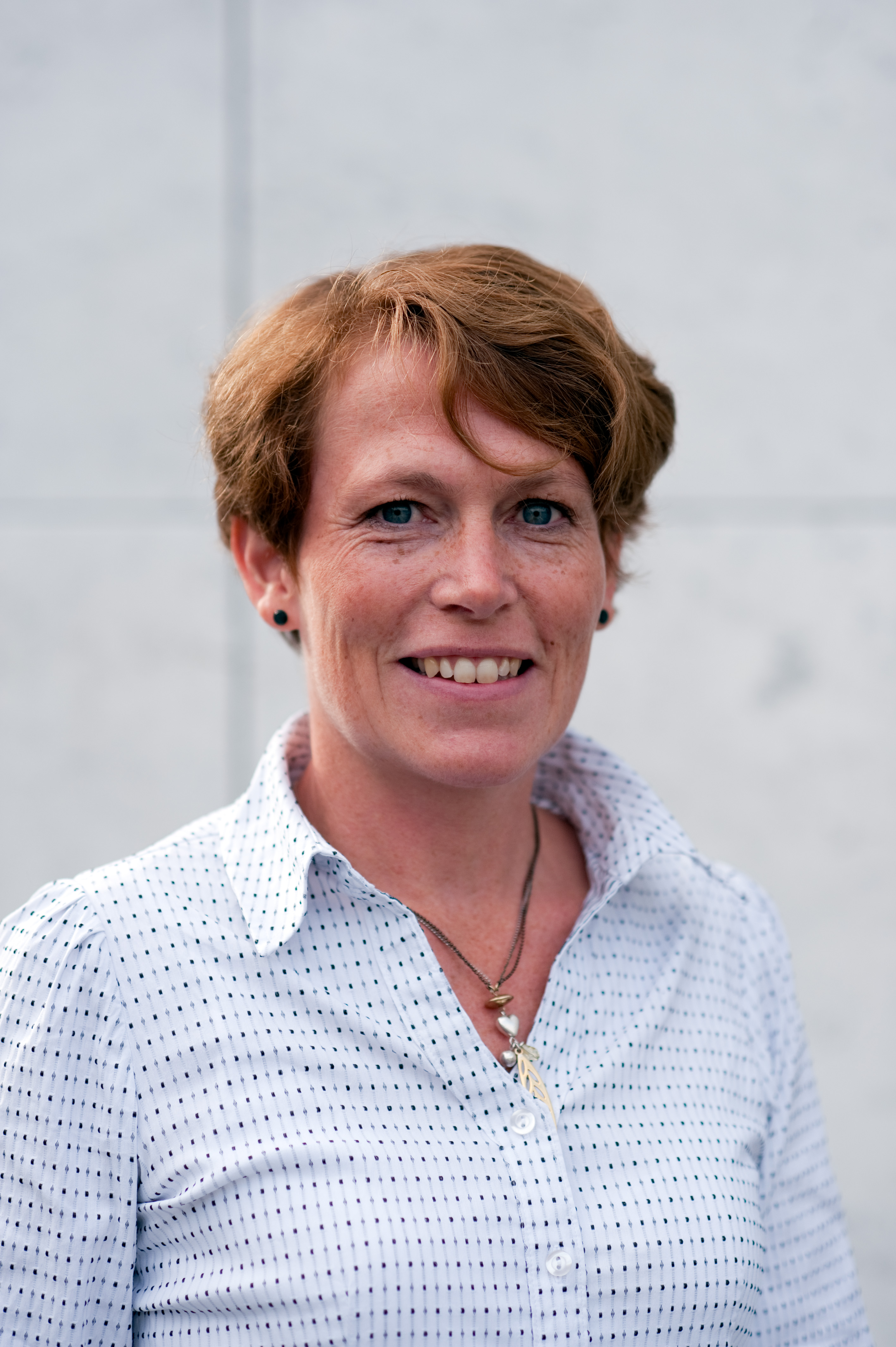

Member of Parliament
- In office 2000–2015
- Constituency: Uusimaa

Personal details
- Born: 12 January 1967 (age 59) Helsinki, Finland
- Party: Swedish People's Party of Finland
- Children: 3

Anna Christina Gestrin (born 12 January 1967 in Helsinki) is a Finnish politician, former park ranger, Member of Parliament from 2000 to 2015 and former vice chairman of the Swedish People's Party of Finland (1998-2005).

Gestrin lives on an estate in Espoo. She is married and has three daughters.
