= Eero Suutari =

Finnish politician

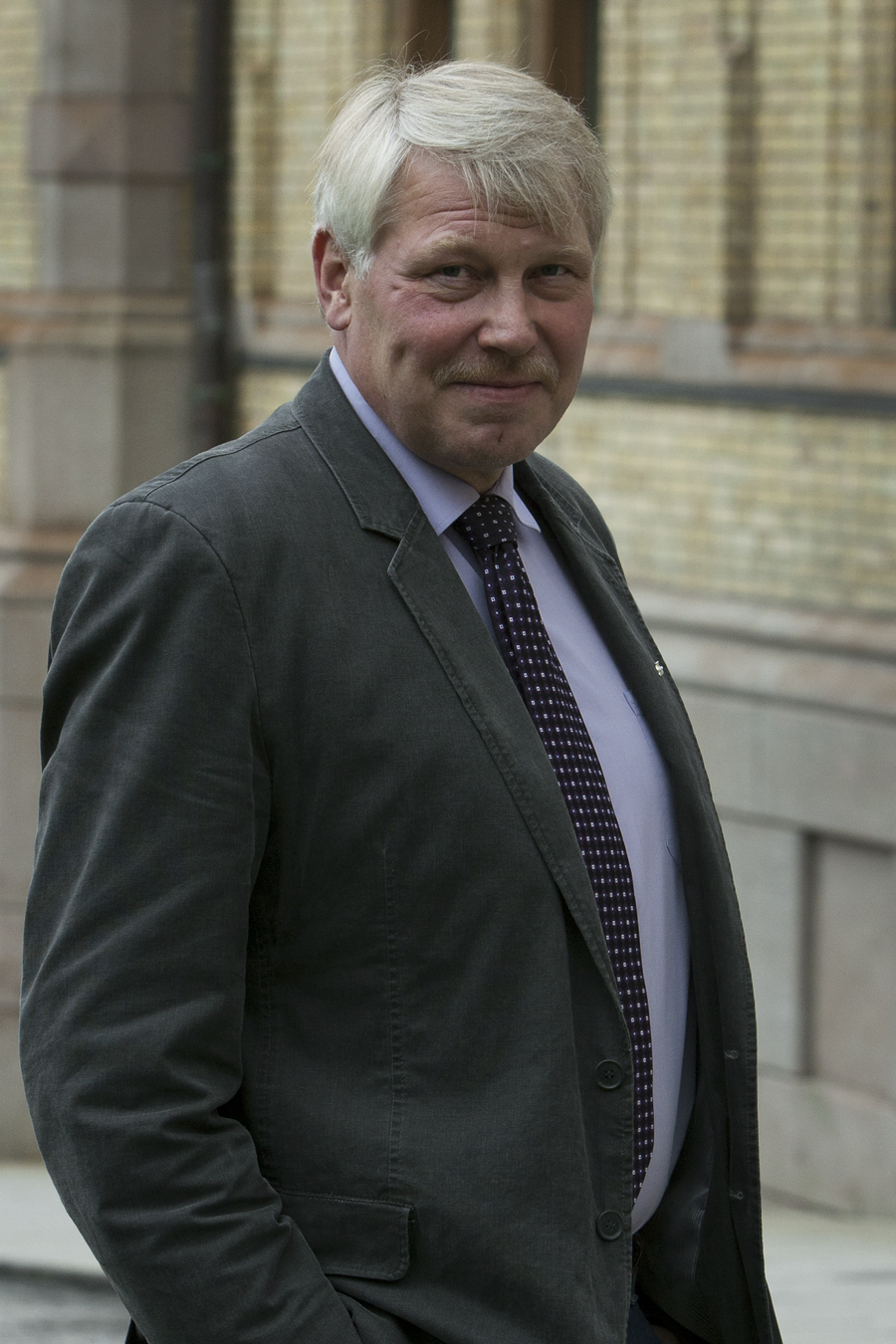

Member of the Finnish Parliament
- Incumbent
- Assumed office 20 April 2011

Personal details
- Born: 27 December 1956 (age 69) Sotkamo, Finland
- Party: National Coalition Party

Eero Johannes Suutari (born 27 December 1956) is a Finnish politician, who has represented the National Coalition Party in the Parliament of Finland since 2011. He was born in Sotkamo, and was elected to the Parliament from the Oulu constituency in 2011 with 3,495 votes and again in 2015 with 3,303 votes.
