= Seppo Lahtela =

Finnish politician (born 1947)

Seppo Tapio Lahtela (born 16 June 1947) is a Finnish farmer and politician. He was born in Vehkalahti and was a Member of the Parliament of Finland, representing the Centre Party from 1999 to 2006 and the National Coalition Party from 2006 to 2007.
