= Reijo Hongisto =

Finnish politician

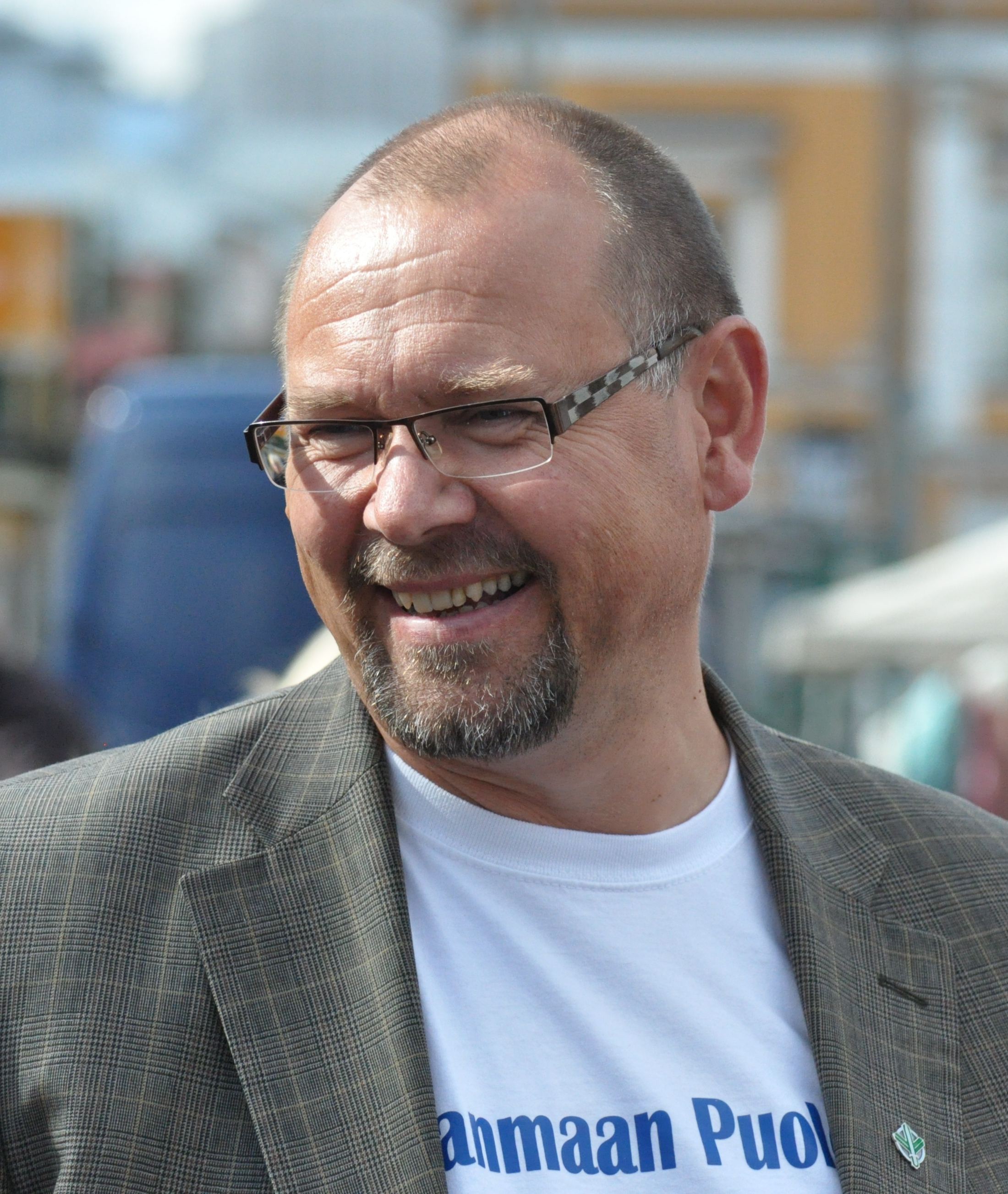
Reijo Hongisto in August 2011

Reijo Henrik Hongisto (born 16 April 1962 in Alajärvi) is a Finnish policeman and politician. He is a member of the Parliament of Finland since 2011, representing the Finns Party 2011–2017. On 13 June 2017, Hongisto and 19 others left the Finns Party parliamentary group to found the New Alternative parliamentary group.
