= List of Finnish MPs =

This is a list of MPs, Members of the Finnish Parliament. The list contains Parliamentary groups. An individual MP could be a member of more than one parliamentary group due to defection or break up of a political party.

== Agrarian League / Centre Party ==
=== 1900s and 1910s ===
- Santeri Alkio (1907–1908, 1909–1914, 1917–1922) (defected from Young Finnish Party group)
- Kusti Arhama (1917–1930, 1933–1945)
- Ilmari Auer (1929–1930)
- Kustavi Elovaara (1919–1922)
- Jalmari Haapanen (1917)
- Santeri Haapanen (1917–1919)
- Frans Hanhisalo (1919–1921)
- Eero Hatva (1910–1914, 1917–1929)
- John Hedberg (1908–1910, 1911–1917)
- Juho Heikkinen (1907–1911, 1917–1922)
- Pekka Heikkinen (1919–1922, 1924–1940)
- Juho Heimonen (1908–1909)
- Janne Ihamuotila (1924–1929)
- Toivo Ikonen (1933–1939, 1942–1951)
- Vilkku Joukahainen (1917–1924)
- Antti Junes (1910–1914, 1919–1933, 1936–1945)
- Antti Juutilainen (1917–1930)
- Kalle Jäykkä (1914–1917)
- Kustaa Adolf Kakriainen
- Kyösti Kallio (1907–1937)
- Otto Karhi (1907–1908, 1909–1914)
- Heikki Kiiskinen (1907–1908)
- Olli Kiiskinen
- Yrjö Kiuru (1911–1917)
- Väinö Kivilinna (1922–1924)
- Janne Koivuranta (1919–1945, 1948–1951)
- Juho Kokko (1914–1922)
- Antti Kukkonen (1919–1945, 1954–1962)
- Lauri Kuoppamäki (1917)
- Frans Kärki (1919–1927)
- Oskari Lahdensuo (1910–1919)
- Artturi Laitinen (1909–1910)
- Ivar Lantto (1908–1909, 1917–1919)
- Matti Latvala (1909–1917, 1919–1922)
- Antero Leinola (1909–1914)
- Mikko Leinonen
- Bertta Leppälä (1917–1922)
- Juhani Leppälä (1907–1908, 1919–1922, 1927–1951)
- Niilo Liakka (1919–1922)
- Kalle Lohi (1909–1945)
- Jaakko Loppi (1919–1922)
- Jaakko Loukko (1918–1924) (defected from Finnish Party group)
- Mikko Luopajärvi (1914–1920)
- Tilda Löthman-Koponen
- Albin Manner (1917–1927, 1929–1933)
- Henrik Niskanen (1919–1924)
- Juho Niukkanen (1917–1933, 1936–1954)
- Kalle Nurmela (1914–1919)
- Matti Oja (1919–1922)
- Esko Oranen (1910–1914)
- Oskari Partanen (1914–1917)
- Eero Yrjö Pehkonen (1914–1918)
- Lauri Perälä (1919–1924)
- Aarno Pesonen (1919–1924)
- Yrjö Pesonen (1919–1922)
- Mikko Piitulainen (1919–1922, 1924–1927)
- Simson Pilkka (1919–1924, 1929–1930)
- Ari Pitkänen (1919–1922)
- Matti Poutiainen (1908–1917)
- Salomo Pulkkinen (1911–1917)
- Erkki Pullinen (1930–1933)
- Kalle Kustaa Pykälä (1907–1915)
- August Raatikainen
- Lauri Kristian Relander (1910–1914, 1917–1920)
- Antti Rentola (1917–1919)
- Juho Ryynänen (1919–1933)
- Hilma Räsänen (1907–1908)
- Filip Saalasti (1910–1917)
- Pekka Saarelainen (1914–1922, 1924–1930)
- Aleksis Salovaara (1917–1919)
- Wäinö Selander (1919–1922)
- Eetu Takkula (1917–1922)
- Pekka Tanskanen (1917–1919)
- Heikki Taskinen (1919–1922)
- Juho Torppa (1927–1929)
- Elias Tukia (1924–1948)
- Juho Tulikoura (1914–1917) (defected from Young Party group)
- Lauri Tuunanen (1907–1910)
- Karl Gustaf Veijola (1908–1909)
- Vihtori Vesterinen (1919–1951)
- Artur Wuorimaa (1917–1921)
- Otto Åkesson (1922–1924)
- Anna Ängeslevä (1908–1909)

=== 1920s and 1930s ===
- Eemeli Aakula (1930–1936)
- Eino Aaltio (1929)
- Samppa Aittoniemi (1933–1936, 1948–1958)
- Anshelm Alestalo (1923–1939, 1945–1948)
- Jussi Annala (1930–1939, 1945–1951)
- Albin Asikainen (1929–1948)
- Akseli Brander (1933–1951)
- Kaarle Ellilä (1929–1930, 1932–1936)
- Hannes Eskola
- Aleksi Hakala
- Antti Halonen
- Matti Hannula (1929–1930)
- Uuno Hannula
- Yrjö Hautala (1945–1958, 1962–1966)
- Kustaa Hautamäki (1922–1924)
- Eino Heikura (1924–1927, 1951–1958)
- Veikko Heiskanen
- Lennart Heljas
- Olli Hirvensalo (1922–1924, 1930–1951)
- Salomon Hongisto
- Ville Honkavaara (1922–1924)
- Kaapro Huittinen
- Kaarlo Hurme (1924–1929)
- Väinö Huuhtanen
- Juho Hyvönen (1922–1924)
- Kaarlo Hänninen (1924–1939)
- Aapo Inkinen
- Toivo Janhonen (1924–1939)
- Kalle Joukanen (1930–1932, 1936–1945, 1948–1954)
- Eetu Jussila (1929–1930, 1931–1933)
- Emil Jutila
- Juho Kaakinen (1937–1938)
- Väinö Kaasalainen (1933–1936, 1951–1954)
- Lauri Kaijalainen
- Jukka Kailio (1938–1939)
- Viljami Kalliokoski (1922–1945, 1948–1962)
- Juho Kankkunen (1922–1924)
- Pekka Kankkunen
- Juho Kanniainen (1922–1924)
- Sanfrid Kariniva (1927–1930)
- Einari Karvetti
- Antti Kaura
- Jooseppi Kauranen (1922–1935)
- Urho Kekkonen (1936–1956)
- Antti Kemppi
- Pentti Kiiskinen (1938–1939)
- Kalle Kirra (1922–1930, 1936–1948)
- Vilho Kirveskoski
- Vilho Kivioja
- Kauno Kleemola (1939–1945, 1948–1965)
- Juho Koivisto (1927–1951)
- Oskari Kontio (1924–1933)
- Pekka Kopsa (1922–1929)
- Johannes Korhonen (1930–1933)
- Antti Kuisma (1922–1929, 1930–1933, 1935–1936)
- Kalle Kämäräinen (1930–1945, 1954–1962)
- Jalo Lahdensuo (1921–1938)
- Matti Lahtela
- Emil Lampinen (1930–1936, 1939–1954)
- Emil Lautala (1924–1933)
- Artturi Leinonen (1936–1939, 1944–1945)
- Matti Luoma-aho
- Aino Luostarinen (1927–1930, 1936–1953)
- Alpo Luostarinen (1930–1936)
- Eemil Luukka (1936–1966)
- Matti Makkonen (1922–1927)
- Jalmari Malmi (1921–1922)
- Aleksanteri Mero (1920–1922)
- Matti Miikki
- Kaarlo Mikkola
- Valtteri Mikonmäki (1927–1933)
- Lauri Murtomaa (1939–1955)
- Lauri Mustakallio (1922–1924, 1927–1930)
- Wäinö Mäkinen (1922–1924)
- Kalle Määttä
- Matti Niilekselä
- Heikki Niskanen (1941–1945) (defected from Small Farmers' Party / Party of the Small Farmers' and the Rural People)
- Eero Nurmesniemi (1927–1933, 1936–1945)
- Matts Paavilainen (1927–1929)
- Juho Paksujalka (1933–1936, 1939–1948)
- Eino Palovesi (1939–1960)
- Niilo Pelttari (1924–1927)
- Heikki Peura (1920–1922)
- Juho Pilppula (1927–1948)
- Matti Pitkänen (1922–1936, 1939–1945)
- Juho Pyörälä (1939–1948)
- Matti Pärssinen (1939–1948)
- Antti Rantamaa (1939–1962)
- Tyko Reinikka (1922–1930)
- Olli Pekka Rissanen (1930–1933)
- Paavo Ruotsalainen (1929–1933)
- Eino Rytinki (1941–1945, 1949–1958) (defected from Small Farmers' Party / Party of the Small Farmers' and the Rural People)
- Paavo Saarinen (1924–1933)
- Antti Sallinen (1922–1924, 1930–1933)
- Sulo Salo (1922–1929, 1930–1950)
- Lauri Sariola (1929–1930, 1933–1939)
- Tauno Saukkonen (1939–1948)
- Yrjö Schildt (1939–1945)
- Jaakko Seppänen (1922–1927)
- Heikki Soininen (1933–1957)
- Juho Sunila (1922–1927, 1929–1933)
- Anton Suurkonka (1930–1936, 1939–1945, 1948–1951)
- Juho Takala (1933–1939, 1940–1945)
- Mikko Tarkkanen (1922–1945, 1951–1954)
- Matti Tolppanen (1936–1945)
- Eino Tuomivaara (1924–1930)
- Jaakko Vainio (1922–1924)
- Vilho Vallas (1929–1930, 1933–1939)
- Heikki Vehkaoja (1924–1939, 1945–1948)
- Viljo Venho (1933–1939)
- Anttoni Vertanen (1924–1930)
- Taavi Vilhula (1929–1930, 1933–1954)
- Uuno Virranniemi (1939–1945)
- Bjarne Westermarck (1922–1923)

=== 1940s and 1950s ===
- Toivo Antila (1951–1970)
- Eeli Erkkilä (1951–1973)
- Kusti Eskola (1945–1962)
- Erland Haapaniemi (1948–1954)
- Sylvi Halinen (1954–1970)
- Ale Holopainen (1957–1970)
- Martti Honkavaara (1957–1958)
- Leo Häppölä (1951–1970)
- Arvi Ikonen (1950–1957)
- Einari Jaakkola (1954–1966)
- Mauno Jussila (1951–1970)
- Kalle Jutila (1945)
- Artturi Jämsén (1954–1971)
- Lauri Kaarna (1951–1954)
- Nestori Kaasalainen (1951–1972)
- Aaro Kauppi (1951–1954, 1956–1958, 1963–1966)
- Matti Kekkonen (1958–1970)
- Pekka Kiiski
- Toivo Kinnunen
- Esa Koivusilta (1954–1958)
- Antti Koukkari (1945–1949)
- Urho Kähönen
- Olavi Lahtela (1958–1968)
- Marja Lahti (1954–1967)
- Lauri Laine
- Eino Laitinen
- Vilho Leivonen (1951–1954, 1962–1966)
- Lauri Leppihalme
- Matti Liinamaa (1958–1966)
- Onni Mannila (1948–1951, 1953–1954, 1955–1962)
- Aarre Marttila (1958–1961)
- Matti Mattila (1954–1975)
- Martti Miettunen (1945–1958)
- Esu Niemelä (1958–1972)
- Markus Niskala (1945–1963)
- Väinö Okko
- Akseli Paarman (1958–1966, 1969–1970)
- Hannes Paaso
- Atte Pakkanen (1948–1970)
- Eemil Partanen (1954–1972)
- Pentti Pekkarinen (1958–1975)
- Arvo Pentti (1958–1970)
- Eemil Pääkkönen (1945–1948, 1951–1954)
- Jussi Pöykkö
- Väinö Rankila (1948–1958)
- Lauri Riikonen
- Niilo Ryhtä (1948–1967)
- Erkki Ryömä (1955–1958, 1962–1966)
- Tahvo Rönkkö (1948–1972)
- Kerttu Saalasti (1948–1962, 1966–1970)
- Eero Saari (1951–1955)
- Yrjö Saari
- Toivo Salakivi (1945)
- Toivo Saloranta (1954–1958, 1960–1970, 1972–1975)
- Wiljam Sarjala (1948–1970)
- Veikko Savela (1958–1970)
- Vieno Simonen (1948–1962)
- Samuli Simula (1945–1951)
- Yrjö Sinkkonen (1954–1962, 1966–1972)
- Lauri Solla (1951–1954)
- V. J. Sukselainen (1948–1970, 1972–1979)
- Martti Suntela (1948–1951)
- Veikko Svinhufvud (1958–1966)
- Juho Tenhiälä (1966–1970)
- Ilmari Tiainen
- Kustaa Tiitu (1945–1958, 1965–1970)
- Esa Timonen (1958–1966)
- Eino Uusitalo (1955–1983)
- Veikko Vennamo (1945–1959)
- Johannes Virolainen (1945–1983, 1987–1991)
- Hilja Väänänen (1951–1966)

=== 1960s and 1970s ===
- Matti Asunmaa (1970–1979)
- Katri-Helena Eskelinen (1966–1987)
- Veikko Hanhirova (1966–1972, 1975–1979)
- Heikki Hasu (1962–1966, 1967–1970)
- Erkki Haukipuro (1966–1973)
- Veikko Honkanen (1962–1966, 1967–1970)
- Esko Härkönen (1970–1979)
- Mikko Jokela (1972–1987)
- Kauko Juhantalo (1979–1993, 1995–1999, 2003–2007, 2015–2019)
- Eero Juntunen (1962–1966)
- Katri Kaarlonen (1966–1972)
- Mikko Kaarna (1960–1962, 1966–1987)
- Orvokki Kangas (1970–1983)
- Reino Kangas (1962–1975)
- Eino Kankaanpää (1970)
- Ahti Karjalainen (1966–1979)
- Aino Karjalainen (1972–1979)
- Reino Karpola (1962–1979, 1983–1987)
- Markku Kauppinen (1979–1983)
- Olli Kervinen (1962–1966)
- Eeva Kuuskoski (1980–1995) (defected from National Coalition Party group)
- Heimo Linna (1966–1987)
- Aaro Lintilä (1962–1972)
- Eino Lottanen (1966–1975)
- Matti Maijala (1970–1972, 1975–1991)
- Mauno Manninen (1973–1983, 1983–1987)
- Olavi Martikainen (1972–1987)
- Kalevi Mattila (1975–1995)
- Einari Nieminen (1972–1991)
- Paavo Niinikoski (1966–1975)
- Lauri Palmunen (1979–1983)
- Ahti Pekkala (1970–1985)
- Mauri Pekkarinen (1979–2019)
- Esko Pekonen (1970–1972, 1975–1983)
- Mikko Pesälä (1975–1999)
- Veikko Pihlajamäki (1972–1987)
- Mauno Pohjonen (1960–1970, 1971–1972)
- Hannele Pokka (1979–1994)
- Pentti Poutanen (1970–1987)
- Väinö Raudaskoski (1975–1987)
- Matti Ruokola (1970–1975, 1979–1983)
- Paula Ruutu (1962–1966, 1967–1970)
- Eino Räsänen (1962–1970)
- Sylvi Saimo (1966–1979)
- Alvar Saukko (1975–1983)
- Juhani Saukkonen (1972–1983)
- Petter Savola (1975–1983)
- Jouko Siikaniemi (1970–1975)
- Aulis Sileäkangas (1966–1970, 1972–1975)
- Sulo Suorttanen (1962–1970, 1972–1975)
- Lea Sutinen (1970–1987)
- Eino Sääskilahti (1962–1970)
- Hannu Tenhiälä (1975–1992)
- Juhani Tuomaala (1975–1987)
- Taisto Tähkämaa (1970–1991)
- Paavo Vesterinen (1975–1987)
- Pekka Vilmi (1963–1979)
- Kyllikki Virolainen (1977–1979)
- Mikko Volotinen (1966–1970)
- Paavo Väyrynen (1970–1995, 1999, 2007–2011, 2015)
- Marjatta Väänänen (1975–1991)
- Toivo Yläjärvi (1975–1987)
- Lasse Äikäs (1975–1983)
- Saimi Ääri (1970–1979, 1993–1995)

=== 1980s and 1990s ===
- Esko Aho (1983–2003)
- Hannu Aho (1999–2003)
- Sulo Aittoniemi (1994–1999) (defected from Alkioist Centrist group and later to Centre Party group)
- Olavi Ala-Nissilä (1991–2006, 2015–2019)
- Juhani Alaranta (1983–1999)
- Sirkka-Liisa Anttila (1983–1996, 1999–2019)
- Maria Kaisa Aula (1991–2003)
- Rose-Marie Björkenheim (1991–1999)
- Kauko Heikkinen (1987–1995)
- Jorma Huuhtanen (1987–2000)
- Liisa Hyssälä (1995–2010)
- Pirkko Ikonen (1983–1991)
- Tuula Ikonen, myöhemmin Tuula Ikonen-Graafmans (1991–1995)
- Tytti Isohookana-Asunmaa (1983–2003)
- Esko Jokiniemi (1987–1995)
- Timo Järvilahti (1991–1995, 1996–1999)
- Anneli Jäätteenmäki (1987–2004)
- Timo Kalli (1991–)
- Kyösti Karjula (1995–2011)
- Riitta Kauppinen (1987–1994) (defected to National Coalition Party group)
- Hannu Kemppainen (1983–1987, 1991–1999)
- Inkeri Kerola (1999–2015)
- Niilo Keränen (1999–2003, 2015–)
- Timo Kietäväinen (1983–1991)
- Mari Kiviniemi (1995–2014)
- Annikki Koistinen (1987–1999)
- Heikki Kokko (1983–1991)
- Armas Komi (1991–1999)
- Katri Komi (1999–2015)
- Juha Korkeaoja (1991–2011)
- Ossi Korteniemi (1994–2001)
- Timo E. Korva (1991–1995, 2001–2003)
- Markku Koski (1991–1999, 2003–2007)
- Liisa Kulhia
- Seppo Kääriäinen (1987–2019)
- Seppo Lahtela (1999–2006) (defected from National Coalition Party group)
- Jarmo Laivoranta (1991–1995)
- Markku Laukkanen (1991–1995, 1999–2011)
- Eero Lämsä (1995–2007)
- Paula Lehtomäki (1999–2015, 2017)
- Markku Lehtosaari (1987–1999)
- Jari Leppä (1999–)
- Johannes Leppänen (1991–2003)
- Raimo Liikkanen (1991–1999)
- Maija-Liisa Lindqvist (1991–1999, 2003–2007)
- Mika Lintilä (1999–)
- Hannes Manninen (1995–2011)
- Helmi Morri (1991–1995)
- Kari Myllyniemi (1995–2003)
- Tero Mölsä (1991–1995, 1995–1999, 1999–2003)
- Petri Neittaanmäki (1999–2007)
- Pekka Nousiainen (1999–2007)
- Lasse Näsi (1991–1995)
- Lauri Oinonen (1999–2011)
- Seppo Pelttari (1983–1995)
- Osmo Puhakka (1999–2003)
- Raili Puhakka (1991–1995)
- Martti Pura (1992–1995)
- Pekka Puska (1987–1991, 2017–)
- Antti Rantakangas (1999–2019)
- Aulis Ranta-Muotio (1995–2007)
- Olli Rehn (1991–1995, 2015–2017)
- Vuokko Rehn (1995–1999)
- Juha Rehula (1996–2019)
- Tellervo Renko (1986–1991, 1991–1995)
- Markku Rossi (1991–1995, 1999, 2000–)
- Matti Ryhänen (1996–1999)
- Mirja Ryynänen (1987–1995, 1999–2003)
- Kalle Röntynen (1987–1995)
- Pauli Saapunki (1987–2003)
- Tanja Karpela (1999–2011)
- Aapo Saari (1983–1999)
- Mauri Salo (1995–1996, 1999–2003, 2006–2007, 2010–2011)
- Kimmo Sarapää (1987–1991)
- Juho Sillanpää (1987–1991)
- Eino Siuruainen (1987–1991)
- Aino Suhola (1991–1999)
- Hannu Takkula (1995–2004)
- Matti Vanhanen (1991–2010, 2015–)
- Anu Vehviläinen (1995–2003, 2007–)
- Maija-Liisa Veteläinen (1995–1999)
- Jukka Vihriälä (1983–2007)
- Pekka Viljanen (1991–1995)
- Pekka Vilkuna (1999–2011)
- Kyösti Virrankoski (1991–1995)
- Markku Vuorensola (1991–1999)
- Matti Väistö (1987–2007)
- Jaana Ylä-Mononen (1999–2007)

=== 2000s and 2010s ===
- Esko Ahonen (2003–2011)
- Pekka Aittakumpu (2019–)
- Mikko Alatalo (2003–2019)
- Risto Autio (2007–2011)
- Anne Berner (2015–2019)
- Susanna Haapoja (2003–2009)
- Pertti Hakanen (2015–2019)
- Lasse Hautala (2003–2007, 2009–2019)
- Hannakaisa Heikkinen (2007–2011, 2015–)
- Petri Honkonen (2015–)
- Hannu Hoskonen (2003–2011, 2015–)
- Hanna Huttunen (2019–)
- Tuomo Hänninen (2003–2011)
- Marisanna Jarva (2015–2019)
- Antti Kaikkonen (2003–)
- Eeva Kalli (2019–)
- Anne Kalmari (2007–)
- Oiva Kaltiokumpu (2007–2011)
- Tatja Karvonen (2004–2007)
- Elsi Katainen (2007–2018)
- Timo Kaunisto (2007–2011)
- Hilkka Kemppi (2019–)
- Rauno Kettunen (2003–2007)
- Tuomas Kettunen (2019–)
- Mikko Kinnunen (2019–)
- Esko Kiviranta (2003–)
- Pasi Kivisaari (2019–)
- Timo Korhonen (2007–2019)
- Laila Koskela (2014–2015) (defected from the Finns Party's group)
- Hanna Kosonen (2015–)
- Katri Kulmuni (2015–)
- Antti Kurvinen (2015–)
- Mikko Kärnä (2015–2018, 2019–)
- Joonas Könttä (2019–)
- Eero Lankia (2003–2007)
- Markus Lohi (2011–)
- Eeva-Maria Maijala (2011–2019)
- Hanna-Leena Mattila (2018–)
- Juha Mieto (2007–2011)
- Eija Nivala (2018)
- Jouni Ovaska (2019–)
- Markku Pakkanen (2007–2011, 2015–2019)
- Aila Paloniemi (2003–2019)
- Ulla Parviainen (2015–2019)
- Terhi Peltokorpi (2004–2007, 2014–2015)
- Klaus Pentti (2003–2011)
- Arto Pirttilahti (2011–)
- Tuomo Puumala (2007–2019)
- Juha Pylväs (2015–)
- Eero Reijonen (2003–2015, 2018–2019)
- Simo Rundgren (2003–2007, 2011–2015)
- Annika Saarikko (2011–)
- Pertti Salovaara (2003–2011)
- Mikko Savola (2011–)
- Janne Seurujärvi (2007–2011)
- Paula Sihto (2007–2011)
- Juha Sipilä (2011–)
- Seppo Särkiniemi (2003–2007, 2010–2011)
- Martti Talja (2015–2019)
- Kimmo Tiilikainen (2003–2019)
- Ari Torniainen (2011–)
- Tapani Tölli (2003–2019)
- Markku Uusipaavalniemi (2007–2010) (defected from the Finns Party's group)
- Mirja Vehkaperä (2007–2018)
- Eerikki Viljanen (2015–2019)

== Alkioist Centrist Group ==
- Sulo Aittoniemi (1999–2003) (defected from Centre Party group)

== Alternative for Finland ==
- Vesa Laukkanen (1993–1995) (defected from Christian League group)

== Change 2011 ==
- James Hirvisaari (2013–2015) (formed new group; left the Finns Party's group)

== Christian Democrats / Christian League ==
- Sauli Ahvenjärvi (2011–2015)
- Esko Almgren (1979–1991)
- Sari Essayah (2003–2007, 2015–)
- Jorma Fred (1975–1983, 1987–1991)
- Sauli Hautala (1975–1983, 1987–1991)
- Leea Hiltunen (1991–1995, 1999–2003)
- Antero Juntumaa (1972–1983)
- Ulla Järvilehto (1975–1983)
- Jouko Jääskeläinen (1991–2003, 2011–2015)
- Bjarne Kallis (1991–2011)
- Toimi Kankaanniemi (1987–2011)
- Marja-Leena Kemppainen (1999–2003)
- Erkki Korhonen (1975–1979, 1979–1983)
- Kari Kärkkäinen (1999–2011)
- Pirkko Laakkonen (1991–1995)
- Antero Laukkanen (2015–)
- Vesa Laukkanen (1991–1993) (defected to Alternative for Finland group)
- Olavi Majlander (1975–1978)
- Veikko Matikkala (1975–1979)
- Eeva-Liisa Moilanen (1987–1995)
- Impi Muroma (1975–1987)
- Sari Palm (2007–2015)
- Tauno Pehkonen (1995–1999)
- Lyly Rajala (2003) (defected to National Coalition Party group)
- Leena Rauhala (1999–2015)
- Väinö Rautiainen (1979–1983)
- Olavi Ronkainen (1972–1975, 1979–1987)
- Matti Ryhänen (1995–1996) (defected to Centre Party group)
- Päivi Räsänen (1995–)
- Ismo Seivästö (1991–1995, 1999–2003)
- Sakari Smeds (1995–2003)
- Asser Stenbäck (1979–1983)
- Tarja Tallqvist (2007–2011)
- Sari Tanus (2015–)
- Veikko Turunen (1972–1975)
- Raino Westerholm (1970–1979)
- Peter Östman (2011–)

== Christian Workers' Union ==
- Kaarlo Heininen (1907–1908)
- Matti Helenius-Seppälä (1908–1909, 1911–1914, 1917, 1919–1920)
- Antti Kaarne (1908–1911)
- Juho Kekkonen (1919–1922)
- Matti Merivirta (1907–1908)
- Eelis Rantanen (1921–1922)
- Oskari Vihantola (1919)

== Citizens' Party ==
- Paavo Väyrynen (2018) (formed new group; later formed the Seven Star Movement's parliamentary group)

== Constitutional Right Party / Constitutional People's Party ==
- Ulla Bogdanoff (1986–1987) (defected from Rural Party group)
- Georg C. Ehrnrooth (1973–1979, 1983–1987) (defected from Swedish People's Party group)
- Salme Katajavuori (1973–1975) (defected from National Coalition Party group)
- Kullervo Rainio (1978–1979) (defected from National Coalition Party group)

== Democratic Alternative ==
- Matti Kautto (1986–1987) (defected from People's Democratic League group)
- Mikko Kuoppa (1986–1987) (defected from People's Democratic League group and later to Left Alliance)
- Ensio Laine (1986–1990) (defected from People's Democratic League group and later to Left Alliance)
- Marja-Liisa Löyttyjärvi (1986–1990) (defected from People's Democratic League group and later to Left Alliance)
- Irma Rosnell (1986–1987) (defected from People's Democratic League group)
- Marjatta Stenius-Kaukonen (1986–1990) (defected from People's Democratic League group and later to Left Alliance)
- Sten Söderström (1986–1987) (defected from People's Democratic League group)
- Esko-Juhani Tennilä (1986–1990) (defected from People's Democratic League group and later to Left Alliance)
- Seppo Toiviainen (1986–1987) (defected from People's Democratic League group)
- Pirkko Turpeinen (1986–1987) (defected from People's Democratic League group)

== Finnish Front ==
- Heikki Riihijärvi (1993–1995) (defected from Rural Party)

== Finnish Party ==
- Juho Aitamurto
- Eveliina Ala-Kulju (1907–1910, 1917–1918)
- Ivar Alanen (1917–1918)
- Walfrid Alhainen
- Walter Andersin (1909)
- Benjamin Anneberg
- Juho Erkki Antila
- Juhani Arajärvi (1907–1914, 1917–1918)
- Waldemar Bergroth (1917–1918)
- Vilho Cornér (1914–1917)
- Johan Richard Danielson-Kalmari (1907–1917)
- Aukusti Eronen
- Hannes Gebhard (1907–1909)
- Hedvig Gebhard (1907–1909)
- Aleksandra Gripenberg (1907–1909)
- Reinhold Grönvall (1910–1917)
- Santeri Haapanen (1909–1911)
- Kyösti Haataja
- Oskar Hainari
- Herman Hakulinen
- Onni Hallsten
- Yrjö Halonen (1908–1909, 1914–1917)
- Antti Hanninen (1911–1914)
- Emil Helkiö
- Oskari Herttua (1911–1914)
- Elli Hiidenheimo (1917–1918)
- Pentti Hiidenheimo (1914–1917)
- Aukusti Hiltula
- Valde Hirvikanta (1909–1910)
- August Hjelt
- Iisakki Hoikka (1907–1908, 1909–1910)
- Mauri Honkajuuri (1909–1914)
- August Hyöki (1917, 1918)
- Kalle Häkkinen
- Mikko Iipponen (1911–1917)
- Leander Ikonen
- Pekka Ikonen (1914–1917)
- Pekka Toivo Ikonen (1917)
- Lauri Ingman (1907–1918)
- Mikko Jaskari (1914–1917)
- Taave Junnila (1908–1914)
- Kalle Kaakko-oja (1910–1914)
- Erkki Kaila (1917–1918)
- Oswald Kairamo (1907–1914, 1917–1918)
- Kaarlo Kares (1907–1910)
- Edvard Kilpeläinen (1914–1917)
- Väinö Kivilinna (1907–1909)
- Liisi Kivioja
- Kaarle Knuutila (1907–1908, 1910–1914)
- Aleksanteri Koivisto (1907–1918)
- Emanuel Kolkki (1907–1909)
- Matti Kotila
- Tahvo Kruus
- Hilda Käkikoski
- Aleksi Käpy (1907–1909)
- Pietari Kärnä (1911–1914)
- Arthur Lagerlöf
- Oskari Laine
- Juho Lallukka
- Kaarlo Lanne (1910–1914, 1917–1918)
- Juho Lepistö
- Akseli Listo (1907–1917)
- Oskari Wilho Louhivuori
- Jaakko Loukko (1918) (defected to Agrarian League group)
- Juho Malkamäki (1909–1911)
- Wilhelmi Malmivaara (1907–1918)
- Juho Mannermaa (1911–1917)
- Kalle Myllylä
- Juho Mynttinen
- Ernst Nevanlinna (1907–1914, 1917–1918)
- Frans Hjalmar Nortamo (1910)
- Taneli Nykänen
- Väinö Nyström
- Kaarle Ojanen
- Aate Olkkonen
- Juho Kusti Paasikivi (1907–1909, 1910–1914)
- Olli Pajari
- Juho Heikki Pakkala
- Ernst Palmén (1907–1909)
- Hjalmar Paloheimo
- Oskari Peurakoski (1909–1918)
- Tuomas Pohjanpalo (1907–1909)
- Erkki Pullinen (1907–1917) (defected to People's Party group)
- Bror Hannes Päivänsalo (1977–1918)
- Erik Pöysti
- Kaarle Raade (1917)
- Sameli Rajala (1907–1910)
- Juho Rannikko (1907–1917)
- Kaarle Rantakari (1917)
- Onni Rantasalo (1917–1918)
- Frans Rapola (1970–1910)
- Akseli Rauanheimo
- Hugo Rautapää (1910–1914)
- Vilho Reima
- Heikki Repo (1907–1908, 1909–1911, 1917)
- Alfred Retulainen (1914–1918)
- Justus Ripatti (1907–1908, 1910–1912)
- Juuso Runtti (1907–1908, 1917–1918)
- Robert Ruohtula (1911–1914)
- Pekka Saarelainen (1909–1910)
- Ernst Saari (1914–1918)
- Iisakki Saha (1914–1917)
- Julius Saraste
- Aale Sariola
- Juho Seppä-Murto
- Allan Serlachius
- Wilho Sipilä
- Mikko Sipponen
- Anshelm Sjöstedt-Jussila (1911–1918)
- Mikael Soininen
- August Tanttu (1918–1918) (defected from People's Party and later to National Coalition Party group)
- Vili Taskinen
- Matti Tervaniemi (1907–1908)
- Juho Torppa (1907–1914)
- Elias Tukia (1917–1918)
- Antti Tulenheimo (1914–1917)
- Juho Tulikoura (1907–1914) (defected to Agrarian League group)
- Mauri Tuomela (1914–1917)
- Antti Tuomikoski
- Leonard Typpö (1911–1918)
- Juho Vaarala
- Iisakki Vahe
- Wäinö Valkama (1914–1917, 1917–1918)
- Tuomas Vanhala
- Iida Vemmelpuu (1907–1909)
- Artturi H. Virkkunen (1907–1909, 1910–1911, 1914–1918)
- Paavo Virkkunen (1914–1918)
- Toini Voipio
- Kalle Vuorinen (1912–1914)
- Oskari Vuorivirta
- Kalle Vänniä
- Kaarlo Warvikko (1910–1917)
- Arthur von Weissenberg (1914–1917)
- Johannes Wilskman (1907–1908, 1911–1914)
- Artur Wuorimaa (1907–1910, 1911–1914)
- Juho Ylikorpi (1907–1908)
- Iida Yrjö-Koskinen (1909–1918)
- Lauri Yrjö-Koskinen (1911–1914)
- Sakari Yrjö-Koskinen (1907–1916)
- Yrjö Yrjö-Koskinen (1907–1909, 1910–1911)

== Finns Party ==
- Sanna Antikainen (2019–)
- Juho Eerola (2011–)
- Simon Elo (2015–2017) (formed a new New Alternative group )
- Ritva "Kike" Elomaa (2011–2017, 2017–) (formed a new New Alternative group; re-joined subsequently)
- Tiina Elovaara (2015–2017) (formed a new New Alternative group )
- Teuvo Hakkarainen (2011–2019)
- Jussi Halla-aho (2011–2014, 2019–)
- Tony Halme (2003–2007)
- Lauri Heikkilä (2011–2015)
- James Hirvisaari (2011–2013) (formed a new Change2011 group )
- Reijo Hongisto (2011–2017) (formed a new New Alternative group )
- Laura Huhtasaari (2015–2019)
- Petri Huru (2019–)
- Olli Immonen (2011–)
- Ari Jalonen (2011–2017) (formed a new New Alternative group )
- Anssi Joutsenlahti (2011–2015)
- Vilhelm Junnila (2019–)
- Johanna Jurva (2011–2015)
- Kaisa Juuso (2019–)
- Arja Juvonen (2011–2017, 2017–) (formed a new Parliamentary Group Juvonen; re-joined subsequently)
- Pietari Jääskeläinen (2009–2015)
- Toimi Kankaanniemi (2015–)
- Pentti Kettunen (2011–2015)
- Kimmo Kivelä (2011–2017) (formed a new New Alternative group )
- Osmo Kokko (2011–2015)
- Ari Koponen (2019–)
- Jari Koskela (2019–)
- Laila Koskela (2011–2014) (defected to Centre Party group )
- Jouni Kotiaho (2019–)
- Kari Kulmala (2015–2017) (formed a new New Alternative group )
- Kristian Sheikki Laakso (2019–)
- Rami Lehto (2015–)
- Jari Lindström (2011–2017) (formed a new New Alternative group )
- Maria Lohela (2011–2017) (formed a new New Alternative group )
- Anne Louhelainen (2011–2017) (formed a new New Alternative group )
- Mikko Lundén (2019–)
- Pirkko Mattila (2011–2017) (formed a new New Alternative group )
- Leena Meri (2015–)
- Juha Mäenpää (2019–)
- Jani Mäkelä (2015–)
- Lea Mäkipää (2011–2017) (formed a new New Alternative group )
- Jukka Mäkynen (2019–)
- Hanna Mäntylä (2011–2017) (formed a new New Alternative group )
- Martti Mölsä (2011–2017) (formed a new New Alternative group )
- Veijo Niemi (2019–)
- Mika Niikko (2011–)
- Jussi Niinistö (2011–2017) (formed a new New Alternative group )
- Pentti Oinonen (2007–2017) (formed a new New Alternative group )
- Tom Packalén (2011–)
- Mauri Peltokangas (2019–)
- Mika Raatikainen (2014–2019)
- Sakari Puisto (2019–)
- Riikka Purra (2019–)
- Lulu Ranne (2019–)
- Mari Rantanen (2019–)
- Minna Reijonen (2019–)
- Jari Ronkainen (2015–)
- Veera Ruoho (2015–2017) (formed a new Parliamentary Group Ruoho)
- Pirkko Ruohonen-Lerner (2007–2015)
- Vesa-Matti Saarakkala (2011–2017) (formed a new New Alternative group )
- Sami Savio (2015–)
- Jenna Simula (2019–)
- Riikka Slunga-Poutsalo (2019–)
- Timo Soini (2003–2009, 2011–2017) (formed a new New Alternative group )
- Ismo Soukola (2011–2015)
- Ville Tavio (2015–)
- Sampo Terho (2015–2017) (formed a new New Alternative group )
- Maria Tolppanen (2011–2016) (defected to Social Democratic Party group )
- Reijo Tossavainen (2011–2015)
- Ano Turtiainen (2019–)
- Kaj Turunen (2011–2017) (formed a new New Alternative group )
- Kauko Tuupainen (2011–2015)
- Sebastian Tynkkynen (2019–)
- Markku Uusipaavalniemi (2010–2011) (defected from Centre Party group )
- Veikko Vallin (2019–)
- Pertti "Veltto" Virtanen (2007–2015)
- Raimo Vistbacka (1995–2011)
- Ville Vähämäki (2011–)
- Juha Väätäinen (2011–2015)
- Jussi Wihonen (2019–)

== Free Democrats ==
- Urpo Leppänen 1989–1990 (defected from Rural Party and later to Liberal People's Party group)

== Green League ==
- Touko Aalto (2015–2019)
- Outi Alanko-Kahiluoto (2007–)
- Janina Andersson (1995–2011)
- Ulla Anttila (1991–2007)
- Tuija Brax (1995–2015)
- Tarja Cronberg (2003–2007)
- Tiina Elo (2019–)
- Bella Forsgrén (2019–)
- Merikukka Forsius (1999–2008) (defected to National Coalition Party group)
- Satu Haapanen (2011–2015)
- Pekka Haavisto (1987–1995, 2007–)
- Hanna Halmeenpää (2015–2019)
- Atte Harjanne (2019–)
- Satu Hassi (1991–2004, 2015–)
- Heidi Hautala (1991–1995, 2003–2009)
- Hanna Holopainen (2019–)
- Mari Holopainen (2019–)
- Inka Hopsu (2019–)
- Saara Hyrkkö (2019–)
- Timo Juurikkala (2009–2011)
- Heli Järvinen (2007–2011, 2015–)
- Emma Kari (2015–)
- Johanna Karimäki (2007–2019)
- Jyrki Kasvi (2003–2011, 2015–2019)
- Noora Koponen (2019–)
- Irina Krohn (1995–2006)
- Ville Komsi (1983–1987)
- Kalle Könkkölä (1983–1987)
- Hannele Luukkainen (1991–1995)
- Rosa Meriläinen (2003–2007)
- Rauha-Maria Mertjärvi (1998–2007)
- Krista Mikkonen (2015–)
- Ville Niinistö (2007–2019)
- Paavo Nikula (1991–1998)
- Maria Ohisalo (2019–)
- Kirsi Ojansuu (1999–2011)
- Eero Paloheimo (1987–1995)
- Olli-Poika Parviainen (2015–2019)
- Pirkka-Pekka Petelius (2019–)
- Jenni Pitko (2019–)
- Tuija Maaret Pykäläinen (1991–1999)
- Erkki Pulliainen (1987–2011)
- Pekka Räty (1991–1995)
- Anni Sinnemäki (1999–2015)
- Mirka Soinikoski (2019–)
- Osmo Soininvaara (1987–1991, 1995–2007, 2011–2015)
- Johanna Sumuvuori (2006–2011, 2015)
- Iiris Suomela (2019–)
- Jani Toivola (2011–2019)
- Oras Tynkkynen (2004–2015)
- Antero Vartia (2015–2019)
- Sofia Virta (2019–)
- Ozan Yanar (2015–2019)

== Group Erlund ==
- Rainer Erlund (1999–2000) (defected from Swedish People's Party group)

== Hannu Suhonen Parliamentary group ==
- Hannu Suhonen (1994–1995) (formed new group; left the Rural Party group)

== Independent or Non-partisans ==
- Tina Mäkelä (1994–1995) (defected from Rural Party group)

== Left Alliance ==
- Li Andersson (2015–)
- Paavo Arhinmäki (2007–)
- Raila Aho (1990–1995) (defected from People's Democratic League group)
- Claes Andersson (1990–1999, 2007–2008) (defected from People's Democratic League group)
- Asko Apukka (1990–1998) (defected from People's Democratic League group)
- Heli Astala (1990–1995) (defected from People's Democratic League group)
- Esko Helle (1990–2003) (defected from People's Democratic League group)
- Veronika Honkasalo (2019–)
- Anne Huotari (1995–2007)
- Terttu Huttu-Juntunen (1995–1999)
- Matti Huutola (1998–2003)
- Katja Hänninen (2014–)
- Mikko Immonen (1995–2007)
- Anna-Liisa Jokinen (1990–1991) (defected from People's Democratic League group)
- Risto Kalliorinne (2011–2015, 2019)
- Matti Kangas (1999–2011)
- Matti Kauppila (2003–2011)
- Juho Kautto (2019–)
- Arvo Kemppainen (1990–1991) (defected from People's Democratic League group)
- Mai Kivelä (2019–)
- Anna Kontula (2011–)
- Martti Korhonen (1991–2015)
- Mikko Kuoppa (1995–1995, 1999–2011) (left the Leftist Group)
- Merja Kyllönen (2007–2014, 2019–)
- Jaakko Laakso (1991–2011)
- Timo Laaksonen (1990–1999) (defected from People's Democratic League group)
- Pertti Lahtinen (1990–1991) (defected from People's Democratic League group)
- Reino Laine (1996–1999)
- Annika Lapintie (1995–2019)
- Pekka Leppänen (1990–1999) (defected from People's Democratic League group)
- Ensio Laine (1990–1995) (left the Democratic Alternative to Left Alliance )
- Pia Lohikoski (2019–)
- Marja-Liisa Löyttyjärvi (1990–1991) (left the Democratic Alternative to Left Alliance )
- Silvia Modig (2011–2019)
- Markus Mustajärvi (2003–2011, 2015–)(left the Left Group)
- Jari Myllykoski (2011–)
- Lauha Männistö (1990–1991) (defected from People's Democratic League group)
- Outi Ojala (1991–1996, 1999–2007)
- Aino-Kaisa Pekonen (2011–)
- Iivo Polvi (1991–2007)
- Osmo Polvinen (1991–1995)
- Veijo Puhjo (1995–1995, 1999–2011) (left the Leftist Group to Parliamentary Group Puhjo and later to Leftist Group)
- Eila Rimmi (1991–1999)
- Pekka Saarnio (1996–1999)
- Jussi Saramo (2019–)
- Hanna Sarkkinen (2015–)
- Matti Semi (2015–)
- Esko Seppänen (1990–1996) (defected from People's Democratic League group)
- Suvi-Anne Siimes (1999–2007)
- Minna Sirnö (2003–2011)
- Marjatta Stenius-Kaukonen (1990–1995, 1999–2003) (left the Democratic Alternative to Left Alliance )
- Katja Syvärinen (1999–2007)
- Vappu Säilynoja (1990–1991) (defected from People's Democratic League group)
- Esko-Juhani Tennilä (1990–1995, 1999–2011) (left the Democratic Alternative to Left Alliance and later to Leftist Group)
- Eila Tiainen (2011–2015)
- Pentti Tiusanen (1995–2011)
- Pertti Turtiainen (1999–2003)
- Pauli Uitto (1990–1991) (defected from People's Democratic League group)
- Kari Uotila (1995–2007, 2008–2019)
- Unto Valpas (1999–2011)
- Erkki Virtanen (2003–2015)
- Jorma Vokkolainen (1995–2001)
- Juhani Vähäkangas (1990–1995) (defected from People's Democratic League group)
- Jarmo Wahlström (1990–1999) (defected from People's Democratic League group)
- Johannes Yrttiaho (2019–)
- Jyrki Yrttiaho (2007–2011) (left the Left Alliance to Left Group )

== Left group ==
- Markus Mustajärvi (2011–2015) (formed new group; left the Left Alliance)
- Jyrki Yrttiaho (2011–2015) (formed new group; left the Left Alliance)

== Leftist Group ==
- Mikko Kuoppa (1995–1999 ) (formed new group; left the Left Alliance)
- Veijo Puhjo (1996–1999) (formed new group; left the Left Alliance)
- Esko-Juhani Tennilä (1995–1999) (formed new group; left the Left Alliance)

== Liberal People's Party / Liberals ==
- Pirkko Aro (1966–1973)
- Arne Berner (1966–1972)
- Olavi Borg (1972–1975)
- Kerttu Hemmi (1970–1979)
- Armi Hosia (1965–1966)
- Helvi Hyrynkangas (1979–1983)
- Veikko Hyytiäinen (1965–1966)
- Jaakko Itälä (1979–1983)
- Mikko Juva (1965–1966)
- Esa Kaitila (1965–1966)
- Seppo Kanerva (2002–2003)
- Irma Karvikko (1965–1970)
- Anneli Kivitie, later became Kivitie-Koskinen (1975–1983)
- Aili Laitinen (1972–1975)
- Eeles Landström (1966–1972)
- Armas Leinonen (1965–1970)
- Urpo Leppänen (1990–1991) (defected to Free Democrats group)
- Antti Linna (1965–1966)
- Leo Mattila (1965–1966)
- Terhi Nieminen, later became Nieminen-Mäkynen (1975–1983)
- Eino Ojajärvi (1962–1966)
- Juhani Orrenmaa (1975–1979)
- E.J. Paavola (1965–1970)
- Pentti Pakarinen (1962–1966)
- Pekka Pesola (1966–1972)
- Tuure Salo (1965–1970)
- Juhani Sipiläinen (1975–1979)
- Aaro Stykki (1965–1966)
- Pekka Tarjanne (1970–1977)
- Juho Tenhiälä (1965–1966)
- Irma Toivanen (1970–1979)
- Tuulikki Ukkola (1991–1995)
- Seppo Westerlund (1970–1979)
- Osmo Wiio (1975–1979)

== Liberal Swedish Party ==
- Georg Schauman (1919–1930)
- Max Sergelius (1926–1939, 1945–1948)
- Georg von Wendt (1919–1922)

== Liike Nyt ==
- Harry "Hjallis" Harkimo (2018–) (formed new group; left the National Coalition Party)
- Maria Lohela (2019) (left the Blue Reform)

== Member of Parliament Väyrynen ==
- Paavo Väyrynen (2018) (formed new group; left the Centre Party; later formed the Citizens' Party's parliamentary group)

== National Coalition Party ==
1900s and 1910s

- Pekka Ahmavaara (1918–1919)
- Eveliina Ala-Kulju (1918–1919)
- Ivar Alanen (1918–1919)
- Juho Erkki Antila
- Juhani Arajärvi (1919–1922)
- Gustaf Arokallio (1918–1919)
- Waldemar Bergroth (1918–1919, 1922–1927)
- Mikko Erich (1919–1922)
- Rafael Erich (1919–1924)
- Hedvig Gebhard (1919–1922, 1924–1929)
- Kyösti Haataja (1918–1919, 1929–1930)
- Ilmi Hallsten (1919–1922)
- Edvard Hannula (1919–1922)
- Artturi Hiidenheimo (1919–1927)
- Elli Hiidenheimo (1918–1922, 1924–1927)
- Kaarlo Holma (1919–1922)
- Theodor Homén (1919–1922)
- Tekla Hultin (1918–1924)
- August Hyöki (1918–1919)
- Kalle Häkkinen
- Janne Ihamuotila (1919–1922)
- Lauri Ingman (1918–1919, 1922–1929)
- Mikko Jaskari (1920–1927)
- Taave Junnila (1922–1936)
- Väinö Juustila (1918–1922)
- Erkki Kaila (1918–1922)
- Oswald Kairamo (1918–1919)
- Kaarlo Kares (1922–1927) (defected to Patriotic People's Movement group)
- Edvard Kilpeläinen (1922–1927, 1929–1933, 1936–1939)
- Aleksanteri Koivisto (1918–1921)
- Emanuel Kolkki (1930–1933)
- Matti Kotila
- Arthur Lagerlöf (1918–1919)
- Kaarlo Lanne (1918–1922)
- Elli Laurila (1919–1919)
- Wilho Louhivuori
- Wilhelmi Malmivaara (1918–1920)
- Juho Mannermaa (1922–1927)
- Matti Mannonen (1919–1922)
- Jalmari Meurman (1919–1919)
- Ernst Nevanlinna (1918–1922)
- Ville Nikkanen (1919–1933)
- Oskar Nissinen
- Aapo Nuora (1922–1924)
- Johannes Nyberg (1919–1924)
- Pekka Paavolainen (1918–1919)
- Pekka Pennanen (1922–1945)
- Matti Pesonen (1922–1924)
- Oskari Peurakoski
- Bror Hannes Päivänsalo (1918–1919, 1929–1933)
- Juho Rannikko (1922–1927)
- Onni Rantasalo (1918–1919)
- Heikki Renvall (1922–1924)
- Heikki Repo (1918–1919)
- Alfred Retulainen (1918–1919)
- Juuso Runtti (1918–1919)
- Emil Nestor Setälä (1918–1927)
- Anshelm Sjöstedt-Jussila (1918–1919, 1924–1925)
- Juho Snellman (1918–1922)
- Hugo Suolahti (1919–1922)
- Pehr Evind Svinhufvud (1930–1931)
- Onni Talas (1918–1919, 1927–1930)
- August Tanttu (1918–1919, 1922–1924) (defected from Finnish Party group)
- Elias Tukia (1918–1919)
- Antti Tulenheimo (1922–1924, 1930–1933)
- Leonard Typpö (1918–1922)
- Wäinö Valkama
- Tuomas Vanhala (1918–1919, 1922–1927)
- Artturi H. Virkkunen (1918–1922)
- Paavo Virkkunen (1918–1936, 1939–1945)
- Iida Yrjö-Koskinen (1918–1919)

1920s

- Toivo Aalto-Setälä (1927–1929, 1930–1933)
- Ernesti Aarnio (1927–1929)
- Arvi Ahmavaara (1929–1930, 1945–1954)
- Sakari Ainali (1924–1929, 1930–1933)
- Alex Alfthan
- Albert Eerola (1924–1927, 1939–1945)
- Leo Gummerus (1927–1929)
- Oskari Heikinheimo (1922–1927, 1941–1945)
- Bernhard Heikkilä (1924–1930)
- Maija Häkkinen (1929–1933)
- Frans Härmä (1922–1929)
- Jaakko Ikola (1927–1930, 1939–1945)
- Oskari Jussila (1922–1929, 1930–1933)
- Kyösti Järvinen (1922–1930)
- Juho Kinnunen
- Väinö Kivi (1929–1930)
- Erkki Kuokkanen (1927–1933)
- Wiljo-Kustaa Kuuliala (1927–1933)
- Kustaa Kylänpää (1922–1924, 1925–1929, 1936–1945)
- Antero Lamminen (1929–1933)
- Emil Lehtinen (1927–1929)
- Oskari Lehtonen (1927–1929, 1930–1933, 1936–1945, 1948–1954, 1958–1962)
- Aukusti Luoma (1927–1930)
- Aina Lähteenoja (1929–1930)
- Väinö Malmivaara (1927–1933)
- Kaapro Moilanen (1927–1945)
- Aukusti Neitiniemi (1924–1929)
- Evert Nukari (1924–1930)
- Kaino Oksanen (1927–1939)
- Erkki Paavolainen (1924–1927, 1929–1933, 1936–1951)
- Väinö Pastell (1927–1929)
- Johannes Peltonen (1922–1927)
- Lauri Pohjala (1924–1927)
- Hermanni Pojanluoma (1922–1927, 1930–1933)
- Yrjö Puhakka (1927–1928, 1929–1930)
- Yrjö Pulkkinen (1922–1929)
- Martti Rantanen (1927–1929, 1930–1935)
- Siviä Ruotzi (1924–1927)
- Armas Saastamoinen (1924–1926)
- Gunnar Sahlstein (1927–1933)
- Jooseppi Seppänen
- Veli Kustaa Simelius (1922–1924)
- Eva Somersalo (1924–1927)
- Eino Tulenheimo (1922–1927)
- Samuli Tuomikoski (1929–1933)
- Ernsti Aleksanteri Turja (1924–1933, 1939–1951)
- Antti Vainio (1928–1929)
- Jalmari Viljanen
- Olli Pekka Zitting (1926–1927)

1930s and 1940s

- Reino Ala-Kulju (1952–1954, 1959–1966)
- Heikki Ala-Mäyry (1948–1951)
- Yrjö Antila (1945–1951)
- Kaarlo Anttila (1930–1933)
- Margit Borg-Sundman (1948–1954, 1958–1970)
- Leo Böök (1933–1939)
- Antti Hackzell (1939–1945)
- Jaakko Hakala (1945–1956)
- Irma Hamara (1948–1958, 1966–1970)
- Eemeli Harja (1936–1939)
- Väinö Havas (1939–1941)
- Matti Heikkilä (1939–1954)
- Juho Heitto (1948–1954)
- Päiviö Hetemäki (1945–1962)
- Yrjö Hirvensalo (1938–1939)
- Aarne Honka (1933–1939, 1948–1951)
- Niilo Honkala (1945–1958)
- Toivo Horelli (1933–1945)
- Kaarlo Huhtala (1930–1933)
- Mikko Hurtta (1939–1945)
- Rakel Jalas (1948–19512)
- Lauri Järvi (1945–1948, 1954–1958)
- Kaiku Kallio (1939–1945)
- Alli Kallioniemi (1930–1933)
- Kosti Kankainen (1945–1948)
- Lauri Kaukamaa (1948–1951)
- Eero Kivelä (1945–1948)
- Erkki Koivisto (1945–1966)
- Väinö Kokko (1936–1943)
- Paavo Korpisaari (1930–1933)
- Aku Korvenoja (1933–1936, 1939–1945)
- Yrjö Koskelainen (1931–1933)
- Aleksanteri Koskenheimo (1930–1933)
- Usko Koski (1948–1951)
- Martti O. Kölli (1945–1954)
- Jussi Lappi-Seppälä (1945–1954)
- Kustaa Lehtonen (1933–1936, 1943–1954)
- Erkki Leikola (1945–1951, 1954–1962)
- Yrjö Leiwo (1930–1936)
- Leo Leppä (1945–1948)
- Edwin Linkomies (1933–1945)
- Arvo Lintulahti (1936–1939)
- Tatu Malmivaara (1945–1948)
- Lauri Mäkelä (1930–1933)
- Eero Mäkinen (1945–1951)
- Iisakki Nikkola (1951–1952)
- Hugo Nuorsaari (1948–1954)
- Arvi Oksala (1930–1949)
- Erkki Perheentupa (1930–1933)
- Emil Pesonen (1930–1933)
- Martti Pihkala (1930–1933)
- Jalmari Pilkama (1930–1933)
- Kyllikki Pohjala (1933–1962)
- Arvo Pohjannoro (1936–1948)
- Jalmari Pusa
- Emil Rautaharju
- Hilja Riipinen (1930–1933) (defected to Patriotic People's Movement group)
- Urho Saariaho (1945–1966)
- Arvo Salminen (1941–1948, 1954–1958)
- Jussi Saukkonen (1949–1951, 1958–1966)
- Felix Seppälä (1945–1958)
- Kalle Soini (1933–1945)
- Niilo Solja (1930–1933)
- Kaarlo Sovijärvi (1930–1933)
- Oiva Turunen (1948–1951, 1962–1966)
- Arno Tuurna (1939–1958)
- Eetu Vaarama (1933–1938)
- Teuvo Valanne (1942–1948)
- Helena Virkki (1945–1954)
- Toivo Wiherheimo (1948–1966)
- Johannes Wirtanen (1945–1959)
- Matti Ytti (1945–1948)

1950s and 1960s

- Aksel Airo (1958–1966)
- Jouni Apajalahti (1966–1970)
- Mikko Asunta (1958–1970, 1972–1979)
- Olli Aulanko (1958–1964)
- Saara Forsius (1954–1970)
- Pekka Haarla (1966–1972)
- Raino Hallberg (1951–1966)
- Erkki Hara (1958–1972)
- Toivo Hietala (1958–1970)
- Sakari Huima (1966–1970)
- Martti Huttunen (1951–1956)
- Erkki Huurtamo (1962–1975)
- Juuso Häikiö (1962–1983)
- Raimo Ilaskivi (1962–1975)
- Aune Innala (1951–1962)
- Tuure Junnila (1951–1962, 1966–1979, 1983–1987, 1990–1991)
- Jaakko Kemppainen (1958–1970)
- Esko Koppanen (1962–1983)
- Niilo Kosola (1951–1970)
- Väinö Kuoppala (1962–1963)
- Anna-Liisa Linkola (1962–1979)
- Olavi Lähteenmäki (1958–1975)
- Pentti Mäki-Hakola (1966–1995)
- Timo Mäki (1964–1979)
- Väinö Nieminen (1958–1966)
- Olavi Nikkilä (1966–1975, 1979–1983)
- Matti Raipala (1954–1970)
- Paavo Rautkallio (1962–1966)
- Juha Rihtniemi (1958–1971)
- Tuomas Saikku (1956–1958)
- Martti Salminen (1956–1962)
- Kalervo Saura (1951–1966)
- Mauri Seppä (1954–1962, 1970–1975)
- Aapo Seppälä (1962–1966)
- Pentti Sillantaus (1962–1972, 1975–1983)
- Erkki Tuuli (1954–1966)
- Alli Vaittinen-Kuikka (1966–1979)
- Martti Valkama (1963–1966)
- Tauno Vartia (1966–1975)

1970s and 1980s

- Sampsa Aaltio (1979–1987)
- Anna-Kaarina Aalto (1971–1972)
- Aslak Aas (1970–1972)
- Kirsti Ala-Harja (1987–1999)
- Pirjo-Riitta Antvuori (1987–1995, 1996–2003)
- Kaarina Dromberg (1983–2007)
- Matti Hakala (1979–1983)
- Maija Heino-Vesihiisi (1970–1972)
- Elsi Hetemäki-Olander (1970–1991)
- Liisa Hilpelä (1983–1991)
- Matti Hokkanen (1972–1983, 1987–1991)
- Harri Holkeri (1970–1979)
- Kirsti Hollming (1975–1978)
- Tapio Holvitie (1979–1991)
- Erkki Häkämies (1970–1979)
- Kari Häkämies (1987–1998)
- Timo Ihamäki (1979–1983, 1993–2003)
- Olli Ikkala (1987–1991)
- Lauri Impiö (1974–1987)
- Matti Jaatinen (1970–1984)
- Heikki Jartti (1975–1979)
- Aila Jokinen (1979–1983)
- Pekka Jokinen (1972–1983)
- Riitta Jouppila (1983–1995)
- Vuokko Juhola (1978–1979)
- Heikki Järvenpää (1979–1991, 1998–1999)
- Keijo Jääskeläinen (1987–1991)
- Ilkka Kanerva (1975–)
- Salme Katajavuori (1970–1973) (defected to Constitutional People's Party group)
- Eeva Kauppi (1970–1983)
- Orvokki Kauppila (1970–1972)
- Riitta Kauppinen (1994–1995) (defected from Centre Party group)
- Maunu Kohijoki (1987–1995)
- Juho Koivisto (1983–1987)
- Martti Korkia-Aho (1987–1991)
- Eeva Kuuskoski (1979–1980) (defected from Centre Party group)
- Lea Kärhä (1983–1991)
- Gunnar Laatio (1970–1975)
- Matti Lahtinen (1984–1995)
- Juhani Laitinen (1979–1983, 1987–1991)
- Kalevi Lamminen (1987–1999, 2003–2007)
- Arto Lampinen (1974–1983)
- Sirkka Lankinen (1970–1975)
- Eero Lattula (1972–1983)
- Ritva Laurila (1978–1995)
- Sinikka Linkomies-Pohjala (1970–1983)
- Tuula Linnainmaa (1987–1997)
- Anna-Kaarina Louvo (1989–1995)
- Pekka Löyttyniemi (1979–1985)
- Mauri Miettinen (1972–1993)
- Saara Mikkola (1975–1987)
- Erkki Moisander (1983–1987)
- Jouni Mykkänen (1970–1975)
- Toivo Mäkynen (1979–1983)
- Tapani Mörttinen (1975–1983, 1987–1991)
- Sauli Niinistö (1987–2003, 2007–2011)
- Heikki A. Ollila (1987–1995, 2003–2011)
- Matti Pelttari (1978–1983)
- Heikki Perho (1975–1991)
- Helena Pesola (1979–1991)
- Tuulikki Petäjäniemi (1979–1987)
- Sirpa Pietikäinen (1983–2003)
- Toivo T. Pohjala (1975–1987)
- Aino Pohjanoksa (1983–1991)
- Eva Pukkio (1979–1983)
- Ulla Puolanne (1975–1991)
- Erkki Pystynen (1975–1991)
- Kullervo Rainio (1972–1978) (defected to Constitutional People's Party group)
- Anssi Rauramo (1987–1998)
- Irma Rihtniemi-Koski (1975–1981)
- Pirjo Rusanen (1983–1995)
- Helge Saarikoski (1979–1987)
- Riitta Saastamoinen (1987–1995)
- Antero Salmenkivi (1970–1979)
- Pertti Salolainen (1970–1996, 2007–2019)
- Markku Salonen (1975–1977)
- Kimmo Sasi (1983–2015)
- Oiva Savela (1987–1999)
- Eva-Riitta Siitonen (1983–1989)
- Ilkka Suominen (1970–1975, 1983–1994)
- Sami Suominen (1970–1975)
- Jouni J. Särkijärvi (1987–2003)
- Eeva Särkkä (1970–1972)
- Anneli Taina (1987–1999)
- Niilo Tarvajärvi (1970–1972)
- Martti Tiuri (1983–2003)
- Jalmari Torikka (1977–1983)
- Eeva Turunen (1983–1995)
- Riitta Uosukainen (1983–2003)
- Martti Ursin (1979–1983)
- Sakari Valli (1983–1991)
- Tauno Valo (1979–1991)
- Päivi Varpasuo (1985–1999)
- Ritva Vastamäki (1987–1991)
- Iiro Viinanen (1983–1996)
- Juha Vikatmaa (1970–1974)
- Matti Viljanen (1979–1991)
- Mauri Vänskä (1979–1983)
- Ben Zyskowicz (1979–)

1990s and 2000s

- Eero Akaan-Penttilä (1999–2011)
- Sirpa Asko-Seljavaara (2003–2011)
- Matti Aura (1995–1999)
- Merikukka Forsius (2008–2011) (defected from Green League group)
- Juha Hakola (2007–2011)
- Leena Harkimo (1999–2015)
- Olli-Pekka Heinonen (1995–2002)
- Timo Heinonen (2007–)
- Pertti Hemmilä (1999–2015)
- Hanna-Leena Hemming (2003–2011)
- Anne Holmlund (2002–2015)
- Jyri Häkämies (1999–2012)
- Ville Itälä (1995–2004)
- Harri Jaskari (2007–2019)
- Kalle Jokinen (2009–)
- Marjut Kaarilahti (1991–1999)
- Seppo Kanerva (1996–2002)
- Kari Kantalainen (1995–2003)
- Minna Karhunen (1991–1999)
- Arja Karhuvaara (2007–2011)
- Juha Karpio (1995–2003)
- Marjukka Karttunen (1999–2007)
- Ulla Karvo (2007–2011)
- Jyrki Katainen (1999–2014)
- Sampsa Kataja (2007–2015)
- Pekka Kivelä (1993–1995)
- Anne Knaapi (1995–1999)
- Paula Kokkonen (1995–2003)
- Riitta Korhonen (1995–2003)
- Heikki Koskinen (1995–1999)
- Jari Koskinen (1996–2009)
- Kalervo Kummola (1995–2003)
- Pekka Kuosmanen (1999–2007)
- Osmo Kurola (1995–1999)
- Esko Kurvinen (1999–2007, 2011–2015)
- Seppo Lahtela (2006–2007) (defected from Centre Party group)
- Jere Lahti (2003–2007)
- Jari Larikka (2007–2011)
- Sanna Lauslahti (2007–2018)
- Jouko Laxell (2004–2011)
- Eero Lehti (2007–2019)
- Jouni Lehtimäki (1999–2003)
- Leila Lehtinen (1991–1995)
- Sirkka Lekman (1998–1999)
- Suvi Lindén (1995–2011)
- Hanna Markkula-Kivisilta (1991–2003)
- Markku Markkula (1995–2003)
- Marjo Matikainen-Kallström (2003–2015)
- Pertti Mäki-Hakola (1999–2003)
- Tapani Mäkinen (2003–2004, 2007–2015)
- Jukka Mäkelä (2007–2010)
- Outi Mäkelä (2007–2018)
- Olli Nepponen (1999–2011)
- Tuija Nurmi (1995–2011)
- Petteri Orpo (2007–)
- Reijo Paajanen (2003–2011)
- Maija Perho (1991–2007)
- Sanna Perkiö (2007–2011)
- Kirsi Piha (1994–1996, 1999–2003)
- Petri Pihlajaniemi (2007–2011)
- Lyly Rajala (2003–2011) (defected from Christian Democratic Party group)
- Pekka Ravi (1999–2003, 2007–2015)
- Paula Risikko (2003–)
- Martin Saarikangas (2003–2007)
- Väinö Saario (1991–1996)
- Petri Salo (1999–2011)
- Sari Sarkomaa (1999–)
- Arto Satonen (2003–)
- Timo Seppälä (1999–2007)
- Outi Siimes (1996–1999)
- Juhani Sjöblom (1999–2007)
- Irmeli Takala (1991–1995)
- Marja Tiura (1999–2011)
- Lenita Toivakka (2007–2019)
- Kyösti Toivonen (1991–1995)
- Irja Tulonen (1995–2007)
- Tuulikki Ukkola (2007–2011)
- Raija Vahasalo (1999–2015, 2018–2019)
- Jan Vapaavuori (2003–2015)
- Ahti Vielma (2003–2007)
- Jari Vilén (1999–2007)
- Ilkka Viljanen (2007–2011)
- Lasse Virén (1999–2007, 2010–2011)
- Henna Virkkunen (2007–2014)
- Anne-Mari Virolainen (2007–)

2010s

- Heikki Autto (2011–2015, 2019–)
- Markku Eestilä (2011–)
- Sanni Grahn-Laasonen (2011–)
- Harry "Hjallis" Harkimo (2015–2018) (later formed the Liike Nyt's parliamentary group)
- Janne Heikkinen (2019–)
- Antti Häkkänen (2015–)
- Anna-Kaisa Ikonen (2019–)
- Pia Kauma (2011–2015, 2017–)
- Ville Kaunisto (2019–)
- Pihla Keto-Huovinen (2019–)
- Jukka Kopra (2011–)
- Susanna Koski (2015–2019)
- Marko Kilpi (2019–)
- Pauli Kiuru (2011–)
- Terhi Koulumies (2019–)
- Mia Laiho (2018–)
- Jaana Laitinen-Pesola (2015–2019)
- Elina Lepomäki (2014–)
- Matias Marttinen (2019–)
- Sari Multala (2015–)
- Kai Mykkänen (2015–)
- Lasse Männistö (2011–2015)
- Markku Mäntymaa (2011–2015)
- Mikael Palola (2014–2015)
- Jaana Pelkonen (2011–)
- Sari Raassina (2015–2019)
- Veera Ruoho (2017–2019)
- Wille Rydman (2015–)
- Janne Sankelo (2011–2015, 2019–)
- Saara-Sofia Sirén (2015–)
- Ruut Sjöblom (2019–)
- Alexander Stubb (2011–2017)
- Eero Suutari (2011–2019)
- Mari-Leena Talvitie (2015–)
- Kari Tolvanen (2011–)
- Kaj Turunen (2018–2019) (defected from the Blue Reform)
- Anu Urpalainen (2012–2015)
- Juhana Vartiainen (2015–)
- Heikki Vestman (2019–)
- Sofia Vikman (2011–)
- Sinuhe Wallinheimo (2011–)

== National Progressive Party ==
- Arthur Aspelin (1922–1924)
- Juho Astala (1918–1919) (defected from Young Finnish Party group)
- Ilmari Auer (1919–1922, 1924–1927)
- Rolf Berner (1945–1951)
- Helena Brander (1918–1919) (defected from Young Finnish Party group)
- Uuno Brander (1924–1927, 1930–1933) (defected from Young Finnish Party group)
- Aimo Cajander (1929–1943)
- Mikko Collan (1919–1920)
- Eljas Erkko (1933–1936)
- Aleksanteri Fränti (1919–1922, 1934–1936) (defected from Young Finnish Party group)
- Mandi Hannula (1919–1930, 1936–1945)
- Eva Heikinheimo (1925–1927)
- Taavetti Heimonen (1918–1920) (defected from People's Party group)
- Sulo Heiniö (1933–1936, 1939–1948)
- Lassi Hiekkala (1945–1951)
- Gabriel Hirvensalo (1922–1924) (defected from Young Finnish Party group)
- Vilho Hirvensalo (1924–1927)
- Rudolf Holsti (1922) (defected from Young Finnish Party group)
- August Hämäläinen (1919–1922)
- Pekka Toivo Ikonen (1922–1924) (defected from Young Finnish Party group)
- Arvo Inkilä (1933–1938)
- Aaro Jaskari (1922–1925)
- Emil Jatkola (1930–1933)
- Jalmari Jyske (1919–1921, 1924–1927, 1930–1933)
- Teuvo Kaitila (1918–1919) (defected from Young Finnish Party group)
- Heikki Kannisto (1933–1936, 1945–1954 (defected from Finnish People's Party group)
- Heikki Karjalainen (1927–1929)
- Irma Karvikko (1948–1951) (defected from Finnish People's Party group)
- Juho Kaskinen (1919–1922, 1930–1932) (defected from Young Finnish Party group)
- Kalle Kauppi (1943–1951)
- Matti Kekki (1919–1922) (defected from Young Finnish Party group)
- Arvo Ketonen (1939–1945)
- Kaaperi Kivialho (1923–1924)
- Toivo Kivimäki (1922, 1924–1927, 1929–1940)
- Rope Kojonen (1919–1922)
- Arvi Kontu (1919–1922)
- Ensio Kytömaa (1945–1948)
- Augusta Laine (1918–1919, 1922) (defected from Young Finnish Party group)
- Eemil Linna (1918–1930) (defected from Young Finnish Party group)
- Hugo Linna (1918–1919) (defected from Young Finnish Party group)
- Johannes Lundson (1918–1919) (defected from Young Finnish Party group)
- Alpo Luostarinen (1922–1927)
- Oskari Mantere (1919–1939)
- Väinö Merivirta (1935–1936)
- Herman Niittynen (1919)
- Akseli Nikula (1940–1945) (defected from Young Finnish Party group)
- Tatu Nissinen (1920–1922)
- Hulda Nordenstreng (1929–1930)
- Antti Penttilä (1922–1924)
- Otto Pesonen (1919) (defected from Young Finnish Party group)
- Albin Pulkkinen (1922–1924)
- Erkki Pullinen (1918–1919, 1922–1927) (defected from People's Party group)
- Heikki Ritavuori (1919–1922) (defected from Young Finnish Party group)
- Kustaa Ruuskanen (1919–1922)
- Eero Rydman (1927–1929, 1933–1936)
- Risto Ryti (1919–1929)
- Bruno Sarlin (1919–1920, 1930–1936, 1945–1948)
- Aarne Sihvo (1919–1920)
- Elias Sinkko (1918–1922, 1927–1929)
- Mikael Soininen (1919–1922)
- Kaarlo Juho Ståhlberg (1918, 1930–1933)
- Yrjö Suontausta (1945–1947)
- Helena Syrjälä-Eskola (1936–1939, 1940–1945)
- Wille Särkkä (1918–1929, 1930–1936)
- Vili Taskinen (1919, 1920–1922)
- Sulo Teittinen (1939–1948)
- Paul Thuneberg (1918–1919)
- Juhana Toiviainen (1918–1919)
- Urho Toivola (1933–1936)
- Juho Torppa (1919–1922)
- Walto Tuomioja (1924–1929, 1930–1931)
- Toivo Tyrni (1933–1935, 1947–1948)
- Hannes Valkama (1924–1927)
- Matti Valkonen (1919–1922)
- Eemil Vekara (1918–1919)
- Juho Vennola (1919–1930)
- V.M.J. Viljanen (1924–1927)
- Hilja Vilkemaa (1920–1922)
- Kaarlo Vuokoski (1918–1922, 1924–1927) (defected from People's Party group)

== New Alternative / Blue Reform ==
- Simon Elo (2017–2019) (formed new group; left the Finns Party)
- Ritva "Kike" Elomaa (2017) (formed new group; left the Finns Party; re-joined the Finns Party subsequently)
- Tiina Elovaara (2017–2019) (formed new group; left the Finns Party)
- Reijo Hongisto (2017–2019) (formed new group; left the Finns Party)
- Ari Jalonen (2017–2019) (formed new group; left the Finns Party)
- Kimmo Kivelä (2017–2019) (formed new group; left the Finns Party)
- Kari Kulmala (2017–2019) (formed new group; left the Finns Party)
- Jari Lindström (2017–2019) (formed new group; left the Finns Party)
- Maria Lohela (2017–2019) (formed new group; left the Finns Party; later defected to Liike Nyt)
- Anne Louhelainen (2017–2019) (formed new group; left the Finns Party)
- Pirkko Mattila (2017–2019) (formed new group; left the Finns Party)
- Lea Mäkipää (2017–2019) (formed new group; left the Finns Party)
- Hanna Mäntylä (2017) (formed new group; left the Finns Party)
- Martti Mölsä (2017–2019) (formed new group; left the Finns Party)
- Jussi Niinistö (2017–2019) (formed new group; left the Finns Party)
- Pentti Oinonen (2017–2019) (formed new group; left the Finns Party)
- Vesa-Matti Saarakkala (2017–2019) (formed new group; left the Finns Party)
- Timo Soini (2017–2019) (formed new group; left the Finns Party)
- Sampo Terho (2017–2019) (formed new group; left the Finns Party)
- Matti Torvinen (2017–2019)
- Kaj Turunen (2017–2018) (formed new group; left the Finns Party; later defected to the National Coalition Party)

== Parliamentary Group Juvonen ==
- Arja Juvonen (2017) (formed new group; left the Finns Party; re-joined the Finns Party subsequently)

== Parliamentary Group Puhjo ==
- Veijo Puhjo (1995–1996) (formed new group; left the Left Alliance group)

== Parliamentary Group Ruoho ==
- Veera Ruoho (2017) (formed new group; left the Finns Party; joined the National Coalition Party)

== Parliamentary Group Virtanen ==
- Pertti "Veltto" Virtanen (1995–1999)

== Patriotic People's Movement ==
- Reino Ala-Kulju (1932–1939)
- Vilho Annala (1933–1945)
- Reino Cederberg (1942–1945)
- Sakari Honkala (1933–1936)
- Kustaa Jussila (1936–1939)
- Rauno Kallia (1939–1945)
- K. R. Kares (1933–1942) (defected from National Coalition Party group)
- Yrjö Kivenoja (1933–1936)
- Arvi Malmivaara (1935–1939)
- Iisakki Nikkola (1933–1945)
- Hilja Riipinen (1933–1939)
- Yrjö R. Saarinen (1936–1945)
- Bruno A. Salmiala (1933–1945)
- Kaarlo Salovaara (1936–1939)
- Yrjö Schildt (1933–1936)
- Elias Simojoki (1933–1939)
- Arne Somersalo (1933–1936)
- Paavo Susitaival (1939–1940)
- Pekka Tapaninen (L.P., Pietari) (1933–1936)
- Eino Tuomivaara (1933–1939, 1941–1945)
- Pauli Tuorila (1936–1939)
- J. V. Wainio (1933–1945)

== People's Democratic League ==
- Aimo Aaltonen (1945–1962)
- Raila Aho (1987–1990) (changed group to Left Alliance)
- Paavo Aitio (1951–1977)
- Ele Alenius (1966–1977)
- Ulla-Leena Alppi (1976–1987)
- Claes Andersson (1987–1990) (changed group to Left Alliance))
- Asko Apukka (1987–1990) (changed group to Left Alliance))
- Heli Astala (1979–1990) (changed group to Left Alliance))
- Georg Backlund (1953–1954, 1958–1970)
- Ilkka-Christian Björklund (1972–1983)
- Mikko Ekorre (1974–1983)
- Yrjö Enne (1954–1961)
- Toivo Friman (1948–1962, 1966–1970)
- Kelpo Gröndahl (1962–1970)
- Kaino Haapanen (1951–1970, 1974–1975)
- Esko Helle (1983–1990) (changed group to Left Alliance))
- Johan Helo (1945–1946)
- Esa Hietanen (1942–1962)
- Inger Hirvelä López (1979–1987)
- Kauko Hjerppe (1966–1971, 1975–1978)
- Joel Hongisto (1978–1979)
- Kuuno Honkonen (1958–1979)
- Matti Huhta (1945–1948)
- Juho Hukari (1945–1948)
- Anna-Liisa Hyvönen (1972–1980)
- Esteri Häikiö (1951–1954)
- Anna-Liisa Jokinen (1970–1990) (changed group to Left Alliance))
- Toivo Jokiniemi (1975–1979)
- Elli Juntunen (1951–1954)
- Aulis Juvela (1966–1983)
- Matti Järvenpää (1970–1983)
- Mikko Järvinen (1945–1953)
- Toivo Järvinen (1945–1947)
- Markus Kainulainen (1975–1979)
- Veikko Kansikas (1959–1962)
- Lauri Kantola (1962–1975)
- Elsa Karppinen (1945–1948)
- Kalle Kauhanen (1945–1949) (defected from Social Democratic Party group)
- Matti Kautto (1983–1986) (changed group to Democratic Alternative))
- Tauno Kelovesi (1954–1966)
- Arvo Kemppainen (1979–1990) (changed group to Left Alliance))
- Eino Kilpi (1948–1962)
- Kalevi Kilpi (1962–1966)
- Sylvi-Kyllikki Kilpi (1946–1958) (defected from Social Democratic Party group)
- Antti Kinnunen (1951–1958, 1962–1970)
- Aleksi Kiviaho (1954–1970)
- Kalevi Kivistö (1972–1985)
- Osmo Kock (1966–1970, 1972–1974)
- Matti Koivunen (1951–1971)
- Anna-Liisa Korpinen (1951–1974)
- Rauno Korpinen (1972–1975)
- Niilo Koskenniemi (1970–1987)
- Aarne Koskinen (1970–1983)
- Lyyli Koskinen (1962–1969)
- Veikko Kosonen (1948)
- Toivo Kujala (1945–1959)
- Eino Kujanpää (1945–1951)
- Jalmari Kulmala (1945–1948)
- Mikko Kuoppa (1979–1986) (changed group to Democratic Alternative))
- Hertta Kuusinen (1945–1972)
- Olavi Kämäräinen (1962–1966)
- Timo Laaksonen (1983–1990) (changed group to Left Alliance))
- Paavo Lagerroos (1964–1970)
- Pertti Lahtinen (1987–1990) (changed group to Left Alliance))
- Aimo Laiho (1962–1970)
- Ensio Laine (1968–1986) (changed group to Democratic Alternative))
- Olavi J. Laine (1966–1970)
- Eemeli Lakkala (1958–1962)
- Siiri Lehmonen (1958–1979)
- Vilho Lehtonen (1945–1948)
- Yrjö Leino (1945–1951)
- Pekka Leppänen (1983–1990) (changed group to Left Alliance))
- Martti Leskinen (1948–1951, 1954–1958)
- Paavo Leskinen (1945–1952)
- Pentti Liedes (1954–1966, 1970–1983)
- Hemmi Lindqvist (1951–1958)
- Martti Linna (1958–1970)
- Toivo Lång (1945–1948)
- Marja-Liisa Löyttyjärvi (1979–1986) (changed group to Democratic Alternative))
- Hugo Manninen (1945–1970)
- Yrjö Manninen (1945–1948)
- Hellä Meltti (1961–1962)
- Matti Meriläinen (1945–1954, 1958–1962)
- Arto Merisaari (1975–1978)
- Vihtori Metsäranta (1945–1947)
- Unto Miettinen (1954–1958)
- Yrjö Murto (1948–1963)
- Heikki Mustonen (1966–1979, 1983, 1985–1987)
- Janne Mustonen (1945–1962, 1963–1964)
- Sulo Muuri (1945–1948)
- Lauri Myllymäki (1945–1958)
- Juho Mäkelä (1945–1948, 1958–1966)
- Lauha Männistö (1966–1990) (changed group to Left Alliance))
- Judit Nederström-Lundén (1951–1966)
- Anna Nevalainen (1945–1954)
- Niilo Nieminen (1948–1951, 1952–1962, 1969–1975)
- Toivo Niiranen (1951–1966)
- Helvi Niskanen (1970–1983)
- Nestori Nurminen (1945–1962, 1966–1970)
- Juho Nykänen (1951–1954)
- Ville Puumalainen (1945–1954)
- Eino Pekkala (1945–1948)
- Mauno Pekkala (1945–1953) (defected from Social Democratic Party group)
- Kati Peltola (1977–1979, 1980–1983, 1985–1987)
- Mauri Perkonoja (1947–1951)
- Ville Pessi (1945–1966)
- Antto Prunnila (1945–1954, 1958–1962)
- Pauli Puhakka (1954–1983)
- Aarne Pulkkinen (1958–1962, 1962–1970, 1972–1977)
- Terho Pursiainen (1970–1971, 1979–1987)
- Eino Rannikkoluoto (1952–1954)
- Pertti Rapio (1951–1966)
- Heimo Rekonen (1970–1979)
- Kalle Renfors (1948–1954)
- Arvo Riihimäki (1945–1954)
- Ville Riihinen (1945–1951)
- Aleksi Rinne (1945–1948)
- Eino Roine (1945–1951, 1954–1962, 1962–1966)
- Gösta Rosenberg (1945–1966)
- Irma Rosnell (1954–1986) (changed group to Democratic Alternative))
- Unto Ruotsalainen (1975–1983)
- Kaisu-Mirjami Rydberg (1945–1948) (defected from Socialistic parliamentary group)
- Juho Rytkönen (1951–1958)
- Veikko I. Rytkönen (1962–1966)
- Veikko J. Rytkönen (1958–1975, 1978–1983)
- Mauri Ryömä (1945–1958)
- Yrjö Räisänen (1945–1948) (defected from Social Democratic Party group)
- Pauli Räsänen (1966–1979)
- Aarne Saarinen (1962–1970, 1972–1983)
- Veikko Saarto (1966–1987)
- Toivo Salin (1958–1966)
- Pekka Salla (1966–1975)
- Veikko Salmi (1970–1975)
- Esko Seppänen (1987–1990) (changed group to Left Alliance))
- Usko Seppi (1951–1962)
- Pekka Silander (1966–1968)
- Taisto Sinisalo (1962–1979)
- Ilmari Sormunen (1945–1951)
- Elli Stenberg (1945–1966)
- Marjatta Stenius-Kaukonen (1975–1986) (changed group to Democratic Alternative))
- Cay Sundström (1945) (defected from Social Democratic Party group)
- Oili Suomi (1970–1971, 1977–1978)
- Leo Suonpää (1954–1970)
- Vilho Suosalo (1962–1966)
- Reinhold Svento (1945–1948) (defected from Social Democratic Party group)
- Vappu Säilynoja (1979–1990) (changed group to Left Alliance))
- Sten Söderström (1979–1986) (changed group to Democratic Alternative))
- Eino Tainio (1945–1970)
- Konsta Talvio (1945–1948)
- Helge Talvitie (1975–1979)
- Kauko Tamminen (1958–1966, 1967–1983)
- Hannes Tauriainen (1948–1966)
- Esko-Juhani Tennilä (1975–1986) (changed group to Democratic Alternative))
- Olga Terho (1945–1948)
- Fabian Tillanen (1947–1948)
- Seppo Toiviainen (1979–1986) (changed group to Democratic Alternative))
- Irma Torvi (1948–1966)
- Mirjam Tuominen (1970–1979)
- Tyyne Tuominen (1945–1948, 1958–1962)
- Pirkko Turpeinen (1983–1986) (changed group to Democratic Alternative))
- Aukusti Turunen (1948)
- Pauli Uitto (1975–1983, 1986–1990) (changed group to Left Alliance))
- Reino Uusisalmi (1945)
- Aaro Uusitalo (1945–1948)
- Osmo Vepsäläinen (1975–1979, 1983–1987)
- Antti Virtanen (1946–1948)
- Inkeri Virtanen (1958–1962)
- Rainer Virtanen (1954–1971)
- Väinö Virtanen (1958–1970)
- Juhani Vähäkangas (1978–1990) (changed group to Left Alliance))
- Jarmo Wahlström (1975–1983, 1987–1990) (changed group to Left Alliance))
- Kaisu Weckman (1966–1976)
- Karl Wiik (1945–1946) (changed group to Democratic Alternative))
- Atos Wirtanen (1946–1954) (defected from Social Democratic Party group)
- Hella Wuolijoki (1946–1948)
- Toivo Åsvik (1954–1966, 1970–1975)

== People's Party (Agrarian) ==
- Taavetti Heimonen (1917–1918) (defected to National Progressive Party group)
- Erkki Pullinen (1917–1918) (defected from Finnish Party and later to National Progressive Party group)
- Jussi Puumala (1917–1919)
- August Tanttu (1917–1918) (defected to Finnish Party group)
- Kaarlo Vuokoski (1917–1918) (defected to National Progressive Party group)

== People's Party, 1932 ==
- Yrjö Hautala (1933–1936)
- Heikki Niskanen (1933–1939) (defected to Small Farmers' Party / Party of the Small Farmers' and the Rural People group)

== People's Party, 1951 ==
- Lassi Hiekkala
- Armi Hosia
- Veikko Hyytiäinen
- Mikko Juva
- Konsti Järnefelt
- Esa Kaitila
- Kaarlo Kajatsalo
- Heikki Kannisto
- Irma Karvikko
- Harras Kyttä
- Aare Leikola
- Armas Leinonen
- Antti Linna
- Leo Mattila
- Helge Miettunen
- Eino Ojajärvi
- Pentti Pakarinen
- Aukusti Pasanen
- Eino Rauste
- Eino Saari
- Tuure Salo
- Aaro Stykki
- Juho Tenhiälä
- Artturi Tienari

== People's Unity Party ==
- Matti Asunmaa (1972–1977)
- Matti Hannola (1975–1975)
- Kalevi Huotari (1972–1975)
- Heikki Kainulainen (1972–1975)
- Mauno Kurppa (1972–1975)
- Lauri Linna (1972–1975)
- Aune Mänttäri (1972–1975)
- Artturi Niemelä (1972–1975)
- Kalevi Remes (1972–1975)
- Arvo Sainio (1973–1975)
- Viljo Suokas (1972–1975)
- Olavi Tupamäki (1972–1975)
- Hannes Volotinen (1972–1975)

== Reform Group ==
- Risto Kuisma (1998–2001) (defected from Young Finns and later to Social Democratic Party group)

== Rural Party ==
- Sulo Aittoniemi (1987–1994)
- Pentti Antila (1970–1972)
- Riitta-Liisa Arranz (1983–1987)
- Matti Asunmaa (1970–1972)
- Ulla Bogdanoff (1984–1986)
- Vieno Eklund (1982–1987)
- Reijo Enävaara (1983–1984)
- Kalevi Huotari (1970–1972)
- Antti Isomursu (1970–1972)
- Anssi Joutsenlahti (1979–1987)
- Gunnar Joutsensaari (1989–1991)
- Reino Jyrkilä (1983–1987)
- Heikki Kainulainen (1970–1972)
- Pentti Kettunen (1983–1987, 1989–1991)
- J. Juhani Kortesalmi (1970–1989)
- Helvi Koskinen (1983–1987)
- Mauno Kurppa (1970–1972)
- Rainer Lemström (1972–1975)
- Urpo Leppänen (1979–1989)
- Lauri Linna (1970–1972)
- Tina Mäkelä (1987–1994)
- Marita Mäkinen (1987–1995)
- Lea Mäkipää (1983–1995)
- Aune Mänttäri (1970–1972)
- Artturi Niemelä (1970–1972)
- Aarne Penttinen (1970–1972)
- Urho Pohto (1979–1987)
- Eino Poutiainen (1970–1972, 1979)
- Martti Ratu (1983–1986)
- Kalevi Remes (1972–1975)
- Heikki Riihijärvi (1983–1993) (defected to Finnish Front)
- Arvo Sainio (1972–1973)
- Matti Silander (1970–1972)
- Pentti Skön (1983–1987)
- Hannu Suhonen (1991–1994)
- Viljo Suokas (1970–1975)
- Eino Syrjä (1970–1972)
- Olavi Tupamäki (1970–1972)
- Mikko Vainio (1970–1975, 1983–1987)
- Pekka Vennamo (1972–1975, 1979–1989)
- Veikko Vennamo (1959–1962, 1966–1987)
- Raimo Vistbacka (1987–1995) (swifted to the Finns Party)
- Hannes Volotinen (1970–1972)

== Seven Star Movement ==
- Paavo Väyrynen (2018–2019) (formed new group; left the Citizens' Party)

== Small Farmers' Party / Party of the Small Farmers' and the Rural People ==
- Yrjö Kesti (1930–1936)
- Heikki Niskanen (1939–1941) (defected from People's Party (1932) and later to Agrarian League )
- Sigrid Oulasmaa (1933–1936)
- Eino Rytinki (1933–1941) (defected to Agrarian League )

== Social Democratic Party ==
1910s

- Pekka Aakula (1909–1911, 1914–1917)
- Ida Aalle-Teljo (1907–1917)
- Matti Aalto (1907–1908)
- Anton Ahlström (1908–1909)
- Matti Airola (1908–1918)
- Valentin Annala (1909–1918, 1924–1926)
- Werner Aro (1908–1914)
- Emanuel Aromaa (1907–1918, 1929–1933)
- Vihtori Aromaa (1907–1908)
- Nestori Aronen (1909–1918)
- Ville Boman (1909–1911)
- Evert Eloranta (1908–1918)
- Voitto Eloranta (1907–1908)
- Oliver Eronen (1907–1918, 1922–1924)
- Juho Etelämäki (1909–1914)
- Edvard Gylling (1908–1910, 1911–1918)
- Seth Heikkilä (1907–1909, 1910–1911, 1917–1918)
- Ville Heimonen (1907–1908)
- Edvard Helle (1907–1908, 1909–1911, 1919–1921)
- Hilda Herrala (1908–1914, 1917–1918, 1933–1936)
- Matti Hoikka (1907–1914, 1917–1918)
- Evert Hokkanen (1907–1910)
- Anni Huotari (1907–1910, 1911–1918, 1922–1927, 1932–1943)
- Anton Huotari (1908–1910, 1911–1918)
- Pekka (Kalle Petter) Huttunen (1907–1918)
- Samuli Häkkinen (1907–1908, 1914–1918)
- Antti Hämäläinen (1907–1909)
- Kalle Hämäläinen (1907–1914)
- Mimmi Hämäläinen (1909–1911)
- Heikki Häyrynen (1907–1908, 1909–1917)
- Karl Gustaf Höijer (1907–1908)
- Ivar Hörhammer 1909–1911)
- Albert Ingman
- Oskari Jalava
- Georg W. Johansson
- Oscar Johansson
- Alma Jokinen
- Väinö Jokinen
- Olga Jokisalo
- Josua Järvinen
- Oskar Kaipio
- Taavetti Kalliokorpi
- Mimmi Kanervo
- Anshelm Kannisto
- Feliks Kellosalmi
- Aura Kiiskinen
- Jalmari Kirjarinta
- Juho Kirves
- Juho Komu
- Albin Koponen (1907–1918, 1922–1944)
- Juho Korhonen (1908–1909)
- Vilho Korhonen (1908–1909, 1919–1924)
- Frans Koskinen
- Anton Kotonen
- Efraim Kronqvist (1909–1914)
- Otto Wille Kuusinen (1908–1910, 1911–1914, 1917–1918)
- Juho Laakso
- Arvi Lahtinen
- Oskari Fredrik Laine
- Wilho Laine
- Juho Lautasalo
- Sandra Lehtinen
- Frans Lehtonen
- Oskari Leivo
- Heikki Lindroos
- Matti Lonkainen
- Kalle Lumio (1909–1911, 1919–1922)
- William Lundström
- Oskari Lylykorpi
- Atte Mantere
- Janne Martikainen
- Jussi Merinen
- Antti Mäkelin
- Yrjö Mäkelin (1908–1911, 1914–1918)
- Vihtori Mäkelä
- Jaakko Mäki
- Kaarle Mänty
- Pekka Mömmö
- Joel Naaralainen
- Santeri Nuorteva (1907–1908, 1909–1911)
- Oskari Orasmaa
- Matti Paasivuori (1907–1936)
- Maria Paaso
- Antti Partanen
- Penna Paunu
- Emil Perttilä (1907–1908)
- Valfrid Perttilä
- Fiina Pietikäinen (1908–1909)
- Jaakko Piirainen
- Simo Pipatti
- Emanuel Pohjaväre
- Jukka Pohjola
- Hilja Pärssinen (1907–1918, 1929–1935)
- Frans Rantanen
- Samuli Rantanen
- Maria Raunio
- Taavi Rissanen
- Aatu Ruotsalainen
- Santeri Saarikivi (1908–1909, 1910–1911, 1917–1918)
- J. H. Saaristo
- Jussi Sainio
- Eetu Salin
- Kalle Salminen
- Aaro Salo (1907–1914, 1917–1918)
- Anni Savolainen-Tapaninen (1908–1918, 1924–1927)
- Miina Sillanpää (1907–1911, 1914–1917, 1919–1933, 1936–1948)
- Aatto Sirén (1907–1914, 1917–1918, 1929–1920, 1933–1936)
- Yrjö Sirola (1907–1910, 1917–1918)
- Artturi Sivenius
- Aapeli Suomalainen
- Juho Suomalainen
- Vasili Suosaari
- Taavi Tainio (1907–1909, 1911–1914, 1922–1929)
- Väinö Tanner (1907–1911, 1914–1917, 1919–1927, 1930–1944, 1951–1954, 1958–1962)
- Nestori Telkkä
- Paavo Tikkanen
- Oskari Tokoi (1907–1918)
- Onni Tuomi
- Matti Turkia (1907–1909, 1914–1917, 1930–1945)
- O. V. Turunen
- Taneli Typpö (1909–1918, 1922–1929)
- Heikki Törmä (1909–1917, 1919–1922)
- Jenny Upari
- N. R. af Ursin (1907–1908)
- Ville Vainio (1909–1911, 1919–1920)
- Nestori Valavaara
- Albin Valjakka (1907–1918)
- Edvard Valpas-Hänninen (1907–1918)
- August Vesa
- Vihtori Viitanen
- Mikko Virkki
- Sulo Wuolijoki (1907–1914)
- Wäinö Wuolijoki (1907–1910, 1919–1927)

1910s and 1920s

- Artturi Aalto (1919–1933)
- Johan Fredrik Aalto
- Kalle Aalto
- Aleksi Aaltonen
- Hugo Aattela (1929–1945, 1949–1951)
- Fanny Ahlfors (1919–1927, 1930–1933)
- Heikki Ahmala
- Kustaa Ahmala
- Julius Ailio (1919–1922, 1924–1932)
- Toivo Alavirta
- Mikko Ampuja (1919–1941)
- Isak Andersson
- Antero Arho
- Toivo Aro
- Juho Aromaa (1922–1924)
- Viktor Blomqvist
- Tuomas Bryggari
- Otto Elfving (1919–1922, 1926–1927)
- Valfrid Eskola (1922–1924, 1927–1954)
- Jussi Fahler (1927–1929)
- Aino Forsten
- Anna Haapasalo (1919–1922)
- Mimmi Haapasalo (1914–1917)
- Kalle Hakala (1911–1918, 1924–1933, 1934–1947)
- Kalle Fredrik Hakala (1919–1922)
- Väinö Hakkila (1919–1945, 1948–1958)
- Juho Hakkinen
- Aatu Halme
- Alexander Halonen
- Toivo Halonen
- Aapo Harjula
- Kaarlo Harvala (1922–1939)
- Kalle Hautala
- Anna Haverinen (1922–1930)
- Kaarlo Heinonen
- Johan Helo (1919–1922, 1924–1935)
- Tahvo Hiekkaranta
- Leo Hildén
- Olli Hiltunen (1917–1917, 1919–1922)
- Sofia Hjulgrén
- Vihtori Huhta (1914–1917, 1941–1945)
- Anni Huhtinen
- Väinö Hupli
- Herman Hurmevaara (1917–1919)
- Evert Huttunen (1917–1924)
- Pekka (Petter) Huttunen
- Erkki Härmä (1917–1918, 1948–1949)
- Oskari Ikonen
- Rieti Itkonen (1919–1929)
- Heikki Jalonen
- Emil Jokinen
- Juho Kananen (1911–1914, 1919–1922)
- Hanna Karhinen
- Aarne Kauppinen
- Jussi Kautto
- Jaakko Keto (1919–1931)
- Juho Kivikoski
- Ville Kiviniemi
- Väinö Kivisalo
- Jalo Kohonen
- Hanna Kohonen
- Hilma Koivulahti-Lehto (1919–1945, 1948–1951)
- Ville Komu (1927–1942)
- Yrjö Komu (1917–1917, 1922–1927)
- Manu Kontula
- Kustaa Kopila (1910–1911)
- Artturi Koskenkaiku (1919–1922, 1929–1930)
- Janne Korhonen
- Kaarlo Korhonen
- Ville Korhonen (1919–1922)
- August Koskinen
- Jalmari Kovanen
- Edvard Kujala
- Jaakko Kujala
- Jussi Kujala
- Oskari Kunnassalo (1911–1914)
- Severi Kurkinen (1910–1917)
- August Kuusisto (1927–1929, 1930–1945)
- Elias Käkelä
- Adam Laakkonen
- Jonas Laherma
- Jukka Lankila
- Taavetti Lapveteläinen (1911–1918)
- Matti Lassila
- Jaakko Latvala (1911–1914, 1917–1918, 1927–1929)
- Matti Laukkonen
- Antti Lehikoinen (1919–1924, 1927–1930, 1937–1939)
- Juho Lehmus
- Vilho Lehokas
- Konrad Lehtimäki
- Jussi Lehtinen
- Mooses Lehtinen (1919–1922)
- Toivo Lehto
- Aino Lehtokoski (1919–1949)
- Väinö Lehtola
- Väinö Lehtonen
- Jukka Lehtosaari
- Olga Leinonen (1919–1929)
- Emil Leino
- Jussi Leino
- Jalmari Leino (1927–1930)
- Kalle Lepola
- Sulho Leppä
- Paavo Leppänen
- Lauri Letonmäki
- Maikki Letonmäki
- Konsta Lindqvist
- Alfred Lindroos
- Ludvig Lindström (1914–1917)
- Jalmari Linna (1919–1922, 1928–1945, 1949–1951)
- Jussi Lonkainen
- Santeri Louhelainen
- Arvi Louhelainen (1922–1927)
- Jussi Lumivuokko
- Gabriel Luukkonen
- Edla Lyytinen
- Matti Lepistö
- Petter August Leskinen
- Kullervo Manner (1910–1918)
- Otto Marttila (1911–1917, 1922–1924, 1929–1930, 1933–1939)
- Antti Meriläinen (1919–1922, 1930–1939)
- Pekka Meriläinen
- Eliel Mickelsson
- Olli Miettinen
- Atte Muhonen
- Kaapo Murros
- Emil Murto
- Frans Mustasilta (1914–1917, 1924–1927, 1933–1945)
- Kalle Myllymäki
- Santeri Mäkelä
- Vilho Niemi
- Julius Nurminen
- Antero Nyrkkö
- Nestori Nättinen
- Ville Oksman
- Armas Paasonen (1911–1918, 1924–1929, 1930–1933, 1936–1945)
- Eemeli Paronen (1914–1917, 1917–1919)
- Niilo Patinen
- Mikko Pehkonen
- Otto Peitsalo
- Mauno Pekkala (1927–1945)
- Otto Pensas
- Isak Penttala (1926–1951)
- Kustaa Perho (1929–1944)
- Juho Peura
- Vilho Piippo
- Otto Piisinen (1914–1917)
- Matti Puittinen
- Olavi Puro
- Taavi Pöyhönen
- Emil Raearo (1919–1924)
- Jussi Rainio
- Albert Raitanen
- Sikstus Rönnberg
- Viljo Rantala (1922–1962)
- Jussi Rapo (1918–1933, 1936–1939)
- Oskari Reinikainen (1919–1945)
- Juho Rikkonen
- Toivo Rintala
- Wivi Roslander
- Anni Rytkönen
- Hannes Ryömä (1919–1939)
- Kaarlo Saari (1910–1918, 1924–1926)
- Lyydi Saarikivi
- Kustaa Adolf Saarinen
- Emil Saarinen (1910–1918, 1922–1929)
- Emil Sallila
- Hulda Salmi (1910–1918)
- Tyyne Salomaa
- Hilda Seppälä
- Edvard Setälä
- Leander Sirola (1919–1922, 1924–1927, 1929–1930)
- Julius Sundberg
- Mikko Suokas
- Kalle Suosalo
- Oskari Suutala
- Reinhold Svento (1922–1945)
- Aino Takala
- Samuli Tervo (1911–1914, 2927–1929, 1930–1948)
- Jussi Tirkkonen
- Anna Toivari
- Otto Toivonen (1917–1917, 1922–1929, 1933–1945, 1951–1954)
- Jussi Tolonen (1914–1917, 1918–1924, 1927–1951)
- Pekka Tonteri
- Ilmari Tossavainen (1914–1917)
- Jukka Tuomikoski
- Toivo Turtiainen
- Arthur Usenius
- Iisakki Valavaara
- Hilma Valjakka (1919–1930)
- August Valta (1927–1930, 1932–1936)
- Kalle Valta (1927–1933, 1941–1944)
- Väinö Vankkoja (1918–1919)
- Helena Vatanen (1911–1914)
- Jussi Vatanen
- Elviira Vihersalo
- Ida Vihuri (1922–1929)
- Juho Virtanen
- Nikolai Virtanen
- Jussi Vuoristo
- Jalmari Väisänen
- Heikki Välisalmi
- Oskari Väre
- Nestor Väänänen
- Väinö Voionmaa (1919–1947)
- Edvin Wahlstén
- Yrjö Welling (1922–1951)
- Axel Åhlström

1930s and 1940s

- Paavo Aarniokoski
- Kustaa Alanko
- Gunnar Andersson
- Kauko Andersson
- Laura Brander-Wallin
- Karl-August Fagerholm (1930–1966)
- Mikko Erich (^{aik. Kok.}, 1930–1933, 1939–1945)
- Vihtori Fallila
- Yrjö Helenius
- Gunnar Henriksson
- Kaisa Hiilelä
- Onni Hiltunen (1930–1962)
- Emil Huunonen
- Heikki Hykkäälä (1948–1958, 1966–1975)
- Alex Hämäläinen
- Kalle Jokinen
- Arvi Jovero
- Jere Juutilainen
- Veli Järvinen (1948–1951)
- Olavi Kajala (1939–1942, 1948–1951, 1954–1958, 1962–1966)
- Meeri Kalavainen (1948–1979)
- Yrjö Kallinen
- Akseli Kanerva
- Eetu Karjalainen
- Paavo Karjalainen
- Juho Karvonen (1945–1962)
- Kalle Kauhanen
- O. H. Kekäläinen (1939–1945)
- Pekka Kettunen (1933–1936, 1939–1945)
- Viljo Kilpeläinen
- Yrjö Kilpeläinen (1945–1955)
- Eino Kilpi
- Sylvi-Kyllikki Kilpi (1934–1946)
- Artturi Koskinen (1948–1958, 1962–1970)
- Juho Kosonen
- Juho Kuittinen
- Urho Kulovaara
- Ville Kupari
- Walter Kuusela
- Valto Käkelä (1945–1972)
- V. H. Kämäräinen
- Antti Lastu
- Lempi Lehto
- Aleksi Lehtonen
- Tyyne Leivo-Larsson
- Väinö Leskinen (1945–1970)
- Taavi Lindman
- Gottfrid Lindström
- Hjalmar Lindqvist (1930–1933, 1937–1945)
- Kristian Lumijärvi
- Alpo Lumme (1933–1949)
- J. E. Malmivuori
- Toivo Mansner
- Elsa Metsäranta
- Otto Muikku (1945–1958)
- Onni Mäkeläinen
- Pentti Niemi
- Toivo Nokelainen
- Elli Nurminen
- Taavetti Nuutinen
- Rafael Paasio (1948–1975)
- Arvo Paasivuori
- Niilo Pajunen
- Martti Peltonen (1939–1945)
- Onni Peltonen (1933–1962)
- Edvard Pesonen (1933–1939, 1943–1966)
- Heikki Pesonen
- Anselmi Pitkäsilta
- Eeno Pusa (1945–1951, 1956–1958)
- Juho Pyy
- Toivo Pyörtänö (1948–1951)
- Jussi Raatikainen (1936–1951)
- Uuno Raatikainen (1936–1948)
- Pekka Railo (1941–1944)
- Eino Raunio (1939–1970)
- Kaisu-Mirjami Rydberg (1939–1941)
- Mauri Ryömä (1936–1937)
- Yrjö Räisänen (1930–1941)
- Martta Salmela-Järvinen (1939–1958)
- Pietari Salmenoja
- Oskari Salonen
- Väinö Salovaara (1939–1945)
- Heikki Simonen (1939–1951)
- Väinö Sinisalo
- Cay Sundström (1936–1941)
- August Syrjänen
- Arvo Sävelä
- Uuno Takki (1945–1952, 1966–1968)
- Penna Tervo (1945–1956)
- Armas Tolonen
- Antti Tossavainen
- Jorma Tuominen (1940–1945)
- Arvi Turkka (1933–1945, 1948–1958)
- Varma K. Turunen (1939–1962)
- Unto Varjonen
- Vilho Väyrynen
- K. J. Wenman
- Atos Wirtanen (1936–1946)

1950s and 1960s

- Lyyli Aalto (1958–1979)
- Arvo Ahonen (1951–1979)
- Eero Antikainen
- Pirkko Aro (1973–1979)
- Reino Breilin (1966–1983)
- Pauli Burman (1966–1970, 1974–1975)
- Georg Eriksson
- Margit Eskman (1966–1975)
- Anni Flinck (1954–1975)
- Kalervo Haapasalo (1951–1975)
- Antti Halme (1966–1970, 1973–1975)
- Vappu Heinonen
- Veikko Helle (1951–1983)
- Voitto Hellstén (1962–1970)
- Kaarlo af Heurlin (1966–1970)
- Sulo Hostila (1956–1975)
- Mikko Hult (1954–1958)
- Eero Häkkinen
- Seija Karkinen (1966–1983, 1987–1991)
- Urho Knuuti (1966–1972)
- Sakari Knuuttila (1966–1991)
- Veikko Kokkola (1951–1970)
- Pekka Kuusi (1966–1970)
- Mikko Laaksonen (1966–1971)
- Valdemar Liljeström (1955–1958)
- Bror Lillqvist (1966–1983)
- Olavi Lindblom (1954–1966)
- Lars Lindeman (1958–1976)
- Ilmari Linna (1962–1970)
- Sinikka Luja-Penttilä (1966–1983)
- Impi Lukkarinen (1951–1958)
- Elis Manninen (1958–1966)
- Kalle Matilainen (1956–1970)
- Veikko Mattila (1964–1970)
- Erkki Mohell
- Uljas Mäkelä (1962–1978)
- Väinö Mäkinen (1966–1975)
- Valde Nevalainen (1966–1975)
- Esko Niskanen (1966–1975)
- Ilmo Paananen (1966–1972)
- Tyyne Paasivuori (1954–1958, 1962–1974)
- Ensio Partanen (1958–1970)
- Antti Pennanen (1966–1970)
- Antti-Veikko Perheentupa (1966–1972)
- Kaarlo Pitsinki (1958–1966)
- Lauri Puntila (1966–1970)
- Akseli Rodén (1964–1970, 1972–1975)
- Aune Salama (1966–1975)
- Arvo Salo (1966–1970, 1979–1983)
- Eero Salo (1968–1975)
- Valdemar Sandelin (1962–1973)
- Sylvi Siltanen (1958–1972)
- Aarre Simonen (1951–1958)
- Eino Sirén
- Bruno Sundman (1951–1958)
- Unto Suominen
- Edit Terästö (1962–1972)
- Ville Tikkanen (1966–1975)
- Väinö Tikkaoja
- Arvo Tuominen (1958–1962)
- Heikki Törmä (1958–1959)
- Väinö Vilponiemi (1962–1975)
- Viljo Virtanen (1951–1970)
- Uki Voutilainen (1962–1979)
- Antero Väyrynen (1962–1970)

1970s and 1980s

- Markus Aaltonen (1975–1991, 1995–1999)
- Matti Ahde (1970–1990, 2003–2011)
- Risto Ahonen (1983–1991)
- Aimo Ajo (1972–1991)
- Pirjo Ala-Kapee (1979–1989)
- Arja Alho (1983–1999, 2003–2007)
- Jouni Backman (1987–2007, 2011–2015)
- Aarno von Bell (1983–1987, 1990–1995)
- Ilkka-Christian Björklund (^{aik. SKDL}, 1987–1991)
- Kaj Bärlund (1979–1991)
- Paula Eenilä (1975–1987)
- Mikko Elo (1979–1991, 1995–2007)
- Mauno Forsman (1971–1983)
- Ralf Friberg (1970–1979)
- Eino Grönholm (1975–1983)
- Jukka Gustafsson (1987–)
- Iiris Hacklin (1987–1995)
- Tarja Halonen (1979–2000)
- Olli Helminen (1975–1987)
- Pertti Hietala (1979–1991)
- Sinikka Hurskainen (1983–1999, 2003–2011)
- Niilo Hämäläinen (1979–1983)
- Tuulikki Hämäläinen (1983–1999)
- Liisa Jaakonsaari (1979–2009)
- Ilkka Joenpalo (1987–1991, 1995–1997)
- Sven-Erik Järvinen (1975–1979)
- Riitta Järvisalo (1972–1979, 1982–1991)
- Osmo Kaipainen (1970–1975)
- Kai Kalima (1989–1991)
- Antti Kalliomäki (1983–2011)
- Anna-Liisa Kasurinen (1979–1995)
- Tarja Kautto (1989–2003)
- Antero Kekkonen (1987–2007)
- Leo Kohtala (1970–1975)
- (Taimi) Tellervo Koivisto (1972–1975)
- Tellervo Maria Koivisto (1970–1982)
- Matti Kuusio (1975–1979, 1983–1987)
- Pentti Lahti-Nuuttila
- Eero Laine (1970–1971)
- Jermu Laine (1975–1987)
- Arto Lapiolahti
- Lasse Lehtinen (1972–1983)
- Eeli Lepistö
- Erkki Liikanen (1972–1990)
- Reijo Lindroos
- Paavo Lipponen (1983–1987, 1991–2007)
- Eino Loikkanen
- Matti Louekoski (1976–1979, 1983–1996)
- Matti Luttinen (1975–1995)
- Martti Lähdesmäki
- Lauri Metsämäki
- Jukka Mikkola (1983–1987, 1995–2003)
- Peter Muurman
- Riitta Myller (1987–1995, 2011–)
- Pekka Myllyniemi (1983–1987)
- Salme Myyryläinen
- Jouko Mäkelä
- Sinikka Mönkäre (1987–1991, 1995–2006)
- Mats Nyby (1983–1999)
- Saara-Maria Paakkinen (1979–1995)
- Reino Paasilinna (1983–1990, 1995–1996)
- Pertti Paasio (1975–1975, 1982–1996)
- Veikko Pajunen (1972–1979)
- Markku Pohjola (1987–1991, 1995–1999)
- Antti Pohjonen (1972–1977)
- Matti Puhakka (1975–1991, 1995–1996)
- Virpa Puisto (1987–2007)
- Raimo Päivinen
- Kaisa Raatikainen (1970–1987)
- Pentti Rajala
- Kari Rajamäki (1983–2015)
- Maija Rajantie
- Jussi Ranta
- Jorma Rantala (1972–1983)
- Jorma Rantanen (1983–1987, 1991–1999)
- Juhani Raudasoja
- Heikki Rinne (1983–1999)
- Jukka Roos (1987–1999, 2003–2007)
- Timo Roos (1983–1995)
- Mikko Rönnholm (1979–1987, 1991–1995)
- Matti Saarinen (1987–1991, 1995–2015)
- Kaarle Salmivuori
- Tuula Sarja
- Lea Savolainen (1975–1995)
- Helge Sirén
- Jouko Skinnari (1980–2015)
- Kalevi Sorsa (1970–1991)
- Pekka Starast (1979–1987)
- Keijo Suksi
- Ulf Sundqvist (1970–1983)
- Kaarina Suonio (1975–1986)
- Juhani Surakka (1975–1987)
- Jacob Söderman (1972–1983, 2007–2011)
- Ilkka Taipale (1970–1975, 2000–2007)
- Hannu Tapiola (1979–1983)
- Arto Tiainen (1970)
- Paavo Tiilikainen (1970–1979)
- Seppo Tikka (1972–1987)
- Risto Tuominen
- Erkki Tuomioja (1970–1979, 1991–)
- Jouko Tuovinen (1975–1987)
- Väinö Turunen
- Marja-Liisa Tykkyläinen (1983–2007)
- Pirkko Työläjärvi (1972–1985)
- Kerttu Törnqvist (1983–1999)
- Kari Urpilainen (1983–1995, 1999–2007)
- Pirkko Valtonen (1978–1983, 1985–1987)
- Raimo Vuoristo (1987–1995)
- Matti Vähänäkki (1987–2003)

1990s and 2000s

- Marko Asell (2007–2011, 2019–)
- Arto Bryggare (1995–1999, 2003–2007)
- Maarit Feldt-Ranta (2007–2019)
- Tarja Filatov (1995–)
- Maria Guzenina (2007–)
- Tuula Haatainen (1996–2007, 2015–)
- Eero Heinäluoma (2003–2019)
- Klaus Hellberg (1995–2007)
- Rakel Hiltunen (1999–2015)
- Raimo Holopainen (1996–1999)
- Susanna Huovinen (1999–2018)
- Ulpu Iivari (1991–1995)
- Ulla Juurola (1995–2003)
- Reijo Kallio (1995–2011)
- Erkki Kanerva (1999–2003)
- Ilkka Kantola (2007–2019)
- Saara Karhu (1999–2015)
- Tapio Karjalainen (1995–2003)
- Anneli Kiljunen (2003–)
- Kimmo Kiljunen (1995–2011, 2019–)
- Krista Kiuru (2007–)
- Valto Koski (1995–2011)
- Johannes Koskinen (1991–2015, 2019–)
- Marjaana Koskinen (1995–2011)
- Risto Kuisma (1995–1997, 2002–2007, 2010–2011) (defected to Young Finns and later to Reformist group)
- Jorma Kukkonen (1995–1999)
- Miapetra Kumpula-Natri (2003–2014)
- Merja Kuusisto (2007–2015)
- Lauri Kähkönen (1995–2011)
- Erja Lahikainen (1991–1995)
- Esa Lahtela (1995–2011)
- Reijo Laitinen (1991–2011)
- Minna Lintonen (2003–2007)
- Päivi Lipponen (2007–2015)
- Leena Luhtanen (1991–2007)
- Kyllikki Muttilainen (1990–1995)
- Raimo Mähönen (1995–2003)
- Arja Ojala (1991–1999)
- Reino Ojala (1995–1999, 2003–2007)
- Johanna Ojala-Niemelä (2007–)
- Kalevi Olin (1995–2007)
- Heli Paasio (1999–2015)
- Sirpa Paatero (2006–)
- Erkki J. Partanen (1995–1999)
- Pirkko Peltomo (1991–2007)
- Tuula Peltonen (2007–2015)
- Raimo Piirainen (2009–2015, 2019–)
- Tuija Pohjola (1995–1999)
- Riitta Prusti (1995–1999)
- Susanna Rahkonen (1999–2007)
- Maija Rask (1991–2007)
- Tero Rönni (1995–2011)
- Arto Seppälä (1999–2007)
- Tommy Tabermann (2007–2010)
- Säde Tahvanainen (1995–2007)
- Katja Taimela (2007–)
- Satu Taiveaho (2003–2011)
- Jutta Urpilainen (2003–2019)
- Helena Vartiainen (1996–1999)
- Marjatta Vehkaoja (1991–2003)
- Janne Viitamies (1995–1999)
- Pauliina Viitamies (2007–2015)
- Pia Viitanen (1995–)
- Marja-Leena Viljamaa (1991–1999)
- Antti Vuolanne (2003–2011)
- Tuula Väätäinen (2003–2015, 2019–)
- Harry Wallin (1999–2007, 2014–2019)

2010s

- Hussein al-Taee (2019–)
- Kim Berg (2019–)
- Eeva-Johanna Eloranta (2011–)
- Seppo Eskelinen (2019–)
- Timo Harakka (2015–)
- Eveliina Heinäluoma (2019–)
- Lauri Ihalainen (2011–2019)
- Mikael Jungner (2011–2015)
- Mika Kari (2011–)
- Johan Kvarnström (2019–)
- Suna Kymäläinen (2011–)
- Jukka Kärnä (2011–2015)
- Aki Lindén (2019–)
- Antti Lindtman (2011–)
- Niina Malm (2019–)
- Sanna Marin (2015–)
- Riitta Mäkinen (2018–)
- Merja Mäkisalo-Ropponen (2011–)
- Matias Mäkynen (2019–)
- Ilmari Nurminen (2015–)
- Piritta Rantanen (2019–)
- Nasima Razmyar (2015–2017)
- Antti Rinne (2015–)
- Joona Räsänen (2015–2019)
- Kristiina Salonen (2011–)
- Ville Skinnari (2015–)
- Satu Taavitsainen (2015–2019)
- Hanna Tainio (2011–2015)
- Maria Tolppanen (2016–) (defected from the Finns Party's group)
- Pilvi Torsti (2017–2019)
- Tytti Tuppurainen (2011–)
- Heidi Viljanen (2019–)
- Paula Werning (2019–)

== Social Democratic Union of Workers and Smallholders ==
- Laura Brander-Wallin 1962
- Vappu Heinonen 1958–1962, 1966–1970 (defected from Social Democratic Party)
- Mikko Hult 1958–1962 (defected from Social Democratic Party)
- Armas Härkönen 1958–1962
- Urho Kulovaara 1958–1962 (defected from Social Democratic Party)
- Tyyne Leivo-Larsson 1966–1970
- Valdemar Liljeström 1958–1960 (defected from Social Democratic Party)
- Impi Lukkarinen 1958–1970 (defected from Social Democratic Party)
- Aino Malkamäki 1960–1961
- Viljo Pousi 1966–1970
- Eeno Pusa 1961–1962
- Olavi Saarinen 1966–1970
- Martta Salmela-Järvinen 1958–1966 (defected from Social Democratic Party)
- Aili Siiskonen 1958–1962, 1966–1970
- Aarre Simonen 1958–1962 (defected from Social Democratic Party)
- Arvo Sävelä 1958–1962 (defected from Social Democratic Party)
- Arvi Turkka 1958–1962 (defected from Social Democratic Party)
- Vilho Turunen 1958–1962
- Heikki Törmä 1959–1962 (defected from Social Democratic Party)
- Olli J. Uoti 1959–1962, 1966–1967

== Socialistic parliamentary group ==
- Mikko Ampuja (1940–1941, 1944–1945) (defected from Social Democratic Party group)
- Väinö Meltti (1941, 1944–1945)
- Kaisu-Mirjami Rydberg (1940–1941, 1944–1945) (defected from Social Democratic Party and later to People's Democratic League group)
- Yrjö Räisänen (1940–1941, 1944–1945) (defected from Social Democratic Party and later to People's Democratic League group)
- Cay Sundström (1940–1941, 1944–1945) (defected from Social Democratic Party and later to People's Democratic League group)
- Karl Harald Wiik (1940–1941, 1944–1945) (defected from Social Democratic Party and later to People's Democratic League group)

== Socialistic Workers and Smallholders Parliamentary group ==
- Aleksander Allila 1924–1927
- Aatami Asikainen 1924–1929
- Yrjö Enne 1927–1928
- Verner Halén 1929–1930
- Edvard Huttunen 1924–1925
- Ida Hämäläinen 1927–1929
- August Isaksson 1924–1929
- Edvard Jokela 1924–1927
- Väinö Kallio 1929–1930
- Juho Komulainen 1924–1927
- Kalle Kulmala 1924–1930
- Martta Kurkilahti 1927
- Kalle Kyhälä 1929–1930
- Toivo Latva 1927–1928
- Yrjö Lehtinen 1927–1929
- Arvo Lehto 1929–1930
- Jaakko Liedes 1924–1930
- Kalle Meriläinen 1929–1930
- Lauri Myllymäki 1927–1930
- Aukusti Mäenpää 1930
- Uno Nurminen 1924–1927
- Eino Pekkala 1927–1930
- Juho Perälä 1928–1930
- Taavi Pitkänen 1927
- Väinö Pohjaranta 1929–1930
- Emanuel Ramstedt 1924–1929
- Arvo Riihimäki 1927–1930
- Mauritz Rosenberg 1924–1930
- Janne Räsänen 1924–1927
- Jalmari Rötkö 1929–1930
- Asser Salo 1929–1930
- Filemon Savenius 1924–1929
- Salomo Savolainen 1927–1929
- Antti Soikkeli 1924–1927
- Pekka Strengell 1924–1927, 1928–1930
- Emil Tabell 1924–1930
- Konsta Talvio 1929–1930
- William Tanner 1927–1930
- Bruno Tenhunen 1924
- Aukusti Turunen 1927–1930
- Siina Urpilainen 1927–1930
- Kaarlo Varho 1926–1927
- Jalmari Virta 1924–1930
- Konsta Vuokila 1924
- Svantte Vuorio 1924–1925
- Heikki Väisänen 1929–1930

== Socialist Workers' Party ==
- Elin Airamo (1922–1923)
- Toivo Aronen (1922–1923)
- Jaakko Enqvist (1922–1923)
- Väinö Hannula (1922–1923)
- Hilda Hannunen (1920–1923)
- Frans Hiilos (1922–1923)
- Laura Härmä (1922–1923)
- Albert Kallio (1922–1923)
- Kalle Kankari (1922–1923)
- Pekka Kemppi (1922–1923)
- Aukusti Koivisto (1922–1923)
- Kalle Lampinen (1922–1923)
- Toivo Hjalmar Långström (1922–1923)
- Emmi Mäkelin (1922–1923)
- Heikki Mäkinen (1922–1923)
- Antti Nahkala (1922–1923)
- Pekka Nurmiranta (1922–1923)
- Hannes Pulkkinen (1922–1923)
- August Rytkönen (1922–1923)
- Rosa Sillanpää (1922–1923)
- Kalle Toppinen (1922–1923)
- Lempi Tuomi (1922–1923)
- Vihtori Vainio (1923–1923)
- Ville Vainio (1920–1923)
- Yrjö Valkama (1922–1923)
- Juho Vesterlund (1922–1923)
- Matti Väisänen (1922)

== Swedish People's Party ==
- Anders Adlercreutz (2015–)
- Frans Ahlroos (1907–1909)
- Kristian von Alfthan (1907–1909)
- Torsten Aminoff (1960–1962)
- Amos Anderson (1922–1927)
- Elis Andersson (1959–1966)
- Ossian Aschan (1910–1911)
- Johannes Bengs (1922–1924)
- Sandra Bergqvist (2019–)
- Eva Biaudet (1991–2006, 2015–)
- Matts Björk (1910–1914, 1917–1919, 1924–1927, 1930–1933)
- Konrad Björkstén (1909–1910)
- Gustav Björkstrand (1987–1991)
- Thomas Blomqvist (2007–)
- Elsa Bonsdorff (1936–1945)
- Ernst von Born (1919–1954)
- Viktor Magnus von Born (1910–1914)
- Adolf Bredenberg (1914–1917)
- Klaus Bremer (1995–2003)
- Johan Broman (1927–1929)
- Albert Brommels (1945–1951)
- Johan Broända (1919–1924)
- Lennart Byman (1922)
- Immanuel Bäck (1922–1924, 1927–1930)
- Johannes Bäck (1907–1914, 1917–1919)
- Axel Cederberg (1907–1909)
- Rafael Colliander (1909–1910, 1917–1924, 1927–1930, 1933–1938)
- Jörn Donner (1987–1995, 2007, 2013–2015)
- Georg C. Ehrnrooth (1958–1973) (formed new group; Constitutional People's Party)
- Leo Ehrnrooth (1907–1909, 1917)
- Artur Eklund (1919–1922)
- Jan-Erik Enestam (1991–2007)
- Rainer Erlund (1999) (formed new group; Group Erlund)
- Ernst Estlander (1907–1914, 1917–1945)
- Anders Forsberg (1924–1930)
- John Forsberg (1954–1958)
- Arthur af Forselles (1919–1922)
- Jenny af Forselles (1909–1910, 1911–1917)
- Matts Forss (1945–1951)
- Johan Franzén (1935–1936)
- Erik von Frenckell (1927–1939)
- Alexander Frey (1917)
- Ole Frietsch (1936–1945)
- Annie Furuhjelm (1914–1924, 1927–1929)
- Ragnar Furuhjelm (1917–1944)
- Alexander Gadolin (1914–1917)
- Christina Gestrin (2000–2015)
- Kristian Gestrin (1962–1979)
- George Granfelt (1908–1909, 1910–1911, 1912–1914)
- Nils-Anders Granvik (1999–2007)
- Ragnar Granvik (1966–1979)
- Julius Grotenfelt (1910–1914)
- Fridolf Gustafsson (1907–1908)
- Gustaf Gädda (1910–1919)
- Lars Gästgivars (2011–2015)
- Edvard Haga (1929–1944)
- Carl Haglund (2015–2016)
- Mauritz Hallberg (1910–1911)
- Reinhold Hedberg (1907–1909, 1917–1919)
- Walter Heimbürger (1908–1909)
- Edvard Helenelund (1919–1924, 1927–1929, 1930–1945)
- Pähr-Einar Hellström (1985–1987)
- Anna-Maja Henriksson (2007–)
- Uno Hildén (1930–1933, 1936–1945)
- Viktor Hintz (1929–1930)
- Vera Hjelt (1908–1917)
- Ture Hollstén (1945–1948, 1951–1954)
- Einar Holmberg (1939–1945)
- Mårten Holmberg (1909–1910)
- Eirik Hornborg (1917–1922, 1924–1927)
- Evald Häggblom (1966–1976)
- Gunnar Häggblom (1976–1983)
- Emil Hästbacka (1917–1948)
- Sven Högström (1954–1966)
- Johannes Inborr (1909–1919, 1922–1933)
- William Isaksson (1914–1917)
- Otto Jacobsson (1924–1934)
- Gunnar Jansson (1983–2003)
- Roger Jansson (2003–2007)
- Oskar Jeppson (1922–1924)
- Levi Jern (1922–1954)
- Hugo Johansson (1939–1945)
- Johannes Jungarå (1958–1966)
- Axel Juselius (1909–1910)
- Karl Julian Karlsson (1907–1908)
- Johannes Klockars (1924–1927)
- Verner Korsbäck (1948–1972)
- Augusta Krook (1909–1910)
- Evert Kulenius (1922–1927)
- Magnus Kull (1966–1970)
- Berndt Kullberg (1927–1929)
- Henrik Kullberg (1927–1930, 1933–1945, 1945–1953)
- Gunnar Landtman (1922–1924)
- Arthur Larson (1948–1959)
- Karl Laurén (1919–1922, 1924–1927, 1929–1930, 1936–1939)
- Per Laurén (1962–1966)
- Henrik Lax (1987–2004)
- Axel Lille (1917)
- Gustaf Lindberg (1924–1930)
- Julius Lindberg (1914–1917, 1922–1924)
- Uno Lindelöf (1909–1914)
- Bertel Lindh (1953–1966)
- Mats Löfström (2015–)
- Pehr Löv (1995–2007)
- Håkan Malm (1975–1999)
- Josef Mangs (1924–1927, 1929–1930, 1933–1936, 1939–1945)
- Herman Mattsson (1933–1936, 1938–1939)
- Leo Mechelin (1910–1914)
- Nils Meinander (1945–1962)
- Ingvar S. Melin (1966–1972, 1975–1983, 1987–1991)
- Gustaf Mickels (1922–1924)
- Johannes Miemois (1914–1917, 1919–1924)
- Knut Molin (1924–1930, 1932–1933)
- Elisabeth Nauclér (2007–2015)
- Arvid Neovius (1907–1917)
- Dagmar Neovius (1907–1909, 1910–1911, 1914–1917)
- Oskar Nix (1907–1910, 1919–1922)
- Kurt Nordfors (1951–1966)
- Ivar Nordlund (1909–1912)
- Håkan Nordman (1983–1995, 1999–2003, 2007–2011)
- Torsten Nordström (1936–1939, 1951–1962, 1966–1970)
- Anders Norrback (2019–)
- Ole Norrback (1979–1981, 1991–1999)
- August Nybergh (1910–1914)
- Mikaela Nylander (2003–2019)
- Mats Nylund (2007–2019)
- Kuno Nyman (1930–1936, 1944–1945)
- Per-Henrik Nyman (1987–1991)
- Jakob Näs (1907–1908)
- Karl Oljemark (1907–1908)
- Mikko Ollikainen (2019–)
- Karl Ottelin (1917–1919)
- Axel Palmgren (1917–1922, 1924–1936)
- Margareta Pietikäinen (1991–2003)
- Hjalmar J. Procopé (1919–1922, 1924–1926)
- Victor Procopé (1958–1962, 1966–1975)
- August Ramsay (1919–1922)
- Elisabeth Rehn (1979–1995)
- Veronica Rehn-Kivi (2016–)
- Boris Renlund (1979–1995)
- Eric von Rettig (1917–1919)
- Emil Roos (1917, 1930–1933)
- Wilhelm Roos (1909–1917, 1917–1924)
- Ola Rosendahl (1995–2003)
- Gustaf Rosenqvist (1907–1919)
- Vilhelm Rosenqvist (1907–1909)
- Torsten Rothberg (1930–1933)
- Johan Wilhelm Runeberg (1907–1908)
- Frans Sandblom (1922–1924)
- Carl Sanmark (1929–1930)
- Emil Sarlin (1930–1933)
- Oskar Schultz (1907–1908)
- Emil Schybergson (1907–1909, 1910–1919)
- Elly Sigfrids (1970–1979)
- Johan Sjöblom (1933–1936)
- Otto Slätis (1907–1908)
- Helmer Smeds (1945–1948)
- Hedvig Sohlberg (1908–1914)
- Gösta Stenbäck (1908–1910, 1914–1917)
- Pär Stenbäck (1970–1985)
- Fredrik Stenström (1909–1910)
- Edvin Stenwall (1936–1939)
- Albert Stigzelius (1908–1909)
- Johan Storbjörk (1907–1917)
- Johannes Storbjörk (1917)
- Joakim Strand (2015–)
- Gustaf Storgårds (1914–1917)
- Johan Strömberg (1909–1910, 1911–1917)
- Julius Sundblom (1907–1919)
- Alwar Sundell (1958–1966)
- Johan Otto Söderhjelm (1933–1939, 1944–1951, 1962–1966)
- Karl Söderholm (1907–1914, 1917)
- Gunnar Takolander (1914–1917)
- Carl Olof Tallgren (1961–1975)
- Christoffer Taxell (1975–1991)
- Grels Teir (1951–1975)
- Astrid Thors (2003, 2004–2013)
- Raimo Tiilikainen (1995–1999)
- Eric von Troil (1908–1917)
- August Tåg (1911–1919, 1927–1929)
- Adolf Törngren (1914–1917)
- Ralf Törngren (1936–1961)
- Stefan Wallin (2007–2019)
- Osvald Wasastjerna (1907–1908)
- Ole Wasz-Höckert (1983–1991)
- Henrik Westerlund (1966–1995)
- Wilhelm Westman (1930–1933)
- Emil Wichmann (1908–1909)
- Albin Wickman (1933–1958, 1962–1966)
- Ulla-Maj Wideroos (1995–2015)
- Johannes Wiik (1917)
- Rolf Witting (1924–1927)
- Rabbe Axel Wrede (1910–1914, 1917–1919)
- Ferdinand von Wright (1922–1924)
- Jutta Zilliacus (1975–1987)
- Kristian Åkerblom (1917, 1919–1929, 1930–1933)
- Otto Åkesson (1917–1919)
- Arne Öhman (1948–1958)
- Ebba Östenson (1933–1936, 1939–1954)
- John Österholm (1919–1960)

== Young Finnish Party ==
- Pekka Ahmavaara (1907–1917, 1917–1918)
- Santeri Alkio (1907) (defected to Agrarian League group)
- Erik Alopaeus
- Gustaf Arokallio (1907–1909, 1910–1918)
- Juho Astala
- Helena Brander (1917–1918)
- Uuno Brander (1907–1910, 1911–1917)
- Arthur Castrén (1909–1913)
- Jonas Castrén (1907–1917)
- Zachris Castrén (1909–1910)
- Eero Erkko (1907–1918)
- Aleksanteri Fränti (1909–1914, 1917)
- Kustavi Grotenfelt (1908–1909)
- Lucina Hagman (1907–1908, 1917)
- Edvard Hannula (1909–1914)
- Juho Haveri (1907–1908, 1909–1910)
- Samppa Heiskanen
- Gabriel Hirvensalo (1914–1917)
- Rudolf Holsti (1914–1918)
- Theodor Homén (1908–1914)
- Tekla Hultin (1908–1918)
- Nestor Huoponen (1907–1909)
- Pekka Hälvä
- Kustaa Jalkanen (1911–1914)
- Väinö Juustila (1918)
- Antti Kaasalainen
- Teuvo Kaitila
- Kyösti Kanniainen
- Juho Kaskinen (1908–1910, 1911–1917)
- Matti Kekki (1910–1911)
- Juho Keltanen
- Kustaa Killinen
- Mikko Knuutila (1907–1908)
- William Koskelin (1907–1909, 1910–1911, 1917)
- Pietari Kuisma
- Juhani Kurikka
- Martti Kykkling
- Augusta Laine (1917–1918)
- Johannes Laine
- Juho Laitinen
- Mikko Latva
- Pekka Leppänen (1907–1908)
- Hugo Lilius
- Oskar Lilius
- Eemil Linna (1913–1917, 1917–1918)
- Hugo Linna (1917)
- Johannes Lundson (1917–1918)
- Albert Luoma
- Tilda Löthman-Koponen (1910–1911, 1914–1917, 1917–1919)
- Antti Mikkola (1907–1908, 1909–1910, 1917–1918)
- Akseli Nikula (1914–1917)
- Alli Nissinen
- Oskar Nissinen
- Aapo Nuora (1909–1910, 1911–1914)
- Hannes Nylander
- Pekka Paavolainen (1914–1919)
- Erkki Peltonen
- Pekka Pennanen (1907–1919)
- Matti Pesonen (1907–1908)
- Otto Pesonen
- Matti Pietinen
- Onni Puhakka (1910–1914)
- Heikki Renvall (1907–1908, 1910–1914)
- Tahvo Riihelä (1907–1914)
- Heikki Ritavuori (1914–1917)
- Mauno Rosendal
- Jaakko Saariaho (1913–1914)
- Eemil Nestor Setälä (1907–1909, 1910–1911, 1917–1918)
- Elias Sinkko (1909–1910, 1914–1918)
- Juho Snellman (1907–1908, 1909–1914, 1917–1918)
- Elias Sopanen (1914–1917)
- Otto Stenroth (1908–1909)
- Kaarlo Juho Ståhlberg (1908–1910, 1914–1918)
- Pehr Evind Svinhufvud (1907–1917)
- Wille Särkkä (1917–1918)
- Onni Talas (1909–1918)
- August Tanttu (1908–1909, 1910–1917)
- Otto Thuneberg (1917)
- Eemil Vekara
- Kalle Viljakainen (1907–1913)
- Kaarlo Wikman
- Emil Åkesson (1909–1911)

== Young Finns ==
- Risto Kuisma (1997–1998) 1994–1995) (defected from Social Democratic Party and later to Reformist group)
- Risto E. J. Penttilä (1995–1999)
- Jukka Tarkka (1995–1999)
