= Kustaa Adolf Kakriainen =

Finnish farmer and politician (1857–1935)

Gustaf Adolf (Kustaa Adolf) Kakriainen (18 September 1857 – 9 July 1935) was a Finnish farmer and politician, born in Mikkeli. He was a member of the Parliament of Finland from 1910 to 1911, representing the Agrarian League (ML).
