= Albin Asikainen =

Finnish politician

Albinus (Albin) Asikainen (24 March 1873, Mikkelin maalaiskunta – 15 November 1948) was a Finnish farmer and politician. He was a member of the Parliament of Finland from 1929 to 1948, representing the Agrarian League.
