= Jakob Näs =

Finnish politician

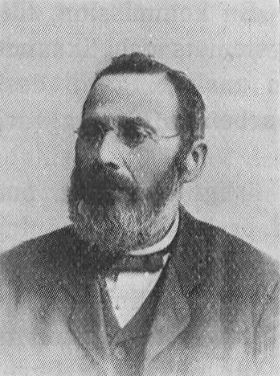
Jacob Näs

Jakob Näs (30 October 1842, Munsala - 9 March 1918) was a Finnish farmer and politician. He was a member of the Diet of Finland from 1894 to 1906 and of the Parliament of Finland from 1907 to 1908, representing the Swedish People's Party of Finland (SFP).
