= Johannes Wiik =

Finnish farmer and politician (1873–1972)

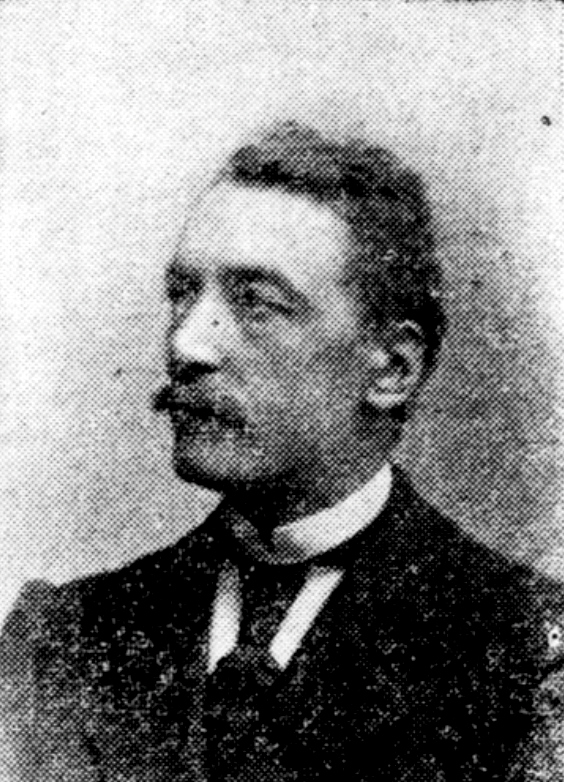
Wiik in 1958

Johannes Wiik (1 April 1873 – 26 March 1972) was a Finnish farmer and politician, born in Kvevlax. He was a member of the Parliament of Finland from 1916 to 1917, representing the Swedish People's Party of Finland.
