= Antti Halme =

Finnish politician (1923–1996)

Antti Alarik Halme (4 March 1923 – 10 June 1996) was a Finnish politician, born in Akaa. He was a member of the Parliament of Finland from 1966 to 1970 and from 1973 to 1975, representing the Social Democratic Party of Finland (SDP).
