= Lauri Tuunanen =

Finnish farmer and politician (1866–1939)

Lauri Tuunanen (12 April 1866 – 26 June 1939) was a Finnish farmer and politician, born in Uukuniemi. He was a member of the Parliament of Finland from 1907 to 1910, representing the Agrarian League.
