= Leo Hildén =

Finnish politician

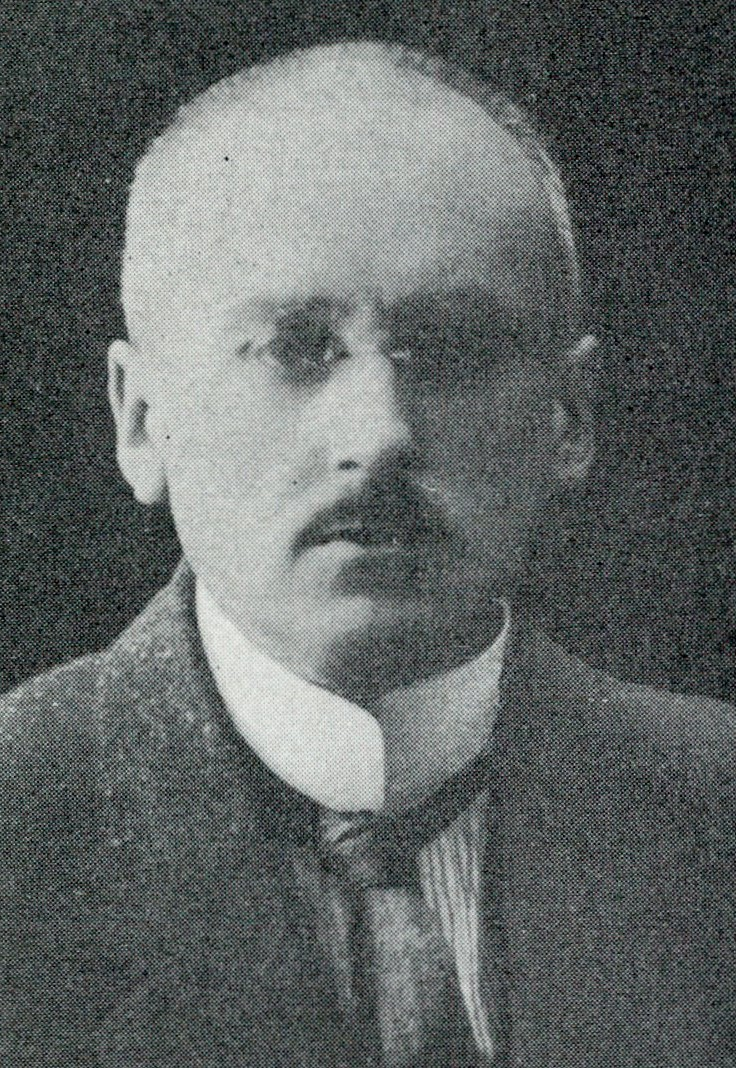
Image of Leo Hildén

Erik Leopold (Leo) Hildén (26 July 1876 – 31 March 1945) was a Finnish engineer and politician, born in Oulu. He was a member of the Parliament of Finland from 1919 to 1922, representing the Social Democratic Party of Finland (SDP).
