= Yrjö Kivenoja =

Finnish Lutheran clergyman and politician

Yrjö Efraim Kivenoja (25 May 1880, in Kuopio – 3 July 1948; original surname Stenius) was a Finnish Lutheran clergyman and politician. At first a member of the National Coalition Party, he later joined the Patriotic People's Movement (IKL), which he represented in the Parliament of Finland from 1933 to 1936.
