= Frans Hanhisalo =

Finnish politician

Frans Herman Hanhisalo (11 May 1893, in Lohtaja – 30 May 1935) was a Finnish farmer, temperance movement activist and politician. He was a member of the Parliament of Finland from 1919 to 1921, representing the Agrarian League.
