= Aleksis Salovaara =

Finnish schoolteacher, farmer and politician (1866–1925)

Aleksander (Aleksis) Salovaara (29 April 1866 – 17 June 1925) was a Finnish schoolteacher, farmer and politician, born in Sortavala. He was a member of the Parliament of Finland from 1916 to 1919, representing the Agrarian League.
