= Kalle Nurmela =

Finnish land surveyor, farmer and politician (1882–1941)

Kalle Nurmela (15 January 1882 – 27 August 1941) was a Finnish land surveyor, farmer and politician, born in Pudasjärvi. He was a member of the Parliament of Finland from 1913 to 1919, representing the Agrarian League.
