= Otto Muikku =

Finnish politician

Otto Evert Muikku (7 July 1901 – 17 May 1963) was a Finnish politician, born in Pielisjärvi. He was a Member of the Parliament of Finland from 1945 to 1958, representing the Social Democratic Party of Finland (SDP).
