= Oskar Schultz =

Finnish politician

Oskar Alexander Napoleon Schultz (16 September 1855, in Padasjoki – 10 March 1919) was a Finnish engineer, civil servant and politician. He was a member of the Parliament of Finland from 1907 to 1908, representing the Swedish People's Party of Finland (SFP).
