= Pekka Kiiski =

Finnish farmer, journalist and politician (1897–1976)

Pekka Kiiski (30 August 1897 – 11 July 1976) was a Finnish farmer, journalist and politician, born in Kurkijoki. He was a member of the Parliament of Finland from 1948 to 1951, representing the Agrarian League.
