= Pekka Tanskanen =

Finnish farmer and politician (1866–1946)

Pekka Tanskanen (26 May 1866 – 11 March 1946) was a Finnish farmer and politician, born in Juuka. He was a member of the Parliament of Finland from 1917 to 1919, representing the Agrarian League (ML).
