= Aatami Asikainen =

Finnish farmer, cooperative organizer and politician (1891–1965)

Aatami (Adam) Asikainen (15 April 1891 – 6 March 1965) was a Finnish farmer, cooperative organizer and politician, born in Kuopio. He was a member of the Parliament of Finland from 1924 to 1929, representing the Socialist Electoral Organisation of Workers and Smallholders.
