= Emanuel Kolkki =

Finnish politician

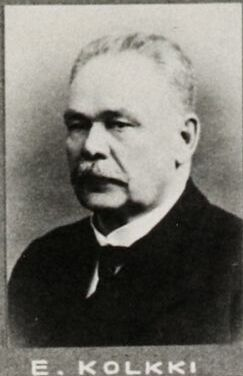
Emanuel Kolkki in the early 1930s

Emanuel Kolkki (22 November 1869, Kuru – 17 March 1940) was a Finnish Lutheran clergyman and politician. He was a member of the Parliament of Finland, representing the Finnish Party from 1907 to 1909 and the National Coalition Party from 1930 to 1933.
