= Yrjö Kiuru =

Finnish politician

Yrjö Kiuru (25 July 1872, Antrea – 1 December 1945) was a Finnish farmer, schoolteacher, lay preacher and politician. He was a Member of the Parliament of Finland from 1911 to 1916, representing the Agrarian League.
