= Arvo Pohjannoro =

Finnish politician (1893–1963)

Frans Arvo Ilmari Pohjannoro (18 November 1893, in Tampere – 10 October 1963; surname until 1906 Floor) was a Finnish Lutheran clergyman and politician. He was a member of the Parliament of Finland from 1936 to 1948, representing the National Coalition Party. In 1918, he served in the Finnish Civil War on the White side as the military chaplain of the 2nd Grenadier Regiment.
