= Kaarlo Holma =

Finnish lawyer and politician (1883–1949)

Karl (Kaarlo) Viktor Holma (16 April 1883 – 25 October 1949; surname until 1906 Hellman) was a Finnish lawyer and politician, born in Hämeenlinna. He was a member of the Parliament of Finland from 1919 to 1922, representing the National Coalition Party.
