= Arthur von Weissenberg =

Finnish politician

Arthur Emil von Weissenberg (25 January 1863, Viipuri – 15 February 1945) was a Finnish jurist and politician. He was a Member of the Diet of Finland and a Member of the Parliament of Finland from 1913 to 1916.
