= Ari Pitkänen =

Finnish journalist, writer and politician (1876–1938)

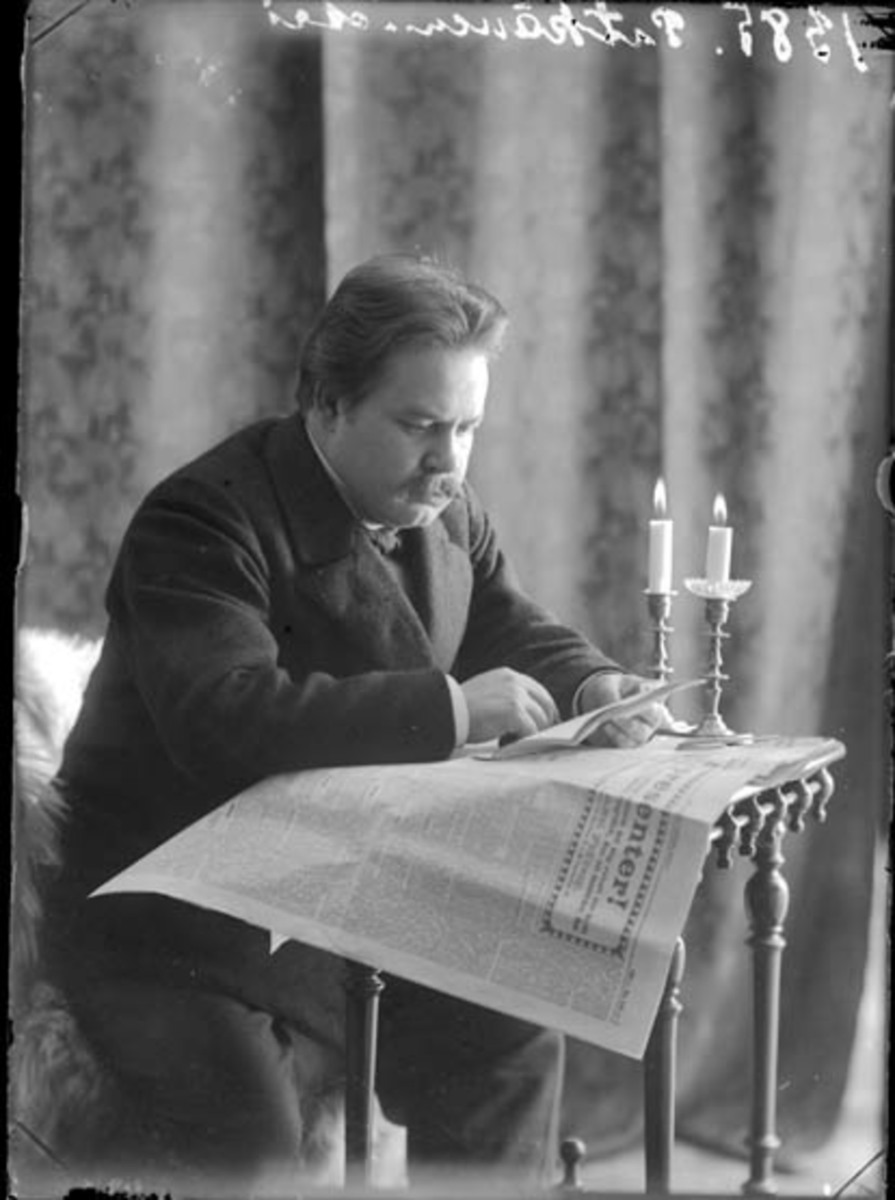
Ari Pitkänen in 1901

Aron (Ari) Pitkänen (20 June 1876 – 15 January 1938) was a Finnish journalist, writer and politician, born in Kuopio. He was a member of the Parliament of Finland from 1919 to 1922, representing the Agrarian League.
