= Lauri Kaukamaa =

Finnish politician (1907–1990)

Lauri Iivari Kaukamaa (22 August 1907 - 20 April 1990; surname until 1929 Munter) was a Finnish educationist, civil servant and politician, born in Pori. He was a member of the Parliament of Finland from 1948 to 1951, representing the National Coalition Party.
