= Kaarlo Anttila =

Finnish politician (1874–1962)

Kaarlo Santeri Anttila
- Born: 12 February 1874; Kurikka
- Died: 1 July 1962 (aged 88)
- Occupation: Farmer Merchant Politician

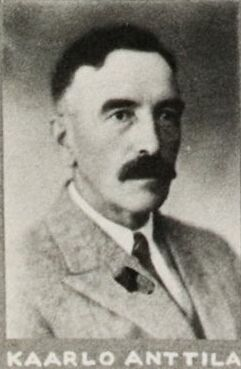
Kaarlo Anttila, 1930

Kaarlo Santeri Anttila (12 February 1874 – 1 July 1962) was a Finnish farmer, merchant and politician, born in Kurikka. He served as a Member of the Parliament of Finland from 1930 to 1933, representing the National Coalition Party.
