= Jussi Tirkkonen =

Finnish politician

Jussi Tirkkonen (24 June 1883, Kaavi – 14 April 1934) was a Finnish tailor and politician. He was a Member of the Parliament of Finland from 1916 to 1918, representing the Social Democratic Party of Finland (SDP).
