= Oskari Peurakoski =

Finnish forester and politician (1869–1944)

Johan Oskar (Juhana Oskari) Peurakoski (13 August 1869 – 17 October 1944; surname until 1905 Renfors) was a Finnish forester and politician, born in Pori. He was a member of the Parliament of Finland from 1909 to 1919, representing the Finnish Party until December 1918 and the National Coalition Party after that.
