= Karl Ottelin =

Finnish jurist and politician (1865–1930)

Karl Eino Ottelin (29 August 1865 – 4 June 1930) was a Finnish jurist and politician, born in Kauhajoki. He was a member of the Parliament of Finland from 1917 to 1919, representing the Swedish People's Party of Finland.
