= Kaarlo Salovaara =

Finnish Lutheran clergyman and politician

Karl Fredrik Salovaara
- Born: Karl Fredrik Lundahl; July 20, 1874; Hämeenlinna, Grand Duchy of Finland
- Died: January 4, 1956 (aged 81)
- Occupations: Lutheran clergyman, politician
- Known for: Member of the Parliament of Finland (1936–1939)
- Political party: Patriotic People's Movement (IKL)

Karl (Kaarlo) Fredrik Salovaara (20 July 1874 – 4 January 1956; surname until 1896 Lundahl) was a Finnish Lutheran clergyman and politician. He was a member of the Parliament of Finland from 1936 to 1939, representing the Patriotic People's Movement (IKL).
