= Taavi Rissanen =

Finnish politician

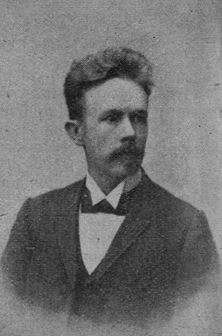
Image of Taavi Rissanen

Taavi Rissanen (7 October 1864, Kuopion maalaiskunta – 29 June 1934) was a Finnish schoolteacher and politician. He served as a Member of the Parliament of Finland from 1907 to 1908, representing the Social Democratic Party of Finland (SDP).
