= Satakunta (parliamentary electoral district) =

Electoral district of the Parliament of Finland

- Electoral District for the Parliament of Finland
- Location of Satakunta within Finland
- Municipality: List: Eura; Eurajoki; Harjavalta; Huittinen; Jämijärvi; Kankaanpää; Karvia; Kokemäki; Merikarvia; Nakkila; Pomarkku; Pori; Rauma; Säkylä; Siikainen; Ulvila
- Region: Satakunta
- Population: 212,653 (2022)
- Electorate: 176,653 (2023)
- Area: 8,269 km^{2} (2022)

Current Electoral District
- Created: 1907
- Seats: List: 8 (2015–present); 9 (2003–2015); 10 (1999–2003); 11 (1995–1999)); 12 (1987–1995); 13 (1966–1987); 14 (1954–1966); 15 (1951–1954); 13 (1948–1951); 14 (1939–1948); 15 (1917–1939); 17 (1907–1917)
- Members of Parliament: List: Laura Huhtasaari (PS); Petri Huru (PS); Eeva Kalli (Kesk); Mari Kaunistola (Kok); Krista Kiuru (SDP); Jari Koskela (PS); Matias Marttinen (Kok); Juha Viitala (SDP)

Satakunta is one of the 13 electoral districts of the Parliament of Finland, the national legislature of Finland. The district was established as Turku Province North (Finnish: Turun läänin pohjoinen vaalipiiri; Swedish: Åbo läns norra valkrets) in 1907 when the Diet of Finland was replaced by the Parliament of Finland. It was renamed Satakunta in 1997. It is conterminous with the region of Satakunta. The district currently elects eight of the 200 members of the Parliament of Finland using the open party-list proportional representation electoral system. At the 2023 parliamentary election it had 176,653 registered electors.

== History ==
Turku and Pori Province North was one 16 electoral districts established by the Election Act of the Grand Duchy of Finland (Suomen Suuriruhtinaanmaan Vaalilaki) passed by the Diet of Finland in 1906. It consisted of the hundreds (kihlakunta) of Ikaalinen, Loimaa, Tyrvää and Ulvila in the province of Turku and Pori. The town of Loimaa and the municipalities of Alastaro, Loimaa, Mellilä and Metsämaa were transferred from Turku Province North to Turku Province South in 1947. The municipalities of Hämeenkyrö, Ikaalinen, Kihniö, Mouhijärvi, Parkano and Viljakkala were transferred from Turku Province North to Häme Province North in 1993. The district was renamed Satakunta in 1997.

The municipalities of Äetsä, Suodenniemi and Vammala were transferred from Satakunta to Pirkanmaa in 1998. At the same time, Kodisjoki municipality was transferred from Varsinais-Suomi to Satakunta and Urjala municipality was transferred from Häme to Satakunta. Punkalaidun municipality was transferred from Satakunta to Pirkanmaa in 2005.

== Electoral system ==
Satakunta currently elects eight of the 200 members of the Parliament of Finland using the open party-list proportional representation electoral system. Parties may form electoral alliances with each other to pool their votes and increase their chances of winning seats. However, the number of candidates nominated by an electoral alliance may not exceed the maximum number of candidates that a single party may nominate. Seats are allocated using the D'Hondt method.

== Election results ==
=== Summary ===
Election	Left Alliance Vas / SKDL / STPV / SSTP			Green League Vihr			Social Democrats SDP / SDTP / SDP			Swedish People's SFP			Centre Kesk / ML			Liberals Lib / LKP / SK / KE / NP			National Coalition Kok / SP			Christian Democrats KD / SKL			Finns PS / SMP / SPP		
Election	Votes	%	Seats	Votes	%	Seats	Votes	%	Seats	Votes	%	Seats	Votes	%	Seats	Votes	%	Seats	Votes	%	Seats	Votes	%	Seats	Votes	%	Seats
2023	9,903	8.28%	0	3,235	2.70%	0	29,427	24.60%	2	417	0.35%	0	16,637	13.91%	1				20,381	17.04%	2	3,838	3.21%	0	31,875	26.65%	3
2019	12,435	9.96%	1	7,461	5.97%	0	31,475	25.21%	3	178	0.14%	0	20,878	16.72%	1				17,666	14.15%	1	3,361	2.69%	0	30,090	24.10%	2
2015	11,730	9.59%	1	3,335	2.73%	0	27,631	22.59%	2	426	0.35%	0	25,247	20.64%	2				18,377	15.02%	1	3,525	2.88%	0	30,600	25.01%	2
2011	13,778	10.93%	1	4,835	3.83%	0	30,312	24.04%	2				20,310	16.11%	1				22,155	17.57%	2	4,306	3.41%	1	29,816	23.64%	2
2007	14,815	12.05%	1	4,292	3.49%	0	36,232	29.46%	3				30,377	24.70%	3				26,395	21.46%	2	2,977	2.42%	0	6,392	5.20%	0
2003	19,330	14.97%	1	4,492	3.48%	0	38,369	29.72%	3				36,238	28.07%	3	165	0.13%	0	21,662	16.78%	2	5,908	4.58%	0	1,926	1.49%	0
1999	21,613	15.37%	2	4,587	3.26%	0	39,225	27.90%	3				33,329	23.70%	2				31,019	22.06%	2	6,785	4.83%	1	915	0.65%	0
1995	22,430	14.60%	2	4,801	3.13%	0	50,931	33.16%	4				32,148	20.93%	3	1,010	0.66%	0	29,077	18.93%	2	5,257	3.42%	0	3,352	2.18%	0
1991	23,665	13.72%	2	7,438	4.31%	0	45,950	26.64%	3				41,539	24.09%	3	443	0.26%	0	34,547	20.03%	2	5,108	2.96%	1	11,341	6.58%	1
1987	25,954	13.99%	2	5,262	2.84%	0	47,982	25.85%	4				30,773	16.58%	2	1,030	0.56%	0	46,166	24.88%	3	3,626	1.95%	0	15,946	8.59%	1
1983	33,502	17.18%	2				55,151	28.29%	4				32,476	16.66%	2				44,608	22.88%	3	5,927	3.04%	0	22,886	11.74%	2
1979	39,339	20.64%	3				48,472	25.43%	3				34,269	17.98%	2	7,397	3.88%	1	39,767	20.86%	3	8,709	4.57%	0	11,623	6.10%	1
1975	40,373	22.30%	3				47,247	26.10%	4				34,029	18.80%	2	7,753	4.28%	1	34,466	19.04%	3	5,189	2.87%	0	7,045	3.89%	0
1972	34,687	20.10%	3				48,353	28.02%	4				32,585	18.88%	3	4,594	2.66%	0	31,331	18.16%	2	4,516	2.62%	0	15,715	9.11%	1
1970	34,256	20.04%	3				44,617	26.10%	4				33,430	19.55%	2	5,834	3.41%	1	30,946	18.10%	2	1,673	0.98%	0	19,517	11.42%	1
1966	39,625	24.36%	3				47,645	29.29%	4				39,742	24.43%	3	5,376	3.30%	1	25,922	15.93%	2	1,339	0.82%	0	1,378	0.85%	0
1962	40,361	24.93%	4				33,968	20.98%	3				43,906	27.12%	4	4,469	2.76%	0	29,835	18.43%	3				3,241	2.00%	0
1958	35,284	25.74%	4				36,052	26.30%	4				34,839	25.41%	3	3,029	2.21%	0	27,894	20.34%	3						
1954	35,391	24.29%	3				40,371	27.71%	4				37,914	26.03%	4	7,808	5.36%	0	24,086	16.53%	3						
1951	31,630	23.73%	4				38,969	29.24%	4				32,665	24.51%	4	4,944	3.71%	0	25,040	18.79%	3						
1948	28,531	22.60%	3				37,524	29.73%	4				31,177	24.70%	3	2,367	1.88%	0	25,595	20.28%	3						
1945	35,592	28.76%	4				34,578	27.94%	4				23,659	19.12%	3	3,093	2.50%	1	23,423	18.93%	2						
1939							43,713	47.40%	7				18,517	20.08%	3	1,773	1.92%	0	18,597	20.16%	3						
1936							40,813	47.98%	8				15,866	18.65%	3	2,438	2.87%	0	12,872	15.13%	3						
1933							37,335	46.28%	8				15,250	18.90%	3	3,433	4.26%	0	19,779	24.52%	4						
1930							32,728	40.68%	6				21,089	26.21%	4	3,531	4.39%	0	20,236	25.15%	5						
1929	7,832	11.37%	2				25,448	36.94%	6				17,653	25.62%	4	2,804	4.07%	0	12,753	18.51%	3						
1927	6,793	10.16%	1				26,247	39.24%	6				13,759	20.57%	3	3,905	5.84%	1	16,121	24.10%	4						
1924	5,994	9.33%	1				25,023	38.94%	6				11,035	17.17%	3	4,642	7.22%	1	17,514	27.25%	4						
1922	7,713	12.61%	2				21,860	35.75%	6				9,775	15.99%	2	4,559	7.46%	1	17,199	28.13%	4						
1919							31,735	45.94%	7				7,181	10.40%	1	8,160	11.81%	2	19,995	28.94%	4						
1917							45,174	57.47%	9										31,418	39.97%	6						
1916							42,601	64.49%	12							6,937	10.50%	2	13,781	20.86%	3						
1913							35,939	58.38%	10							7,045	11.44%	2	16,366	26.59%	5						
1911							38,060	57.11%	10							8,120	12.18%	2	17,364	26.06%	5						
1910							37,435	56.60%	10							7,542	11.40%	2	17,790	26.90%	5						
1909							38,735	54.65%	9							8,171	11.53%	2	19,596	27.65%	5						
1908							38,080	54.62%	9							7,813	11.21%	2	19,303	27.68%	5						
1907							41,705	54.84%	10	234	0.31%	0				7,557	9.94%	1	20,598	27.09%	5						

(Figures in italics represent joint lists.)

=== Detailed ===
==== 2020s ====
===== 2023 =====
Results of the 2023 parliamentary election held on 2 April 2023:

Party		Party			Electoral Alliance		
Party		Votes	%	Seats	Votes	%	Seats
Finns Party	PS	31,875	26.65%	3	31,875	26.65%	3
Social Democratic Party of Finland	SDP	29,427	24.60%	2	29,427	24.60%	2
National Coalition Party	Kok	20,381	17.04%	2	20,381	17.04%	2
Centre Party	Kesk	16,637	13.91%	1	16,637	13.91%	1
Left Alliance	Vas	9,903	8.28%	0	9,903	8.28%	0
Christian Democrats	KD	3,838	3.21%	0	3,838	3.21%	0
Green League	Vihr	3,235	2.70%	0	3,235	2.70%	0
Movement Now	Liik	2,098	1.75%	0	2,098	1.75%	0
Freedom Alliance	VL	1,452	1.21%	0	1,492	1.25%	0
Finnish People First	SKE	40	0.03%	0	1,492	1.25%	0
Swedish People's Party of Finland	SFP	417	0.35%	0	417	0.35%	0
Power Belongs to the People	VKK	246	0.21%	0	246	0.21%	0
Pirate Party	Pir	62	0.05%	0	62	0.05%	0
Valid votes		119,611	100.00%	8	119,611	100.00%	8
Rejected votes		523	0.44%				
Total polled		120,134	68.01%				
Registered electors		176,653					

The following candidates were elected: Laura Huhtasaari (PS), 8,393 votes; Petri Huru (PS), 6,208 votes; Eeva Kalli (Kesk), 7,930 votes; Mari Kaunistola (Kok), 3,030 votes; Krista Kiuru (SDP), 7,861 votes; Jari Koskela (PS), 5,213 votes; Matias Marttinen (Kok), 7,618 votes; and Juha Viitala (SDP), 4,238 votes.

==== 2010s ====
===== 2019 =====
Results of the 2019 parliamentary election held on 14 April 2019:

Party		Party			Electoral Alliance		
Party		Votes	%	Seats	Votes	%	Seats
Social Democratic Party of Finland	SDP	31,475	25.21%	3	31,475	25.21%	3
Finns Party	PS	30,090	24.10%	2	30,090	24.10%	2
Centre Party	Kesk	20,878	16.72%	1	20,878	16.72%	1
National Coalition Party	Kok	17,666	14.15%	1	17,844	14.29%	1
Swedish People's Party of Finland	SFP	178	0.14%	0	17,844	14.29%	1
Left Alliance	Vas	12,435	9.96%	1	12,435	9.96%	1
Green League	Vihr	7,461	5.97%	0	7,461	5.97%	0
Christian Democrats	KD	3,361	2.69%	0	3,361	2.69%	0
Maarit Markkula (Independent)		452	0.36%	0	452	0.36%	0
Pirate Party	Pir	253	0.20%	0	253	0.20%	0
Seven Star Movement	TL	199	0.16%	0	199	0.16%	0
Communist Party of Finland	SKP	187	0.15%	0	187	0.15%	0
Feminist Party	FP	131	0.10%	0	131	0.10%	0
Communist Workers' Party – For Peace and Socialism	KTP	84	0.07%	0	84	0.07%	0
Olavi Koskela (Independent)		21	0.02%	0	21	0.02%	0
Valid votes		124,871	100.00%	8	124,871	100.00%	8
Rejected votes		635	0.51%				
Total polled		125,506	69.25%				
Registered electors		181,239					

The following candidates were elected: Laura Huhtasaari (PS), 12,991 votes; Eeva Kalli (Kesk), 6,717 votes; Krista Kiuru (SDP), 8,281 votes; Jari Koskela (PS), 4,324 votes; Matias Marttinen (Kok), 4,925 votes; Jari Myllykoski (Vas), 4,001 votes; Kristiina Salonen (SDP), 10,430 votes; and Heidi Viljanen (SDP), 2,169 votes.

===== 2015 =====
Results of the 2015 parliamentary election held on 19 April 2015:

Party		Votes	%	Seats
True Finns	PS	30,600	25.01%	2
Social Democratic Party of Finland	SDP	27,631	22.59%	2
Centre Party	Kesk	25,247	20.64%	2
National Coalition Party	Kok	18,377	15.02%	1
Left Alliance	Vas	11,730	9.59%	1
Christian Democrats	KD	3,525	2.88%	0
Green League	Vihr	3,335	2.73%	0
Independence Party	IPU	436	0.36%	0
Swedish People's Party of Finland	SFP	426	0.35%	0
Change 2011		393	0.32%	0
Pirate Party	Pir	388	0.32%	0
Communist Party of Finland	SKP	127	0.10%	0
Communist Workers' Party – For Peace and Socialism	KTP	80	0.07%	0
Workers' Party of Finland	STP	39	0.03%	0
Valid votes		122,334	100.00%	8
Rejected votes		672	0.55%	
Total polled		123,006	66.20%	
Registered electors		185,799		

The following candidates were elected: Laura Huhtasaari (PS), 9,259 votes; Ari Jalonen (PS), 5,753 votes; Kauko Juhantalo (Kesk), 4,627 votes; Timo Kalli (Kesk), 4,215 votes; Krista Kiuru (SDP), 7,561 votes; Jaana Laitinen-Pesola (Kok), 3,483 votes; Jari Myllykoski (Vas), 4,175 votes; and Kristiina Salonen (SDP), 9,560 votes.

===== 2011 =====
Results of the 2011 parliamentary election held on 17 April 2011:

Party		Party			Electoral Alliance		
Party		Votes	%	Seats	Votes	%	Seats
Social Democratic Party of Finland	SDP	30,312	24.04%	2	30,312	24.04%	2
True Finns	PS	29,816	23.64%	2	29,816	23.64%	2
Centre Party	Kesk	20,310	16.11%	1	24,616	19.52%	2
Christian Democrats	KD	4,306	3.41%	1	24,616	19.52%	2
National Coalition Party	Kok	22,155	17.57%	2	22,155	17.57%	2
Left Alliance	Vas	13,778	10.93%	1	13,778	10.93%	1
Green League	Vihr	4,835	3.83%	0	4,835	3.83%	0
Independence Party	IPU	168	0.13%	0	168	0.13%	0
Change 2011		159	0.13%	0	159	0.13%	0
Communist Party of Finland	SKP	129	0.10%	0	129	0.10%	0
Communist Workers' Party – For Peace and Socialism	KTP	63	0.05%	0	63	0.05%	0
Freedom Party – Finland's Future	VP	42	0.03%	0	42	0.03%	0
Workers' Party of Finland	STP	35	0.03%	0	35	0.03%	0
Valid votes		126,108	100.00%	9	126,108	100.00%	9
Rejected votes		703	0.55%				
Total polled		126,811	67.40%				
Registered electors		188,146					

The following candidates were elected: Sauli Ahvenjärvi (KD), 3,880 votes; Anne Holmlund (Kok), 3,952 votes; Ari Jalonen (PS), 6,721 votes; Anssi Joutsenlahti (PS), 6,583 votes; Timo Kalli (Kesk), 5,163 votes; Sampsa Kataja (Kok), 6,425 votes; Krista Kiuru (SDP), 7,786 votes; Jari Myllykoski (Vas), 3,321 votes; and Kristiina Salonen (SDP), 7,124 votes.

==== 2000s ====
===== 2007 =====
Results of the 2007 parliamentary election held on 18 March 2007:

Party		Party			Electoral Alliance		
Party		Votes	%	Seats	Votes	%	Seats
Social Democratic Party of Finland	SDP	36,232	29.46%	3	36,232	29.46%	3
Centre Party	Kesk	30,377	24.70%	3	30,377	24.70%	3
National Coalition Party	Kok	26,395	21.46%	2	26,395	21.46%	2
Left Alliance	Vas	14,815	12.05%	1	14,815	12.05%	1
True Finns	PS	6,392	5.20%	0	9,579	7.79%	0
Christian Democrats	KD	2,977	2.42%	0	9,579	7.79%	0
Independence Party	IPU	210	0.17%	0	9,579	7.79%	0
Green League	Vihr	4,292	3.49%	0	4,292	3.49%	0
Pensioners for People		737	0.60%	0	737	0.60%	0
Communist Party of Finland	SKP	357	0.29%	0	357	0.29%	0
Finnish People's Blue-Whites	SKS	84	0.07%	0	84	0.07%	0
Communist Workers' Party – For Peace and Socialism	KTP	61	0.05%	0	61	0.05%	0
Workers' Party of Finland	STP	46	0.04%	0	46	0.04%	0
Valid votes		122,975	100.00%	9	122,975	100.00%	9
Rejected votes		823	0.66%				
Total polled		123,798	65.55%				
Registered electors		188,854					

The following candidates were elected: Anne Holmlund (Kok), 3,896 votes; Timo Kalli (Kesk), 5,836 votes; Reijo Kallio (SDP), 5,400 votes; Oiva Kaltiokumpu (Kesk), 5,611 votes; Sampsa Kataja (Kok), 8,463 votes; Krista Kiuru (SDP), 5,560 votes; Juha Korkeaoja (Kesk), 5,316 votes; Veijo Puhjo (Vas), 3,271 votes; and Antti Vuolanne (SDP), 5,182 votes.

===== 2003 =====
Results of the 2003 parliamentary election held on 16 March 2003:

Party		Party			Electoral Alliance		
Party		Votes	%	Seats	Votes	%	Seats
Social Democratic Party of Finland	SDP	38,369	29.72%	3	38,369	29.72%	3
Centre Party	Kesk	36,238	28.07%	3	36,238	28.07%	3
National Coalition Party	Kok	21,662	16.78%	2	21,662	16.78%	2
Left Alliance	Vas	19,330	14.97%	1	19,330	14.97%	1
Christian Democrats	KD	5,908	4.58%	0	8,203	6.35%	0
True Finns	PS	1,926	1.49%	0	8,203	6.35%	0
Pensioners for People		204	0.16%	0	8,203	6.35%	0
Liberals	Lib	165	0.13%	0	8,203	6.35%	0
Green League	Vihr	4,492	3.48%	0	4,492	3.48%	0
Forces for Change in Finland		407	0.32%	0	407	0.32%	0
Communist Party of Finland	SKP	280	0.22%	0	280	0.22%	0
Communist Workers' Party – For Peace and Socialism	KTP	106	0.08%	0	106	0.08%	0
Valid votes		129,087	100.00%	9	129,087	100.00%	9
Rejected votes		1,166	0.90%				
Total polled		130,253	67.58%				
Registered electors		192,731					

The following candidates were elected: Mikko Elo (SDP), 4,893 votes; Anne Holmlund (Kok), 3,701 votes; Kauko Juhantalo (Kesk), 8,484 votes; Timo Kalli (Kesk), 5,417 votes; Reijo Kallio (SDP), 6,283 votes; Juha Korkeaoja (Kesk), 5,820 votes; Kalevi Lamminen (Kok), 3,390 votes; Pirkko Peltomo (SDP), 6,736 votes; and Veijo Puhjo (Vas), 5,687 votes.

==== 1990s ====
===== 1999 =====
Results of the 1999 parliamentary election held on 21 March 1999:

Party		Party			Electoral Alliance		
Party		Votes	%	Seats	Votes	%	Seats
Centre Party	Kesk	33,329	23.70%	2	40,114	28.53%	3
Finnish Christian League	SKL	6,785	4.83%	1	40,114	28.53%	3
Social Democratic Party of Finland	SDP	39,225	27.90%	3	39,225	27.90%	3
National Coalition Party	Kok	31,019	22.06%	2	31,019	22.06%	2
Left Alliance	Vas	21,613	15.37%	2	26,200	18.63%	2
Green League	Vihr	4,587	3.26%	0	26,200	18.63%	2
True Finns	PS	915	0.65%	0	1,988	1.41%	0
Reform Group	Rem	885	0.63%	0	1,988	1.41%	0
Alliance for Free Finland	VSL	188	0.13%	0	1,988	1.41%	0
Communist Party of Finland	SKP	559	0.40%	0	813	0.58%	0
Kirjava ”Puolue” – Elonkehän Puolesta	KIPU	141	0.10%	0	813	0.58%	0
Communist Workers' Party – For Peace and Socialism	KTP	113	0.08%	0	813	0.58%	0
Finland: Non-EU Joint List		693	0.49%	0	693	0.49%	0
Natural Law Party	LLP	349	0.25%	0	349	0.25%	0
Ari A. Heljakka (Independent)		110	0.08%	0	110	0.08%	0
Matti Tingander (Independent)		63	0.04%	0	63	0.04%	0
Olavi Koskela (Independent)		39	0.03%	0	39	0.03%	0
Valid votes		140,613	100.00%	10	140,613	100.00%	10
Rejected votes		1,623	1.14%				
Total polled		142,236	67.04%				
Registered electors		212,169					

The following candidates were elected: Mikko Elo (SDP), 8,268 votes; Olli-Pekka Heinonen (Kok), 11,697 votes; Leea Hiltunen (SKL), 4,697 votes; Timo Kalli (Kesk), 5,707 votes; Reijo Kallio (SDP), 7,128 votes; Juha Korkeaoja (Kesk), 6,588 votes; Jouni Lehtimäki (Kok), 4,117 votes; Pirkko Peltomo (SDP), 6,240 votes; Veijo Puhjo (Vas), 8,084 votes; and Katja Syvärinen (Vas), 4,423 votes.

===== 1995 =====
Results of the 1995 parliamentary election held on 19 March 1995:

Party		Party			Electoral Alliance		
Party		Votes	%	Seats	Votes	%	Seats
Social Democratic Party of Finland	SDP	50,931	33.16%	4	50,931	33.16%	4
Centre Party	Kesk	32,148	20.93%	3	32,148	20.93%	3
National Coalition Party	Kok	29,077	18.93%	2	29,077	18.93%	2
Left Alliance	Vas	22,430	14.60%	2	22,430	14.60%	2
Finnish Christian League	SKL	5,257	3.42%	0	10,120	6.59%	0
Finnish Rural Party	SMP	3,352	2.18%	0	10,120	6.59%	0
Liberal People's Party	LKP	1,010	0.66%	0	10,120	6.59%	0
Women's Party	NAISP	239	0.16%	0	10,120	6.59%	0
Pensioners' Party	SEP	227	0.15%	0	10,120	6.59%	0
Ecological Party the Greens	EKO	35	0.02%	0	10,120	6.59%	0
Green League	Vihr	4,801	3.13%	0	4,801	3.13%	0
Other Joint List		1,818	1.18%	0	1,818	1.18%	0
Young Finns	Nuor	1,216	0.79%	0	1,216	0.79%	0
Alliance for Free Finland	VSL	673	0.44%	0	673	0.44%	0
Natural Law Party	LLP	239	0.16%	0	239	0.16%	0
Communist Workers' Party – For Peace and Socialism	KTP	127	0.08%	0	127	0.08%	0
Valid votes		153,580	100.00%	11	153,580	100.00%	11
Rejected votes		1,308	0.84%				
Total polled		154,888	71.75%				
Registered electors		215,861					

The following candidates were elected: Mikko Elo (SDP), 9,715 votes; Olli-Pekka Heinonen (Kok), 10,327 votes; Kauko Juhantalo (Kesk), 6,580 votes; Timo Kalli (Kesk), 5,086 votes; Reijo Kallio (SDP), 5,135 votes; Juha Korkeaoja (Kesk), 9,895 votes; Timo Laaksonen (Vas), 4,391 votes; Kalevi Lamminen (Kok), 4,515 votes; Pirkko Peltomo (SDP), 4,829 votes; Veijo Puhjo (Vas), 3,345 votes; and Heikki Rinne (SDP), 5,283 votes.

===== 1991 =====
Results of the 1991 parliamentary election held on 17 March 1991:

Party		Party			Electoral Alliance		
Party		Votes	%	Seats	Votes	%	Seats
Centre Party	Kesk	41,539	24.09%	3	46,647	27.05%	4
Finnish Christian League	SKL	5,108	2.96%	1	46,647	27.05%	4
Social Democratic Party of Finland	SDP	45,950	26.64%	3	45,950	26.64%	3
National Coalition Party	Kok	34,547	20.03%	2	34,547	20.03%	2
Left Alliance	Vas	23,665	13.72%	2	23,665	13.72%	2
Finnish Rural Party	SMP	11,341	6.58%	1	13,065	7.58%	1
Pensioners' Party	SEP	1,281	0.74%	0	13,065	7.58%	1
Liberal People's Party	LKP	443	0.26%	0	13,065	7.58%	1
Green League	Vihr	7,438	4.31%	0	7,438	4.31%	0
Independent Non-Aligned Pensioners	ELKA	501	0.29%	0	501	0.29%	0
Women's Party	NAISL	367	0.21%	0	367	0.21%	0
Communist Workers' Party – For Peace and Socialism	KTP	163	0.09%	0	163	0.09%	0
Humanity Party		122	0.07%	0	122	0.07%	0
Valid votes		172,465	100.00%	12	172,465	100.00%	12
Blank votes		1,386	0.79%				
Rejected Votess – Other		1,523	0.87%				
Total polled		175,374	71.71%				

The following candidates were elected: Raila Aho (Vas), 3,756 votes; Leea Hiltunen (SKL), 5,108 votes; Kauko Juhantalo (Kesk), 8,984 votes; Timo Kalli (Kesk), 6,777 votes; Maunu Kohijoki (Kok), 5,473 votes; Juha Korkeaoja (Kesk), 4,892 votes; Timo Laaksonen (Vas), 6,236 votes; Kalevi Lamminen (Kok), 5,335 votes; Lea Mäkipää (SMP), 6,049 votes; Heikki Rinne (SDP), 7,646 votes; Timo Roos (SDP), 6,646 votes; and Raimo Vuoristo (SDP), 6,518 votes.

==== 1980s ====
===== 1987 =====
Results of the 1987 parliamentary election held on 15 and 16 March 1987:

Party		Party			Electoral Alliance		
Party		Votes	%	Seats	Votes	%	Seats
Social Democratic Party of Finland	SDP	47,982	25.85%	4	47,982	25.85%	4
National Coalition Party	Kok	46,166	24.88%	3	46,166	24.88%	3
Centre Party	Kesk	30,773	16.58%	2	35,429	19.09%	2
Finnish Christian League	SKL	3,626	1.95%	0	35,429	19.09%	2
Liberal People's Party	LKP	1,030	0.56%	0	35,429	19.09%	2
Finnish People's Democratic League	SKDL	25,954	13.99%	2	25,954	13.99%	2
Finnish Rural Party	SMP	15,946	8.59%	1	15,946	8.59%	1
Democratic Alternative	DEVA	6,004	3.24%	0	6,004	3.24%	0
Green League	Vihr	5,262	2.84%	0	5,262	2.84%	0
Pensioners' Party	SEP	2,840	1.53%	0	2,840	1.53%	0
Valid votes		185,583	100.00%	12	185,583	100.00%	12
Rejected votes		1,109	0.59%				
Total polled		186,692	75.58%				
Registered electors		247,028					

The following candidates were elected: Raila Aho (SKDL), 3,676 votes; Mikko Elo (SDP), 7,199 votes; Kauko Juhantalo (Kesk), 8,514 votes; Maunu Kohijoki (Kok), 7,600 votes; Timo Laaksonen (SKDL), 7,741 votes; Kalevi Lamminen (Kok), 4,952 votes; Lea Mäkipää (SMP), 5,808 votes; Einari Nieminen (Kesk), 6,160 votes; Aino Pohjanoksa (Kok), 6,084 votes; Heikki Rinne (SDP), 4,445 votes; Timo Roos (SDP), 6,371 votes; and Raimo Vuoristo (SDP), 6,301 votes.

===== 1983 =====
Results of the 1983 parliamentary election held on 20 and 21 March 1983:

Party		Votes	%	Seats
Social Democratic Party of Finland	SDP	55,151	28.29%	4
National Coalition Party	Kok	44,608	22.88%	3
Finnish People's Democratic League	SKDL	33,502	17.18%	2
Centre Party and Liberal People's Party	Kesk-LKP	32,476	16.66%	2
Finnish Rural Party	SMP	22,886	11.74%	2
Finnish Christian League	SKL	5,927	3.04%	0
Joint List A (Green League)		433	0.22%	0
Valid votes		194,983	100.00%	13
Rejected votes		1,068	0.54%	
Total polled		196,051	79.21%	
Registered electors		247,517		

The following candidates were elected: Mikko Elo (SDP), 7,692 votes; Aila Jokinen (Kok), 5,626 votes; Anssi Joutsenlahti (SMP), 16,210 votes; Kauko Juhantalo (Kesk-LKP), 5,970 votes; Matti Kuusio (SDP), 4,200 votes; Timo Laaksonen (SKDL), 8,198 votes; Lea Mäkipää (SMP), 1,621 votes; Einari Nieminen (Kesk-LKP), 7,083 votes; Toivo Topias Pohjala (Kok), 5,748 votes; Aino Pohjanoksa (Kok), 7,566 votes; Timo Roos (SDP), 4,337 votes; Irma Rosnell (SKDL), 5,682 votes; and Pirkko Työläjärvi (SDP), 16,734 votes.

==== 1970s ====
===== 1979 =====
Results of the 1979 parliamentary election held on 18 and 19 March 1979:

Party		Party			Electoral Alliance		
Party		Votes	%	Seats	Votes	%	Seats
Social Democratic Party of Finland	SDP	48,472	25.43%	3	48,472	25.43%	3
Centre Party	Kesk	34,269	17.98%	2	41,666	21.86%	3
Liberal People's Party	LKP	7,397	3.88%	1	41,666	21.86%	3
National Coalition Party	Kok	39,767	20.86%	3	39,767	20.86%	3
Finnish People's Democratic League	SKDL	39,339	20.64%	3	39,339	20.64%	3
Finnish Rural Party	SMP	11,623	6.10%	1	21,145	11.09%	1
Finnish Christian League	SKL	8,709	4.57%	0	21,145	11.09%	1
Constitutional People's Party	PKP	813	0.43%	0	21,145	11.09%	1
Finnish People's Unity Party	SKYP	214	0.11%	0	214	0.11%	0
Valid votes		190,603	100.00%	13	190,603	100.00%	13
Rejected votes		828	0.43%				
Total polled		191,431	78.72%				
Registered electors		243,185					

The following candidates were elected: Mikko Elo (SDP), 6,132 votes; Matti Järvenpää (SKDL), 5,582 votes; Aila Jokinen (Kok), 6,475 votes; Anssi Joutsenlahti (SMP), 9,885 votes; Kauko Juhantalo (Kesk), 6,580 votes; Aulis Juvela (SKDL), 6,377 votes; Anneli Kivitie (LKP), 7,170 votes; Einari Nieminen (Kesk), 7,197 votes; Matti Pelttari (Kok), 8,431 votes; Toivo Topias Pohjala (Kok), 5,836 votes; Irma Rosnell (SKDL), 7,778 votes; Pirkko Työläjärvi (SDP), 14,720 votes; and Pirkko Valtonen (SDP), 6,004 votes.

===== 1975 =====
Results of the 1975 parliamentary election held on 21 and 22 September 1975:

Party		Party			Electoral Alliance		
Party		Votes	%	Seats	Votes	%	Seats
Social Democratic Party of Finland	SDP	47,247	26.10%	4	47,247	26.10%	4
Centre Party	Kesk	34,029	18.80%	2	41,782	23.08%	3
Liberal People's Party	LKP	7,753	4.28%	1	41,782	23.08%	3
National Coalition Party	Kok	34,466	19.04%	3	41,688	23.03%	3
Finnish Christian League	SKL	5,189	2.87%	0	41,688	23.03%	3
Finnish People's Unity Party	SKYP	2,033	1.12%	0	41,688	23.03%	3
Finnish People's Democratic League	SKDL	40,373	22.30%	3	40,778	22.53%	3
Socialist Workers Party	STP	405	0.22%	0	40,778	22.53%	3
Finnish Rural Party	SMP	7,045	3.89%	0	8,261	4.56%	0
Party of Finnish Entrepreneurs	SYP	1,216	0.67%	0	8,261	4.56%	0
Finnish Constitutional People's Party	SPK	1,267	0.70%	0	1,267	0.70%	0
Valid votes		181,023	100.00%	13	181,023	100.00%	13
Rejected votes		1,316	0.72%				
Total polled		182,339	76.71%				
Registered electors		237,707					

The following candidates were elected: Saimi Ääri (Kesk), 6,946 votes; Kirsti Hollming (Kok), 6,605 votes; Matti Järvenpää (SKDL), 7,078 votes; Tuure Junnila (Kok), 6,356 votes; Aulis Juvela (SKDL), 6,610 votes; Anneli Kivitie (LKP), 7,753 votes; Matti Kuusio (SDP), 5,438 votes; Uljas Mäkelä (SDP), 6,476 votes; Einari Nieminen (Kesk), 6,336 votes; Toivo Topias Pohjala (Kok), 6,344 votes; Pentti Rajala (SDP), 5,791 votes; Irma Rosnell (SKDL), 10,397 votes; and Pirkko Työläjärvi (SDP), 9,043 votes.

===== 1972 =====
Results of the 1972 parliamentary election held on 2 and 3 January 1972:

Party		Party			Electoral Alliance		
Party		Votes	%	Seats	Votes	%	Seats
Social Democratic Party of Finland	SDP	48,353	28.02%	4	48,353	28.02%	4
Centre Party	Kesk	32,585	18.88%	3	37,179	21.54%	3
Liberal People's Party	LKP	4,594	2.66%	0	37,179	21.54%	3
Finnish People's Democratic League	SKDL	34,687	20.10%	3	35,478	20.56%	3
Social Democratic Union of Workers and Smallholders	TPSL	791	0.46%	0	35,478	20.56%	3
National Coalition Party	Kok	31,331	18.16%	2	31,331	18.16%	2
Finnish Rural Party	SMP	15,715	9.11%	1	15,715	9.11%	1
Finnish Christian League	SKL	4,516	2.62%	0	4,516	2.62%	0
Valid votes		172,572	100.00%	13	172,572	100.00%	13
Rejected votes		826	0.48%				
Total polled		173,398	83.77%				
Registered electors		206,990					

The following candidates were elected: Saimi Ääri (Kesk), 6,127 votes; Pentti Antila (SMP), 4,743 votes; Margit Eskman (SDP), 10,654 votes; Matti Järvenpää (SKDL), 5,574 votes; Tuure Junnila (Kok), 4,402 votes; Aulis Juvela (SKDL), 5,547 votes; Uljas Mäkelä (SDP), 6,734 votes; Einari Nieminen (Kesk), 5,765 votes; Irma Rosnell (SKDL), 10,306 votes; Aulis Sileäkangas (Kesk), 6,159 votes; Ilkka Suominen (Note: Ilkka Suominen (Kok) is not showing as elected at the 1972 parliamentary election in Suomen virallinen tilasto XXIX A:32: Kansanedustajain vaalit 1972 but Parliament of Finland website shows him to be a member for Turku North from 1970 to 1975.) (Kok), 9,052 votes; Pirkko Työläjärvi (SDP), 4,736 votes; and Väinö Vilponiemi (SDP), 8,191 votes.

===== 1970 =====
Results of the 1970 parliamentary election held on 15 and 16 March 1970:

Party		Party			Electoral Alliance		
Party		Votes	%	Seats	Votes	%	Seats
Social Democratic Party of Finland	SDP	44,617	26.10%	4	44,617	26.10%	4
National Coalition Party	Kok	30,946	18.10%	2	36,780	21.51%	3
Liberal People's Party	LKP	5,834	3.41%	1	36,780	21.51%	3
Finnish People's Democratic League	SKDL	34,256	20.04%	3	34,256	20.04%	3
Centre Party	Kesk	33,430	19.55%	2	33,430	19.55%	2
Finnish Rural Party	SMP	19,517	11.42%	1	19,517	11.42%	1
Finnish Christian League	SKL	1,673	0.98%	0	1,673	0.98%	0
Social Democratic Union of Workers and Smallholders	TPSL	703	0.41%	0	703	0.41%	0
Valid votes		170,976	100.00%	13	170,976	100.00%	13
Rejected votes		914	0.53%				
Total polled		171,890	84.39%				
Registered electors		203,684					

The following candidates were elected: Saimi Ääri (Kesk), 5,145 votes; Pentti Antila (SMP), 3,680 votes; Margit Eskman (SDP), 9,802 votes; Matti Järvenpää (SKDL), 4,542 votes; Tuure Junnila (Kok), 5,493 votes; Aulis Juvela (SKDL), 4,826 votes; Nestori Kaasalainen (Kesk), 6,023 votes; Eeles Landström (LKP), 5,123 votes; Uljas Mäkelä (SDP), 7,786 votes; Antti-Veikko Perheentupa (SDP), 5,951 votes; Irma Rosnell (SKDL), 6,747 votes; Ilkka Suominen (Kok), 8,377 votes; and Väinö Vilponiemi (SDP), 6,495 votes.

==== 1960s ====
===== 1966 =====
Results of the 1966 parliamentary election held on 20 and 21 March 1966:

Party		Party			Electoral Alliance		
Party		Votes	%	Seats	Votes	%	Seats
Social Democratic Party of Finland	SDP	47,645	29.29%	4	47,645	29.29%	4
Finnish People's Democratic League	SKDL	39,625	24.36%	3	41,082	25.25%	3
Social Democratic Union of Workers and Smallholders	TPSL	1,457	0.90%	0	41,082	25.25%	3
Centre Party	Kesk	39,742	24.43%	3	39,742	24.43%	3
National Coalition Party	Kok	25,922	15.93%	2	32,637	20.06%	3
Liberal People's Party	LKP	5,376	3.30%	1	32,637	20.06%	3
Finnish Christian League	SKL	1,339	0.82%	0	32,637	20.06%	3
Smallholders' Party of Finland	SPP	1,378	0.85%	0	1,553	0.95%	0
Christian Women of Western Finland		124	0.08%	0	1,553	0.95%	0
Keijo Usko Lausala (Independent)		29	0.02%	0	1,553	0.95%	0
Pentti Kauk Saarinen (Independent)		22	0.01%	0	1,553	0.95%	0
Write-in lists		16	0.01%	0	16	0.01%	0
Valid votes		162,675	100.00%	13	162,675	100.00%	13
Blank votes		128	0.08%				
Rejected Votess – Other		607	0.37%				
Total polled		163,410	86.87%				
Registered electors		188,114					

The following candidates were elected: Margit Eskman (SDP), 5,746 votes; Kelpo Gröndahl (SKDL), 4,988 votes; Tuure Junnila (Kok), 6,196 votes; Aulis Juvela (SKDL), 4,816 votes; Nestori Kaasalainen (Kesk), 7,065 votes; Eeles Landström (LKP), 4,061 votes; Uljas Mäkelä (SDP), 9,557 votes; Arvo Pentti (Kesk), 7,520 votes; Antti-Veikko Perheentupa (SDP), 6,409 votes; Matti Raipala (Kok), 4,195 votes; Irma Rosnell (SKDL), 7,588 votes; Aulis Sileäkangas (Kesk), 6,210 votes; and Väinö Vilponiemi (SDP), 9,220 votes.

===== 1962 =====
Results of the 1962 parliamentary election held on 4 and 5 February 1962:

Party		Party			Electoral Alliance		
Party		Votes	%	Seats	Votes	%	Seats
Agrarian Party	ML	43,906	27.12%	4	48,375	29.88%	4
People's Party of Finland	SK	4,469	2.76%	0	48,375	29.88%	4
Finnish People's Democratic League	SKDL	40,361	24.93%	4	40,361	24.93%	4
Social Democratic Party of Finland	SDP	33,968	20.98%	3	33,968	20.98%	3
National Coalition Party	Kok	29,835	18.43%	3	29,835	18.43%	3
Social Democratic Union of Workers and Smallholders	TPSL	6,114	3.78%	0	6,114	3.78%	0
Smallholders' Party of Finland	SPP	3,241	2.00%	0	3,241	2.00%	0
Write-in lists		1	0.00%	0	1	0.00%	0
Valid votes		161,895	100.00%	14	161,895	100.00%	14
Rejected votes		600	0.37%				
Total polled		162,495	87.08%				
Registered electors		186,595					

The following candidates were elected: Kelpo Gröndahl (SKDL), 5,476 votes; Einari Jaakkola (ML), 7,249 votes; Nestori Kaasalainen (ML), 5,729 votes; Olavi Lindblom (SDP), 4,718 votes; Juho Mäkelä (SKDL), 3,984 votes; Uljas Mäkelä (SDP), 3,998 votes; Arvo Pentti (ML), 5,420 votes; Matti Raipala (Note: Matti Raipala (Kok) is showing as elected from Häme North at the 1962 parliamentary election in Suomen virallinen tilasto XXIX A:28: Kansanedustajain vaalit 1962 but Parliament of Finland website shows him to be a member for Turku North from 1954 to 1970.) (Kok), 4,540 votes; Pertti Rapio (SKDL), 4,784 votes; Paavo Rautkallio (Kok), 4,112 votes; Irma Rosnell (SKDL), 8,807 votes; Erkki Ryömä (ML), 6,091 votes; Aapo Seppälä (Kok), 4,025 votes; and Väinö Vilponiemi (SDP), 3,699 votes.

==== 1950s ====
===== 1958 =====
Results of the 1958 parliamentary election held on 6 and 7 July 1958:

Party		Party			Electoral Alliance		
Party		Votes	%	Seats	Votes	%	Seats
Social Democratic Party of Finland	SDP	36,052	26.30%	4	36,052	26.30%	4
Finnish People's Democratic League	SKDL	35,284	25.74%	4	35,284	25.74%	4
Agrarian Party	ML	34,839	25.41%	3	34,839	25.41%	3
National Coalition Party	Kok	27,894	20.34%	3	30,923	22.55%	3
People's Party of Finland	SK	3,029	2.21%	0	30,923	22.55%	3
Write-in lists		7	0.01%	0	7	0.01%	0
Valid votes		137,105	100.00%	14	137,105	100.00%	14
Rejected votes		1,059	0.77%				
Total polled		138,164	76.23%				
Registered electors		181,235					

The following candidates were elected: Einari Jaakkola (ML), 5,152 votes; Tuure Junnila (Kok), 5,716 votes; Nestori Kaasalainen (ML), 3,917 votes; Olavi Lindblom (SDP), 4,255 votes; Pentti Niemi (SDP), 5,701 votes; Arvo Pentti (ML), 3,762 votes; Kyllikki Pohjala (Kok), 4,374 votes; Antto Prunnila (SKDL), 3,646 votes; Matti Raipala (Kok), 4,466 votes; Viljo Rantala (SDP), 4,093 votes; Pertti Rapio (SKDL), 4,234 votes; Irma Rosnell (SKDL), 5,908 votes; Mauri Ryömä (SKDL), 4,920 votes; and Arvo Sävelä (SDP), 4,681 votes.

===== 1954 =====
Results of the 1954 parliamentary election held on 7 and 8 March 1954:

Party		Party			Electoral Alliance		
Party		Votes	%	Seats	Votes	%	Seats
Social Democratic Party of Finland	SDP	40,371	27.71%	4	40,371	27.71%	4
Agrarian Party	ML	37,914	26.03%	4	37,914	26.03%	4
Finnish People's Democratic League	SKDL	35,391	24.29%	3	35,391	24.29%	3
National Coalition Party	Kok	24,086	16.53%	3	31,894	21.89%	3
People's Party of Finland	SK	7,808	5.36%	0	31,894	21.89%	3
Other List		89	0.06%	0	89	0.06%	0
Write-in lists		14	0.01%	0	14	0.01%	0
Valid votes		145,673	100.00%	14	145,673	100.00%	14
Rejected votes		1,090	0.74%				
Total polled		146,763	81.41%				
Registered electors		180,272					

The following candidates were elected: Laura Brander-Wallin (SDP); Eino Heikura (ML); Einari Jaakkola (ML); Tuure Junnila (Kok); Nestori Kaasalainen (ML); Olavi Lindblom (SDP); Lauri Murtomaa (ML); Kyllikki Pohjala (Kok); Matti Raipala (Kok); Viljo Rantala (SDP); Pertti Rapio (SKDL); Irma Rosnell (SKDL); Mauri Ryömä (SKDL); and Arvo Sävelä (SDP).

===== 1951 =====
Results of the 1951 parliamentary election held on 1 and 2 July 1951:

Party		Votes	%	Seats
Social Democratic Party of Finland	SDP	38,969	29.24%	4
Agrarian Party	ML	32,665	24.51%	4
Finnish People's Democratic League	SKDL	31,630	23.73%	4
National Coalition Party	Kok	25,040	18.79%	3
People's Party of Finland	SK	4,944	3.71%	0
Write-in lists		24	0.02%	0
Valid votes		133,272	100.00%	15
Rejected votes		957	0.71%	
Total polled		134,229	75.64%	
Registered electors		177,452		

The following candidates were elected: Laura Brander-Wallin (SDP); Eino Heikura (ML); Kalle Joukanen (ML); Tuure Junnila (Kok); Nestori Kaasalainen (ML); Lauri Murtomaa (ML); Pentti Niemi (SDP); Hugo Nuorsaari (Kok); Kyllikki Pohjala (Kok); Antto Prunnila (SKDL); Viljo Rantala (SDP); Pertti Rapio (SKDL); Arvo Riihimäki (SKDL); Arvo Sävelä (SDP); and Irma Torvi (SKDL).

==== 1940s ====
===== 1948 =====
Results of the 1948 parliamentary election held on 1 and 2 July 1948:

Party		Party			Electoral Alliance		
Party		Votes	%	Seats	Votes	%	Seats
Social Democratic Party of Finland	SDP	37,524	29.73%	4	37,524	29.73%	4
Agrarian Party	ML	31,177	24.70%	3	31,177	24.70%	3
Finnish People's Democratic League	SKDL	28,531	22.60%	3	28,531	22.60%	3
National Coalition Party	Kok	25,595	20.28%	3	27,962	22.15%	3
National Progressive Party	KE	2,367	1.88%	0	27,962	22.15%	3
Small Farmers Party		963	0.76%	0	963	0.76%	0
Write-in lists		59	0.05%	0	59	0.05%	0
Valid votes		126,216	100.00%	13	126,216	100.00%	13
Rejected votes		613	0.48%				
Total polled		126,829	79.40%				
Registered electors		159,740					

The following candidates were elected: Laura Brander-Wallin (SDP); Kalle Joukanen (ML); Lauri Kaukamaa (Kok); Lauri Leppihalme (ML); Lauri Murtomaa (ML); Pentti Niemi (SDP); Hugo Nuorsaari (Kok); Kyllikki Pohjala (Kok); Antto Prunnila (SKDL); Viljo Rantala (SDP); Arvo Riihimäki (SKDL); Arvo Sävelä (SDP); and Irma Torvi (SKDL).

===== 1945 =====
Results of the 1945 parliamentary election held on 17 and 18 March 1945:

Party		Party			Electoral Alliance		
Party		Votes	%	Seats	Votes	%	Seats
Finnish People's Democratic League	SKDL	35,592	28.76%	4	38,740	31.31%	4
Small Farmers Party		3,148	2.54%	0	38,740	31.31%	4
Social Democratic Party of Finland	SDP	34,578	27.94%	4	34,578	27.94%	4
National Coalition Party	Kok	23,423	18.93%	2	26,516	21.43%	3
National Progressive Party	KE	3,093	2.50%	1	26,516	21.43%	3
Agrarian Party	ML	23,659	19.12%	3	23,659	19.12%	3
Write-in lists		255	0.21%	0	255	0.21%	0
Valid votes		123,748	100.00%	14	123,748	100.00%	14
Rejected votes		814	0.65%				
Total polled		124,562	79.43%				
Registered electors		156,825					

The following candidates were elected: Anshelm Alestalo (ML); Yrjö Kallinen (SDP); Kalle Kirra (ML); Walter Kuusela (SDP); Ensio Kytömaa (KE); Juho Mäkelä (SKDL); Lauri Murtomaa (ML); Kyllikki Pohjala (Kok); Antto Prunnila (SKDL); Viljo Rantala (SDP); Arvo Riihimäki (SKDL); Miina Sillanpää (SDP); Olga Virtanen (SKDL); and Matti Ytti (Kok).

==== 1930s ====
===== 1939 =====
Results of the 1939 parliamentary election held on 1 and 2 July 1939:

Party		Party			Electoral Alliance		
Party		Votes	%	Seats	Votes	%	Seats
Social Democratic Party of Finland	SDP	43,713	47.40%	7	43,713	47.40%	7
Agrarian Party	ML	18,517	20.08%	3	20,290	22.00%	3
National Progressive Party	KE	1,773	1.92%	0	20,290	22.00%	3
National Coalition Party	Kok	18,597	20.16%	3	18,597	20.16%	3
Patriotic People's Movement	IKL	7,246	7.86%	1	7,246	7.86%	1
Party of Smallholders and Rural People	PMP	2,374	2.57%	0	2,374	2.57%	0
Write-in lists		5	0.01%	0	5	0.01%	0
Valid votes		92,225	100.00%	14	92,225	100.00%	14
Rejected votes		749	0.81%				
Total polled		92,974	67.87%				
Registered electors		136,980					

The following candidates were elected: Paavo Aarniokoski (SDP); Kalle Joukanen (ML); Kaarlo Kares (IKL); Kalle Kirra (ML); Ville Komu (SDP); Kustaa Kylänpää (Kok); J. E. Malmivuori (SDP); Lauri Murtomaa (ML); Frans Mustasilta (SDP); Kyllikki Pohjala (Kok); Viljo Rantala (SDP); Miina Sillanpää (SDP); Kalle Soini (Kok); and Väinö Tanner (SDP).

===== 1936 =====
Results of the 1936 parliamentary election held on 1 and 2 July 1936:

Party		Party			Electoral Alliance		
Party		Votes	%	Seats	Votes	%	Seats
Social Democratic Party of Finland	SDP	40,813	47.98%	8	40,813	47.98%	8
Agrarian Party	ML	15,866	18.65%	3	31,176	36.65%	6
National Coalition Party	Kok	12,872	15.13%	3	31,176	36.65%	6
National Progressive Party	KE	2,438	2.87%	0	31,176	36.65%	6
Patriotic People's Movement	IKL	9,470	11.13%	1	9,470	11.13%	1
Small Farmers' Party of Finland	SPP	3,536	4.16%	0	3,536	4.16%	0
Write-in lists		67	0.08%	0	67	0.08%	0
Valid votes		85,062	100.00%	15	85,062	100.00%	15
Rejected votes		391	0.46%				
Total polled		85,453	64.16%				
Registered electors		133,191					

The following candidates were elected: Paavo Aarniokoski (SDP); Anshelm Alestalo (ML); Kalle Joukanen (ML); Arvi Jovero (SDP); Kaarlo Kares (IKL); Kalle Kirra (ML); Ville Komu (SDP); Kustaa Kylänpää (Kok); Antti Lastu (SDP); Frans Mustasilta (SDP); Kyllikki Pohjala (Kok); Viljo Rantala (SDP); Miina Sillanpää (SDP); Kalle Soini (Kok); and Väinö Tanner (SDP).

===== 1933 =====
Results of the 1933 parliamentary election held on 1, 2 and 3 July 1933:

Party		Votes	%	Seats
Social Democratic Labour Party of Finland	SDTP	37,335	46.28%	8
National Coalition Party and Patriotic People's Movement	Kok-IKL	19,779	24.52%	4
Agrarian Party	ML	15,250	18.90%	3
Small Farmers' Party of Finland	SPP	4,544	5.63%	0
National Progressive Party	KE	3,433	4.26%	0
Rural People's Party and Party of Finnish Labor		311	0.39%	0
Write-in lists		25	0.03%	0
Valid votes		80,677	100.00%	15
Rejected votes		400	0.49%	
Total polled		81,077	64.00%	
Registered electors		126,682		

The following candidates were elected: Eemeli Aakula (ML); Paavo Aarniokoski (SDTP); Anshelm Alestalo (ML); Kaarle Ellilä (ML); Taave Junnila (Kok-IKL); Ville Komu (SDTP); Antti Lastu (SDTP); J. E. Malmivuori (SDTP); Frans Mustasilta (SDTP); Niilo Pajunen (SDTP); Kyllikki Pohjala (Kok-IKL); Viljo Rantala (SDTP); Kalle Soini (Kok-IKL); Arne Somersalo (Kok-IKL); and Väinö Tanner (SDTP).

===== 1930 =====
Results of the 1930 parliamentary election held on 1 and 2 October 1930:

Party		Party			Electoral Alliance		
Party		Votes	%	Seats	Votes	%	Seats
Agrarian Party	ML	21,089	26.21%	4	44,856	55.75%	9
National Coalition Party	Kok	20,236	25.15%	5	44,856	55.75%	9
National Progressive Party	KE	3,531	4.39%	0	44,856	55.75%	9
Social Democratic Labour Party of Finland	SDTP	32,728	40.68%	6	32,728	40.68%	6
Small Farmers' Party of Finland	SPP	2,740	3.41%	0	2,740	3.41%	0
Write-in lists		136	0.17%	0	136	0.17%	0
Valid votes		80,460	100.00%	15	80,460	100.00%	15
Rejected votes		690	0.85%				
Total polled		81,150	65.67%				
Registered electors		123,576					

The following candidates were elected: Eemeli Aakula (ML); Toivo Aalto-Setälä (Kok); Fanny Ahlfors (SDTP); Anshelm Alestalo (ML); Emanuel Aromaa (SDTP); Kaarlo Huhtala (Kok); Kalle Joukanen (ML); Taave Junnila (Kok); Ville Komu (SDTP); Antero Lamminen (Kok); Walter Mäkelä (ML); Viljo Rantala (SDTP); Miina Sillanpää (SDTP); Kaarlo Sovijärvi (Kok); and Väinö Tanner (SDTP).

==== 1920s ====
===== 1929 =====
Results of the 1929 parliamentary election held on 1 and 2 July 1929:

Party		Votes	%	Seats
Social Democratic Labour Party of Finland	SDTP	25,448	36.94%	6
Agrarian Party	ML	17,653	25.62%	4
National Coalition Party	Kok	12,753	18.51%	3
Socialist Electoral Organisation of Workers and Smallholders	STPV	7,832	11.37%	2
National Progressive Party	KE	2,804	4.07%	0
Small Farmers' Party of Finland	SPP	2,297	3.33%	0
Write-in lists		112	0.16%	0
Valid votes		68,899	100.00%	15
Rejected votes		778	1.12%	
Total polled		69,677	55.67%	
Registered electors		125,159		

The following candidates were elected: Anshelm Alestalo (ML); Emanuel Aromaa (SDTP); K. J. Ellilä (ML); Taave Junnila (Kok); Kalle Kirra (ML); Ville Komu (SDTP); Antero Lamminen (Kok); Jalmari Leino (SDTP); Aina Lähteenoja (Kok); Walter Mäkelä (ML); Väinö Pohjaranta (STPV); Viljo Rantala (SDTP); Arvo Riihimäki (STPV); Hannes Ryömä (SDTP); and Miina Sillanpää (SDTP).

===== 1927 =====
Results of the 1927 parliamentary election held on 1 and 2 July 1927:

Party		Votes	%	Seats
Social Democratic Labour Party of Finland	SDTP	26,247	39.24%	6
National Coalition Party	Kok	16,121	24.10%	4
Agrarian Party	ML	13,759	20.57%	3
Socialist Electoral Organisation of Workers and Smallholders	STPV	6,793	10.16%	1
National Progressive Party	KE	3,905	5.84%	1
Write-in lists		67	0.10%	0
Valid votes		66,892	100.00%	15
Rejected votes		337	0.50%	
Total polled		67,229	56.59%	
Registered electors		118,792		

The following candidates were elected: Toivo Aalto-Setälä (Kok); Anshelm Alestalo (ML); Jussi Fahler (SDTP); Frans Härmä (Kok); Taave Junnila (Kok); Kalle Kirra (ML); Ville Komu (SDTP); Kustaa Kylänpää (Kok); Jalmari Leino (SDTP); Walter Mäkelä (ML); Viljo Rantala (SDTP); Arvo Riihimäki (STPV); Hannes Ryömä (SDTP); Miina Sillanpää (SDTP); and Walto Tuomioja (KE).

===== 1924 =====
Results of the 1924 parliamentary election held on 1 and 2 April 1924:

Party		Votes	%	Seats
Social Democratic Labour Party of Finland	SDTP	25,023	38.94%	6
National Coalition Party	Kok	17,514	27.25%	4
Agrarian Party	ML	11,035	17.17%	3
Socialist Electoral Organisation of Workers and Smallholders	STPV	5,994	9.33%	1
National Progressive Party	KE	4,642	7.22%	1
Write-in lists		55	0.09%	0
Valid votes		64,263	100.00%	15
Rejected votes		702	1.08%	
Total polled		64,965	58.46%	
Registered electors		111,135		

The following candidates were elected: Fanny Ahlfors (SDTP); Anshelm Alestalo (ML); Emanuel Aromaa (SDTP); Frans Härmä (Kok); Eino Heikura (ML); Lauri Ingman (Kok); Taave Junnila (Kok); Kalle Kirra (ML); Frans Mustasilta (SDTP); Viljo Rantala (SDTP); Miina Sillanpää (SDTP); Anshelm Sjöstedt-Jussila (Kok); Väinö Tanner (SDTP); Walto Tuomioja (KE); and Svantte Vuorio (STPV).

===== 1922 =====
Results of the 1922 parliamentary election held on 1, 2 and 3 July 1922:

Party		Votes	%	Seats
Social Democratic Labour Party of Finland	SDTP	21,860	35.75%	6
National Coalition Party	Kok	17,199	28.13%	4
Agrarian Party	ML	9,775	15.99%	2
Socialist Workers' Party of Finland	SSTP	7,713	12.61%	2
National Progressive Party	KE	4,559	7.46%	1
Write-in lists		38	0.06%	0
Valid votes		61,144	100.00%	15
Rejected votes		628	1.02%	
Total polled		61,772	58.48%	
Registered electors		105,636		

The following candidates were elected: Fanny Ahlfors (SDTP); J. O. Aromaa (SDTP); Toivo Aronen (SSTP); Frans Härmä (Kok); Lauri Ingman (Kok); Taave Junnila (Kok); Kalle Kirra (ML); Vilho Korhonen (SDTP); Kustaa Kylänpää (Kok); Viljo Rantala (SDTP); Risto Ryti (KE); Miina Sillanpää (SDTP); Väinö Tanner (SDTP); Juho Vesterlund (SSTP); and Bjarne Westermarck (ML).

==== 1910s ====
===== 1919 =====
Results of the 1919 parliamentary election held on 1, 2 and 3 March 1919:

Party		Party			Electoral Alliance		
Party		Votes	%	Seats	Votes	%	Seats
Social Democratic Labour Party of Finland	SDTP	31,735	45.94%	7	31,735	45.94%	7
National Coalition Party	Kok	19,995	28.94%	4	19,995	28.94%	4
Agrarian Party	ML	7,181	10.40%	1	9,130	13.22%	2
Christian Workers' Union of Finland	KrTL	1,949	2.82%	1	9,130	13.22%	2
National Progressive Party	KE	8,160	11.81%	2	8,160	11.81%	2
Write-in lists		60	0.09%	0	60	0.09%	0
Valid votes		69,080	100.00%	15	69,080	100.00%	15
Rejected votes		412	0.59%				
Total polled		69,492	69.90%				
Registered electors		99,421					

The following candidates were elected: Fanny Ahlfors (SDTP); Ivar Alanen (Kok); Mikko Collan (KE); Kalle Fredrik Hakala (SDTP); Ilmi Hallsten (Kok); Edvard Hannula (Kok); Juho Kekkonen (KrTL); Vilho Korhonen (SDTP); Oskari Leivo (SDTP); Toivo Rintala (SDTP); Risto Ryti (KE); Wäinö Selander (ML); Eemil Nestor Setälä (Kok); Miina Sillanpää (SDTP); and Väinö Tanner (SDTP).

===== 1917 =====
Results of the 1917 parliamentary election held on 1 and 2 October 1917:

Party		Votes	%	Seats
Social Democratic Party of Finland	SDP	45,174	57.47%	9
United Finnish Parties (Finnish Party, Young Finnish Party and People's Party)	SP-NP-KP	31,418	39.97%	6
Christian Workers' Union of Finland	KrTL	1,921	2.44%	0
Write-in lists		94	0.12%	0
Valid votes		78,607	100.00%	15
Rejected votes		478	0.60%	
Total polled		79,085	75.48%	
Registered electors		104,779		

The following candidates were elected: Ivar Alanen (SP-NP-KP); Emanuel Aromaa (SDP); Nestori Aronen (SDP); Aino Forsten (SDP); Edvard Gylling (SDP); Kyösti Haataja (SP-NP-KP); Juho Hakkinen (SDP); Lauri Ingman (SP-NP-KP); Juho Lautasalo (SDP); Jussi Puumala (SP-NP-KP); Albert Raitanen (SDP); Frans Rantanen (SDP); Eetu Salin (SDP); Eemil Nestor Setälä (SP-NP-KP); and Anshelm Sjöstedt-Jussila (SP-NP-KP).

===== 1916 =====
Results of the 1916 parliamentary election held on 1 and 3 July 1916:

Party		Votes	%	Seats
Social Democratic Party of Finland	SDP	42,601	64.49%	12
Finnish Party	SP	13,781	20.86%	3
Young Finnish Party	NP	6,937	10.50%	2
Christian Workers' Union of Finland	KrTL	2,675	4.05%	0
Write-in lists		61	0.09%	0
Valid votes		66,055	100.00%	17
Rejected votes		767	1.15%	
Total polled		66,822	63.34%	
Registered electors		105,489		

The following candidates were elected: Emanuel Aromaa (SDP); Nestori Aronen (SDP); Aino Forsten (SDP); Edvard Gylling (SDP); Kyösti Haataja (SP); Lucina Hagman (NP); Juho Hakkinen (SDP); Lauri Ingman (SP); Juho Lautasalo (SDP); Oskari Leivo (SDP); Sulho Leppä (SDP); Frans Oskar Lilius (NP); Otto Peitsalo (SDP); Albert Raitanen (SDP); Frans Rantanen (SDP); Miina Sillanpää (SDP); and Anshelm Sjöstedt-Jussila (SP).

===== 1913 =====
Results of the 1913 parliamentary election held on 1 and 2 August 1913:

Party		Party			Electoral Alliance		
Party		Votes	%	Seats	Votes	%	Seats
Social Democratic Party of Finland	SDP	35,939	58.38%	10	35,939	58.38%	10
Finnish Party	SP	16,366	26.59%	5	18,527	30.10%	5
Christian Workers' Union of Finland	KrTL	2,161	3.51%	0	18,527	30.10%	5
Young Finnish Party	NP	7,045	11.44%	2	7,045	11.44%	2
Write-in lists		45	0.07%	0	45	0.07%	0
Valid votes		61,556	100.00%	17	61,556	100.00%	17
Rejected votes		383	0.62%				
Total polled		61,939	57.10%				
Registered electors		108,481					

The following candidates were elected: Emanuel Aromaa (SDP); Nestori Aronen (SDP); Reinhold Grönvall (SP); Edvard Gylling (SDP); Lauri Ingman (SP); Mimmi Kanervo (SDP); Mikko Latva (NP); Juho Lautasalo (SDP); Oskari Leivo (SDP); Frans Oskar Lilius (NP); Frans Mustasilta (SDP); Frans Rantanen (SDP); Iisakki Saha (SP); Miina Sillanpää (SDP); Anshelm Sjöstedt-Jussila (SP); Väinö Tanner (SDP); and Kalle Vänniä (SP).

===== 1911 =====
Results of the 1911 parliamentary election held on 2 and 3 January 1911:

Party		Votes	%	Seats
Social Democratic Party of Finland	SDP	38,060	57.11%	10
Finnish Party	SP	17,364	26.06%	5
Young Finnish Party	NP	8,120	12.18%	2
Christian Workers' Union of Finland	KrTL	3,060	4.59%	0
Write-in lists		39	0.06%	0
Valid votes		66,643	100.00%	17
Rejected votes		458	0.68%	
Total polled		67,101	64.10%	
Registered electors		104,675		

The following candidates were elected: Emanuel Aromaa (SDP); Nestori Aronen (SDP); Reinhold Grönvall (SP); Edvard Gylling (SDP); Edvard Hannula (NP); Lauri Ingman (SP); Taave Junnila (SP); Mimmi Kanervo (SDP); J. F. Kivikoski (SDP); Wilho Laine (SDP); Juho Lautasalo (SDP); Oskari Leivo (SDP); Frans Oskar Lilius (NP); Juho Kusti Paasikivi (SP); Jussi Rainio (SDP); Frans Rantanen (SDP); and Anshelm Sjöstedt-Jussila (SP).

===== 1910 =====
Results of the 1910 parliamentary election held on 1 and 2 February 1910:

Party		Votes	%	Seats
Social Democratic Party of Finland	SDP	37,435	56.60%	10
Finnish Party	SP	17,790	26.90%	5
Young Finnish Party	NP	7,542	11.40%	2
Christian Workers' Union of Finland	KrTL	3,207	4.85%	0
Others		161	0.24%	0
Valid votes		66,135	100.00%	17
Rejected votes		416	0.63%	
Total polled		66,551	64.70%	
Registered electors		102,862		

The following candidates were elected: Emanuel Aromaa (SDP); Nestori Aronen (SDP); Reinhold Grönvall (SP); Edvard Gylling (SDP); Edvard Hannula (NP); Lauri Ingman (SP); Taave Junnila (SP); Mimmi Kanervo (SDP); J. F. Kivikoski (SDP); Wilho Laine (SDP); Juho Lautasalo (SDP); Oskari Leivo (SDP); Frans Oskar Lilius (NP); Juho Kusti Paasikivi (SP); Jussi Rainio (SDP); Frans Rantanen (SDP); and Anshelm Sjöstedt-Jussila (SP).

==== 1900s ====
===== 1909 =====
Results of the 1909 parliamentary election held on 1 and 3 May 1909:

Party		Votes	%	Seats
Social Democratic Party of Finland	SDP	38,735	54.65%	9
Finnish Party	SP	19,596	27.65%	5
Young Finnish Party	NP	8,171	11.53%	2
Christian Workers' Union of Finland	KrTL	4,151	5.86%	1
Others		223	0.31%	0
Valid votes		70,876	100.00%	17
Rejected votes		405	0.57%	
Total polled		71,281	69.67%	
Registered electors		102,312		

The following candidates were elected: Emanuel Aromaa (SDP); Nestori Aronen (SDP); Jonas Castrén (NP); Edvard Gylling (SDP); Edvard Hannula (NP); Lauri Ingman (SP); Taave Junnila (SP); Antti Kaarne (KrTL); Mimmi Kanervo (SDP); Frans Koskinen (SDP); Juho Lautasalo (SDP); Oskari Leivo (SDP); Väinö Nyström (SP); Frans Rapola (SP); Eetu Salin (SDP); Juho Seppä-Murto (SP); and Väinö Tanner (SDP).

===== 1908 =====
Results of the 1908 parliamentary election held on 1 and 2 July 1908:

Party		Votes	%	Seats
Social Democratic Party of Finland	SDP	38,080	54.62%	9
Finnish Party	SP	19,303	27.68%	5
Young Finnish Party	NP	7,813	11.21%	2
Christian Workers' Union of Finland	KrTL	4,284	6.14%	1
Others		244	0.35%	0
Valid votes		69,724	100.00%	17
Rejected votes		609	0.87%	
Total polled		70,333	70.48%	
Registered electors		99,793		

The following candidates were elected: Emanuel Aromaa (SDP); Edvard Gylling (SDP); Lauri Ingman (SP); Taave Junnila (SP); Antti Kaarne (KrTL); Mimmi Kanervo (SDP); Vilho Korhonen (SDP); Frans Koskinen (SDP); Mikko Latva (NP); Juho Lautasalo (SDP); Oskari Leivo (SDP); Juho Kusti Paasikivi (SP); Frans Rapola (SP); Frans Rantanen (SDP); Eemil Nestor Setälä (NP); Väinö Tanner (SDP); and Iida Vemmelpuu (SP).

===== 1907 =====
Results of the 1907 parliamentary election held on 15 and 16 March 1907:

Party		Votes	%	Seats
Social Democratic Party of Finland	SDP	41,705	54.84%	10
Finnish Party	SP	20,598	27.09%	5
Young Finnish Party	NP	7,557	9.94%	1
Christian Workers' Union of Finland	KrTL	4,246	5.58%	1
Swedish People's Party of Finland	SFP	234	0.31%	0
Others		1,709	2.25%	0
Valid votes		76,049	100.00%	17
Rejected votes		628	0.82%	
Total polled		76,677	78.53%	
Registered electors		97,642		

The following candidates were elected: Emanuel Aromaa (SDP); Emil Helkiö (SP); Lauri Ingman (SP); Taavetti Kalliokorpi (SDP); Mimmi Kanervo (SDP); Frans Koskinen (SDP); Wilho Laine (SDP); Oskari Leivo (SDP); J. R. Merinen (SDP); Matti Merivirta (KrTL); Juho Kusti Paasikivi (SP); Frans Rantanen (SDP); Frans Rapola (SP); Kalle Salminen (SDP); Eemil Nestor Setälä (NP); Väinö Tanner (SDP); and Iida Vemmelpuu (SP).
