= Leppa =

Leppa may refer to:

- Leppä River, a river of Sweden
- Leppä, Finnish surname
- Justin Leppitsch (born 1975), an Australian rules footballer
- A Sardinian knife; see Resolza
