= Junnila =

Junnila is a Finnish surname, most prevalent in Satakunta. Notable people with the surname include:

- Taave Junnila (1869–1943), Finnish farmer, bank director and politician
- Tuure Junnila (1910–1999), Finnish economist and politician
- Vilhelm Junnila (born 1982), Finnish politician
- Jyri Junnila (born 1984), Finnish ice hockey player
- Toni Junnila (born 1984), Finnish footballer
- Ella Junnila (born 1998), Finnish high jumper
