= Aarniokoski =

Disambiguation page

Aarniokoski is a surname. Notable people with the surname include:

- Doug Aarniokoski (born 1965), American television director and producer
- Paavo Aarniokoski (1893–1961), Finnish farmer and politician
