= Tuomioja =

Tuomioja is a Finnish surname. It may refer to:

- Erkki Tuomioja (born 1946), Finnish politician
- Sakari Tuomioja (1911–1964), Finnish politician
- Walto Tuomioja (1888–1931), Finnish lawyer, journalist and politician
