= Irma Rosnell =

Finnish politician (1927–2022)

Member of the Parliament of Finland
- In office 29 March 1954 – 20 March 1987
- Constituency: Satakunta

Personal details
- Born: Irma Maria Rosnell; 20 February 1927 Pori, Finland
- Died: 19 February 2022 (aged 94) Pori, Finland
- Party: SKDL; Democratic Alternative
- Education: University of Helsinki

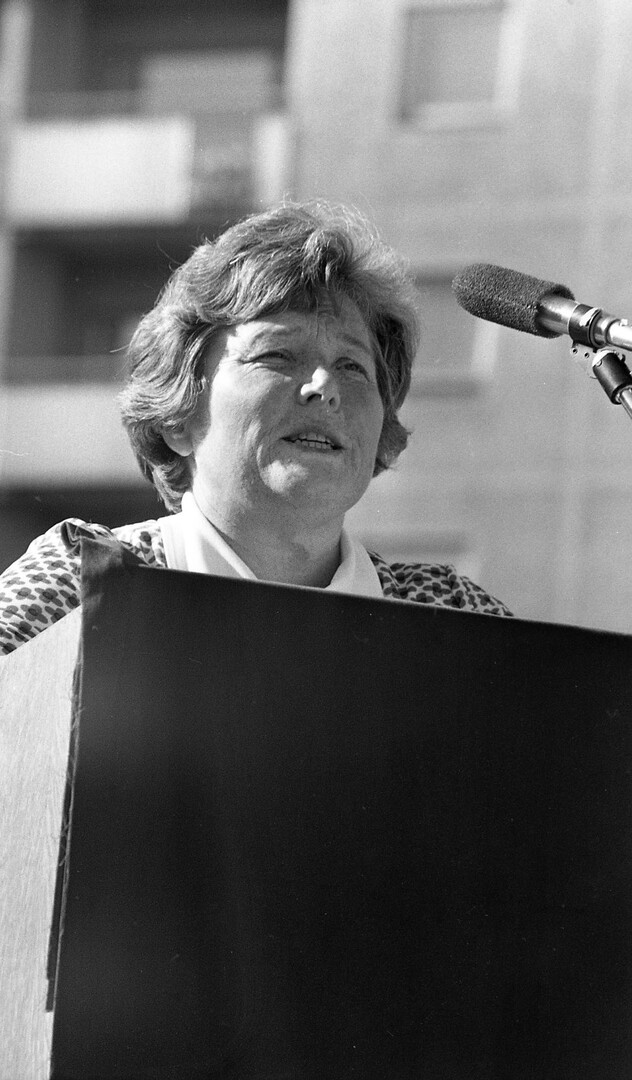
Irma Rosnell speaking at the Pori market square.

Irma Maria Rosnell (20 February 1927 – 19 February 2022) was a Finnish politician. A member of the Finnish People's Democratic League, she served in the Parliament of Finland from 1954 to 1987. She died in Pori on 19 February 2022, one day before her 95th birthday.
