= Jari Myllykoski =

Finnish politician

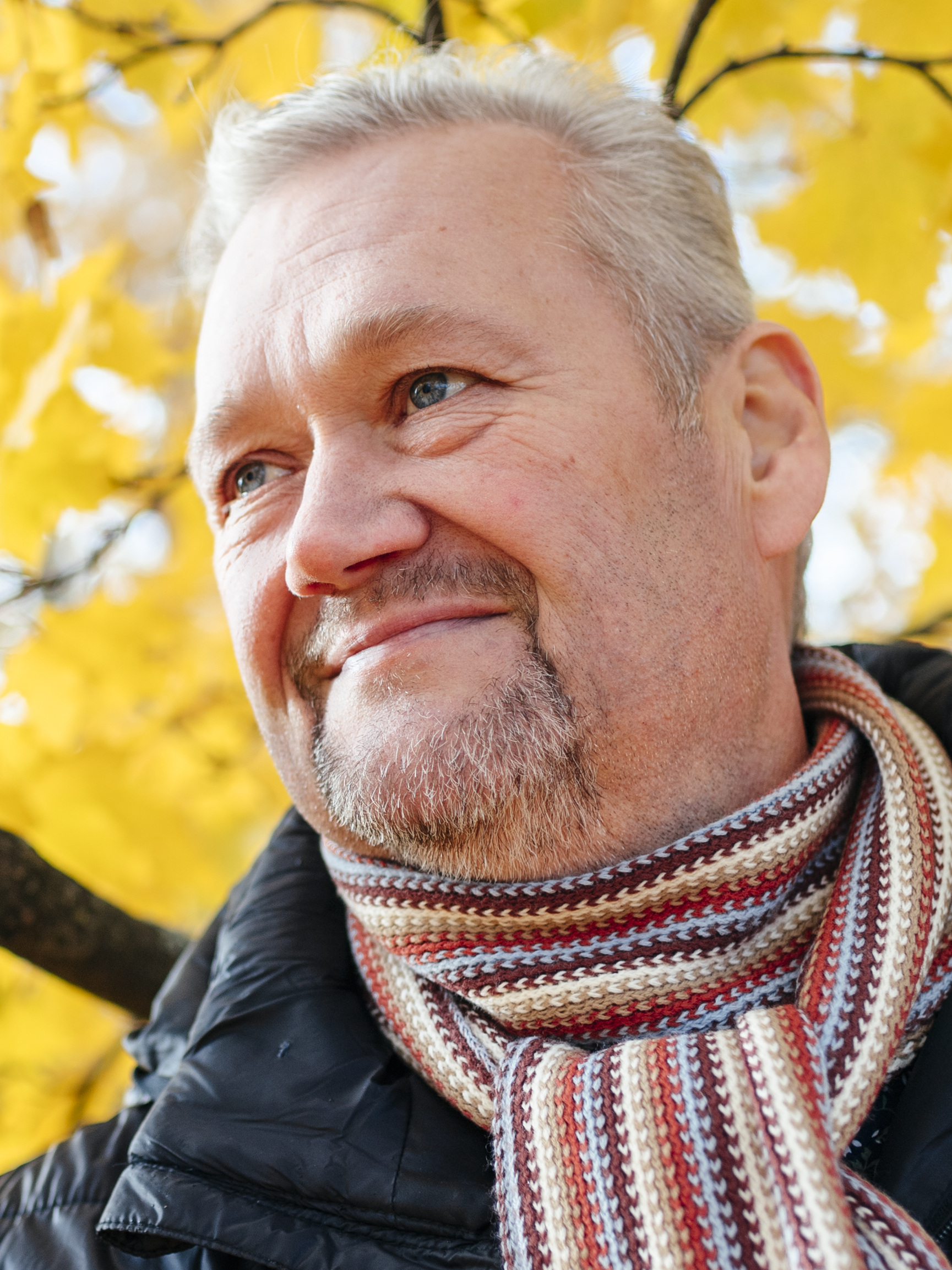
- Myllykoski in 2019

Member of the Finnish Parliament for Satakunta
- In office 20 April 2011 – 4 April 2023

Personal details
- Born: June 27, 1959 (age 66) Vaasa, Ostrobothnia, Finland
- Party: Left Alliance

Jari Heikki Myllykoski (born 27 June 1959 in Vaasa) is a Finnish politician who served in the Parliament of Finland for the Left Alliance at the Satakunta constituency from 2011 to 2023.
