= Jari Koskela =

Finnish politician

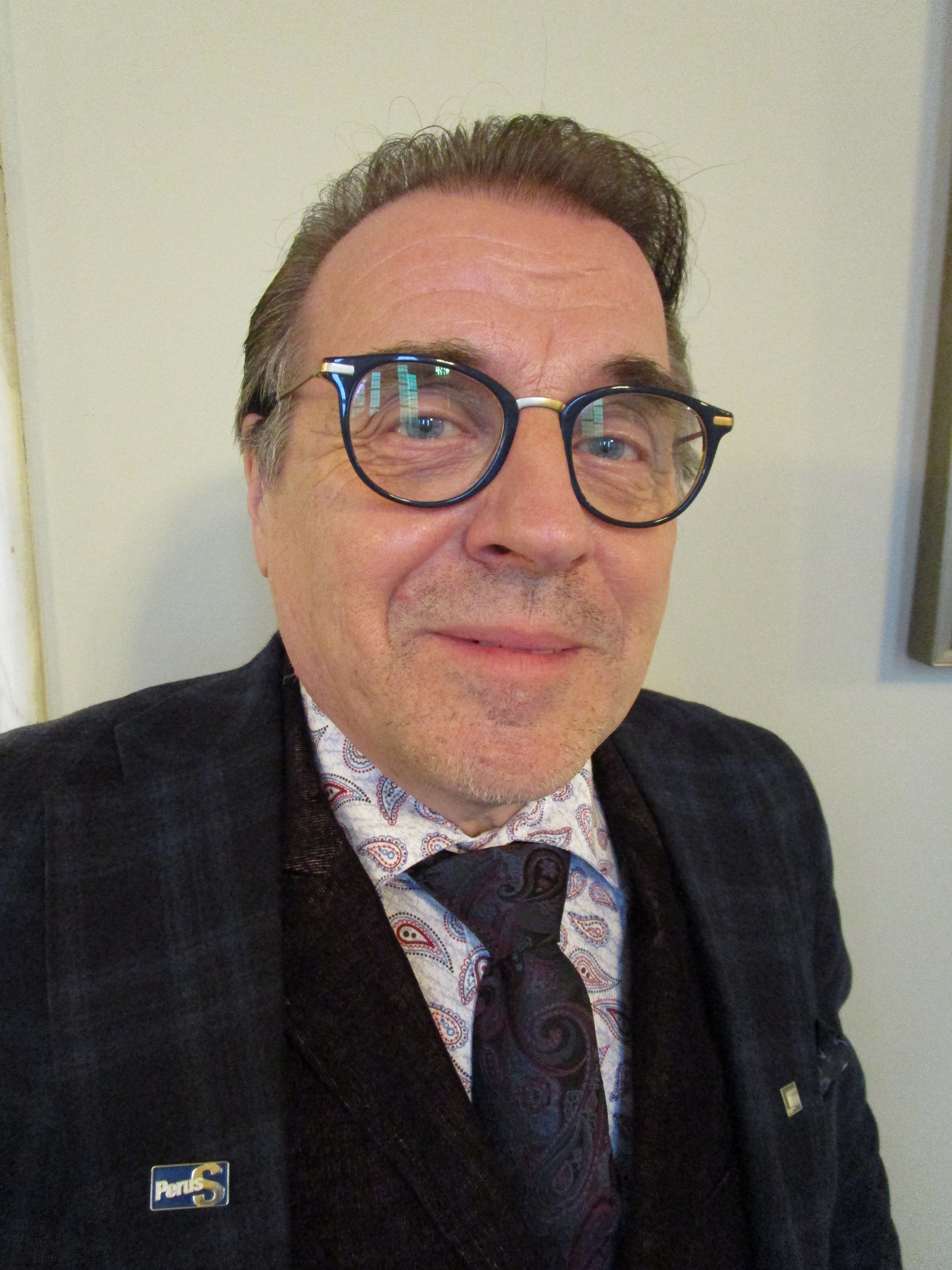
- Jari Koskela in Parliament on 29 November 2019

Member of the Finnish Parliament for Satakunta

Personal details
- Party: Finns Party

Jari Jukka Hannu Koskela is a Finnish politician currently serving in the Parliament of Finland for the Finns Party at the Satakunta constituency. He is a Pastor and Doctor of Social Science.
