= Eeva Kalli =

Finnish politician

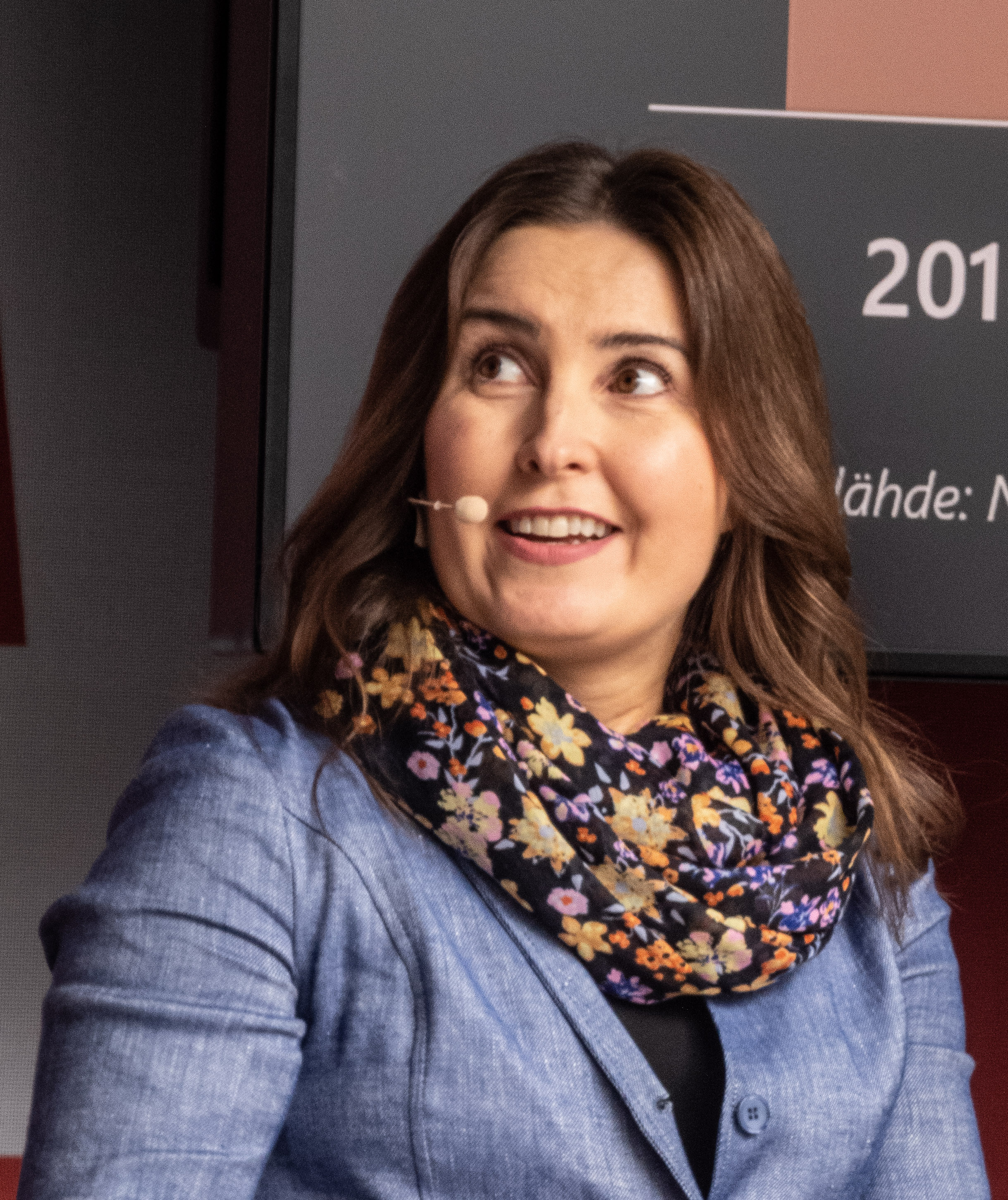
- image of Eeva Kalli

Member of the Finnish Parliament for Satakunta
- Incumbent
- Assumed office 17 April 2019

Personal details
- Born: 10 January 1981 (age 45) Kiukainen, Satakunta, Finland
- Party: Centre Party
- Education: University of Vaasa

Eeva Kalli (born 10 January 1981 in Kiukainen) is a Finnish politician currently serving in the Parliament of Finland for the Centre Party at the Satakunta constituency.
