= Heidi Viljanen =

Finnish politician

Member of the Finnish Parliament for Satakunta
- Incumbent
- Assumed office 17 April 2019

Personal details
- Born: August 18, 1980 (age 45) Kankaanpää, Satakunta, Finland
- Party: Social Democratic Party of Finland

Heidi Viljanen (born 18 August 1980 in Kankaanpää) is a Finnish politician currently serving in the Parliament of Finland for the Social Democratic Party of Finland at the Satakunta constituency.
