= Leppä =

Leppä is a Finnish surname of Laine type literally meaning "alder". Notable people with the surname include:

- Aleksi Leppä (born 1994), Finnish sport shooter
- Henry Leppä (1947–2025), Finnish ice hockey player
- Jari Leppä (born 1959), Finnish politician
- Jouko Leppä (born 1943), Finnish Olympic weightlifter
- Juhani Leppä (born 1948), Finnish politician
- Leo Leppä (1893–1958), Finnish politician
- Perttu Leppä (born 1964), Finnish film director and writer
- Sulho Leppä (1878–1918), Finnish politician
