= Sauli Ahvenjärvi =

Finnish politician

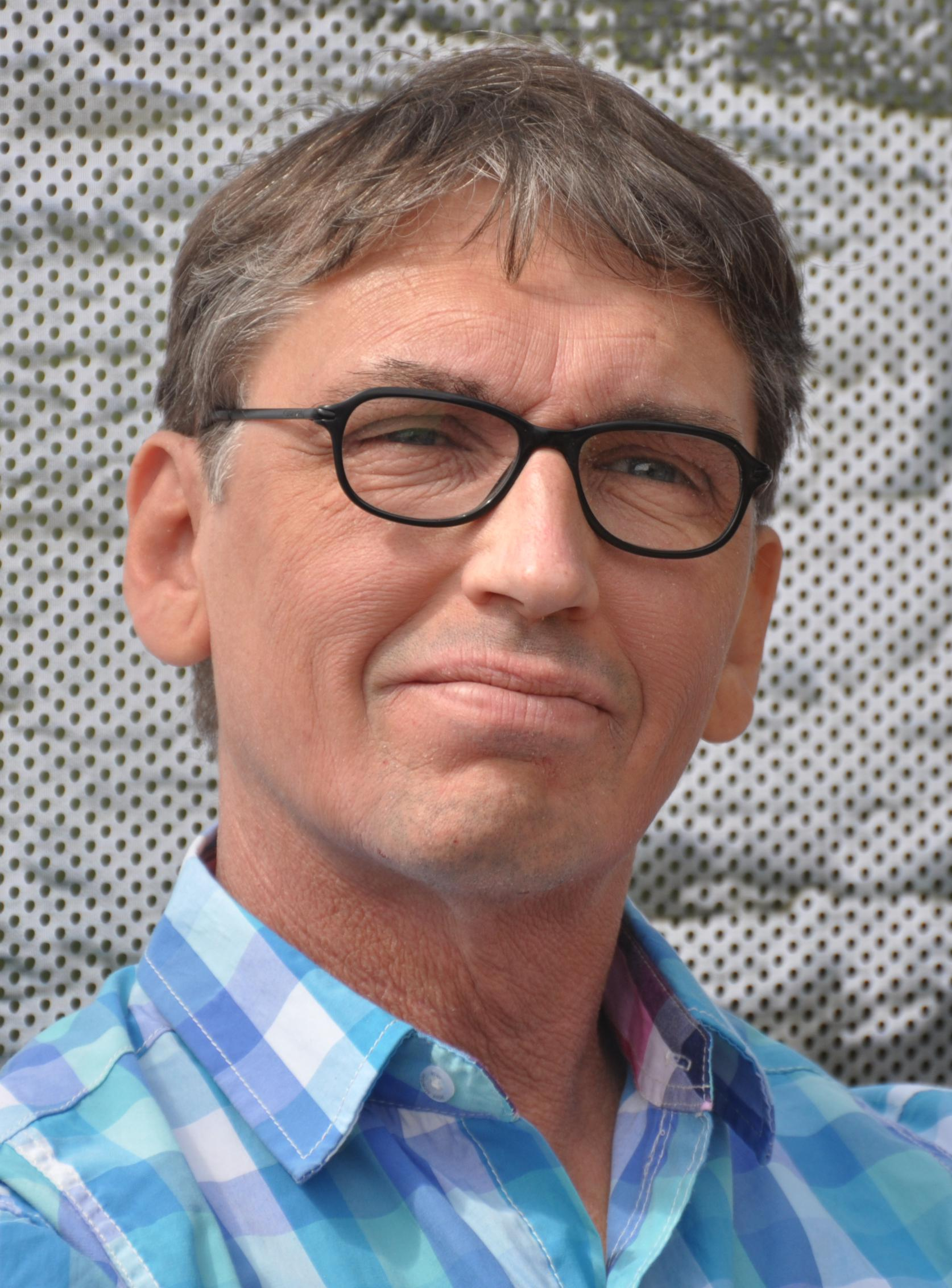
- Sauli Ahvenjärvi in 2012.

Member of the Parliament of Finland
- Incumbent
- Assumed office April 20, 2011

Personal details
- Born: August 18, 1957 (age 69)
- Party: Christian Democrats
- Spouse: Jaana Marja Kristiina Ahvenjärvi
- Education: Tampere University of Technology
- Occupation: Lecturer, software designer

Sauli Sakari Ahvenjärvi (b. 18 August 1957) is a Finnish politician, representing the Christian Democrats. He was a member of the Parliament of Finland 2011–2015 representing Satakunta.

== Career ==
Ahvenjärvi was elected to the parliament in the 2011 elections. He was a member of the Grand Committee, the Constitutional Law Committee and the Inter-Parliamentary Union, Finnish Group. Previously, he was a member of the Legal Affairs Committee and the Employment and Equality Committee.

Ahvenjärvi changed his electoral district to Pirkanmaa for the 2015 elections, but wasn't re-elected.
