= Aino Pohjanoksa =

Finnish politician (1936–2023)

- Born: 17 March 1936; Rauma, Finland
- Died: 5 June 2023 (aged 87); Rauma
- Occupations: professor, politician

Aino Sivia Pohjanoksa (17 March 1936 Rauma – 5 June 2023) was a Finnish assistant professor of educational sciences, educational consultant and politician.

== Life ==
Pohjanoksa served as a Member of Parliament for the National Coalition Party between 1983 and 1991. Elected from the Turku Province North parliamentary electoral district, Pohjanoksa was a member of the Education, Social and Economic Committee as well as the Second Law and Elections Committee.

She graduated from the University of Jyväskylä with a master's degree in educational sciences from the University of Jyväksylä in 1976, and as a doctor of educational sciences from the University of Turku in 1980. The title of her thesis in Pohjanoksa was Visuaalisen, verbaalisen ja taktiilisen luovuuden kehittäminen alkuopetusikäisillä (The Development of Visual, Verbal and Tactile Creativity in Primary School Children).
