= Petri Huru =

Finnish politician (born 1966)

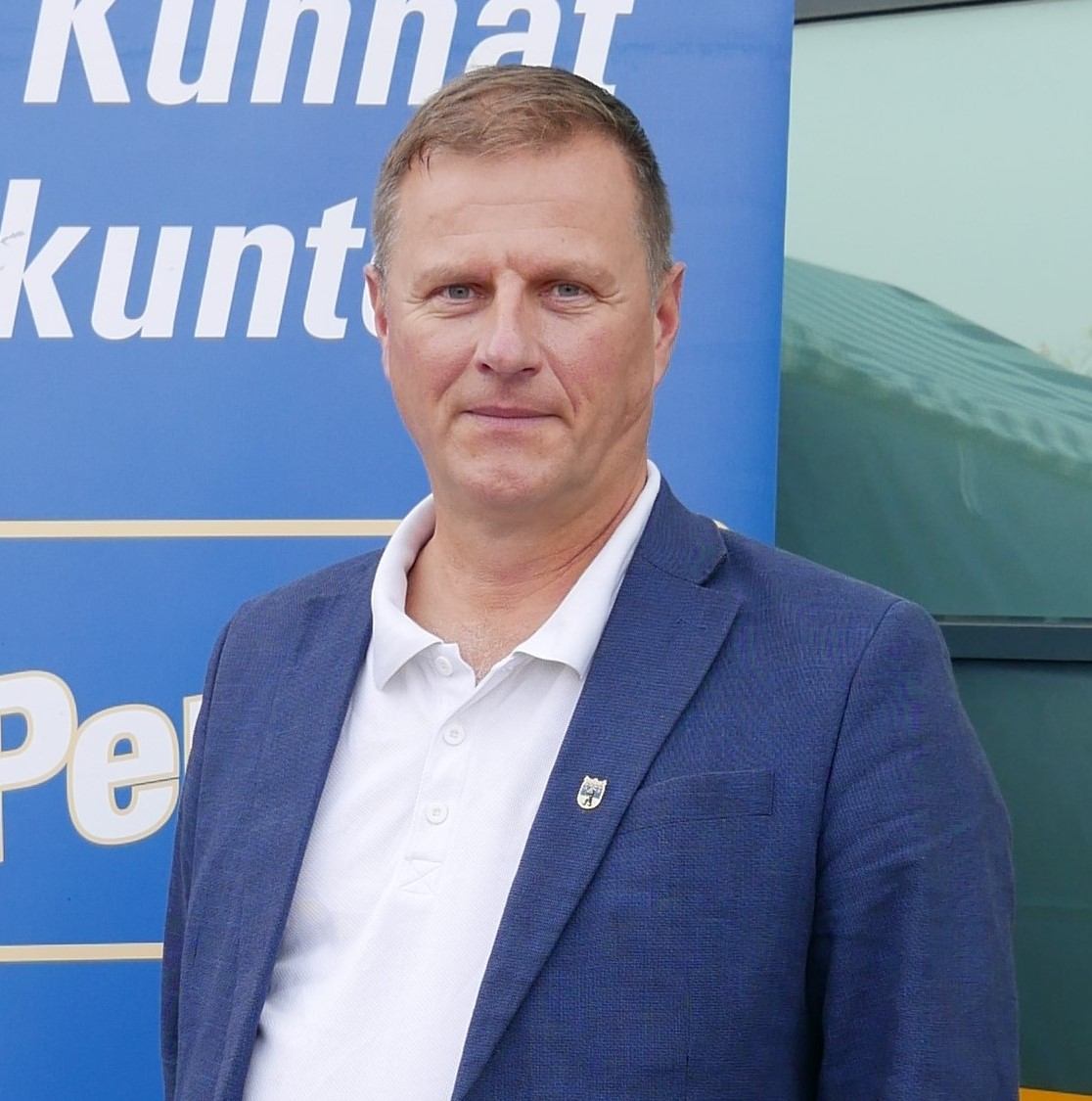

Member of the Finnish Parliament for Satakunta
- Incumbent
- Assumed office 2 July 2019

Personal details
- Born: 19 September 1966 (age 59) Pori, Satakunta, Finland
- Party: Finns Party

Petri Juhani Huru (born 19 September 1966 in Pori) is a Finnish politician currently serving in the Parliament of Finland for the Finns Party at the Satakunta constituency.
