= Albert Raitanen =

Finnish politician (1886–1918)

Kustaa Albert Raitanen (12 October 1886 – 1918) was a Finnish politician, born in Hinnerjoki. He was a member of the Parliament of Finland from 1916 until 1918, representing the Social Democratic Party of Finland (SDP). During the Finnish Civil War, he worked in the administration of the Finnish Socialist Workers' Republic. In April 1918, as the Red troops were retreating from Western Finland, Raitanen fled to Lahti, but disappeared shortly thereafter. He was seen in the city during the Battle of Lahti and according to some accounts, he died in the Hennala camp, but his body was never identified. He was declared legally dead in 1938.
