= Kustaa Kylänpää =

Finnish politician

Kustaa Kylänpää (24 October 1881 – 6 July 1961) was a Finnish Lutheran clergyman and politician, born in Rauma. He was a member of the Parliament of Finland from 1922 to 1924, from 1925 to 1929 and from 1936 to 1945, representing the National Coalition Party.

Elected from the Northern Turku Province electoral district, Kylänpää served as a member of the Legal and Economic Affairs Committee, the Legal Affairs Committee, the Economic Affairs Committee, and the Grand Committee. He was also a presidential elector in 1925 and 1943. He participated in the General Synod of the Evangelical Lutheran Church of Finland and served on the municipal councils of Hinnerjoki and Noormarkku, chairing the latter.

Kylänpää was ordained as a priest in 1907, the same year he completed his theological degree. He completed his pastoral examination in 1910. At the beginning of his ecclesiastical career, Kylänpää served as an assistant to the parish vicars of Sotkamo, Merikarvia, and Ulvila, and as acting chaplain of Honkilahti. After serving as vicar of Hinnerjoki and acting vicar of Honkilahti, he became vicar of Noormarkku in 1920, a position he held until 1953. He served as district provost of the Pori deanery from 1932 to 1950. He was also editor-in-chief of Länsi-Suomen herännäislehti, a religious publication.

Kylänpää's parents were the crofter Kustaa Kylänpää and Kristina Stenborg. He married Vilhelmiina Jokela in 1907.
