= Timo Roos =

Finnish politician (1936–2023)

Member of the Parliament of Finland for Satakunta
- In office 26 March 1983 – 23 March 1995

Personal details
- Born: Timo Antero Roos; 5 August 1936 Karkku, Finland
- Died: 22 October 2023 (aged 87) Hämeenlinna, Finland
- Party: SDP
- Education: University of Jyväskylä
- Occupation: Teacher

Timo Antero Roos (5 August 1936 – 22 October 2023) was a Finnish teacher and politician. A member of the Social Democratic Party, he served in the Parliament of Finland from 1983 to 1995.

Roos died on 22 October 2023 in Hämeenlinna, at the age of 87.
