= Väinö Vilponiemi =

Finnish trade unionist and politician (1925–2022)

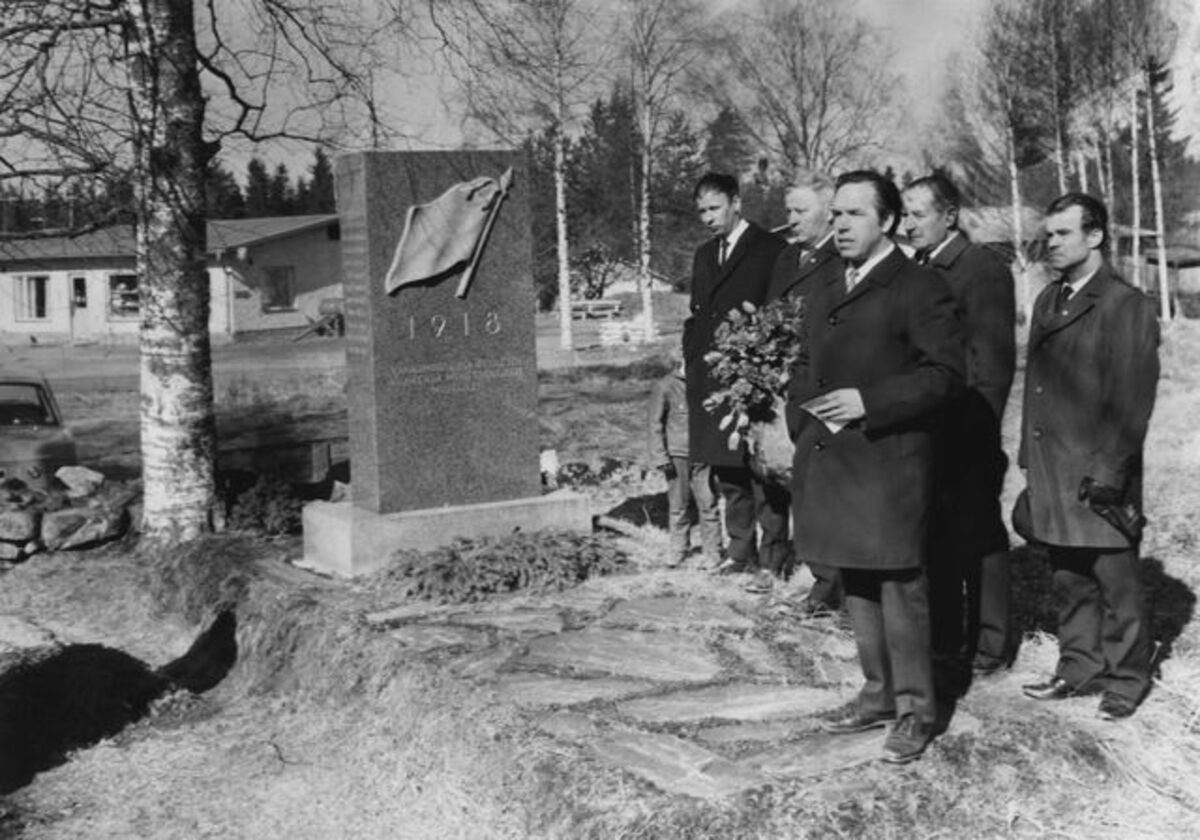
- Väinö Vilponiemi speaking in 1971

Member of the Parliament of Finland
- In office 20 February 1962 – 26 September 1975
- Constituency: Satakunta

Personal details
- Born: Väinö Antero Vilponiemi; 3 November 1925 Noormarkku, Finland
- Died: 10 September 2022 (aged 96)
- Party: SDP
- Education: Kiljava Institute; Työväen Akatemia
- Occupation: Trade unionist

Väinö Antero Vilponiemi (3 November 1925 – 10 September 2022) was a Finnish politician. A member of the Social Democratic Party of Finland, he served in the Parliament from 1962 to 1975.

Vilponiemi died on 10 September 2022, at the age of 96.
