= Sampsa Kataja =

Finnish politician and lawyer

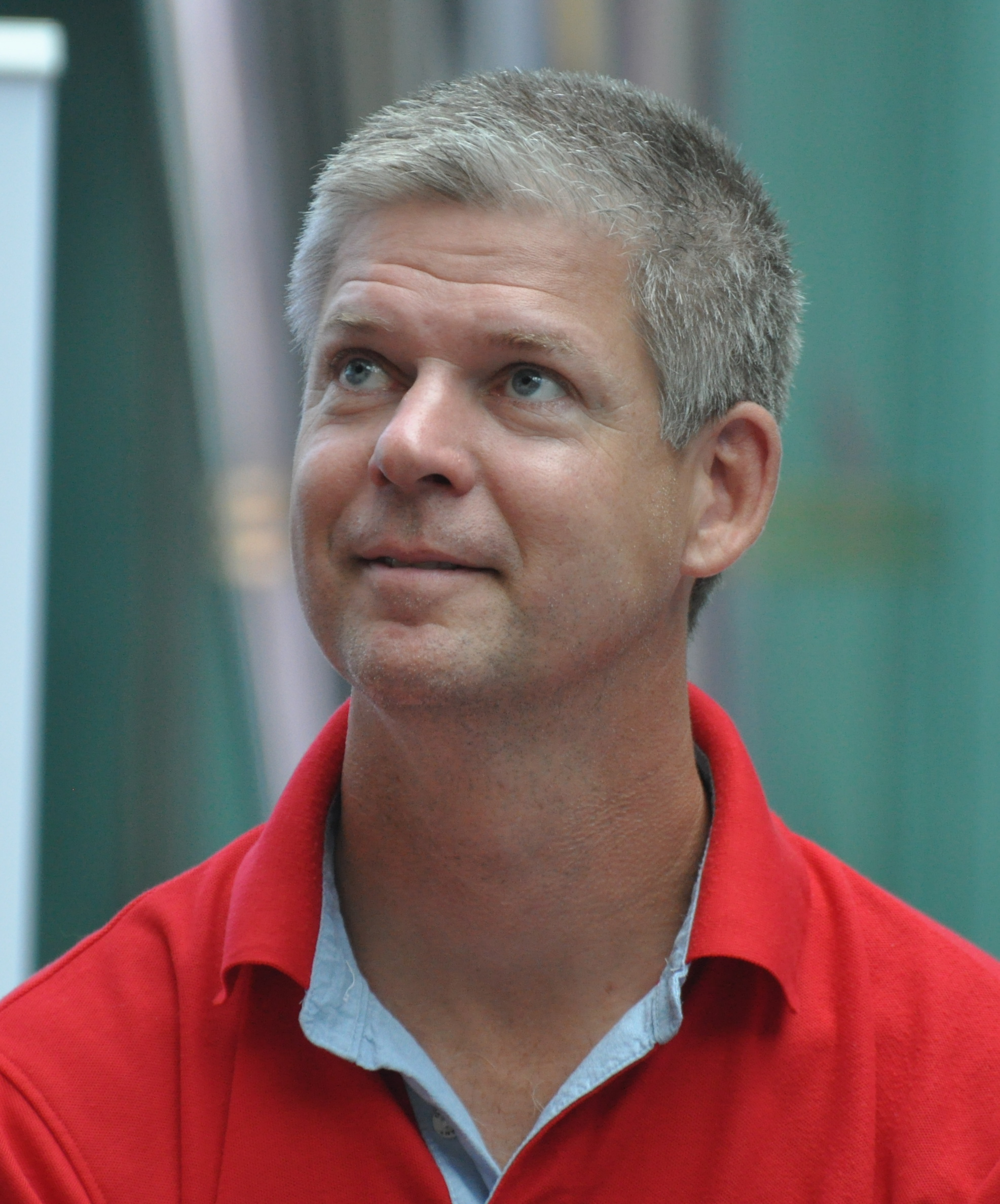

Member of the Parliament of Finland
- In office 2007–2015

Personal details
- Born: April 3, 1972 (age 52); Kerava, Finland
- Political party: National Coalition Party
- Occupation: Lawyer

Sampsa Kalle Henrikki Kataja (born 3 April 1972 in Kerava, Finland) is a Finnish politician, Member of Parliament and lawyer. Kataja has served in the Pori City Council from 1997 to 2017 and from 2021 to 2025, and as a member of the National Assembly for the Coalition Party of Finland from 2007 to 2015.

In 2015 Kataja left politics to become a partner in the international law firm Eversheds.

== Biography ==
Kataja graduated from the University of Turku with a Bachelor of Laws degree in 1998. He has also studied international law at Uppsala University in 1997. He became a deputy judge in 1999, after practising at the Pori District Court and the Court of Appeal in 1998–1999, after which he worked as a lawyer. He graduated as a lawyer in 2002.

=== Political career ===
Juniper was first elected to Parliament in the 2007 elections with 8 463 votes. He was the candidate with the highest number of votes in the Satakunta constituency. He was re-elected for a further term in the spring 2011 elections with 6 425 votes. In 2008–2012, he served two terms as vice-chairman of the Coalition Party. In Parliament, he was a member of the Legal Affairs Committee (2007–2011), the Education Committee (2007–2008, 2008–2009 and 2010–2011), the Finance Committee and its subcommittee on Administration and Security (2011–2015), and the Chairman of the Tax Chamber (2011–2015). He was also a member of the Finnish delegation to the OSCE Parliamentary Assembly from 2007 to 2011.

In December 2011 Kataja appeared drunk at a plenary session of the Parliament. The Coalition Party leadership condemned the behaviour as inappropriate, and Kataja apologised to Deputy Speaker Pekka Ravi.

In July 2014 Kataja announced that he would not stand as a candidate in the 2015 parliamentary elections. He said he wanted to spend more time with his family and return to his work as a lawyer and in business, but would continue to work in Pori municipal politics. Kataja also did not consider the salaries of MPs competitive enough to attract people such as lawyers and other experts into politics.
