= Pentti Antila =

Finnish politician (1926–1997)

Pentti Malakias Antila (28 September 1926, in Lavia – 20 August 1997) was a Finnish agronomist, farmer and politician. He was a member of the Parliament of Finland, representing the Finnish Rural Party (SMP) from 1970 to 1972 and the Finnish People's Unity Party (SKYP) from 1972 to 1975.
