= Raila Aho =

Finnish office worker and politician

Raila Orvokki Aho (née Rosendahl; born 31 October 1937 in Pomarkku) is a Finnish office worker and politician. She was a member of the Parliament of Finland, representing the Finnish People's Democratic League (SKDL) from 1987 to 1990 and the Left Alliance from 1990 to 1995.
