= Aulis Juvela =

Finnish journalist and politician (1927–1999)

Aulis Alarik Juvela (25 August 1927 – 3 April 1999) was a Finnish journalist and politician, born in Parkano. He was a member of the Parliament of Finland from 1966 to 1983, representing the Finnish People's Democratic League (SKDL). Juvela was a member of the Communist Party of Finland (SKP). He was a presidential elector in the 1968, 1978 and 1982 presidential elections.
