= Aulis Sileäkangas =

Finnish politician

Aulis Vilhelm Sileäkangas (17 June 1923, Pomarkku - 22 December 2013) was a Finnish farmer and politician. He was a member of the Parliament of Finland from 1966 to 1970 and again from 1972 to 1975, representing the Centre Party.
