= Reinhold Grönvall =

Reinhold Grönvall (1 May 1851, Pori - 3 March 1916) was a Finnish Lutheran clergyman. He was a member of the Parliament of Finland from 1910 until his death in 1916, representing the Finnish Party.
