= Pentti Niemi =

Finnish clergyman and politician

Pentti Olavi Niemi (1902–1962) was a Finnish Lutheran clergyman and politician. He was born on 9 July 1902 in Tampere, and was a member of the Parliament of Finland from 1948 to 1954 and again from 1958 until his death on 7 February 1962, representing the Social Democratic Party of Finland (SDP).
