= Juho Lautasalo =

Finnish smallholder and politician (1862–1940)

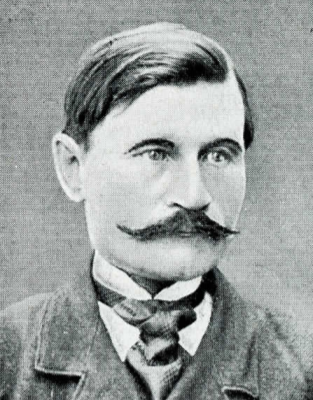
Juho Lautasalo (1908)

Johan ”Juho” Antinpoika Lautasalo (28 April 1862 – 21 February 1940; former surnames Åkerbacka, Hietaniemi and Pihlaja) was a Finnish smallholder and politician, born in Karvia. He was a member of the Parliament of Finland from 1908 to 1918, representing the Social Democratic Party of Finland (SDP). He participated in the Finnish Civil War on the Red side. After the war, Lautasalo was incarcerated for five years. He recovered his liberty in 1923.
