= Matti Raipala =

Finnish agronomist, farmer and politician (1912–1988)

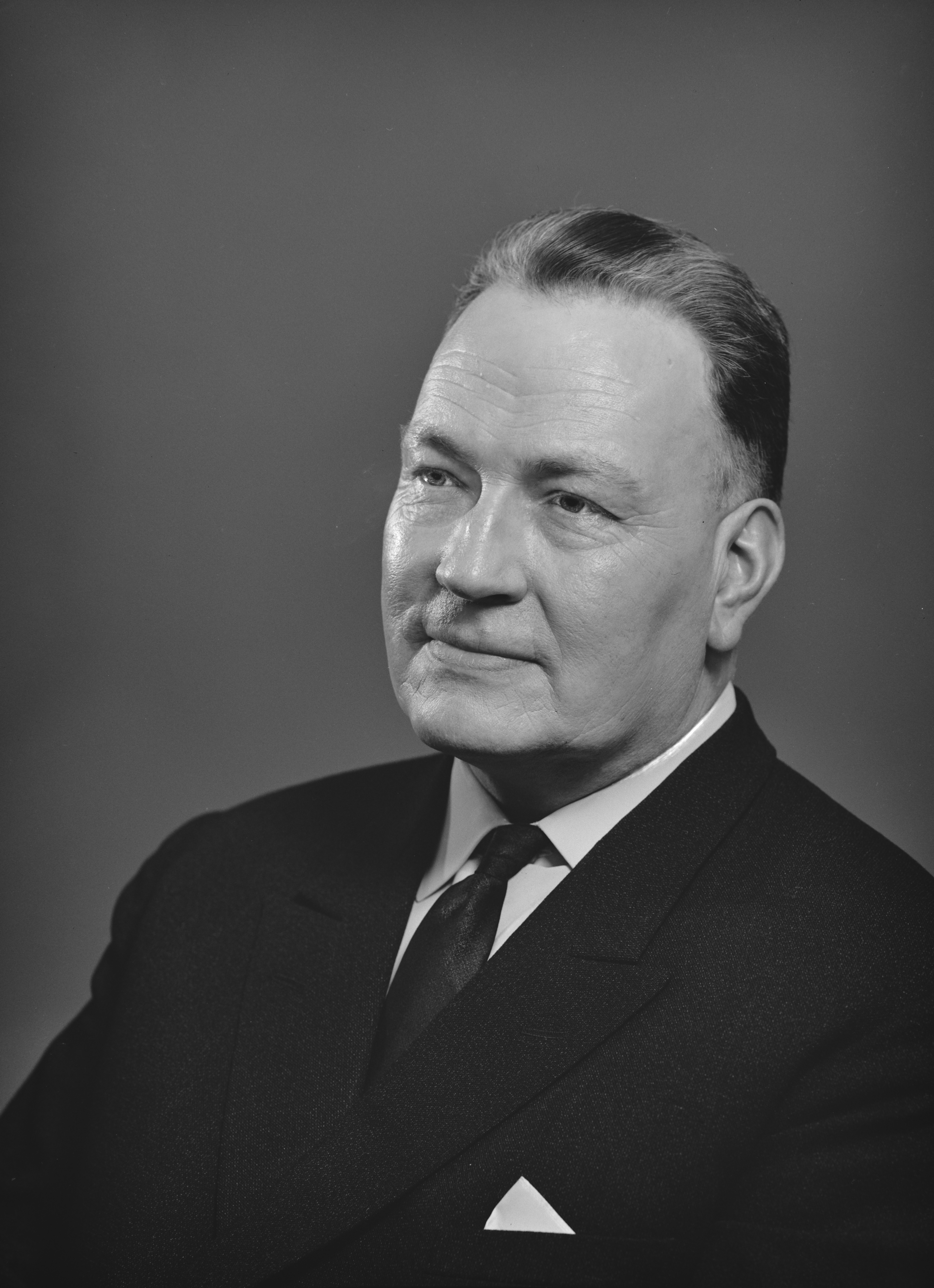
Matti Raipala in 1966

Matti Mauno Raipala (20 February 1912 – 1 March 1988) was a Finnish agronomist, farmer and politician, born in Hämeenkyrö. He was a member of the Parliament of Finland from 1954 to 1970, representing the National Coalition Party. He was a presidential elector in the 1956, 1962 and 1968 presidential elections.
