= Frans Koskinen =

Finnish politician and journalist

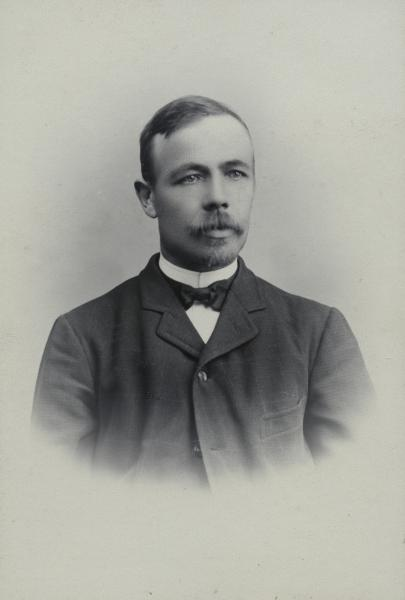
Frans Herman Koskinen

Frans Herman Koskinen (8 March 1869 – 26 April 1918; original surname Tähti) was a Finnish journalist and politician, born in Maaria. He was a member of the Parliament of Finland from 1907 to 1911, representing the Social Democratic Party of Finland (SDP). In 1918 he was imprisoned for having sided with the Reds during the Finnish Civil War. He died in detention at Hollola.
