= Leppä River =

Location
- Country: Sweden

Leppä River, locally known as Leppäjoki, is a small watercourse in northern Sweden. It feeds the Vuosto River, which flows into the Tärendö River.
