= Uljas Mäkelä =

Finnish politician (1924–2010)

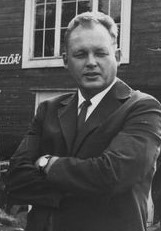
Uljas Mäkelä in 1969

Uljas Kalevi Mäkelä (21 August 1924 – 16 November 2010) was a Finnish politician, born in Lapua. He was a member of the Parliament of Finland from 1962 to 1978, representing the Social Democratic Party of Finland (SDP). Mäkelä was the mayor of Rauma from 1978 to 1988. He was a presidential elector in the 1962, 1968, 1978, 1982 and 1988 presidential elections.
