= Eemeli Aakula =

Finnish politician

Mikkel Emil Aakula
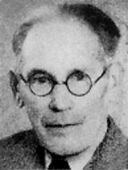

Member of Parliament
- In office 1930–1936
- Constituency: Turku North

Personal details
- Born: 12 June 1879 Finland
- Died: 26 July 1955 (aged 76) Kokemäki, Finland
- Party: Centre Party (Finland)
- Occupation: Land surveyor, farmer, politician
- Awards: Kunnallisneuvos (1952)

Mikkel Emil (Mikko Eemeli) Aakula (June 12, 1879 – July 26, 1955) was a Finnish politician. He was a member of the Centre Party (Finland) from 1930 to 1936 in Turku North Constituency.

Aakula worked as a land surveyor and farmer. Following his parliamentary term, he served as the municipal treasurer and a member of the municipal board in Kokemäki. In recognition of his contributions, he was awarded the honorary title kunnallisneuvos in 1952.

He died in Kokemäki in 1955.
