= Kaarlo Huhtala =

Finnish politician

Kaarlo Vilho Huhtala (13 October 1874 in Ulvila – 7 February 1941) was a Finnish farmer and politician. He took part in the Finnish Civil War on the White side. He was a member of the Parliament of Finland from 1930 to 1933, representing the National Coalition Party. Huhtala was also active in the Lapua Movement.
