= Frans Rantanen =

Finnish construction worker and politician (1874–1921)

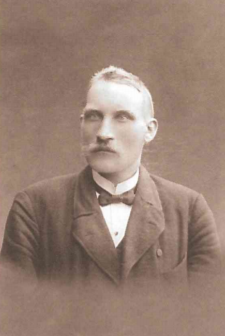
Frans Rantanen

Frans Vihtori Rantanen (14 February 1874 – 29 August 1921) was a Finnish construction worker and politician, born in Kokemäki. He was a member of the Parliament of Finland from 1907 to 1909 and from 1910 to 1918, representing the Social Democratic Party of Finland (SDP). He kept a low profile during the Finnish Civil War and tried to resume his duties as a Member of Parliament after the defeat of the Red side in May 1918, but was arrested, as the White authorities considered that the articles he had signed with a pseudonym in the press of his party during the Civil War constituted proof of his involvement on the Red side. In October 1918, he was given a suspended prison sentence of five years and resumed his liberty.
