= Frans Mustasilta =

Finnish politician

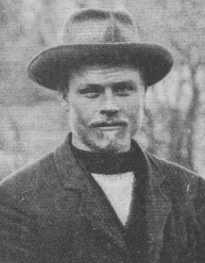
Frans Mustasilta at the turn of the 1910s.

Frans Vilho Mustasilta (27 September 1879 - 29 May 1949) was a Finnish smallholder and politician, born in Lavia. He was a member of the Parliament of Finland from 1913 to 1916, from 1924 to 1927 and from 1933 to 1945, representing the Social Democratic Party of Finland (SDP).
