= Oskari Leivo =

Finnish politician (1876–1921)

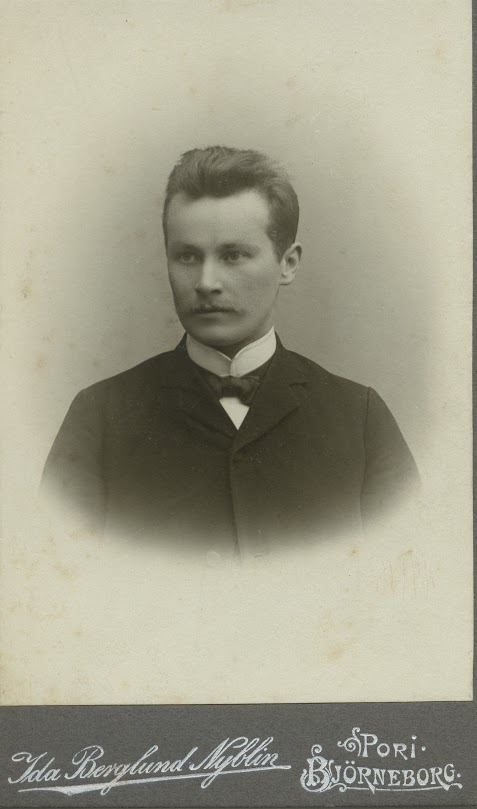
Oskari Leivo

Juho Oskar (Oskari) Leivo (1 May 1876 – 12 December 1921; original surname Kramplin) was a Finnish politician, born in Huittinen. He was a member of the Parliament of Finland from 1907 to 1910, from 1911 to 1917 and from 1919 until his death in 1921, representing the Social Democratic Party of Finland (SDP). He did not participate in the Finnish Civil War. Nevertheless, he was the object of an official investigation for his alleged role in the war. In December 1918, he was exonerated by a court and could resume his political activities. A few months later, he was again elected Member of Parliament in the 1919 Finnish parliamentary election.
