= Anshelm Sjöstedt-Jussila =

Finnish politician (1869–1926)

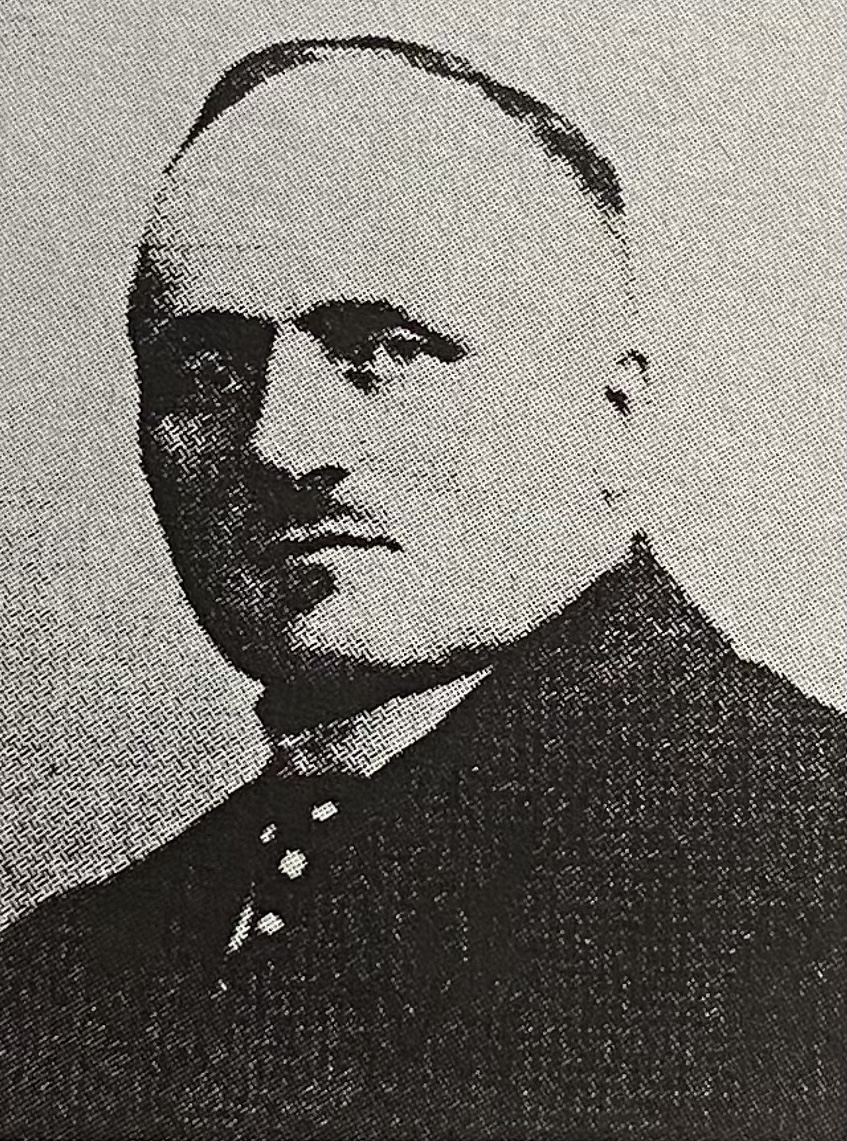
Anshelm Sjöstedt-Jussila

Oskar Anshelm Sjöstedt-Jussila (25 August 1869 in Akaa – 6 February 1926; original surname Sjöstedt) was a Finnish farmer and politician. He was a member of the Parliament of Finland, representing the Finnish Party from 1911 to 1918 and the National Coalition Party from 1918 to 1919 and from 1924 to 1925.
