= Arvo Sävelä =

Finnish politician

Arvo Päiviö Sävelä (30 June 1908, Kankaanpää - 17 November 1976; surname until 1936 Sjöviiki) was a Finnish smallholder and politician. He was a member of the Parliament of Finland from 1948 to 1962, representing first the Social Democratic Party of Finland (SDP), later the Social Democratic Union of Workers and Smallholders (TPSL).
