= Ivar Alanen =

Finnish politician (1863–1936)

Ivar Alanen (previously Lammi; February 11, 1863 in Virrat – March 28, 1936 in Parkano) was a Finnish politician representing Old Finnish Party and National Coalition Party. He was elected to the Parliament of Finland in 1917 from the constituency of Turku Province North and served until 1922. Alanen was a member of Grand, Agriculture and Economy Committees of the parliament.

He married Maria Hirvimäki in 1891 and lived as a farmer in Parkano 1894–1936, where he was also involved administration of the municipality.
