= Toivo Aalto-Setälä =

Finnish lawyer and politician

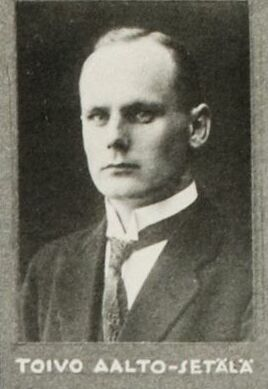

Member of the Parliament of Finland
- In office 1927–1929
- In office 1930–1933

Personal details
- Born: Toivo Armas Aalto-Setälä; 2 February 1896; Köyliö, Satakunta, Finland
- Died: 3 April 1977 (aged 81)
- Political party: National Coalition

Toivo Armas Aalto-Setälä (2 February 1896 – 3 April 1977) was a Finnish lawyer and politician. He was born in Köyliö and was a member of the Parliament of Finland from 1927 to 1929 and from 1930 to 1933, representing the National Coalition Party.
