= Laura Brander-Wallin =

Finnish politician

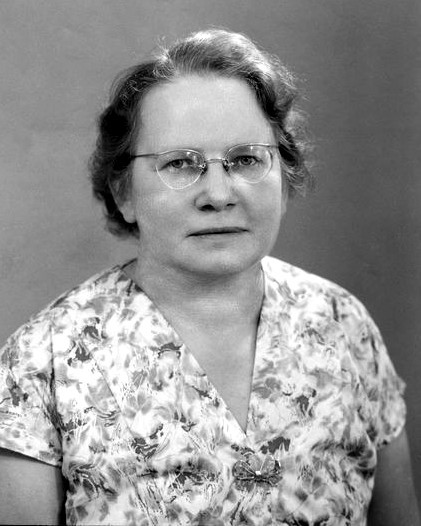
Laura Irene Brander-Wallin

Laura Irene Brander-Wallin (née Brander; 5 April 1909 – 1 January 1994) was a Finnish seamstress and politician, born in Pori. She was a member of the Parliament of Finland from 1948 to 1958 and again for a short time in 1962. She was at first a member of the Social Democratic Party of Finland (SDP) and later of the Social Democratic Union of Workers and Smallholders (TPSL).
