= Emanuel Aromaa =

Finnish politician

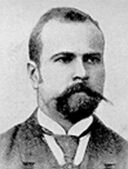
Emanuel Aromaa

Emanuel Aromaa (born Emanuel Sylgren; 27 February 1873 – 14 January 1933) was a Finnish shoemaker and politician, born in Teisko. He was a member of the Parliament of Finland from 1907 to 1918, from 1924 to 1927 and from 1929 until he died in 1933, representing the Social Democratic Party of Finland (SDP). He was imprisoned in 1918 for having sided with the Reds during the Finnish Civil War.
