= Frans Härmä =

Finnish politician and journalist (1881–1962)

Frans Vihtori Härmä (15 September 1881 – 3 January 1962) was a Finnish school director and politician, born in Tyrvää. He was a member of the Parliament of Finland from 1922 to 1929, representing the National Coalition Party. He was the mayor of Pori from 1929 to 1947.
