= Anssi Joutsenlahti =

Finnish clergyman & politician (b.1943)

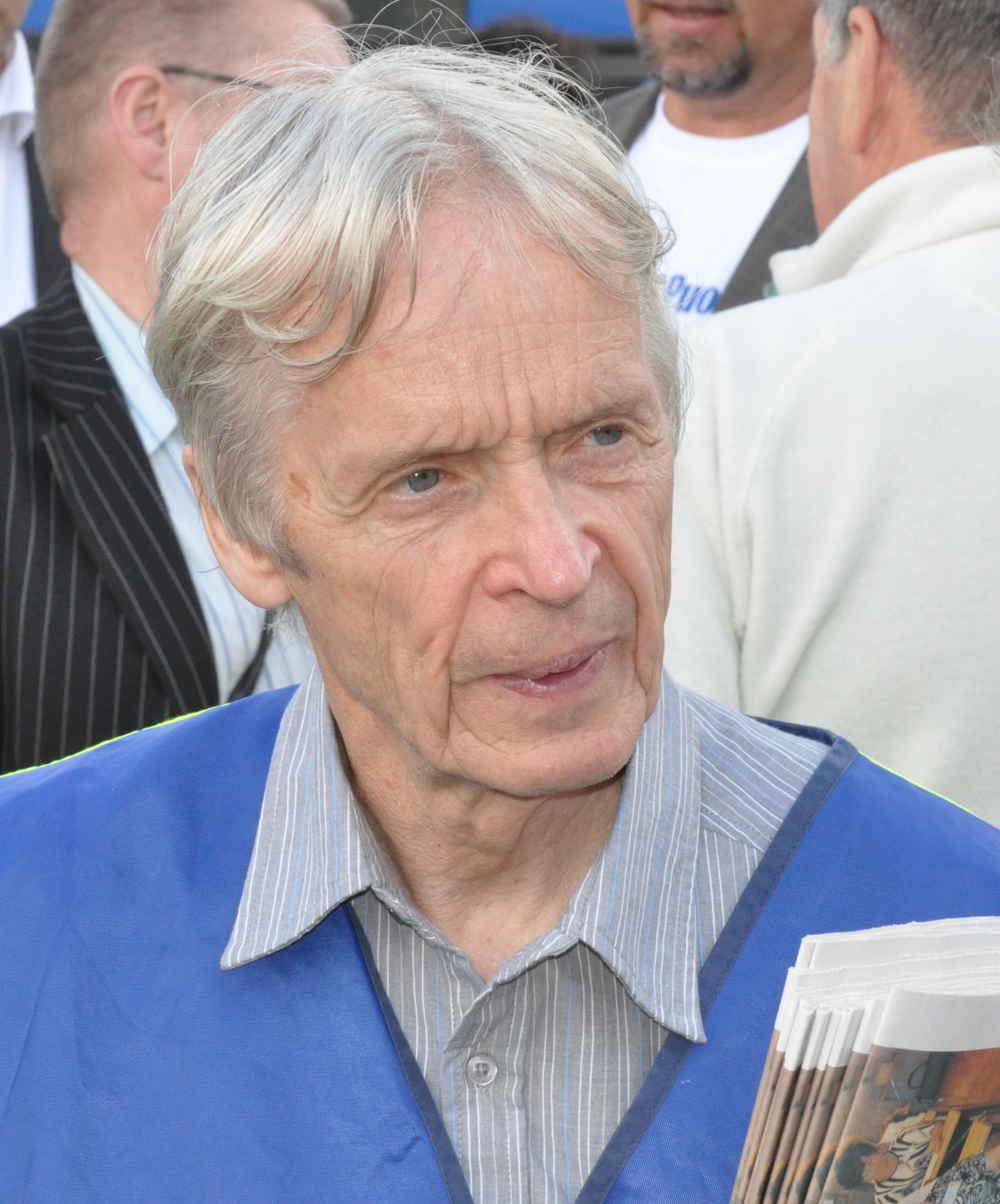
- Anssi Joutsenlahti in 2011.

Personal details
- Born: 17 September 1943 (age 83) Kankaanpää
- Party: True Finns
- Occupation: clergyman (retired rector and provost)
- Website: http://www.anssijoutsenlahti.fi

Taito Anssi Ilmari Joutsenlahti is a retired clergyman of the Evangelical Lutheran Church of Finland and a member of the parliament of Finland. He was most recently elected in the 2011 election, representing the Finns Party. In the parliament he was made 2nd deputy Speaker of the parliament.

== Background ==
Joutsenlahti first served in the parliament in 1979–1987 as an MP of the Rural Party of Finland, the predecessor to the Finns Party. When elected in 2011 Joutsenlahti promised to donate all his pay received from being an MP to charity.

Joutsenlahti also serves in local government, in the city council of Kankaanpää as a second deputy chairman. He also works as a priest. He has run 75 marathons representing the Kankaanpään Urheilijat (the Sportsmen of Kankaanpää) sports club.

== Career ==
- Rector in Jämijärvi and Jurva Evangelical Lutheran parishes
- Acting chaplain in the Kankaanpää, Noormarkku and Middle-Pori Evangelical Lutheran parishes
- Treasurer of the society of the Karhoinen cottage water way rehabilitation society (Karhoismajan vesireittien kunnostusyhdistys)
- Vice member of the board of the Vatajankosken Sähkö Oy (The electric and heat producing company of the Northern Satakunta)
