= Arvo Riihimäki =

Finnish politician

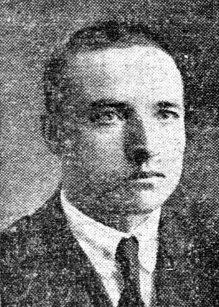
Arvo Vihtori Riihimäki, Member of the Parliament of Finland Arvo Riihimäki (1891-1972)

Arvo Vihtori Riihimäki (29 May 1891, Lavia - 13 December 1972) was a Finnish smallholder and politician. He was a member of the Parliament of Finland, representing the Socialist Electoral Organisation of Workers and Smallholders (STPV) from 1927 to 1930 and the Finnish People's Democratic League (SKDL) from 1945 to 1954. He was in prison for political reasons from 1930 to 1932.
