= Ensio Kytömaa =

Finnish jurist and politician (1902–1970)

Ensio Kullervo Kytömaa (30 January 1902 – 21 August 1970) was a Finnish jurist and politician, born in Mikkeli. He was a member of the Parliament of Finland from 1945 to 1948, representing the National Progressive Party. He was the mayor of Haaga from 1933 to 1937.
