= Emil Helkiö =

Finnish member of parliament (1870–1941)

Johan Emil Helkiö (1 October 1870 in Rauman maalaiskunta – 16 August 1941; original surname Hellman) was a Finnish farmer, lay preacher and politician. He was a member of the Parliament of Finland from 1907 to 1908, representing the Finnish Party.
