= Antti-Veikko Perheentupa =

Finnish psychotherapist and politician (1930–2007)

Antti-Veikko Olavi Perheentupa (3 November 1930 – 13 October 2007) was a Finnish psychotherapist and politician, born in Loimaa. He was a member of the Parliament of Finland from 1966 to 1972, representing the Social Democratic Party of Finland (SDP). He was a presidential elector in the 1968 Finnish presidential election.
