= Erkki Ryömä =

Finnish farmer and politician (1907–1997)

Erkki Paavo Ryömä (20 February 1907 – 4 January 1997) was a Finnish farmer and politician, born in Karkku. He was a member of the Parliament of Finland from 1955 to 1958 and again from 1962 to 1966, representing the Agrarian League, which changed its name to Centre Party in 1965. He was a presidential elector in the 1956, 1962 and 1968 presidential elections. Erkki Ryömä was a nephew of Hannes Ryömä and a cousin of Mauri Ryömä
