= Fanny Ahlfors =

Finnish politician (1884–1947)

Fanny Augusta Ahlfors
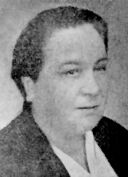
- Born: March 21, 1884
- Died: January 13, 1947 (aged 62)
- Occupation: Social Democratic politician.

Fanny Augusta Ahlfors (March 21, 1884 – January 13, 1947) was a Finnish Social Democratic politician. She was a member of the Parliament of Finland between 1919–27 and 1930–33 from the constituency of Turku Province North. Ahlfors was also a member of the electoral college for selecting the President of Finland in 1925 and 1931. She was born and died in Pori.
