= Nestori Aronen =

Finnish sawmill worker, trade union functionary, politician

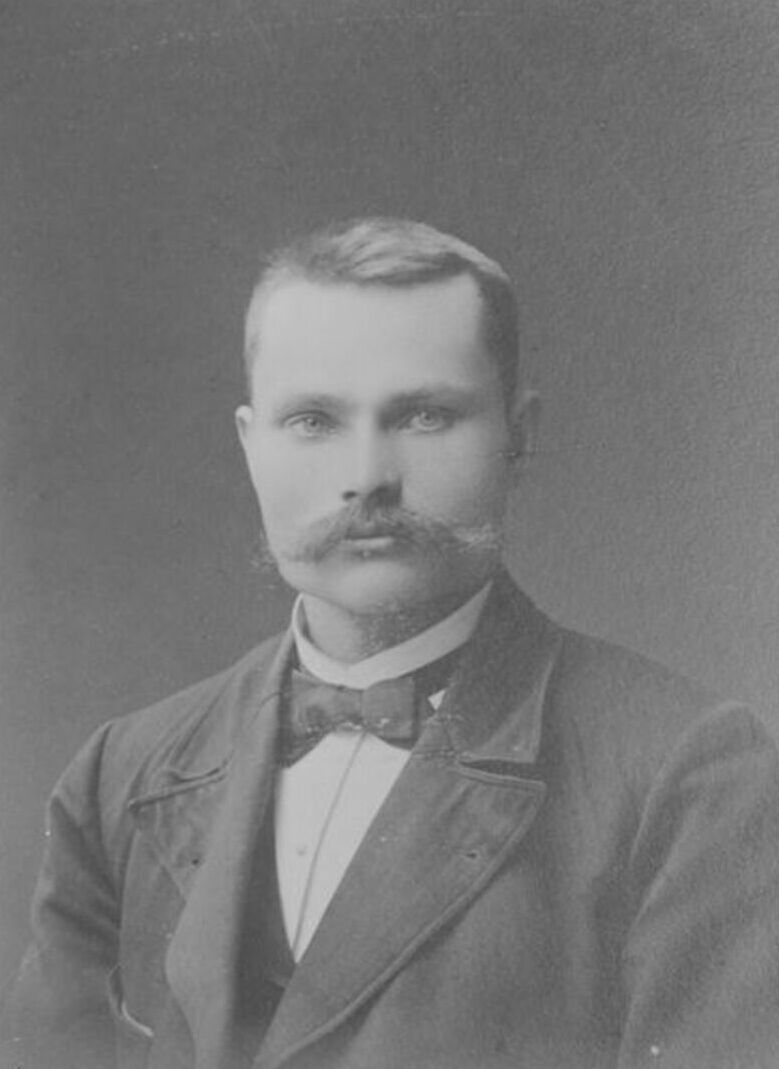
- Nestori Aronen during his years as a Member of Parliament
- Born: 27 December 1876; Pori, Finland
- Died: 7 October 1954 (aged 77)
- Other name: Johan Nestor (Nestori) Aronen
- Occupations: sawmill worker, trade union functionary, politician
- Known for: member, Parliament of Finland (1909–1918)
- Political party: Social Democratic Party of Finland (SDP)

Johan Nestor (Nestori) Aronen (27 December 1876 – 7 October 1954) was a Finnish sawmill worker, trade union functionary and politician, born in Pori. He was a member of the Parliament of Finland from 1909 to 1918, representing the Social Democratic Party of Finland (SDP). He was imprisoned in 1918 for having sided with the Reds during the Finnish Civil War.
