= Wilho Laine =

Finnish politician

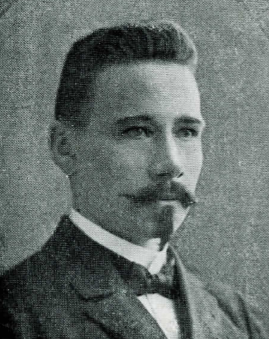
Finnish Member of the Parliament Wilho Laine (1875–1918).

Isak Wilho Laine (5 July 1875 – 21 May 1918; original surname Kivelä) was a Finnish carpenter and politician, born in Köyliö. He was a member of the Parliament of Finland from 1907 to 1908 and again from 1910 to 1913, representing the Social Democratic Party of Finland (SDP). During the Finnish Civil War he sided with the Reds, was made prisoner by White troops and shot in Hämeenlinna on 21 May 1918.
