= Edvard Hannula =

Finnish priest and politician

Edvard Hannula (23 March 1859 in Nakkila – 11 March 1931) was a Finnish Lutheran clergyman and politician. He was a member of the Diet of Finland in 1897, 1899, 1900, 1904–1905 and 1905–1906 and of the Parliament of Finland from 1909 to 1913 and from 1919 to 1922. He belonged to the Young Finnish Party until 1918 and to the National Coalition Party thereafter.
