= Kalle Soini =

Finnish politician

Kalle Ahti Soini (13 February 1884 – 24 May 1946) was a Finnish agronomist and politician, born in Mouhijärvi. He was a Member of the Parliament of Finland from 1933 to 1945, representing the National Coalition Party.
