= Juho Hakkinen =

Finnish politician (1872–1918)

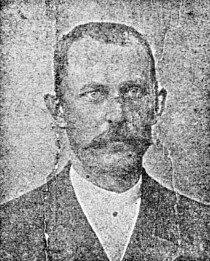
J. V. Hakkinen

Juho Villehard Hakkinen (4 April 1872 - May 1918) was a Finnish blacksmith and politician, born in Korpilahti. He was a member of the Parliament of Finland from 1916 to 1918, representing the Social Democratic Party of Finland (SDP). He sided with the Reds during the Finnish Civil War, was made prisoner and shot in Viipuri in May 1918.
