= Mikko Latva =

Finnish schoolteacher and politician (1870–1934)

Mikko Latva (14 April 1870 – 20 July 1934) was a Finnish schoolteacher and politician, born in Laihia. He was a member of the Diet of Finland from 1905 to 1906 and of the Parliament of Finland from 1908 to 1909 and from 1913 to 1916, representing the Young Finnish Party.
