= Eino Heikura =

Finnish farmer and politician (1893–1962)

Eino Emil Heikura
- Born: October 18, 1893; Nurmes, Finland
- Died: March 19, 1962; Finland
- Occupation(s): Farmer, politician
- Known for: Presidential elector in 1950 and 1956
- Office: Member of the Parliament of Finland

Eino Emil (Eino E.) Heikura (18 October 1893 – 19 March 1962) was a Finnish farmer and politician, born in Nurmes. He was a member of the Parliament of Finland from 1924 to 1927 and from 1951 to 1958, representing the Agrarian League. He was a presidential elector in the 1950 and 1956 presidential elections.
