= Veijo Puhjo =

Finnish politician (1948–2019)

Veijo Olavi Puhjo
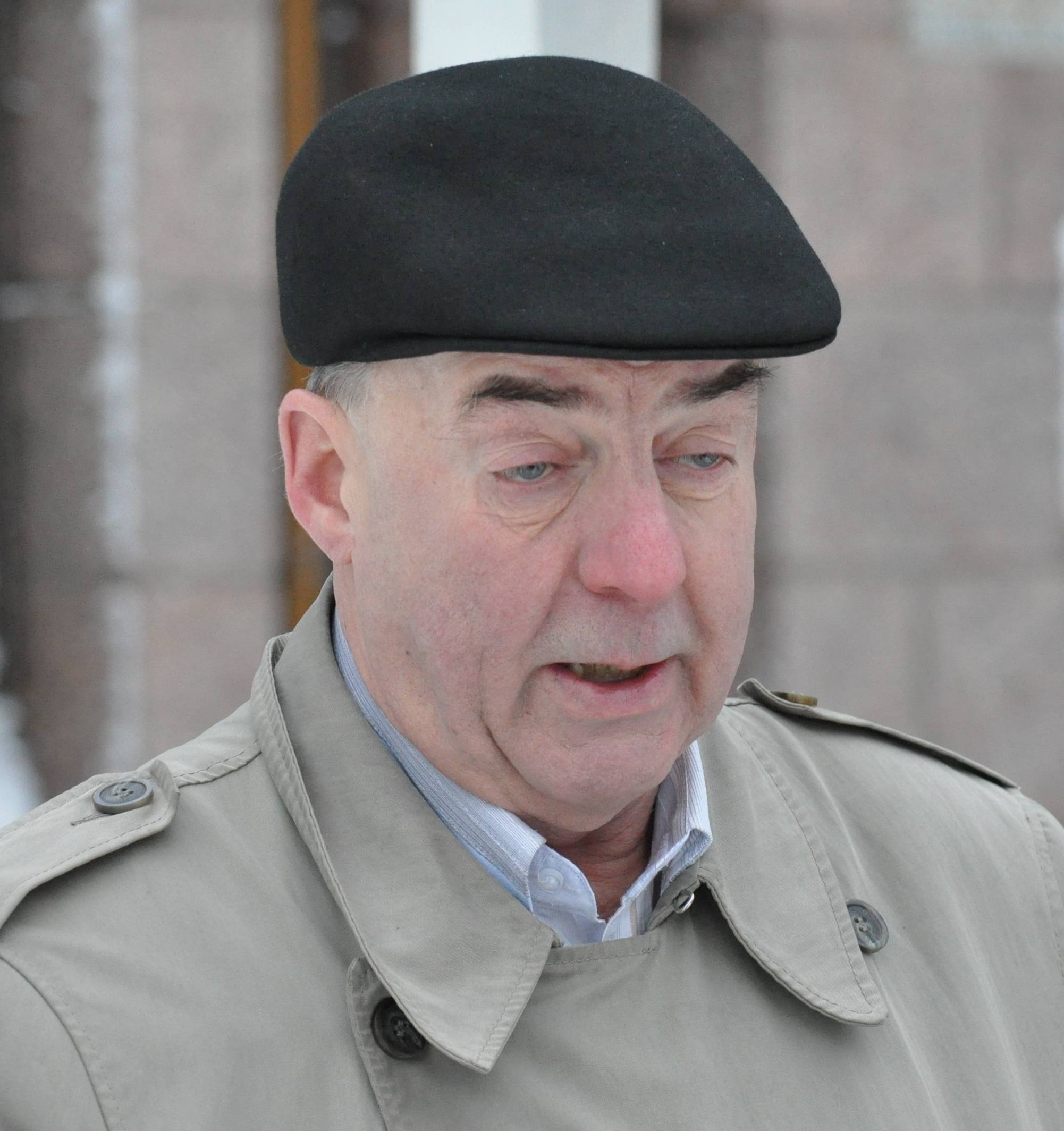
- Veijo Puhjo in 2012

Member of the Parliament of Finland
- In office 24 March 1995 – 19 April 2011

Personal details
- Born: 26 June 1948 Loimaa, Finland
- Died: 9 December 2019 (aged 71) Pori, Finland
- Party: Left Alliance
- Profession: Physician

Veijo Olavi Puhjo (26 June 1948 – 9 December 2019) was a Finnish politician who was a member of Finnish Parliament, representing the Left Alliance. He was elected to the parliament in 1995 and left after the 2011 election. Puhjo was a physician by profession. He graduated from the Greifswald Medical School of the University of Greifswald in Germany.
