= Walto Tuomioja =

Finnish lawyer, journalist and politician

Walto Wihtori Tuomioja (7 March 1888, in Parkano – 2 October 1931) was a Finnish lawyer, journalist and politician. At first active in the Young Finnish Party, he was a member of the Parliament of Finland from 1924 to 1929 and again from 1930 until his death in 1931, representing the National Progressive Party. Tuomioja was the editor of Helsingin Sanomat from 1927 to 1931. He was the father of Sakari Tuomioja and the grandfather of Erkki Tuomioja.
