= Taave Junnila =

Finnish politician (1869–1943)

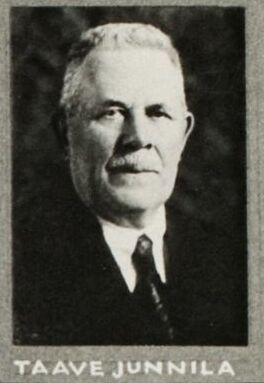
Image of Taave Junnila

Taavetti (Taave) Ananias Junnila (27 March 1869 – 29 January 1943; surname until 1890 Yli-Maakala) was a Finnish farmer, bank director and politician, born in Mouhijärvi. He was a member of the Parliament of Finland, representing the Finnish Party from 1908 to 1913 and the National Coalition Party from 1922 to 1936.
