= Paavo Aarniokoski =

Finnish politician

Paavo Paatrikki Aarniokoski (5 April 1893 – 17 October 1961) was a Finnish farmer and politician, born in Kankaanpää. He was a member of the Parliament of Finland from 1933 to 1945, representing the Social Democratic Party of Finland (SDP).
