= Hinnerjoki =

- Former municipality
- Hinnerjoen kunta Hinnerjoki kommun
- Coat of arms

- Location within Finland
- Coordinates: 60.995949°N 21.990813°E
- Country: Finland
- Region: Satakunta
- Municipality: 1864
- Consolidated: 1970

Area
  - Land: 1,156 km^{2} (446 sq mi)

Population (1969)
  - Total: 1,469
  - Density: 1.271/km^{2} (3.291/sq mi)
- Time zone: UTC+2 (EET)
  - Summer (DST): UTC+3 (EEST)
- Climate: Dfc

Hinnerjoki is a former municipality in the Satakunta province, Finland. It was consolidated with Eura in 1970. The village of Hinnerjoki is listed as a Cultural environment of national significance by the Finnish National Board of Antiquities.

Hinnerjoki is the birthplace of the DJ and record producer Darude, known for his 1998 hit single Sandstorm.
