= Sulho Leppä =

Finnish politician (1878–1918)

Sulho Richard Leppä (7 February 1878 – 5 October 1918; former surnames Leppänen and Leppijärvi) was a Finnish politician, born in Porin maalaiskunta. He was a member of the Parliament of Finland from 1916 to 1917, representing the Social Democratic Party of Finland (SDP). During the Finnish Civil War, he worked in the administration of the Finnish Socialist Workers' Republic. After the defeat of the Red side, he went into exile in Soviet Russia. He joined the Communist Party of Finland (SKP), founded in Moscow by political exiles on 29 August 1918. He died of a liver disease in Petrograd on 5 October 1918.
