= Kalle Hakala =

Finnish politician (1880–1947)

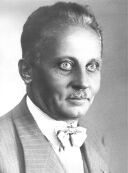

Member of the Parliament of Finland
- In office 22 October 1934 – 16 May 1947
- Preceded by: Oskari Salonen
- Succeeded by: Antti Tossavainen
- Constituency: Mikkeli Province
- In office 1 May 1924 – 31 August 1933
- Constituency: Mikkeli Province
- In office 1 February 1911 – 16 May 1918
- Succeeded by: Elli Laurila
- Constituency: Mikkeli Province

Personal details
- Born: Karl Juhonpoika Hakala; 18 March 1880 Lempäälä, Russian Empire
- Died: 16 May 1947 (aged 67) Mikkeli, Finland
- Party: Social Democratic Party of Finland
- Occupation: Newspaper editor

Kalle Juhonpoika Hakala (18 March 1880 – 16 May 1947) was a Finnish newspaper editor, politician and member of the Parliament of Finland, the national legislature of Finland. A member of the Social Democratic Party (SDP), he represented Mikkeli Province between October 1934 and May 1947. He had previously represented Mikkeli Province from February 1911 to May 1918 and from May 1924 to August 1933. He was imprisoned for a year following the end of the Finnish Civil War.

== Early life ==
Hakala was born on 18 March 1880 in Lempäälä in the south-west of the Grand Duchy of Finland. He was the son of farmworker Juha Hakala and Wilhelmina Myllymäki. He was a machinist (1897-1907) and editor of the Vapaus newspaper in Mikkeli (1907-1918).

== Politics, civil war and imprisonment ==
Hakala was elected to the Parliament of Finland at the 1911 parliamentary election. He was re-elected at the 1913, 1916 and 1917 parliamentary elections.

Following the Finnish Revolution, Hakala was elected to the Central Workers' Council of Finland, the legislature of the Finnish Socialist Workers' Republic (the Reds), in February 1918. He was secretary of the revolutionary government's agriculture department.

In early May 1918 the Whites published a list of leaders of the "Red Rebellion" (the failed Finnish Revolution) which included 37 SDP MPs: Hakala was included on the list due to his membership of the Central Workers' Council. On 14 May 1918 White prosecutor Immi Savonius announded that 56 SDP MPs, including Hakala, would be charged with treason and ordered their arrest.

On 12 October 1918 the 28th Department of the State Criminal Court (Valtiorikosoikeus) handed down sentences to 40 SDP MPs for treason and high treason. Hakala was found guilty of assisting treason and high treason and sentenced to eight years imprisonment and lost his civic rights for ten years. In January 1919 the Appellate Court of the State Criminal Court confirmed the sentence handed down against Hakala by the 28th Department.

Hakala was amongst twelve SDP MPs who were pardoned by Regent Carl Gustaf Emil Mannerheim on 19 June 1919 as they did not take an active part in the rebellion. He was released from Sörnäinen Prison on Midsummer Eve 1919.

== Return to politics ==
Hakala was literary editor of the Työväe co-operative in Mikkeli from 1921 to 1925. He was editor-in-chief of Vapaus from 1933 to 1947. He was re-elected to the Parliament of Finland at the 1924 parliamentary election. He was re-elected at the 1927, 1929 and 1930 parliamentary elections. He was not re-elected at the 1933 parliamentary election but in October 1934 replaced Oskari Salonen in Parliament. He was re-elected at the 1936, 1939 and 1945 parliamentary elections.

Hakala was a presidential elector at the 1931, 1937, 1940 and 1943 presidential elections. He was a member of Mikkeli City Council. Following the defeat of Finland by the Allies in the Continuation War, Hakala was one of the twelve parliament appointed tribunal judges of the war crimes trials of the war-time political leaders of Finland. Eleven out of the fifteen members of the tribunal, including Hakala, voted to convict the defendants in February 1946.

Hakala died on 16 May 1947 in Mikkeli after a long illness.

== Personal life ==
Hakala was married to Alma Maria Purhonen from 1911 to 1927 and to Aliina Partti from 1928.

== See also ==
- List of Finnish MPs imprisoned for political reasons
