= Isak Penttala =

Finnish politician (1883–1955)

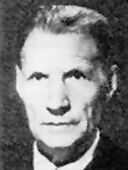

Member of the Parliament of Finland
- In office 4 March 1927 – 20 July 1951
- Preceded by: Kaarlo Saari
- Constituency: Vaasa Province South

Personal details
- Born: 8 February 1883 Isokyrö, Russian Empire
- Died: 28 February 1955 (aged 72) Seinäjoki, Finland
- Party: Social Democratic Party of Finland
- Occupation: Newspaper editor

Isak Penttala (8 February 1883 – 28 February 1955) was a Finnish newspaper editor, politician and member of the Parliament of Finland, the national legislature of Finland. A member of the Social Democratic Party, he represented Vaasa Province South between March 1927 and July 1951. Prior to being elected, he was imprisoned for political reasons during and following the Finnish Civil War.

== Early life ==
Penttala was born on 8 February 1883 in Isokyrö in the west of the Grand Duchy of Finland. He was the son of crofter Juho Penttala and Maria Holkko. He studied at public school, Work People's College in Duluth, Minnesota (1911-1912) and Social Democratic Party (SDP) college in Helsinki (1913).

As a teenager Penttala migrated to the USA where he held various jobs between 1902 and 1913: in an iron factory, in a sawmill, in a coal mine, as a fisherman, as a writer for the Toveri magazine and as an agent for the magazine in the western states.

== Politics ==
Penttala was the secretary of the Vaasa Province South branch of the SDP from 1916 to 1917. He was amongst tens of thousands of leftists who were imprisoned in concentration camps for political reasons by the Whites during and following the Finnish Civil War. Penttala was arrested by the Whites in February 1918 and after interrogation had been recommended for release by Inspector I. W. Markus but the White prosecutors refused. Eventually, after he was produced before the courts, he was released by the state criminal court in Vaasa on 28 November 1918. Following his release, he served as editor of several SDP newspapers: Työläinen (Vaasa, 1919), Kansan Lehti (Tampere, 1920), Raivaaja (Vaasa, 1921, 1924–1926), Vapaus (Mikkeli, 1924) and Pohjanmaan Kansa (Vaasa, 1931). He was a farmer in Isossakyrö from 1920 to 1924.

Penttala was appointed to the Parliament of Finland in March 1927 following the death of Kaarlo Saari. He was re-elected at the 1927, 1929, 1930, 1933, 1936, 1939, 1945, and 1948 parliamentary elections. He was a presidential elector at the 1931, 1937, 1940 and 1943 presidential elections. He was a member of the municipal councils in Isokyrö and Seinäjoki.

Penttala died on 28 February 1955 in Seinäjoki.

== Personal life ==
Penttala married Sanna Matilda Heikkilä in 1918.

== See also ==
- List of Finnish MPs imprisoned for political reasons
