= Väinö Kivisalo =

Finnish politician (1882–1953)

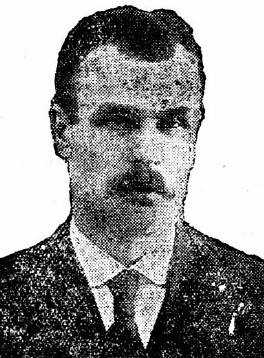

Member of the Parliament of Finland
- In office 1 August 1929 – 21 July 1948
- Constituency: Häme Province South

Governor of Häme Province
- In office 14 February 1918 – April 1918
- Preceded by: K. A. Saarinen
- Succeeded by: Theodor Lilius

Personal details
- Born: Väinö Paavi; 18 October 1882 Karkku, Russian Empire
- Died: 29 March 1953 (aged 70) Helsinki, Finland
- Party: Social Democratic Party of Finland

Väinö Kivisalo (18 October 1882 – 29 March 1953) was a Finnish politician and member of the Parliament of Finland, the national legislature of Finland. A member of the Social Democratic Party, he represented Häme Province South between August 1929 and July 1948. Prior to being elected, he was imprisoned for political reasons following the Finnish Civil War.

== Early life ==
Kivisalo was born on 18 October 1882 in Karkku in the south-east of the Grand Duchy of Finland and was the son of a farmer. When he was 14 years old his father died following which the family were evicted from their homestead by the owner.

Kivisalo was a farmworker in Karkku and a labourer in several places including Suoniemi, Akaa, Urjala, Hattula and Vanaja. He was also a factory worker in Tampere. He moved to Hämeenlinna in 1904 where he worked in a sawmill for several years.

== Politics ==
Kivisalo joined the Social Democratic Party (SDP) in Urjala in 1903. He was also active in the labour and temperance movements. He was the secretary of the Häme Province South branch of the SDP from 1914 to 1918.

Following the Finnish Revolution he was appointed Governor of Häme Province for the revolutionary government. He was amongst tens of thousands of leftists who were imprisoned in concentration camps for political reasons by the Whites following their victory in the Finnish Civil War. In August 1918 the State Criminal Court (Valtiorikosoikeus) in Riihimäki sentenced Kivisalo to 12 years in prison and loss of civic rights for 15 years for treason and high treason. He was released from Sukeva concentration camp on 28 December 1921.

Kivisalo was the secretary of the Häme Province North branch of the SDP from 1923 to 1925 and of the Häme Province South branch from 1925 to 1929. He was elected to the Parliament of Finland at the 1929 parliamentary election. He was re-elected at the 1930, 1933, 1936, 1939 and 1945 parliamentary elections.

Kivisalo was a presidential elector at the 1931, 1937, 1940 and 1943 presidential elections. He represented Finland at the Labour and Socialist International's congress in Brussels in 1928. He was a member of the municipal council in Hämeenlinna for many years. He was president of the Christian Social Democratic Union (Kristillinen sosialidemokraattinen liitto) and was a board member of the Helsinki Workers' Savings Bank.

Kivisalo died on 29 March 1953 in Helsinki.

== Works ==
- Maatalous sosialismin vallitessa. Hämeenlinna, Finland: Hämeen eteläisen vaalipiirin sosialidemokraattien piiritoimikunta. 1917.
- Lasten kotikasvatus : työläisvanhempain ja nuorison käteen ja sydämeen. Hämeenlinna, Finland: Etelä-Hämeen sosialidemokraattien piiritoimikunta. 1922.
- Kristillisyys ja sosialidemokratia. Tampere, Finland: Hämeen läänin pohjoisen vaalipiirin sosialidemokraattien piiritoimikunta. 1924.
- Sosialismin voiton välttämättömyys : esitetty lyhyissä väitelmissä. Hämeenlinna, Finland: Hämeenkansan kp. 1924.
- Jo herää työläiskansa!. Hämeenlinna, Finland: Hämeenkansan kp. 1927.
- Onko työväen voitto varma?. Hämeenlinna, Finland: Hämeenkansan kp. 1927.
- Hämeen jättiläinen. 1939–1941.
- Rakentavan työn päivänä. Hämeenlinna, Finland: Hämeen eteläisen sosialidemokraattien piiritoimikunta. 1945.
- Yhteiskuntaelämä kristilliseksi. Helsinki, Finland: Tammi. 1946.
- Työkansa tuliliemen tuttavana. Helsinki, Finland: Raittiusjärjestöjen yhteistoimikunta. 1947.
- Kristinusko ja työväenliike. Helsinki, Finland: S.l. 1948.
- Kristilliset piirit ja sosialidemokratia. Helsinki, Finland. 1950.

== See also ==
- List of Finnish MPs imprisoned for political reasons
