= Kaino Oksanen =

Finnish educationalist and politician

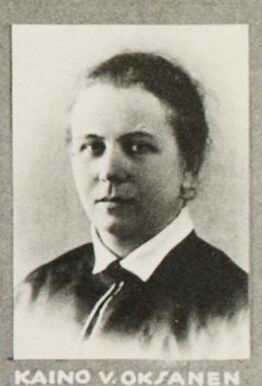

Member of Parliament of Finland
- In office 2 September 1927 – 31 August 1939
- Parliamentary group: National Coalition
- Constituency: Viipuri Province (West)

Personal details
- Born: 28 December 1884 Tampere, Grand Duchy of Finland
- Died: 12 October 1966 (aged 81) Jyväskylä, Finland
- Party: National Coalition Party
- Education: Doctor of Philosophy
- Profession: Teacher, Pedagogue, Meteorologist

Kaino Oksanen (1884—1966) was a Finnish politician, educationalist and meteorologist.

== Early life and education ==
Kaino Wilhelmiina Oksanen was born in Tampere, to Chaplain (later Provost) Oskar Oksanen and Wilhelmina née Blom.

She finished secondary school in 1904 and continued to university, graduating with a bachelor's degree in 1911, Master's in 1913, and PhD in 1919. She was the first woman to gain a Doctorate in education from a Finnish university.

== Career ==
=== Teaching ===
Kaino Oksanen began working as a teacher of mathematics and physics already during her own university studies in 1910, and carried on teaching at schools in Vyborg and Helsinki until 1917. After that, she taught geography briefly, until 1919.

Having obtained her PhD in education, Oksanen lectured in psychology and pedagogy at the Helsinki women's further education college (Helsingin suomalainen jatko-opisto; effectively a teacher training college), from 1919 until 1929.

=== Meteorology ===
Oksanen worked, alongside her other duties, in research and administrative roles at what is now the Finnish Meteorological Institute from 1912 until 1949.

She also wrote a textbook used in meteorological education, published in 1917.

=== Politics ===
In the 1927 general election, Oksanen was elected as a Member of Parliament from the Viipuri Province West constituency, representing the National Coalition Party (Kokoomus). She retained her seat four times, in the 1929, 1930, 1933 and 1936 elections.

She was also a member of the Electoral College of the 1931 Finnish presidential election, helping to elect the National Coalition Party candidate Pehr Evind Svinhufvud as the 3rd President of Finland.

=== Other ===
Oksanen chaired the Finnish Federation of Graduate Women in 1926–1927.

She also served as a board member of the national women's rights organisation Suomen Naisyhdistys.
