= Sigrid Oulasmaa =

Finnish politician (1898–1963)

Sigrid Elviira Oulasmaa (13 October 1898 – 2 August 1963; née Salovaara) was a Finnish politician. She was born in Humppila, and was a Member of the Parliament of Finland from 1933 to 1936, representing the Small Farmers' Party of Finland.
