= Heikki Niskanen =

Finnish politician

Heikki Niskanen (28 August 1896 – 16 June 1962) was a Finnish farmer and politician, born in Nivala. He was a Member of the Parliament of Finland, representing the People's Party from 1933 to 1936, the Small Farmers Party from 1936 to 1941 and the Agrarian League from 1941 to 1945.
