= Kaarlo Saari =

Finnish politician

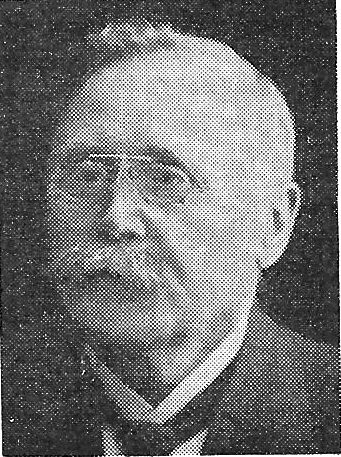

Kaarlo Saari (born 20 June 1857) was a Finnish teacher and politician who served as a member of the Eduskunta from 1910-1918 and from 1924-1927. Saari was a member of the Social Democratic Party of Finland (SDP).

== Life ==
Saari's father was the blacksmith Karl Lystman (born 1827), and his mother was Vilhelmiina Mäkelä (born 1832). Saari worked for his father as an assistant until, at age 18, he left for training as an organist and sexton at Kalanti. Saari also completed his primary education at the local school, after which he spent a year at the Real school in Uusikaupunki. In 1878, Saari began to study at the seminary of Jyväskylä, from which he graduated as a primary school teacher in 1882. The following summer, Saari enrolled in a trade program at the Trade Seminary of Näsi in Lerum, Sweden.

In the autumn of 1883, Saari began to work as a primary school teacher in Kurikka, in which he worked first in the local primary school and, beginning in 1909, in the primary school at Polvenkylä. In addition, Saari worked as the cantor of Kurikka until 1912. Saari was also active politically. Saari was a member of the Kurikka municipal council and worked, amongst other things, as the Director of the Board of Trustees beginning in 1900. In 1894, Saari contributed to the founding of the Kurikka Youth Association, and in 1903 he founded the Kurikka Craft Workers' Credit Union. The purpose of the Credit Union was to support modern cottage industry. Saari managed the Credit Unoin until 1917, at which point it became a limited liability company.

Saari began to work with the labor movement following the November 1905 general strike. In 1906, Saari founded the Kurikka Workers' Association, in which he acted as chairman between 1908 and 1909. Saari won his first parliamentary election in 1910.When the Eduskunta was dissolved in August 1917, Saari participated in the meetings of the so-called Mainland Parliament. After the breakout of the Finnish Civil War, in January 1918 Saari left to join the Finnish People's Delegation, but he did not support violent revolt. He worked as a secretary of the Kouluhallitus, established to replace the earlier School Council, with a responsibility for questions regarding teachers' salaries. At the beginning of April 1918, Saari moved, along with the rest of the Finnish People's Delegation, to Viipuri. On May 5th, Saari was captured during the Battle of Viipuri. Saari was initially imprisoned at the Viipuri prison camp, from which he was moved, after about two weeks, to Helsinki. In October, Saari received a six-year prison sentence for treason. He was granted a presidential pardon in late August of 1919.

Saari was reelected to the Eduskunta in 1924. He died of heart failure at home in Helsinki. He died during the election season in January in 1927. Saari is buried at the Kurikka Cemetery. Isak Penttala succeeded him in the Eduskunta.

== Family ==
Saari's first wife was Naima Matilda Heidenberg. Heidenberg (1867-1920) was born in Kokkola. Saari and Heidenberg were divorced in 1887. The couple had seven children, from which the most well-known are the businesspeople Armas Saari, Eero Saari, and Yrjö Saari. In 1922, Saari married the sister of his first wife, Helmi Hildur Heidenberg (1869-1931). The sisters' father was the Swedish-born shopkeeper Gustaf Napoleon Bernadotte Heidenberg (1836-1915).
