= 1939 Finnish parliamentary election =

General election

← 1936	1–2 July 1939	1945 →

All 200 seats in the Parliament of Finland 101 seats needed for a majority
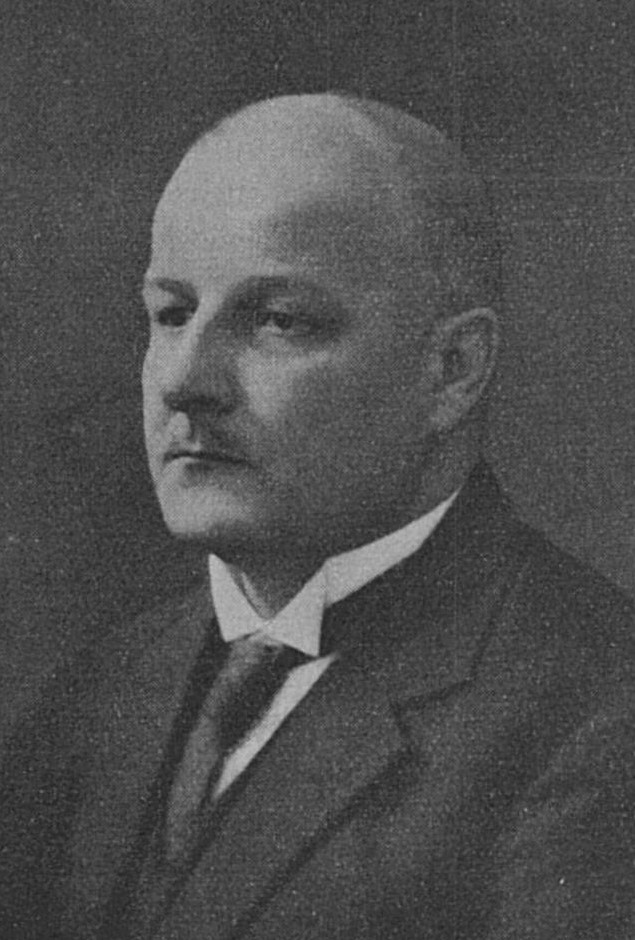

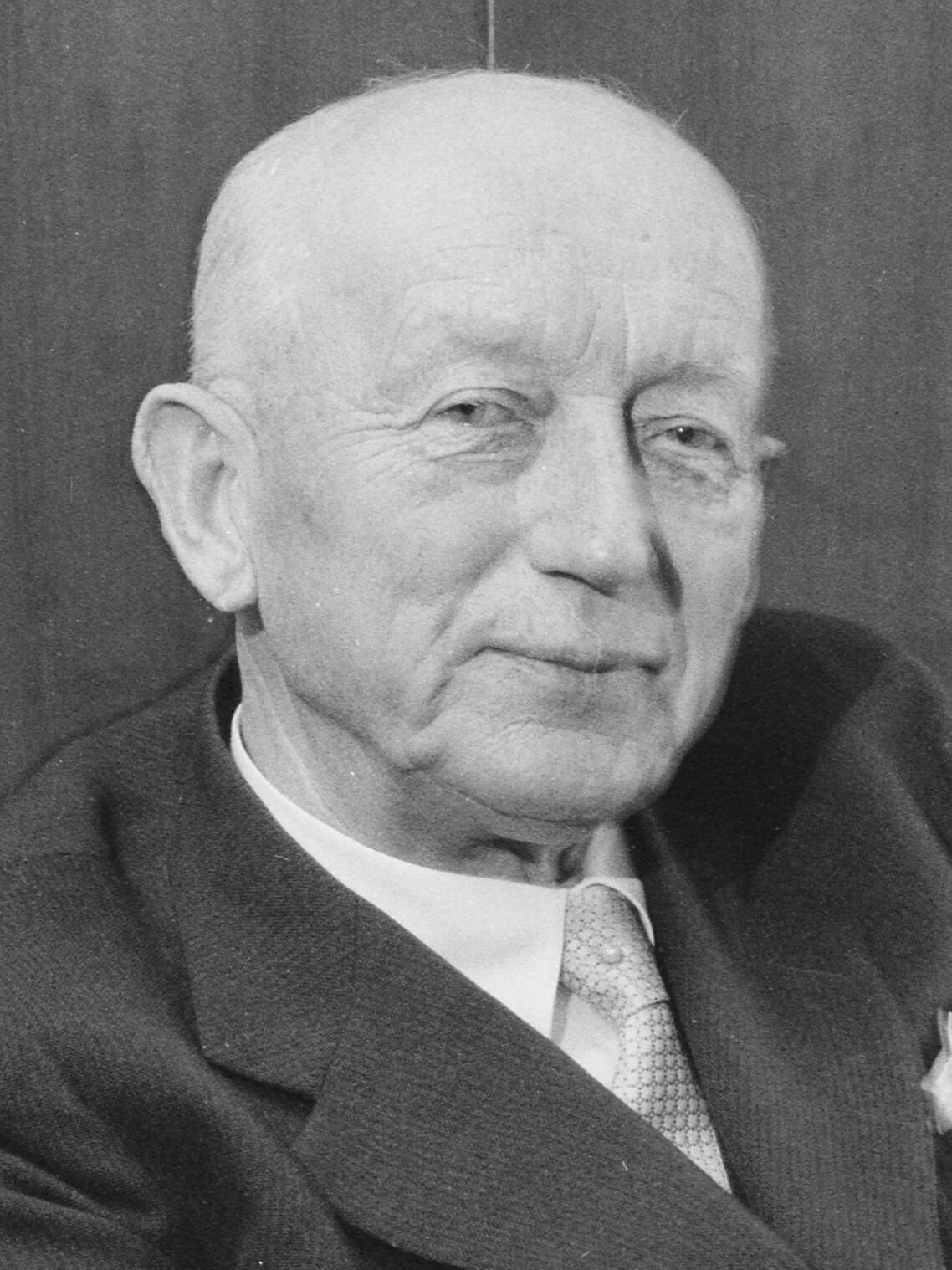

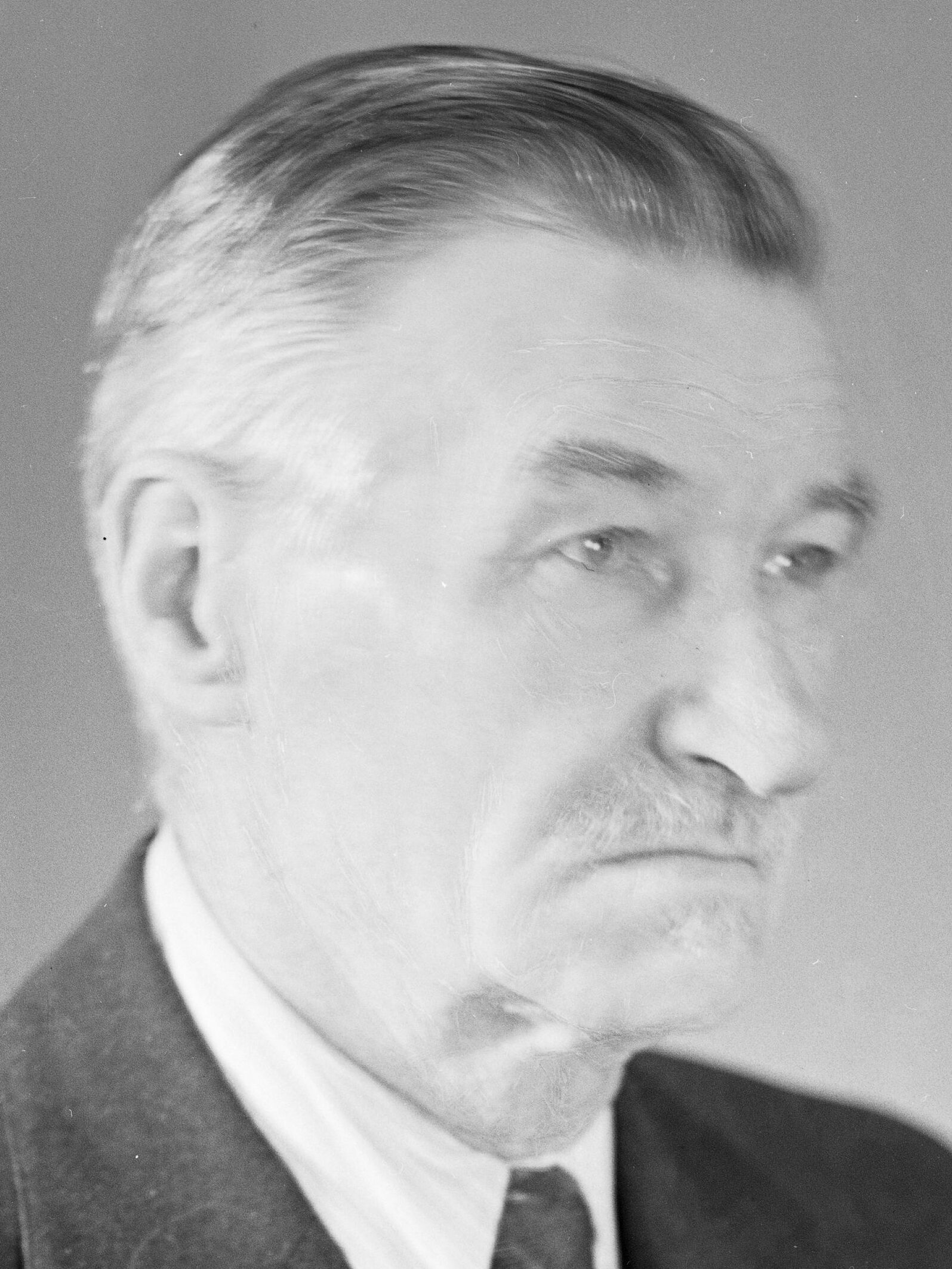

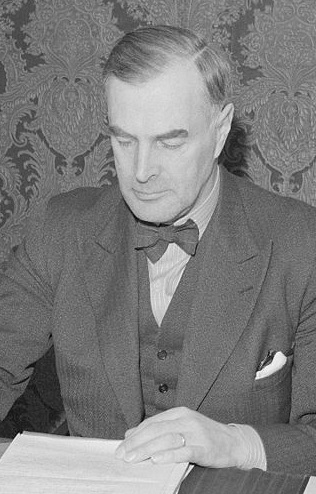

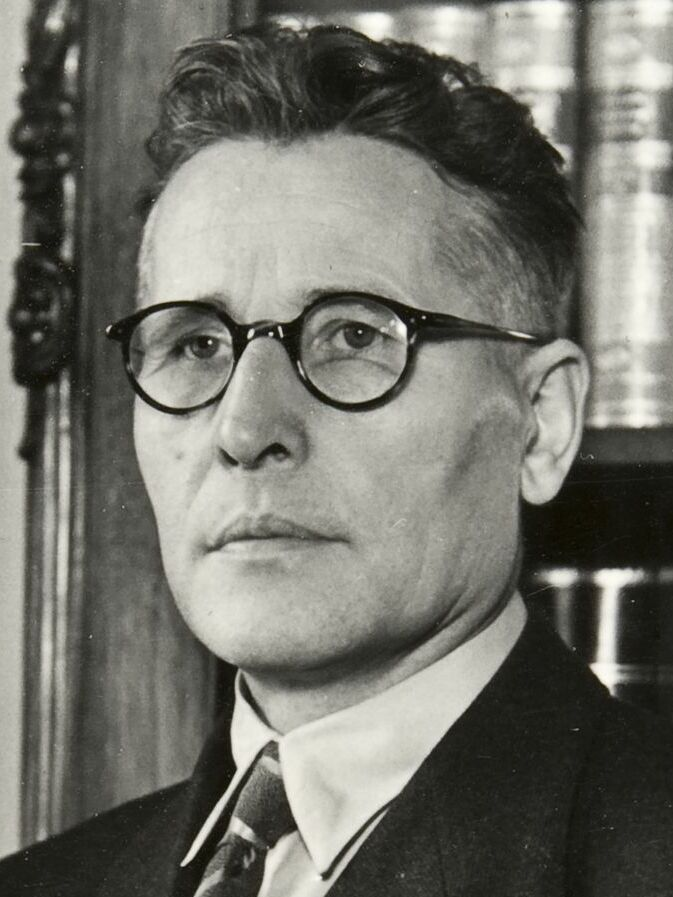

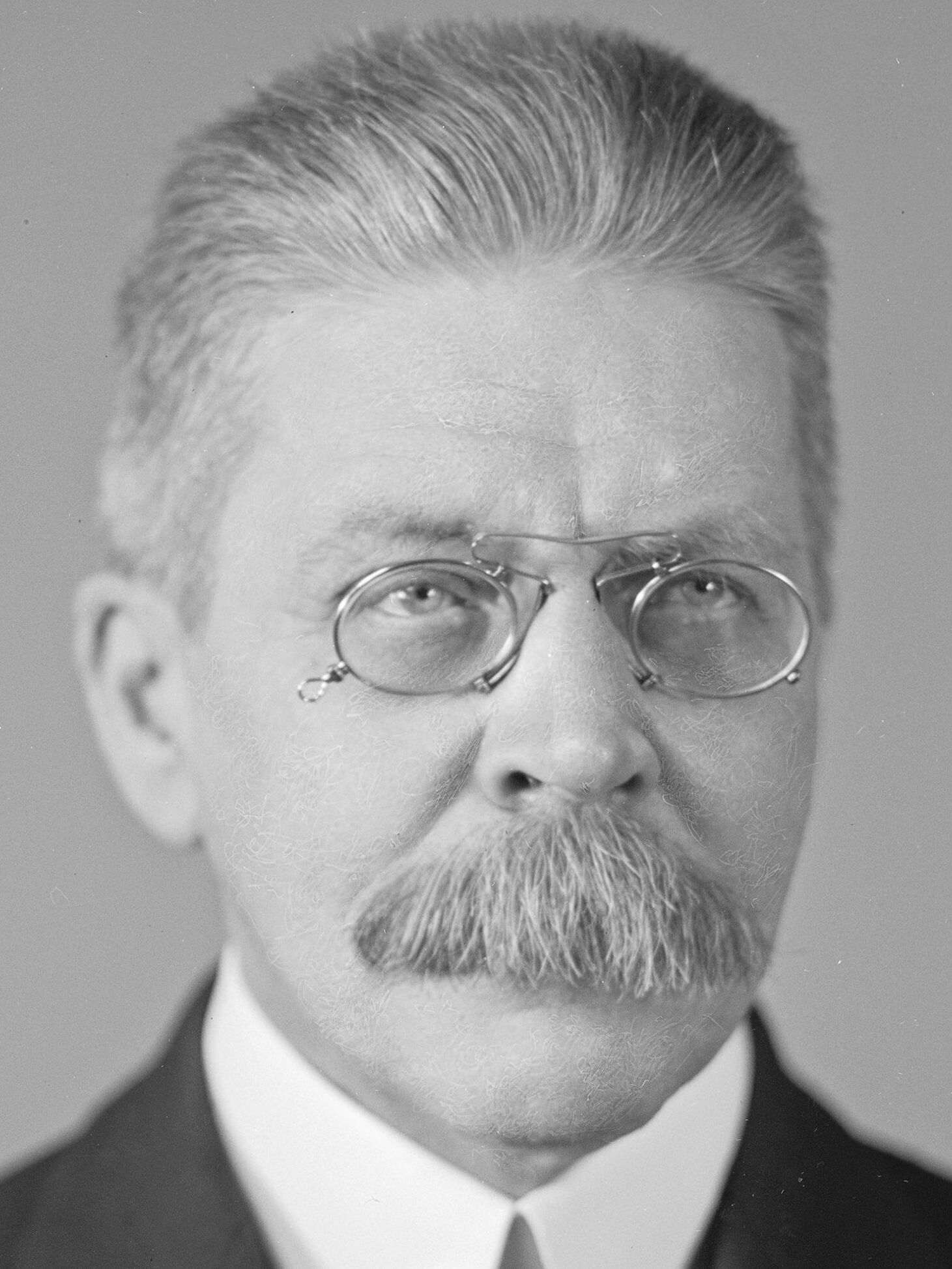
	First party	Second party	Third party
Leader	Kaarlo Harvala	Pekka Heikkinen	Pekka Pennanen
Party	SDP	Agrarian	National Coalition
Last election	83 seats, 38.59%	53 seats, 22.41%	20 seats, 10.36%
Seats won	85	56	25
Seat change	▲2	▲3	▲5
Popular vote	515,980	296,529	176,215
Percentage	39.77%	22.86%	13.58%
Swing	▲1.18pp	▲0.45pp	▲3.22pp
	Fourth party	Fifth party	Sixth party
Leader	Ernst von Born	Vilho Annala	Aimo Cajander
Party	RKP	IKL	National Progressive
Last election	21 seats, 11.20%	14 seats, 8.34%	7 seats, 6.28%
Seats won	18	8	6
Seat change	▼3	▼6	▼1
Popular vote	124,720	86,219	62,387
Percentage	9.61%	6.68%	4.81%
Swing	▼1.59pp	▼1.66pp	▼1.47pp
	Seventh party
Party	Party of Smallholders and Rural People
Last election	2 seats, 2.60%
Seats won	2
Seat change	0
Popular vote	27,783
Percentage	2.14%
Swing	▼0.46pp
Prime Minister before election
Aimo Cajander
National Progressive
Prime Minister after election
Aimo Cajander
National Progressive

Parliamentary elections were held in Finland on 1 and 2 July 1939. Following the elections, the National Progressive Party-led government of Aimo Cajander continued in office. However, he was replaced by Risto Ryti's Progressive-led war government in December 1939.

== Background ==
The leading issues were the distribution of the growing prosperity's benefits, the prospects for the centre-left coalition government's continuation, the right-wing opposition's criticism of the government's numerous and allegedly poorly prepared legislative proposals, and the Finnish national security under the threat of World War II. Prime Minister Cajander opposed the notable increase of defence spending before the elections, because that would require raising taxes. Finance Minister Väinö Tanner and Governor of the Bank of Finland, Risto Ryti, opposed the taking of a foreign loan to buy modern military equipment for the Finnish army, although the Finnish national debt in 1939 was among the lowest in the Western world. Most Finnish voters were apparently satisfied with the centre-left Cajander government's performance, because it received almost three-quarters of the seats. The voter turnout was the highest of the Finnish parliamentary elections of the 1920s and 1930s.

== Results ==
Party	Votes	%	Seats	+/–
Social Democratic Party	515,980	39.77	85	+2
Agrarian League	296,529	22.86	56	+3
National Coalition Party	176,215	13.58	25	+5
Swedish People's Party	124,720	9.61	18	–3
Patriotic People's Movement	86,219	6.65	8	–6
National Progressive Party	62,387	4.81	6	–1
Party of Smallholders and Rural People	27,783	2.14	2	0
Swedish Left	5,980	0.46	0	0
Others	1,506	0.12	0	–
Total	1,297,319	100.00	200	0
Valid votes	1,297,319	99.61		
Invalid/blank votes	5,029	0.39		
Total votes	1,302,348	100.00		
Registered voters/turnout	1,956,807	66.55		
Source: Tilastokeskus 2004
