= National Progressive Party (Finland) =

National Progressive Party Kansallinen Edistyspuolue
- Founded: 8 December 1918
- Dissolved: 1951
- Split from: Young Finnish Party
- Succeeded by: People's Party of Finland
- Ideology: Social liberalism Republicanism
- Political position: Centre to centre-left
- International affiliation: Liberal International

The National Progressive Party (Finnish: Kansallinen Edistyspuolue; Swedish: Framstegspartiet) was a liberal political party in Finland from 1918 to 1951. The party was founded 8 December 1918, after the Finnish Civil War, by the republican majority of the Young Finnish Party and the republican minority of the Finnish Party (the next day the monarchists of both parties founded the National Coalition Party.)

In December 1918, the National Progressive Party adopted a social liberal programme that contained a wide range of progressive proposals. Amongst others, these included land reform, state job creation work and unemployment schemes, state participation in the provision of housing-building schemes and compulsory sickness insurance pensions, legislation guaranteeing contracts, conditions of work and a minimum wage, and a progressive income and wealth tax to pay for this social reform programme. As noted by one study, “The spirit of the NPP’s programme, in short, was clearly that of social liberalism.” Later programmes adopted by the National Progressive Party contained a number of reformist proposals as well.

Famous members of the party included Kaarlo Juho Ståhlberg and Risto Ryti, the first and fifth Presidents of Finland, and Sakari Tuomioja.

The National Progressive Party finished its existence in early 1951, as most of its active members had joined the People's Party of Finland. A minority group including Sakari Tuomioja founded the Liberal League.

== Election results ==
Parliament of Finland
Date	Votes			Seats		Position	Size
Date	No.	%	± pp	No.	±	Position	Size
1919	123,090	12.81	New	26 / 200	New	Coalition	4th
1922	79,676	9.21	▼3.60	15 / 200	▼11	Coalition	▼6th
1924	79,937	9.09	▼0.12	17 / 200	▲2	Coalition	6th
1927	61,613	6.77	▼2.32	10 / 200	▼7	Support	6th
1929	53,301	5.60	▼1.17	7 / 200	▼3	Support	6th
1930	65,830	5.83	▲0.23	10 / 200	▲3	Coalition	▲5th
1933	82,129	7.41	▲1.58	11 / 200	▲1	Coalition	5th
1936	73,654	6.28	▼1.13	7 / 200	▼4	Coalition	▼6th
1939	62,387	4.81	▼1.47	6 / 200	▼1	Coalition	6th
1945	87,868	5.17	▲0.36	9 / 200	▲3	Coalition	6th
1948	73,444	3.91	▼1.26	5 / 200	▼4	Opposition	6th
1951	Did not run.						

== See also ==
- Liberal Party – Freedom to Choose
- Liberalism and centrism in Finland
