= Small Farmers' Party of Finland =

Defunct political party in Finland

Small Farmers' Party of Finland (Finnish: Suomen Pienviljelijäin Puolue) was a party for the farmers suffering the great depression in Finland. The party joined with two other parties in 1936 and became the Party of the Small Farmers' and the Rural People. The Small Farmers' Party of Finland was established 12 May 1929. Already, an earlier magazine entitled The Small Farmer of Finland had started its publication. The party was established earlier than planned; this was because the parliament was relieved in April 1929 and the new parliamentary elections were to be organised. The reason for this were constitutional. The Anti-Communistic laws of the protection of the republic would not have become valid without general elections and third hearing.

The Small Farmers' Party of Finland won its first parliamentary seat in 1930. This parliamentarian voted for the confirmation of the laws of the protection of the republic. Also, the party demanded rooting out the Communist movement of Finland in 1930. Later some left-wing farmers joined the party and they were welcomed. Also some radical ideas encouraged to the critique against the party suspected of helping the Communists and Russians. However the underground movement of the Communist movement of Finland has not seemed to have influence on the activities of the party. The party had about 200 local organisations and only few of them were not registered as the registered societies because of the laws of the protection of the republic.

Since 1933, there was also another similar party, the People's Party (Kansanpuolue); the latter of which had a seat in the parliament of Finland. The parties negotiated on merger for a long time, which eventually happened in 1936. The new name of the party was Party of Smallholders and Rural People. The third parliamentarian movement which joined the new party was the Central Committee of Recession Committees. Its supporters had taken part in the general elections as Pulamiesten vaaliliitto.

Finnish parliamentary elections

Year	Seats	Proportion of the electorate	
1929	--	10 154	1,08%
1930	2	20 883	1,85%
1933	3	37 544	3,39%
1936	1	23 159	1,97%

Presidential elections

Year	Electing deputies	Proportion of the electorate	
1931	2	11 772	1,41%
1937	?	13 883	1,25%

== Members of the Parliament of Finland ==
- Heikki Niskanen
  - People's Party, 1 September 1933 - 31 August 1939, could not take part in the parliamentary sessions in 1933-1934 as was imprisoned for the mutiny
  - Small Farmers Party, 1 January 1939 - 19 June 1941
  - served his term to end in the parliamentary group of Agrarian League, 20 June 1941 - 5 April 1945
- Eino Rytinki
  - Small Farmers' Party of Finland, 1 September 1933 - 31 December 1938
  - Small Farmers Party, 1 January 1939 - 19 June 1941
  - served his term to end in the parliamentary group of Agrarian League, 20 June 1941 - 5 April 1945 and was later elected on the list of the Agrarian League 8 September 1949 - 21 July 1958
