= Oskari Salonen =

Finnish journalist and politician (1881–1961)

Oskari Salonen (5 June 1881 – 20 November 1961) was a Finnish journalist and politician. Born in Kauhajoki, he was a member of the Parliament of Finland from 1933 to 1934, representing the Social Democratic Party of Finland (SDP).
