= Elli Laurila =

Finnish educator and politician (1882–1966)

Elin (Elli) Maria Laurila (19 March 1882 – 15 June 1966) was a Finnish educator and politician, born in Porvoo. She was a member of the Parliament of Finland from 7 February to 31 March 1919, representing the National Coalition Party.
