= Pekka Pennanen =

Finnish politician

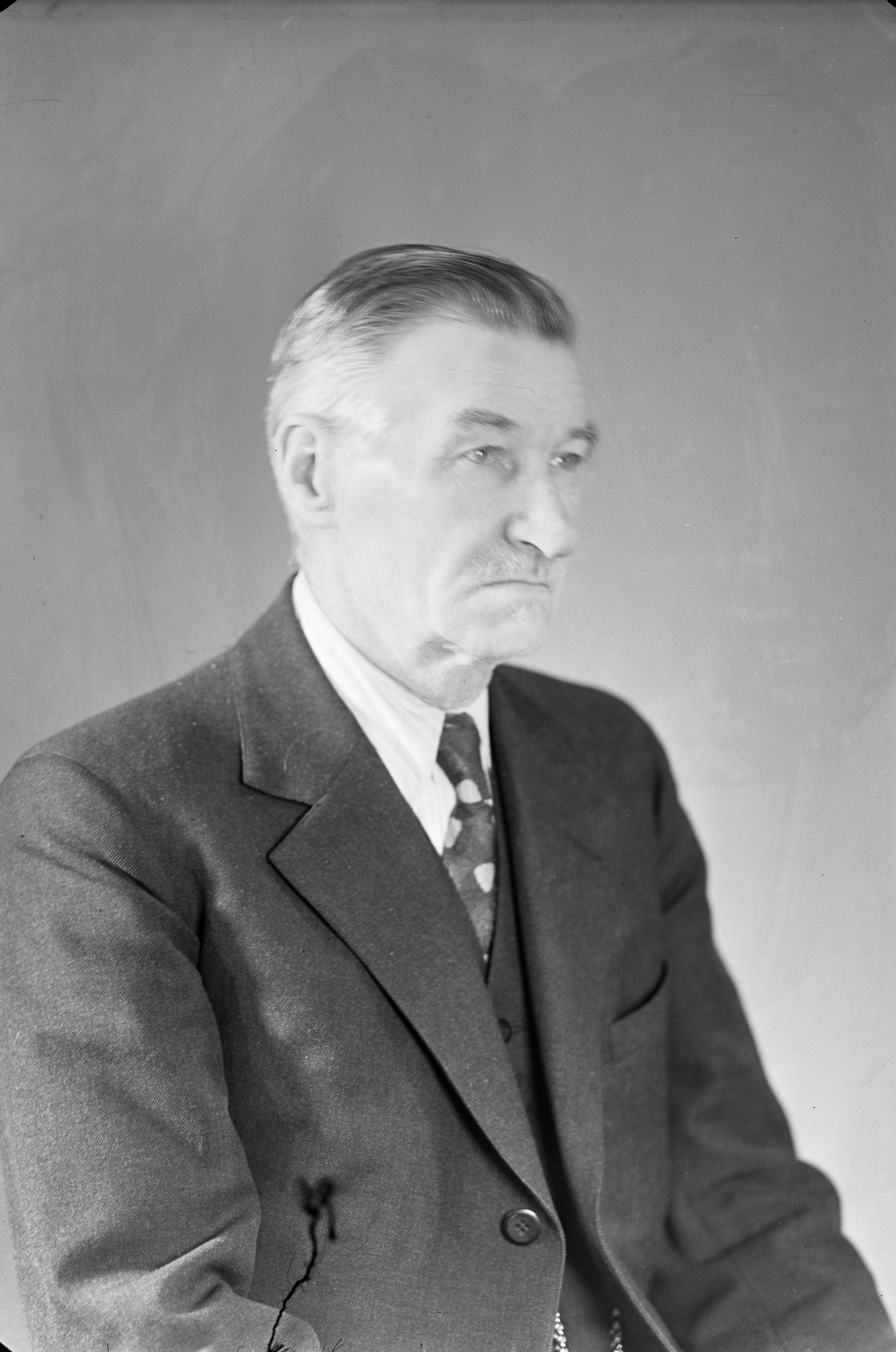
Photograph of Pekka Pennanen

Pekka Pennanen (24 February 1872 in Kesälahti – 18 July 1960 in Kesälahti) was a twentieth century Finnish politician.

He was a member of the National Coalition Party (Finland) and was the chairman of the party in 1936–1942 following the leadership of Paavo Virkkunen.
