= Cay Sundström =

Finnish dentist, politician and diplomat

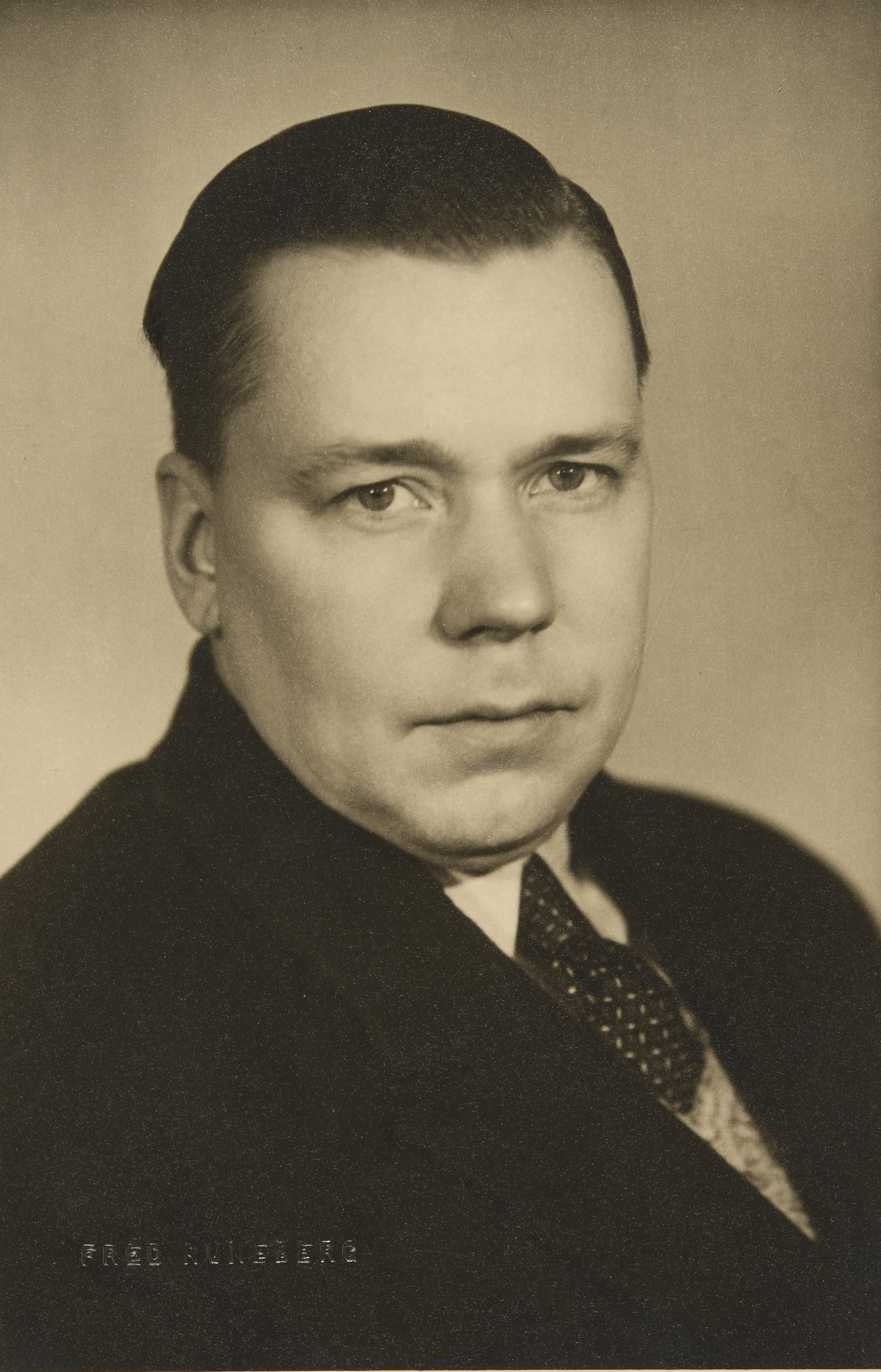
Cay Sundström in 1938.

Carl-Johan (Cay) Sundström (1 July 1902, in Hamina – 5 March 1959, in Stockholm) was a Finnish dentist, politician and diplomat. He was a member of the Parliament of Finland from 1936 to 1941 and again from 1944 to 1945, representing first the Social Democratic Party of Finland (SDP) and later the Finnish People's Democratic League (SKDL). He Joined the Socialist Unity Party (SYP), a member organisation of the SKDL.

Sundström was the chairman of the SKDL from 1944 to 1946.

From 1941 to 1944, Sundström was in prison for political reasons. He was Envoy of Finland to the Soviet Union from 1945 to 1953 and to the People's Republic of China from 1953 to 1959 (from 1954 as Ambassador).
