= Small Farmers Party =

Party of Smallholders and Rural People (Finnish: Pienviljelijäin ja maalaiskansan puolue, PMP), later renamed as the Small Farmers Party (Pienviljelijäin puolue), was a political party in Finland. The party was founded in Seinäjoki on December 20, 1936, through the unification of Small Farmers' Party of Finland (SPP), People's Party and Central League of Recession Committees. Most members of the new party came from the SPP and the organization was mainly built on the basis of the SPP. Eino Yliruusi became chairman of the new party.

The PMP had mainly a populist profile. However, because of the radical rhetoric of Yliruusi and the party's negative attitude to fascism and war, it was also seen as leftist. Some sections and members of the PMP had links to the underground Communist Party of Finland, who favoured cooperation with PMP as part of its popular front policy. The PMP leadership did however deny all forms of linkages with the communists.

The party published Suomen Pienviljelijä and Pohjanmaan Sana.

During the Winter War, the PMP criticized the pro-German policies of the government. As a result, the party organ Suomen Pienviljelijä was closed down in 1939. Yliruusi attempted to start a new publication, Suomen Sanomia, but it was rapidly closed down by the authorities. In 1941, both of the PMP MPs left the party and joined the Agrarian League. The party participated in elections until 1954, but it never returned to the parliament.

Parliamentary elections

Year	MPs	Votes	
1939	2	27 783	2.14%
1945	--	20 061	1.18%
1948	--	5 378	0.29%
1951	--	4 964	0.27%
1954	--	1 040	0.05%

Presidential elections

Year	Electors	Votes	
1950	--	689	0.04%
