= 1929 Finnish parliamentary election =

General election

← 1927	1–2 July 1929	1930 →

All 200 seats in the Parliament of Finland 101 seats needed for a majority
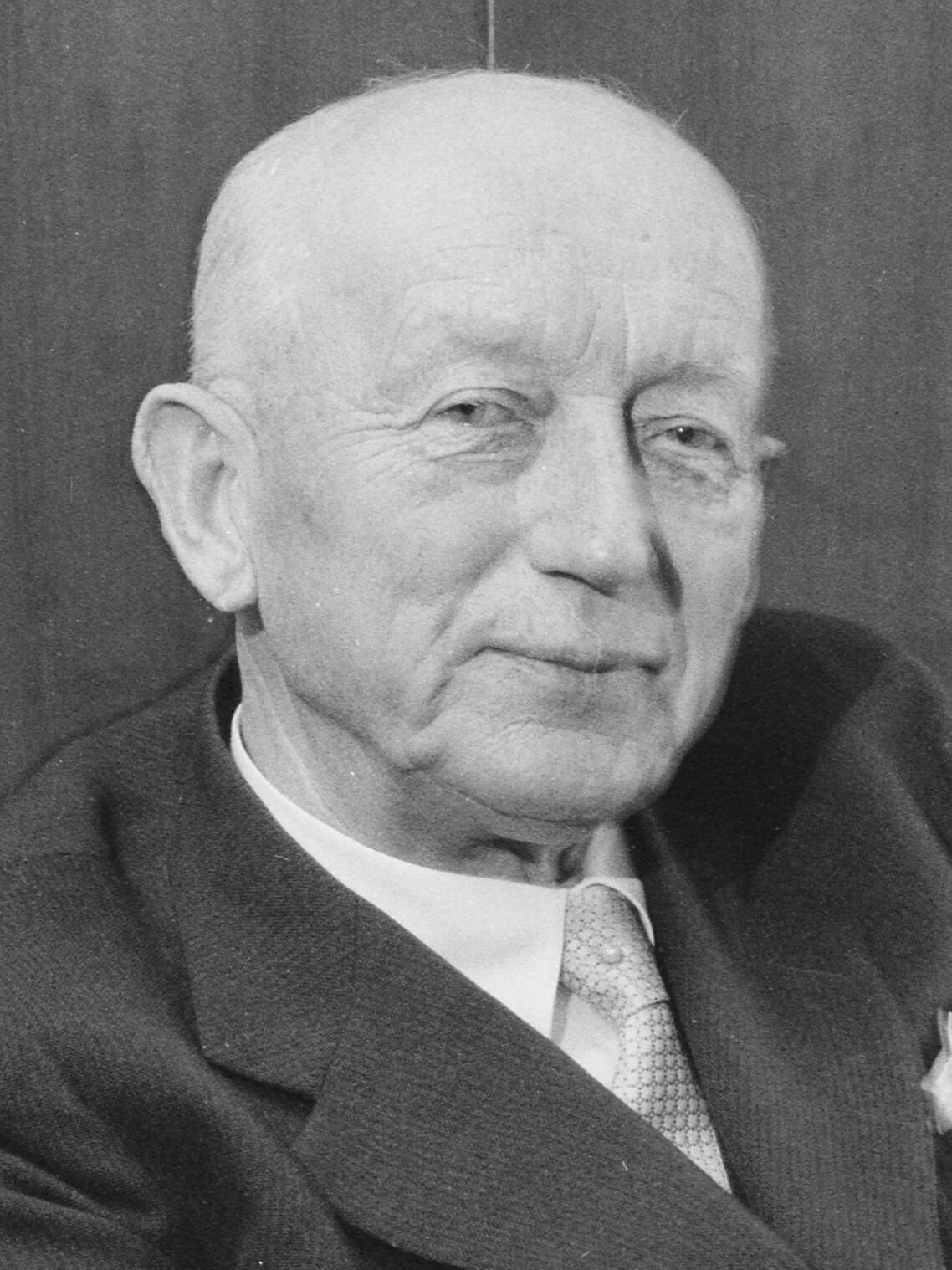

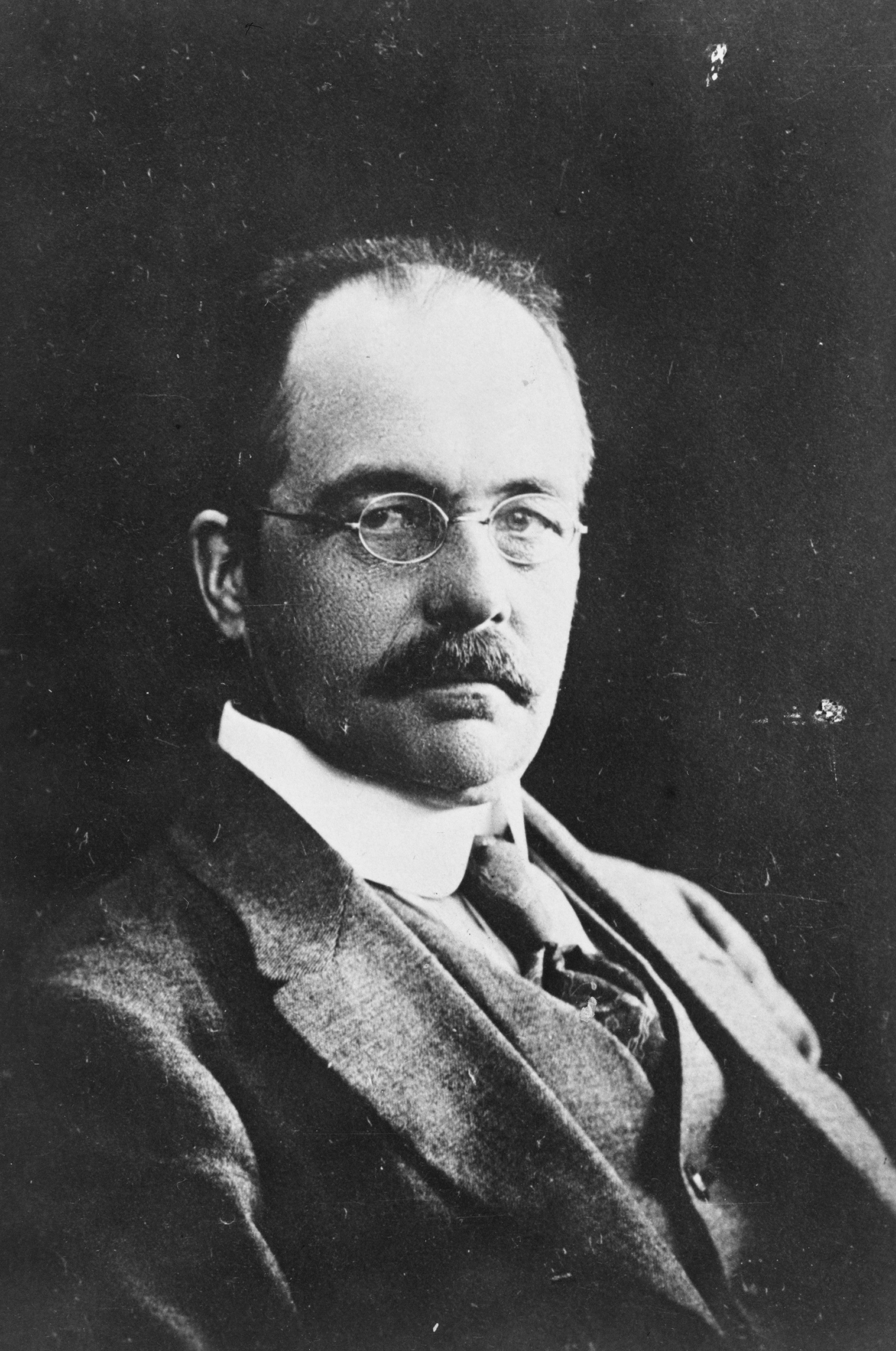

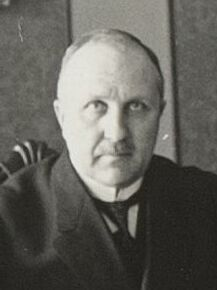

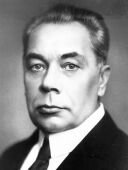
	First party	Second party	Third party
Leader	Pekka Heikkinen	Matti Paasivuori	Kyösti Haataja
Party	Agrarian	SDP	National Coalition
Last election	22.56%, 52 seats	28.30%, 60 seats	17.74%, 34 seats
Seats won	60	59	28
Seat change	▲8	▼1	▼6
Popular vote	248,762	260,254	138,008
Percentage	26.15%	27.36%	14.51%
Swing	▲3.59pp	▼0.94pp	▼3.23pp
	Fourth party	Fifth party	Sixth party
Leader		Eric von Rettig	Oskari Mantere
Party	STPV	RKP	National Progressive
Last election	12.08%, 20 seats	12.20%, 24 seats	6.77%, 10 seats
Seats won	23	23	7
Seat change	▲3	▼1	▼3
Popular vote	128,164	108,886	53,301
Percentage	13.47%	11.45%	5.60%
Swing	▲1.39pp	▼0.75pp	▼1.17pp
Prime Minister before election
Oskari Mantere
National Progressive
Prime Minister after election
Kyösti Kallio
Agrarian

Parliamentary elections were held in Finland on 1 and 2 July 1929. The result was a victory for the Agrarian League, which won 60 of the 200 seats in Parliament. Voter turnout was 55.6%.

== Background ==
President Relander, an Agrarian, believed that the Finnish civil servants should get a pay raise, after a long period of frozen salaries, that had caused them to lose a significant amount of purchasing power. Most of his fellow Agrarians opposed him and the Progressive minority government of Prime Minister Mantere on this issue, arguing that the civil servants, on average, were still clearly better paid than the agricultural workers. After the Finnish Parliament rejected the government's legislative proposal on the increase of civil servants' salaries in April 1929, President Relander dissolved Parliament and called early elections for July. The Agrarians and Communists campaigned on the rejection of the civil servants' proposed salary increases, and both parties gained seats. The National Coalitioners and Progressives who favoured the salary increases suffered a defeat. President Relander was displeased by the Agrarians' victory, because he could not get along well with their leader, Mr. Kallio, but he reluctantly appointed Kallio as Prime Minister of an Agrarian minority government after the elections.

== Results ==
Party	Votes	%	Seats	+/–
Agrarian League	248,762	26.15	60	+8
Social Democratic Party	260,254	27.36	59	–1
National Coalition Party	138,008	14.51	28	–6
Electoral Organisation of Socialist Workers and Smallholders	128,164	13.47	23	+3
Swedish People's Party	108,886	11.45	23	–1
National Progressive Party	53,301	5.60	7	–3
Small Farmers' Party	10,154	1.07	0	New
Peasant People's Party–Farmers' Party	1,258	0.13	0	0
Others	2,483	0.26	0	–
Total	951,270	100.00	200	0
Valid votes	951,270	99.47		
Invalid/blank votes	5,026	0.53		
Total votes	956,296	100.00		
Registered voters/turnout	1,719,567	55.61		
Source: Nohlen & Stöver, Tilastokeskus 2004, Lackman
