= People's Party (Finland, 1932) =

Defunct Finnish political party (1932–1936)

- Founded: 1932
- Headquarters: Ylivieska
- Ideology: Agrarianism; Populism

The People's Party (Finnish: Kansanpuolue) was a political party in Finland. It had a populist and peasant-oriented profile. The party was founded in Ylivieska on August 21, 1932 and it was mainly active in Kalajokilaakso region. Yrjö Hautala was the chairman of the party, and Fredrik Rautio the vice chairman. In 1936, the party merged with others to form Party of Smallholders and Rural People.

During 1932, the party began publishing Kansan Sana. In 1934, the party organ merged with Pohjanmaan pienviljelijä, the organ of the Small Farmers' Party of Finland. The joint organ of both parties was known as Pohjanmaan Sana. In 1936, however, the relations between the two parties got colder and People's Party chose to begin a new organ, Maalaiskansa.

The People's Party contested the 1933 national election. The party received 9,390 votes (0.80%) and won two seats in the Eduskunta. Its MPs were Heikki Niskanen and Yrjö Hautala, both elected from Oulu Province. The party also had candidates in Vaasa Province. In the 1936 national election, the party received 7,449 votes (0.63%) and one seat. After the election the party merged with the Small Farmers' Party of Finland and the Central League of Recession Committees, forming the Party of Smallholders and Rural People. Discussions of forming a new united party had been ongoing for years. The rivalries were settled only after both parties suffered losses in the election.
