= 1945 Finnish parliamentary election =

← 1939	17–18 March 1945	1948 →

All 200 seats in the Parliament of Finland 101 seats needed for a majority
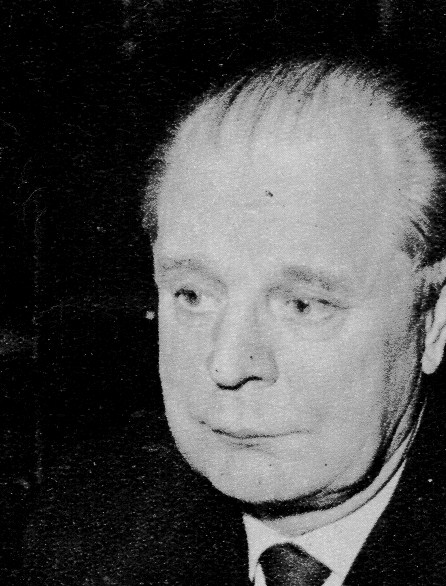

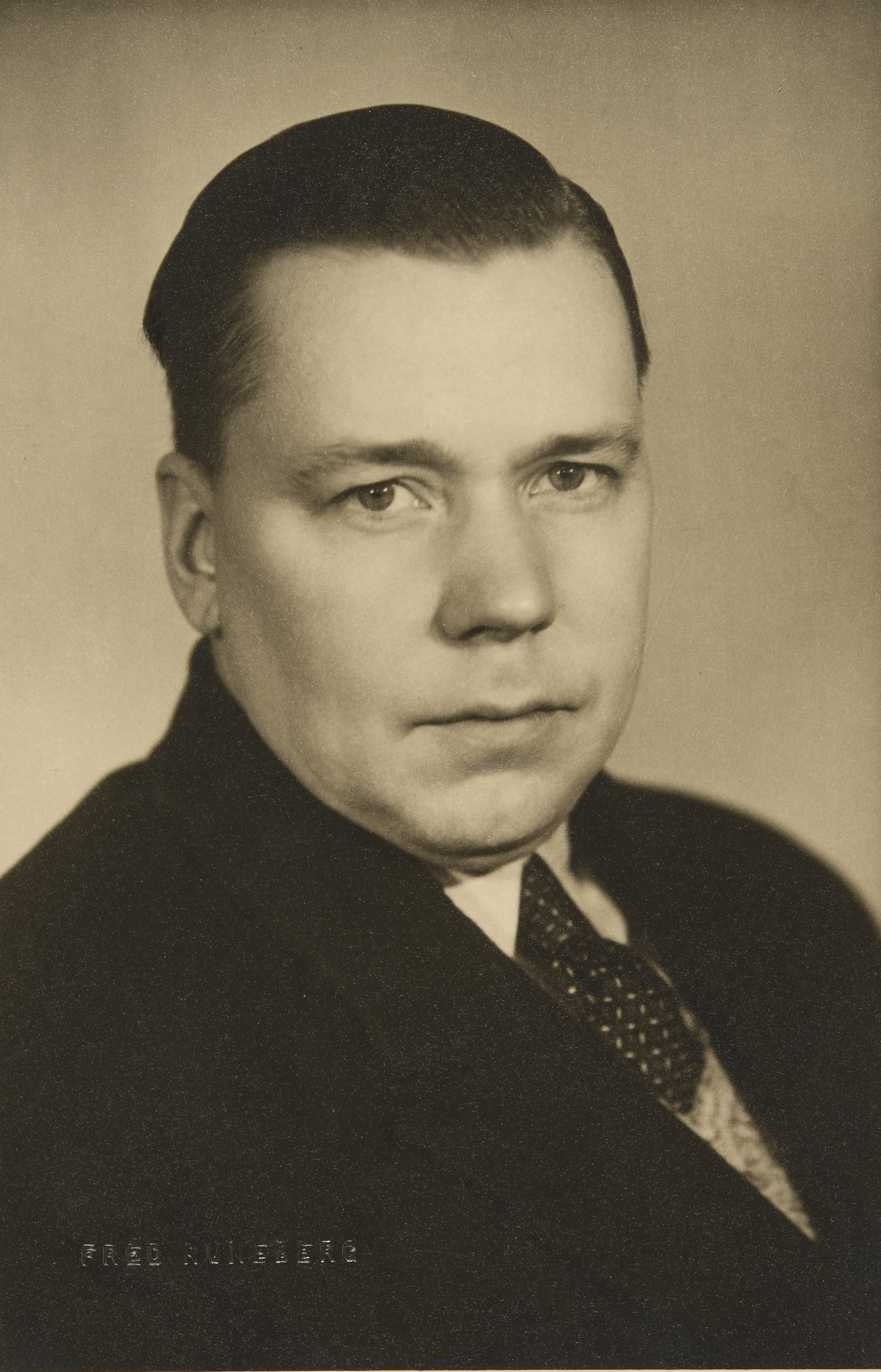

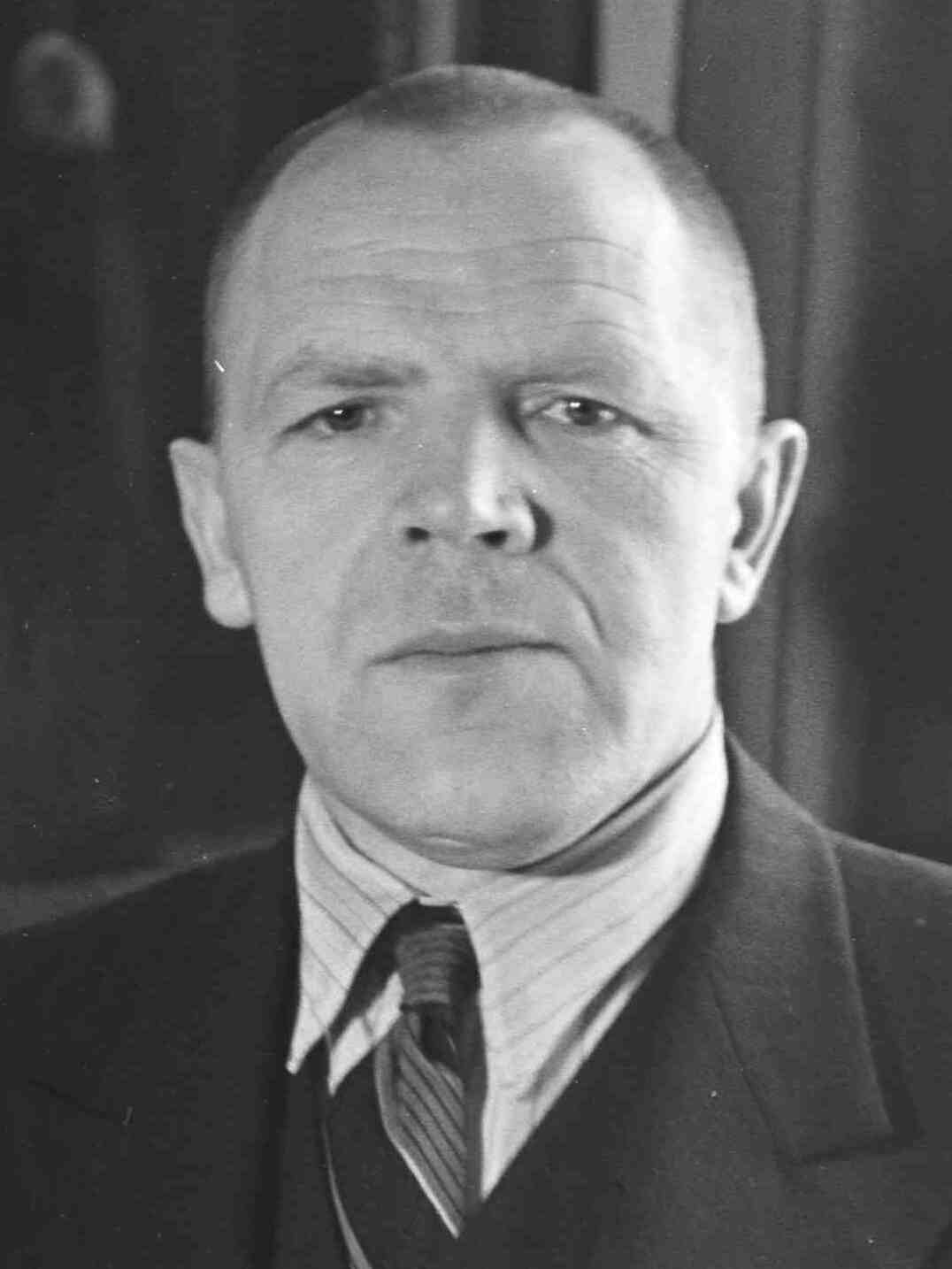

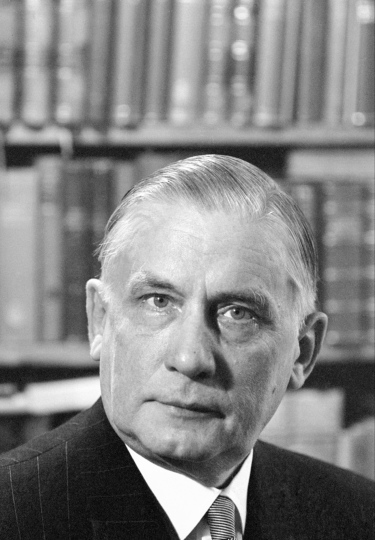

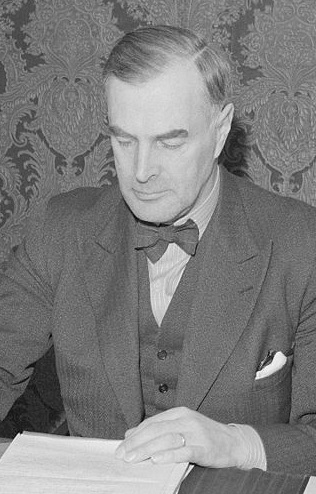

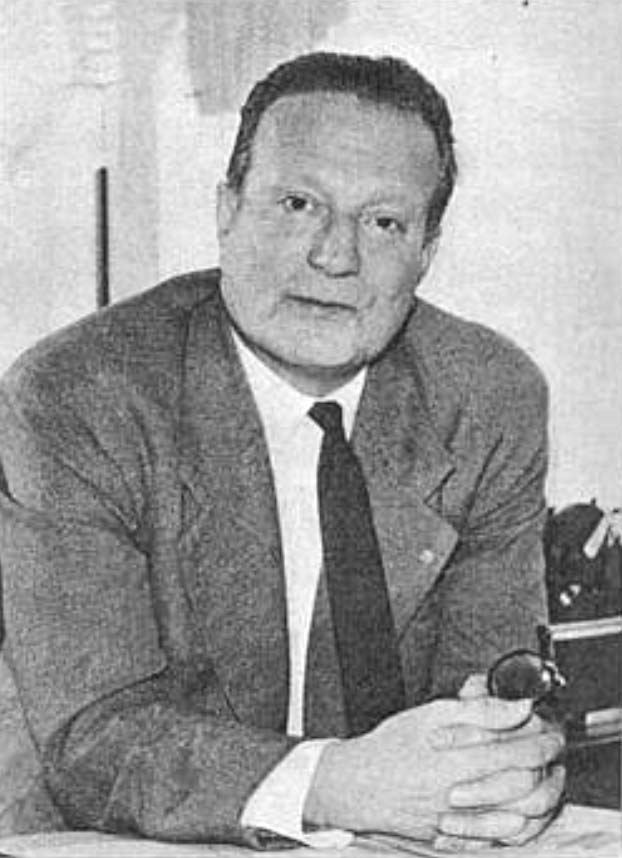
	First party	Second party	Third party
Leader	Onni Hiltunen	Cay Sundström	Viljami Kalliokoski
Party	SDP	SKDL	Agrarian
Last election	85 seats, 39.77%	–	56 seats, 22.86%
Seats won	50	49	49
Seat change	▼35	new	▼7
Popular vote	425,948	398,618	362,662
Percentage	25.08%	23.47%	21.35%
Swing	▼14.69pp	new	▼1.51pp
	Fourth party	Fifth party	Sixth party
Leader	Edwin Linkomies	Ernst von Born	Tyko Tarponen
Party	National Coalition	RKP	National Progressive
Last election	25 seats, 13.58%	18 seats, 9.61%	6 seats, 4.81%
Seats won	28	14	9
Seat change	▲5	▼4	▲3
Popular vote	255,394	134,106	87,868
Percentage	15.04%	7.90%	5.17%
Swing	▲1.46pp	▼1.71pp	▲0.36pp
	Seventh party
Party	Swedish Left
Last election	0 seats, 0.46%
Seats won	1
Seat change	▲1
Popular vote	8,192
Percentage	0.48%
Swing	▲0.02pp
Prime Minister before election
Juho Kusti Paasikivi
National Coalition
Prime Minister after election
Juho Kusti Paasikivi
National Coalition

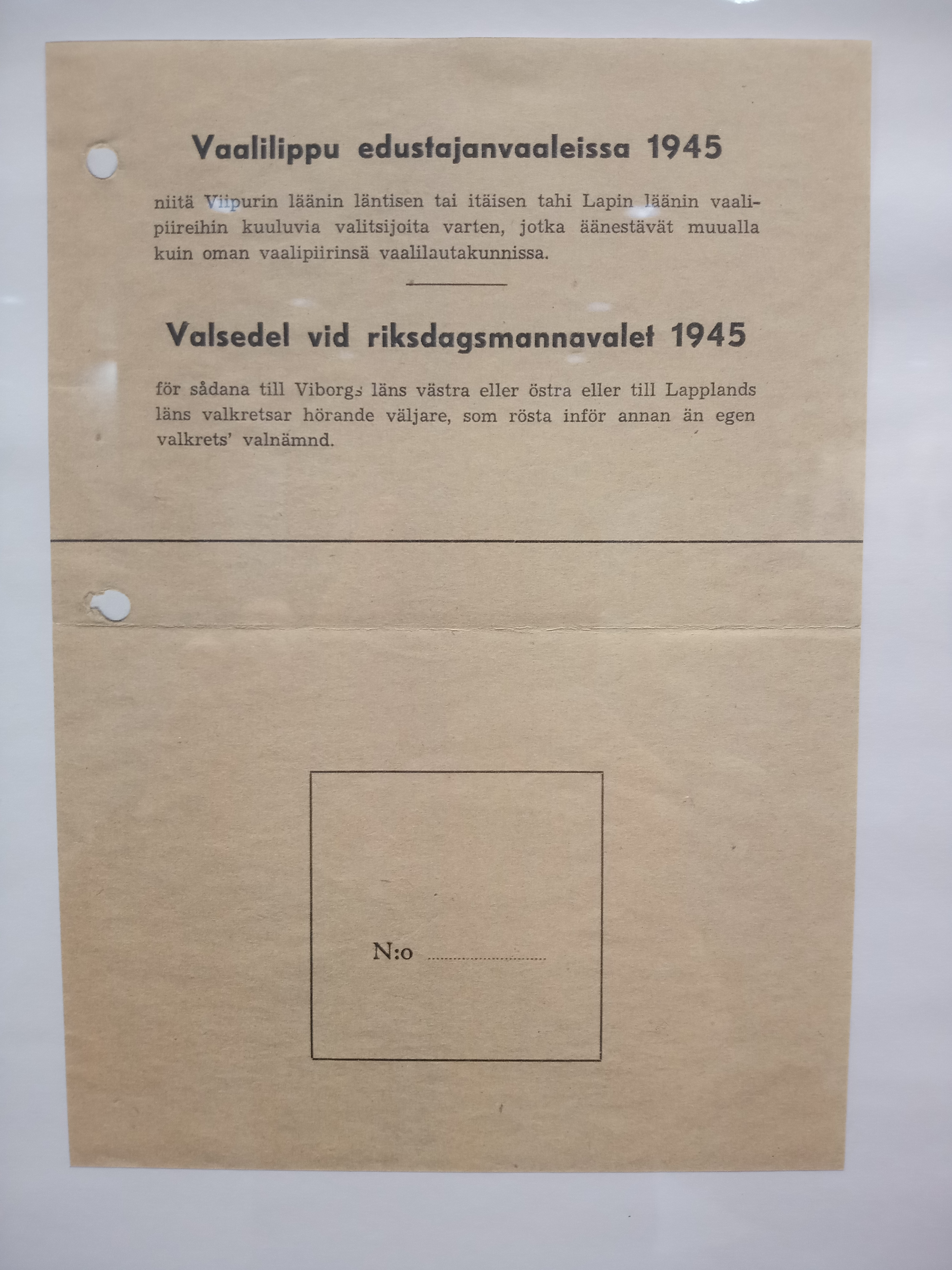
Ballot paper

Parliamentary elections were held in Finland on 17 and 18 March 1945. The broad-based centre-left government of Prime Minister Juho Kusti Paasikivi (National Coalition/Independent) remained in office after the elections.

== Background ==
The communists could, for the first time since 1929, freely present their candidates. Through the Finnish People's Democratic League (SKDL), they were able to win over a large section of Social Democratic voters. The Patriotic People's Movement (IKL) had been banned by the time of the election. Prime Minister Paasikivi urged in February 1945 Finnish voters to elect "new faces" to Parliament, which they certainly did: almost half of the 200 deputies were new. Some wartime deputies, including Social Democrat Väinö Tanner and Agrarian Viljami Kalliokoski, decided voluntarily not to seek re-election, because under the new political climate (Finland's desire to establish friendly relations with the Soviet Union), their wartime political activities, including their association with the informal Finnish-German military alliance, looked suspicious. The right-wing and centrist parties had to campaign carefully, so as not to appear anti-Soviet, while the Communists could loudly and vigorously accuse the right-wing and centrist parties of accepting their ban from open political activity, which had lasted from 1930 to 1944. One major economic issue in these elections was the continued scarcity of goods caused by the wartime rationing. Communists promised the impoverished voters a quick improvement in their living standards, and also other major parties promised more prosperity in the starting peacetime. These promises were made despite the still limited Finnish foreign trade - World War II would only end in Europe in May and in Asia in September - and the heavy burden which the Soviet Union's war reparations payments imposed on the Finnish economy.

== Results ==
Party	Votes	%	Seats	+/–
Social Democratic Party	425,948	25.08	50	–35
Finnish People's Democratic League	398,618	23.47	49	New
Agrarian League	362,662	21.35	49	–7
National Coalition Party	255,394	15.04	28	+3
Swedish People's Party	134,106	7.90	14	–4
National Progressive Party	87,868	5.17	9	+3
Small Farmers Party	20,061	1.18	0	–2
Swedish Left	8,192	0.48	1	+1
Radical People's Party	1,623	0.10	0	New
Others	3,904	0.23	0	–
Total	1,698,376	100.00	200	0
Valid votes	1,698,376	99.31		
Invalid/blank votes	11,875	0.69		
Total votes	1,710,251	100.00		
Registered voters/turnout	2,284,249	74.87		
Source: Tilastokeskus 2004, Suomen virallinen tilasto

=== By electoral district ===
Electoral district	Total seats	Seats won						
Electoral district	Total seats	SDP	SKDL	ML	Kok	RKP	KE	SV
Central Finland	11	3	3	3	1		1	
East Viipuri	17	4	2	9	2			
Häme	11	4	3	1	2		1	
Lapland	8	1	2	4	1			
North Karelia	10	4	2	3	1			
North Savo	11	3	4	3	1			
North Vaasa	8	1	1	2	1	3		
Oulu	17	2	5	7	2		1	
Pirkanmaa	11	4	3	1	2		1	
Satakunta	14	4	4	3	2		1	
South Savo	11	4	2	4	1			
South Vaasa	10	1	2	2	2	3		
Uusimaa	31	7	9	1	5	6	2	1
Varsinais-Suomi	15	3	5	2	2	2	1	
West Viipuri	15	5	2	4	3		1	
Total	200	50	49	49	28	14	9	1
Source: Statistics Finland
