= 1933 Finnish parliamentary election =

General election

← 1930	1–3 July 1933	1936 →

All 200 seats in the Parliament of Finland 101 seats needed for a majority
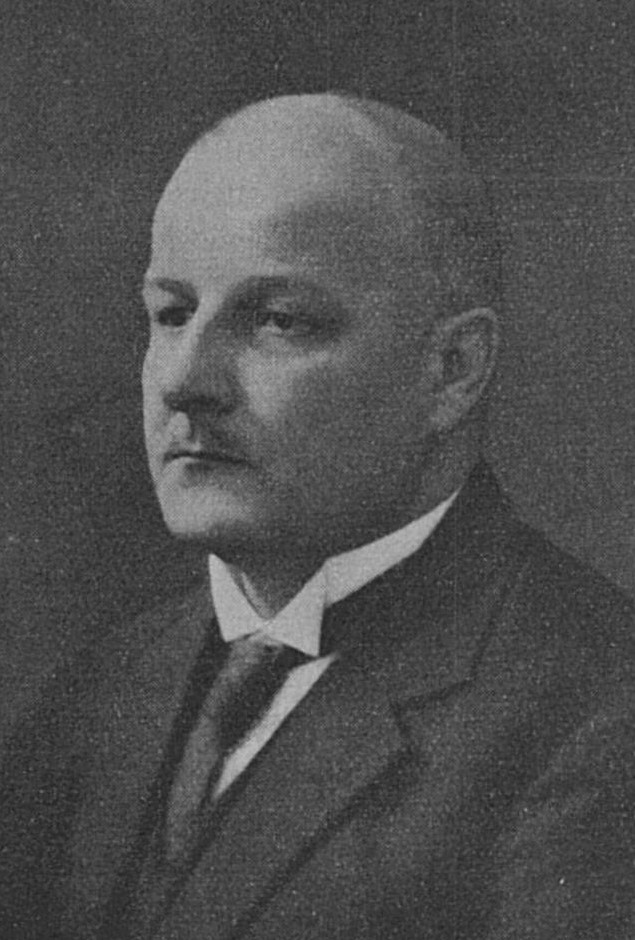

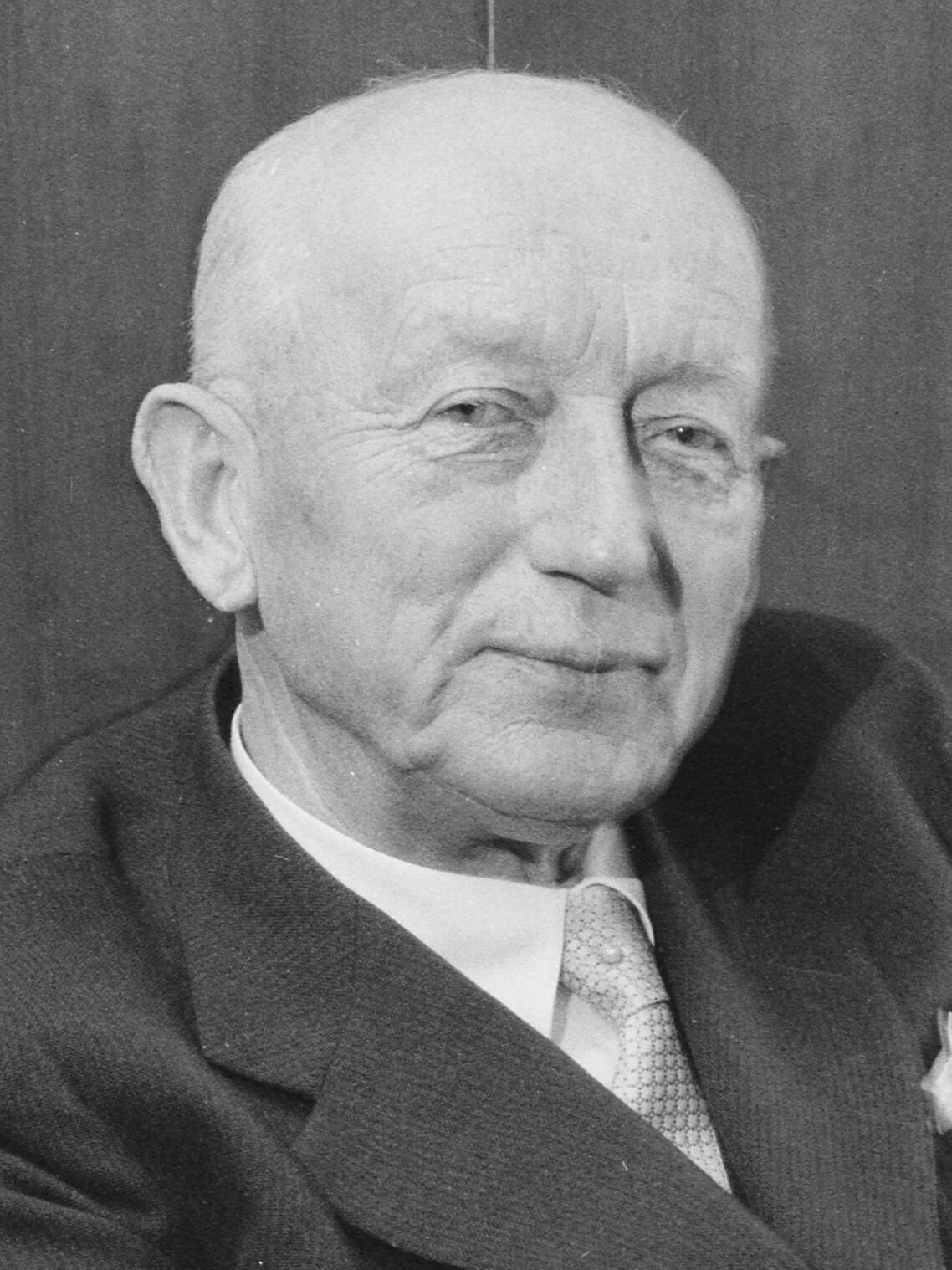

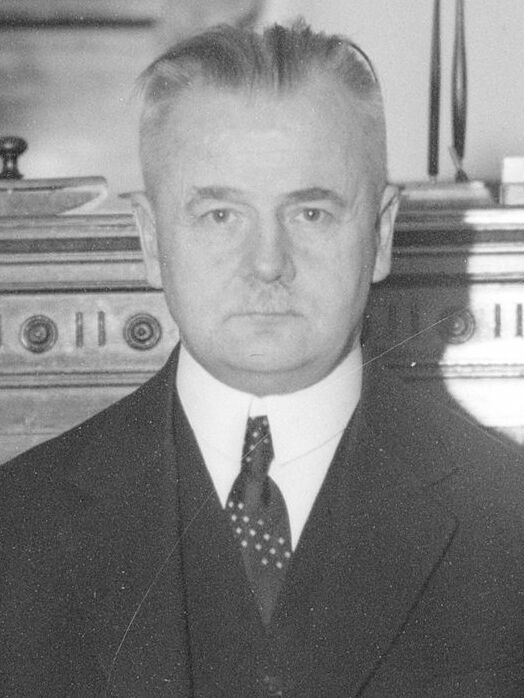

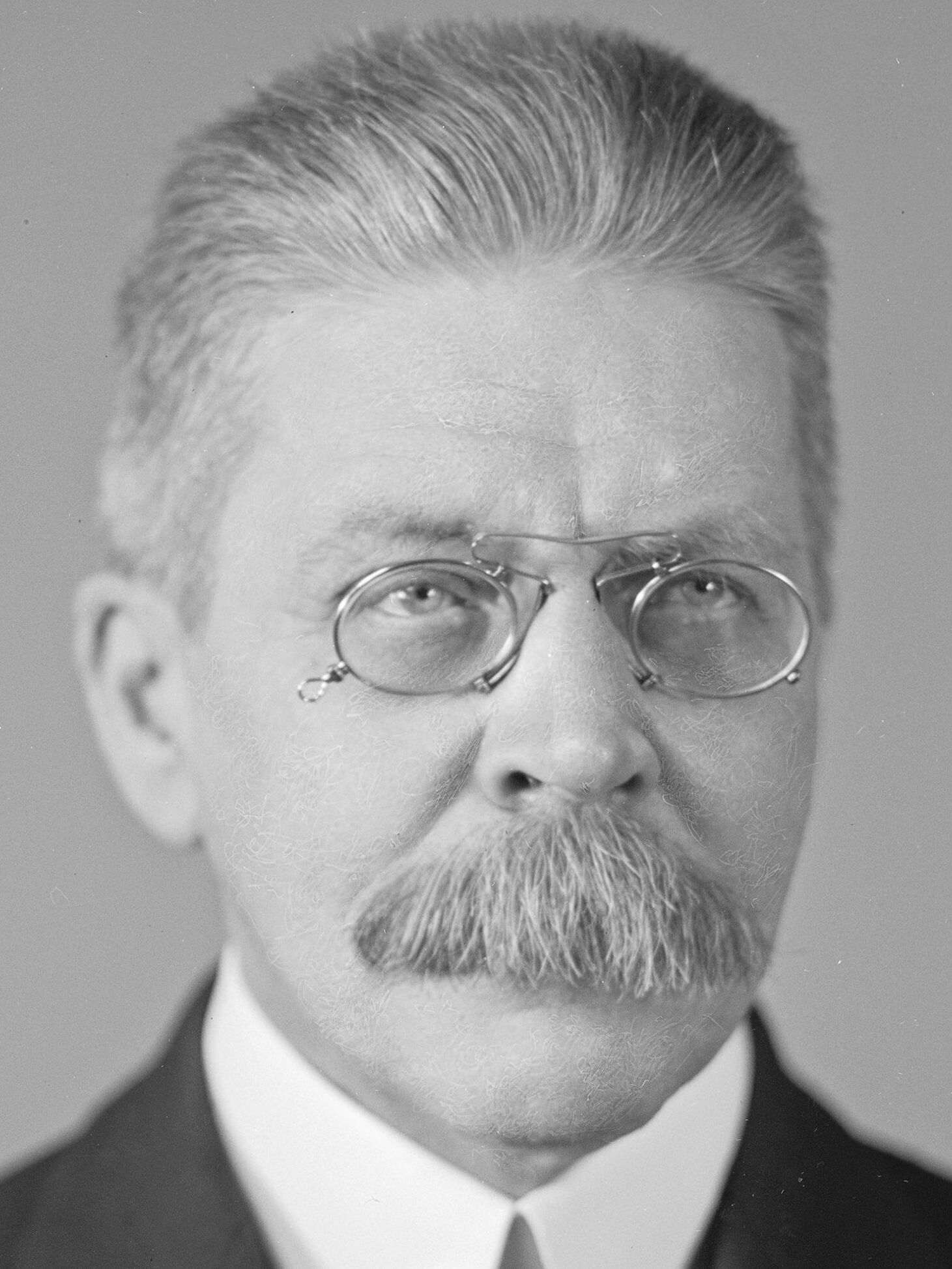

	First party	Second party	Third party
Leader	Kaarlo Harvala	Pekka Heikkinen	Paavo Virkkunen
Party	SDP	Agrarian	National Coalition–IKL
Last election	34.16%, 66 seats	27.28%, 59 seats	18.05%, 42 seats
Seats won	78	53	32
Seat change	▲12	▼6	▼10
Popular vote	413,551	249,758	187,527
Percentage	37.33%	22.54%	16.93%
Swing	▲3.17pp	▼4.74pp	▼1.12pp
	Fourth party	Fifth party	Sixth party
Leader	Eric von Rettig	Aimo Cajander
Party	RKP	National Progressive	Small Farmers'
Last election	10.03%, 20 seats	5.83%, 11 seats	1.85%, 1 seats
Seats won	21	11	3
Seat change	▲1	Steady	▲2
Popular vote	115,433	82,129	37,544
Percentage	10.42%	7.41%	3.39%
Swing	▲0.39pp	▲1.58pp	▲1.54pp
	Seventh party
Party	People's
Last election	–
Seats won	2
Seat change	New
Popular vote	9,390
Percentage	0.85%
Swing	New
Prime Minister before election
Toivo Mikael Kivimäki
National Progressive
Prime Minister after election
Toivo Mikael Kivimäki
National Progressive

Parliamentary elections were held in Finland between 1 and 3 July 1933. The Social Democratic Party remained the largest party in Parliament with 78 of the 200 seats. However, Prime Minister Toivo Mikael Kivimäki of the National Progressive Party continued in office after the elections, supported by Pehr Evind Svinhufvud and quietly by most Agrarians and Social Democrats. They considered Kivimäki's right-wing government a lesser evil than political instability (various short-lived governments) or an attempt by the radical right to gain power. Voter turnout was 62.2%.

== Background ==
The main campaign issues were the differing attitudes towards democracy and the rule of law between the Patriotic Electoral Alliance (National Coalitioners and Patriotic People's Movement) and the Legality Front (Social Democrats, Agrarians, Swedish People's Party and Progressives). The Patriotic Electoral Alliance favoured continuing the search for suspected Communists - the Communist Party and its affiliated organizations had been outlawed in 1930 as treasonous organizations - and was against the Social Democrats' joining the government under any circumstances. The Legality Front did not want to spend any significant time on searching suspected Communists, but rather wanted to concentrate on keeping the far right in check. The Lapua Movement had been outlawed after its failed Mäntsälä rebellion in March 1932, and the Patriotic People's Movement had been established as its successor later in 1932. President Svinhufvud (National Coalition) strictly guarded law and order, an attitude which made him somewhat suspicious of the Patriotic People's Movement's motives. Prime Minister Kivimäki (Progressive) led a right-wing minority government, which President Svinhufvud fully supported in the effort to fight the Great Depression. Despite the Patriotic Electoral Alliance's vigorous election campaign, only about one-sixth of the participating Finnish voters supported it.

== Results ==
Party	Votes	%	Seats	+/–
Social Democratic Party	413,551	37.33	78	+12
Agrarian League	249,758	22.54	53	–6
National Coalition Party–Patriotic People's Movement	187,527	16.93	32	–10
Swedish People's Party	115,433	10.42	21	+1
National Progressive Party	82,129	7.41	11	0
Small Farmers' Party	37,544	3.39	3	+2
People's Party	9,390	0.85	2	New
List for the Working People	2,667	0.24	0	New
Finnish People's Organisation	2,103	0.19	0	New
List of Real Finns, Temperance People etc.	1,476	0.13	0	New
National Socialist Union	1,406	0.13	0	New
List of Working People, Peasants and Intellectuals	787	0.07	0	New
List of Recession Men	645	0.06	0	New
List of Jaakko Seise	630	0.06	0	New
For the Poor–People's Party	370	0.03	0	New
Rural People's Party–Party of Finnish Labor	311	0.03	0	New
Party of Finnish Labor	226	0.02	0	New
List "V.F.Johanson and M.Saarikoski"	145	0.01	0	New
List of National Economy	101	0.01	0	New
List F (Läheniemists)	96	0.01	0	New
Others	1,528	0.14	0	–
Total	1,107,823	100.00	200	0
Valid votes	1,107,823	99.56		
Invalid/blank votes	4,917	0.44		
Total votes	1,112,740	100.00		
Registered voters/turnout	1,789,331	62.19		
Source: Nohlen & Stöver, Tilastokeskus 2004, Suomen virallinen tilasto
