= 1930 Finnish parliamentary election =

General election

← 1929	1–2 October 1930	1933 →

All 200 seats in the Parliament of Finland 101 seats needed for a majority
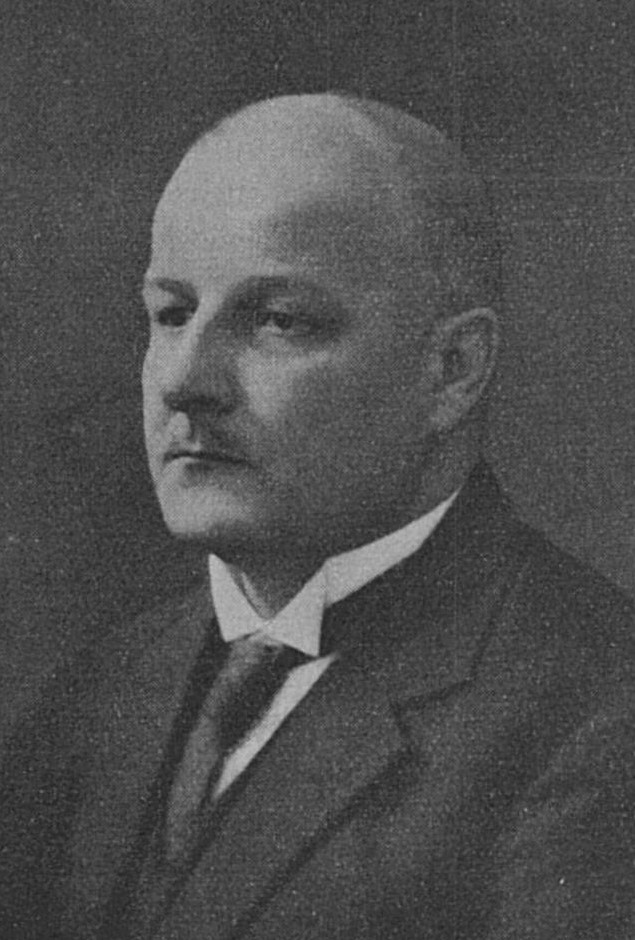

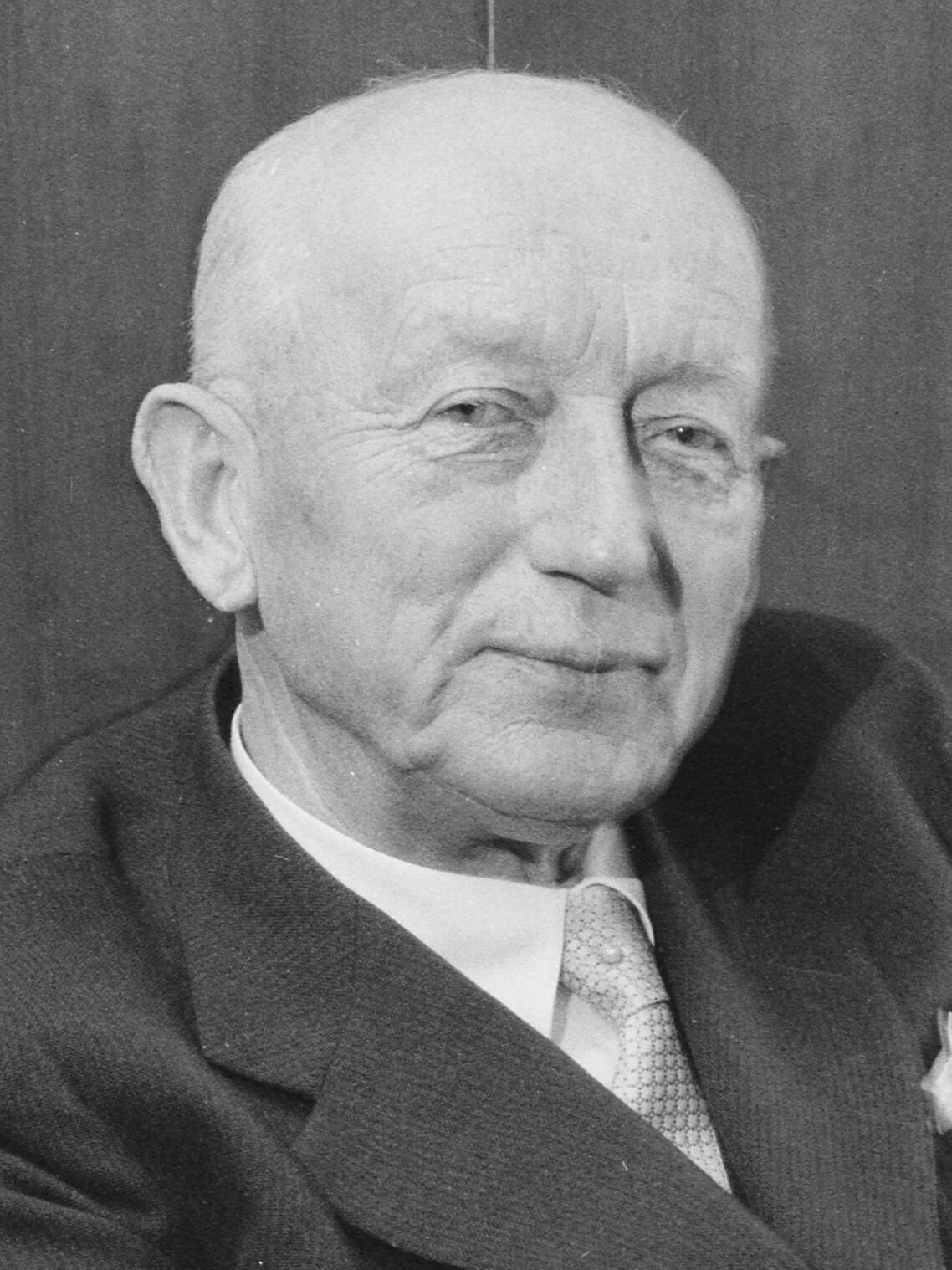

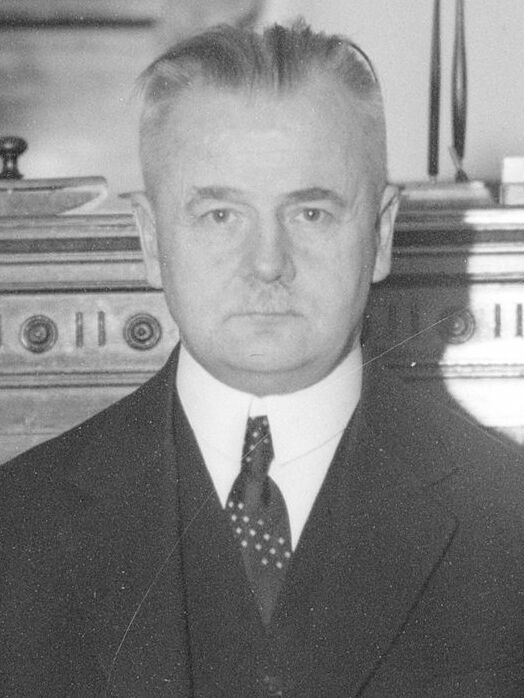

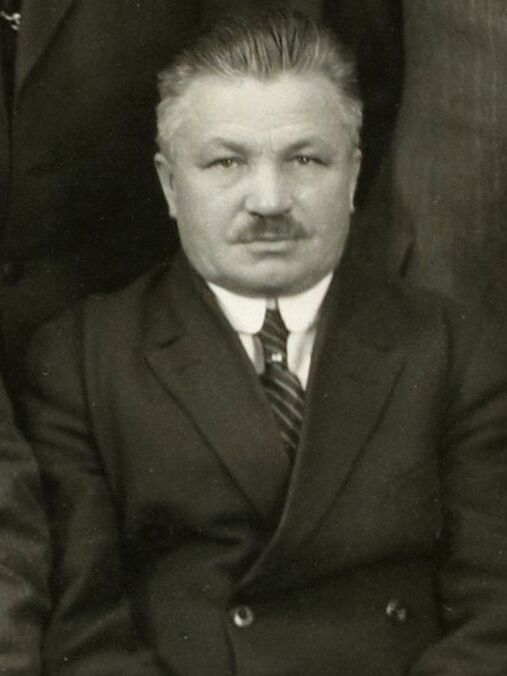

	First party	Second party	Third party
Leader	Kaarlo Harvala	Pekka Heikkinen	Paavo Virkkunen
Party	SDP	Agrarian	National Coalition
Last election	27.36%, 59 seats	26.15%, 60 seats	14.51%, 28 seats
Seats won	66	59	42
Seat change	▲7	▼1	▲14
Popular vote	386,026	308,280	203,958
Percentage	34.16%	27.28%	18.05%
Swing	▲6.80pp	▲1.13pp	▲3.54pp
	Fourth party	Fifth party	Sixth party
Leader	Eric von Rettig	Eemil Linna
Party	RKP	National Progressive	Small Farmers'
Last election	11.45%, 23 seats	5.60%, 7 seats	1.07%, 0 seats
Seats won	20	11	1
Seat change	▼3	▲4	▲1
Popular vote	113,318	65,830	20,883
Percentage	10.03%	5.83%	1.85%
Swing	▼1.42pp	▲0.23pp	▲0.78pp
	Seventh party
Party	Swedish Left
Last election	–
Seats won	1
Seat change	New
Popular vote	9,226
Percentage	0.82
Swing	New
Prime Minister before election
Pehr Evind Svinhufvud
National Coalition
Prime Minister after election
Pehr Evind Svinhufvud
National Coalition

Parliamentary elections were held in Finland on 1 and 2 October 1930. The Social Democratic Party emerged as the largest in Parliament with 66 of the 200 seats. Voter turnout was 65.9%.

== Background ==
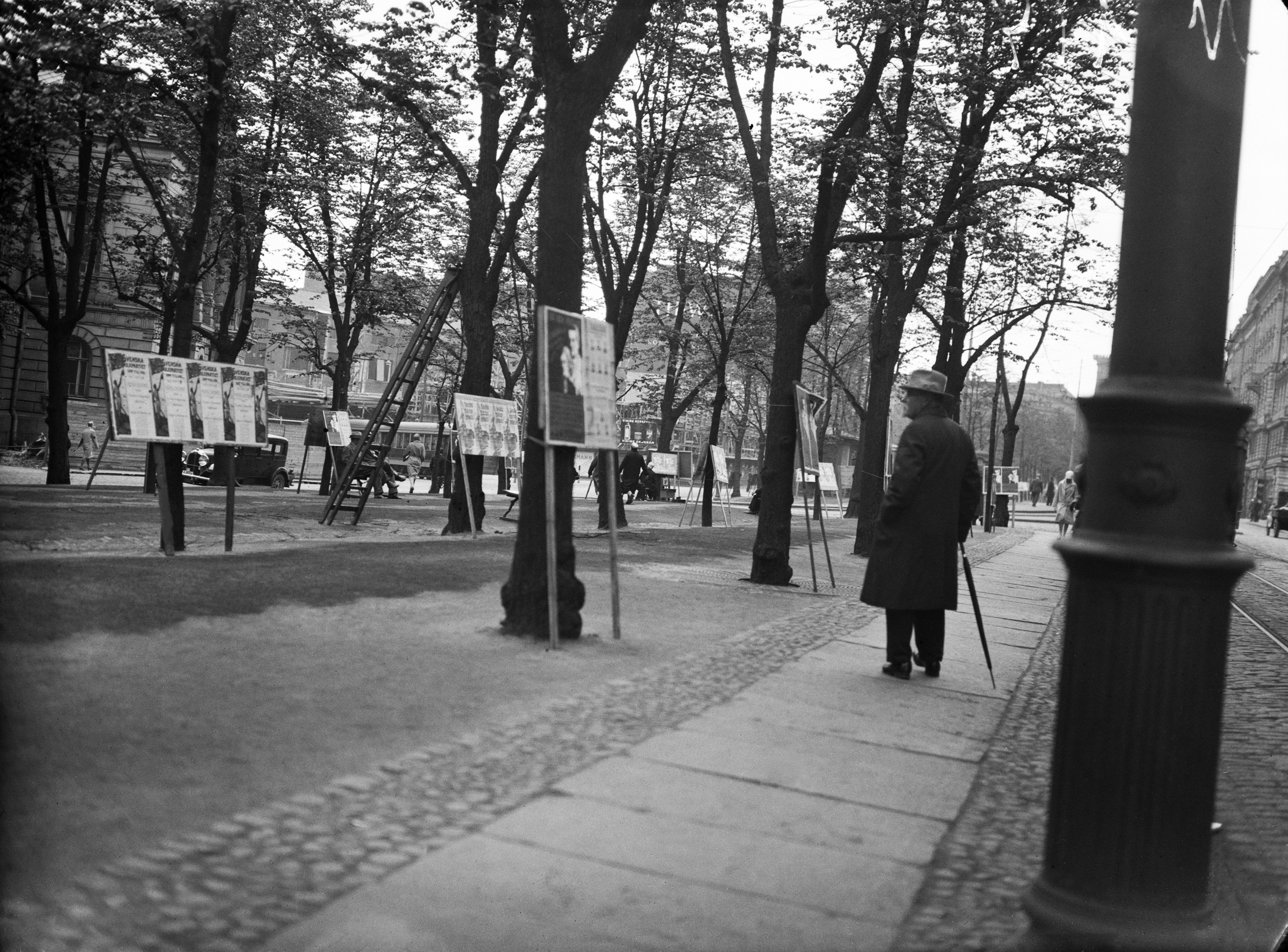
1930 Finnish parliamentary election posters on Heikinesplanadi

The 1930 elections were conducted in a politically heated atmosphere. The far-right Lapua Movement, which had been organized in November 1929, pressured the government to outlaw the Communist Party and its cover organizations, such as the Workers' and Small Farmers' Electoral Associations, as treasonous organizations. Prime Minister Kallio tried to persuade the Parliament to outlaw the Communists' political activity in June 1930, but the proposed constitutional amendment did not gain the five-sixths majority required for an immediate amendment of the Constitution. Thus the constitutional changes would have to be ratified by the next Parliament. Kallio resigned, partly pressured to do so by President Relander. In July 1930, Relander appointed as the new prime minister Mr. P.E. Svinhufvud (National Coalition), a former prime minister and regent. His government sought to persuade the Finnish voters to elect a Parliament where the right-wing and centrist parties would have a two-thirds majority, which was - and is - needed to ratify changes to the Finnish Constitution. As a part of their strategy, they authorized the Investigative Central Police to deprive about 20,000 suspected Communists of the right to vote. The Lapua Movement kidnapped, took by car to isolated places and physically assaulted various left-wing politicians.

== Results ==
Party	Votes	%	Seats	+/–
Social Democratic Party	386,026	34.16	66	+7
Agrarian League	308,280	27.28	59	–1
National Coalition Party	203,958	18.05	42	+14
Swedish People's Party	113,318	10.03	20	–3
National Progressive Party	65,830	5.83	11	+4
Small Farmers' Party	20,883	1.85	1	+1
Socialist List of Workers and Peasants	11,504	1.02	0	–23
Swedish Left	9,226	0.82	1	New
Small groups (Note: Isänmaallinen työväki, Itsenäiset maalaiset, Maalaisliitto puolueettomana isänmaan hyväksi, Vapaa työväenliitto työväen vapauden puolesta, Maalaisliittolainen valitsijayhdistys, Lapuanliike & Oikeistomaalaisliittolaiset) of the Patriotic List (Note: Parties on the Patriotic List: ML+Kok.+Ed+RKP (Turun et., Viipurin länt.), ML+Kok.+Ed (Turun pohj., Hämeen et., Hämeen pohj., Viipurin it., Oulun et.), Kok.+Ed. (Mikkelin, Kuopion länt., Kuopion it., Viipurin it, Oulun pohj.).)	9,085	0.80	0	–
Others	1,918	0.17	0	–
Total	1,130,028	100.00	200	0
Valid votes	1,130,028	99.51		
Invalid/blank votes	5,517	0.49		
Total votes	1,135,545	100.00		
Registered voters/turnout	1,722,588	65.92		
Source: Nohlen & Stöver, Tilastokeskus 2004, Suomen virallinen tilasto

== Aftermath ==
The right-wing and centrist parties received exactly two-thirds of the seats, and thus the new Parliament ratified the constitutional amendments which outlawed the Communist Party and its affiliated organizations until 1944.
