= 1936 Finnish parliamentary election =

← 1933	1–2 July 1936	1939 →

All 200 seats in the Parliament of Finland 101 seats needed for a majority
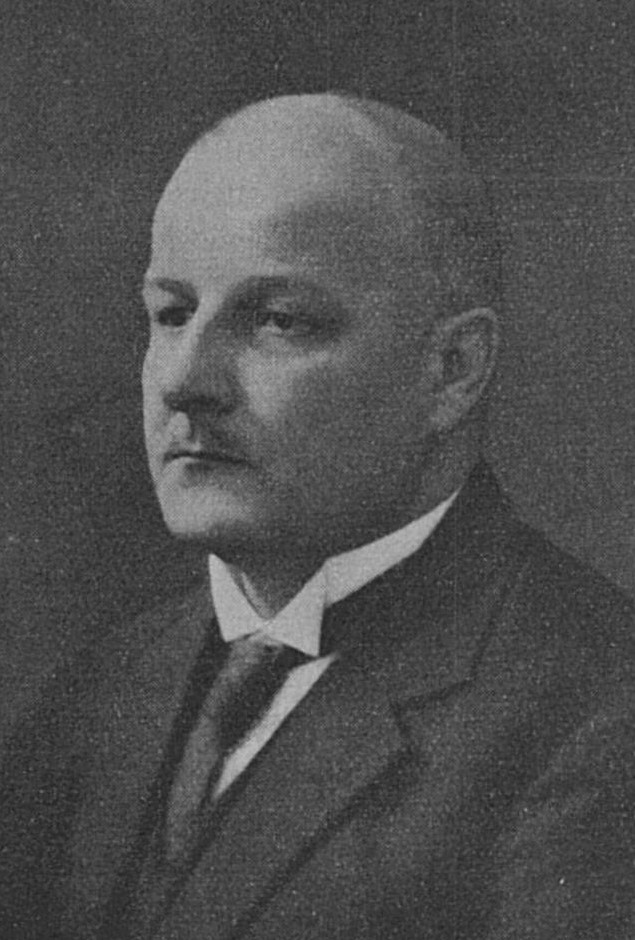

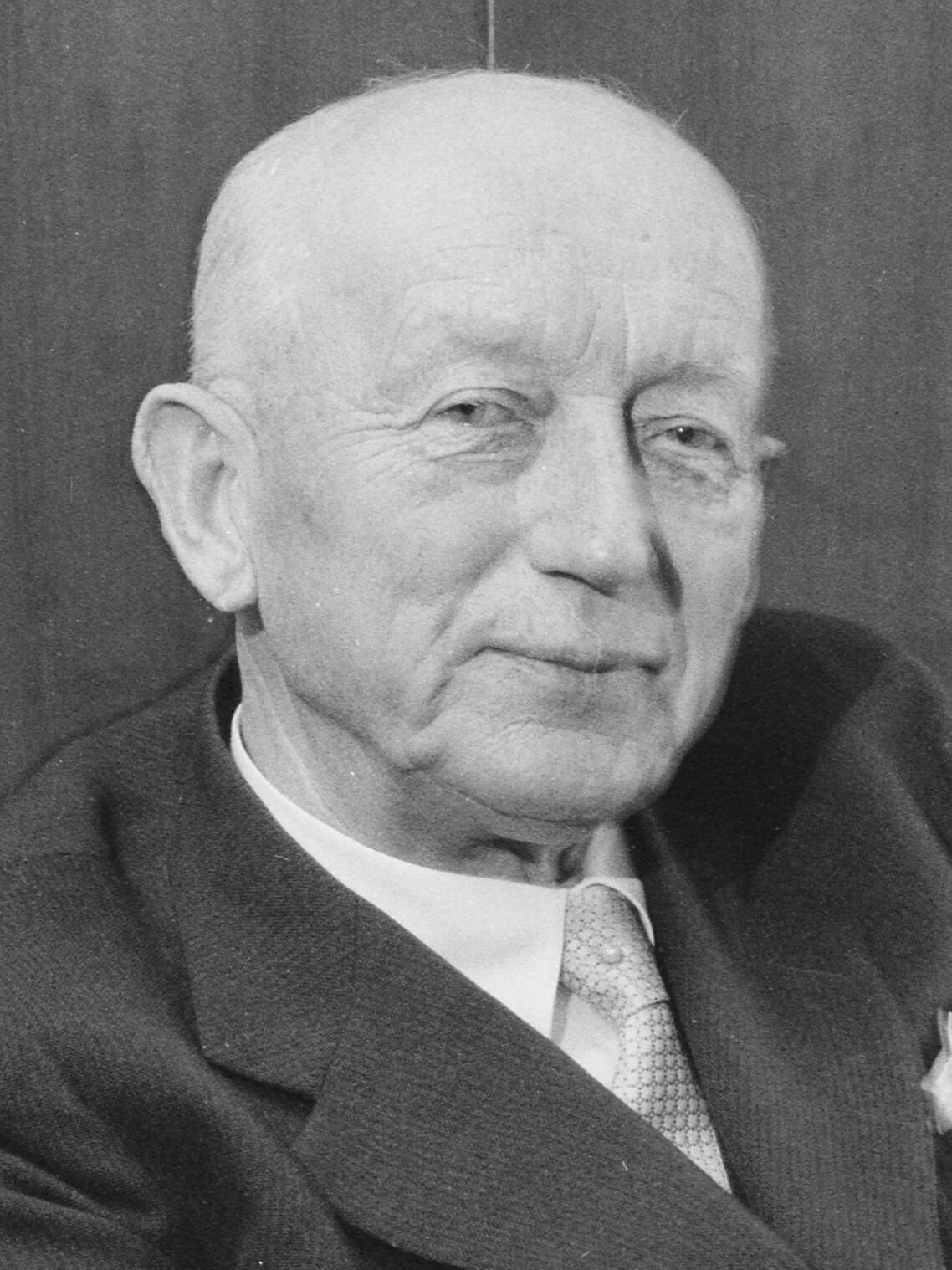

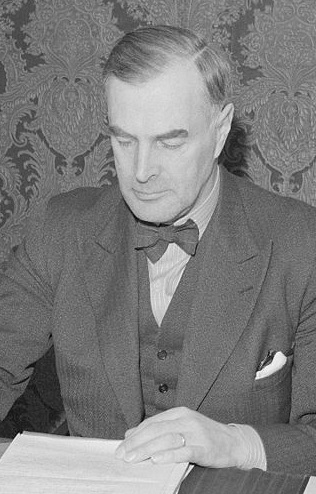

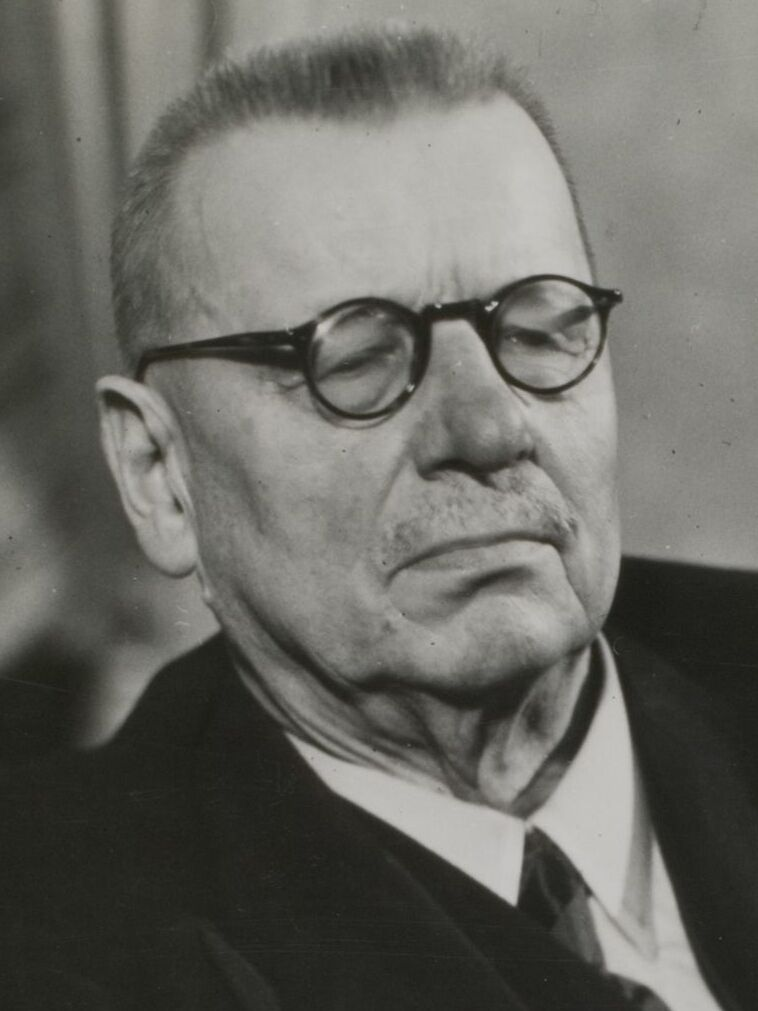

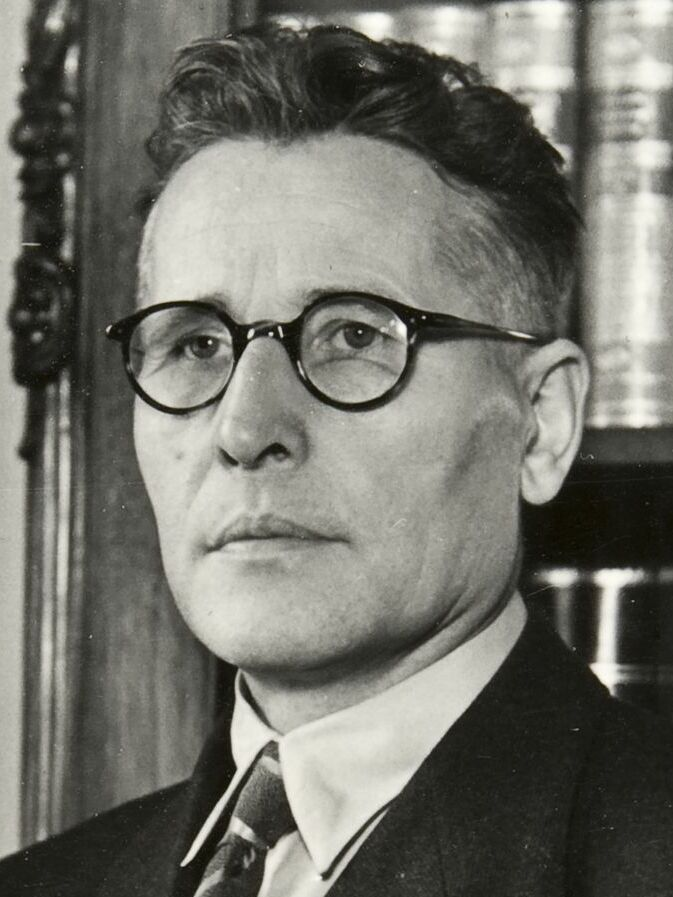

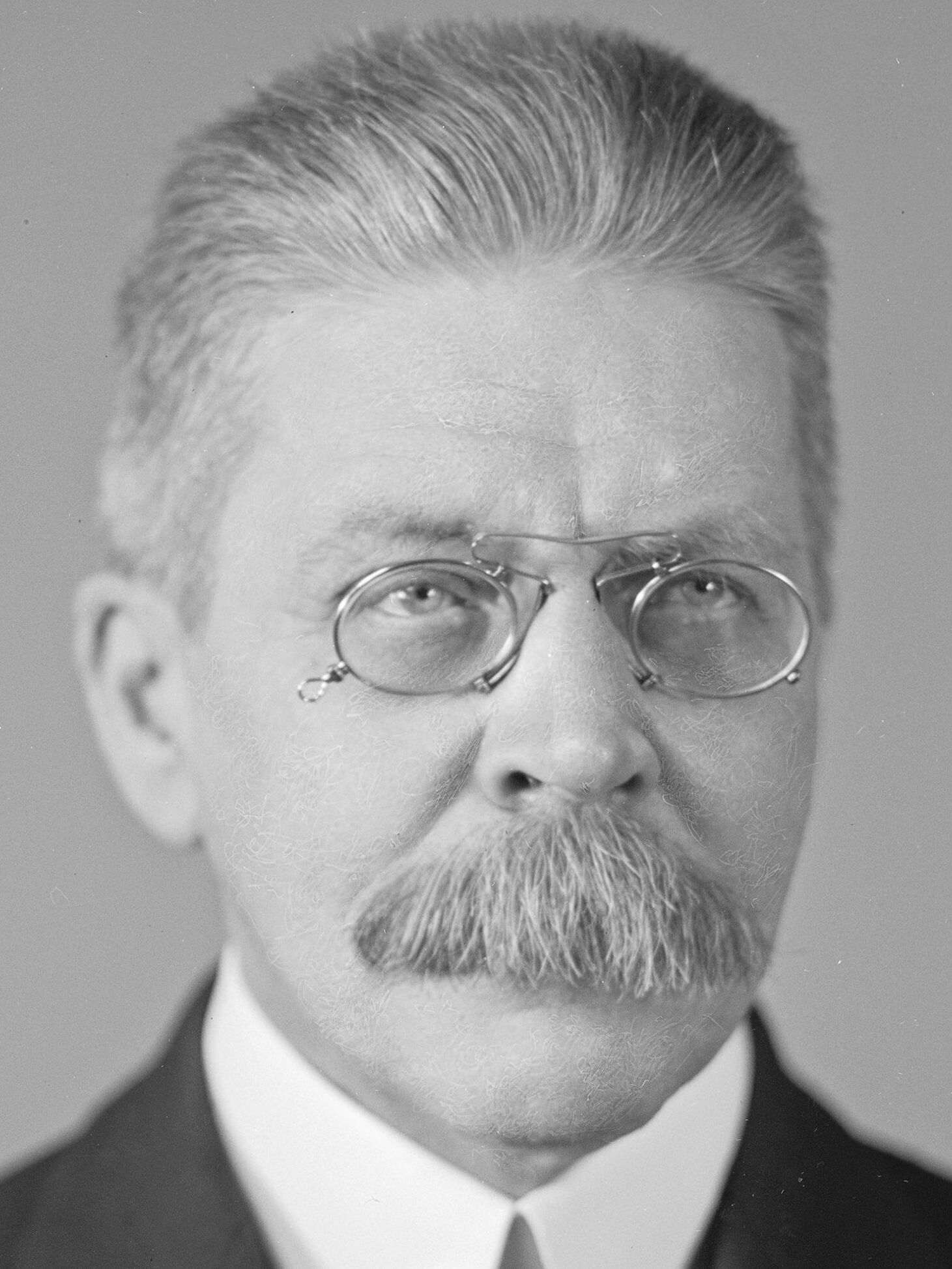

	First party	Second party	Third party
Leader	Kaarlo Harvala	Pekka Heikkinen	Ernst von Born
Party	SDP	Agrarian	RKP
Last election	37.33%, 78 seats	22.54%, 53 seats	10.42%, 21 seats
Seats won	83	53	21
Seat change	▲5	Steady	Steady
Popular vote	452,751	262,917	131,440
Percentage	38.59%	22.41%	11.20%
Swing	▲1.26pp	▼0.13pp	▲0.78pp
	Fourth party	Fifth party	Sixth party
Leader	Juho Kusti Paasikivi	Vilho Annala	Aimo Cajander
Party	National Coalition	IKL	National Progressive
Last election	16.93%, 32 seats	Alliance with National Coalition	7.41%, 11 seats
Seats won	20	14	7
Seat change	▼12	–	▼4
Popular vote	121,619	97,891	73,654
Percentage	10.36%	8.34%	6.28%
Swing	▼6.57pp	–	▲1.13pp
	Seventh party	Eighth party
Party	Small Farmers'	People's
Last election	3.39%, 3 seats	0.85%, 2 seats
Seats won	1	1
Seat change	▼2	▼1
Popular vote	23,159	7,449
Percentage	1.97%	0.63
Swing	▼1.42pp	▼0.22pp
Prime Minister before election
Toivo Mikael Kivimäki
National Progressive
Prime Minister after election
Toivo Mikael Kivimäki
National Progressive

Parliamentary elections were held in Finland on 1 and 2 July 1936. Following the election Prime Minister Toivo Mikael Kivimäki of the National Progressive Party was defeated in a confidence vote in September 1936 and resigned in October. Kyösti Kallio of the Agrarian League formed a centrist minority government after Pehr Evind Svinhufvud (National Coalition Party) refused to allow the Social Democrats to join the government. After Svinhufvud's defeat in the February 1937 presidential election, Kallio took office as the new President in March 1937, and he allowed the Social Democrats, Agrarians and Progressives to form the first centre-left or "red soil" ("red" for the Social Democrats and "soil" for the Agrarians) Finnish government. Aimo Cajander (Progressive) became Prime Minister, although the real strong men of the government were Finance Minister Väinö Tanner (Social Democrat) and Defence Minister Juho Niukkanen (Agrarian).

== Background ==
Finland had clearly recovered from the Great Depression since 1933, and unemployment had been almost eliminated. Prime Minister Kivimäki wanted to continue in office and to broaden his narrow right-wing minority government. The new Finnish economic prosperity, and the growing contacts between leading Agrarians and Social Democrats, made alternatives emerge for the Kivimäki government. For the first time in the history of independent Finland, an Agrarian-Social Democratic government began to be seriously discussed and planned. Despite its noisy and vigorous activity, the far-right Patriotic People's Movement remained small. Under the leadership of Juho Kusti Paasikivi, the National Coalitioners moved towards the political centre, and rejected calls for a new electoral alliance with the Patriotic People's Movement. The election results showed that the Finnish political democracy and its two leading moderate parties, the Social Democrats and Agrarians, had been strengthened. The Depression-based fringe parties, the Small Farmers' Party of Finland and the People's Party, lost most of their seats, while the Patriotic People's Movement remained at fourteen deputies, and the moderate right (National Coalitioners) gained two seats. The divided Progressives (Prime Minister Kivimäki led their right wing, and Professor Cajander led their left wing) lost four seats.

== Results ==
Party	Votes	%	Seats	+/–
Social Democratic Party	452,751	38.59	83	+5
Agrarian League	262,917	22.41	53	0
Swedish People's Party	131,440	11.20	21	0
National Coalition Party	121,619	10.36	20	+2
Patriotic People's Movement	97,891	8.34	14	0
National Progressive Party	73,654	6.28	7	–4
Small Farmers' Party	23,159	1.97	1	–2
People's Party	7,449	0.63	1	–1
Others	2,502	0.21	0	–
Total	1,173,382	100.00	200	0
Valid votes	1,173,382	99.57		
Invalid/blank votes	5,030	0.43		
Total votes	1,178,412	100.00		
Registered voters/turnout	1,872,908	62.92		
Source: Tilastokeskus 2004 Suomen virallinen tilasto
