= Kyösti Haataja =

Finnish politician (1881–1956)

Kyösti Haataja (19 February 1881 – 10 August 1956) was a twentieth century Finnish politician, born in Oulu. He was a member of the Parliament of Finland from 1916 to 1919 and again from 1929 to 1930.

He was a member of the National Coalition Party and was the chairman of the party between 1926 and 1932 following Hugo Suolahti. He died in Helsinki, aged 75.
