= 1927 Finnish parliamentary election =

General election

- 1–2 July 1927

All 200 seats in the Parliament of Finland 101 seats needed for a majority
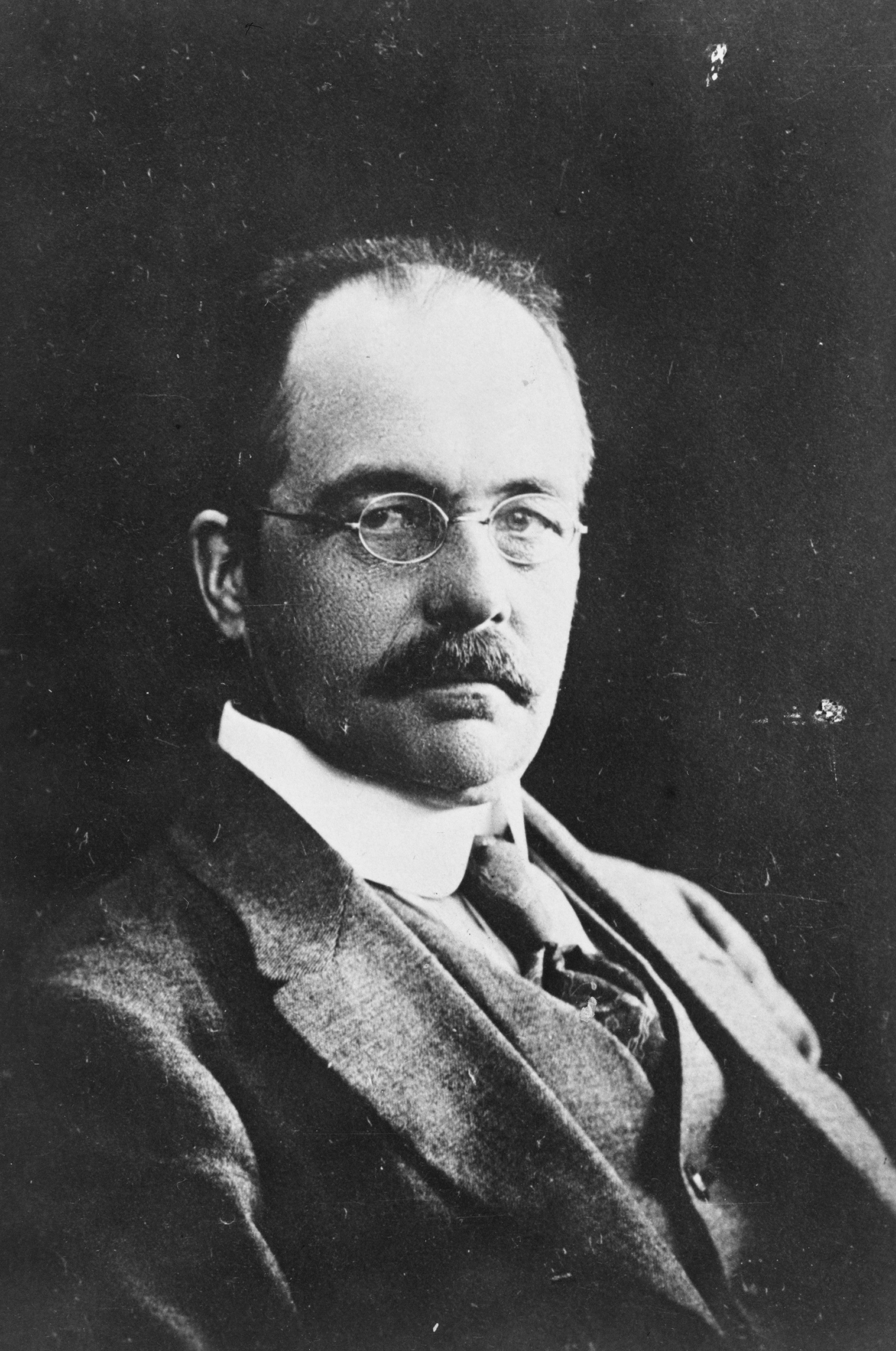

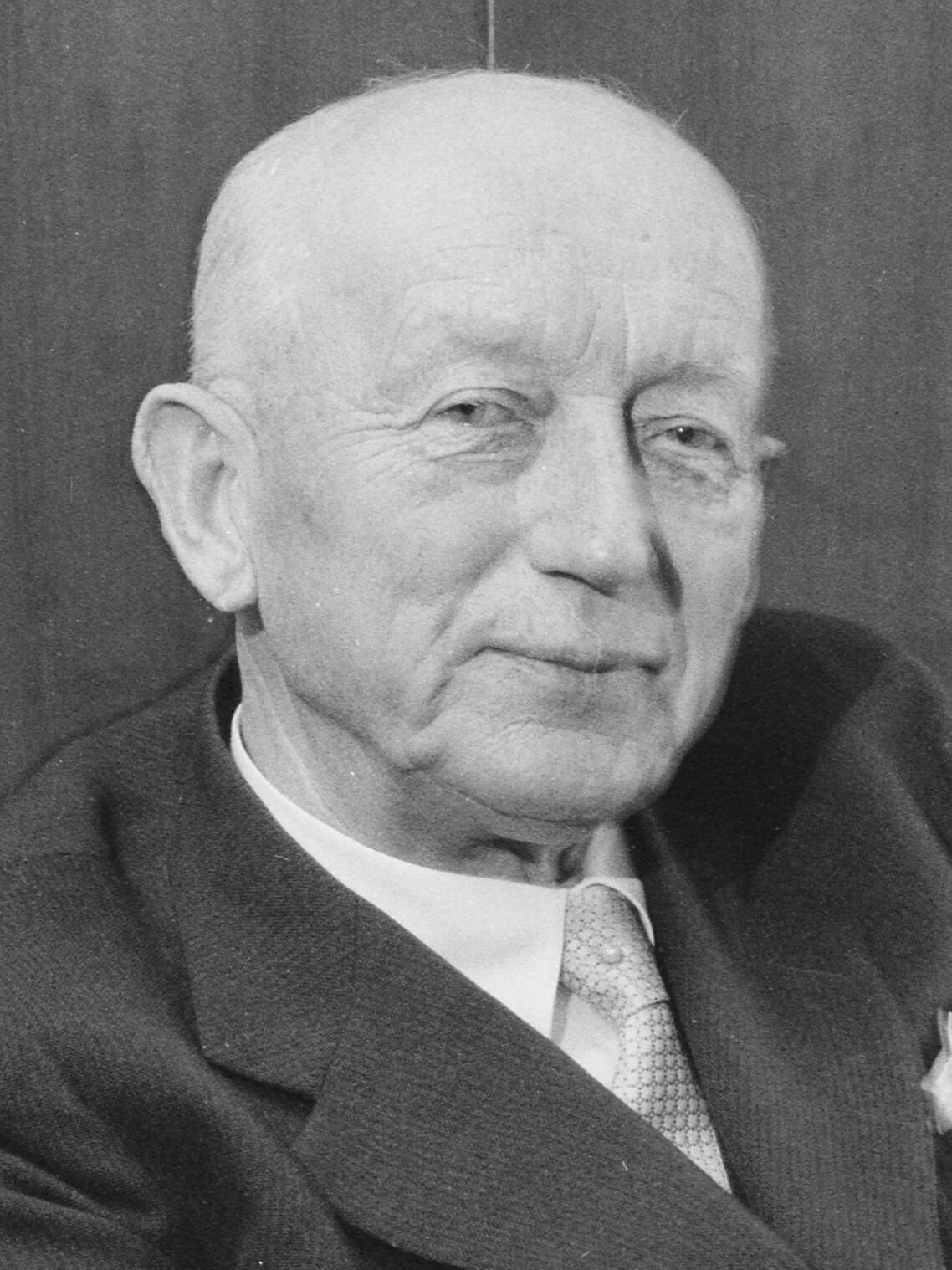

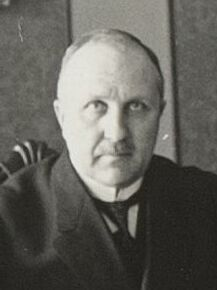

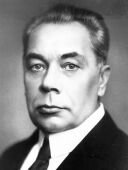
	First party	Second party	Third party
Leader	Matti Paasivuori	Pekka Heikkinen	Kyösti Haataja
Party	SDP	Agrarian	National Coalition
Last election	29.02%, 60 seats	20.25%, 44 seats	18.99%, 38 seats
Seats won	60	52	34
Seat change	Steady	▲8	▼4
Popular vote	257,572	205,313	161,450
Percentage	28.30%	22.56%	17.74%
Swing	▼0.72pp	▲2.31pp	▼1.25pp
	Fourth party	Fifth party	Sixth party
Leader	Eric von Rettig		Oskari Mantere
Party	RKP	STPV	National Progressive
Last election	12.03%, 23 seats	10.45%, 18 seats	9.09%, 17 seats
Seats won	24	20	10
Seat change	▲1	▲2	▼7
Popular vote	111,005	109,939	61,613
Percentage	12.20%	12.08%	6.77%
Swing	▲0.17pp	▲1.63pp	▼2.32pp
Prime Minister before election
Väinö Tanner
SDP
Prime Minister after election
Juho Sunila
Agrarian

Parliamentary elections were held in Finland on 1 and 2 July 1927. Although the Social Democratic Party remained the largest in Parliament with 60 of the 200 seats, Juho Sunila of the Agrarian League formed an Agrarian minority government in December 1927. It remained intact until December 1928. Voter turnout was 55.8%.

== Background ==
Finland was governed during the 1927 election by a Social Democratic minority government led by Väinö Tanner. President Lauri Kristian Relander, an Agrarian, had supported the establishment of that minority government, after the Agrarian Prime Minister Kyösti Kallio's first government had been defeated in a vote of confidence in November 1926. He had advised Tanner to prepare a liberal and moderate government programme, which the Agrarians and Progressives could support. In April 1927 President Relander caught a cold which developed into a life-threatening pneumonia. He had to go on sick leave, and Tanner became the Acting President. He even received the centre-right Civil Guards' (Suojeluskunnat in Finnish; a voluntary Finnish men's paramilitary defence organization) salute on the Defence Forces' Flag Day (then held on 16 May). The bourgeois (non-socialist) parties tried to get back into power by persuading enough Finnish voters to reject the Social Democratic minority government.

== Results ==
Party	Votes	%	Seats	+/–
Social Democratic Party	257,572	28.30	60	0
Agrarian League	205,313	22.56	52	+8
National Coalition Party	161,450	17.74	34	–4
Swedish People's Party	111,005	12.20	24	+1
Electoral Organisation of Socialist Workers and Smallholders	109,939	12.08	20	+2
National Progressive Party	61,613	6.77	10	–7
Peasants' List	1,341	0.15	0	0
Farmers' Party	784	0.09	0	New
Others	1,174	0.13	0	–
Total	910,191	100.00	200	0
Valid votes	910,191	99.54		
Invalid/blank votes	4,180	0.46		
Total votes	914,371	100.00		
Registered voters/turnout	1,719,567	53.17		
Source: Nohlen & Stöver. Tilastokeskus. Lackman
