= Kaarlo Harvala =

Finnish journalist and politician (1885–1942)

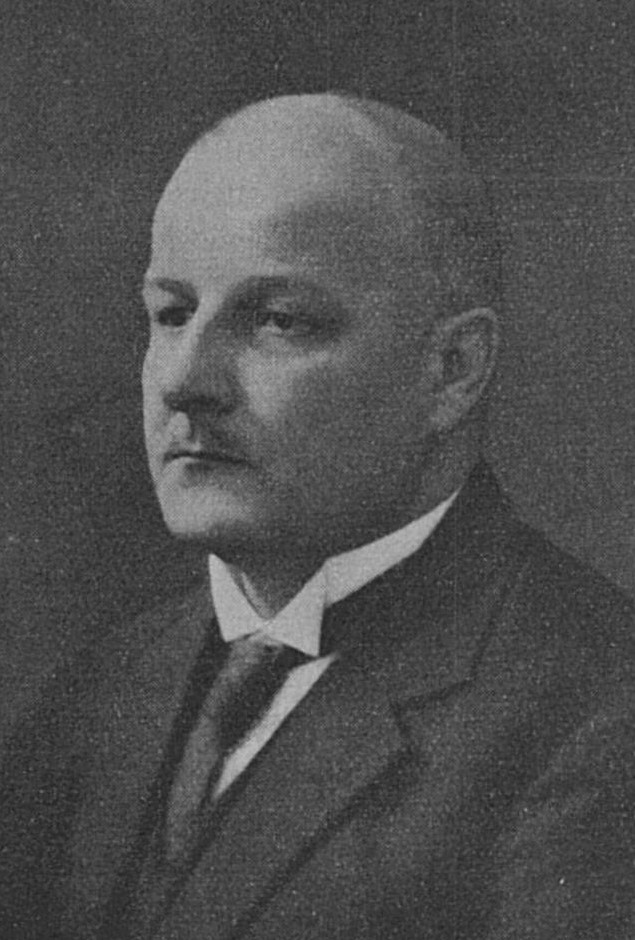

Leader of Social Democratic Party
- In office 1930 – 31 August 1942
- Preceded by: Matti Paasivuori

Personal details
- Born: 5 September 1885 Ruovesi
- Died: 31 August 1942 (aged 56) Helsinki
- Party: Social Democratic Party
- Occupation: Journalist

Kaarlo Harvala (1885–1942) was a Finnish journalist and politician who was among the chairmen of the Social Democratic Party. He held the post between 1930 and 1942. He was also a member of the Parliament of Finland.

== Biography ==
Harvala was born in Ruovesi on 5 September 1885. He was the secretary of the Union of Finnish Landlords in Tampere between 1912 and 1918. He was arrested in 1918 due to his political views. Following his release from prison he worked as an editor-in-chief of Kansan Sana newspaper and Kansan magazine in Tampere. Then he became the editor of Sosialist newspaper in Turku in 1919 and remained in the post until 1923.

He became a member of the Parliament on 5 September 1922 and served there until 31 August 1939. In 1930 he was elected as the leader of Social Democratic Party, replacing Matti Paasivuori in the post. Harvala remained in the post until he died in Helsinki on 31 August 1942.
