= Pekka Heikkinen =

Finnish farmer and politician

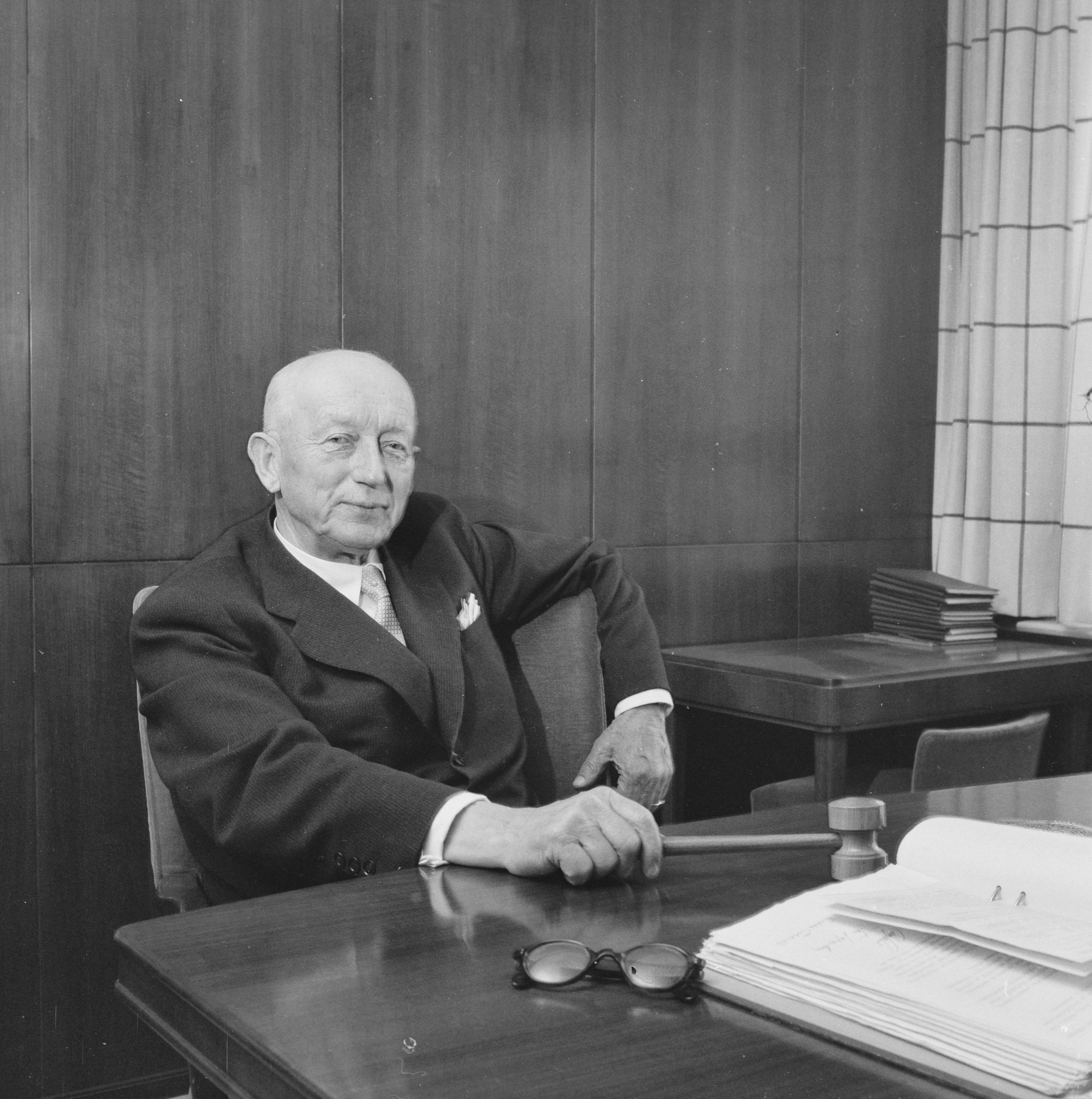
P.V. Heikkinen in 1958

Petter (Pekka) Wilhelm Heikkinen (24 April 1883 in Nilsiä – 4 February 1959) was a Finnish farmer and politician. He served as Minister of Trade and Industry from 17 December 1927 to 22 December 1928 and from 16 August 1929 to 4 July 1930, as Deputy Minister of Agriculture from 21 March 1931 to 14 December 1932 and as Minister of Agriculture from 7 October 1936 to 15 August 1940. He was a member of the Parliament of Finland from 1919 to 1922 and from 1924 to 1940, representing the Agrarian League. He served as the chairman of the Agrarian League from 1919 to 1940 and as Governor of Kuopio Province from 1940 to 1950.
