= Helsinki (parliamentary electoral district) =

Electoral district of the Parliament of Finland

- Helsingfors
- Electoral District for the Parliament of Finland
- Location of Helsinki within Finland
- Municipality: Helsinki
- Region: Uusimaa
- Population: 664,921 (2022)
- Electorate: 546,375 (2023)
- Area: 215 km^{2} (2022)

Current Electoral District
- Created: 1954
- Seats: List: 23 (2023–present); 22 (2015–2023); 21 (2003–2015); 20 (1999–2003); 19 (1995–1999); 20 (1979–1995); 21 (1975–1979); 22 (1970–1975); 21 (1966–1970); 20 (1962–1966); 19 (1954–1962)
- Members of Parliament: List: Eva Biaudet (SFP); Fatim Diarra (Vihr); Elisa Gebhard (SDP); Tuula Haatainen (SDP); Pekka Haavisto (Vihr); Jussi Halla-aho (PS); Timo Harakka (SDP); Atte Harjanne (Vihr); Eveliina Heinäluoma (SDP); Veronika Honkasalo (Vas); Atte Kaleva (Kok); Mai Kivelä (Vas); Minja Koskela (Vas); Terhi Koulumies (Kok); Jarmo Lindberg (Kok); Maria Ohisalo (Vihr); Mari Rantanen (PS); Nasima Razmyar (SDP); Wille Rydman (PS); Aura Salla (Kok); Sari Sarkomaa (Kok); Elina Valtonen (Kok); Ben Zyskowicz (Kok)
- Created from: Uusimaa Province

Helsinki (Swedish: Helsingfors) is one of the 13 electoral districts of the Parliament of Finland, the national legislature of Finland. The district was established as Helsinki City (Finnish: Helsingin kaupunki; Swedish: Helsingfors stad) in 1954 from parts of Uusimaa Province. It was renamed Helsinki in 1997. It is conterminous with the municipality of Helsinki. The district currently elects 23 of the 200 members of the Parliament of Finland using the open party-list proportional representation electoral system. At the 2023 parliamentary election it had 546,375 registered electors.

== History ==
The electoral district of Helsinki City was established in 1954 from parts of Uusimaa Province. The district was renamed Helsinki in 1997.

== Electoral system ==
Helsinki currently elects 23 of the 200 members of the Parliament of Finland using the open party-list proportional representation electoral system. Parties may form electoral alliances with each other to pool their votes and increase their chances of winning seats. However, the number of candidates nominated by an electoral alliance may not exceed the maximum number of candidates that a single party may nominate. Seats are allocated using the D'Hondt method.

== Election results ==
=== Summary ===
Election	Left Alliance Vas / SKDL			Green League Vihr			Social Democrats SDP			Swedish People's SFP			Centre Kesk / ML			Liberals Lib / LKP / SK			National Coalition Kok			Christian Democrats KD / SKL			Finns PS / SMP / SPP		
Election	Votes	%	Seats	Votes	%	Seats	Votes	%	Seats	Votes	%	Seats	Votes	%	Seats	Votes	%	Seats	Votes	%	Seats	Votes	%	Seats	Votes	%	Seats
2023	45,862	11.80%	3	59,479	15.31%	4	81,314	20.93%	5	19,679	5.07%	1	6,106	1.57%	0				102,592	26.41%	7	7,372	1.90%	0	43,872	11.29%	3
2019	42,899	11.13%	3	90,662	23.51%	6	52,393	13.59%	3	20,348	5.28%	1	11,015	2.86%	0				84,141	21.82%	6	7,253	1.88%	0	47,276	12.26%	3
2015	35,435	9.85%	2	67,806	18.84%	5	55,874	15.53%	4	24,645	6.85%	1	25,947	7.21%	1				93,392	25.95%	6	6,407	1.78%	0	40,583	11.28%	3
2011	36,332	10.44%	2	58,032	16.68%	4	60,921	17.51%	4	20,007	5.75%	1	15,672	4.50%	1				94,957	27.30%	6	8,262	2.37%	0	45,266	13.01%	3
2007	21,366	6.78%	1	63,440	20.14%	5	67,122	21.31%	5	18,894	6.00%	1	21,703	6.89%	1	1,416	0.45%	0	94,581	30.03%	8	7,903	2.51%	0	9,188	2.92%	0
2003	23,081	7.09%	1	59,775	18.37%	4	79,031	24.29%	6	22,926	7.04%	1	26,435	8.12%	2	2,409	0.74%	0	78,019	23.97%	6	11,206	3.44%	0	17,342	5.33%	1
1999	21,982	7.31%	1	51,587	17.15%	4	68,885	22.91%	5	27,227	9.05%	2	18,343	6.10%	1	308	0.10%	0	86,448	28.75%	7	8,482	2.82%	0	365	0.12%	0
1995	26,151	8.91%	2	41,588	14.18%	3	78,586	26.79%	6	29,419	10.03%	2	10,953	3.73%	0	692	0.24%	0	70,036	23.88%	5	5,545	1.89%	0	1,368	0.47%	0
1991	22,958	8.32%	2	38,199	13.84%	3	57,843	20.95%	5	28,559	10.34%	2	16,620	6.02%	1	1,001	0.36%	0	75,519	27.35%	6	7,825	2.83%	1	4,964	1.80%	0
1987	23,392	7.95%	1	26,440	8.98%	2	71,412	24.26%	6	29,132	9.90%	3	6,177	2.10%	0	3,794	1.29%	0	91,258	31.00%	7	8,113	2.76%	1	8,342	2.83%	0
1983	40,218	13.05%	2	14,138	4.59%	1	83,406	27.06%	6	24,750	8.03%	2	15,660	5.08%	1				91,919	29.83%	6	7,484	2.43%	0	21,381	6.94%	1
1979	51,164	16.67%	3				78,973	25.73%	6	22,309	7.27%	2	10,972	3.57%	0	16,762	5.46%	1	90,973	29.64%	7	14,853	4.84%	1	6,626	2.16%	0
1975	56,641	18.15%	4				85,529	27.41%	6	26,498	8.49%	3	7,659	2.45%	0	24,049	7.71%	2	75,254	24.12%	4	8,969	2.87%	1	4,269	1.37%	0
1972	48,883	15.91%	4				90,178	29.34%	7	34,147	11.11%	2	5,314	1.73%	0	26,353	8.58%	2	79,772	25.96%	6	9,406	3.06%	0	10,373	3.38%	1
1970	46,483	15.05%	4				84,301	27.29%	6	36,539	11.83%	3	5,619	1.82%	0	29,661	9.60%	2	85,762	27.76%	7	4,423	1.43%	0	11,738	3.80%	0
1966	51,975	18.18%	4				92,807	32.46%	7	36,953	12.92%	3	7,945	2.78%	0	34,453	12.05%	2	52,201	18.26%	4	1,874	0.66%	0			
1962	51,087	19.26%	4				55,508	20.93%	4	38,052	14.35%	3	911	0.34%	0	36,919	13.92%	3	58,883	22.20%	4				600	0.23%	0
1958	40,983	19.41%	4				48,345	22.90%	4	33,476	15.86%	3	919	0.44%	0	24,801	11.75%	2	48,916	23.17%	5	2,093	0.99%	0			
1954	42,823	19.31%	4				64,499	29.08%	6	35,722	16.11%	3	703	0.32%	0	37,147	16.75%	3	38,552	17.38%	3						

(Figures in italics represent joint lists.)

=== Detailed ===
==== 2020s ====
===== 2023 =====
Results of the 2023 parliamentary election held on 2 April 2023:

Party		Party			Electoral Alliance		
Party		Votes	%	Seats	Votes	%	Seats
National Coalition Party	Kok	102,592	26.41%	7	102,592	26.41%	7
Social Democratic Party of Finland	SDP	81,314	20.93%	5	81,314	20.93%	5
Green League	Vihr	59,479	15.31%	4	59,479	15.31%	4
Left Alliance	Vas	45,862	11.80%	3	45,862	11.80%	3
Finns Party	PS	43,872	11.29%	3	43,872	11.29%	3
Swedish People's Party of Finland	SFP	19,679	5.07%	1	19,679	5.07%	1
Christian Democrats	KD	7,372	1.90%	0	14,225	3.66%	0
Centre Party	Kesk	6,106	1.57%	0	14,225	3.66%	0
Finnish Reform Movement	KL	747	0.19%	0	14,225	3.66%	0
Movement Now	Liik	8,944	2.30%	0	8,944	2.30%	0
Freedom Alliance	VL	2,970	0.76%	0	3,799	0.98%	0
Crystal Party	KRIP	605	0.16%	0	3,799	0.98%	0
Finnish People First	SKE	224	0.06%	0	3,799	0.98%	0
Liberal Party – Freedom to Choose	Lib	3,539	0.91%	0	3,539	0.91%	0
Pirate Party	Pir	1,274	0.33%	0	1,274	0.33%	0
Animal Justice Party of Finland	EOP	697	0.18%	0	1,255	0.32%	0
Feminist Party	FP	558	0.14%	0	1,255	0.32%	0
Power Belongs to the People	VKK	985	0.25%	0	985	0.25%	0
The Open Party	AP	949	0.24%	0	949	0.24%	0
Communist Party of Finland	SKP	710	0.18%	0	710	0.18%	0
Jyrki Helminen (Independent)		23	0.01%	0	23	0.01%	0
Valid votes		388,501	100.00%	23	388,501	100.00%	23
Rejected votes		2,979	0.76%				
Total polled		391,480	71.65%				
Registered electors		546,375					

The following candidates were elected: Eva Biaudet (SFP), 5,195 votes; Fatim Diarra (Vihr), 6,774 votes; Elisa Gebhard (SDP), 5,872 votes; Tuula Haatainen (SDP), 9,667 votes; Pekka Haavisto (Vihr), 8,036 votes; Jussi Halla-aho (PS), 22,081 votes; Timo Harakka (SDP), 7,154 votes; Atte Harjanne (Vihr), 5,804 votes; Eveliina Heinäluoma (SDP), 15,837 votes; Veronika Honkasalo (Vas), 6,100 votes; Atte Kaleva (Kok), 4,913 votes; Mai Kivelä (Vas), 6,177 votes; Minja Koskela (Vas), 10,112 votes; Terhi Koulumies (Kok), 6,512 votes; Jarmo Lindberg (Kok), 6,056 votes; Maria Ohisalo (Vihr), 6,937 votes; Mari Rantanen (PS), 3,826 votes; Nasima Razmyar (SDP), 14,108 votes; Wille Rydman (PS), 3,919 votes; Aura Salla (Kok), 4,189 votes; Sari Sarkomaa (Kok), 5,840 votes; Elina Valtonen (Kok), 32,562 votes; and Ben Zyskowicz (Kok), 12,603 votes.

==== 2010s ====
===== 2019 =====
Results of the 2019 parliamentary election held on 14 April 2019:

Party		Party			Electoral Alliance		
Party		Votes	%	Seats	Votes	%	Seats
Green League	Vihr	90,662	23.51%	6	90,662	23.51%	6
National Coalition Party	Kok	84,141	21.82%	6	84,141	21.82%	6
Social Democratic Party of Finland	SDP	52,393	13.59%	3	52,393	13.59%	3
Finns Party	PS	47,276	12.26%	3	47,276	12.26%	3
Left Alliance	Vas	42,899	11.13%	3	42,899	11.13%	3
Swedish People's Party of Finland	SFP	20,348	5.28%	1	20,348	5.28%	1
Movement Now	Liik	13,529	3.51%	0	13,529	3.51%	0
Pirate Party	Pir	5,840	1.51%	0	11,312	2.93%	0
Feminist Party	FP	3,303	0.86%	0	11,312	2.93%	0
Liberal Party – Freedom to Choose	Lib	1,248	0.32%	0	11,312	2.93%	0
Animal Justice Party of Finland	EOP	921	0.24%	0	11,312	2.93%	0
Centre Party	Kesk	11,015	2.86%	0	11,015	2.86%	0
Christian Democrats	KD	7,253	1.88%	0	7,253	1.88%	0
Blue Reform	SIN	2,056	0.53%	0	2,056	0.53%	0
Seven Star Movement	TL	1,285	0.33%	0	1,285	0.33%	0
Communist Party of Finland	SKP	604	0.16%	0	604	0.16%	0
Finnish People First	SKE	347	0.09%	0	372	0.10%	0
Citizens' Party	KP	25	0.01%	0	372	0.10%	0
Independence Party	IPU	203	0.05%	0	203	0.05%	0
Communist Workers' Party – For Peace and Socialism	KTP	145	0.04%	0	145	0.04%	0
Jyrki Helminen (Independent)		67	0.02%	0	67	0.02%	0
Valid votes		385,560	100.00%	22	385,560	100.00%	22
Rejected votes		3,204	0.82%				
Total polled		388,764	71.88%				
Registered electors		540,883					

The following candidates were elected: Outi Alanko-Kahiluoto (Vihr), 5,961 votes; Paavo Arhinmäki (Vas), 6,775 votes; Eva Biaudet (SFP), 5,446 votes; Tuula Haatainen (SDP), 11,100 votes; Pekka Haavisto (Vihr), 20,163 votes; Jussi Halla-aho (PS), 30,596 votes; Atte Harjanne (Vihr), 4,795 votes; Eveliina Heinäluoma (SDP), 9,465 votes; Mari Holopainen (Vihr), 7,094 votes; Veronika Honkasalo (Vas), 5,846 votes; Emma Kari (Vihr), 6,716 votes; Mai Kivelä (Vas), 6,790 votes; Terhi Koulumies (Kok), 7,233 votes; Maria Ohisalo (Vihr), 11,897 votes; Tom Packalén (PS), 2,028 votes; Jaana Pelkonen (KoK), 10,563 votes; Mari Rantanen (PS), 2,924 votes; Wille Rydman (KoK), 5,910 votes; Sari Sarkomaa (Kok), 6,806 votes; Erkki Tuomioja (SDP), 5,044 votes; Juhana Vartiainen (Kok), 8,206 votes; and Ben Zyskowicz (Kok), 12,556 votes.

===== 2015 =====
Results of the 2015 parliamentary election held on 19 April 2015:

Party		Party			Electoral Alliance		
Party		Votes	%	Seats	Votes	%	Seats
National Coalition Party	Kok	93,392	25.95%	6	93,392	25.95%	6
Green League	Vihr	67,806	18.84%	5	67,806	18.84%	5
Social Democratic Party of Finland	SDP	55,874	15.53%	4	55,874	15.53%	4
True Finns	PS	40,583	11.28%	3	40,583	11.28%	3
Left Alliance	Vas	35,435	9.85%	2	35,435	9.85%	2
Centre Party	Kesk	25,947	7.21%	1	25,947	7.21%	1
Swedish People's Party of Finland	SFP	24,645	6.85%	1	24,645	6.85%	1
Christian Democrats	KD	6,407	1.78%	0	6,735	1.87%	0
For the Poor		328	0.09%	0	6,735	1.87%	0
Pirate Party	Pir	5,119	1.42%	0	5,119	1.42%	0
Communist Party of Finland	SKP	1,485	0.41%	0	1,485	0.41%	0
Independence Party	IPU	1,242	0.35%	0	1,242	0.35%	0
Change 2011		480	0.13%	0	480	0.13%	0
Kristiina Kreisler (Independent)		314	0.09%	0	314	0.09%	0
Workers' Party of Finland	STP	244	0.07%	0	244	0.07%	0
Jani Leinonen (Independent)		168	0.05%	0	168	0.05%	0
Kim Sjöström (Independent)		114	0.03%	0	114	0.03%	0
Yakup Yilmaz (Independent)		93	0.03%	0	93	0.03%	0
Communist Workers' Party – For Peace and Socialism	KTP	76	0.02%	0	76	0.02%	0
Ville Punto (Independent)		73	0.02%	0	73	0.02%	0
Jyrki Helminen (Independent)		38	0.01%	0	38	0.01%	0
Jaakko Katajisto (Independent)		12	0.00%	0	12	0.00%	0
Valid votes		359,875	100.00%	22	359,875	100.00%	22
Rejected votes		2,372	0.65%				
Total polled		362,247	69.41%				
Registered electors		521,875					

The following candidates were elected: Outi Alanko-Kahiluoto (Vihr), 7,884 votes; Paavo Arhinmäki (Vas), 7,910 votes; Eva Biaudet (SFP), 5,515 votes; Tuula Haatainen (SDP), 6,662 votes; Pekka Haavisto (Vihr), 14,204 votes; Eero Heinäluoma (SDP), 9,703 votes; Emma Kari (Vihr), 4,647 votes; Silvia Modig (Vas), 6,190 votes; Tom Packalén (PS), 5,089 votes; Jaana Pelkonen (KoK), 15,964 votes; Mika Raatikainen (PS), 3,370 votes; Nasima Razmyar (SDP), 5,156 votes; Olli Rehn (Kesk), 6,837 votes; Wille Rydman (KoK), 4,524 votes; Pertti Salolainen (KoK), 4,502 votes; Sari Sarkomaa (Kok), 7,052 votes; Sampo Terho (PS), 10,067 votes; Erkki Tuomioja (SDP), 11,154 votes; Antero Vartia (Vihr), 6,859 votes; Juhana Vartiainen (Kok), 11,436 votes; Ozan Yanar (Vihr), 4,196 votes; and Ben Zyskowicz (Kok), 15,395 votes.

===== 2011 =====
Results of the 2011 parliamentary election held on 17 April 2011:

Party		Party			Electoral Alliance		
Party		Votes	%	Seats	Votes	%	Seats
National Coalition Party	Kok	94,957	27.30%	6	94,957	27.30%	6
Social Democratic Party of Finland	SDP	60,921	17.51%	4	60,921	17.51%	4
Green League	Vihr	58,032	16.68%	4	58,032	16.68%	4
True Finns	PS	45,266	13.01%	3	45,266	13.01%	3
Left Alliance	Vas	36,332	10.44%	2	36,332	10.44%	2
Swedish People's Party of Finland	SFP	20,007	5.75%	1	20,007	5.75%	1
Centre Party	Kesk	15,672	4.50%	1	15,672	4.50%	1
Christian Democrats	KD	8,262	2.37%	0	8,658	2.49%	0
For the Poor		396	0.11%	0	8,658	2.49%	0
Pirate Party	Pir	2,974	0.85%	0	2,974	0.85%	0
Communist Party of Finland	SKP	1,797	0.52%	0	1,797	0.52%	0
Change 2011		912	0.26%	0	912	0.26%	0
Senior Citizens' Party		827	0.24%	0	827	0.24%	0
Workers' Party of Finland	STP	750	0.22%	0	750	0.22%	0
Independence Party	IPU	406	0.12%	0	406	0.12%	0
Communist Workers' Party – For Peace and Socialism	KTP	136	0.04%	0	136	0.04%	0
Mikko Laajola (Independent)		82	0.02%	0	82	0.02%	0
Jyrki Helminen (Independent)		74	0.02%	0	74	0.02%	0
Juho Korhonen (Independent)		47	0.01%	0	47	0.01%	0
Freedom Party – Finland's Future	VP	35	0.01%	0	35	0.01%	0
Valid votes		347,885	100.00%	21	347,885	100.00%	21
Rejected votes		2,084	0.60%				
Total polled		349,969	70.05%				
Registered electors		499,581					

The following candidates were elected: Outi Alanko-Kahiluoto (Vihr), 5,240 votes; Paavo Arhinmäki (Vas), 17,226 votes; Pekka Haavisto (Vihr), 7,470 votes; Jussi Halla-aho (PS), 15,074 votes; Eero Heinäluoma (SDP), 9,501 votes; Rakel Hiltunen (SDP), 4,882 votes; Mari Kiviniemi (Kesk), 8,812 votes; Päivi Lipponen (SDP), 4,381 votes; Lasse Männistö (Kok), 4,866 votes; Silvia Modig (Vas), 4,681 votes; Tom Packalén (PS), 4,380 votes; Jaana Pelkonen (KoK), 5,897 votes; Pertti Salolainen (KoK), 6,205 votes; Sari Sarkomaa (Kok), 7,457 votes; Anni Sinnemäki (Vihr), 7,513 votes; Osmo Soininvaara (Vihr), 8,285 votes; Astrid Thors (SFP), 4,983 votes; Erkki Tuomioja (SDP), 9,970 votes; Juha Väätäinen (PS), 2,914 votes; Jan Vapaavuori (Kok), 11,203 votes; and Ben Zyskowicz (Kok), 13,407 votes.

==== 2000s ====
===== 2007 =====
Results of the 2007 parliamentary election held on 18 March 2007:

Party		Party			Electoral Alliance		
Party		Votes	%	Seats	Votes	%	Seats
National Coalition Party	Kok	94,581	30.03%	8	94,581	30.03%	8
Social Democratic Party of Finland	SDP	67,122	21.31%	5	67,122	21.31%	5
Green League	Vihr	63,440	20.14%	5	63,440	20.14%	5
Centre Party	Kesk	21,703	6.89%	1	21,703	6.89%	1
Left Alliance	Vas	21,366	6.78%	1	21,366	6.78%	1
Swedish People's Party of Finland	SFP	18,894	6.00%	1	18,894	6.00%	1
True Finns	PS	9,188	2.92%	0	9,415	2.99%	0
Independence Party	IPU	227	0.07%	0	9,415	2.99%	0
Christian Democrats	KD	7,903	2.51%	0	8,796	2.79%	0
For the Poor		893	0.28%	0	8,796	2.79%	0
Communist Party of Finland	SKP	4,495	1.43%	0	4,495	1.43%	0
Pensioners for People		2,355	0.75%	0	2,355	0.75%	0
Liberals	Lib	1,416	0.45%	0	1,416	0.45%	0
Workers' Party of Finland	STP	687	0.22%	0	687	0.22%	0
Finnish People's Blue-Whites	SKS	224	0.07%	0	224	0.07%	0
Communist Workers' Party – For Peace and Socialism	KTP	150	0.05%	0	150	0.05%	0
Tomi Juhani Syväoja (Independent)		97	0.03%	0	97	0.03%	0
Ville Samuli Hänninen (Independent)		80	0.03%	0	80	0.03%	0
Marijan Vitomir Basic (Independent)		58	0.02%	0	58	0.02%	0
Eero Johannes Varje (Independent)		45	0.01%	0	45	0.01%	0
Valid votes		314,924	100.00%	21	314,924	100.00%	21
Rejected votes		3,321	1.04%				
Total polled		318,245	66.12%				
Registered electors		481,302					

The following candidates were elected: Outi Alanko-Kahiluoto (Vihr), 4,622 votes; Paavo Arhinmäki (Vas), 6,859 votes; Sirpa Asko-Seljavaara (Kok), 6,293 votes; Tuija Brax (Vihr), 9,692 votes; Tuula Haatainen (SDP), 6,686 votes; Pekka Haavisto (Vihr), 5,418 votes; Juha Hakola (Kok), 4,258 votes; Eero Heinäluoma (SDP), 10,948 votes; Rakel Hiltunen (SDP), 6,205 votes; Arja Karhuvaara (Kok), 4,069 votes; Mari Kiviniemi (Kesk), 7,385 votes; Päivi Lipponen (SDP), 4,202 votes; Sanna Perkiö (Kok), 5,639 votes; Pertti Salolainen (KoK), 8,621 votes; Sari Sarkomaa (Kok), 9,155 votes; Anni Sinnemäki (Vihr), 7,694 votes; Johanna Sumuvuori (Vihr), 5,173 votes; Astrid Thors (SFP), 5,938 votes; Erkki Tuomioja (SDP), 12,894 votes; Jan Vapaavuori (Kok), 9,091 votes; and Ben Zyskowicz (Kok), 17,607 votes.

===== 2003 =====
Results of the 2003 parliamentary election held on 16 March 2003:

Party		Party			Electoral Alliance		
Party		Votes	%	Seats	Votes	%	Seats
Social Democratic Party of Finland	SDP	79,031	24.29%	6	79,031	24.29%	6
National Coalition Party	Kok	78,019	23.97%	6	78,019	23.97%	6
Green League	Vihr	59,775	18.37%	4	59,775	18.37%	4
Centre Party	Kesk	26,435	8.12%	2	26,435	8.12%	2
Left Alliance	Vas	23,081	7.09%	1	23,081	7.09%	1
Swedish People's Party of Finland	SFP	22,926	7.04%	1	22,926	7.04%	1
True Finns	PS	17,342	5.33%	1	20,669	6.35%	1
Liberals	Lib	2,409	0.74%	0	20,669	6.35%	1
Pensioners for People		788	0.24%	0	20,669	6.35%	1
Kirjava ”Puolue” – Elonkehän Puolesta	KIPU	130	0.04%	0	20,669	6.35%	1
Christian Democrats	KD	11,206	3.44%	0	11,206	3.44%	0
Communist Party of Finland	SKP	2,052	0.63%	0	2,052	0.63%	0
Forces for Change in Finland		1,284	0.39%	0	1,284	0.39%	0
Heikki Rosti (Independent)		401	0.12%	0	401	0.12%	0
Communist Workers' Party – For Peace and Socialism	KTP	245	0.08%	0	245	0.08%	0
Finland Rises – People Unites		185	0.06%	0	185	0.06%	0
Joint Responsibility Party		77	0.02%	0	77	0.02%	0
Ossi Eskola (Independent)		42	0.01%	0	42	0.01%	0
Valid votes		325,428	100.00%	21	325,428	100.00%	21
Rejected votes		2,719	0.83%				
Total polled		328,147	68.78%				
Registered electors		477,094					

The following candidates were elected: Sirpa Asko-Seljavaara (Kok), 6,982 votes; Eva Biaudet (SFP), 7,868 votes; Tuija Brax (Vihr), 7,747 votes; Arto Bryggare (SDP), 4,786 votes; Tuula Haatainen (SDP), 9,341 votes; Tony Halme (PS), 16,390 votes; Leena Harkimo (Kok), 6,690 votes; Rakel Hiltunen (SDP), 7,788 votes; Anneli Jäätteenmäki (Kesk), 15,704 votes; Irina Krohn (Vihr), 4,698 votes; Jere Lahti (Kok), 5,257 votes; Paavo Lipponen (SDP), 26,415 votes; Outi Ojala (Vas), 6,658 votes; Pertti Salovaara (Kesk), 1,600 votes; Sari Sarkomaa (Kok), 5,355 votes; Anni Sinnemäki (Vihr), 4,154 votes; Osmo Soininvaara (Vihr), 11,341 votes; Ilkka Taipale (SDP), 4,090 votes; Erkki Tuomioja (SDP), 9,548 votes; Jan Vapaavuori (Kok), 4,657 votes; and Ben Zyskowicz (Kok), 12,780 votes.

==== 1990s ====
===== 1999 =====
Results of the 1999 parliamentary election held on 21 March 1999:

Party		Party			Electoral Alliance		
Party		Votes	%	Seats	Votes	%	Seats
National Coalition Party	Kok	86,448	28.75%	7	86,448	28.75%	7
Social Democratic Party of Finland	SDP	68,885	22.91%	5	68,885	22.91%	5
Green League	Vihr	51,587	17.15%	4	51,587	17.15%	4
Swedish People's Party of Finland	SFP	27,227	9.05%	2	27,227	9.05%	2
Left Alliance	Vas	21,982	7.31%	1	21,982	7.31%	1
Centre Party	Kesk	18,343	6.10%	1	18,343	6.10%	1
Finnish Christian League	SKL	8,482	2.82%	0	11,995	3.99%	0
Alliance for Free Finland	VSL	1,693	0.56%	0	11,995	3.99%	0
Pensioners' Party	SEP	980	0.33%	0	11,995	3.99%	0
Kirjava ”Puolue” – Elonkehän Puolesta	KIPU	475	0.16%	0	11,995	3.99%	0
True Finns	PS	365	0.12%	0	11,995	3.99%	0
Young Finns	Nuors	7,250	2.41%	0	7,558	2.51%	0
Liberal People's Party	LKP	308	0.10%	0	7,558	2.51%	0
Reform Group	Rem	2,734	0.91%	0	2,734	0.91%	0
Communist Party of Finland	SKP	1,925	0.64%	0	2,515	0.84%	0
Communist Workers' Party – For Peace and Socialism	KTP	590	0.20%	0	2,515	0.84%	0
Pensioners for People	EKA	693	0.23%	0	693	0.23%	0
Natural Law Party	LLP	560	0.19%	0	560	0.19%	0
Päivi Elovuori (Independent)		145	0.05%	0	145	0.05%	0
Sami Chehab (Independent)		40	0.01%	0	40	0.01%	0
Valid votes		300,712	100.00%	20	300,712	100.00%	20
Rejected votes		3,252	1.07%				
Total polled		303,964	65.35%				
Registered electors		465,134					

The following candidates were elected: Esko Aho (Kesk), 11,869 votes; Pirjo-Riitta Antvuori (Kok), 4,210 votes; Eva Biaudet (SFP), 10,362 votes; Tuija Brax (Vihr), 11,587 votes; Klaus Bremer (SFP), 5,386 votes; Tuula Haatainen (SDP), 5,258 votes; Tarja Halonen (SDP), 15,817 votes; Rakel Hiltunen (SDP), 4,392 votes; Seppo Kanerva (Kok), 4,283 votes; Paula Kokkonen (Kok), 5,102 votes; Irina Krohn (Vihr), 7,616 votes; Paavo Lipponen (SDP), 11,823 votes; Sauli Niinistö (Kok), 30,450 votes; Outi Ojala (Vas), 6,503 votes; Kirsi Piha (Kok), 7,391 votes; Sari Sarkomaa (Kok), 3,151 votes; Anni Sinnemäki (Vihr), 4,781 votes; Osmo Soininvaara (Vihr), 8,122 votes; Erkki Tuomioja (SDP), 7,214 votes; and Ben Zyskowicz (Kok), 13,338 votes.

===== 1995 =====
Results of the 1995 parliamentary election held on 19 March 1995:

Party		Party			Electoral Alliance		
Party		Votes	%	Seats	Votes	%	Seats
Social Democratic Party of Finland	SDP	78,586	26.79%	6	78,586	26.79%	6
National Coalition Party	Kok	70,036	23.88%	5	70,036	23.88%	5
Green League	Vihr	41,588	14.18%	3	41,588	14.18%	3
Swedish People's Party of Finland	SFP	29,419	10.03%	2	30,111	10.26%	2
Liberal People's Party	LKP	692	0.24%	0	30,111	10.26%	2
Left Alliance	Vas	26,151	8.91%	2	26,151	8.91%	2
Young Finns	Nuor	17,513	5.97%	1	17,513	5.97%	1
Centre Party	Kesk	10,953	3.73%	0	10,953	3.73%	0
Finnish Christian League	SKL	5,545	1.89%	0	10,001	3.41%	0
Women's Party	NAISP	2,309	0.79%	0	10,001	3.41%	0
Finnish Rural Party	SMP	1,368	0.47%	0	10,001	3.41%	0
Pensioners' Party	SEP	779	0.27%	0	10,001	3.41%	0
Alliance for Free Finland	VSL	3,702	1.26%	0	3,702	1.26%	0
Natural Law Party	LLP	1,957	0.67%	0	1,957	0.67%	0
Pensioners for People	ELKA	732	0.25%	0	1,376	0.47%	0
Communist Workers' Party – For Peace and Socialism	KTP	644	0.22%	0	1,376	0.47%	0
Joint Responsibility Party	YYP	557	0.19%	0	557	0.19%	0
Matti Markkanen (Independent)		386	0.13%	0	386	0.13%	0
Ecological Party the Greens	EKO	278	0.09%	0	278	0.09%	0
Kari Järvinen (Independent)		108	0.04%	0	108	0.04%	0
Sakari Arvila (Independent)		40	0.01%	0	40	0.01%	0
Valid votes		293,343	100.00%	19	293,343	100.00%	19
Rejected votes		2,278	0.77%				
Total polled		295,621	67.17%				
Registered electors		440,094					

The following candidates were elected: Arja Alho (SDP), 5,733 votes; Eva Biaudet (SFP), 8,094 votes; Tuija Brax (Vihr), 9,091 votes; Klaus Bremer (SFP), 6,395 votes; Arto Bryggare (SDP), 6,196 votes; Tarja Halonen (SDP), 10,333 votes; Paula Kokkonen (Kok), 6,371 votes; Irina Krohn (Vihr), 5,006 votes; Paavo Lipponen (SDP), 13,085 votes; Outi Ojala (Vas), 6,145 votes; Reino Paasilinna (SDP), 9,535 votes; Risto E. J. Penttilä (Nour), 9,322 votes; Kirsi Piha (Kok), 12,532 votes; Anssi Rauramo (Kok), 4,842 votes; Pertti Salolainen (Kok), 16,002 votes; Esko Seppänen (Vas), 11,732 votes; Osmo Soininvaara (Vihr), 5,638 votes; Erkki Tuomioja (SDP), 6,980 votes; and Ben Zyskowicz (Kok), 11,882 votes.

===== 1991 =====
Results of the 1991 parliamentary election held on 17 March 1991:

Party		Party			Electoral Alliance		
Party		Votes	%	Seats	Votes	%	Seats
National Coalition Party	Kok	75,519	27.35%	6	75,519	27.35%	6
Social Democratic Party of Finland	SDP	57,843	20.95%	5	57,843	20.95%	5
Green League	Vihr	38,199	13.84%	3	38,199	13.84%	3
Swedish People's Party of Finland	SFP	28,559	10.34%	2	28,559	10.34%	2
Left Alliance	Vas	22,958	8.32%	2	22,958	8.32%	2
Centre Party	Kesk	16,620	6.02%	1	16,620	6.02%	1
Finnish Christian League	SKL	7,825	2.83%	1	13,348	4.83%	1
Constitutional Right Party	POP	5,523	2.00%	0	13,348	4.83%	1
Finnish Rural Party	SMP	4,964	1.80%	0	9,068	3.28%	0
Pensioners' Party	SEP	2,762	1.00%	0	9,068	3.28%	0
Liberal People's Party	LKP	1,001	0.36%	0	9,068	3.28%	0
The Greens	EKO	341	0.12%	0	9,068	3.28%	0
Non-Aligned of Helsinki		7,785	2.82%	0	7,785	2.82%	0
Women's Party	NAISL	3,090	1.12%	0	3,090	1.12%	0
Communist Workers' Party – For Peace and Socialism	KTP	830	0.30%	0	830	0.30%	0
Joint Responsibility Party	YYP	827	0.30%	0	827	0.30%	0
Independent Non-Aligned Pensioners	ELKA	689	0.25%	0	689	0.25%	0
Humanity Party		663	0.24%	0	663	0.24%	0
Elli Söderman (Independent)		102	0.04%	0	102	0.04%	0
Valid votes		276,100	100.00%	20	276,100	100.00%	20
Blank votes		3,786	1.33%				
Rejected Votess – Other		4,069	1.43%				
Total polled		283,955	64.45%				
Registered electors		440,605					

The following candidates were elected: Arja Alho (SDP), 8,434 votes; Pirjo-Riitta Antvuori (Kok), 4,788 votes; Eva Biaudet (SFP), 3,440 votes; Jörn Donner (SFP), 13,019 votes; Pekka Haavisto (Vihr), 5,424 votes; Tarja Halonen (SDP), 6,420 votes; Heidi Hautala (Vihr), 13,674 votes; Ulpu Iivari (SDP), 4,726 votes; Ritva Laurila (Kok), 8,793 votes; Paavo Lipponen (SDP), 4,344 votes; Hannele Luukkainen (Vihr), 3,116 votes; Eeva-Liisa Moilanen (SKL), 7,066 votes; Outi Ojala (Vas), 3,093 votes; Anssi Rauramo (Kok), 4,506 votes; Olli Rehn (Kesk), 4,400 votes; Pertti Salolainen (Kok), 18,515 votes; Esko Seppänen (Vas), 9,848 votes; Ilkka Suominen (Kok), 6,460 votes; Erkki Tuomioja (SDP), 9,728 votes; and Ben Zyskowicz (Kok), 9,435 votes.

==== 1980s ====
===== 1987 =====
Results of the 1987 parliamentary election held on 15 and 16 March 1987:

Party		Party			Electoral Alliance		
Party		Votes	%	Seats	Votes	%	Seats
National Coalition Party	Kok	91,258	31.00%	7	91,258	31.00%	7
Social Democratic Party of Finland	SDP	71,412	24.26%	6	71,412	24.26%	6
Swedish People's Party of Finland	SFP	29,132	9.90%	3	47,216	16.04%	4
Finnish Christian League	SKL	8,113	2.76%	1	47,216	16.04%	4
Centre Party	Kesk	6,177	2.10%	0	47,216	16.04%	4
Liberal People's Party	LKP	3,794	1.29%	0	47,216	16.04%	4
Green League	Vihr	26,440	8.98%	2	26,440	8.98%	2
Finnish People's Democratic League	SKDL	23,392	7.95%	1	23,392	7.95%	1
Democratic Alternative	DEVA	10,794	3.67%	0	10,794	3.67%	0
Finnish Rural Party	SMP	8,342	2.83%	0	8,342	2.83%	0
Joint List B		7,859	2.67%	0	7,859	2.67%	0
Pensioners' Party	SEP	4,692	1.59%	0	4,692	1.59%	0
Constitutional Right Party	POP	2,434	0.83%	0	2,434	0.83%	0
Johanna Kuusimäki (Independent)		236	0.08%	0	236	0.08%	0
Kari Kontio (Independent)		143	0.05%	0	143	0.05%	0
Joint List A		91	0.03%	0	91	0.03%	0
Joint List D		88	0.03%	0	88	0.03%	0
Jarmo Kalanti (Independent)		13	0.00%	0	13	0.00%	0
Valid votes		294,410	100.00%	20	294,410	100.00%	20
Rejected votes		1,337	0.45%				
Total polled		295,747	67.10%				
Registered electors		440,732					

The following candidates were elected: Arja Alho (SDP), 8,090 votes; Pirjo-Riitta Antvuori (Kok), 5,825 votes; Ilkka-Christian Björklund (SDP), 2,983 votes; Jörn Donner (SFP), 9,876 votes; Pekka Haavisto (Vihr), 7,891 votes; Tarja Halonen (SDP), 7,446 votes; Seija Karkinen (SDP), 3,584 votes; Ritva Laurila (Kok), 4,880 votes; Ingvar S. Melin (SFP), 7,638 votes; Eeva-Liisa Moilanen (SKL), 7,745 votes; Reino Paasilinna (SDP), 9,650 votes; Anssi Rauramo (Kok), 5,800 votes; Pertti Salolainen (Kok), 18,324 votes; Esko Seppänen (SKDL), 6,340 votes; Eva-Riitta Siitonen (Kok), 13,543 votes; Osmo Soininvaara (Vihr), 3,994 votes; Kalevi Sorsa (SDP), 17,585 votes; Ilkka Suominen (Kok), 10,819 votes; Ole Wasz-Höckert (SFP), 5,907 votes; and Ben Zyskowicz (Kok), 8,899 votes.

===== 1983 =====
Results of the 1983 parliamentary election held on 20 and 21 March 1983:

Party		Party			Electoral Alliance		
Party		Votes	%	Seats	Votes	%	Seats
National Coalition Party	Kok	91,919	29.83%	6	91,919	29.83%	6
Social Democratic Party of Finland	SDP	83,406	27.06%	6	83,406	27.06%	6
Finnish People's Democratic League	SKDL	40,218	13.05%	2	40,218	13.05%	2
Swedish People's Party of Finland	SFP	24,750	8.03%	2	32,234	10.46%	2
Finnish Christian League	SKL	7,484	2.43%	0	32,234	10.46%	2
Finnish Rural Party	SMP	21,381	6.94%	1	29,217	9.48%	2
Constitutional Right Party	POP	7,836	2.54%	1	29,217	9.48%	2
Centre Party and Liberal People's Party	Kesk-LKP	15,660	5.08%	1	15,660	5.08%	1
Joint List C (Green League)		14,138	4.59%	1	14,138	4.59%	1
Union for Democracy	KVL	573	0.19%	0	573	0.19%	0
Joint List B		341	0.11%	0	341	0.11%	0
Tiina Pikkarainen (Independent)		340	0.11%	0	340	0.11%	0
Joint List A		124	0.04%	0	124	0.04%	0
Valid votes		308,170	100.00%	20	308,170	100.00%	20
Rejected votes		1,285	0.42%				
Total polled		309,455	70.08%				
Registered electors		441,580					

The following candidates were elected: Arja Alho (SDP), 7,065 votes; Georg C. Ehrnrooth (POP), 7,115 votes; Reijo Enävaara (SMP), 14,514 votes; Tarja Halonen (SDP), 6,317 votes; Tuure Junnila (Kok), 5,769 votes; Kalevi Kivistö (SKDL), 16,755 votes; Kalle Könkkölä (List C), 2,603 votes; Liisa Kulhia (Kesk-LKP), 4,093 votes; Ritva Laurila (Kok), 5,367 votes; Paavo Lipponen (SDP), 5,421 votes; Reino Paasilinna (SDP), 12,728 votes; Pertti Salolainen (Kok), 20,202 votes; Eva-Riitta Siitonen (Kok), 11,385 votes; Kalevi Sorsa (SDP), 11,338 votes; Ilkka Suominen (Kok), 9,605 votes; Kaarina Suonio (SDP), 13,901 votes; Seppo Toiviainen (SKDL), 5,725 votes; Ole Wasz-Höckert (SFP), 8,013 votes; Jutta Zilliacus (SFP), 9,995 votes; and Ben Zyskowicz (Kok), 5,791 votes.

==== 1970s ====
===== 1979 =====
Results of the 1979 parliamentary election held on 18 and 19 March 1979:

Party		Party			Electoral Alliance		
Party		Votes	%	Seats	Votes	%	Seats
National Coalition Party	Kok	90,973	29.64%	7	90,973	29.64%	7
Social Democratic Party of Finland	SDP	78,973	25.73%	6	78,973	25.73%	6
Finnish People's Democratic League	SKDL	51,164	16.67%	3	51,164	16.67%	3
Swedish People's Party of Finland	SFP	22,309	7.27%	2	50,043	16.31%	3
Liberal People's Party	LKP	16,762	5.46%	1	50,043	16.31%	3
Centre Party	Kesk	10,972	3.57%	0	50,043	16.31%	3
Finnish Christian League	SKL	14,853	4.84%	1	21,479	7.00%	1
Finnish Rural Party	SMP	6,626	2.16%	0	21,479	7.00%	1
Constitutional People's Party	PKP	12,579	4.10%	0	12,579	4.10%	0
Finnish People's Unity Party	SKYP	954	0.31%	0	954	0.31%	0
Party of Finnish Entrepreneurs	SYP	528	0.17%	0	528	0.17%	0
Taisto Vaetoja (Åland Coalition)		220	0.07%	0	220	0.07%	0
Valid votes		306,913	100.00%	20	306,913	100.00%	20
Rejected votes		1,492	0.48%				
Total polled		308,405	69.36%				
Registered electors		444,652					

The following candidates were elected: Tarja Halonen (SDP), 5,360 votes; Niilo Hämäläinen (SDP), 7,964 votes; Anna-Liisa Hyvönen (SKDL), 9,377 votes; Jaakko Itälä (LKP), 7,230 votes; Sinikka Karhuvaara (Kok), 7,597 votes; Seija Karkinen (SDP), 7,475 votes; Ritva Laurila (Kok), 6,590 votes; Ingvar S. Melin (SFP), 8,007 votes; Eva Pukkio (Kok), 4,513 votes; Aarne Saarinen (SKDL), 9,112 votes; Arvo Salo (SDP), 7,422 votes; Pertti Salolainen (Kok), 26,562 votes; Pentti Sillantaus (Kok), 6,503 votes; Kalevi Sorsa (SDP), 18,336 votes; Asser Stenbäck (SKL), 5,249 votes; Kaarina Suonio (SDP), 12,488 votes; Seppo Toiviainen (SKDL), 8,915 votes; Jalmari Torikka (Kok), 4,072 votes; Jutta Zilliacus (SFP), 7,058 votes; and Ben Zyskowicz (Kok), 7,604 votes.

===== 1975 =====
Results of the 1975 parliamentary election held on 21 and 22 September 1975:

Party		Party			Electoral Alliance		
Party		Votes	%	Seats	Votes	%	Seats
National Coalition Party	Kok	75,254	24.12%	4	110,721	35.48%	8
Swedish People's Party of Finland	SFP	26,498	8.49%	3	110,721	35.48%	8
Finnish Christian League	SKL	8,969	2.87%	1	110,721	35.48%	8
Social Democratic Party of Finland	SDP	85,529	27.41%	6	85,529	27.41%	6
Finnish People's Democratic League	SKDL	56,641	18.15%	4	57,360	18.38%	4
Socialist Workers Party	STP	719	0.23%	0	57,360	18.38%	4
Liberal People's Party	LKP	24,049	7.71%	2	31,708	10.16%	2
Centre Party	Kesk	7,659	2.45%	0	31,708	10.16%	2
Finnish Constitutional People's Party	SPK	19,201	6.15%	1	19,201	6.15%	1
Finnish Rural Party	SMP	4,269	1.37%	0	5,552	1.78%	0
Party of Finnish Entrepreneurs	SYP	1,283	0.41%	0	5,552	1.78%	0
Finnish People's Unity Party	SKYP	1,464	0.47%	0	1,464	0.47%	0
Lauri Lehto (Independent)		509	0.16%	0	509	0.16%	0
Valid votes		312,044	100.00%	21	312,044	100.00%	21
Rejected votes		919	0.29%				
Total polled		312,963	68.60%				
Registered electors		456,204					

The following candidates were elected: Ele Alenius (SKDL), 10,825 votes; Pirkko Aro (SDP), 7,221 votes; Georg C. Ehrnrooth (SPK), 13,175 votes; Ralf Friberg (SDP), 4,152 votes; Kristian Gestrin (SFP), 9,405 votes; Harri Holkeri (Kok), 17,640 votes; Anna-Liisa Hyvönen (SKDL), 11,897 votes; Sinikka Karhuvaara (Kok), 8,251 votes; Seija Karkinen (SDP), 9,422 votes; Olavi Majlander (SKL), 7,747 votes; Ingvar S. Melin (SFP), 7,662 votes; Kullervo Rainio (Kok), 11,461 votes; Aarne Saarinen (SKDL), 9,764 votes; Pertti Salolainen (Kok), 17,977 votes; Kalevi Sorsa (SDP), 21,948 votes; Kaarina Suonio (SDP), 10,149 votes; Pekka Tarjanne (LKP), 6,705 votes; Mirjam Tuominen (SKDL), 12,589 votes; Erkki Tuomioja (SDP), 8,573 votes; Osmo Antero Wiio (LKP), 3,846 votes; and Jutta Zilliacus (SFP), 7,719 votes.

===== 1972 =====
Results of the 1972 parliamentary election held on 2 and 3 January 1972:

Party		Votes	%	Seats
Social Democratic Party of Finland	SDP	90,178	29.34%	7
National Coalition Party	Kok	79,772	25.96%	6
Finnish People's Democratic League	SKDL	48,883	15.91%	4
Swedish People's Party of Finland	SFP	34,147	11.11%	2
Liberal People's Party	LKP	26,353	8.58%	2
Finnish Rural Party	SMP	10,373	3.38%	1
Finnish Christian League	SKL	9,406	3.06%	0
Centre Party	Kesk	5,314	1.73%	0
Social Democratic Union of Workers and Smallholders	TPSL	2,888	0.94%	0
Valid votes		307,314	100.00%	22
Rejected votes		681	0.22%	
Total polled		307,995	79.41%	
Registered electors		387,865		

The following candidates were elected: Ele Alenius (SKDL), 8,377 votes; Pirkko Aro (LKP), 7,221 votes; Georg C. Ehrnrooth (SFP), 10,998 votes; Ralf Friberg (SDP), 6,262 votes; Kristian Gestrin (SFP), 10,304 votes; Harri Holkeri (Kok), 12,117 votes; Anna-Liisa Hyvönen (SKDL), 8,079 votes; Raimo Ilaskivi (Kok), 23,565 votes; Sinikka Karhuvaara (Kok), 5,038 votes; Seija Karkinen (SDP), 5,780 votes; Salme Katajavuori (KoK), 3,500 votes; Tellervo Koivisto (SDP), 15,479 votes; Tyyne Paasivuori (SDP), 4,686 votes; Kullervo Rainio (Kok), 5,395 votes; Aarne Saarinen (SKDL), 8,777 votes; Pertti Salolainen (Kok), 12,402 votes; Kalevi Sorsa (SDP), 22,360 votes; Ilkka Taipale (SDP), 4,581 votes; Pekka Tarjanne (LKP), 5,502 votes; Mirjam Tuominen (SKDL), 7,925 votes; Erkki Tuomioja (SDP), 9,715 votes; and Pekka Vennamo (SMP), 7,894 votes.

===== 1970 =====
Results of the 1970 parliamentary election held on 15 and 16 March 1970:

Party		Party			Electoral Alliance		
Party		Votes	%	Seats	Votes	%	Seats
National Coalition Party	Kok	85,762	27.76%	7	85,762	27.76%	7
Social Democratic Party of Finland	SDP	84,301	27.29%	6	84,301	27.29%	6
Finnish People's Democratic League	SKDL	46,483	15.05%	4	46,483	15.05%	4
Swedish People's Party of Finland	SFP	36,539	11.83%	3	40,962	13.26%	3
Finnish Christian League	SKL	4,423	1.43%	0	40,962	13.26%	3
Liberal People's Party	LKP	29,661	9.60%	2	29,661	9.60%	2
Finnish Rural Party	SMP	11,738	3.80%	0	11,738	3.80%	0
Centre Party	Kesk	5,619	1.82%	0	5,619	1.82%	0
Social Democratic Union of Workers and Smallholders	TPSL	3,858	1.25%	0	3,858	1.25%	0
Kauko Kare (Independent)		267	0.09%	0	267	0.09%	0
Veikko Vuorela (Independent)		126	0.04%	0	126	0.04%	0
Markus Raikamo (Independent)		67	0.02%	0	67	0.02%	0
Matti Mannerkorpi (Independent)		57	0.02%	0	57	0.02%	0
Väinö Rokkanen (Independent)		19	0.01%	0	19	0.01%	0
Valid votes		308,920	100.00%	22	308,920	100.00%	22
Rejected votes		668	0.22%				
Total polled		309,588	80.84%				
Registered electors		382,952					

The following candidates were elected: Ele Alenius (SKDL), 5,999 votes; Pirkko Aro (LKP), 10,061 votes; Georg C. Ehrnrooth (SFP), 13,715 votes; Ralf Friberg (SDP), 6,068 votes; Kristian Gestrin (SFP), 8,823 votes; Erkki Hara (Kok), 3,474 votes; Harri Holkeri (Kok), 12,524 votes; Raimo Ilaskivi (Kok), 20,855 votes; Sinikka Karhuvaara (Kok), 3,750 votes; Seija Karkinen (SDP), 9,013 votes; Salme Katajavuori (KoK), 3,451 votes; Hertta Kuusinen (SKDL), 4,719 votes; Mikko Laaksonen (SDP), 4,194 votes; Ingvar S. Melin (SFP), 6,841 votes; Tyyne Paasivuori (SDP), 7,791 votes; Terho Pursiainen (SKDL), 6,128 votes; Pertti Salolainen (Kok), 19,641 votes; Kalevi Sorsa (SDP), 27,312 votes; Pekka Tarjanne (LKP), 7,787 votes; Niilo Tarvajärvi (Kok), 2,676 votes; Mirjam Tuominen (SKDL), 5,509 votes; and Erkki Tuomioja (SDP), 9,100 votes.

==== 1960s ====
===== 1966 =====
Results of the 1966 parliamentary election held on 20 and 21 March 1966:

Party		Party			Electoral Alliance		
Party		Votes	%	Seats	Votes	%	Seats
Social Democratic Party of Finland	SDP	92,807	32.46%	7	92,807	32.46%	7
Finnish People's Democratic League	SKDL	51,975	18.18%	4	59,265	20.73%	5
Social Democratic Union of Workers and Smallholders	TPSL	7,290	2.55%	1	59,265	20.73%	5
National Coalition Party	Kok	52,201	18.26%	4	54,483	19.05%	4
Finnish Christian League	SKL	1,874	0.66%	0	54,483	19.05%	4
Independence Party		408	0.14%	0	54,483	19.05%	4
Swedish People's Party of Finland	SFP	36,953	12.92%	3	36,953	12.92%	3
Liberal People's Party	LKP	34,453	12.05%	2	34,453	12.05%	2
Centre Party	Kesk	7,945	2.78%	0	7,945	2.78%	0
Write-in lists		32	0.01%	0	32	0.01%	0
Valid votes		285,938	100.00%	21	285,938	100.00%	21
Blank votes		22	0.01%				
Rejected Votess – Other		583	0.20%				
Total polled		286,543	84.01%				
Registered electors		341,086					

The following candidates were elected: Ele Alenius (SKDL), 4,922 votes; Jouni Apajalahti (Kok), 4,242 votes; Pirkko Aro (LKP), 5,841 votes; Margit Borg-Sundman (Kok), 5,728 votes; Pauli Burman (SDP), 6,765 votes; Georg C. Ehrnrooth (SFP), 15,316 votes; Kristian Gestrin (SFP), 7,252 votes; Erkki Hara (Kok), 4,476 votes; Raimo Ilaskivi (Kok), 16,817 votes; Hertta Kuusinen (SKDL), 11,155 votes; Mikko Laaksonen (SDP), 5,130 votes; Olavi Laine (SKDL), 3,570 votes; Tyyne Leivo-Larsson (TPSL), 4,568 votes; Väinö Leskinen (SDP), 7,164 votes; Ingvar S. Melin (SFP), 4,941 votes; Tyyne Paasivuori (SDP), 12,754 votes; E. J. Paavola (LKP), 8,146 votes; Kaarlo Pitsinki (SDP), 16,703 votes; L. A. Puntila (SDP), 7,325 votes; Aarne Saarinen (SKDL), 6,948 votes; and Arvo Salo (SDP), 5,100 votes.

===== 1962 =====
Results of the 1962 parliamentary election held on 4 and 5 February 1962:

Party		Party			Electoral Alliance		
Party		Votes	%	Seats	Votes	%	Seats
National Coalition Party	Kok	58,883	22.20%	4	64,671	24.38%	5
Liberal League	VL	5,788	2.18%	1	64,671	24.38%	5
Social Democratic Party of Finland	SDP	55,508	20.93%	4	55,508	20.93%	4
Finnish People's Democratic League	SKDL	51,087	19.26%	4	51,087	19.26%	4
Swedish People's Party of Finland	SFP	38,052	14.35%	3	38,052	14.35%	3
People's Party of Finland	SK	36,919	13.92%	3	36,919	13.92%	3
Social Democratic Union of Workers and Smallholders	TPSL	12,844	4.84%	1	12,844	4.84%	1
Centre Party		4,612	1.74%	0	5,523	2.08%	0
Agrarian Party	ML	911	0.34%	0	5,523	2.08%	0
Smallholders' Party of Finland	SPP	600	0.23%	0	600	0.23%	0
Write-in lists		6	0.00%	0	6	0.00%	0
Valid votes		265,210	100.00%	20	265,210	100.00%	20
Rejected votes		683	0.26%				
Total polled		265,893	84.27%				
Registered electors		315,539					

The following candidates were elected: Margit Borg-Sundman (Kok), 5,593 votes; Georg C. Ehrnrooth (SFP), 12,525 votes; Karl-August Fagerholm (SDP), 10,524 votes; Kristian Gestrin (SFP), 5,031 votes; Erkki Hara (Kok), 8,407 votes; Armi Hosia (SK), 5,419 votes; Raimo Ilaskivi (Kok), 9,469 votes; Esa Kaitila (SK), 14,163 votes; Kalevi Kilpi (SKDL), 5,446 votes; Hertta Kuusinen (SKDL), 16,000 votes; Väinö Leskinen (SDP), 5,799 votes; Leo Mattila (SK), 3,384 votes; Tyyne Paasivuori (SDP), 8,836 votes; E. J. Paavola (VL), 5,080 votes; Ville Pessi (SKDL), 2,941 votes; Kaarlo Pitsinki (SDP), 9,206 votes; Aarne Saarinen (SKDL), 3,905 votes; Martta Salmela-Järvinen (TPSL), 5,853 votes; Jussi Saukkonen (Kok), 8,003 votes; and J. O. Söderhjelm (SFP), 5,035 votes.

==== 1950s ====
===== 1958 =====
Results of the 1958 parliamentary election held on 6 and 7 July 1958:

Party		Party			Electoral Alliance		
Party		Votes	%	Seats	Votes	%	Seats
National Coalition Party	Kok	48,916	23.17%	5	50,458	23.90%	5
Liberal League	VL	1,542	0.73%	0	50,458	23.90%	5
Social Democratic Party of Finland	SDP	48,345	22.90%	4	48,345	22.90%	4
Finnish People's Democratic League	SKDL	40,983	19.41%	4	40,983	19.41%	4
Swedish People's Party of Finland	SFP	33,476	15.86%	3	33,476	15.86%	3
People's Party of Finland	SK	24,801	11.75%	2	24,801	11.75%	2
Social Democratic Opposition	SDO	9,671	4.58%	1	9,671	4.58%	1
Finnish Christian League	SKL	2,093	0.99%	0	2,093	0.99%	0
Agrarian Party	ML	919	0.44%	0	919	0.44%	0
Free Citizens and Centre List		270	0.13%	0	270	0.13%	0
Write-in lists		112	0.05%	0	112	0.05%	0
Valid votes		211,128	100.00%	19	211,128	100.00%	19
Rejected votes		576	0.27%				
Total polled		211,704	73.50%				
Registered electors		288,047					

The following candidates were elected: Margit Borg-Sundman (Kok), 4,312 votes; Georg C. Ehrnrooth (SFP), 9,415 votes; Yrjö Enne (SKDL), 7,841 votes; Karl-August Fagerholm (SDP), 5,530 votes; Erkki Hara (Kok), 4,364 votes; Armi Hosia (SK), 3,103 votes; Aune Innala (Kok), 5,729 votes; Esa Kaitila (SK), 7,810 votes; Hertta Kuusinen (SKDL), 12,176 votes; Lempi Lehto (SDP), 3,896 votes; Erkki Leikola (Kok), 6,368 votes; Väinö Leskinen (SDP), 6,527 votes; Valdemar Liljeström (SDO), 2,054 votes; Nils Meinander (SFP), 4,854 votes; John Österholm (SFP), 6,139 votes; Ville Pessi (SKDL), 2,279 votes; Jussi Saukkonen (Kok), 4,380 votes; Väinö Tanner (SDP), 11,585 votes; and Tyyne Tuominen (SKDL), 2,356 votes.

===== 1954 =====
Results of the 1954 parliamentary election held on 7 and 8 March 1954:

Party		Party			Electoral Alliance		
Party		Votes	%	Seats	Votes	%	Seats
Social Democratic Party of Finland	SDP	64,499	29.08%	6	64,499	29.08%	6
Finnish People's Democratic League	SKDL	42,823	19.31%	4	42,823	19.31%	4
National Coalition Party	Kok	38,552	17.38%	3	41,574	18.75%	3
Liberal League	VL	2,319	1.05%	0	41,574	18.75%	3
Agrarian Party	ML	703	0.32%	0	41,574	18.75%	3
People's Party of Finland	SK	37,147	16.75%	3	37,147	16.75%	3
Swedish People's Party of Finland	SFP	35,722	16.11%	3	35,722	16.11%	3
Write-in lists		10	0.00%	0	10	0.00%	0
Valid votes		221,775	100.00%	19	221,775	100.00%	19
Rejected votes		569	0.26%				
Total polled		222,344	80.81%				
Registered electors		275,156					

The following candidates were elected: Yrjö Enne (SKDL); Karl-August Fagerholm (SDP); Armi Hosia (SK); Aune Innala (Kok); Esa Kaitila (SK); Yrjö Kilpeläinen (SDP); Sylvi-Kyllikki Kilpi (SKDL); Lempi Lehto (SDP); Erkki Leikola (Kok); Tyyne Leivo-Larsson (SDP); Väinö Leskinen (SDP); Leo Mattila (SK); Nils Meinander (SFP); Unto Miettinen (SKDL); Arne Öhman (SFP); John Österholm (SFP); Tyyne Paasivuori (SDP); Ville Pessi (SKDL); and Arvo Salminen (Kok).
