= Heinäluoma =

Heinäluoma is a Finnish surname. Notable people with the surname include:

- Eero Heinäluoma (born 1955), Finnish politician
- Eveliina Heinäluoma (born 1988), Finnish politician
