= Honkasalo =

Honkasalo is a Finnish surname, most prevalent in Southwest Finland. Notable people with the surname include:

- Pirjo Honkasalo (born 1947), Finnish film director
- Veronika Honkasalo (born 1975), Finnish politician

== See also ==
- 1699 Honkasalo, a main-belt asteroid
