= Arja Alho =

Finnish politician (born 1954)

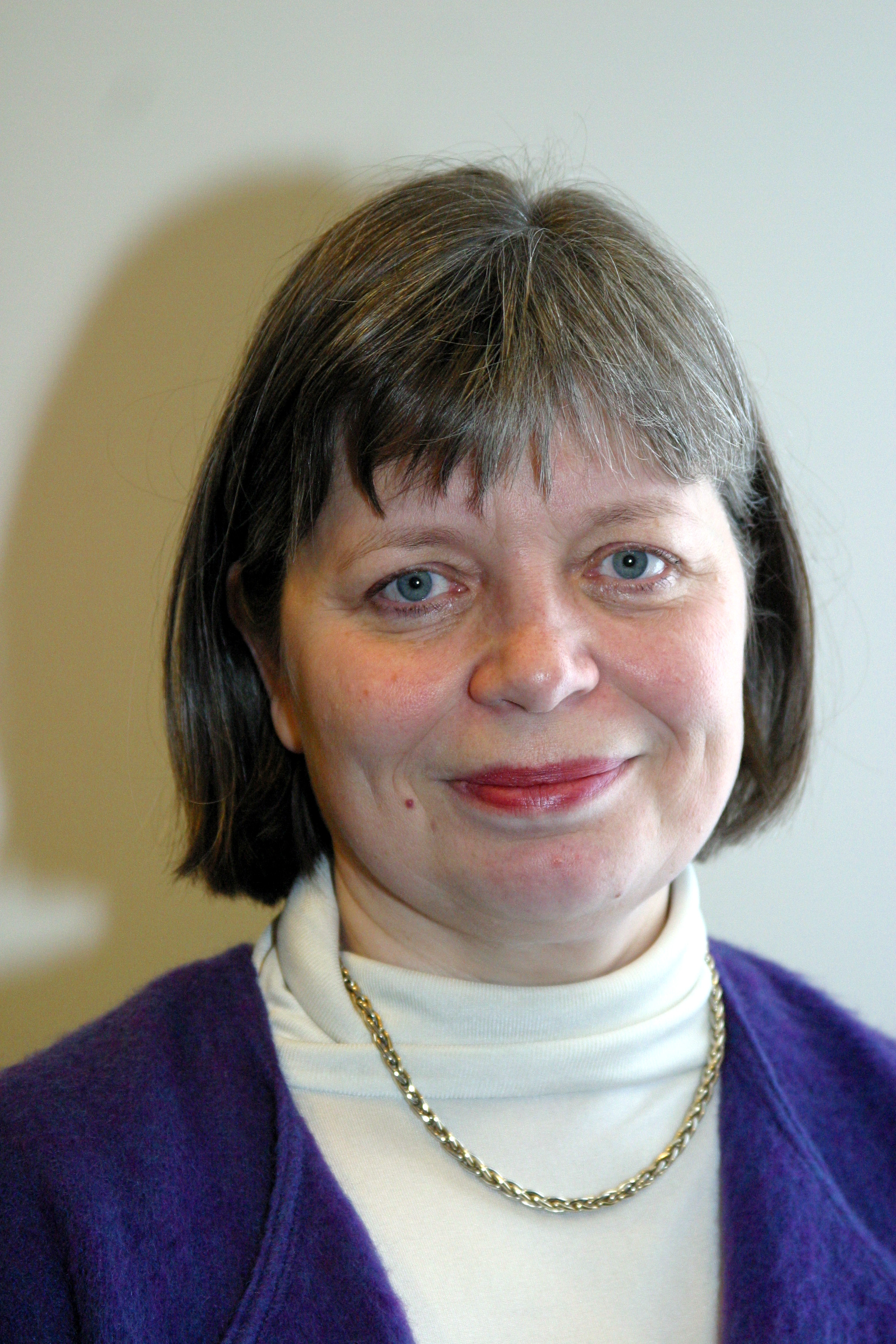
Arja Alho

Arja Inkeri Alho (born 21 March 1954) is a Finnish politician.

== Early life ==
Alho was born on 21 March 1954 in Hartola, Finland. Her parents are Aarre Kaj-Erik Alho and Annikki Alho (née Iso-Somppi). She was raised Lutheran and attended nursing school in Lahti, qualifying in 1997, although she later received a masters in social science in 1989 and a PhD in political science in 2004 from the University of Helsinki. Alho married the journalist Petteri Väänänen although the couple divorced in 2005.

== Political career ==
She was member of the Parliament of Finland from 1983 to 1999 and again from 2003 to 2007, representing the constituency of Helsinki until 1999 and then the constituency of Uusimaa since 2003. She also served as the Deputy Minister of Finance of Finland under Prime Minister Paavo Lipponen from 1995 to 1997. She resigned the government in October 1997 when it was revealed that she had agreed to reduce the compensation that Ulf Sundqvist had been sentenced to pay.

Alho is member of the Social Democratic Party. She was member of the city council of Helsinki from 1980 to 1999. Since 2009, she has been editor-in-chief of Ydin magazine.
