= Ralf Friberg =

Finnish journalist and politician (1936–2026)

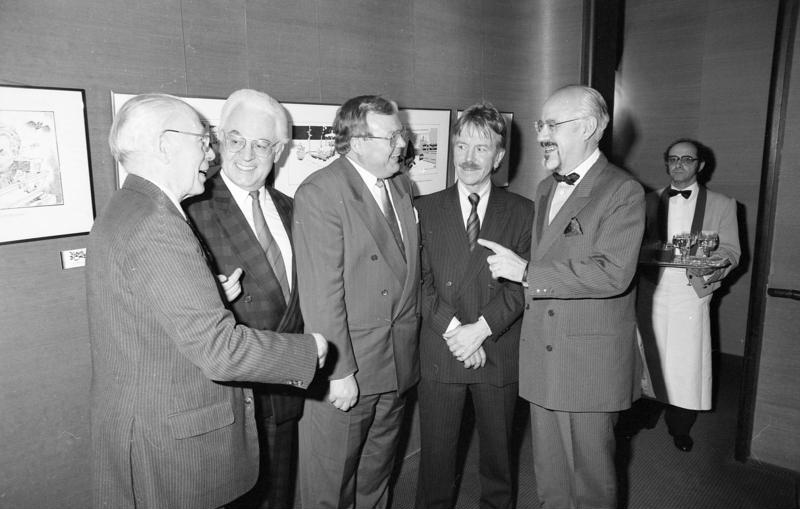
Friberg (third from left) in Bonn in 1990

Ralf Hjalmar Mikael Friberg (17 April 1936 – 13 March 2026) was a Finnish journalist, diplomat and politician who served as a Social Democratic MP.

== Life and career ==
Friberg was born in Helsinki on 17 April 1936. He belonged to the Swedish-speaking population of Finland. His parents were sergeant major Rudolf Mikael Friberg and librarian Astrid Ingeborg Tuominen. Friberg graduated in 1955 and completed a bachelor's degree at the University of Helsinki in 1964. Friberg was a journalist at Västra Nyland, Östra Nyland and Vasabladet newspapers in the late 1950s. At Östra Nyland, he was the youngest editor of a Finnish newspaper ever.

He served as the Parliamentary and Labor Market Officer of Hufvudstadsbladet in 1959–1963, as Secretary of the Ministry of Foreign Affairs in the Newspaper Office 1963–1965 and as Head of the Broadcasting Company in 1965–1970. In the 1970s, he was a lecturer at the Swedish Social and Communal College from 1972 to 1979 and Secretary General of the Ministry of Defense from 1979 to 1980.

In the 1980s, Friberg served as the Information Officer of the Nordic Council of Ministers in Oslo, 1980–1982, as the Press Council at the Finnish Embassy in Stockholm, 1982–1984, and as the Negotiating Officer and Head of Department for the Press and Culture Department of the Ministry for Foreign Affairs from 1988 to 1992. He also served as editor-in-chief in Iltalehti newspaper from 1984 to 1987 and in the Finnish Business Report newspaper from 1987 to 1988. In the 1990s, Friberg served as Finland's ambassador in Athens from 1992 to 1995 and in Copenhagen from 1995 to 2001.

Friberg was a member of Parliament from 1970 to 1979 from the constituency of the City of Helsinki. He was elected in the presidential election in 1968 and 1978 and member of the Helsinki City Council in 1965 and the Swedish Assembly of Finland from 1964 to 1975. Friberg was involved in the Parliamentary Defense Committee in 1971 and 1975 and in the Planning Commission for Defense Information (1972–1979).

Friberg was married since 1956 to Senny Britt-Marie Liewendahl. They have two children, son and daughter. He died in Tammisaari on 13 March 2026, at the age of 89.
