= Elisa Gebhard =

Finnish politician (born 1993)

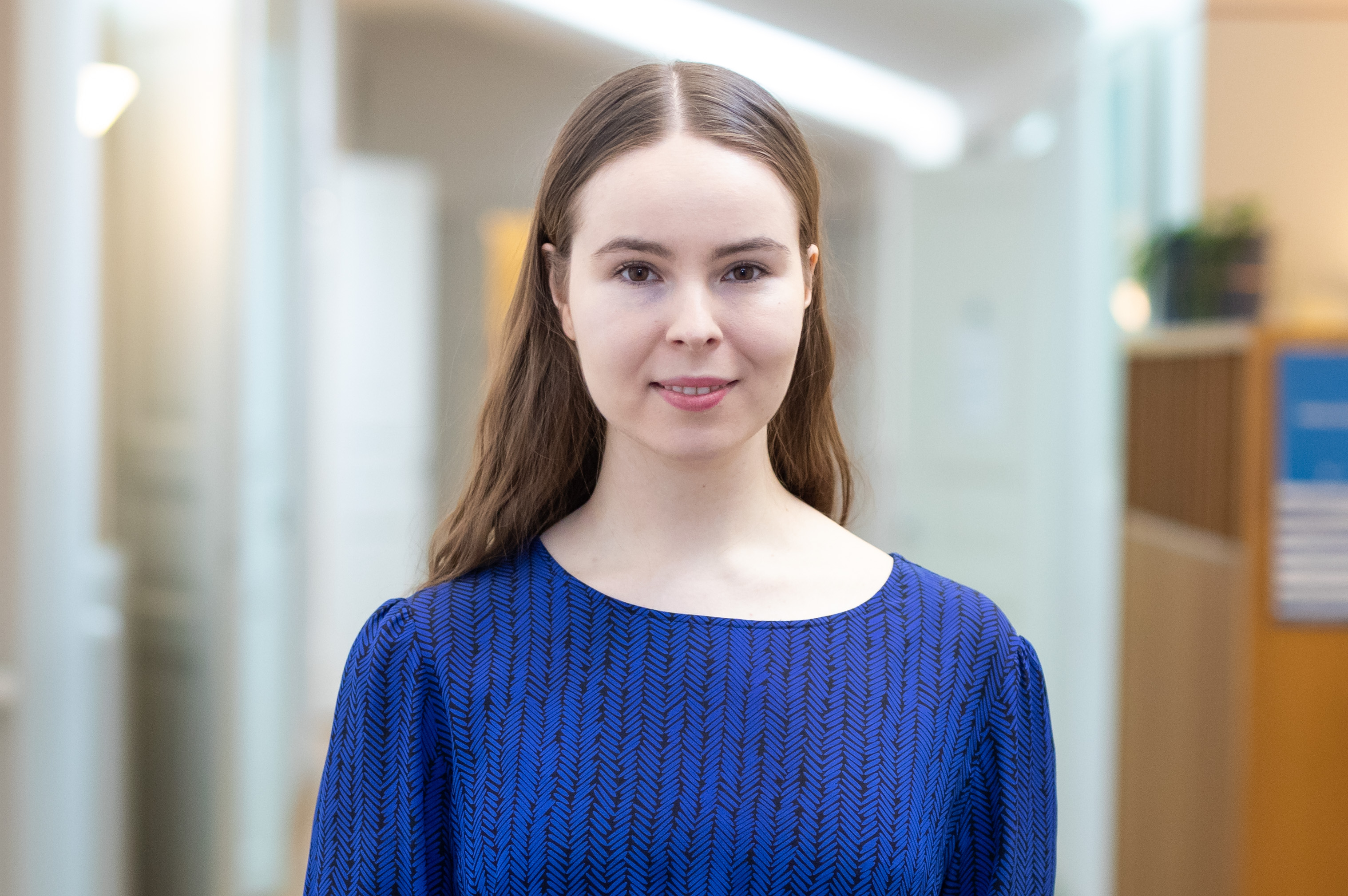

Member of the Parliament of Finland
- Incumbent
- Assumed office 2023
- Constituency: Helsinki constituency

Personal details
- Born: June 1993 (age 33) Helsinki, Finland
- Party: Social Democratic Party of Finland
- Occupation: Politician

Elisa Sisko Gabriela Gebhard (born June 1993) is a member of the Helsinki City Council and City Council and a Member of Parliament.

== Biography ==
Gebhard was born in Helsinki. She has served as Chairwoman of the Helsinki Culture and Library Chamber. Gebhard is a social democrat and has also previously served as Chairwoman of the Finnish youth umbrella organisation Allianssi ry and as Chairwoman of the Social Democratic Students SONK. In the 2023 Parliamentary elections Gebhard was elected to the Parliament from the Helsinki constituency with 5,872 votes.

Gebhard works as a legal policy lawyer for the Finnish Bar Association. In the past, she has worked as an assistant to Jutta Urpilainen, Member of Parliament and Special Advisor to Prime Minister Sanna Marin, as well as an expert on public relations in the financial sector. She holds a master's degree in law from the University of Helsinki.

Gebhard's family has roots from Germany, and her father Hannu Gebhard was a painter. Elisa Gebhard is also a painter and has attended the Kallio School of Fine Arts. She is a vegetarian and lives in Kruununhaka, Helsinki.
