= Mari Holopainen =

Finnish politician

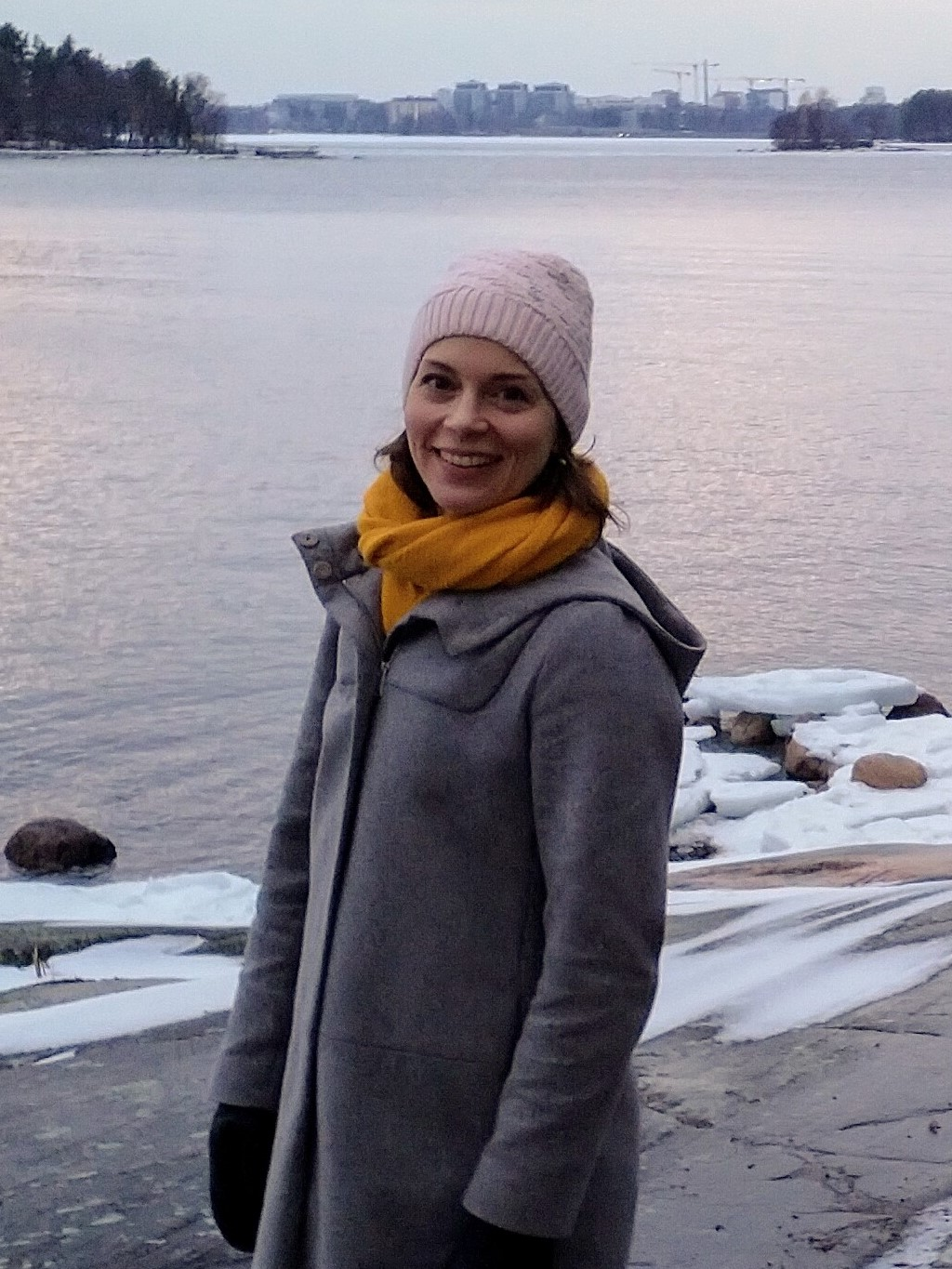
- Holopainen in 2019

Member of the Finnish Parliament for Helsinki

Personal details
- Born: 31 January 1981 (age 45) Espoo, Uusimaa, Finland
- Party: Green League

Mari Holopainen (born 31 January 1981) is a Finnish politician in the Parliament of Finland for the Green League at the Helsinki constituency.
