= Georg C. Ehrnrooth =

Finnish politician and lawyer (1926–2010)

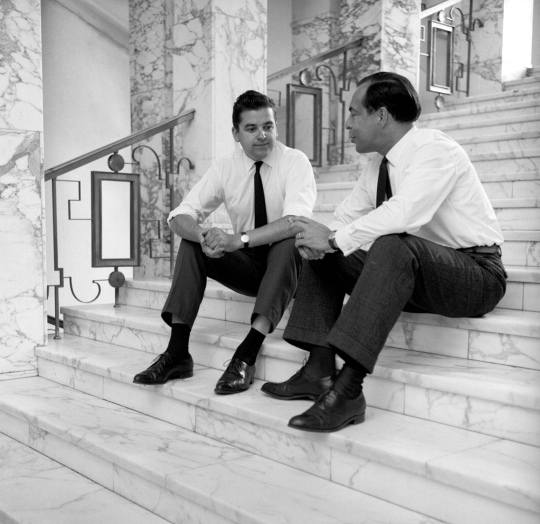
Georg C. Ehrnrooth (left) and jurist Kai Korte, 1963

Georg Carl Casimir Ehrnrooth (27 July 1926 – 17 October 2010) was a Finland-Swedish politician and lawyer. He was a member of the Parliament for Helsinki from 1958 to 1979 and again from 1983 to 1987. He initially represented the Swedish People's Party of Finland but in 1973 he left the party and formed a new political party called the Constitutional People's Party, later known as the Constitutional Right Party. He served as its leader from 1974 to 1992.

== Life and career ==
Ehrnrooth was born in Lahti. His parents were Deputy Judge Carl Johan Casimir Ehrnrooth and Aina Hélène Louise Mannerheim. He belonged to the Ehrnrooth's noble family and was descended from his mother's side of the Mannerheim family; his maternal gradfather was Count Carl Erik Johan Mannerheim. Georg's father served on the management bodies of several companies, including as chairman of the board of Kymi Oy and paternal grandfather was vuorineuvos. Marshal C. G. E. Mannerheim was the godfather of Ehrnrooth and the uncle of his mother.

Ehrnrooth studied law at the University of Helsinki, graduating as Licentiate of Laws in 1954. He was given the title of varatuomari in 1952. In the 1950s Ehrnrooth worked as an assistant at two law firms, as a notary and as a law teacher before being elected to the Parliament of Finland.

Ehrnrooth was a right-wing and anti-communist politician and critical of President Urho Kekkonen who had friendly relations to the Soviet Union. Ehrnrooth had been upset by Kekkonen's support for the war-responsibility trials in the late 1940s. He left the Swedish People's Party soon after the party had voted for a bill that prolonged Kekkonen's presidential term by four years without an election. His new Constitutional Right Party did not gain much support, winning only one seat in the 1975 and 1983 parliamentary elections and no seats at all in 1979, 1987 and 1991 elections. Ehrnrooth returned to Swedish People's Party in the 1990s.

In addition to his parliamentary career, Ehrnrooth was a member of the City Council of Helsinki from 1957 to 1996. In 1969 he introduced a bill against the planned Helsinki Metro. His bill was defeated and he later admitted having been wrong about the metro. In the city council, he frequently defended elderly care.

Ehrnrooth was pro-American and voiced support for the Iraq War in 2003.

Ehrnrooth married Mary Ester Elisabeth Beckman in 1957.
