= Tom Packalén =

Finnish politician

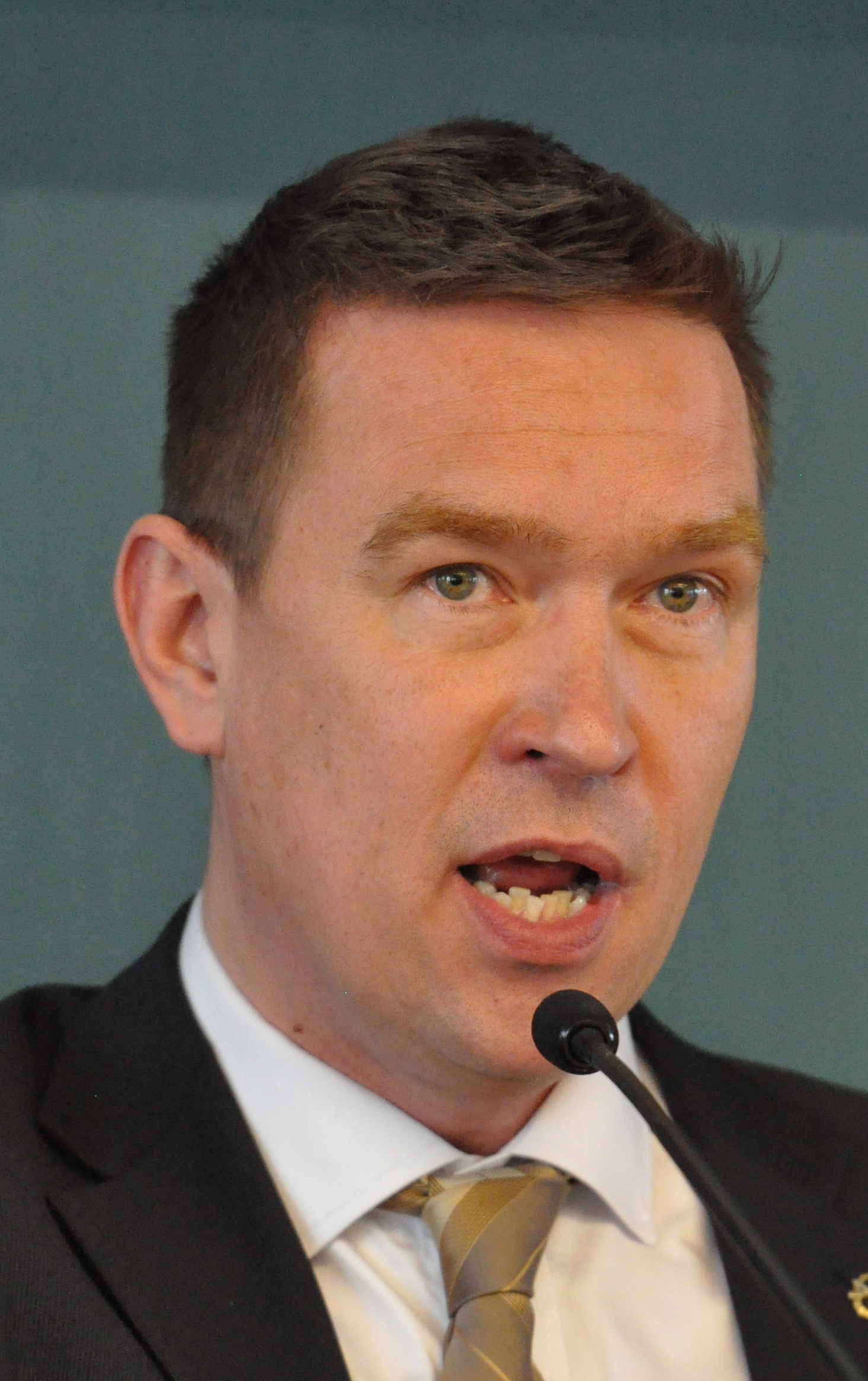
- Tom Packalén in April 2015

Former member of the Finnish Parliament for Helsinki
- In office 20 April 2011 – 4 April 2023

Personal details
- Born: 5 October 1969 (age 56) Helsinki, Uusimaa, Finland
- Party: The Finns Party
- Website: http://www.tompackalen.fi

Tom Erik Packalén (born 5 October 1969) is a Finnish politician, police inspector and former member of the Finnish Parliament representing the Finns Party.

Packalén was born in Helsinki, and was first elected to the parliament in 2011. He was re-elected in 2015 with 5,089 personal votes and in 2019 with 2,028 votes. Packalén has also been a member of the City Council of Helsinki since 2012.
