= Fatim Diarra =

Finnish politician (born 1986)

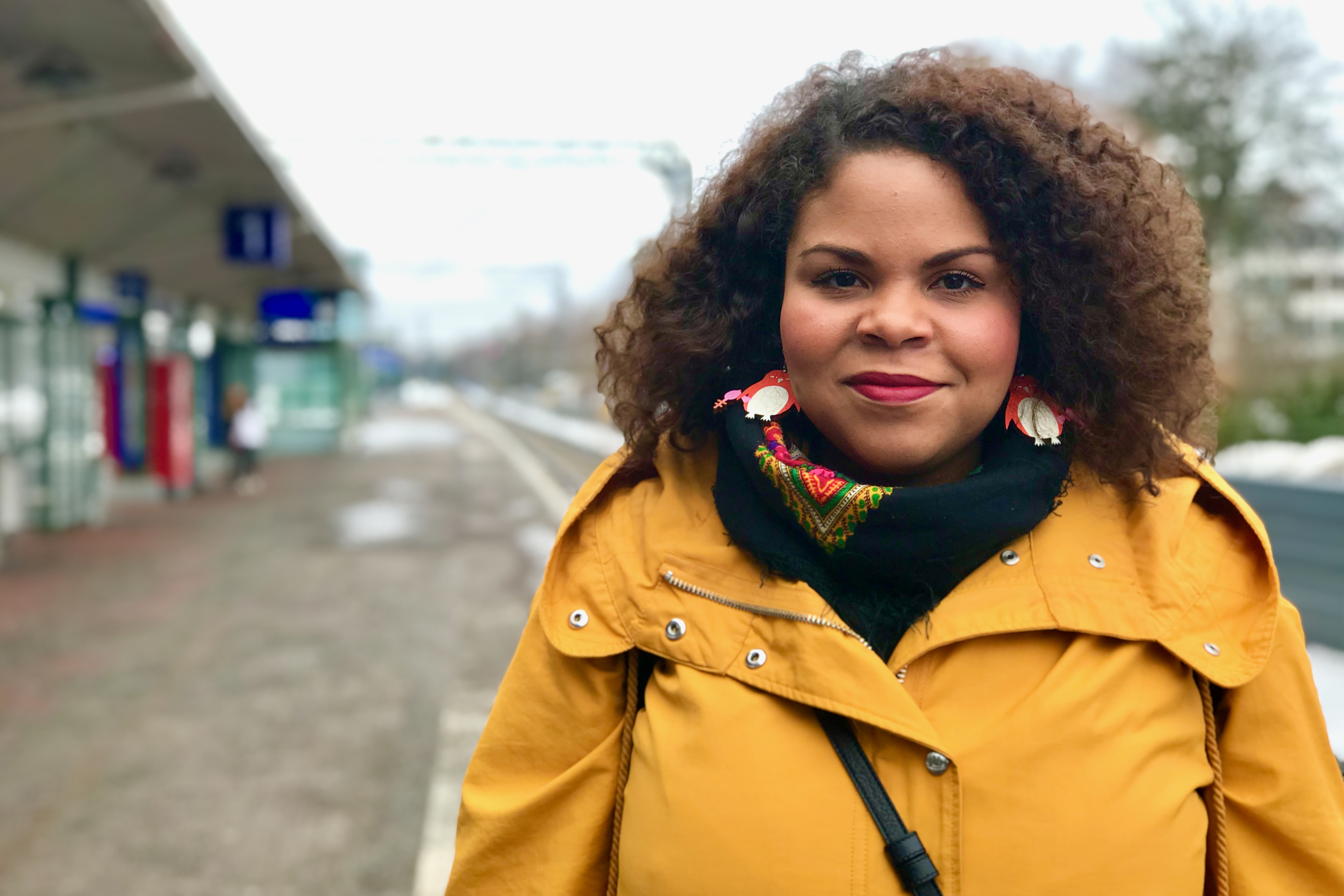

Member of the Finnish Parliament for Helsinki
- Incumbent
- Assumed office 5 April 2023

Personal details
- Born: 1986 (age 39–40) Vantaa, Finland
- Party: Green League
- Website: https://www.fatimdiarra.fi/

Fatim Winshett El Habib Diarra (born 1986) is a Finnish politician.

== Biography ==
She was elected to the Parliament of Finland from the Helsinki constituency in the 2023 Finnish parliamentary election. She has been a city councilor in Helsinki since 2017, and was elected Chair of the City Council of Helsinki in June 2021. She served as a deputy chairperson of her party Green League from 2019 to 2021.

Diarra chairs Naisasialiitto Unioni, the oldest feminist organization in Finland, and in June 2021 she was elected to the Board of Administration of the European Women’s Lobby (EWL).

She is active also in the Black Lives Matter movement and for body positivity. In the past, Fatim Diarra was active in the scout movement.

Diarra was born to a Finnish mother and Malian father.
