= Mai Kivelä =

Finnish politician (born 1982)

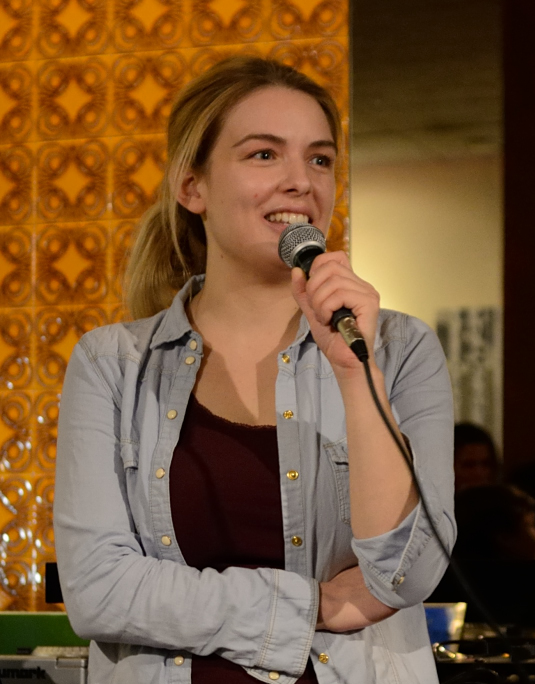

Member of parliament
- Incumbent
- Assumed office 2019

Personal details
- Born: December 20, 1982 (age 43)
- Party: Left Youth (2013–2015)
- Education: King's College London

Mai Kivelä (born 20 December 1982) is a Finnish member of parliament, a human rights activist and a feminist. She served as the general secretary of the Finnish Left Youth in the years 2013 – 2015.

Kivelä has operated in numerous non-governmental organisations, amongst others Greenpeace, Teollisuusalojen ammattiliitto (Industrial Union TEAM), and Kepa ry (Service Centre for Development Cooperation). Within the Left Alliance (Vasemmistoliitto), she has placements in the task force for environment, as vice chairman in Kallion Vasemmisto (Left Alliance in Kallio), and as board member in the Finnish UN Association.

Having previously completed studies in sociology and civic participation, in 2013 she graduated an MSc in Environment and Development from King's College in London.

In the 2019 parliamentary election, Kivelä was voted into parliament as a representative from the Helsinki constituency. She received the largest number of votes of the Left Alliance's chosen representatives in Helsinki, garnering 6 790 votes.
