= Terhi Koulumies =

Finnish politician

Member of the Finnish Parliament for Helsinki

Personal details
- Born: 1972 (age 53–54)
- Party: National Coalition Party

Terhi Koulumies (born 1972) is a Finnish politician currently serving in the Parliament of Finland for the National Coalition Party at the Helsinki constituency.
