= Margit Borg-Sundman =

Finnish politician (1902–1992)

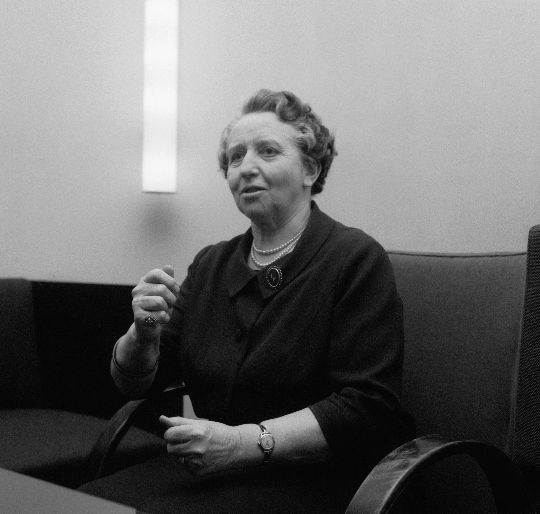
Margit Borg-Sundman in 1965

Margit Rode Sofia Borg-Sundman (16 October 1902 – 10 June 1992; née Borg) was a Finnish politician, born in Turku. She was a member of the Parliament of Finland from 1948 to 1954 and from 1958 to 1970, representing the National Coalition Party. She was a presidential elector in the 1950 1956, 1962 and 1968 presidential elections.
