= John Österholm (politician) =

Finnish politician

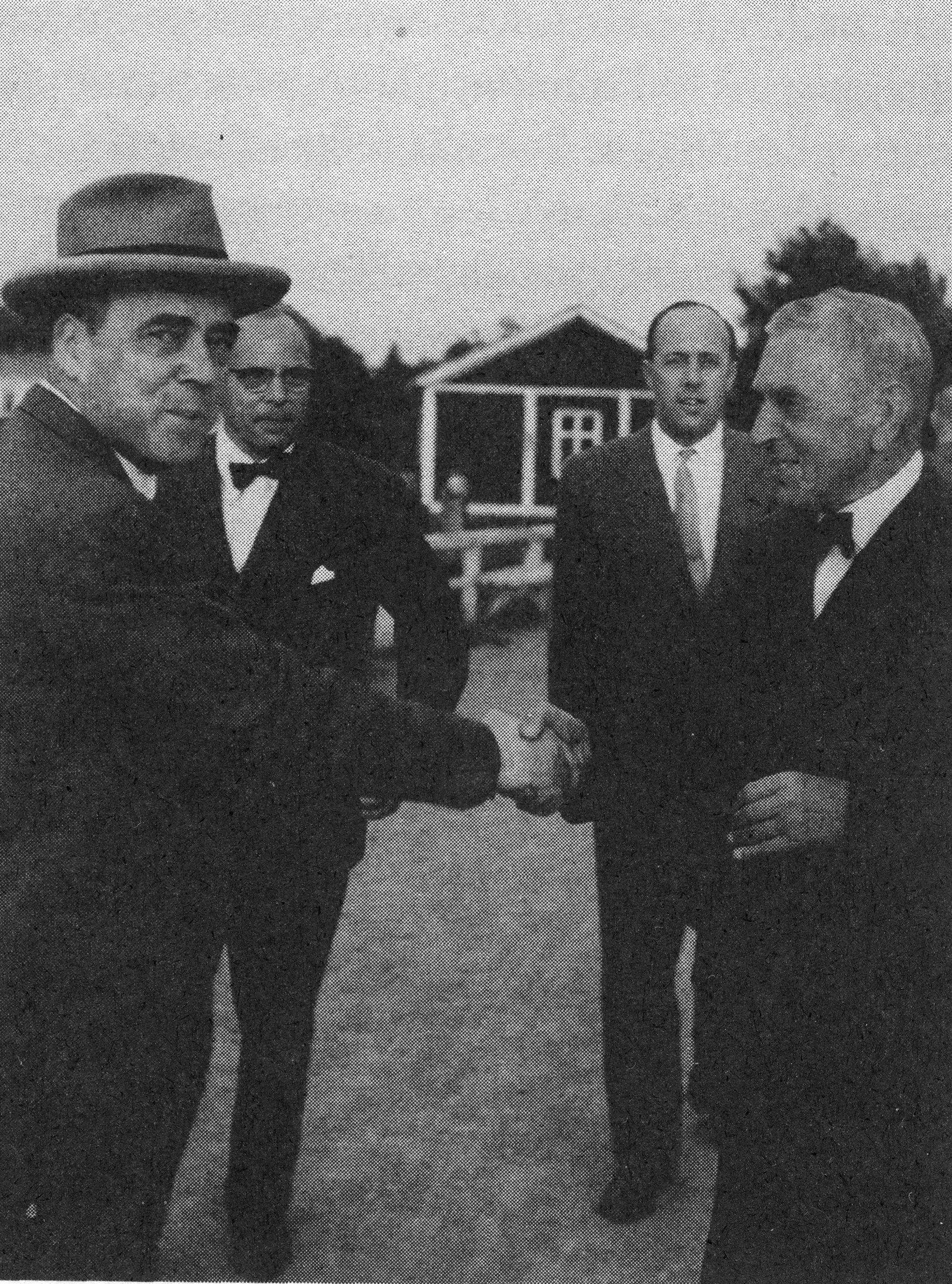
John Österholm (right) shakes hands with Ralf Törngren in the 1950s

John Emil Österholm (5 October 1882 Ekenäs – 16 November 1960 Helsinki) was a Finnish politician and journalist. He was a member of the Parliament of Finland for the Swedish People's Party of Finland in 1919–1960. After World War II, Österholm was member of the Finnish delegation at the Paris Peace Treaties.
