= Erkki Hara =

Finnish jurist and politician (1914–1997)

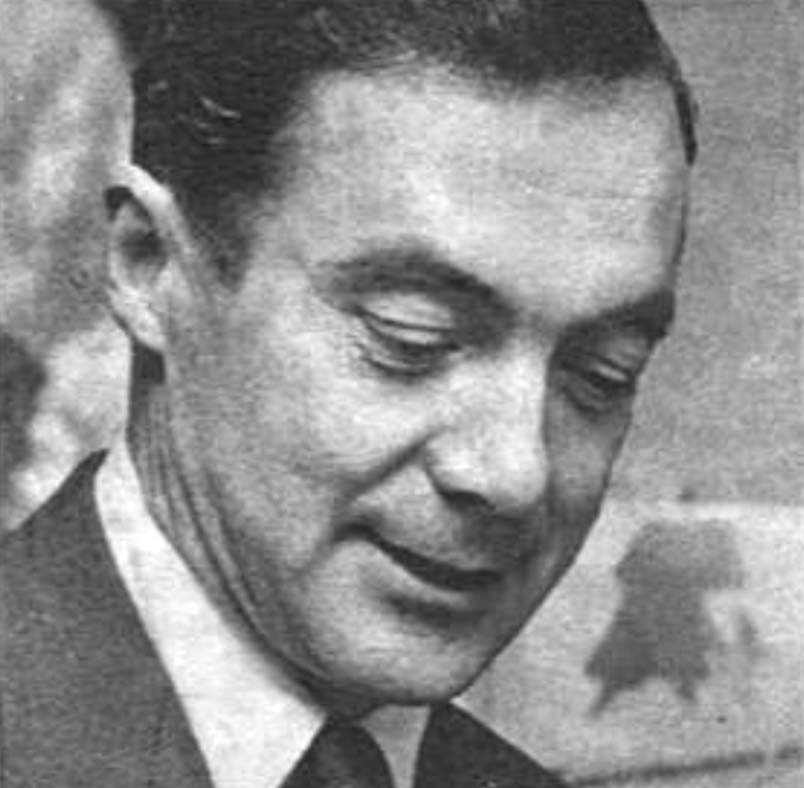
Erkki Hara

Erkki Jalmari Hara (27 April 1914 – 1 January 1997; surname until 1938 Hartzell) was a Finnish jurist and politician, born in Helsinki. He was a member of the Parliament of Finland from 1958 to 1972, representing the National Coalition Party. He was a presidential elector in the 1962 and 1968 presidential elections.
