= Kirsi Piha =

Finnish politician

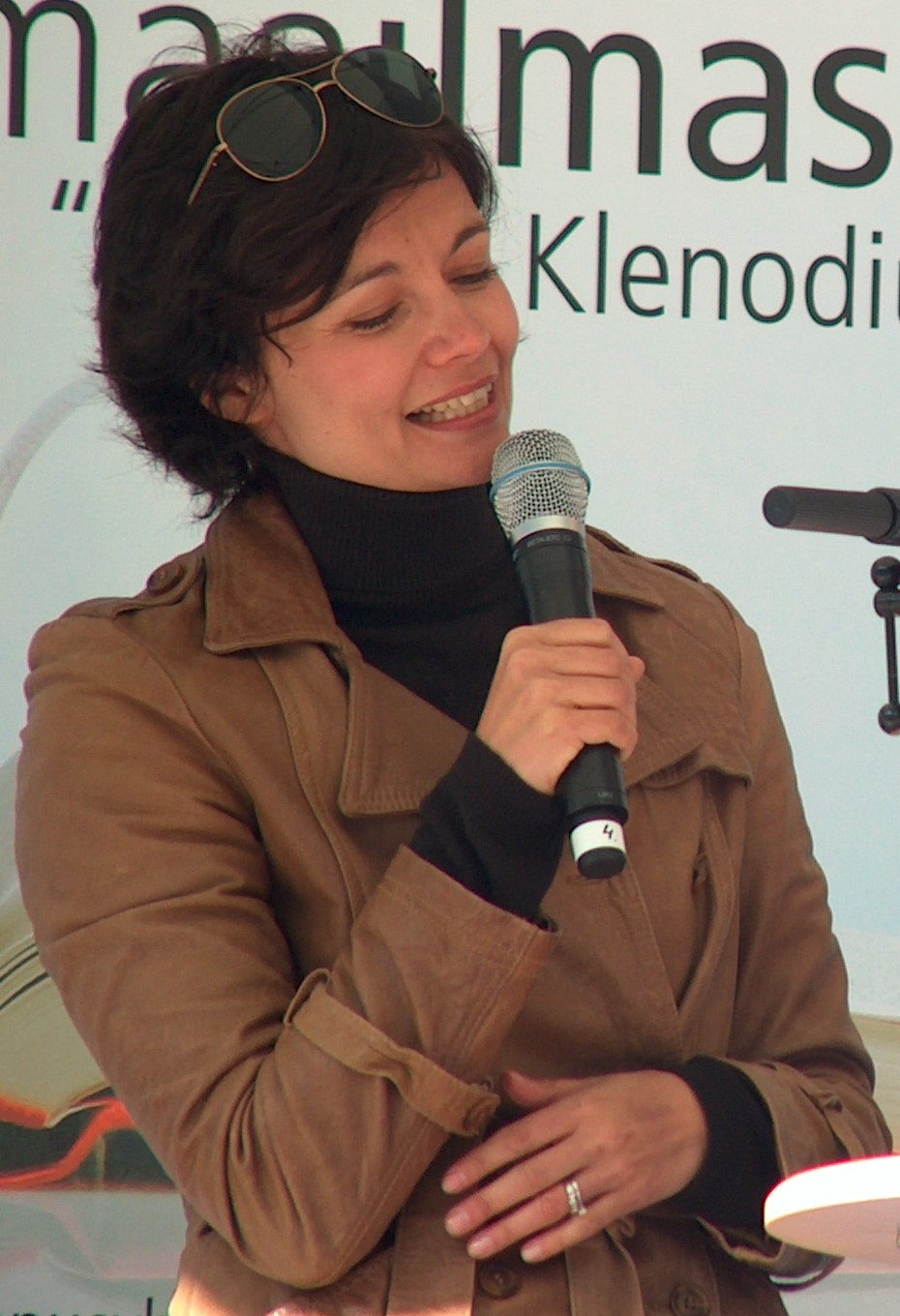
- Kirsi Piha in 2008

Member of the European Parliament
- In office 1996–1999

Member of City Council of Helsinki
- In office 1992–1996

Personal details
- Born: 14 October 1967 (age 58) Helsinki, Finland
- Party: National Coalition Party
- Spouse: Marco Mäkinen (m. 2016)

Kirsi Katariina Piha (born 14 October 1967 in Helsinki, Finland) is a Finnish Communications consultant and former politician. Piha's party is National Coalition Party. She was a member of City Council of Helsinki from 1992 to 1996. Piha was a member of parliament from May 1994 to November 1996 and then March 1999 to March 2003. She has a degree of Master of Science in Economics. Piha has published several books like Äitijohtaja (2006) and Rytmihäiriö (2015).

In March 2016 she married Marco Mäkinen.
