= Sirpa Asko-Seljavaara =

Finnish politician

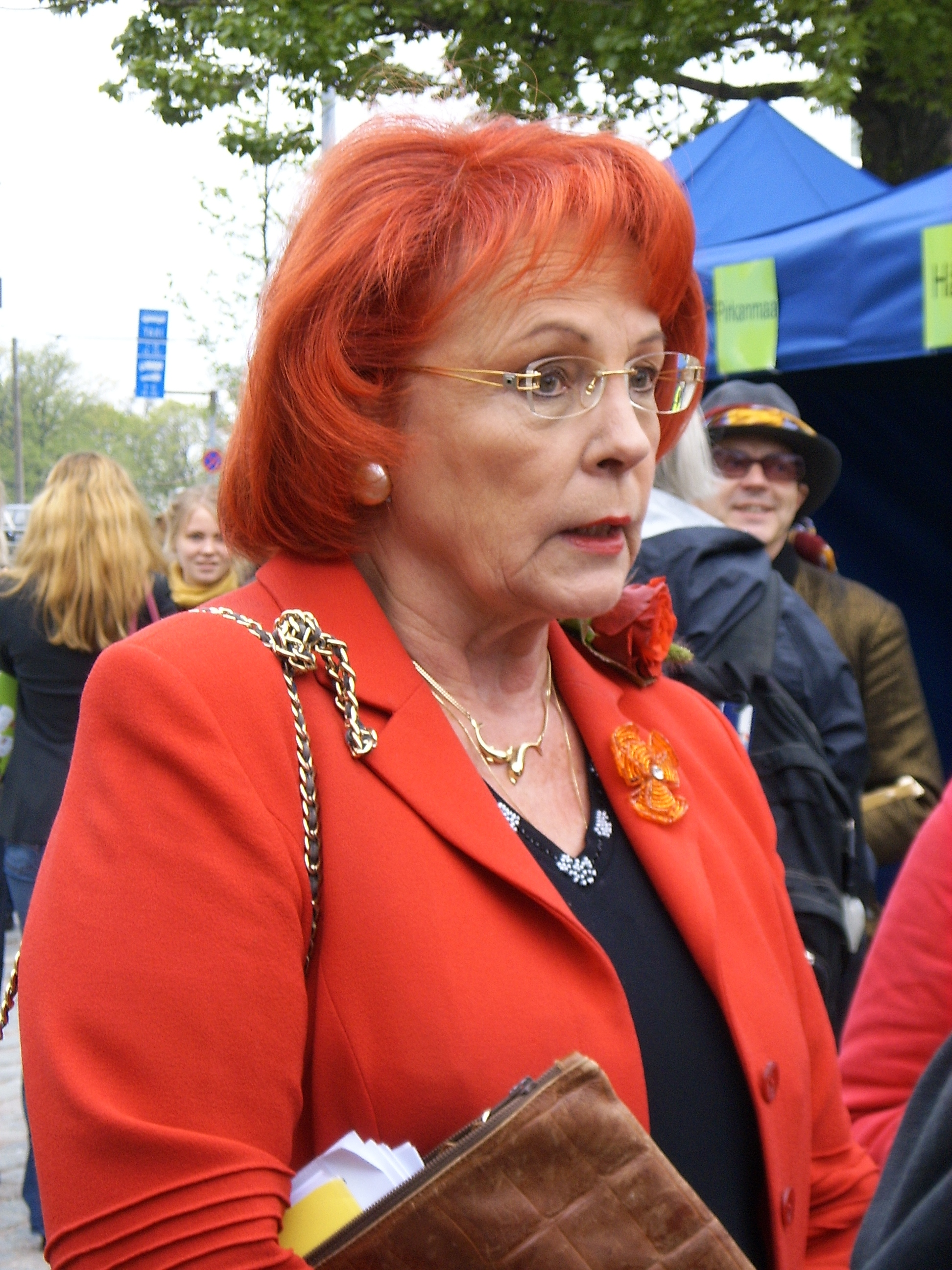
Asko-Seljavaara in 2007

Sirpa-Liisa Asko-Seljavaara (born 12 October 1939 in Helsinki, Finland) is a Finnish plastic surgeon and politician. Asko-Seljavaara was National Coalition Party's Member of Finnish Parliament from 2003 to 2011.

She is the daughter of vuorineuvos Aukusti Asko-Avonius and Viola Asko-Avonius.

In 1968 she married Seppo Seljavaara. They have two children.
