= Reijo Enävaara =

Finnish journalist and politician

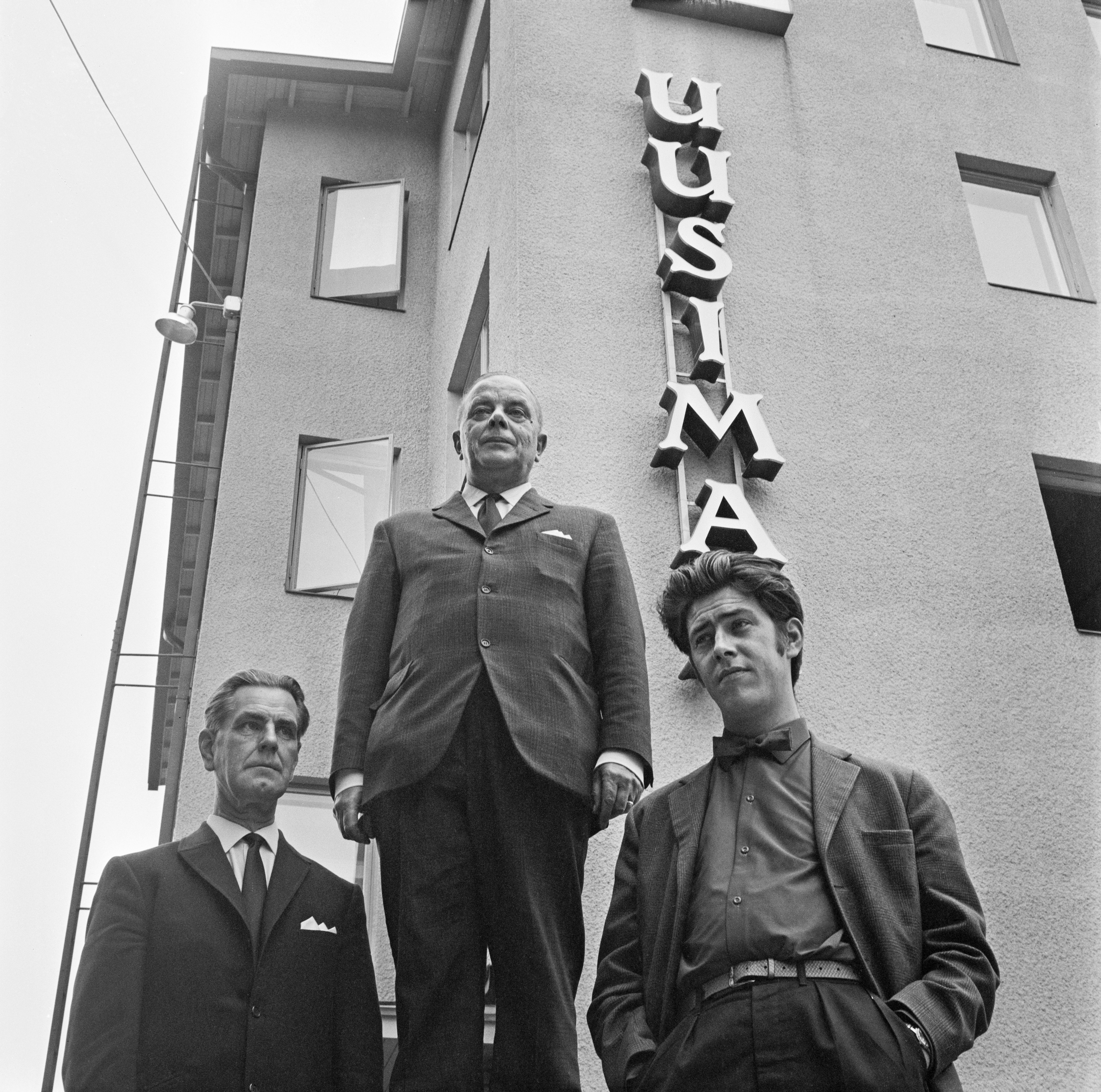
Reijo Enävaara (right)

Reijo Aukusti Enävaara (3 April 1938, Helsinki – 6 August 1984) was a Finnish journalist and politician. He served as a Member of the Parliament of Finland from 1983 until his death in 1984, representing the Finnish Rural Party (SMP).
