= Yrjö Kilpeläinen =

Finnish politician (1907–1955)

Yrjö Kaarle Kilpeläinen (3 October 1907, Leppävirta – 30 January 1955) was a Finnish journalist, educationist and politician. He was a Member of the Parliament of Finland from 1945 until his death in 1955, representing the Social Democratic Party of Finland (SDP). He belonged to the right wing of the party.
