= Seija Karkinen =

Finnish jurist and politician (born 1936)

Seija Marjatta Karkinen (born 16 October 1936; née Räty) was a Finnish jurist and politician, born in Sortavala. She was a member of the Parliament of Finland from 1966 to 1983 and from 1986 to 1991, representing the Social Democratic Party of Finland (SDP). She served as Deputy Minister of Finance from 31 May to 4 September 1972 and Minister of Social Affairs and Health from 4 September 1972 to 13 June 1975. She was a presidential elector in the 1968, 1978 and 1982 presidential elections.
