= Eveliina Heinäluoma =

Finnish politician

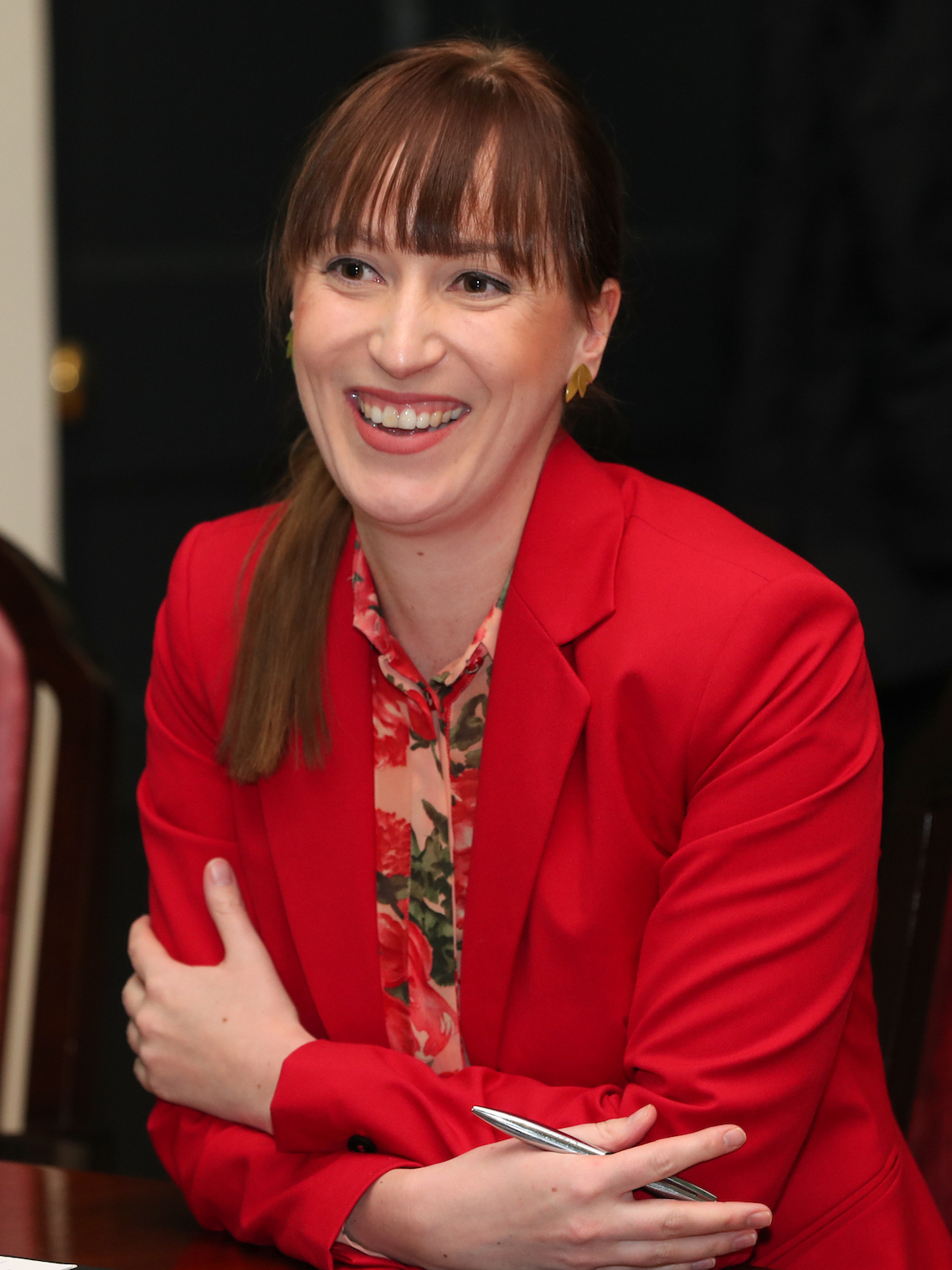
- Heinäluoma in November 2022

Member of the Finnish Parliament for Helsinki

Personal details
- Born: February 27, 1988 (age 38) Helsinki, Uusimaa, Finland
- Party: Social Democratic Party of Finland
- Children: 1

Eveliina Rosa Heinäluoma (born 27 February 1988 in Helsinki) is a Finnish politician currently serving in the Parliament of Finland for the Social Democratic Party of Finland at the Helsinki constituency.

MEP and the former Speaker of the Finnish parliament, Eero Heinäluoma, is Eveliina Heinäluoma's father. Eveliina Heinäluoma gave birth to her first child in July 2024.
