= Nasima Razmyar =

Finnish politician (born 1984)

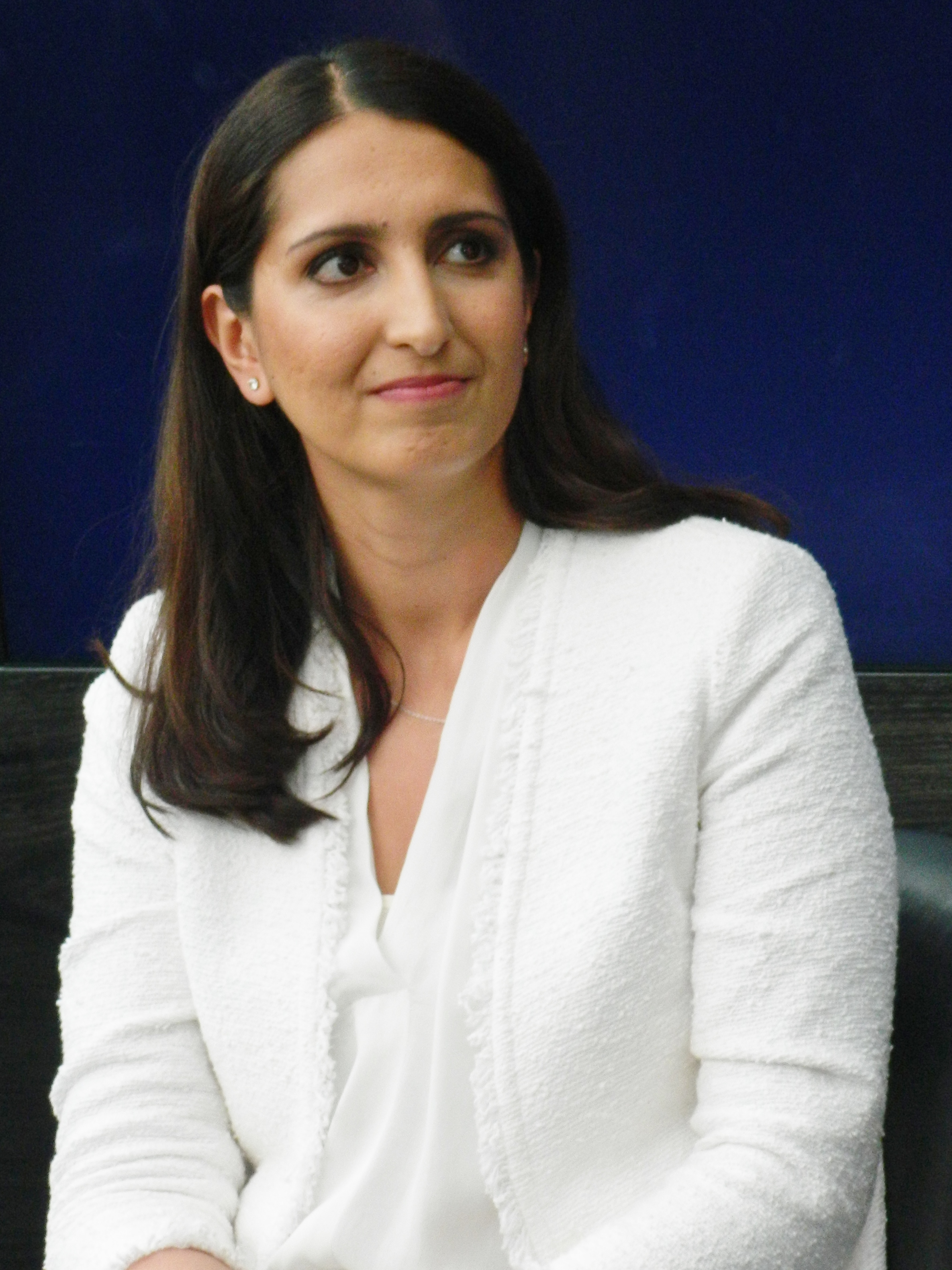
- Razmyar in 2017
- Born: 13 September 1984 (age 42); Kabul Province, Afghanistan
- Citizenship: Finnish, Afghan
- Occupation: Politician
- Years active: 2008–present
- Title: Member of Finnish Parliament
- Term: 2015–2017
- Political party: Social Democratic Party of Finland
- Father: Mohammad Daoud Razmyar

Nasima Razmyar (born 13 September 1984) is a Finnish politician, representing the Social Democratic Party. Razmyar was elected to the Finnish Parliament in 2015, gaining 5,156 votes in the elections. She served in the Parliament until June 2017, when she was chosen as the Deputy Mayor for culture and leisure in Helsinki. She has also been a member of the City Council of Helsinki since 2012.

Razmyar was born in Kabul in the Democratic Republic of Afghanistan. Her mother tongue is Dari. Razmyar's family came to Finland from Moscow where her father Mohammad Daoud Razmyar served as the Ambassador of the Democratic Republic of Afghanistan to the Soviet Union. The family moved to Finland in 1993, after then Afghan President Mohammad Najibullah was ousted from power. She is a dual citizen of Afghanistan and Finland. In 2010 Razmyar was named the Finnish Refugee Woman of the Year.

Razmyar has two children with her husband Johan Fager.
