= Anna-Liisa Hyvönen =

Finnish politician (1926–2021)

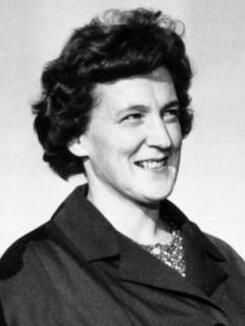
- Hyvönen in 1966.

Member of the Parliament of Finland
- In office 22 January 1972 – 30 September 1980

Personal details
- Born: 29 July 1926 Helsinki, Finland
- Died: 1 December 2021 (aged 95) Helsinki
- Party: SKDL

Anna-Liisa Hyvönen (29 July 1926 – 1 December 2021) was a Finnish politician. A member of the Finnish People's Democratic League, she served in the Parliament of Finland from 1972 to 1980.
