= Outi Ojala =

Finnish politician (1946–2017)

Outi Ojala MEP
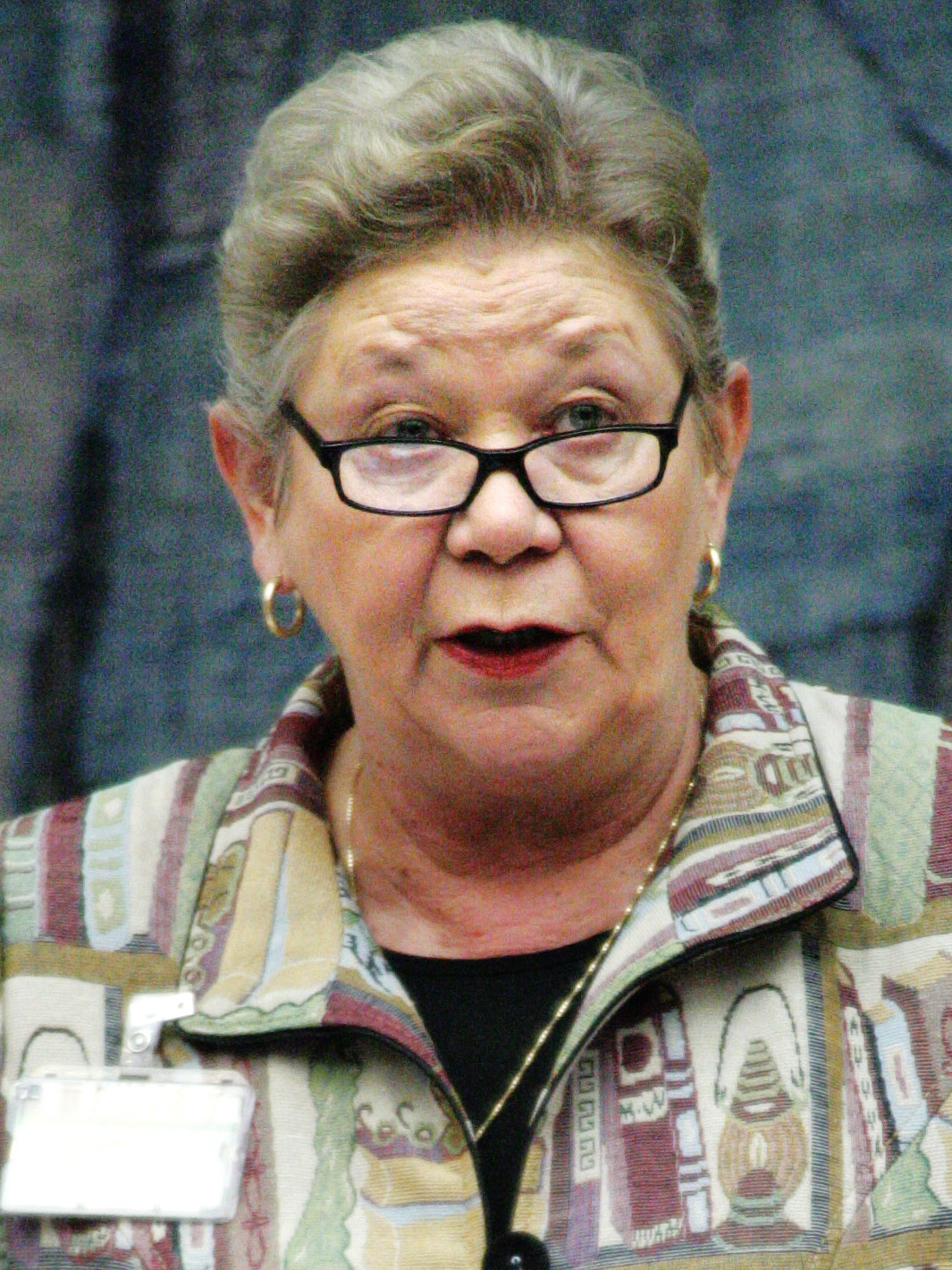
- Outi Ojala in 2006 in Copenhagen, at the Nordic Council.

Member of the European Parliament
- In office 1996–1999
- Constituency: Finland

Personal details
- Born: 28 June 1946 Lappeenranta, Finland
- Died: 16 May 2017 (aged 70) Lassila, Helsinki, Finland

Outi Marjatta Ojala (28 June 1946, Lappee – 16 May 2017) was a Finnish politician of the Left Alliance. She served as a member of the Parliament of Finland from 1991 to 1996 and from 1999 to 2007, and as a Member of the European Parliament from 1996 to 1999. She was President of the Nordic Council in 2002.

Ojala trained as a nurse and was involved in trade unions and local politics in Helsinki, where she was a city councillor 1989–1996 and 2001–2012.

== Positions ==
- Chairperson of the National Advisory Board on Romani Affairs 1996–2001
