= Kaarlo Pitsinki =

Finnish politician (1923–2015)

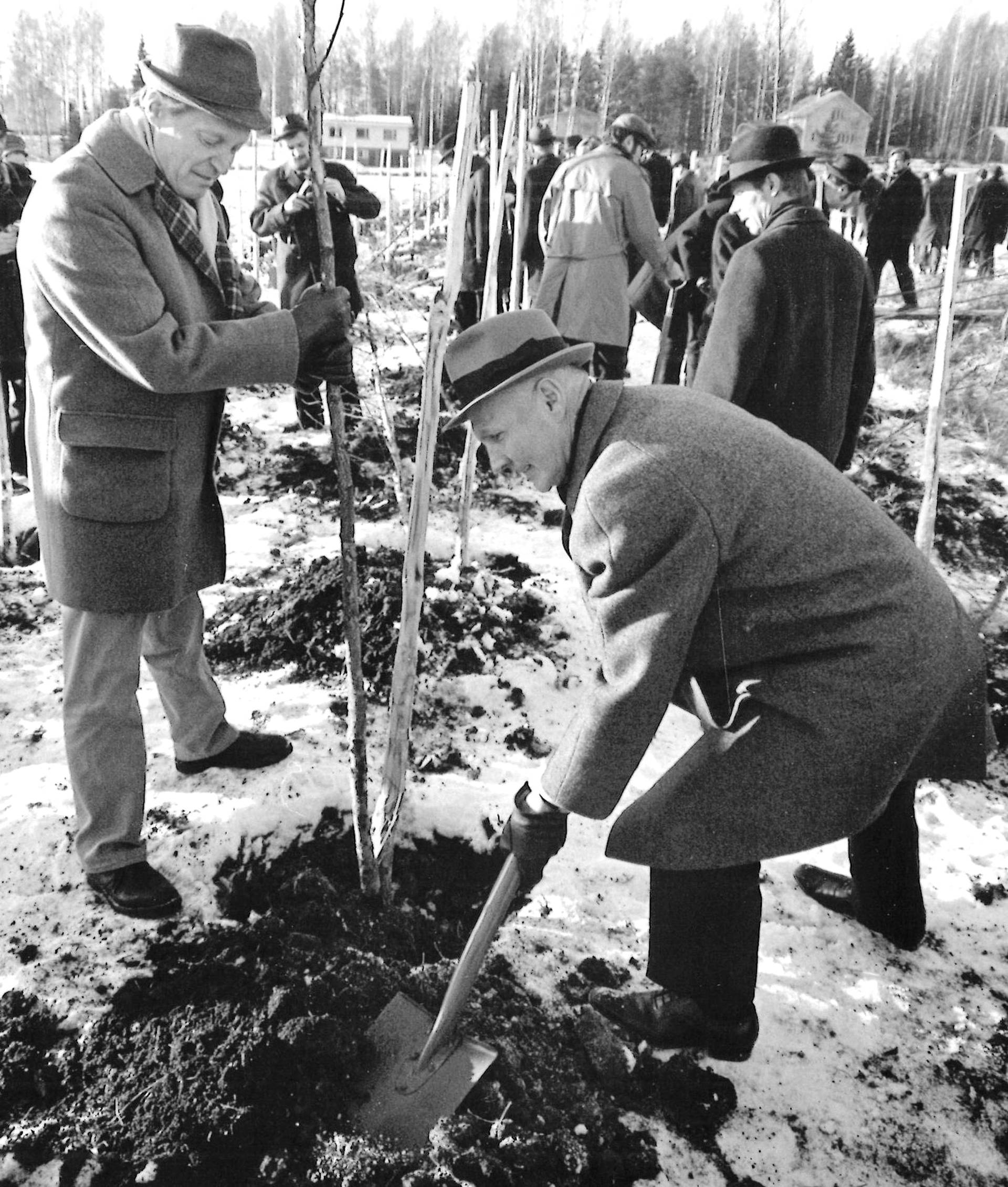
Kaarlo Pitsinki and Eino Sirén in 1970.

Kaarlo Vilhelmi Pitsinki (27 December 1923 – 26 August 2015) was a Finnish politician, born in Kemi. He was a member of the Parliament of Finland from 1958 to 1966, representing the Social Democratic Party of Finland (SDP). Pitsinki was the party secretary of the SDP from 1957 to 1966. He was the governor of Uusimaa Province from 1966 to 1982. He was a presidential elector in the 1962 and 1968 presidential elections.
