= Ingvar S. Melin =

Finnish politician (1932–2011)

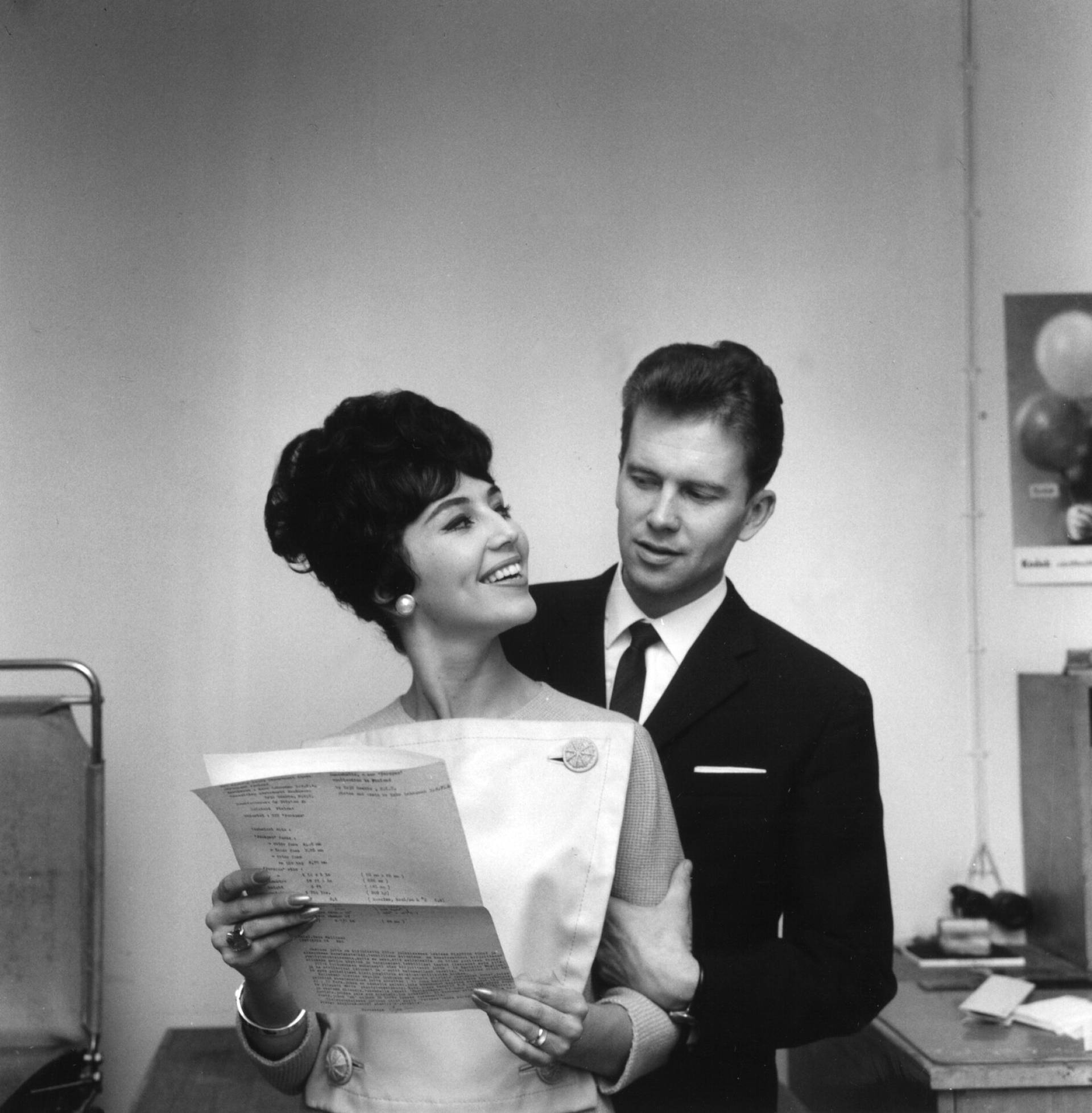
Melin with his wife, journalist Lenita Airisto (1961)

Ingvar Selimson Melin (29 June 1932 – 10 June 2011) was a Finnish politician, born in Pedersöre. He was a member of the Parliament of Finland from 1966 to 1972, from 1975 to 1983 and from 1987 to 1991, representing the Swedish People's Party of Finland. He served as Minister of Defence from 30 November 1975 to 29 September 1976. He was a presidential elector in the 1968, 1978, 1982 and 1988 presidential elections.
