= Leo Mattila =

Finnish racing driver, business executive and politician (1923–1979)

Leo Ilmari (Leo I.) Mattila (9 December 1923 – 2 March 1979) was a Finnish racing driver, business executive and politician, born in Helsinki.

== Biography ==
He was a member of the Parliament of Finland from 1954 to 1958 and from 1962 to 1966, representing the People's Party of Finland until 1965 and the Liberal People's Party (LKP) after that. He was a presidential elector in the 1956 and 1962 presidential elections.
