= Armi Hosia =

Finnish politician (1909–1992)

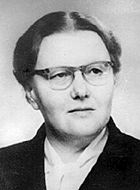
Armi Hosia.

Armi Laila Hosia (28 June 1909 – 9 July 1992; née Kurkinen) was a Finnish politician. She served as Minister of Education from 13 April 1962 to 18 December 1963. Hosia was born in Joensuu, and was a Member of the Parliament of Finland, representing the People's Party of Finland from 1954 to 1965 and the Liberal People's Party from 1965 to 1966.
