= Pirkko Aro =

Finnish journalist and politician

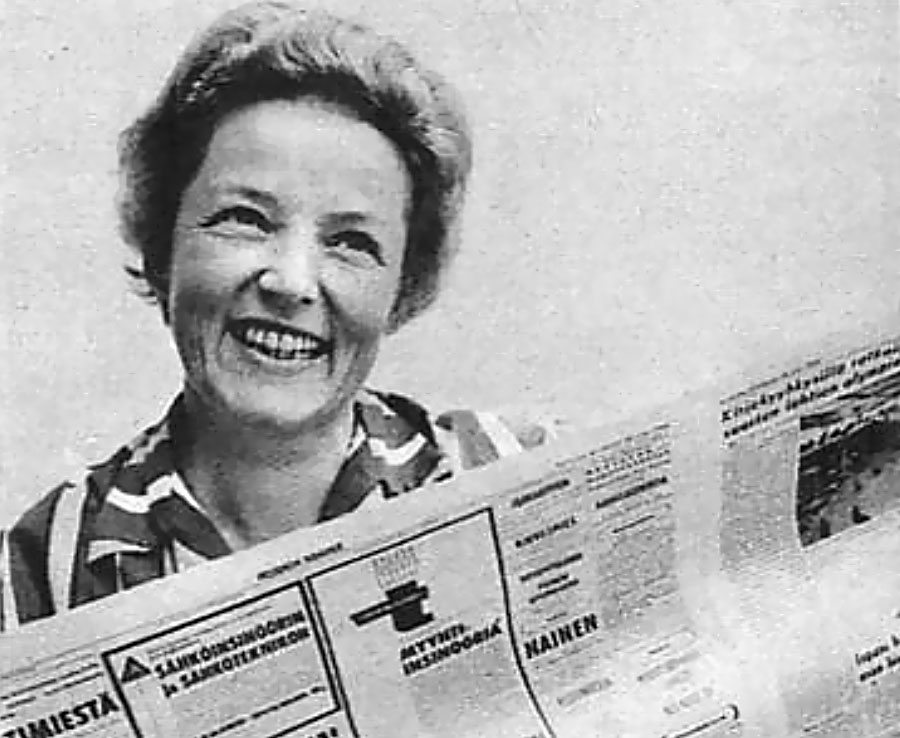
pirkko Aro picture

Pirkko Ritva Aro (née Ihari; 28 March 1923, Vihti – 9 November 2012) was a Finnish journalist and politician. She began her political career as a city councillor for the Liberal League. Later she was elected to the Parliament of Finland, where she represented the Liberal People's Party (LKP) from 1966 to 1973 and the Social Democratic Party of Finland (SDP) from 1973 to 1979.
