= Jouni Apajalahti =

Finnish Lutheran pastor, writer and politician (1920–2009)

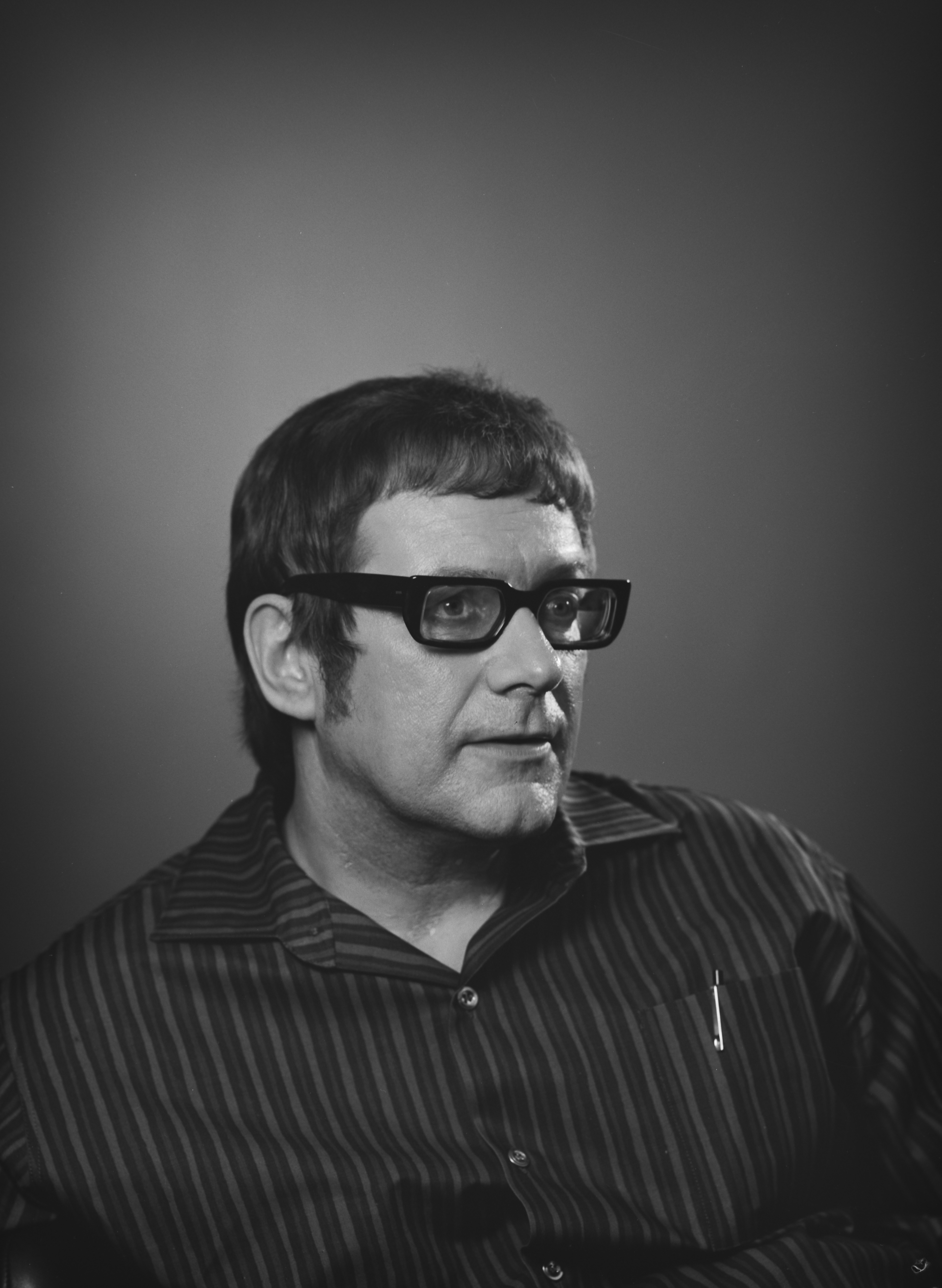
Jouni Apajalahti in 1972

Jouni Arto Aarre Apajalahti (10 April 1920 – 31 May 2009) was a Finnish Lutheran pastor, writer and politician, born in Kemi. He was a member of the Parliament of Finland from 1966 to 1970, representing the National Coalition Party.
