= Rakel Hiltunen =

Finnish politician

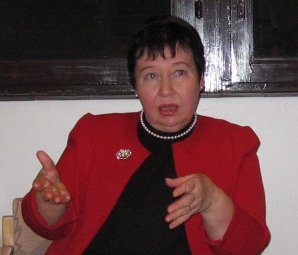
- Rakel Hiltunen in Jakomäki, Helsinki, 2006
- Born: Lea Rakel Lyytikäinen; 1 July 1940 (age 86); Keitele, Finland
- Other name: Lea Rakel Hiltunen
- Occupations: social worker and politician
- Years active: 1999–2015
- Known for: member, Parliament of Finland
- Political party: Social Democratic Party of Finland

Lea Rakel Hiltunen (née Lyytikäinen; born 2 July 1940 in Keitele) is a Finnish social worker and politician. She was a member of the Parliament of Finland from 1999 to 2015, representing the Social Democratic Party of Finland (SDP).
