= Tyyne Paasivuori =

Finnish politician (1907–1974)

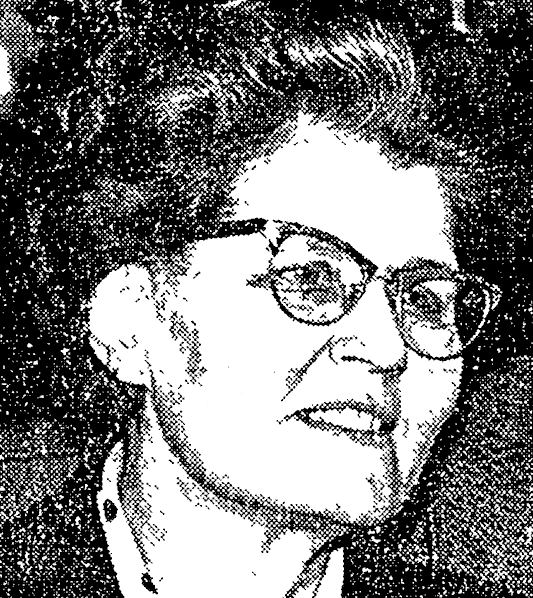

Tyyne Maria Paasivuori (23 December 1907 – 28 July 1974; née Kallio) was a Finnish politician, born in Kokemäki. She was a member of the Parliament of Finland from 1954 to 1958 and from 1962 until her death in 1974, representing the Social Democratic Party of Finland (SDP). She was a presidential elector in the 1956 and 1962 presidential elections.
