= Veronika Honkasalo =

Finnish politician (born 1975)

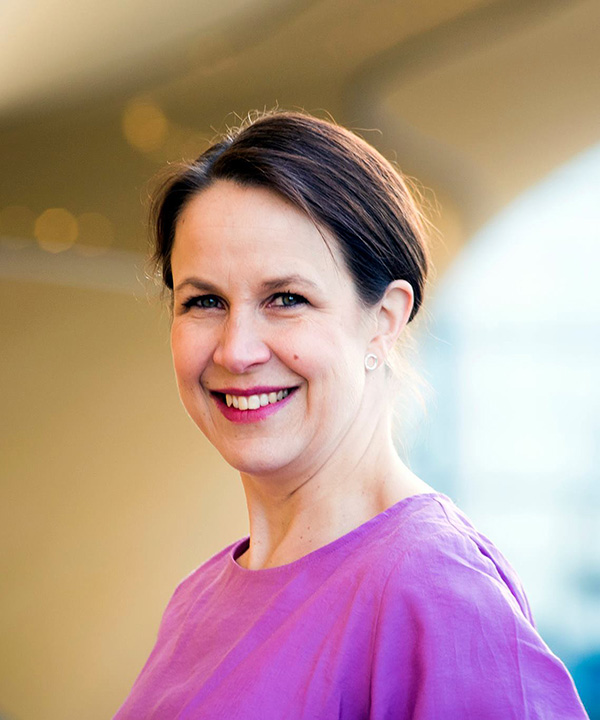
- Honkasalo in 2018

Member of the Finnish Parliament for Helsinki
- Incumbent
- Assumed office 17 April 2019

Personal details
- Born: 7 July 1975 (age 50) Lappeenranta, South Karelia, Finland
- Party: Left Alliance

Veronika Honkasalo (born 7 July 1975 in Lappeenranta) is a Finnish politician currently serving in the Parliament of Finland for the Left Alliance at the Helsinki constituency.

== Academic career ==
She earned a doctorate in social sciences in 2012 and was appointed an associate professor in 2018. She is a researcher at the Youth Research Society and has published several papers on youth related research.

== Political career ==
She entered the city council of Helsinki in 2012 and was elected to the Finnish parliament in 2019.

=== Political positions ===
She is opposed to Palestinians being forcibly expelled from their land to make way for Israeli settlements and introduced a motion proposing an import ban on products produced by the inhabitants of such settlements in accordance with Article 49 of the Geneva Convention.
