= Pirkanmaa (parliamentary electoral district) =

Electoral district of the Parliament of Finland

- Birkaland
- Electoral District for the Parliament of Finland
- Location of Pirkanmaa within Finland
- Municipality: List: Akaa; Hämeenkyrö; Ikaalinen; Juupajoki; Kangasala; Kihniö; Kuhmoinen; Lempäälä; Mänttä-Vilppula; Nokia; Orivesi; Pälkäne; Parkano; Pirkkala; Punkalaidun; Ruovesi; Sastamala; Tampere; Urjala; Valkeakoski; Vesilahti; Virrat; Ylöjärvi
- Region: Pirkanmaa
- Population: 532,775 (2022)
- Electorate: 437,155 (2023)
- Area: 15,550 km^{2} (2022)

Current Electoral District
- Created: 1907
- Seats: List: 20 (2023–present); 19 (2015–2023); 18 (2003–2015); 16 (1995–2003); 15 (1991–1995); 13 (1970–1991); 12 (1962–1970); 13 (1951–1962); 12 (1948–1951); 11 (1907–1948)
- Members of Parliament: List: Marko Asell (SDP); Miko Bergbom (PS); Anna-Kaisa Ikonen (Kok; Aleksi Jäntti (Kok; Pauli Kiuru (Kok); Anna Kontula (Vas); Lauri Lyly (SDP); Sanna Marin (SDP); Ville Merinen (SDP); Veijo Niemi (PS); Ilmari Nurminen (SDP); Jouni Ovaska (Kesk); Sakari Puisto (PS); Arto Satonen (Kok); Sami Savio (PS); Sari Tanus (KD); Oras Tynkkynen (Vihr); Joakim Vigelius (PS); Pia Viitanen (SDP); Sofia Vikman (Kok)

Pirkanmaa (Swedish: Birkaland) is one of the 13 electoral districts of the Parliament of Finland, the national legislature of Finland. The district was established as Häme Province North (Finnish: Hämeen läänin pohjoinen vaalipiiri; Swedish: Tavastehus läns norra valkrets) in 1907 when the Diet of Finland was replaced by the Parliament of Finland. It was renamed Pirkanmaa in 1997. It is conterminous with the region of Pirkanmaa. The district currently elects 20 of the 200 members of the Parliament of Finland using the open party-list proportional representation electoral system. At the 2023 parliamentary election it had 437,155 registered electors.

== History ==
Häme Province North was one 16 electoral districts established by the Election Act of the Grand Duchy of Finland (Suomen Suuriruhtinaanmaan Vaalilaki) passed by the Diet of Finland in 1906. It consisted of the hundreds (kihlakunta) of Jämsä, Pirkkala and Ruovesi in the province of Häme. Viiala municipality was transferred from Häme Province North to Häme Province South in 1951. Virrat municipality was transferred from Vaasa Province to Häme Province North in 1969.

In 1990, the municipalities of Kylmäkoski, Toijala, Valkeakoski and Viiala were transferred from Häme Province South to Häme Province North. The municipalities of Hämeenkyrö, Ikaalinen, Kihniö, Mouhijärvi, Parkano and Viljakkala were transferred from Turku Province North to Häme Province North in 1993. The district was renamed Pirkanmaa in 1997.

In 1998, the municipalities of Äetsä, Suodenniemi and Vammala were transferred from Satakunta to Pirkanmaa and Urjala municipality was transferred from Häme to Pirkanmaa. Punkalaidun municipality was transferred from Satakunta to Pirkanmaa in 2005. Kuhmoinen municipality was transferred from Central Finland to Pirkanmaa in 2021.

== Electoral system ==
Pirkanmaa currently elects 20 of the 200 members of the Parliament of Finland using the open party-list proportional representation electoral system. Parties may form electoral alliances with each other to pool their votes and increase their chances of winning seats. However, the number of candidates nominated by an electoral alliance may not exceed the maximum number of candidates that a single party may nominate. Seats are allocated using the D'Hondt method.

== Election results ==
=== Summary ===
Election	Left Alliance Vas / SKDL / STPV / SSTP			Green League Vihr			Social Democrats SDP / SDTP / SDP			Swedish People's SFP			Centre Kesk / ML			Liberals Lib / LKP / SK / KE / NP			National Coalition Kok / SP			Christian Democrats KD / SKL			Finns PS / SMP / SPP		
Election	Votes	%	Seats	Votes	%	Seats	Votes	%	Seats	Votes	%	Seats	Votes	%	Seats	Votes	%	Seats	Votes	%	Seats	Votes	%	Seats	Votes	%	Seats
2023	21,307	6.87%	1	23,241	7.50%	1	80,131	25.85%	6	937	0.30%	0	22,010	7.10%	1				66,545	21.47%	5	16,912	5.46%	1	62,496	20.16%	5
2019	24,341	8.14%	1	37,152	12.42%	2	66,109	22.10%	5	327	0.11%	0	26,536	8.87%	2				55,244	18.47%	4	17,180	5.74%	1	51,819	17.32%	4
2015	21,780	7.83%	1	28,537	10.26%	2	54,220	19.50%	4				46,189	16.61%	3				54,648	19.65%	4	13,553	4.87%	1	49,551	17.82%	4
2011	22,817	8.33%	1	22,672	8.28%	1	59,201	21.61%	4				28,597	10.44%	2				61,034	22.28%	5	13,605	4.97%	1	57,844	21.12%	4
2007	24,304	9.63%	2	22,056	8.74%	1	60,160	23.83%	5				41,126	16.29%	3	847	0.34%	0	63,399	25.11%	5	15,681	6.21%	1	12,378	4.90%	1
2003	30,979	12.53%	2	24,050	9.73%	2	63,382	25.64%	5				40,957	16.57%	3	597	0.24%	0	56,443	22.83%	5	14,991	6.06%	1	1,220	0.49%	0
1999	35,555	16.02%	3	15,545	7.00%	1	52,750	23.76%	4				32,635	14.70%	2	1,777	0.80%	0	53,476	24.09%	5	10,103	4.55%	1	1,320	0.59%	0
1995	31,981	14.09%	2	15,353	6.77%	1	69,153	30.48%	6				30,034	13.24%	2	3,342	1.47%	0	46,184	20.35%	4	5,826	2.57%	0	3,139	1.38%	0
1991	29,050	14.50%	2	15,067	7.52%	1	50,487	25.19%	4				22,885	11.42%	2	2,109	1.05%	0	50,433	25.17%	4	5,758	2.87%	1	21,277	10.62%	1
1987	17,621	9.27%	1	8,702	4.58%	0	52,042	27.39%	4				12,650	6.66%	1	3,021	1.59%	0	56,906	29.94%	5	4,976	2.62%	0	13,474	7.09%	1
1983	38,807	19.85%	3	2,624	1.34%	0	57,596	29.47%	4				14,849	7.60%	1				54,373	27.82%	4	9,721	4.97%	0	16,775	8.58%	1
1979	46,280	24.16%	3				51,617	26.95%	4				14,907	7.78%	1	5,651	2.95%	0	54,389	28.39%	4	9,567	4.99%	1	6,653	3.47%	0
1975	46,832	25.59%	4				52,613	28.75%	4				15,760	8.61%	1	7,642	4.18%	0	44,283	24.20%	3	6,857	3.75%	1	3,725	2.04%	0
1972	36,013	21.20%	3				52,945	31.17%	5				13,359	7.87%	0	6,563	3.86%	1	41,920	24.68%	3	4,637	2.73%	1	10,915	6.43%	0
1970	35,227	21.00%	3				48,459	28.89%	4				15,620	9.31%	1	8,690	5.18%	0	43,724	26.07%	4	1,280	0.76%	0	12,083	7.20%	1
1966	39,334	26.28%	4				50,738	33.91%	4				14,730	9.84%	1	7,197	4.81%	0	32,827	21.94%	3				392	0.26%	0
1962	42,172	28.90%	4				38,824	26.61%	3				17,209	11.79%	1	6,188	4.24%	1	34,440	23.60%	3				1,347	0.92%	0
1958	41,631	29.84%	5				33,082	23.72%	3				16,406	11.76%	1	6,347	4.55%	0	30,524	21.88%	3						
1954	39,189	28.39%	4				45,864	33.22%	5				16,043	11.62%	1	11,216	8.12%	1	25,363	18.37%	2						
1951	35,659	28.16%	4				43,966	34.72%	5				13,752	10.86%	1	6,746	5.33%	0	25,294	19.98%	3						
1948	33,301	27.72%	3				43,055	35.84%	5				11,450	9.53%	1	3,702	3.08%	0	27,204	22.64%	3						
1945	35,475	31.55%	3				38,019	33.82%	4				8,742	7.78%	1	5,962	5.30%	1	22,195	19.74%	2						
1939							49,684	60.40%	8				5,484	6.67%	0	5,965	7.25%	1	14,769	17.95%	2						
1936							45,056	60.47%	8				5,425	7.28%	0	5,479	7.35%	0	11,198	15.03%	2						
1933							43,334	59.58%	8				5,272	7.25%	0	6,157	8.47%	1	15,515	21.33%	2						
1930	962	1.40%	0				38,380	56.04%	7				5,598	8.17%	0	3,252	4.75%	1	17,341	25.32%	3						
1929	6,589	11.44%	1				28,298	49.12%	6				5,653	9.81%	1	4,400	7.64%	1	10,911	18.94%	2						
1927	5,154	9.36%	1				28,270	51.34%	6				4,321	7.85%	1	5,096	9.25%	1	12,081	21.94%	2						
1924	3,016	5.55%	0				28,537	52.50%	6				3,795	6.98%	1	5,743	10.56%	1	13,190	24.26%	3						
1922	3,631	7.12%	0				26,202	51.34%	7				3,201	6.27%	0	5,559	10.89%	1	12,398	24.29%	3						
1919							31,143	55.49%	7				1,432	2.55%	0	7,341	13.08%	1	13,406	23.89%	3						
1917							37,624	61.90%	7										19,798	32.57%	4						
1916							31,475	64.72%	8							4,948	10.17%	1	9,591	19.72%	2						
1913							27,830	61.37%	8							5,414	11.94%	1	9,568	21.10%	2						
1911							27,671	58.19%	7							6,271	13.19%	1	10,896	22.91%	3						
1910							27,495	56.32%	7							6,300	12.90%	1	11,677	23.92%	3						
1909							28,850	56.74%	7							6,118	12.03%	1	11,895	23.39%	3						
1908							27,886	57.06%	7							5,730	11.72%	1	11,874	24.30%	3						
1907							29,932	55.87%	7							4,728	8.83%	1	14,544	27.15%	3						

(Figures in italics represent joint lists.)

=== Detailed ===
==== 2020s ====
===== 2023 =====
Results of the 2023 parliamentary election held on 2 April 2023:

Party		Party			Electoral Alliance		
Party		Votes	%	Seats	Votes	%	Seats
Social Democratic Party of Finland	SDP	80,131	25.85%	6	80,131	25.85%	6
National Coalition Party	Kok	66,545	21.47%	5	67,482	21.77%	5
Swedish People's Party of Finland	SFP	937	0.30%	0	67,482	21.77%	5
Finns Party	PS	62,496	20.16%	5	62,496	20.16%	5
Green League	Vihr	23,241	7.50%	1	23,241	7.50%	1
Centre Party	Kesk	22,010	7.10%	1	22,010	7.10%	1
Left Alliance	Vas	21,307	6.87%	1	21,307	6.87%	1
Christian Democrats	KD	16,912	5.46%	1	16,912	5.46%	1
Movement Now	Liik	7,899	2.55%	0	7,899	2.55%	0
Freedom Alliance	VL	2,926	0.94%	0	3,663	1.18%	0
Crystal Party	KRIP	654	0.21%	0	3,663	1.18%	0
Finnish People First	SKE	83	0.03%	0	3,663	1.18%	0
Liberal Party – Freedom to Choose	Lib	2,080	0.67%	0	2,080	0.67%	0
Animal Justice Party of Finland	EOP	601	0.19%	0	752	0.24%	0
Feminist Party	FP	151	0.05%	0	752	0.24%	0
Power Belongs to the People	VKK	507	0.16%	0	507	0.16%	0
Communist Party of Finland	SKP	473	0.15%	0	473	0.15%	0
Pirate Party	Pir	450	0.15%	0	450	0.15%	0
Blue-and-Black Movement	SML	369	0.12%	0	369	0.12%	0
Kansalaisliitto	KAL	75	0.02%	0	75	0.02%	0
Timo Virtanen (Independent)		44	0.01%	0	44	0.01%	0
Petter Enkvist (Independent)		26	0.01%	0	26	0.01%	0
Pekka Heiskanen (Independent)		24	0.01%	0	24	0.01%	0
Valid votes		309,941	100.00%	20	309,941	100.00%	20
Rejected votes		1,157	0.37%				
Total polled		311,098	71.16%				
Registered electors		437,155					

The following candidates were elected: Marko Asell (SDP), 4,540 votes; Miko Bergbom (PS), 10,525 votes; Anna-Kaisa Ikonen (Kok), 11,428 votes; Aleksi Jäntti (Kok), 4,157 votes; Pauli Kiuru (Kok), 10,982 votes; Anna Kontula (Vas), 4,909 votes; Lauri Lyly (SDP), 4,533 votes; Sanna Marin (SDP), 35,628 votes; Ville Merinen (SDP), 6,274 votes; Veijo Niemi (PS), 3,135 votes; Ilmari Nurminen (SDP), 4,781 votes; Jouni Ovaska (Kesk), 6,376 votes; Sakari Puisto (PS), 6,592 votes; Arto Satonen (Kok), 6,029 votes; Sami Savio (PS), 6,012 votes; Sari Tanus (KD), 6,117 votes; Oras Tynkkynen (Vihr), 5,401 votes; Joakim Vigelius (PS), 10,113 votes; Pia Viitanen (SDP), 4,112 votes; and Sofia Vikman (Kok), 7,548 votes.

==== 2010s ====
===== 2019 =====
Results of the 2019 parliamentary election held on 14 April 2019:

Party		Party			Electoral Alliance		
Party		Votes	%	Seats	Votes	%	Seats
Social Democratic Party of Finland	SDP	66,109	22.10%	5	66,109	22.10%	5
National Coalition Party	Kok	55,244	18.47%	4	55,244	18.47%	4
Finns Party	PS	51,819	17.32%	4	51,819	17.32%	4
Green League	Vihr	37,152	12.42%	2	37,152	12.42%	2
Centre Party	Kesk	26,536	8.87%	2	26,536	8.87%	2
Left Alliance	Vas	24,341	8.14%	1	24,341	8.14%	1
Christian Democrats	KD	17,180	5.74%	1	17,180	5.74%	1
Movement Now	Liik	7,178	2.40%	0	7,178	2.40%	0
Blue Reform	SIN	3,342	1.12%	0	3,342	1.12%	0
Citizens' Party	KP	2,964	0.99%	0	3,192	1.07%	0
Finnish People First	SKE	228	0.08%	0	3,192	1.07%	0
Pirate Party	Pir	2,018	0.67%	0	2,721	0.91%	0
Liberal Party – Freedom to Choose	Lib	703	0.23%	0	2,721	0.91%	0
Communist Party of Finland	SKP	728	0.24%	0	1,929	0.64%	0
Animal Justice Party of Finland	EOP	604	0.20%	0	1,929	0.64%	0
Feminist Party	FP	597	0.20%	0	1,929	0.64%	0
Seven Star Movement	TL	1,371	0.46%	0	1,371	0.46%	0
Independence Party	IPU	621	0.21%	0	621	0.21%	0
Swedish People's Party of Finland	SFP	327	0.11%	0	327	0.11%	0
Communist Workers' Party – For Peace and Socialism	KTP	92	0.03%	0	92	0.03%	0
Valid votes		299,154	100.00%	19	299,154	100.00%	19
Rejected votes		1,351	0.45%				
Total polled		300,505	71.31%				
Registered electors		421,389					

The following candidates were elected: Marko Asell (SDP), 7,353 votes; Jukka Gustafsson (SDP), 4,814 votes; Satu Hassi (Vihr), 4,835 votes; Anna-Kaisa Ikonen (Kok), 9,101 votes; Pauli Kiuru (Kok), 6,295 votes; Anna Kontula (Vas), 6,946 votes; Sanna Marin (SDP), 19,088 votes; Veijo Niemi (PS), 3,709 votes; Ilmari Nurminen (SDP), 9,712 votes; Jouni Ovaska (Kesk), 5,360 votes; Arto Pirttilahti (Kesk), 5,506 votes; Sakari Puisto (PS), 4,837 votes; Arto Satonen (Kok), 5,126 votes; Sami Savio (PS), 11,112 votes; Iiris Suomela (Vihr), 4,873 votes; Sari Tanus (KD), 6,476 votes; Veikko Vallin (PS), 4,567 votes; Pia Viitanen (SDP), 8,496 votes; and Sofia Vikman (Kok), 7,406 votes.

===== 2015 =====
Results of the 2015 parliamentary election held on 19 April 2015:

Party		Party			Electoral Alliance		
Party		Votes	%	Seats	Votes	%	Seats
National Coalition Party	Kok	54,648	19.65%	4	54,648	19.65%	4
Social Democratic Party of Finland	SDP	54,220	19.50%	4	54,220	19.50%	4
True Finns	PS	49,551	17.82%	4	49,551	17.82%	4
Centre Party	Kesk	46,189	16.61%	3	46,189	16.61%	3
Green League	Vihr	28,537	10.26%	2	28,537	10.26%	2
Left Alliance	Vas	21,780	7.83%	1	21,780	7.83%	1
Christian Democrats	KD	13,553	4.87%	1	13,553	4.87%	1
Pirate Party	Pir	3,037	1.09%	0	3,037	1.09%	0
Pirkanmaa Joint List		2,469	0.89%	0	2,469	0.89%	0
Independence Party	IPU	2,289	0.82%	0	2,289	0.82%	0
Communist Party of Finland	SKP	1,130	0.41%	0	1,191	0.43%	0
Workers' Party of Finland	STP	61	0.02%	0	1,191	0.43%	0
Change 2011		486	0.17%	0	486	0.17%	0
Communist Workers' Party – For Peace and Socialism	KTP	123	0.04%	0	123	0.04%	0
Valid votes		278,073	100.00%	19	278,073	100.00%	19
Rejected votes		1,282	0.46%				
Total polled		279,355	68.17%				
Registered electors		409,815					

The following candidates were elected: Mikko Alatalo (Kesk), 6,759 votes; Tiina Elovaara (PS), 4,107 votes; Jukka Gustafsson (SDP), 6,792 votes; Pertti Hakanen (Kesk), 4,709 votes; Satu Hassi (Vihr), 6,332 votes; Harri Jaskari (Kok), 5,471 votes; Pauli Kiuru (Kok), 5,726 votes; Anna Kontula (Vas), 7,769 votes; Lea Mäkipää (PS), 6,124 votes; Sanna Marin (SDP), 10,911 votes; Martti Mölsä (PS), 5,048 votes; Ilmari Nurminen (SDP), 5,079 votes; Olli-Poika Parviainen (Vihr), 4,437 votes; Arto Pirttilahti (Kesk), 6,629 votes; Arto Satonen (Kok), 5,339 votes; Sami Savio (PS), 5,270 votes; Sari Tanus (KD), 2,592 votes; Pia Viitanen (SDP), 8,472 votes; and Sofia Vikman (Kok), 9,473 votes.

===== 2011 =====
Results of the 2011 parliamentary election held on 17 April 2011:

Party		Party			Electoral Alliance		
Party		Votes	%	Seats	Votes	%	Seats
National Coalition Party	Kok	61,034	22.28%	5	61,034	22.28%	5
Social Democratic Party of Finland	SDP	59,201	21.61%	4	59,201	21.61%	4
True Finns	PS	57,844	21.12%	4	57,844	21.12%	4
Centre Party	Kesk	28,597	10.44%	2	28,597	10.44%	2
Left Alliance	Vas	22,817	8.33%	1	22,817	8.33%	1
Green League	Vihr	22,672	8.28%	1	22,672	8.28%	1
Christian Democrats	KD	13,605	4.97%	1	13,605	4.97%	1
Pirate Party	Pir	2,539	0.93%	0	3,229	1.18%	0
Change 2011		690	0.25%	0	3,229	1.18%	0
Communist Party of Finland	SKP	2,013	0.73%	0	2,107	0.77%	0
Workers' Party of Finland	STP	94	0.03%	0	2,107	0.77%	0
Freedom Party – Finland's Future	VP	1,517	0.55%	0	1,517	0.55%	0
Senior Citizens' Party		1,006	0.37%	0	1,006	0.37%	0
Independence Party	IPU	188	0.07%	0	188	0.07%	0
Communist Workers' Party – For Peace and Socialism	KTP	103	0.04%	0	103	0.04%	0
Valid votes		273,920	100.00%	18	273,920	100.00%	18
Rejected votes		1,318	0.48%				
Total polled		275,238	69.30%				
Registered electors		397,186					

The following candidates were elected: Mikko Alatalo (Kesk), 4,140 votes; Jukka Gustafsson (SDP), 6,793 votes; Harri Jaskari (Kok), 4,556 votes; Saara Karhu (SDP), 8,327 votes; Pauli Kiuru (Kok), 5,340 votes; Anna Kontula (Vas), 4,262 votes; Laila Koskela (PS), 9,172 votes; Lea Mäkipää (PS), 9,034 votes; Martti Mölsä (PS), 4,423 votes; Arto Pirttilahti (Kesk), 5,516 votes; Leena Rauhala (KD), 3,511 votes; Kimmo Sasi (Kok), 6,164 votes; Arto Satonen (Kok), 7,021 votes; Hanna Tainio (SDP), 10,400 votes; Oras Tynkkynen (Vihr), 7,406 votes; Pia Viitanen (SDP), 7,730 votes; Sofia Vikman (Kok), 8,279 votes; and Veltto Virtanen (PS), 6,526 votes.

==== 2000s ====
===== 2007 =====
Results of the 2007 parliamentary election held on 18 March 2007:

Party		Party			Electoral Alliance		
Party		Votes	%	Seats	Votes	%	Seats
National Coalition Party	Kok	63,399	25.11%	5	63,399	25.11%	5
Social Democratic Party of Finland	SDP	60,160	23.83%	5	60,160	23.83%	5
Centre Party	Kesk	41,126	16.29%	3	41,126	16.29%	3
Left Alliance	Vas	24,304	9.63%	2	24,304	9.63%	2
Green League	Vihr	22,056	8.74%	1	22,056	8.74%	1
Christian Democrats	KD	15,681	6.21%	1	15,681	6.21%	1
True Finns	PS	12,378	4.90%	1	12,683	5.02%	1
Independence Party	IPU	305	0.12%	0	12,683	5.02%	1
Pensioners for People		7,812	3.09%	0	7,812	3.09%	0
Communist Party of Finland	SKP	3,805	1.51%	0	3,805	1.51%	0
Liberals	Lib	847	0.34%	0	847	0.34%	0
Patriotic People's Movement	IKL	279	0.11%	0	279	0.11%	0
Finnish People's Blue-Whites	SKS	144	0.06%	0	144	0.06%	0
Communist Workers' Party – For Peace and Socialism	KTP	87	0.03%	0	87	0.03%	0
Workers' Party of Finland	STP	85	0.03%	0	85	0.03%	0
Valid votes		252,468	100.00%	18	252,468	100.00%	18
Rejected votes		1,664	0.65%				
Total polled		254,132	66.24%				
Registered electors		383,679					

The following candidates were elected: Mikko Alatalo (Kesk), 5,646 votes; Marko Asell (SDP), 4,590 votes; Jukka Gustafsson (SDP), 7,057 votes; Harri Jaskari (Kok), 4,812 votes; Saara Karhu (SDP), 11,477 votes; Mikko Kuoppa (Vas), 5,324 votes; Heikki A. Ollila (Kok), 3,869 votes; Klaus Pentti (Kesk), 4,565 votes; Leena Rauhala (KD), 4,197 votes; Tero Rönni (SDP), 4,665 votes; Pertti Salovaara (Kesk), 6,350 votes; Kimmo Sasi (Kok), 6,505 votes; Arto Satonen (Kok), 6,678 votes; Minna Sirnö (Vas), 5,093 votes; Marja Tiura (Kok), 17,578 votes; Oras Tynkkynen (Vihr), 7,930 votes; Pia Viitanen (SDP), 9,752 votes; and Veltto Virtanen (PS), 4,124 votes.

===== 2003 =====
Results of the 2003 parliamentary election held on 16 March 2003:

Party		Party			Electoral Alliance		
Party		Votes	%	Seats	Votes	%	Seats
Social Democratic Party of Finland	SDP	63,382	25.64%	5	63,382	25.64%	5
National Coalition Party	Kok	56,443	22.83%	5	56,443	22.83%	5
Centre Party	Kesk	40,957	16.57%	3	40,957	16.57%	3
Left Alliance	Vas	30,979	12.53%	2	30,979	12.53%	2
Green League	Vihr	24,050	9.73%	2	24,050	9.73%	2
Christian Democrats	KD	14,991	6.06%	1	14,991	6.06%	1
Kirjava ”Puolue” – Elonkehän Puolesta	KIPU	6,265	2.53%	0	8,132	3.29%	0
True Finns	PS	1,220	0.49%	0	8,132	3.29%	0
Liberals	Lib	597	0.24%	0	8,132	3.29%	0
Joint Responsibility Party		50	0.02%	0	8,132	3.29%	0
Communist Party of Finland	SKP	5,430	2.20%	0	5,430	2.20%	0
Pensioners for People		1,130	0.46%	0	1,130	0.46%	0
Forces for Change in Finland		1,070	0.43%	0	1,070	0.43%	0
Finnish People's Blue-Whites	SKS	384	0.16%	0	384	0.16%	0
Finland Rises – People Unites		172	0.07%	0	172	0.07%	0
Communist Workers' Party – For Peace and Socialism	KTP	109	0.04%	0	109	0.04%	0
Valid votes		247,229	100.00%	18	247,229	100.00%	18
Rejected votes		1,968	0.79%				
Total polled		249,197	67.64%				
Registered electors		368,420					

The following candidates were elected: Mikko Alatalo (Kesk), 4,858 votes; Jukka Gustafsson (SDP), 8,498 votes; Satu Hassi (Vihr), 8,781 votes; Saara Karhu (SDP), 14,281 votes; Mikko Kuoppa (Vas), 6,286 votes; Rosa Meriläinen (Vihr), 5,050 votes; Reino Ojala (SDP), 4,929 votes; Heikki A. Ollila (Kok), 3,825 votes; Klaus Pentti (Kesk), 5,299 votes; Leena Rauhala (KD), 5,250 votes; Tero Rönni (SDP), 5,936 votes; Kimmo Sasi (Kok), 9,718 votes; Arto Satonen (Kok), 4,024 votes; Minna Sirnö (Vas), 5,076 votes; Marja Tiura (Kok), 10,686 votes; Irja Tulonen (Kok), 5,781 votes; Pia Viitanen (SDP), 8,828 votes; and Jaana Ylä-Mononen (Kesk), 6,866 votes.

==== 1990s ====
===== 1999 =====
Results of the 1999 parliamentary election held on 21 March 1999:

Party		Party			Electoral Alliance		
Party		Votes	%	Seats	Votes	%	Seats
National Coalition Party	Kok	53,476	24.09%	5	55,253	24.89%	5
Liberal People's Party	LKP	1,777	0.80%	0	55,253	24.89%	5
Social Democratic Party of Finland	SDP	52,750	23.76%	4	52,750	23.76%	4
Left Alliance	Vas	35,555	16.02%	3	35,555	16.02%	3
Centre Party	Kesk	32,635	14.70%	2	32,635	14.70%	2
Green League	Vihr	15,545	7.00%	1	15,545	7.00%	1
Finnish Christian League	SKL	10,103	4.55%	1	12,952	5.83%	1
Reform Group	Rem	1,996	0.90%	0	12,952	5.83%	1
Alliance for Free Finland	VSL	853	0.38%	0	12,952	5.83%	1
Kirjava ”Puolue” – Elonkehän Puolesta	KIPU	7,508	3.38%	0	9,549	4.30%	0
True Finns	PS	1,320	0.59%	0	9,549	4.30%	0
Pensioners for People	EKA	721	0.32%	0	9,549	4.30%	0
Young Finns	Nuors	3,127	1.41%	0	3,127	1.41%	0
Communist Party of Finland	SKP	2,845	1.28%	0	2,845	1.28%	0
Pensioners' Party	SEP	833	0.38%	0	833	0.38%	0
Finland: Non-EU Joint List		338	0.15%	0	338	0.15%	0
Natural Law Party	LLP	330	0.15%	0	330	0.15%	0
Mika Ruokonen (Independent)		154	0.07%	0	154	0.07%	0
Communist Workers' Party – For Peace and Socialism	KTP	102	0.05%	0	102	0.05%	0
Juha Suikki (Independent)		23	0.01%	0	23	0.01%	0
Valid votes		221,991	100.00%	16	221,991	100.00%	16
Rejected votes		2,314	1.03%				
Total polled		224,305	66.69%				
Registered electors		336,355					

The following candidates were elected: Sulo Aittoniemi (Kesk), 12,264 votes; Jukka Gustafsson (SDP), 8,987 votes; Satu Hassi (Vihr), 7,150 votes; Kari Kantalainen (Kok), 5,437 votes; Saara Karhu (SDP), 8,175 votes; Kalervo Kummola (Kok), 5,260 votes; Mikko Kuoppa (Vas), 5,618 votes; Leena Rauhala (SKL), 6,319 votes; Tero Rönni (SDP), 4,717 votes; Kimmo Sasi (Kok), 11,378 votes; Marjatta Stenius-Kaukonen (Vas), 13,429 votes; Marja Tiura (Kok), 5,289 votes; Irja Tulonen (Kok), 5,049 votes; Pertti Turtiainen (Vas), 3,570 votes; Pia Viitanen (SDP), 5,757 votes; and Jaana Ylä-Mononen (Kesk), 4,678 votes.

===== 1995 =====
Results of the 1995 parliamentary election held on 19 March 1995:

Party		Party			Electoral Alliance		
Party		Votes	%	Seats	Votes	%	Seats
Social Democratic Party of Finland	SDP	69,153	30.48%	6	69,153	30.48%	6
National Coalition Party	Kok	46,184	20.35%	4	46,184	20.35%	4
Centre Party	Kesk	30,034	13.24%	2	33,376	14.71%	2
Liberal People's Party	LKP	3,342	1.47%	0	33,376	14.71%	2
Left Alliance	Vas	31,981	14.09%	2	31,981	14.09%	2
Ecological Party the Greens	EKO	6,510	2.87%	1	17,224	7.59%	1
Finnish Christian League	SKL	5,826	2.57%	0	17,224	7.59%	1
Finnish Rural Party	SMP	3,139	1.38%	0	17,224	7.59%	1
Pensioners for People	ELKA	1,399	0.62%	0	17,224	7.59%	1
Women's Party	NAISP	350	0.15%	0	17,224	7.59%	1
Green League	Vihr	15,353	6.77%	1	15,353	6.77%	1
Young Finns	Nuor	5,662	2.50%	0	5,662	2.50%	0
Other Joint List		3,057	1.35%	0	3,057	1.35%	0
Alliance for Free Finland	VSL	2,195	0.97%	0	2,195	0.97%	0
Pensioners' Party	SEP	948	0.42%	0	948	0.42%	0
Natural Law Party	LLP	846	0.37%	0	846	0.37%	0
Communist Workers' Party – For Peace and Socialism	KTP	735	0.32%	0	735	0.32%	0
Seppo Lehto (Independent)		100	0.04%	0	100	0.04%	0
Joint Responsibility Party	YYP	55	0.02%	0	55	0.02%	0
Leo M. Nieminen (Independent)		40	0.02%	0	40	0.02%	0
Valid votes		226,909	100.00%	16	226,909	100.00%	16
Rejected votes		1,873	0.82%				
Total polled		228,782	70.24%				
Registered electors		325,702					

The following candidates were elected: Sulo Aittoniemi (Kesk), 9,643 votes; Jukka Gustafsson (SDP), 9,709 votes; Satu Hassi (Vihr), 6,354 votes; Kari Kantalainen (Kok), 4,687 votes; Mikko Kuoppa (Vas), 5,615 votes; Reijo Lindroos (SDP), 9,985 votes; Arja Ojala (SDP), 8,008 votes; Reino Ojala (SDP), 6,822 votes; Jorma Rantanen (SDP), 4,926 votes; Eila Rimmi (Vas), 5,413 votes; Kimmo Sasi (Kok), 5,199 votes; Anneli Taina (Kok), 7,229 votes; Irja Tulonen (Kok), 6,271 votes; Pia Viitanen (SDP), 4,862 votes; Veltto Virtanen (EKO), 6,427 votes; and Markku Vuorensola (Kesk), 4,366 votes.

===== 1991 =====
Results of the 1991 parliamentary election held on 17 March 1991:

Party		Party			Electoral Alliance		
Party		Votes	%	Seats	Votes	%	Seats
Social Democratic Party of Finland	SDP	50,487	25.19%	4	50,487	25.19%	4
National Coalition Party	Kok	50,433	25.17%	4	50,433	25.17%	4
Finnish Rural Party	SMP	21,277	10.62%	1	29,144	14.54%	2
Finnish Christian League	SKL	5,758	2.87%	1	29,144	14.54%	2
Liberal People's Party	LKP	2,109	1.05%	0	29,144	14.54%	2
Left Alliance	Vas	29,050	14.50%	2	29,050	14.50%	2
Centre Party	Kesk	22,885	11.42%	2	22,885	11.42%	2
Green League	Vihr	15,067	7.52%	1	15,067	7.52%	1
Pensioners' Party	SEP	590	0.29%	0	1,062	0.53%	0
The Greens	EKO	472	0.24%	0	1,062	0.53%	0
Women's Party	NAISL	956	0.48%	0	956	0.48%	0
Independent Non-Aligned Pensioners	ELKA	721	0.36%	0	721	0.36%	0
Communist Workers' Party – For Peace and Socialism	KTP	317	0.16%	0	476	0.24%	0
Joint Responsibility Party	YYP	159	0.08%	0	476	0.24%	0
Humanity Party		115	0.06%	0	115	0.06%	0
Valid votes		200,396	100.00%	15	200,396	100.00%	15
Blank votes		3,154	1.54%				
Rejected Votess – Other		1,186	0.58%				
Total polled		204,736	69.13%				
Registered electors		296,173					

The following candidates were elected: Sulo Aittoniemi (SMP), 18,744 votes; Jukka Gustafsson (SDP), 6,218 votes; Satu Hassi (Vihr), 5,284 votes; Pentti Lahti-Nuuttila (SDP), 6,317 votes; Vesa Laukkanen (SKL), 5,160 votes; Reijo Lindroos (SDP), 6,922 votes; Helmi Morri (Kesk), 3,047 votes; Arja Ojala (SDP), 5,871 votes; Heikki A. Ollila (Kok), 5,117 votes; Eila Rimmi (Vas), 4,347 votes; Kimmo Sasi (Kok), 5,762 votes; Marjatta Stenius-Kaukonen (Vas), 9,410 votes; Anneli Taina (Kok), 8,049 votes; Irmeli Takala (Kok), 4,899 votes; and Markku Vuorensola (Kesk), 3,415 votes.

==== 1980s ====
===== 1987 =====
Results of the 1987 parliamentary election held on 15 and 16 March 1987:

Party		Party			Electoral Alliance		
Party		Votes	%	Seats	Votes	%	Seats
National Coalition Party	Kok	56,906	29.94%	5	56,906	29.94%	5
Social Democratic Party of Finland	SDP	52,042	27.39%	4	52,042	27.39%	4
Democratic Alternative	DEVA	17,912	9.43%	1	17,912	9.43%	1
Finnish People's Democratic League	SKDL	17,621	9.27%	1	17,621	9.27%	1
Centre Party	Kesk	12,650	6.66%	1	15,671	8.25%	1
Liberal People's Party	LKP	3,021	1.59%	0	15,671	8.25%	1
Finnish Rural Party	SMP	13,474	7.09%	1	13,474	7.09%	1
Green League	Vihr	8,702	4.58%	0	8,702	4.58%	0
Finnish Christian League	SKL	4,976	2.62%	0	4,976	2.62%	0
Pensioners' Party	SEP	2,733	1.44%	0	2,733	1.44%	0
Valid votes		190,037	100.00%	13	190,037	100.00%	13
Rejected votes		1,026	0.54%				
Total polled		191,063	73.51%				
Registered electors		259,919					

The following candidates were elected: Sulo Aittoniemi (SMP), 7,698 votes; Jukka Gustafsson (SDP), 6,170 votes; Matti Hokkanen (Kok), 5,755 votes; Riitta Järvisalo-Kanerva (SDP), 5,109 votes; Pentti Lahti-Nuuttila (SDP), 7,050 votes; Pertti Lahtinen (SKDL), 4,173 votes; Reijo Lindroos (SDP), 10,109 votes; Matti Maijala (Kesk), 4,296 votes; Heikki A. Ollila (Kok), 7,256 votes; Erkki Pystynen (Kok), 6,200 votes; Kimmo Sasi (Kok), 9,105 votes; Marjatta Stenius-Kaukonen (DA), 7,367 votes; and Anneli Taina (Kok), 8,725 votes.

===== 1983 =====
Results of the 1983 parliamentary election held on 20 and 21 March 1983:

Party		Party			Electoral Alliance		
Party		Votes	%	Seats	Votes	%	Seats
Social Democratic Party of Finland	SDP	57,596	29.47%	4	57,596	29.47%	4
National Coalition Party	Kok	54,373	27.82%	4	54,373	27.82%	4
Finnish People's Democratic League	SKDL	38,807	19.85%	3	38,807	19.85%	3
Finnish Rural Party	SMP	16,775	8.58%	1	16,775	8.58%	1
Centre Party and Liberal People's Party	Kesk-LKP	14,849	7.60%	1	14,849	7.60%	1
Finnish Christian League	SKL	9,721	4.97%	0	9,881	5.06%	0
Union for Democracy	KVL	160	0.08%	0	9,881	5.06%	0
Joint List A (Green League)		2,624	1.34%	0	2,624	1.34%	0
Harri Strömberg (Independent)		552	0.28%	0	552	0.28%	0
Valid votes		195,457	100.00%	13	195,457	100.00%	13
Rejected votes		901	0.46%				
Total polled		196,358	77.23%				
Registered electors		254,259					

The following candidates were elected: Sampsa Aaltio (Kok), 5,935 votes; Ulla-Leena Alppi (SKDL), 12,375 votes; Vieno Eklund (SMP), 4,737 votes; Riitta Järvisalo-Kanerva (SDP), 7,867 votes; Mikko Kuoppa (SKDL), 7,373 votes; Pentti Lahti-Nuuttila (SDP), 7,344 votes; Jermu Laine (SDP), 6,873 votes; Reijo Lindroos (SDP), 11,231 votes; Matti Maijala (Kesk-LKP), 4,386 votes; Tuulikki Petäjäniemi (Kok), 10,973 votes; Erkki Pystynen (Kok), 6,388 votes; Kimmo Sasi (Kok), 6,480 votes; and Marjatta Stenius-Kaukonen (SKDL), 7,727 votes.

==== 1970s ====
===== 1979 =====
Results of the 1979 parliamentary election held on 18 and 19 March 1979:

Party		Party			Electoral Alliance		
Party		Votes	%	Seats	Votes	%	Seats
National Coalition Party	Kok	54,389	28.39%	4	54,389	28.39%	4
Social Democratic Party of Finland	SDP	51,617	26.95%	4	51,617	26.95%	4
Finnish People's Democratic League	SKDL	46,280	24.16%	3	47,068	24.57%	3
Socialist Workers Party	STP	788	0.41%	0	47,068	24.57%	3
Finnish Christian League	SKL	9,567	4.99%	1	23,345	12.19%	1
Finnish Rural Party	SMP	6,653	3.47%	0	23,345	12.19%	1
Liberal People's Party	LKP	5,651	2.95%	0	23,345	12.19%	1
Constitutional People's Party	PKP	1,474	0.77%	0	23,345	12.19%	1
Centre Party	Kesk	14,907	7.78%	1	14,907	7.78%	1
Finnish People's Unity Party	SKYP	226	0.12%	0	226	0.12%	0
Valid votes		191,552	100.00%	13	191,552	100.00%	13
Rejected votes		786	0.41%				
Total polled		192,338	77.69%				
Registered electors		247,580					

The following candidates were elected: Sampsa Aaltio (Kok), 6,148 votes; Ulla-Leena Alppi (SKDL), 13,936 votes; Matti Hokkanen (Kok), 9,834 votes; Antero Juntumaa (SKL), 7,497 votes; Tellervo M. Koivisto (SDP), 9,869 votes; Mikko Kuoppa (SKDL), 6,786 votes; Pentti Lahti-Nuuttila (SDP), 6,276 votes; Jermu Laine (SDP), 6,591 votes; Eino Loikkanen (SDP), 6,402 votes; Matti Maijala (Kesk), 4,457 votes; Marjatta Mattsson (SKDL), 11,082 votes; Tuulikki Petäjäniemi (Kok), 9,883 votes; and Erkki Pystynen (Kok), 6,968 votes.

===== 1975 =====
Results of the 1975 parliamentary election held on 21 and 22 September 1975:

Party		Party			Electoral Alliance		
Party		Votes	%	Seats	Votes	%	Seats
National Coalition Party	Kok	44,283	24.20%	3	52,726	28.81%	4
Finnish Christian League	SKL	6,857	3.75%	1	52,726	28.81%	4
Finnish People's Unity Party	SKYP	1,586	0.87%	0	52,726	28.81%	4
Social Democratic Party of Finland	SDP	52,613	28.75%	4	52,613	28.75%	4
Finnish People's Democratic League	SKDL	46,832	25.59%	4	47,672	26.05%	4
Socialist Workers Party	STP	840	0.46%	0	47,672	26.05%	4
Centre Party	Kesk	15,760	8.61%	1	15,760	8.61%	1
Liberal People's Party	LKP	7,642	4.18%	0	7,642	4.18%	0
Finnish Rural Party	SMP	3,725	2.04%	0	6,586	3.60%	0
Finnish Constitutional People's Party	SPK	2,102	1.15%	0	6,586	3.60%	0
Party of Finnish Entrepreneurs	SYP	759	0.41%	0	6,586	3.60%	0
Valid votes		182,999	100.00%	13	182,999	100.00%	13
Rejected votes		699	0.38%				
Total polled		183,698	76.55%				
Registered electors		239,974					

The following candidates were elected: Mikko Asunta (Kok), 5,740 votes; Matti Hokkanen (Kok), 8,675 votes; Kuuno Honkonen (SKDL), 8,012 votes; Riitta Järvisalo-Kanerva (SDP), 8,455 votes; Antero Juntumaa (SKL), 6,270 votes; Tellervo M. Koivisto (SDP), 8,050 votes; Jermu Laine (SDP), 9,075 votes; Eino Loikkanen (SDP), 5,499 votes; Matti Maijala (Kesk), 4,500 votes; Erkki Pystynen (Kok), 8,436 votes; Heimo Rekonen (SKDL), 9,250 votes; Marjatta Stenius (SKDL), 13,757 votes; and Kaisu Weckman (SKDL), 6,909 votes.

===== 1972 =====
Results of the 1972 parliamentary election held on 2 and 3 January 1972:

Party		Party			Electoral Alliance		
Party		Votes	%	Seats	Votes	%	Seats
Social Democratic Party of Finland	SDP	52,945	31.17%	5	52,945	31.17%	5
National Coalition Party	Kok	41,920	24.68%	3	41,920	24.68%	3
Finnish People's Democratic League	SKDL	36,013	21.20%	3	39,497	23.26%	3
Social Democratic Union of Workers and Smallholders	TPSL	3,484	2.05%	0	39,497	23.26%	3
Centre Party	Kesk	13,359	7.87%	0	19,922	11.73%	1
Liberal People's Party	LKP	6,563	3.86%	1	19,922	11.73%	1
Finnish Rural Party	SMP	10,915	6.43%	0	15,552	9.16%	1
Finnish Christian League	SKL	4,637	2.73%	1	15,552	9.16%	1
Valid votes		169,836	100.00%	13	169,836	100.00%	13
Rejected votes		679	0.40%				
Total polled		170,515	80.96%				
Registered electors		210,628					

The following candidates were elected: Mikko Asunta (Kok), 5,289 votes; Olavi Borg (LKP), 4,920 votes; Anni Flinck (SDP), 5,506 votes; Matti Hokkanen (Kok), 5,290 votes; Kuuno Honkonen (SKDL), 8,910 votes; Riitta Järvisalo-Kanerva (SDP), 5,250 votes; Antero Juntumaa (SKL), 4,193 votes; Tellervo M. Koivisto (SDP), 11,003 votes; Eino Loikkanen (SDP), 7,003 votes; Heimo Rekonen (SKDL), 8,761 votes; Valdemar Sandelin (SDP), 7,053 votes; Sami Suominen (Kok), 7,755 votes; and Kaisu Weckman (SKDL), 8,538 votes.

===== 1970 =====
Results of the 1970 parliamentary election held on 15 and 16 March 1970:

Party		Party			Electoral Alliance		
Party		Votes	%	Seats	Votes	%	Seats
Social Democratic Party of Finland	SDP	48,459	28.89%	4	48,459	28.89%	4
National Coalition Party	Kok	43,724	26.07%	4	43,724	26.07%	4
Finnish People's Democratic League	SKDL	35,227	21.00%	3	35,227	21.00%	3
Centre Party	Kesk	15,620	9.31%	1	15,620	9.31%	1
Finnish Rural Party	SMP	12,083	7.20%	1	12,083	7.20%	1
Liberal People's Party	LKP	8,690	5.18%	0	9,970	5.94%	0
Finnish Christian League	SKL	1,280	0.76%	0	9,970	5.94%	0
Social Democratic Union of Workers and Smallholders	TPSL	2,625	1.57%	0	2,625	1.57%	0
Valid votes		167,708	100.00%	13	167,708	100.00%	13
Rejected votes		564	0.34%				
Total polled		168,272	82.56%				
Registered electors		203,807					

The following candidates were elected: Anni Flinck (SDP), 5,581 votes; Pekka Haarla (Kok), 4,798 votes; Kuuno Honkonen (SKDL), 6,104 votes; Orvokki Kauppila (Kok), 4,776 votes; Tellervo M. Koivisto (SDP), 6,952 votes; Eino Loikkanen (SDP), 7,428 votes; Matti Maijala (Kesk), 2,842 votes; Heimo Rekonen (SKDL), 5,134 votes; Valdemar Sandelin (SDP), 5,466 votes; Eeva Särkkä (Kok), 5,831 votes; Sami Suominen (Kok), 11,110 votes; Eino Syrjä (SMP), 1,625 votes; and Kaisu Weckman (SKDL), 7,186 votes.

==== 1960s ====
===== 1966 =====
Results of the 1966 parliamentary election held on 20 and 21 March 1966:

Party		Party			Electoral Alliance		
Party		Votes	%	Seats	Votes	%	Seats
Social Democratic Party of Finland	SDP	50,738	33.91%	4	50,738	33.91%	4
Finnish People's Democratic League	SKDL	39,334	26.28%	4	43,756	29.24%	4
Social Democratic Union of Workers and Smallholders	TPSL	4,422	2.95%	0	43,756	29.24%	4
National Coalition Party	Kok	32,827	21.94%	3	32,827	21.94%	3
Centre Party	Kesk	14,730	9.84%	1	14,730	9.84%	1
Liberal People's Party	LKP	7,197	4.81%	0	7,589	5.07%	0
Smallholders' Party of Finland	SPP	392	0.26%	0	7,589	5.07%	0
Write-in lists		7	0.00%	0	7	0.00%	0
Valid votes		149,647	100.00%	12	149,647	100.00%	12
Blank votes		73	0.05%				
Rejected Votess – Other		566	0.38%				
Total polled		150,286	85.68%				
Registered electors		175,406					

The following candidates were elected: Mikko Asunta (Kok), 4,331 votes; Anni Flinck (SDP), 8,906 votes; Pekka Haarla (Kok), 6,643 votes; Antti Halme (SDP), 6,173 votes; Toivo Hietala (Kok), 6,330 votes; Kuuno Honkonen (SKDL), 6,271 votes; Pekka Kuusi (SDP), 7,012 votes; Atte Pakkanen (Kesk), 4,347 votes; Valdemar Sandelin (SDP), 7,509 votes; Leo Suonpää (SKDL), 6,794 votes; Väinö Virtanen (SKDL), 6,302 votes; and Kaisu Weckman (SKDL), 8,254 votes.

===== 1962 =====
Results of the 1962 parliamentary election held on 4 and 5 February 1962:

Party		Party			Electoral Alliance		
Party		Votes	%	Seats	Votes	%	Seats
Finnish People's Democratic League	SKDL	42,172	28.90%	4	42,172	28.90%	4
Social Democratic Party of Finland	SDP	38,824	26.61%	3	38,824	26.61%	3
National Coalition Party	Kok	34,440	23.60%	3	34,440	23.60%	3
Agrarian Party	ML	17,209	11.79%	1	23,397	16.03%	2
People's Party of Finland	SK	6,188	4.24%	1	23,397	16.03%	2
Social Democratic Union of Workers and Smallholders	TPSL	5,744	3.94%	0	5,744	3.94%	0
Smallholders' Party of Finland	SPP	1,347	0.92%	0	1,347	0.92%	0
Valid votes		145,924	100.00%	12	145,924	100.00%	12
Rejected votes		503	0.34%				
Total polled		146,427	86.87%				
Registered electors		168,559					

The following candidates were elected: Kustaa Alanko (SDP), 9,310 votes; Mikko Asunta (Kok), 5,009 votes; Anni Flinck (SDP), 7,491 votes; Kuuno Honkonen (SKDL), 5,623 votes; Antti Linna (SK), 5,819 votes; Atte Pakkanen (ML), 5,103 votes; Matti Raipala (Kok), 4,540 votes; Valdemar Sandelin (SDP), 5,489 votes; Elli Stenberg (SKDL), 8,654 votes; Leo Suonpää (SKDL), 6,817 votes; Väinö Virtanen (SKDL), 5,093 votes; and Toivo Wiherheimo (Kok), 3,867 votes.

==== 1950s ====
===== 1958 =====
Results of the 1958 parliamentary election held on 6 and 7 July 1958:

Party		Votes	%	Seats
Finnish People's Democratic League	SKDL	41,631	29.84%	5
Social Democratic Party of Finland	SDP	33,082	23.72%	3
National Coalition Party	Kok	30,524	21.88%	3
Agrarian Party	ML	16,406	11.76%	1
Social Democratic Opposition	SDO	10,941	7.84%	1
People's Party of Finland	SK	6,347	4.55%	0
Free Citizens and Centre List		560	0.40%	0
Write-in lists		4	0.00%	0
Valid votes		139,495	100.00%	13
Rejected votes		729	0.52%	
Total polled		140,224	77.55%	
Registered electors		180,810		

The following candidates were elected: Kustaa Alanko (SDP), 6,125 votes; Mikko Asunta (Kok), 3,803 votes; Anni Flinck (SDP), 4,682 votes; Toivo Hietala (Kok); Kuuno Honkonen (SKDL), 4,415 votes; Atte Pakkanen (ML), 3,891 votes; Usko Seppi (SKDL), 4,445 votes; Aarre Simonen (SDO), 3,929 votes; Elli Stenberg (SKDL), 8,547 votes; Leo Suonpää (SKDL), 7,000 votes; Arvo Tuominen (SDP), 8,133 votes; Väinö Virtanen (SKDL), 3,970 votes; and Toivo Wiherheimo (Kok), 5,330 votes.

===== 1954 =====
Results of the 1954 parliamentary election held on 7 and 8 March 1954:

Party		Party			Electoral Alliance		
Party		Votes	%	Seats	Votes	%	Seats
Social Democratic Party of Finland	SDP	45,864	33.22%	5	45,864	33.22%	5
Finnish People's Democratic League	SKDL	39,189	28.39%	4	39,189	28.39%	4
National Coalition Party	Kok	25,363	18.37%	2	25,363	18.37%	2
Agrarian Party	ML	16,043	11.62%	1	16,396	11.88%	1
Small Farmers Party		353	0.26%	0	16,396	11.88%	1
People's Party of Finland	SK	11,216	8.12%	1	11,216	8.12%	1
Write-in lists		20	0.01%	0	20	0.01%	0
Valid votes		138,048	100.00%	13	138,048	100.00%	13
Rejected votes		627	0.45%				
Total polled		138,675	80.49%				
Registered electors		172,287					

The following candidates were elected: Kustaa Alanko (SDP); Anni Flinck (SDP); Jaakko Hakala (Kok); Väinö Hakkila (SDP); Kaisa Hiilelä (SDP); Lauri Myllymäki (SKDL); Atte Pakkanen (ML); Usko Seppi (SKDL); Aarre Simonen (SDP); Elli Stenberg (SKDL); Leo Suonpää (SKDL); Artturi Tienari (SK); and Toivo Wiherheimo (Kok).

===== 1951 =====
Results of the 1951 parliamentary election held on 1 and 2 July 1951:

Party		Party			Electoral Alliance		
Party		Votes	%	Seats	Votes	%	Seats
Social Democratic Party of Finland	SDP	43,966	34.72%	5	43,966	34.72%	5
Finnish People's Democratic League	SKDL	35,659	28.16%	4	35,659	28.16%	4
National Coalition Party	Kok	25,294	19.98%	3	25,541	20.17%	3
Liberal League	VL	247	0.20%	0	25,541	20.17%	3
Agrarian Party	ML	13,752	10.86%	1	13,752	10.86%	1
People's Party of Finland	SK	6,746	5.33%	0	6,746	5.33%	0
Small Farmers Party		943	0.74%	0	943	0.74%	0
Write-in lists		15	0.01%	0	15	0.01%	0
Valid votes		126,622	100.00%	13	126,622	100.00%	13
Rejected votes		866	0.68%				
Total polled		127,488	76.76%				
Registered electors		166,089					

The following candidates were elected: Kustaa Alanko (SDP); Valfrid Eskola (SDP); Jaakko Hakala (Kok); Väinö Hakkila (SDP); Matti Heikkilä (Kok); Kaisa Hiilelä (SDP); Lauri Myllymäki (SKDL); Atte Pakkanen (ML); Kalle Renfors (SKDL); Usko Seppi (SKDL); Aarre Simonen (SDP); Elli Stenberg (SKDL); and Toivo Wiherheimo (Kok).

==== 1940s ====
===== 1948 =====
Results of the 1948 parliamentary election held on 1 and 2 July 1948:

Party		Party			Electoral Alliance		
Party		Votes	%	Seats	Votes	%	Seats
Social Democratic Party of Finland	SDP	43,055	35.84%	5	43,055	35.84%	5
Finnish People's Democratic League	SKDL	33,301	27.72%	3	33,301	27.72%	3
National Coalition Party	Kok	27,204	22.64%	3	30,906	25.72%	3
National Progressive Party	KE	3,702	3.08%	0	30,906	25.72%	3
Agrarian Party	ML	11,450	9.53%	1	11,450	9.53%	1
Small Farmers Party		650	0.54%	0	650	0.54%	0
Others		785	0.65%	0	785	0.65%	0
Valid votes		120,147	100.00%	12	120,147	100.00%	12
Rejected votes		434	0.36%				
Total polled		120,581	81.55%				
Registered electors		147,859					

The following candidates were elected: Kustaa Alanko (SDP); Valfrid Eskola (SDP); Jaakko Hakala (Kok); Väinö Hakkila (SDP); Matti Heikkilä (Kok); Kaisa Hiilelä (SDP); Alpo Lumme (SDP); Lauri Myllymäki (SKDL); Atte Pakkanen (ML); Kalle Renfors (SKDL); Elli Stenberg (SKDL); and Toivo Wiherheimo (Kok).

===== 1945 =====
Results of the 1945 parliamentary election held on 17 and 18 March 1945:

Party		Party			Electoral Alliance		
Party		Votes	%	Seats	Votes	%	Seats
Social Democratic Party of Finland	SDP	38,019	33.82%	4	38,019	33.82%	4
National Coalition Party	Kok	22,195	19.74%	2	36,899	32.82%	4
Agrarian Party	ML	8,742	7.78%	1	36,899	32.82%	4
National Progressive Party	KE	5,962	5.30%	1	36,899	32.82%	4
Finnish People's Democratic League	SKDL	35,475	31.55%	3	35,475	31.55%	3
Small Farmers Party		1,564	1.39%	0	1,564	1.39%	0
Write-in lists		474	0.42%	0	474	0.42%	0
Valid votes		112,431	100.00%	11	112,431	100.00%	11
Rejected votes		825	0.73%				
Total polled		113,256	82.10%				
Registered electors		137,953					

The following candidates were elected: Valfrid Eskola (SDP); Jaakko Hakala (Kok); Matti Heikkilä (Kok); Sulo Heiniö (KE); Kaisa Hiilelä (SDP); Kalle Jutila (ML); Alpo Lumme (SDP); Lauri Myllymäki (SKDL); Elli Stenberg (SKDL); Väinö Voionmaa (SDP); and Karl Wiik (SKDL).

==== 1930s ====
===== 1939 =====
Results of the 1939 parliamentary election held on 1 and 2 July 1939:

Party		Party			Electoral Alliance		
Party		Votes	%	Seats	Votes	%	Seats
Social Democratic Party of Finland	SDP	49,684	60.40%	8	49,684	60.40%	8
National Coalition Party	Kok	14,769	17.95%	2	14,769	17.95%	2
National Progressive Party	KE	5,965	7.25%	1	11,449	13.92%	1
Agrarian Party	ML	5,484	6.67%	0	11,449	13.92%	1
Patriotic People's Movement	IKL	5,534	6.73%	0	5,534	6.73%	0
Party of Smallholders and Rural People	PMP	704	0.86%	0	704	0.86%	0
Write-in lists		125	0.15%	0	125	0.15%	0
Valid votes		82,265	100.00%	11	82,265	100.00%	11
Rejected votes		349	0.42%				
Total polled		82,614	71.11%				
Registered electors		116,179					

The following candidates were elected: Hugo Aattela (SDP); Valfrid Eskola (SDP); Väinö Hakkila (SDP); Matti Heikkilä (Kok); Sulo Heiniö (KE); Kaisa Hiilelä (SDP); Toivo Horelli (Kok); Olavi Kajala (SDP); Edvard Kujala (SDP); Alpo Lumme (SDP); and Väinö Voionmaa (SDP).

===== 1936 =====
Results of the 1936 parliamentary election held on 1 and 2 July 1936:

Party		Votes	%	Seats
Social Democratic Party of Finland	SDP	45,056	60.47%	8
National Coalition Party	Kok	11,198	15.03%	2
Patriotic People's Movement	IKL	6,134	8.23%	1
National Progressive Party	KE	5,479	7.35%	0
Agrarian Party	ML	5,425	7.28%	0
Small Farmers' Party of Finland	SPP	1,002	1.34%	0
Write-in lists		212	0.28%	0
Valid votes		74,506	100.00%	11
Rejected votes		334	0.45%	
Total polled		74,840	69.12%	
Registered electors		108,281		

The following candidates were elected: Hugo Aattela (SDP); Leo Böök (Kok); Valfrid Eskola (SDP); Väinö Hakkila (SDP); Kaarlo Harvala (SDP); Kaisa Hildén (SDP); Toivo Horelli (Kok); Edvard Kujala (SDP); Alpo Lumme (SDP); Pauli Tuorila (IKL); and Väinö Voionmaa (SDP).

===== 1933 =====
Results of the 1933 parliamentary election held on 1, 2 and 3 July 1933:

Party		Votes	%	Seats
Social Democratic Labour Party of Finland	SDTP	43,334	59.58%	8
National Coalition Party and Patriotic People's Movement	Kok-IKL	15,515	21.33%	2
National Progressive Party	KE	6,157	8.47%	1
Agrarian Party	ML	5,272	7.25%	0
Small Farmers' Party of Finland	SPP	2,309	3.17%	0
Write-in lists		145	0.20%	0
Valid votes		72,732	100.00%	11
Rejected votes		494	0.67%	
Total polled		73,226	71.45%	
Registered electors		102,487		

The following candidates were elected: Hugo Aattela (SDTP); Leo Böök (Kok-IKL); Valfrid Eskola (SDTP); Väinö Hakkila (SDTP); Kaarlo Harvala (SDTP); Sulo Heiniö (KE); Kaisa Hildén (SDTP); Toivo Horelli (Kok-IKL); Edvard Kujala (SDTP); Alpo Lumme (SDTP); and Väinö Voionmaa (SDTP).

===== 1930 =====
Results of the 1930 parliamentary election held on 1 and 2 October 1930:

Party		Party			Electoral Alliance		
Party		Votes	%	Seats	Votes	%	Seats
Social Democratic Labour Party of Finland	SDTP	38,380	56.04%	7	38,380	56.04%	7
National Coalition Party	Kok	17,341	25.32%	3	27,018	39.45%	4
Agrarian Party	ML	5,598	8.17%	0	27,018	39.45%	4
National Progressive Party	KE	3,252	4.75%	1	27,018	39.45%	4
Small groups of the Patriotic List		827	1.21%	0	27,018	39.45%	4
Small Farmers' Party of Finland	SPP	1,977	2.89%	0	1,977	2.89%	0
Socialist Electoral Organisation of Workers and Smallholders	STPV	962	1.40%	0	962	1.40%	0
Write-in lists		151	0.22%	0	151	0.22%	0
Valid votes		68,488	100.00%	11	68,488	100.00%	11
Rejected votes		446	0.65%				
Total polled		68,934	70.11%				
Registered electors		98,325					

The following candidates were elected: Hugo Aattela (SDTP); Valfrid Eskola (SDTP); Väinö Hakkila (SDTP); Maija Häkkinen (Kok); Kaarlo Harvala (SDTP); Kaisa Hildén (SDTP); Eino Kilpi (SDTP); Niilo Solja (Kok); Antti Tulenheimo (Kok); Walto Tuomioja (KE); and Väinö Voionmaa (SDTP).

==== 1920s ====
===== 1929 =====
Results of the 1929 parliamentary election held on 1 and 2 July 1929:

Party		Votes	%	Seats
Social Democratic Labour Party of Finland	SDTP	28,298	49.12%	6
National Coalition Party	Kok	10,911	18.94%	2
Socialist Electoral Organisation of Workers and Smallholders	STPV	6,589	11.44%	1
Agrarian Party	ML	5,653	9.81%	1
National Progressive Party	KE	4,400	7.64%	1
Small Farmers' Party of Finland	SPP	1,486	2.58%	0
Write-in lists		275	0.48%	0
Valid votes		57,612	100.00%	11
Rejected votes		542	0.93%	
Total polled		58,154	58.71%	
Registered electors		99,047		

The following candidates were elected: Valfrid Eskola (SDTP); Kyösti Haataja (Kok); Väinö Hakkila (SDTP); Maija Häkkinen (Kok); Kaarlo Harvala (SDTP); Eetu Jussila (ML); Edvard Kujala (SDTP); Eemil Linna (KE); Lauri Myllymäki (STPV); Ida Vihuri (SDTP); and Väinö Voionmaa (SDTP).

===== 1927 =====
Results of the 1927 parliamentary election held on 1 and 2 July 1927:

Party		Votes	%	Seats
Social Democratic Labour Party of Finland	SDTP	28,270	51.34%	6
National Coalition Party	Kok	12,081	21.94%	2
Socialist Electoral Organisation of Workers and Smallholders	STPV	5,154	9.36%	1
National Progressive Party	KE	5,096	9.25%	1
Agrarian Party	ML	4,321	7.85%	1
Write-in lists		143	0.26%	0
Valid votes		55,065	100.00%	11
Rejected votes		327	0.59%	
Total polled		55,392	59.12%	
Registered electors		93,696		

The following candidates were elected: Valfrid Eskola (SDTP); Väinö Hakkila (SDTP); Kaarlo Harvala (SDTP); Janne Ihamuotila (ML); Eemil Linna (KE); Lauri Myllymäki (STPV); Väinö Pastell (Kok); Yrjö Pulkkinen (Kok); Emil Saarinen (SDTP); Ida Vihuri (SDTP); and Väinö Voionmaa (SDTP).

===== 1924 =====
Results of the 1924 parliamentary election held on 1 and 2 April 1924:

Party		Party			Electoral Alliance		
Party		Votes	%	Seats	Votes	%	Seats
Social Democratic Labour Party of Finland	SDTP	28,537	52.50%	6	28,537	52.50%	6
National Coalition Party	Kok	13,190	24.26%	3	13,190	24.26%	3
National Progressive Party	KE	5,743	10.56%	1	9,538	17.55%	2
Agrarian Party	ML	3,795	6.98%	1	9,538	17.55%	2
Socialist Electoral Organisation of Workers and Smallholders	STPV	3,016	5.55%	0	3,016	5.55%	0
Write-in lists		80	0.15%	0	80	0.15%	0
Valid votes		54,361	100.00%	11	54,361	100.00%	11
Rejected votes		260	0.48%				
Total polled		54,621	61.48%				
Registered electors		88,841					

The following candidates were elected: Väinö Hakkila (SDTP); Kaarlo Harvala (SDTP); Anni Huotari (SDTP); Janne Ihamuotila (ML); Eemil Linna (KE); Johannes Peltonen (Kok); Yrjö Pulkkinen (Kok); Emil Saarinen (SDTP); Elli Tavastähti (Kok); Ida Vihuri (SDTP); and Väinö Voionmaa (SDTP).

===== 1922 =====
Results of the 1922 parliamentary election held on 1, 2 and 3 July 1922:

Party		Votes	%	Seats
Social Democratic Labour Party of Finland	SDTP	26,202	51.34%	7
National Coalition Party	Kok	12,398	24.29%	3
National Progressive Party	KE	5,559	10.89%	1
Socialist Workers' Party of Finland	SSTP	3,631	7.12%	0
Agrarian Party	ML	3,201	6.27%	0
Write-in lists		41	0.08%	0
Valid votes		51,032	100.00%	11
Rejected votes		346	0.67%	
Total polled		51,378	60.30%	
Registered electors		85,203		

The following candidates were elected: Valfrid Eskola (SDTP); Kaarlo Harvala (SDTP); Anni Huotari (SDTP); Eemil Linna (KE); Johannes Peltonen (Kok); Yrjö Pulkkinen (Kok); Hannes Ryömä (SDTP); Emil Saarinen (SDTP); Otto Thuneberg (Kok); Ida Vihuri (SDTP); and Väinö Voionmaa (SDTP).

==== 1910s ====
===== 1919 =====
Results of the 1919 parliamentary election held on 1, 2 and 3 March 1919:

Party		Party			Electoral Alliance		
Party		Votes	%	Seats	Votes	%	Seats
Social Democratic Labour Party of Finland	SDTP	31,143	55.49%	7	31,143	55.49%	7
National Coalition Party	Kok	13,406	23.89%	3	13,406	23.89%	3
National Progressive Party	KE	7,341	13.08%	1	7,341	13.08%	1
Christian Workers' Union of Finland	KrTL	2,728	4.86%	0	4,160	7.41%	0
Agrarian Party	ML	1,432	2.55%	0	4,160	7.41%	0
Write-in lists		77	0.14%	0	77	0.14%	0
Valid votes		56,127	100.00%	11	56,127	100.00%	11
Rejected votes		237	0.42%				
Total polled		56,364	71.55%				
Registered electors		78,774					

The following candidates were elected: Juhani Arajärvi (Kok); Janne Ihamuotila (Kok); Väinö Lehtola (SDTP); Eemil Linna (KE); Niilo Patinen (SDTP); Hannes Ryömä (SDTP); Elli Tavastähti (Kok); Väinö Vankkoja (SDTP); Emil Viljanen (SDTP); Nikolai Virtanen (SDTP); and Wäinö Wuolijoki (SDTP).

===== 1917 =====
Results of the 1917 parliamentary election held on 1 and 2 October 1917:

Party		Votes	%	Seats
Social Democratic Party of Finland	SDP	37,624	61.90%	7
United Finnish Parties (Finnish Party, Young Finnish Party and People's Party)	SP-NP-KP	19,798	32.57%	4
Christian Workers' Union of Finland	KrTL	3,215	5.29%	0
Write-in lists		148	0.24%	0
Valid votes		60,785	100.00%	11
Rejected votes		274	0.45%	
Total polled		61,059	74.19%	
Registered electors		82,299		

The following candidates were elected: Juhani Arajärvi (SP-NP-KP); Kalle Häkkinen (SP-NP-KP); Anni Huotari (SDP); Anton Huotari (SDP); Juho Lehmus (SDP); Kalle Lepola (SDP); Eemil Linna (SP-NP-KP); Emil Murto (SDP); Eemeli Paronen (SDP); Emil Saarinen (SDP); and Elli Tavastähti (SP-NP-KP).

===== 1916 =====
Results of the 1916 parliamentary election held on 1 and 3 July 1916:

Party		Votes	%	Seats
Social Democratic Party of Finland	SDP	31,475	64.72%	8
Finnish Party	SP	9,591	19.72%	2
Young Finnish Party	NP	4,948	10.17%	1
Christian Workers' Union of Finland	KrTL	2,579	5.30%	0
Write-in lists		40	0.08%	0
Valid votes		48,633	100.00%	11
Rejected votes		228	0.47%	
Total polled		48,861	61.32%	
Registered electors		79,678		

The following candidates were elected: Juhani Arajärvi (SP); Tyyne Eloranta (SDP); Anni Huotari (SDP); Anton Huotari (SDP); August Hyöki (SP); Juho Lehmus (SDP); Kalle Lepola (SDP); Emil Murto (SDP); Jukka Pohjola (SDP); Emil Saarinen (SDP); and Otto Thuneberg (NP).

===== 1913 =====
Results of the 1913 parliamentary election held on 1 and 2 August 1913:

Party		Votes	%	Seats
Social Democratic Party of Finland	SDP	27,830	61.37%	8
Finnish Party	SP	9,568	21.10%	2
Young Finnish Party	NP	5,414	11.94%	1
Christian Workers' Union of Finland	KrTL	2,444	5.39%	0
Write-in lists		90	0.20%	0
Valid votes		45,346	100.00%	11
Rejected votes		1,580	3.37%	
Total polled		46,926	58.68%	
Registered electors		79,965		

The following candidates were elected: Heikki Häyrynen (SDP); Anni Huotari (SDP); Anton Huotari (SDP); Eemil Linna (NP); Eemeli Paronen (SDP); Penna Paunu (SDP); Juho Peura (SDP); Emil Saarinen (SDP); Antti Tulenheimo (SP); Emil Viljanen (SDP); and Eino Sakari Yrjö-Koskinen (SP).

===== 1911 =====
Results of the 1911 parliamentary election held on 2 and 3 January 1911:

Party		Votes	%	Seats
Social Democratic Party of Finland	SDP	27,671	58.19%	7
Finnish Party	SP	10,896	22.91%	3
Young Finnish Party	NP	6,271	13.19%	1
Christian Workers' Union of Finland	KrTL	2,673	5.62%	0
Write-in lists		44	0.09%	0
Valid votes		47,555	100.00%	11
Rejected votes		407	0.85%	
Total polled		47,962	62.50%	
Registered electors		76,735		

The following candidates were elected: Heikki Häyrynen (SDP); Anni Huotari (SDP); Anton Huotari (SDP); Kalle Kaakko-oja (SP); Kaapo Murros (SDP); Ernst Nevanlinna (SP); Penna Paunu (SDP); Jukka Pohjola (SDP); Emil Saarinen (SDP); Kalle Viljakainen (NP); and Eino Sakari Yrjö-Koskinen (SP).

===== 1910 =====
Results of the 1910 parliamentary election held on 1 and 2 February 1910:

Party		Votes	%	Seats
Social Democratic Party of Finland	SDP	27,495	56.32%	7
Finnish Party	SP	11,677	23.92%	3
Young Finnish Party	NP	6,300	12.90%	1
Christian Workers' Union of Finland	KrTL	3,235	6.63%	0
Write-in lists		114	0.23%	0
Valid votes		48,821	100.00%	11
Rejected votes		216	0.44%	
Total polled		49,037	65.96%	
Registered electors		74,346		

The following candidates were elected: Heikki Häyrynen (SDP); Anni Huotari (SDP); Anton Huotari (SDP); Kalle Kaakko-oja (SP); Kaapo Murros (SDP); Ernst Nevanlinna (SP); Penna Paunu (SDP); Jukka Pohjola (SDP); Emil Saarinen (SDP); Kalle Viljakainen (NP); and Eino Sakari Yrjö-Koskinen (SP).

==== 1900s ====
===== 1909 =====
Results of the 1909 parliamentary election held on 1 and 3 May 1909:

Party		Votes	%	Seats
Social Democratic Party of Finland	SDP	28,850	56.74%	7
Finnish Party	SP	11,895	23.39%	3
Young Finnish Party	NP	6,118	12.03%	1
Christian Workers' Union of Finland	KrTL	3,904	7.68%	0
Others		78	0.15%	0
Valid votes		50,845	100.00%	11
Rejected votes		278	0.54%	
Total polled		51,123	69.82%	
Registered electors		73,220		

The following candidates were elected: Heikki Häyrynen (SDP); Anton Huotari (SDP); Sandra Lehtinen (SDP); Kalle Lumio (SDP); Ernst Nevanlinna (SP); Jukka Pohjola (SDP); Yrjö Sirola (SDP); Nestori Telkkä (SDP); Kalle Viljakainen (NP); Toini Voipio (SP); and Eino Sakari Yrjö-Koskinen (SP).

===== 1908 =====
Results of the 1908 parliamentary election held on 1 and 2 July 1908:

Party		Votes	%	Seats
Social Democratic Party of Finland	SDP	27,886	57.06%	7
Finnish Party	SP	11,874	24.30%	3
Young Finnish Party	NP	5,730	11.72%	1
Christian Workers' Union of Finland	KrTL	3,256	6.66%	0
Others		125	0.26%	0
Valid votes		48,871	100.00%	11
Rejected votes		427	0.87%	
Total polled		49,298	69.07%	
Registered electors		71,371		

The following candidates were elected: Anton Ahlström (SDP); Hedvig Gebhard (SP); Anton Huotari (SDP); Olga Jokisalo (SDP); Sandra Lehtinen (SDP); Ernst Nevanlinna (SP); Penna Paunu (SDP); Yrjö Sirola (SDP); Nestori Telkkä (SDP); Kalle Viljakainen (NP); and Eino Sakari Yrjö-Koskinen (SP).

===== 1907 =====
Results of the 1907 parliamentary election held on 15 and 16 March 1907:

Party		Votes	%	Seats
Social Democratic Party of Finland	SDP	29,932	55.87%	7
Finnish Party	SP	14,544	27.15%	3
Young Finnish Party	NP	4,728	8.83%	1
Christian Workers' Union of Finland	KrTL	2,981	5.56%	0
Others		1,385	2.59%	0
Valid votes		53,570	100.00%	11
Rejected votes		641	1.18%	
Total polled		54,211	76.39%	
Registered electors		70,969		

The following candidates were elected: Hedvig Gebhard (SP); Heikki Häyrynen (SDP); Karl Gustaf Höijer (SDP); Heikki Lindroos (SDP); Ernst Nevanlinna (SP); Penna Paunu (SDP); Sandra Reinholdsson (SDP); Yrjö Sirola (SDP); Nils Robert af Ursin (SDP); Kalle Viljakainen (NP); and Eino Sakari Yrjö-Koskinen (SP).
