= Paunu =

Paunu is a surname. Notable people with the surname include:

- Ahti Paunu, Finnish singer
- Päivi Paunu (1946–2016), Finnish singer
- Penna Paunu (1868–1920), Finnish cooperative manager and politician
