= Miko Bergbom =

Finnish politician (born 1996)

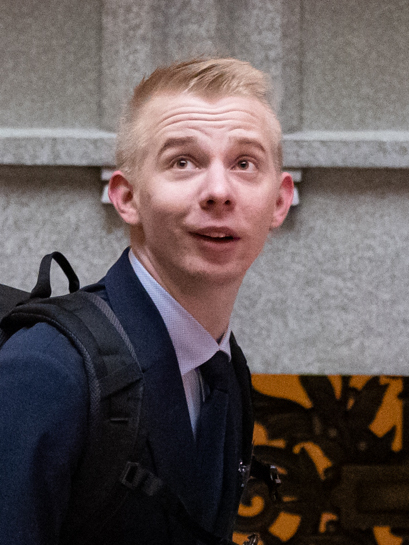
- Bergbom in 2023

Member of the Parliament of Finland
- Incumbent
- Assumed office 5 April 2023
- Constituency: Pirkanmaa

Personal details
- Born: 7 February 1996 (age 30) Nokia, Pirkanmaa, Finland
- Party: Finns Party
- Education: Surface finisher

Miko Christian Bergbom (born 7 February 1996) is a Finnish politician serving as a member of the Parliament of Finland since 2023. From 2020 to 2022, he served as chairman of Perussuomalainen Nuoriso.
