= Arto Pirttilahti =

Finnish politician

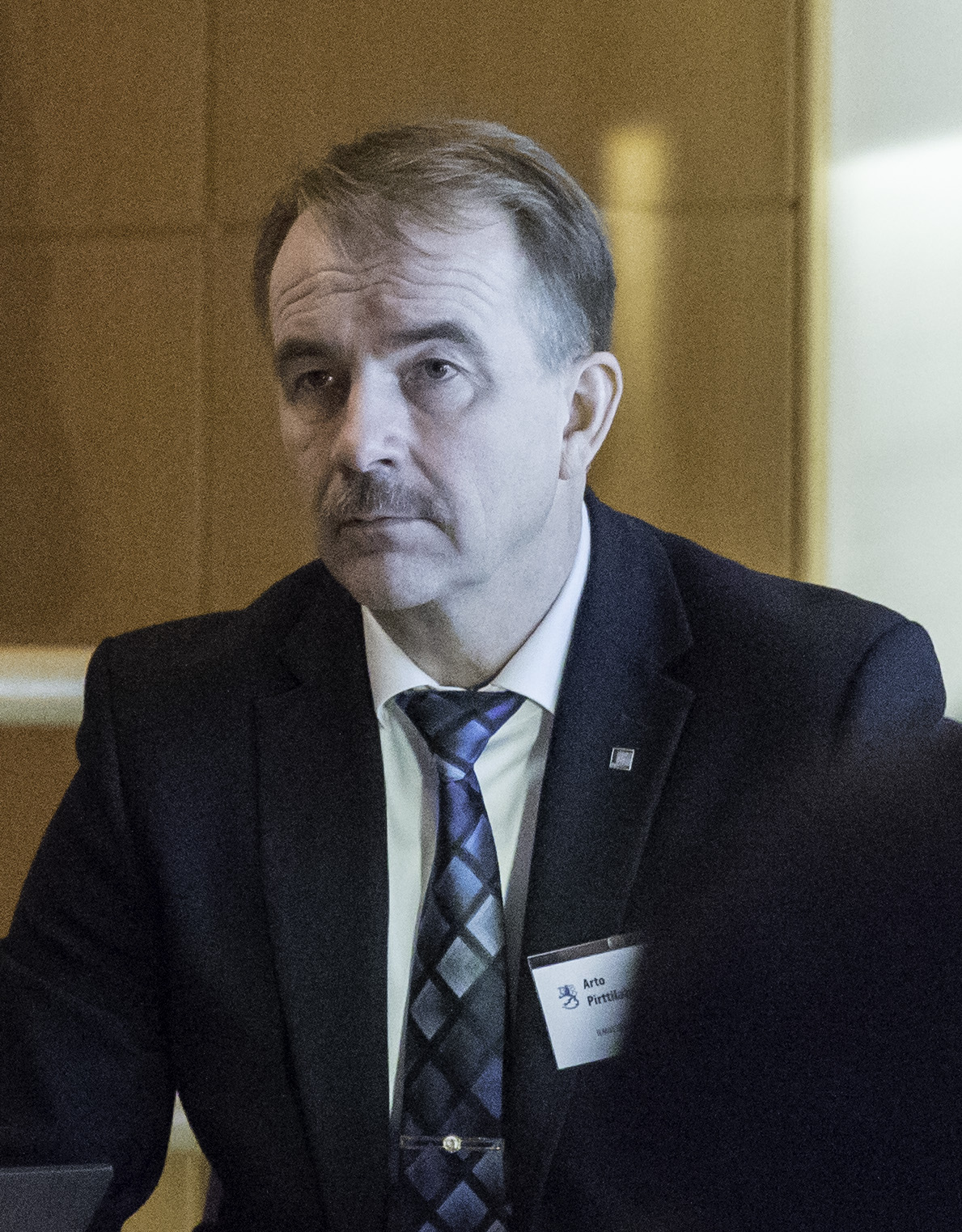

Member of the Finnish Parliament for Pirkanmaa
- Incumbent
- Assumed office 20 April 2011

Personal details
- Born: 4 April 1963 (age 63) Pohjaslahti, Pirkanmaa, Finland
- Party: Centre Party
- Education: Hämeen ammattikorkeakoulu Mustiala (1988), Haapamäen Lukio
- Occupation: Agronomist

Arto Väinö Uolevi Pirttilahti (born 4 April 1963 in Pohjaslahti) is a Finnish politician in the Parliament of Finland since 2011 for the Centre Party at the Pirkanmaa constituency.
