= Joakim Vigelius =

Finnish politician

Member of the Parliament
- Incumbent
- Assumed office 5 April 2023
- Constituency: Pirkanmaa

Personal details
- Born: 30 January 1997 (age 29)
- Party: Finns Party
- Education: Bachelor of social sciences
- Alma mater: University of Tampere
- Website: https://joakimvigelius.fi

Joakim Mikael Vigelius (born 30 January 1997) is a Finnish politician of the Finns Party, a member of the Parliament, and a former regional councilor in the Pirkanmaa welfare region. He served as the chairman of the Finns Party Youth from 2022 to 2023, until he resigned from the youth organization's chairmanship and the regional council after being elected to the Parliament from the Pirkanmaa district in the 2023 parliamentary elections.

== Biography ==
Vigelius graduated from the University of Tampere with a Bachelor of Social Sciences in November 2021. His bachelor's thesis was titled "The European Union as a federation: content analysis of the European Union as a federalist political system". His major is political science, and his minors include administrative science, municipal and regional management, public law, and international politics.

Vigelius became known on social media when, in November 2020, a lecturer at the University of Tampere, Tuula Juvonen, removed him from her course "Equality and Gender Equality in Society." Vigelius had questioned the lecturer's stories about "men with menstruation" and shared discussions from the lecture on social media. He learned of his removal from the course from fellow participants, as the teacher had informed others before informing Vigelius days later. According to various sources, Vigelius was accused of breaching the course's privacy practices, and the university's lawyer stated that he had behaved violently or threateningly towards another student or staff member. However, Vigelius was reinstated in the course before the next lecture.

== Career ==
In the 2021 municipal elections, Vigelius was elected to the Tampere City Council with 1,240 votes, which was the fourth-highest number of votes on the Finns Party list. In the 2022 regional elections, Vigelius ranked second on the Finns Party list with 1,272 votes and was elected to the Pirkanmaa regional council. He also serves as a member of the regional executive committee. In the 2023 parliamentary elections, Vigelius was elected to the Parliament with 10,113 votes from the Pirkanmaa district.

In June 2025, he ascended to the position of the second vice chairman of the Finns party after the party convention of 2025.

=== Overnight Stay at the Parliament's Expense in Hometown ===
In September 2023, Ilta-Sanomat reported that Vigelius had stayed at the Radisson Blu Grand Hotel Tammer in his hometown of Tampere at the taxpayers' expense during a law committee trip. He admitted to making a mistake in the matter but clarified that he did not know in advance that the committee would be staying in Tampere. Ilta-Sanomat wrote that, according to their information, Vigelius was asked at the hotel check-in if he really intended to stay in a hotel in his own hometown. He reportedly responded by complaining about the level of his own apartment. Vigelius later denied this. The Parliament's administrative director, Pertti Rauhio, said he would ask Vigelius for further clarification on the matter. According to Rauhio, there must be a particularly compelling reason for Vigelius's actions. Vigelius reimbursed the Parliament for the costs incurred from the overnight stay after Ilta-Sanomat reported on the matter. Vigelius has previously been characterized as a critic of MPs' benefits, such as the taxi card.
