= Veijo Niemi =

Finnish politician

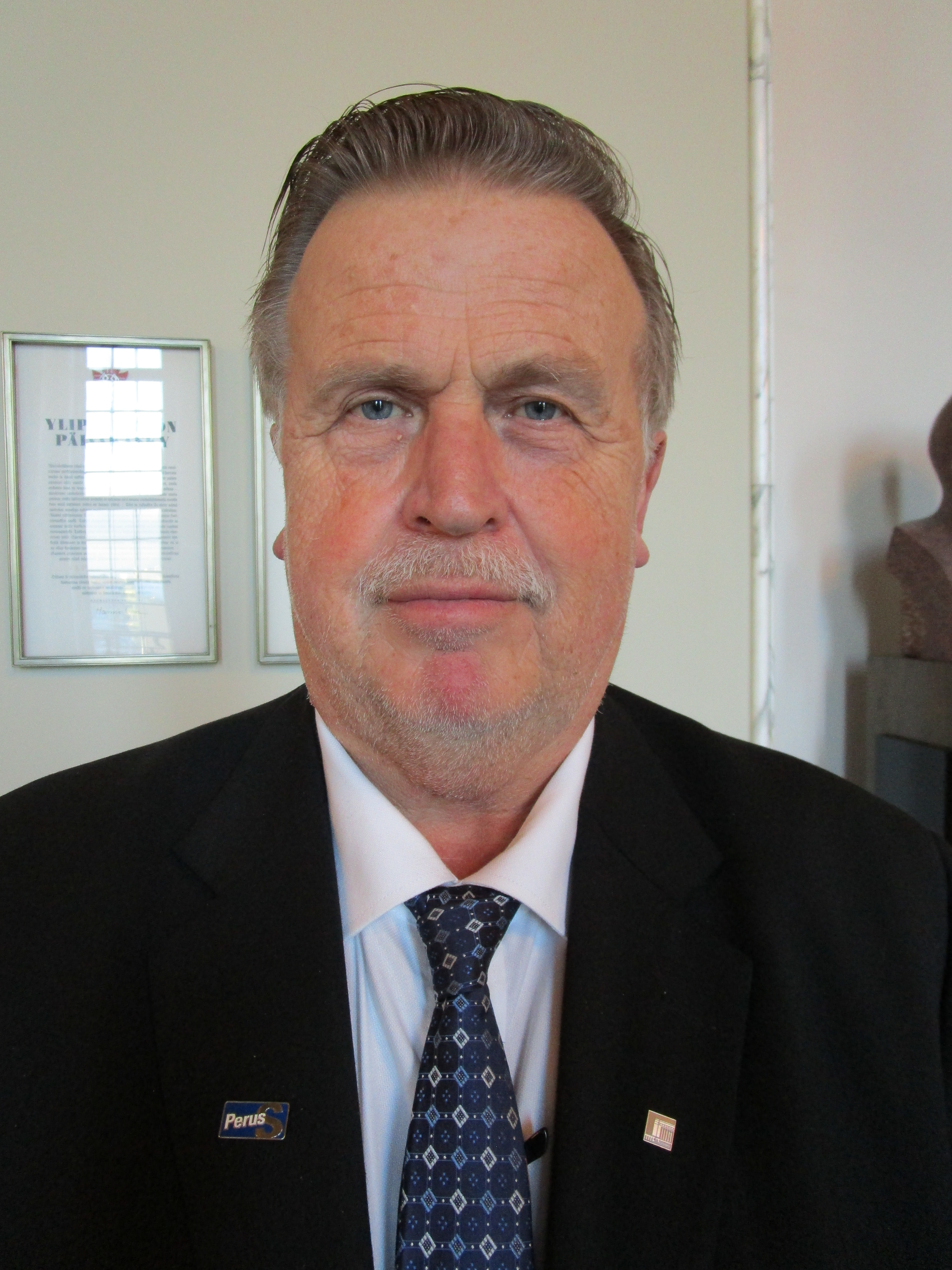

Member of the Finnish Parliament for Pirkanmaa
- Incumbent
- Assumed office 17 April 2019

Personal details
- Born: 4 June 1954 (age 71) Lempäälä, Pirkanmaa, Finland
- Party: Finns Party

Veijo Olavi Niemi (born 4 June 1954) is a Finnish politician currently serving in the Parliament of Finland for the Finns Party at the Pirkanmaa constituency.
