= Toivo Hietala =

Finnish lawyer, bank director and politician (1898–1974)

Toivo Ilmari Hietala (1 June 1898 – 29 April 1974) was a Finnish lawyer, bank director and politician, born in Tampere. He was a member of the Parliament of Finland from 1958 to 1970, representing the National Coalition Party. He was a presidential elector in the 1962 Finnish presidential election. Toivo Hietala was the son-in-law of Kalle Häkkinen.
