= Leena Rauhala =

Finnish politician (1942–2024)

Member of the Parliament of Finland
- In office 24 March 1999 – 21 April 2015

Personal details
- Born: Leena Maria Rauhala; 28 February 1942 Kouvola, Finland
- Died: 2 March 2024 (aged 82)
- Party: Christian Democrats
- Children: Minna-Kristiina; Teemu; Vesa; Marketta; Tuomo
- Occupation: Nurse

Leena Rauhala (28 February 1942 – 2 March 2024) was a Finnish politician who was a member of the Parliament of Finland 1999–2015 representing Pirkanmaa.

== Life and career ==
Rauhala was a Member of Parliament from 1999 to 2015. She was a member of the Chancellery Committee, the Finance Committee, the Subcommittee for Education and Science and the Committee for the Future. Previously, she had been a member of the Grand Committee, the Education and Culture Committee, the Social Affairs and Health Committee, the Employment and Equality Committee, the Environment Committee, the Legal Affairs Committee, the Finnish Delegation to the Nordic Council, the Board of the Library of Parliament and the Inter-Parliamentary Union, Finnish Group. In 2004, Rauhala was a candidate for the Chair of the Christian Democrats, finishing third behind Päivi Räsänen and Peter Östman. Rauhala died on 2 March 2024, at the age of 82.
