= Kaisa Hiilelä =

Finnish politician

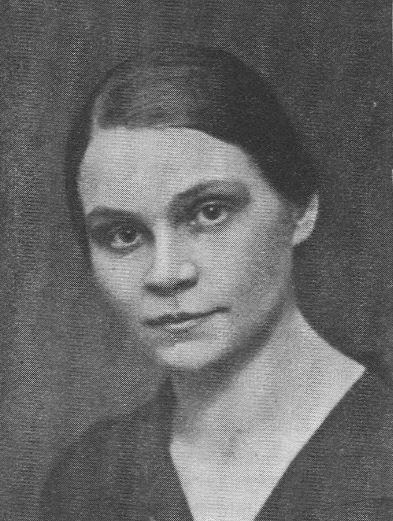
- Kaisa Hiilelä in 1930

Member of the Finnish Parliament for Häme North constituency
- In office 21 October 1930 – 21 July 1958

Personal details
- Born: 23 October 1891 Lempäälä, Grand Duchy of Finland
- Died: 4 April 1977 (aged 85) Tampere, Finland
- Party: Social Democratic Party of Finland

Amanda Katariina (Kaisa) Hiilelä (born Hildén, 23 October 1891 – 4 April 1977) was a Finnish politician. She was a member of the Parliament of Finland 1930–1958 for the Social Democratic Party of Finland.

== Life and career ==
Hiilelä was born to a peasant family in Lempäälä. She worked as a maid until 1907 when she was employed by the Finlayson cotton mill in Tampere. She joined the Social Democratic Party in 1908. In 1916-1919 Hiilelä worked as a treasurer of the Tampere Workers' Society and 1920–1946 the treasurer and secretary of the Paperworkers' Union.

Hiilelä was elected to the Parliament of Finland in 1930. She was a member of the electoral college in the 1931, 1950 and 1956 presidential elections and a member of the Tampere City Council.

== Family ==
Kaisa Hiilelä's sister was the politician Ida Vihuri. The Minister of Education Reino Oittinen was their nephew.
