= Janne Ihamuotila =

Finnish politician (1868–1929)

Johan Adolf ("Janne") Ihamuotila (né Michelsson; (Note: The former patronymic Michelsson was replaced (date unknown) with the name of the family house Ihamuotila.) 7 October 1868, Maaria — 21 January 1929, Ylöjärvi) was a Finnish farmer and politician.

== Personal life ==
Johan Adolf Michelsson was born into a farming family as the first of seven children, to Johan August Michelsson and Matilda Henrika née Matintytär.

He completed primary school, followed by farming school, from where he graduated in 1897.

In 1901, he married Matilda Aleksandra née Koski.

He worked as a foreman in manor houses in Kimito (1897-1904) and Pirkkala (1904-1914), before acquiring his own farm in Ylöjärvi in 1914.

Ihamuotila was granted the honorary title of Kunnallisneuvos (lit. 'Municipal Counselor').

== Politics ==
Ihamuotila was elected member of the Parliament of Finland for the Häme North constituency, first representing the National Coalition Party from 1919 to 1922, and later the Agrarian League from 1924 until his death in 1929. He served on the Agriculture & Forestry and Commerce Committees.

As a member of the electoral college of the 1925 Finnish presidential election, Ihamuotila helped elect the Agrarian League candidate Lauri Kristian Relander as the second President of Finland.

Alongside his parliamentary career, Ihamuotila also chaired the municipal council of his home town Ylöjärvi, as well as serving on various agricultural policy and administrative bodies both regionally and nationally, including on the council of the Central Union of Agricultural Producers and Forest Owners.
