= Sari Tanus =

Finnish politician

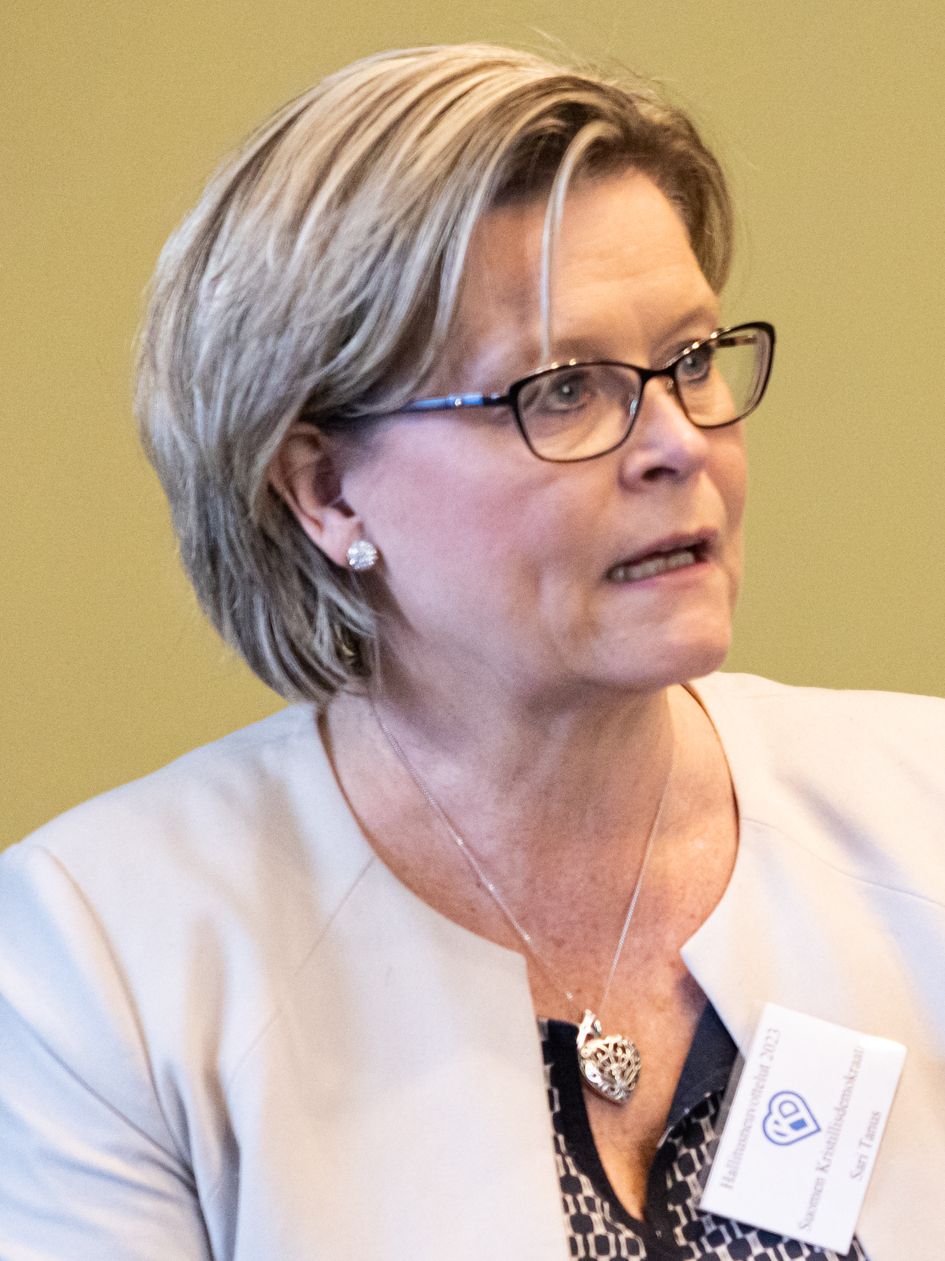
- Tanus in June 2023.

Personal details
- Born: 22 February 1964 (age 61); Kuopio, Northern Savonia, Finland
- Political party: Christian Democrats

Sari Marja Hannele Tanus (born 22 February 1964 in Kuopio, Finland) is a Finnish doctor and politician, representing the Christian Democrats in the Parliament of Finland since 2015. She was elected to the Parliament from the Pirkanmaa constituency in the 2015 elections with 2,592 votes.
