= Tero Rönni =

Finnish politician (1954–2023)

Member of the Parliament of Finland for Pirkanmaa
- In office 24 March 1999 – 19 April 2011

Personal details
- Born: Tero Matti Johannes Rönni; 3 March 1954 Parkano, Finland
- Died: 12 October 2023 (aged 69)
- Party: SDP
- Occupation: Chauffeur

Tero Rönni (3 March 1954 – 12 October 2023) was a Finnish chauffeur and politician. A member of the Social Democratic Party, he served in the Parliament of Finland from 1999 to 2011.

Rönni died on 12 October 2023, at the age of 69.
