= Sami Savio =

Finnish politician

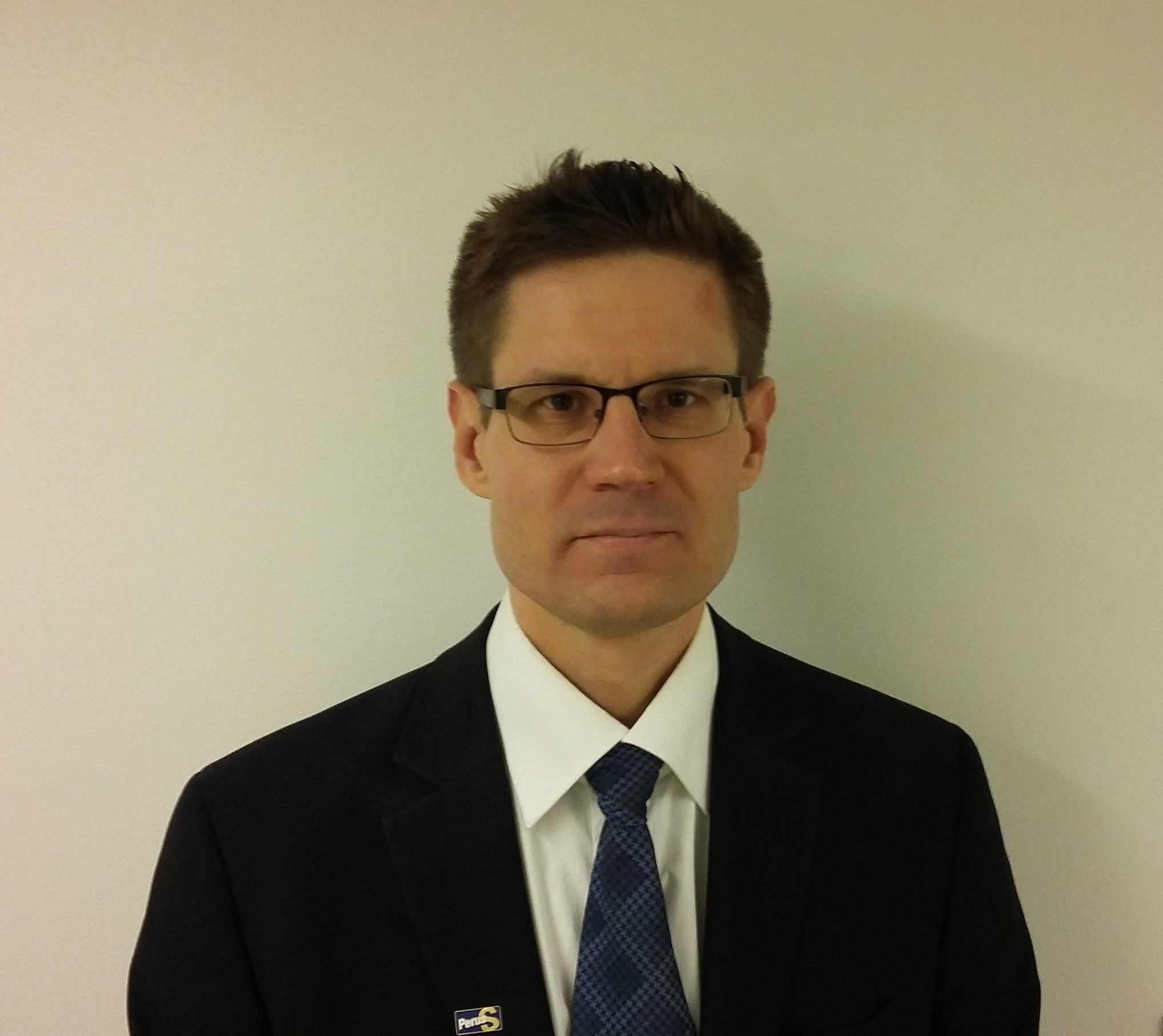

Member of the Finnish Parliament for Pirkanmaa

Personal details
- Born: 23 September 1975 (age 50) Mäntyharju, Southern Savonia, Finland
- Party: Finns Party

Sami Juhani Savio (born 23 September 1975) is a Finnish politician currently serving in the Parliament of Finland for the Finns Party at the Pirkanmaa constituency.
