= Jouni Ovaska =

Finnish politician

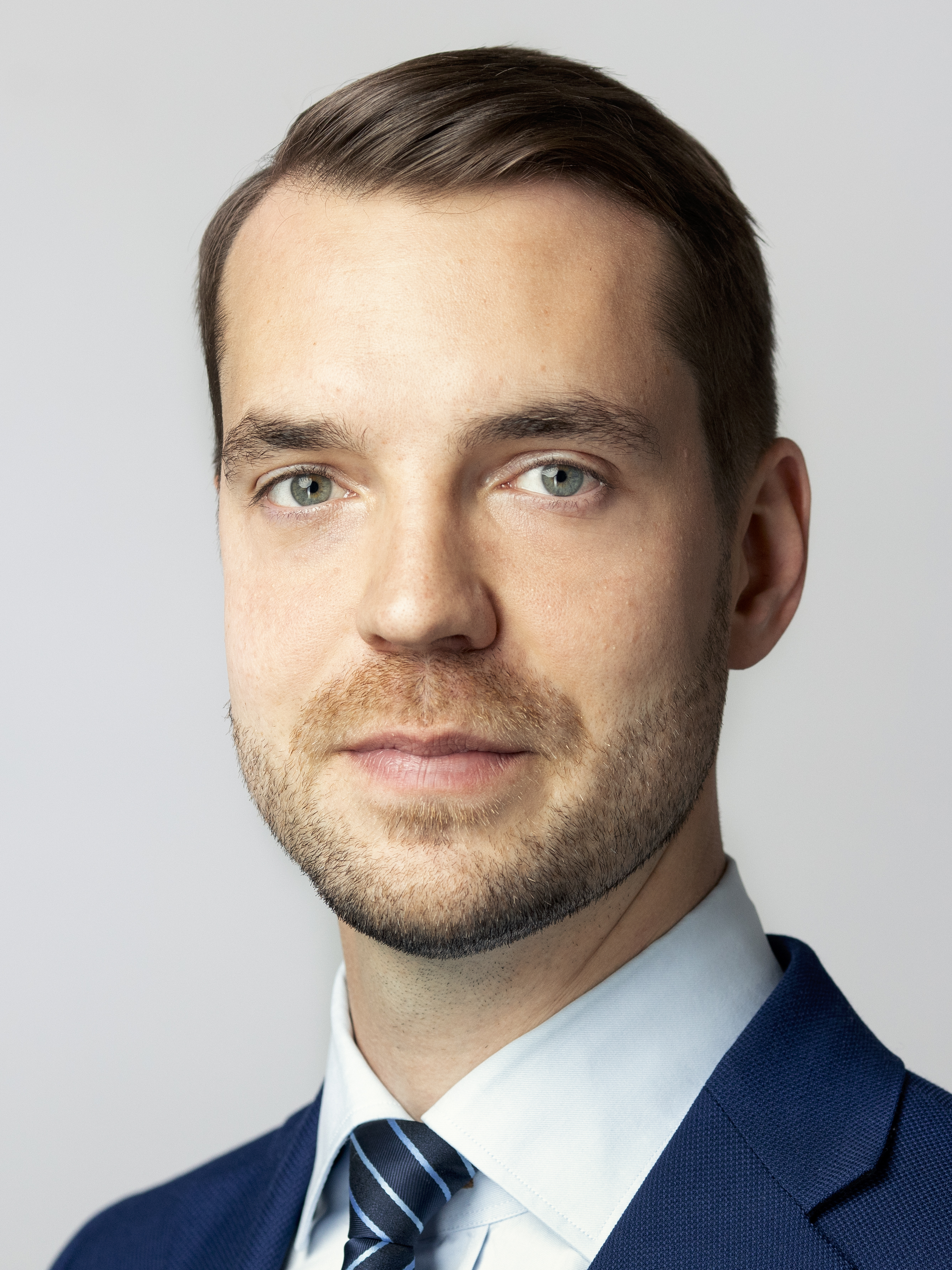
- Jouni Ovaska

Member of the Finnish Parliament for Pirkanmaa
- Incumbent
- Assumed office 17 April 2019

Personal details
- Born: 9 September 1986 (age 40) Hämeenkyrö, Pirkanmaa, Finland
- Party: Centre Party
- Education: Tampere University

Jouni Einari Ovaska (born 9 September 1986 in Hämeenkyrö) is a Finnish politician currently serving in the Parliament of Finland for the Centre Party at the Pirkanmaa constituency. He was elected to parliament first time in the 2019 election.

== Education ==
Ovaska graduated from high school at 2005. After completing his military service in the Parola Armored Brigade, he started his university studies. Ovaska graduated for bachelor of elementary education and teaching at 2009 and for master of education at 2014 from the Tampere university. During his studies he worked as the parliamentary assistant for MP Tuomo Puumala.

== Political career ==
Ovaska started his political career at his home town. In 2007-2010 he served on the Hämeenkyrö Parish Church Council. He was elected to Hämeenkyrö municipal council for the first time at 2008 and again 2012. He led the municipal government of Hämeenkyrö in 2013–2016.

Ovaska was elected Chairman of the Center Party Council at 2012 and again at 2014. In 2016–2018, Ovaska served as the Party Secretary of the Center Party.

In the 2011 parliamentary elections, Ovaska was a candidate for the first time from the Pirkanmaa constituency and received 1,211 votes. In the 2014 European parliament elections, Ovaska received 2,897 votes. In the 2015 parliamentary elections, Ovaska reached 4,454 votes and was selected as debuty member of Finnish parliament.

In 2019, he was elected to Parliament with 5,360 votes. Committee memberships: Committee on Foreign Affairs, Committee on Legal Affairs, Grand Committee, Committee on Education (alternate).
