= Veikko Vallin =

Finnish politician

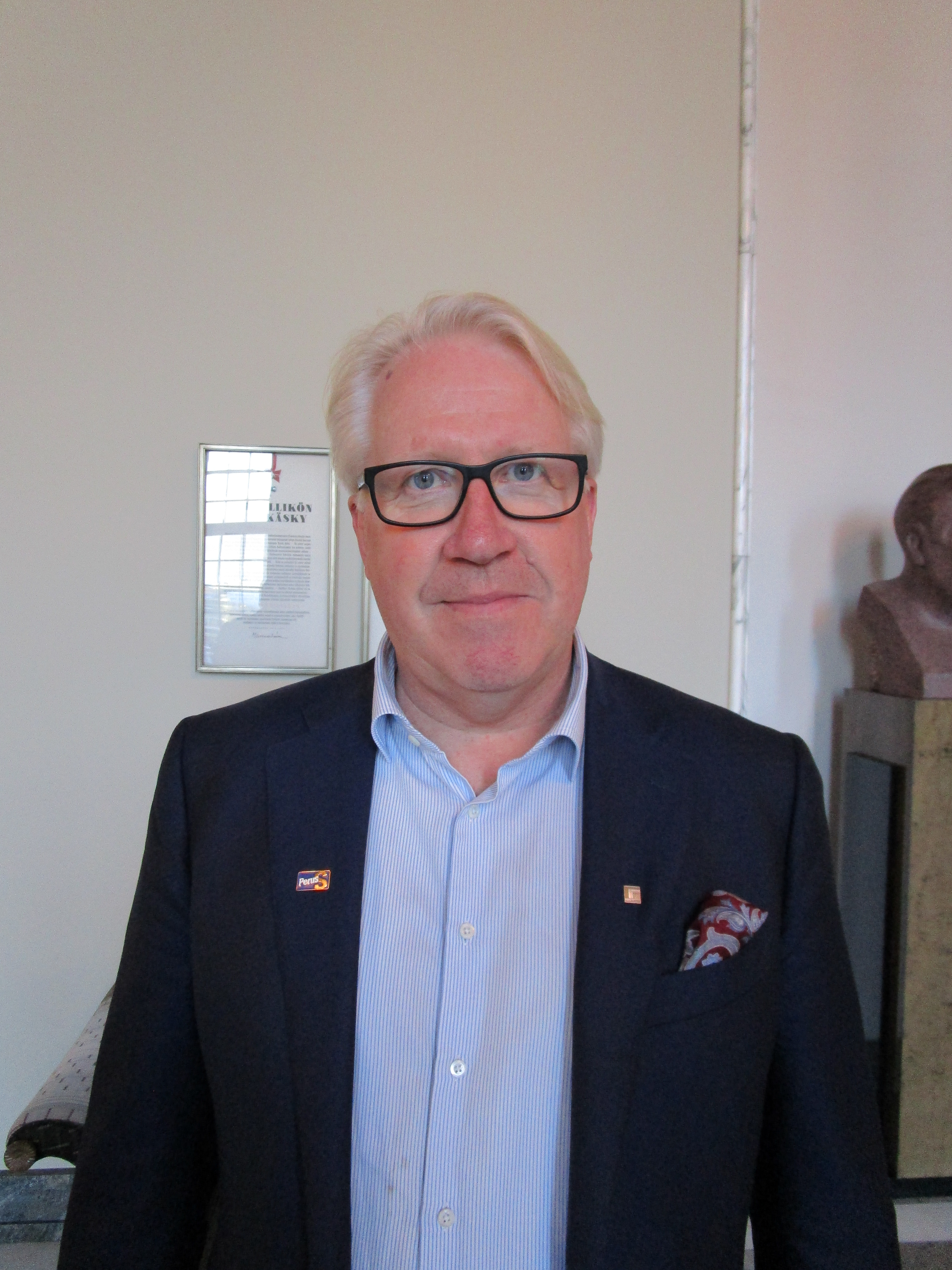
- Vallin in December 2019

Member of the Finnish Parliament for Pirkanmaa
- In office 17 April 2019 – 4 April 2023

Personal details
- Born: 15 May 1962 (age 63) Tampere, Pirkanmaa, Finland
- Party: Finns Party

Veikko Juhani Vallin (born 15 May 1962 in Tampere) is a Finnish politician and businessman. He was a member of the Parliament of Finland for the Finns Party at the Pirkanmaa constituency.
