= Väinö Pastell =

Finnish politician

Väinö Elias Pastell (14 May 1881 - 8 September 1949) was a Finnish farmer and politician. He was born in Sääminki, and was a member of the Parliament of Finland from 1927 to 1929, representing the National Coalition Party.
