= Eemeli Paronen =

Finnish politician

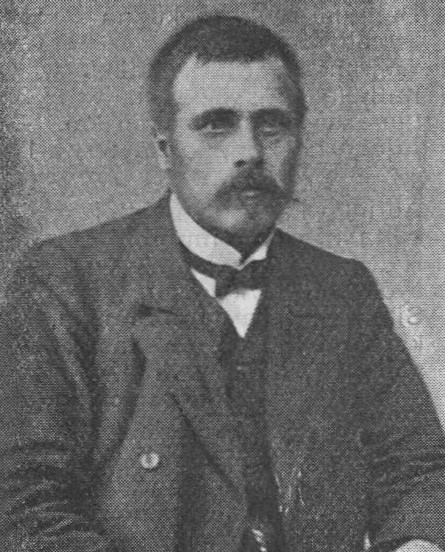

Eemeli Paronen (31 March 1879, Ruovesi – 23 November 1957) was a Finnish smallholder and politician. He was a Member of the Parliament of Finland from 1913 to 1916 and again from 1917 to 1918, representing the Social Democratic Party of Finland (SDP). He sided with the Reds during the Finnish Civil War in 1918 and fled to Soviet Russia after the defeat of the Red side. He returned to Finland in 1920 and was imprisoned for some time for his role on the losing side of the Civil War.
