= Kuuno Honkonen =

Finnish politician and high jumper

Personal information
- Born: 1 March 1922 Jakobstad, Finland
- Died: 9 July 1985 (aged 63) Tampere, Finland
- Height: 182 cm (6 ft 0 in)
- Weight: 73 kg (161 lb)

Sport
- Sport: Athletics
- Event: High jump
- Club: Tampereen Kisatoverit

Achievements and titles
- Personal best: 1.96 m (1948)

Kuuno Ola Honkonen (1 March 1922 – 9 July 1985) was a Finnish politician in the left-wing Finnish People's Democratic League. He was a member of the Finnish parliament, Eduskunta, from 1958 until 1979. In 1979, he became the Finnish ambassador to East Germany.

Honkonen was also an athlete, who finished 17th in the high jump at the 1948 Olympics.
