= Atte Pakkanen =

Finnish politician (1912–1994)

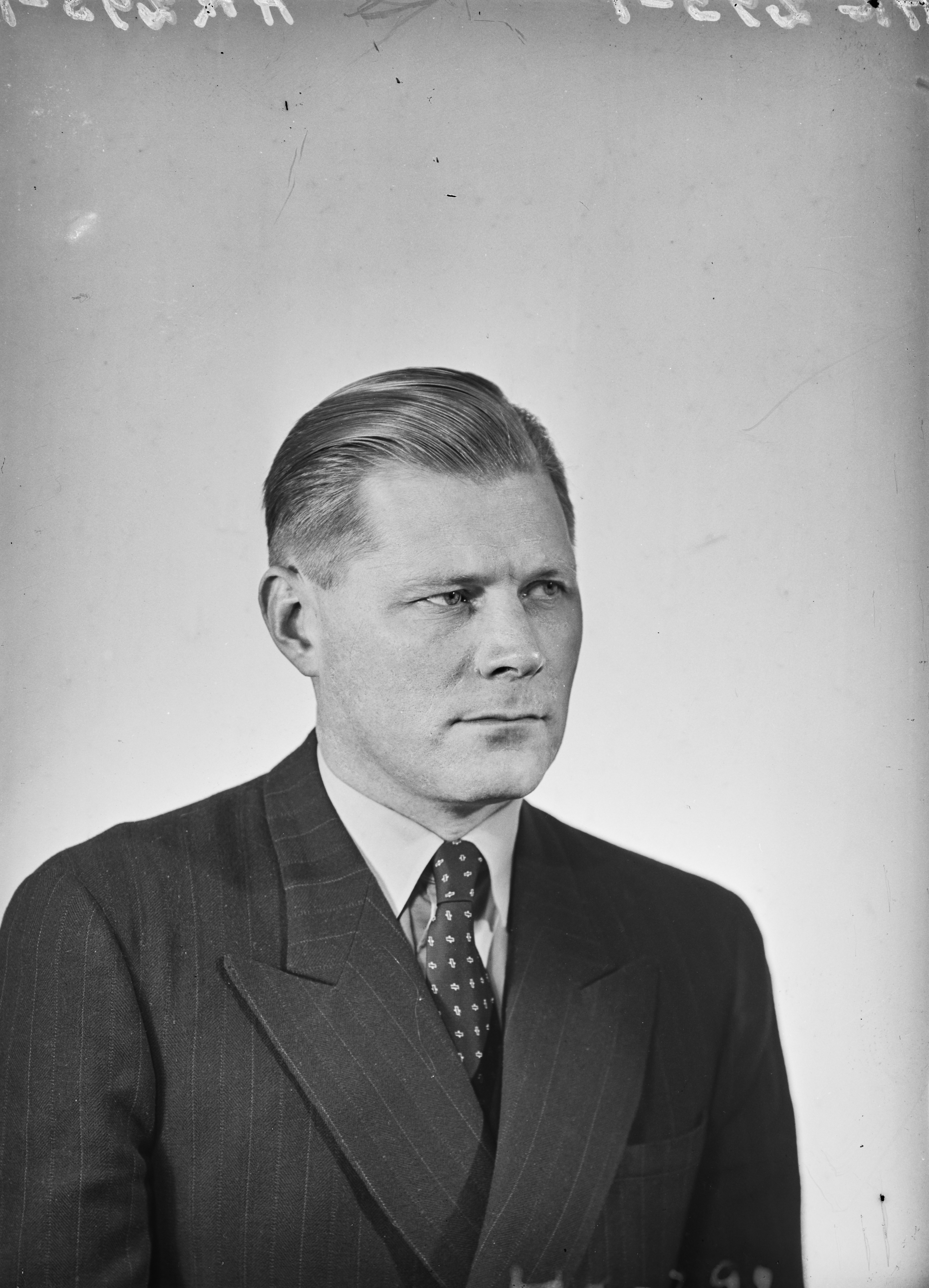
Atte Pakkanen

Atte Mikael Johannes Pakkanen (13 November 1912, in Urjala – 22 December 1994) was a Finnish politician. He was Minister of Defence from 27 May to 1 September 1957 and Minister of the Interior from 29 August 1958 to 12 January 1959. He was a Member of the Parliament of Finland from 1948 to 1970, representing the Agrarian League, in 1965 renamed the Centre Party.
