= Sofia Vikman =

Finnish politician

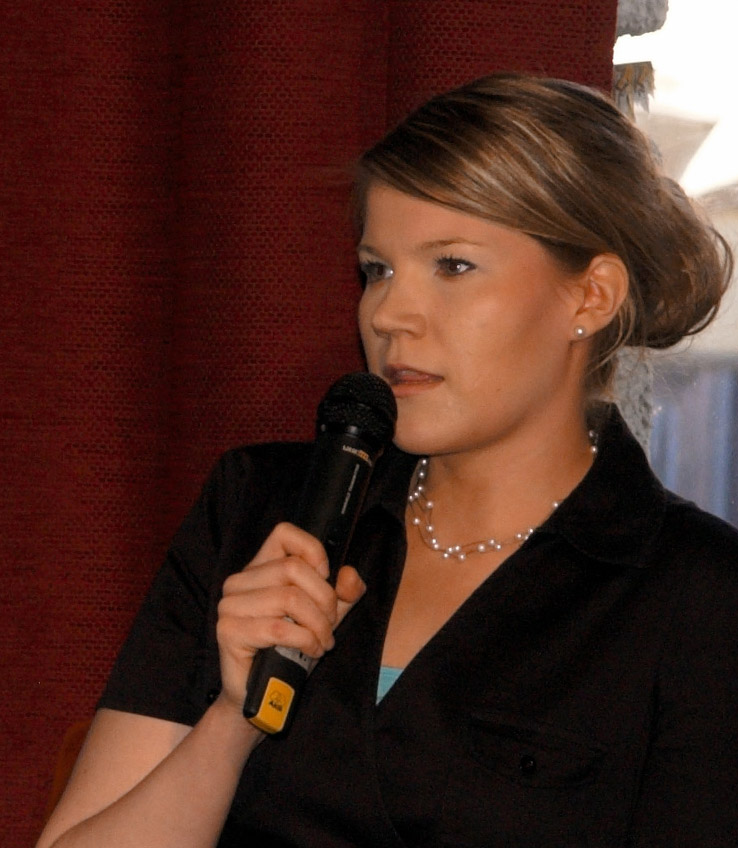
Sofia Vikman in 2009.

Maria Sofia Charlotta Vikman (born 12 May 1983) is a Finnish politician and a member of the Finnish Parliament, representing the National Coalition Party. Vikman was born in Tampere, and was first elected to the parliament in 2011, gaining 8,279 votes in the elections. She was re-elected in 2015 with 9,473 votes.

Vikman has also been a member of the City Council of Tampere since 2009.
