= Eemil Linna =

Finnish politician

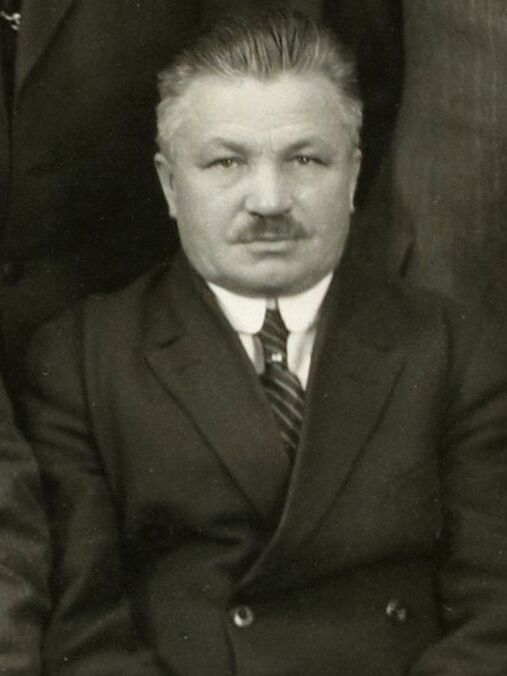

Kustaa Eemil Linna (17 January 1876 – 10 January 1951) was a Finnish farmer and politician. He served as Minister of Agriculture from 22 December 1928 to 16 August 1929, Minister of Transport and Public Works from 14 December 1932 to 25 September 1936, Deputy Minister of Agriculture from 19 January 1934 to 25 September 1936 and again as Minister of Agriculture from 25 September to 7 October 1936.

Linna was born in Pälkäne. He was a member of the Parliament of Finland from 1913 to 1916 and again from 1917 to 1930. He represented the Young Finnish Party until 1918 and the National Progressive Party from 1918 on.

His son Antti also became a politician.
