= Lauri Lyly =

Finnish politician (born 1953)

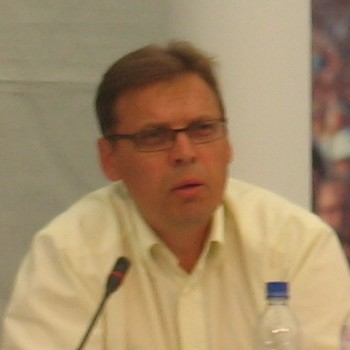
- Lyly in 2009

Mayor of Tampere
- In office 12 June 2017 – 16 August 2021
- Preceded by: Anna-Kaisa Ikonen
- Succeeded by: Anna-Kaisa Ikonen

Personal details
- Born: 20 February 1953 (age 73) Seinäjoki, Finland
- Party: SDP
- Spouse: Tuula Lyly
- Children: 3

Lauri Matias Lyly (born 20 February 1953, Seinäjoki) is a Finnish trade unionist and politician who served as the mayor of Tampere since 2017 until 2021. He is married with Tuula Lyly and the couple has three children.

== Early life and career ==
Lyly was born in Seinäjoki, in 1953. His father worked as a painter and mother as a sewer. He left his childhood home at the age of 15 and moved to Vaasa in order to study. In 1971 he became an electrician. After this be became a technician.

Between 1972–1989 Lyly worked as an electric technician in a few places around Western Finland. In 1989 he became a trade unionist as he started as secretary in Finnish Electrical Workers' Union. In 1997 he was elected as the chairperson of the union. Between 2009–2016 he was the chairperson of the Central Organisation of Finnish Trade Unions after which he retired.

== Political career and as mayor ==
In February 2017 Lyly came back from the retirement and decided to run in municipal election.

Lyly was elected as the mayor of Tampere on 12 June 2017 after that year's municipal election. As mayor Lyly's most important function is to be work as the chairperson of the city government. The number of 4-year-terms is not limited and the same person can be re-elected as mayor.

In January 2021 Lyly announced that he has been nominated as the mayoral candidate of the Social Democratic Party in Tampere in upcoming municipal election and is seeking re-election. Lyly received 2,492 votes, and Anna-Kaisa Ikonen from NCP was nominated as the mayor on August 16.
