= Erkki Pystynen =

Finnish politician (1929–2026)

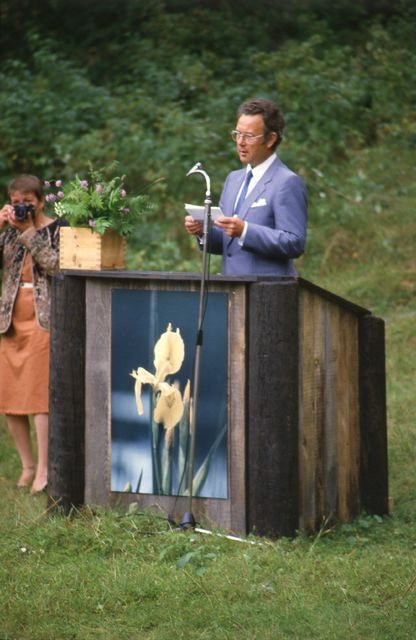
Pystynen in 1984

Erkki Topias Pystynen (2 November 1929 – 13 July 2026) was a Finnish politician from the National Coalition Party.

== Life and career ==
Pystynen was born in Heinola on 2 November 1929.

He was a professor in Tampere University.

Pystynen was elected to the parliament in 1975 and served as the speaker from 1983 to 1986. He left the Parliament in 1991.

Pystynen died on 13 July 2026, at the age of 96. His death was announced on 9 August.

Political offices
Preceded by Johannes Virolainen	Speaker of the Parliament of Finland; 1983–1986	Succeeded by Ilkka Suominen
