= Yrjö Pulkkinen =

Finnish lawyer and politician

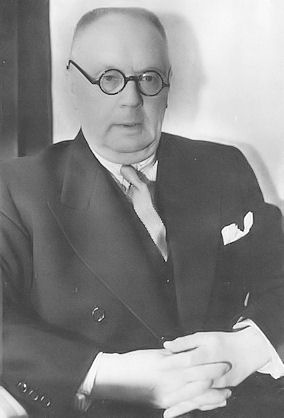
Yrjö Pulkkinen

Yrjö Rafael Pulkkinen (1 April 1875 – 4 February 1945) was a Finnish lawyer and politician, who was born in Parkano. He was a member of the National Coalition Party. He served as Minister of Finance in Lauri Ingman's second cabinet (31 May 1924 – 31 March 1925), as Minister of Trade and Industry in Antti Tulenheimo's cabinet (31 March 1925 – 31 July 1925) and as a Member of Parliament (5 September 1922 – 31 July 1929).
