= Otto Thuneberg =

Finnish farmer and politician (1865–1941)

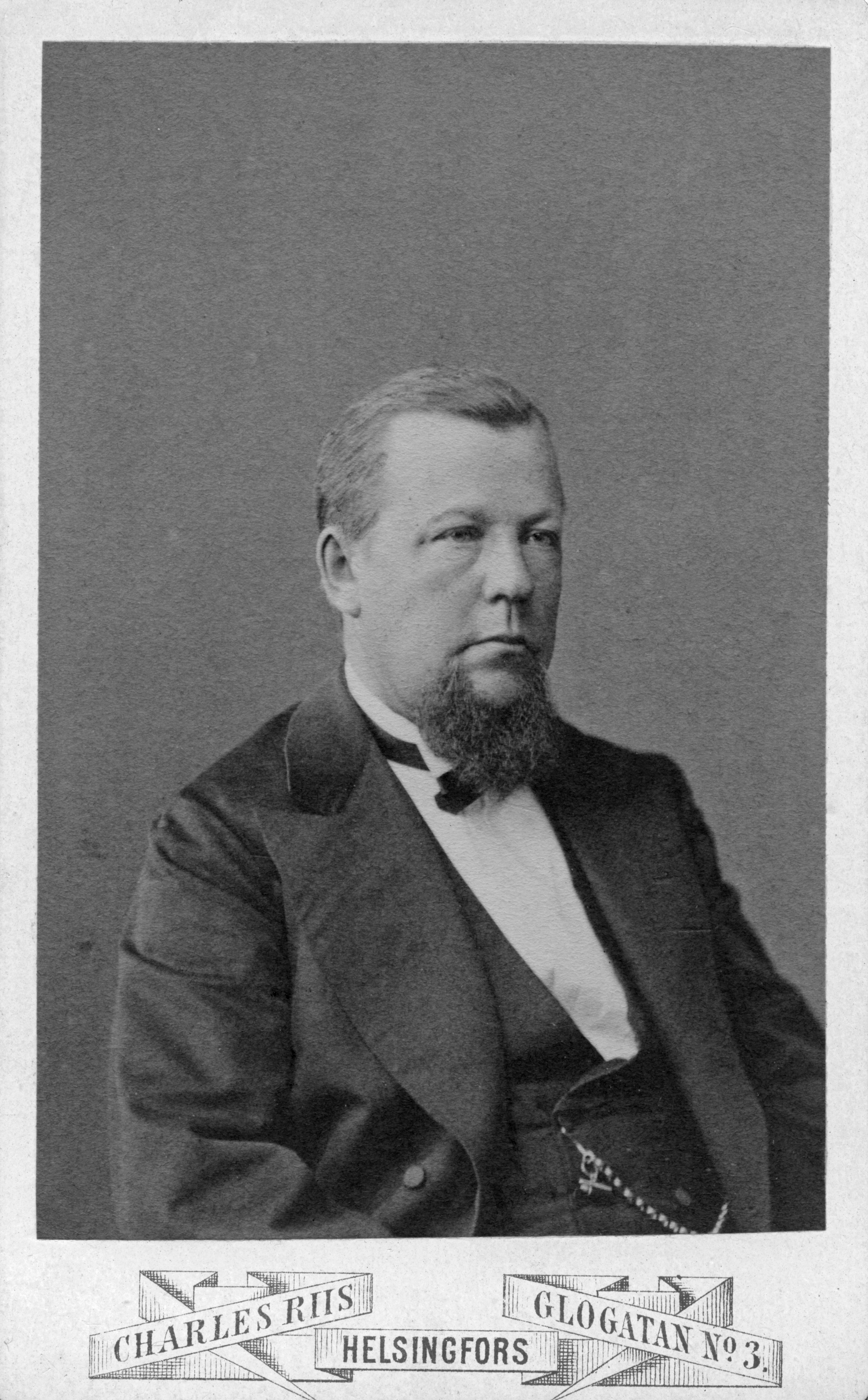
Image of Karl Otto Thuneberg

Otto Albert Thuneberg (12 December 1865 – 15 April 1941) was a Finnish farmer and politician, born in Pirkkala. He was a member of the Diet of Finland from 1904 to 1905 and of the Parliament of Finland from 1916 to 1917 and from 1922 to 1924. Thuneberg belonged to the Young Finnish Party until December 1918 and to the National Coalition Party after that.
