= Kalle Viljakainen =

Finnish politician

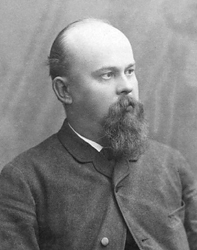
Kalle Viljakainen.

Kalle Viljakainen (18 March 1853, Joroinen – 17 April 1913) was a Finnish journalist and politician. He belonged to the Young Finnish Party. He was a Member of the Diet of Finland from 1894 to 1906 and a Member of the Parliament of Finland from 1907 until his death in 1913.
