= Toini Voipio =

Finnish educator and politician (1878–1937)

Toini Voipio (23 May 1878 – 2 April 1937; original surname Åkerman) was a Finnish educator and politician, born in Vyborg. She was a member of the Parliament of Finland from 1909 to 1910, representing the Finnish Party.
