= Alpo Lumme =

Finnish schoolteacher and politician (1890–1973)

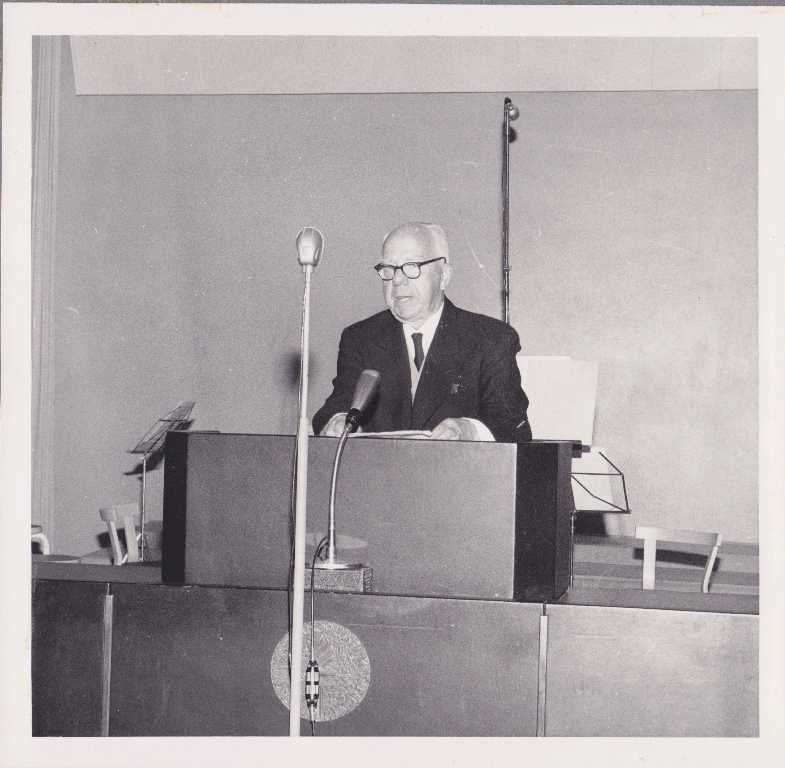
Alpo Lumme in 1963

Frans Albert (Alpo) Lumme (27 April 1890 – 17 November 1973; surname until 1906 Lindholm) was a Finnish schoolteacher and politician, born in Vihti. He was a member of the Parliament of Finland from 1933 to 1949, representing the Social Democratic Party of Finland (SDP). He was the governor of Mikkeli Province from 1949 to 1957. He was a presidential elector in the 1937, 1940 and 1943 presidential elections.
