= Anton Huotari =

Finnish politician and journalist

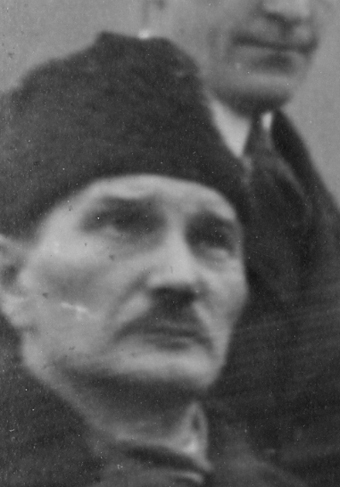
Anton Huotari

Anton Huotari (21 January 1881 in Nurmes – 7 November 1931) was a Finnish journalist and politician. He was a Member of the Parliament of Finland from 1908 to 1910 and again from 1911 to 1918, representing the Social Democratic Party of Finland (SDP). During the 1918 Finnish Civil War Huotari was a member of the Central Workers' Council of Finland. After the war he was in prison until 1922.
