= Valdemar Sandelin =

Finnish politician (1917–1990)

Valdemar Edmund Sandelin (17 February 1917 – 28 August 1990) was a Finnish politician, born in Tampere. He was a member of the Parliament of Finland from 1962 to 1973, representing the Social Democratic Party of Finland (SDP). He was the governor of Häme Province from 1973 to 1979. He was a presidential elector in the 1968 Finnish presidential election.
