= Sulo Aittoniemi =

Finnish politician (1936–2016)

Sulo Aittoniemi (11 July 1936 – 16 June 2016) was a Finnish politician who was an MP between 1987 and 2003.
