= Pekka Haarla =

Finnish business executive and politician (1923–2021)

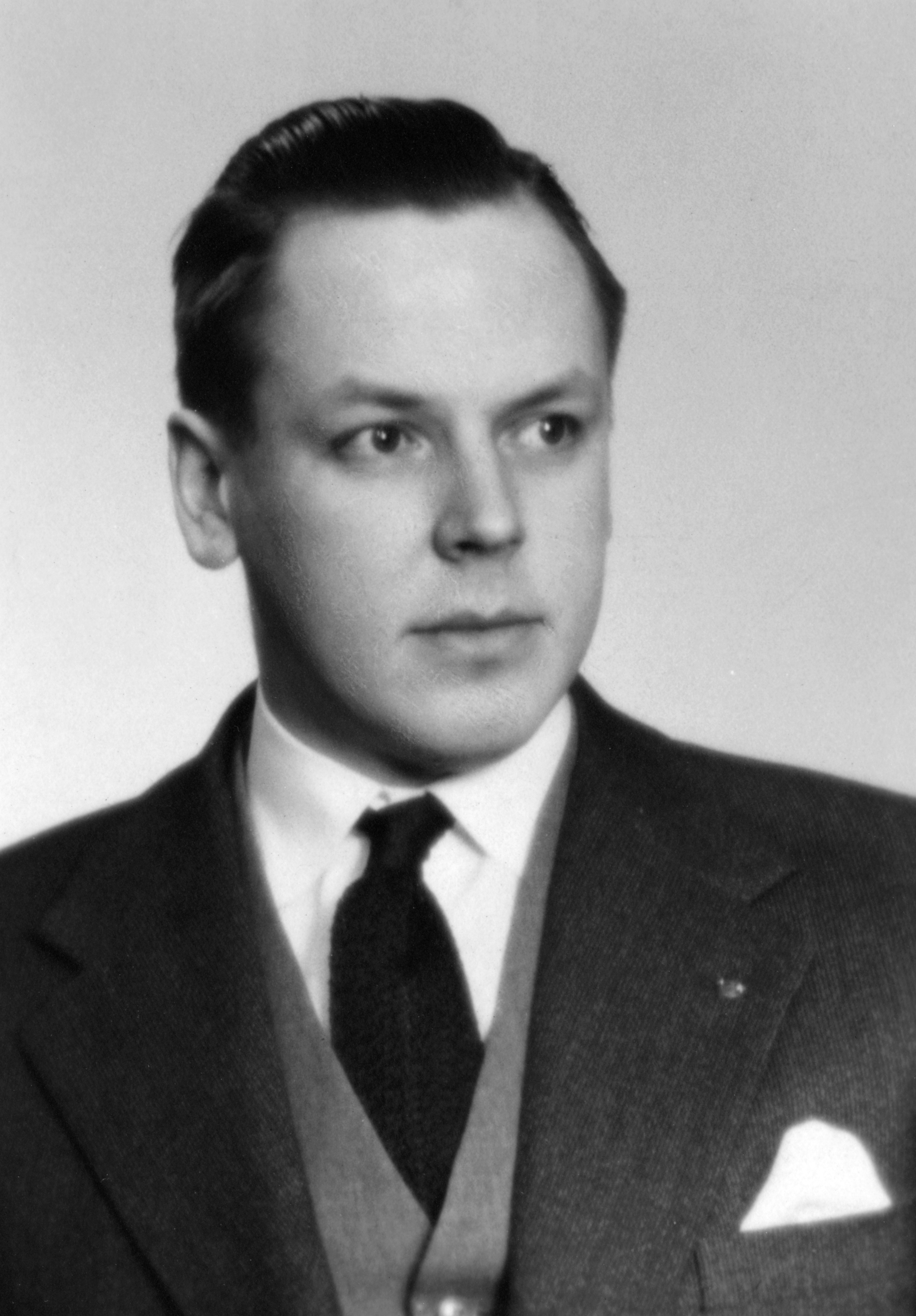
Pekka Haarla

Pekka Rafael (Pekka R.) Haarla (3 May 1923 – 29 August 2021) was a Finnish business executive and politician, born in Tampere. He was a member of the Parliament of Finland from 1966 to 1972, representing the National Coalition Party. He was a presidential elector in the 1968 Finnish presidential election.
