= Anni Flinck =

Finnish politician (1915–1990)

Anna (Anni) Maria Flinck (24 July 1915, Tampere – 23 June 1990) was a Finnish politician. She was a member of the Parliament of Finland from 1954 to 1975, representing the Social Democratic Party of Finland (SDP).
