= Kari Kantalainen =

Finnish politician

Kari Sakari Kantalainen (born 14 January 1947) is a Finnish business executive and politician. He was born in Valkeakoski, and was a member of the Parliament of Finland from 1995 to 2003, representing the National Coalition Party.
