= Kalle Kaakko-oja =

Finnish politician

Kalle Kaakko-oja (1 February 1875, Kuru - 7 May 1942) was a Finnish politician. He was a member of the Parliament of Finland from 1910 to 1913, representing the Finnish Party.
