= Juho Lehmus =

Finnish politician

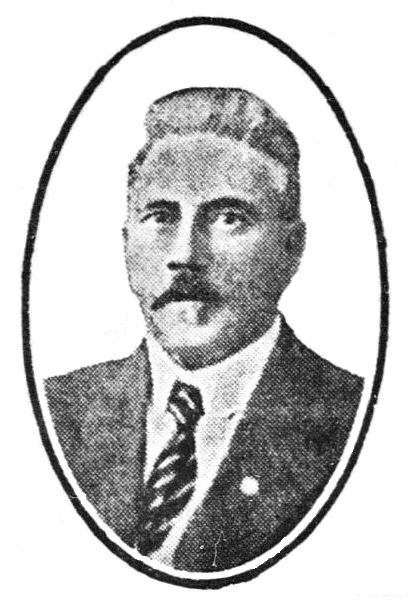
Member of the Parliament of Finland Juho Lehmus (1858-1918).

Johannes (Juho) Lehmus (19 December 1858 - 6 April 1918; original surname Lindgren) was a Finnish shoemaker, smallholder and politician. He was a member of the Parliament of Finland from 1916 until his death in 1918, representing the Social Democratic Party of Finland (SDP). Lehmus was born in Orivesi. During the Finnish Civil War, he sided with the Reds, was taken prisoner by White troops and was shot in Tampere on 6 April 1918.
