= Heimo Rekonen =

Finnish politician (1920–1997)

Heimo Nestori Rekonen (8 August 1920, Lestijärvi – 24 November 1997) was a Finnish politician. He was a member of the Parliament of Finland from 1970 to 1979, representing the Finnish People's Democratic League (SKDL).
