= Leo Suonpää =

Finnish politician (1911–1996)

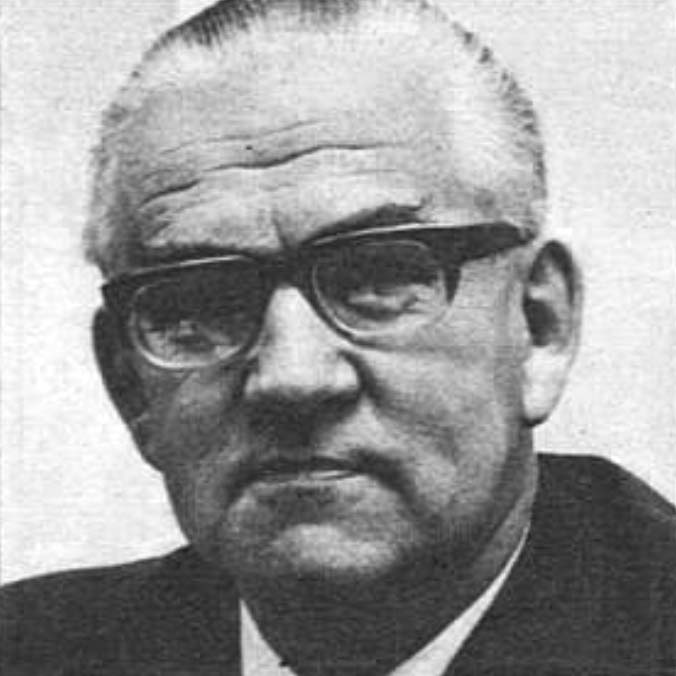
Leo Suonpää

Leo Evald Suonpää (15 June 1911 – 12 March 1996) was a Finnish politician, born in Oulu. He was a member of the Parliament of Finland from 1958 to 1970, representing the Finnish People's Democratic League (SKDL). He served as Minister of Transport and Public Works from 27 May 1966 to 22 March 1968. He was a presidential elector in the 1956, 1962 and 1968 presidential elections. He was later active in the Democratic Alternative (DEVA). Suonpää was a member of the Communist Party of Finland (SKP). As he had joined the Communist Party at a time when it was still illegal in Finland, he was imprisoned on sedition charges from 1934 to 1936.
