= Pauli Tuorila =

Finnish chemist and politician (1900–1950)

Paul (Pauli) Vihtori Tuorila (21 November 1900 – 10 September 1950) was a Finnish chemist and politician, born in Turku. He was a member of the Parliament of Finland from 1936 to 1939, representing the Patriotic People's Movement (IKL). He was a presidential elector in the 1937, 1940 and 1943 presidential elections.
