= Tellervo M. Koivisto =

Finnish politician (1927–1982)

Tellervo Maria Koivisto (née Heino; 29 August 1927, in Messukylä – 6 March 1982) was a Finnish teacher and politician. She was a member of the Parliament of Finland from 1970 until her death in 1982, representing the Social Democratic Party of Finland (SDP). She belonged to the left wing of the SDP. She was usually referred to as Tellervo M. Koivisto, the middle initial serving to differentiate between her and Tellervo Koivisto (née Kankaanranta), the wife of Mauno Koivisto.
