= Mikko Asunta =

Finnish farmer and politician (1911–2005)

Mikko Pellervo Asunta (12 August 1911 – 1 April 2005) was a Finnish farmer and politician, born in Ruovesi. He was a member of the Parliament of Finland from 1958 to 1970 and from 1972 to 1979, representing the National Coalition Party. He was a presidential elector in the 1956, 1962 and 1968 presidential elections.
