= Pauli Kiuru =

Finnish triathlete, businessman and politician

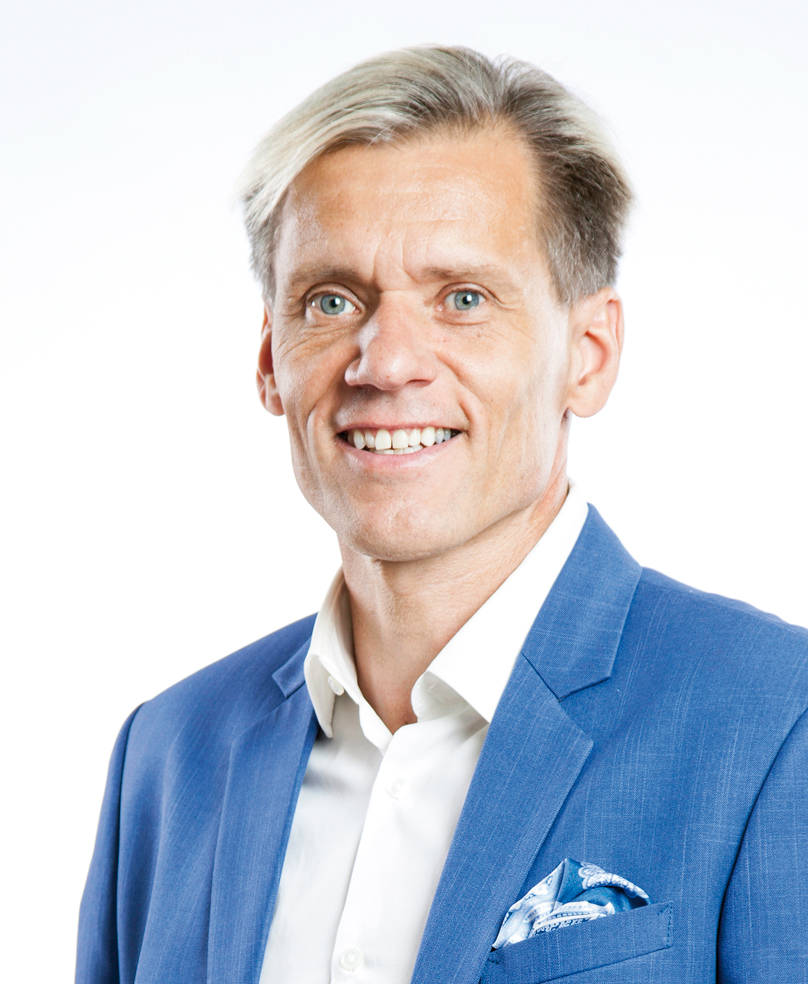
Pauli Antero Kiuru

Pauli Antero Kiuru (born 8 December 1962 in Valkeakoski) is a Finnish triathlete, businessman and politician. He is a member of the Parliament of Finland since 2011, representing the National Coalition Party.

He has been on the podium of the Ironman World Championship race three times; He was third in years 1990 and 1992, and second in year 1993.
