= Antti Linna =

Finnish engineer and politician

Antti Emil Linna (7 October 1916 - 17 January 2000) was a Finnish engineer and politician. He was at first active in the National Progressive Party. He was a member of the Parliament of Finland, representing the People's Party of Finland from 1962 to 1965 and the Liberal People's Party from 1965 to 1966. He was born in Messukylä, the son of Eemil Linna.
