= Sulo Heiniö =

Finnish engineer and politician (1888–1956)

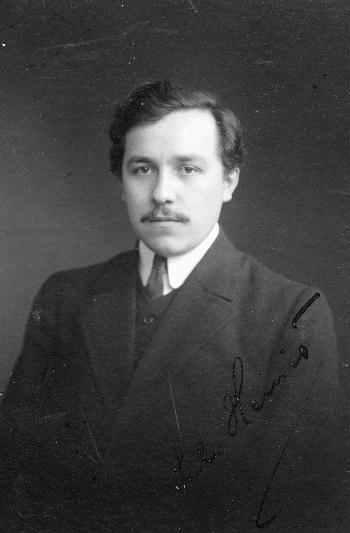
Sulo Heiniö in 1913

Sulo Aukusti Heiniö (7 January 1888 – 10 February 1956; surname until 1905 Helldán) was a Finnish engineer and politician, born in Tampere. He was a member of the Parliament of Finland from 1933 to 1936 and from 1939 to 1948, representing the National Progressive Party. He was a presidential elector in the 1931 Finnish presidential election.
