= Emil Viljanen =

Finnish politician

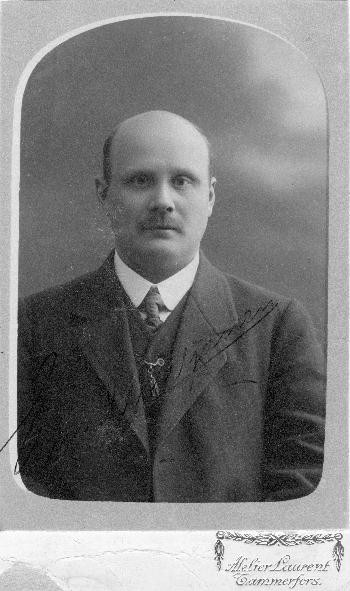
Emil Viljanen in the 1910s

Emil Viljanen (10 August 1874 - 20 January 1954) was a Finnish civil servant and politician, born in Mouhijärvi. He was a member of the Parliament of Finland from 1913 to 1916 and again from 1919 to 1922, representing the Social Democratic Party of Finland (SDP).
