= Heikki Häyrynen =

Finnish saddlemaker and politician (1875–1915)

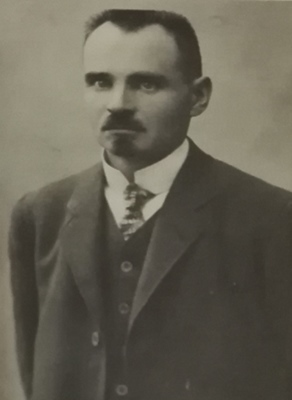
Heikki Häyrynen

Verner Henrik (Heikki) Häyrynen (24 December 1875 – 20 October 1915) was a Finnish saddlemaker and politician, born in Jämsä. He was a member of the Parliament of Finland from 1907 to 1908 and from 1909 until his death in 1915, representing the Social Democratic Party of Finland (SDP).
