= Jukka Pohjola =

Finnish politician

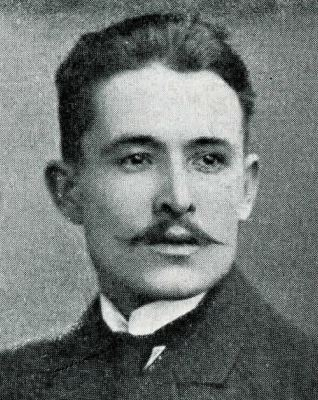
Image of Jukka Pohjola

Jukka Pohjola (19 November 1878, Kangasala – 8 November 1948) was a Finnish smallholder, journalist and politician. He was a Member of the Parliament of Finland from 1909 to 1913 and again from 1916 to 1917, representing the Social Democratic Party of Finland (SDP). Pohjola sided with the Reds during the Finnish Civil War of 1918. After the defeat of the Red side, Pohjola fled to Soviet Russia. He returned to Finland later and was imprisoned for some time for his role on the defeated side of the Civil War.
