= Kalle Häkkinen =

Finnish politician (1878–1919)

Kaarle (Kalle) Fredrik Häkkinen (28 January 1878, in Ruovesi – 25 June 1919) was a Finnish agronomist, farmer, bank director and politician. He was a member of the Diet of Finland from 1904 to 1906.

He was also a member of the Parliament of Finland from 1917 to 1919. He represented the Finnish Party until 1918 and the National Coalition Party from 1918 to 1919.
