= Penna Paunu =

Finnish politician

Juho Benjamin (Penna) Paunu (5 October 1868 in Messukylä – 24 August 1920; surname until 1906 Bastman) was a Finnish cooperative manager and politician. He was a member of the Parliament of Finland from 1907 to 1909, from 1911 to 1916 and from 1919 until his death in 1920, representing the Social Democratic Party of Finland (SDP).
