= Janne Mustonen =

Finnish politician (1901–1964)

Member of the Parliament of Finland
- In office 20 December 1963 – 11 May 1964
- Preceded by: Yrjö Murto
- Succeeded by: Paavo Lagerroos
- Constituency: Oulu Province
- In office 6 April 1945 – 19 February 1962
- Constituency: Oulu Province

Personal details
- Born: Johannes Aadolfinpoika Mustonen; 5 May 1901 Paltamo, Russian Empire
- Died: 11 May 1964 (aged 63) Kajaani, Finland
- Party: Communist Party of Finland
- Other political affiliations: Finnish People's Democratic League

Johannes Aadolfinpoika Mustonen (5 May 1901 – 11 May 1964) was a Finnish politician and member of the Parliament of Finland, the national legislature of Finland. A member of the Communist Party of Finland and the Finnish People's Democratic League, he represented Oulu Province between April 1945 and February 1962 and between December 1963 and May 1964. Prior to being elected, he was imprisoned for eight years for political reasons.

== Early life ==
Mustonen was born on 5 May 1901 in Paltamo in the centre of the Grand Duchy of Finland. He was the son of crofter Adolf Mustonen and Eva Stiina Kovalainen. He was educated at folk school and Sirola-opisto. He held various jobs including as a paper worker, a sawmill driver and a general labourer. He was forestry worker in Kajaani until 1945.

== Politics ==
Mustonen was active in the socialist youth movement in Kajaani from the early 1920s and contested the 1924 municipal elections. His political activities brought him to the attention of the Etsivä keskuspoliisi (EK) secret police (also known as Ohrana). Towards the end of 1924, the EK searched his home and found maps with strange markings belonging to his brother. The EK believed that this indicated that Mustonen was active in the banned Communist Party of Finland (SKP) but did not take any further action.

Mustonen was arrested by the EK on 17 January 1926. On 8 July 1926 the Court of Appeal in Vaasa convicted Mustonen of preparing for high treason and treason and sentenced him to six and three years imprisonment respectively (to serve eight years) with loss of civic rights for ten years. He was released on parole in 1932.

Mustonen was questioned by the state police (Valpo) just prior to the commencement of the Winter War in 1939 but was released as he seemed to have left his communist activities behind since being released from prison. He was a Class II conscript in the Nostoväki military reserve and thus did not take part in the Winter War. During the Interim Peace he worked for the Finland–Soviet Union Peace and Friendship Society (SNS) in Kainuu. SNS was banned in December 1940 and several of its administrators arrested but not Mustonen.

With the outbreak of the Continuation War in June 1941, Mustonen was amongst hundreds of leftists who were put into preventive detention. He was amongst those political prisoners who were forcibly conscripted into the Detached Battalion 21, a penal battalion also known as Detachment Pärmi, and sent to the front line. He was then sent to the labour camps (Erillinen työkomppania). In the spring of 1940 Mustonen's wife requested that he be released but this was opposed by Valpo and the company operating the labour camps for the Finnish regime. However, Valpo subsequently changed its stance and supported his release which happened in autumn 1943.

Mustonen was elected to the Parliament of Finland at the 1945 parliamentary election. He was re-elected at the 1948, 1951, 1954 and 1958 parliamentary elections. He was not re-elected at the 1962 parliamentary election but was appointed to the Parliament of Finland in December 1963 following the death of Yrjö Murto.

Mustonen was secretary of the Kainuu branch of the SKP and chairman of the Kainuu branch of the Finnish People's Democratic League (SKDL). He was a presidential elector at the 1950, 1956 and 1962 presidential elections. He was a member of the municipal council in Kajaani.

Mustonen died on 11 May 1964 in Kajaani.

== Personal life ==
Mustonen married Anna Maria Leinonen in 1938.

== See also ==
- List of Finnish MPs imprisoned for political reasons
