= Elli Stenberg =

Finnish politician (1903–1987)

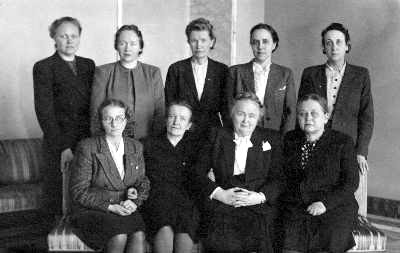
- Stenberg (back row, centre) with other female SKDL MPs

Member of the Parliament of Finland
- In office 6 April 1945 – 4 April 1966
- Constituency: Häme Province North

Personal details
- Born: Ellen Aleksandra Stenberg; 17 March 1903 Tampere, Grand Duchy of Finland, Russian Empire
- Died: 6 July 1987 (aged 84)
- Party: Communist Party of Finland
- Other political affiliations: Finnish People's Democratic League
- Education: Communist University of the National Minorities of the West

Ellen Aleksandra Stenberg (17 March 1903 – 6 July 1987) was a Finnish politician and member of the Parliament of Finland, the national legislature of Finland. A member of the Communist Party of Finland (SKP) and the Finnish People's Democratic League (SKDL), she represented Häme Province North between April 1945 and April 1966. Prior to being elected, she was imprisoned for twelve years for political reasons.

== Early life ==
Stenberg was born on 17 March 1903 in Tampere in the south-west of the Grand Duchy of Finland. She was the daughter of coachman Frans Oskar Stenberg and seamstress Hilma Aleksandra Pataniitty. She attended folk school and evening vocational school (1920-1922). She studied at the Communist University of the National Minorities of the West in Leningrad from 1924 to 1928.

Stenberg started working in 1915 when she was still a child. She was a milliner and fur worker in Tampere from 1917 to 1924. Later she was a teacher in Gatchina in the Soviet Union from 1928 to 1929.

== Politics and imprisonment ==
As a child Stenberg joined Ihanneliitto, a social democratic youth organisation. During the Finnish Civil War in 1918 she served as a messenger for the Reds. She joined the Communist Party of Finland (SKP) in 1921 and was the party's women organiser in Helsinki from 1929 to 1930.

Following the introduction of anti-communist laws in 1930, Stenberg was amongst thousands of leftists imprisoned by the government. The Etsivä keskuspoliisi (EK) secret police (also known as Ohrana) was brutal in its suppression of communism and torture was routine during interrogation. During interrogation Stenberg's interrogator Iso-Mäkelä grabbed her by the hair and threw her to the floor; a lock of hair was left in the interrogator's hand. On 19 December 1930 the Court of Appeal in Vaasa convicted Stenberg of preparing for high treason and sentenced her to six years imprisonment with loss of civic rights for ten years. She and other female political prisoners were kept in harsh conditions at Häme Castle. She was released on parole on 20 December 1936.

After being released, Stenberg was a fur worker in Helsinki from 1937 to 1939. On 9 June 1939 the Court of Appeal in Turku convicted Stenberg of preparing for high treason for a second time and sentenced her to four years imprisonment with loss of civic rights for a further ten years. She was given an additional six-month sentence for violating her parole. Following the defeat of the Finnish fascists by the Allies in 1944, the SKP was legalised and all political prisoners released in accordance with the Moscow Armistice. Stenberg was released in September 1944 and her civic rights restored.

== Return to politics ==
Stenberg was a member of the central committees of the SKP and president of the Tampere branch of the SKP. She was committee member of the Finnish Women's Democratic Union (Suomen Naisten Demokraattinen Liitto). She was elected to the Parliament of Finland at the 1945 parliamentary election. She was re-elected at the 1948, 1951, 1954, 1958 and 1962 parliamentary elections. She was a presidential elector at the 1950, 1956 and 1962 presidential elections.

Stenberg died on 6 July 1987.

== Works ==
- Yrjö Sirola : muistelmia suomalaisesta demokratian esitaistelijasta. Kansankulttuuri. 1946.
- Huomenen tiellä : Suomen työläisnaisliikkeen 60-vuotisjuhlakirja. Suomen naisten demokraattinen liitto. 1960.

== See also ==
- List of Finnish MPs imprisoned for political reasons
