= 1958 Finnish parliamentary election =

General election

← 1954	6–7 July 1958	1962 →

All 200 seats in Parliament 101 seats needed for a majority
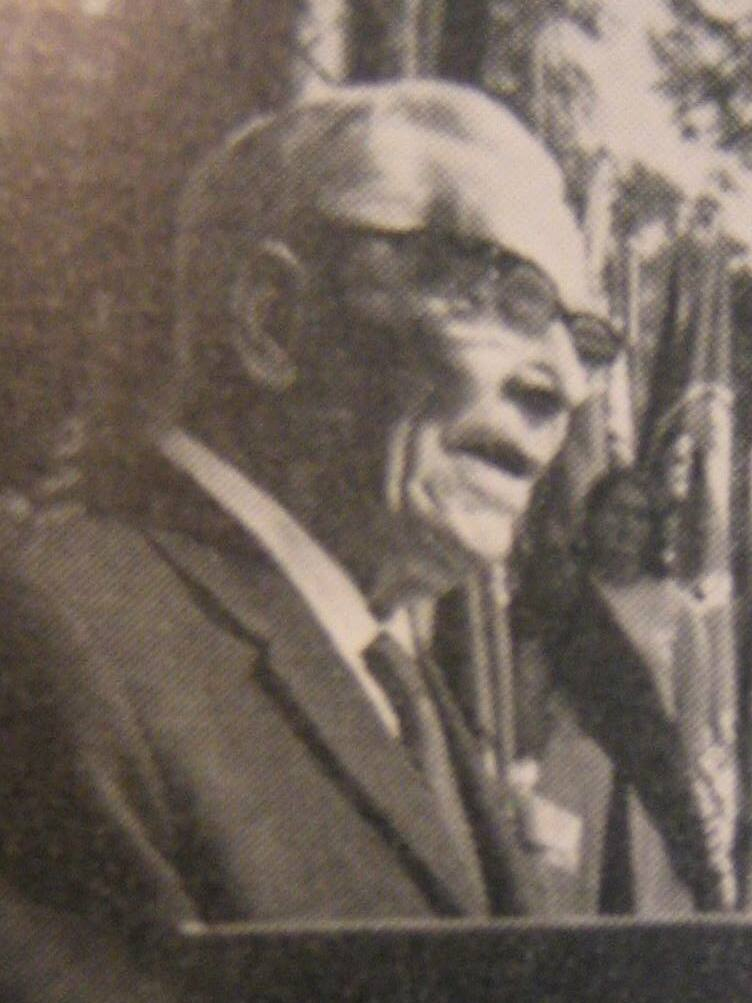

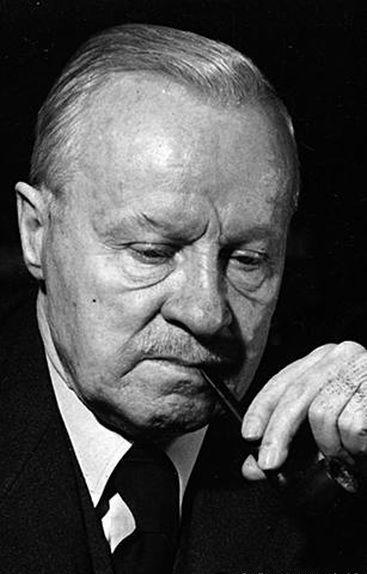

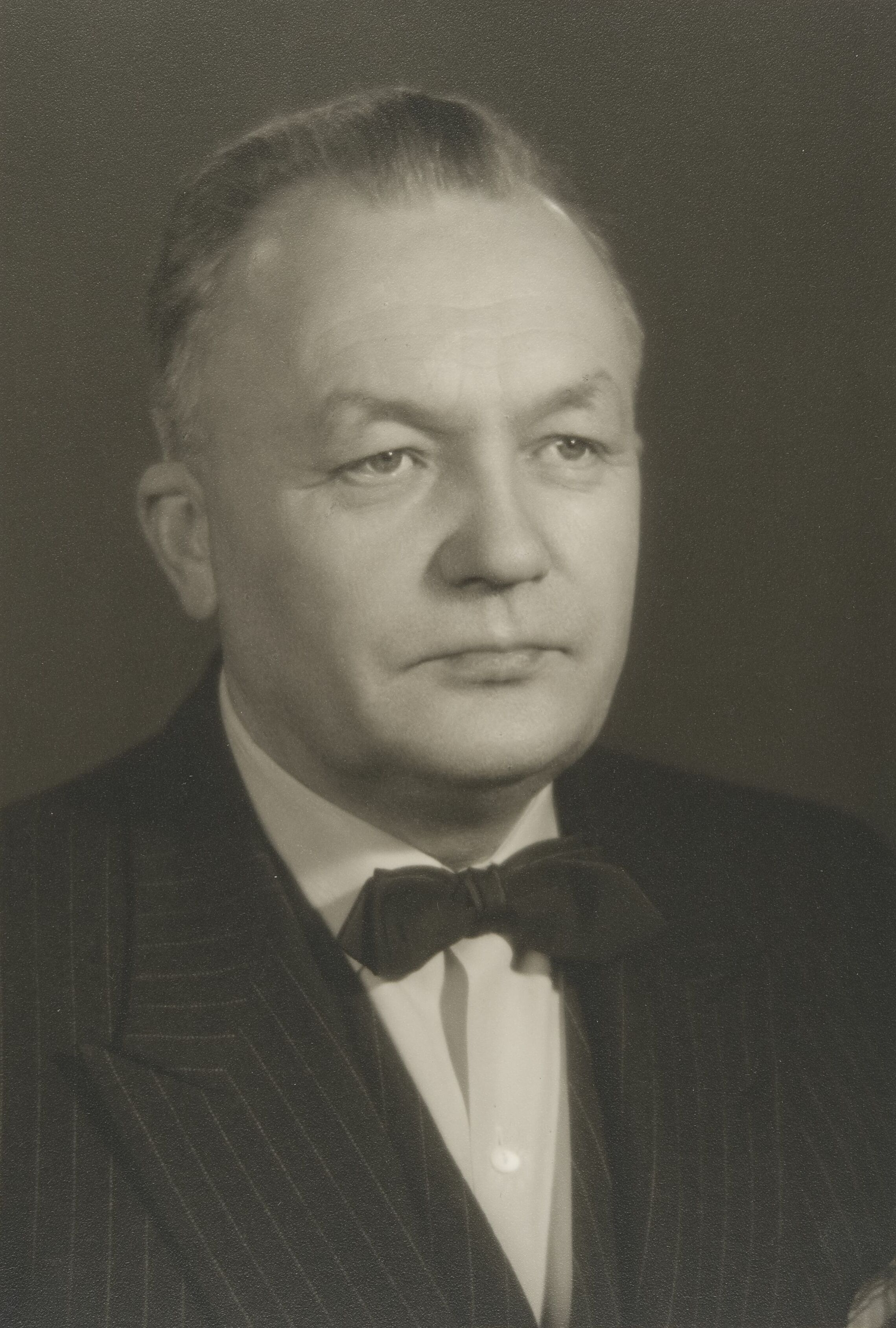

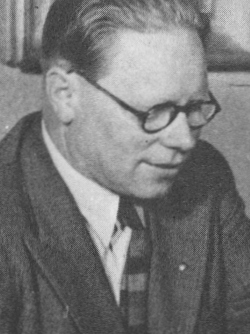

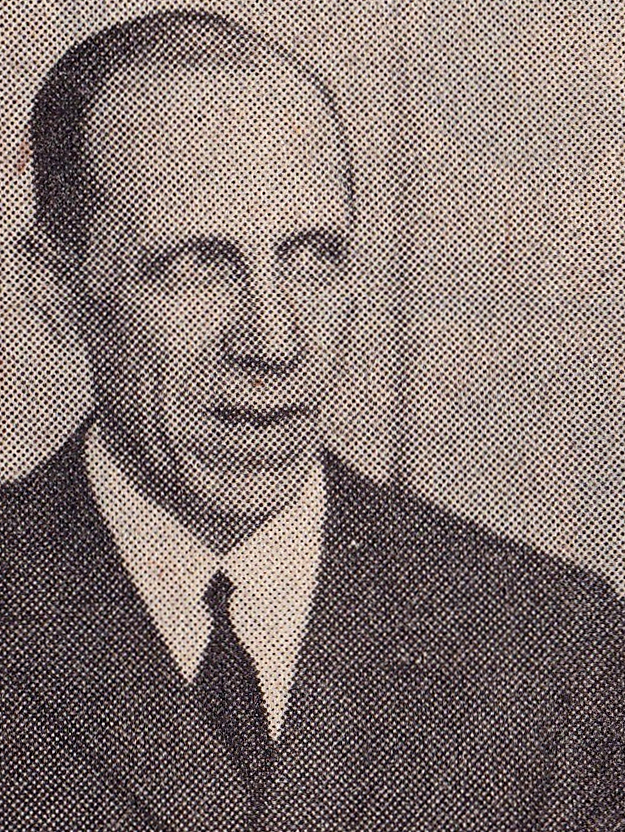

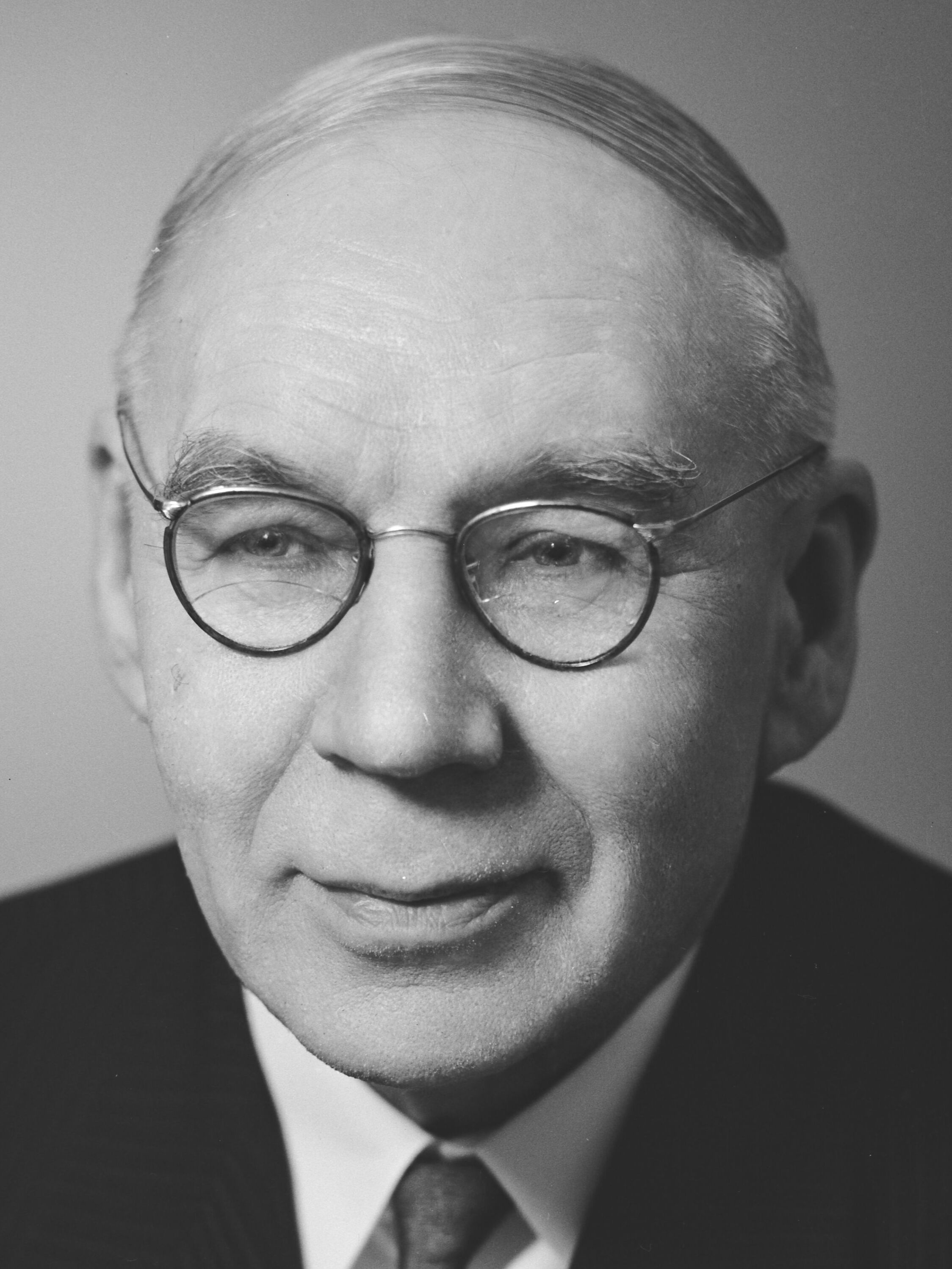

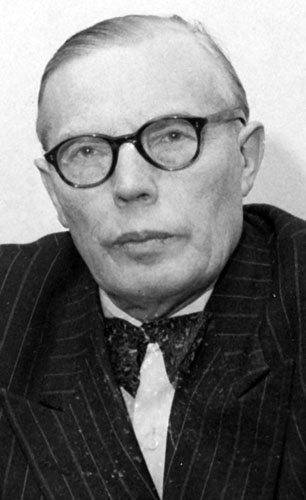
	First party	Second party	Third party
Leader	Kusti Kulo	Väinö Tanner	V. J. Sukselainen
Party	SKDL	SDP	Agrarian
Last election	21.57%, 43 seats	26.25%, 54 seats	24.10%, 53 seats
Seats won	50	48	48
Seat change	▲7	▼6	▼5
Popular vote	450,220	449,536	448,364
Percentage	23.16%	23.12%	23.06%
Swing	▲1.59pp	▼3.13pp	▲1.04pp
	Fourth party	Fifth party	Sixth party
Leader	Jussi Saukkonen	Lars Erik Taxell	Eino Saari
Party	National Coalition	RKP	People's
Last election	12.80%, 24 seats	6.76%, 12 seats	7.88%, 13 seats
Seats won	29	13	8
Seat change	▲5	▲1	▼5
Popular vote	297,094	126,365	114,617
Percentage	15.28%	6.50%	5.90%
Swing	▲2.48pp	▼0.26pp	▼1.98pp
	Seventh party	Eighth party
Leader	Emil Skog
Party	TPSL	ÅS
Last election	–	0.23%, 1 seat
Seats won	3	1
Seat change	New	Steady
Popular vote	33,947	5,487
Percentage	1.75%	0.28%
Swing	New	▲0.05pp
Prime Minister before election
Reino Kuuskoski
Independent
Prime Minister after election
Karl-August Fagerholm
SDP

Parliamentary elections were held in Finland on 6 and 7 July 1958. The Finnish People's Democratic League, which was dominated by the Communist Party of Finland, emerged as the largest party, but was unable to form a government.

== Background ==
Between March 1956, when Urho Kekkonen (Agrarian League) became president, and the 1958 elections, Finland had had four governments; Karl-August Fagerholm's Social Democratic Party majority government, V. J. Sukselainen's Agrarian minority government, and two civil-service caretaker governments, led by the Governor of the Bank of Finland, Rainer von Fieandt and the Chief Justice of Finland's Supreme Administrative Court, Reino Kuuskoski. The Social Democrats and Agrarians found it difficult to work together in the government, which significantly reduced Finland's chances of having a stable government, because the two other large or fairly large parties, the Finnish People's Democratic League and National Coalition Party, were excluded from the government.

The Social Democrats had been split into two parties since Väinö Tanner, a veteran Social Democrat and a former political prisoner (one of the eight "war culprits" after World War II), had very narrowly been elected the Social Democratic leader over Fagerholm in July 1957. The Social Democrats were among Kekkonen's chief opponents and wanted to defeat him in the 1962 presidential elections. After becoming president, Kekkonen wanted to defeat the Social Democrats politically, and thus their split into the majority and the minority, the so-called Skogists (after former Defence Minister Emil Skog) helped him move closer towards that goal.

In addition, Finland was suffering from a recession and, by that time's standards, a high unemployment rate, which helped the Finnish People's Democratic League to increase their support. After these elections, Fagerholm formed his third government, which included the Social Democrats, Agrarians, National Coalitioners, Swedish People's Party and the People's Party of Finland, in August 1958. Already when he appointed Fagerholm's government, President Kekkonen indicated that he would not help if it encountered problems. Soon, the government ran into difficulties: the Soviet Union interrupted its trade negotiations with Finland, and in November or December 1958, the Soviet ambassador to Finland returned to the Soviet Union. These "night frosts," along with President Kekkonen's and the other Agrarians' opposition (Foreign Minister Virolainen resigned from the government at the beginning of December 1958, and former Assistant Finance Minister Karjalainen wrote that it was time for the wise people to leave the government), caused Fagerholm to tender his resignation in December 1958. Sukselainen formed another centrist minority government in January 1959, while Kekkonen visited the Soviet Union where the Soviet leader Khrushchev assured him that all was again well in the Finnish-Soviet relations.

== Results ==
Party	Votes	%	Seats	+/–
Finnish People's Democratic League	450,220	23.16	50	+7
Social Democratic Party	449,536	23.12	48	–6
Agrarian League	448,364	23.06	48	–5
National Coalition Party	297,094	15.28	29	+5
Swedish People's Party	126,365	6.50	13	+1
People's Party	114,617	5.90	8	–5
Social Democratic Union of Workers and Smallholders	33,947	1.75	3	New
Liberal League	6,424	0.33	0	0
Åland Coalition	5,487	0.28	1	0
Agrarian League Opposition	5,057	0.26	0	New
Finnish Christian League	3,358	0.17	0	New
Free Citizens and Centre List	3,033	0.16	0	New
Free Economy List	331	0.02	0	New
People's Co-operation League	160	0.01	0	New
Others	242	0.01	0	–
Total	1,944,235	100.00	200	0
Valid votes	1,944,235	99.48		
Invalid/blank votes	10,162	0.52		
Total votes	1,954,397	100.00		
Registered voters/turnout	2,606,258	74.99		
Source: Tilastokeskus 2004, Suomen virallinen tilasto

=== By electoral district ===
Electoral district	Total seats	Seats won							
Electoral district	Total seats	SKDL	SDP	ML	Kok	RKP	SK	TPSL	ÅS
Åland	1								1
Central Finland	12	3	3	4	1		1		
Häme	14	3	4	2	3		1	1	
Helsinki	19	4	4		5	3	2	1	
Kymi	15	2	5	4	3		1		
Lapland	9	4	1	3	1				
North Karelia	11	2	4	4	1				
North Savo	12	4	2	5	1				
North Vaasa	8	1	1	3	1	2			
Oulu	18	7	2	7	1		1		
Pirkanmaa	13	5	3	1	3			1	
Satakunta	14	4	4	3	3				
South Savo	12	1	5	5	1				
South Vaasa	10	2	1	2	2	3			
Uusimaa	16	3	5	2	1	4	1		
Varsinais-Suomi	16	5	4	3	2	1	1		
Total	200	50	48	48	29	13	8	3	1
Source: Statistics Finland
