= Veikko I. Rytkönen =

Finnish politician (1924–1990)

Veikko Ilmari (Veikko I.) Rytkönen (9 May 1924 – 30 October 1990) was a Finnish politician, born in Kiuruvesi. He was a member of the Parliament of Finland from 1962 to 1966, representing the Finnish People's Democratic League (SKDL). He was a presidential elector in the 1962 and 1968 presidential elections.
