= 1954 Finnish parliamentary election =

General election

← 1951	7–8 March 1954	1958 →

All 200 seats in the Parliament of Finland 101 seats needed for a majority
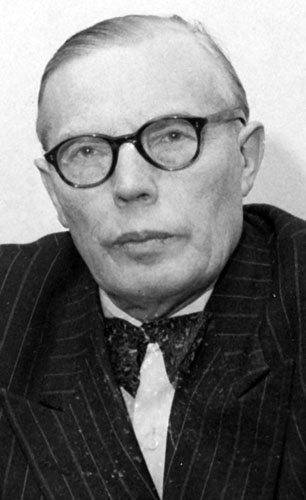

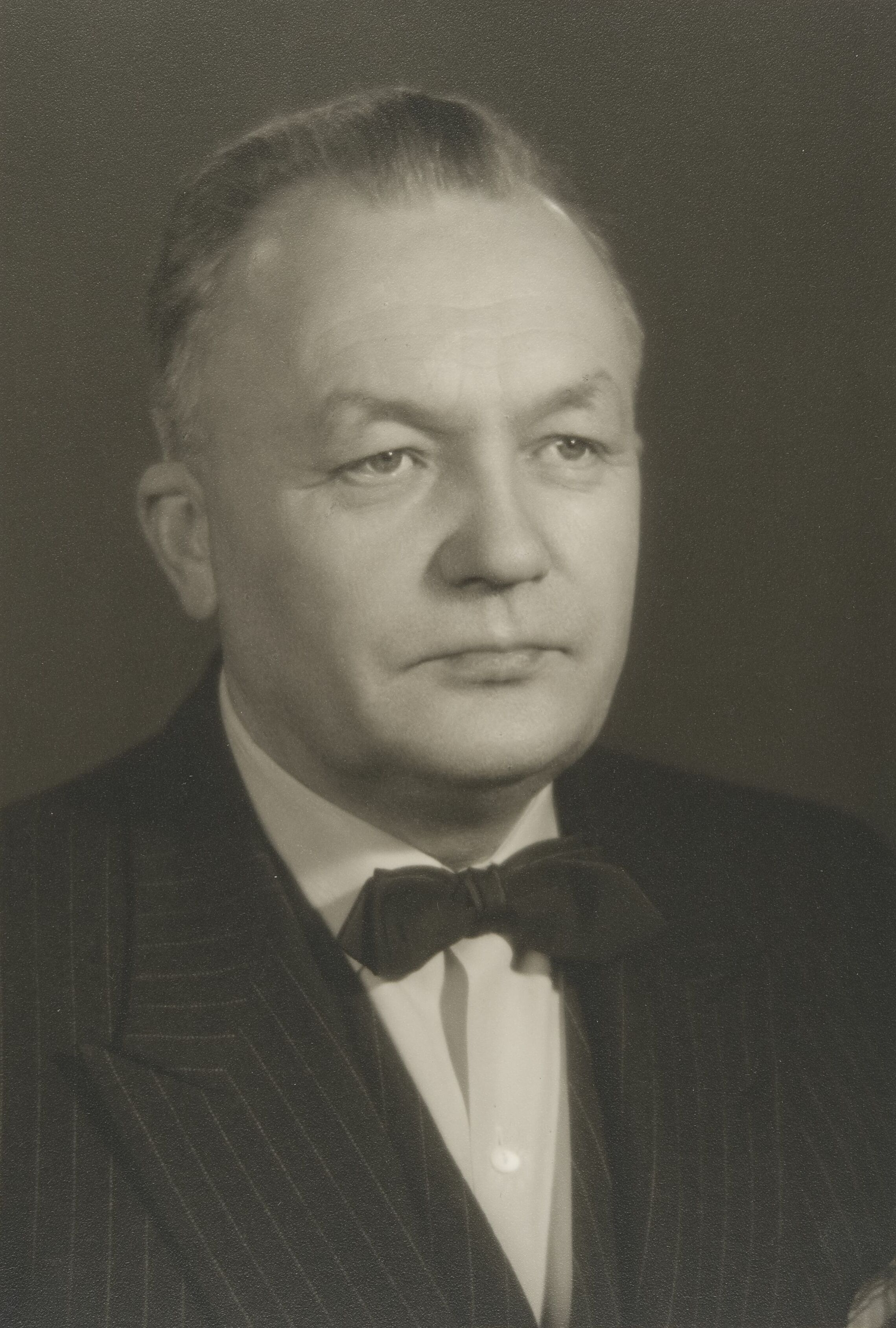

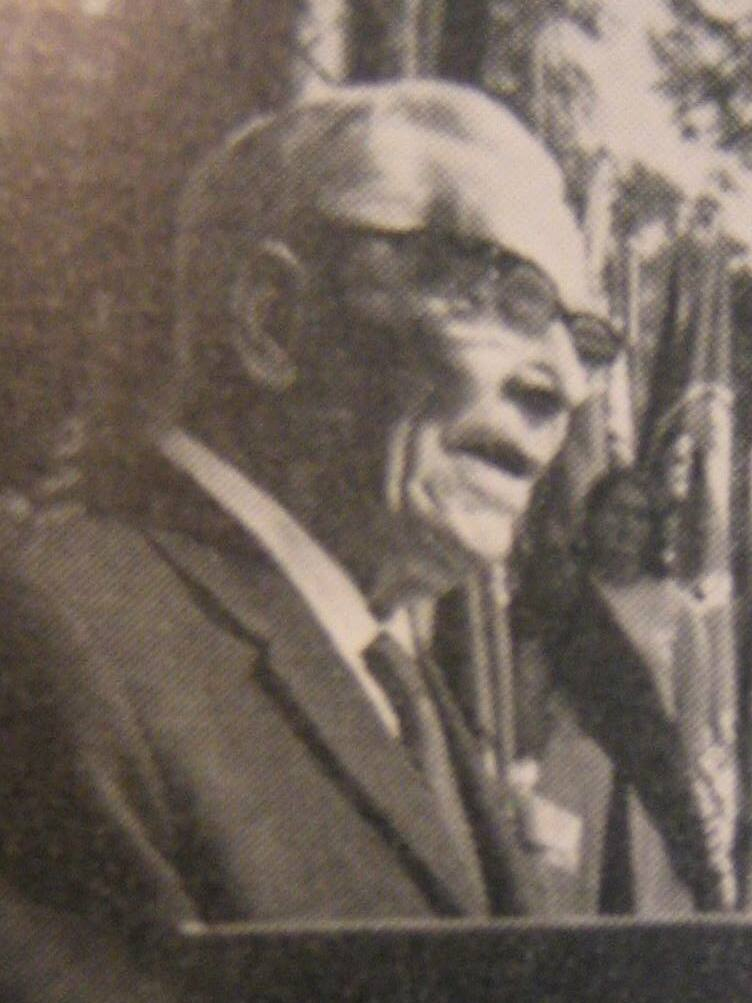

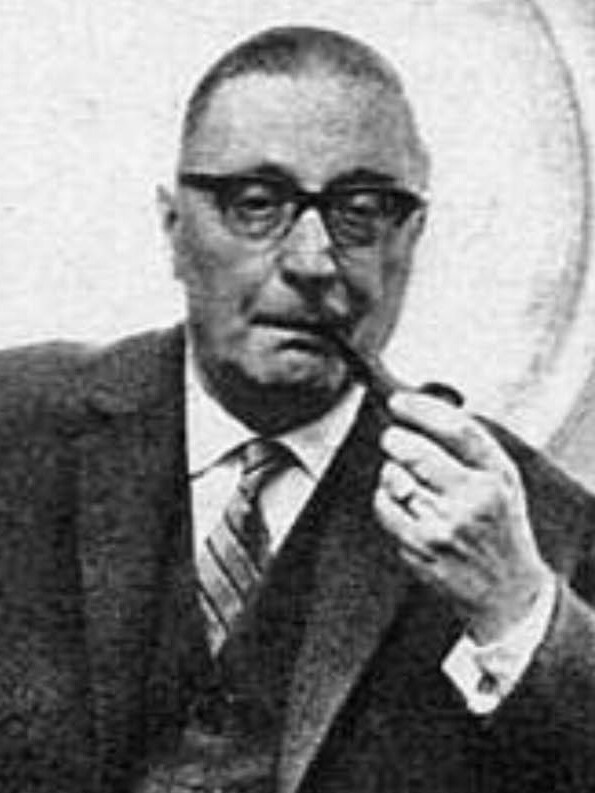

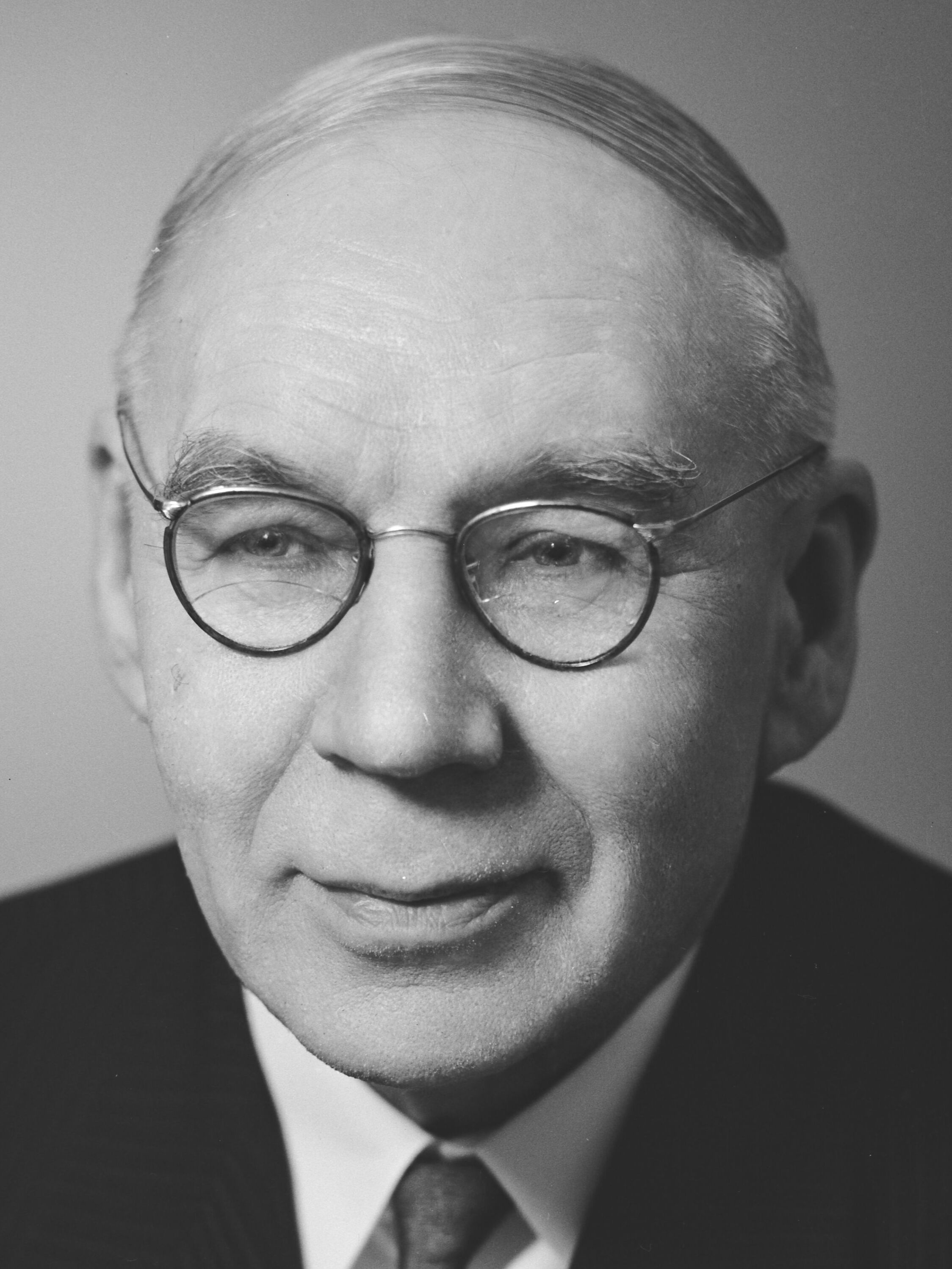

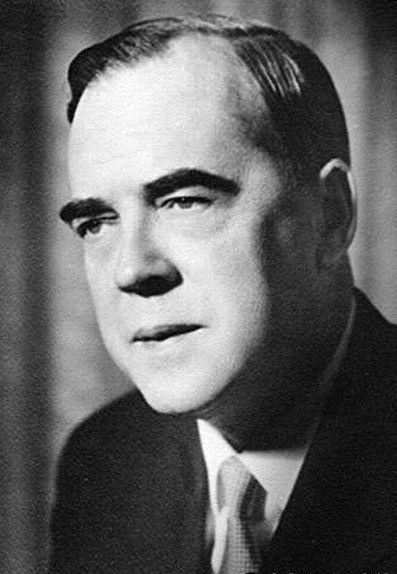
	First party	Second party	Third party
Leader	Emil Skog	V. J. Sukselainen	Kusti Kulo
Party	SDP	Agrarian	SKDL
Last election	26.52%, 53 seats	23.26%, 51 seats	21.58%, 43 seats
Seats won	54	53	43
Seat change	▲1	▲2	Steady
Popular vote	527,094	483,958	433,251
Percentage	26.25%	24.10%	21.57%
Swing	▼0.27pp	▲0.84pp	▼0.01pp
	Fourth party	Fifth party	Sixth party
Leader	Arvo Salminen	Eino Saari	Ralf Törngren
Party	National Coalition	People's	RKP
Last election	14.57%, 28 seats	5.68%, 10 seats	7.27%, 14 seats
Seats won	24	13	12
Seat change	▼4	▲3	▼2
Popular vote	257,025	158,323	135,768
Percentage	12.80%	7.88%	6.76%
Swing	▼1.77pp	▲2.20pp	▼0.51pp
	Seventh party
Party	ÅS
Last election	0.31%, 1 seat
Seats won	1
Seat change	Steady
Popular vote	4,651
Percentage	0.23%
Swing	▼0.08pp
Prime Minister before election
Sakari Tuomioja
Liberal League
Prime Minister after election
Ralf Törngren
RKP

Parliamentary elections were held in Finland on 7 and 8 March 1954.

== Background ==
In June 1953, Prime Minister Urho Kekkonen had presented a simultaneous deflationary program, which tried to lower wages, prices and public expenditures to the level of the export industry's profitability. Among other proposals, the deflationary program aimed to remove the Finnish parents' family allowances for their first children, reduce income, sales and corporate taxes, cut the interest rate, and reduce wages by 10%. Finance Minister Juho Niukkanen (Agrarian League) presented an austerity budget to Parliament in September 1953, which proposed cutting all major government expenditures by 15%. The Social Democratic Party and People's Party of Finland opposed the austerity budget. Since Parliament refused to approve the government's planned changes to the state-subsidized apartment buildings' and other residences' construction, Kekkonen resigned in November 1953. Despite President Juho Kusti Paasikivi's urgings (in his opinion, Kekkonen was a valuable prime minister because he managed Finnish-Soviet relations skilfully), the Social Democrats refused to allow Kekkonen to continue as prime minister.

Sakari Tuomioja, a member of the Liberal League who had earlier served in the government, for example as foreign minister, and had been governor of the Bank of Finland since 1945, formed a centre-right caretaker government. Tuomioja's government wanted to keep rationing wages, but wanted to dismantle other types of rationing. Coffee was released from rationing in March 1954. Finnish exports grew, and the government's expenditures increased by over 20% compared to Kekkonen's fourth government's proposal. Various right-wingers and Social Democrats preferred early elections to boost their number of deputies, and to prevent Kekkonen from becoming prime minister again. Given President Paasikivi's advanced age (83 years) and close relations with Kekkonen, the latter could well succeed Paasikivi as president, should Paasikivi suddenly die or resign.

The Social Democrats went to the election campaign trail with the lofty slogan: "Kekkonen Kampinkadulle" (lit. Kekkonen Back to Camp Street (Kampinkatu), his home of 25 years before his premiership & which was subsequently renamed after him). To their surprise and to that of right-wingers, the Agrarians gained two seats, while the Social Democrats, National Coalition Party and Swedish People's Party suffered a net loss of four seats. Ralf Törngren of the Swedish People's Party formed a centre-left government in May 1954, with Kekkonen as foreign minister. The Central Organisation of Finnish Trade Unions favoured the lowering of living costs, through subsidies, to the start level of the economic stabilization period. The Social Democrats and Agrarians agreed and, dissatisfied with Prime Minister Törngren's economic compromises, caused Törngren to resign and Kekkonen to become prime minister for the fifth time in October 1954.

== Results ==
Party	Votes	%	Seats	+/–
Social Democratic Party	527,094	26.25	54	+1
Agrarian League	483,958	24.10	53	+2
Finnish People's Democratic League	433,251	21.57	43	0
National Coalition Party	257,025	12.80	24	–4
People's Party	158,323	7.88	13	+3
Swedish People's Party	135,768	6.76	12	–2
Liberal League	6,810	0.34	0	0
Åland Coalition	4,651	0.23	1	0
Small Farmers Party	1,040	0.05	0	0
Others	337	0.02	0	–
Total	2,008,257	100.00	200	0
Valid votes	2,008,257	99.47		
Invalid/blank votes	10,785	0.53		
Total votes	2,019,042	100.00		
Registered voters/turnout	2,526,969	79.90		
Source: Tilastokeskus 2004

=== By electoral district ===
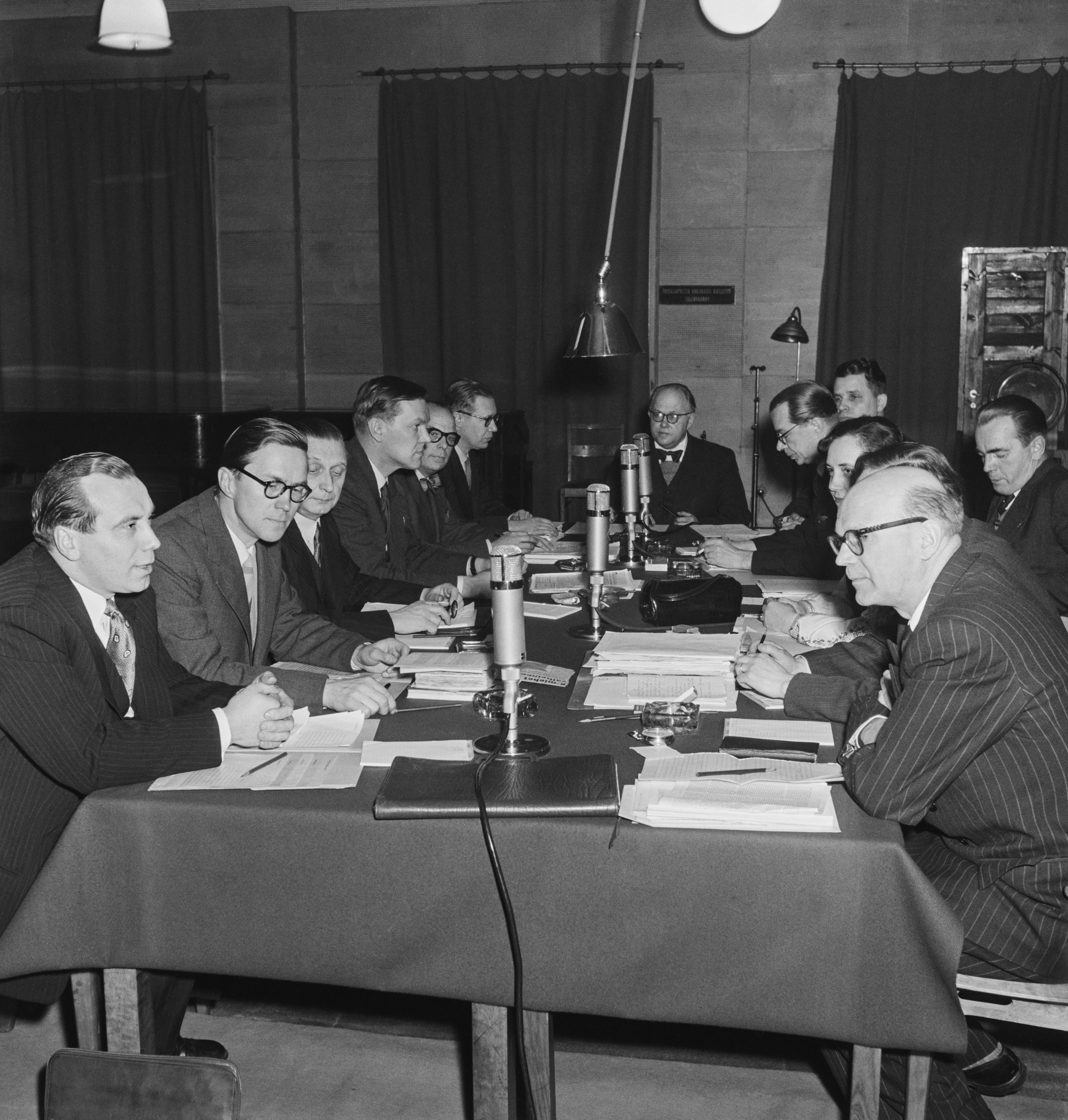
Debaters with their assistants at the Finnish Broadcasting Company's radio studio, sitting around a table for an election debate before the 1954 Finnish parliamentary elections

Electoral district	Total seats	Seats won						
Electoral district	Total seats	SDP	ML	SKDL	Kok	SK	RKP	ÅS
Åland	1							1
Central Finland	12	4	4	2	1	1		
Häme	14	5	3	3	2	1		
Helsinki	19	6		4	3	3	3	
Kymi	15	6	4	2	2	1		
Lapland	9	1	4	3	1			
North Karelia	11	4	4	2	1			
North Savo	13	2	5	4	1	1		
North Vaasa	8	1	3	1	1		2	
Oulu	18	2	8	6	1	1		
Pirkanmaa	13	5	1	4	2	1		
Satakunta	14	4	4	3	3			
South Savo	12	4	5	1	1	1		
South Vaasa	10	1	3	1	2		3	
Uusimaa	15	5	2	3	1	1	3	
Varsinais-Suomi	16	4	3	4	2	2	1	
Total	200	54	53	43	24	13	12	1
Source: Statistics Finland
