= Erkki Paavola =

Finnish journalist and politician (1903–1983)

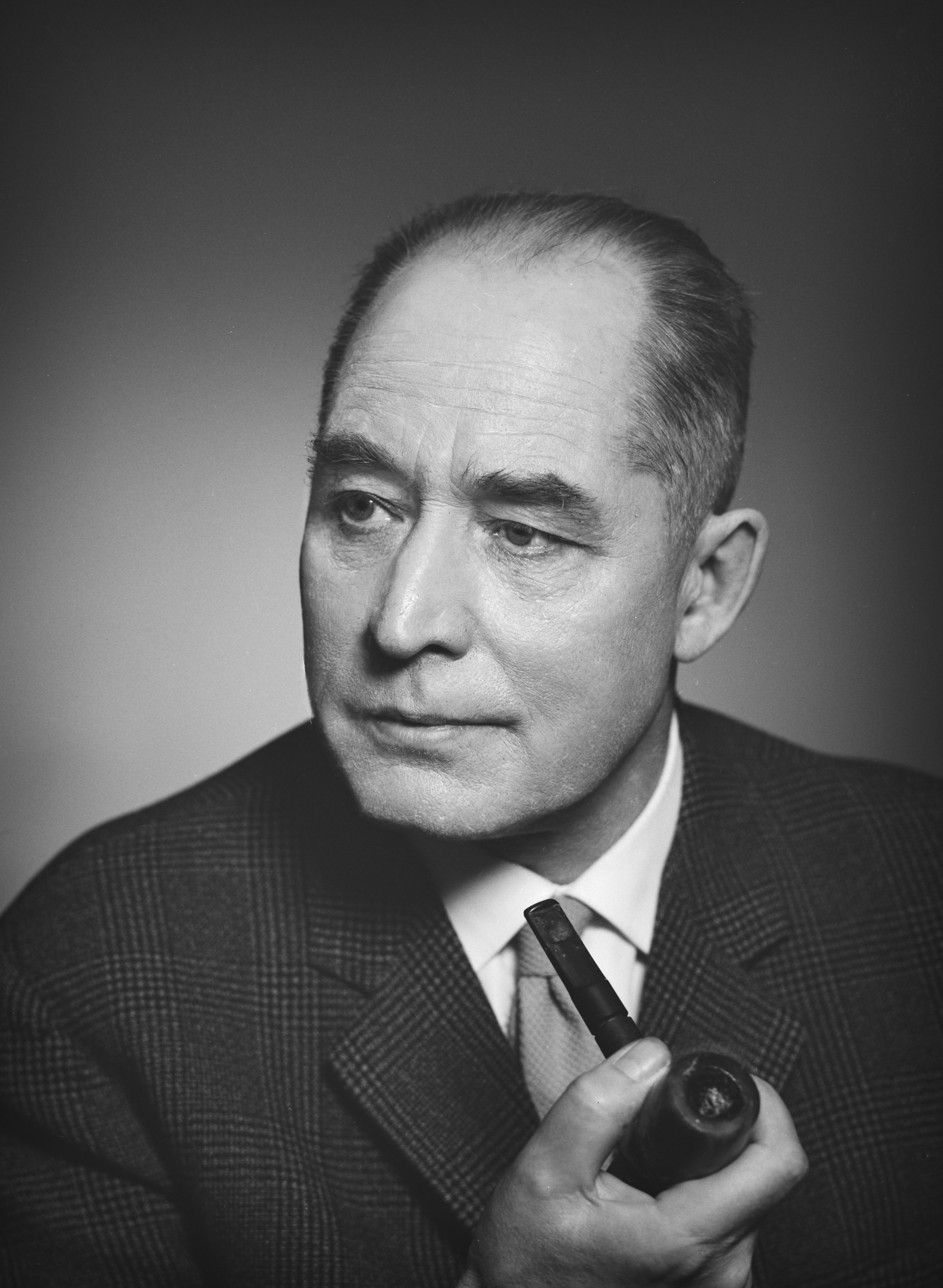
E.J. Paavola in 1962

Erkki Johannes (E. J.) Paavola (17 January 1903 – 21 October 1983) was a Finnish journalist and politician, born in Mouhijärvi. He began his political career in the National Progressive Party. He was a member of the Parliament of Finland from 1962 to 1970, representing the Liberal League until 1965 and the Liberal People's Party (LKP) after that. He was a presidential elector in the 1962 Finnish presidential election.
