= 1951 Finnish parliamentary election =

General election

← 1948	1–2 July 1951	1954 →

All 200 seats in the Parliament of Finland 101 seats needed for a majority
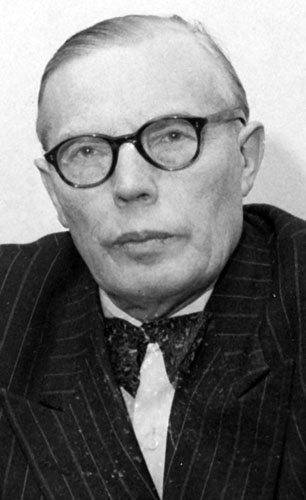

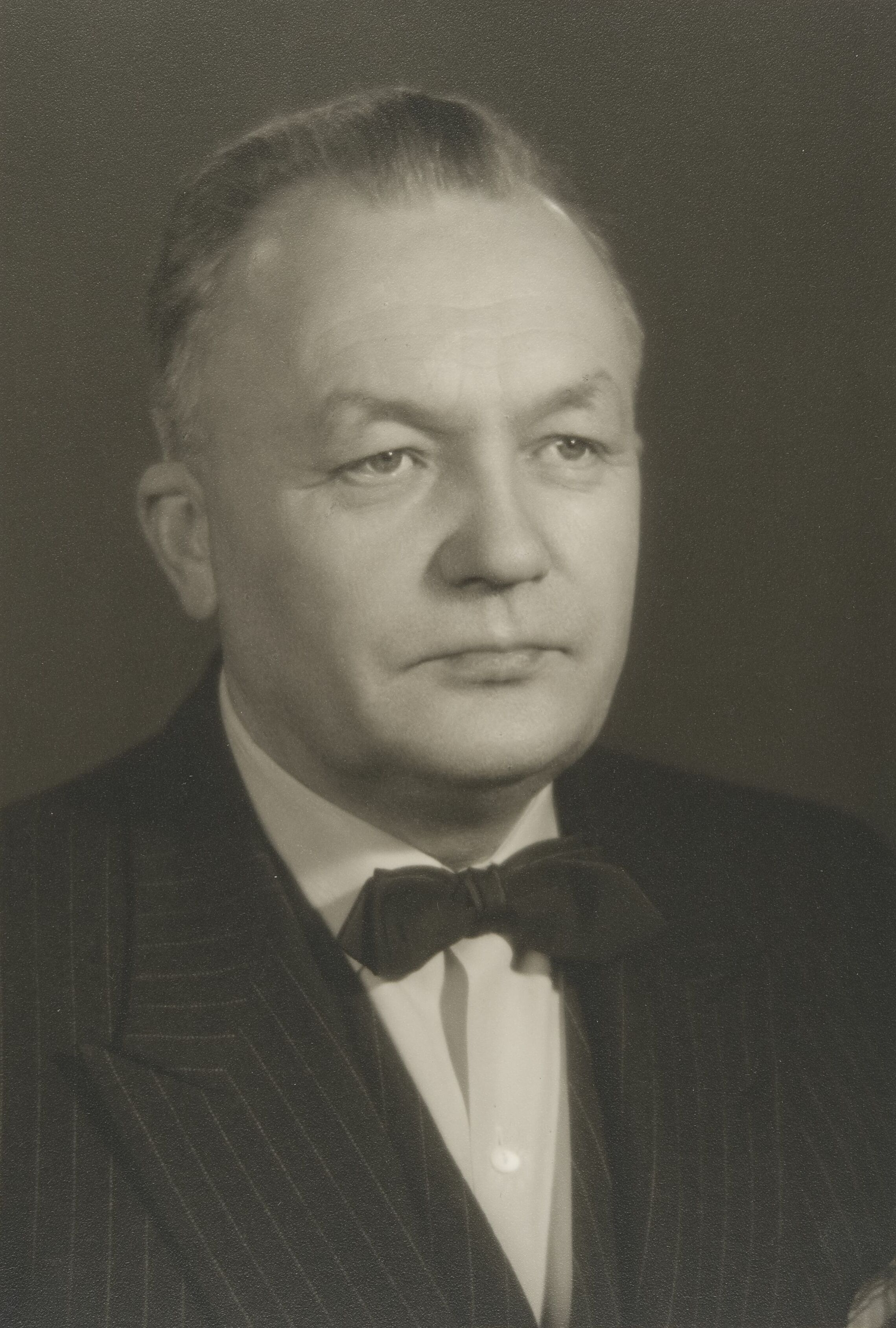

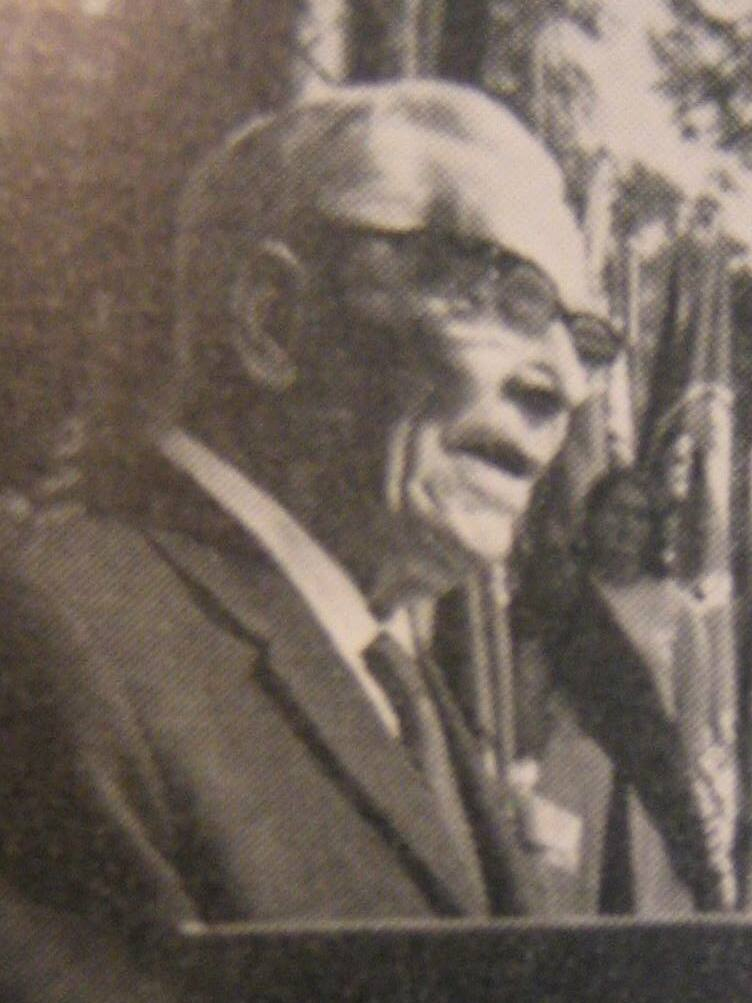

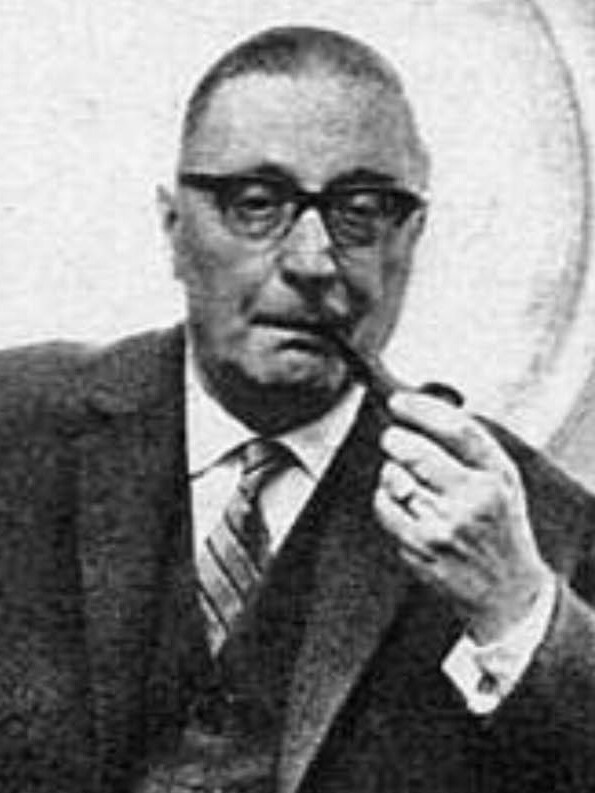

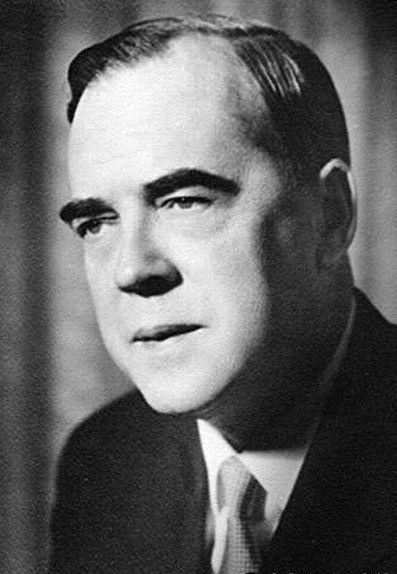

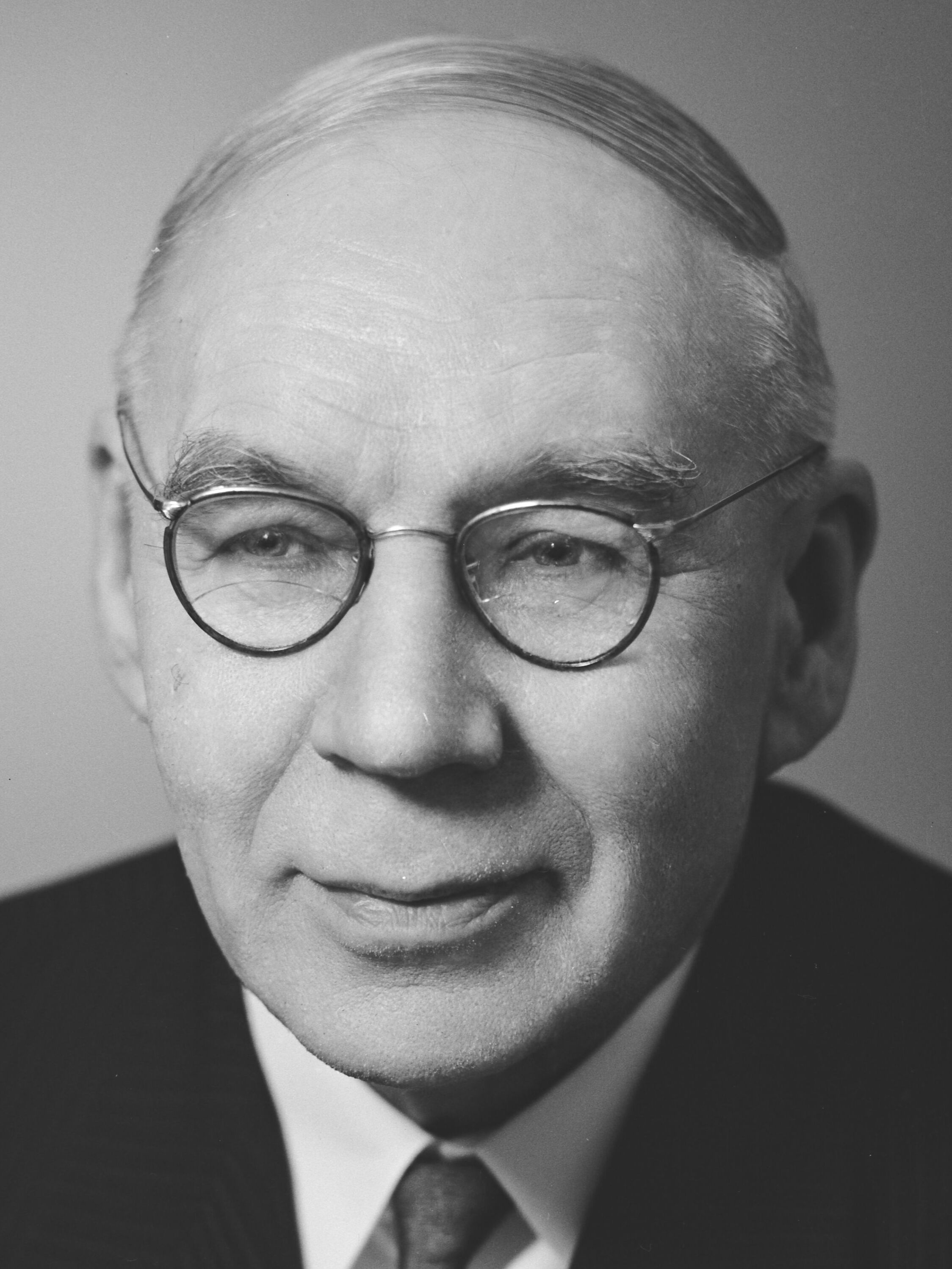
	First party	Second party	Third party
Leader	Emil Skog	V. J. Sukselainen	Kusti Kulo
Party	SDP	Agrarian	SKDL
Last election	26.32%, 54 seats	24.24%, 56 seats	19.98%, 38 seats
Seats won	53	51	43
Seat change	▼1	▼5	▲5
Popular vote	480,754	421,613	391,134
Percentage	26.52%	23.26%	21.58%
Swing	▲0.20pp	▼0.98pp	▲1.60pp
	Fourth party	Fifth party	Sixth party
Leader	Arvo Salminen	Ralf Törngren	Eino Saari
Party	National Coalition	RKP	People's
Last election	17.04%, 33 seats	7.34%, 13 seats	3.91%, 5 seats
Seats won	28	14	10
Seat change	▼5	▲1	▲5
Popular vote	264,044	131,719	102,933
Percentage	14.57%	7.27%	5.68%
Swing	▼2.47pp	▼0.07pp	▲1.77pp
	Seventh party
Party	ÅS
Last election	0.35%, 1 seat
Seats won	1
Seat change	Steady
Popular vote	5,686
Percentage	0.31%
Swing	▼0.04pp
Prime Minister before election
Urho Kekkonen
Agrarian
Prime Minister after election
Urho Kekkonen
Agrarian

Parliamentary elections were held in Finland on 1 and 2 July 1951.

== Background ==
Urho Kekkonen of the Agrarian League had served as Prime Minister since March 1950, after losing the February 1950 presidential election to President Juho Kusti Paasikivi.

Kekkonen had governed first with the Swedish People's Party and National Progressive Party, but in January 1951 the Social Democratic Party had joined his government. The rationing of goods was ending gradually and the war reparation payments to the Soviet Union were to be completed by 1952. Prime Minister Kekkonen sought to reduce inflation by persuading the employers' organizations and labour unions to refrain from wage increases for the time being. In May 1951, these organizations agreed not to raise wages or prices for five months. During this "castle peace" or civic peace, the Social Democrats took most leadership positions in the Central Organisation of Finnish Trade Unions.

The communist Finnish People's Democratic League benefited from the fact that the Social Democrats had agreed to govern with the Agrarians, and had thus "betrayed" (according to some Communists' campaign rhetoric) their fellow left-wingers. The economy's and inflation rate's stabilization possibly hurt the low-income workers (a likely constituency of the Communists) more than the white-collar workers or the businessmen, and this could partly explain the Communists' gain of five deputies. The People's Party of Finland had been formed as the Progressives' successor, and this fresh start can have contributed to its five-seat gain. After the elections, Kekkonen continued to serve as Prime Minister, forming his third government in September 1951. He introduced a new economic stabilization programme, which tied the prices and wages to an automatic full compensation.

== Results ==
Party	Votes	%	Seats	+/–
Social Democratic Party	480,754	26.52	53	–1
Agrarian League	421,613	23.26	51	–5
Finnish People's Democratic League	391,134	21.58	43	+5
National Coalition Party	264,044	14.57	28	–5
Swedish People's Party	131,719	7.27	14	+1
People's Party of Finland	102,933	5.68	10	+5
Åland Coalition	5,686	0.31	1	0
Small Farmers Party	4,964	0.27	0	0
Liberal League	4,936	0.27	0	New
Radical People's Party	4,486	0.25	0	0
Finnish People's Party	243	0.01	0	New
Others	305	0.02	0	–
Total	1,812,817	100.00	200	0
Valid votes	1,812,817	99.29		
Invalid/blank votes	12,962	0.71		
Total votes	1,825,779	100.00		
Registered voters/turnout	2,448,239	74.58		
Source: Tilastokeskus 2004, Suomen virallinen tilasto

=== By electoral district ===
Electoral district	Total seats	Seats won						
Electoral district	Total seats	SDP	ML	SKDL	Kok	RKP	SK	ÅS
Åland	1							1
Central Finland	12	4	5	2	1			
Häme	14	5	2	3	3		1	
Kymi	15	6	4	2	3			
Lapland	8	1	3	3	1			
North Karelia	11	4	3	2	1		1	
North Savo	13	2	5	4	1		1	
North Vaasa	8	1	3	1	1	2		
Oulu	18	2	8	6	1		1	
Pirkanmaa	13	5	1	4	3			
Satakunta	15	4	4	4	3			
South Savo	12	4	5	1	1		1	
South Vaasa	10	1	3	1	2	3		
Uusimaa	33	10	2	6	5	7	3	
Varsinais-Suomi	17	4	3	4	2	2	2	
Total	200	53	51	43	28	14	10	1
Source: Statistics Finland
