= 1962 Finnish parliamentary election =

General election

← 1958	4–5 February 1962	1966 →

All 200 seats in the Parliament of Finland 101 seats needed for a majority
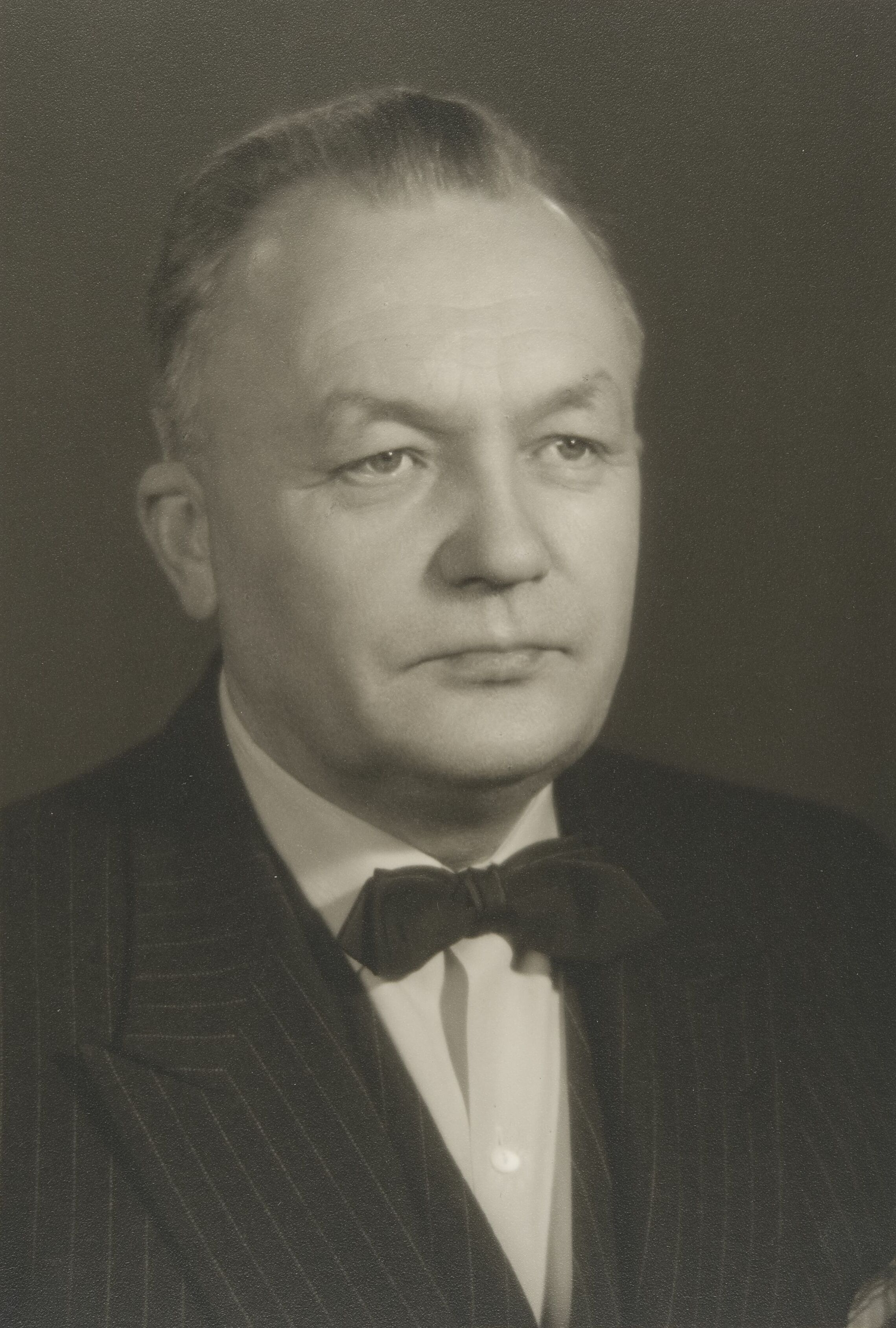

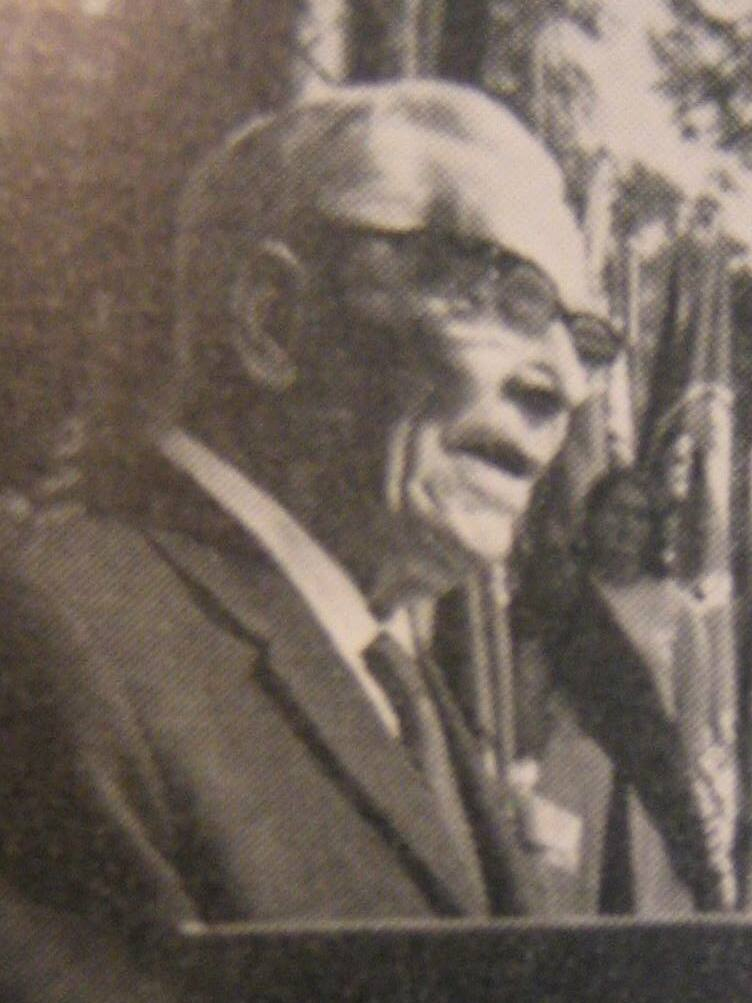

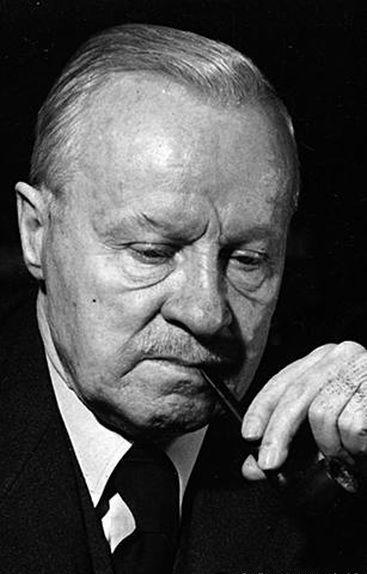

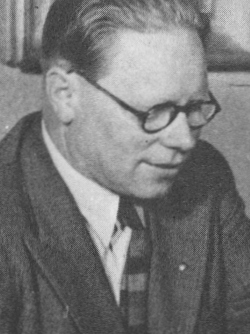

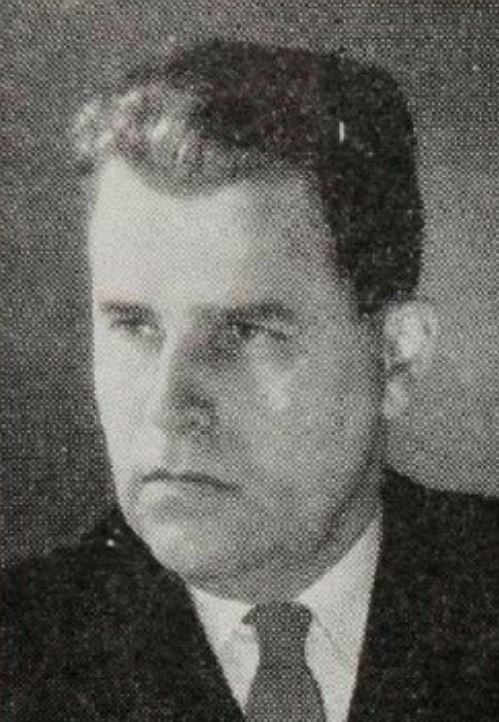

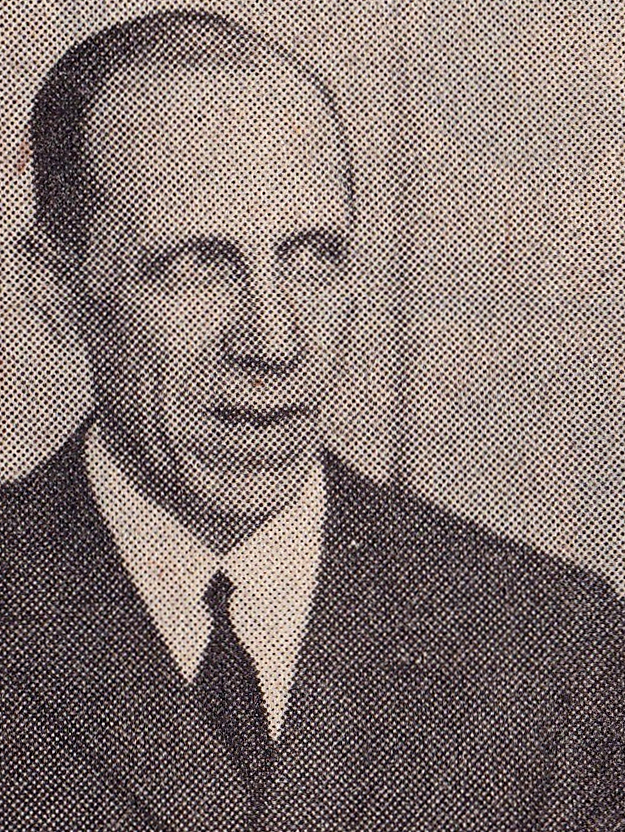

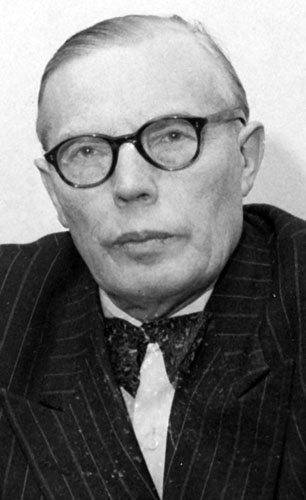

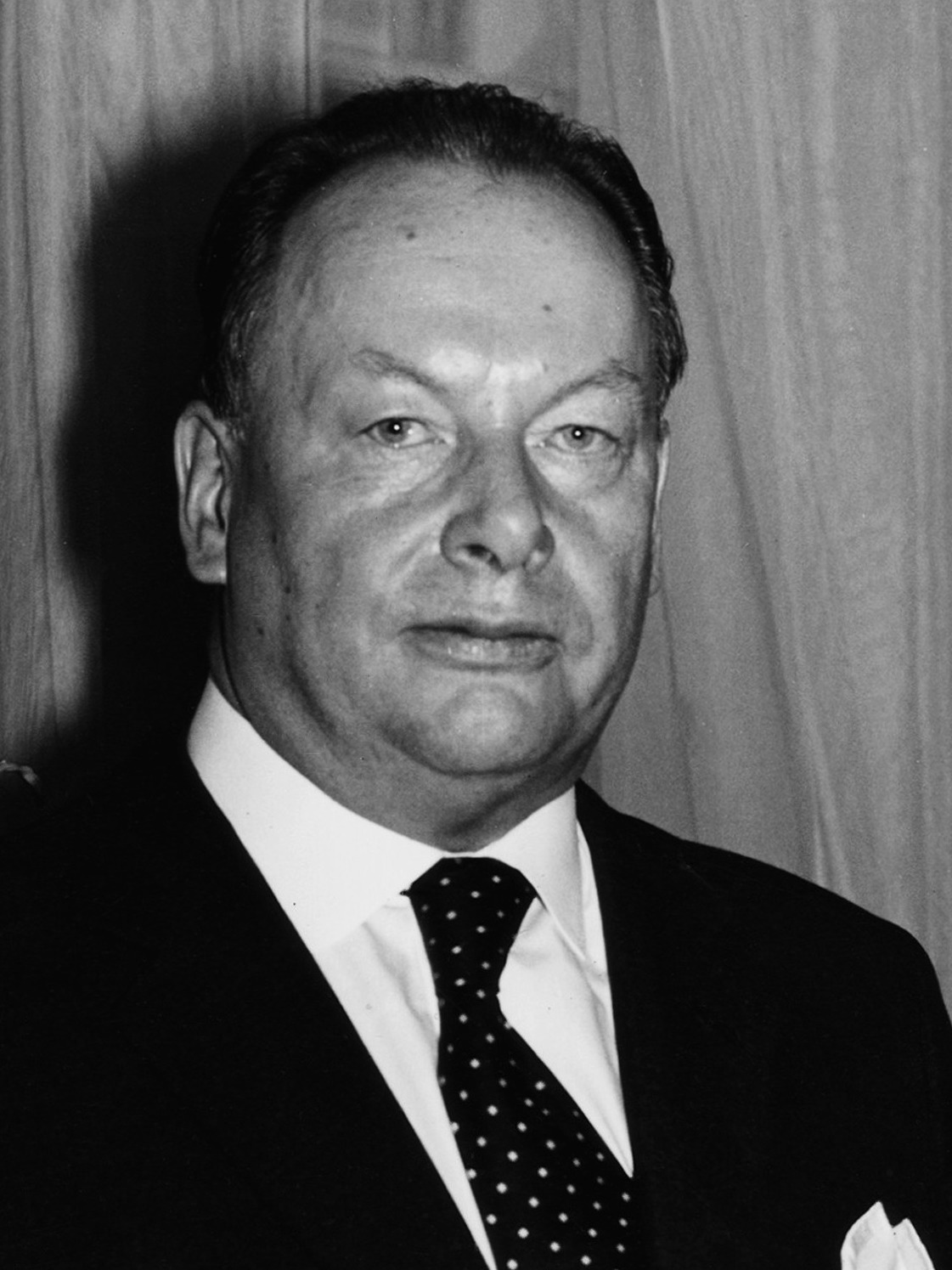
	First party	Second party	Third party
Leader	V. J. Sukselainen	Kusti Kulo	Väinö Tanner
Party	Agrarian	SKDL	SDP
Last election	23.06%, 48 seats	23.16%, 50 seats	23.12%, 48 seats
Seats won	53	47	38
Seat change	▲5	▼3	▼10
Popular vote	528,409	506,829	448,930
Percentage	22.95%	22.02%	19.50%
Swing	▼0.11pp	▼1.14pp	▼3.62pp
	Fourth party	Fifth party	Sixth party
Leader	Jussi Saukkonen	Harras Kyttä	Lars Erik Taxell
Party	National Coalition	People's	RKP
Last election	15.28%, 29 seats	5.90%, 8 seats	6.50%, 13 seats
Seats won	32	13	13
Seat change	▲3	▲5	Steady
Popular vote	346,638	146,005	140,689
Percentage	15.06%	6.34%	6.11%
Swing	▼0.22pp	▲0.44pp	▼0.39pp
	Seventh party	Eighth party	Ninth party
Leader	Emil Skog	Teuvo Aura
Party	TPSL	Liberal League	ÅS
Last election	1.75%, 3 seats	0.33%, 0 seats	0.28%, 1 seat
Seats won	2	1	1
Seat change	▼1	▲1	Steady
Popular vote	100,396	12,000	7,261
Percentage	4.36%	0.52%	0.32%
Swing	▲2.61pp	▲0.19pp	▲0.04pp
Prime Minister before election
Martti Miettunen
Agrarian
Prime Minister after election
Ahti Karjalainen
Agrarian

Parliamentary elections were held in Finland on 4 and 5 February 1962.

== Background ==
V. J. Sukselainen's second minority government had resigned in 1961, followed by Prime Minister Martti Miettunen's Agrarian first government, also a centrist minority government. In the spring of 1961, Olavi Honka, a former Chancellor of Justice (Attorney General), accepted the presidential candidacy of the Social Democratic Party, National Coalition Party, Swedish People's Party, People's Party, Smallholders' Party and the Liberal League. This Honka Alliance's goal was to defeat President Urho Kekkonen in the presidential elections of January and February 1962.

However, their plans were derailed in October 1961 when the Soviet Union sent a diplomatic note to Finland, asking it to participate in negotiations about the two countries' military co-operation. The Soviet government claimed that militarism and neo-Nazism were increasing in West Germany, and that Finland and the Soviet Union would have to negotiate on the basis of the Friendship, Co-operation and Mutual Assistance Treaty. During the Note Crisis, in late November Kekkonen dissolved Parliament and called early elections for February 1962. Shortly thereafter, Honka ended his presidential candidacy "for the fatherland's interest." Kekkonen travelled to Novosibirsk in the Soviet Union, where he negotiated briefly with the Soviet leader Nikita Khrushchev. Again Khrushchev assured Kekkonen that all was well in the Finnish-Soviet relations, despite the efforts of "anti-Soviet" Finns to worsen them.

== Campaign ==
The parliamentary elections were held in the first week of February 1962, between the Electoral College elections and the second phase of the presidential elections. The parties that still opposed Kekkonen's re-election had trouble campaigning in both the presidential and the parliamentary elections. After the parliamentary elections, Ahti Karjalainen of the Agrarian League formed a centre-right majority government that remained in office until December 1963. It was replaced by another caretaker government, led by Bureau Chief (a senior civil servant) Reino Lehto.

== Results ==
Party	Votes	%	Seats	+/–
Agrarian League	528,409	22.95	53	+5
Finnish People's Democratic League	506,829	22.02	47	–3
Social Democratic Party	448,930	19.50	38	–10
National Coalition Party	346,638	15.06	32	+3
People's Party	146,005	6.34	13	+5
Swedish People's Party	140,689	6.11	13	0
Social Democratic Union of Workers and Smallholders	100,396	4.36	2	–1
Smallholders' Party	49,773	2.16	0	New
Liberal League	12,000	0.52	1	+1
Centre Party	8,686	0.38	0	New
Åland Coalition	7,261	0.32	1	0
Smallholders' Party Opposition	6,329	0.27	0	New
Others	53	0.00	0	–
Total	2,301,998	100.00	200	0
Valid votes	2,301,998	99.65		
Invalid/blank votes	8,092	0.35		
Total votes	2,310,090	100.00		
Registered voters/turnout	2,714,838	85.09		
Source: Tilastokeskus 2004

=== By electoral district ===
Electoral district	Total seats	Seats won								
Electoral district	Total seats	ML	SKDL	SDP	Kok	SK	RKP	TPSL	VL	ÅS
Åland	1									1
Central Finland	11	3	3	2	1	1		1		
Häme	14	3	3	4	3	1				
Helsinki	20		4	4	4	3	3	1	1	
Kymi	15	4	2	5	4					
Lapland	9	4	3		1	1				
North Karelia	10	4	2	2	1	1				
North Savo	12	4	4	1	2	1				
Oulu	18	9	6	1	1	1				
Pirkanmaa	12	1	4	3	3	1				
Satakunta	14	4	4	3	3					
South Savo	11	5	1	3	2					
Uusimaa	17	2	4	5	2	1	3			
Vaasa	20	7	3	2	3		5			
Varsinais-Suomi	16	3	4	3	2	2	2			
Total	200	53	47	38	32	13	13	2	1	1
Source: Statistics Finland
