= 1948 Finnish parliamentary election =

General election

← 1945	1–2 July 1948	1951 →

All 200 seats in the Parliament of Finland 101 seats needed for a majority
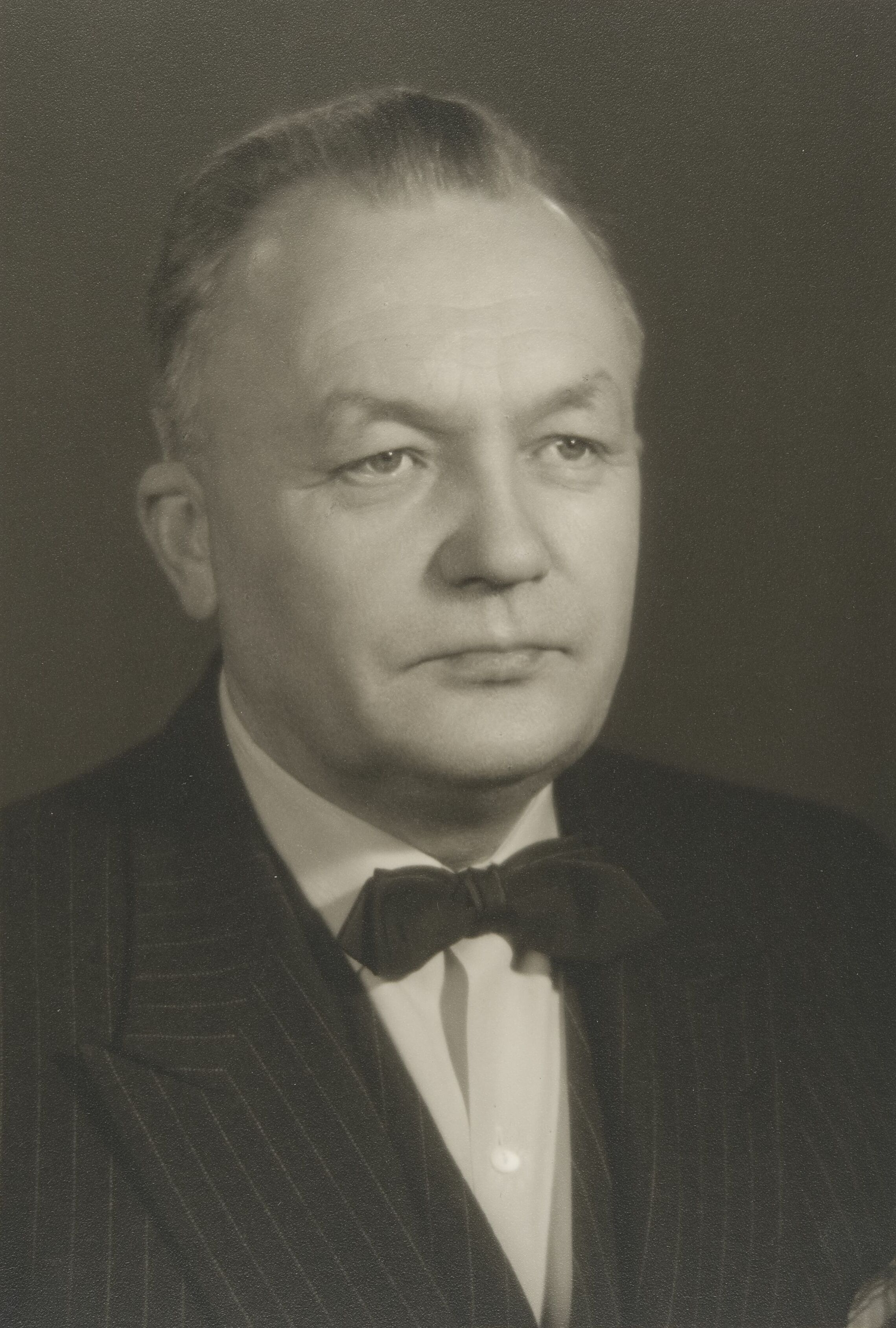

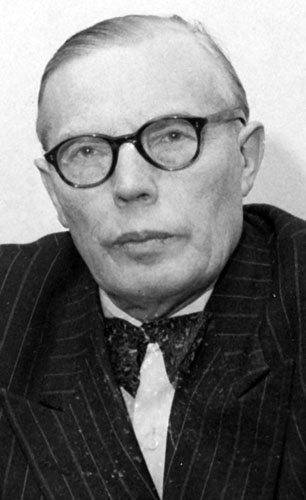

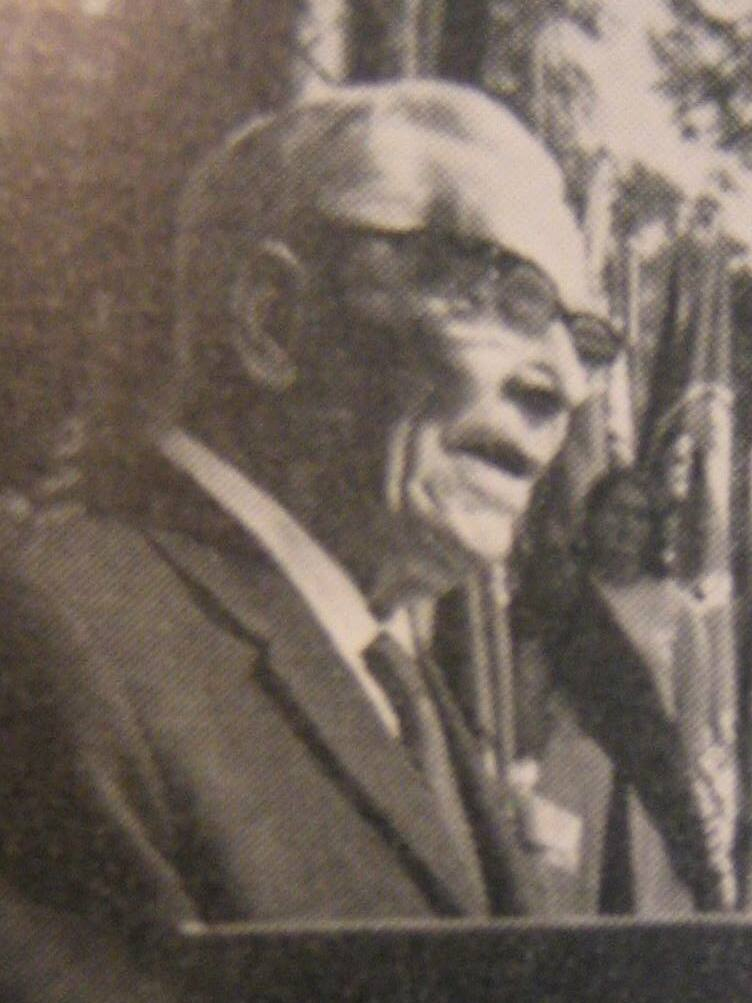

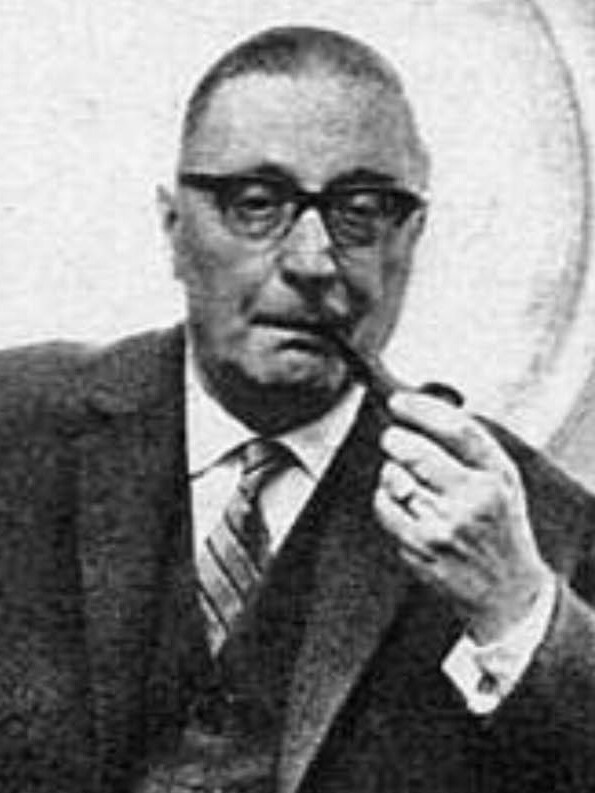

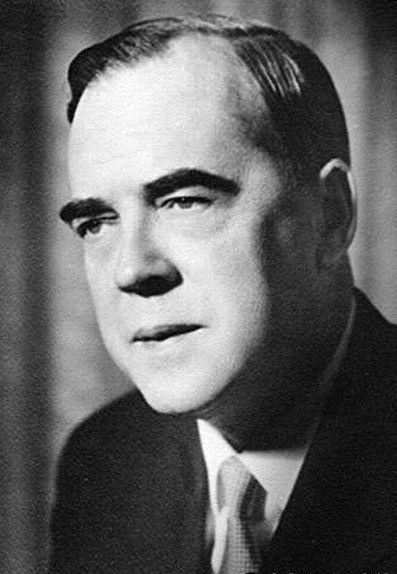

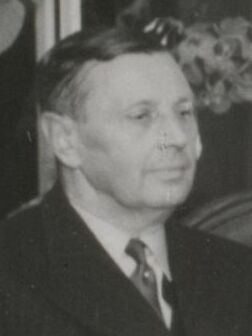
	First party	Second party	Third party
Leader	V. J. Sukselainen	Emil Skog	Kusti Kulo
Party	Agrarian	SDP	SKDL
Last election	49 seats, 21.35%	50 seats, 25.08%	49 seats, 23.47%
Seats won	56	54	38
Seat change	▲7	▲4	▼11
Popular vote	455,635	494,719	375,538
Percentage	24.24%	26.32%	19.98%
Swing	▲2.89pp	▲1.24pp	▼3.49pp
	Fourth party	Fifth party	Sixth party
Leader	Arvo Salminen	Ralf Törngren	Akseli Nikula
Party	National Coalition	RKP	National Progressive
Last election	28 seats, 15.04%	14 seats, 7.90%	9 seats, 5.17%
Seats won	33	13	5
Seat change	▲5	▼1	▼4
Popular vote	320,366	137,981	73,444
Percentage	17.04%	7.34%	3.91%
Swing	▲2.00pp	▼0.56pp	▼1.26pp
	Seventh party
Party	ÅS
Last election	–
Seats won	1
Seat change	new
Popular vote	6,567
Percentage	0.35%
Swing	new
Prime Minister before election
Mauno Pekkala
SKDL
Prime Minister after election
Karl-August Fagerholm
SDP

Parliamentary elections were held in Finland on 1 and 2 July 1948.

== Background ==
The political atmosphere during the July 1948 Finnish parliamentary elections was heated. Many Finns across the party lines believed that the communists and the Finnish People's Democratic League had pursued their goal of making Finland a solidly left-wing country too vigorously. They had even held the prime ministership since March 1946, with Mauno Pekkala serving in that position. They had organized many mass meetings, demanded the dismissal of "reactionary" (especially right-wing) civil servants and claimed that the Finnish government had to adopt even a friendlier relationship with the Soviet Union. They had vigorously supported the imprisonment of eight former top politicians, including former president Risto Ryti, for "war guilt" (making decisions that resulted in the Continuation War of 1941 to 1944 between Finland, the Soviet Union and Germany). In the spring of 1948, there were even unproven rumours of an imminent coup attempt by the Finnish communists. Some Finnish war veterans condemned the communist interior minister Yrjö Leino for deporting to the Soviet Union Ingrian Finns, East Karelians and Estonians who had fought in the Finnish army during the Continuation War. The controversy over the treatment of these "prisoners of Leino", several of whom were Finnish citizens, forced Leino to resign in May 1948.

The Social Democratic Party's election slogan was: "Enough already: price hikes, lying promises, opinion terror, forced democracy." The Agrarian League's election slogan was: "On these leans the Agrarian League" under the Bible and the Finnish law. The National Coalition Party declared simply: "Be free." These traditional democratic parties gained a total of 16 members of parliament in the election, while the communists lost 11, compared to the 1945 election.

After the election, the Finnish politics began to stabilize. The United States appreciated Finland's desire to remain a Western democracy, despite its close relationship with the Soviet Union, symbolized by the Friendship, Co-operation and Mutual Assistance Treaty (FCMA), which was signed in April 1948. After the election, the Social Democrats formed a minority government under prime minister Karl-August Fagerholm. They did not want to form a government with the Agrarian League, claimed the late veteran agrarian-centrist politician Johannes Virolainen, because they feared that they would lose votes to the communists in the next election. The Agrarian League quietly supported Fagerholm's government.

== Results ==
=== Summary ===
Party	Votes	%	Seats	+/–
Social Democratic Party	494,719	26.32	54	+4
Agrarian League	455,635	24.24	56	+7
Finnish People's Democratic League	375,538	19.98	38	–11
National Coalition Party	320,366	17.04	33	+5
Swedish People's Party	137,981	7.34	13	–1
National Progressive Party	73,444	3.91	5	–4
Åland Coalition	6,567	0.35	1	New
Small Farmers Party	5,378	0.29	0	0
Radical People's Party	5,162	0.27	0	0
Others	5,178	0.28	0	–
Total	1,879,968	100.00	200	0
Valid votes	1,879,968	99.27		
Invalid/blank votes	13,869	0.73		
Total votes	1,893,837	100.00		
Registered voters/turnout	2,420,287	78.25		
Source: Tilastokeskus 2004

=== By electoral district ===
Electoral district	Total seats	Seats won						
Electoral district	Total seats	ML	SDP	SKDL	Kok	RKP	KE	ÅS
Åland	1							1
Central Finland	11	4	3	2	2			
Häme	11	2	4	2	3			
Kymi	32	12	10	3	6		1	
Lapland	8	4	1	2	1			
North Karelia	10	4	4	1	1			
North Savo	11	4	2	4	1			
North Vaasa	8	3	1	1	1	2		
Oulu	17	8	2	5	1		1	
Pirkanmaa	12	1	5	3	3			
Satakunta	13	3	4	3	3			
South Savo	11	5	4	1	1			
South Vaasa	10	3	1	1	2	3		
Uusimaa	31	1	9	6	6	7	2	
Varsinais-Suomi	14	2	4	4	2	1	1	
Total	200	56	54	38	33	13	5	1
Source: Statistics Finland
