= Akseli Nikula =

Finnish psychiatrist and politician

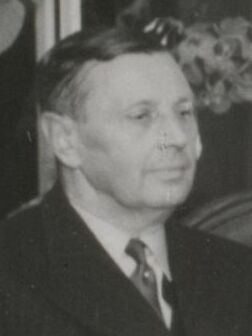
Akseli Nikula in 1946

Akseli Jalmari Nikula (29 October 1884 – 14 January 1956) was a Finnish psychiatrist and politician, born in Tammela. He served as a Member of the Parliament of Finland, representing the Young Finnish Party from 1913 to 1916 and the National Progressive Party from 1940 to 1945. Nikula was the chairman of the National Progressive Party from 1947 to 1950. In the 1950s, he was the vice-chairman of the Liberal League.
