= People's Party of Finland (1951) =

People's Party of Finland Suomen Kansanpuolue
- Founded: 1951
- Dissolved: 1965
- Succeeded by: Liberal People's Party
- Women's wing: Kansanpuolueen Naiset
- Youth wing: Liberaalinen Nuorisoliitto
- Ideology: Liberalism

The People's Party of Finland (Finnish: Suomen Kansanpuolue) was a liberal political party in Finland.

== History ==
The party was founded on 3 February 1951 after the National Progressive Party was disbanded. In the July 1951 elections, it won ten of the 200 seats in Parliament, an increase from the five won by the National Progressive Party in 1948.

The party went on to win 13 seats in the 1954 elections, before being reduced to eight seats in the 1958 elections. The 1962 elections saw the party win 13 seats. In 1965, it merged with the Liberal League to form the Liberal People's Party.

== Leaders ==
Presidents

- Eino Saari 1951–1958
- Veli Merikoski 1959–1960
- Harras Kyttä 1961–1963
- Esa Kaitila 1964–1965

General Secretaries

- Osmo Kupiainen 1951–
- Pekka Malinen 1952–1960
- Helge Halsti 1960–1965

== Election results ==
Parliament of Finland
Date	Votes			Seats		Position	Size
Date	No.	%	± pp	No.	±	Position	Size
1951	102,933	5.68	New	10 / 200	New	Opposition	6th
1954	158,323	7.88	▲2.20	13 / 200	▲3	Opposition	▲5th
1958	114,617	5.90	▼1.98	8 / 200	▼5	Coalition	▼6th
1962	146,005	6.34	▲0.44	13 / 200	▲5	Coalition	▲5th
