= People's Temperance League (Finland) =

Finnish temperance organization

People's Temperance League (in Finnish: Kansan Raittiusliitto, KRL), is a temperance organization formerly linked to the Finnish People's Democratic League (SKDL). In the 1970s KRL was taken over by the orthodox pro-USSR-wing of the Communist Party of Finland. Thus SKDL and SKP launched a new temperance organization, the People's Democratic Temperance League (Kansandemokraattinen raittiusliitto). The KRL was founded in 1948 as Center of People's Temperance Work (Kansan Raittiustyön Keskus, KaRaKe). The name was changed in 1956.

== See also ==
- Temperance organizations
