= Paavo Aitio =

Finnish politician (1918–1989)

Paavo Johannes Aitio
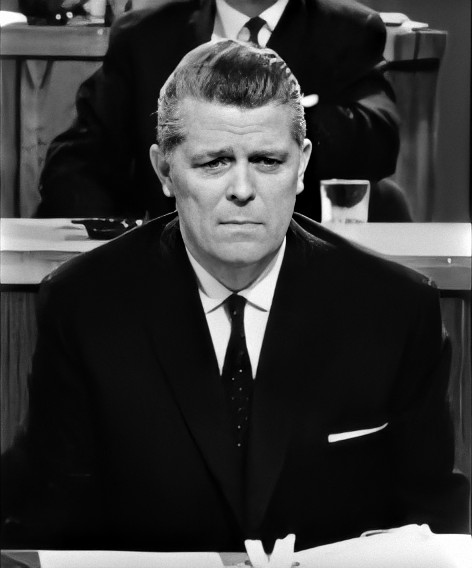
- Paavo Aitio in 1966

Minister of Labor
- In office 30 November 1975 – 29 September 1976
- Prime Minister: Martti Miettunen
- Preceded by: Ilmo Paananen
- Succeeded by: Paavo Väyrynen

Minister of Transport
- In office 22 March 1968 – 14 May 1970
- Prime Minister: Mauno Koivisto
- Preceded by: Leo Suonpää
- Succeeded by: Martti Niskala

Personal details
- Born: Paavo Johannes Aitio; 14 July 1918; Turku, Finland
- Died: 1 June 1989 (aged 70); Turku, Finland
- Party: Finnish People's Democratic League

Paavo Johannes Aitio (14 July 1918 Turku – 1 June 1989 Turku) was a Finnish politician who served as a Member the Parliament of Finland from 1951 to 1977, representing the Finnish People's Democratic League (SKDL), Minister in two governments and Governor of Turku and Pori (1977–1985). He was a candidate for the SKDL in the 1962 presidential election. He was elected to the parliament of Finland in 1956.

After his retirement from politics, Aitio was named an honorary professor of political science by the University of Turku in 1980.
