= Päivän Sanomat =

Socialist newspaper in Finland (1957–1972)

- Type: Daily newspaper
- Publisher: Ladottu Meali Oy
- Founded: 1957
- Ceased publication: 13 October 1972
- Political alignment: Left socialism
- Language: Finnish
- Headquarters: Helsinki
- Country: Finland

Päivän Sanomat (Finnish: Daily News) was a left socialist newspaper published between 1957 and 1972 in Helsinki, Finland. Its subtitle was ammattiyhdistys- ja työläisurheiluväen sanomalehti (Finnish: Newspaper of trade union and workers). It was financed by the Soviet Union during its early years.

== History and profile ==
Päivän Sanomat was launched in 1957 by the members of a dissident group, Social Democratic League, who left the Social Democratic Party. Its establishment was funded by the Soviet Union. The paper was first published by the publishing house which also published the communist paper Kansan Uutiset. Later its publisher became Ladottu Meali Oy based in Helsinki. The founding editor-in-chief was Matti Kurjensaari. Emil Skog joined its editorial board in 1959.

Päivän Sanomat had a left socialist leaning and was published daily except Sunday. When Norwegian Army joined a number of manoeuvres with the NATO forces in northern Norway from 1962, the Soviet Union criticized Norway. About this incident Päivän Sanomat adopted a moderate stance arguing that Norway should not damage the Nordic balance. The paper and Kansan Uutiset both condemned the anti-Soviet discourse of the Chinese ruler Mao Zedong.

The paper folded on 13 October 1972 with the publication of the last issue numbered 190.

== Circulation ==
Päivän Sanomat sold 60,000 copies in 1958 and 90,000 copies in 1959.
