= Rolf Berner =

Finnish business executive and politician (1894–1978)

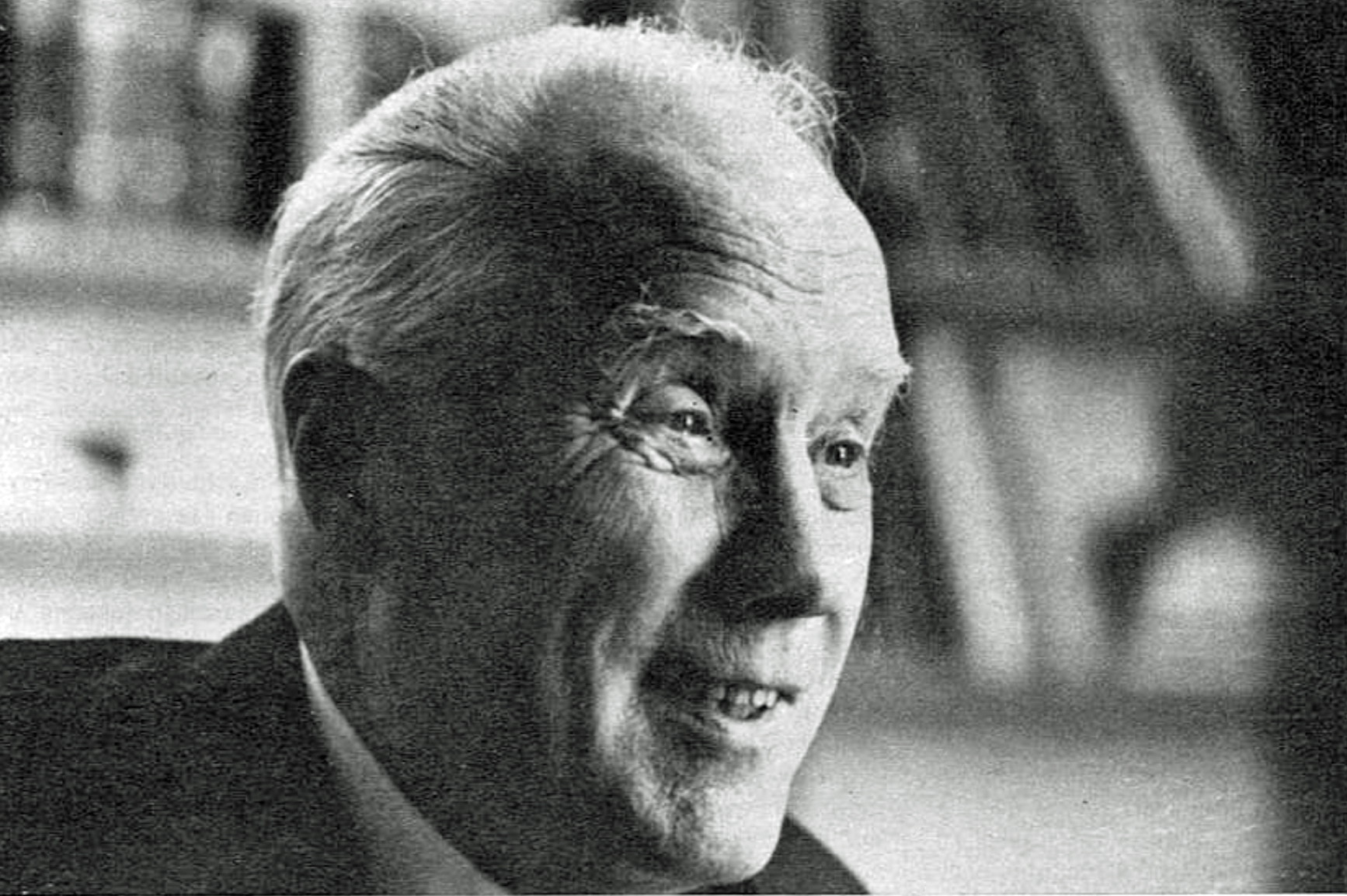
Rolf B. Berner

Rolf Brostrup Berner (20 June 1894 – 26 August 1978) was a Finnish business executive and politician, born in Helsinki. He was a member of the Parliament of Finland from 1945 to 1951, representing the National Progressive Party. When the National Progressive Party ceased to exist in 1951, Berner joined the Liberal League. He was a presidential elector in the 1940, 1943 and 1950 presidential elections. He was the father of Arne Berner.
