= Jussi Saukkonen =

20th century Finnish politician

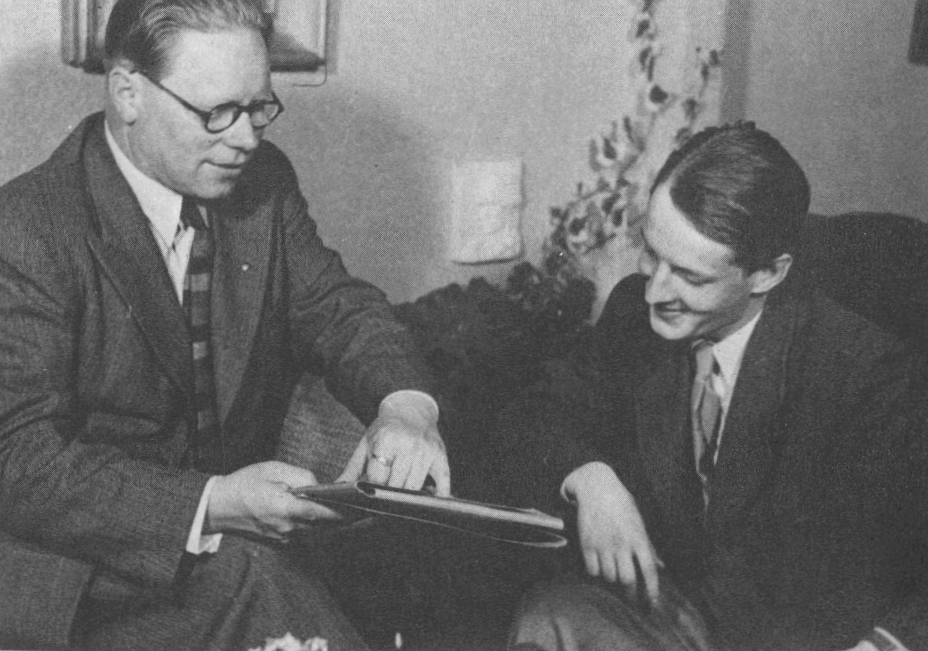
Jussi Saukkonen (left) with Juha Rihtniemi, a party colleague, in 1951.

Jussi Jaakko Saukkonen (until 1948 Johan Jaakoppi; 17 February 1905 – 6 April 1986) was a Finnish politician and a Member of the Parliament of Finland.

He was born in Oulu and became a member of the National Coalition Party (Finland); he was chairman of the party for ten years between 1955 and 1965. He died in Helsinki, aged 81.
