= Liberal League (Finland) =

- Finnish name: Vapaamielisten liitto
- Swedish name: De Frisinnades Förbund
- Abbreviation: VL
- Founded: 1951
- Dissolved: 1965
- Split from: National Progressive Party
- Merged into: Liberals
- Ideology: Liberalism

Liberal League (Finnish: Vapaamielisten liitto, VL; Swedish: De Frisinnades Förbund) was a Finnish liberal political party. VL existed from 1951 until 1965.

The party was founded in spring 1951 by the minority of National Progressive Party, led by Helsinki group, as the party finished its existence. Most of the former Progressive party members joined the People's Party of Finland.

VL included among others MP Rolf B. Berner, minister Teuvo Aura and the director of the Bank of Finland and once PM, Sakari Tuomioja. VL was heir to National Progressive Party seat in the Liberal International – People's Party was not accepted into the International as a result.

VL proposed Sakari Tuomioja as candidate for 1956 presidential elections. He was also supported by National Coalition Party. Tuomioja eventually lost the race to Urho Kekkonen, the Agrarian League candidate and a favourite of Moscow.

In 1965, the VL merged with the People's Party into Liberal People's Party, which was founded December 29, 1965; the Eduskunta factions also merged.

== Elections ==
Results
Parliamentary
Year	MPs	Votes	
1951	0	4,936	0.27%
1954	0	6,810	0.34%
1958	0	6,242	0.32%
1962	1	12,000	0.52%
Presidential
Vuosi	Candidate / Electors	Äänet	
1956	Sakari Tuomioja / 3	32,662	1.7%
1962	1	7,898	0.4%
