= Finnish People's Democratic League =

1944–1990 Finnish political party

- Finnish name: Suomen Kansan Demokraattinen Liitto
- Swedish name: Demokratiska Förbundet för Finlands Folk
- Founded: October 29, 1944
- Dissolved: April 1990
- Merged into: Left Alliance
- Newspaper: Vapaa Sana 1944–1956; Kansan Uutiset 1957–1990
- Student wing: Socialist Student League
- Youth wing: Democratic Youth League of Finland
- Women's wing: Democratic Women's League of Finland
- Children's wing: Democratic Union of Finnish Pioneers
- Ideology: Progressivism; Socialism; Anti-capitalism; Factions: Communism (Dominant); Scientific socialism
- Political position: Left-wing
- Colours: Red and green

Finnish People's Democratic League (Finnish: Suomen Kansan Demokraattinen Liitto, SKDL; Swedish: Demokratiska Förbundet för Finlands Folk, DFFF) was a Finnish political organisation with the aim of uniting those left of the Finnish Social Democratic Party. It was founded in 1944 as the anti-communist laws in Finland were repealed due to the demands of the Soviet Union, and lasted until 1990, when it merged into the newly formed Left Alliance. At its time, SKDL was one of the largest leftist parties in capitalist Europe, with its main member party, the Communist Party of Finland, being one of the largest communist parties west of the Iron Curtain. The SKDL enjoyed its greatest electoral success in the 1958 parliamentary election, when it gained a support of approximately 23 per cent and a representation of 50 MPs of 200 total, making it the largest party in the Eduskunta.

SKDL joined several Finnish governments. The first SKDL minister was Yrjö Leino who took office in November 1944. After the 1945 parliamentary election SKDL was a major player in the Paasikivi III coalition with social democrats and parties of the centre, and in 1946 SKDL's Mauno Pekkala became the prime minister. The Pekkala government led the state until summer 1948, after which the SKDL didn't participate in any coalitions until 1966. The late 1960s governments, led by social democrats and including centre, were called popular front by the SKDL. The party left the government in spring 1971 but returned in 1975. Kalevi Sorsa's third coalition was the last one SKDL was in, until December 1982.

== Organisation ==
A person could be aligned to the SKDL through its basic organisations or as member of the "community members" which were the Communist Party of Finland (SKP), the Democratic League of Finnish Women (1944–1990), Academic Socialist Society (1944–1965), Suomen Toverikuntien Liitto (1946–1952), the Socialist Unity Party (SYP) (1946–1955), the Socialist Student League (1965–) and the Democratic Youth League of Finland (1967–1990). During most of its existence, the SKDL had over 50 000 "own" members. In addition to the community members, tens of different nationwide organizations were controlled by the SKDL members, see for example the People's Temperance League.

The supporters of the SKP constantly had a majority in the SKDL, thus it was regarded by many as a communist front. The SKP members often attended two consecutive meetings to decide on the same issues. However, not even socialism was mentioned in the party programme until the late 1960s. The number of communist party members amongst the SKDL MPs constantly increased from 1945 on, even though many prominent left-wing socialists and former social democrats had joined the alliance in the 1940s.

One of the few organized non-SKP forces in SKDL was the Socialist Unity Party (SYP) which was founded mainly by former social democrats in 1946. The small and marginalized SYP left the SKDL in 1955. However, most of the socialists inside the SKDL chose not to follow the decision made by the party chair Atos Wirtanen. They remained members of the SKDL through its basic organisations. In the early 1970s, a Joint Committee of the SKDL Socialists was formed but it never developed an organisation and remained a loose coalition.

== Publications ==
Vapaa Sana was SKDL's party organ from 1944 until 1956. SKDL also published many regional daily newspapers. In 1957 Vapaa Sana was merged with the SKP organ Työkansan Sanomat to launch Kansan Uutiset, which was the organ of both parties until 1990. Kansan Uutiset still appears. Since 2000, it has been a member of Left Alliance.

== Leaders ==
Chairmen

K. H. Wiik	1944
Cay Sundström	1944–1946
J. W. Keto	1946–1948
Kusti Kulo	1948–1967
Ele Alenius	1967–1979
Kalevi Kivistö	1979–1985
Esko Helle	1985–1988
Reijo Käkelä	1988–1990

General secretaries

Tyyne Tuominen	1944–1949
Yrjö Enne	1949–1952
Hertta Kuusinen	1952–1958
Yrjö Enne	1959–1961
Mauno Tamminen	1962–1965
Ele Alenius	1965–1967
Aimo Haapanen	1967–1977
Jorma Hentilä	1977–1984
Reijo Käkelä	1984–1988
Salme Kandolin	1988–1990

== Electoral results ==
=== Parliamentary elections ===
Election	Votes	%	Seats	+/-	Status
1945	398,618	23.47%	49 / 200	New	Coalition government (1945–1946)
1945	398,618	23.47%	49 / 200	New	Leading government (1946–1948)
1948	375,538	19.98%	38 / 200	▼11	Opposition
1951	391,134	21.58%	43 / 200	▲5	Opposition
1954	433,251	21.57%	43 / 200	Steady	Opposition
1958	450,220	23.16%	50 / 200	▲7	Opposition
1962	506,829	22.02%	47 / 200	▼3	Opposition
1966	502,374	21.20%	41 / 200	▼6	Coalition government
1970	420,556	16.58%	36 / 200	▼5	Coalition government (1970–1971)
1970	420,556	16.58%	36 / 200	▼5	Opposition (1971)
1972	438,757	17.02%	37 / 200	▲1	Opposition
1975	519,483	18.89%	40 / 200	▲3	Coalition government (1975–1976)
1975	519,483	18.89%	40 / 200	▲3	Opposition (1976–1977)
1975	519,483	18.89%	40 / 200	▲3	Coalition government (1977–1979)
1979	518,045	17.90%	35 / 200	▼5	Coalition government (1979–1982)
1979	518,045	17.90%	35 / 200	▼5	Opposition (1982–1983)
1983	400,930	13.46%	26 / 200	▼9	Opposition
1987	270,433	9.39%	16 / 200	▼10	Opposition

=== Local elections ===
Year	Councillors	Votes	Share of votes
1945	2 496	275 324	
1947	2 005	314 156	20,4%
1950	2 517	347 102	23,04%
1953	2 546	406 324	23,10%
1956	2 272	353 967	21,2%
1960	2 409	432 146	22,0%
1964	2 417	470 550	21,9%
1968	1 770	382 882	16,91%
1972	1 731	437 130	17,48%
1976	2 050	494 920	18,45%
1980	1 835	456 177	16,64%
1984	1 482	354 582	13,15%
1988	1 209	270 532	10,29%

=== Presidential elections ===
==== Indirect ====
Year	Popular Vote		Electors	Candidate	Electoral Vote		
Year	Votes	%	Electors	Candidate	First round	Second round	Third round
1950	338,035	21.4	67	Mauno Pekkala	67	not held	
1956	354,575	18.7	56	Eino Kilpi	56	did not advance	
1962	451,750	20.5	63	Paavo Aitio	67	not held	
1968	345,609	17.0	56	supported Urho Kekkonen of Centre	201	not held	
1978	445,098	18.2	56	supported Urho Kekkonen of Centre	259	not held	
1982	348,359	11.0	32	Kalevi Kivistö	32	11	not held
1988	286,833	9.6	26	Kalevi Kivistö	26	26	not held

==== Direct ====
Year	Votes	%	Candidate
1988	330,072	10.7	Kalevi Kivistö

None of the party's own candidates were elected President, although Urho Kekkonen was elected both times when SKDL seconded him.

== See also ==
- Kaisu-Mirjami Rydberg
- Communist Party of Finland
