= Eino Saari =

Finnish forester and politician (1894–1971)

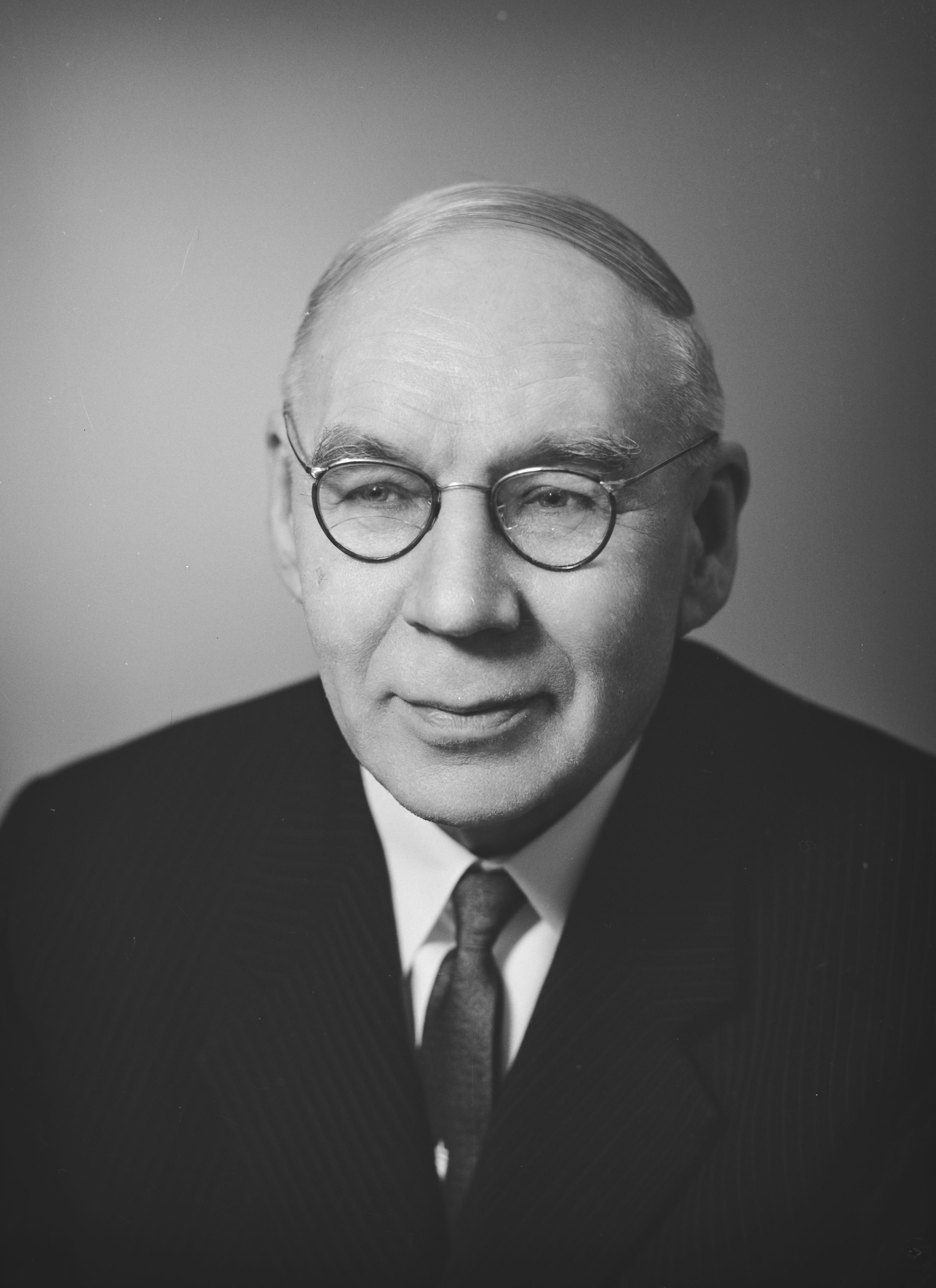
Eino Saari in 1961

Eino Armas Saari (7 October 1894 – 13 April 1971) was a Finnish forester and politician, born in Turku. He was a member of the Parliament of Finland from 1954 until 1958, representing the People's Party of Finland. He served as Minister of Social Affairs from 3 March 1956 to 16 May 1957. He was the chairman of the People's Party of Finland from 1951 to 1958.
