= Arvo Salminen =

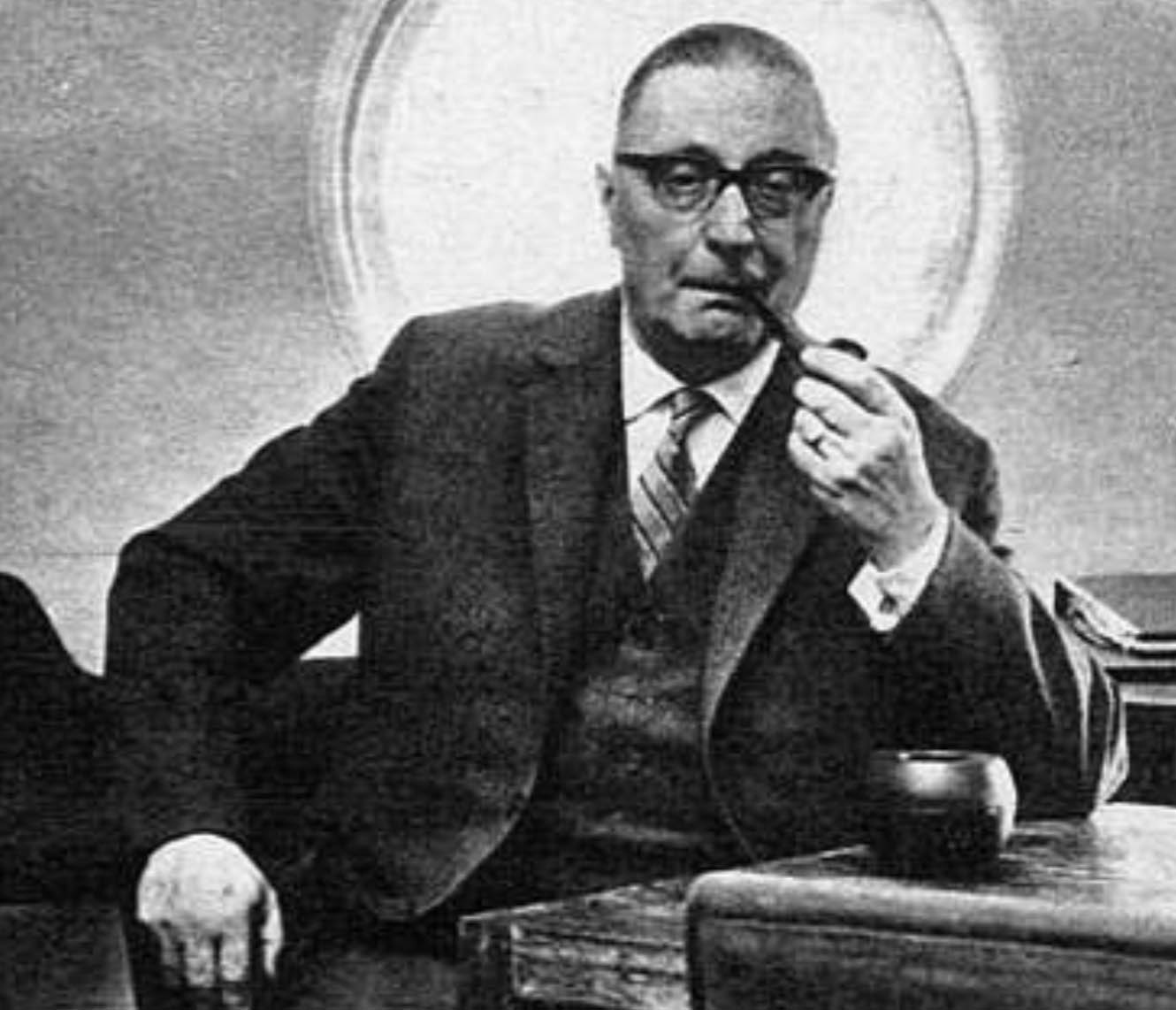
Arvo Salminen

Arvo Ilmari Salminen (5 August 1896, born in Pori – 26 July 1967, died in Helsinki) was a Finnish Lutheran clergyman and politician. Salminen held a divinity degree as well as a law degree.

He was a member of the National Coalition Party (Finland) and was the chairman of the party in 1946–1954. He served in Parliament in 1945–1948 and again in 1951–1958. He also served as Finnish Minister of Education in the caretaker government from 17 November 1953 to 5 May 1954.
