= 1962 Finnish presidential election =

- 15–16 January 1962
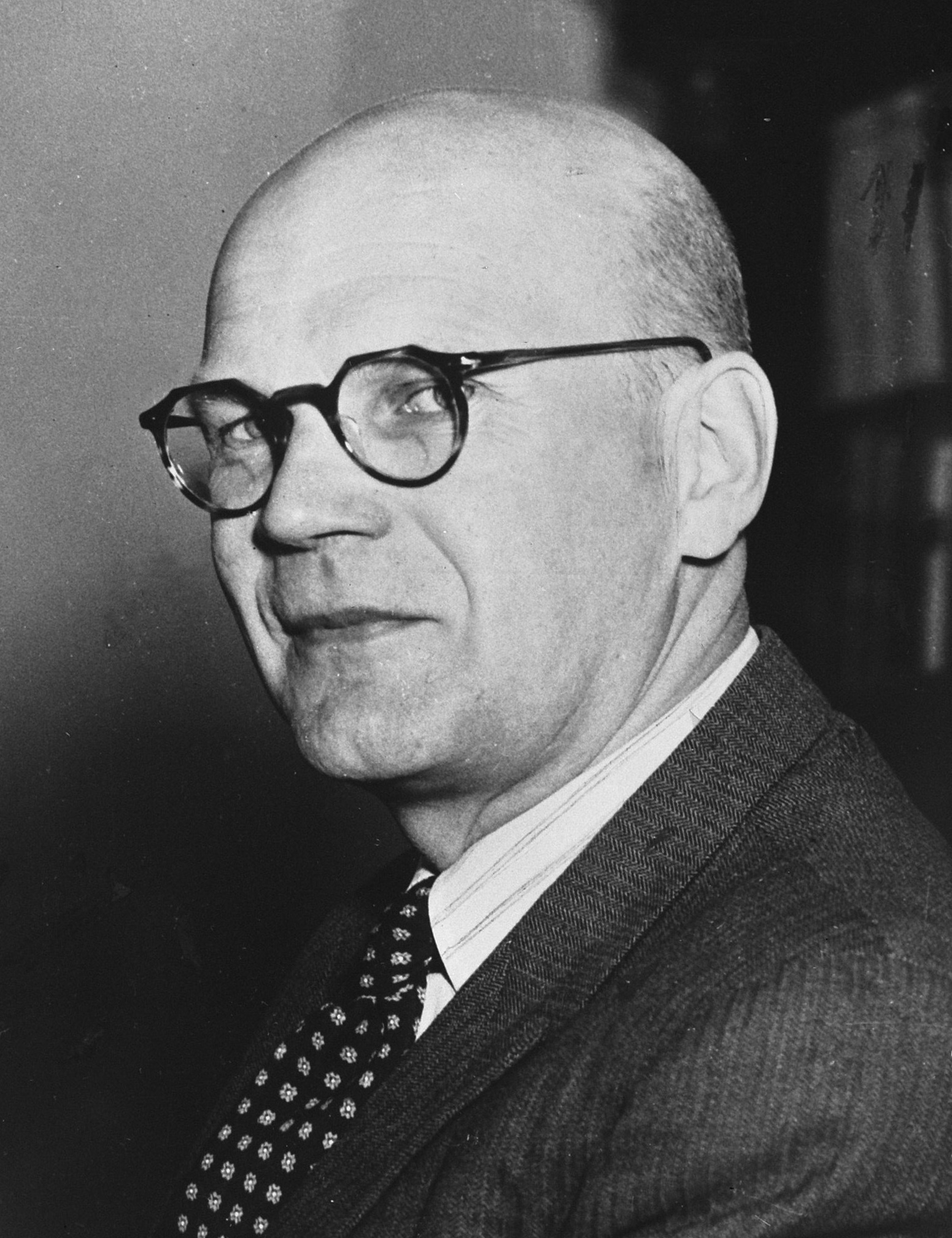

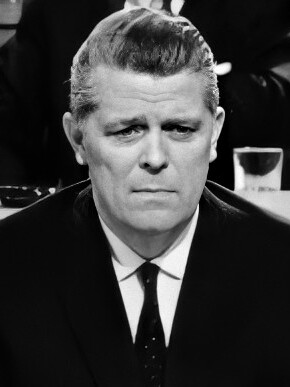

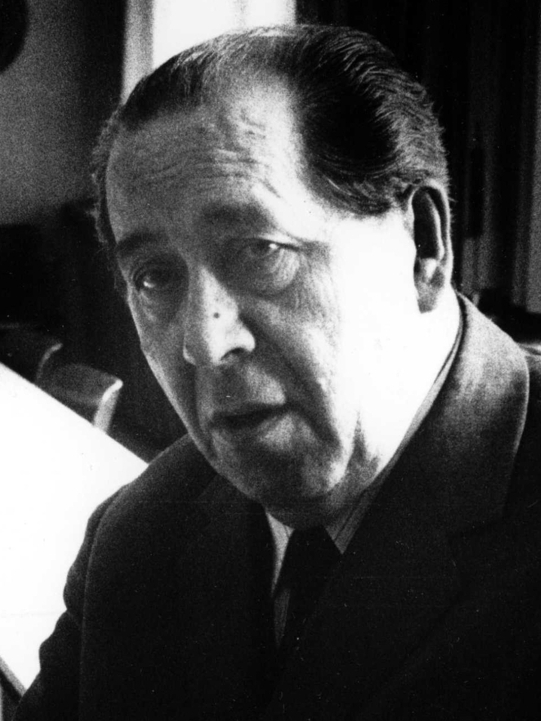
Candidate	Urho Kekkonen	Paavo Aitio	Rafael Paasio
Party	Agrarian	SKDL	SDP
Electoral vote	199	62	37
Popular vote	1,394,886	451,750	289,366
Percentage	44.29%	20.51%	13.14%
President before election
Urho Kekkonen
Agrarian
Elected President
Urho Kekkonen
Agrarian

Two-stage presidential elections were held in Finland in 1962. On 15 and 16 January the public elected presidential electors to an electoral college. They in turn elected the President. The result was a victory for Urho Kekkonen, who won on the first ballot. The turnout for the popular vote was 81.5%.

== Background ==
Since Kekkonen's extremely narrow victory in the 1956 Finnish presidential elections, his political opponents had planned to defeat him in the election of 1962.

In the spring of 1961, the Social Democrats, National Coalition Party, Swedish People's Party, People's Party, Small Farmers' Party and the Liberal League nominated former Chancellor of Justice Olavi Honka as their presidential candidate.

The Honka League's goal was to receive a majority of the 300 presidential electors, and thus defeat President Kekkonen.

At the end of October 1961, the Soviet government sent a diplomatic note to the Finnish Government, claiming that neo-fascism and militarism were growing so much in West Germany that Finland and the Soviet Union were in danger of being attacked by that country or by some other NATO member states.

Thus the Soviet Union asked Finland to negotiate on possible joint military co-operation under the Finno-Soviet Treaty articles.

The Note Crisis alarmed many Finnish people, politicians and ordinary voters alike. In late November 1961, Honka dropped his presidential candidacy. Kekkonen then travelled to the Soviet Union where the Soviet leader, Nikita Khrushchev, briefly negotiated with him and assured the audience in Novosibirsk that Finland and the Soviet Union continued to have good relations, although some Finns tried to worsen them, and that joint military exercises were not needed, after all.

Following the Note Crisis, Kekkonen's popularity soared, as many Finnish voters believed him to be more capable than his opponents of defending Finland's neutrality and security. Kekkonen was easily re-elected President

== Results ==
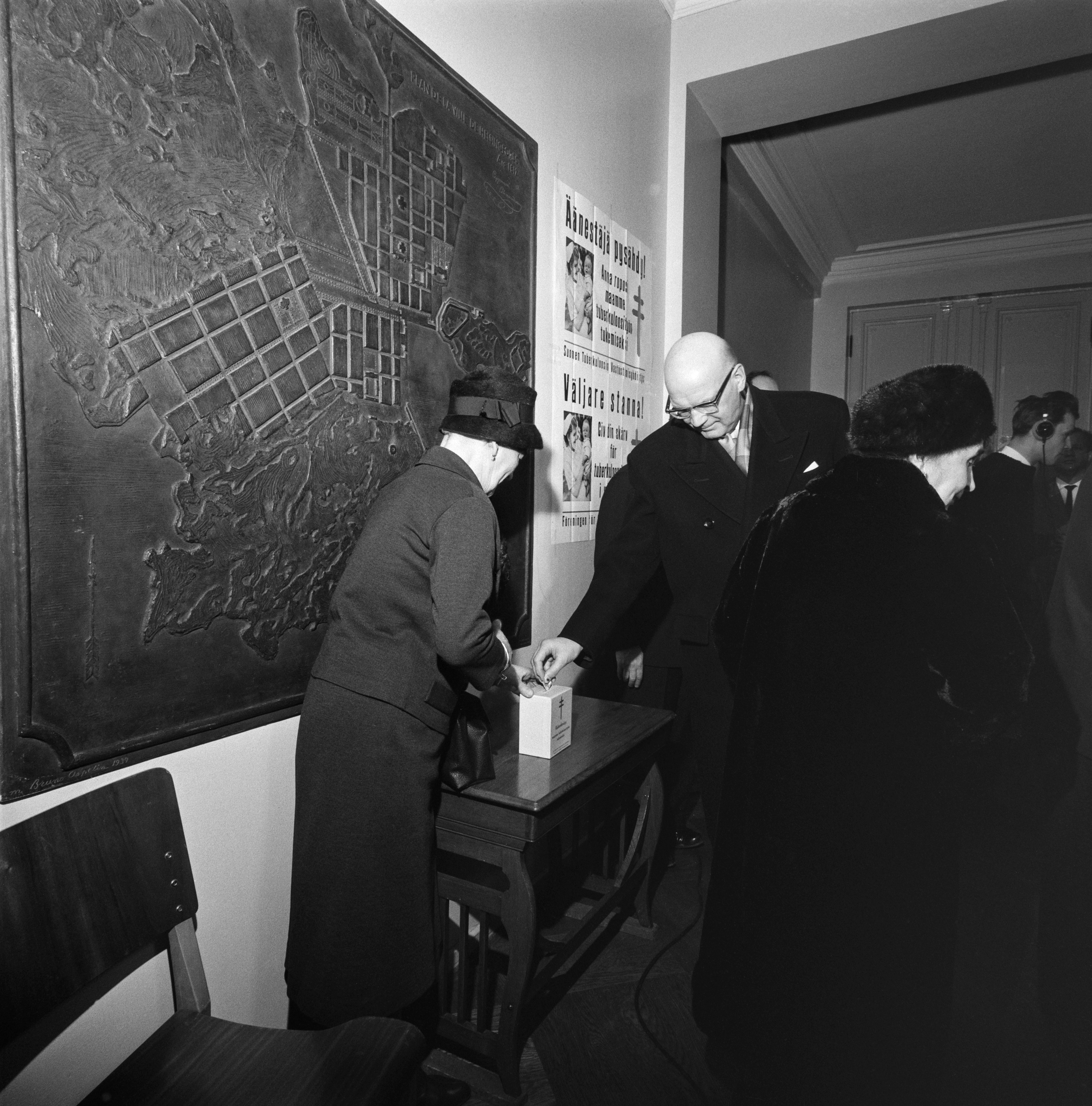
Urho Kekkonen casting his vote

=== Popular vote ===
Party or alliance		Votes	%	Seats
Electoral Union of Urho Kekkonen	Agrarian League	698,199	31.70	111
Electoral Union of Urho Kekkonen	People's Party	165,489	7.51	21
Electoral Union of Urho Kekkonen	Swedish People's Party	35,599	1.62	6
Electoral Union of Urho Kekkonen	Others	75,961	3.45	7
Electoral Union of Urho Kekkonen	Total	975,248	44.29	145
Electoral Union of KOK and KP	National Coalition Party	288,912	13.12	37
Electoral Union of KOK and KP	People's Party	11,087	0.50	1
Electoral Union of KOK and KP	Liberal League	7,898	0.36	1
Electoral Union of KOK and KP	Total	307,897	13.98	39
Finnish People's Democratic League		451,750	20.51	63
Social Democratic Party		289,366	13.14	36
Swedish People's Party		111,741	5.07	15
Social Democratic Union of Workers and Smallholders		66,166	3.00	2
Others		36	0.00	0
Total		2,202,204	100.00	300
Valid votes		2,202,204	99.58	
Invalid/blank votes		9,237	0.42	
Total votes		2,211,441	100.00	
Registered voters/turnout		2,714,883	81.46	
Source: Nohln & Stöver

=== Electoral college ===
Candidate	Party	Votes	%
Urho Kekkonen	Agrarian League	199	66.33
Paavo Aitio	Finnish People's Democratic League	62	20.67
Rafael Paasio	Social Democratic Party	37	12.33
Emil Skog	Social Democratic Union of Workers and Smallholders	2	0.67
Total		300	100.00
Source: Nohlen & Stöver
