= Kusti Kulo =

Finnish politician (1887–1973)

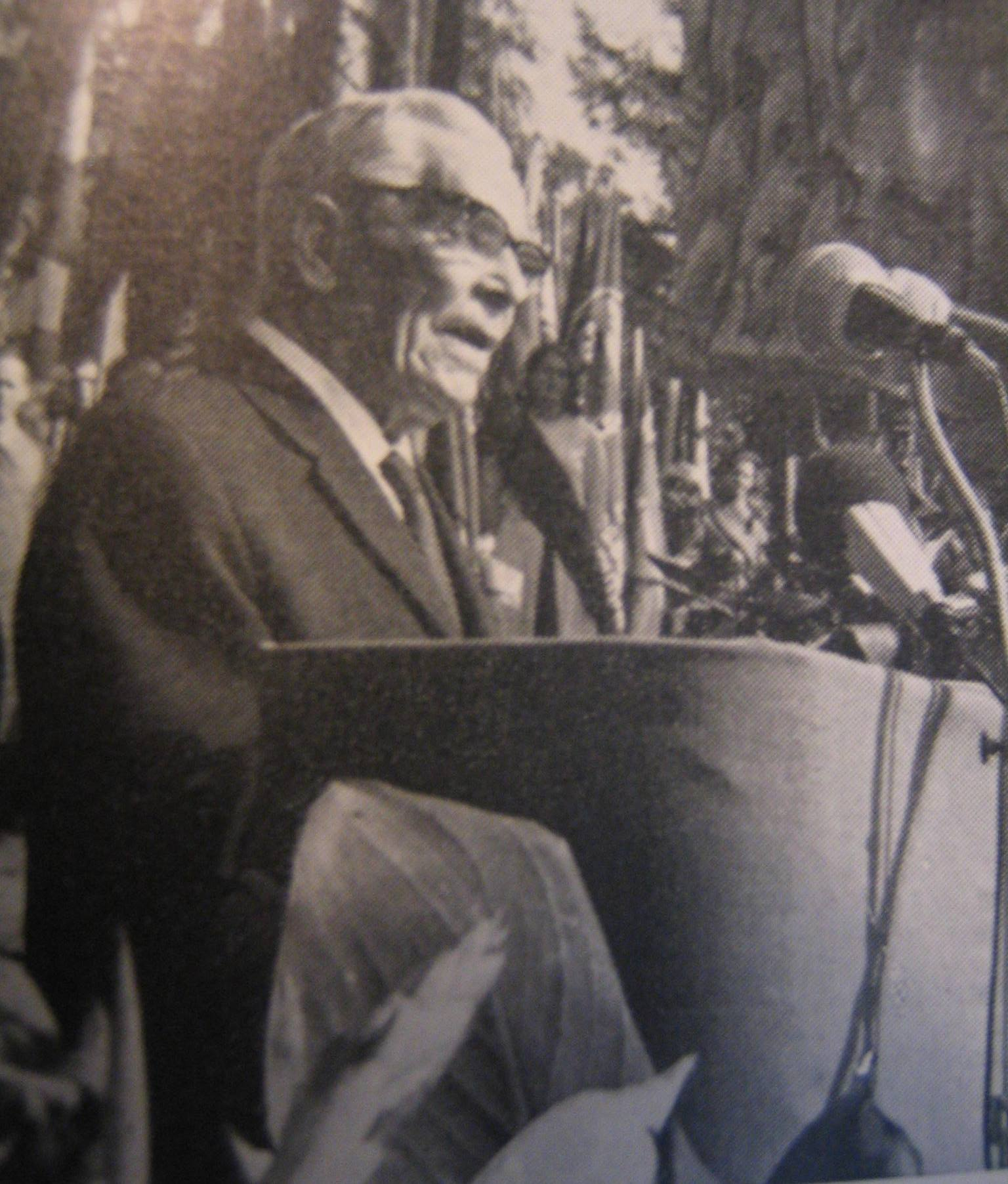
- Kusti Kulo in 1970
- Born: November 17, 1887; Hämeenlinna, Grand Duchy of Finland
- Died: April 13, 1973 (aged 85); Helsinki, Finland
- Occupation: Politician
- Years active: 1921–1966
- Political party: Social Democratic Party of Finland, Socialist Workers' Party of Finland, Socialist Unity Party, Finnish People's Democratic League

Gustav (Kusti) Ludvig Kulo (born Källberg, 17 November 1887 – 13 April 1973) was a Finnish politician who was the chairman of the Finnish People's Democratic League 1948–1966.

== Career ==
Kulo was a railroad worker in Tampere since 1902. During the 1905 general strike, he joined the national railroad workers union and was later selected it's executive committee. In the 1918 Civil War, Kulo was the commissar of Tampere station and a member of the Red Guards general staff of the Tavastia Front. He was injured in the explosion accident that killed the commander-in-chief Hugo Salmela. Kulo was arrested after the Battle of Tampere and sentenced for seven years.

After paroled in 1921, Kulo joined the communist movement and eventually became the party secretary of the Socialist Workers' Party of Finland. He was also a member of the illegal Communist Party of Finland. Kulo was arrested in the 1923 communist raids and imprisoned until 1928. During his sentence Kulo distanced from communism and joined the democratic socialist Left Group of Finnish Workers. Since the late 1930s, Kulo was a member of the Social Democratic Party. During the Continuation War, Kulo was active in its "peace opposition" against Finland's war policy and the party leader Väinö Tanner. After the war, Kulo was the chairman of Socialist Unity Party 1947-1948 and People's Democratic League 1948–1966.
