= Emil Skog =

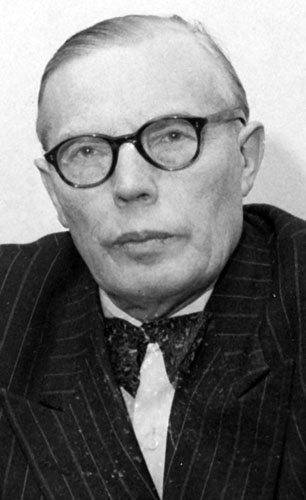
Emil Skog in 1957.

Emil Albert Skog (30 June 1897, Helsingin maalaiskunta – 20 September 1981, Helsinki) was a Finnish telephone worker, civil servant and politician. During the Finnish Civil War, Skog fought at the Battle of Tampere as an artilleryman on the Red side and was imprisoned at the Kalevankangas camp after Tampere surrendered on 6 April 1918.

From 1946 to 1957, Skog was the chairman of the Social Democratic Party of Finland (SDP). He served as Minister of Defence of Finland from 29 July 1948 to 17 March 1950, from 17 January 1951 to 9 July 1953 and from 5 May 1954 to 27 May 1957.

From 1959 to 1964, Skog was the chairman of the Social Democratic Union of Workers and Smallholders (TPSL). He became a member of the editorial board of the leftist newspaper Päivän Sanomat in 1959. He rejoined the SDP in 1964.
