= Central Finland (parliamentary electoral district) =

Electoral district of the Parliament of Finland

- Keski-Suomi; Mellersta Finland
- Electoral District for the Parliament of Finland
- Location of Central Finland within Finland
- Municipality: List: Äänekoski; Hankasalmi; Jämsä; Joutsa; Jyväskylä; Kannonkoski; Karstula; Keuruu; Kinnula; Kivijärvi; Konnevesi; Kyyjärvi; Laukaa; Luhanka; Multia; Muurame; Petäjävesi; Pihtipudas; Saarijärvi; Toivakka; Uurainen; Viitasaari
- Region: Central Finland
- Population: 272,521 (2022)
- Electorate: 226,335 (2023)
- Area: 19,012 km^{2} (2022)

Current Electoral District
- Created: 1907
- Seats: List: 10 (1972–present); 11 (1962–1972); 12 (1951–1962); 11 (1945–1951); 10 (1917–1945); 11 (1917–1917)
- Members of Parliament: List: Bella Forsgrén (Vihr); Kaisa Garedew (PS); Petri Honkonen (Kesk); Tomi Immonen (PS); Anne Kalmari (Kesk); Jani Kokko (SDP); Riitta Mäkinen (SDP); Piritta Rantanen (SDP); Ville Väyrynen (Kok; Sinuhe Wallinheimo (Kok

Central Finland (Finnish: Keski-Suomi; Swedish: Mellersta Finland) is one of the 13 electoral districts of the Parliament of Finland, the national legislature of Finland. The district was established as Vaasa Province East (Finnish: Vaasan läänin itäinen vaalipiiri; Swedish: Vasa läns östra valkrets) in 1907 when the Diet of Finland was replaced by the Parliament of Finland. It was renamed Central Finland Province (Finnish: Keski-Suomen lääni; Swedish: Mellersta Finlands län) in 1960 and Central Finland in 1997. It is conterminous with the region of Central Finland. The district currently elects 10 of the 200 members of the Parliament of Finland using the open party-list proportional representation electoral system. At the 2023 parliamentary election it had 226,335 registered electors.

== History ==
Vaasa Province East was one 16 electoral districts established by the Election Act of the Grand Duchy of Finland (Suomen Suuriruhtinaanmaan Vaalilaki) passed by the Diet of Finland in 1906. It consisted of the hundreds (kihlakunta) of Kuortane and Laukaa in the province of Vaasa. The district's borders were redrawn in 1960 to be conterminous with the newly created Central Finland Province. The district was renamed Central Finland Province at the same time.

The district was renamed Central Finland in 1997. Kuhmoinen municipality was transferred from Central Finland to Pirkanmaa in 2021.

== Electoral system ==
Central Finland currently elects 10 of the 200 members of the Parliament of Finland using the open party-list proportional representation electoral system. Parties may form electoral alliances with each other to pool their votes and increase their chances of winning seats. However, the number of candidates nominated by an electoral alliance may not exceed the maximum number of candidates that a single party may nominate. Seats are allocated using the D'Hondt method.

== Election results ==
=== Summary ===
Election	Left Alliance Vas / SKDL / STPV / SSTP			Green League Vihr			Social Democrats SDP / SDTP / SDP			Swedish People's SFP			Centre Kesk / ML			Liberals Lib / LKP / SK / KE / NP			National Coalition Kok / SP			Christian Democrats KD / SKL			Finns PS / SMP / SPP		
Election	Votes	%	Seats	Votes	%	Seats	Votes	%	Seats	Votes	%	Seats	Votes	%	Seats	Votes	%	Seats	Votes	%	Seats	Votes	%	Seats	Votes	%	Seats
2023	9,991	6.52%	0	11,681	7.62%	1	34,956	22.81%	3	182	0.12%	0	27,194	17.74%	2				24,926	16.26%	2	8,103	5.29%	0	31,360	20.46%	2
2019	12,681	8.21%	1	17,639	11.43%	1	29,201	18.92%	2				30,597	19.82%	3				19,707	12.77%	1	8,774	5.68%	0	27,851	18.04%	2
2015	10,145	6.71%	0	13,599	8.99%	1	28,710	18.98%	2				40,729	26.92%	4				19,776	13.07%	1	6,656	4.40%	0	29,142	19.27%	2
2011	13,366	9.00%	1	9,601	6.47%	0	31,497	21.22%	2				32,362	21.80%	3				22,294	15.02%	2	9,571	6.45%	0	26,813	18.06%	2
2007	10,561	7.45%	1	9,859	6.95%	0	34,710	24.48%	3				47,058	33.19%	4	142	0.10%	0	21,008	14.81%	1	11,142	7.86%	1	3,616	2.55%	0
2003	13,199	9.49%	1	9,027	6.49%	0	35,480	25.52%	3				48,532	34.91%	4	162	0.12%	0	19,730	14.19%	1	10,278	7.39%	1	510	0.37%	0
1999	16,699	12.47%	1	7,038	5.26%	0	33,251	24.83%	3	247	0.18%	0	41,039	30.65%	4	230	0.17%	0	20,004	14.94%	1	10,770	8.04%	1	296	0.22%	0
1995	17,873	12.85%	1	8,413	6.05%	0	43,499	31.27%	4				35,566	25.57%	3	458	0.33%	0	18,364	13.20%	1	9,717	6.99%	1	937	0.67%	0
1991	15,760	11.30%	1	7,560	5.42%	0	34,787	24.95%	3				43,883	31.47%	3	372	0.27%	0	18,661	13.38%	1	7,197	5.16%	1	10,324	7.40%	1
1987	19,702	13.46%	1	5,158	3.52%	0	40,405	27.61%	3	266	0.18%	0	28,797	19.68%	2	971	0.66%	0	29,349	20.05%	2	5,272	3.60%	1	11,326	7.74%	1
1983	25,162	16.55%	2	1,740	1.14%	0	46,538	30.61%	3	404	0.27%	0	32,448	21.35%	3				27,792	18.28%	2	6,249	4.11%	0	11,559	7.60%	0
1979	30,349	20.39%	2				41,365	27.79%	3				33,094	22.23%	2	2,514	1.69%	0	24,365	16.37%	2	10,394	6.98%	1	5,861	3.94%	0
1975	28,702	20.05%	2				40,959	28.62%	3				31,426	21.96%	3	3,604	2.52%	0	19,476	13.61%	2	5,977	4.18%	0	6,096	4.26%	0
1972	24,476	18.44%	2				37,275	28.08%	3				26,060	19.63%	2	4,448	3.35%	0	18,095	13.63%	1	4,291	3.23%	1	16,107	12.13%	1
1970	23,479	17.83%	2				32,123	24.40%	3				26,831	20.38%	3	7,101	5.39%	0	17,240	13.09%	2	3,194	2.43%	0	16,582	12.59%	1
1966	27,094	22.02%	2				35,137	28.55%	4				32,746	26.61%	3	6,992	5.68%	0	12,800	10.40%	1				666	0.54%	0
1962	27,664	22.82%	3				27,360	22.56%	2				31,996	26.39%	3	5,797	4.78%	1	12,894	10.63%	1				2,903	2.39%	0
1958	24,675	22.31%	3				29,593	26.75%	3				38,136	34.48%	4	3,442	3.11%	1	14,101	12.75%	1						
1954	23,700	20.49%	2				34,344	29.70%	4				39,528	34.18%	4	4,010	3.47%	1	14,038	12.14%	1						
1951	20,993	20.32%	2				31,418	30.41%	4				33,223	32.15%	5	2,335	2.26%	0	13,590	13.15%	1						
1948	18,951	19.34%	2				29,837	30.46%	3				33,047	33.73%	4	1,934	1.97%	0	13,635	13.92%	2						
1945	23,413	27.74%	3				22,547	26.71%	3				24,583	29.13%	3	2,063	2.44%	1	10,951	12.97%	1						
1939							29,135	45.54%	5				19,543	30.55%	4	2,080	3.25%	0	7,233	11.31%	1						
1936							27,459	45.50%	6				17,954	29.75%	3	3,966	6.57%	0	3,761	6.23%	0						
1933							26,587	45.72%	5				15,791	27.15%	3	3,180	5.47%	1	8,602	14.79%	1						
1930							24,638	43.54%	5				17,117	30.25%	3	4,002	7.07%	1	7,802	13.79%	1						
1929	3,453	7.18%	0				20,812	43.28%	6				13,489	28.05%	3	2,498	5.20%	0	5,428	11.29%	1						
1927	2,812	6.03%	0				22,543	48.35%	6				12,135	26.03%	3	3,175	6.81%	0	5,895	12.64%	1						
1924	1,746	3.97%	0				21,967	49.98%	6				10,107	23.00%	2	4,258	9.69%	1	5,794	13.18%	1						
1922	3,720	8.74%	1				18,603	43.70%	5				11,033	25.92%	2	3,930	9.23%	1	5,210	12.24%	1						
1919							24,078	49.36%	6				14,973	30.69%	3	3,507	7.19%	0	5,736	11.76%	1						
1917							26,106	53.49%	6				9,638	19.75%	2				12,879	26.39%	2						
1916							23,032	58.84%	7				4,810	12.29%	1	3,748	9.58%	1	7,477	19.10%	2						
1913							19,426	54.16%	6				4,059	11.32%	1	3,503	9.77%	1	8,794	24.52%	3						
1911							20,947	50.66%	6				4,149	10.03%	1	5,182	12.53%	1	10,338	25.00%	3						
1910							19,843	50.99%	6				3,694	9.49%	1	5,341	13.73%	1	9,307	23.92%	3						
1909							22,925	51.74%	6				3,667	8.28%	1	5,854	13.21%	1	10,877	24.55%	3						
1908							19,286	47.21%	6				2,830	6.93%	0	6,233	15.26%	2	11,495	28.14%	3						
1907							22,029	48.15%	6				867	1.89%	0	8,123	17.75%	2	14,238	31.12%	3						

(Figures in italics represent joint lists.)

=== Detailed ===
==== 2020s ====
===== 2023 =====
Results of the 2023 parliamentary election held on 2 April 2023:

Party		Party			Electoral Alliance		
Party		Votes	%	Seats	Votes	%	Seats
Social Democratic Party of Finland	SDP	34,956	22.81%	3	34,956	22.81%	3
Finns Party	PS	31,360	20.46%	2	31,360	20.46%	2
Centre Party	Kesk	27,194	17.74%	2	27,194	17.74%	2
National Coalition Party	Kok	24,926	16.26%	2	24,926	16.26%	2
Green League	Vihr	11,681	7.62%	1	11,681	7.62%	1
Left Alliance	Vas	9,991	6.52%	0	9,991	6.52%	0
Christian Democrats	KD	8,103	5.29%	0	8,103	5.29%	0
Movement Now	Liik	2,044	1.33%	0	2,044	1.33%	0
Freedom Alliance	VL	1,326	0.87%	0	1,545	1.01%	0
Crystal Party	KRIP	219	0.14%	0	1,545	1.01%	0
Power Belongs to the People	VKK	594	0.39%	0	594	0.39%	0
Blue-and-Black Movement	SML	249	0.16%	0	249	0.16%	0
Communist Party of Finland	SKP	240	0.16%	0	240	0.16%	0
Pirate Party	Pir	189	0.12%	0	189	0.12%	0
Swedish People's Party of Finland	SFP	182	0.12%	0	182	0.12%	0
Valid votes		153,254	100.00%	10	153,254	100.00%	10
Rejected votes		733	0.48%				
Total polled		153,987	68.03%				
Registered electors		226,335					

The following candidates were elected: Bella Forsgrén (Vihr), 5,787 votes; Kaisa Garedew (PS), 5,118 votes; Petri Honkonen (Kesk), 6,294 votes; Tomi Immonen (PS), 5,293 votes; Anne Kalmari (Kesk), 6,885 votes; Jani Kokko (SDP), 4,890 votes; Riitta Mäkinen (SDP), 9,712 votes; Piritta Rantanen (SDP), 4,753 votes; Ville Väyrynen (Kok), 7,169 votes; and Sinuhe Wallinheimo (Kok), 7,478 votes.

==== 2010s ====
===== 2019 =====
Results of the 2019 parliamentary election held on 14 April 2019:

Party		Votes	%	Seats
Centre Party	Kesk	30,597	19.82%	3
Social Democratic Party of Finland	SDP	29,201	18.92%	2
Finns Party	PS	27,851	18.04%	2
National Coalition Party	Kok	19,707	12.77%	1
Green League	Vihr	17,639	11.43%	1
Left Alliance	Vas	12,681	8.21%	1
Christian Democrats	KD	8,774	5.68%	0
Movement Now	Liik	4,269	2.77%	0
Pirate Party	Pir	1,239	0.80%	0
Blue Reform	SIN	705	0.46%	0
Seven Star Movement	TL	389	0.25%	0
Citizens' Party	KP	350	0.23%	0
Communist Party of Finland	SKP	344	0.22%	0
Feminist Party	FP	210	0.14%	0
Animal Justice Party of Finland	EOP	168	0.11%	0
Petri Hirvimäki (Independent)		148	0.10%	0
Finnish People First	SKE	56	0.04%	0
Communist Workers' Party – For Peace and Socialism	KTP	47	0.03%	0
Valid votes		154,375	100.00%	10
Rejected votes		862	0.56%	
Total polled		155,237	68.29%	
Registered electors		227,335		

The following candidates were elected: Bella Forsgrén (Vihr), 4,354 votes; Teuvo Hakkarainen (PS), 8,036 votes; Petri Honkonen (Kesk), 4,639 votes; Anne Kalmari (Kesk), 8,192 votes; Juho Kautto (Vas), 3,866 votes; Joonas Könttä (Kesk), 3,303 votes; Jouni Kotiaho (PS), 2,881 votes; Riitta Mäkinen (SDP), 8,916 votes; Piritta Rantanen (SDP), 3,309 votes; and Sinuhe Wallinheimo (Kok), 6,695 votes.

===== 2015 =====
Results of the 2015 parliamentary election held on 19 April 2015:

Party		Votes	%	Seats
Centre Party	Kesk	40,729	26.92%	4
True Finns	PS	29,142	19.27%	2
Social Democratic Party of Finland	SDP	28,710	18.98%	2
National Coalition Party	Kok	19,776	13.07%	1
Green League	Vihr	13,599	8.99%	1
Left Alliance	Vas	10,145	6.71%	0
Christian Democrats	KD	6,656	4.40%	0
Pirate Party	Pir	1,264	0.84%	0
Communist Party of Finland	SKP	639	0.42%	0
Independence Party	IPU	379	0.25%	0
Change 2011		86	0.06%	0
Tero Poikolainen (Independent)		61	0.04%	0
Workers' Party of Finland	STP	35	0.02%	0
Communist Workers' Party – For Peace and Socialism	KTP	31	0.02%	0
Risto Hintikka (Independent)		17	0.01%	0
Valid votes		151,269	100.00%	10
Rejected votes		637	0.42%	
Total polled		151,906	67.16%	
Registered electors		226,176		

The following candidates were elected: Touko Aalto (Vihr), 4,326 votes; Teuvo Hakkarainen (PS), 5,557 votes; Petri Honkonen (Kesk), 2,978 votes; Susanna Huovinen (SDP), 5,003 votes; Lauri Ihalainen (SDP), 10,354 votes; Anne Kalmari (Kesk), 10,216 votes; Toimi Kankaanniemi (PS), 6,511 votes; Aila Paloniemi (Kesk), 3,861 votes; Mauri Pekkarinen (Kesk), 9,170 votes; and Sinuhe Wallinheimo (Kok), 5,483 votes.

===== 2011 =====
Results of the 2011 parliamentary election held on 17 April 2011:

Party		Votes	%	Seats
Centre Party	Kesk	32,362	21.80%	3
Social Democratic Party of Finland	SDP	31,497	21.22%	2
True Finns	PS	26,813	18.06%	2
National Coalition Party	Kok	22,294	15.02%	2
Left Alliance	Vas	13,366	9.00%	1
Green League	Vihr	9,601	6.47%	0
Christian Democrats	KD	9,571	6.45%	0
Pirate Party	Pir	1,235	0.83%	0
Communist Party of Finland	SKP	802	0.54%	0
Senior Citizens' Party		426	0.29%	0
Change 2011		239	0.16%	0
Independence Party	IPU	120	0.08%	0
Workers' Party of Finland	STP	37	0.02%	0
Communist Workers' Party – For Peace and Socialism	KTP	35	0.02%	0
Freedom Party – Finland's Future	VP	35	0.02%	0
Valid votes		148,433	100.00%	10
Rejected votes		778	0.52%	
Total polled		149,211	66.57%	
Registered electors		224,150		

The following candidates were elected: Teuvo Hakkarainen (PS), 3,371 votes; Susanna Huovinen (SDP), 8,271 votes; Anne Kalmari (Kesk), 9,288 votes; Aila Paloniemi (Kesk), 4,146 votes; Mauri Pekkarinen (Kesk), 7,112 votes; Tuula Peltonen (SDP), 3,481 votes; Eila Tiainen (Vas), 3,955 votes; Kauko Tuupainen (PS), 4,977 votes; Henna Virkkunen (Kok), 7,127 votes; and Sinuhe Wallinheimo (Kok), 4,228 votes.

==== 2000s ====
===== 2007 =====
Results of the 2007 parliamentary election held on 18 March 2007:

Party		Party			Electoral Alliance		
Party		Votes	%	Seats	Votes	%	Seats
Centre Party	Kesk	47,058	33.19%	4	47,058	33.19%	4
Social Democratic Party of Finland	SDP	34,710	24.48%	3	34,710	24.48%	3
National Coalition Party	Kok	21,008	14.81%	1	21,008	14.81%	1
Christian Democrats	KD	11,142	7.86%	1	11,142	7.86%	1
Left Alliance	Vas	10,561	7.45%	1	10,561	7.45%	1
Green League	Vihr	9,859	6.95%	0	9,859	6.95%	0
True Finns	PS	3,616	2.55%	0	3,900	2.75%	0
Independence Party	IPU	284	0.20%	0	3,900	2.75%	0
Communist Party of Finland	SKP	2,368	1.67%	0	2,368	1.67%	0
Pensioners for People		913	0.64%	0	913	0.64%	0
Liberals	Lib	142	0.10%	0	142	0.10%	0
Communist Workers' Party – For Peace and Socialism	KTP	97	0.07%	0	97	0.07%	0
Workers' Party of Finland	STP	45	0.03%	0	45	0.03%	0
Valid votes		141,803	100.00%	10	141,803	100.00%	10
Rejected votes		901	0.63%				
Total polled		142,704	64.97%				
Registered electors		219,648					

The following candidates were elected: Susanna Huovinen (SDP), 8,365 votes; Anne Kalmari (Kesk), 8,266 votes; Matti Kangas (Vas), 4,539 votes; Toimi Kankaanniemi (KD), 5,116 votes; Reijo Laitinen (SDP), 5,111 votes; Lauri Oinonen (Kesk), 4,621 votes; Aila Paloniemi (Kesk), 5,461 votes; Mauri Pekkarinen (Kesk), 9,102 votes; Tuula Peltonen (SDP), 5,382 votes; and Henna Virkkunen (Kok), 6,133 votes.

===== 2003 =====
Results of the 2003 parliamentary election held on 16 March 2003:

Party		Party			Electoral Alliance		
Party		Votes	%	Seats	Votes	%	Seats
Centre Party	Kesk	48,532	34.91%	4	48,532	34.91%	4
Social Democratic Party of Finland	SDP	35,480	25.52%	3	35,480	25.52%	3
National Coalition Party	Kok	19,730	14.19%	1	19,730	14.19%	1
Left Alliance	Vas	13,199	9.49%	1	13,199	9.49%	1
Christian Democrats	KD	10,278	7.39%	1	10,950	7.88%	1
True Finns	PS	510	0.37%	0	10,950	7.88%	1
Liberals	Lib	162	0.12%	0	10,950	7.88%	1
Green League	Vihr	9,027	6.49%	0	9,027	6.49%	0
Communist Party of Finland	SKP	1,678	1.21%	0	1,678	1.21%	0
Forces for Change in Finland		345	0.25%	0	345	0.25%	0
Communist Workers' Party – For Peace and Socialism	KTP	83	0.06%	0	83	0.06%	0
Valid votes		139,024	100.00%	10	139,024	100.00%	10
Rejected votes		1,158	0.83%				
Total polled		140,182	65.40%				
Registered electors		214,345					

The following candidates were elected: Susanna Huovinen (SDP), 8,400 votes; Matti Kangas (Vas), 4,233 votes; Toimi Kankaanniemi (KD), 6,435 votes; Reijo Laitinen (SDP), 7,158 votes; Petri Neittaanmäki (Kesk), 5,300 votes; Lauri Oinonen (Kesk), 6,686 votes; Kalevi Olin (SDP), 4,750 votes; Aila Paloniemi (Kesk), 4,887 votes; Mauri Pekkarinen (Kesk), 12,164 votes; and Ahti Vielma (Kok), 4,272 votes.

==== 1990s ====
===== 1999 =====
Results of the 1999 parliamentary election held on 21 March 1999:

Party		Party			Electoral Alliance		
Party		Votes	%	Seats	Votes	%	Seats
Centre Party	Kesk	41,039	30.65%	4	41,286	30.83%	4
Swedish People's Party of Finland	SFP	247	0.18%	0	41,286	30.83%	4
Social Democratic Party of Finland	SDP	33,251	24.83%	3	33,251	24.83%	3
National Coalition Party	Kok	20,004	14.94%	1	20,004	14.94%	1
Left Alliance	Vas	16,699	12.47%	1	16,699	12.47%	1
Finnish Christian League	SKL	10,770	8.04%	1	12,416	9.27%	1
Reform Group	Rem	845	0.63%	0	12,416	9.27%	1
True Finns	PS	296	0.22%	0	12,416	9.27%	1
Alliance for Free Finland	VSL	275	0.21%	0	12,416	9.27%	1
Liberal People's Party	LKP	230	0.17%	0	12,416	9.27%	1
Green League	Vihr	7,038	5.26%	0	8,791	6.56%	0
Young Finns	Nuors	1,753	1.31%	0	8,791	6.56%	0
Communist Party of Finland	SKP	1,057	0.79%	0	1,310	0.98%	0
Kirjava ”Puolue” – Elonkehän Puolesta	KIPU	182	0.14%	0	1,310	0.98%	0
Communist Workers' Party – For Peace and Socialism	KTP	71	0.05%	0	1,310	0.98%	0
Natural Law Party	LLP	156	0.12%	0	156	0.12%	0
Valid votes		133,913	100.00%	10	133,913	100.00%	10
Rejected votes		1,439	1.06%				
Total polled		135,352	65.04%				
Registered electors		208,098					

The following candidates were elected: Susanna Huovinen (SDP), 4,382 votes; Matti Kangas (Vas), 2,900 votes; Toimi Kankaanniemi (KD), 8,141 votes; Juha Karpio (Kok), 4,893 votes; Reijo Laitinen (SDP), 7,008 votes; Johannes Leppänen (Kesk), 5,690 votes; Petri Neittaanmäki (Kesk), 5,787 votes; Lauri Oinonen (Kesk), 6,760 votes; Kalevi Olin (SDP), 4,617 votes; and Mauri Pekkarinen (Kesk), 9,633 votes.

===== 1995 =====
Results of the 1995 parliamentary election held on 19 March 1995:

Party		Party			Electoral Alliance		
Party		Votes	%	Seats	Votes	%	Seats
Social Democratic Party of Finland	SDP	43,499	31.27%	4	43,499	31.27%	4
Centre Party	Kesk	35,566	25.57%	3	35,566	25.57%	3
National Coalition Party	Kok	18,364	13.20%	1	18,364	13.20%	1
Left Alliance	Vas	17,873	12.85%	1	17,873	12.85%	1
Finnish Christian League	SKL	9,717	6.99%	1	11,712	8.42%	1
Finnish Rural Party	SMP	937	0.67%	0	11,712	8.42%	1
Women's Party	NAISP	600	0.43%	0	11,712	8.42%	1
Liberal People's Party	LKP	458	0.33%	0	11,712	8.42%	1
Green League	Vihr	8,413	6.05%	0	8,413	6.05%	0
Young Finns	Nuor	2,180	1.57%	0	2,180	1.57%	0
Alliance for Free Finland	VSL	1,202	0.86%	0	1,202	0.86%	0
Natural Law Party	LLP	140	0.10%	0	140	0.10%	0
Communist Workers' Party – For Peace and Socialism	KTP	102	0.07%	0	102	0.07%	0
Ecological Party the Greens	EKO	57	0.04%	0	57	0.04%	0
Valid votes		139,108	100.00%	10	139,108	100.00%	10
Rejected votes		1,052	0.75%				
Total polled		140,160	68.72%				
Registered electors		203,953					

The following candidates were elected: Toimi Kankaanniemi (SKL), 8,022 votes; Juha Karpio (Kok), 5,472 votes; Reijo Laitinen (SDP), 8,744 votes; Johannes Leppänen (Kesk), 7,283 votes; Pekka Leppänen (Vas), 4,366 votes; Kalevi Olin (SDP), 4,512 votes; Erkki Partanen (SDP), 4,861 votes; Mauri Pekkarinen (Kesk), 10,265 votes; Aino Suhola (Kesk), 6,405 votes; and Marja-Leena Viljamaa (SDP), 5,291 votes.

===== 1991 =====
Results of the 1991 parliamentary election held on 17 March 1991:

Party		Party			Electoral Alliance		
Party		Votes	%	Seats	Votes	%	Seats
Centre Party	Kesk	43,883	31.47%	3	51,452	36.90%	4
Finnish Christian League	SKL	7,197	5.16%	1	51,452	36.90%	4
Liberal People's Party	LKP	372	0.27%	0	51,452	36.90%	4
Social Democratic Party of Finland	SDP	34,787	24.95%	3	34,787	24.95%	3
National Coalition Party	Kok	18,661	13.38%	1	18,661	13.38%	1
Left Alliance	Vas	15,760	11.30%	1	15,760	11.30%	1
Finnish Rural Party	SMP	10,324	7.40%	1	10,680	7.66%	1
The Greens	EKO	356	0.26%	0	10,680	7.66%	1
Green League	Vihr	7,560	5.42%	0	7,560	5.42%	0
Women's Party	NAISL	272	0.20%	0	272	0.20%	0
Humanity Party		153	0.11%	0	153	0.11%	0
Communist Workers' Party – For Peace and Socialism	KTP	124	0.09%	0	124	0.09%	0
Valid votes		139,449	100.00%	10	139,449	100.00%	10
Blank votes		1,162	0.82%				
Rejected Votess – Other		736	0.52%				
Total polled		141,347	70.01%				
Registered electors		201,908					

The following candidates were elected: Iiris Hacklin (SDP), 6,334 votes; Toimi Kankaanniemi (SKL), 7,197 votes; Matti Lahtinen (Kok), 3,253 votes; Reijo Laitinen (SDP), 5,650 votes; Johannes Leppänen (Kesk), 6,492 votes; Pekka Leppänen (Vas), 5,604 votes; Tina Mäkelä (SMP), 7,895 votes; Mauri Pekkarinen (Kesk), 10,306 votes; Aino Suhola (Kesk), 5,345 votes; and Marja-Leena Viljamaa (SDP), 3,627 votes.

==== 1980s ====
===== 1987 =====
Results of the 1987 parliamentary election held on 15 and 16 March 1987:

Party		Party			Electoral Alliance		
Party		Votes	%	Seats	Votes	%	Seats
Social Democratic Party of Finland	SDP	40,405	27.61%	3	40,405	27.61%	3
Centre Party	Kesk	28,797	19.68%	2	35,306	24.12%	3
Finnish Christian League	SKL	5,272	3.60%	1	35,306	24.12%	3
Liberal People's Party	LKP	971	0.66%	0	35,306	24.12%	3
Swedish People's Party of Finland	SFP	266	0.18%	0	35,306	24.12%	3
National Coalition Party	Kok	29,349	20.05%	2	29,349	20.05%	2
Finnish People's Democratic League	SKDL	19,702	13.46%	1	19,702	13.46%	1
Finnish Rural Party	SMP	11,326	7.74%	1	11,326	7.74%	1
Green League	Vihr	5,158	3.52%	0	5,158	3.52%	0
Democratic Alternative	DEVA	3,594	2.46%	0	3,594	2.46%	0
Pensioners' Party	SEP	1,518	1.04%	0	1,518	1.04%	0
Valid votes		146,358	100.00%	10	146,358	100.00%	10
Rejected votes		955	0.65%				
Total polled		147,313	73.67%				
Registered electors		199,971					

The following candidates were elected: Iiris Hacklin (SDP), 5,974 votes; Pirkko Ikonen (Kesk), 7,178 votes; Toimi Kankaanniemi (SKL), 5,122 votes; Sakari Knuuttila (SDP), 5,121 votes; Matti Lahtinen (Kok), 3,205 votes; Pekka Leppänen (SKDL), 6,280 votes; Tina Mäkelä (SMP), 2,697 votes; Tuula Paavilainen (SDP), 5,798 votes; Mauri Pekkarinen (Kesk), 8,555 votes; and Helena Pesola (Kok), 8,881 votes.

===== 1983 =====
Results of the 1983 parliamentary election held on 20 and 21 March 1983:

Party		Party			Electoral Alliance		
Party		Votes	%	Seats	Votes	%	Seats
Social Democratic Party of Finland	SDP	46,538	30.61%	3	46,538	30.61%	3
Centre Party and Liberal People's Party	Kesk-LKP	32,448	21.35%	3	39,101	25.72%	3
Finnish Christian League	SKL	6,249	4.11%	0	39,101	25.72%	3
Swedish People's Party of Finland	SFP	404	0.27%	0	39,101	25.72%	3
National Coalition Party	Kok	27,792	18.28%	2	27,792	18.28%	2
Finnish People's Democratic League	SKDL	25,162	16.55%	2	25,162	16.55%	2
Finnish Rural Party	SMP	11,559	7.60%	0	11,559	7.60%	0
Joint List A (Green League)		1,740	1.14%	0	1,740	1.14%	0
Union for Democracy	KVL	123	0.08%	0	123	0.08%	0
Valid votes		152,015	100.00%	10	152,015	100.00%	10
Rejected votes		879	0.57%				
Total polled		152,894	77.29%				
Registered electors		197,828					

The following candidates were elected: Tuula Hautamäki (SDP), 5,676 votes; Inger Hirvelä (SKDL), 7,441 votes; Pirkko Ikonen (Kesk), 9,177 votes; Matti Jaatinen (Kok), 6,388 votes; Sakari Knuuttila (SDP), 5,713 votes; Pekka Leppänen (SKDL), 9,100 votes; Mauri Pekkarinen (Kesk), 8,252 votes; Helena Pesola (Kok), 7,940 votes; Juhani Surakka (SDP), 5,986 votes; and Paavo Vesterinen (Kesk), 6,535 votes.

==== 1970s ====
===== 1979 =====
Results of the 1979 parliamentary election held on 18 and 19 March 1979:

Party		Party			Electoral Alliance		
Party		Votes	%	Seats	Votes	%	Seats
Social Democratic Party of Finland	SDP	41,365	27.79%	3	41,365	27.79%	3
Centre Party	Kesk	33,094	22.23%	2	35,608	23.92%	2
Liberal People's Party	LKP	2,514	1.69%	0	35,608	23.92%	2
Finnish People's Democratic League	SKDL	30,349	20.39%	2	30,349	20.39%	2
National Coalition Party	Kok	24,365	16.37%	2	24,365	16.37%	2
Finnish Christian League	SKL	10,394	6.98%	1	16,775	11.27%	1
Finnish Rural Party	SMP	5,861	3.94%	0	16,775	11.27%	1
Constitutional People's Party	PKP	520	0.35%	0	16,775	11.27%	1
Finnish People's Unity Party	SKYP	397	0.27%	0	397	0.27%	0
Valid votes		148,859	100.00%	10	148,859	100.00%	10
Rejected votes		749	0.50%				
Total polled		149,608	77.29%				
Registered electors		193,565					

The following candidates were elected: Inger Hirvelä (SKDL), 7,917 votes; Matti Jaatinen (Kok), 7,054 votes; Kalevi Kivistö (SKDL), 7,581 votes; Sakari Knuuttila (SDP), 5,469 votes; Mauri Pekkarinen (Kesk), 7,824 votes; Helena Pesola (Kok), 4,783 votes; Väinö Rautiainen (SKL), 6,390 votes; Juhani Surakka (SDP), 8,419 votes; Hannu Tapiola (SDP), 5,839 votes; and Paavo Vesterinen (Kesk), 5,042 votes.

===== 1975 =====
Results of the 1975 parliamentary election held on 21 and 22 September 1975:

Party		Party			Electoral Alliance		
Party		Votes	%	Seats	Votes	%	Seats
Social Democratic Party of Finland	SDP	40,959	28.62%	3	40,959	28.62%	3
Centre Party	Kesk	31,426	21.96%	3	35,030	24.48%	3
Liberal People's Party	LKP	3,604	2.52%	0	35,030	24.48%	3
National Coalition Party	Kok	19,476	13.61%	2	30,858	21.56%	2
Finnish Christian League	SKL	5,977	4.18%	0	30,858	21.56%	2
Finnish People's Unity Party	SKYP	5,405	3.78%	0	30,858	21.56%	2
Finnish People's Democratic League	SKDL	28,702	20.05%	2	28,702	20.05%	2
Finnish Rural Party	SMP	6,096	4.26%	0	6,645	4.64%	0
Party of Finnish Entrepreneurs	SYP	312	0.22%	0	6,645	4.64%	0
Finnish Constitutional People's Party	SPK	237	0.17%	0	6,645	4.64%	0
Socialist Workers Party	STP	931	0.65%	0	931	0.65%	0
Valid votes		143,125	100.00%	10	143,125	100.00%	10
Rejected votes		656	0.46%				
Total polled		143,781	76.27%				
Registered electors		188,523					

The following candidates were elected: Arvo Ahonen (SDP), 5,532 votes; Esko Härkönen (Kesk), 4,803 votes; Matti Jaatinen (Kok), 6,652 votes; Kalevi Kivistö (SKDL), 8,203 votes; Sakari Knuuttila (SDP), 5,415 votes; Siiri Lehmonen (SKDL), 5,038 votes; Sylvi Saimo (Kesk), 4,246 votes; Pentti Sillantaus (Kok), 7,072 votes; Juhani Surakka (SDP), 5,771 votes; and Paavo Vesterinen (Kesk), 5,133 votes.

===== 1972 =====
Results of the 1972 parliamentary election held on 2 and 3 January 1972:

Party		Party			Electoral Alliance		
Party		Votes	%	Seats	Votes	%	Seats
Social Democratic Party of Finland	SDP	37,275	28.08%	3	37,275	28.08%	3
Centre Party	Kesk	26,060	19.63%	2	30,508	22.98%	2
Liberal People's Party	LKP	4,448	3.35%	0	30,508	22.98%	2
Finnish People's Democratic League	SKDL	24,476	18.44%	2	24,476	18.44%	2
National Coalition Party	Kok	18,095	13.63%	1	18,095	13.63%	1
Finnish Rural Party	SMP	16,107	12.13%	1	16,107	12.13%	1
Finnish Christian League	SKL	4,291	3.23%	1	4,291	3.23%	1
Social Democratic Union of Workers and Smallholders	TPSL	1,996	1.50%	0	1,996	1.50%	0
Valid votes		132,748	100.00%	10	132,748	100.00%	10
Rejected votes		574	0.43%				
Total polled		133,322	82.27%				
Registered electors		162,052					

The following candidates were elected: Arvo Ahonen (SDP), 6,483 votes; Esko Härkönen (Kesk), 6,642 votes; Matti Jaatinen (Kok), 6,744 votes; Kalevi Kivistö (SKDL), 4,225 votes; Sakari Knuuttila (SDP), 7,787 votes; Siiri Lehmonen (SKDL), 4,068 votes; Aune Salama (SDP), 6,903 votes; Sylvi Saimo (Kesk), 4,947 votes; Olavi Tupamäki (SMP), 8,464 votes; and Veikko Turunen (SKL), 3,734 votes.

===== 1970 =====
Results of the 1970 parliamentary election held on 15 and 16 March 1970:

Party		Party			Electoral Alliance		
Party		Votes	%	Seats	Votes	%	Seats
Centre Party	Kesk	26,831	20.38%	3	33,932	25.77%	3
Liberal People's Party	LKP	7,101	5.39%	0	33,932	25.77%	3
Social Democratic Party of Finland	SDP	32,123	24.40%	3	32,123	24.40%	3
Finnish People's Democratic League	SKDL	23,479	17.83%	2	28,597	21.72%	2
Social Democratic Union of Workers and Smallholders	TPSL	5,118	3.89%	0	28,597	21.72%	2
National Coalition Party	Kok	17,240	13.09%	2	17,240	13.09%	2
Finnish Rural Party	SMP	16,582	12.59%	1	16,582	12.59%	1
Finnish Christian League	SKL	3,194	2.43%	0	3,194	2.43%	0
Valid votes		131,668	100.00%	11	131,668	100.00%	11
Rejected votes		573	0.43%				
Total polled		132,241	83.51%				
Registered electors		158,354					

The following candidates were elected: Arvo Ahonen (SDP), 4,884 votes; Esko Härkönen (Kesk), 3,895 votes; Matti Jaatinen (Kok), 6,870 votes; Artturi Jämsén (Kesk), 4,896 votes; Sakari Knuuttila (SDP), 6,961 votes; Matti Koivunen (SKDL), 4,807 votes; Siiri Lehmonen (SKDL), 4,852 votes; Aune Salama (SDP), 7,056 votes; Sylvi Saimo (Kesk), 4,380 votes; Pentti Sillantaus (Kok), 4,641 votes; and Olavi Tupamäki (SMP), 5,906 votes.

==== 1960s ====
===== 1966 =====
Results of the 1966 parliamentary election held on 20 and 21 March 1966:

Party		Party			Electoral Alliance		
Party		Votes	%	Seats	Votes	%	Seats
Social Democratic Party of Finland	SDP	35,137	28.55%	4	35,137	28.55%	4
Finnish People's Democratic League	SKDL	27,094	22.02%	2	34,694	28.19%	3
Social Democratic Union of Workers and Smallholders	TPSL	7,600	6.18%	1	34,694	28.19%	3
Centre Party	Kesk	32,746	26.61%	3	32,746	26.61%	3
National Coalition Party	Kok	12,800	10.40%	1	12,800	10.40%	1
Liberal People's Party	LKP	6,992	5.68%	0	7,658	6.22%	0
Smallholders' Party of Finland	SPP	666	0.54%	0	7,658	6.22%	0
Write-in lists		18	0.01%	0	18	0.01%	0
Valid votes		123,053	100.00%	11	123,053	100.00%	11
Blank votes		77	0.06%				
Rejected Votess – Other		546	0.44%				
Total polled		123,676	85.38%				
Registered electors		144,859					

The following candidates were elected: Arvo Ahonen (SDP), 8,094 votes; Artturi Jämsén (Kesk), 6,355 votes; Sakari Knuuttila (SDP), 5,320 votes; Matti Koivunen (SKDL), 5,905 votes; Artturi Koskinen (SDP), 5,081 votes; Siiri Lehmonen (SKDL), 6,166 votes; Impi Lukkarinen (TPSL), 7,600 votes; Mauno Pohjonen (Kesk), 4,752 votes; Aune Salama (SDP), 5,119 votes; Sylvi Saimo (Kesk), 3,956 votes; and Pentti Sillantaus (Kok), 3,746 votes.

===== 1962 =====
Results of the 1962 parliamentary election held on 4 and 5 February 1962:

Party		Party			Electoral Alliance		
Party		Votes	%	Seats	Votes	%	Seats
Agrarian Party	ML	31,996	26.39%	3	35,488	29.27%	3
Smallholders' Party Opposition		2,899	2.39%	0	35,488	29.27%	3
Centre Party		593	0.49%	0	35,488	29.27%	3
Finnish People's Democratic League	SKDL	27,664	22.82%	3	27,664	22.82%	3
Social Democratic Party of Finland	SDP	27,360	22.56%	2	27,360	22.56%	2
National Coalition Party	Kok	12,894	10.63%	1	18,691	15.42%	2
People's Party of Finland	SK	5,797	4.78%	1	18,691	15.42%	2
Social Democratic Union of Workers and Smallholders	TPSL	9,140	7.54%	1	9,140	7.54%	1
Smallholders' Party of Finland	SPP	2,903	2.39%	0	2,903	2.39%	0
Write-in lists		4	0.00%	0	4	0.00%	0
Valid votes		121,250	100.00%	11	121,250	100.00%	11
Rejected votes		666	0.55%				
Total polled		121,916	85.41%				
Registered electors		142,737					

The following candidates were elected: Arvo Ahonen (SDP), 5,754 votes; Veikko Hyytiäinen (SK), 5,797 votes; Artturi Jämsén (ML), 6,450 votes; Olavi Kämäräinen (SKDL), 5.126 votes; Matti Koivunen (SKDL), 6,755 votes; Artturi Koskinen (SDP), 4,187 votes; Siiri Lehmonen (SKDL), 5,616 votes; Vilho Leivonen (ML), 4,761 votes; Impi Lukkarinen (TPSL), 4,770 votes; Mauno Pohjonen (ML), 6,390 votes; and Pentti Sillantaus (Kok), 3,196 votes.

==== 1950s ====
===== 1958 =====
Results of the 1958 parliamentary election held on 6 and 7 July 1958:

Party		Party			Electoral Alliance		
Party		Votes	%	Seats	Votes	%	Seats
Agrarian Party	ML	38,136	34.48%	4	38,136	34.48%	4
Social Democratic Party of Finland	SDP	29,593	26.75%	3	29,593	26.75%	3
Finnish People's Democratic League	SKDL	24,675	22.31%	3	24,675	22.31%	3
National Coalition Party	Kok	14,101	12.75%	1	18,203	16.46%	2
People's Party of Finland	SK	3,442	3.11%	1	18,203	16.46%	2
Liberal League	VL	660	0.60%	0	18,203	16.46%	2
Write-in lists		6	0.01%	0	6	0.01%	0
Valid votes		110,613	100.00%	12	110,613	100.00%	12
Rejected votes		798	0.72%				
Total polled		111,411	75.76%				
Registered electors		147,064					

The following candidates were elected: Arvo Ahonen (SDP), 4,866 votes; Päiviö Hetemäki (Kok), 5,725 votes; Veikko Hyytiäinen (SK), 3,276 votes; Artturi Jämsén (ML), 4,460 votes; Aleksi Kiviaho (SKDL), 3,589 votes; Matti Koivunen (SKDL), 5,463 votes; Siiri Lehmonen (SKDL), 3,698 votes; Impi Lukkarinen (SDP), 4,629 votes; Eino Palovesi (ML), 3,929 votes; Onni Peltonen (SDP), 4,830 votes; Veikko Savela (ML), 3,717 votes; and Eino Uusitalo (ML), 6,519 votes.

===== 1954 =====
Results of the 1954 parliamentary election held on 7 and 8 March 1954:

Party		Party			Electoral Alliance		
Party		Votes	%	Seats	Votes	%	Seats
Agrarian Party	ML	39,528	34.18%	4	39,528	34.18%	4
Social Democratic Party of Finland	SDP	34,344	29.70%	4	34,344	29.70%	4
Finnish People's Democratic League	SKDL	23,700	20.49%	2	23,700	20.49%	2
National Coalition Party	Kok	14,038	12.14%	1	18,048	15.61%	2
People's Party of Finland	SK	4,010	3.47%	1	18,048	15.61%	2
Write-in lists		18	0.02%	0	18	0.02%	0
Valid votes		115,638	100.00%	12	115,638	100.00%	12
Rejected votes		732	0.63%				
Total polled		116,370	81.45%				
Registered electors		142,880					

The following candidates were elected: Arvo Ahonen (SDP); Päiviö Hetemäki (Kok); Artturi Jämsén (ML); Aleksi Kiviaho (SKDL); Matti Koivunen (SKDL); Artturi Koskinen (SDP); Aare Leikola (SK); Impi Lukkarinen (SDP); Eino Palovesi (ML); Onni Peltonen (SDP); Väinö Rankila (ML); and Eero Saari (ML).

===== 1951 =====
Results of the 1951 parliamentary election held on 1 and 2 July 1951:

Party		Party			Electoral Alliance		
Party		Votes	%	Seats	Votes	%	Seats
Agrarian Party	ML	33,223	32.15%	5	35,558	34.41%	5
People's Party of Finland	SK	2,335	2.26%	0	35,558	34.41%	5
Social Democratic Party of Finland	SDP	31,418	30.41%	4	31,418	30.41%	4
Finnish People's Democratic League	SKDL	20,993	20.32%	2	20,993	20.32%	2
National Coalition Party	Kok	13,590	13.15%	1	14,114	13.66%	1
Liberal League	VL	524	0.51%	0	14,114	13.66%	1
Radical People's Party		783	0.76%	0	783	0.76%	0
Small Farmers Party		456	0.44%	0	456	0.44%	0
Write-in lists		6	0.01%	0	6	0.01%	0
Valid votes		103,328	100.00%	12	103,328	100.00%	12
Rejected votes		920	0.88%				
Total polled		104,248	73.47%				
Registered electors		141,888					

The following candidates were elected: Arvo Ahonen (SDP); Päiviö Hetemäki (Kok); Matti Koivunen (SKDL); Artturi Koskinen (SDP); Vilho Leivonen (ML); Impi Lukkarinen (SDP); Eino Palovesi (ML); Onni Peltonen (SDP); Ville Puumalainen (SKDL); Väinö Rankila (ML); Eero Saari (ML); and Taavi Vilhula (ML).

==== 1940s ====
===== 1948 =====
Results of the 1948 parliamentary election held on 1 and 2 July 1948:

Party		Party			Electoral Alliance		
Party		Votes	%	Seats	Votes	%	Seats
Agrarian Party	ML	33,047	33.73%	4	33,047	33.73%	4
Social Democratic Party of Finland	SDP	29,837	30.46%	3	29,837	30.46%	3
Finnish People's Democratic League	SKDL	18,951	19.34%	2	18,951	19.34%	2
National Coalition Party	Kok	13,635	13.92%	2	15,569	15.89%	2
National Progressive Party	KE	1,934	1.97%	0	15,569	15.89%	2
Others		563	0.57%	0	563	0.57%	0
Valid votes		97,967	100.00%	11	97,967	100.00%	11
Rejected votes		679	0.69%				
Total polled		98,646	77.90%				
Registered electors		126,634					

The following candidates were elected: Heikki Ala-Mäyry (Kok); Päiviö Hetemäki (Kok); Hilma Koivulahti-Lehto (SDP); Artturi Koskinen (SDP); Eino Palovesi (ML); Mauno Pekkala (SKDL); Onni Peltonen (SDP); Ville Puumalainen (SKDL); Väinö Rankila (ML); Vihtori Vesterinen (ML); and Taavi Vilhula (ML).

===== 1945 =====
Results of the 1945 parliamentary election held on 17 and 18 March 1945:

Party		Party			Electoral Alliance		
Party		Votes	%	Seats	Votes	%	Seats
Agrarian Party	ML	24,583	29.13%	3	24,583	29.13%	3
Finnish People's Democratic League	SKDL	23,413	27.74%	3	23,888	28.30%	3
Small Farmers Party		475	0.56%	0	23,888	28.30%	3
Social Democratic Party of Finland	SDP	22,547	26.71%	3	22,547	26.71%	3
National Coalition Party	Kok	10,951	12.97%	1	13,014	15.42%	2
National Progressive Party	KE	2,063	2.44%	1	13,014	15.42%	2
Write-in lists		373	0.44%	0	373	0.44%	0
Valid votes		84,405	100.00%	11	84,405	100.00%	11
Rejected votes		450	0.53%				
Total polled		84,855	74.49%				
Registered electors		113,918					

The following candidates were elected: Tuomas Bryggari (SDP); Päiviö Hetemäki (Kok); Vilho Lehtonen (SKDL); Eino Möttönen (ML); Mauno Pekkala (SKDL); Onni Peltonen (SDP); Ville Puumalainen (SKDL); Uuno Raatikainen (SDP); Bruno Sarlin (KE); Vihtori Vesterinen (ML); and Taavi Vilhula (ML).

==== 1930s ====
===== 1939 =====
Results of the 1939 parliamentary election held on 1 and 2 July 1939:

Party		Party			Electoral Alliance		
Party		Votes	%	Seats	Votes	%	Seats
Social Democratic Party of Finland	SDP	29,135	45.54%	5	29,135	45.54%	5
Agrarian Party	ML	19,543	30.55%	4	21,623	33.80%	4
National Progressive Party	KE	2,080	3.25%	0	21,623	33.80%	4
National Coalition Party	Kok	7,233	11.31%	1	7,233	11.31%	1
Patriotic People's Movement	IKL	4,863	7.60%	0	4,863	7.60%	0
Party of Smallholders and Rural People	PMP	1,057	1.65%	0	1,057	1.65%	0
Write-in lists		59	0.09%	0	59	0.09%	0
Valid votes		63,970	100.00%	10	63,970	100.00%	10
Rejected votes		251	0.39%				
Total polled		64,221	68.30%				
Registered electors		94,034					

The following candidates were elected: Tuomas Bryggari (SDP); Väinö Havas (Kok); Hilma Koivulahti-Lehto (SDP); Matti Luoma-aho (ML); Eino Möttönen (ML); Mauno Pekkala (SDP); Onni Peltonen (SDP); Uuno Raatikainen (SDP); Vihtori Vesterinen (ML); and Taavi Vilhula (ML).

===== 1936 =====
Results of the 1936 parliamentary election held on 1 and 2 July 1936:

Party		Votes	%	Seats
Social Democratic Party of Finland	SDP	27,459	45.50%	6
Agrarian Party	ML	17,954	29.75%	3
Patriotic People's Movement	IKL	6,636	11.00%	1
National Progressive Party	KE	3,966	6.57%	0
National Coalition Party	Kok	3,761	6.23%	0
Small Farmers' Party of Finland	SPP	508	0.84%	0
Write-in lists		65	0.11%	0
Valid votes		60,349	100.00%	10
Rejected votes		228	0.38%	
Total polled		60,577	66.36%	
Registered electors		91,288		

The following candidates were elected: Reino Ala-Kulju (IKL); Tuomas Bryggari (SDP); Hilma Koivulahti-Lehto (SDP); Artturi Leinonen (ML); Atte Muhonen (SDP); Mauno Pekkala (SDP); Onni Peltonen (SDP); Uuno Raatikainen (SDP); Vihtori Vesterinen (ML); and Taavi Vilhula (ML).

===== 1933 =====
Results of the 1933 parliamentary election held on 1, 2 and 3 July 1933:

Party		Party			Electoral Alliance		
Party		Votes	%	Seats	Votes	%	Seats
Social Democratic Labour Party of Finland	SDTP	26,587	45.72%	5	26,587	45.72%	5
Agrarian Party	ML	15,791	27.15%	3	18,971	32.62%	4
National Progressive Party	KE	3,180	5.47%	1	18,971	32.62%	4
National Coalition Party and Patriotic People's Movement	Kok-IKL	8,602	14.79%	1	8,602	14.79%	1
Small Farmers' Party of Finland	SPP	3,767	6.48%	0	3,767	6.48%	0
National Economy		101	0.17%	0	101	0.17%	0
National Socialist Union of Finland	SKSL	84	0.14%	0	84	0.14%	0
Write-in lists		41	0.07%	0	41	0.07%	0
Valid votes		58,153	100.00%	10	58,153	100.00%	10
Rejected votes		209	0.36%				
Total polled		58,362	66.90%				
Registered electors		87,233					

The following candidates were elected: Reino Ala-Kulju (Kok-IKL); Jussi Annala (ML); Tuomas Bryggari (SDTP); Hilma Koivulahti-Lehto (SDTP); Mauno Pekkala (SDTP); Onni Peltonen (SDTP); Bruno Sarlin (KE); Edvard Setälä (SDTP); Vihtori Vesterinen (ML); and Taavi Vilhula (ML).

===== 1930 =====
Results of the 1930 parliamentary election held on 1 and 2 October 1930:

Party		Party			Electoral Alliance		
Party		Votes	%	Seats	Votes	%	Seats
Social Democratic Labour Party of Finland	SDTP	24,638	43.54%	5	24,638	43.54%	5
Agrarian Party	ML	17,117	30.25%	3	17,117	30.25%	3
National Coalition Party	Kok	7,802	13.79%	1	12,571	22.22%	2
National Progressive Party	KE	4,002	7.07%	1	12,571	22.22%	2
Small groups of the Patriotic List		767	1.36%	0	12,571	22.22%	2
Small Farmers' Party of Finland	SPP	2,184	3.86%	0	2,184	3.86%	0
Write-in lists		76	0.13%	0	76	0.13%	0
Valid votes		56,586	100.00%	10	56,586	100.00%	10
Rejected votes		222	0.39%				
Total polled		56,808	67.39%				
Registered electors		84,296					

The following candidates were elected: Jussi Annala (ML); Tuomas Bryggari (SDTP); Aleksi Hakala (ML); Hilma Koivulahti-Lehto (SDTP); Jalmari Kovanen (SDTP); Mauno Pekkala (SDTP); Martti Pihkala (Kok); Bruno Sarlin (KE); Edvard Setälä (SDTP); and Vihtori Vesterinen (ML).

==== 1920s ====
===== 1929 =====
Results of the 1929 parliamentary election held on 1 and 2 July 1929:

Party		Votes	%	Seats
Social Democratic Labour Party of Finland	SDTP	20,812	43.28%	6
Agrarian Party	ML	13,489	28.05%	3
National Coalition Party	Kok	5,428	11.29%	1
Socialist Electoral Organisation of Workers and Smallholders	STPV	3,453	7.18%	0
National Progressive Party	KE	2,498	5.20%	0
Small Farmers' Party of Finland	SPP	2,139	4.45%	0
Others		263	0.55%	0
Valid votes		48,082	100.00%	10
Rejected votes		219	0.45%	
Total polled		48,301	57.33%	
Registered electors		84,249		

The following candidates were elected: Tuomas Bryggari (SDTP); Aleksi Hakala (ML); Hilma Koivulahti-Lehto (SDTP); Artur Koskelin (SDTP); Jalmari Kovanen (SDTP); Aukusti Luoma (Kok); Mauno Pekkala (SDTP); Edvard Setälä (SDTP); Vihtori Vesterinen (ML); and Taavi Vilhula (ML).

===== 1927 =====
Results of the 1927 parliamentary election held on 1 and 2 July 1927:

Party		Votes	%	Seats
Social Democratic Labour Party of Finland	SDTP	22,543	48.35%	6
Agrarian Party	ML	12,135	26.03%	3
National Coalition Party	Kok	5,895	12.64%	1
National Progressive Party	KE	3,175	6.81%	0
Socialist Electoral Organisation of Workers and Smallholders	STPV	2,812	6.03%	0
Write-in lists		62	0.13%	0
Valid votes		46,622	100.00%	10
Rejected votes		194	0.41%	
Total polled		46,816	58.59%	
Registered electors		79,911		

The following candidates were elected: Tuomas Bryggari (SDTP); Aleksi Hakala (ML); Kaarlo Hurme (ML); Hilma Koivulahti-Lehto (SDTP); Toivo Lehto (SDTP); Aukusti Luoma (Kok); Atte Muhonen (SDTP); Mauno Pekkala (SDTP); Edvard Setälä (SDTP); and Vihtori Vesterinen (ML).

===== 1924 =====
Results of the 1924 parliamentary election held on 1 and 2 April 1924:

Party		Votes	%	Seats
Social Democratic Labour Party of Finland	SDTP	21,967	49.98%	6
Agrarian Party	ML	10,107	23.00%	2
National Coalition Party	Kok	5,794	13.18%	1
National Progressive Party	KE	4,258	9.69%	1
Socialist Electoral Organisation of Workers and Smallholders	STPV	1,746	3.97%	0
Write-in lists		81	0.18%	0
Valid votes		43,953	100.00%	10
Rejected votes		130	0.29%	
Total polled		44,083	58.18%	
Registered electors		75,770		

The following candidates were elected: Tuomas Bryggari (SDTP); Oskari Heikinheimo (Kok); Kaarlo Hurme (ML); Aaro Jaskari (KE); Hilma Koivulahti-Lehto (SDTP); Jalmari Kovanen (SDTP); Toivo Lehto (SDTP); Atte Muhonen (SDTP); Edvard Setälä (SDTP); and Vihtori Vesterinen (ML).

===== 1922 =====
Results of the 1922 parliamentary election held on 1, 2 and 3 July 1922:

Party		Votes	%	Seats
Social Democratic Labour Party of Finland	SDTP	18,603	43.70%	5
Agrarian Party	ML	11,033	25.92%	2
National Coalition Party	Kok	5,210	12.24%	1
National Progressive Party	KE	3,930	9.23%	1
Socialist Workers' Party of Finland	SSTP	3,720	8.74%	1
Write-in lists		71	0.17%	0
Valid votes		42,567	100.00%	10
Rejected votes		227	0.53%	
Total polled		42,794	58.35%	
Registered electors		73,341		

The following candidates were elected: Tuomas Bryggari (SDTP); Oskari Heikinheimo (Kok); Aaro Jaskari (KE); Hilma Koivulahti-Lehto (SDTP); Toivo Lehto (SDTP); Atte Muhonen (SDTP); Lauri Perälä (ML); Emil Raearo (SDTP); Lempi Tuomi (SSTP); and Vihtori Vesterinen (ML).

==== 1910s ====
===== 1919 =====
Results of the 1919 parliamentary election held on 1, 2 and 3 March 1919:

Party		Party			Electoral Alliance		
Party		Votes	%	Seats	Votes	%	Seats
Social Democratic Labour Party of Finland	SDTP	24,078	49.36%	6	24,078	49.36%	6
Agrarian Party	ML	14,973	30.69%	3	15,398	31.57%	3
Christian Workers' Union of Finland	KrTL	425	0.87%	0	15,398	31.57%	3
National Coalition Party	Kok	5,736	11.76%	1	5,736	11.76%	1
National Progressive Party	KE	3,507	7.19%	0	3,507	7.19%	0
Write-in lists		61	0.13%	0	61	0.13%	0
Valid votes		48,780	100.00%	10	48,780	100.00%	10
Rejected votes		127	0.26%				
Total polled		48,907	69.82%				
Registered electors		70,044					

The following candidates were elected: Aleksanteri Koivisto (Kok); Hilma Koivulahti-Lehto (SDTP); Artur Koskelin (SDTP); August Koskinen (SDTP); Matti Latvala (ML); Jalmari Linna (SDTP); Penna Paunu (SDTP); Lauri Perälä (ML); Emil Raearo (SDTP); and Vihtori Vesterinen (ML).

===== 1917 =====
Results of the 1917 parliamentary election held on 1 and 2 October 1917:

Party		Votes	%	Seats
Social Democratic Party of Finland	SDP	26,106	53.49%	6
United Finnish Parties (Finnish Party, Young Finnish Party and People's Party)	SP-NP-KP	12,879	26.39%	2
Agrarian Party	ML	9,638	19.75%	2
Others		186	0.38%	0
Valid votes		48,809	100.00%	10
Rejected votes		233	0.48%	
Total polled		49,042	67.21%	
Registered electors		72,965		

The following candidates were elected: Samuli Häkkinen (SDP); Aleksanteri Koivisto (SP-NP-KP); Mikko Luopajärvi (ML); Santeri Mäkelä (SDP); Kaarle Mänty (SDP); Emanuel Pohjaväre (SDP); Antti Rentola (ML); Oskari Suutala (SDP); Onni Tuomi (SDP); and Eemil Vekara (SP-NP-KP).

===== 1916 =====
Results of the 1916 parliamentary election held on 1 and 3 July 1916:

Party		Votes	%	Seats
Social Democratic Party of Finland	SDP	23,032	58.84%	7
Finnish Party	SP	7,477	19.10%	2
Agrarian Party	ML	4,810	12.29%	1
Young Finnish Party	NP	3,748	9.58%	1
Write-in lists		74	0.19%	0
Valid votes		39,141	100.00%	11
Rejected votes		489	1.23%	
Total polled		39,630	53.35%	
Registered electors		74,286		

The following candidates were elected: Samuli Häkkinen (SDP); Aleksanteri Koivisto (SP); William Koskelin (NP); Maria Letonmäki (SDP); Akseli Listo (SP); Mikko Luopajärvi (ML); Kaarle Mänty (SDP); Emanuel Pohjaväre (SDP); Samuli Rantanen (SDP); Aino Takala (SDP); and Onni Tuomi (SDP).

===== 1913 =====
Results of the 1913 parliamentary election held on 1 and 2 August 1913:

Party		Votes	%	Seats
Social Democratic Party of Finland	SDP	19,426	54.16%	6
Finnish Party	SP	8,794	24.52%	3
Agrarian Party	ML	4,059	11.32%	1
Young Finnish Party	NP	3,503	9.77%	1
Write-in lists		83	0.23%	0
Valid votes		35,865	100.00%	11
Rejected votes		461	1.27%	
Total polled		36,326	47.86%	
Registered electors		75,894		

The following candidates were elected: Samuli Häkkinen (SDP); Kyösti Kanniainen (NP); Jussi Kautto (SDP); Aleksanteri Koivisto (SP); Matti Latvala (ML); Lauri Letonmäki (SDP); Akseli Listo (SP); Kaarle Mänty (SDP); Emanuel Pohjaväre (SDP); Onni Tuomi (SDP); and Kaarlo Warvikko (SP).

===== 1911 =====
Results of the 1911 parliamentary election held on 2 and 3 January 1911:

Party		Votes	%	Seats
Social Democratic Party of Finland	SDP	20,947	50.66%	6
Finnish Party	SP	10,338	25.00%	3
Young Finnish Party	NP	5,182	12.53%	1
Agrarian Party	ML	4,149	10.03%	1
Christian Workers' Union of Finland	KrTL	670	1.62%	0
Write-in lists		62	0.15%	0
Valid votes		41,348	100.00%	11
Rejected votes		184	0.44%	
Total polled		41,532	58.00%	
Registered electors		71,608		

The following candidates were elected: Juho Etelämäki (SDP); Kustaa Jalkanen (NP); Jussi Kautto (SDP); Aleksanteri Koivisto (SP); Matti Latvala (ML); Akseli Listo (SP); Santeri Mäkelä (SDP); Kaarle Mänty (SDP); Emanuel Pohjaväre (SDP); Onni Tuomi (SDP); and Kaarlo Warvikko (SP).

===== 1910 =====
Results of the 1910 parliamentary election held on 1 and 2 February 1910:

Party		Votes	%	Seats
Social Democratic Party of Finland	SDP	19,843	50.99%	6
Finnish Party	SP	9,307	23.92%	3
Young Finnish Party	NP	5,341	13.73%	1
Agrarian Party	ML	3,694	9.49%	1
Christian Workers' Union of Finland	KrTL	658	1.69%	0
Write-in lists		70	0.18%	0
Valid votes		38,913	100.00%	11
Rejected votes		139	0.36%	
Total polled		39,052	56.30%	
Registered electors		69,366		

The following candidates were elected: Juho Etelämäki (SDP); Kustaa Jalkanen (NP); Jussi Kautto (SDP); Aleksanteri Koivisto (SP); Matti Latvala (ML); Akseli Listo (SP); Santeri Mäkelä (SDP); Kaarle Mänty (SDP); Emanuel Pohjaväre (SDP); Onni Tuomi (SDP); and Kaarlo Warvikko (SP).

==== 1900s ====
===== 1909 =====
Results of the 1909 parliamentary election held on 1 and 3 May 1909:

Party		Votes	%	Seats
Social Democratic Party of Finland	SDP	22,925	51.74%	6
Finnish Party	SP	10,877	24.55%	3
Young Finnish Party	NP	5,854	13.21%	1
Agrarian Party	ML	3,667	8.28%	1
Christian Workers' Union of Finland	KrTL	901	2.03%	0
Others		87	0.20%	0
Valid votes		44,311	100.00%	11
Rejected votes		212	0.48%	
Total polled		44,523	65.65%	
Registered electors		67,821		

The following candidates were elected: Eveliina Ala-Kulju (SP); Juho Etelämäki (SDP); Juho Haveri (NP); Oskar Kaipio (SDP); Jalmari Kirjarinta (SDP); Aleksanteri Koivisto (SP); Matti Latvala (ML); Akseli Listo (SP); Samuli Rantanen (SDP); Maria Raunio (SDP); and Onni Tuomi (SDP).

===== 1908 =====
Results of the 1908 parliamentary election held on 1 and 2 July 1908:

Party		Votes	%	Seats
Social Democratic Party of Finland	SDP	19,286	47.21%	6
Finnish Party	SP	11,495	28.14%	3
Young Finnish Party	NP	6,233	15.26%	2
Agrarian Party	ML	2,830	6.93%	0
Christian Workers' Union of Finland	KrTL	971	2.38%	0
Others		36	0.09%	0
Valid votes		40,851	100.00%	11
Rejected votes		509	1.23%	
Total polled		41,360	62.67%	
Registered electors		65,997		

The following candidates were elected: Eveliina Ala-Kulju (SP); Oskar Kaipio (SDP); Jalmari Kirjarinta (SDP); Aleksanteri Koivisto (SP); William Koskelin (NP); Akseli Listo (SP); Emanuel Pohjaväre (SDP); Samuli Rantanen (SDP); Maria Raunio (SDP); Otto Stenroth (NP); and Onni Tuomi (SDP).

===== 1907 =====
Results of the 1907 parliamentary election held on 15 and 16 March 1907:

Party		Votes	%	Seats
Social Democratic Party of Finland	SDP	22,029	48.15%	6
Finnish Party	SP	14,238	31.12%	3
Young Finnish Party	NP	8,123	17.75%	2
Agrarian Party	ML	867	1.89%	0
Others		495	1.08%	0
Valid votes		45,752	100.00%	11
Rejected votes		280	0.61%	
Total polled		46,032	68.55%	
Registered electors		67,150		

The following candidates were elected: Eveliina Ala-Kulju (SP); Juho Haveri (NP); Samuli Häkkinen (SDP); Aleksanteri Koivisto (SP); William Koskelin (NP); Akseli Listo (SP); Kaarle Mänty (SDP); Joel Naaralainen (SDP); Emanuel Pohjaväre (SDP); Samuli Rantanen (SDP); and Maria Raunio (SDP).
