= Impi (disambiguation) =

An impi is a Zulu regiment.

Impi may also refer to:

- IP Multimedia Private Identity
- Internal Microprogrammed Interface, an instruction set architecture of the IBM System/38 and early IBM AS/400 systems.
- International Microwave Power Institute
- Mexican Institute of Industrial Property (Spanish: Instituto Mexicano de la Propiedad Industrial)
- Impi Lukkarinen (1918–2010), Finnish journalist and politician
- Impi Visser (born 1995), South African rugby sevens player
- Impi, a song by the South African band Juluka
