= Pohjanen =

Pohjanen is a Finnish surname. Notable people with the surname include:

- Bengt Pohjanen (born 1944), Swedish author, translator, and priest
- Anna Pohjanen (born 1974), Swedish footballer

== See also ==
- Pohjonen
