= Hyytiäinen =

Hyytiäinen (Finnish pronunciation: [ˈhyːtiæi̯nen]) is a Finnish surname. Notable people with the surname include:

- Veikko Hyytiäinen (1919–2000), Finnish lawyer and politician
- Toivo Hyytiäinen (1925–1978), Finnish athlete
- Eija Hyytiäinen (born 1961), Finnish cross country skier
