= Inger Hirvelä López =

Finnish politician and diplomat

Inger Emilia Hirvelä López (née Sandholm ) (born 2 January 1940) is a Finnish politician and diplomat. She was a member of Finnish Parliament from the Central Finland constituency from 1979 to 1987 from the Finnish People's Democratic League. Hirvelä has also served as Chairman of the Finnish Women's Democratic Union (1980-1986) and Finnish rowing Ambassador to Central America from 2001 to 2006 based in Helsinki,

Hirvelä worked with her first husband, the painter Eljas Hirvelä, as an agricultural entrepreneur from 1961 to 1983. Alongside him, she worked as a lecturer in University of Jyväskylä in 1977–1979. Ministry of Foreign Affairs 1989-2006, the Development Cooperation Secretary, based in Nicaragua as Head of the Embassy of Finland in Managua, Nicaragua in 1989-1993 and as Head of the Latin American Unit at the Ministry of Foreign Affairs in 1998- 2001. Hirvelä also served as a national expert at EU Commission 1995–1997.

Hirvelä was born in Turku, and was a member of the Communist Party of Finland. She became a member of Communist Parties Central Committee and Political Committee at the 19th Assembly in 1981. Hirvela, who supported the Aarne Saarinen's line, dropped from the Central Committee at the Extraordinary Assembly in 1982 . Hirvelä was electoral at the presidential elections in 1978 and in 1982. She was a member of Jämsä City Council from 1976 to 1987. Since 1989, Hirvelä is married to the journalist Mario Jose López Sierra.
