= Aila Paloniemi =

Finnish politician

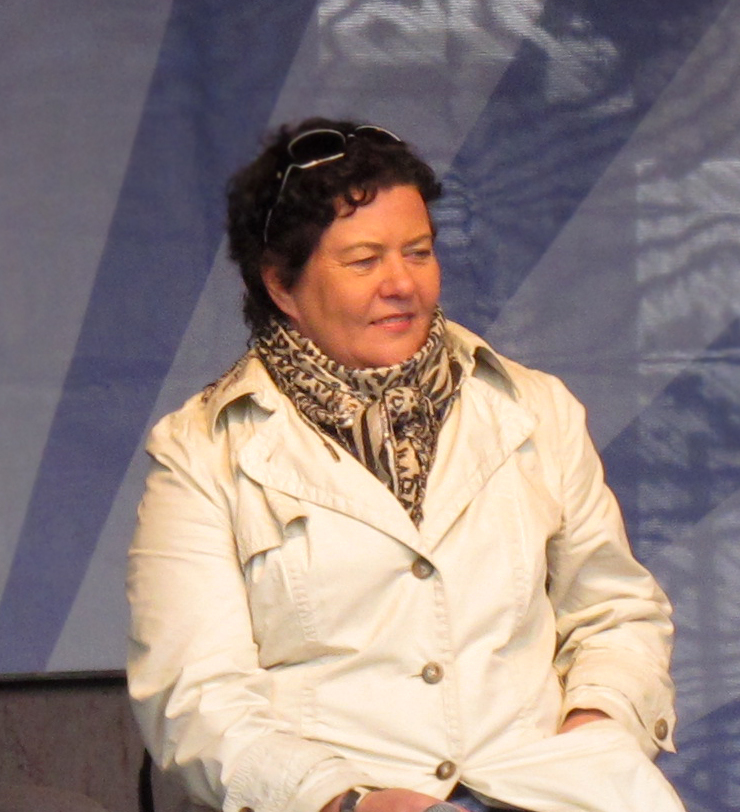

Member of the Finnish Parliament
- Incumbent
- Assumed office 19 March 2003

Personal details
- Born: 28 January 1956 (age 70) Kyyjärvi, Finland
- Party: Centre Party

Aila Annikki Paloniemi (born 28 January 1956 in Kyyjärvi, Finland) is a Finnish politician, representing the Centre Party in the Parliament of Finland since 2003. She was first elected to the Parliament from the Central Finland constituency in the 2003 elections with 4,887 votes.
