= Bella Forsgrén =

Finnish politician

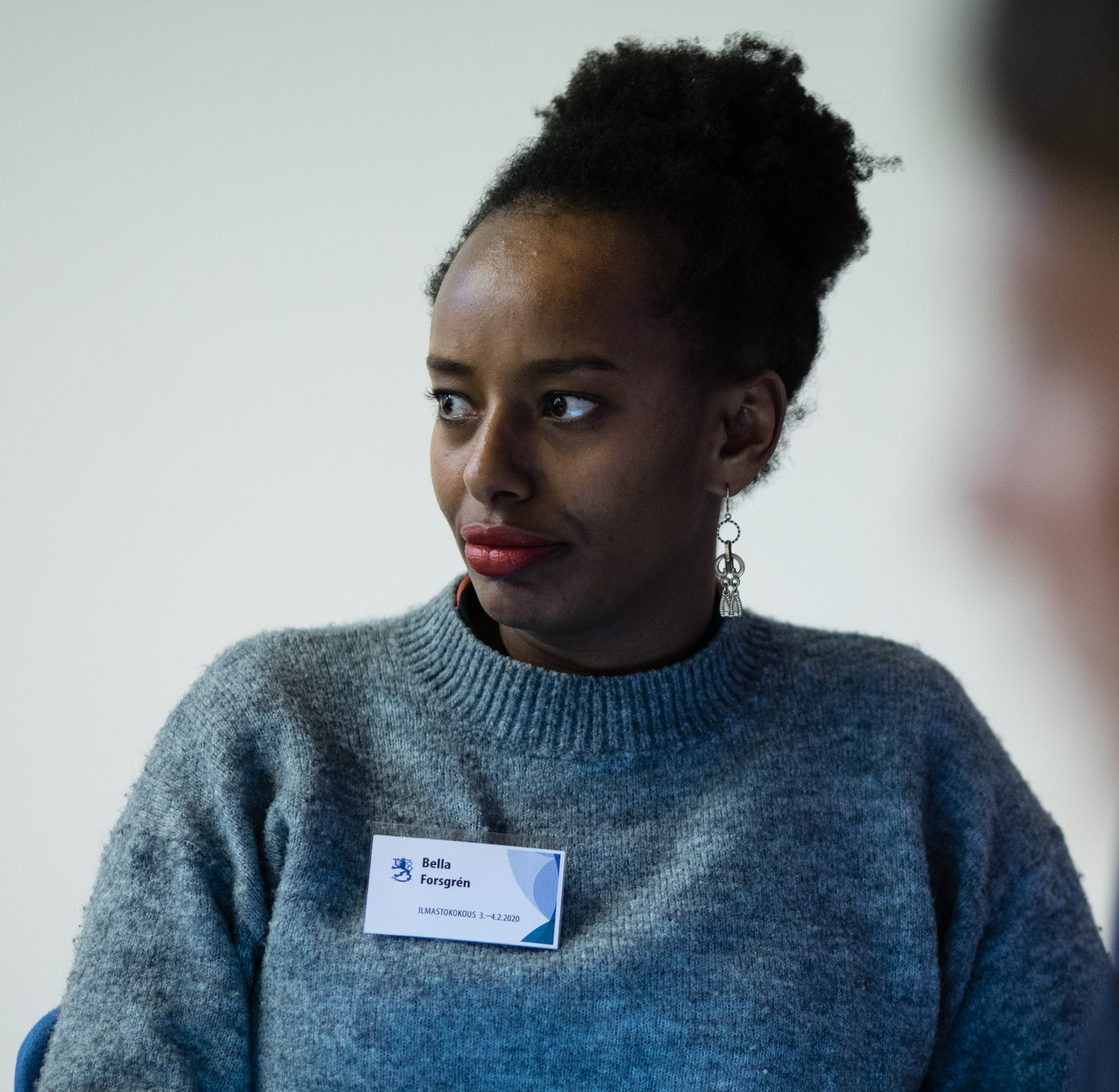
- Forsgrén in 2020

Member of the Finnish Parliament for Central Finland
- Incumbent
- Assumed office 17 April 2019

Personal details
- Born: 10 February 1992 (age 34) Addis Ababa, Ethiopia
- Party: Green League
- Education: University of Jyväskylä

Bella Asha Maria Belaynesh Forsgrén (born 10 February 1992 in Addis Ababa) is a Finnish politician of the Green League who has been serving as a member of the Parliament of Finland since 2019, representing the Central Finland constituency. She is the country's first Black female member of parliament.

== Early life ==
Forsgrén was adopted from Ethiopia to Finland when she was three years old.
