= Kaisa Garedew =

Finnish politician

Member of the Finnish Parliament for Central Finland
- Incumbent
- Assumed office 5 April 2023

Personal details
- Born: 19 February 1978 (age 48) Rauma, Finland
- Party: Finns Party

Kaisa Garedew (born 19 February 1978) is a Finnish politician currently serving in the Parliament of Finland for the Finns Party in the Central Finland constituency.

== Controversy ==
In December 2025, Garedew was among Finns Party politicians criticised for posting a social media image mimicking a gesture of pulling the corners of her eyes, widely regarded as a racist mockery of East Asian people. The post was made in support of Sarah Dzafce, the former Miss Finland who was stripped of her title after a similar gesture in a viral photo. Garedew described Dzafce's dethroning as an "excessive response" but did not apologise for her own action. She later told local media that she had nothing to apologise for. Finnish Prime Minister Petteri Orpo apologised to citizens of Japan, China, and South Korea for the incident, stating that racism has no place in Finnish society.

== Personal life ==
Garedew has five children with her Ethiopian husband.

== See also ==
- List of members of the Parliament of Finland, 2023–2027
