= Juho Kautto =

Finnish politician (born 1971)

Member of the Finnish Parliament for Central Finland
- In office 19 April 2019 – 4 April 2023

Personal details
- Born: 23 July 1971 (age 54) Äänekoski, Central Finland, Finland
- Party: Left Alliance

Juho Kautto (born 23 July 1971 in Äänekoski) is a Finnish politician who served in the Parliament of Finland for the Left Alliance at the Central Finland constituency. He was first elected to office in 2019.

Kautto was also the speaker of the Äänekoski city council until April 2021, when he stepped down from this position after having been caught chairing a city council meeting whilst drunk the previous month.
