= Artturi Jämsén =

Finnish politician (1925–1976)

Minister of Interior
- In office 15 July 1970 – 29 October 1971
- Prime Minister: Ahti Karjalainen

Governor of Central Finland
- In office 1971–1976

Personal details
- Born: 7 February 1925 Pihtipudas
- Died: 11 August 1976 (aged 51) Moscow, USSR
- Party: Agrarian League

Artturi Jämsén (1925–1976) was a Finnish politician. He was a long-term member of the Finnish Parliament and the minister of interior between 1970 and 1971. He also served as the governor of Central Finland region.

== Biography ==
Jämsén was born in Pihtipudas 7 February 1925. He was a high school graduate and a sergeant by military rank. He joined the Agrarian League. He was elected as a deputy on 29 March 1954, and his membership at the Parliament continued until 31 May 1971. During his term at the Parliament he represented first Vaasa County and then Central Finland. He was appointed interior minister on 15 July 1970 and remained in the post until 27 May 1971. He was part of the second cabinet of Prime Minister Ahti Karjalainen.

Then Jämsén was named the governor of Central Finland and served in the post between 1971 and 1976. He died in Moscow on 11 August 1976 during an official visit as governor.
