= Pirkko Ikonen =

Finnish politician (1927–2026)

Member of the Parliament of Finland for Central Finland
- In office 26 March 1983 – 21 March 1991

Personal details
- Born: 11 May 1927 Hollola, Finland
- Died: 9 January 2026 (aged 98)
- Party: Kesk
- Occupation: Teacher

Pirkko Ikonen (11 May 1927 – 9 January 2026) was a Finnish politician. A member of the Centre Party, she served in the Parliament from 1983 to 1991.

Ikonen died on 9 January 2026, at the age of 98.
