= Joonas Könttä =

Finnish politician (born 1989)

Joonas Kasperi Könttä

Member of the Finnish Parliament for Central Finland
- Incumbent
- Assumed office 17 April 2019

Personal details
- Born: 13 December 1989 (age 36) Lieksa, North Karelia, Finland
- Party: Centre Party
- Education: University of Jyväskylä

Joonas Kasperi Könttä (born 13 December 1989 in Lieksa) is a Finnish politician currently serving since 2019 in the Parliament of Finland for the Centre Party at the Central Finland constituency. He received his Masters of social sciences from the University of Jyväskylä in 2014. Prior to becoming a member of parliament, he worked for the Ministry for Foreign Affairs, the Ministry of Education and Culture, and the European Parliament.
