= Tomi Immonen =

Finnish politician (born 1966)

Member of the Finnish Parliament for Central Finland
- Incumbent
- Assumed office 5 April 2023

Personal details
- Born: 31 March 1966 (age 60) Finland
- Party: Finns Party

Tomi Immonen (born 31 March 1966) is a Finnish politician from the Finns Party. He was elected to the Parliament of Finland from the Central Finland constituency in the 2023 Finnish parliamentary election. He is a retired lieutenant colonel and an entrepreneur.

== See also ==
- List of members of the Parliament of Finland, 2023–2027
