= Jouni Kotiaho =

Finnish politician

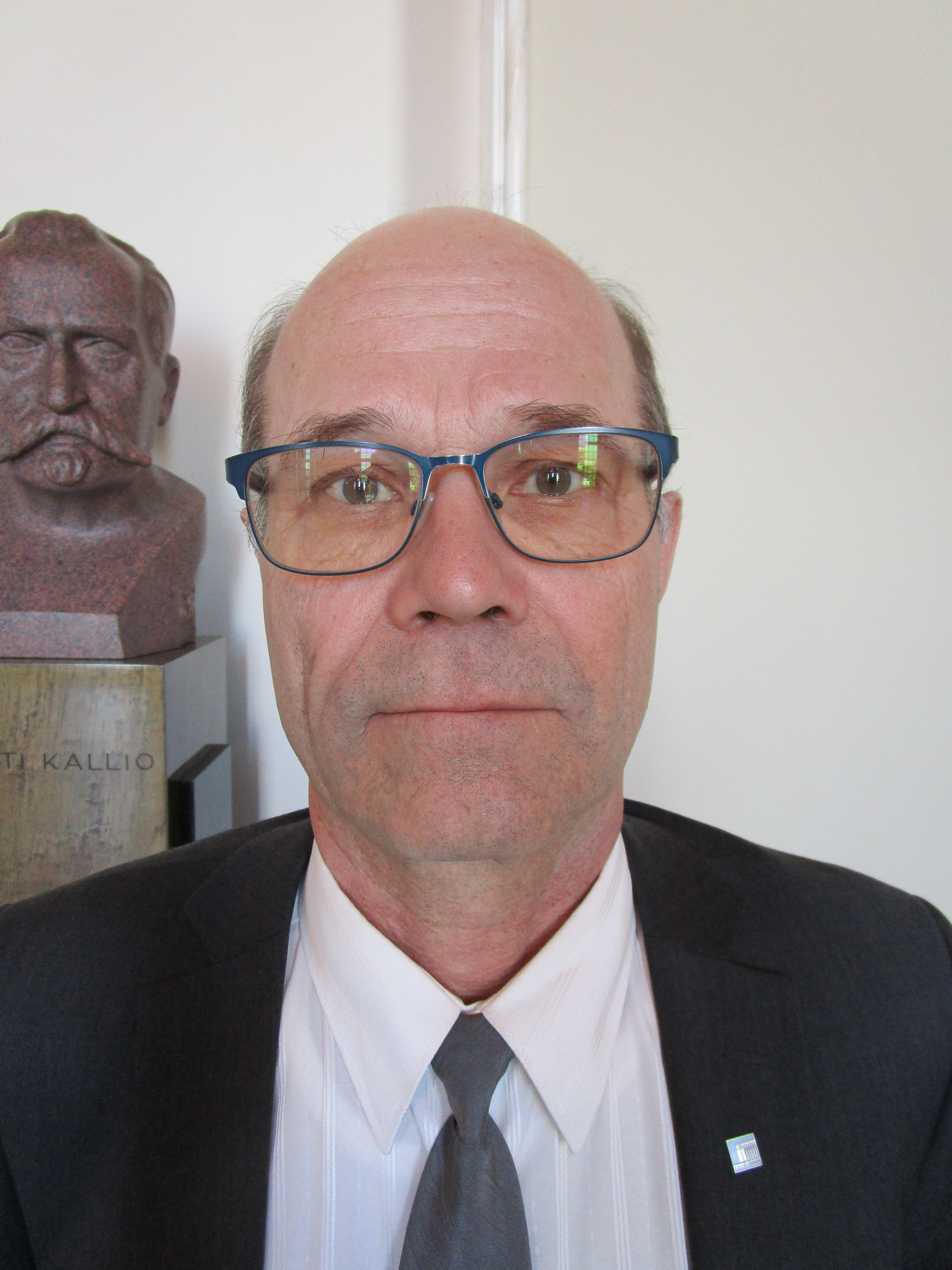
- Jouni Kotiaho in Parliament on March 12, 2020

Member of the Finnish Parliament for Central Finland
- Incumbent
- Assumed office 17 April 2019

Personal details
- Born: 23 February 1958 (age 68)
- Party: Finns Party

Jouni Juhani Kotiaho (born 23 February 1958) is a Finnish politician, previously served in the Parliament of Finland for the Finns Party at the Central Finland constituency. Kotiaho is an entrepreneur in the transport sector.
