= Pohjonen =

Pohjonen is a Finnish surname. Notable people with the surname include:

- Aarne Pohjonen (1886–1938), Finnish gymnast
- Mauno Pohjonen (1907–1987), Finnish agronomist and politician
- Kimmo Pohjonen (born 1964), Finnish accordionist
