= Jani Kokko =

Finnish politician

Member of the Parliament of Finland
- Incumbent
- Assumed office 2023

Personal details
- Born: 1987
- Occupation: Politician

Jani Kokko (born 1987) is a Finnish social-democratic politician. He was elected as a Member of Parliament in the 2023 Parliamentary elections with 4,890 votes from the constituency of Central Finland.

== Biography ==
Previously, he was a PhD researcher at the Department of History and Ethnology at the University of Jyväskylä. He has been a councillor in Muurame Municipality since 2009 and is the 1st vice-chairman of the Muurame Municipal council. He is also the Chairman of the Regional Council of Central Finland. Kokko lives in Muurame.

Kokko's master's thesis The voice of the nation: The Inaugural Addresses of US Presidents as a Genre of Political Speech from George Washington to Barack Obama was accepted by the Department of History and Ethnology at the University of Jyväskylä in August 2012. He worked on the 2020 US presidential election and on the NATO membership process as a Yle expert. Kokko was one of the persons responsible for drafting the citizens' initiative on Finland's accession to NATO.

In December 2022, Kokko, as chairman of the regional council, interpreted that a person employed by a welfare district directly under the regional government could not serve on the regional government and that the four board members or colour guard should resign from the regional government. However, the regional government decided in December 2022 that the persons could continue as members of the regional government indefinitely.

Kokko is a member of the board of directors of the Central Finland First Aid and Shelter Home Association and the Federal Board of the Association of First Aid and Shelter Homes.
