= Riitta Kaarisalo =

Finnish politician

Member of the Finnish Parliament for Central Finland

Personal details
- Party: Social Democratic Party of Finland

Riitta Leena Kaarisalo (née Mäkinen) is a Finnish politician currently serving in the Parliament of Finland for the Social Democratic Party of Finland at the Central Finland constituency.
