= Piritta Rantanen =

Finnish politician

Piritta Maria Katariina Rantanen

Member of the Finnish Parliament for Central Finland
- Incumbent
- Assumed office 17 April 2019

Personal details
- Born: 19 July 1979 (age 46) Jämsä, Central Finland, Finland
- Party: Social Democratic Party of Finland
- Occupation: Nurse, Politician

Piritta Maria Katariina Rantanen (born 19 July 1979 in Jämsä) is a Finnish politician currently serving in the Parliament of Finland for the Social Democratic Party of Finland at the Central Finland constituency.
