= Taavi Vilhula =

Finnish agronomist and politician (1897–1976)

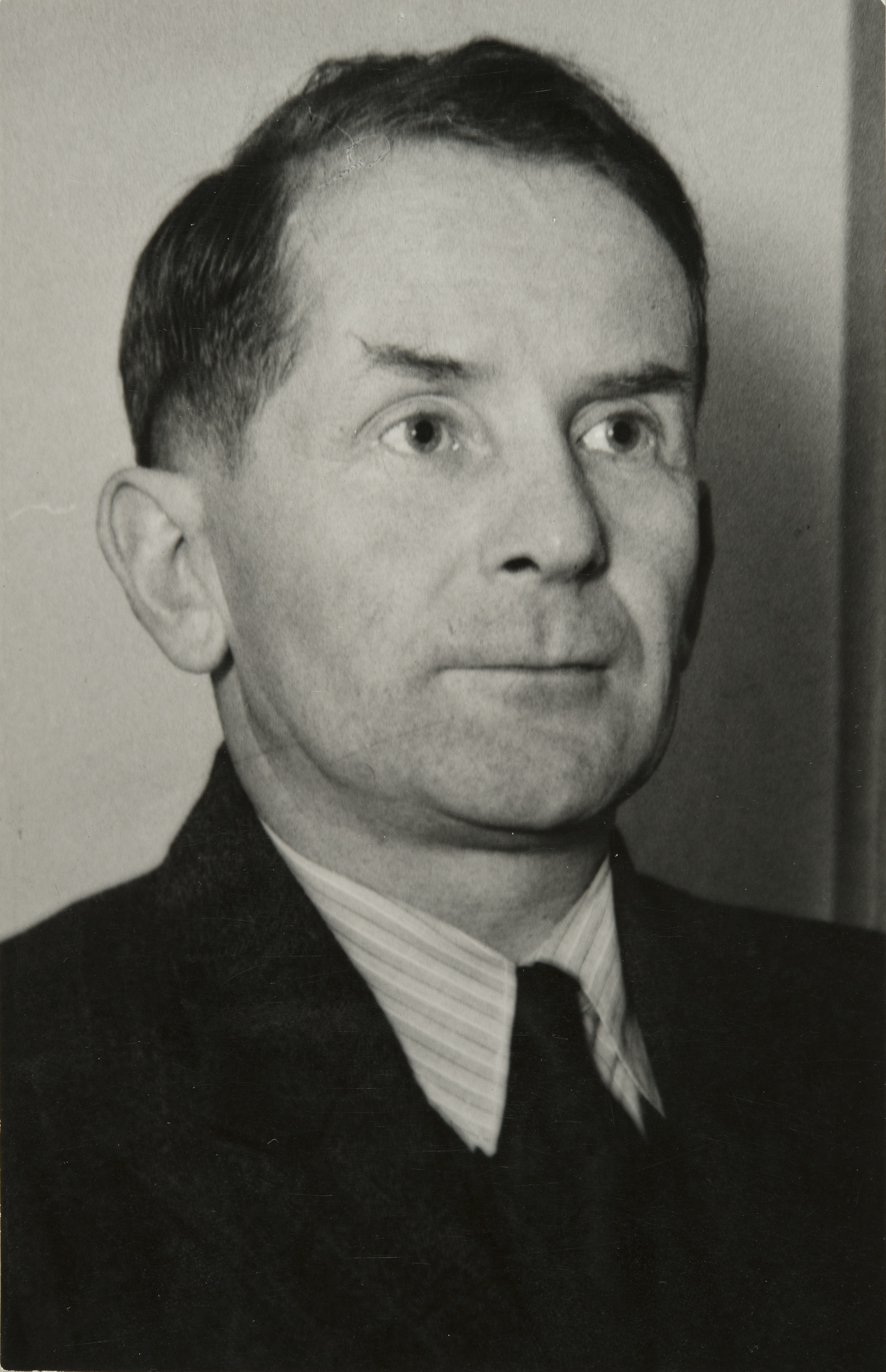
Taavi Vilhula

David (Taavi) Nikolai (T. N.) Vilhula (26 November 1897 – 20 March 1976) was a Finnish agronomist and politician, born in Multia. He was a member of the Parliament of Finland from 1929 to 1930 and from 1933 to 1954, representing the Agrarian League. He served as Minister of People's Service from 26 March 1946 to 29 August 1948 and Minister of Agriculture from 17 January 1950 to 17 January 1951. He was a presidential elector in the 1931, 1937, 1940, 1943 and 1950 presidential elections.
