= Kaarlo Warvikko =

Finnish farmer, bank director and politician (1861–1941)

Karl Johan (Kaarlo Juho, K. J.) Warvikko (22 July 1861 – 1 August 1941) was a Finnish farmer, bank director and politician, born in Saarijärvi. He was a member of the Diet of Finland from 1905 to 1906 and of the Parliament of Finland from 1910 to 1916, representing the Finnish Party.
