= Onni Peltonen =

Finnish engine driver and politician (1894–1969)

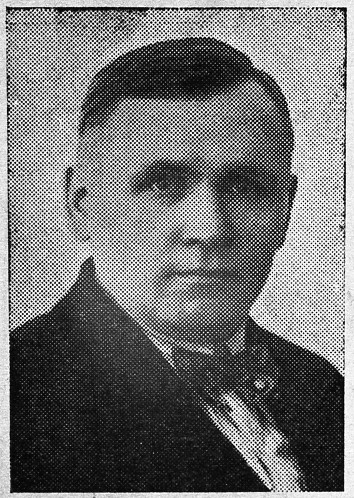
Onni Peltonen in 1936

Onni Evert Peltonen (27 August 1894 – 11 September 1969) was a Finnish engine driver and politician, born in Jyväskylän maalaiskunta. He was a member of the Parliament of Finland from 1933 to 1962, representing the Social Democratic Party of Finland (SDP). He served as Minister of Transport and Public Works from 17 November 1944 to 26 March 1946, from 29 July 1948 to 17 March 1950 and from 17 January 1951 to 29 November 1952, as Deputy Minister of Social Affairs from 26 May to 29 July 1948 and as Minister of Social Affairs from 20 October 1954 to 3 March 1956. He was a presidential elector in the 1931, 1937, 1940, 1943, 1950 and 1956 presidential elections.
