= Lauri Perälä =

Finnish schoolteacher, lay preacher, writer and politician (1881–1942)

Lauri Edvard Perälä (3 August 1881 – 5 April 1942) was a Finnish schoolteacher, lay preacher, writer and politician, born in Alavus. He was a member of the Parliament of Finland from 1919 to 1924, representing the Agrarian League.
