= Aaro Jaskari =

Finnish politician

Aaro Jaskari (1 July 1880 – 28 July 1925) was a Finnish farmer and politician, born in Laihia. He was a member of the Parliament of Finland from 1922 until his death in 1925, representing the National Progressive Party.
