= Juho Haveri =

Finnish politician

Juho Haveri (31 August 1876, Vimpeli – 28 April 1961) was a Finnish schoolteacher and politician. He was a member of the Parliament of Finland from 1907 to 1908 and again from 1909 to 1910, representing the Young Finnish Party.
