= Sakari Knuuttila =

Finnish politician (1930–2023)

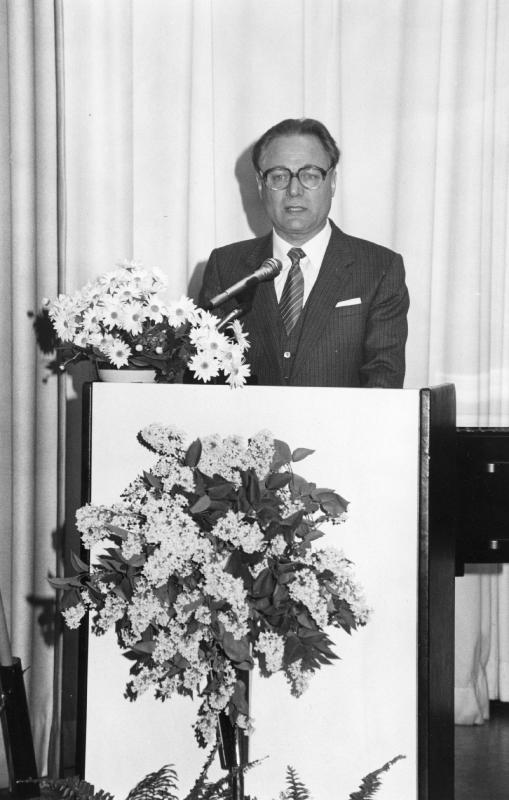
Sakari Knuuttila in 1983

Eero Sakari Knuuttila (5 April 1930 – 4 December 2023) was a Finnish engineer and politician, born in Hamina. He was a member of the Parliament of Finland from 1966 to 1991, representing the Social Democratic Party of Finland (SDP). He was a presidential elector in the 1968, 1978, 1982 and 1988 presidential elections. Knuuttila died on 4 December 2023, at the age of 93.
