= Onni Tuomi =

Finnish journalist and politician (1875–1933)

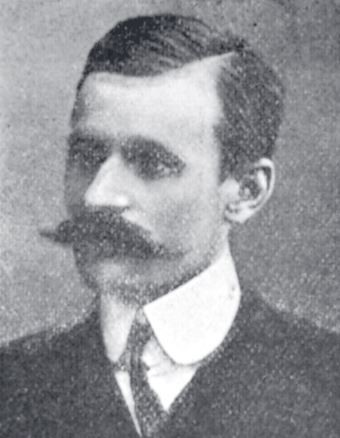
Onni Tuomi in 1909

Onni Aleksanteri Tuomi (21 November 1875 – 4 January 1933; original surname Ahlbom) was a Finnish journalist and politician, born in Virrat. He was a member of the Parliament of Finland from 1908 to 1918, representing the Social Democratic Party of Finland (SDP). During the Finnish Civil War of 1918, he was a member of the Central Workers' Council of Finland, the legislature of the Finnish Socialist Workers' Republic. After the defeat of the Red side, he went into exile in Soviet Russia. He was married to Lempi Tuomi.
