= Kyösti Kanniainen =

Finnish politician

Gustaf Adolf (Kyösti Aatu) Kanniainen (22 February 1871 – 22 June 1915) was a Finnish journalist and politician. He was born in Oulu, and belonged to the Young Finnish Party. He served as a Member of the Diet of Finland from 1905 to 1906 and as a Member of the Parliament of Finland from 1913 to 1915.
