= Tuula Peltonen =

Finnish politician

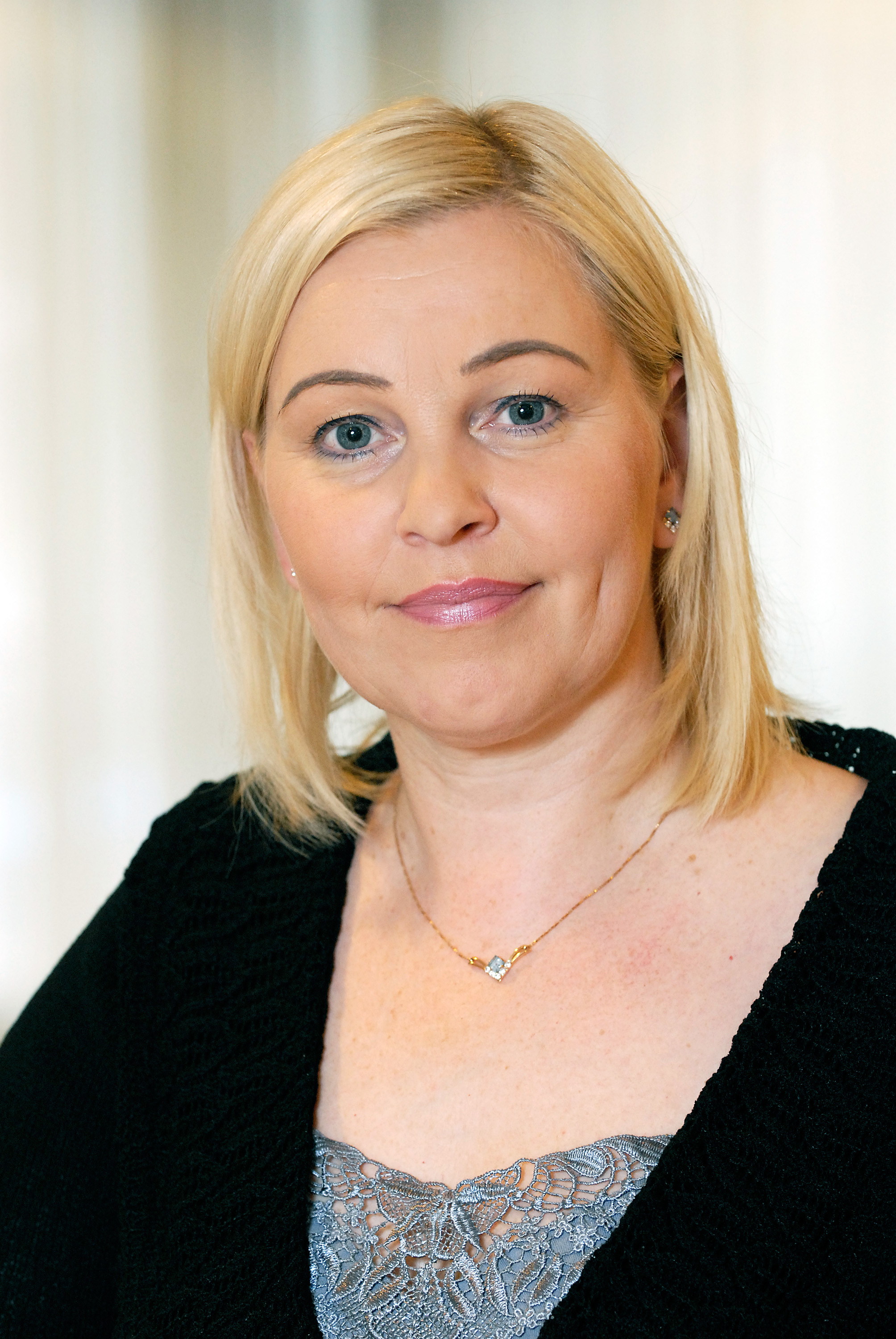
Tuula Peltonen

Tuula Irmeli Peltonen (born 4 September 1962 in Juuka) is a Finnish politician and member of Finnish Parliament, representing the SDP. She has been member of parliament two times: 2007-2011 and 2011-2015.
