= Kaarle Mänty =

Finnish schoolteacher and politician (1865–1937)

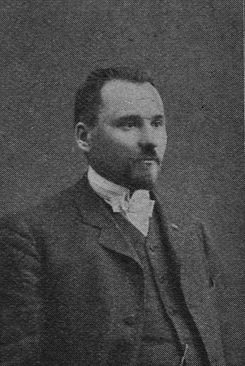
Kaarle Mänty in 1907

Kaarle Oskari Mänty (2 December 1865 – 3 September 1937; original surname Mäkilä) was a Finnish politician, born in Loimaan kunta. He was a member of the Parliament of Finland from 1907 to 1908 and from 1910 to 1918, representing the Social Democratic Party of Finland (SDP). He was imprisoned from 1918 to 1921 for having sided with the Reds during the Finnish Civil War. After the end of his prison sentence, he joined the Socialist Workers' Party of Finland (SSTP). He was once again imprisoned on sedition charges in 1923 and his prison sentence lasted until 1927.
