= Olavi Kämäräinen =

Finnish politician (1922–2014)

Olavi Kämäräinen (17 November 1922, Rauma – 8 August 2014) was a Finnish politician. He was a Member of the Parliament of Finland from 1962 to 1966, representing the Finnish People's Democratic League (SKDL). Kämäräinen was active in the Communist Party of Finland (SKP) as well.
