= Jalmari Kovanen =

Finnish politician

Hjalmar (Jalmari) Kovanen (21 October 1877, Laukaa - 10 January 1936) was a Finnish farmer and politician. He was a member of the Parliament of Finland from 1924 to 1927 and again from 1929 to 1933, representing the Social Democratic Party of Finland (SDP).
