= Matti Latvala =

Finnish politician

Matti Latvala (11 May 1868, Vimpeli - 5 July 1964) was a Finnish farmer and politician. He was a member of the Parliament of Finland from 1909 to 1916 and again from 1919 to 1922, representing the Agrarian League.
