= Aino Takala =

Finnish typographer and politician (1882–1972)

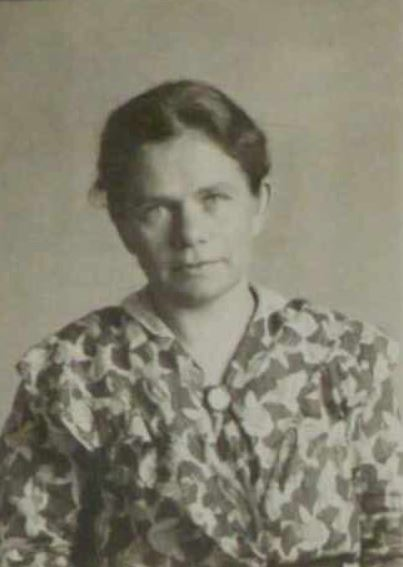
Aina (Aino) Emilia Takala

Aina (Aino) Emilia Takala (28 May 1882 – 9 May 1972; née Seppäläinen) was a Finnish typographer and politician, born in Jyväskylän maalaiskunta. She was a member of the Parliament of Finland from 1916 to 1917, representing the Social Democratic Party of Finland (SDP). During the Finnish Civil War of 1918, she worked in the administration of the Finnish Socialist Workers' Republic. After the defeat of the Red side, she went into exile in Sweden. Takala returned to Finland in 1922. She was given a suspended prison sentence of three years for her role in the Civil War.
