= Väinö Havas =

Finnish Lutheran pastor and politician (1898–1941)

Väinö Rafael Havas
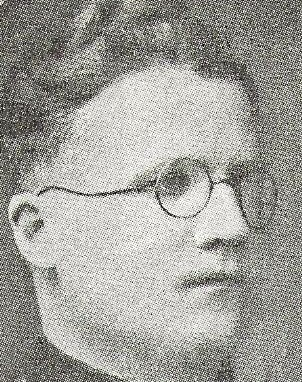
- Born: 15 August 1898; Lempäälä, Grand Duchy of Finland
- Died: 21 August 1941 (aged 43); Ladoga Karelia, Soviet Union
- Cause of death: Killed in action
- Occupations: Lutheran pastor, politician
- Office: Member of the Parliament of Finland
- Political party: National Coalition Party

Väinö Rafael Havas (15 August 1898 – 21 August 1941; surname until 1906 Örling) was a Finnish Lutheran pastor and politician, born in Lempäälä. He was a member of the Parliament of Finland from 1939 to 1941, representing the National Coalition Party. He was a presidential elector in the 1937 and 1940 presidential elections. Havas participated in the Finnish Civil War of 1918 of the White side. Even though he was a Member of Parliament, he volunteered to serve as a reserve officer both in the Winter War of 1939–1940 and later in the Continuation War. He was killed in action on 21 August 1941.
