= Olavi Tupamäki =

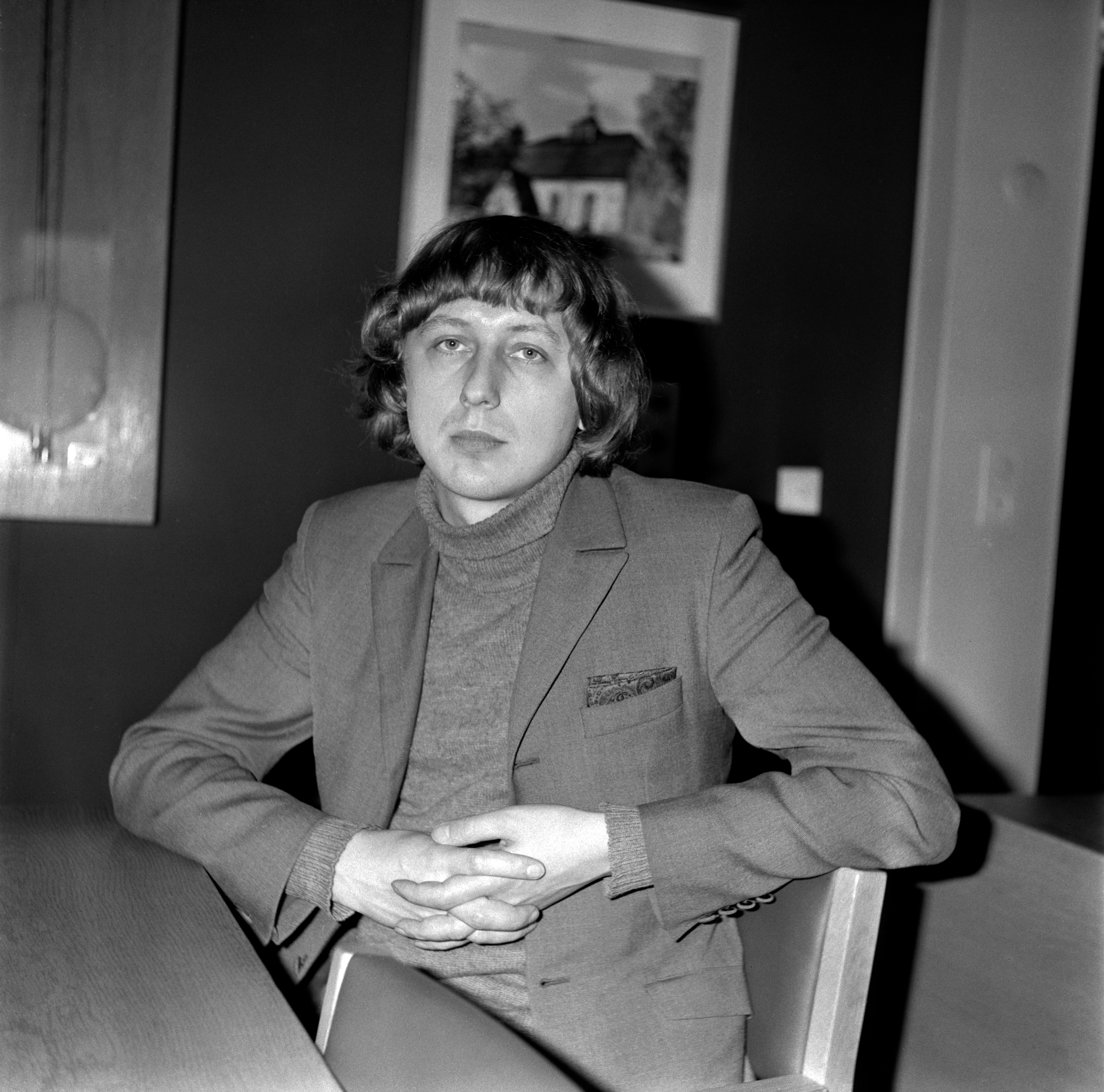
Olavi Tupamaki

Olavi Tupamäki (born 21 October 1944) is a Finnish engineer and politician, born in Petäjävesi in the Central Finland region. He was a member of the Parliament of Finland, representing the Finnish Rural Party (SMP) from 1970 to 1972 and the Finnish People's Unity Party (SKYP) from 1972 to 1975.
