= Lempi Tuomi =

Finnish seamstress and politician (1882-1958)

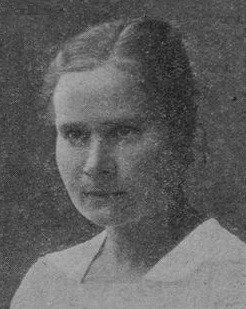
Lempi Tuomi

Lempi Maria Tuomi (28 August 1882 in Virrat - 24 March 1958) was a Finnish seamstress and politician. She was a member of the Parliament of Finland from 1922 to 1923, representing the Socialist Workers' Party of Finland (SSTP). She was imprisoned from 1923 to 1924 on sedition charges. She was married to Onni Tuomi.
