= Eemil Vekara =

Finnish agronomist and politician (1874–1933)

Emil Henrik (Eemil Heikki) Vekara (12 November 1874 – 16 February 1933; surname until 1906 Krook) was a Finnish agronomist and politician, born in Karstula. He was a member of the Parliament of Finland from 1917 to 1919, representing the Young Finnish Party until December 1918 and the National Progressive Party after that.
