= Artturi Koskinen =

Finnish politician

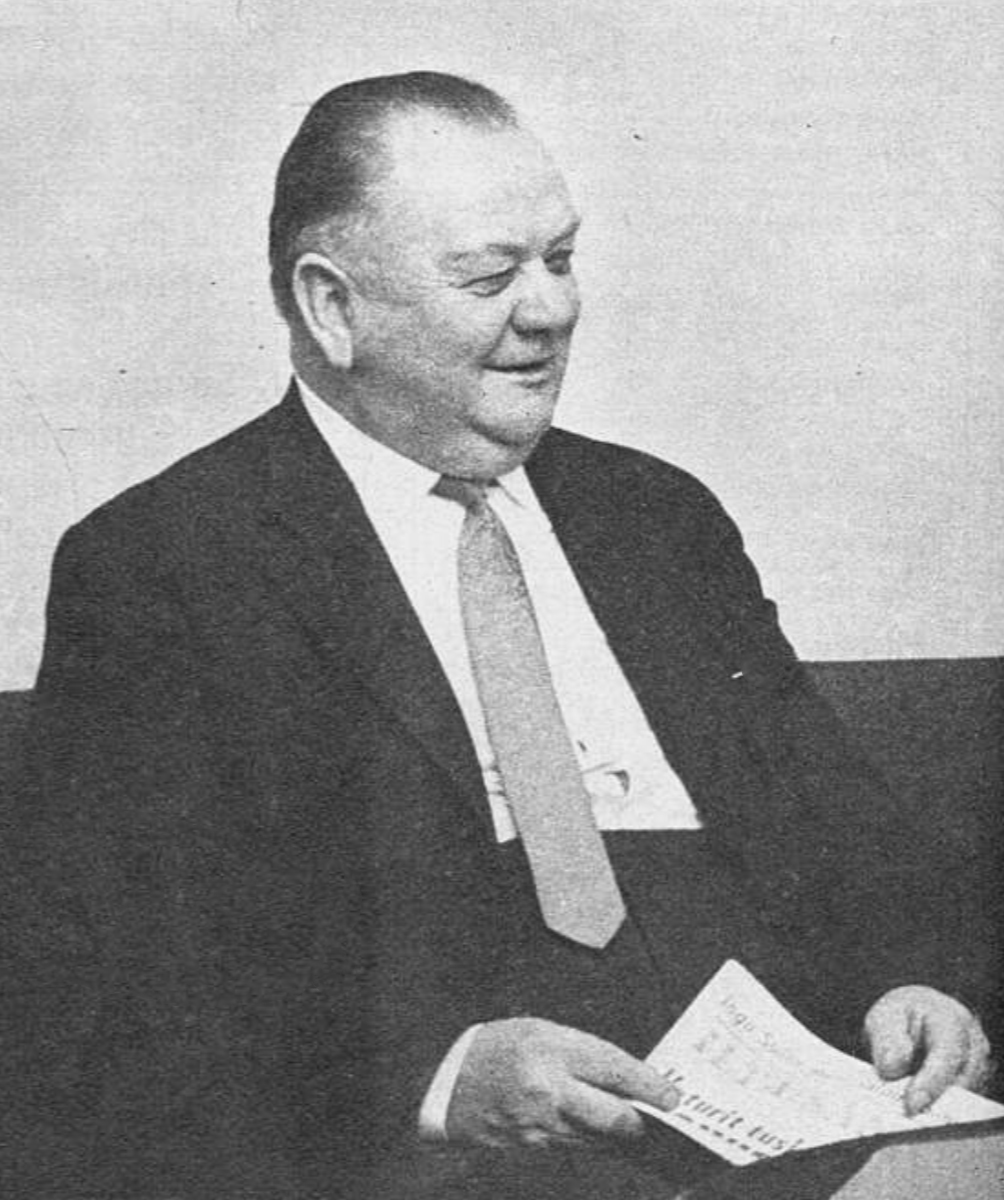
Artturi Koskinen

Eino Artturi Koskinen (9 June 1904 – 19 May 1981) was a Finnish smallholder and politician. He was a member of the Parliament of Finland from 1948 to 1958 and again from 1962 to 1970, representing the Social Democratic Party of Finland (SDP).
