= Samuli Rantanen =

Finnish tenant farmer and politician (1861–1918)

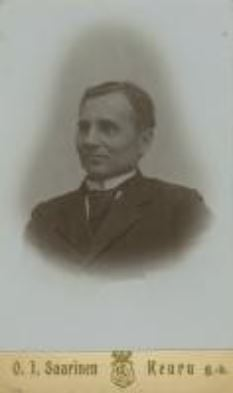
Samuli Rantanen

Samuli Rantanen (8 May 1861 – 3 February 1918) was a Finnish tenant farmer and politician, born in Keuruu. He was a member of the Parliament of Finland from 1907 to 1911 and from 1916 to 1917, representing the Social Democratic Party of Finland (SDP). Shortly after the beginning of the Finnish Civil War of 1918, he was arrested by a detachment of White Guards who were conducting a purge against political opponents. He was taken to Seinäjoki, where he was summarily executed on 3 February 1918.
