= Bruno Sarlin =

Finnish jurist and politician (1878–1951)

Bruno Gustaf Willehad Sarlin (8 November 1878 – 6 January 1951) was a Finnish jurist and politician, born in Viitasaari. He was a member of the Parliament of Finland from 1919 to 1920, from 1930 to 1936 and from 1945 to 1948, representing the National Progressive Party. He served as Minister of Social Affairs from 1935 to 1936. Sarlin was the governor of Vaasa Province from 1920 to 1930. He was a presidential elector in the 1931 1937, 1940 and 1943 presidential elections.
