= Kustaa Jalkanen =

Finnish politician

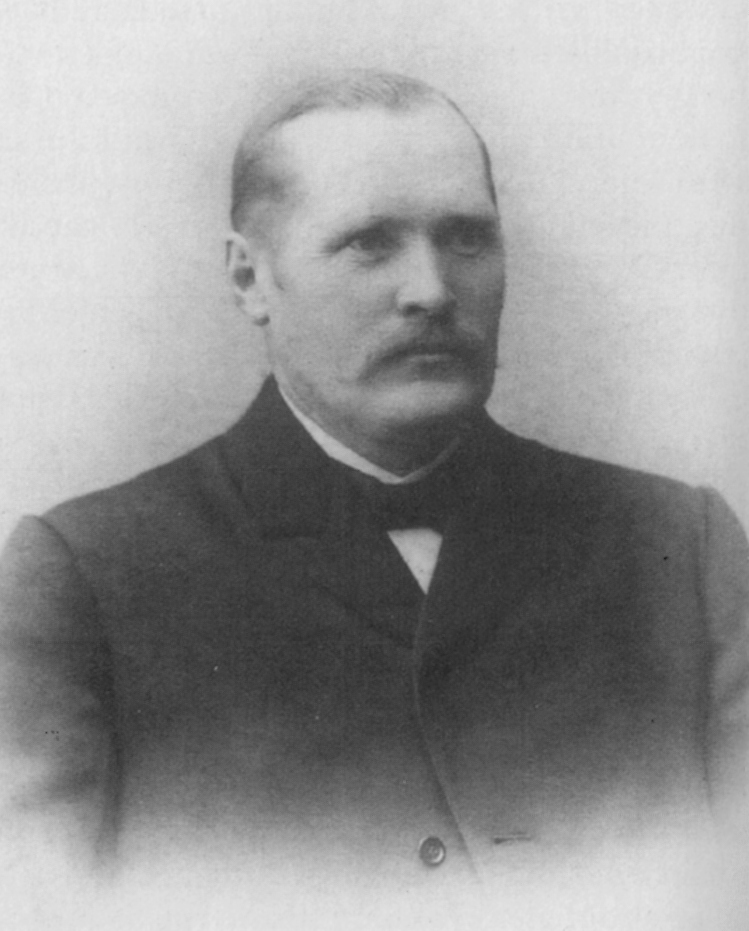
Kustaa Jalkanen

Kustaa Jalkanen (17 May 1862, Rautalampi – 23 April 1921) was a Finnish farmer and politician. He belonged to the Young Finnish Party. Jalkanen served as a Member of the Diet of Finland from 1904 to 1905 and as a Member of the Parliament of Finland from 1911 to 1913.
