= Eino Palovesi =

Finnish farmer and politician (1904–1980)

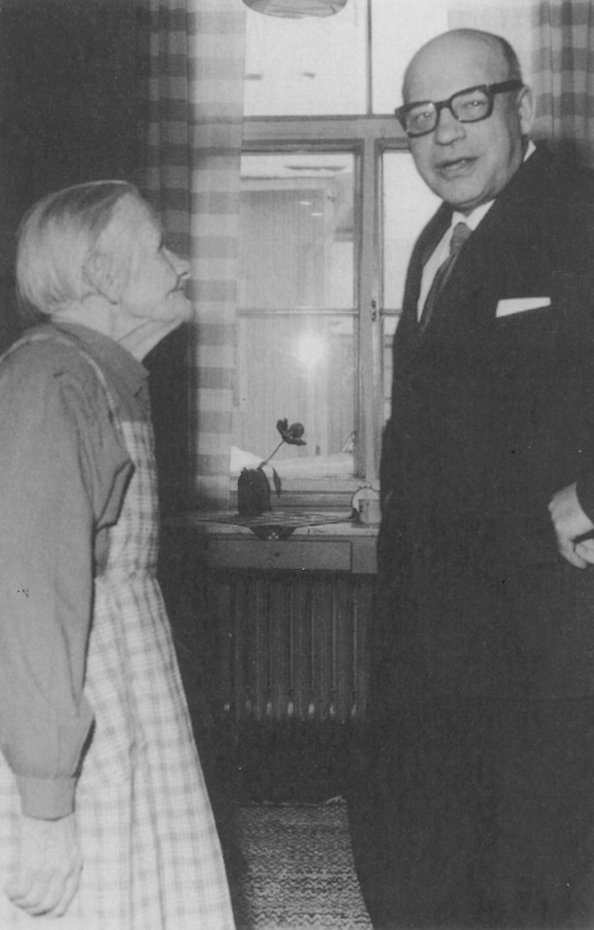
Eino Palovesi in 1962

Eino Oskari Palovesi (19 May 1904 – 25 February 1980; surname until 1947 Möttönen) was a Finnish farmer and politician, born in Perho. He was a member of the Parliament of Finland from 1939 to 1960, representing the Agrarian League. He served as Minister of Transport and Public Works from 3 March 1956 to 27 May 1957 and as Minister of the Interior from 13 January 1959 to 4 February 1960. He was the governor of Central Finland Province from 1960 to 1971. He was a presidential elector in the 1937, 1940, 1943, 1950 and 1956 presidential elections.
