= Anne Kalmari =

Finnish politician (born 1968)

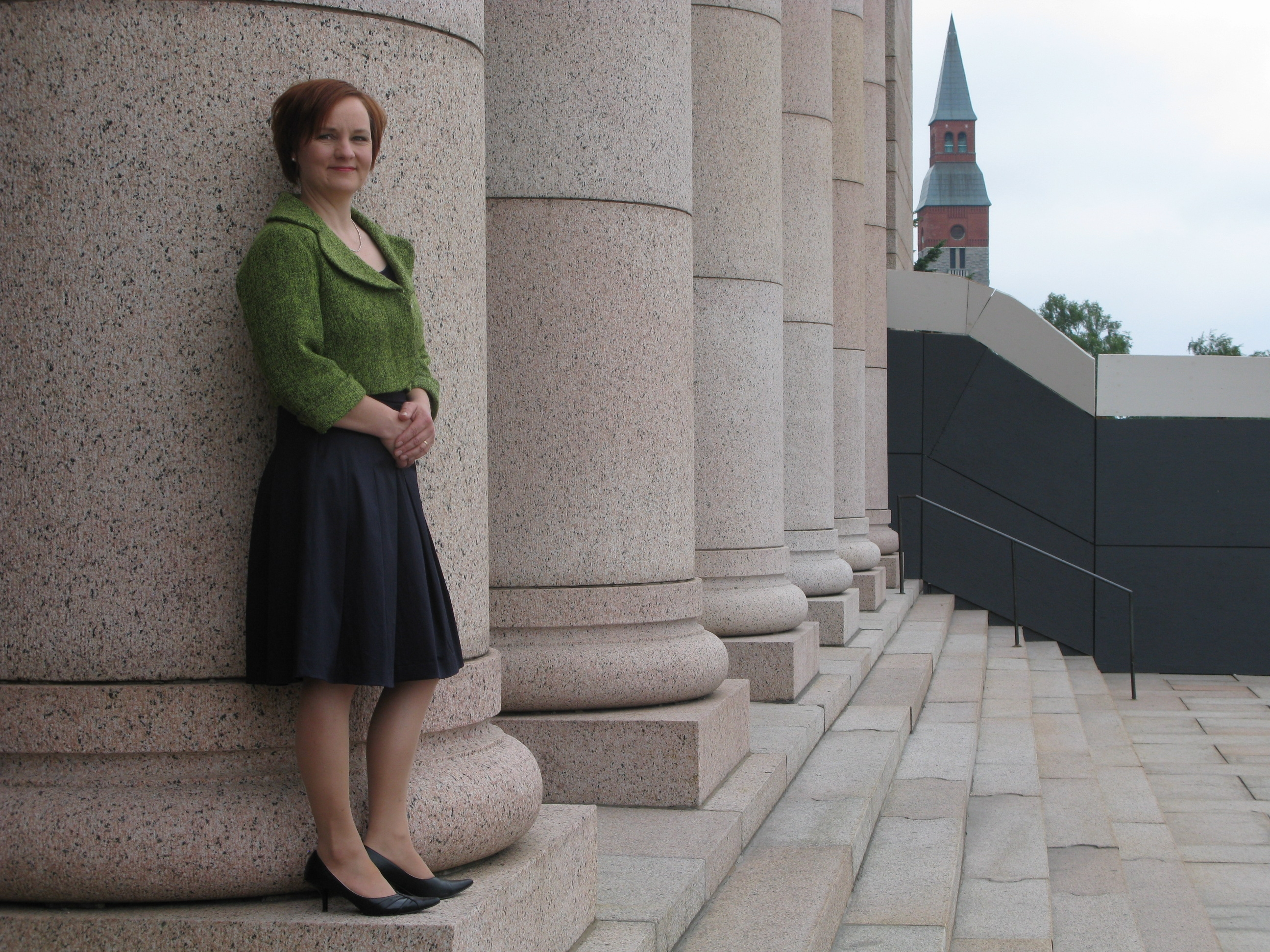
Anne Kalmari

Anne Inkeri Kalmari (born 20 April 1968 in Kivijärvi, Finland) is a Finnish politician. She is the vice chairman of the Finnish Centre Party (Keskusta). She has been a member of the Finnish Parliament since 21 March 2007.

In addition to her role in parliament, Kalmari has been serving as member of the Finnish delegation to the Parliamentary Assembly of the Council of Europe since 2015. As member of the Centre Party, she is part of the Alliance of Liberals and Democrats for Europe group. She is a member of the Committee on Social Affairs, Health and Sustainable Development, the Sub-Committee on Public Health and Sustainable Development and the Sub-Committee on relations with the Organisation for Economic Co-operation and Development (OECD) and the European Bank for Reconstruction and Development (EBRD).

Kalmari has a master's degree in agriculture and forestry from the University of Helsinki. She has been a farmer since 1991.
