= Ville Puumalainen =

Finnish politician (1900–1962)

Member of the Parliament of Finland
- In office 1945–1954

Personal details
- Born: 20 June 1900 Rautalampi, Finland
- Died: 24 October 1962 (aged 62)
- Party: Finnish People's Democratic League
- Other political affiliations: Communist Party of Finland
- Occupation: Bricklayer, politician
- Known for: Political imprisonment (1931–1932)

Ville Puumalainen (20 June 1900 – 24 October 1962) was a Finnish bricklayer and politician. He was imprisoned for political reasons from 1931 to 1932. Puumalainen was a Member of the Parliament of Finland from 1945 to 1954, representing the Finnish People's Democratic League (SKDL). He belonged to the Communist Party of Finland (SKP) as well.
