= Emanuel Pohjaväre =

Finnish politician (1875–1949)

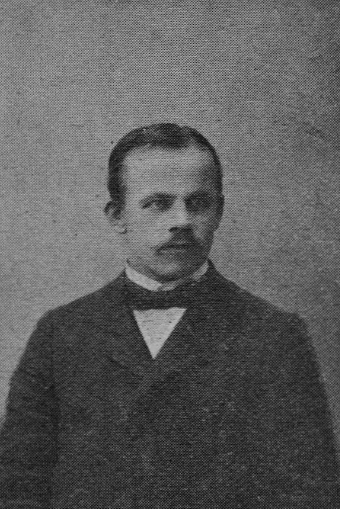
Emanuel Pohjaväre in 1906

Emanuel Pohjaväre (29 April 1875 – 31 December 1949; surname until 1906 Helin) was a Finnish politician, born in Teisko. He was a member of the Parliament of Finland from 1907 to 1909 and from 1910 to 1917, representing the Social Democratic Party of Finland (SDP). During the Finnish Civil War of 1918, he worked in the administration of the Finnish Socialist Workers' Republic. After the defeat of the Red side, he went into exile in Soviet Russia. He moved to Soviet Karelia, where he worked as a schoolteacher. He died in 1949 in Petrozavodsk, in the Karelo-Finnish Soviet Socialist Republic.
