= Aleksanteri Koivisto =

Finnish farmer and politician (1863–1921)

Aleksanteri Koivisto (23 May 1863 – 22 December 1921; original surname Märjenjärvi) was a Finnish farmer and politician, born in Kuortane. He was a member of the Diet of Finland from 1905 to 1906 and of the Parliament of Finland from 1907 until his death in 1921, representing the Finnish Party until December 1918 and the National Coalition Party after that.
