= Oskari Heikinheimo =

Finnish physician and politician (1873–1950)

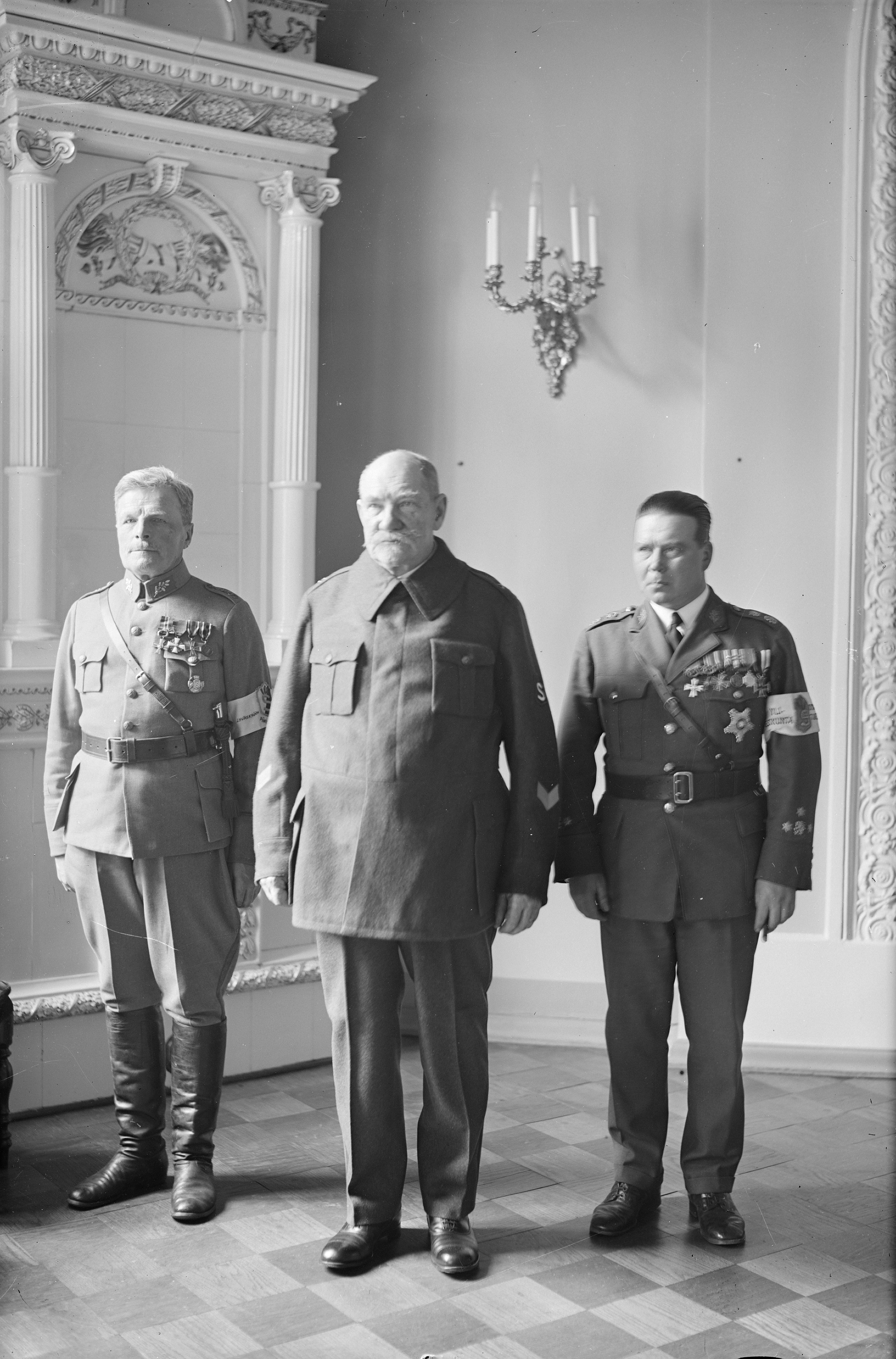
Oskari Heikinheimo (left) with Pehr Evind Svinhufvud and Lauri Malmberg in 1931

Oskari Fredrik Heikinheimo (3 August 1873 – 27 March 1950; surname until 1906 Heikel) was a Finnish physician and politician, born in Kittilä. He was a member of the Parliament of Finland from 1922 to 1927 and from 1941 to 1945, representing the National Coalition Party.
