= Atte Muhonen =

Finnish politician

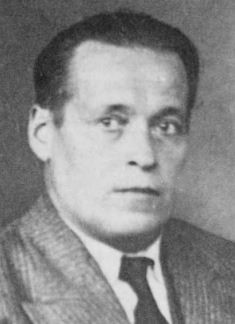
Finland Atte

Atte Johannes Muhonen (20 October 1888, Laukaa - 16 February 1954) was a Finnish farmer and politician. He was a member of the Parliament of Finland from 1922 to 1929 and again from 1936 to 1939, representing the Social Democratic Party of Finland (SDP).
