= William Koskelin =

Finnish farmer, banker, agronomist and politician (1865–1957)

Karl William (K. W.) Koskelin (16 May 1865 – 12 September 1957) was a Finnish farmer, banker, agronomist and politician, born in Saarijärvi. He was a member of the Diet of Finland in 1899, 1900, from 1904 to 1905 and 1905 to 1906 and of the Parliament of Finland from 1907 to 1909, from 1910 to 1911 and from 1916 to 1917, representing the Young Finnish Party.
