= Pentti Sillantaus =

Finnish jurist and politician (1923–1998)

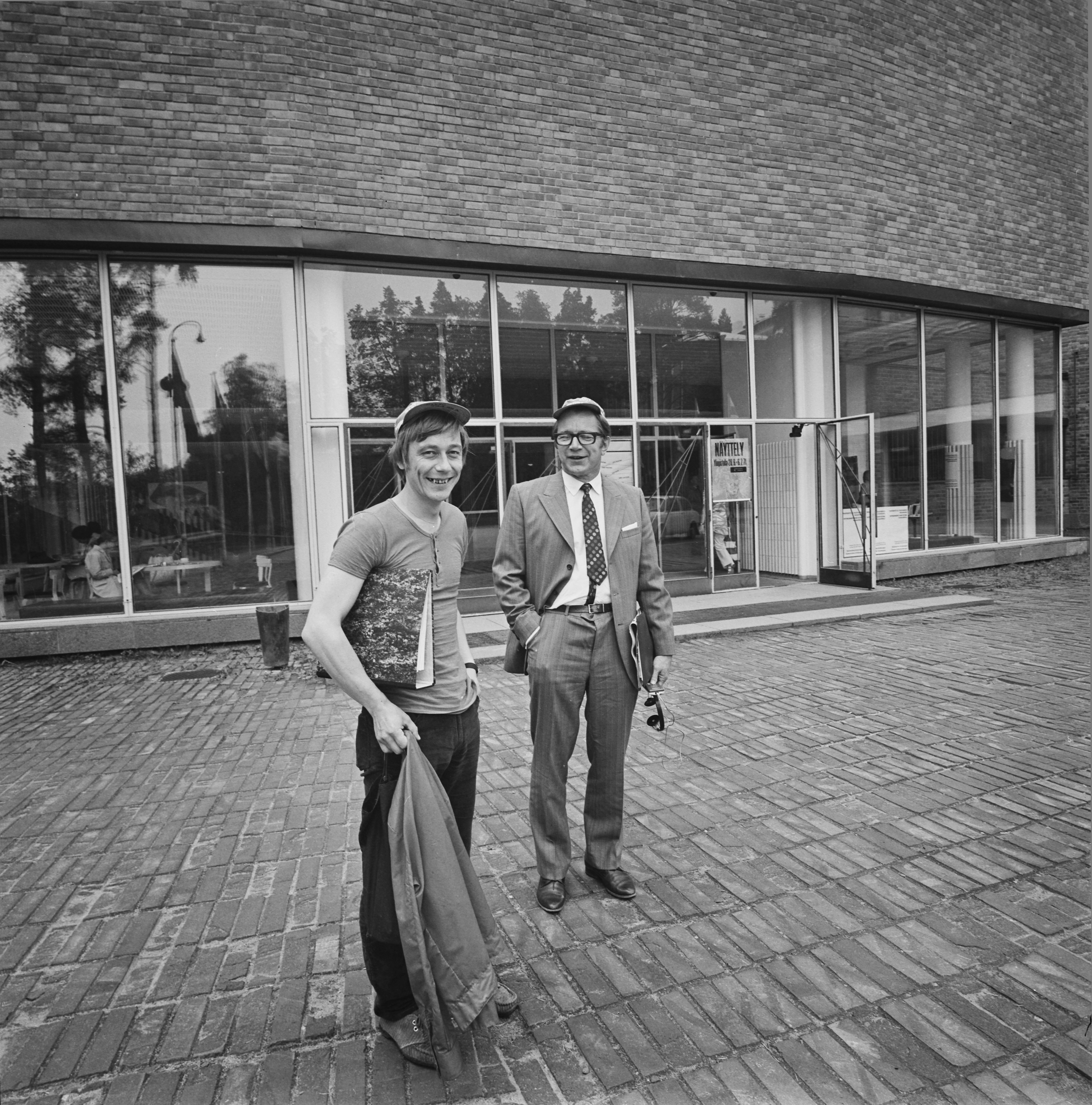
Sillantaus with reporter Hannu Taanila in 1971

Pentti Ilmari Sillantaus (30 May 1923 – 4 July 1998) was a Finnish jurist and politician, born in Saarijärvi. He was a member of the Parliament of Finland from 1962 to 1972 and from 1975 to 1979, representing the National Coalition Party. He was a presidential elector in the 1968 and 1978 presidential elections.
