= Arvo Ahonen =

Finnish politician (1918–1991)

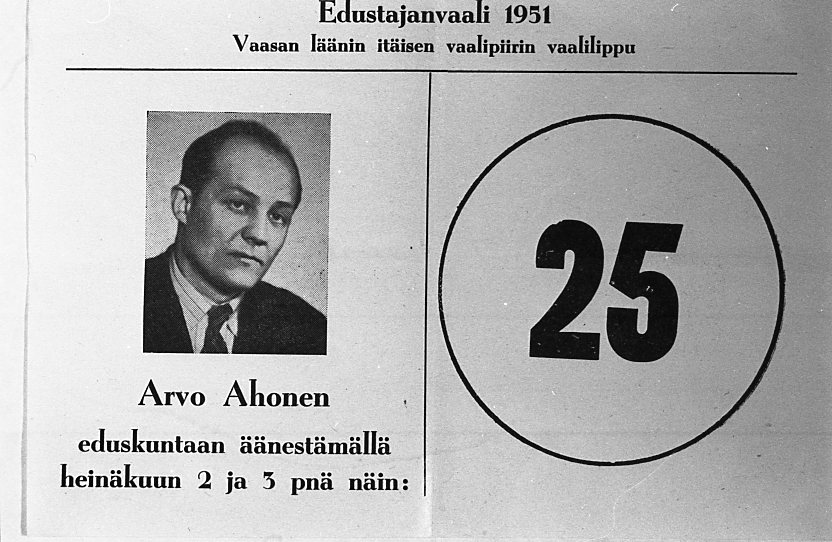
Arvo Ahonen in 1951

Arvo Ilmari Ahonen (27 January 1918 – 16 June 1991) was a Finnish politician, born in Multia. He was a member of the Parliament of Finland from 1951 to 1979, representing the Social Democratic Party of Finland (SDP). He was a presidential elector in the 1956, 1962, 1968, 1978 and 1982 presidential elections.
