= Santeri Mäkelä =

Finnish politician (1870–1938)

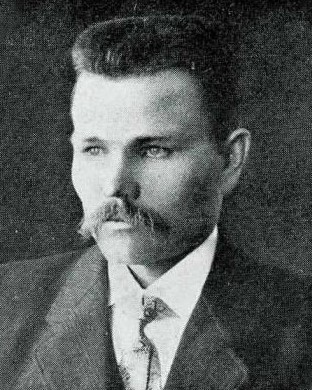
Mäkelä in 1910

Aleksanteri (Santeri) Mäkelä (26 March 1870 – 1938) was a Finnish smallholder, writer and politician. Born in Vimpeli, he immigrated to the United States in 1899 and returned to Finland in 1907. Mäkelä was a member of the Parliament of Finland from 1910 to 1914 and again from 1917 to 1918, representing the Social Democratic Party of Finland. During the Finnish Civil War, he worked in the administration of Red Finland. When the Red side lost the war, he fled to Soviet Russia and joined the Communist Party of Finland (SKP), which was founded by Finnish political refugees on 29 August 1918 in Moscow. He settled in the Soviet Union for the rest of his life, working as a propagandist, as a journalist, as a teacher and in other functions. Mäkelä probably died in prison custody in the Soviet Union in 1938.
