= Aleksi Kiviaho =

Finnish politician

Aleksi Kiviaho (17 September 1913, Evijärvi - 1 July 1986) was a Finnish smallholder and politician. He was a member of the Parliament of Finland from 1954 to 1970, representing the Finnish People's Democratic League (SKDL).
