= Aleksi Hakala =

Finnish politician

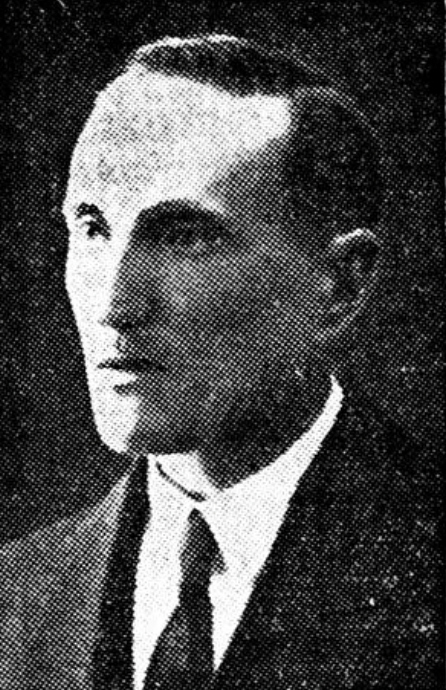
Aleksi Hakala, 1937

Aleksanteri (Aleksi) Hakala (5 November 1886 in Lappajärvi – 19 April 1959; original surname Sironen) was a Finnish farmer and politician. He was a member of the Parliament of Finland from 1927 to 1933, representing the Agrarian League.
