= Akseli Listo =

Finnish jurist, civil servant and politician (1856–1921)

Akseli August Listo (formerly Lilius; 2 April 1856 – 17 November 1921) was a Finnish jurist, civil servant and politician, born in Hattula. He was a member of the Diet of Finland in 1894, 1897, 1899 and 1900 and of the Parliament of Finland from 1907 to 1917, representing the Finnish Party.
