= Matti Koivunen =

Finnish construction worker and politician (1919–1997)

Paavo Matias (Matti) Koivunen (12 January 1919 – 28 July 1997) was a Finnish construction worker and politician, born in Ruovesi. Koivunen was a member of the Communist Party of Finland (SKP). He was a member of the Parliament of Finland from 1951 to 1972, representing the Finnish People's Democratic League (SKDL). He served as Minister of Social Affairs from 27 May 1966 to 22 March 1968. He was a presidential elector in the 1956, 1962 and 1968 presidential elections.
