= Aune Salama =

Finnish schoolteacher and politician (1908–1999)

Aune Ilona Salama (10 August 1908 – 16 November 1999; née Tuominen) was a Finnish schoolteacher and politician, born in Helsinki. She was a member of the Parliament of Finland from 1966 to 1975, representing the Social Democratic Party of Finland (SDP). She was a presidential elector in the 1968 Finnish presidential election.
