= Mikko Luopajärvi =

Finnish farmer and politician (1871–1920)

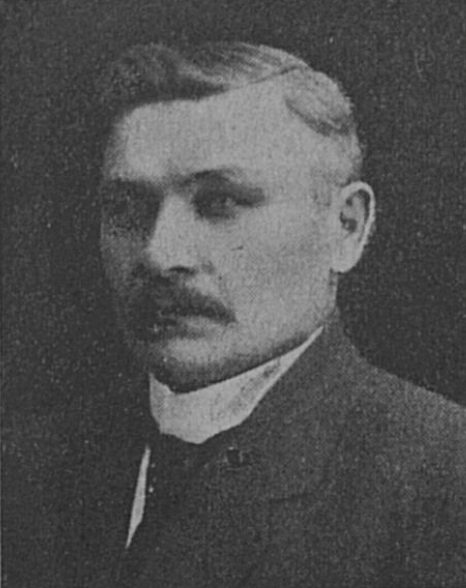
Image of Mikko Luopajärvi in 1920

Mikko Luopajärvi (15 November 1871 – 5 January 1920) was a Finnish farmer and politician, born in Jalasjärvi. He was a member of the Parliament of Finland from 1913 until his death in 1920, representing the Agrarian League (ML). He served as a cabinet minister from 1919 to 1920.
