= Oskar Kaipio =

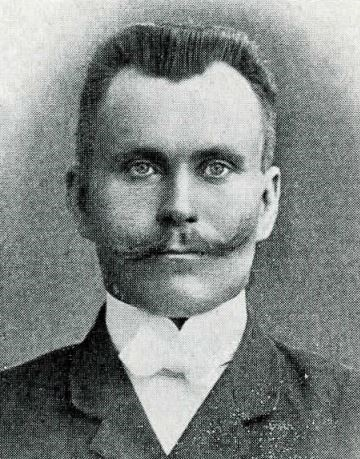
Image of O. V. Kaipio

Oskar Wiljam Kaipio (8 May 1874, Laukaa – 3 May 1918, Uusikirkko) was a Finnish journalist, farmer and politician. He was a member of the Parliament of Finland from 1908 till 1910 and represented the Social Democratic Party of Finland (SDP). During the Finnish Civil War he sided with the Reds, was made prisoner by White troops and shot in Uusikirkko on 3 May 1918.
