= Veikko Turunen =

Finnish priest and politician (1930–2006)

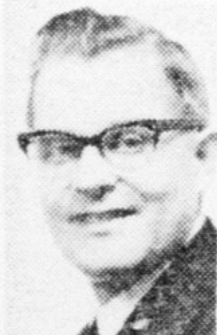

Veikko Johannes Turunen (19 June 1930, in Harlu – 18 July 2006) was a Finnish Lutheran clergyman and politician. He was a member of the Parliament of Finland from 1972 to 1975, representing the Finnish Christian League.
