= Paavo Vesterinen =

Finnish politician (1918–1993)

Paavo Viktor Vesterinen (2 March 1918, in Laukaa – 26 June 1993) was a Finnish farmer and politician. He was a member of the Parliament of Finland from 1975 to 1987, representing the Centre Party. Vihtori Vesterinen was his father.
