= Samuli Häkkinen =

Finnish politician

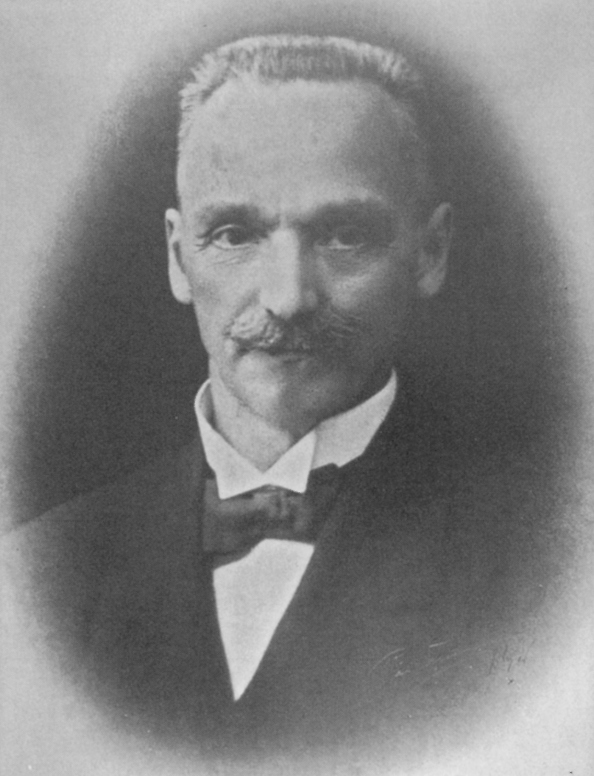
Samuli Häkkinen

Samuel (Samuli) Häkkinen (28 August 1857 - 6 May 1918) was a Finnish schoolteacher and politician, born in Saarijärvi in the Central Finland region. He was a member of the Parliament of Finland from 1907 to 1908 and from 1913 until his death in 1918. During the Finnish Civil War, he sided with the Reds, was taken prisoner by the White troops, indicted for treason and shot in Viipuri on 6 May 1918.
