= Väinö Rankila =

Finnish politician

Väinö Johannes Rankila (19 July 1911 in Vimpeli – 27 November 1970) was a Finnish farmer and politician. He was a member of the Parliament of Finland from 1948 to 1958, representing the Agrarian League.
