= Matti Jaatinen =

Finnish politician

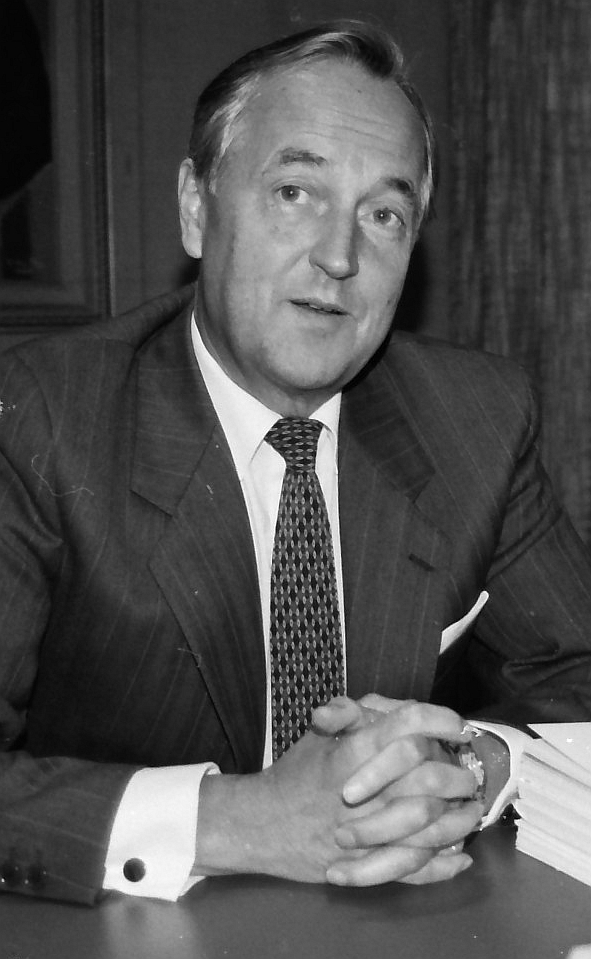
Matti jaatinen 1986

Matti Risto Väinö Jaatinen (15 April 1928x – 29 July 2005) was a Finnish politician. He was born in Vääri and was a Member of the Parliament of Finland from 1970 to 1984, representing the National Coalition Party. He served as the governor of Kymi Province from 1984 to 1993.
