= Vihtori Vesterinen =

Finnish politician

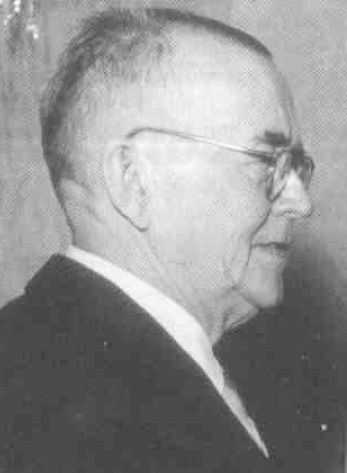
Vihtori Vesterinen

Vihtori Vesterinen (27 January 1885 in Kivijärvi – 28 June 1958) was a Finnish farmer and politician. He served as Deputy Minister of Agriculture from 31 March 1925 to 13 December 1926 and again from 17 December 1927 to 16 October 1928, Deputy Minister of Transport and Public Works from 7 October 1936 to 13 December 1937, Minister of Agriculture from 9 November 1945 to 29 July 1948, Deputy Minister of Social Affairs from 17 March 1950 to 17 January 1951, Deputy Minister of Transport and Public Works from 31 March 1950 to 17 January 1951 and Minister of Social Affairs from 17 January to 20 September 1951. He was a member of the Parliament of Finland from 1919 to 1951, representing the Agrarian League. He was the father of Paavo Vesterinen.
