= Mauno Pohjonen =

Finnish politician (1907–1987)

Mauno Vilho Pohjonen (25 January 1907 – 7 October 1987) was a Finnish agronomist, civil servant and politician, born in Kärkölä. He was a Member of the Parliament of Finland from 1960 to 1970 and again from 1971 to 1972, representing the Agrarian League, which renamed itself the Centre Party in 1965.
