= Impi Lukkarinen =

Finnish journalist and politician

Impi Lydia Lukkarinen (17 May 1918, Äänekoski - 21 January 2010) was a Finnish journalist and politician. At first she was a member of the Social Democratic Party of Finland and, after 1959, of the Social Democratic Union of Workers and Smallholders. She served as a Member of Parliament (21 July 1951 - 22 March 1970).
