= Veikko Hyytiäinen =

Finnish lawyer and politician

Veikko Aukusti Hyytiäinen (9 January 1919, Jyväskylä - 17 May 2000) was a Finnish lawyer and politician. He began his political career in the National Progressive Party. Later he was elected to the Parliament of Finland, where he represented the People's Party of Finland from 1958 to 1965 and the Liberal People's Party from 1965 to 1966.
