= List of Finnish MPs who died in office =

The following is a list of members of the Parliament of Finland who died in office.

Member	Party/Parliamentary group	Date of death	Age at death (years)	Details
Oskar Hainari	Finnish	23 January 1910	53	
Frans Rapola	Finnish	20 March 1910	47	
Justus Ripatti	Finnish	16 January 1912	49	
Kalle Viljakainen	Young Finnish	17 April 1913	60	
Juho Lallukka	Finnish	1 December 1913	61	
Leo Mechelin	RKP	26 January 1914	74	
Kyösti Kanniainen	Young Finnish	22 June 1915	44	
William Lundström	SDP	17 July 1915	35	
Kalle Kustaa Pykälä	Agrarian	2 October 1915	50	Murdered as personal revenge for exposing perjury during a dispute for ownership of a forest plot
Heikki Häyrynen	SDP	20 October 1915	39	
Arvid Neovius	RKP	28 January 1916	54	
Reinhold Grönvall	Finnish	3 March 1916	64	
John Hedberg	RKP	12 April 1916	76	
Antti Mikkola	Young Finnish	1 February 1918	48	Killed by Red Guards
Ernst Saari	Finnish	29 March 1918	35	Killed by Red Guards
Juho Lehmus	SDP	6 April 1918	59	Executed by the White Guard
Samuli Häkkinen	SDP	6 May 1918	60	Executed by the White Guard
Georg W. Johansson	SDP	9 May 1918	40	Suicide
Juho Hakkinen	SDP	16 May 1918	45	Executed by the White Guard
Juho Rikkonen	SDP	16 May 1918	43	Executed by the White Guard
Vilho Lehokas	SDP	May 1918	42	Executed by the White Guard
Albin Valjakka	SDP	29 June 1918	40	Died at Tammisaari prison camp
Julius Nurminen	SDP	24 July 1918	31	Died while imprisoned by the White Guard
Edla Lyytinen	SDP	21 May 1919	48	
Väinö Vankkoja	SDP	10 August 1919	38	Pulmonary tuberculosis
Sikstus Rönnberg	SDP	30 August 1919	58	
Mikko Luopajärvi	Agrarian	5 January 1920	48	
Taavetti Heimonen	National Progressive	1 June 1920	49	
Penna Paunu	SDP	24 August 1920	51	
Toivo Turtiainen	SDP	12 September 1920	36	
Matti Helenius-Seppälä	SKrTL	18 October 1920	50	
Oskari Leivo	SDP	12 December 1921	45	
Aleksanteri Koivisto	National Coalition	22 December 1921	58	
Heikki Ritavuori	National Progressive	14 February 1922	41	Assassinated
Leonard Typpö	National Coalition	27 June 1922	54	
Alex Alfthan	National Coalition	3 July 1922	56	
Evert Huttunen	SDP	29 March 1924	39	Pneumonia
Aaro Jaskari	National Progressive	28 July 1925	45	Lightning strike
Pekka Meriläinen	SDP	9 April 1926	40	Suicide
Valentin Annala	SDP	16 October 1926	66	Stroke
Kaarlo Saari	SDP	25 February 1927	69	Heart failure
Juho Komulainen	Independent	10 April 1927	52	Complications from surgery
Janne Ihamuotila	Agrarian	21 January 1929	60	
Taavi Tainio	SDP	17 March 1929	54	
Ida Vihuri	SDP	7 September 1929	47	Sinking of SS Kuru
Georg Schauman	RKP	6 October 1930	60	
Walto Tuomioja	National Progressive	2 October 1931	43	
Hilda Seppälä	SDP	31 March 1932	52	Influenza
Taavetti Nuutinen	SDP	25 November 1932	41	
Juho Kaskinen	National Progressive	2 December 1932	66	
Emanuel Aromaa	SDP	14 January 1933	59	Kidney disease
Aleksanteri Koskenheimo	National Coalition	18 February 1933	56	
Julius Ailio	SDP	4 March 1933	60	
Bror Hannes Päivänsalo	National Coalition	23 August 1933	57	
Juho Ryynänen	Agrarian	18 September 1933	59	
Kalle Myllymäki	SDP	12 October 1933	50	Stomach cancer
Mikko Suokas	SDP	13 October 1934	41	
Axel Åhlström	SDP	26 October 1934	43	
Martti Rantanen	National Coalition	23 June 1935	50	
Hilja Pärssinen	SDP	23 September 1935	59	
Jooseppi Kauranen	Agrarian	8 November 1935	55	
Matti Puittinen	SDP	30 January 1937	53	
Viljo Kilpeläinen	SDP	12 May 1937	30	
Eetu Vaarama	National Coalition	29 January 1938	59	
Juho Kaakinen	Agrarian	10 April 1938	41	
Rafael Colliander	RKP	25 May 1938	60	
Kaarlo Hänninen	Agrarian	25 March 1939	62	
Hannes Ryömä	SDP	22 May 1939	61	
Toivo Janhonen	Agrarian	3 November 1939	48	Stroke
Kaarlo Mikkola	Agrarian	28 May 1940	48	
Aleksi Lehtonen	SDP	2 September 1940	43	
Elsa Metsäranta	SDP	25 January 1941	53	
Väinö Havas	National Coalition	21 August 1941	43	Killed in action in the Continuation War
Kaarlo Kares	Patriotic People's Movement	23 March 1942	68	
Antti Halonen	Agrarian	5 July 1942	57	
Jalmari Pilkama	National Coalition	12 August 1942	61	
Ville Komu	SDP	15 November 1942	47	
Aimo Cajander	National Progressive	21 January 1943	63	
Anni Huotari	SDP	15 April 1943	68	
Alex Hämäläinen	SDP	28 August 1943	49	
Väinö Kokko	National Coalition	5 December 1943	63	
Matti Luoma-aho	Agrarian	27 December 1943	58	
Kustaa Perho	SDP	8 June 1944	59	
Albin Koponen	SDP	10 November 1944	63	
Ragnar Furuhjelm	RKP	15 November 1944	65	
Reino Uusisalmi	SKDL	14 June 1945	46	
Karl Wiik	SDP	26 June 1946	63	
Toivo Järvinen	SKDL	24 April 1947	51	
Kalle Hakala	SDP	16 May 1947	67	
Väinö Voionmaa	SDP	24 May 1947	78	
Vihtori Metsäranta	SKDL	20 November 1947	67	
Yrjö Räisänen	SKDL	18 June 1948	60	
Teuvo Valanne	National Coalition	10 July 1948	62	
Arvi Oksala	National Coalition	23 July 1949	58	
Jere Juutilainen	SDP	7 November 1949	60	
Lassi Hiekkala	Liberals	5 October 1951	62	
Paavo Leskinen	SKDL	5 March 1952	56	
Mauno Pekkala	SKDL	30 June 1952	62	
Mikko Järvinen	SKDL	30 April 1953	57	
Aino Luostarinen	Agrarian	3 July 1953	64	
Henrik Kullberg	RKP	4 December 1953	62	
Juho Emil Lampinen	Agrarian	14 May 1954	71	
Juho Niukkanen	Agrarian	17 May 1954	65	
Yrjö Kilpeläinen	SDP	30 January 1955	47	
Väinö Kaasalainen	Agrarian	14 April 1955	52	
Eero Saari	Agrarian	29 May 1955	47	
Lauri Murtomaa	Agrarian	29 July 1955	55	
Martti Huttunen	National Coalition	10 January 1956	44	
Penna Tervo	SDP	26 February 1956	54	Car crash
Juho Kuittinen	SDP	12 June 1956	66	
Arvi Ikonen	Agrarian	9 January 1957	44	
Heikki Soininen	Agrarian	19 April 1957	66	
Väinö Hakkila	SDP	18 July 1958	76	
Mauri Ryömä	SKDL	28 November 1958	47	Car crash
Toivo Kujala	SKDL	7 April 1959	54	
Johannes Wirtanen	National Coalition	24 November 1959	61	
Arthur Larson	RKP	21 October 1959	62	
Matti Miikki	Agrarian	9 July 1960	70	
Valdemar Liljeström	TPSL	11 November 1960	58	
Ralf Törngren	RKP	16 May 1961	62	
Aarre Marttila	Agrarian	5 October 1961	43	
Aino Malkamäki	TPSL	17 October 1961	66	
Yrjö Enne	SKDL	12 November 1961	62	
Pentti Niemi	SDP	7 February 1962	59	
Inkeri Virtanen	SKDL	29 June 1962	41	
Esa Hietanen	SKDL	15 October 1962	66	
Eeli Erkkilä	Agrarian	1 April 1963	53	
Markus Niskala	Agrarian	14 April 1963	72	
Väinö Kuoppala	National Coalition	2 September 1963	49	
Yrjö Murto	SKDL	17 December 1963	64	
Väinö Tikkaoja	SDP	30 January 1964	54	
Georg Eriksson	SDP	28 February 1964	63	
Olli Aulanko	National Coalition	30 April 1964	42	Heart attack
Janne Mustonen	SKDL	11 May 1964	63	
Jaakko Hakala	National Coalition	22 August 1964	51	
Kauno Kleemola	Agrarian	12 March 1965	58	
Marja Lahti	Centre	19 April 1967	65	
Olli J. Uoti	TPSL	13 May 1967	37	
Pekka Silander	SKDL	14 May 1968	43	
Uuno Takki	SDP	15 September 1968	67	
Olavi Lahtela	Centre	29 December 1968	53	Suffered a medical emergency and died while speaking at a parliamentary session
Lyyli Koskinen	SKDL	27 August 1969	50	
Toivo Antila	Centre	1 April 1970	59	
Antero Väyrynen	SDP	2 August 1970	53	
Juha Rihtniemi	National Coalition	12 January 1971	43	Pneumonia
Eero Laine	SDP	15 January 1971	40	
Eeli Lepistö	SDP	30 July 1973	46	
Tyyne Paasivuori	SDP	28 July 1974	66	
Juha Vikatmaa	National Coalition	2 December 1974	33	Suicide
Pentti Pekkarinen	Centre	20 January 1975	57	Car crash
Kalevi Huotari	Finnish People's Unity Party	8 March 1975	50	
Eero Salo	SDP	13 October 1975	54	
Evald Häggblom	RKP	29 August 1976	70	
Markku Salonen	National Coalition	11 March 1977	46	
Aarne Pulkkinen	SKDL	30 December 1977	62	
Kirsti Hollming	National Coalition	3 October 1978	45	Plane crash. She was not initially supposed to be on the flight.
Olavi Majlander	Christian League	3 October 1978	62	Plane crash
Arto Merisaari	SKDL	3 October 1978	38	Plane crash
Antero Salmenkivi	National Coalition	29 January 1979	47	
Eino Poutiainen	Rural Party	12 September 1979	61	
Salme Myyryläinen	SDP	13 September 1980	57	
Irma Rihtniemi-Koski	National Coalition	6 January 1981	54	
Tellervo M. Koivisto	SDP	6 March 1982	54	
Bror Lillqvist	SDP	2 February 1983	64	
Reijo Enävaara	Rural Party	6 August 1984	46	
Pentti Liedes	SKDL	6 August 1985	64	
Arvo Kemppainen	Left Alliance	22 February 1991	44	Heart attack
Väinö Saario	National Coalition	22 May 1996	53	Complications from surgery
Rainer Erlund	RKP	16 April 2000	60	Drowned in a boating accident
Jorma Vokkolainen	Left Alliance	27 January 2001	47	Medical emergency
Susanna Haapoja	Centre	30 May 2009	42	Cerebral hemorrhage
Tommy Tabermann	SDP	2 July 2010	62	Brain tumour
Antti Rantakangas	Centre	22 November 2019	55	Head injury from a fall at home
Ilkka Kanerva	National Coalition	14 April 2022	74	Prostate cancer
Eemeli Peltonen	SDP	19 August 2025	30	Suicide
