= 1918 in Finland =

- Decades: 1890s; 1900s; 1910s; 1920s; 1930s
- See also: Other events of 1918; Timeline of Finnish history

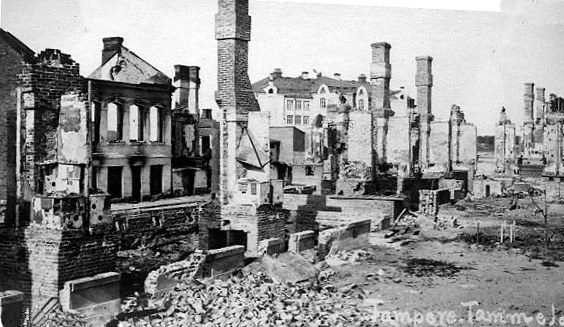
Tammela district of the City of Tampere after the Finnish Civil War in 1918

Events in the year 1918 in Finland.

== Incumbents ==
- Chairman of the Senate of Finland: Pehr Evind Svinhufvud (until May 27) (White side)
- Regent of Finland: Pehr Evind Svinhufvud (starting May 18), Gustaf Mannerheim (starting December 12) (White Side)
- Chairman of the Finnish People's Delegation: Kullervo Manner (until April 25) (Red Side)

== Events ==
Ongoing - Finnish Civil War

- 6 March – The Finnish Army Corps of Aviation, a forerunner of the Finnish Air Force, is founded. The blue swastika, Viking in origin, is adopted as its symbol, in tribute to the Swedish explorer and aviator Eric von Rosen, who donated the first plane.
- 15 March – Finnish Civil War: The Battle of Tampere begins, continuing until 6 April.
- 9 October – Prince Frederick Charles of Hesse is elected King of Finland.
- 14 December – Prince Frederick Charles of Hesse renounces the Finnish throne, without setting foot in the country.

== Deaths ==
- 31 January – Väinö Nyström, politician (executed) (b. 1857)
- 1 February – Antti Mikkola, politician (executed) (b. 1869)
- 2 March – Kalle Suosalo, politician (executed) (b. 1869)
- 29 March – Ernst Saari, politician (executed) (b. 1882)
- 6 April – Juho Lehmus, Finnish politician (executed) (b. 1858)
- 16 April – Kalle Vänniä, Finnish politician (executed) (b. 1874)
- 19 April – Paavo Aho, Olympic athlete (executed) (b. 1891)
- 20 April – Jussi Merinen, politician (executed) (b. 1873)
- 25 April – Juho Tulikoura, politician (executed) (b. 1862)
- 27 April
  - Leander Ikonen, architect and politician (executed) (b. 1860)
  - Matti Pietinen, politician (executed) (b. 1859)
- 1 May – August Vesa, politician (executed) (b. 1878)
- 3 May – Oskar Kaipio, politician (executed) (b. 1874)
- 6 May – Samuli Häkkinen, politician (executed) (b. 1857)
- 10 May – Jussi Rainio, politician (executed) (b. 1878)
- May
  - Juho Hakkinen, politician (executed) (b. 1872)
  - Vilho Lehokas, politician (executed) (b. 1876)
  - Juho Rikkonen, politician (executed) (b. 1874)

== See also ==
- History of Finland (1917–present)
- Timeline of Independence of Finland (1917–1920)
