= 1917 in Finland =

- Decades: 1890s; 1900s; 1910s; 1920s; 1930s
- See also: Other events of 1917; Timeline of Finnish history

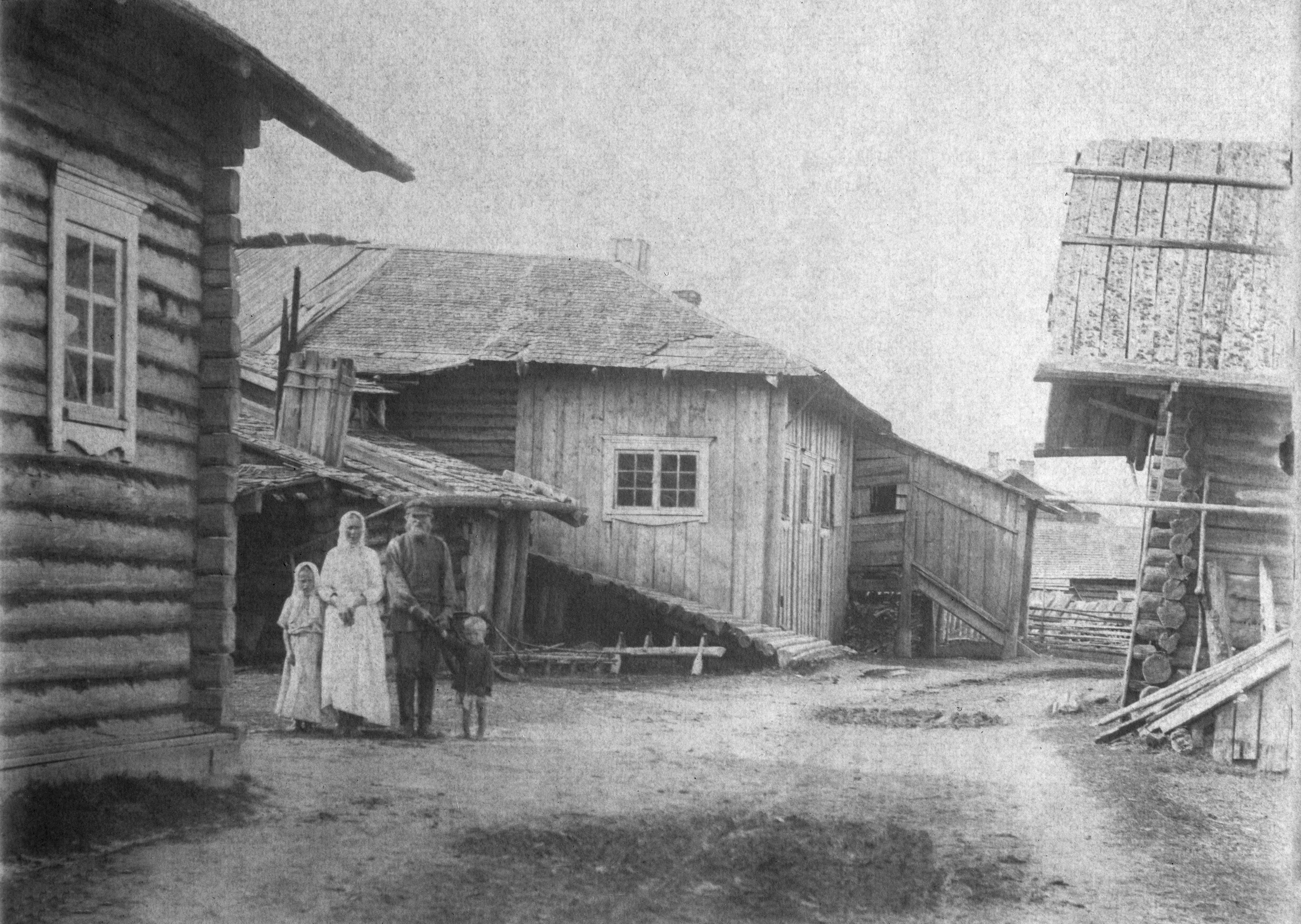

Events in the year 1917 in Finland.

== Incumbents ==
- Monarch: Nicholas II (until March 15)
- Governor-General of Finland: Franz Albert Seyn (until March 16), Mikhail Stakhovich until September 17), Nikolai Nekrasov (until November 7)
- Vice Chairman of the Economic Division: Mikhail Borovitinov (until March 15), Anders Wirenius (until March 26)
- Chairman of the Senate of Finland: Pehr Evind Svinhufvud (starting November 27)

== Establishments ==
- Confederation of Salaried Employees
- Finnish Musicians' Union
- Genealogical Society of Finland
- Helsingin Palloseura
- Hyvinkää
- Kerberos (magazine)
- League of Workers Association Youth
- White Guard (Finland)

== Events ==
- 16 March – Governor-General of Finland Franz Albert Seyn is removed from his office and arrested
- 19 March – Mikhail Aleksandrovich Stakhovich became the new Governor-General of Finland
- 26 March – Oskari Tokoi is appointed as the Chairmen of the Senate
- 18 July – Parliament of Finland accepts the Act of Rule of Law
- 31 July – Provisional government of Russia dissolves the Parliament of Finland
- 17 August – Oskari Tokoi resigns from the Senate, E.N. Setälä takes his place
- 17 September – Nikolai Nekrasov become the new Governor-General of Finland
- 1–2 October – 1917 Finnish parliamentary election
- 27 November – Pehr Evind Svinhufvud is appointed as Chairman of the Senate, becoming the first Prime Minister of Finland.
- 4 December – Svinhufvud senate declares Independence of Finland
- 6 December – Finnish Declaration of Independence: Finland declares its independence from the Russian Empire following the Bolsheviks taking power.
- 31 December –
  - Soviet government recognizes the Independence of Finland
  - Åland declares itself as part of Sweden

== See also ==
- History of Finland (1917–present)
- Timeline of Independence of Finland (1917–1920)
