= Blue-and-Blacks =

Former far-right political organization in Finland

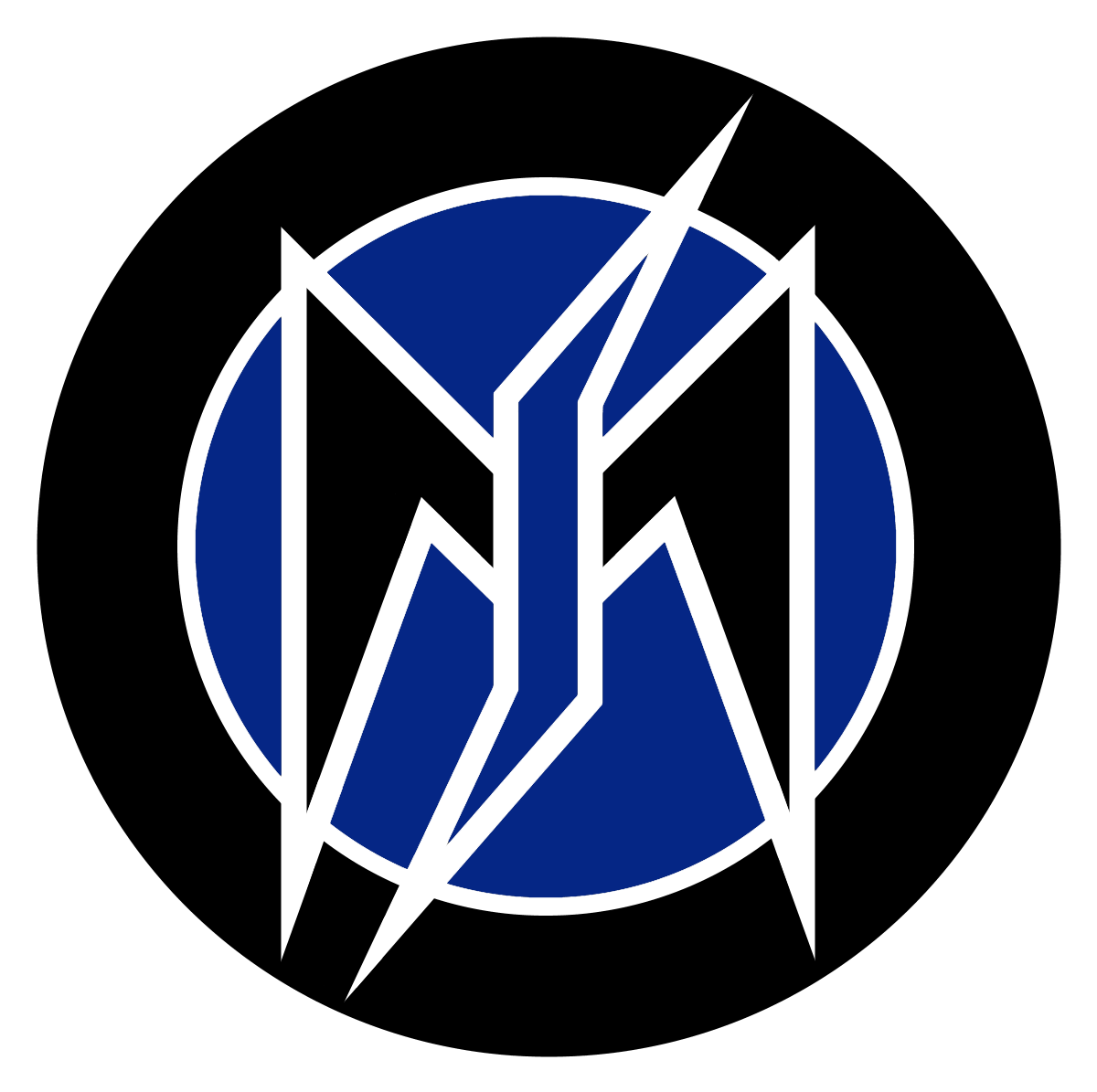
The logo of Sinimustat

The Blue-and-Blacks (Sinimustat) was a fascist youth organization that operated in Finland from 1930 to 1936, initially affiliated with the Lapua Movement and then the Patriotic People's Movement (IKL).

== History ==
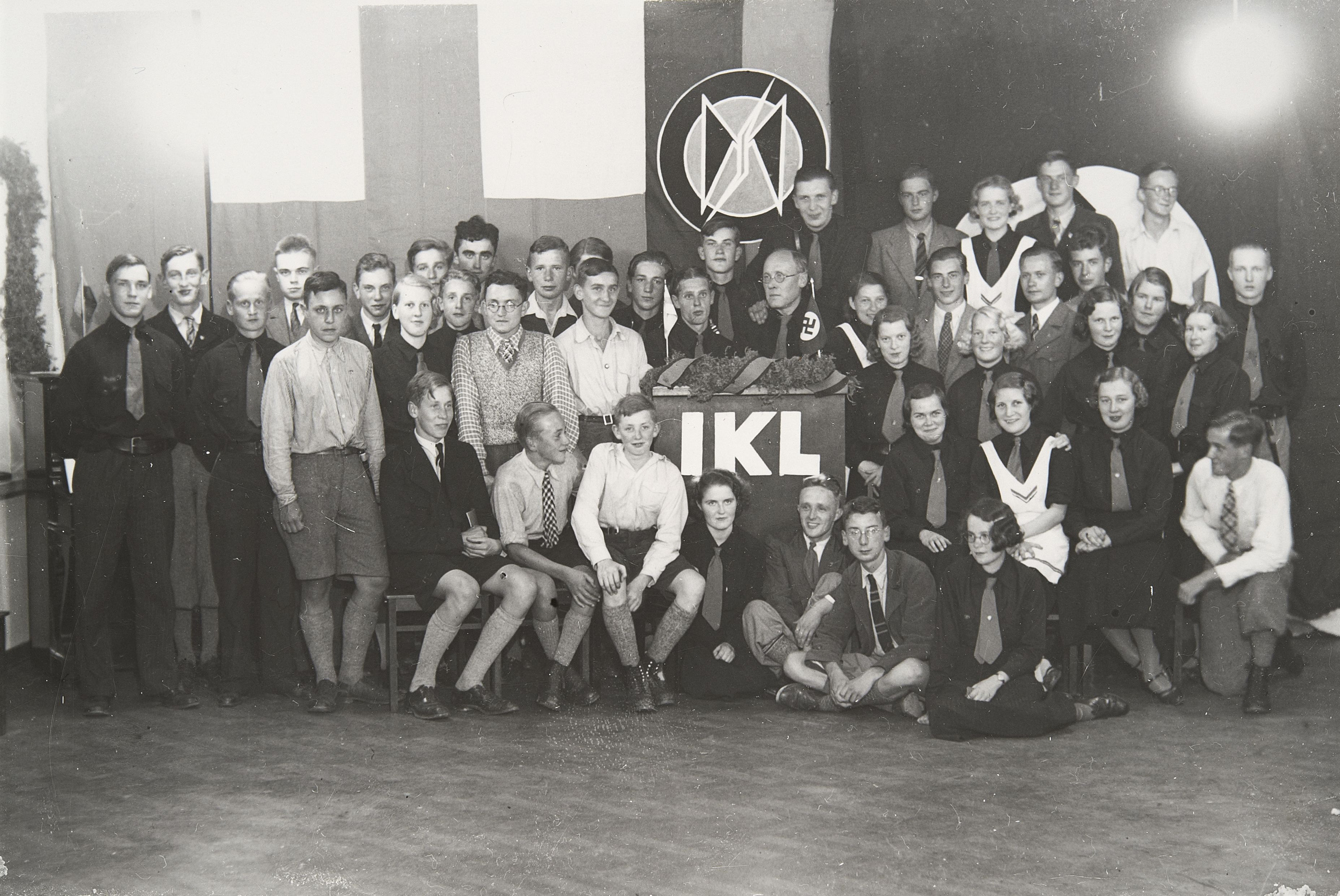
Hitler-Jugend as a guest of the Blue-and-Blacks in Finland on August 7, 1934.

The Blue-and-Blacks was founded in the winter of 1930–1931, when the students of Lapua Co-educational School founded the Blue-and-Blacks Club in their school, inspired by the ideas of the Lapua Movement. Its first chairman was Aulis Ojajärvi and its secretary was Jouko Sinisalo. The Blue-and-Blacks serve as the youth organization of the Lapua Movement. The organization had no contacts with the student unions and did not take a position on the language issue.

The Lapua Movement. ceased operations in the winter of 1932 and the need for a youth organization was soon recognized in IKL, and a ready-made organization for it existed. In January 1933, Blue-and-Blacks became affiliated with the IKL. At that time, the central management of the organization moved to Helsinki and was headed by Pastor Elias Simojoki.

The Blue-and-Blacks and IKL had no official relationship. However, the local director of IKL had to be consulted when electing the head of the local Blue-and-Blacks chapter, and both organizations were headed by the same people, incl. two IKL MPs, Simojoki and Reino Ala-Kulju.

According to the rules of the fall of 1933, the Blue-and-Blacks could be joined by any girl or boy who turned 10 years old. All Blue-and-Blacks wore a uniform organizational suit, a black blouse, and a blue tie. The blacks also used the Roman salute. Every 17-year-old Blue-and-Blacks could join IKL's local branch. The purpose of the organization was to create Greater Finland. In order to achieve this, measures had to be taken to awaken and strengthen the patriotic and Finnish national spirit among Finnish youth. The ideology was especially influenced by the Academic Karelia Society. According to the fascist Ajan Suunta magazine: "Greater Finland, whose border is far away and the people strong - that is the brave goal of the Blue-and-Blacks." In all their activities, the Blue-and-Blacks had to observe Christian moral discipline and order.

Each Blue-and-black was strictly ordered to join the White Guard or its boys organisation to practice military discipline. The young people were also ordered to become familiar with march music and ideological literature. Compulsory marching songs had to be learned like "Luo Lippujen" before taking the oath. Recommended literature included the poetry of Aarno Karimo, the works of Sulo-Veikko Pekkola, the historical research of J. O. Hannula, the military memoirs of Paavo Talvela and biographies of Mussolini and Horst Wessel.

The new youth organization immediately gained great popularity among school youth. There were seventy Blue-and-Blacks chapters in operation in 1935. There were about 5,500 members who took the oath, but according to Simojoki, its ideas were supported by tens of thousands of young people. The school board, for its part, banned organization uniforms even before the school began in the fall of 1933.

== Organizational culture ==
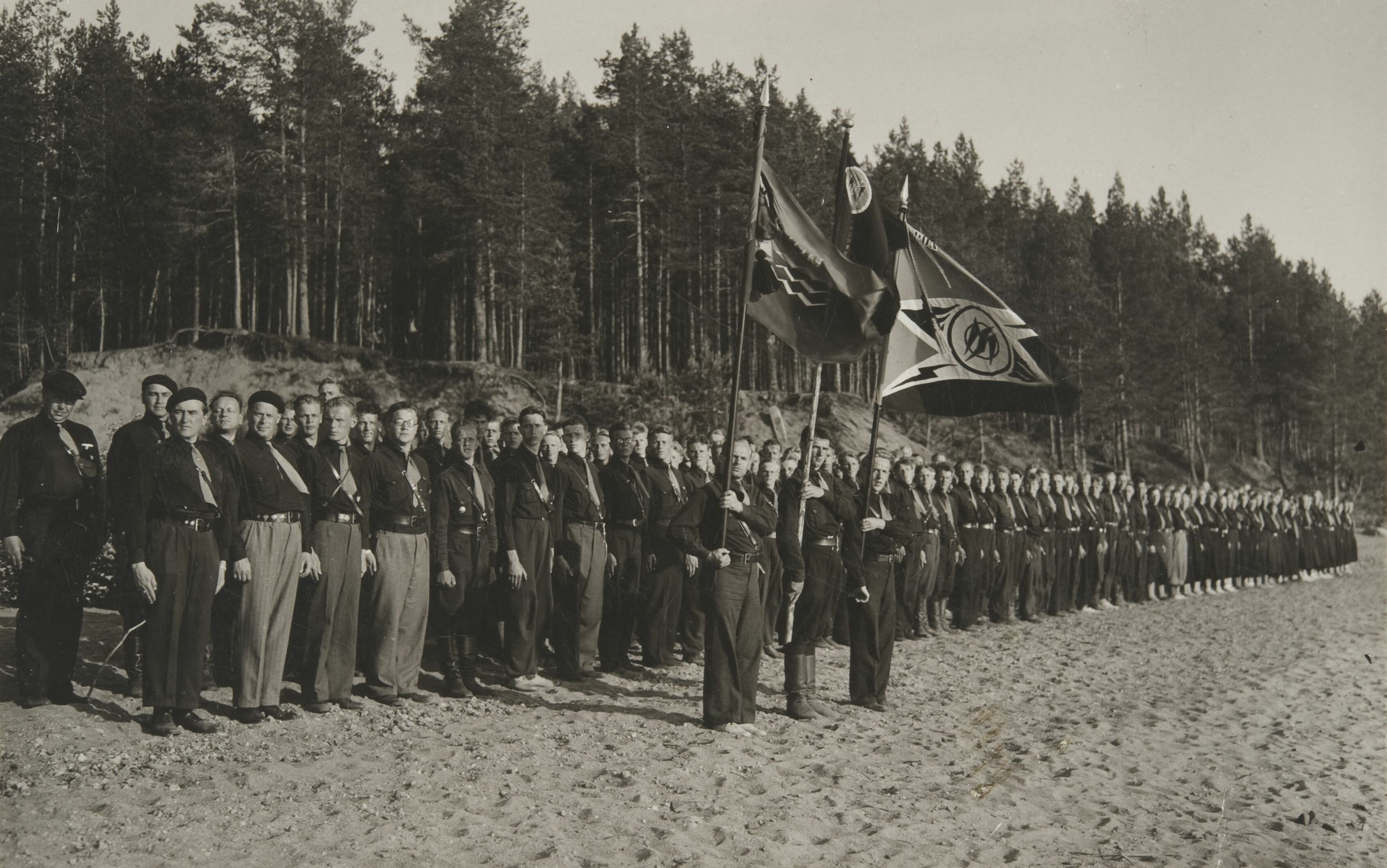
At Kuortane camp in 1935.

The Blue-and-Blacks spirit was created by large summer camps held in 1933 in Vanaja and in 1934 and 1935 in Kuortane. Participants slept in military tents, sang, swam, listened to presentations and discussed. The Blue-and-Blacks camps were also met with fierce resistance. Ilkka of the Agrarian League wrote that the Blue-and-Blacks camps trained to take part in armed struggle: "for a certain party's ultimate plan for power". In 1934, Blue-and-Blacks magazine was founded as the organ of the Blue-and-Blacks organization. The Blue-and-Blacks also had high-level cultural activities, including the Blue-and-Blacks recitation choir, the best known of which was the one led by Pekka Kuusi known as "Echo of Merja". Cultural relations were maintained, especially with the German Hitler-Jugend. The Blue-and-Blacks took influences from other youth organizations both at home and abroad, such as the German Nazis and Italian fascists.

Members of the organization often behaved fanatically, even in legal gray area. In 1935, the Blue-and-Blacks detonated a homemade tear gas bomb at Vallila's workers' house, and in July the peace meeting in Balder Hall was disrupted by throwing a stink bomb at the audience. In 1935, Blue-and-Blacks took part in street battles against "Hurris" on Swedish Day.

== Abolition ==
The doom of the organisation was getting tangled in the power struggle in Estonia. The Finns - including Simojoki - helped Artur Sirk, the leader of the Estonian freedom fighter movement, Vaps, who had been sentenced to prison, to escape. Sirk received a residence permit in Finland and was assigned to Lohja. There he was visited by several people close to the Blue-and-Blacks movement. The idea arose to oust the President of Estonia Konstantin Päts. Funds were sought from Estonia to acquire weapons for the Vaps. The coup was to take place in early December 1935. However, the plan dried up when the Estonian authorities got a hint of the plan and arrested the planners on 8 December. At the same time, material was found that proved that the Blue-and-Blacks were involved in the plan. In home searches near Simojoki, the so-called Heinäsaari letter to Jaakko Virkkunen, in which Simojoki talked about sending the Minister of Justice, "“Sasu”, “Eero” and other reptiles to a concentration camp in Heinäsaari in Petsamo". On January 23, 1936, the Ministry of the Interior banned the activities of the Blue-and-Blacks.

== After the ban ==
The activities of the blacks were resumed immediately under a new name. IKL's new youth organisation was the "Blackshirts", which published its own magazine "Luo Lippujen", edited by Viljo Lius. The same people came to lead the organization as before: Simojoki, Reino Ala-Kulju, Anna-Liisa Heikinheimo, etc. However, the Academic Karelia Society was announced as the organizer of the summer camp activities. In the summer of 1938, blackshirt camps were already held in six locations. Blackshirts continued to operate until 1939. At that time, no more summer camps were organized, but all the grown-up black shirts were in fortification work on the Isthmus organized by AKS.
