= 1919 in Finland =

- Decades: 1890s; 1900s; 1910s; 1920s; 1930s
- See also: Other events of 1919; Timeline of Finnish history

Events in the year 1919 in Finland.

== Incumbents ==
- Regent: Gustaf Mannerheim (until July 26)
- President of Finland: Kaarlo Juho Ståhlberg (starting July 26)
- Prime Minister of Finland: Lauri Ingman (until April 17), Kaarlo Castrén (until August 15), Juho Vennola

== Events ==
- 1-3 March – The 1919 Finnish parliamentary election takes place, ending in victory for the Social Democratic Party.
- 17 April
  - Lauri Ingman ends his first term as Prime Minister of Finland.
  - The Cabinet of new prime minister Kaarlo Castrén begins a period of minority government, lasting only until 15 August.
- 25 July – Kaarlo Juho Ståhlberg is elected President of Finland by the country's Parliament.
- 25 July – The Cabinet of new prime minister Juho Vennola begins a period of minority government.

== Births ==
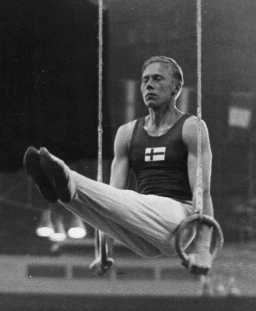
Veikko Huhtanen

- 5 June – Veikko Huhtanen, artistic gymnast (d. 1976)

== Deaths ==
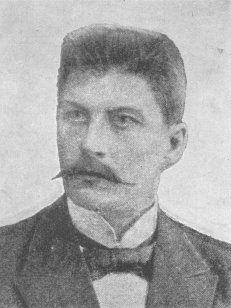
Eetu Salin

- 25 February – Oskari Suutala, politician (b. 1887)
- 6 April – Eetu Salin, politician (b. 1866)
- 15 April – Jukka Lankila, politician (b. 1881)
- 1 July
  - Jussi Kujala, politician (b. 1878)
  - Taavetti Lapveteläinen, politician (b. 1860)

== See also ==
- History of Finland#Finland in the inter-war era
- History of Finland (1917–present)
- Timeline of Independence of Finland (1917–1920)
