= Kilpeläinen =

Kilpeläinen is a Finnish surname. Notable people with the surname include:

- Edvard Kilpeläinen (1879–1941), Finnish Lutheran clergyman and politician
- Viljo Kilpeläinen (1906–1937), Finnish industrial worker and politician
- Yrjö Kilpeläinen (1907–1955), Finnish journalist, educationist and politician
- Tuure Kilpeläinen (born 1970), Finnish musician and singer-songwriter
- Eero Kilpeläinen (born 1985), Finnish ice hockey player
