= Tulikoura =

Tulikoura is a surname. Notable people with the surname include:

- Juho Tulikoura (1862–1918), Finnish farmer
- Toimi Tulikoura (1905–1983), Finnish athlete
