= Antti Halonen =

Antti Halonen may refer to:

- Antti Halonen (ice hockey)
- Antti Halonen (politician)
