= Juho Vaarala =

Finnish farmer and politician (1864–1926)

Juho Erkki Vaarala (30 September 1864 – 29 November 1926; original surname Lämsä) was a Finnish farmer and politician, born in Kuusamo. He was a member of the Parliament of Finland from 1907 to 1917, representing the Finnish Party.
