= Flotilla =

Formation of small ships that may be part of a larger fleet

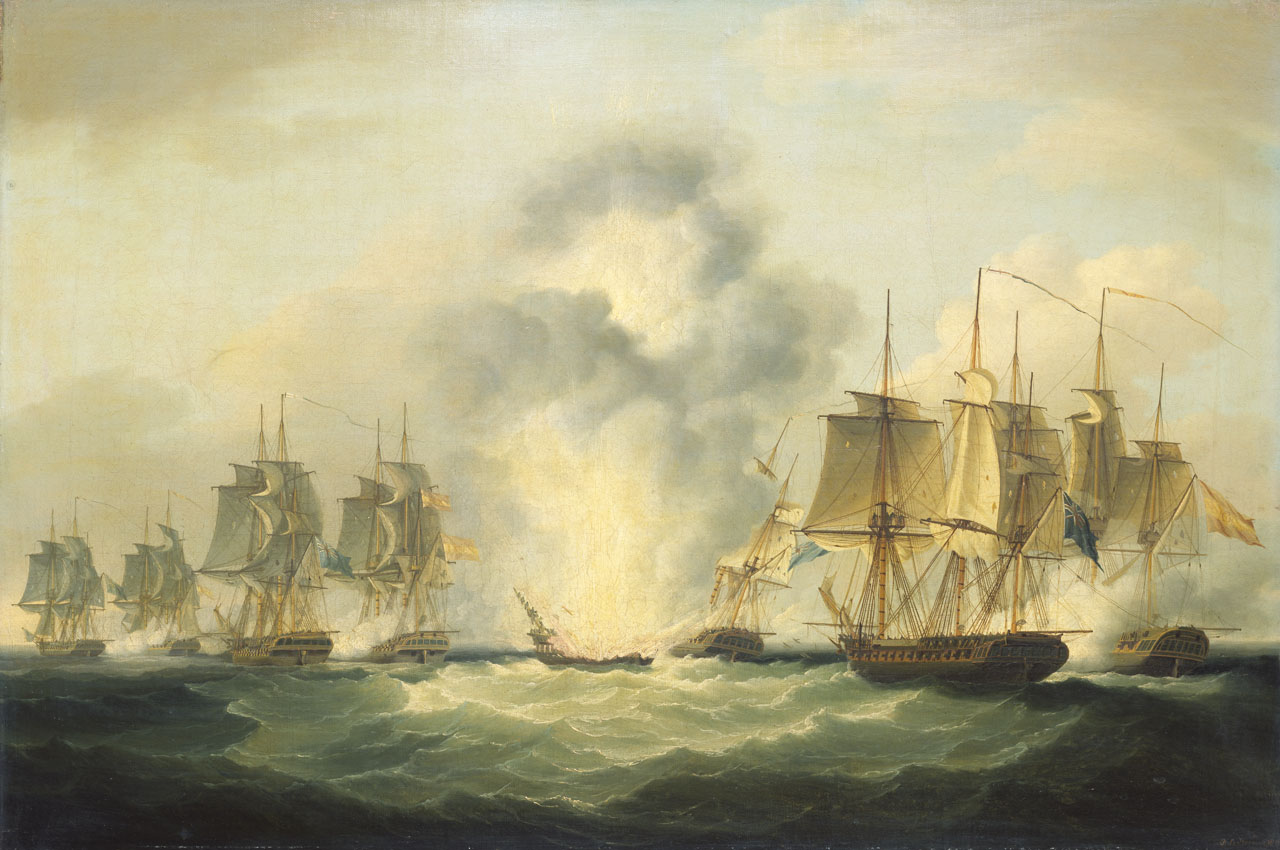
A Spanish flotilla being engaged by the Royal Navy in the action of 5 October 1804

A flotilla (from Spanish, meaning a small flota (fleet) of ships), or naval flotilla, is a formation of small ships that may be part of a larger fleet.

== Composition ==
A flotilla is usually composed of a homogeneous group of the same class of warship, such as frigates, destroyers, torpedo boats, submarines, gunboats, or minesweepers. Groups of larger warships are usually called squadrons, but similar units of non-capital ships may be called squadrons in some instances, and flotillas in others. Formations including more than one capital ship, e.g. men-of-war, battleships, and aircraft carriers, typically alongside smaller ships and support craft, are typically called fleets, each portion led by a capital ship being a squadron or task force.

A flotilla is usually commanded by a rear admiral, a commodore or a captain, depending on the importance of the command (a vice admiral would normally command a squadron). A flotilla is often divided into two or more divisions, each of which might be commanded by the most senior commander, nearly always a lieutenant at the very least. A flotilla is often, but not necessarily, a permanent formation.

In modern navies, flotillas have tended to become administrative units containing several squadrons. As warships have grown larger, the term squadron has gradually replaced the term flotilla for formations of destroyers, frigates and submarines in many navies.

A naval flotilla has no direct equivalent on land, but is, perhaps, the rough equivalent in tactical value of a brigade or regiment.

== Specific usage ==
=== United States Coast Guard Auxiliary ===
In the United States Coast Guard Auxiliary, a flotilla is the basic organizational unit and consists of members at a local level where the majority of the work of the auxiliary is done. A flotilla is led by an elected flotilla commander assisted by an elected vice flotilla commander, who is in turn assisted by appointed flotilla staff officers. A Coast Guard Auxiliary division consists of multiple flotillas and a district consists of multiple divisions. Auxiliary districts are organized along Coast Guard district lines and are administered by a Coast Guard officer (usually a commander or captain) who is called the "director of the auxiliary".

=== Russian and Soviet navies ===
In the Imperial Russian Navy, Soviet Navy, and Russian Federation Navy, the word flotilla (флотилия, flotilliya) has tended to be used for "brown-water" naval units – those operating not on the oceans and real seas, but on inland seas or rivers. Among the former are the present-day Caspian Flotilla, the early-20th-century Satakundskaya Flotilla, or the Aral Flotilla of the 1850s; among the latter, the Don Military Flotilla (which was created several times over more than 200 years), the Dnieper Flotilla (also extant in the 18th and 20th centuries), the Red Volga Flotilla, which participated in the Kazan Operation during the Russian Civil War, and the Danube Flotilla. In the 18th century, the term also applied to the comparatively small fleets operating on those seas where Russia did not have much naval presence yet, e.g. the Okhotsk Flotilla.

=== Non-military usage ===
The word flotilla has also been used at times to refer to a small fleet of vessels, commercial or otherwise. There is also such a thing as a "flotilla holiday", which is a group of chartered yachts that set sail together on the same route. Also outside of a military context, the Center for International Maritime Security, an open-membership Naval Strategy think tank based in the United States, maintains a similar use of the word Flotilla to that of the United States Coast Guard Auxiliary. In this context, Flotilla refers to a specialized sub-group of individuals within the broader organization, such as the Center's Warfighting Flotilla.

== See also ==
- 10th Assault Vehicle Flotilla
- Chesapeake Bay Flotilla of U.S. Navy (War of 1812)
- Tactical formation
- Flotilla admiral
- Gaza Freedom Flotilla
