= Johan Richard Danielson-Kalmari =

Finnish historian and politician (1853–1933)

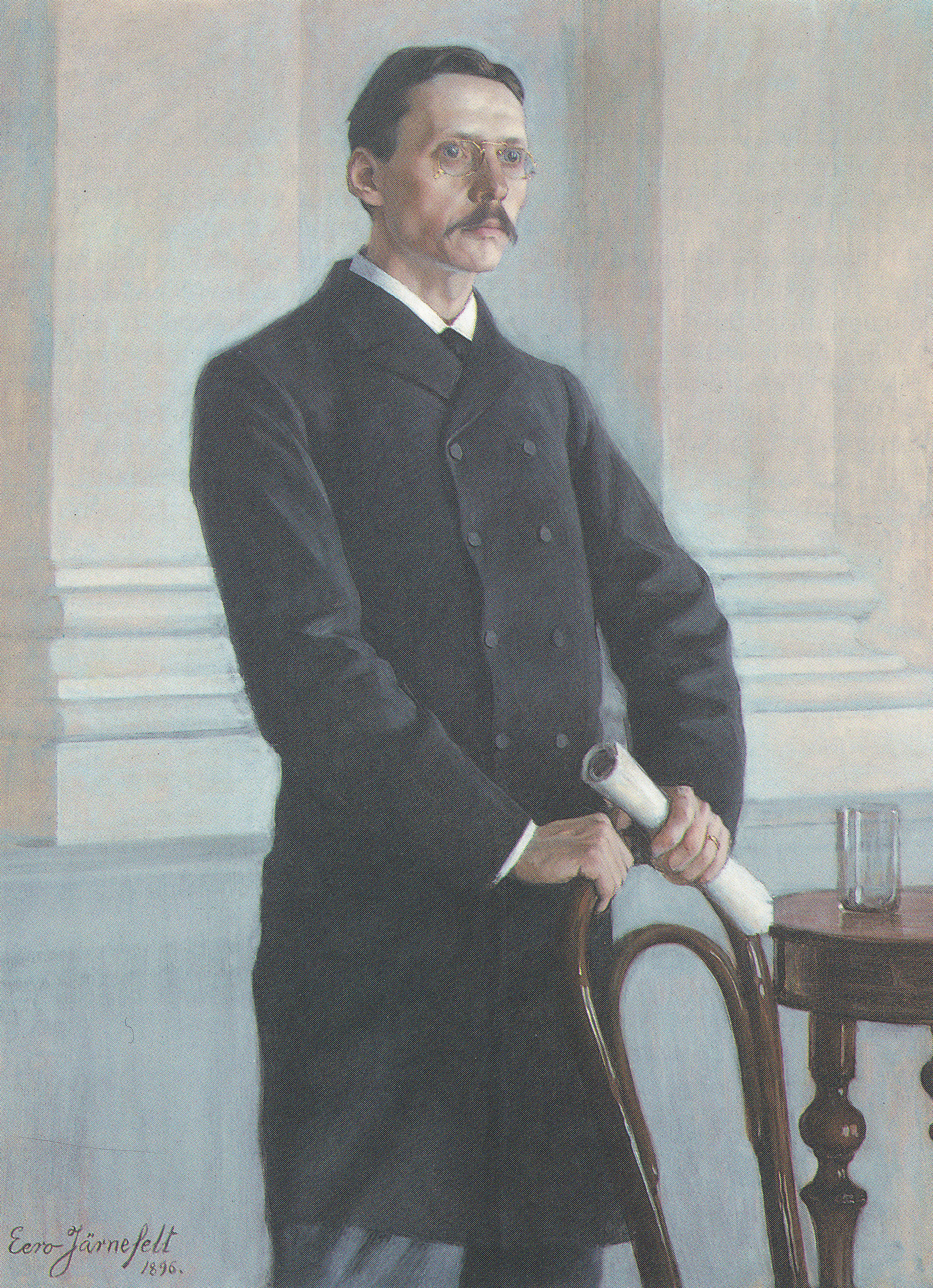
- J. R. Danielson in 1896, portrait by Eero Järnefelt
- Born: Johan Richard Danielson; 7 May 1853; Hauho, Grand Duchy of Finland
- Died: 23 May 1933 (aged 80); Helsinki, Finland
- Occupations: Historian, politician
- Spouse: Jenny Mathilda Heurlin (m. 1878)
- Parent(s): Johan Filip Danielson; Amanda Lovisa Palander

Johan Richard Danielson-Kalmari (until 1906 Danielson; 7 May 1853 – 23 May 1933) was a Finnish historian and politician. He was professor of general history at the Imperial Alexander University in Helsinki from 1880 and the university's Deputy Chancellor from 1903 to 1906; he later served as Chancellor of the University of Turku from 1921 to 1926.

As a member of the Diet of Finland and later of the Parliament of Finland from 1882 to 1916, Danielson-Kalmari was one of the leading figures of the Finnish Party (the "Old Finns") and, after the death of Yrjö-Koskinen in 1903, its leader. He was a central proponent of the so-called "compliance line" during the Russification periods, which sought a pragmatic accommodation with the Russian imperial government in order to preserve Finland's autonomy. He served as Senator without portfolio in the Hjelt Senate in 1908–1909.

== Background and education ==
Danielson was the son of chaplain Johan Filip Danielson and Amanda Lovisa Palander. He received his Abitur in 1870, gained his undergraduate degree in 1876, Licenciate in 1878 and his Ph.D. in 1881 from the Imperial Alexander University in Helsinki. At the university he first studied Greek and Roman literature but soon turned to history.

In 1876–1877 Danielson made a study trip to Germany, where he was influenced by, among others, the historian Johann Gustav Droysen and the economists Adolph Wagner and Gustav Schmoller. The conservative social reformism of Wagner and Schmoller — derided by opponents as "Kathedersozialismus" or "socialism of the chair", which sought to improve the conditions of the working class without abandoning older social values — shaped not only Danielson's philosophy of history but also his political and social outlook. He married Jenny Mathilda Heurlin in 1878.

On 12 May 1906, Snellman Day, Danielson changed his surname to Danielson-Kalmari as part of the mass Finnicisation of surnames in Finland.

== Academic career ==
Danielson was a Docent of General History from 1878 and a professor from 1880 to 1913. His appointment to the chair followed a hard-fought contest with the Swedish-speaking candidate Magnus Gottfrid Schybergson; Swedish-language opinion held that the decision had been made on language-political grounds, and a scholarly polemic between the two continued for years. He served as Deputy Chancellor of the Imperial Alexander University from 1903 to 1906 and later as Chancellor of the University of Turku from 1921 to 1926.

Alongside his academic positions, Danielson worked as editor-in-chief of the periodical Valvoja from 1881 to 1884. He had founded the periodical in 1881 together with E. G. Palmén, Volmari Porkka, Oskar Emil Tudeer and Valfrid Vasenius; it became a platform for a more moderate and socially engaged form of the Fennoman (Finnish-nationalist) programme than that of the older generation, and the circle around it saw itself as an intellectual middle generation that "humanised Fennomania".

Danielson-Kalmari's scholarly work was important for the development of the idea of a "Finnish nation-state" as the precondition for Finland's successful evolution into an independent state. Inspired by Karl Lamprecht, he formulated the doctrine that independence had been the overarching goal toward which Finnish history had always been striving and that the historian's task was to chart this path — an organic view later known in Finnish historiography as viewing history through "the keyhole of 6 December", referring to Finland's independence day.

== Political career ==
At the Diet of 1882 Danielson served as secretary of the general education committee. From 1885 he sat in the Diet himself as a member of the clergy estate, taking part in the sessions of 1885, 1888, 1891, 1894, 1897, 1899, 1900, 1904 and 1905. He represented the Finnish Party in the Parliament from 1907 to 1916.

In the constitutional conflicts with Russia, Danielson-Kalmari initially took a stance opposed to tsarist reaction but later sought to mediate between competing positions. In his pamphlet Mihin suuntaan? ("In which direction?", 1901) he argued that officials had no authority to assess the legality of decrees issued from the highest level. This placed him among the so-called "compliance men" (myöntyvyysmiehet), who held that Finland should make concessions on matters not considered essential in order to preserve the relationship with the emperor, and whose principal spokesman was Yrjö-Koskinen. After Yrjö-Koskinen's death in 1903, Danielson-Kalmari became leader of the Finnish Party.

In 1904 he was appointed to the so-called Tagantsev Committee, a Russo-Finnish body addressing the strained constitutional relationship between the Grand Duchy of Finland and the Russian Empire. He advocated an agreement that would clearly delimit the boundary between matters of imperial legislation and those reserved for Finland's own legislation. He was a Senator without portfolio in the Hjelt Senate from 1 August 1908 to 13 November 1909; the senate resigned in the spring of 1909 after the senators refused to publish one of the emperor's interpretations of the law.

At the party congress of 1917, Danielson-Kalmari opposed the push for full independence, warning against demanding too much; he held that Finland was an "inseparable part" of the Russian Empire and should act loyally, although he favoured an expansion of autonomy. After the Bolshevik seizure of power in Petrograd, however, he concluded that the only option was separation from Russia. In 1918 he was pro-German and a monarchist, regarding a monarchy as the best safeguard for Finnish independence against the Russian threat and against any further revolutionary attempts.

Danielson-Kalmari's ideas enjoyed an unexpected renaissance after the Continuation War, when President J. K. Paasikivi saw himself as continuing the line of the Old Finns at the beginning of the century — the line of relative concession — albeit under far more difficult conditions.

== Personal life and legacy ==
Danielson bought a villa called Suviniemi in Vääksy, Asikkala, in 1892 and spent his summers there until his death. The municipality of Asikkala bought the villa from Danielson-Kalmari's heirs in 1986. Today, the restored Suviniemi is a historic house museum maintained by the municipality. A monument to Danielson-Kalmari stands in Lahti. He is buried at Hietaniemi Cemetery in Helsinki.

== Publications ==
- Voltaire Kaarle XII:nen historian kirjoittajana (1878)
- Zur Geschichte der sächsischen Politik 1706-1709 (1878)
- Bidrag till en framställning af Englands socialpolitik och ekonomisk-sociala utveckling under XIII-XVI århundradet (1880)
- Die nordische Frage in den Jahren 1746-1751 (1888)
- Suomen yhdistäminen Venäjän valtakuntaan (1890)
- Suomen sisällinen itsenäisyys (1892)
- Viipurin läänin palauttaminen muun Suomen yhteyteen (1894)
- Suomen sota ja sotilaat vuosina 1808 ja 1809 (1896)
- Finska kriget och Finlands krigare 1808-1809 (1897)
- Mihin suuntaan? (1901)
- Suomen sota vv. 1808-1809 (1908)
- Juhana Vilhelm Snellman (1911)
- Åbo Morgonblad'in lakkauttaminen (1914)
- Ahvenanmaan asia vv. 1914-1920 (1920)
- Suomen valtio- ja yhteiskuntaelämää 18:nnella ja 19:nnellä vuosisadalla (1920-33)
- Tien varrelta kansalliseen ja valtiolliseen itsenäisyyteen (1928-31)
