= Satakundskaya Flotilla =

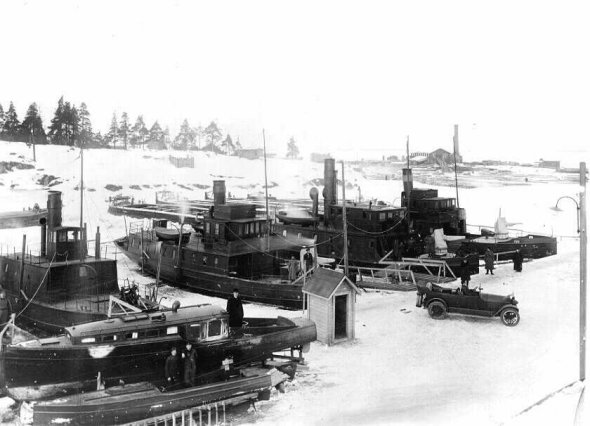
- The Satakunta Flotilla wintering over in Mustalahti Harbor, Tampere, 1917.
- Active: 1916–1917
- Country: Russian Empire
- Branch: Imperial Russian Navy
- Type: Gunboat unit
- Role: Brown water warfare
- Size: Three converted passenger ships, two tugs and a number of requisitioned motorboats. Crewed by 100+ matrose.
- Garrison/HQ: Mustalahti
- Engagements: World War I: Finnish Civil War

Commanders
- Notable commanders: Captain of 2nd rank Sablin

The Satakundskaya Flotilla (Russian: Сатакундская флотилия, romanized: Satakundskaya flotilla) was a brown-water navy unit of the Imperial Russian Navy, operating on Lake Näsijärvi, Finland, during the First World War from spring 1916 until winter 1917. In Finnish sources, the unit is often called Satakunta Fleet (Finnish: Satakunnan laivasto). The name of the unit derives from Satakunta, the historical province where Lake Näsijärvi was located at the time, but the Finnish version is likely a mistranslation of flotilla.

== Operational history ==
The flotilla was founded during spring 1916, as the Russian military commissioned the Finnish passenger ships Tarjanne, Kuru and Pohjola and the tugs Murole and Näsijärvi. In addition, civilian motorboats were requisitioned for military use. The ships were crewed by their original Finnish crew, commanded by their Finnish masters subordinated to a Russian officer. The passenger ships were armed with 75 millimetres (3.0 in) naval guns, crewed by Russian matrose. The flotilla was commanded by Captain of 2nd rank Sablin, who used the Tarjanne as his flagship. The Russian contingent of the flotilla numbered circa 100 men, housed in a storage building at Mustalahti harbor.

During its existence, the flotilla carried out no combat actions and never fired its main armament. The passenger ships were not designed to act as gun platforms and their structures would likely have suffered had the guns been used. Instead, during the navigation season of 1916, the flotilla practiced troop transports on Näsijärvi. In the event of a German invasion of Finland, the Satakunta flotilla would probably have been able to prevent the Germans from using Näsijärvi and been able to supply and transport army units in the area of this 100 km-long waterway. On the other hand, the flotilla was confined to Lake Näsijärvi, as Tammerkoski prevents all navigation downstream.

== Disbandment and aftermath ==
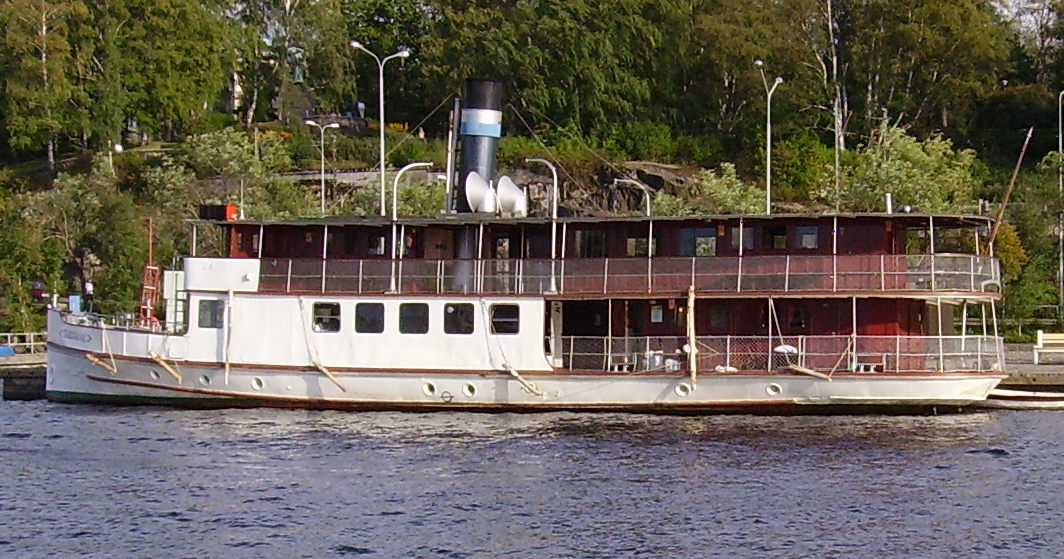
Tarjanne in 2006

During the spring 1917, the flotilla was paralyzed, as the February Revolution negated the discipline of the Imperial Russian Army and Fleet. At the same time, the wages of the Finnish crewmembers were suspended, resulting in their leaving the flotilla. During the navigation season of 1917, the flotilla carried out no activities worth mentioning, and its Russian members moved out of Tampere in October 1917. The naval guns rigged on the passenger ships were left behind, and they saw action in the Finnish Civil War three months later. During the winter and spring of 1918, they were first used by the Red Guards, then after the Battle of Tampere, by the White Guard.

After the Civil War, the ships returned to civilian passenger service on Lake Näsijärvi. In 1929, the Kuru sank in a storm, resulting in the loss of 138 lives. Of the three ships, the Tarjanne is still in passenger service.

== See also ==
- Eastern Front (World War I)
- Russification
- Finnish Civil War
- Tampere
