= Kalle Vänniä =

Finnish farmer and politician (1874–1918)

Karl Thomas (Kalle Tuomas) Vänniä (16 October 1874 – 16 April 1918) was a Finnish farmer and politician, born in Tyrvää. He was a member of the Parliament of Finland from 1914 to 1917, representing the Finnish Party. During the Finnish Civil War, Vänniä was arrested on 7 April 1918 by Red Guards as a prominent representative of the White side and summarily executed on 16 April 1918.
