= Justus Ripatti =

Finnish farmer and politician (1863–1912)

Justus Ripatti (8 August 1863 – 16 January 1912) was a Finnish farmer and politician, born in Hirvensalmi. He was a member of the Parliament of Finland from 1907 to 1908 and from 1910 until his death in 1912, representing the Finnish Party.
