= Leander Ikonen =

Finnish politician and architect

Karl Leander Ikonen (14 October 1860 – 27 April 1918) was a Finnish architect and politician. He was a member of the Parliament of Finland from 1916 to 1917, representing the Finnish Party. He was also the chairman of the far-right Citizens' Association of Karelia. Ikonen was born in Joroinen. In 1918, during the Finnish Civil War, being a prominent supporter of the White side, he was arrested by Red Guards and shot in Viipuri on 27 April 1918, as White troops were preparing to storm the city.
