= Matti Puittinen =

Finnish construction worker and politician (1883–1937)

Matti Sanfrid (Samfred) Puittinen (5 December 1883 – 30 January 1937) was a Finnish construction worker and politician, born in Pielisjärvi. He was a member of the Parliament of Finland from 1919 until his death in 1937, representing the Social Democratic Party of Finland (SDP). He was a presidential elector in the 1925 and 1931 presidential elections.
