= Alex Alfthan =

Karl Gustaf Alexander Alfthan (17 November 1865 – 3 July 1922) was a Finnish farmer, bank director and politician, born in Hausjärvi. He was a member of the Parliament of Finland in 1922, representing the National Coalition Party.
