= Juho Lallukka =

Finnish businessman (1852–1913)

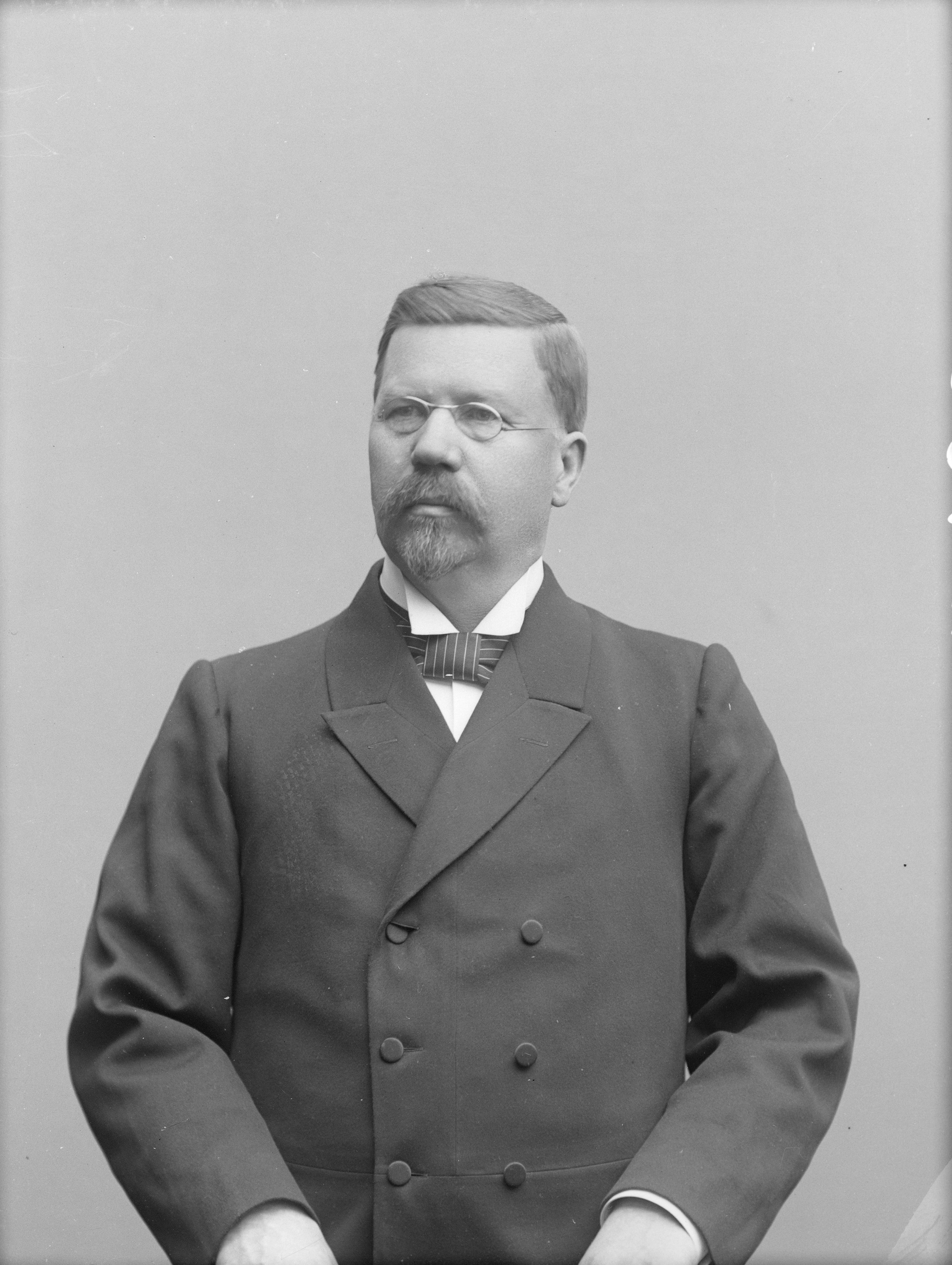
Juho Lallukka

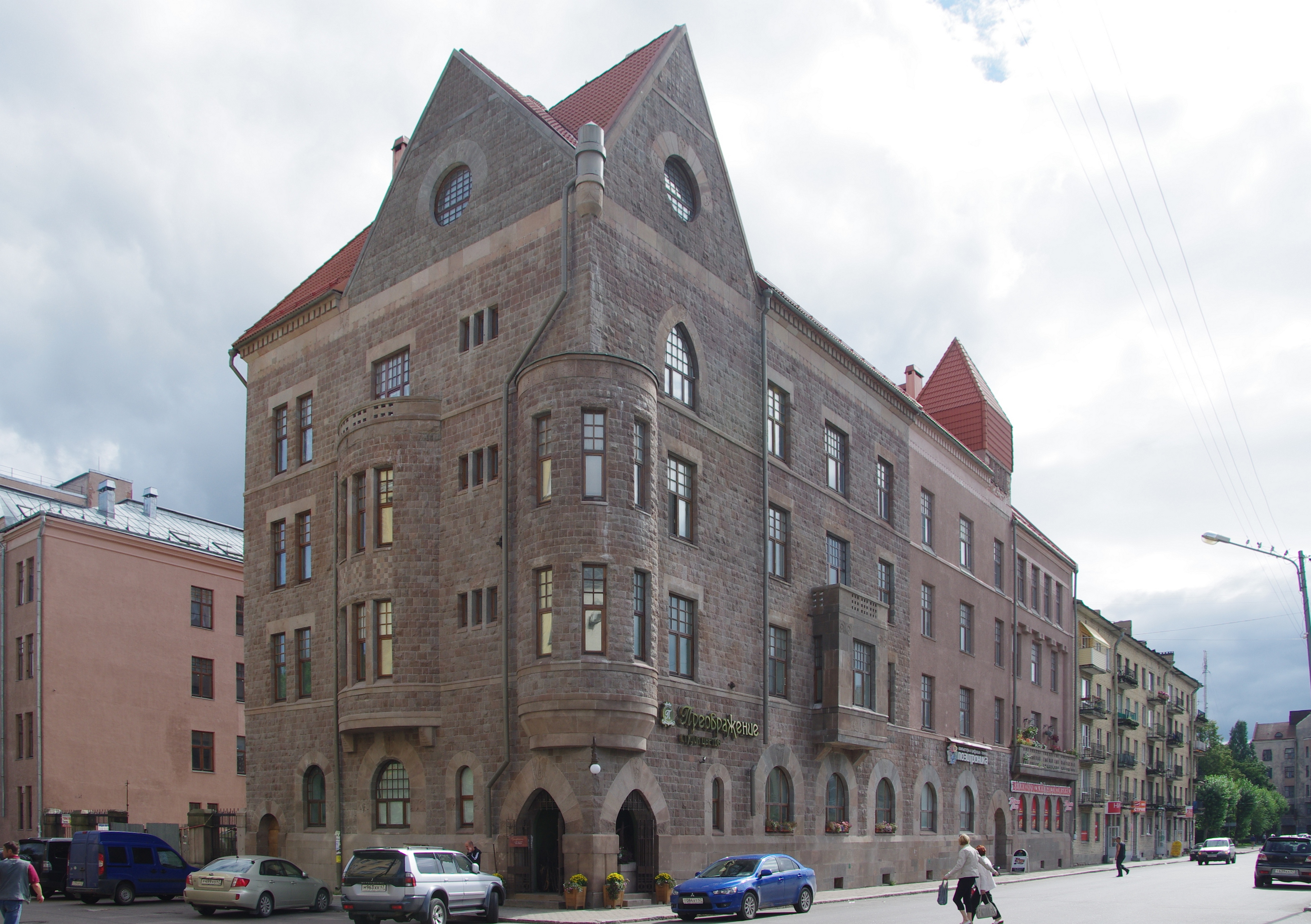
Lallukka's Building at the corner of Vokzalnaya Street and Mayakovskogo Street (formerly Lallukka Street) in Vyborg

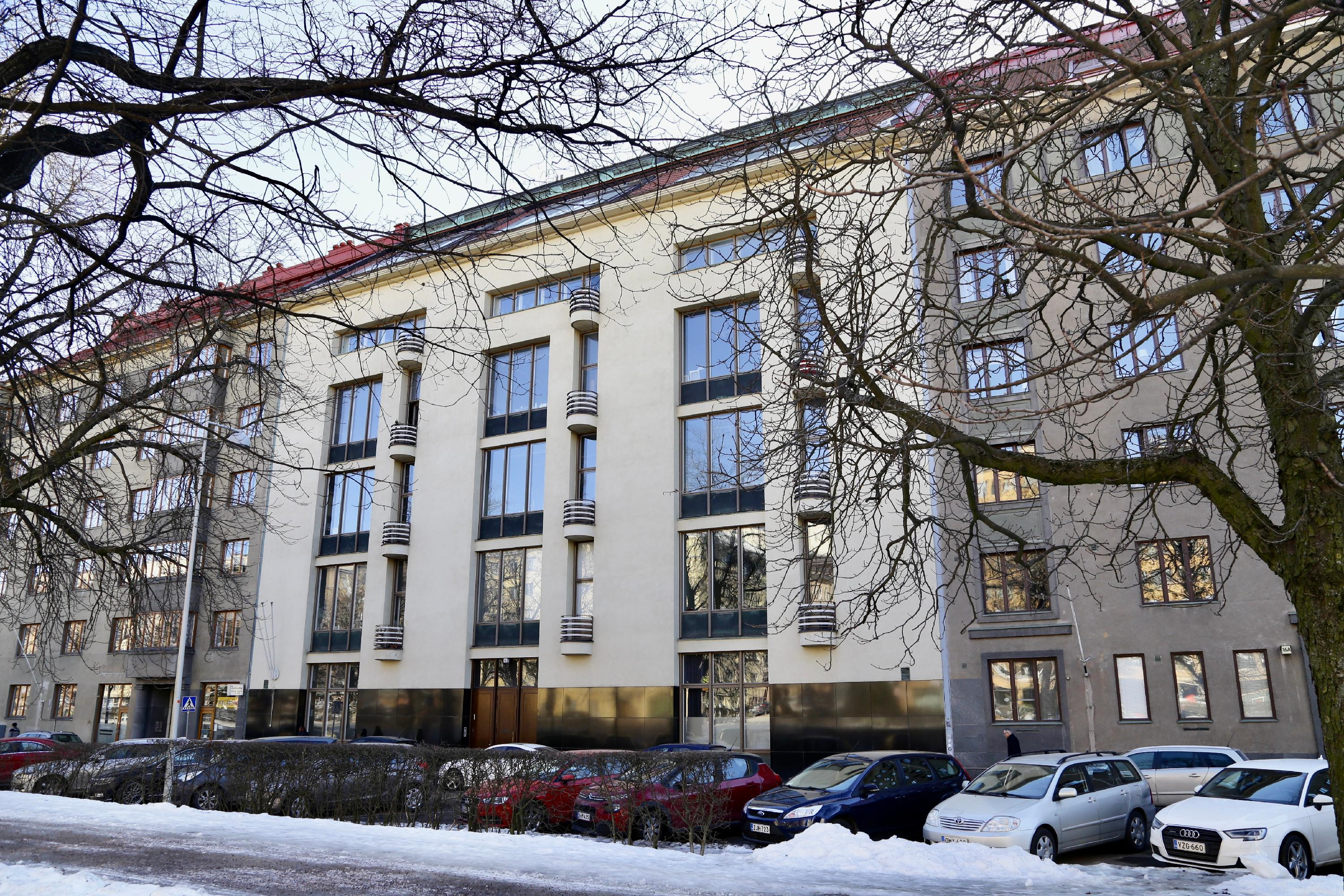
Lallukka Artists' Home at Eteläinen Hesperiankatu 14 in Helsinki

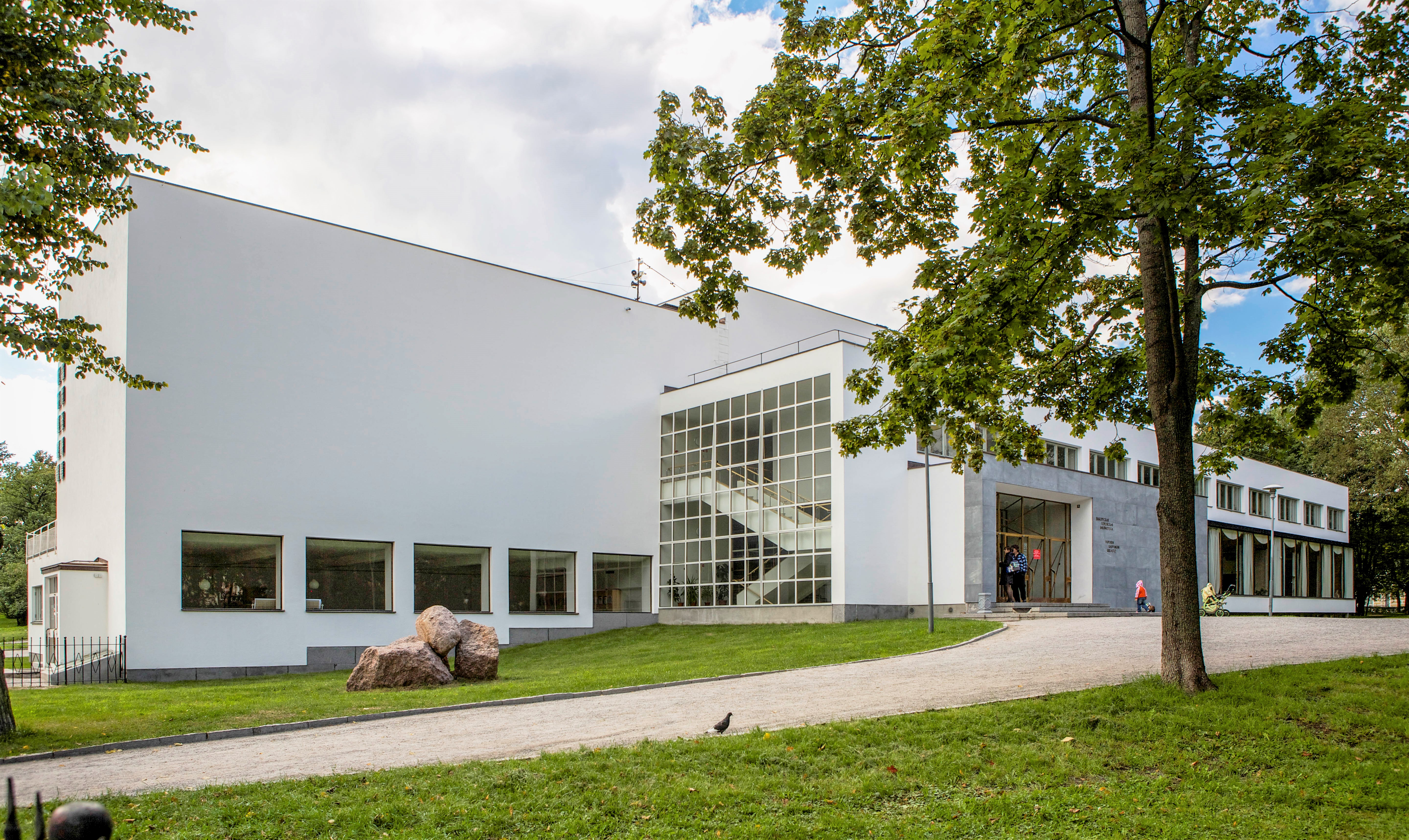
The Vyborg City Library

Juho Lallukka (February 3, 1852 in Räisälä, Grand Duchy of Finland – December 1, 1913 in Vyborg, Grand Duchy of Finland) was a Finnish businessman, commercial counsellor, a patron of the arts, philanthropist, and the chairman of the Industrialists' and Businessmen's Society Pamaus. He rose among the wealthiest in Finland and Viipuri.

== Biography ==
He was born in Räisälä in the Karelian Isthmus, in a poor peasant family. He began his career as a shepherd boy and worked different jobs such as shoemaking, shopboy, sales clerk, and land seller.

In 1891, he co-founded the wholesale firm "Häkli, Lallukka ja kumpp." The business sold goods that had been purchased on trips to Saint Petersburg, as well as in Hamburg and Lübeck. The company opened a branch at Pohjoisesplanadi in Helsinki, which sold retail products.

Trade in Vyborg was controlled by Swedes, Germans, and Russians. They mocked the Finns, saying that they were too stupid and slow for commerce. However, the majority of Vyborg's population was Finnish, and Lallukka promoted his wholesale business through Finnish identity. His business partners were Finnish merchant Jaakko Häkli and a Russian merchant named Vilhelm Paischeff.

Vyborg grew at a remarkable pace. At one point, its trade was more extensive than that of Helsinki. At another stage, Vyborg accounted for a quarter of all trade in the Grand Duchy of Finland. This created the need to establish a Vyborg-based society around commerce and industry. He was a founding member of the Industrialists' and Businessmen's Society Pamaus (Teollisuuden- ja liikkeenharjoittajain Seura Pamaus). The society was founded in 1891. Emperor Alexander III of Russia and the Imperial Senate of Finland granted permission for the establishment of the society. Lallukka served as the chairman from 1902 to 1913.

Lallukka was an active supporter of Finnish nationalism and cultural development during the era of the Grand Duchy of Finland. He served as a member of parliament. Lallukka was a supporter of the Old Finnish Party, and later he served as a member of parliament for the party. During the years of oppression under the Russian Empire, the Old Finns pursued a policy of compliance toward Russia. Vyborg's economy benefited from the markets of Saint Petersburg and Russia. Has involved in city governance.

He was a major patron of the arts, including financing the city's theater in Vyborg. Lallukka made numerous donations, but he kept a low profile regarding them. He supported theaters, schools, institutes, the Vyborg Lyceum, the Vyborg student nation, male choirs, and many other causes.

In addition, entered in history of Vyborg as a patron of the arts, in particular, he financed city legitimate drama. One of streets of Vyborg was named after him (presently is a Mayakovsky street).

Lallukka commissioned the construction of a National Romantic style building, designed by architect Allan Schulman, at the corner of today's Vokzalnaya Street 7 (formerly Repolankatu) and Mayakovskogo Street (formerly Viskaalinkatu and Lallukankatu). The building is decorated with sculptures and ornaments by Eemil Halonen and other Finnish artists. It was completed in 1906.

He received the honorary title of commercial counsellor (kauppaneuvos) from Emperor Nicholas II in 1908.

Before the First World War, Lallukka purchased an enormous quantity of grain from Saint Petersburg. Many people thought it was a typographical error. Then, the First World War broke out. Grain prices rose significantly, and Lallukka's estate made major profits. He had a sharp business instinct.

In November 1913, Lallukka was on his way home from the Pamaus Society's clubhouse, which was his favorite place to spend evenings. He walked home with his coat open and caught pneumonia. Medicine could not help him, and Lallukka passed away a few days later.

On Southern Hesperiankatu and Apollonkatu in Helsinki stands the Lallukka Artists' Home, which was built with donations from Lallukka. The apartments in the artists' home are available to visual, performing, and musical artists. Its purpose is to secure the livelihood of artists. The building is owned by the Juho and Maria Lallukka Artists' Home Foundation. The building was completed in 1934. The list of the building's residents from 1934 onwards is impressive. It begins with composer and conductor Robert Kajanus, who founded the Helsinki Philharmonic Orchestra. There, for example, Ilmari Hannikainen, Armas Järnefelt, and Aarre Merikanto composed music. In the studios, among others, Ellen Thesleff, Tyko Sallinen, and Veikko Vionoja painted. Sculptors, in addition to many others, included Essi Renvall, Eila Hiltunen, and Kain Tapper. Lallukka housed leading figures of Finnish theatre such as Emmi Jurkka, Uljas Kandolin, and Tauno Palo.

Lallukka is remembered in popular culture as an old-time patron who was sociable, humorous, and cheerful. He is remembered for his generosity, hospitality, and benevolence. For Lallukka, money was a tool through which he supported culture and education.

== Awards ==
- Russia Commercial Counsellor (1908)
