= Ida Vihuri =

Finnish politician (1882–1929)

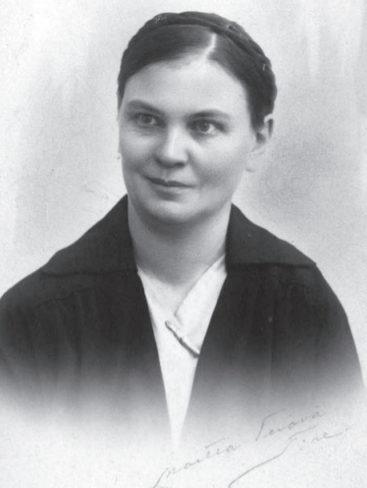
- Ida Vihuri in 1929

Member of the Finnish Parliament for Häme North constituency
- In office 5 September 1922 – 7 September 1929

Personal details
- Born: 18 August 1882 Lempäälä, Grand Duchy of Finland
- Died: 7 September 1929 (aged 47) Tampere, Finland
- Party: Social Democratic Party of Finland

Ida Johanna Vihuri (born Hildén, 18 August 1882 – 7 September 1929) was a Finnish politician. She was a member of the Parliament of Finland 1922–1929 for the Social Democratic Party of Finland.

== Life and career ==
Vihuri was born to a peasant family in Lempäälä. Since the age of 13 she worked at the Finlayson cotton mill in Tampere. After the 1905 general strike, Vihuri joined the local trade union branch and became the leading unionist of the Finlayson mill.

During the 1918 Civil War of Finland, Vihuri served in the Red administration. Vihuri was captured after the Battle of Tampere and sentenced to life in prison, but she was pardoned in 1920. In the 1922 parliamentary election, Vihuri was elected to the Parliament of Finland.

Vihuri died on 7 September 1929 on her way to a party meeting in Kuru as the SS Kuru sank in the lake Näsijärvi. With at least 136 people drowning, the sinking remains the deadliest Finnish inland shipping disaster. Vihuri was buried at the Kalevankangas Cemetery.

== Family ==
Ida Vihuri's sister was the politician Kaisa Hiilelä who was a Member of the Parliament in 1930–1958. Their nephew was the Minister of Education Reino Oittinen.
