= Juho Tulikoura =

Finnish farmer and politician (1862–1918)

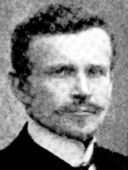
Juho Tulikoura

Juho Tulikoura (29 May 1862 – 25 April 1918; surname until 1906 Brandstaka) was a Finnish farmer and politician, born in Vehkalahti. He was a member of the Parliament of Finland from 1906 to 1916, representing the Finnish Party from 1907 to 1913 and the Agrarian League after that. During the Finnish Civil War of 1918, Tulikoura, being a prominent representative of the White side, was arrested by Red Guards and summarily executed in Kouvola on 25 April 1918. Tulikoura was the elder brother of Aleksanteri Koskenheimo.
