= August Vesa =

Finnish politician

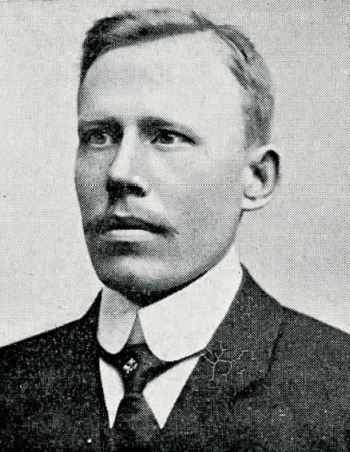

August Vesa (15 October 1878, Rantasalmi – 1 May 1918) was a Finnish journalist and politician. He was a Member of the Parliament of Finland from 1908 to 1909, representing the Social Democratic Party of Finland (SDP). During the Finnish Civil War, Vesa sided with the Reds, was arrested by White troops and shot.
