= Georg Eriksson =

Finnish politician (1901–1964)

Georg Werner Eriksson (19 January 1901, Jakobstad – 28 February 1964) was a Finnish goldsmith and politician. He was a member of the Parliament of Finland from 1958 until his death in 1964, representing the Social Democratic Party of Finland (SDP).
