= Taavetti Nuutinen =

Finnish construction worker and politician (1891–1932)

Taavetti Nuutinen (18 January 1891 – 25 November 1932) was a Finnish construction worker and politician, born in Karttula. He was a member of the Parliament of Finland from 1930 until his death in 1932, representing the Social Democratic Party of Finland (SDP).
