= Mikko Suokas =

Finnish farmer and politician (1893–1934)

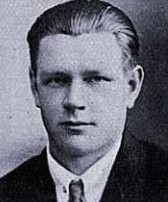
Member of the Parliament of Finland Mikko Suokas (1893-1934).

Mikko Suokas (22 September 1893 – 13 October 1934) was a Finnish farmer and politician, born in Kivennapa. He was a member of the Parliament of Finland from 1927 until his death in 1934, representing the Social Democratic Party of Finland (SDP). He was a presidential elector in the 1925 and 1931 presidential elections.
