= Jere Juutilainen =

Finnish house painter and politician (1889–1949)

Jeremias "Jere" Juutilainen (26 June 1889 – 7 November 1949) was a Finnish house painter and politician, born in Suonenjoki. He was a member of the Parliament of Finland from 1936 until his death in 1949, representing the Social Democratic Party of Finland (SDP).

He was a presidential elector in the 1937, 1940 and 1943 presidential elections. Juutilainen participated in the Finnish Civil War of 1918 on the Red side.
