= Aleksanteri Koskenheimo =

Finnish farmer and politician (1876–1933)

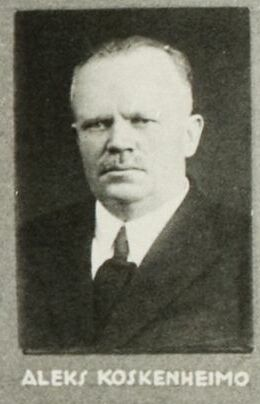
Aleksanteri Koskenheimo

Aleksanteri Koskenheimo (11 September 1876 – 18 February 1933; surname until 1906 Brandstaka) was a Finnish schoolteacher and politician, born in Vehkalahti. He was a member of the Parliament of Finland from 1930 until his death in 1933, representing the National Coalition Party. He was a presidential elector in the 1925 presidential election. He was the younger brother of Juho Tulikoura.
