= Oskari Suutala =

Finnish journalist and politician (1887–1919)

Juho Oskari Suutala (10 May 1887 – 25 February 1919) was a Finnish journalist and politician, born in Töysä. He was a member of the Parliament of Finland from 1917 until 1918, representing the Social Democratic Party of Finland (SDP). During the Finnish Civil War of 1918, he was imprisoned for having sided with the Reds. He died in detention.
