= Juho Ryynänen =

Finnish farmer, cooperative organizer, and politician (1873–1933)

Juho Gabriel (J. G.) Ryynänen (11 October 1873 – 18 September 1933) was a Finnish farmer, cooperative organizer and politician, born in Pielisjärvi. He was a member of the Parliament of Finland from 1919 until his death in 1933, representing the Agrarian League. He was a presidential elector in the 1925 Finnish presidential election.
