= Pekka Silander =

Finnish electrician and politician (1925–1968)

Pekka Tuomo Kaleva Silander (15 March 1925 – 14 May 1968) was a Finnish electrician, trade union official and politician, born in Askainen. He was a member of the Parliament of Finland from 1966 until his death in 1968, representing the Finnish People's Democratic League (SKDL). He was a member of the Communist Party of Finland (SKP).
