= Pekka Kuusi =

Finnish social scientist and politician (1917–1989)

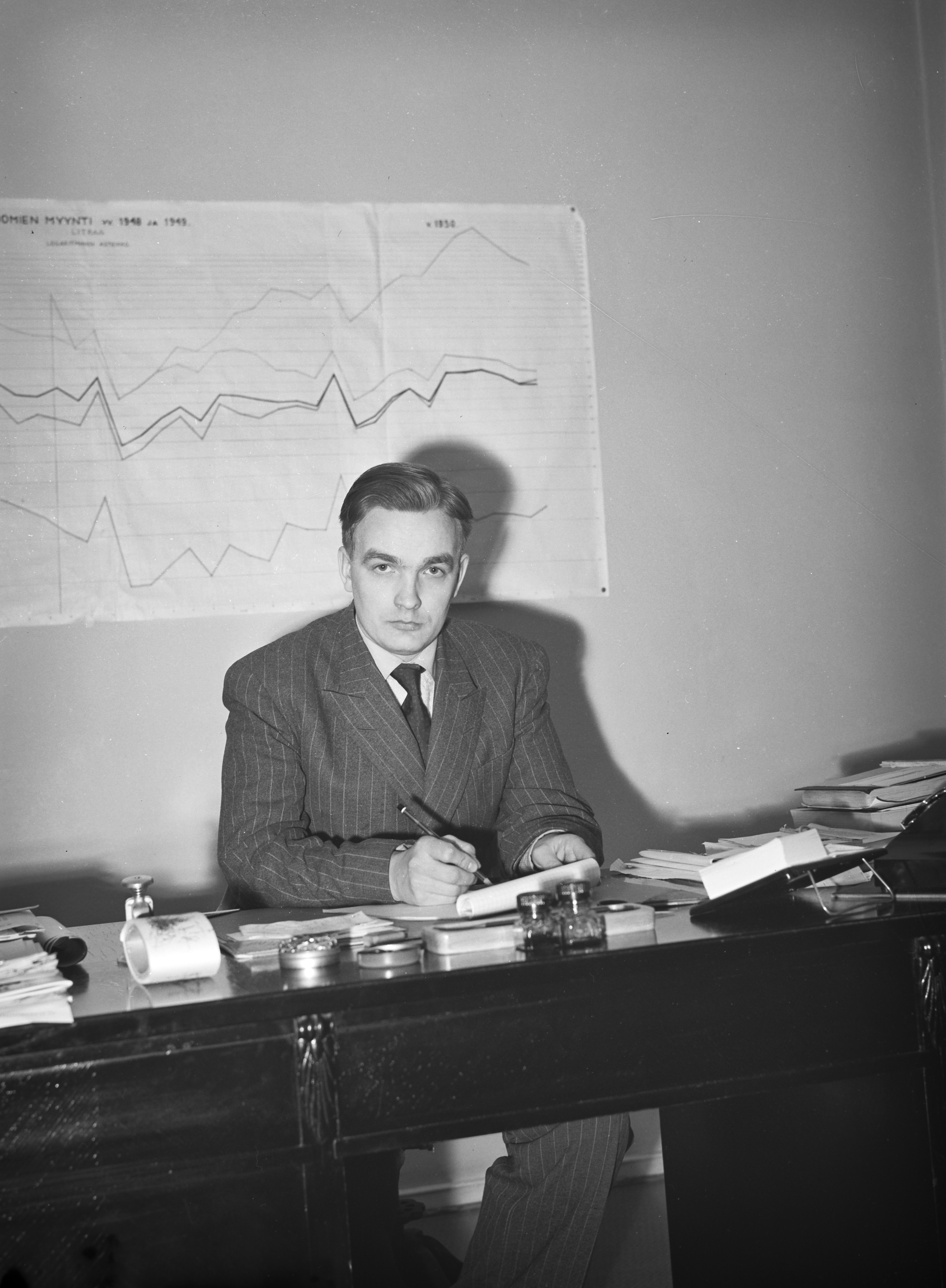
Pekka Kuusi in the early 1950s

Pekka Juhana Kuusi (9 July 1917 – 25 May 1989) was a Finnish social scientist and politician, born in Helsinki. He was a member of the Parliament of Finland from 1966 to 1970, representing the Social Democratic Party of Finland (SDP). He served as Minister of Social Affairs from 26 March 1971 to 28 October 1971. Kuusi was a presidential elector in the 1968 Finnish presidential election. He was the CEO of Alko from 1972 to 1982. He was the younger brother of Matti Kuusi.
