= Väinö Kuoppala =

Finnish agronomist, farmer and politician (1914–1963)

Väinö Jooseppi Kuoppala (22 April 1914 – 2 September 1963) was a Finnish agronomist, farmer and politician, born in Ylistaro. He was a member of the Parliament of Finland from 1962 until his death in 1963, representing the National Coalition Party.
