= League of Workers Association Youth =

Scouthlike Finnish youth

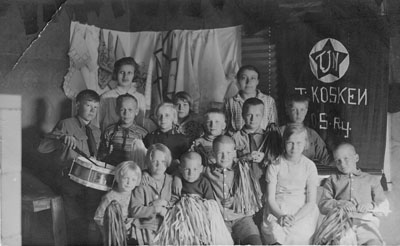
TJN group in Imatra

League of Workers Association Youth (Finnish: Työväen järjestönuorten liitto) was a socialist youth movement in Finland 1917-1928. TJN organized children and youth up to the age of 16. The activities of TJN resembled scouting.
