= Ernst Saari =

Finnish politician (1882–1918)

Johan Ernst Saari (20 July 1882 – 29 March 1918; original surname Ylisaari) was a Finnish farmer and politician, born in Lapua. He was a member of the Parliament of Finland from 1913 until his death in 1918, representing the Finnish Party. During the Finnish Civil War, being a prominent supporter of the White side, he was arrested by Red Guards and shot in Tampere on 29 March 1918, as White troops were preparing to storm the city.
