= SS Kuru =

Passenger steamship which sank in the lake Näsijärvi in Tampere, Finland (1929)

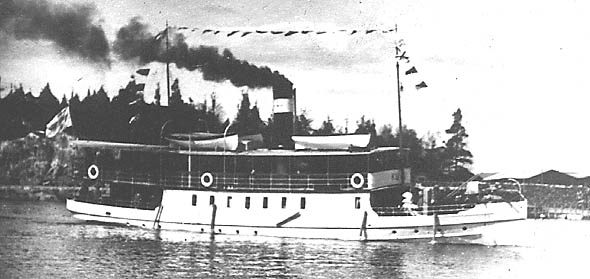
- SS Kuru before the accident

History
- Builder: Hällströn & Waldensin
- Launched: 1915
- Fate: Sank on 7 September 1929

General characteristics
- Type: Steam ship
- Tonnage: 3220 GRT
- Length: 30 m
- Beam: 5,58 m

SS Kuru was a steam ship which sank on 7 September 1929 in the lake Näsijärvi, in Tampere, Finland.

The sinking is still the most severe maritime disaster in Finnish lakes or rivers. It led to the loss of 136 lives, according to the passenger counts and the officers; most sources frequently list the death toll as 138. There were 150 passengers and 12 crew members. One of the drowned was Ida Vihuri, a member of the Parliament of Finland.

The ship capsized due to heavy wind – 8 Beauforts (17–20 metres per second (61–72 km/h; 38–45 mph)), and there were some claims of up to 11.5 Beauforts. The capsizing was mostly due to an overly-high centre of gravity; in 1927, a third deck level had been added without expert help or inspecting the balance of the ship. The big waves brought water onto the deck, and the water couldn't flow away.

The wreck was raised the same year and repaired; the ship had suffered only minor damage. Some cabin structures were removed to improve the balance. She served until 1939.

During the First World War, the ship served as a part of the Imperial Russian Navy's Satakunta Flotilla.
