= Antti Halonen (politician) =

Finnish politician

Antti Halonen (14 June 1885, Jaakkima – 5 July 1942) was a Finnish farmer, lay preacher and politician. He was a member of the Parliament of Finland from 1930 until his death in 1942, representing the Agrarian League.
