= Lassi Hiekkala =

Finnish politician and journalist (1888–1951)

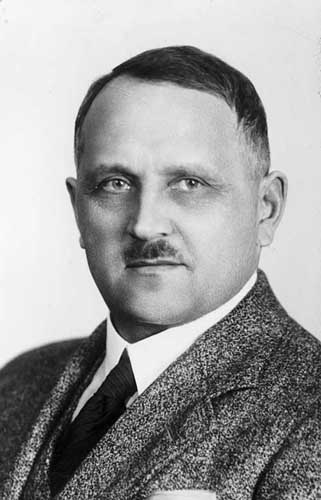
Lassi Hiekkala in 1936.

Lassi Hiekkala (23 November 1888 in Kuopion maalaiskunta – 5 October 1951; name until 1907 Lauri Hoffrén) was a Finnish journalist and politician. He began his political career in the Agrarian League. He was later elected to the Parliament of Finland, where he represented the National Progressive Party from 1945 to 1951 and the People's Party of Finland in 1951.
