= Juho Rikkonen =

Finnish politician

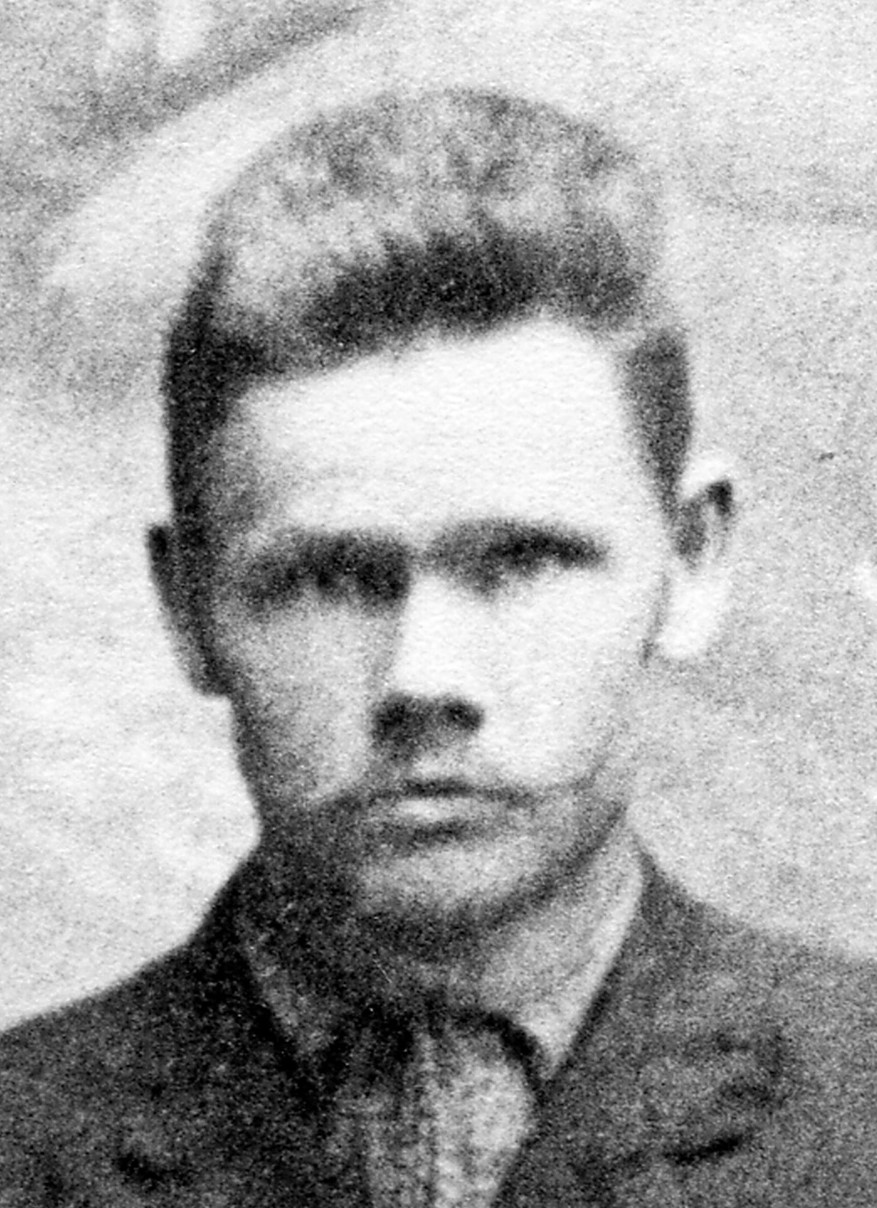
Juho Rikkonen

Johan (Juho) Rikkonen (11 December 1874 – May 1918) was a Finnish bricklayer and politician. He was a member of the Parliament of Finland from 1916 to 1918, representing the Social Democratic Party of Finland (SDP). He was born in Jääski. In 1918, during the Finnish Civil War, he sided with the Reds. He was taken prisoner by White troops and shot in Viipuri in May 1918.
