= Yrjö Räisänen =

Finnish politician and journalist

Kaarlo Yrjö Räisänen (16 February 1888 – 18 June 1948) was a Finnish journalist and politician, born in Kuopio. He was a member of the Parliament of Finland from 1930 to 1941 and again from 1944 until his death in 1948, representing first the Social Democratic Party of Finland (SDP) and later the Finnish People's Democratic League (SKDL).

Räisänen was in prison for political reasons from 1941 to 1944. After he was freed, he joined the SKDL and the Socialist Unity Party (SYP), a member organisation of the SKDL.

He is buried in the Hietaniemi Cemetery in Helsinki.
