= Viljo Kilpeläinen =

Finnish politician

Finland Viljo Kilpeläinen

Viljo Oskari Kilpeläinen (15 August 1906 – 12 May 1937) was a Finnish industrial worker and politician, born in Pudasjärvi. He served as a Member of the Parliament of Finland from 1936 until his death in 1937, representing the Social Democratic Party of Finland (SDP).
