= Timeline of Independence of Finland (1917–1920) =

This is a timeline of the Independence of Finland. Timeline starts from February Revolution and ends with membership of the League of Nations. Events take place in Saint Petersburg and Finland.

References;

== 1917 ==
- 7 March: February Revolution starts in Saint Petersburg
- 15 March: Prince Georgy Lvov forms a Provisional government in Saint Petersburg
- 15 March: Czar Nicholas II abdicates
- 16 March: Governor-General of Finland Franz Albert Seyn is removed from his office and arrested
- 20 March: Provisional government imprisons the Imperial family
- 19 March: Mikhail Aleksandrovich Stakhovich became new Governor-General of Finland
- 20 March: March manifesto is abolished
- 26 March: Oskari Tokoi is appointed as the Chairmen of the Senate
- 16 April: Vladimir Lenin arrives by train from Switzerland via Germany, to Saint Petersburg
- 16 July: Protests by pro-Bolshevik forces in Petrograd
- 18 July: Parliament of Finland accepts the Act of Rule of Law
- 21 July: Aleksandr Kerensky becomes the new Premier of the Provisional government of Russia
- 31 July: Provisional government of Russia dissolves the Parliament of Finland
- 17 August: Oskari Tokoi resigns from the Senate
- 17 August: E.N. Setälä becomes the new Chairman of the Senate
- 17 September: Nikolai Vissarionovich Nekrasov become the new Governor-General of Finland
- 1-2 October: General elections in Finland; Social Democratic Party loses its majority
- 7 November: Bolshevik revolution in Petrograd
- 8 November: Labour movement forms Revolution Councils in Finland
- 15 November: Parliament of Finland declares itself as the supreme authority in Finland with the support of the Soviet government
- 4 December: Svinhufvud senate declares Independence of Finland
- 6 December: Parliament accepts the Independence of Finland
- 31 December: Soviet government recognizes the Independence of Finland
- 31 December: Åland declares itself as part of Sweden

== 1918 ==
- 4 January: Soviet parliament ratifies the recognition of Finnish independence
- 4 January: Sweden and France recognize Finnish independence
- 6 January: Germany recognizes Finnish independence
- 10 January: Norway and Denmark recognize Finnish independence
- 25 January: National Guard is declared as government troops
- 27 January: Labour movement takes power in Finland
- 15 February: Swedish naval ships arrive at Åland
- 16 May: White Army marches to Helsinki
- 18 May: P. E. Svinhufvud becomes State Regent of Finland
- 27 May: J. K. Paasivi becomes Deputy Chairman of the Senate
- 29 May: Blue cross flag became the flag of Finland
- 9 August: Parliament accepts the Constitution of 1772 and starts the process of electing a monarch
- 9 October: Parliament selects Prince Frederick Charles of Hesse as King of Finland
- 27 November: Paasikivi Senate resigns
- 12 December: Mannerheim becomes State Regent of Finland
- 14 December: Prince Frederick Charles of Hesse abdicates

== 1919 ==
- 3 March: General elections in Finland: Republican front gets majority
- 17 April: Kaarlo Castrén becomes the Prime Minister of Finland
- 6 May: United Kingdom recognizes the Independence of Finland
- 7 May: United States recognizes the Independence of Finland
- 21 June: Parliament accepts the Republican form of Government
- 17 July: State Regent Mannerheim ratifies the Republican form of Government
- 25 July: K.J. Ståhlberg becomes the first President of Finland
- 6 December: Finland's independent day becomes 6 December

== 1920 ==
- 26 July: Finland takes the Åland Islands dispute to the League of Nations.
- 14 October: Finland and Soviet Russia sign a peace treaty in Tartu.
- 16 December: Finland becomes a member of the League of Nations.
