= History of Finland (1917–present) =

This is the history of Finland from 1917 onwards.

== Independence ==
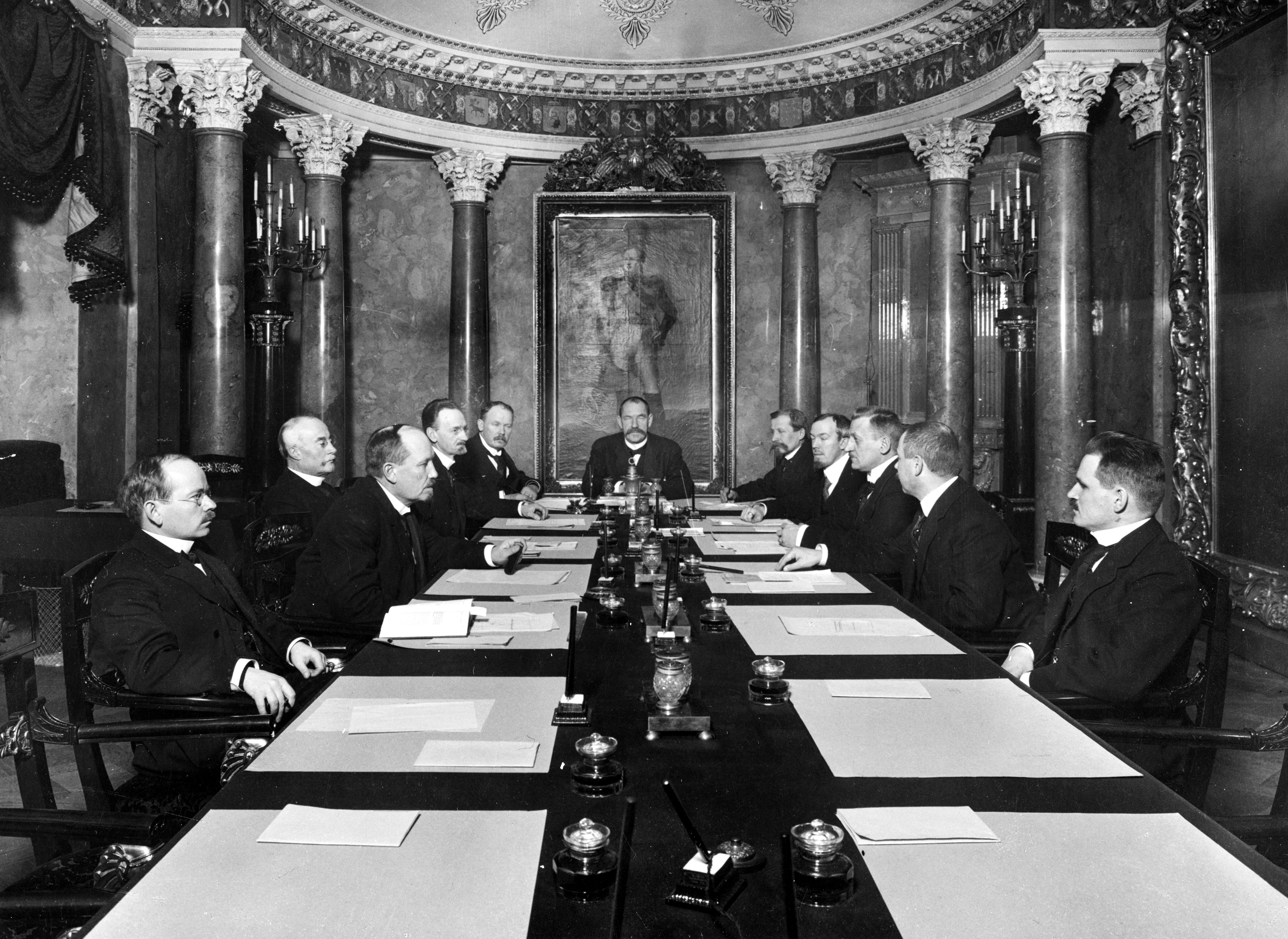
The first government of independent Finland.

Finnish nationalism started growing in the 19th century alongside European nationalist movements. Runeberg's The Tales of Ensign Stål and Lönnrot's Kalevala formed a basis for the nation's cultural identity.

World War I and internal problems caused a revolution in Russia in 1917. Finland took advantage of the situation and began to explore the possibilities for greater autonomy or even independence. The Russian Provisional Government responded negatively to the independence project, and suggested that a decision could only be made once the constitutional convention would convene.

Following the defeat of the Provisional Government in the Bolshevik led October Revolution of November 1917, Finland's political class was divided on how to approach independence. The right wanted to seek recognition for independence from the West, while the left wanted to first be recognized by the new Bolshevik government.

The Parliament convened on December 6, 1917, and approved of right-led senate's (the functional government at the time) declaration of independence. Russia officially recognized Finland on January 4, 1918, as did Sweden and France. Germany gave recognition on January 6, 1918.

== Civil War ==
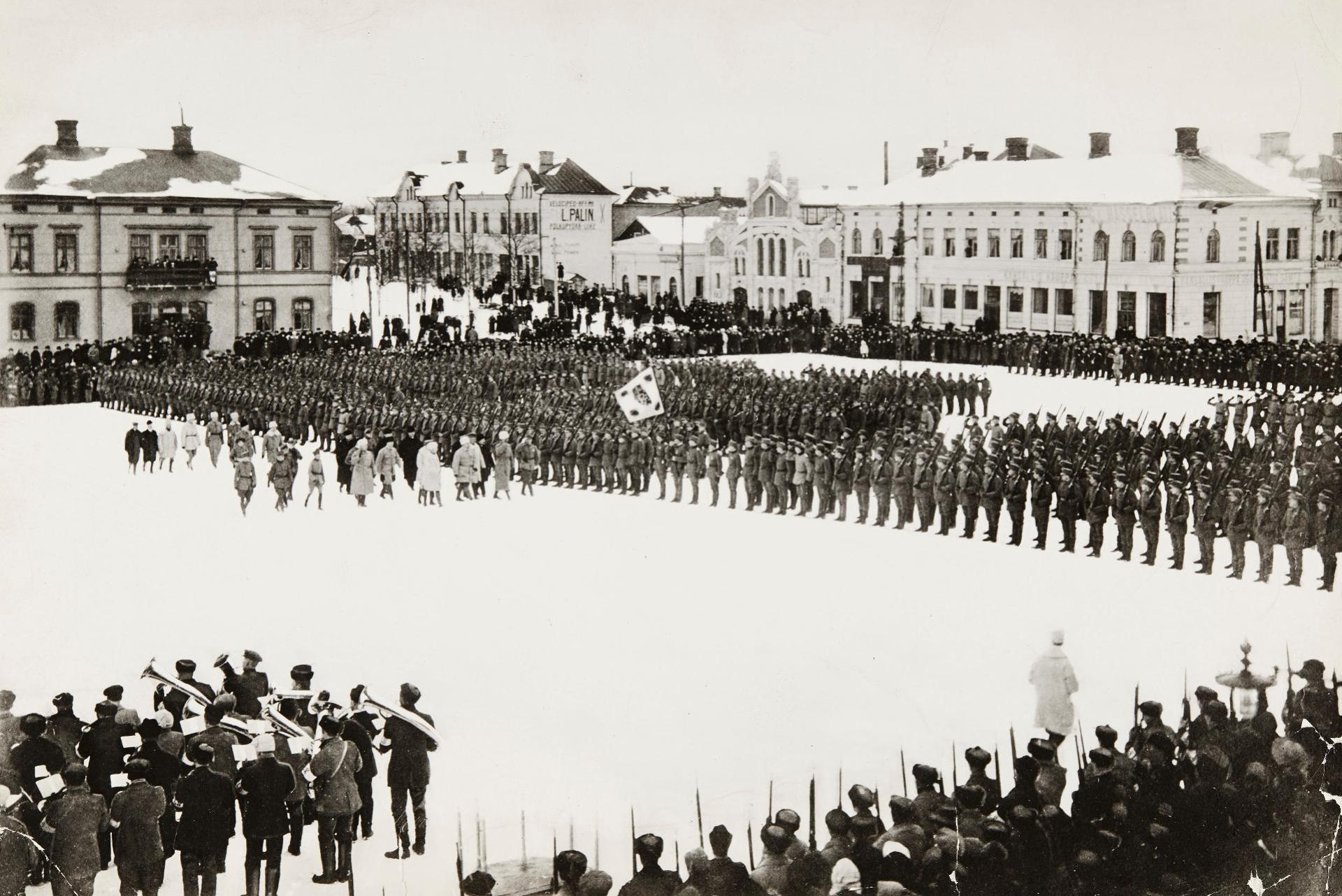
Freshly arrived members of the Jäger Movement in Vaasa in 1918.

As part of the aftermath of World War I, Finland had a civil war. The war took place between the Finnish Senate (the government) and the forces led by the Finnish People's Delegation, on January 27 to May 16, 1918. The Senate troops were called whites, while the people's delegation's forces were named reds. World War I had caused the fragmentation of the Russian Empire through the internal disintegration, leading to a struggle for power in Finland whose political system was in transition to the parliamentarian system. In addition, society was socially and economically divided. The main consequence of this division was the formation of two armed centers of power in the country. The crisis then culminated in a war between them in January 1918. The Whites won the war with the support of Imperial Germany. The Reds backed by Soviet Russia lost the war. As a result, Finland moved from the Russian domain to the German sphere of influence. After Germany's defeat in WWI, the independence of the Finnish nation was confirmed and the country's government was to become a republican democracy. While the civil war was characterized by political terror, it was only after the war that the greatest loss of life was experienced in prison camps, where about 13,000 reds died. The Civil War claimed a total of about 37,000 victims, of which about 75% were Finnish reds. The other victims were Finnish whites, Germans and Russians. From a psychological and material point of view, the Civil War was the most destructive event in the history of the Finnish nation, traumatizing the population and splitting it in two. However, as a result of the outcome of the First World War, the moderate left and the right were able to establish, shortly after the Civil War, the cooperation that united the Finns over time.

== The early life of independent Finland ==
After the Civil War, Finland's form of government was to be a monarchy. Friedrich Karl had already been elected king of Finland, but the kingdom project was over when Germany lost in The First World War. Finland then became a republic whose government was confirmed on July 17, 1919. Shortly thereafter, K.J. Ståhlberg was elected president of Finland.

In 1920 Finland signed a peace and border agreement with Soviet Russia in Tartu, Estonia. For the first time, the treaty defined the boundaries of an independent Finland, which were based on the borders of the Grand Duchy of Finland. The inhabitants of Repola and Porajärvi had demanded that the municipalities be annexed to Finland and in practice they had already been controlled by Finland, but the peace agreement restored them to Russia. However, Finland received the Pechenga region from Russia.

Relations with Soviet Russia since 1922 onwards were also burdened by the question of East Karelia. Finland wanted greater autonomy, citing the relevant provisions of the Tartu Peace Agreement, but the Soviet Union considered that nominal autonomy was sufficient. The League of Nations said it was an internal matter of the Soviet Union and did not intervene despite Finland's requests.

Another problem was the status of Åland, which Sweden had occupied during the Finnish Civil War. The Åland people wanted to join Sweden, but this claim was strictly rejected. In 1921, the League of Nations finally resolved the question according to Finland's wishes.

In 1932, Finland's security problem was tried to be resolved with a defense union with Estonia, Latvia and Poland, but the Parliament did not ratify the treaty, and in 1932 a non-aggression pact was concluded between Finland and the Soviet Union. In the second half of the 1930s, a defense alliance was also planned between Finland and Sweden, which also failed in the resistance of the Soviet Union.

In the 1920s and 1930s, efforts were made to resolve the structural conflicts that had long plagued Finland. Language disputes between the Swedish and Finnish-speaking sections of the population were successfully put to an end by language legislation.

In 1918, 70% of the population made a living from agriculture and forestry. The land reforms of 1919 and 1922 improved the situation of rural sharecroppers and farm workers. A total of 126,000 holdings were redeemed as independents.

During Ståhlberg's presidency in 1919–1925, the right wing and centrist groups were in power. The longest prison sentences following the Civil War were pardoned. The Finnish Social Democratic Party reorganized under the leadership of Väinö Tanner, and after forming a minority government in 1926, gave general amnesty.

Ståhlberg deliberately pursued a strong unification policy to reduce the gap caused by the Civil War. During his time, the country underwent numerous social reforms in legislation and taxation, which increased equality and improved living standards.

In August 1918, the most radical Social Democrats fled to Russia at the end of the Civil War and founded the Finnish Communist Party (SKP), which was not allowed to operate legally in Finland. Thus, the SKP and its allies established the Socialist Workers' Party as their legal form, which received 27 seats in the 1922 elections. However, the police arrested all of its MPs on charges of treason and banned the party in 1923. With the growth of communism, the fascist Lapua Movement, which from 1929 to 1932 acted against communist newspapers, organized mass demonstrations and terrorized individual citizens. The communists were prevented from taking part in the 1930 elections and their activities in all forms were banned. The anti-communist laws restricted freedom of printing, association and assembly.

Svinhufvud was elected as president in 1931 with the support of the Lapua. Soon the movement turned against the Social Democrats, and after an attempted coup in 1932 known as the Mäntsälä rebellion, the president intervened and, with his radio speech, brought the rebellion to an end. There was also an economic shortage in the same years.

A major failure was the Prohibition Act of 1919–1932, which led to an increase in the number and severity of crime and significantly increased alcohol consumption. Prohibition was abolished only after the referendum in 1932.

== World War II ==
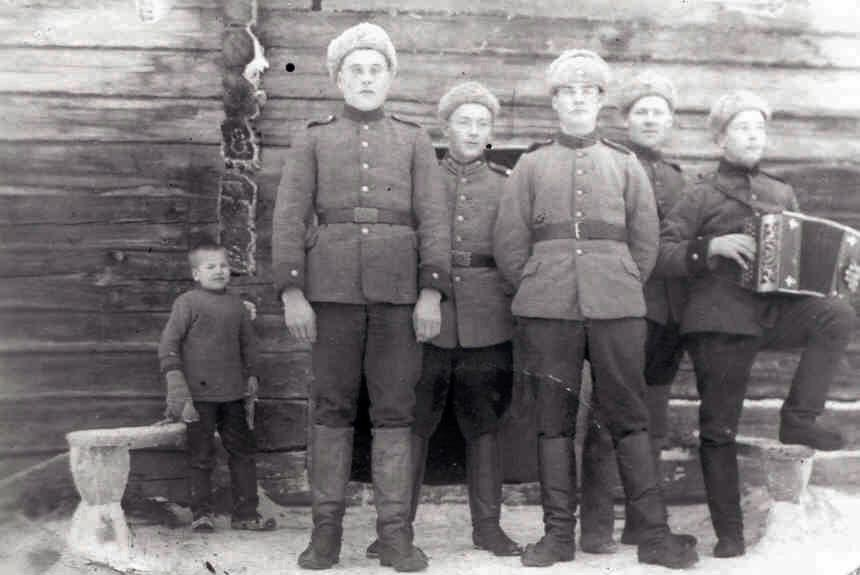
Finnish troops in Winter War.

During Second World War, Finland fought three wars: the Winter War, the Continuation War and the Lapland War.

The secret protocol to the Molotov–Ribbentrop Pact between the Soviet Union and Germany of August 1939 defined Finland as part of the Soviet Union's sphere of interest. In the autumn of 1939, the Soviet Union called for negotiations to secure Leningrad and demanded Finland's territory from the Karelian Isthmus, a base in Hanko and the outer islands of the Gulf of Finland. According to official Soviet propaganda, these areal losses would have been replaced by exchanging them for regions of Eastern Karelia (Porajärvi and Repola).

Following the interrupted negotiations, the Soviet Union invaded Finland on November 30, 1939, after the Shelling of Mainila, and the Winter War began. The war ended with the signing of the Moscow Peace Treaty in March 1940, in which Finland ceded 9% of its territory to the Soviet Union. However, the Soviets' attempt to install their Finnish Democratic Republic puppet government into Helsinki and annex Finland into the Soviet Union had failed.

The planning of the Nordic Defence Union continued after the end of the Winter War. However, the project failed again.

After the attack on the Soviet Union by Nazi Germany, Finland joined it in June 1941 with the aim of at least recovering the released territories. While this was the case at first, in addition a large part of East Karelia was occupied in an effort to create a Greater Finland. The Continuation War ended in the summer of 1944 with new territorial losses. According to the truce of September 19, 1944, the Germans had to be driven from the country. Following this, the Lapland War was waged against the former ally Germany in Lapland, ending on April 27, 1945. German troops destroyed large areas of Lapland as they retreated.

According to the Truce Treaty, Finland had to hand over Petsamo and rent Porkkala as a base for 50 years, in addition to the territorial losses that had followed the Winter War. The war reparations were set at $300 million. The terms of the Truce Agreement were definitively laid down in the Treaty of Paris in 1947.

== Neutral Finland ==
After World War II, Finland was in the grey zone between the West and the Soviet Union. The 1948 agreement between Finland and the Soviet Union on friendship, cooperation and mutual assistance, 'the YYA Agreement', attached Finland militarily to the same camp as the Soviet Union, although Finland officially declared that it was an impartial state. The agreement was extended in 1955, 1970 and 1983. Many politicians used Soviet relations to settle party political disputes, which naturally led to an increase in Soviet influence. Others worked resolutely to resist the influence of the Soviet Union.

After the war reparations were paid, trade with the Soviet Union continued and was as high as 25% of foreign trade in the 1980s. In 1956, the Soviet Union gave up Porkkala's base prematurely. The 50-year contract was not originally due to end until 1994. In 1956, Urho Kekkonen was elected president.

The Soviet Union is considered to have tried on several occasions to intervene indirectly or otherwise by exerting pressure on Finland's domestic political situation and government decisions, such as during the Night Frost Crisis of 1958 and the October 1961 Note Crisis.

During the Cold War, Finland also developed into one of the centers of the East-West espionage, in which both the KGB and the CIA played their parts.

From the late 1960s to the early 1980s, the so-called Taistoism movement, the pro-Soviet minority of the SKP and the extreme left, admired the Soviet Union visibly in the fields of culture and media.

At the beginning of 1973, Kekkonen was made president without elections and opponents by the Parliament, which some now regard as the trough of a democratic deficit. Contrary to today, at that time the President had a great deal of power in Finland and could, if he so wished, dissolve parliament and the government almost arbitrarily.

In 1973, Finland concluded the EEC free trade agreement with Western European countries. The EEC agreement was opposed by a full-page announcement published in Helsingin Sanomat, signed by many well-known politicians.

In 1975, the OSCE conference was held in Helsinki, which not only strengthened Kekkonen's and Finland's neutrality in the eyes of the West, but also sowed the seeds of the disintegration of the communist governments of Eastern Europe when the so-called Helsinki groups were founded by local opposition forces, inspired by the human rights section of the convention.

Urho Kekkonen resigned from his office as president at the end of 1981 due to illness. He served as president for more than 25 years, much longer than any other president. In 1982, Mauno Koivisto was elected president, who wanted to reduce the president's power and increase the prime minister's rights.

It was not until 1989 when Mikhail Gorbachev visited Finland that the Soviet Union explicitly recognized Finland as a neutral country.

== Finland in an integrated Europe ==
The collapse of the Soviet Union in 1991 came as a complete surprise to Finland, but was immediately taken advantage of. Finland unilaterally rejected the military aspects of the Paris peace agreement, except for border agreements. In 1992, Finland and Russia replaced the so-called "YYA" agreement.

In 1991, as a result of the banking crisis and the collapse of Soviet export trade, the Finnish economy began its dive into its deepest recession since the Great Depression of the 1930s (see depression in Finland in the early 1990s). In a few years, 450 000 jobs disappeared, and unemployment rose to 16%. It was not until 1994 that GDP growth re-emerged.

In autumn 1989, the convergence of Finland and the European Community began with the decision to join the European Economic Area (EEA). However, it did not enter into force until January 1, 1994, by which time the negotiations on actual membership were already well advanced.

The first in favour of EC membership were the Finnish economic interest groups in the early 1990s. Politicians had long held reservations in public, avoiding annoying the Soviet Union in midst of its transformation. Even in the Finnish Broadcasting Corporation's election debate in March 1991, only Ole Norrback of the RKP was openly in favor of membership and the application for EC membership was not recorded directly in Esko Aho's (Centre Party) government programme. President Mauno Koivisto was cautious and said later in the spring of 1991,"I haven't bothered to resist it recently.". During the spring and summer of 1991, the National Coalition and the opposition party SDP turned their positions EC-friendly, and after Prime Minister Aho came behind membership in the autumn, the government in January 1992 issued a report to Parliament, which decided to propose a candidate for membership.

Following a positive vote in Parliament, Finland's application for EC membership was submitted on March 18, 1992. The accession negotiations began on February 1, 1993, simultaneously with Sweden and Austria. One of the most painful issues in the accession negotiations was the taking into account of Finland's northern climate in the agricultural aid policy. As a concession, Finland was eventually authorized to support agriculture with its own resources, in addition to EC subsidies. The accession negotiations were concluded at the same time as Martti Ahtisaari became Finland's 10th president, and the first to be elected by direct a two-round popular vote.

The importance of EC membership was justified to the public particularly for economic reasons and with access to decision-making, but the security policy aspect was also at least equally important for many. On October 16, 1994, Esko Aho's previous promise was held with a referendum. It was Finland's second-ever consultative referendum, the earlier being for the repeal of the Prohibition Act at the end of 1931. In the EU referendum, 57% voted in favour of membership. A separate referendum was held in Åland, which was also in favor of membership.

On January 1, 1995, Finland joined the European Union along with Austria and Sweden. as the EC was now called with the entry into force of the Maastricht Treaty. In 1999, the Finnish markka was permanently fixed to the euro with FIM 5.94573 at EUR 1. In 2002, the euro became a cash currency and the markka, which had been in use for more than 140 years, was abolished after a two-month transitional period on May 1, 2002.

In addition to fast integration with the European Union, safety against Russian leverage has been increased by building fully NATO-compatible military. 1000 troops (a high per-capita amount) are simultaneously committed in NATO and UN operations. Finland has also opposed energy projects that increase dependency on Russian imports. For a long time, Finland remained one of the last non-NATO members in Europe, without enough support for full membership unless Sweden joined first.

On February 24, 2022, the Russian president Vladimir Putin ordered the Russian Armed Forces to begin the invasion of Ukraine. On February 25, a Russian Foreign Ministry spokesperson threatened Finland and Sweden with "military and political consequences" if they attempted to join NATO, which neither were actively seeking. After the invasion public support for membership rose significantly.

On April 4, 2023, the last NATO members ratified Finland's application to join the alliance, making Finland the 31st member.

In 2000, Finland's first female president, Tarja Halonen, took office. The former President of Finland, Martti Ahtisaari, received the Nobel Peace Prize in 2008. President Sauli Niinistö held office since 2012 until 2024. On March 1, 2024, Alexander Stubb, a staunch supporter of NATO, was sworn in as Finland's new president.
