= Finnish Party =

Finnish Party Suomalainen Puolue
- Founded: 1860s
- Dissolved: 1918
- Succeeded by: National Coalition Party; National Progressive Party
- Ideology: Finnish nationalism Conservatism

The Finnish Party (Finnish: Suomalainen Puolue) was a Fennoman conservative political party in the autonomous Grand Duchy of Finland and independent Finland. Born out of Finland's language strife in the 1860s, the party sought to improve the position of the Finnish language in Finnish society. Johan Vilhelm Snellman, Yrjö Sakari Yrjö-Koskinen, and Johan Richard Danielson-Kalmari were its ideological leaders. The party's chief organ was the Suometar newspaper, later Uusi Suometar, and its members were sometimes called Suometarians (suomettarelaiset).

During the 1880s, the party became divided over its policy towards Russification. A faction critical of Russia broke away to found the Young Finnish Party in 1894. The remaining party, increasingly known as the Old Finnish Party (vanhasuomalaiset), adopted the policy of appeasement toward Russian rule.

After the Finland's Independence in 1917, and the Civil War of 1918, the question of the new state's form of government became the decisive issue. The Young Finnish Party and the Old Finnish Party reorganized into two new parties: most of the Old Finns joined the conservative, monarchist National Coalition Party, while a minority aligned with the liberal, republican National Progressive Party.

== History ==
The party started to form around a core of Fennoman intellectuals in the 1860s, but remained formally unorganized for decades. Improving the status of the Finnish language, especially furthering its use in education, was a central issue from the start. In the 1877–1878 sessions of the Diet of Finland the party attained a leading role among the clergy and the peasantry, which it would hold till 1904.

In the 1880s, a faction within the party took a critical view of Russia, eventually breaking away and founding the Young Finnish Party in 1894. The Finnish Party sought legitimacy in the eyes of the Russian authorities and saw cooperation with Russia as a way to enact its language policies. When Russification began in 1899, the Young Finns advocated passive resistance, whereas the Finnish Party, now often called the Old Finns (vanhasuomalaiset), supported appeasement. Although the party maintained that Finland's rights were being violated, it emphasized the importance of keeping official positions in Finnish hands and feared that resistance could lead to further loss of autonomy.

Aside from the central language question, the party espoused conservative values and supported many social reforms, especially during Danielson-Kalmari's time as its ideological leader after Yrjö-Koskinen's death in 1903. On economic issues, the 1906 party program placed the party in the political centre, between the Social Democratic Party on the left and the Young Finns on the right. After the 1906 parliamentary reform, the party was consistently the biggest non-socialist party in parliamentary elections in 1907–1917 and the second biggest overall after the Social Democrats. However, it lost seats in every election, sliding down from 59 MPs in 1907 to 32 in 1917.

After the Finnish independence in December 1917 and the Civil War of 1918, Russification was no longer an issue and the language question had lost a great deal of its importance in Finnish politics. The main issues holding the party together were now secondary to economic and constitutional issues. Although it had agreed to establishing a republican form of government before the war, the party leadership now switched to supporting constitutional monarchy. Party leaders saw in a monarchy a bulwark against socialism and thought that the election of a German prince as a monarch would guarantee Germany's military support, but the plan failed when the First World War ended in a German capitulation and the abolition of German Monarchy. In December 1918, the party's supporters divided into two new parties, with a majority going to the conservative, monarchist National Coalition Party and a minority to the liberal, republican National Progressive Party.

== Prominent party figures ==
- Johan Vilhelm Snellman (1806-1881)
- Yrjö Sakari Yrjö-Koskinen (1830-1903)
- Juho Lallukka (1852-1913)
- Johan Richard Danielson-Kalmari (1853-1933)
- Lauri Ingman (1868-1934)
- Juho Kusti Paasikivi (1870-1956)
