= 1995 =

1995 in various calendars
- Gregorian calendar: 1995; MCMXCV
- Ab urbe condita: 2748
- Armenian calendar: 1444; ԹՎ ՌՆԽԴ
- Assyrian calendar: 6745
- Baháʼí calendar: 151–152
- Balinese saka calendar: 1916–1917
- Bengali calendar: 1401–1402
- Berber calendar: 2945
- British Regnal year: 43 Eliz. 2 – 44 Eliz. 2
- Buddhist calendar: 2539
- Burmese calendar: 1357
- Byzantine calendar: 7503–7504
- Chinese calendar: 甲戌年 (Wood Dog); 4692 or 4485 — to — 乙亥年 (Wood Pig); 4693 or 4486
- Coptic calendar: 1711–1712
- Discordian calendar: 3161
- Ethiopian calendar: 1987–1988
- Hebrew calendar: 5755–5756
- Hindu calendars
- Vikram Samvat: 2051–2052
- Shaka Samvat: 1916–1917
- Kali Yuga: 5095–5096
- Holocene calendar: 11995
- Igbo calendar: 995–996
- Iranian calendar: 1373–1374
- Islamic calendar: 1415–1416
- Japanese calendar: Heisei 7 (平成７年)
- Javanese calendar: 1927–1928
- Juche calendar: 84
- Julian calendar: Gregorian minus 13 days
- Korean calendar: 4328
- Minguo calendar: ROC 84 民國84年
- Nanakshahi calendar: 527
- Thai solar calendar: 2538
- Tibetan calendar: ཤིང་ཕོ་ཁྱི་ལོ་ (male Wood-Dog); 2121 or 1740 or 968 — to — ཤིང་མོ་ཕག་ལོ་ (female Wood-Boar); 2122 or 1741 or 969
- Unix time: 788918400 – 820454399

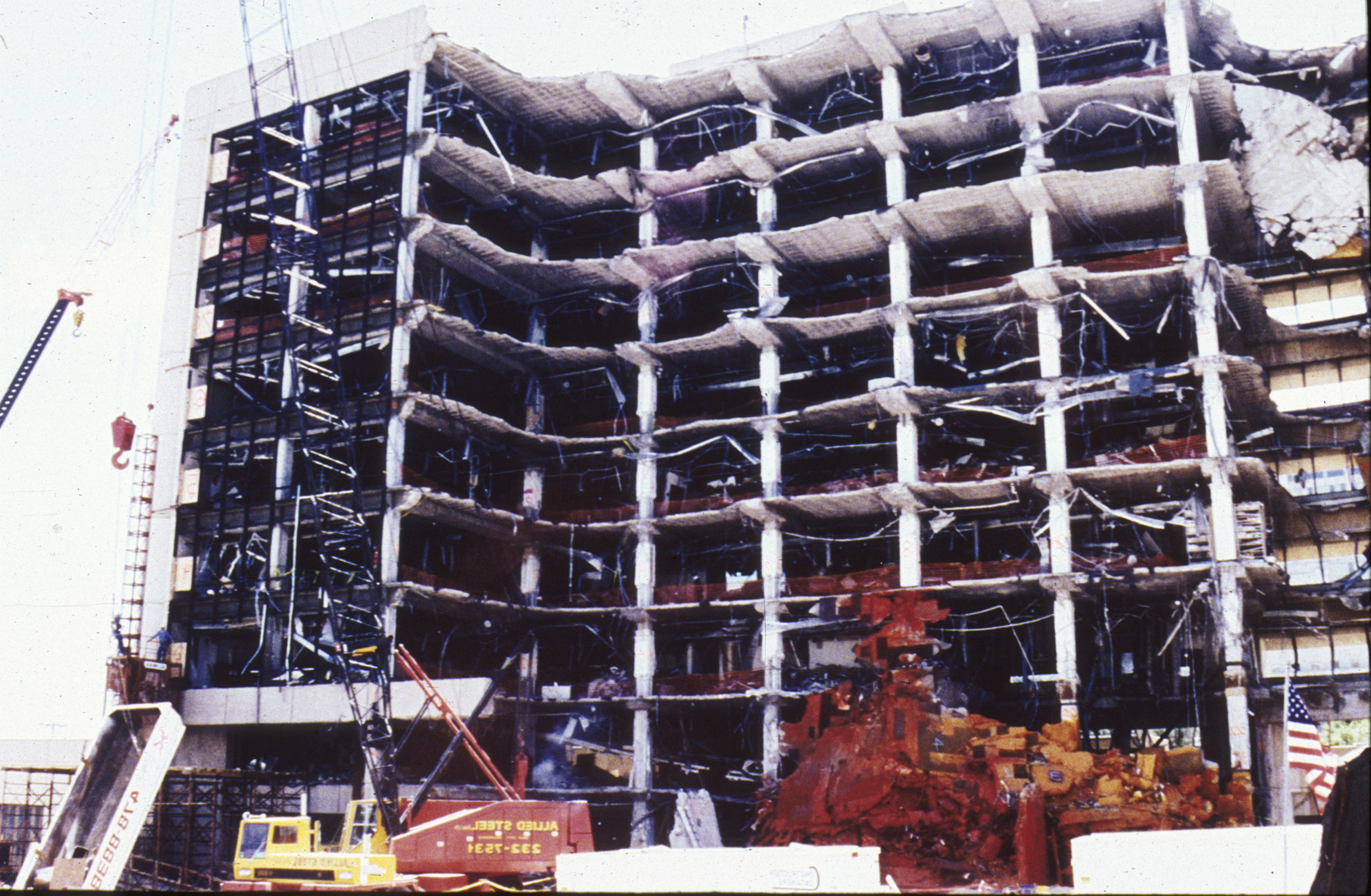
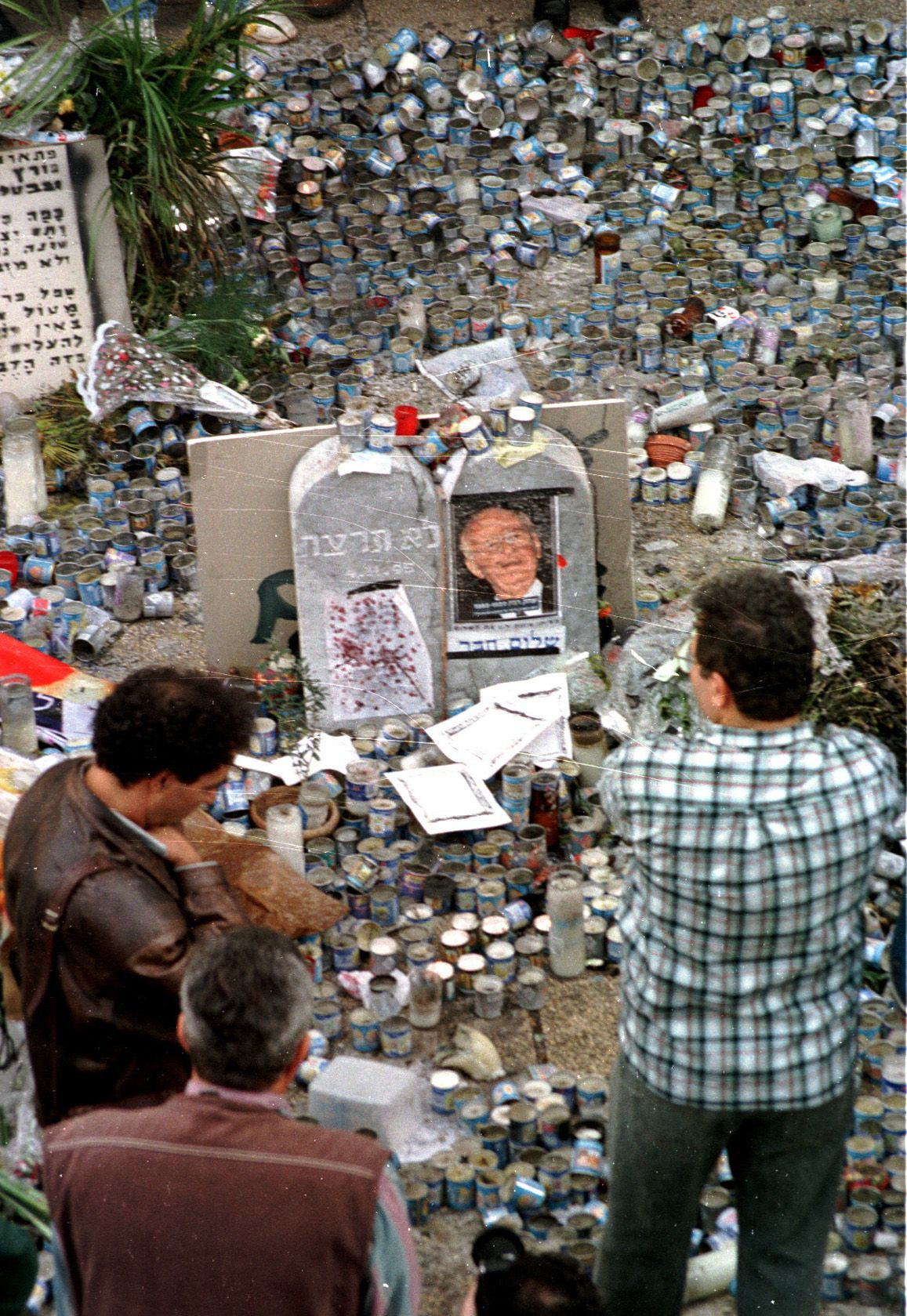
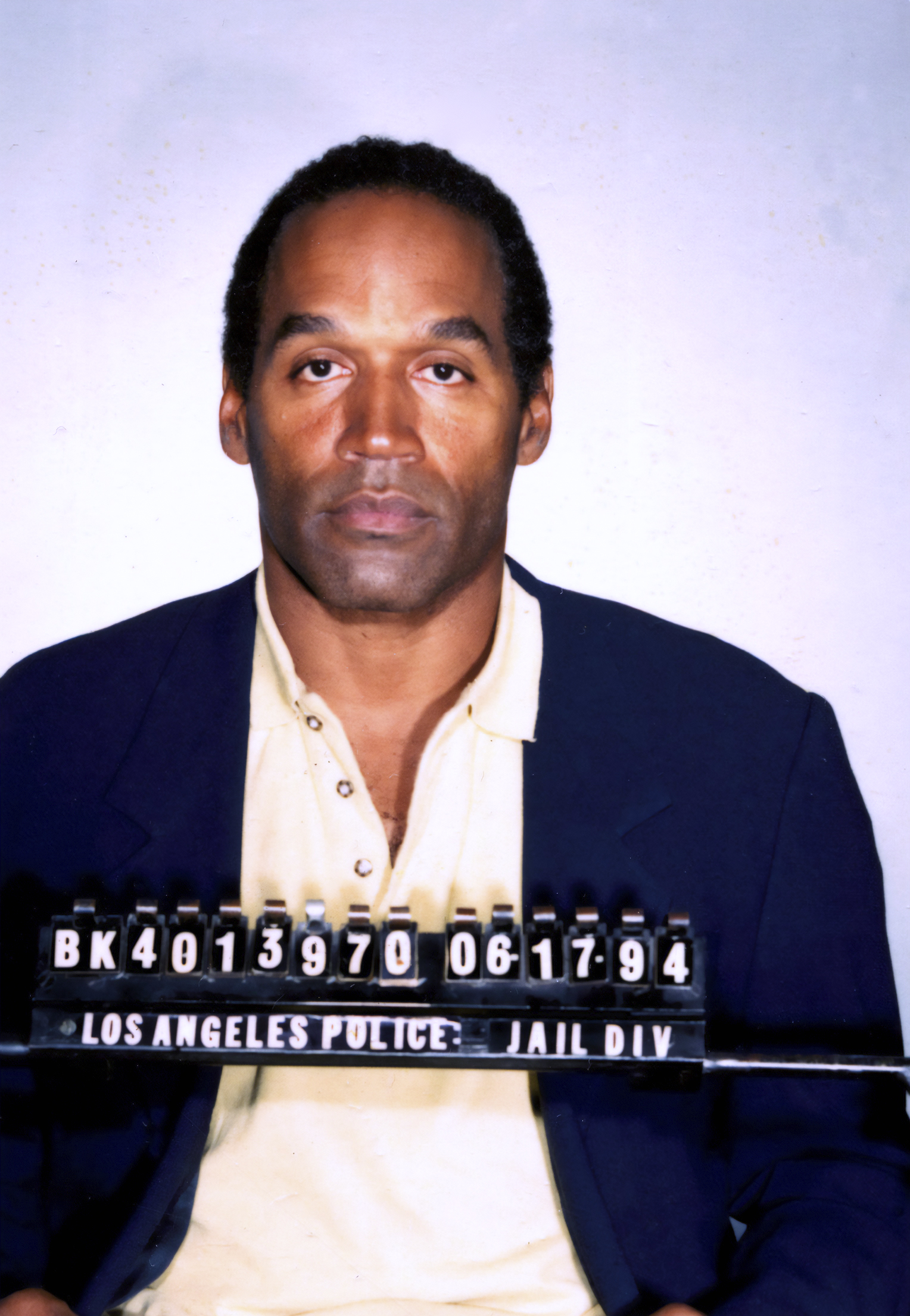
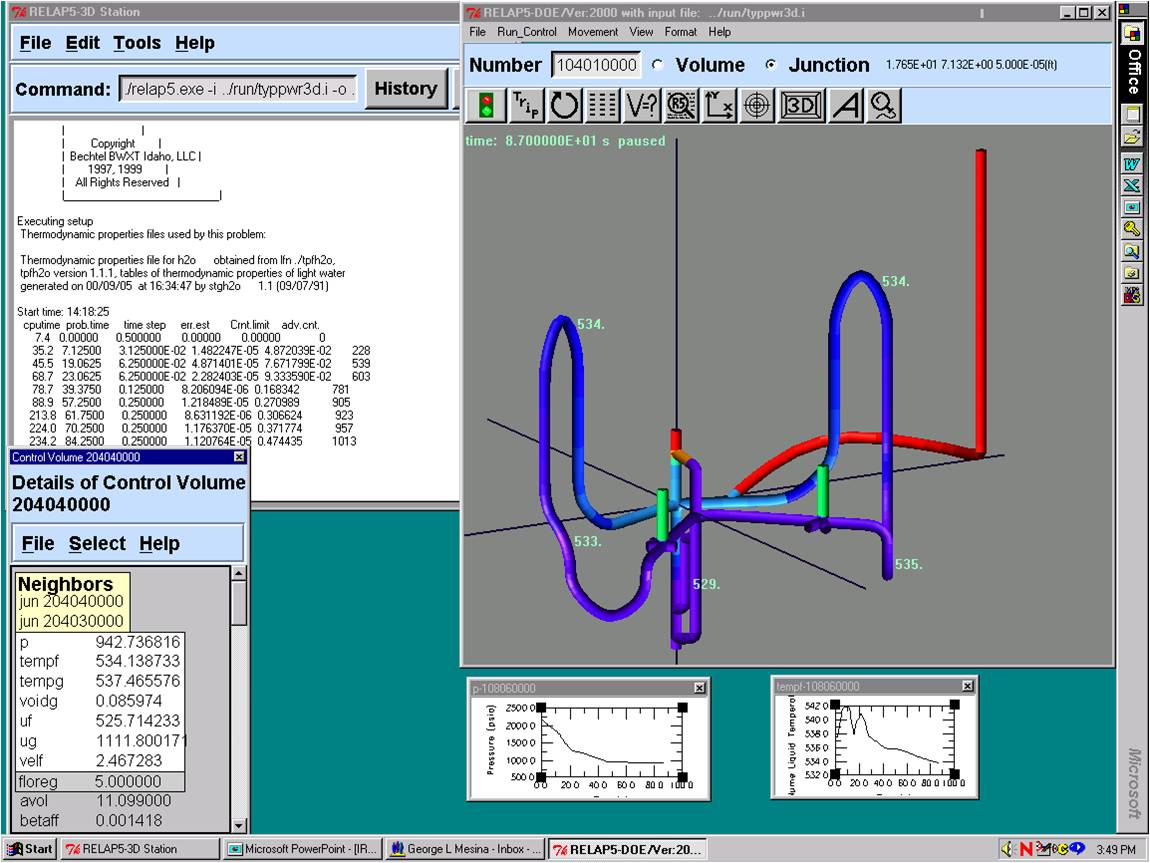
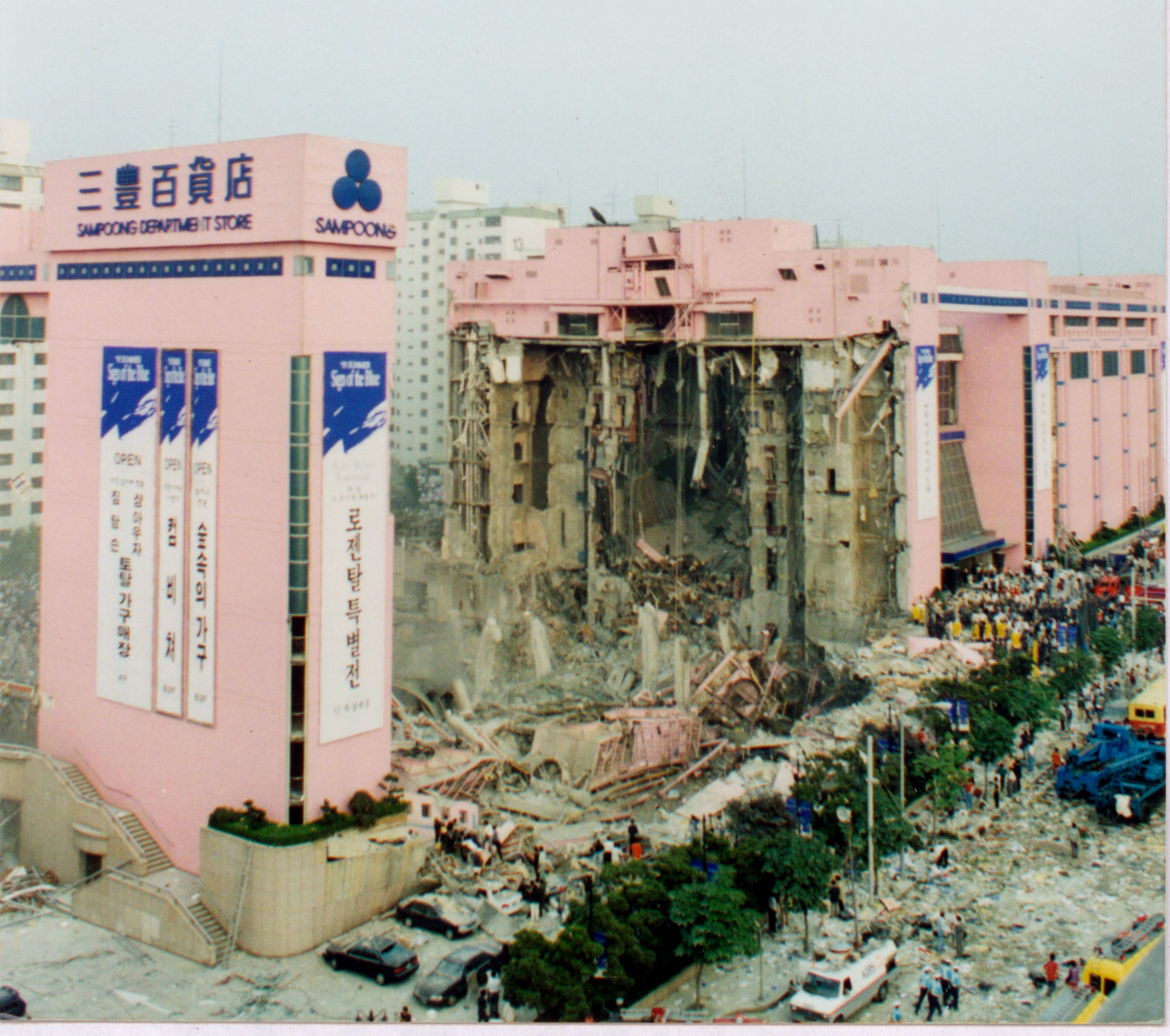
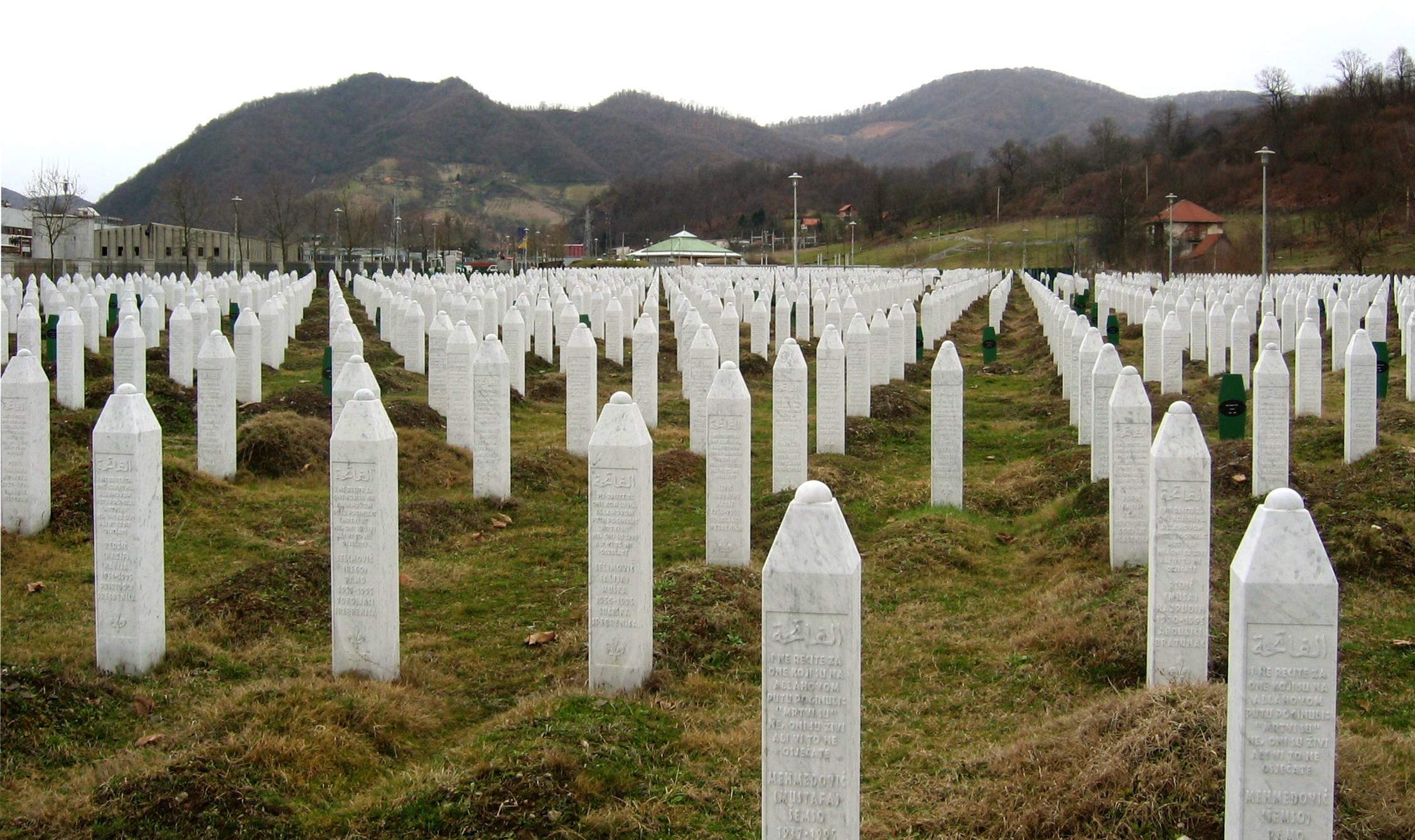
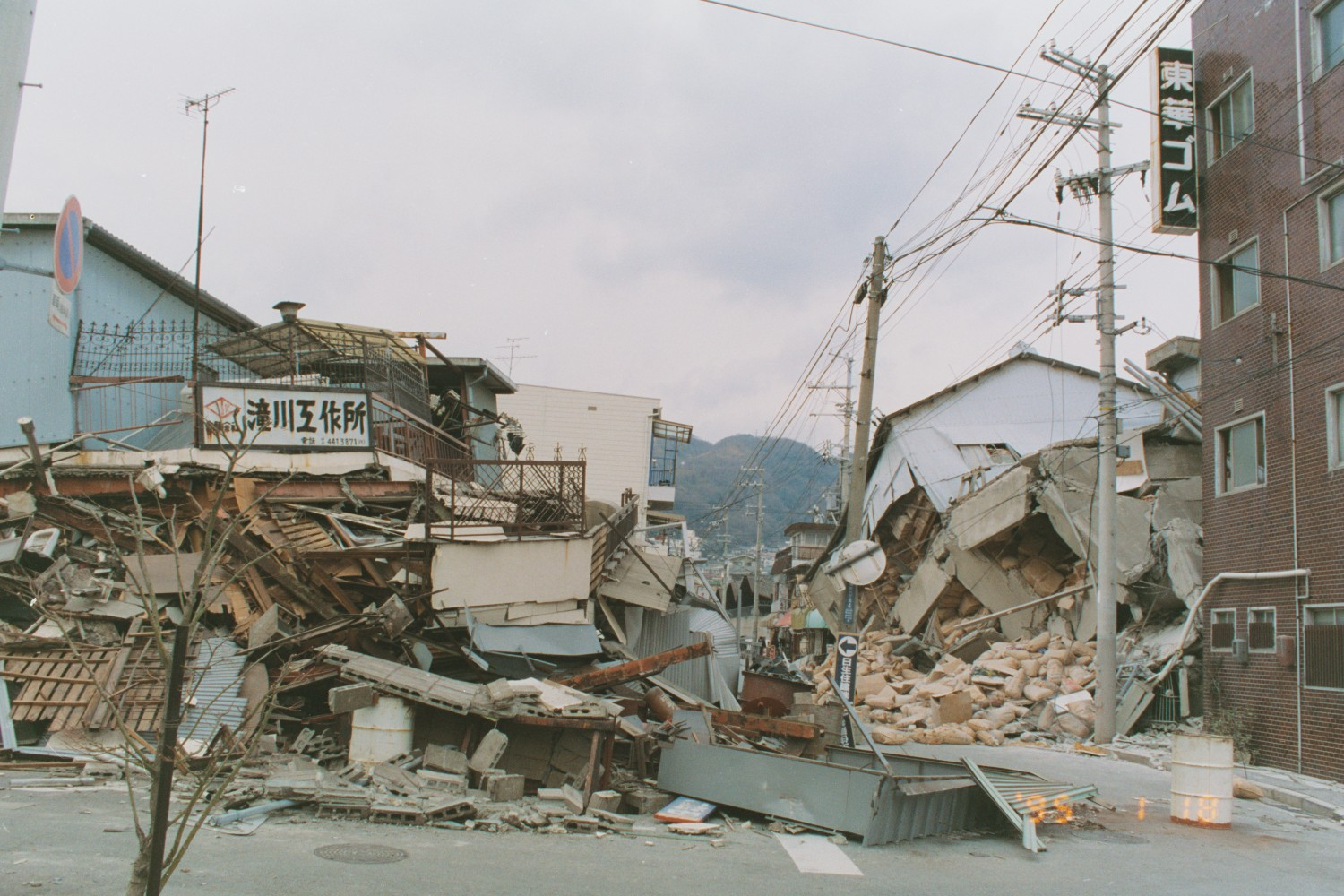
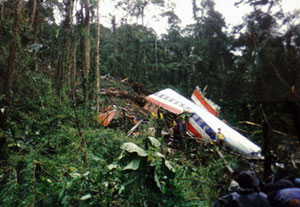
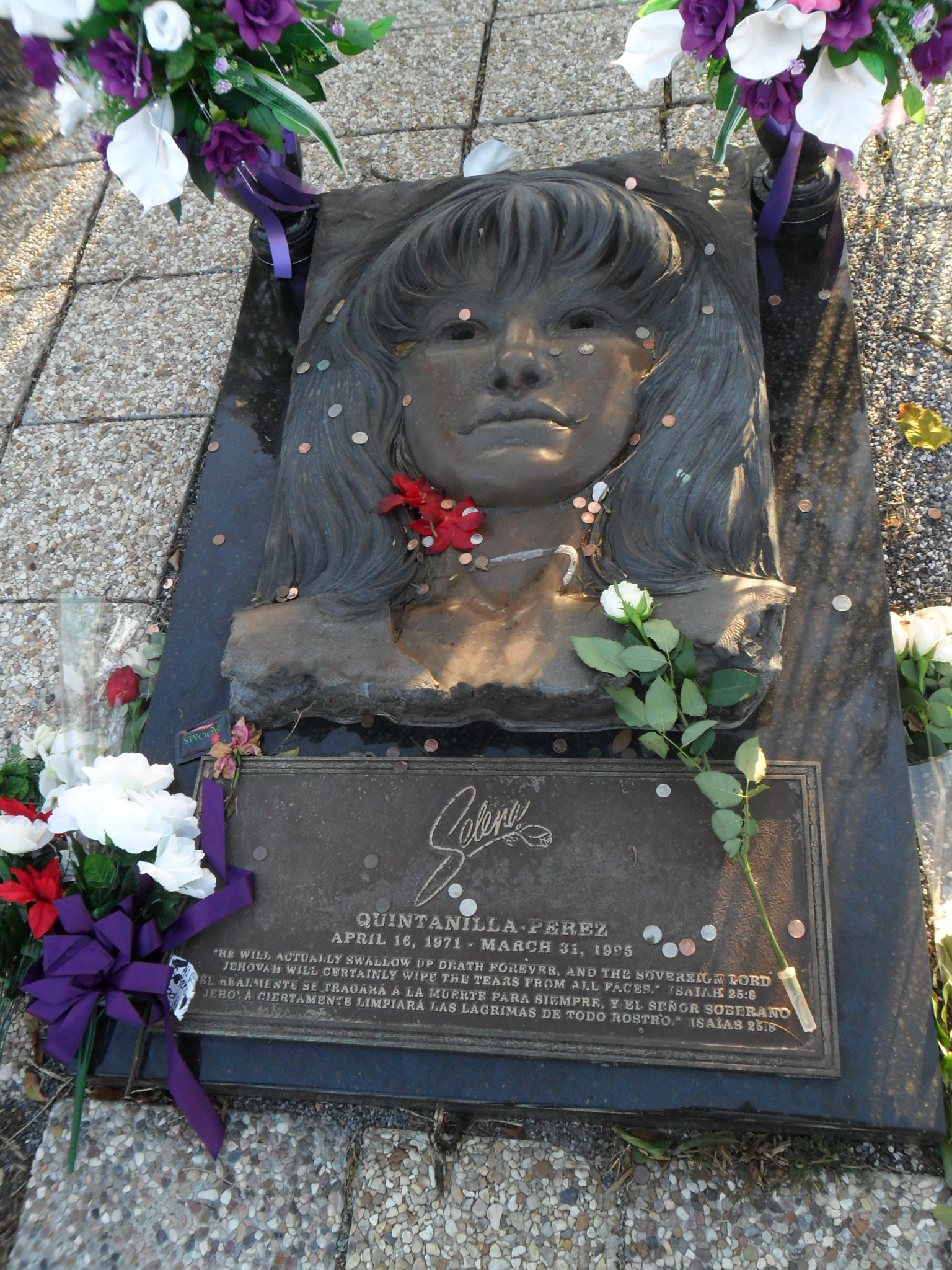
From top to bottom, left to right: The Oklahoma City bombing kills 168 people, the deadliest act of domestic terrorism in U.S. history; Israeli Prime Minister Yitzhak Rabin is assassinated at a peace rally in Tel Aviv; O. J. Simpson is found not guilty of murder; Windows 95 is released by Microsoft; the Sampoong Department Store collapse in Seoul kills over 500 people; the Srebrenica massacre takes place during the Bosnian War; the Great Hanshin earthquake strikes Kobe, Japan, killing over 6,000 people; American Airlines Flight 965 crashes into a mountain near Cali, Colombia, killing 151 people; and Tejano singer Selena is murdered by the president of her fan club, Yolanda Saldívar.

1995 (MCMXCV) was a common year starting on Sunday of the Gregorian calendar, the 1995th year of the Common Era (CE) and Anno Domini (AD) designations, the 995th year of the 2nd millennium, the 95th year of the 20th century, and the 6th year of the 1990s decade.

1995 was designated as:

- United Nations Year for Tolerance
- World Year of Peoples' Commemoration of the Victims of the Second World War

This was the first year that the Internet was entirely privatized, with the United States government no longer providing public funding, marking the beginning of the Information Age. America Online and Prodigy offered access to the World Wide Web system for the first time this year, releasing browsers that made it easily accessible to the general public.

== Events ==
=== January ===
- January 1
  - The World Trade Organization (WTO) is established to replace the General Agreement on Tariffs and Trade (GATT).
  - Austria, Finland and Sweden join the European Union.
- January 9 – Valeri Polyakov completes 366 days in space while aboard the Mir space station, breaking a duration record.
- January 10–15 – The World Youth Day 1995 festival is held in Manila, Philippines, culminating in 5 million people gathering for John Paul II's concluding mass in Quirino Grandstand.
- January 17 – The 6.9 Great Hanshin earthquake strikes the southern Hyōgo Prefecture of Japan with a maximum Shindo of 7, leaving 5,502–6,434 people dead, and 251,301–310,000 displaced.
- January 25 – Norwegian rocket incident: A rocket launched from the space exploration centre at Andøya, Norway, is briefly interpreted by the Russians as an incoming attack.
- January 31 – Mexican peso crisis: U.S. President Bill Clinton invokes emergency powers to extend a $20 billion loan to help Mexico avert financial collapse.

=== February ===
- February 13 – Twenty-one Bosnian Serb commanders are charged with genocide and crimes against humanity in the United Nations' International Criminal Tribunal for the former Yugoslavia, a tribunal on human rights violations during the Wars in the Balkans.
- February 21 – Steve Fossett lands in Leader, Saskatchewan, Canada, becoming the first person to make a solo flight across the Pacific Ocean in a balloon.
- February 25 – The Amazon Cooperation Treaty Organization (ACTO) (Organización del Tratado de Cooperación Amazónica [OTCA]) is formed.
- February 26 – The United Kingdom's oldest investment banking firm, Barings Bank, collapses after securities broker Nick Leeson loses $1.4 billion by speculating on the Tokyo Stock Exchange.

=== March ===
- March 1
  - Julio María Sanguinetti is sworn in as President of Uruguay for his second term.
  - Polish Prime Minister Waldemar Pawlak resigns from Parliament and is replaced by ex-communist Józef Oleksy.
- March 3 – United Nations Operation in Somalia II, the United Nations peacekeeping mission in Somalia, ends.
- March 14 – Astronaut Norman Thagard becomes the first American to ride into space aboard a Russian launch vehicle (the Soyuz TM-21), lifting off from the Baikonur Cosmodrome in Kazakhstan.
- March 20 – Members of the doomsday cult Aum Shinrikyo carry out the Tokyo subway sarin attack, killing 14 people and leading to over a thousand injured.
- March 22 – Cosmonaut Valeri Polyakov returns after setting a record for 438 days in outer space.
- March 26 – The Schengen Agreement, easing cross-border travel, goes into effect in several European countries.
- March 31
  - Murder of Selena: Tejano singer Selena Quintanilla-Pérez is shot and killed by her fan club president Yolanda Saldívar at a Days Inn in Corpus Christi, Texas.
  - TAROM Flight 371 from Bucharest to Brussels crashes shortly after takeoff, killing all 60 people on board.

=== April ===
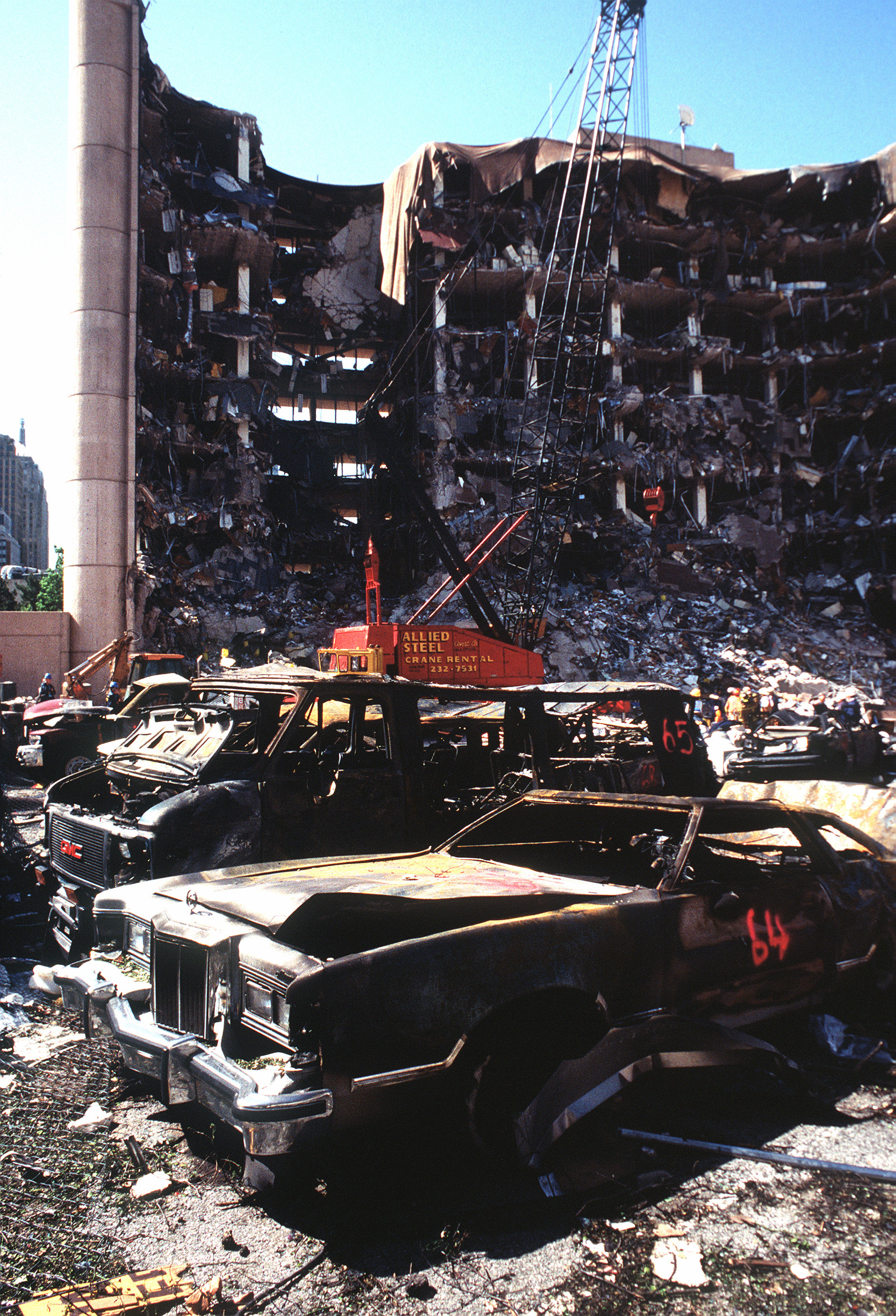
April 19: A car bomb explodes outside a Federal building in Oklahoma City, killing 168

- April 7 – First Chechen War: Samashki massacre – Russian paramilitary troops begin a massacre of at least 250 civilians in Samashki, Chechnya.
- April 19 – Oklahoma City bombing: 168 people, including eight federal Marshals and 19 children, are killed at the Alfred P. Murrah Federal Building and 680 are wounded by a bomb set off by Timothy McVeigh.
- April 30 – The United States government stops funding the NSFNET, making the Internet a wholly privatized system.

=== May ===
- May 7 – Jacques Chirac is elected president of France.
- May 10 – The Vaal Reefs mining disaster at Vaal Reefs gold mine in Orkney, South Africa. A runaway locomotive falls into a lift shaft onto an ascending cage and causes it to plunge 1,500 feet (460 m) to the bottom of the 6,900 feet (2,100 m) deep shaft, killing 104.
- May 11 – More than 170 countries agree to extend the Nuclear Nonproliferation Treaty indefinitely and without conditions.
- May 13 – The 6.6 M_{w} Western Macedonia earthquake strikes northwestern Greece with a maximum Mercalli intensity of VIII (Severe), injuring 25 and causing $450 million in damage.
- May 14 – The Dalai Lama proclaims 6-year-old Gedhun Choekyi Nyima as the 11th reincarnation of the Panchen Lama, but 3 days later the boy is detained by Chinese authorities and not seen again.
- May 16 – Following the Tokyo subway sarin attack two months earlier, Japanese police besiege the headquarters of Aum Shinrikyo near Mount Fuji and arrest cult leader Shoko Asahara. Further police operations result in over two hundred arrests and thirteen members of the cult, including Asahara, are sentenced to death.
- May 17 – 1995 San Diego tank rampage: In San Diego, Shawn Nelson steals an M60A3 tank from a local California Army National Guard armory and goes on a rampage for 25 minutes, damaging over $149,201 of property. The rampage ended when San Diego police forced the hatch open and fatally shot him.
- May 20 – English football team Everton win the FA Cup, beating reigning champions Manchester United with a score of 1 – 0. A goal at 30 minutes by Paul Rideout secured the win for Everton their first major trophy in 8 years and also constituted their last title ever since.
- May 25 – June 24 – The 1995 Rugby World Cup takes place in South Africa and is won by the host nation after beating New Zealand in the final; this was the Springboks tournament debut after World Rugby lifted their ban following the end of apartheid.
- May 28 – The 7.0 M_{w} Neftegorsk earthquake strikes northern Sakhalin Island in Russia with a maximum Mercalli intensity of IX (Violent), leaving 1,967 people dead and 750 injured.

=== June ===
- June 2
  - A United States Air Force F-16 piloted by Captain Scott O'Grady is shot down over Bosnia and Herzegovina while patrolling the NATO no-fly zone. O'Grady is rescued by U.S. Marines six days later.
  - Waffen-SS Hauptsturmführer Erich Priebke is extradited from Argentina to Italy.
- June 6
  - U.S. astronaut Norman Thagard breaks NASA's space endurance record of 14 days, 1 hour and 16 minutes, aboard the Russian space station Mir.
  - The Constitutional Court of South Africa abolishes capital punishment in South Africa in the case of S v Makwanyane and Another.
- June 13 – French President Jacques Chirac announces the resumption of nuclear tests in French Polynesia.
- June 16 – The IOC selects Salt Lake City to host the 2002 Winter Olympics.
- June 20 – Michael Jackson releases his double album HIStory: Past, Present and Future, Book I.
- June 22 – Japanese police rescue 365 hostages from a hijacked All Nippon Airways Flight 857 (Boeing 747-200) at Hakodate airport. The hijacker was armed with a knife and demanded the release of Shoko Asahara.
- June 29
  - STS-71: Space Shuttle Atlantis docks with the Russian Mir space station for the first time.
  - Sampoong Department Store collapse in the Seocho-gu district of Seoul, South Korea, kills 502 and injures 937.
  - Iraq disarmament crisis: According to UNSCOM, the unity of the U.N. Security Council begins to fray as a few countries, particularly France and Russia, become more interested in making financial deals with Iraq than in disarming the country.

=== July ===
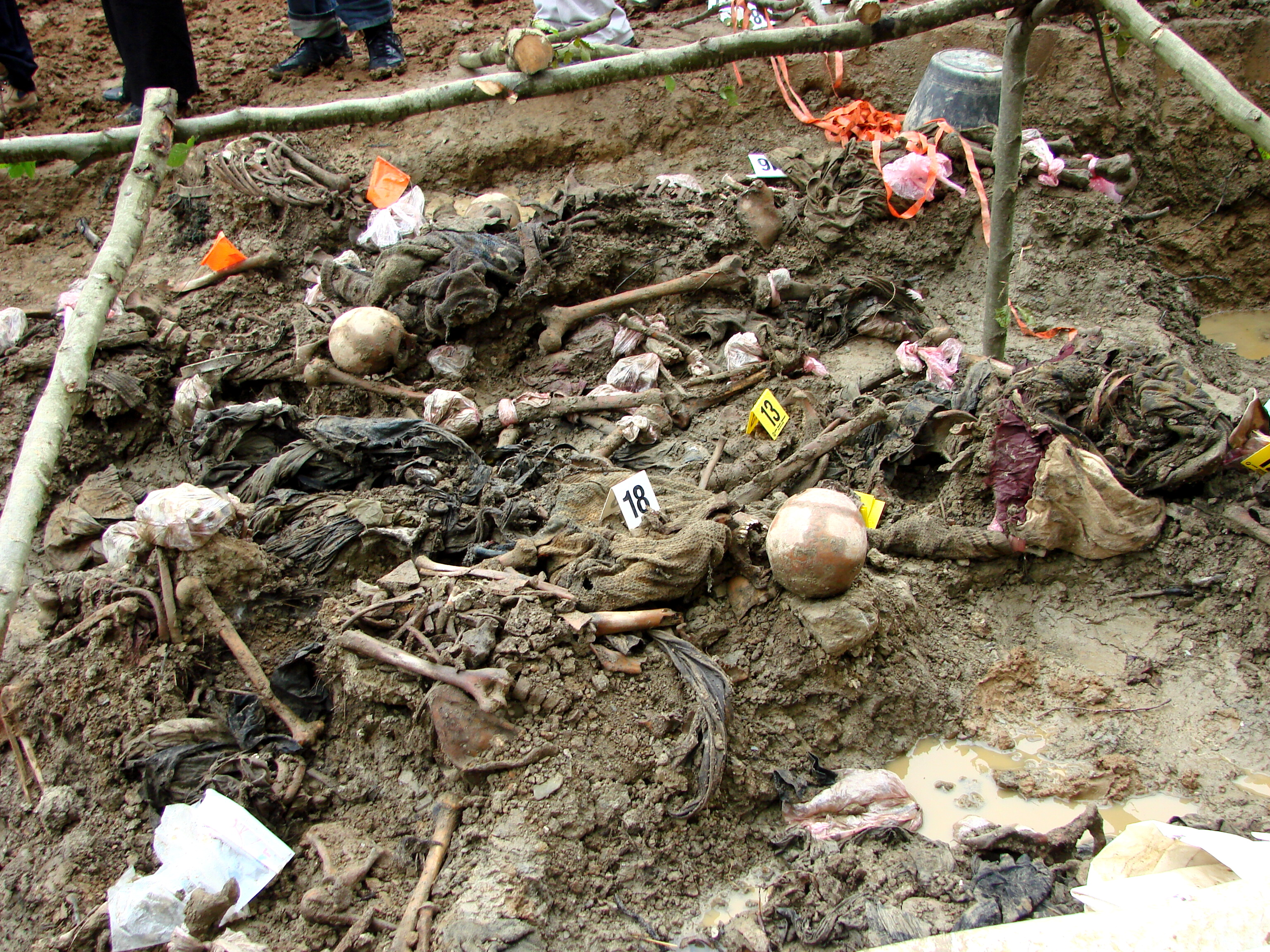
Exhumed grave of victims of the July Srebrenica massacre.

- July – Iraq disarmament crisis: Iraq threatens to end all cooperation with UNSCOM and IAEA if sanctions against the country are not lifted by August 31. Following the defection of his son-in-law, Hussein Kamel al-Majid, Saddam Hussein makes new revelations about the full extent of Iraq's biological and nuclear weapons programs. Iraq also withdraws its last U.N. declaration of prohibited biological weapons and turns over a large amount of new documents on its WMD programs.
- July 1 – Iraq disarmament crisis: In response to UNSCOM's evidence, Iraq admits for first time the existence of an offensive biological weapons program, but denies weaponization.
- July 4 – Prime Minister of the United Kingdom John Major is re-elected as leader of the Conservative Party, ending an internal challenge to his position.
- July 9 – Sri Lankan Civil War: 125 civilians are killed in Navaly as result of bombing by the Sri Lanka Air Force.
- July 10 – Burmese dissident Aung San Suu Kyi is freed from house arrest.
- July 11
  - Srebrenica massacre: Units of the Army of Republika Srpska, under the command of General Ratko Mladić, enter Srebrenica with little resistance from Dutch peacekeepers of the United Nations Protection Force, going on to kill thousands of Bosniak men and boys and rape many women.
  - President Clinton announces the restoration of United States–Vietnam relations twenty years after the Vietnam War.
  - A Cubana de Aviación Antonov An-24 crashes into the Caribbean off southeast Cuba killing 44 people.

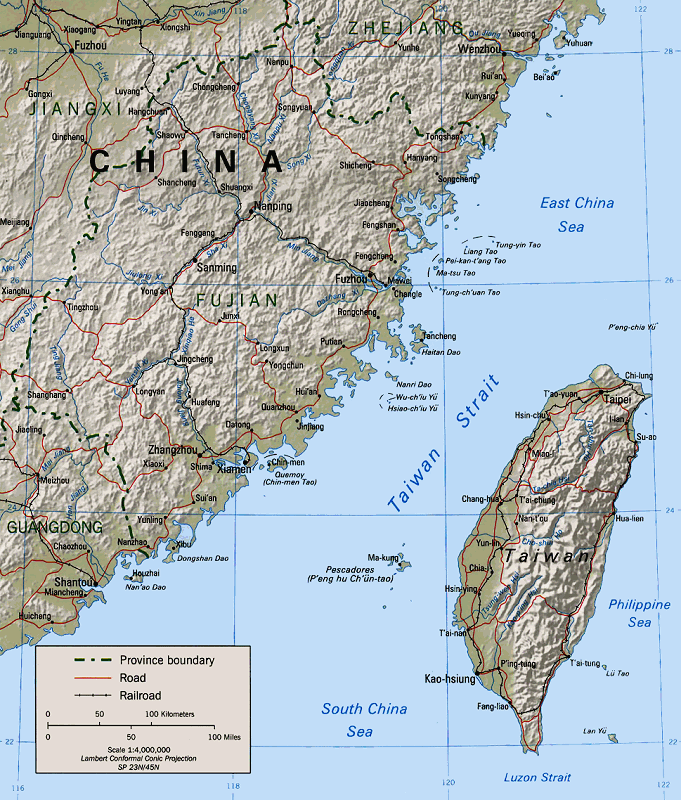
The Taiwan Strait

- July 21–26 – Third Taiwan Strait Crisis: The Chinese People's Liberation Army fires missiles into the waters north of Taiwan.

=== August ===
- August – The International Rugby Football Board declares that rugby union players may be professional.
- August 4 – Croatian forces, with the cooperation of the ARBiH, launch Operation Storm against rebel forces of the Republic of Serbian Krajina, which subsequently ceases to exist as a political entity.
- August 7 – The Chilean government declares a state of emergency in the southern half of the country in response to an event of intense cold, wind, rain and snowfall known as the White Earthquake.
- August 14 – Nepali Prime Minister Man Mohan Adhikari along with seven other high-ranking officials survives a helicopter crash.
- August 24 – Microsoft releases Windows 95 to the public.
- August 29 – Eduard Shevardnadze, the Georgian head of state, survives an assassination attempt in Tbilisi.
- August 30 – Operation Deliberate Force, the NATO bombing campaign against Bosnian Serb artillery positions, begins in Bosnia and Herzegovina, continuing into September. At the same time, ARBiH forces begin an offensive against the Bosnian Serb Army around Sarajevo, central Bosnia and Bosnian Krajina.

=== September ===
- September – The European Parliament elects the first European Ombudsman, Jacob Söderman, who takes up office this month.
- September 4–15 – The Fourth World Conference on Women in Beijing with over 4,750 delegates from 181 countries in attendance.
- September 19 – The Washington Post and The New York Times publish the Unabomber Manifesto.
- September 26 – The trial against former Italian Prime Minister Giulio Andreotti, who is accused of Mafia connections, begins.
- September 27–28 – Bob Denard's mercenaries capture President Said Mohamed Djohar of the Comoros; the local army does not resist.

=== October ===
- October 3 – Murder trial of O. J. Simpson: Former American football star O. J. Simpson is found not guilty of double murder in a criminal trial for the deaths of former wife Nicole Brown Simpson and her friend Ronald Goldman.
- October 5 – Tansu Çiller of DYP forms the new government of Turkey (51st government), a minority government which lasts for less than a month.
- October 6 – Michel Mayor and Didier Queloz announce the discovery of 51 Pegasi b, the first confirmed extrasolar planet orbiting an ordinary main-sequence star.
- October 9 – 1995 Palo Verde, Arizona, derailment An Amtrak Sunset Limited train derails through sabotage at a trestle near Palo Verde, Arizona, United States, resulting in one death.
- October 16 – The Million Man March is held in Washington, D.C. The event was conceived by Nation of Islam leader Louis Farrakhan.
- October 24 – A total solar eclipse is visible from Iran, India, Thailand and Southeast Asia.
- October 26 – An avalanche hits the village Flateyri in Iceland, killing 20 people, the second of two deadly avalanches to occur in Iceland during this calendar year.
- October 28 – A fire in Baku Metro, Azerbaijan, kills 289 passengers, becoming the world's worst subway disaster.
- October 30
  - Quebec independentists narrowly lose a referendum for a mandate to negotiate independence from Canada.
  - Tansu Çiller of DYP forms the new government (52nd government) of Turkey.

=== November ===
- November – The Indian government officially renames the city of Bombay, restoring the name Mumbai.
- November 1
  - The last signal is received from NASA's Pioneer 11 spacecraft.
  - Participants in the Yugoslav Wars begin negotiations at the Wright-Patterson Air Force Base in Dayton, Ohio.
- November 2 – The Supreme Court of Argentina orders the extradition of ex-S.S. captain Erich Priebke.
- November 4 – Israeli Prime Minister Yitzhak Rabin is assassinated at a peace rally in Tel Aviv.
- November 7 – Typhoon Angela leaves the Philippines and Vietnam devastated, with 882 deaths and US$315 million in damage. The typhoon is the strongest to strike the Philippines in 25 years, with wind speeds of 130 mph (210 km/h) and gusts of 180 mph (290 km/h).
- November 12 – The Millbrook Commonwealth Action Programme, a programme to implement the Harare Declaration, is announced by the Commonwealth Heads of Government.
- November 16 – A United Nations tribunal charges Radovan Karadžić and Ratko Mladić with genocide during the Bosnian War.
- November 20 – A car bomb explosion outside the Egyptian Embassy in Islamabad, Pakistan destroys the façade of the building, killing at least 13 people and wounding dozens more.
- November 21 – The Dayton Agreement to end the Bosnian War is reached at Wright-Patterson Air Force Base near Dayton, Ohio, United States (signed December 14).
- November 22
  - The 7.3 M_{w} Gulf of Aqaba earthquake shakes the Sinai Peninsula and Saudi Arabia region with a maximum Mercalli intensity of VIII (Severe), killing eight and injuring 30, and generating a non-destructive tsunami.
  - Toy Story, the first entirely computer-animated feature film, was released in theaters.
- November 28 – Twenty-seven nations sign the Barcelona Treaty, creating the Union for the Mediterranean.

=== December ===
- December 3 – Strikes paralyze France's public sector.
- December 6 – The United States Food and Drug Administration approves Saquinavir, the first protease inhibitor to treat HIV/AIDS. Within 2 years of its approval, annual deaths from AIDS in the United States fall from over 50,000 to approximately 18,000.
- December 7 – NASA's Galileo probe enters Jupiter's atmosphere.
- December 8 – Five-year-old Gyaincain Norbu is enthroned as the 11th reincarnation of the Panchen Lama at Tashilhunpo Monastery.
- December 14 – The Dayton Agreement is signed in Paris, officially ending the Bosnian War.
- December 16 – Iraq disarmament crisis: Iraqi scuba divers, under the direction of the United Nations Special Commission, dredge the Tigris near Baghdad. The divers find over 200 prohibited Russian-made missile instruments and components.
- December 20
  - American Airlines Flight 965 (Boeing 757) crashes into a mountain near Buga, Valle del Cauca, Colombia, killing 160 of the 164 on board.
  - NATO begins peacekeeping in Bosnia.
- December 23 – Dabwali fire accident: The Rajiv Marriage Palace catches fire in Haryana, India, killing 442 persons.
- December 30 – The lowest ever United Kingdom temperature of −27.2 °C (−17.0 °F) is recorded at Altnaharra in the Scottish Highlands. This equals the record set at Braemar, Aberdeenshire in 1895 and 1982.

=== Date unknown ===
- Sudden oak death, the tree disease caused by the plant pathogen Phytophthora ramorum, is first observed, in California, United States.
- The first SampTA conference for mathematicians, engineers and applied scientists is held in Riga, Latvia.

=== World population ===
World population
	1995	1990		2000	
World	5,674,380,000	5,263,593,000	410,787,000	6,070,581,000	396,201,000
Africa	707,462,000	622,443,000	85,019,000	795,671,000	88,209,000
Asia	3,430,052,000	3,167,807,000	262,245,000	3,679,737,000	249,685,000
Europe	725,405,000	721,582,000	5,823,000	730,986,000	5,581,000
Latin America & Caribbean	481,099,000	441,525,000	39,574,000	520,229,000	39,130,000
Northern America	299,438,000	283,549,000	15,889,000	315,915,000	16,477,000
Oceania	28,924,000	26,687,000	2,237,000	31,043,000	2,119,000

== Births ==
=== January ===
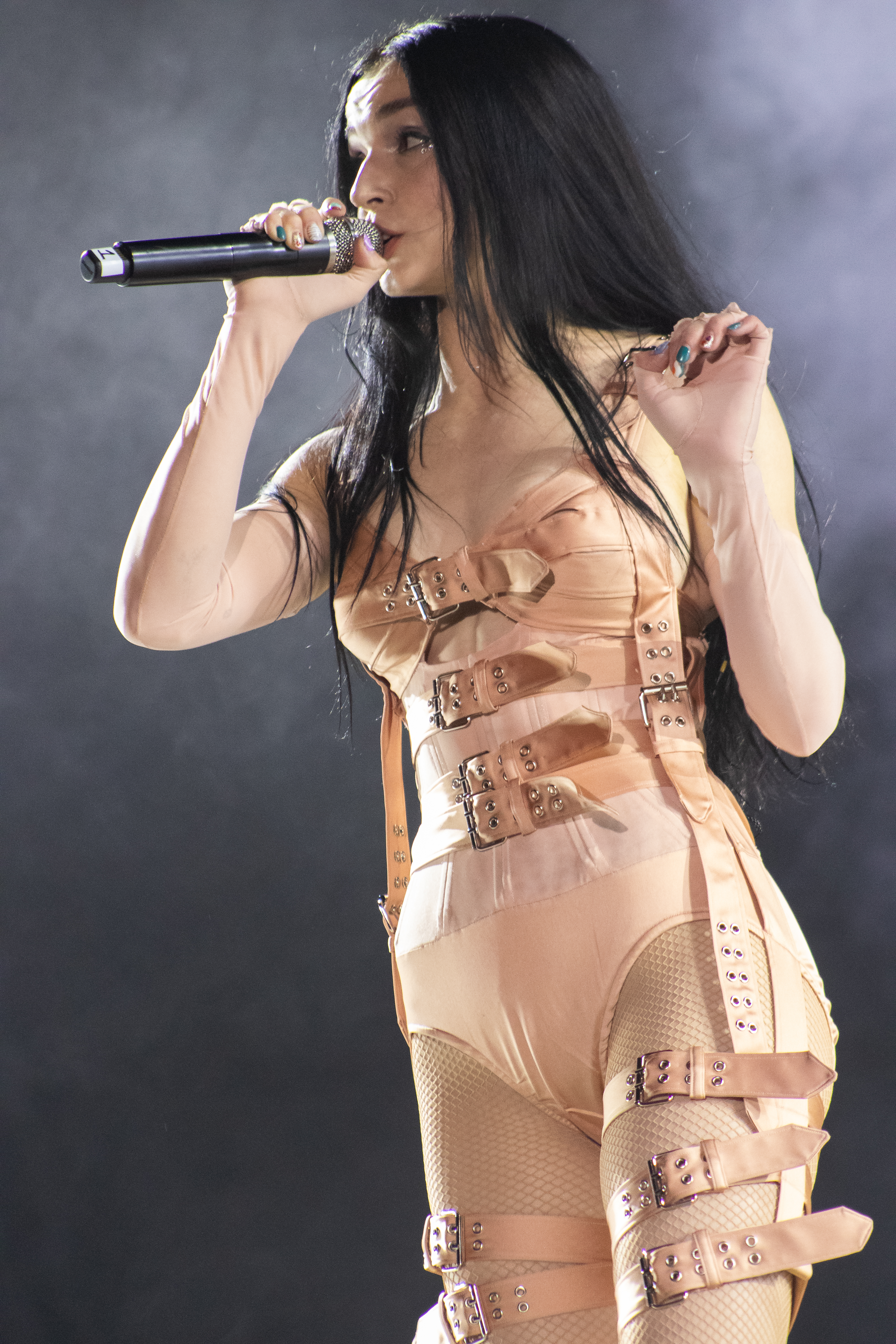
Poppy

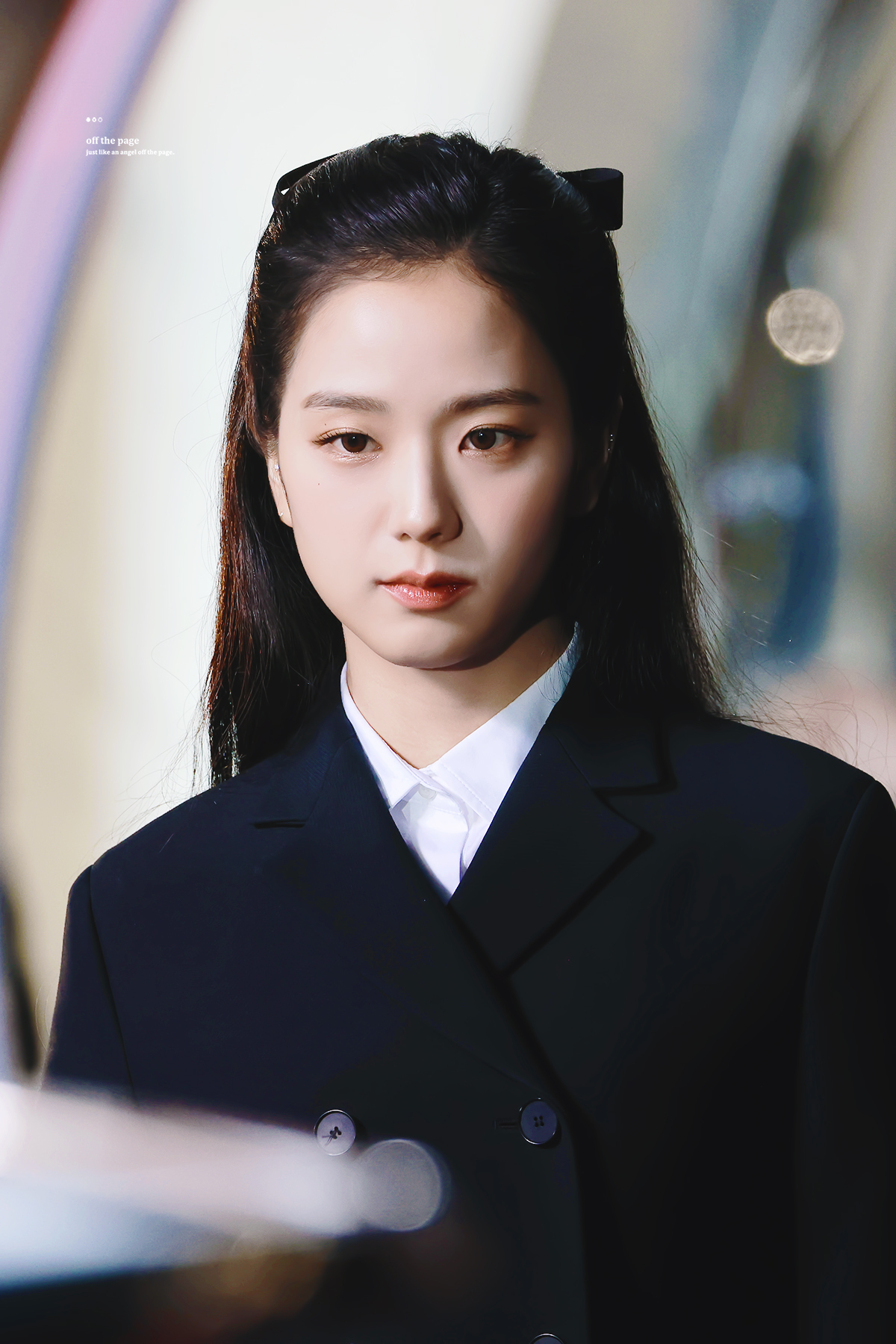
Jisoo

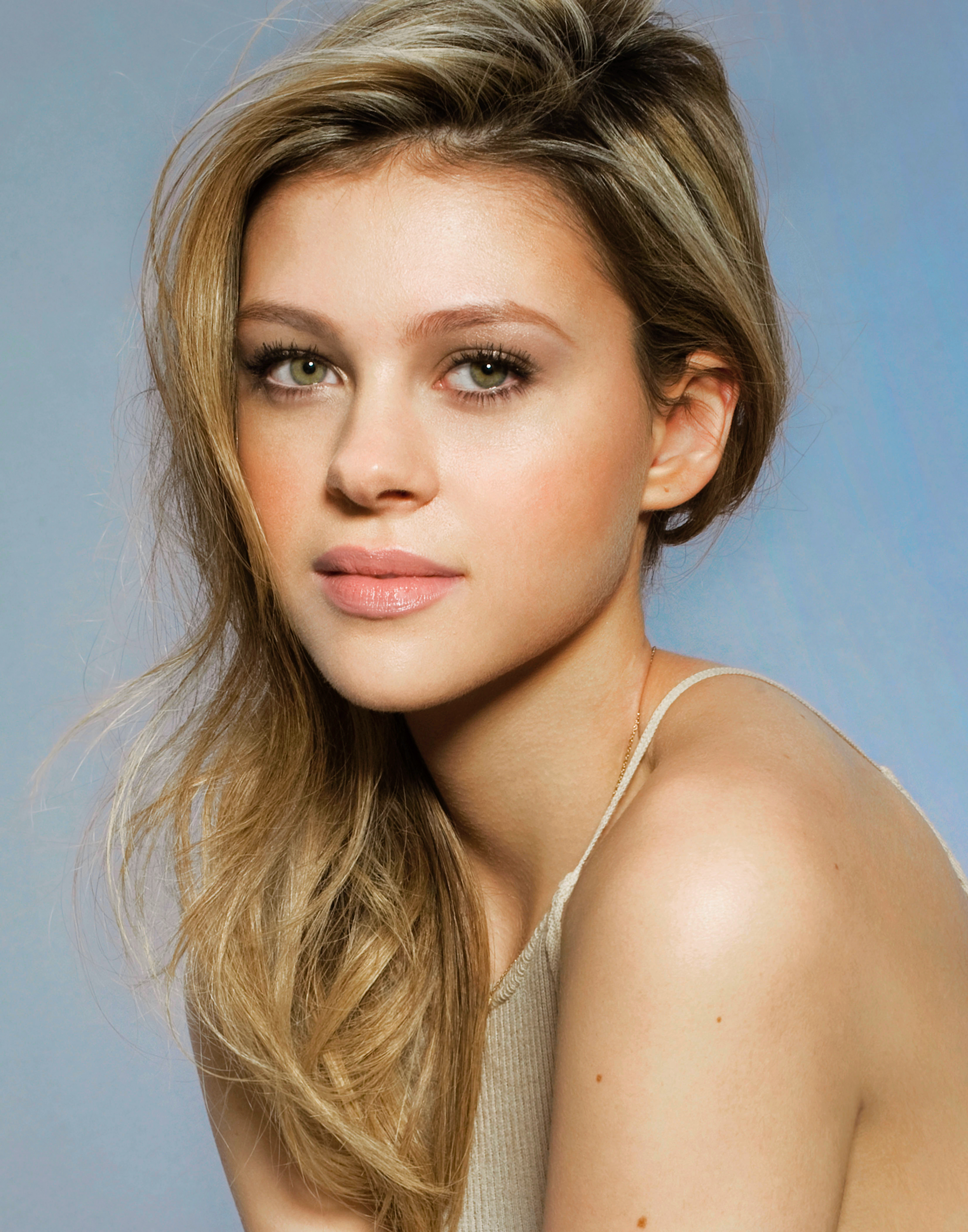
Nicola Peltz

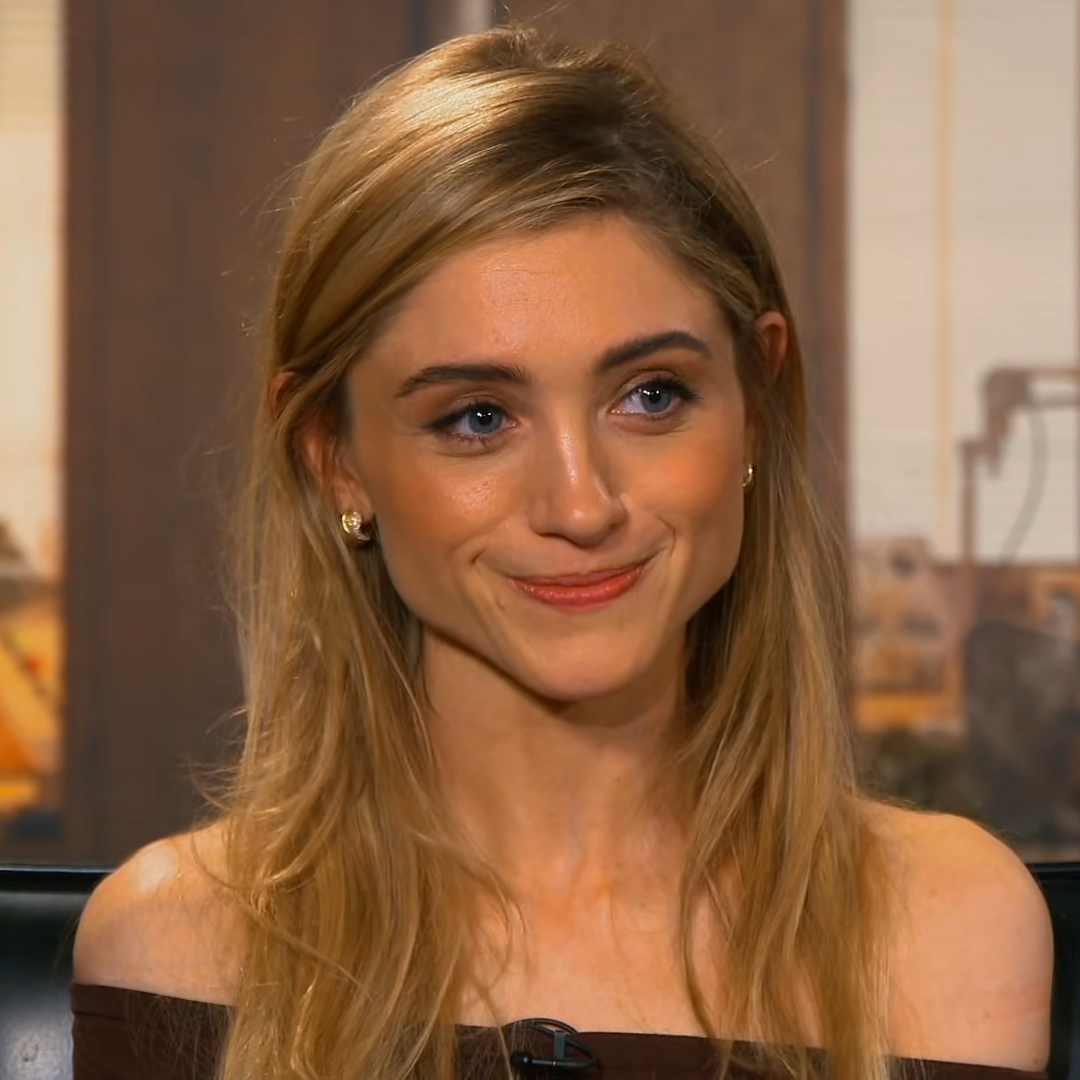
Natalia Dyer

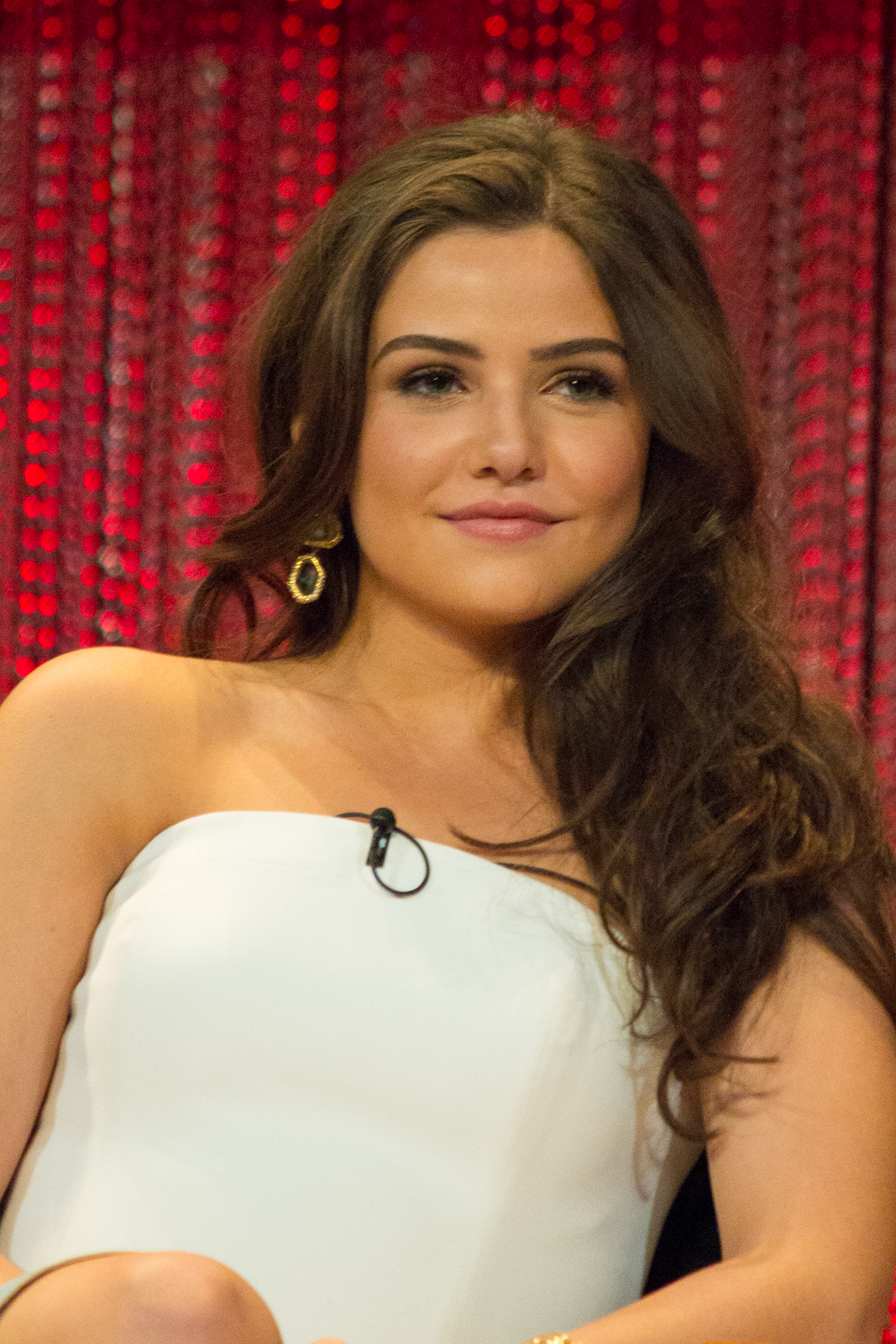
Danielle Campbell

- January 1
  - Sardar Azmoun, Iranian footballer
  - Poppy, American musician and model
- January 2
  - Giorgi Aburjania, Georgian footballer
  - Renata Notni, Mexican actress
- January 3
  - Jisoo, South Korean singer, actress, and model
- January 4 – María Isabel, Spanish singer
- January 6 – Michaela DePrince, Sierra Leonean-American ballet dancer (d. 2024)
- January 9 – Nicola Peltz, American actress
- January 12
  - Allisha Gray, American basketball player
  - Alessio Romagnoli, Italian footballer
  - Maverick Viñales, Spanish motorcycle racer
- January 19
  - Mathieu van der Poel, Dutch bicycle racer
  - Maxi Rolón, Argentine footballer (d. 2022)
- January 20
  - Joey Badass, American rapper
  - José María Giménez, Uruguayan footballer
- January 21 – Marine Johannès, French basketball player
- January 24 – Callan McAuliffe, Australian actor
- January 25 – Laura Nunnink, Dutch field hockey player
- January 30
  - Danielle Campbell, American actress
  - Viktoria Komova, Russian artistic gymnast
- January 31 – Nina Sublatti, Georgian singer and model

=== February ===
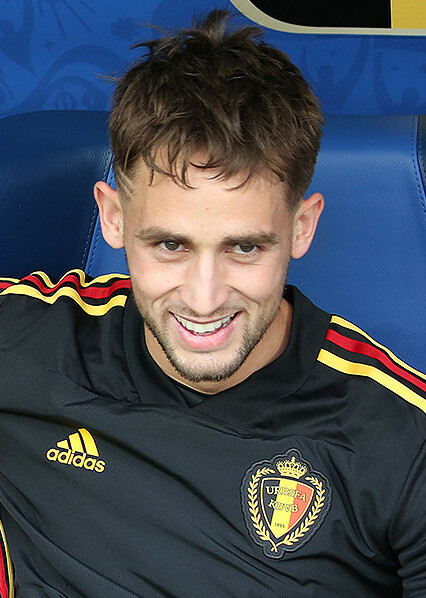
Adnan Januzaj

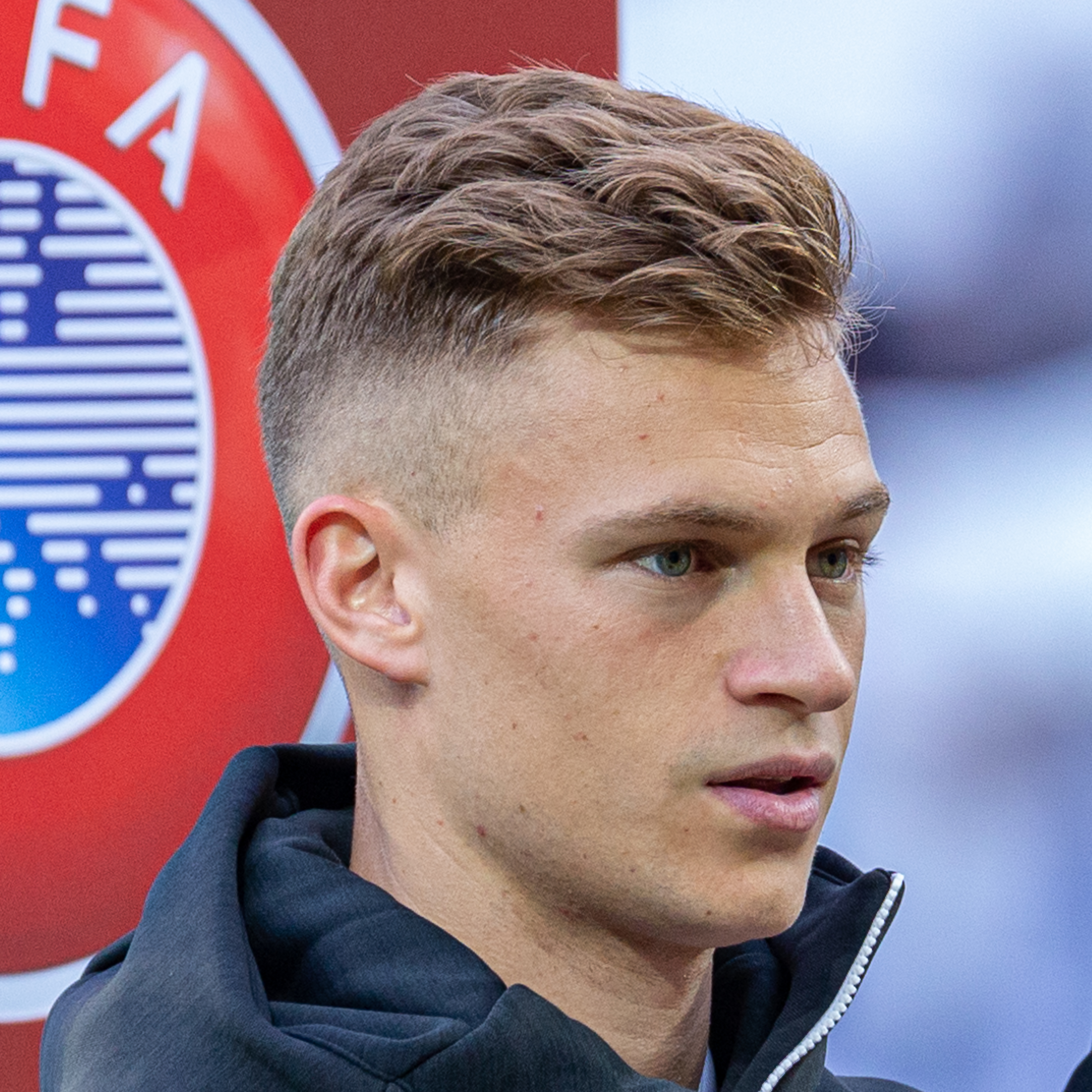
Joshua Kimmich

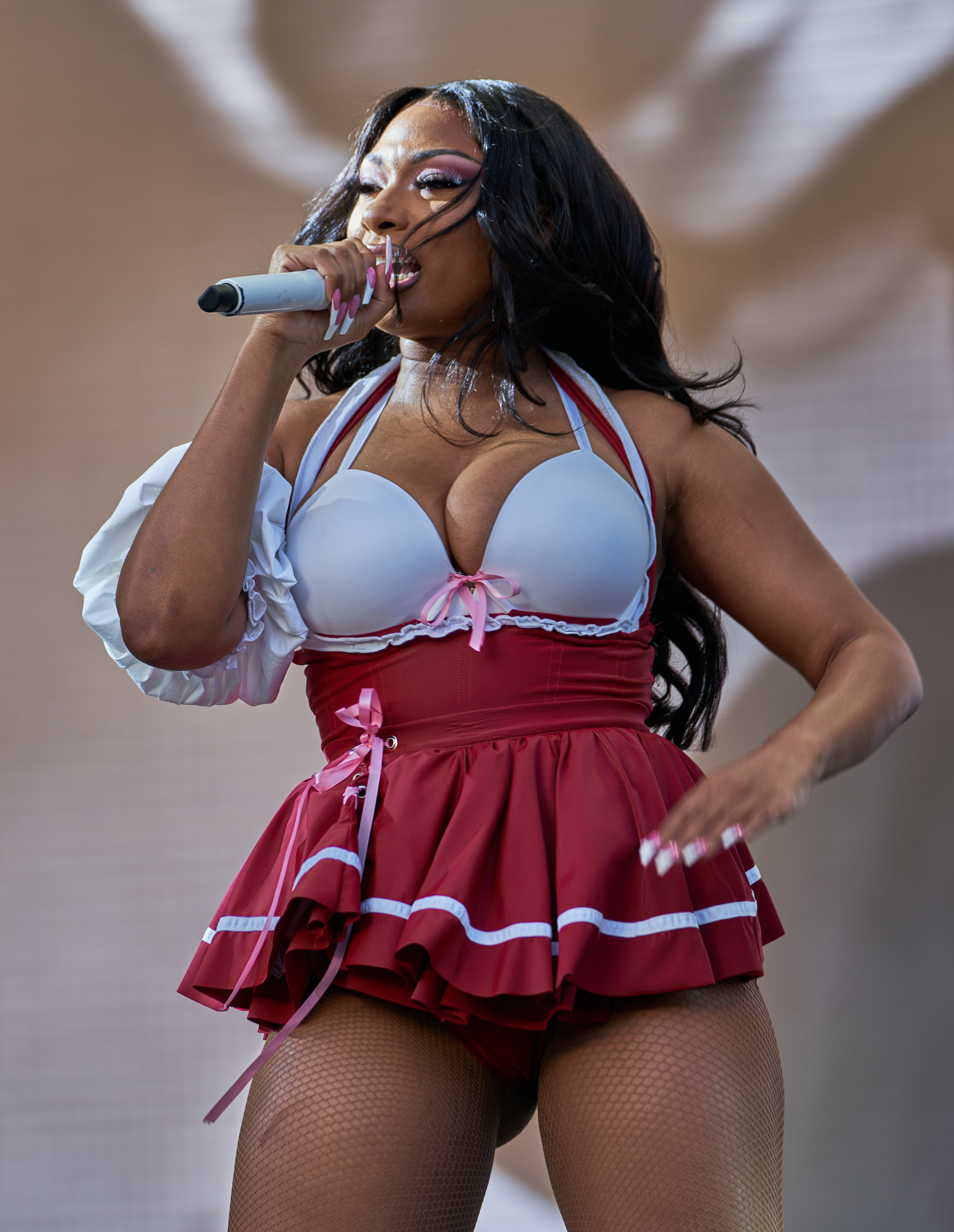
Megan Thee Stallion

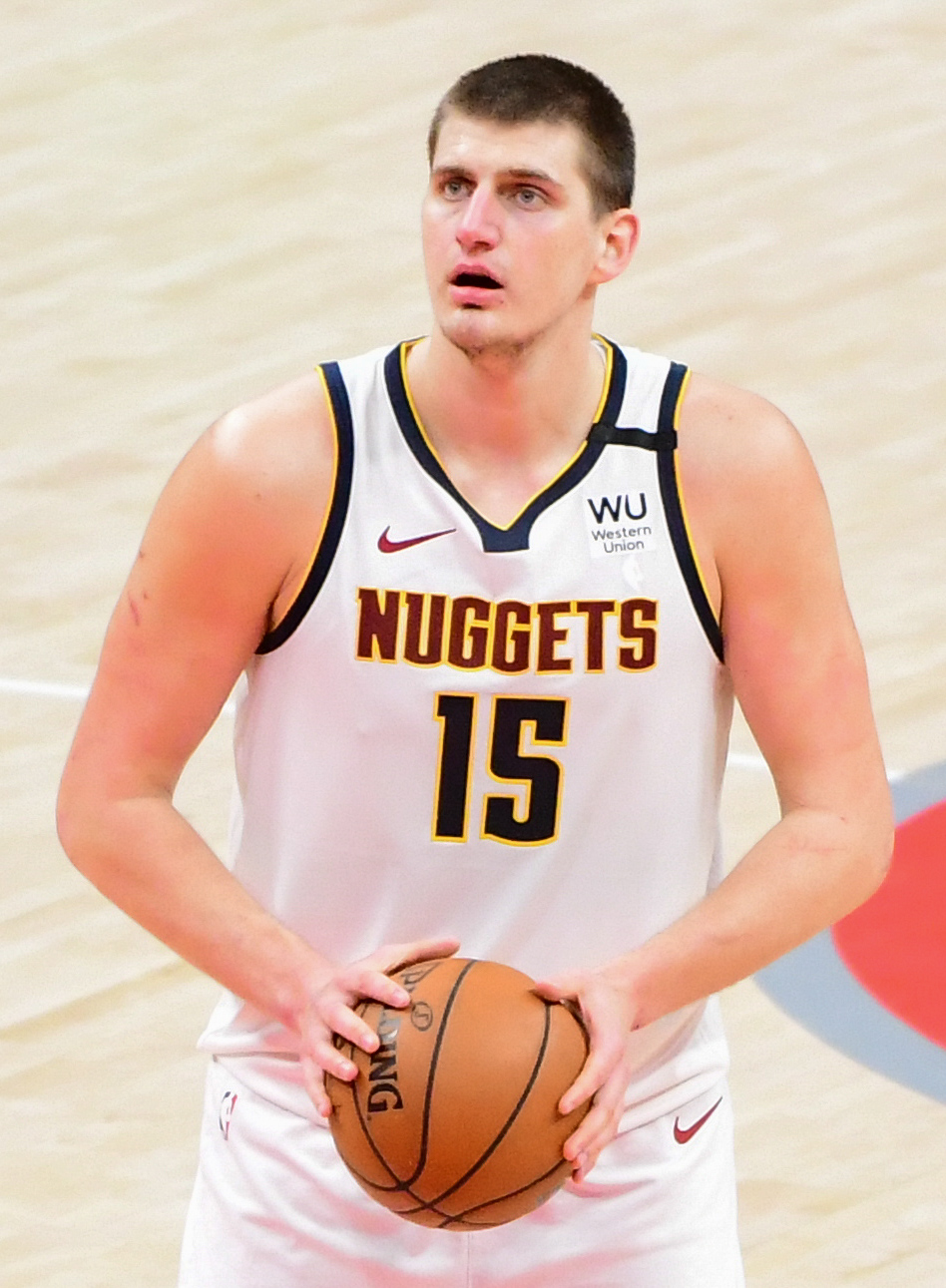
Nikola Jokić

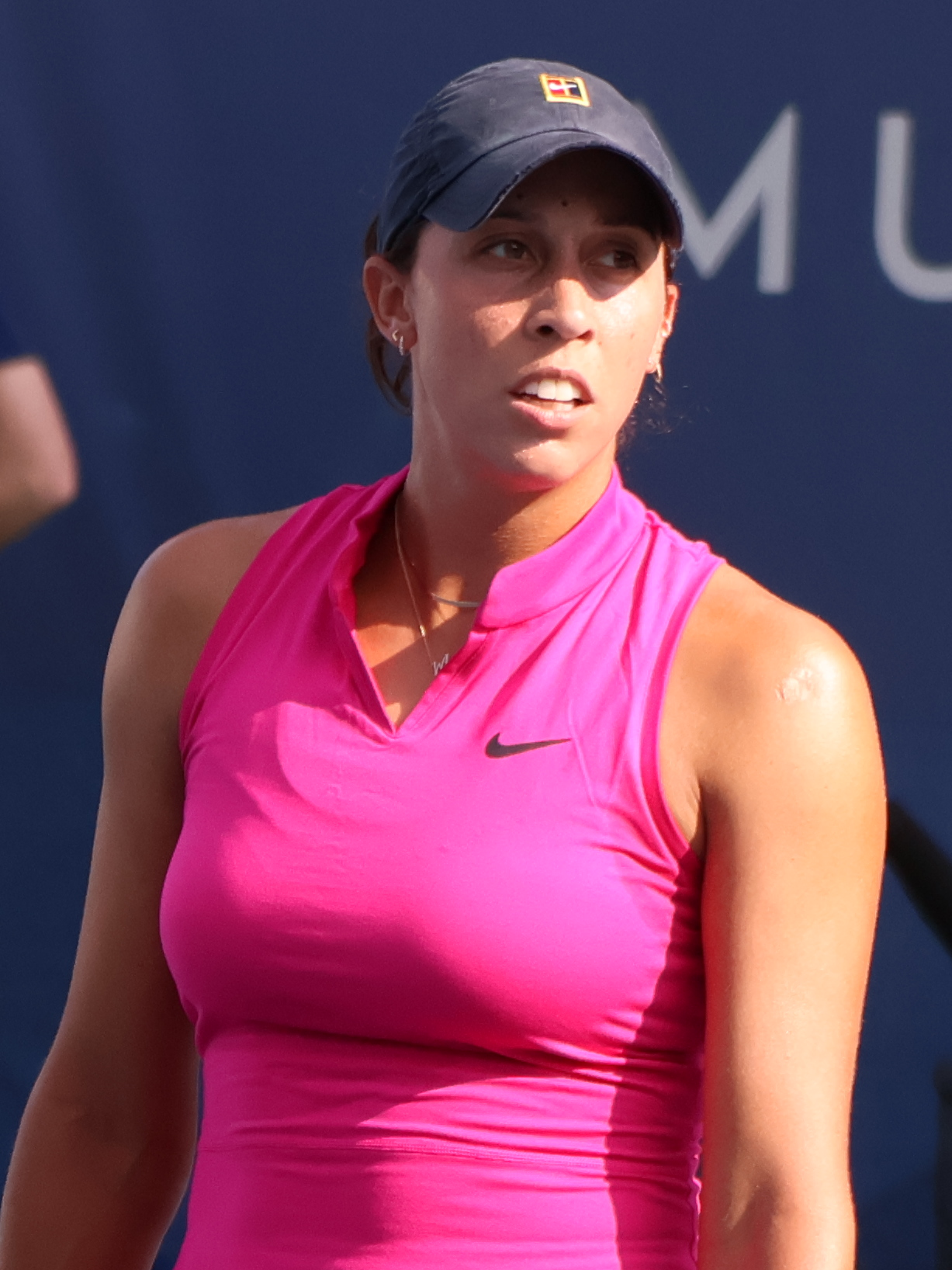
Madison Keys

- February 3 – Tao Tsuchiya, Japanese actress
- February 4 – Pione Sisto, South Sudanese-Danish footballer
- February 5 – Adnan Januzaj, Belgian footballer
- February 6
  - Leon Goretzka, German footballer
  - Nyck de Vries, Dutch racing driver
- February 8 – Joshua Kimmich, German footballer
- February 9 – Mario Pašalić, Croatian footballer
- February 10 – Naby Keïta, Guinean footballer
- February 11
  - Milan Škriniar, Slovak footballer
  - Yang Zhaoxuan, Chinese tennis player
- February 15 – Megan Thee Stallion, American rapper and YouTube personality
- February 17 – Madison Keys, American tennis player
- February 18 – Mikhail Kolyada, Russian figure skater
- February 23
  - Valarie Allman, American discus thrower
  - Andrew Wiggins, Canadian basketball player
- February 27 – Sergej Milinković-Savić, Serbian footballer
- February 28 – Lauren Carlini, American volleyball player

=== March ===
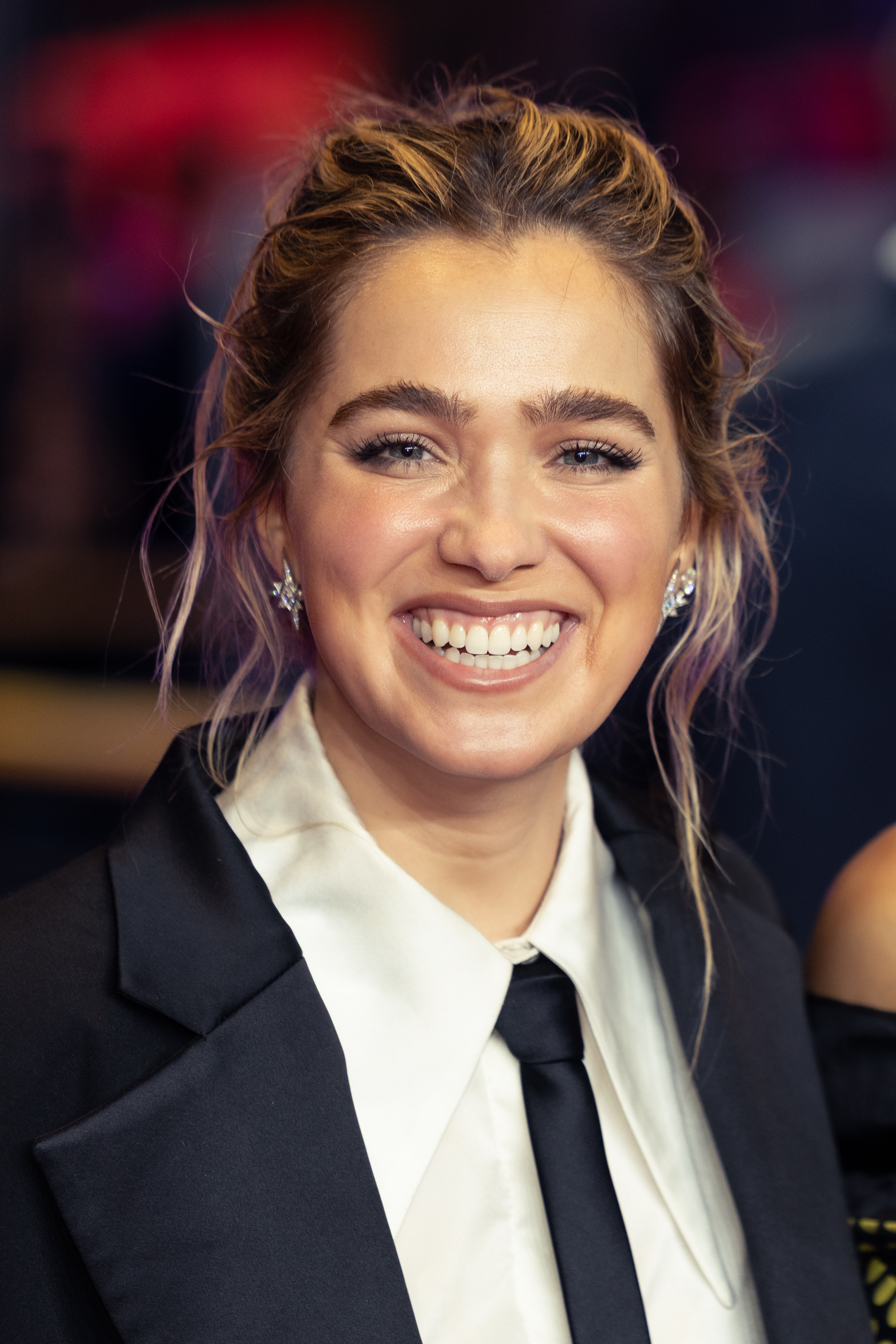
Haley Lu Richardson

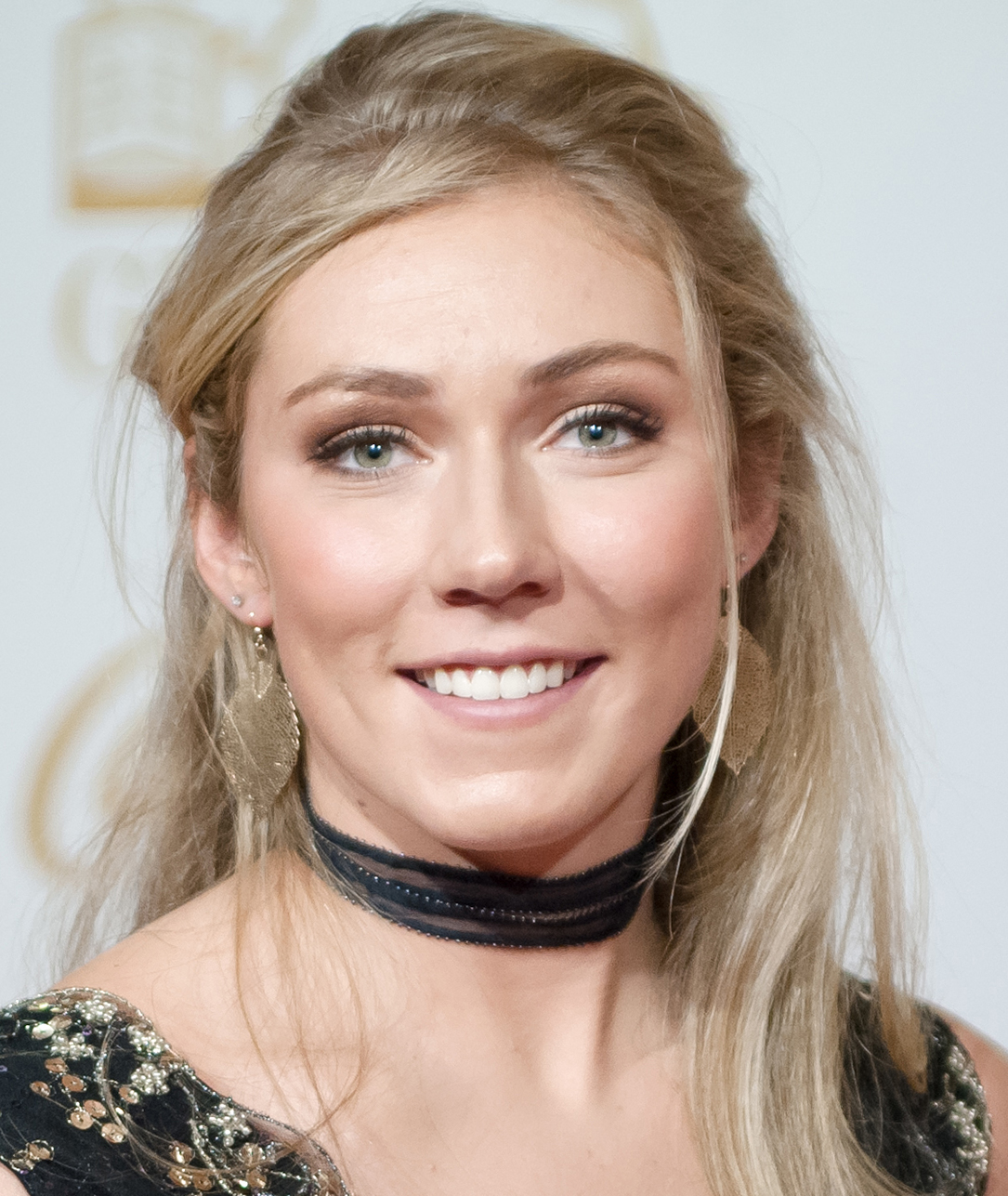
Mikaela Shiffrin

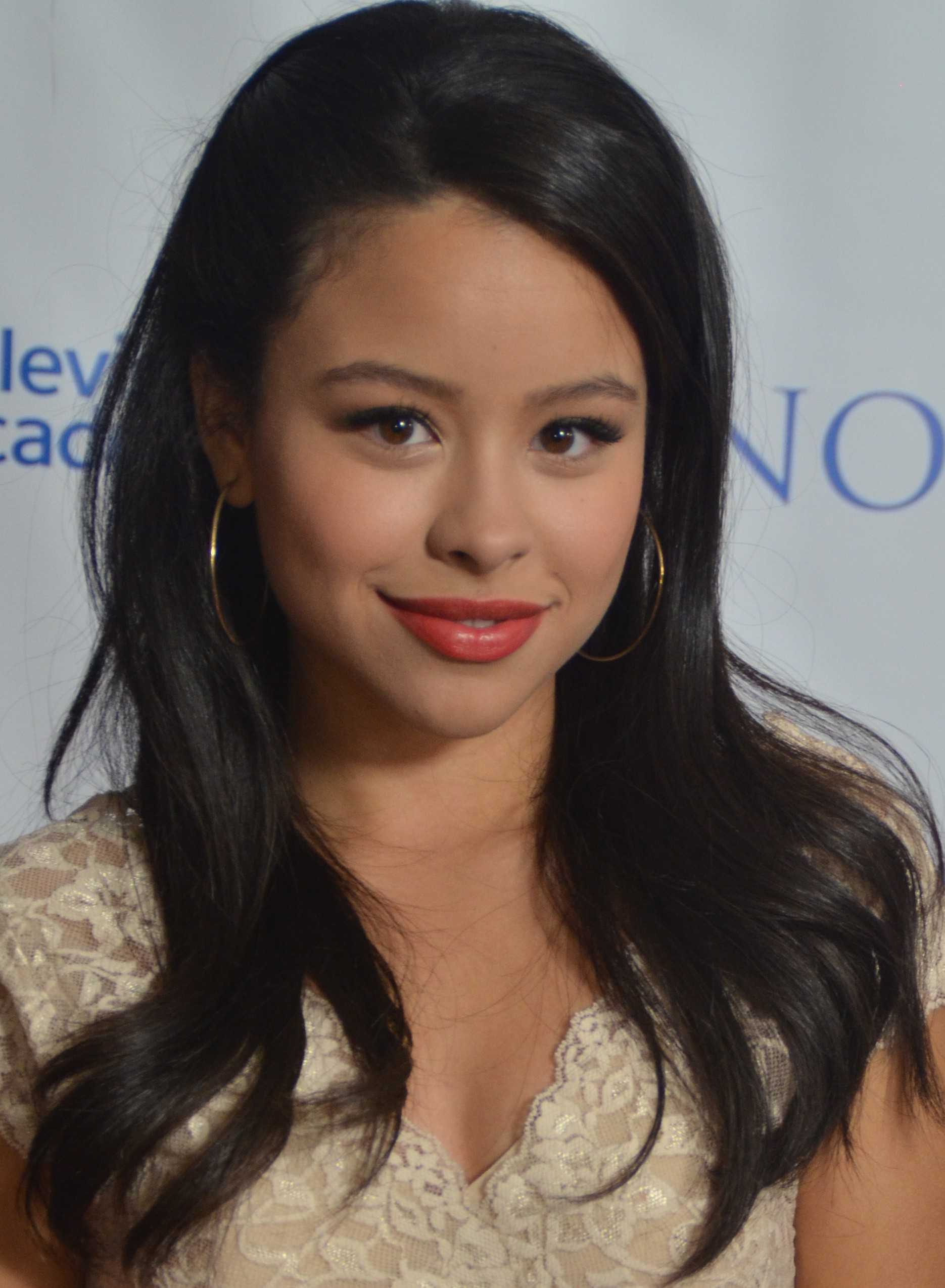
Cierra Ramirez

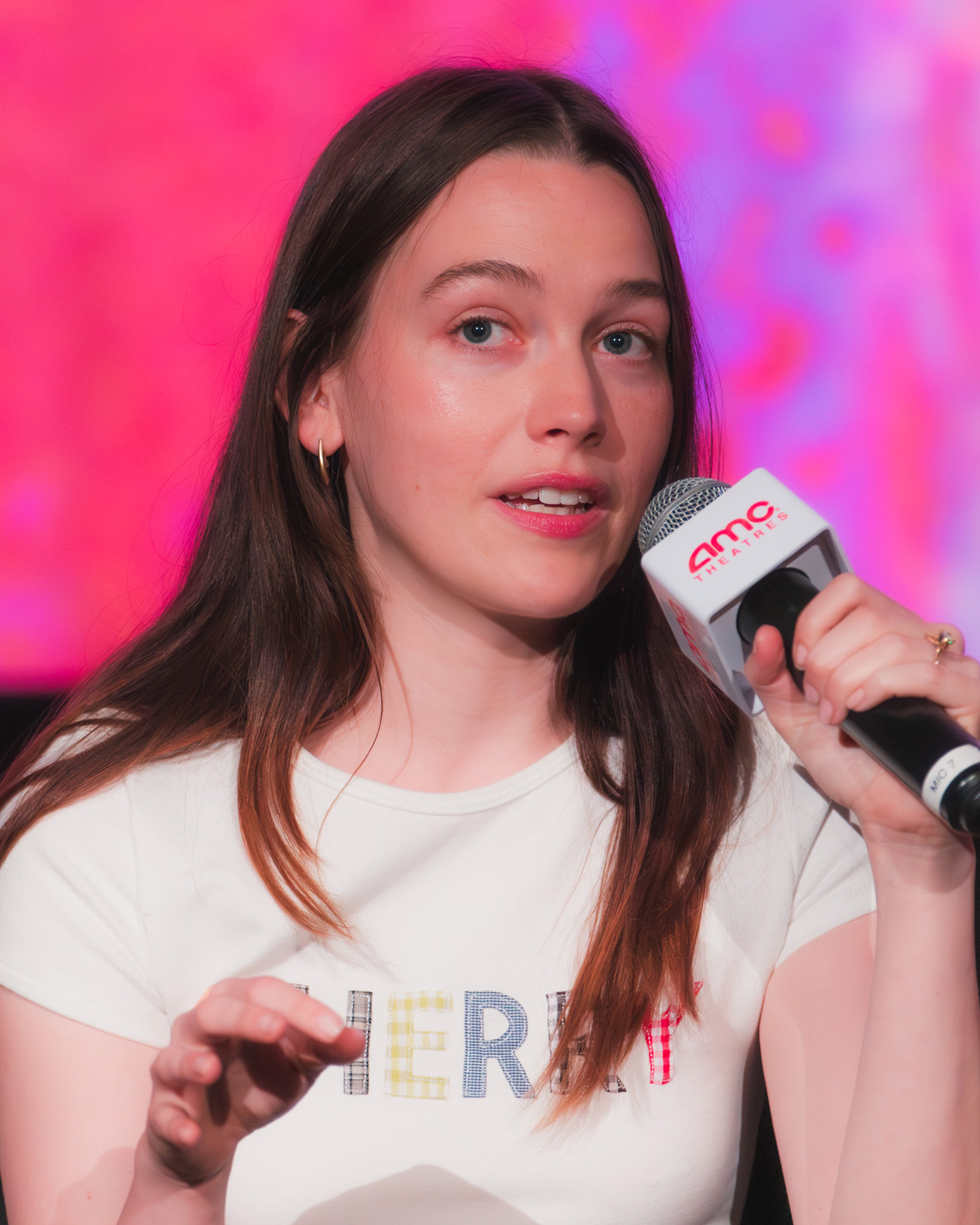
Victoria Pedretti

- March 2 – Mats Møller Dæhli, Norwegian footballer
- March 7 – Haley Lu Richardson, American actress
- March 8 – Keita Baldé, Senegalese footballer
- March 9 – Ángel Correa, Argentine footballer
- March 10 – Zach LaVine, American basketball player
- March 13 – Mikaela Shiffrin, American skier
- March 15 – Jabari Parker, American basketball player
- March 17 – Claressa Shields, American boxer
- March 19 – Héctor Bellerín, Spanish footballer
- March 23 – Ester Ledecká, Czech winter athlete
- March 27 – Zaur Uguev, Russian freestyle wrestler

=== April ===
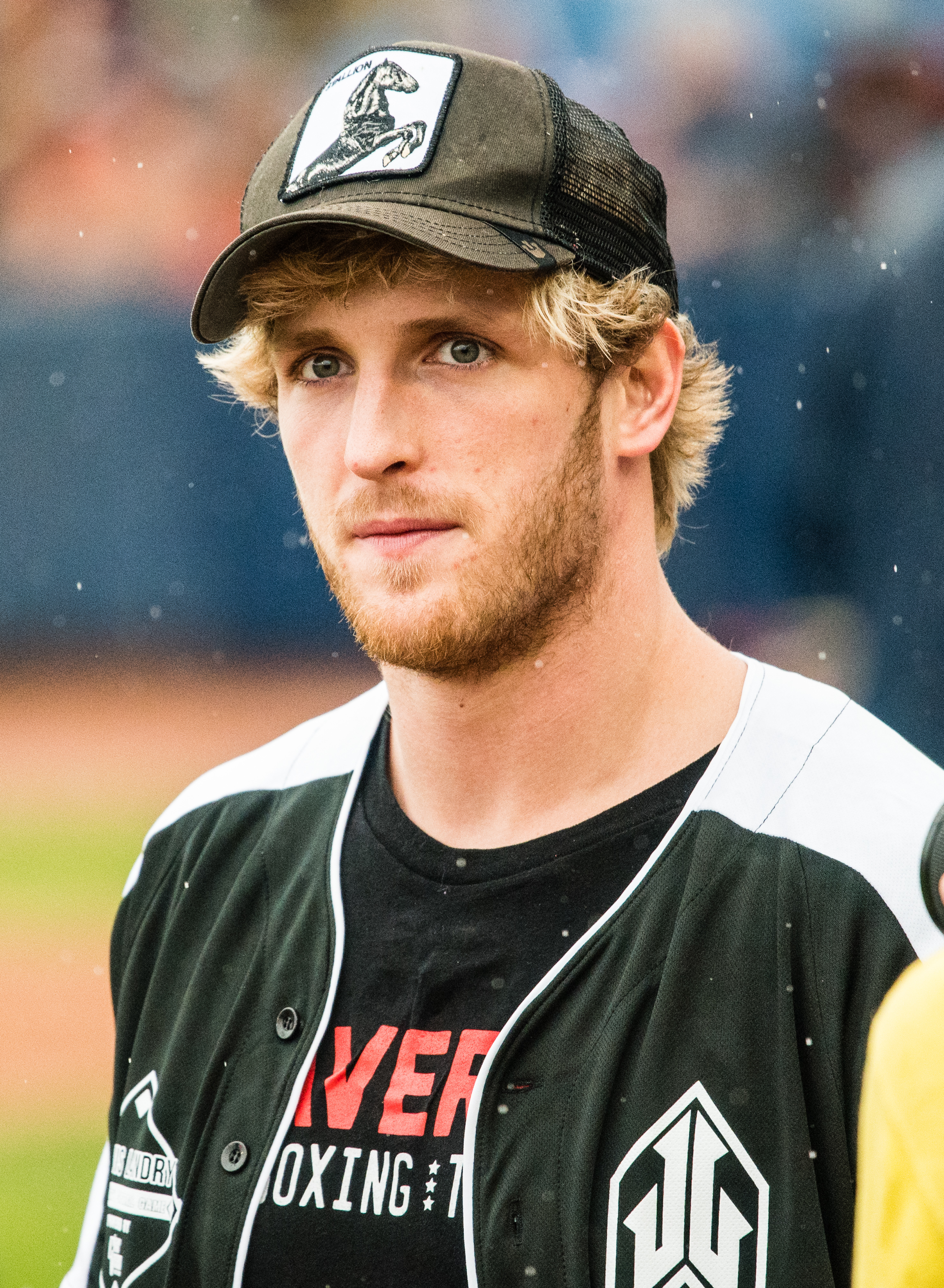
Logan Paul

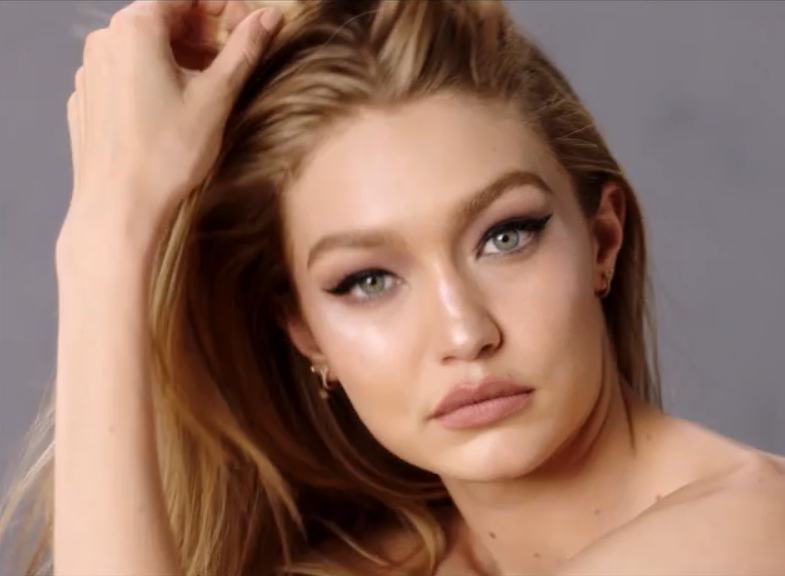
Gigi Hadid

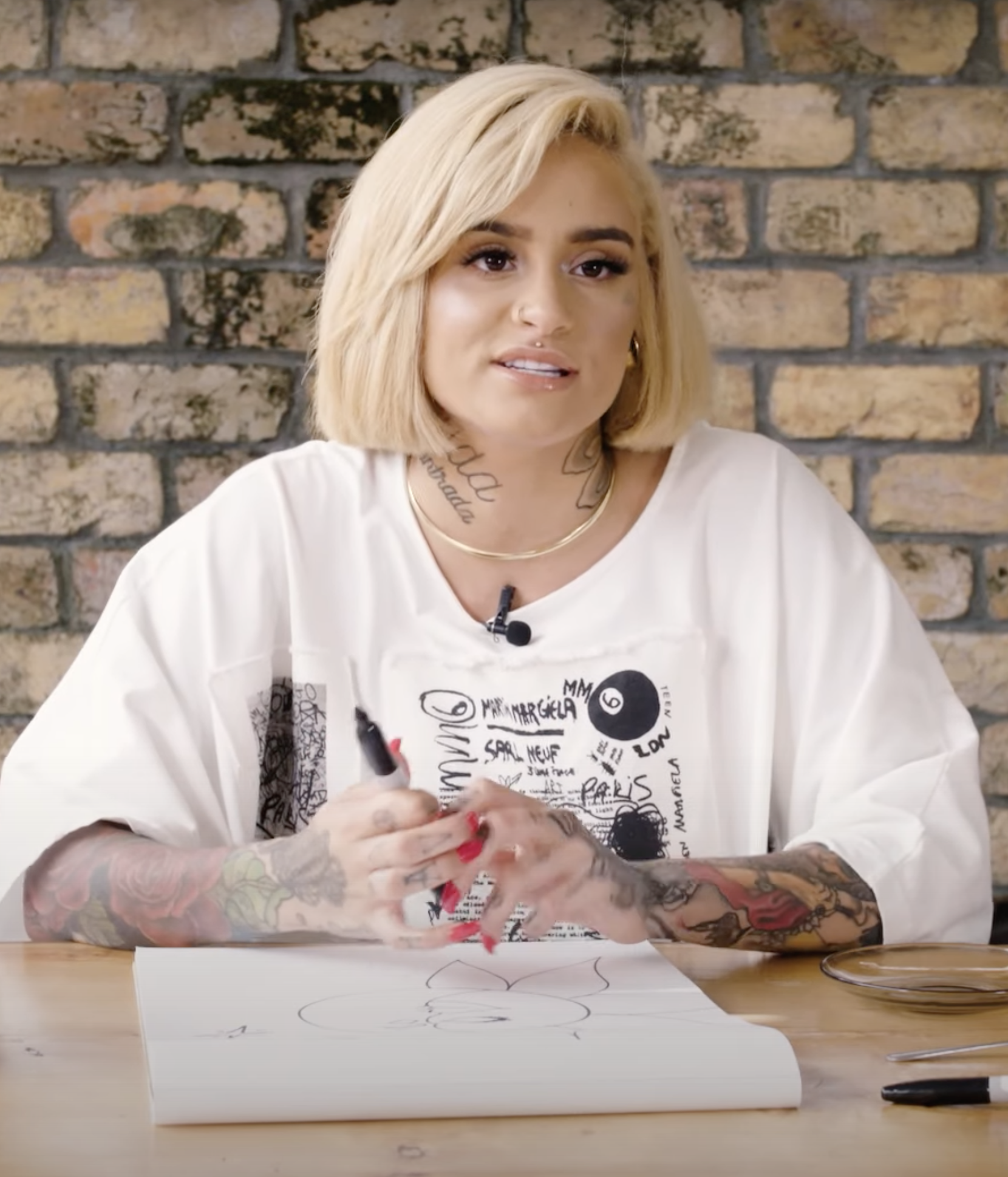
Kehlani

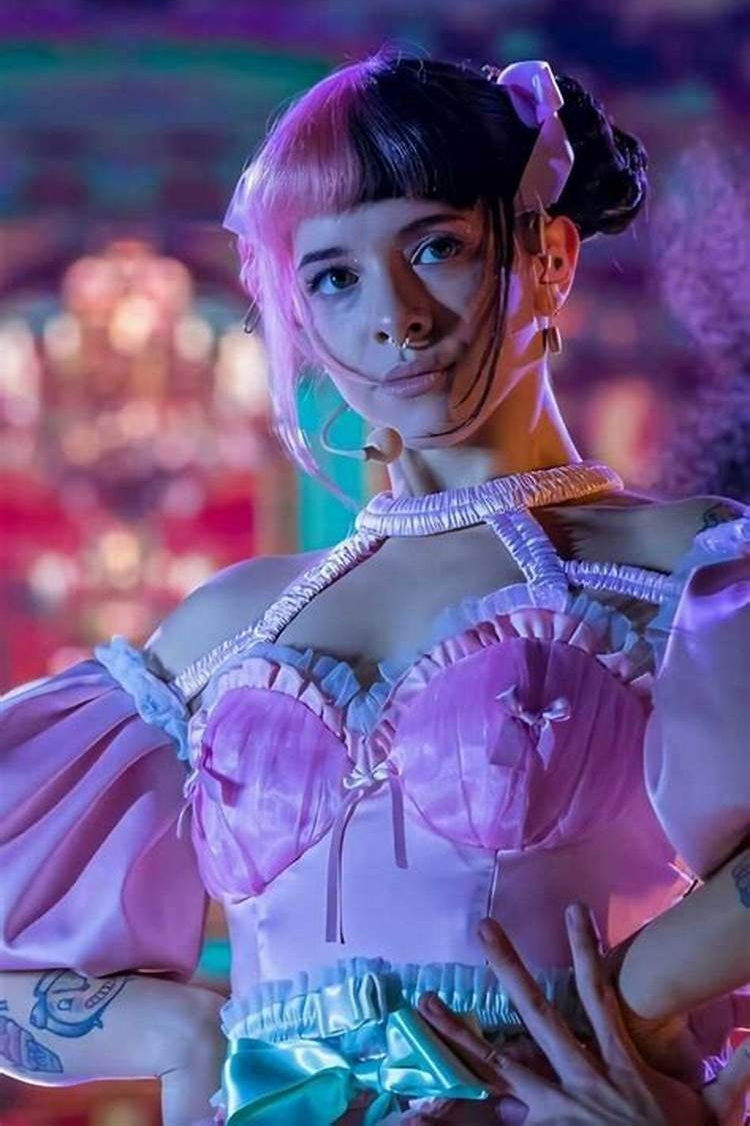
Melanie Martinez

- April 1 – Logan Paul, American actor and YouTube personality
- April 3 – Adrien Rabiot, French footballer
- April 5 – Zofia Wichłacz, Polish actress
- April 7 – Tiril Sjåstad Christiansen, Norwegian freestyle skier
- April 15 – Chiaka Ogbogu, American volleyball player
- April 17 – Wheein, South Korean singer and songwriter
- April 18 – Divock Origi, Belgian footballer
- April 21
  - María José Granatto, Argentine field hockey player
  - Ana Grozdanović, Serbian politician
  - Jonathan Hilbert, German racewalker
- April 23 – Gigi Hadid, American fashion model
- April 24 – Kehlani, American singer
- April 28 – Melanie Martinez, American singer

=== May ===
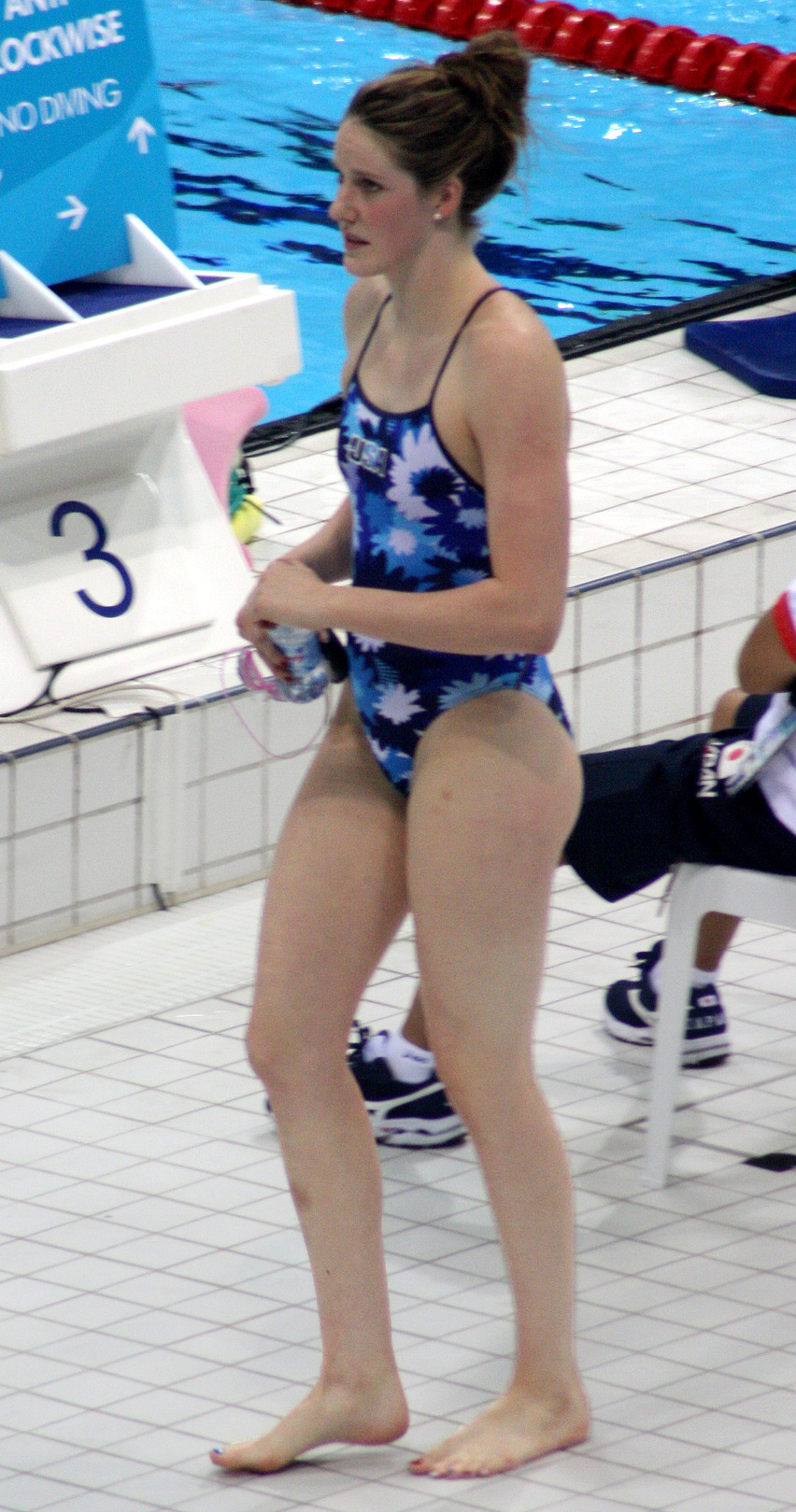
Missy Franklin

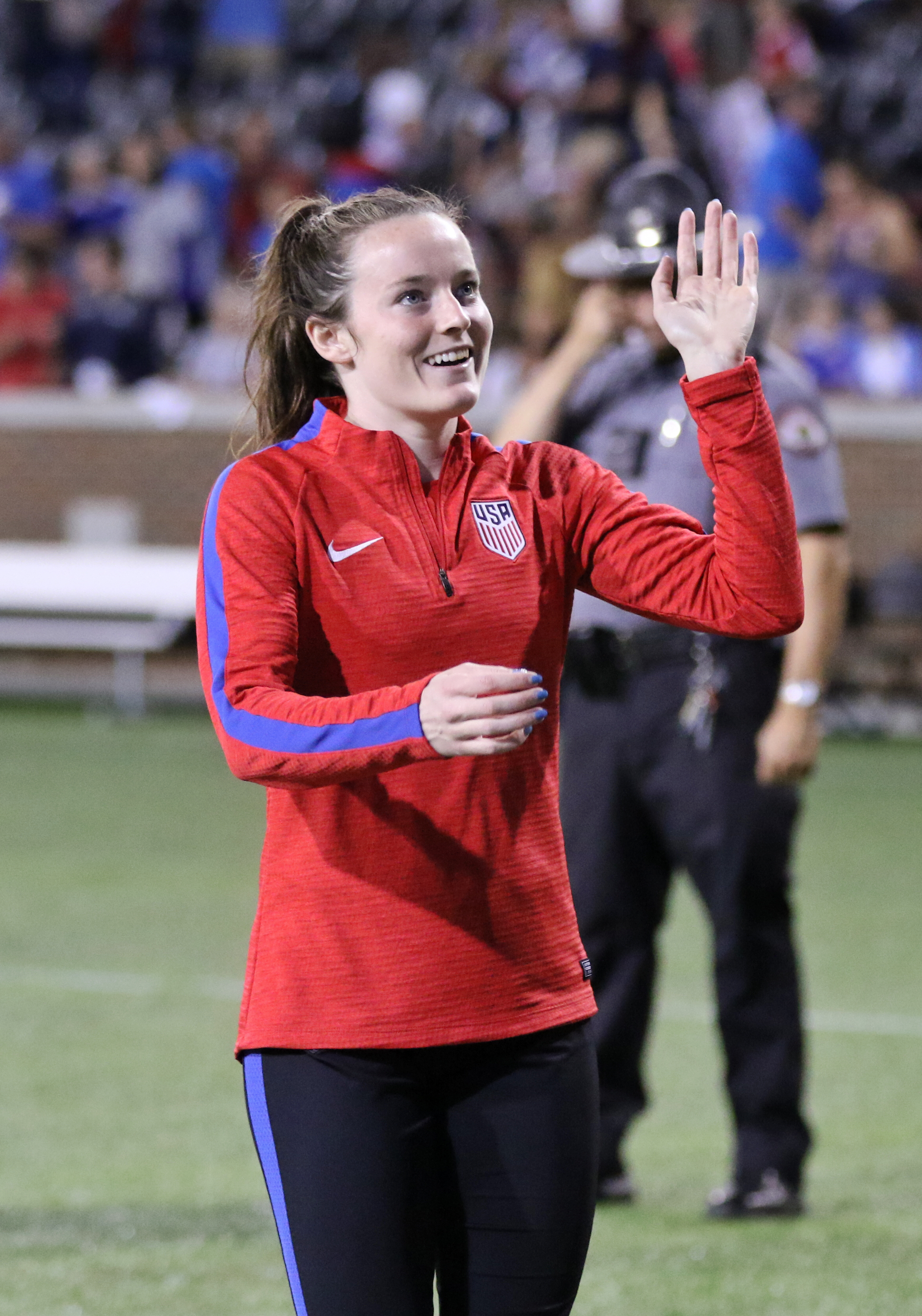
Rose Lavelle

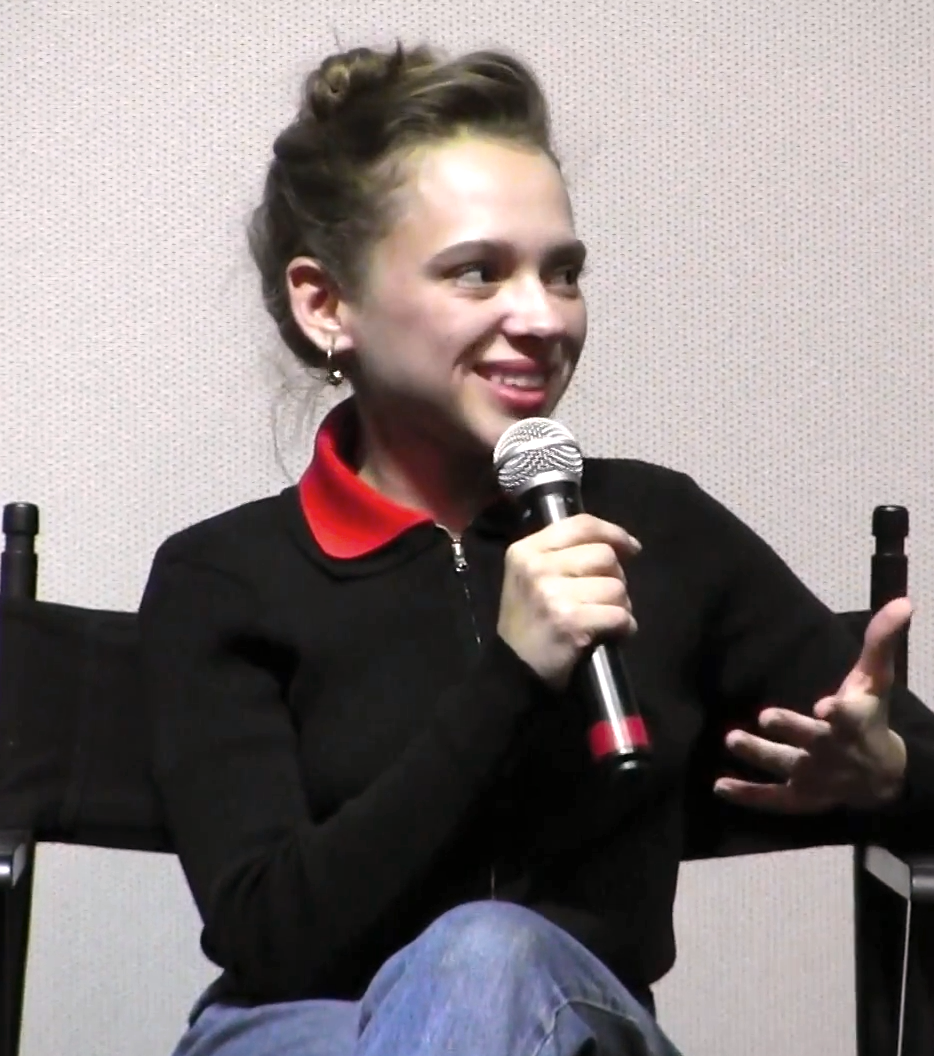
Shira Haas

- May 2 – Yook Sung-jae, South Korean singer and actor
- May 3 – Zach Sobiech, American singer-songwriter and musician (d. 2013)
- May 4 – Kiiara, American singer and songwriter
- May 6 – Marko Pjaca, Croatian footballer
- May 7 – Fred Kerley, American sprinter
- May 9
  - Timothé Luwawu-Cabarrot, French basketball player
  - Beth Mead, English footballer
- May 10
  - Missy Franklin, American swimmer
  - Gabriella Papadakis, French ice dancer
- May 11
  - Gelson Martins, Portuguese footballer
  - Shira Haas, Israeli actress
- May 12 – Kenton Duty, American actor, singer, and dancer
- May 15 – Ksenia Sitnik, Belarusian singer
- May 25 – José Gayà, Spanish footballer
- May 29 – Nicolas Pépé, Ivorian footballer
- May 30 – Lukáš Rohan, Czech canoeist

=== June ===
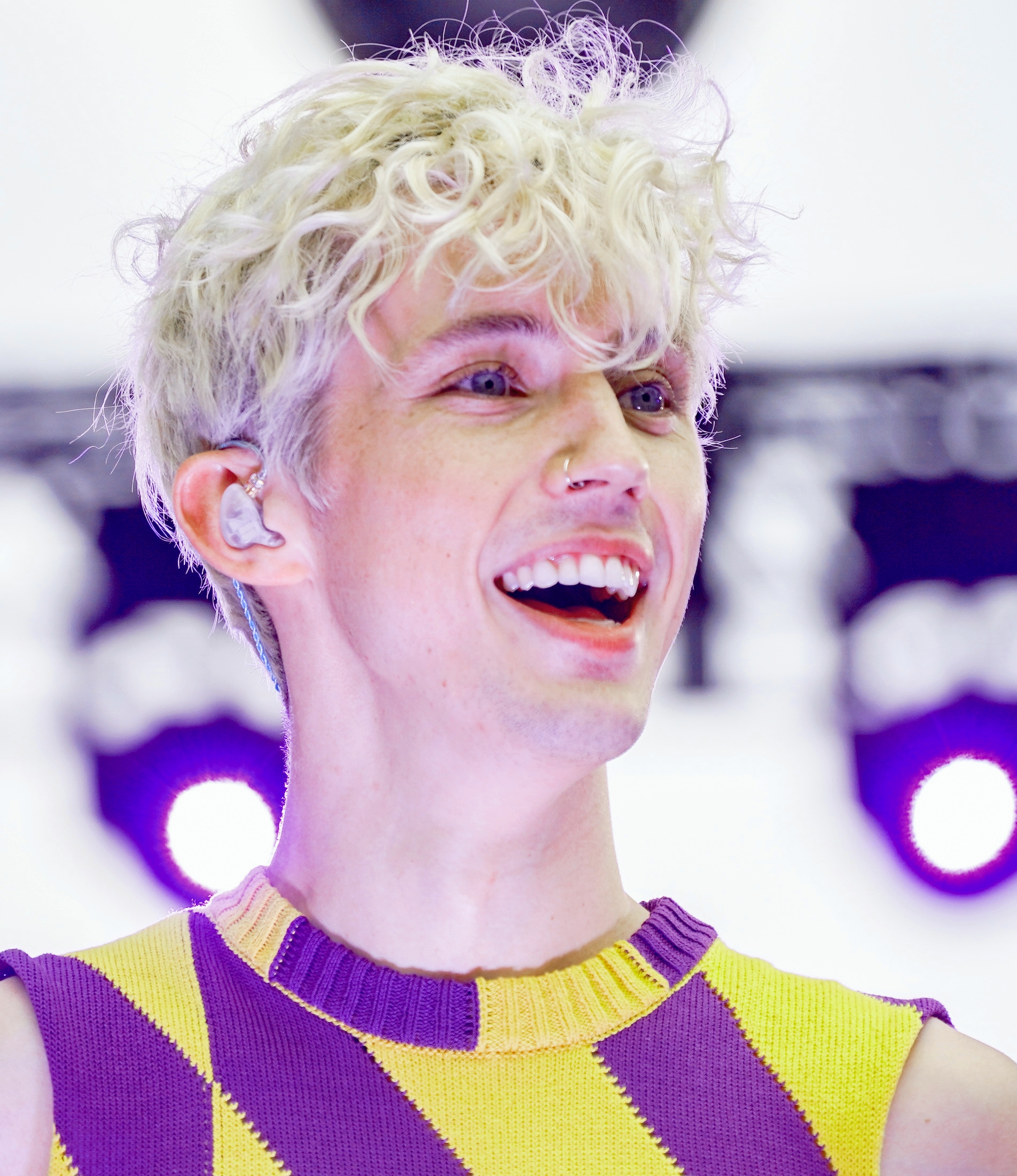
Troye Sivan

- June 2 – Evelyn Mawuli, Japanese basketball player
- June 5 – Troye Sivan, South African-born Australian singer, YouTube personality
- June 13 – Petra Vlhová, Slovak alpine skier
- June 15
  - Manika Batra, Indian table tennis player
  - Emmanuel Korir, Kenyan middle-distance runner
- June 16 – Joseph Schooling, Singaporean swimmer
- June 21
  - Darko Velkovski, Macedonian footballer
  - Jesper Karlström, Swedish footballer
- June 22
  - Aleksandr Maltsev, Russian artistic (synchronized) swimmer
  - Sara Kolak, Croatian javelin thrower
- June 23 – Danna Paola, Mexican singer and actress
- June 28
  - Demi-Leigh Nel-Peters, South African model and beauty pageant titleholder
  - Adama Traoré, Malian footballer
- June 30
  - Marina Ruy Barbosa, Brazilian actress
  - Kristoffer Olsson, Swedish footballer
  - Maria Shurochkina, Russian synchronised swimmer

=== July ===
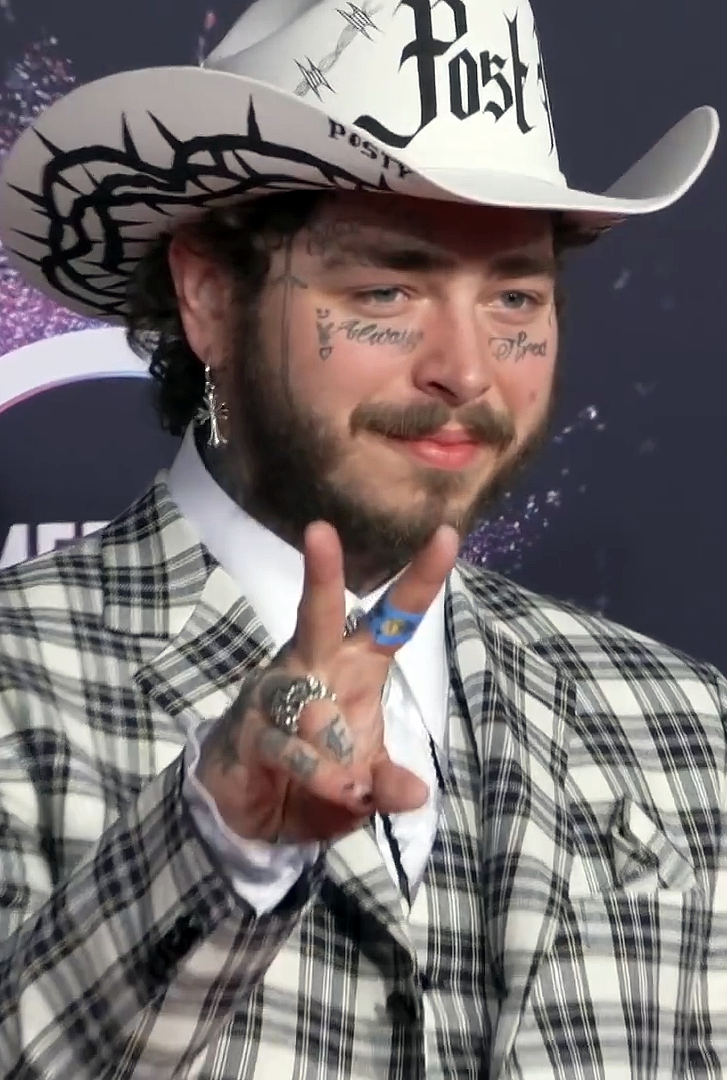
Post Malone

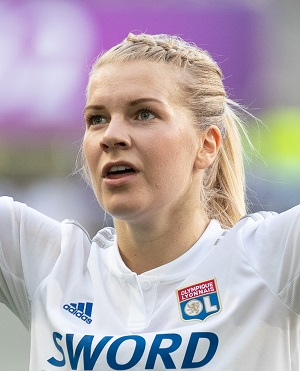
Ada Hegerberg

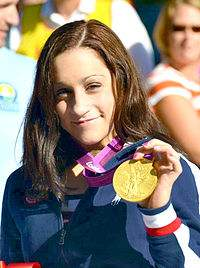
Jordyn Wieber

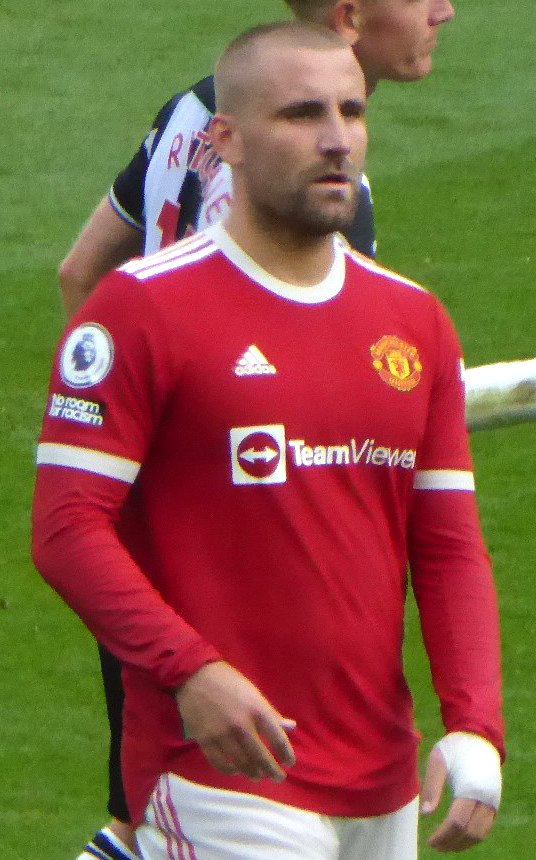
Luke Shaw

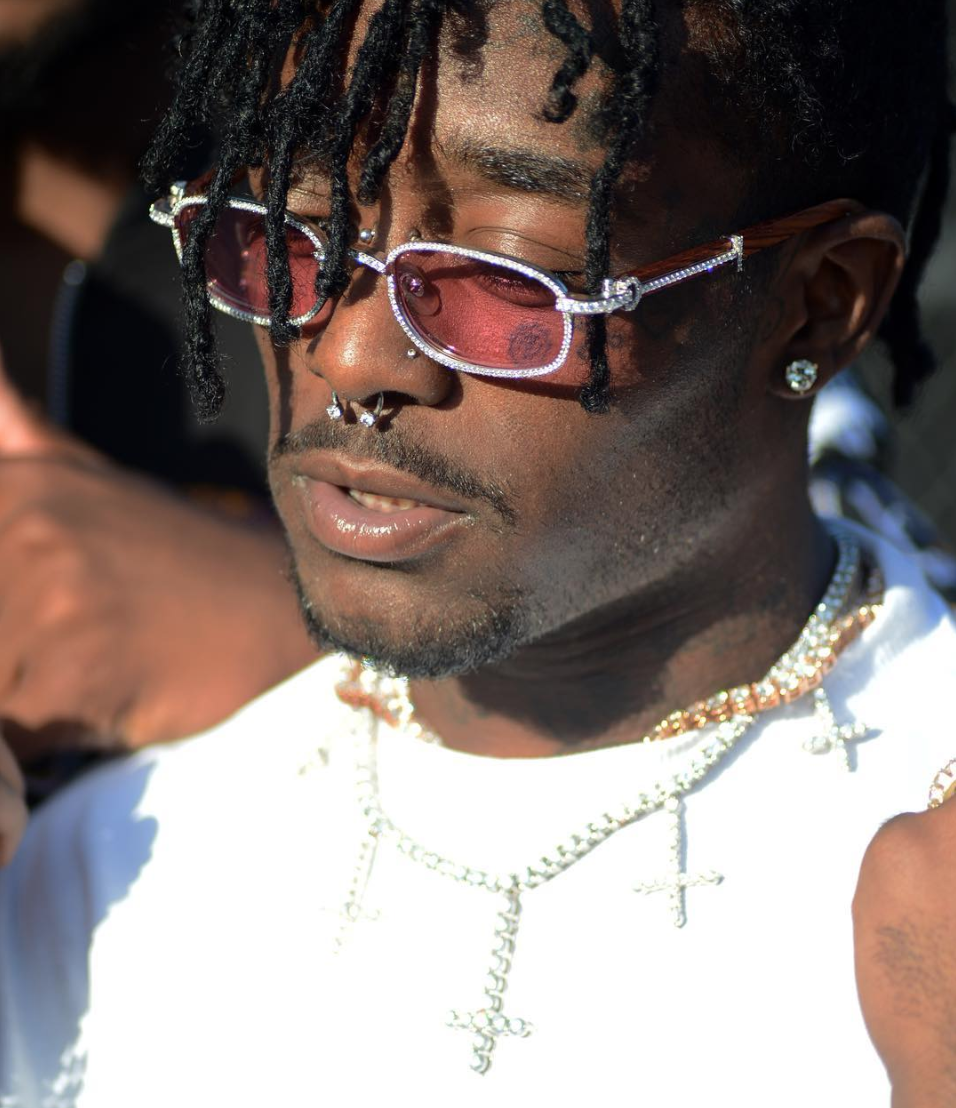
Lil Uzi Vert

- July 2 – Ryan Murphy, American competitive swimmer
- July 4
  - Álex Berenguer, Spanish footballer
  - Vanessa Herzog, Austrian speed skater
  - Post Malone, American rapper
- July 5
  - Hyuk, South Korean singer and actor
  - Phataimas Muenwong, Thai badminton player
- July 10
  - Trayvon Bromell, American sprinter
  - Ada Hegerberg, Norwegian footballer
  - Lu Shanglei, Chinese chess grandmaster
- July 12 – Luke Shaw, English footballer
- July 14
  - Serge Gnabry, German footballer
  - Kim In-hyeok, South Korean volleyball player
- July 19
  - Manuel Akanji, Swiss footballer
  - Matt Miazga, American soccer player
  - Maria Paseka, Russian artistic gymnast
- July 23 – Hwasa, South Korean singer, songwriter, and rapper
- July 24 – Kyle Kuzma, American basketball player
- July 25
  - Sebastian Fakt, Swedish ice hockey player
  - Maria Sakkari, Greek tennis player
- July 30 – Hirving Lozano, Mexican footballer

=== August ===
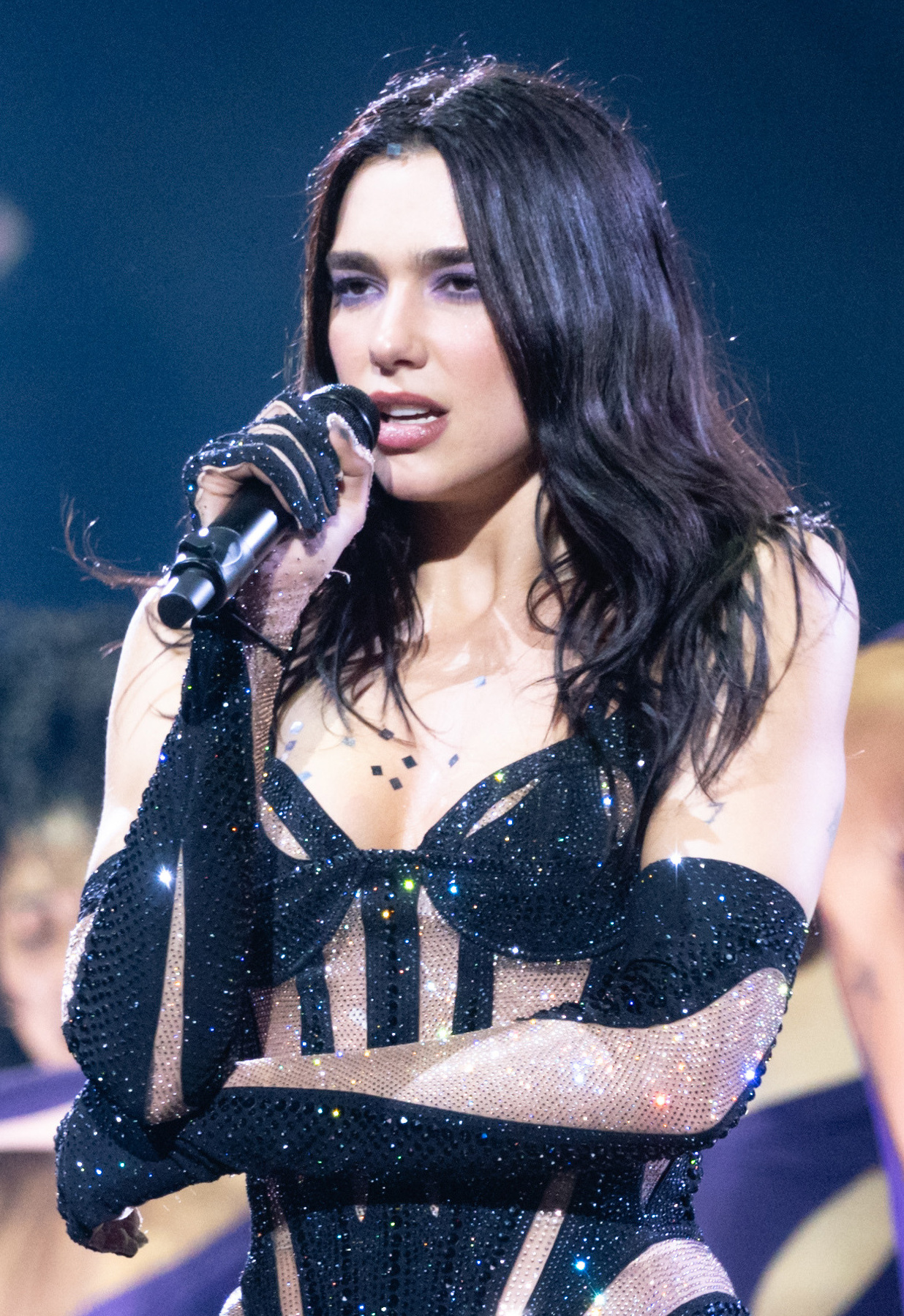
Dua Lipa

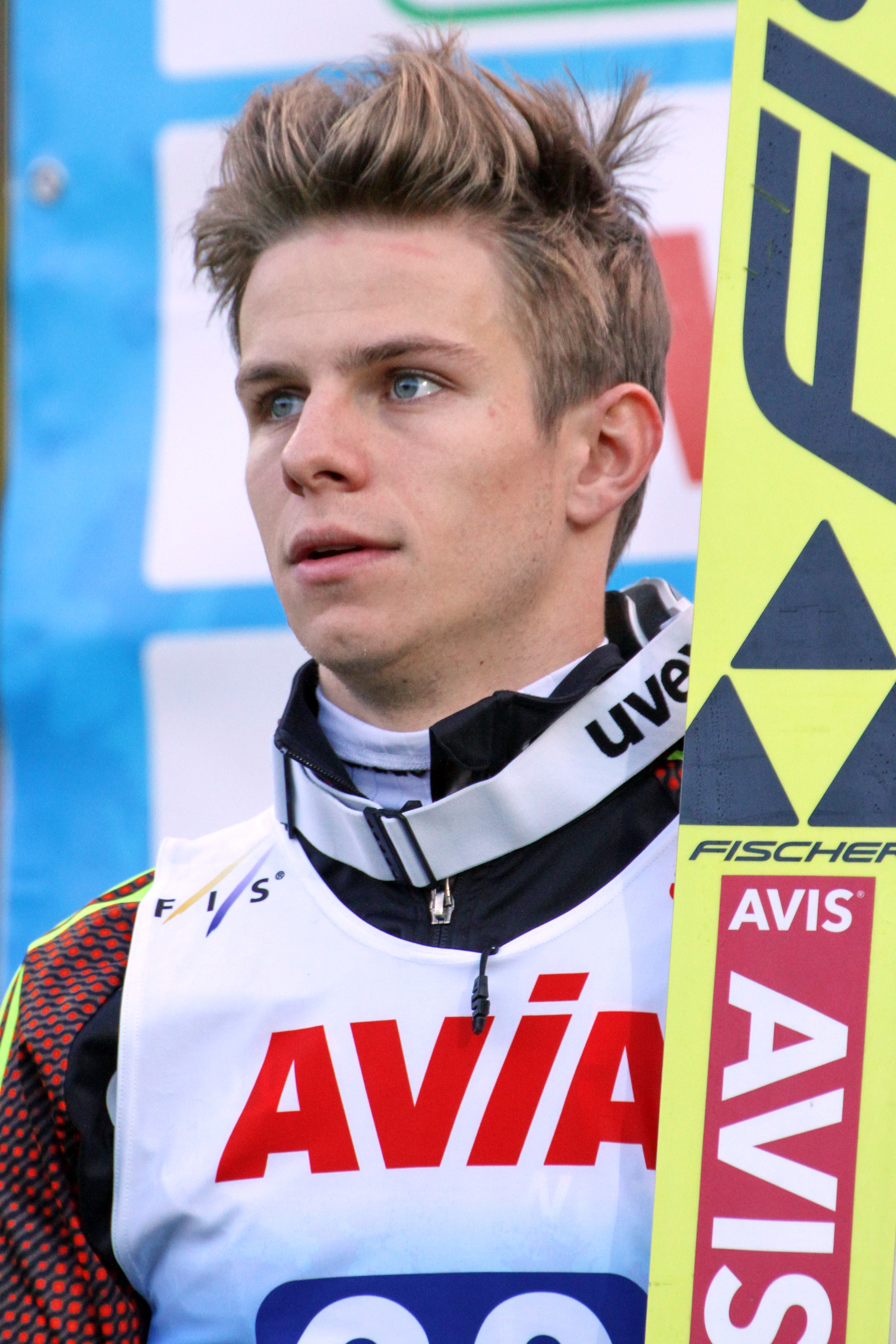
Andreas Wellinger

- August 2
  - Kevin Sanjaya Sukamuljo, Indonesian badminton player
  - Kristaps Porziņģis, Latvian basketball player
- August 4
  - Bruna Marquezine, Brazilian actress
  - Jessica Sanchez, American singer
  - İrem Yaman, Turkish taekwando practitioner
- August 5 – Pierre-Emile Højbjerg, Danish footballer
- August 9 – Hwang Min-hyun, South Korean singer-songwriter and actor
- August 12 – Andy Cruz, Cuban boxer
- August 13 – Presnel Kimpembe, French footballer
- August 15 – Chief Keef, American rapper
- August 16 – James Young, American basketball player
- August 17 – Gracie Gold, American figure skater
- August 22 – Dua Lipa, English singer
- August 23 – Kai Widdrington, English dancer and choreographer
- August 23 – Cecilie Uttrup Ludwig, Danish cyclist
- August 24 – Lady Amelia Windsor, member of the British royal family
- August 26
  - Gracie Dzienny, American actress
  - Solomon Thomas, American football player
- August 27 – Sergey Sirotkin, Russian racing driver
- August 28 – Andreas Wellinger, German ski jumper

=== September ===
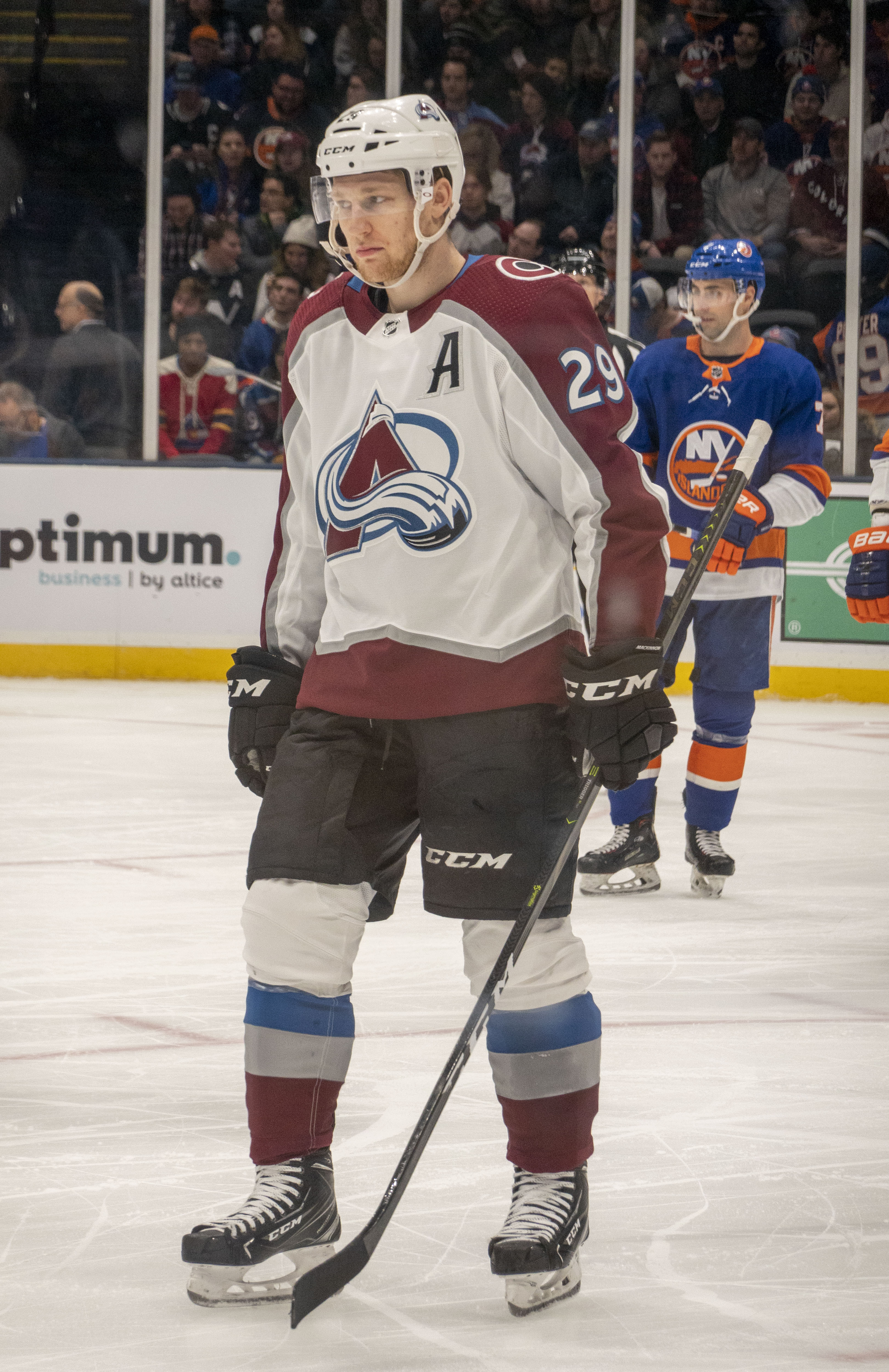
Nathan MacKinnon

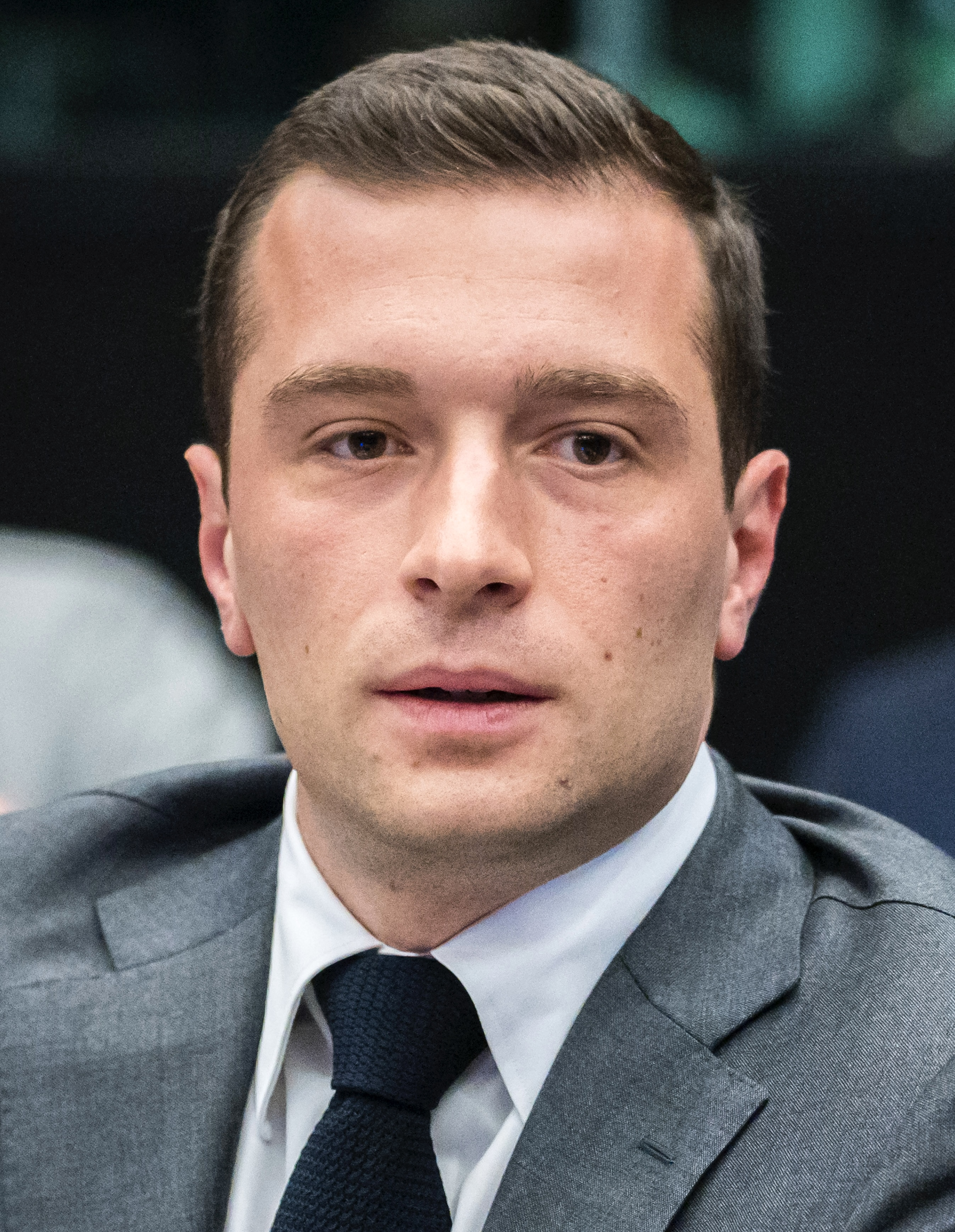
Jordan Bardella

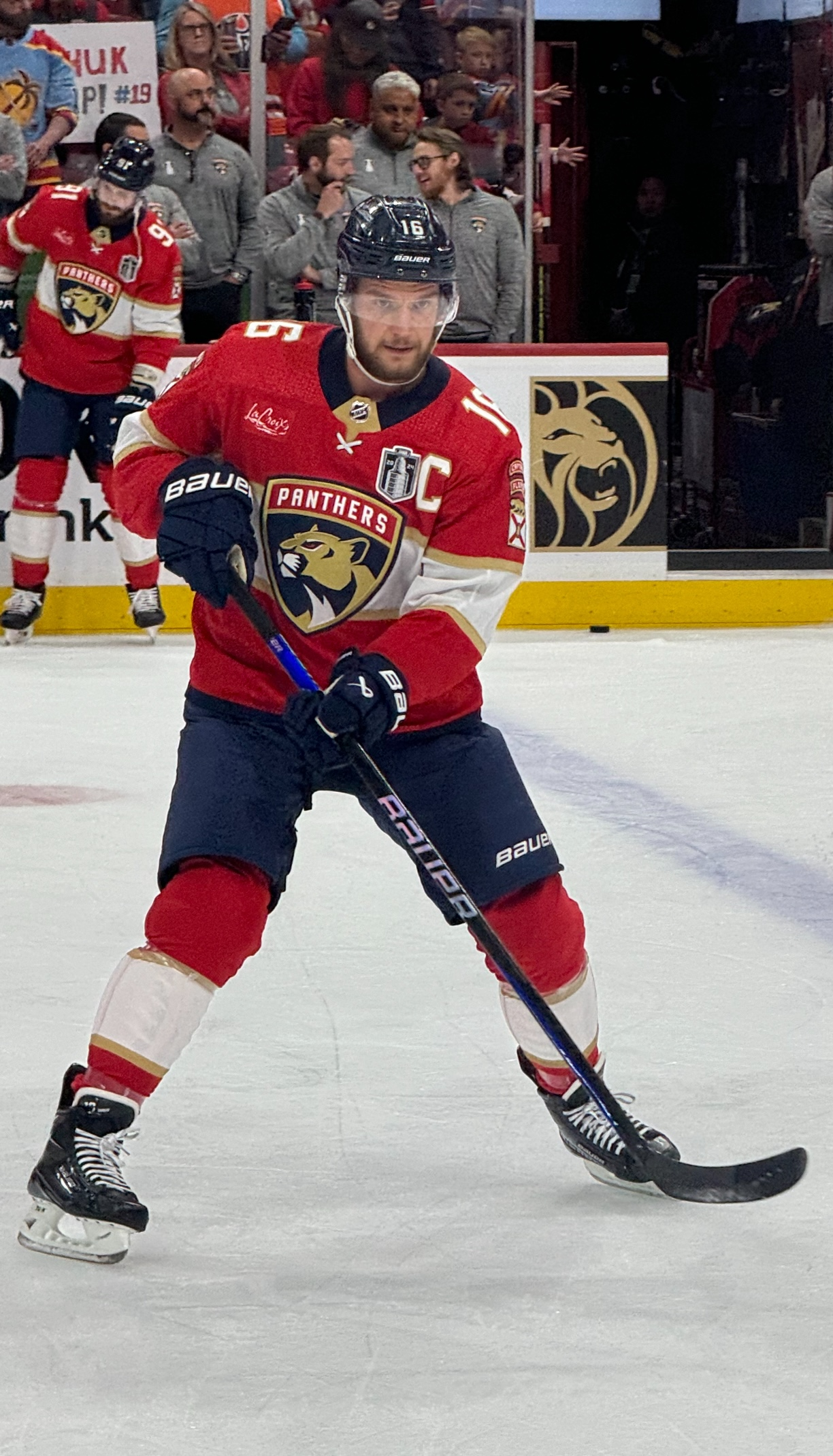
Aleksander Barkov

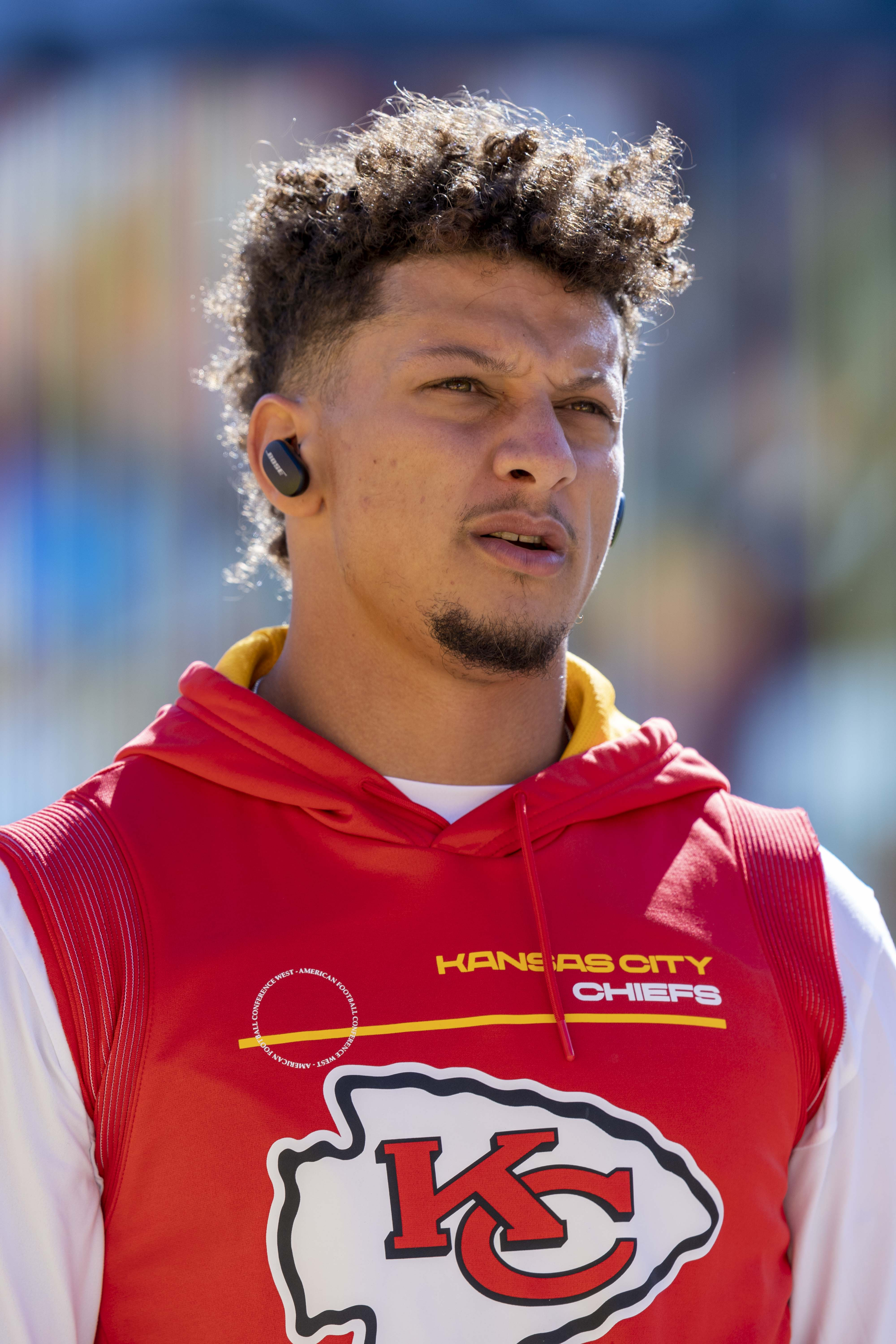
Patrick Mahomes

- September 1
  - Munir El Haddadi, Spanish footballer
  - Nathan MacKinnon, Canadian ice hockey player
- September 2
  - Aleksander Barkov, Finnish ice hockey player
  - Josine Koning, Dutch field hockey player
- September 3 – Niklas Süle, German footballer
- September 6 – Bertrand Traoré, Burkinabé footballer
- September 8 – Julian Weigl, German footballer
- September 12 – Steven Gardiner, Bahamian sprinter
- September 15 – Awer Mabil, Australian association footballer
- September 17 – Patrick Mahomes, American football player
- September 20 – Laura Dekker, Dutch sailor
- September 22 – Nayeon, South Korean singer
- September 23
  - Eli Dershwitz, American fencer
  - Agnes Jebet Tirop, Kenyan athlete (d. 2021)
- September 27 – Yoshihito Nishioka, Japanese tennis player

=== October ===
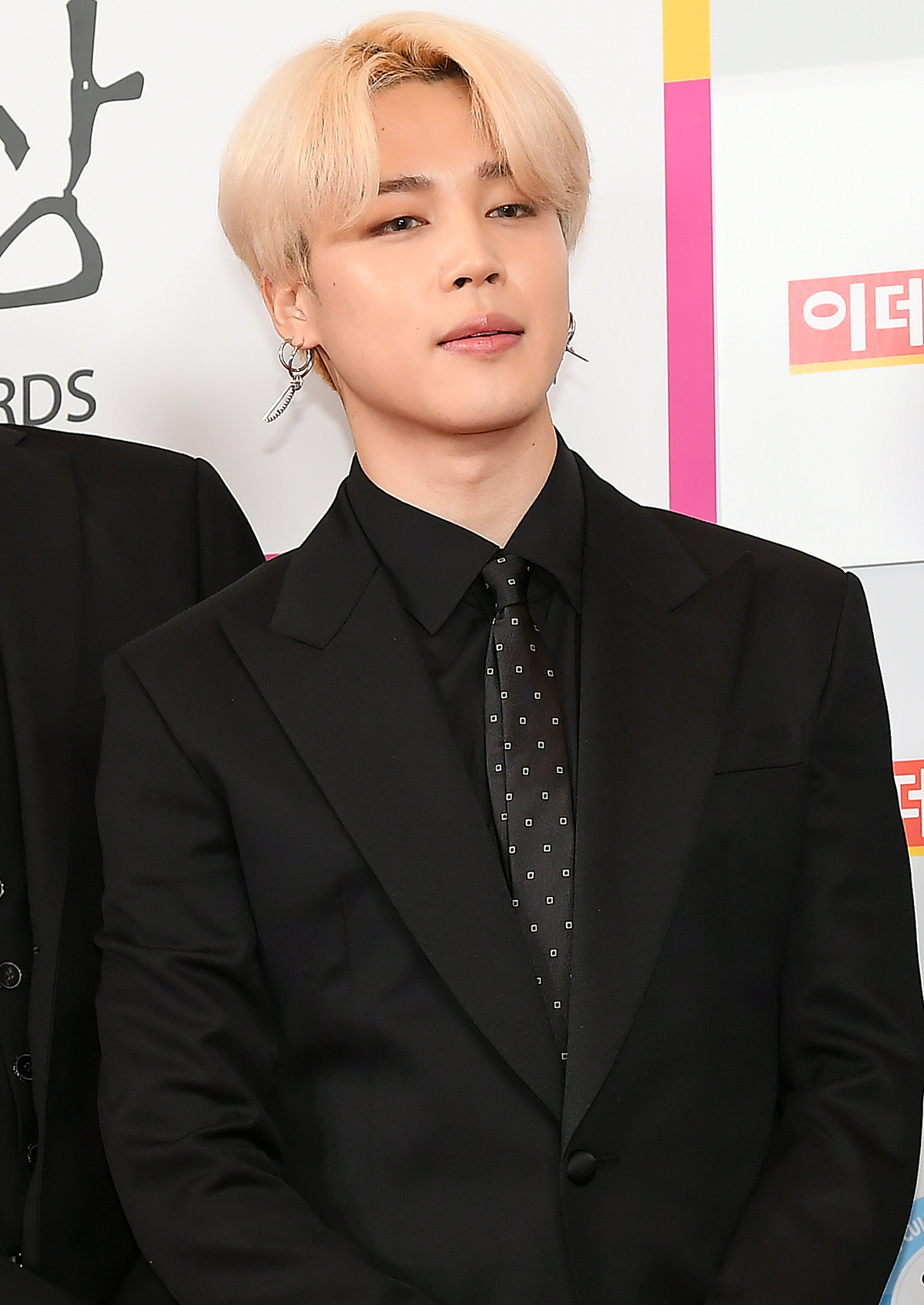
Jimin

- October 1 – Agostina Alonso, Argentine field hockey player
- October 3 – Ayo Edebiri, actress and comedian
- October 4 – Mikolas Josef, Czech singer and music producer
- October 6 – Justine Wong-Orantes, American volleyball player
- October 7
  - Slađana Mirković, Serbian volleyball player
  - Lyndon Dykes, Scotland international footballer
  - Petar Stojanović, Slovenian footballer
- October 9 – Kenny Tete, Dutch footballer
- October 13 – Jimin, South Korean singer
- October 15 – Billy Unger, American actor
- October 21 – Yulimar Rojas, Venezuelan triple jumper
- October 21 – Doja Cat, American rapper
- October 25 – Jock Landale, Australian basketball player
- October 31 – Kat La/ItsFunneh, Canadian YouTuber, part of YouTube gaming group Krew

=== November ===
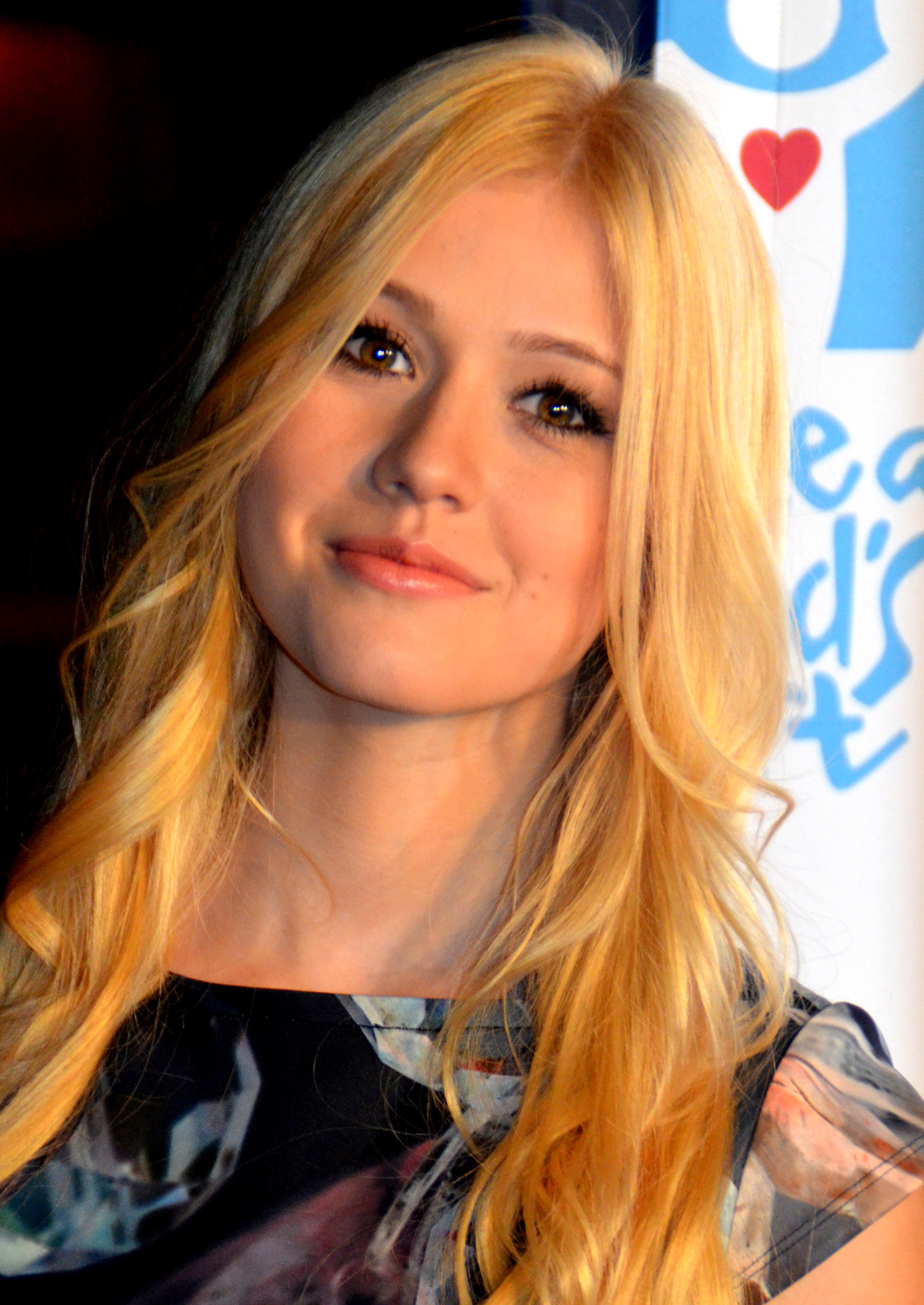
Katherine McNamara

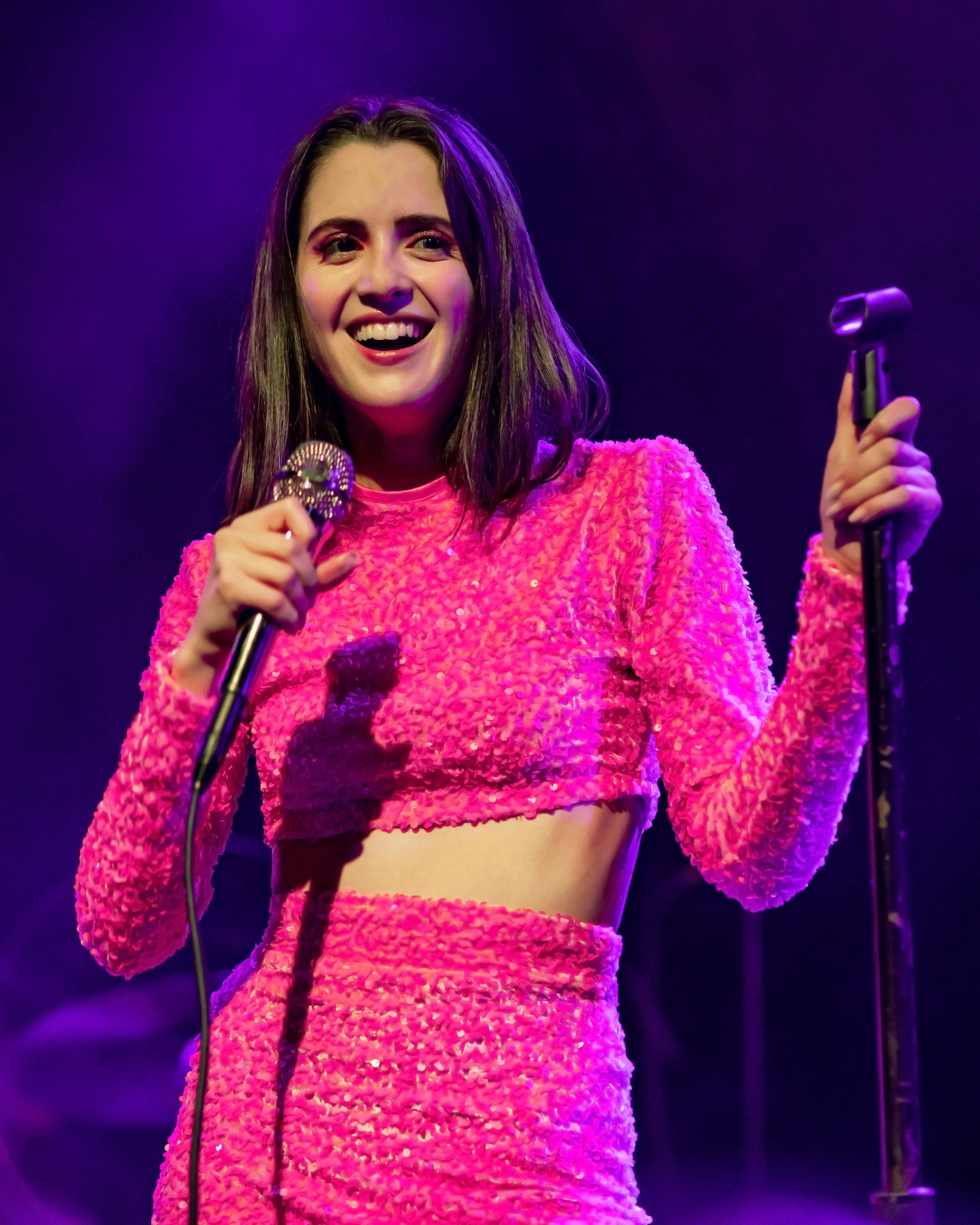
Laura Marano

- November 1 – Nour El Sherbini, Egyptian squash player
- November 2 – Hanna Öberg, Swedish biathlete
- November 3 – Kelly Catlin, American racing cyclist (d. 2019)
- November 8 – Xan de Waard, Dutch field hockey player
- November 15 – Karl-Anthony Towns, Dominican-American basketball player
- November 17 – Elise Mertens, Belgian tennis player
- November 18 – Ihsan Maulana Mustofa, Indonesian badminton player
- November 19
  - Asuka Teramoto, Japanese artistic gymnast
  - Melinda Ademi, Kosovan singer
- November 20
  - Timothy Cheruiyot, Kenyan athlete
  - Kateryna Reznik, Ukrainian synchronised swimmer
  - Toni-Ann Williams, Jamaican gymnast
- November 22 – Katherine McNamara, American actress
- November 28 – Tin Jedvaj, Croatian footballer
- November 29 – Laura Marano, American actress and singer

=== December ===
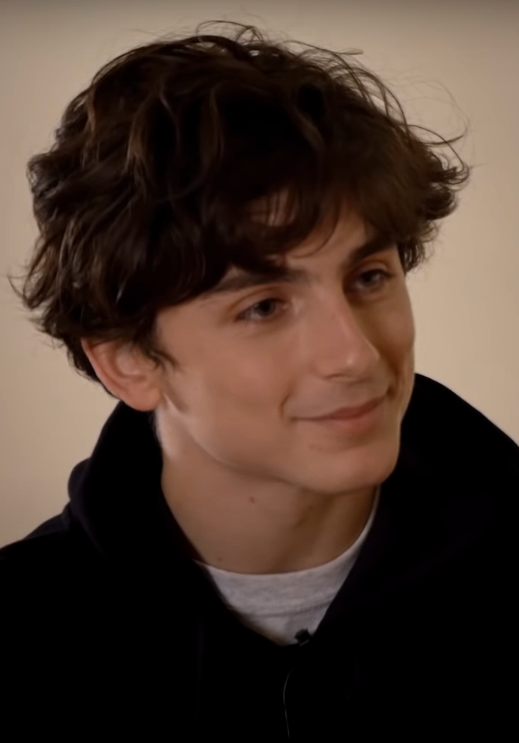
Timothée Chalamet

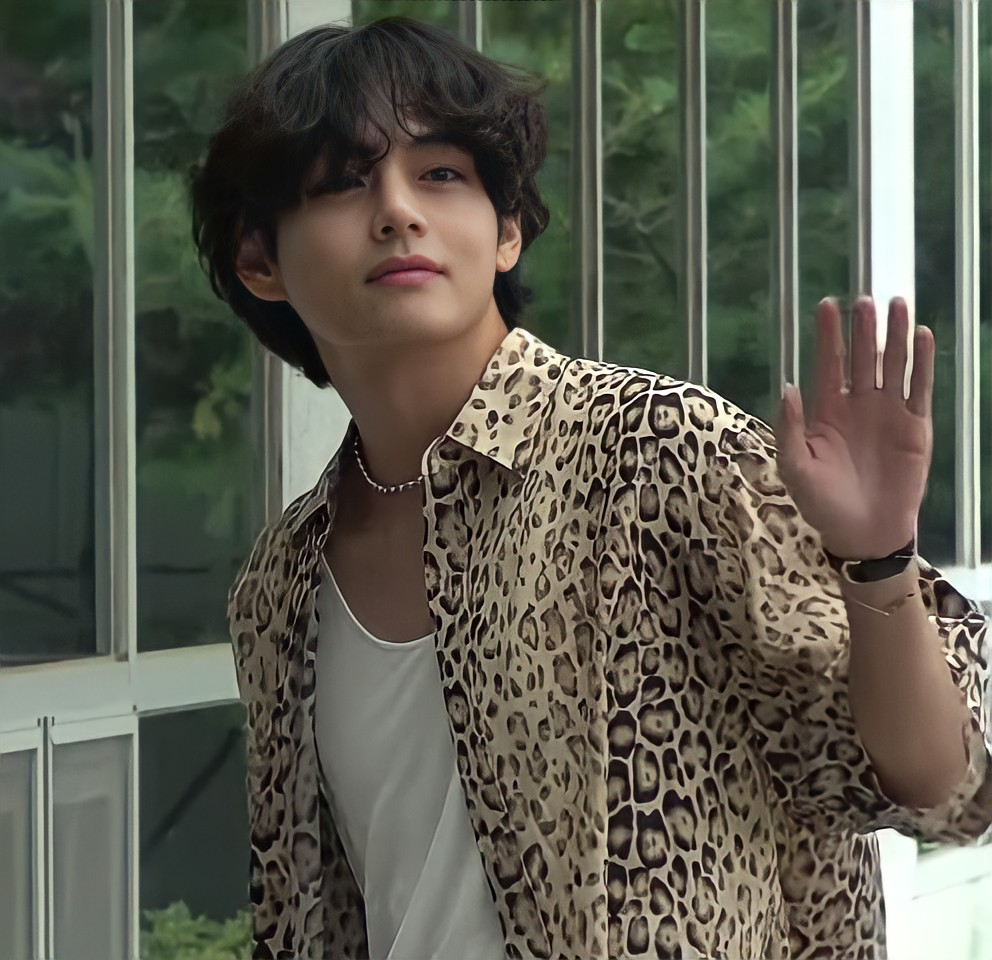
V

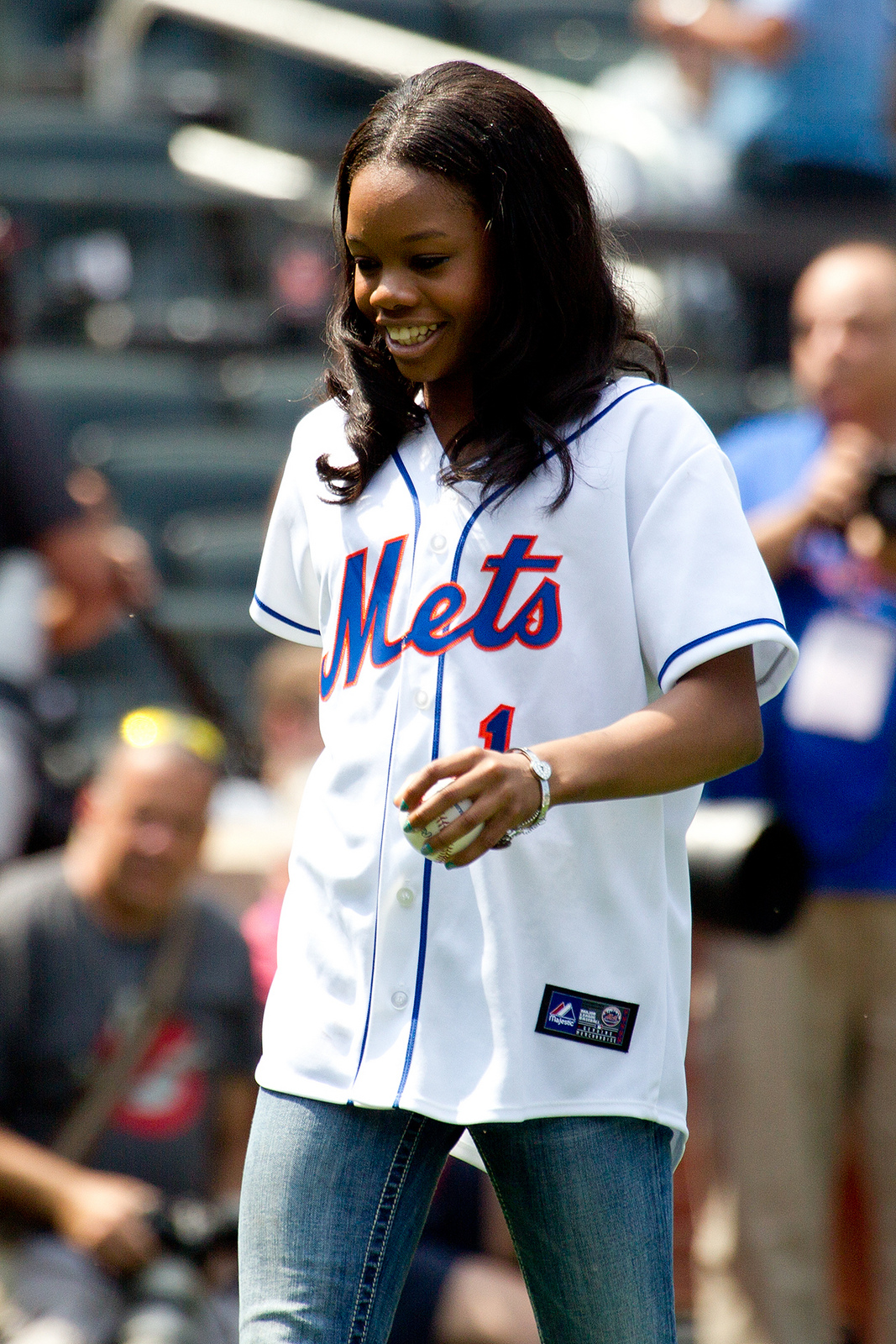
Gabby Douglas

- December 3 – Angèle, Belgian singer
- December 4 – Dina Asher-Smith, British sprinter
- December 5
  - Anthony Martial, French footballer
  - Kaetlyn Osmond, Canadian figure skater
- December 6 – A Boogie wit da Hoodie, American rapper
- December 9
  - McKayla Maroney, American gymnast
  - Kelly Oubre Jr., American basketball player
- December 14 – Yulia Belokobylskaya, Russian gymnast
- December 18 – Guerschon Yabusele, French basketball player
- December 18 – Lim Na-young, South Korean singer
- December 24 – Anett Kontaveit, Estonian tennis player
- December 27
  - Timothée Chalamet, French-American actor
  - Carlos Cuevas, Spanish actor
- December 29 – Ross Lynch, American actor
- December 30
  - Fabiana Bytyqi, Czech boxer
  - Sakura Fujiwara, Japanese actress
  - V, South Korean singer
- December 31 – Gabby Douglas, American gymnast

== Nobel Prizes ==

- Physics – Martin L. Perl, Frederick Reines
- Chemistry – Paul J. Crutzen, Mario J. Molina, F. Sherwood Rowland
- Medicine – Edward B. Lewis, Christiane Nüsslein-Volhard, Eric F. Wieschaus
- Literature – Seamus Heaney
- Bank of Sweden Prize in Economic Sciences in Memory of Alfred Nobel – Robert Lucas, Jr.
- Peace – Joseph Rotblat and the Pugwash Conferences on Science and World Affairs
