= 2011–12 AIK IF season =

Elitserien ice hockey team season

2011–12 AIK
- League: Regular: 7th Playoffs: Semifinals SHL
- 2011–12 record: 19–19–17
- Home record: 12–7–9
- Road record: 7–12–8
- Goals for: 146
- Goals against: 132

Team information
- General manager: Anders Gozzi
- Coach: Roger Melin
- Assistant coach: Gunnar Persson
- Captain: Dick Tärnström
- Alternate captains: Christian Sandberg
- Arena: Hovet, Ericsson Globe
- Average attendance: Regular: 5,450; Playoffs: 8,094

Team leaders
- Goals: Richard Gynge (28)
- Assists: Robert Rosén (39)
- Points: Robert Rosén (60)
- Penalty minutes: Patrik Nemeth (55)
- Wins: Viktor Fasth (24)
- Goals against average: Viktor Fasth (2.12)

The 2011–12 AIK IF season is AIK's 28th and current season in the Elitserien ice hockey league (SEL), the top division in Sweden. The regular season began on September 15, 2011, at home against Timrå IK and concluded on March 6, 2012, at home against Skellefteå AIK. The following playoffs began on March 10 and ended on April 7.

AIK improved from previous season by finishing 7th in the regular season and once again qualified for the playoffs. Richard Gynge captured the Håkan Loob Trophy by scoring 28 goals, and Robert Rosén won the scoring league with 60 points (21 goals, 39 assists). Viktor Fasth also won the Honken Trophy for the second consecutive year. Just like last year, AIK were chosen to meet the regular-season champions, Luleå HF, in the quarterfinals. AIK eliminated Luleå in five games and advanced to the semifinals for the second consecutive year, where they would face Skellefteå AIK. AIK were once again eliminated in the semifinals, this time in seven games.

== Pre-season ==
=== Game log ===
2011 AIK exhibition games log

Exhibition games: 5–2–2
#	Date	Opponent	Score	OT	Goaltender	Protocol	Ref
1	July 29	Visby/Roma HK	2 – 1		Fasth/Svensson	1–0–0
2	August 18	Brynäs IF	4 – 2		Viktor Fasth	2–0–0
3	August 23	Timrå IK	1 – 4		Markus Svensson	2–1–0
4	August 25	Ilves	2 – 4		Viktor Fasth	2–2–0
5	August 27	HPK	4 – 3		Markus Svensson	3–2–0
6	August 31	Södertälje SK	2 – 1		Viktor Fasth	4–2–0
7	September 2	Almtuna IS	3 – 4	SO	Markus Svensson	4–2–1
8	September 8	Skellefteå AIK	3 – 2	SO	Viktor Fasth	4–2–2
9	September 10	Modo Hockey	4 – 1		Viktor Fasth	5–2–2

Legend: Win Overtime win Loss Overtime loss

== Regular season ==
=== Summary ===
AIK's first local derby game of the season, against Djurgårdens IF, was played on September 20, 2011. AIK lost the game 4–2, which recorded AIK's fourth consecutive loss to Djurgården counting the teams' previous season meetings.

By beating Färjestads BK 2–1 in the second round, on away ice in a shootout, AIK recorded their first win against Färjestad in over ten years since 2001, the year when AIK were last relegated from the SEL.

On November 14, 2011, after a one-week break, AIK resumed the season with the second Stockholm derby game of the season against Djurgården. AIK were dressed as the home team. Because of illness, AIK's primary goaltender Viktor Fasth could not play and was replaced by the team's main backup goaltender Markus Svensson. Junior goaltender Niklas Lundström was dressed as the team's backup goaltender in the game. In front of 11,428 spectators, Svensson shutout Djurgården as AIK came on top with a 5–0 win. This was the biggest win in a Stockholm derby since November 15, 2001 (5–0 to Djurgården), AIK's biggest Stockholm derby win since December 28, 2000 (5–0 to AIK), as well as the first shutout win in a Stockholm derby since the November 15, 2001 game. This was also Svensson's first shutout win in the Elitserien league. As a result of the win, AIK received three points and jumped to the ninth spot in the standings at 26 points, the same number of points as Djurgården at that time.

=== Standings ===
2011–12 Elitserien season	GP	W	L	OTW	OTL	GF	GA	GD	Pts
Luleå HF^{y}	55	25	13	8	9	128	104	+24	100
Skellefteå AIK^{x}	55	26	17	5	7	148	125	+23	95
HV71^{x}	55	22	16	9	8	151	130	+21	92
Brynäs IF^{x}	55	25	19	6	5	148	140	+8	92
Frölunda HC^{x}	55	22	17	8	8	140	113	+27	90
Färjestad BK^{x}	55	23	18	4	10	124	124	0	87
AIK^{x}	55	19	19	8	9	146	132	+14	82
Modo Hockey^{x}	55	19	22	8	6	146	147	–1	79
Växjö Lakers HC^{e}	55	18	22	8	7	124	133	–9	77
Linköpings HC^{e}	55	17	24	7	7	120	138	–18	72
Djurgårdens IF^{r}	55	15	23	10	7	123	144	–21	72
Timrå IK^{r}	55	10	31	8	6	115	183	–68	52

x – clinched playoff spot; y – clinched regular season league title; e – eliminated from playoff contention; r – play in relegation series

=== Game log ===
2011–12 AIK IF regulation games log: 19–19–17 (Home: 12–7–9; Away: 7–12–8)

September: 2–3–2 (Home: 1–1–1; Away: 1–2–1)
#	Date	Opponent	Score	OT	Goaltender	Venue	Attendance	Protocol	Pts	Ref
1	September 15	Timrå IK	5 – 1		Viktor Fasth	Hovet	5,475	1–0–0	3
2	September 17	Färjestad BK	2 – 1	SO	Viktor Fasth	Löfbergs Lila Arena	6,281	1–0–1	5
9	September 20	Djurgårdens IF	2 – 4		Viktor Fasth	Ericsson Globe	13,850	1–1–1	5
3	September 22	Modo Hockey	2 – 0		Viktor Fasth	Fjällräven Center	5,684	2–1–1	8
4	September 24	Frölunda HC	1 – 0	SO	Viktor Fasth	Hovet	4,815	2–1–2	10
5	September 26	Linköpings HC	2 – 5		Svensson/Fasth	Cloetta Center	6,064	2–2–2	10
6	September 29	Luleå HF	0 – 1		Viktor Fasth	Coop Norrbotten Arena	4,269	2–3–2	10

October: 2–4–3 (Home: 1–2–1; Away: 1–2–2)
#	Date	Opponent	Score	OT	Goaltender	Venue	Attendance	Protocol	Pts	Ref
7	October 1	Brynäs IF	3 – 4		Viktor Fasth	Läkerol Arena	6,942	2–4–2	10
8	October 4	HV71	7 – 8	SO	Markus Svensson	Hovet	3,826	2–4–3	11
10	October 8	Skellefteå AIK	2 – 1		Viktor Fasth	Hovet	4,726	3–4–3	14
14	October 11	Frölunda HC	2 – 3	OT	Viktor Fasth	Scandinavium	7,566	3–4–4	15
11	October 13	Växjö Lakers HC	4 – 0		Viktor Fasth	Vida Arena	5,163	4–4–4	18
12	October 15	HV71	1 – 3		Viktor Fasth	Kinnarps Arena	6,766	4–5–4	18
13	October 18	Växjö Lakers HC	3 – 4		Viktor Fasth	Hovet	3,444	4–6–4	18
16	October 27	Timrå IK	4 – 3	SO	Viktor Fasth	E.ON Arena	4,088	4–6–5	20
17	October 29	Brynäs IF	0 – 4		Viktor Fasth	Hovet	6,385	4–7–5	20

November: 5–4–1 (Home: 3–2–0; Away: 2–2–1)
#	Date	Opponent	Score	OT	Goaltender	Venue	Attendance	Protocol	Pts	Ref
18	November 1	Skellefteå AIK	3 – 4		Viktor Fasth	Skellefteå Kraft Arena	4,841	4–8–5	20
19	November 3	Färjestad BK	3 – 2		Viktor Fasth	Hovet	4,602	5–8–5	23
20	November 5	Luleå HF	0 – 2		Viktor Fasth	Coop Norrbotten Arena	5,233	5–9–5	23
31	November 7	HV71	3 – 4		Fasth/Svensson	Hovet	3,337	5–10–5	23
15	November 14	Djurgårdens IF	5 – 0		Markus Svensson	Ericsson Globe	11,428	6–10–5	26
22	November 19	Modo Hockey	2 – 4		Viktor Fasth	Hovet	6,008	6–11–5	26
32	November 21	Brynäs IF	4 – 2		Viktor Fasth	Läkerol Arena	4,486	7–11–5	29
23	November 23	Timrå IK	5 – 4		Svensson/Fasth	Hovet	3,489	8–11–5	32
24	November 25	Modo Hockey	5 – 4		Viktor Fasth	Fjällräven Center	6,530	9–11–5	35
25	November 29	Växjö Lakers HC	0 – 1	SO	Viktor Fasth	Vida Arena	4,781	9–11–6	36

December: 2–2–2 (Home: 2–1–1; Away: 0–1–1)
#	Date	Opponent	Score	OT	Goaltender	Venue	Attendance	Protocol	Pts	Ref
26	December 1	Linköpings HC	3 – 2	OT	Viktor Fasth	Hovet	5,325	9–11–7	38
27	December 4	Skellefteå AIK	0 – 2		Viktor Fasth	Hovet	4,513	9–12–7	38
29	December 8	Färjestad BK	3 – 6		Markus Svensson	Löfbergs Lila Arena	7,771	9–13–7	38
30	December 10	Luleå HF	3 – 2		Viktor Fasth	Hovet	4,443	10–13–7	41
28	December 22	Djurgårdens IF	2 – 3	SO	Viktor Fasth	Ericsson Globe	13,850	10–13–8	42
33	December 28	Frölunda HC	6 – 2		Viktor Fasth	Hovet	6,469	11–13–8	45

January: 3–3–5 (Home: 3–1–2; Away: 0–2–3)
#	Date	Opponent	Score	OT	Goaltender	Venue	Attendance	Protocol	Pts	Ref
35	January 3	Brynäs IF	5 – 1		Viktor Fasth	Hovet	7,719	12–13–8	48
21	January 5	Linköpings HC	1 – 3		Viktor Fasth	Cloetta Center	7,710	12–14–8	48
34	January 10	Linköpings HC	3 – 0		Viktor Fasth	Hovet	4,018	13–14–8	51
37	January 12	HV71	3 – 2	OT	Viktor Fasth	Kinnarps Arena	6,580	13–14–9	53
38	January 14	Modo Hockey	3 – 6		Fasth/Svensson	Hovet	6,279	13–15–9	53
36	January 16	Frölunda HC	2 – 1	OT	Viktor Fasth	Scandinavium	8,114	13–15–10	55
39	January 19	Färjestad BK	3 – 0		Viktor Fasth	Hovet	4,565	14–15–10	58
40	January 21	Luleå HF	0 – 3		Viktor Fasth	Coop Norrbotten Arena	5,448	14–16–10	58
41	January 24	Timrå IK	0 – 1	OT	Viktor Fasth	E.ON Arena	4,317	14–16–11	59
42	January 26	Djurgårdens IF	4 – 3	OT	Viktor Fasth	Ericsson Globe	12,079	14–16–12	61
43	January 31	Växjö Lakers HC	3 – 2	SO	Viktor Fasth	Hovet	4,475	14–16–13	63

February: 5–2–2 (Home: 2–0–2; Away: 3–2–0)
#	Date	Opponent	Score	OT	Goaltender	Venue	Attendance	Protocol	Pts	Ref
44	February 2	Skellefteå AIK	1 – 2		Markus Svensson	Skellefteå Kraft Arena	4,432	14–17–13	63
45	February 4	Modo Hockey	5 – 1		Viktor Fasth	Fjällräven Center	7,233	15–17–13	66
46	February 14	HV71	3 – 4	SO	Markus Svensson	Hovet	4,218	15–17–14	67
47	February 16	Djurgårdens IF	4 – 1		Niklas Lundström	Ericsson Globe	10,061	16–17–14	70
48	February 18	Linköpings HC	4 – 2		Niklas Lundström	Hovet	6,021	17–17–14	73
49	February 21	Frölunda HC	0 – 1	SO	Viktor Fasth	Hovet	4,714	17–17–15	74
50	February 23	Färjestad BK	1 – 3		Viktor Fasth	Löfbergs Lila Arena	5,652	17–18–15	74
51	February 26	Timrå IK	8 – 2		Viktor Fasth	Hovet	5,695	18–18–15	77
52	February 28	Brynäs IF	4 – 2		Viktor Fasth	Läkerol Arena	7,027	19–18–15	80

March: 0–1–2 (Home: 0–0–2; Away: 0–1–0)
#	Date	Opponent	Score	OT	Goaltender	Venue	Attendance	Protocol	Pts	Ref
53	March 1	Luleå HF	0 – 1	OT	Markus Svensson	Hovet	5,411	19–18–16	81
54	March 3	Växjö Lakers HC	0 – 2		Markus Svensson	Vida Arena	5,329	19–19–16	81
55	March 6	Skellefteå AIK	2 – 3	SO	Viktor Fasth	Hovet	4,852	19–19–17	82

Legend: Win (3 points) Overtime/Shootout win (2 points) Loss (0 points) Overtime/Shootout loss (1 point)

=== Statistics ===
==== Players ====
Player	Team	GP	G	A	+/–	PIM	Pts

==== Goaltenders ====
Player	Team	GP	TOI	SOG	GA	SO	GAA	SV%

== Playoffs ==
In each series the better-seeded team gets home-ice advantage, meaning that they play four home games. Each series is a best-of-seven, where the team that wins four games advances to the next round. AIK is seeded 7th.

=== Game log ===
2012 Playoffs log: 7–5 (Home: 4–1; Away: 3–4)

Quarterfinals vs. (1) Luleå HF: 4–1 (Home: 2–0; Away: 2–1)
#	Date	Score	Goaltender	Venue	Attendance	Series	Ref
1	March 10	3 – 6	Viktor Fasth	Coop Norrbotten Arena	5,897	0–1
2	March 12	4 – 2	Viktor Fasth	Hovet	8,094	1–1
3	March 14	3 – 2	Viktor Fasth	Coop Norrbotten Arena	5,408	2–1
4	March 16	4 – 1	Viktor Fasth	Hovet	8,094	3–1
5	March 18	3 – 0	Viktor Fasth	Coop Norrbotten Arena	5,088	4–1

Semifinals vs. (2) Skellefteå AIK: 3–4 (Home: 2–1; Away: 1–3)
#	Date	Score	Goaltender	Venue	Attendance	Series	Ref
1	March 26	4 – 1	Viktor Fasth	Skellefteå Kraft Arena	5,541	1–0
2	March 28	4 – 5 OT	Viktor Fasth	Hovet	8,094	1–1
3	March 30	1 – 5	Fasth/Svensson	Skellefteå Kraft Arena	6,001	1–2
4	April 1	5 – 3	Viktor Fasth	Hovet	8,094	2–2
5	April 3	2 – 8	Viktor Fasth	Skellefteå Kraft Arena	6,001	2–3
6	April 5	2 – 1	Viktor Fasth	Hovet	8,094	3–3
7	April 7	3 – 5	Viktor Fasth	Skellefteå Kraft Arena	5,855	3–4

Legend: Win Loss

=== Statistics ===
==== Players ====
Player	Team	GP	G	A	+/–	PIM	Pts

==== Goaltenders ====
Player	Team	GP	TOI	SOG	GA	SO	GAA	SV%

== Transactions ==
AIK's pre-season started with Josh MacNevin, Viktor Fasth, Daniel Bång and Stefan Johansson extending their respective contracts mid-season by two years. Later a published interview revealed that goaltender Christopher Heino-Lindberg and winger Mattias Beck would leave the club prior to the 2011–12 season. A few days later Kent McDonell and Fredrik Carlsson extended their contracts by one year and two years respectively. A few days later it was announced that the junior players Eric Norin, Patric Gozzi, Henrik Nilsson, Mathias Franzén and Andreas Dahlström would be loaned to the HockeyAllsvenskan team Almtuna IS for the 2011–12 season, and then Johannes Salmonsson extended his contract by two years. In mid-April Fredrik Svensson, Victor Ahlström and Oscar Ahlström extended their respective contracts by one year; and shortly after, Linus Videll, Robert Rosén and Tobias Viklund—who all played in Elitserien in the 2010–11 season—were appointed. The appointment of Robert Rosén effectively re-united him and Josh MacNevin, as they played in the same team, Växjö Lakers Hockey, in the 2009–10 season. The same day as those appointments were made, AIK said goodbye to the two Slovak forwards Rastislav Pavlikovský and Richard Zedník, who were acquired mid-season. A few days later Johan P. Andersson left AIK and signed with Timrå IK, Mattias Beck—who had been loaned to Mora IK of the HockeyAllsvenskan (Swe-1) the previous season—signed with Mora IK, and Markus Svensson was presented as a new goaltender in AIK. On April 19, 2011, it was announced that Peter Nolander would leave AIK, as AIK had already found a replacement for him. Jonas Liwing then extended his contract with AIK a week later. In early May, Tobias Ericsson left AIK to sign with Mora IK, and a week later Filip Olsson left the AIK organization and signed with the Division 1 (Swe-2) club Mörrums IK. On May 9 it was announced that the Division 1 player Christopher Aspeqvist had signed a try-out contract with AIK. On September 1, 2011, Aspeqvist extended his contract with the club to one year.

On October 11, 2011, the acquired goaltender Markus Svensson was temporarily loaned to the Swe-1 team IK Oskarshamn for two games. A week later, junior player David Lillieström Karlsson signed a senior contract with AIK. Six days later, acquired forward Linus Videll was sold to Yugra Khanty-Mansiysk of the Kontinental Hockey League (KHL) after just 14 games, for financial reasons.

Acquired
Player	Former team	Date	Notes
Linus Videll	Södertälje SK	April 12	
Robert Rosén	Modo Hockey	April 12	
Tobias Viklund	Frölunda HC	April 12	
Markus Svensson	Malmö Redhawks	April 15	
Christopher Aspeqvist	Huddinge IK	September 1	
David Lillieström Karlsson	AIK J20	October 18	

Contract extensions
Player	Contract length	Date	Notes
Josh MacNevin	2 years	January 5	
Viktor Fasth	2 years	February 9	
Daniel Bång	2 years	February 10	
Stefan Johansson	2 years	March 21	
Josh MacNevin	2 years	March 25	
Fredrik Carlsson	2 years	March 25	
Kent McDonell	1 year	March 25	
Johannes Salmonsson	2 years	March 31	
Fredrik Svensson	1 year	April 11	
Victor Ahlström	1 year	April 11	
Oscar Ahlström	1 year	April 11	
Jonas Liwing	1 year	April 26	

Leaving AIK
Player	New team	Date	Notes
Christopher Heino-Lindberg	Nacka HK	March 20	
Mattias Beck	Mora IK	March 20	
Mikael Österberg	Unknown	April 12	
Rastislav Pavlikovský	Mora IK	April 12	
Richard Zedník	N/A	April 12	
Johan P. Andersson	Timrå IK	April 15	
Peter Nolander	Mora IK	April 19	
Tobias Ericsson	Mora IK	May 1	
Filip Olsson	Mörrums IK	May 9	

Loans
Player	New team	Date	Notes
Eric Norin	Almtuna IS	March 28	
Patric Gozzi	Almtuna IS	March 28	
Henrik Nilsson	Almtuna IS	March 28	
Mathias Franzén	Almtuna IS	March 28	
Andreas Dahlström	Almtuna IS	March 28	
Markus Svensson	IK Oskarshamn	October 11	

Leaving AIK mid-season
Player	New team	Date	Notes
Linus Videll	Yugra Khanty-Mansiysk	October 24	

== Final roster ==
No.	Nat	Player	Pos	S/G	Age	Acquired	Birthplace
86	(Sweden)	Oscar Ahlström	RW	L	39	2009	Farsta, Sweden
68	(Sweden)	Victor Ahlström	LW	L	39	2009	Farsta, Sweden
90	(Sweden)	Christopher Aspeqvist	D	R	35	2011	Huddinge, Sweden
20	(Sweden)	Daniel Bång	W	L	39	2004	Kista, Sweden
84	(Sweden)	Patric Blomdahl	W	L	42	2010	Stockholm, Sweden
17	(Sweden)	Fredrik Carlsson	D	L	37	2006	Täby, Sweden
30	(Sweden)	Viktor Fasth	G	L	44	2010	Kalix, Sweden
10	(Sweden)	Richard Gynge	RW	R	39	2009	Tyresö, Sweden
37	(Sweden)	Stefan Johansson	D	L	38	2008	Piteå, Sweden
22	(Sweden)	David Lillieström Karlsson	W	L	33	2009	Stockholm, Sweden
23	(Sweden)	Jonas Liwing	D	R	43	2008	Stockholm, Sweden
35	(Sweden)	Niklas Lundström	G	L	33	2009	Värmdö, Sweden
44	(Canada)	Josh MacNevin	D	R	49	2010	Calgary, Alberta
18	(Canada)	Kent McDonell	RW	R	47	2010	Williamstown, Ontario
12	(Sweden)	Patrik Nemeth	D	L	34	2008	Stockholm, Sweden
13	(Sweden)	Joakim Nordström	C	L	34	2008	Tyresö, Sweden
15	(Slovakia)	Rastislav Pavlikovsky	C	L	49	2011	Ilava, Czechoslovakia
87	(Sweden)	Robert Rosén	C	R	39	2011	Alvesta, Sweden
14	(Sweden)	Daniel Rudslätt (A)	LW	L	51	2010	Huddinge, Sweden
25	(Sweden)	Johannes Salmonsson	W	L	40	2010	Uppsala, Sweden
21	(Sweden)	Christian Sandberg (A)	C	R	38	2004	Järfälla, Sweden
45	(Sweden)	Oscar Steen	C	L	44	2010	Stockholm, Sweden
4	(Sweden)	Fredrik Svensson	D	L	51	2010	Stockholm, Sweden
29	(Sweden)	Markus Svensson	G	L	42	2011	Kalmar, Sweden
6	(Sweden)	Dick Tärnström (C)	D	L	51	2008	Stockholm, Sweden
16	(Sweden)	Tobias Viklund	D	L	40	2011	Kramfors, Sweden
