= Ahlström (surname) =

Ahlström is a Swedish surname. Notable people with the surname include:

- Anders Ahlström (1948–2019), Swedish footballer and football manager
- Anna Ahlström (1863–1943), Swedish teacher, principal, school founder
- Antti Ahlström (1827–1896), founder of the Ahlstrom Corporation
- Anton Ahlström (1890 –1932), a Finnish forest ranger and politician
- Bengt Ahlström (1924 – 2001), Finnish rower
- Emma Ahlström Köster (born 1987), Swedish politician
- Jacob Niclas Ahlström (1805–1857), Swedish composer
- Kattis Ahlström (born 1966), Swedish journalist and TV presenter
- Maire Ahlström (1907–1990), art collector and co-founder of the Artek furniture company
- Olof Åhlström (1756–1835), Swedish civil servant, composer and music publisher
- Oscar Ahlström (born 1986), Swedish professional ice hockey player
- Thomas Ahlström (born 1952), former Swedish footballer
- Tom Ahlström (born 1943), Swedish industrial designer
- Victor Ahlström (born 1986), Swedish professional ice hockey player
- Vilma Åhlström, Swedish curler

== See also ==
- Åhlström
- Ahlström family
- Ahlstrom (disambiguation)
