= Norin =

Norin is a surname. Notable people with the surname include:

- Alice Norin (born 1987), Norwegian-born Indonesian model, presenter, actress
- Carl-Henrik Norin (1920–1967), Swedish jazz saxophonist
- Eric Norin (born 1991), Swedish ice hockey player
- Georg Norin (1909–1967), German pharmacist
- Gull-Maj Norin (1913–1997), Danish actress
