= Åhlström =

Åhlström is a Swedish surname. Notable people with the surname include:

- Axel Åhlström (1891 – 1934), Finnish schoolteacher, journalist and politician
- Olof Åhlström (1756 – 1835), Swedish civil servant, composer and music publisher
- Vilma Åhlström (born 2000), Swedish female curler

== See also ==
- Ahlström (disambiguation)
- Ahlström (surname)
- Ahlstrom (disambiguation)
