= 2013–14 AIK IF season =

Swedish ice hockey club season

2013–14 AIK
- League: 10th SHL
- 2013–14 record: 12-30-6-7
- Goals for: 124
- Goals against: 171
- Arena: Hovet, Ericsson Globe

Team leaders
- Goals: Mattias Janmark-Nylen
- Assists: Jonas Liwing
- Points: Mattias Janmark-Nylen
- Penalty minutes: Mattias Janmark-Nylen
- Wins: Daniel Larsson
- Goals against average: Daniel Larsson

The 2013–14 AIK IF season was AIK's 30th season in the Swedish Hockey League (formerly known as Elitserien), the top division in Sweden. They finished in 10th place in the regular season and failed to qualify for the playoffs.

== Regular season ==
=== Standings ===
Updated as of March 8, 2014.

2013–14 SHL season	GP	W	L	OTW	OTL	GF	GA	GD	Pts
Skellefteå AIK^{y}	55	32	12	4	7	179	121	+58	111
Frölunda HC^{x}	55	29	15	4	7	153	123	+30	102
Växjö Lakers^{x}	55	23	14	7	11	156	130	+26	94
Brynäs IF^{x}	55	19	19	11	6	163	152	+11	85
Färjestad BK^{x}	55	21	19	7	8	143	134	+9	85
Luleå HF^{x}	55	22	21	6	6	136	115	+21	84
Leksands IF^{p}	55	23	23	5	4	118	155	–37	83
Modo Hockey^{p}	55	18	20	10	7	131	132	–1	81
Linköpings HC^{p}	55	20	24	7	4	174	167	+7	78
HV71^{p}	55	17	27	9	2	146	182	–36	71
Örebro HK^{r}	55	13	25	5	12	119	160	–41	61
AIK^{r}	55	12	30	6	7	124	171	–47	55

x – clinched playoff spot; y – clinched regular season league title; p – qualified for Play In; r – play in relegation series
