= Elsa-Marianne von Rosen =

Swedish dancer and actress

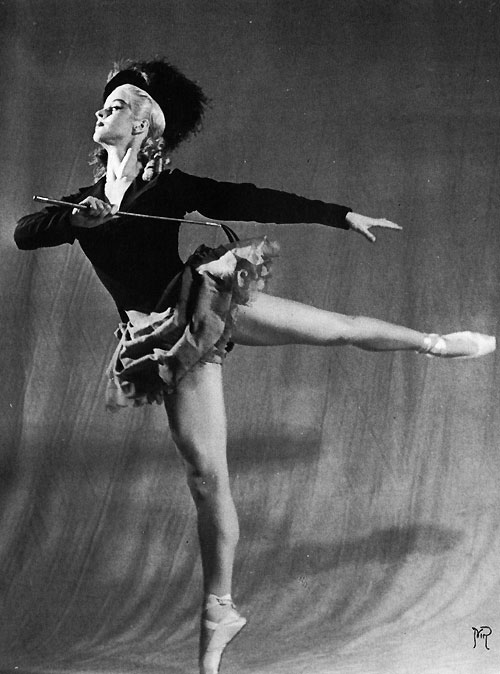
- Elsa-Marianne von Rosen (1950)
- Born: 21 April 1924; Stockholm, Sweden
- Died: 7 September 2014 (aged 90); Copenhagen, Denmark
- Occupations: Ballet dancer, choreographer, actress
- Spouse: Allan Fridericia
- Parents: Count Reinhold von Rosen; Elisabeth Österyd

Countess Elsa-Marianne von Rosen (21 April 1924 – 7 September 2014) was a Swedish ballet dancer, choreographer and actress.

== Biography ==
=== Family and education ===
Von Rosen was born in Stockholm. She was the daughter of the artist Count Reinhold von Rosen and Elisabeth Österyd, his first wife. A year after her birth, the family moved into Åkerö Manor, a lakeside castle in Södermanland. Von Rosen was educated at home by a governess and, later, attended a parish school. In 1934, she and her sister moved to their grandparents' home in Stockholm so that they could attend Anna Ahlström's School for Girls. While living with her grandmother, she took up ballet lessons with Vera Alexandrova. Her grandmother paid for her lessons with Alexandrova and with Otto Thoresen.

In 1950, von Rosen married editor Allan Fridericia (1921–1991). Soon after, they moved to Denmark.

=== Career ===
In 1950s, she appeared in the television series Tales of Hans Anderson.

She performed all over Scandinavia. She acted between 1939 and 1970. She also directed ballet plays outside of Scandinavia, in Monaco, the United States, the United Kingdom and Russia. She was the head of ballet at the Stora Teatern in Gothenburg between 1970 and 1976 and also of Malmöbaletten between 1980 and 1987.

In 1984, she was given the Royal Medal of Merit Litteris et Artibus.

=== Death ===
She died from natural causes on 7 September 2014 in Copenhagen. She was 90 years old.

== Filmography ==
- 1939: Skanör-Falsterbo
- 1940: Kyss henne!
- 1941: Det sägs på stan
- 1950: Ung och kär
- 1954: Balettprogram
- 1957: Med glorian på sned
- 1958: Jazzgossen
- 1959: Fröken Julie
- 1967: Lorden från gränden
- 1970: The Only Way
