= Sebastian Fakt =

Swedish ice hockey player

- Born: July 25, 1995 (age 29); Sweden
- Height: 6 ft 0 in (183 cm)
- Weight: 183 lb (83 kg; 13 st 1 lb)
- Position: Forward
- Shoots: Left
- Allsvenskan team Former teams: Almtuna IS; Leksands IF; Aalborg Pirates
- NHL draft: Undrafted
- Playing career: 2013–present

Sebastian Fakt (born July 25, 1995) is a Swedish ice hockey player. He is currently playing with Almtuna IS of the HockeyAllsvenskan.

Fakt made his Swedish Hockey League debut playing with Leksands IF during the 2013–14 SHL season.
