= Christopher Aspeqvist =

Swedish ice hockey player

- Born: November 9, 1990 (age 35) Huddinge, Sweden
- Height: 6 ft 0 in (183 cm)
- Weight: 201 lb (91 kg; 14 st 5 lb)
- Position: Defence
- Shot: Right
- Played for: Visby/Roma HK; Huddinge IK; AIK IF; Södertälje SK; Almtuna IS; Diables Rouges de Briançon
- Playing career: 2009–2016

Christopher Aspeqvist (born November 9, 1990) is a Swedish professional ice hockey defenceman, currently an unrestricted free agent. He has formerly played with AIK IF in the Swedish Hockey League (SHL).

== Playing career ==
Aspeqvist was born in Huddinge, although he grew up with Djurgårdens IF. He played several seasons with Djurgården's under-18 team in J18 Elit, as well as with their under-20 team in J20 SuperElit. In the 2008–09 season, senior team Visby/Roma HK of the Swedish Division 1 recalled him on two occasions for play in their team, recording one assist.

He signed his first pro-contract with Huddinge IK of the Division 1 prior to the 2009–10 season to return to his birthplace of Huddinge. His major turning point came in the 2010–11 season, however, with the same team. Scoring 12 goals and 19 points in 38 games, as well as demonstrating good defensive play, he drew attention from AIK of the Swedish Elitserien. He signed a try-out contract with AIK in May 2011, and three months later he extended his contract to the end of the 2011–12 Elitserien season.

== Career statistics ==
			Regular season					Playoffs
Season	Team	League	GP	G	A	Pts	PIM	GP	G	A	Pts	PIM
2005–06	Huddinge IK U16	U16 SM	3	1	0	1	0	—	—	—	—	—
2006–07	Djurgårdens IF J18	J18 Elit	17	1	5	6	16	—	—	—	—	—
2006–07	Djurgårdens IF J18	J18 Allsvenskan	1	0	0	0	0	—	—	—	—	—
2007–08	Djurgårdens IF J18	J18 Elit	14	2	3	5	4	—	—	—	—	—
2007–08	Djurgårdens IF J18	J18 Allsvenskan	4	1	0	1	0	8	1	2	3	6
2007–08	Djurgårdens IF J20	J20 SuperElit	—	—	—	—	—	1	0	0	0	2
2008–09	Djurgårdens IF J20	J20 SuperElit	31	2	4	6	18	—	—	—	—	—
2008–09	Visby/Roma HK	Division 1	2	0	1	1	2	—	—	—	—	—
2008–09	Huddinge IK J20	J20 SuperElit	10	1	3	4	6	3	0	0	0	0
2009–10	Huddinge IK J20	J20 SuperElit	6	0	0	0	0	—	—	—	—	—
2009–10	Huddinge IK	Division 1	33	5	13	18	6	2	1	0	1	0
2010–11	Huddinge IK	Division 1	38	12	7	19	12	10	2	2	4	6
2011–12	AIK IF	Elitserien	41	2	1	3	6	7	0	1	1	0
2012–13	AIK IF	Elitserien	42	1	1	2	8	—	—	—	—	—
2012–13	Södertälje SK	HockeyAllsvenskan	3	0	0	0	2	—	—	—	—	—
2013–14	AIK IF J20	J20 SuperElit	1	0	1	1	0	—	—	—	—	—
2013–14	AIK IF	SHL	51	2	2	4	12	—	—	—	—	—
2014–15	Södertälje SK	HockeyAllsvenskan	24	0	1	1	14	—	—	—	—	—
2014–15	Almtuna IS	HockeyAllsvenskan	7	0	0	0	4	—	—	—	—	—
2015–16	Diables Rouges de Briançon	Ligue Magnus	26	5	9	14	10	—	—	—	—	—
SHL (Elitserien) totals			134	5	4	9	26	7	0	1	1	0
HockeyAllsvenskan totals			34	0	1	1	20	—	—	—	—	—
Division 1 totals			73	17	21	38	20	12	3	2	5	6
Ligue Magnus totals			26	5	9	14	10	—	—	—	—	—
