= Filip Olsson =

Filip Olsson may refer to:

- Filip Olsson (ice hockey)
- Filip Olsson (footballer)
