= Fredrik Svensson =

Fredrik Svensson may refer to:

- Fredrik Svensson (ice hockey) (born 1975), Swedish ice hockey defenceman
- Fredrik Svensson (racewalker) (born 1973), Swedish race walker
- Fredrik Svensson (presenter) (born 1990), Swedish television personality and presenter
