= Andreas Dahlström =

Swedish ice hockey player (born 1991)

Andreas Dahlstrom
- Born: June 22, 1991 (age 34) Flemingsberg, Sweden
- Height: 6 ft 0 in (183 cm)
- Weight: 190 lb (86 kg; 13 st 8 lb)
- Position: Centre
- Shot: Left
- Played for: AIK IF
- NHL draft: 161st overall, 2010; Anaheim Ducks
- Playing career: 2009–2019

Andreas Dahlström (born June 22, 1991) is a Swedish former professional ice hockey centre. He ended his career with hometown club, Flemingsbergs IK in the Swedish Division 2. He formerly played one game with AIK of the Elitserien in the 2011-12 season. He was selected by the Anaheim Ducks in the 6th round (161st overall) of the 2010 NHL entry draft.

== Career statistics ==
			Regular season					Playoffs
Season	Team	League	GP	G	A	Pts	PIM	GP	G	A	Pts	PIM
2007–08	AIK IF J18	J18 Elit	21	5	10	15	12	—	—	—	—	—
2007–08	AIK IF J18	J18 Allsvenskan	4	1	0	1	4	—	—	—	—	—
2007–08	AIK IF J20	J20 SuperElit	9	1	2	3	8	—	—	—	—	—
2008–09	AIK IF J18	J18 Elit	2	2	1	3	0	—	—	—	—	—
2008–09	AIK IF J18	J18 Allsvenskan	9	4	8	12	33	7	2	11	13	31
2008–09	AIK IF J20	J20 SuperElit	28	5	5	10	67	—	—	—	—	—
2008–09	AIK IF	HockeyAllsvenskan	4	0	0	0	0	—	—	—	—	—
2009–10	AIK IF J20	J20 SuperElit	5	4	6	10	2	—	—	—	—	—
2009–10	AIK IF	HockeyAllsvenskan	6	1	2	3	4	—	—	—	—	—
2010–11	AIK IF J20	J20 SuperElit	18	4	6	10	6	—	—	—	—	—
2011–12	AIK IF	Elitserien	1	0	0	0	0	—	—	—	—	—
2011–12	Almtuna IS	HockeyAllsvenskan	30	1	1	2	6	—	—	—	—	—
2011–12	Wings HC Arlanda	Division 1	11	0	3	3	2	2	0	1	1	0
2012–13	Kallinge-Ronneby IF	Hockeyettan	44	7	18	25	6	5	0	2	2	4
2013–14	Kallinge-Ronneby IF	Hockeyettan	41	5	26	31	35	8	1	5	6	0
2014–15	Kallinge-Ronneby IF	Hockeyettan	35	7	19	26	10	2	1	0	1	0
2015–16	Kallinge-Ronneby IF	Hockeyettan	36	5	10	15	26	—	—	—	—	—
2016–17	Flemingsbergs IK	Division 3	31	31	40	71	33	—	—	—	—	—
2017–18	Flemingsbergs IK	Division 2	25	13	27	40	8	—	—	—	—	—
2018–19	Flemingsbergs IK	Division 2	3	0	1	1	0	—	—	—	—	—
Elitserien totals			1	0	0	0	0	—	—	—	—	—
HockeyAllsvenskan totals			40	2	3	5	10	—	—	—	—	—
Hockeyettan totals			167	24	76	100	79	17	2	8	10	4
