= Patric Gozzi =

Swedish ice hockey player

- Born: May 6, 1991 (age 34) Stockholm, Sweden
- Height: 5 ft 11 in (180 cm)
- Weight: 185 lb (84 kg; 13 st 3 lb)
- Position: Centre
- Shot: Right
- Played for: AIK; Almtuna IS; Wings HC Arlanda; IF Vallentuna BK; IFK Österåker
- Playing career: 2010–2016

Patric Gozzi (born May 6, 1991) is a Swedish professional ice hockey player, currently playing with Almtuna IS in the HockeyAllsvenskan. He played with AIK IF in the Elitserien during the 2010–11 Elitserien season.

He is the son of Anders Gozzi and brother to Christoffer Gozzi.

== Career statistics ==
			Regular season					Playoffs
Season	Team	League	GP	G	A	Pts	PIM	GP	G	A	Pts	PIM
2007–08	AIK IF J18	J18 Elit	19	2	3	5	0	—	—	—	—	—
2007–08	AIK IF J18	J18 Allsvenskan	13	2	1	3	4	—	—	—	—	—
2007–08	AIK IF J20	J20 SuperElit	8	1	0	1	4	—	—	—	—	—
2008–09	AIK IF J18	J18 Elit	17	7	15	22	20	—	—	—	—	—
2008–09	AIK IF J18	J18 Allsvenskan	12	4	10	14	8	7	2	1	3	2
2008–09	AIK IF J20	J20 SuperElit	21	2	8	10	6	—	—	—	—	—
2009–10	AIK IF J20	J20 SuperElit	40	4	10	14	8	5	0	0	0	2
2009–10	AIK IF	HockeyAllsvenskan	1	0	0	0	0	—	—	—	—	—
2010–11	AIK IF J20	J20 SuperElit	42	10	29	39	37	—	—	—	—	—
2010–11	AIK IF	Elitserien	4	0	1	1	0	—	—	—	—	—
2011–12	AIK IF	Elitserien	2	0	0	0	0	—	—	—	—	—
2011–12	Almtuna IS	HockeyAllsvenskan	33	0	1	1	29	—	—	—	—	—
2011–12	Wings HC Arlanda	Division 1	13	6	8	14	2	2	0	0	0	0
2012–13	Wings HC Arlanda	Hockeyettan	41	4	22	26	10	2	0	0	0	0
2013–14	IF Vallentuna BK J20	J20 Div.1	1	0	0	0	0	—	—	—	—	—
2013–14	IF Vallentuna BK	Division 1	41	1	15	16	20	—	—	—	—	—
2015–16	IFK Österåker	Division 3	6	3	5	8	8	—	—	—	—	—
Elitserien totals			6	0	1	1	0	—	—	—	—	—
HockeyAllsvenskan totals			34	0	1	1	29	—	—	—	—	—
Hockeyettan (Division 1) totals			95	11	45	56	32	4	0	0	0	0
