= Ahlström =

Ahlström may refer to:

- Ahlström family
- Ahlström (surname)
- Ahlstrom-Munksjö, manufacturer of fiber-based products, headquartered in Finland; founded by Antti Ahlström

== See also ==
- Ahlstrom (disambiguation)
