= Mathias Franzén (ice hockey) =

Swedish ice hockey player

- Born: 20 June 1992 (age 32); Huddinge, Sweden
- Height: 5 ft 9 in (175 cm)
- Weight: 159 lb (72 kg; 11 st 5 lb)
- Position: Wing
- Shoots: Right
- HA team Former teams: Almtuna IS; AIK
- Playing career: 2010–present

Mathias Franzén (born 20 June 1992) is a Swedish professional ice hockey player, currently playing with Almtuna IS in the HockeyAllsvenskan. He played with AIK IF in the Elitserien (SEL) during the 2010–11 Elitserien season.
