= Visby ishall =

Indoor ice hockey venue in Visby, Sweden

Coordinates: 57.6264°N 18.3297°E

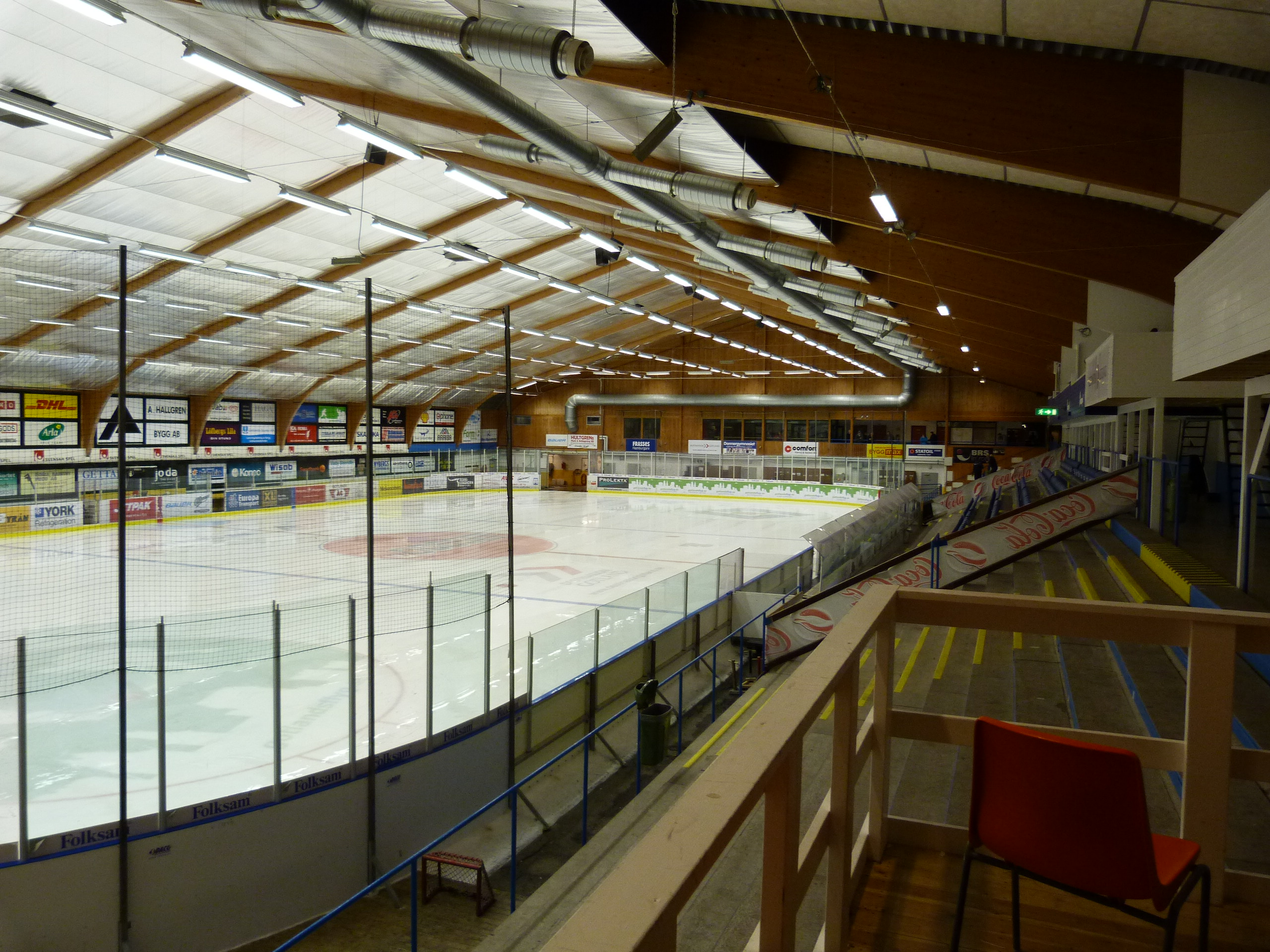
- Interactive map of Visby ishall
- Location: Visby, Gotland, Sweden
- Capacity: 2000

Construction
- Opened: 1975

Tenant
- Visby/Roma HK (HockeyAllsvenskan) (2001–present)

Visby ishall is an indoor ice hockey venue located in Visby, Sweden. It was built in 1975 and has a capacity of 2000 spectators. It is the home venue for Visby/Roma HK. The venue has stands and seats on one long side of the rink.
