= Christoffer Gozzi =

Swedish ice hockey player

- Born: May 8, 1993 (age 31); Sweden
- Height: 57 ft 8 in (1,758 cm)
- Weight: 170 lb (77 kg; 12 st 2 lb)
- Position: Forward
- Shoots: Right
- Elitserien team: AIK IF
- NHL draft: Undrafted
- Playing career: 2013–present

Christoffer Gozzi (born May 8, 1993) is a Swedish ice hockey player. He made his Elitserien debut playing with AIK IF during the 2012–13 Elitserien season.

He is the son of Anders Gozzi and brother to Patric Gozzi.
