= Johan Andersson (ice hockey, born 1987) =

Swedish professional ice hockey centre

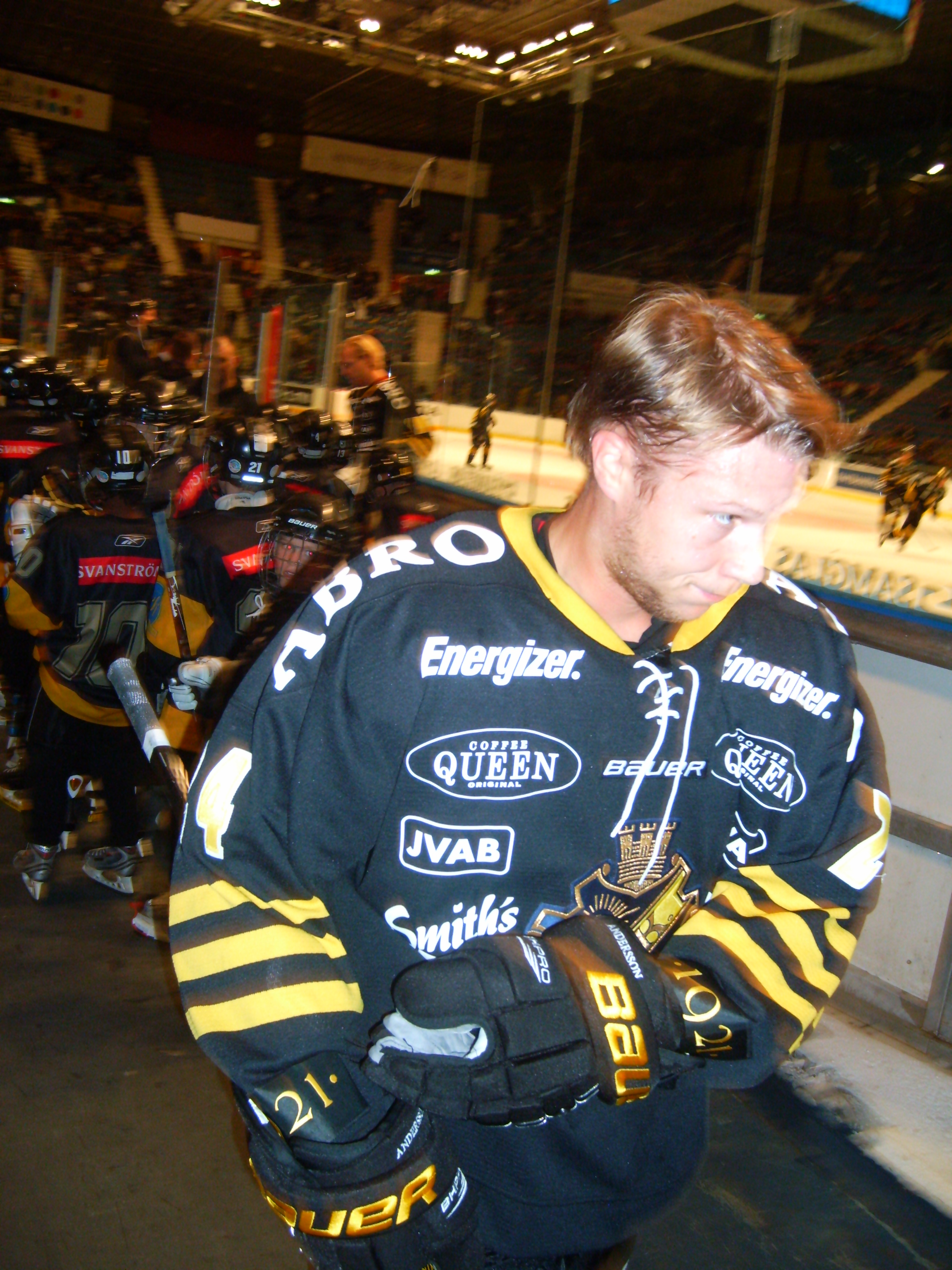
- Born: May 2, 1987 (age 39) Nynäshamn, Sweden
- Height: 5 ft 11 in (180 cm)
- Weight: 198 lb (90 kg; 14 st 2 lb)
- Position: Centre
- Shoots: Left
- FRA Div 2 team Former teams: Spartiates de Marseille; Södertälje SK; Hammarby IF; Almtuna IS; AIK; Timrå IK; Rungsted Seier Capital; Ducs de Dijon; Dundee Stars
- NHL draft: Undrafted
- Playing career: 2006–present

Johan Per Erik Andersson (born May 2, 1987) is a Swedish professional ice hockey centre currently playing for Spartiates de Marseille of the FFHG Division 2 in France.

== Playing career ==
Andersson played his under-20 (U20) hockey with Södertälje SK, he started out with the under-18 (U18) team during the 2003–04 season in the J18 Allsvenskan. During that season he also played 9 games with the Södertälje SK under-20 team in the J20 SuperElit league.

In 2004-05 he split time between the U18 and U20 teams again as well as playing for Sweden in the IIHF World U18 Championship and 16 other international games for Sweden.

2005-06 saw Andersson make his SHL (Elitserien) debut with Södertälje SK, playing one game in the top-level league. He spent the remainder of 2005–06 with the U20 team and played for Sweden U20 and Sweden U19 teams.

Andersson played for Södertälje SK again in 2006-07 splitting time between J20 SuperElit and the HockeyAllsvenskan.

In 2007-08 Andersson signed with Hammarby IF and played the full season in HockeyAllsvenskan, however the team went bankrupt after the season and he was forced to move on to Almtuna IS for 2008–09.

After two years with Almtuna IS playing in the HockeyAllsvenskan he signed a one-year contract with AIK to play in the SHL (Elitserien at the time) for 2010-11 Andersson then signed a one-year contract with Timrå for the 2011-12 in which he only played 11 games including the Kvalserien.

Having left Timrå after the Kvalserien in which Timrå were relegated to HockeyAllsvenskan, Andersson went back to Södertälje SK to a one-year contract for the 2012-13 season. Andersson then re-signed with Södertälje SK for the 2013-14 season.

Andersson has since had spells with AIK, Rungsted Seier Capital, Ducs de Dijon, two seasons with Dundee Stars - whom he captained in 2018-19 - and Marseille.

== Career statistics ==
Updated November 28, 2013

| | | | Regular season | | | | | Playoffs |
| Season | Team | League | GP | G | A | Pts | PIM | GP | G | A | Pts | PIM |
|---|---|---|---|---|---|---|---|---|---|---|---|---|---|
| 2003-04 | Södertälje SK J18 | J18 Allsvenskan | 8 | 4 | 2 | 6 | 4 | 2 | 0 | 0 | 0 | 0 |
| | Södertälje SK J20 | J20 SuperElit | 9 | 2 | 1 | 3 | 10 | 2 | 0 | 0 | 0 | 0 |
| 2004-05 | Södertälje SK J18 | J18 Allsvenskan | 3 | 3 | 6 | 9 | 8 | 1 | 0 | 0 | 0 | 0 |
| | Södertälje SK J20 | J20 SuperElit | 34 | 12 | 20 | 32 | 12 | 3 | 2 | 0 | 2 | 4 |
| | Sweden U18 | 2004 IIHF World U18 Championships | 7 | 0 | 2 | 2 | 0 | - | - | - | - | - |
| | Sweden U18 | International | 16 | 2 | 6 | 8 | 27 | - | - | - | - | - |
| 2005-06 | Södertälje SK J20 | J20 SuperElit | 41 | 6 | 16 | 22 | 40 | 3 | 0 | 1 | 1 | 0 |
| | Södertälje SK | SHL | 1 | 0 | 0 | 0 | 0 | 0 | - | - | - | - | - |
| | Sweden U19 | International | 3 | 0 | 1 | 1 | 4 | - | - | - | - | - |
| | Sweden U20 | International | 3 | 0 | 0 | 0 | 0 | - | - | - | - | - |
| 2006-07 | Södertälje SK J20 | J20 SuperElit | 40 | 20 | 25 | 45 | 26 | 3 | 1 | 1 | 2 | 2 |
| | Södertälje SK | HockeyAllsvenskan | 12 | 0 | 0 | 0 | 0 | - | - | - | - | - |
| 2007-08 | Hammarby IF | HockeyAllsvenskan | 41 | 7 | 19 | 26 | 68 | - | - | - | - | - |
| 2008-09 | Almtuna IS | HockeyAllsvenskan | 45 | 11 | 28 | 39 | 12 | 6 | 0 | 2 | 2 | 2 |
| 2009-10 | Almtuna IS | HockeyAllsvenskan | 45 | 12 | 15 | 27 | 10 | 10 | 1 | 3 | 4 | 6 |
| 2010-11 | AIK | SHL | 48 | 10 | 9 | 19 | 20 | 7 | 0 | 2 | 2 | 0 |
| 2011-12 | Timrå IK | SHL | 7 | 1 | 0 | 1 | 2 | 4 | 0 | 2 | 2 | 4 |
| 2012-13 | Södertälje SK | HockeyAllsvenskan | 31 | 10 | 7 | 17 | 14 | 8 | 0 | 1 | 1 | 0 |
| SHL Totals | | | 56 | 11 | 9 | 20 | 22 | 11 | 0 | 4 | 4 | 4 |
| HockeyAllsvenskan Totals | | | 174 | 40 | 69 | 109 | 104 | 24 | 1 | 6 | 7 | 8 |
| J20 SuperElit Totals | | | 124 | 40 | 62 | 102 | 88 | 11 | 3 | 2 | 5 | 6 |
