= Weil am Rhein =

- Town
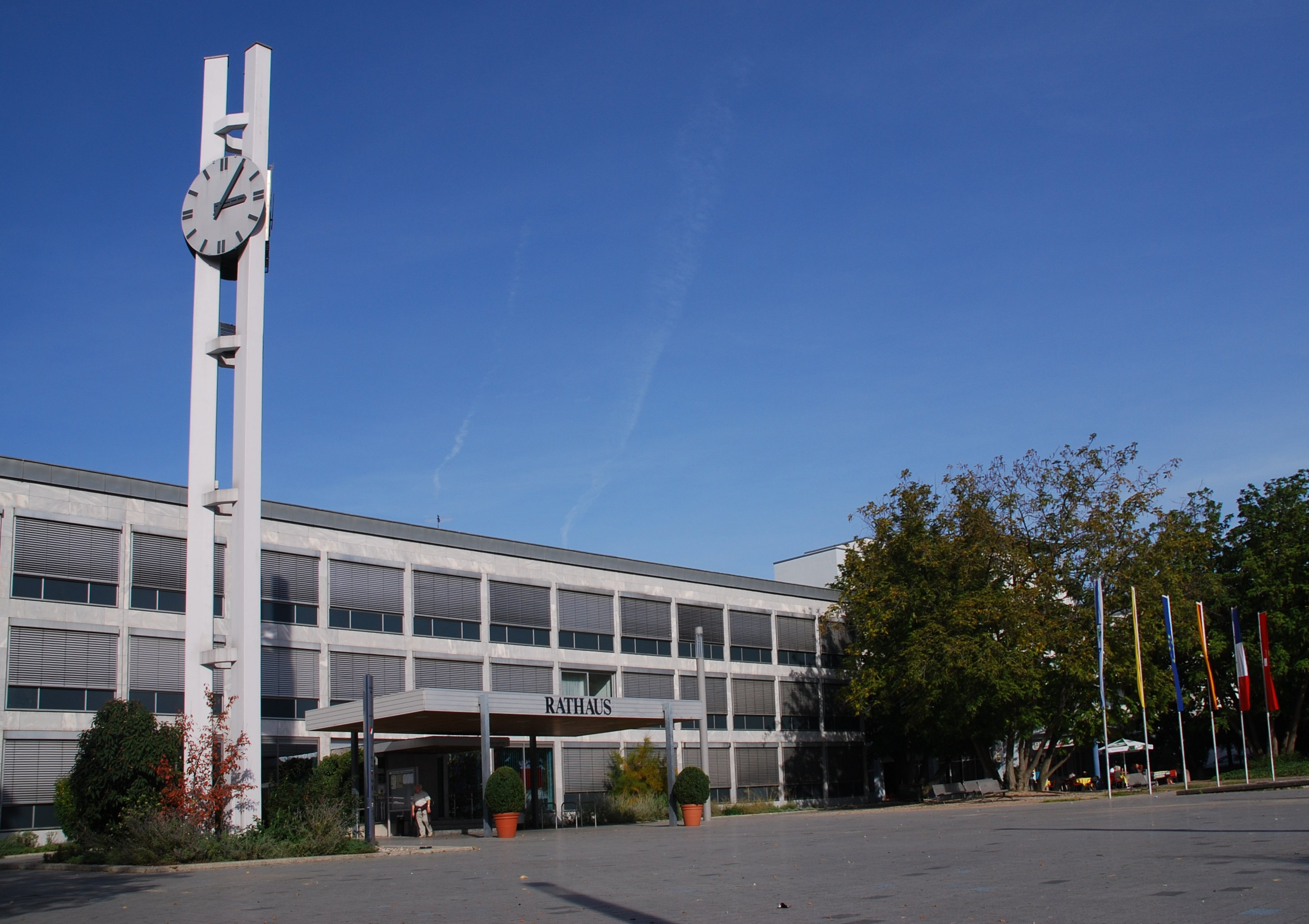
- Townhall and market place of Weil am Rhein

- Coat of arms

- Location of Weil am Rhein within Lörrach district
- Interactive map of Weil am Rhein
- Location within Germany Location within Baden-Württemberg
- Coordinates: 47°35′41″N 7°36′39″E
- Country: Germany
- State: Baden-Württemberg
- Admin. region: Freiburg
- District: Lörrach
- Subdivisions: 7

Government
  - Mayor (2024–32): Diana Stöcker (CDU)

Area
  - Total: 19.47 km^{2} (7.52 sq mi)
- Elevation: 281 m (922 ft)

Population (2025-12-31)
  - Total: 32,361
  - Density: 1,662/km^{2} (4,305/sq mi)
- Time zone: UTC+01:00 (CET)
  - Summer (DST): UTC+02:00 (CEST)
- Postal codes: 79546–79576
- Dialling codes: 07621
- Vehicle registration: LÖ
- Website: www.weil-am-rhein.de

Weil am Rhein (German pronunciation: [ˈvaɪl ʔam ˈʁaɪn], lit. 'Weil on the Rhine'; High Alemannic: Wiil am Rhii) is a German town and commune. It is on the east bank of the River Rhine, and extends to the tripoint of Switzerland, France, and Germany. It is the most southwesterly town in Germany and a suburb in the Trinational Eurodistrict of Basel. The town has around 30,000 inhabitants, and the Eurodistrict metropolitan area has about 830,000.

== Geography ==
Weil am Rhein

Climate chart (precipitation, max. and min. temperature)
J	F	M	A	M	J	J	A	S	O	N	D
55 5 −1	51 7 −1	49 11 2	66 15 4	85 20 8	88 23 12	79 25 14	78 25 14	74 21 11	66 16 7	56 9 2	71 6 0
- █ Average max. and min. temperatures in °C
- █ Precipitation totals in mm
- Source: The National Centers for Environmental Information (NCEI)
Imperial conversion
J	F	M	A	M	J	J	A	S	O	N	D
2.2 40 30	2 44 30	1.9 53 36	2.6 59 40	3.3 67 47	3.5 73 53	3.1 78 57	3.1 77 56	2.9 70 51	2.6 60 45	2.2 48 36	2.8 42 32
- █ Average max. and min. temperatures in °F
- █ Precipitation totals in inches

Weil am Rhein is located at 47°35′42″N 7°36′39.6″E in the district of Lörrach in the German state of Baden-Württemberg. The city limits border France to the west and Switzerland to the south including the tripoint of the three countries. Locally, Weil is situated in the region referred to as Markgräflerland.

The city's location on the Rhine and proximity to the Black Forest give it a continental climate, particularly suited to viticulture.

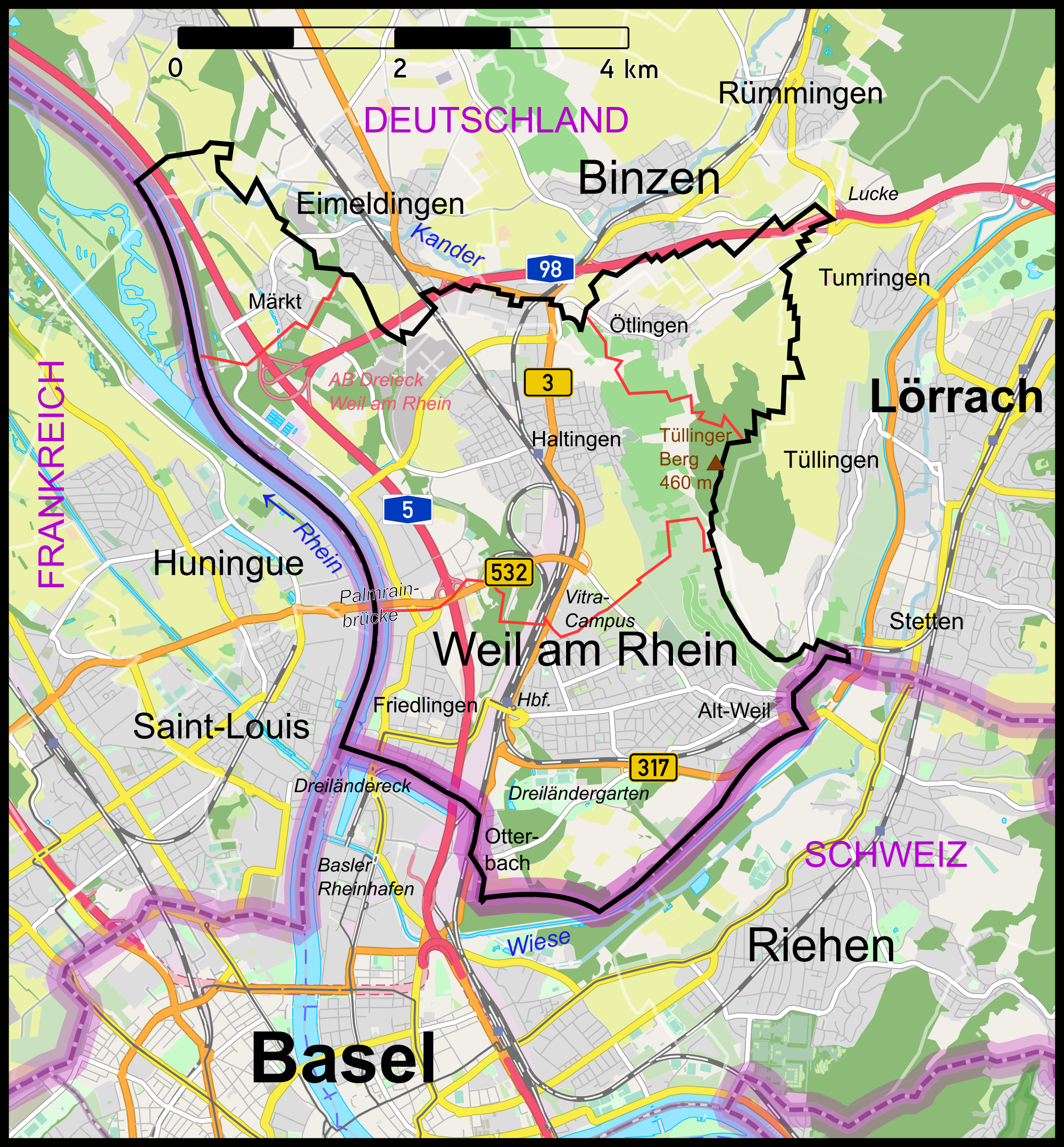
Map of Weil am Rhein

== History ==
The town is first documented in the year 786 as Willa, a name which is thought to be of Roman origin. The duc de Villars crossed the Rhine here in October 1702 to fight the Battle of Friedlingen during the War of the Spanish Succession. Weil was severely damaged as a result of the conflict.

Agriculture dominated local industry until the 19th century, when the city began to grow, aided by its favourable transport connections. A railway marshalling yard linking Weil am Rhein to Basel was built in 1913. Swiss textile factories were established in the Friedlingen quarter. 1934 saw the construction of a harbour on the Rhine.

After the Second World War the population again grew rapidly due to the influx of refugees and stateless persons. Between 1971 and 1975 the communities of Ötlingen, Haltingen and Märkt were incorporated and Weil am Rhein became a substantial town.

Since 2014, line 8 of the Basel tram system has extended across the border from Switzerland to terminate in Weil am Rhein.

An archaeologist found a bronze helmet nearby.

== Mergers ==
The former municipalities were merged into Weil am Rhein:

- 1 December 1971: Ötlingen
- 1 January 1975: Haltingen and Märkt

Coat of arms of the former municipalities

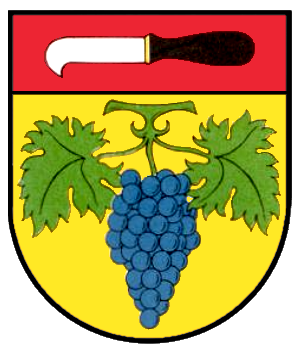
Haltingen

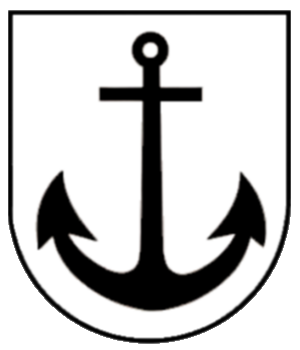
Märkt

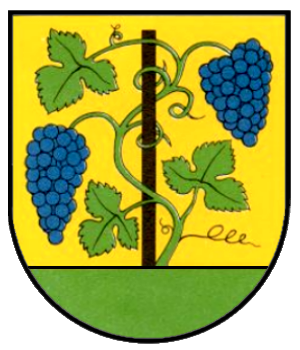
Ötlingen

== Twin towns – sister cities ==
Weil am Rhein is twinned with:

- Bognor Regis, United Kingdom
- Huningue, France
- Trebbin, Germany

== Tourism and leisure ==
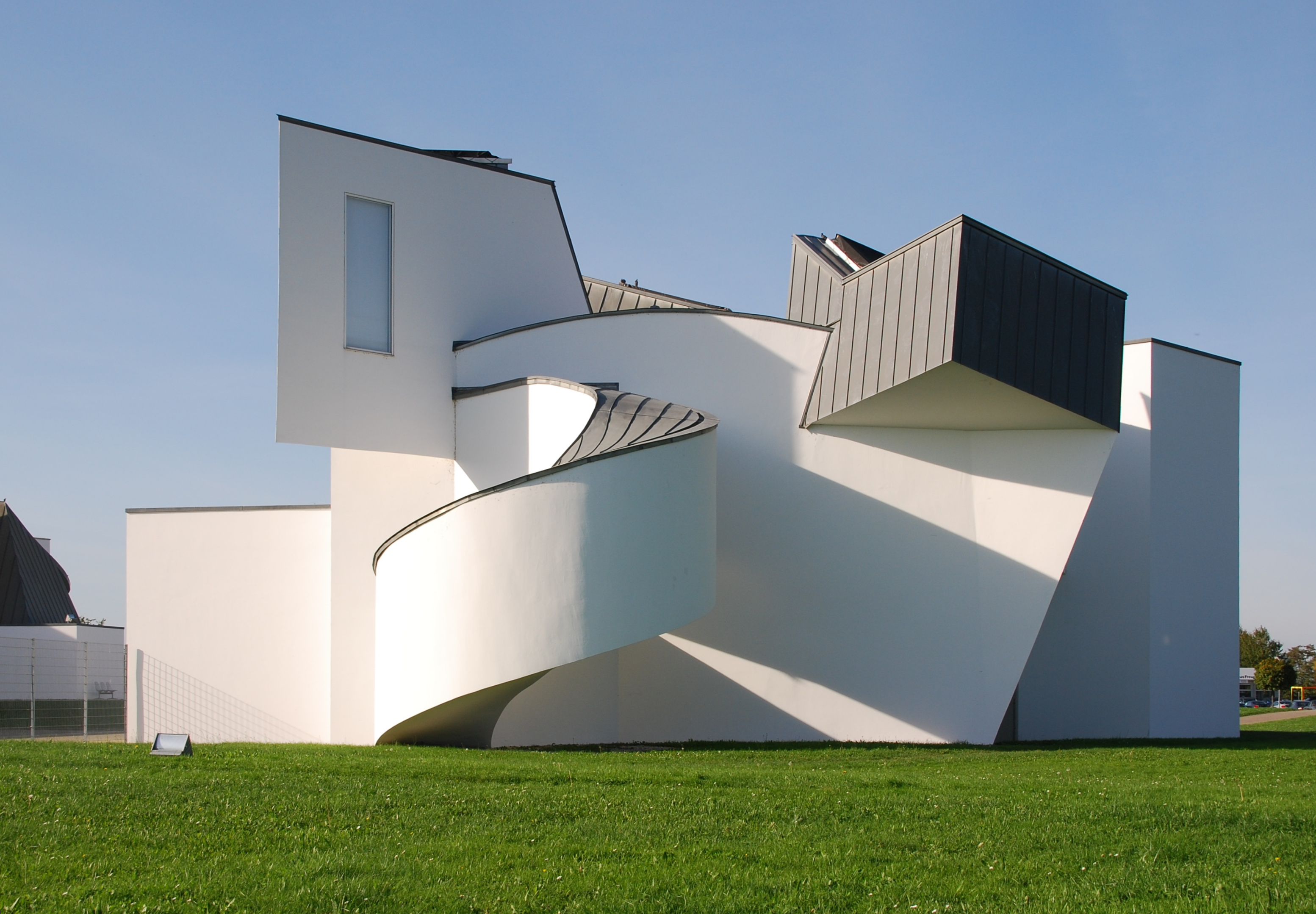
Vitra Design Museum

- The premises of the furniture maker Vitra, featuring buildings by architects such as Frank Gehry, Zaha Hadid and Tadao Ando, are an attraction for architecture fans. The premises also include the Vitra Design Museum.
- The Laguna water park
- Landesgartenschau Baden-Württemberg 1999, "Grün 99"

== Notable people ==
- Enjott Schneider (born 1950), composer and writer
- Patrik Köbele (born 1962), politician, President of the German Communist Party (DKP)
- Christian Streich (born 1965), football player and manager

=== Associated with Weil am Rhein ===
- Erwin Bowien (1899–1972), painter and writer
- Hubert Schardin (1902–1965), physicist, lived in Weil am Rhein
- Artimus Pyle (born 1948), Lynyrd Skynyrd drummer, traces his ancestry to Weil am Rhein through Claus Koger (1572–1630)
- Martin Beneke (born 1966), physicist, completed his schooling at the Kant-Gymnasium in Weil am Rhein
- Georg Norin (died 1967), pharmacist

== See also ==
- Ötlingen (Weil am Rhein)
