= Georg Norin =

German pharmacist (1909–1967)

Georg Norin was a Nazi pharmacist implicated in the genocidal killings at Auschwitz. He was a member of the Concentration Camps Inspectorate (IKL), the unit which oversaw the medical experiments of the Waffen SS Hygiene Unit. He is alleged to have associated with Josef Mengele and other Nazi doctors who ordered the selections to the gas chambers, where Zyklon B was used to kill the prisoners, mainly the Jews.

His record shows 31.08.1909.4 142 648. SS-Sturmbannführer-promotion on 09.11.1943, SS-Sturmbannführer d.R. Waffen-SS–promotion on 09.11.1943. He died 1967 in Weil am Rhein, Germany.
