= Jacob Niclas Ahlström =

Swedish Kapellmeister and composer (1805–1857)

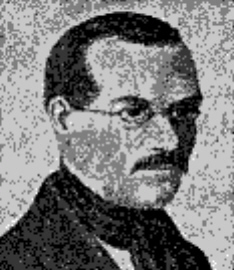

Background information
- Born: 5 June 1805; Visby, Gotland
- Died: 14 May 1857 (aged 51) Stockholm
- Occupations: Kapellmeister and composer

Jacob Niclas Ahlström (5 June 1805 in Visby, Gotland – 14 May 1857 in Stockholm) was a Swedish Kapellmeister and composer.

Beginning his studies at Uppsala University in 1824, Ahlström dropped out due to lack of money and joined a touring theatrical troupe. From 1832 to 1842, he served as a cathedral organist and music teacher in Västerås and then became a Court Kapellmeister and organist in Stockholm until his death. In 1845, he held a concert in Berlin, during which he played Swedish folk songs and dances. During the years 1842 to 1854 Ahlström worked at the Nya theater in Stockholm where he wrote music in various genres for more than one hundred theatrical works.

Ahlström composed two operas based on libretti by Frans Hedberg, incidental music (for plays such as Agne, Positivhalaren, Ringaren i Notre Dame, and Hinko och Urdur), a vocal symphony, chamber music, and lieder. Together with Per Conrad Boman, he published Svenska folksånger, folkdanser och folklekar, the best-known collection of Swedish folk songs which appeared during the 19th century. In 1852, he also published the Musikalisk fickordbok (Musical Pocket Book), which enjoyed several reissues.
