= Anders Ahlström =

Swedish footballer and football manager (1948–2019)

Personal information
- Full name: Anders Ahlström
- Date of birth: 1 August 1948
- Date of death: 13 June 2019 (aged 70)
- Position: Forward

Senior career*
Years	Team	Apps	(Gls)
–1967	Skutskärs IK		
1967–1972	Brynäs IF	95	(50)
1972–1973	Djurgårdens IF	27	(10)
1973–1978	Brynäs IF	111	(20)

International career
1972	Sweden U23	1	(1)
1972	Sweden	1	(0)

Managerial career
- 1978: Brynäs IF (playing manager)
- Gefle/Brynäs (ass. coach)
- * Club domestic league appearances and goals

Anders Ahlström (1 August 1948 – 13 June 2019) was a Swedish footballer and football manager. He made one appearance for Sweden and 27 Allsvenskan appearances for Djurgårdens IF.

== Honours ==
=== Individual ===
- Division 2 Norra Top Scorer (1): 1970.
