= Anton Ahlström =

Finnish forest ranger and politician (1869–1932)

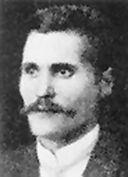

Anton (Antti) Ahlström (27 April 1890 – 5 November 1932) was a Finnish forest ranger and politician, born in Korpilahti. He was a member of the Parliament of Finland from 1908 to 1909, representing the Social Democratic Party of Finland (SDP).
