= Ahlstrom (disambiguation) =

Ahlstrom, now Ahlstrom-Munksjö, is an international company that produces fiber-based materials.

Ahlstrom may also refer to:

== People ==
- Elbert Halvor Ahlstrom (1910 – 1979), American professor, ichthyologist, zoologist, botanist, and phycologist
- Jennie Cecilia Ahlstrom (1861 – 1938), American actress active during the silent film era
- Lavern Ahlstrom, politician and former leader of the Alberta Social Credit Party
- Robby Ahlstrom (born 1999), American baseball player
- Sydney E. Ahlstrom (1919–1984), American educator and historian

== Other uses ==
- Alhambra/Ahlstrom Aerodrome, in Alhambra, Alberta, Canada

== See also ==
- Ahlström (disambiguation)
- Åhlström
