= Anders Gozzi =

Swedish ice hockey player and general manager

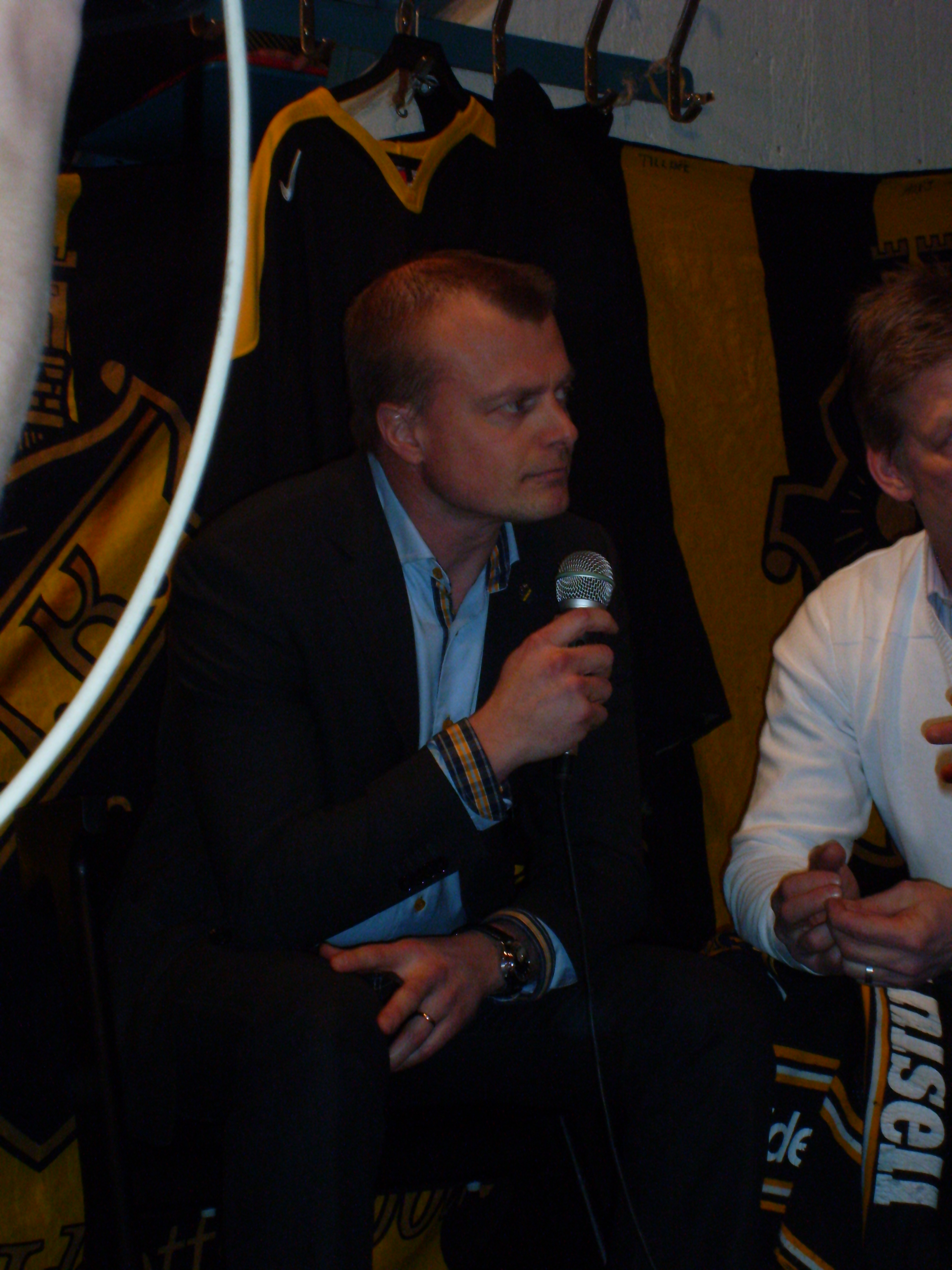
- Born: 12 June 1967 (age 59) Stockholm, Sweden
- Height: 5 ft 9 in (175 cm)
- Weight: 181 lb (82 kg; 12 st 13 lb)
- Position: Left wing
- Shot: Left
- Played for: AIK; Brynäs IF; Düsseldorfer EG
- Playing career: 1986–2004

Anders Gozzi (born 12 July 1967) is a Swedish former professional ice hockey player and currently the general manager of the AIK IF organization. In his career as a professional ice hockey player he played for AIK, Brynäs IF, and Düsseldorfer EG. In his first season with AIK, in the 1986–87 season, the team became promoted to Elitserien. He played in AIK during the majority of his career, and scored 315 points in 579 Elitserien (SEL) games. He became Elitserien champions with Brynäs IF in the 1992–93 season. He ended his ice hockey player career with AIK in the 2003–04 season, when the team played in HockeyAllsvenskan. He also was the general manager of AIK that season, and in the 2004–05 season he also became an assistant coach, replacing Tomas Winje mid-season. In the 2007–08 season he was the head coach of AIK from early December 2007 until the end of the season. Since the end of the 2007–08 season, he has been the general manager of AIK.

Gozzi's two sons, Patric Gozzi and Christoffer Gozzi, both play in the AIK IF organization.
