= Linus Videll =

Swedish ice hockey player

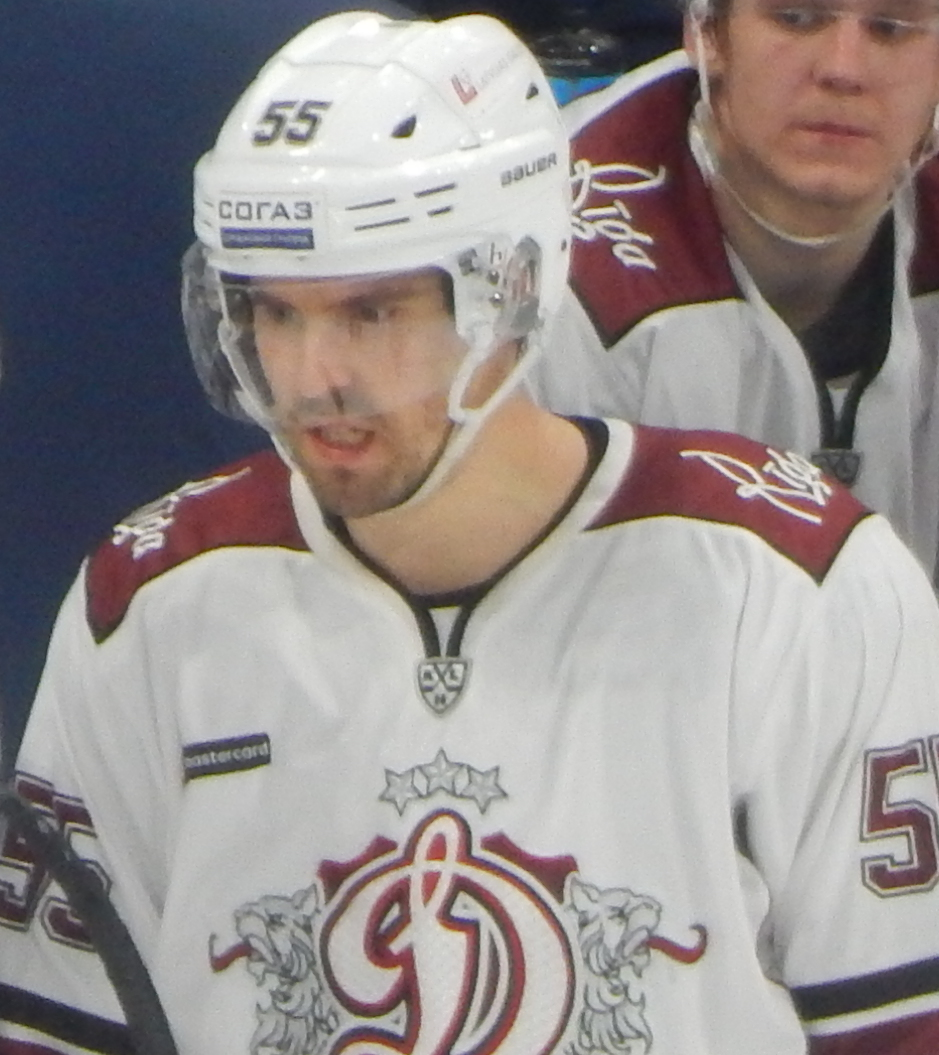
- Born: 5 May 1985 (age 41) Stockholm, Sweden
- Height: 6 ft 3 in (191 cm)
- Weight: 212 lb (96 kg; 15 st 2 lb)
- Position: Left/Right Wing
- Shoots: Left
- Allsv team Former teams: Östersunds IK; Södertälje SK; AIK; Yugra Khanty-Mansiysk; Severstal Cherepovets; Dinamo Riga; Torpedo Nizhny Novgorod; HC Kunlun Red Star; Traktor Chelyabinsk; Barys Nur-Sultan; Djurgårdens IF; Metallurg Magnitogorsk
- NHL draft: 204th overall, 2003; Colorado Avalanche
- Playing career: 2003–present

Björn Linus Videll (born 5 May 1985) is a Swedish professional ice hockey forward, currently playing with Östersunds IK of the HockeyAllsvenskan (Allsv).

== Playing career ==
Videll was drafted by the Colorado Avalanche in the seventh round of the 2003 NHL entry draft, 204th overall, after playing in the Swedish J20 SuperElit with AIK, Brynäs IF and Södertälje SK. Although his youth team is Djurgårdens IF Hockey, he left the Djurgården organization as a 13-year-old and instead joined the AIK organization.

From 2003 to 2011, Videll played primarily with Södertälje SK in the Elitserien (SEL). In the 2010–11 season, Videll scored a career high 20 goals and 43 points, despite Södertälje being relegated to HockeyAllsvenskan after failing to re-qualify in the 2011 Kvalserien. To remain in the Elitserien for the following season, Videll signed a one-year contract to return to AIK for the 2011–12 season. He played 14 games with AIK, scoring 5 goals and 12 points and at that time placing sixth in the scoring league.

But after that, he was sold to Yugra Khanty-Mansiysk of the Kontinental Hockey League (KHL) on 24 October 2011 for financial reasons. The main reason for this was that the Swedish Police Authority decided, just one week earlier, that the police should earn money for their efforts during sports events held by joint-stock companies (JSC). This mainly affected the Stockholm clubs Djurgårdens IF as well as AIK. AIK received 3,5 million SEK for selling Videll to Khanty-Mansiysk. The selling of Videll to Khanty-Mansiysk was considered a major loss for AIK, although Videll had at that time been on Khanty-Mansiysk's radar for two years.

After an injury-plagued first season with Yugra, his second season did not fare better after producing 10 points in 31 games in 2012–13, Videll was released from his contract on 29 December 2012. On 4 January 2013, Videll opted to remain in the KHL and signed for the remainder of the campaign with Servestal Cherepovets.

In the following 2013–14 season, Videll produced his most productive KHL season with Severstal appearing in 52 games with 10 goals and 17 assists for 27 points. On 9 May 2014, Videll signed an improved contract as a free agent with HC Donbass. With the announcement of Donbass suspending operations for the 2014–15 season due to civil unrest, Videll later signed a one-year contract with Latvian KHL club, Dinamo Riga on 2 September 2014. Videll established himself amongst Riga's top scoring lines, producing 34 points in 58 games.

On 9 June 2015, Videll transferred as a free agent to fellow KHL club, Torpedo Nizhny Novgorod on a one-year contract. In the 2015–16 season with Torpedo, Videll was looked upon as a top offensive contributor, co-leading the team with 21 assists and collecting 30-point in 44 regular season games. He appeared in a post-season high of 10 games and adding 3 points.

Videll kept on his journeyman ways joining his fifth KHL club in as many seasons, signing as a free agent with inaugural Chinese entrant, HC Kunlun Red Star, on a one-year deal on 28 September 2016. In the 2016–17 season, Videll was placed amongst the scoring lines with Kunlun and contributed with 28 points in 48 games.

As a free agent, Videll left China at the conclusion of his contract and continued in the KHL by signing another one-year deal with Traktor Chelyabinsk on 2 May 2017. In the 2017–18 season, Videll matched his previous season totals with 28 points in 46 games. He helped Traktor advance in the post-season, contributing with 6 points in 16 games.

On 12 May 2018, Videll returned on a one-year contract to former club, Dinamo Riga.

Following his 12th season in the KHL in 2021–22, Videll returned to his original Swedish club, Södertälje SK of the Allsvenskan, signing a two-year contract on 18 May 2022.

== Career statistics ==
=== Regular season and playoffs ===
			Regular season					Playoffs
Season	Team	League	GP	G	A	Pts	PIM	GP	G	A	Pts	PIM
2001–02	AIK	J18 Allsv	14	12	5	17	2	4	7	1	8	0
2001–02	AIK	J20	—	—	—	—	—	1	0	0	0	0
2002–03	Brynäs IF	J20	19	4	7	11	4	—	—	—	—	—
2002–03	Södertälje SK	J20	9	4	2	6	0	—	—	—	—	—
2003–04	Södertälje SK	J20	27	20	15	35	6	2	0	0	0	0
2003–04	Södertälje SK	SEL	23	0	2	2	0	—	—	—	—	—
2004–05	Södertälje SK	J20	13	6	4	10	0	3	0	2	2	0
2004–05	Södertälje SK	SEL	5	0	0	0	0	—	—	—	—	—
2004–05	Halmstad Hammers HC	Allsv	27	6	9	15	6	—	—	—	—	—
2005–06	Södertälje SK	J20	2	3	1	4	0	—	—	—	—	—
2005–06	Södertälje SK	SEL	31	1	3	4	4	—	—	—	—	—
2005–06	AIK	Allsv	20	6	7	13	4	—	—	—	—	—
2006–07	Södertälje SK	Allsv	45	16	23	39	20	10	7	8	15	6
2007–08	Södertälje SK	SEL	53	13	13	26	6	—	—	—	—	—
2008–09	Södertälje SK	SEL	54	9	11	20	8	—	—	—	—	—
2009–10	Södertälje SK	SEL	49	17	16	33	18	—	—	—	—	—
2010–11	Södertälje SK	SEL	52	20	23	43	10	—	—	—	—	—
2011–12	AIK	SEL	14	5	7	12	2	—	—	—	—	—
2011–12	HC Yugra	KHL	11	2	4	6	2	5	1	6	7	2
2012–13	HC Yugra	KHL	31	5	5	10	0	—	—	—	—	—
2012–13	Severstal Cherepovets	KHL	11	3	5	8	6	7	0	2	2	2
2013–14	Severstal Cherepovets	KHL	52	10	17	27	10	—	—	—	—	—
2014–15	Dinamo Rīga	KHL	58	10	24	34	30	—	—	—	—	—
2015–16	Torpedo Nizhny Novgorod	KHL	44	9	21	30	8	10	1	2	3	2
2016–17	Kunlun Red Star	KHL	46	9	19	28	16	5	1	3	4	4
2017–18	Traktor Chelyabinsk	KHL	46	8	20	28	10	16	3	3	6	2
2018–19	Dinamo Rīga	KHL	49	24	24	48	14	—	—	—	—	—
2019–20	Barys Nur–Sultan	KHL	37	10	20	30	4	5	1	3	4	0
2020–21	Barys Nur–Sultan	KHL	59	9	27	36	18	6	1	4	5	0
2021–22	Djurgårdens IF	SHL	11	3	5	8	0	—	—	—	—	—
2021–22	Metallurg Magnitogorsk	KHL	—	—	—	—	—	15	4	0	4	0
2022–23	Södertälje SK	Allsv	42	27	30	57	8	—	—	—	—	—
2023–24	Södertälje SK	Allsv	30	9	26	35	4	3	0	2	2	2
2024–25	Östersunds IK	Allsv	51	13	14	27	16	—	—	—	—	—
SHL totals			292	68	80	148	48	—	—	—	—	—
KHL totals			444	99	186	285	118	69	12	23	35	12

=== International ===
Year	Team	Event	Result	GP	G	A	Pts	PIM
2002	Sweden	U18	7th	5	1	0	1	0
2003	Sweden	WJC18	5th	6	2	0	2	12
2005	Sweden	WJC	6th	6	0	4	4	0
Junior totals				17	3	4	7	12
