= Axel Åhlström =

Finnish schoolteacher, journalist and politician (1891–1934)

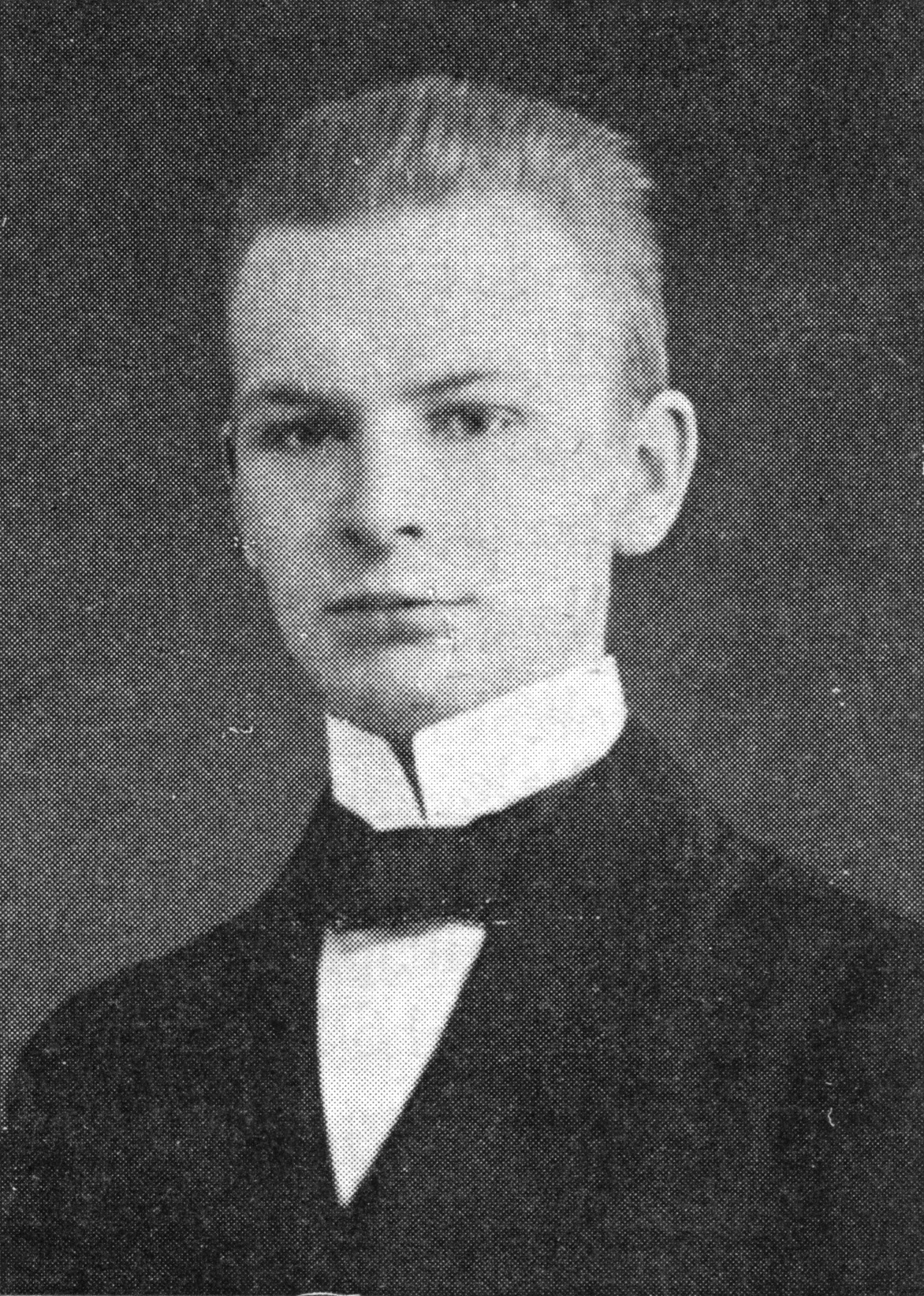
Axel Åhlström in 1914

Axel Leonard Åhlström (12 February 1891 – 26 October 1934; assumed name from 1918 to 1922 Leonard Johanson) was a Finland-Swedish schoolteacher, journalist and politician, born in Helsinki.

He studied to become a school teacher at the teacher training college in Nykarleby, where he was admitted in 1911 and graduated from in 1915, and then worked as a substitute teacher in Kimito from 1915 to 1916 and in Helsinki from 1916 to 1917.

He was a member of the Parliament of Finland from 1929 until his death in 1934, representing the Social Democratic Party of Finland (SDP). He was a presidential elector in the 1931 Finnish presidential election. In 1918, Åhlström was imprisoned for having sided with the Reds during the Finnish Civil War. He was able to flee from the prison camp where he was being held and lived until 1922 under the assumed identity of Leonard Johanson. He eventually assumed his real identity.

From 1921 he worked as editor and from 1925 as editor-in-chief at Arbetarbladet, a magazine published by the Social Democratic Party of Finland. Åhlström was chairman of Finlands svenska arbetarförbund from 1922 and sat on the Helsinki City Council from 1928 to 1930. During his time as politician he fought especially for culture, language and human rights issues, including the rights of Finland-Swedes and conscientious objectors, and was involved in Nordic social democratic cooperation.

Åhlströms parents were Leonard Johan Åhlström and Elisabeth Forss, both from Vörå in Ostrobothnia. He was married to Vera Uggeldahl and died in 1934 because of kidney disease.
