= David Lillieström Karlsson =

Swedish ice hockey player

- Born: April 12, 1993 (age 33) Stockholm, Sweden
- Height: 5 ft 11 in (180 cm)
- Weight: 187 lb (85 kg; 13 st 5 lb)
- Position: Forward
- Shot: Right
- NHL draft: Undrafted
- Playing career: 2011–2017

David Lillieström Karlsson (born April 12, 1993) is a Swedish former professional ice hockey player, who last played with Guildford Flames of the UK's Elite Ice Hockey League (EIHL).

In the 2009-10 he started to play with the AIK J18 team in the J18 Elit. After a spell with Östersunds IK of the Swedish Elitserien, Lillieström Karlsson moved to the UK to sign for Guildford Flames in June 2017.

After suffering a concussion while playing for Guildford, Lillieström Karlsson was forced to retire at the age of 24. The announcement was made on 24 October 2017.
