= Filip Olsson (ice hockey) =

Swedish ice hockey player

- Born: January 28, 1991 (age 35) Stockholm, Stockholm County
- Height: 5 ft 11 in (180 cm)
- Weight: 176 lb (80 kg; 12 st 8 lb)
- Position: Defenceman
- Shot: Left
- Played for: AIK; IF Troja-Ljungby; Mörrums IK; Huddinge IK
- National team: Sweden
- Playing career: 2008–2016

Filip Olsson (born January 28, 1991) is a Swedish ice hockey defenceman currently playing in Mörrums IK of the Division 1. Olsson has also played in Sweden's national junior team, both U18 and U19, and in AIK's elite team in Elitserien. His youth team is Flemingsbergs IK.

== Career statistics ==
			Regular season					Playoffs
Season	Team	League	GP	G	A	Pts	PIM	GP	G	A	Pts	PIM
2006–07	Hammarby IF J18	J18 Allsvenskan	3	0	0	0	0	—	—	—	—	—
2007–08	AIK IF J18	J18 Elit	19	9	5	14	18	—	—	—	—	—
2007–08	AIK IF J18	J18 Allsvenskan	10	2	3	5	2	—	—	—	—	—
2007–08	AIK IF J20	J20 SuperElit	11	0	2	2	16	—	—	—	—	—
2008–09	AIK IF J18	J18 Allsvenskan	4	1	3	4	2	7	1	7	8	2
2008–09	AIK IF J20	J20 SuperElit	31	6	14	20	28	—	—	—	—	—
2008–09	AIK IF	HockeyAllsvenskan	6	0	2	2	2	—	—	—	—	—
2009–10	AIK IF J20	J20 SuperElit	24	4	9	13	24	5	1	3	4	0
2009–10	AIK IF	HockeyAllsvenskan	33	0	5	5	2	—	—	—	—	—
2010–11	AIK IF J20	J20 SuperElit	22	5	10	15	6	—	—	—	—	—
2010–11	AIK IF	Elitserien	9	1	0	1	2	—	—	—	—	—
2010–11	IF Troja-Ljungby	HockeyAllsvenskan	19	1	3	4	8	—	—	—	—	—
2011–12	Mörrums GoIS IK	Division 1	41	4	7	11	8	—	—	—	—	—
2012–13	Huddinge IK	Hockeyettan	28	9	18	27	10	15	2	8	10	6
2013–14	Huddinge IK	Hockeyettan	37	8	14	22	14	5	2	2	4	6
2014–15	Huddinge IK	Hockeyettan	36	12	29	41	12	8	3	4	7	4
2015–16	AIK IF	HockeyAllsvenskan	19	0	3	3	6	—	—	—	—	—
2015–16	Huddinge IK	Hockeyettan	14	5	5	10	29	2	0	1	1	0
Elitserien totals			9	1	0	1	2	—	—	—	—	—
HockeyAllsvenskan totals			77	1	13	14	18	—	—	—	—	—
Hockeyettan (Division 1) totals			156	38	73	111	73	30	7	15	22	16
