= Visby/Roma HK =

- City: Visby, Gotland, Sweden
- League: HockeyAllsvenskan
- Division: East
- Founded: 2001
- Home arena: Visby ishall (capacity 2000)
- Colors: Black, gold, silver
- General manager: (Sweden) André Lundholm
- Head coach: (Sweden) Hans Särkijärvi
- Website: www.visbyroma.se

Visby/Roma HK is a Swedish ice hockey club located in Visby on Gotland. The club currently plays in HockeyAllsvenskan, the second tier of Swedish ice hockey, as of the 2026–27 season. The club plays its home games in Visby ishall, which has a capacity of 2000 spectators.
