= Oscar Ahlström =

Swedish ice hockey player

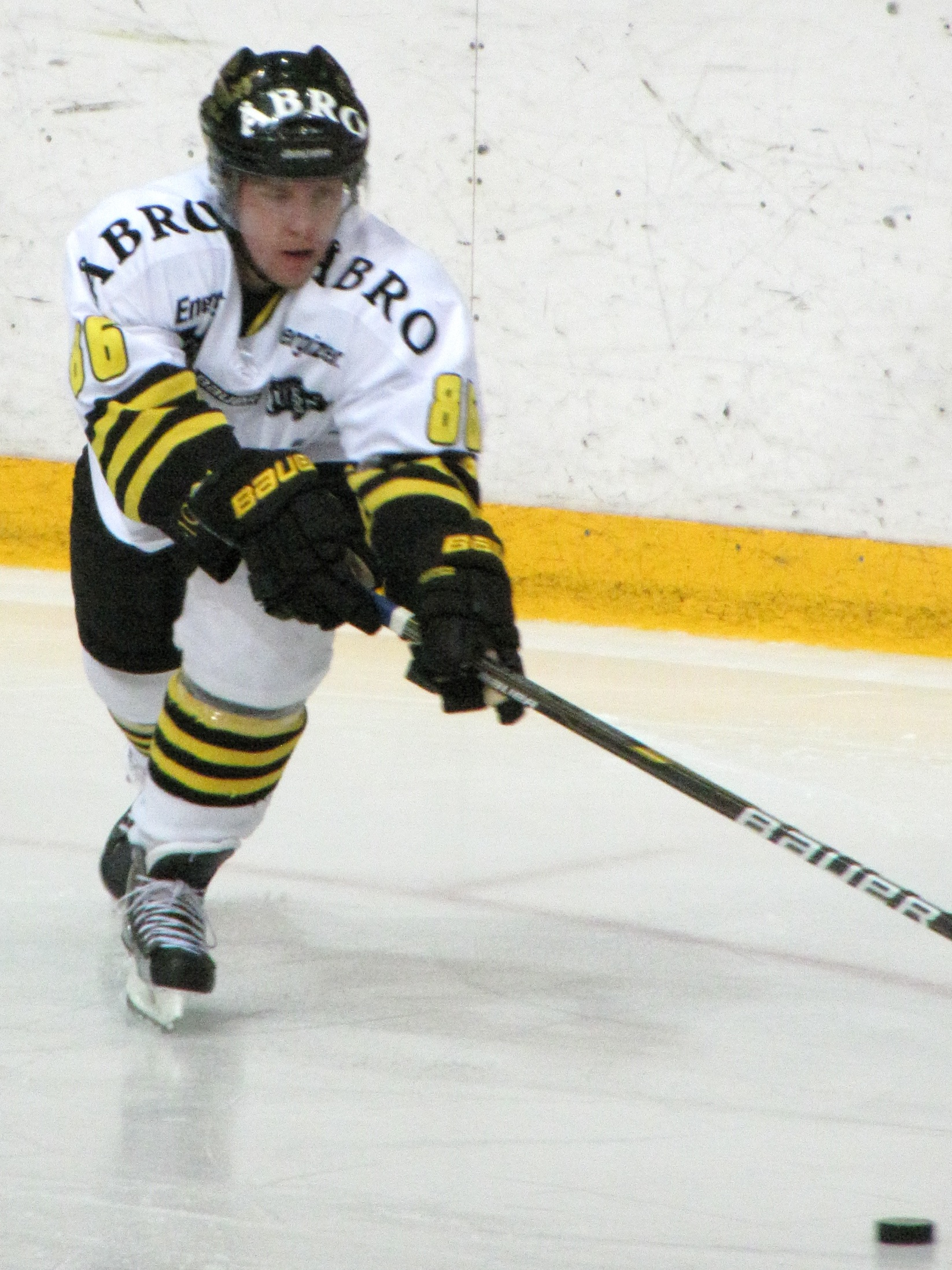
- Born: 15 November 1986 (age 39) Farsta, Sweden
- Height: 5 ft 10 in (178 cm)
- Weight: 183 lb (83 kg; 13 st 1 lb)
- Position: Right wing
- Shoots: Left
- ITA2 team Former teams: HC Merano; Huddinge IK; AIK IF; Södertälje SK; IF Sundsvall Hockey; Frisk Asker; Ritten Sport; Scorpions de Mulhouse
- Playing career: 2004–present

Oscar Ahlström (born 15 November 1986) is a Swedish professional ice hockey player (right wing), who is currently playing for HC Merano of the Italian second tier Italian Hockey League.

Ahlström has previously played in his youth team, Huddinge IK, of the HockeyAllsvenskan before making his Swedish Hockey League debut with AIK IF. He has a twin brother, Victor, who also plays in Merano.

== Career statistics ==
			Regular season					Playoffs
Season	Team	League	GP	G	A	Pts	PIM	GP	G	A	Pts	PIM
2002–03	Huddinge IK	J18	14	6	5	11	2	2	0	0	0	0
2003–04	Huddinge IK	J18	2	0	1	1	4	—	—	—	—	—
2003–04	Huddinge IK	J20	33	7	3	10	2	2	0	0	0	2
2004–05	Huddinge IK	J20	30	14	18	32	20	3	0	0	0	2
2004–05	Huddinge IK	Allsv	16	1	0	1	0	—	—	—	—	—
2005–06	Huddinge IK	J20	9	4	3	7	2	—	—	—	—	—
2005–06	Huddinge IK	Div.1	36	11	22	33	12	8	4	4	8	2
2006–07	Huddinge IK	Allsv	45	4	3	7	12	8	0	1	1	4
2007–08	Huddinge IK	Allsv	45	13	21	34	10	8	3	5	8	6
2008–09	Huddinge IK	Allsv	45	19	26	45	26	10	6	6	12	12
2009–10	AIK	Allsv	52	6	15	21	8	10	1	3	4	0
2010–11	AIK	SEL	53	9	12	21	8	8	3	0	3	0
2011–12	AIK	SEL	53	13	7	20	8	12	4	0	4	4
2012–13	AIK	SEL	55	6	7	13	8	—	—	—	—	—
2013–14	AIK	SHL	55	6	11	17	20	10	1	0	1	0
2014–15	Södertälje SK	Allsv	32	2	4	6	10	10	1	3	4	0
2015–16	IF Sundsvall	Allsv	9	4	0	4	4	—	—	—	—	—
2015–16	Frisk Asker	GET	14	6	5	11	0	6	1	1	2	0
2016–17	Ritten Sport	AlpsHL	39	20	21	41	18	12	5	5	10	6
2016–17	Ritten Sport	ITA	2	1	0	1	0	—	—	—	—	—
2017–18	Ritten Sport	AlpsHL	39	19	20	39	12	16	7	3	10	6
2017–18	Ritten Sport	ITA	2	2	0	2	0	—	—	—	—	—
2018–19	Scorpions de Mulhouse	FRA	4	3	0	3	12	—	—	—	—	—
2019–20	AIK	Allsv	16	1	2	3	2	—	—	—	—	—
2020–21	HC Merano	ITA2	5	3	6	9	0	—	—	—	—	—
SHL totals			216	34	37	71	44	30	8	0	8	4
