= Eric Norin =

Swedish ice hockey player (born 1991)

- Born: October 22, 1991 (age 34) Täby, Sweden
- Height: 6 ft 0 in (183 cm)
- Weight: 172 lb (78 kg; 12 st 4 lb)
- Position: Defence
- Shoots: Right
- Allsv team Former teams: AIK; Brynäs IF; Tappara
- Playing career: 2011–present

Eric Norin (born October 22, 1991) is a Swedish professional ice hockey player, currently playing with AIK in the HockeyAllsvenskan (Allsv). He played with AIK IF in the Elitserien during the 2010–11 Elitserien season and has also appeared in the top flight for Brynäs IF.

== Playing career ==
Norin began playing ice hockey in IFK Täby, in northern Stockholm. He then moved to Stocksund IF's under-18 team, he played one season for Stocksund J18 during the 2007–08 season. The season 2008–09 he moved to AIK J18. This season the team became J18 Allsvenskan Champions by defeating Skellefteå AIK in the finals. The team became AIK's first J18 team ever to win the Championship in AIK history. Norin also had a successful season 2010–11 in AIK J20 SuperElit, scoring 10 goals and 27 points in 39 games, as well as 2 points in 5 games in the Elitserien.
