= Jonas Liwing =

Swedish ice hockey player

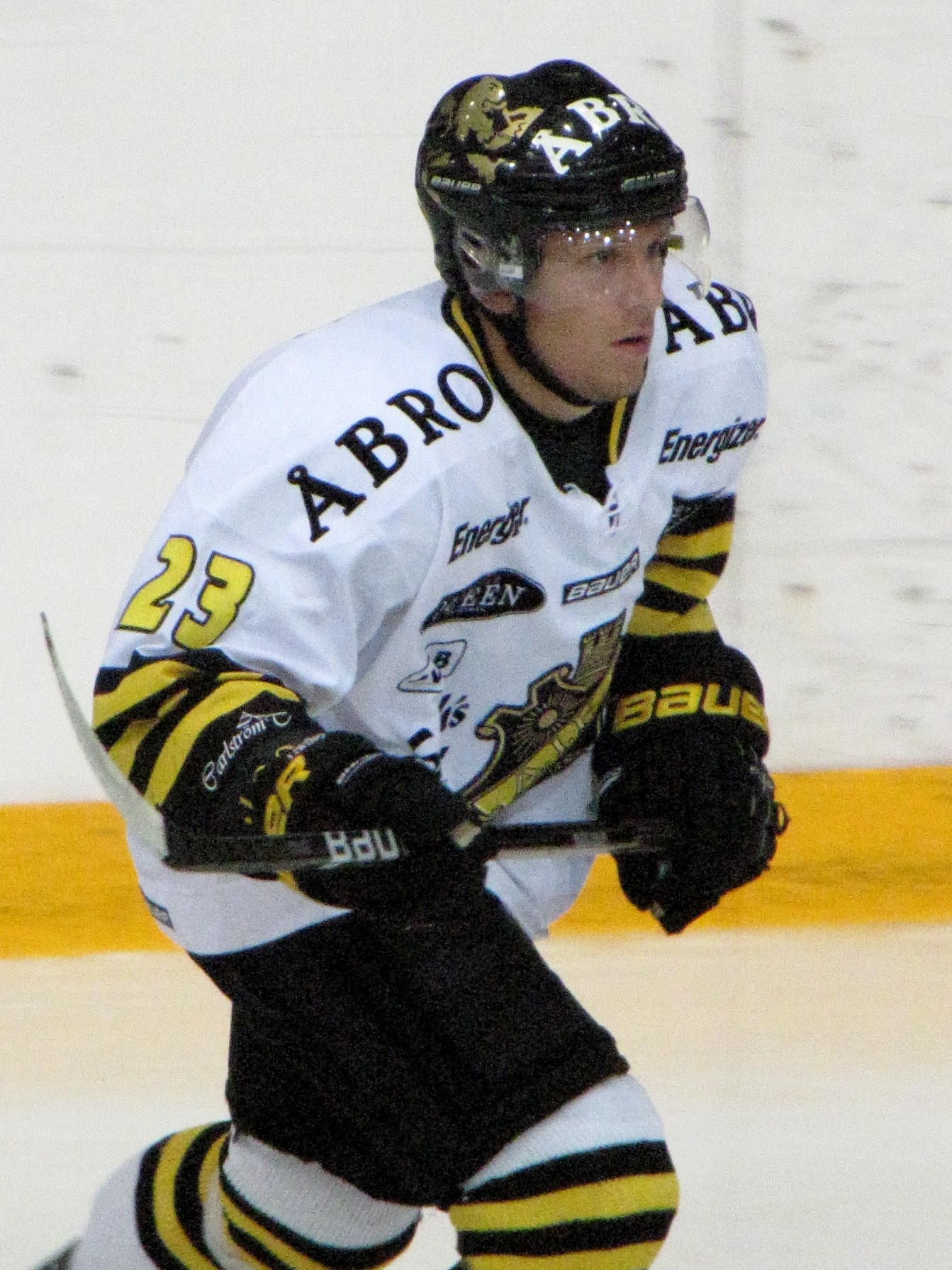
- Born: January 29, 1983 (age 43) Stockholm, Sweden
- Height: 5 ft 10 in (178 cm)
- Weight: 194 lb (88 kg; 13 st 12 lb)
- Position: Defenceman
- Shot: Right
- EIHL team Former teams: Sheffield Steelers; Djurgårdens IF; HC TWK Innsbruck; Dragons de Rouen; AIK IF; Iserlohn Roosters; Hamburg Freezers
- Playing career: 2005–2023

Jonas Liwing (born January 29, 1983 in Stockholm) is a Swedish professional ice hockey defenceman currently playing for the Sheffield Steelers in the Elite Ice Hockey League (EIHL). He has previously played with Djurgårdens IF and AIK of the Swedish Hockey League. He originally played with youth team IK Göta.

Liwing signed a one-year contract as a free agent with the Hamburg Freezers on May 18, 2015, after playing his first season in the German DEL with the Iserlohn Roosters in 2014–15.

== Career statistics ==
			Regular season					Playoffs
Season	Team	League	GP	G	A	Pts	PIM	GP	G	A	Pts	PIM
1999–00	AIK IF J18	J18 Allsvenskan	14	4	2	6	8	5	0	1	1	4
2000–01	AIK IF J18	J18 Allsvenskan	2	1	0	1	0	—	—	—	—	—
2000–01	AIK IF J20	J20 SuperElit	20	7	4	11	46	5	2	1	3	12
2001–02	AIK IF J20	J20 SuperElit	35	13	24	37	20	4	2	3	5	4
2002–03	AIK IF J20	J20 SuperElit	4	2	2	4	0	4	1	0	1	2
2002–03	AIK IF	Allsvenskan	39	8	6	14	26	7	0	0	0	0
2003–04	AIK IF	Allsvenskan	46	8	17	25	22	10	1	1	2	4
2004–05	IK Oskarshamn	Allsvenskan	44	10	14	24	24	8	1	1	2	12
2005–06	Djurgårdens IF J20	J20 SuperElit	6	0	3	3	2	—	—	—	—	—
2005–06	Djurgårdens IF	Elitserien	44	2	3	5	14	—	—	—	—	—
2006–07	Djurgårdens IF	Elitserien	34	2	4	6	22	—	—	—	—	—
2006–07	HC Innsbruck	EBEL	17	1	5	6	12	—	—	—	—	—
2007–08	Dragons de Rouen	Ligue Magnus	26	4	29	33	6	9	2	7	9	18
2008–09	AIK IF	HockeyAllsvenskan	44	5	14	19	18	10	5	3	8	8
2009–10	AIK IF	HockeyAllsvenskan	52	8	12	20	36	10	1	2	3	6
2010–11	AIK IF	Elitserien	45	3	8	11	10	8	0	3	3	0
2011–12	AIK IF	Elitserien	53	3	8	11	16	12	1	3	4	4
2012–13	AIK IF	Elitserien	54	8	15	23	14	—	—	—	—	—
2013–14	AIK IF	SHL	53	5	20	25	12	—	—	—	—	—
2014–15	Iserlohn Roosters	DEL	52	4	21	25	12	7	1	3	4	0
2015–16	Hamburg Freezers	DEL	41	2	9	11	8	—	—	—	—	—
2016–17	IK Oskarshamn	HockeyAllsvenskan	52	3	19	22	14	—	—	—	—	—
2017–18	Södertälje SK	HockeyAllsvenskan	48	4	19	23	12	—	—	—	—	—
2018–19	Västerås IK	HockeyAllsvenskan	51	6	22	28	16	5	0	2	2	0
2019–20	Sheffield Steelers	EIHL	17	1	2	3	2	—	—	—	—	—
2021–22	Brödernas Hockey	Division 4	22	13	48	61	2	4	4	6	10	0
2022–23	Brödernas Hockey	Division 3	20	5	44	49	10	8	1	13	14	0
SHL (Elitserien) totals			283	23	58	81	88	30	1	9	10	6
DEL totals			93	6	30	36	20	7	1	3	4	0
Allsvenskan totals			129	26	37	63	72	25	2	2	4	16
HockeyAllsvenskan totals			247	26	86	112	96	25	6	7	13	14
