= Fredrik Svensson (ice hockey) =

Swedish ice hockey player

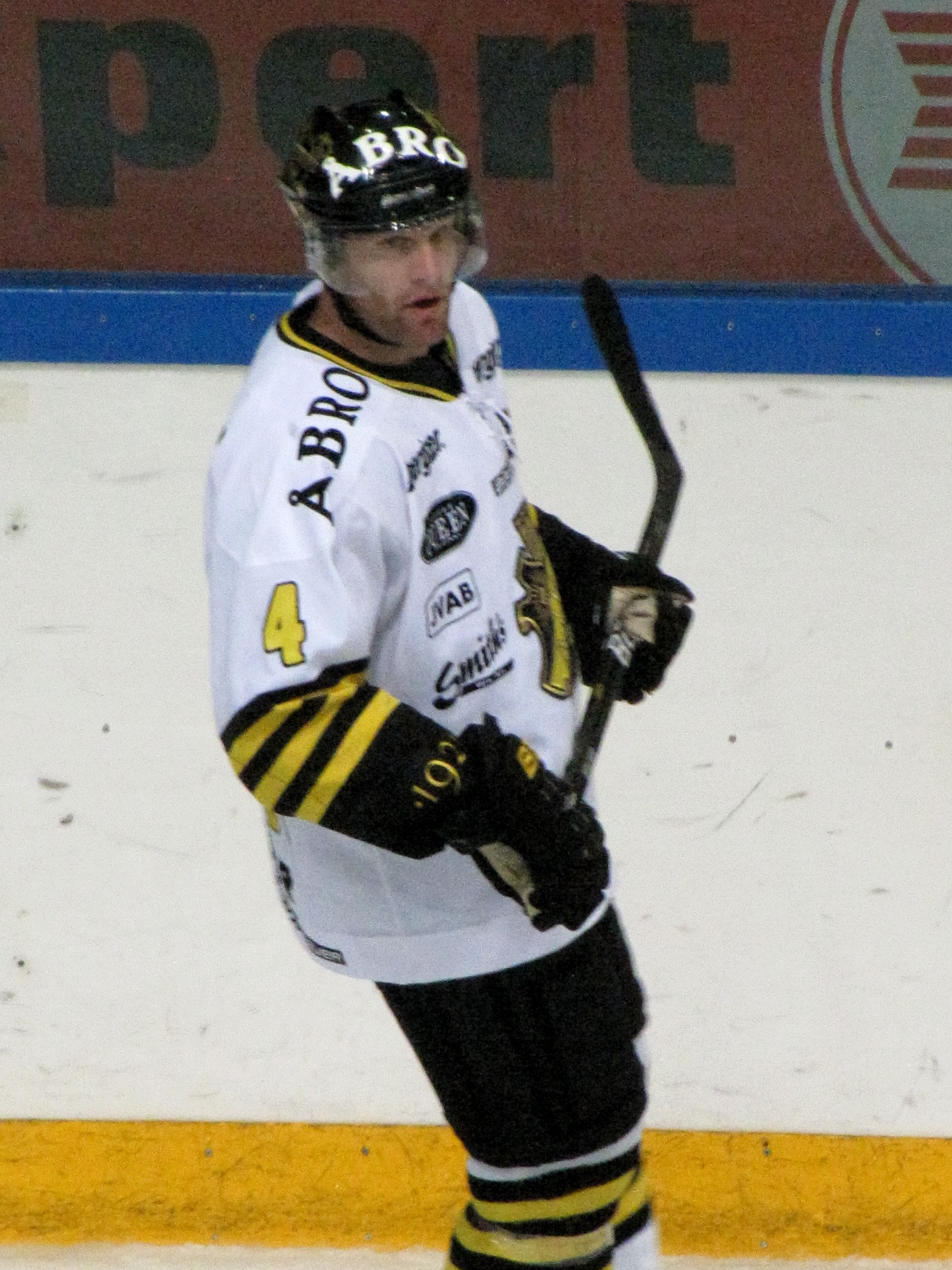
- Born: April 13, 1975 (age 51) Stockholm, Sweden
- Height: 6 ft 0 in (183 cm)
- Weight: 207 lb (94 kg; 14 st 11 lb)
- Position: Defenceman
- Shot: Left
- Played for: SM-liiga; Espoo Blues; HPK; Ilves; Elitserien; Malmö Redhawks; Luleå HF; Södertälje SK; AIK; National League A HC Ambrì-Piotta; Deutsche Eishockey Liga; Grizzly Adams Wolfsburg
- National team: Sweden
- Playing career: 1997–2016

Fredrik Svensson (born April 13, 1975) is a Swedish professional ice hockey defenceman, currently playing with AIK of the Elitserien (SEL). His youth team is Skå IK.

== Career statistics ==
			Regular season					Playoffs
Season	Team	League	GP	G	A	Pts	PIM	GP	G	A	Pts	PIM
1993–94	Hammarby IF J20	Juniorallsvenskan	14	0	4	4	28	—	—	—	—	—
1993–94	Hammarby IF	Division 1	9	0	1	1	0	—	—	—	—	—
1994–95	Hammarby IF J20	J20 SuperElit	8	2	0	2	0	—	—	—	—	—
1994–95	Hammarby IF	Division 1	30	2	1	3	32	—	—	—	—	—
1995–96	Hammarby IF J20	J20 SuperElit	6	0	3	3	8	—	—	—	—	—
1995–96	Hammarby IF	Division 1	29	5	15	20	20	3	0	0	0	2
1996–97	Hammarby IF	Division 1	32	5	9	14	16	—	—	—	—	—
1997–98	Hammarby IF	Division 1	19	4	8	12	16	—	—	—	—	—
1997–98	MIF Redhawks J20	J20 SuperElit	4	1	2	3	0	—	—	—	—	—
1997–98	Kiekko-Espoo	SM-liiga	1	0	0	0	0	—	—	—	—	—
1998–99	Skellefteå AIK	Division 1	24	4	1	5	30	5	0	1	1	6
1999–00	Luleå HF	Elitserien	44	7	6	13	68	9	3	0	3	18
2000–01	Luleå HF	Elitserien	46	3	9	12	51	9	1	0	1	31
2001–02	Luleå HF	Elitserien	49	5	5	10	53	4	0	1	1	4
2001–02	Luleå HF J20	J20 SuperElit	1	0	1	1	2	—	—	—	—	—
2002–03	Luleå HF	Elitserien	48	6	4	10	57	4	0	1	1	4
2003–04	Leksands IF	Elitserien	48	3	11	14	111	—	—	—	—	—
2004–05	Leksands IF	Allsvenskan	35	2	15	17	36	4	0	0	0	0
2005–06	HC Ambrì-Piotta	NLA	16	2	2	4	20	5	0	3	3	4
2006–07	HC Ambrì-Piotta	NLA	23	1	4	5	34	—	—	—	—	—
2006–07	HPK	SM-liiga	22	0	4	4	18	—	—	—	—	—
2007–08	Grizzly Adams Wolfsburg	DEL	47	2	13	15	59	—	—	—	—	—
2008–09	Grizzly Adams Wolfsburg	DEL	21	1	5	6	14	5	0	0	0	2
2009–10	Södertälje SK	Elitserien	37	2	5	7	32	—	—	—	—	—
2009–10	Södertälje SK J20	J20 SuperElit	2	0	1	1	2	—	—	—	—	—
2010–11	Ilves	SM-liiga	8	0	0	0	6	—	—	—	—	—
2010–11	AIK IF	Elitserien	18	0	1	1	8	8	0	0	0	14
2011–12	AIK IF	Elitserien	39	0	7	7	45	—	—	—	—	—
2012–13	Luleå HF	Elitserien	37	2	6	8	18	13	0	0	0	16
2013–14	AIK IF	SHL	38	1	2	3	48	—	—	—	—	—
2014–15	Vallentuna BK	Hockeyettan	34	1	15	16	71	10	0	3	3	20
2015–16	Vallentuna BK	Hockeyettan	2	0	0	0	2	—	—	—	—	—
SHL/Elitserien totals			404	29	56	85	491	47	4	2	6	87
NLA totals			39	3	6	9	54	5	0	3	3	4
SM-liiga totals			31	0	4	4	24	—	—	—	—	—
DEL totals			68	3	18	21	73	5	0	0	0	2
Division 1 totals			143	20	35	55	114	8	0	1	1	8
