= Victor Ahlström =

Swedish professional ice hockey player (born 1986)

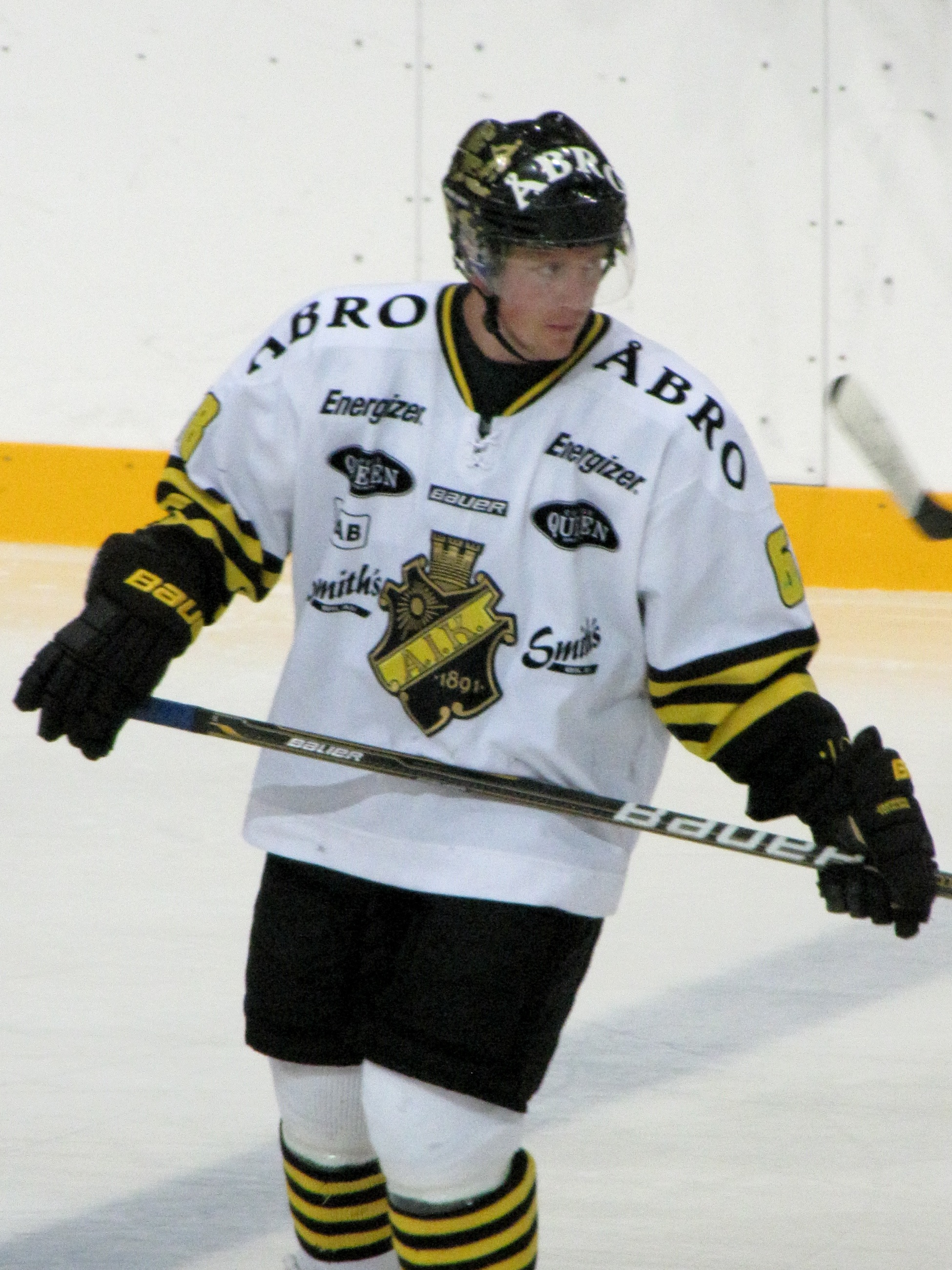
- Born: 15 November 1986 (age 39) Farsta, Stockholm
- Height: 5 ft 10 in (178 cm)
- Weight: 183 lb (83 kg; 13 st 1 lb)
- Position: Left wing
- Shoots: Left
- GET team Former teams: Frisk Asker; AIK IF
- Playing career: 2004–present

Victor Ahlström, born 15 November 1986 in Farsta, Stockholm, is a Swedish professional ice hockey player (left wing), who is currently playing for Frisk Asker of the Norwegian GET-ligaen.

Ahlström has played five seasons with Huddinge IK in HockeyAllsvenskan, before making his debut in the Swedish Hockey League with AIK IF. He has a twin brother, Oscar, who also plays in Frisk Asker.

== Career statistics ==
			Regular season					Playoffs
Season	Team	League	GP	G	A	Pts	PIM	GP	G	A	Pts	PIM
2002–03	Huddinge IK	J18	13	5	8	13	0	2	0	0	0	0
2003–04	Huddinge IK	J20	35	13	10	23	4	2	0	0	0	0
2004–05	Huddinge IK	J20	30	13	26	39	8	3	0	1	1	2
2004–05	Huddinge IK	Allsv	16	2	1	3	0	—	—	—	—	—
2005–06	Huddinge IK	J20	7	7	4	11	4	—	—	—	—	—
2005–06	Huddinge IK	Div.1	31	18	18	36	10	8	2	8	8	6
2006–07	Huddinge IK	Allsv	45	6	6	12	8	8	1	2	3	4
2007–08	Huddinge IK	Allsv	45	15	20	35	16	8	4	7	11	0
2008–09	Huddinge IK	Allsv	45	20	23	43	20	9	4	4	8	0
2009–10	AIK	Allsv	51	14	14	28	16	10	1	1	2	4
2010–11	AIK	SEL	53	8	13	21	8	8	0	1	1	2
2011–12	AIK	SEL	53	4	12	16	4	11	0	3	3	2
2012–13	AIK	SEL	55	5	6	11	12	—	—	—	—	—
2013–14	AIK	SHL	55	6	11	17	8	10	0	1	1	2
2014–15	Södertälje SK	Allsv	50	4	4	8	6	10	2	0	2	4
2015–16	IF Sundsvall	Allsv	9	2	2	4	4	—	—	—	—	—
2015–16	Frisk Asker	GET	14	5	8	13	2	6	2	2	4	2
SHL totals			214	23	42	65	32	29	0	5	5	6
