= Anna Ahlström =

Swedish teacher and principal

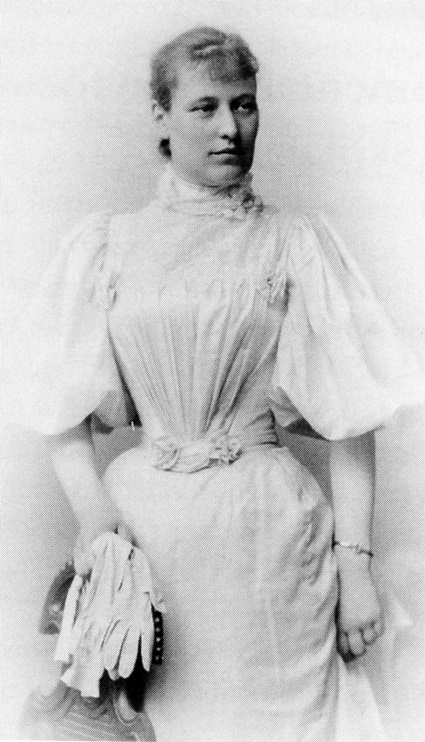
- Anna Ahlström, ca 1880
- Born: 19 July 1863
- Died: 12 October 1943 (aged 80)
- Occupation(s): teacher and principal

Anna Ahlström (19 July 1863 – 12 October 1943) was a Swedish teacher and principal who, in 1902, founded the New Elementary School for Girls - Ahlströmska school - in Stockholm. The school's director was her life partner. In 1903, she formed the Akademiskt Bildade Kvinnors Förening or ABKF ('Society of Women Academics') which influenced the government to address the issue of gender discrimination, which ultimately resulted in the Behörighetslagen, a law which formally declared almost all professions and positions in society open for both men and women.

== Biography ==
Anna Sofia Charlotta Ahlström was born in Stockholm on 19 July 1863. She was the daughter of Jonas Ahlström. She received her high school diploma in 1885 at the Wallinska school, in Stockholm. She continued her studies in Uppsala University and graduated from the bachelor's degree in 1891 after which, she traveled in Italy and France, living in Paris. She studied modern languages in Paris, London, and Berlin. In 1899, she defended her Ph.D. thesis in Uppsala. She was one of the first women to receive a doctorate in Sweden, and Sweden's first female doctor in Romance languages (1899). She wrote her thesis on Gustave Flaubert's language in French in France.

Before her doctoral degree, she taught in 1893 at several girls' schools in Stockholm. When she was not allowed to apply for an associate professorship, she decided to start her own girls' school. After completing her doctoral degree, she established the New Elementary School for Girls in Stockholm in 1902, and began teaching the girls autumn term 1903, first in her own floor on Jungfrugatan 17, and a few months later, in various school premises on Kommendörsgatan in Östermalm, among others at Kommendörsgatan 25 (teaching fifteen girls and a boy).

In 1907, Ahlström employed a younger teacher, Ellen Terserus (1867-1943), who became the school's director. Terserus graduated universities in England and the United States. Ahlström led this free school together with Ellen Terserus, her life partner. When Ahlström was almost 50 years old, she and Ellen Terserus moved into a common apartment on Sibyllegatan and ten years later, they moved to a large floor in the actual school house (Kommendörsgatan / Artillerigatan). Ahlström and Terserus both retired in 1930.

Ahlström died on 12 October 1943, three weeks after Terserus.

== Honors ==
- Anna Ahlström and Ellen Terserus Foundation
