= Almtuna IS =

Swedish ice hockey club

- City: Uppsala, Sweden
- League: HockeyAllsvenskan
- Founded: 1932 (Hockey in 1947)
- Home arena: Upplands Bilforum Arena
- Colors
- General manager: Nicklas Danielsson
- Head coach: Marcus Ragnarsson
- Website: almtuna.com

Almtuna Idrottssällskap, commonly known as Almtuna IS, is a Swedish professional ice hockey club based in Uppsala and is currently playing in HockeyAllsvenskan, the second highest league of ice hockey in Sweden. The team maintained its place in the Allsvenskan despite suffering relegation in the 2018–19 season following the exit of IK Pantern due to economic troubles prior to the 2019–20 season.

== History ==
Almtuna IS was founded in 1932 with teams in football, bandy and table tennis. In 1947 ice hockey was added to the clubs program.

In the 1980s Almtuna IS became a strictly ice hockey team, and in 2006 they added a women's team.

== Season-by-season results ==
updated December 3, 2013 Some seasons statistics are not available or have not yet been located.

Season	League	GP	W	T	L	OTW	OTL	Pts	GF	GA	Finish	Playoffs
1951-52	Division 2	10	1	0	9	—	—	2	34	62	6th	—
1954-55	Division 2	—	—	—	—	—	—	—	—	—	—	—
1955-56	Division 2	—	—	—	—	—	—	—	—	—	—	—
1956-57	Division 2	—	—	—	—	—	—	—	—	—	—	—
1957-58	Division 2	—	—	—	—	—	—	—	—	—	—	—
1958-59	Division 2	—	—	—	—	—	—	—	—	—	—	—
1959-60	Division 2	—	—	—	—	—	—	—	—	—	—	—
1960-61	Division 2	—	—	—	—	—	—	—	—	—	—	—
1961-62	Division 2	—	—	—	—	—	—	—	—	—	—	—
1962-63	Division 1	14	1	1	12	—	—	3	34	81	8th	Relegated
1963-64	Division 2	—	—	—	—	—	—	—	—	—	—	—
1964-65	Division 2	—	—	—	—	—	—	—	—	—	—	—
1965-66	Division 2	—	—	—	—	—	—	—	—	—	—	—
1966-67	Division 2	22	17	2	3	—	—	36	116	58	2nd	
1967-68	Division 2	—	—	—	—	—	—	—	—	—	3rd	—
1968-69	Division 2	—	—	—	—	—	—	—	—	—	3rd	—
1969-70	Division 2	—	—	—	—	—	—	—	—	—	1st	—
1970-71	Division 2	18	7	6	5	—	—	20	79	60	5th	—
1971-72	Division 2	18	10	7	1	—	—	27	113	57	1st	—
1972-73	Division 2	—	—	—	—	—	—	—	—	—	—	—
1973-74	Division 2	—	—	—	—	—	—	—	—	—	—	—
1974-75	Division 2	—	—	—	—	—	—	—	—	—	—	—
1975-76	Division 2	—	—	—	—	—	—	—	—	—	—	—
1976-77	Division 1	33	17	1	15	—	—	35	152	146	4th	—
1977-78	Division 1	36	15	4	17	—	—	34	147	159	5th	—
1978-79	Division 1	36	19	5	12	—	—	43	164	131	5th	—
1979-80	Division 1	36	18	3	15	—	—	39	160	139	5th	—
1980-81	Division 1	36	19	9	9	—	—	46	210	128	3rd	—
1981-82	Division 1	36	12	3	21	—	—	27	144	176	8th	—
1982-83	Division 1	32	12	7	13	—	—	31	126	123	8th	—
1983-84	Division 1	32	3	2	27	—	—	8	85	213	10th	Relegated
1984-85	Division 2	—	—	—	—	—	—	—	—	—	—	—
1985-86	Division 2	—	—	—	—	—	—	—	—	—	—	—
1986-87	Division 2	—	—	—	—	—	—	—	—	—	—	Promoted
1987-88	Division 1	14	8	1	5	—	—	23	58	51	5th	—
1988-89	Division 1	18	12	2	4	—	—	26	87	62	2nd	Qualified for Allsvenskan
1988-89	Allsvenskan	18	2	2	14	—	—	6	48	91	10th	—
1989-90	Division 1	14	5	0	9	—	—	13	44	59	8th	—
1990-91	Division 1	14	8	4	2	—	—	25	64	39	4th	—
1991-92	Division 1	18	10	3	5	—	—	23	84	57	2nd	Qualified for Allsvenskan
1991-92	Allsvenskan	18	2	0	16	—	—	4	38	108	10th	—
1992-93	Division 1	14	6	1	7	—	—	14	49	44	7th	—
1993-94	Division 1	14	10	1	3	—	—	27	54	36	3rd	—
1994-95	Division 1	14	6	1	7	—	—	19	60	55	6th	—
1995-96	Division 1	14	9	2	3	—	—	26	65	37	5th	—
1996-97	Division 1	14	10	1	3	—	—	26	72	41	3rd	—
1997-98	Division 1	14	9	1	4	—	—	23	52	39	4th	—
1998-99	Division 1	28	6	2	20	—	—	14	63	126	8th	—
1999-00	Division 1	18	11	2	5	—	—	24	78	47	2nd	—
2000-01	Division 1	28	19	3	6	—	—	41	175	80	1st	Promoted
2001-02	Allsvenskan	32	6	0	19	3	4	10	84	126	10th	Relegated
2002-03	Division 1	14	13	0	1	—	—	26	86	27	1st	Promoted
2003-04	Allsvenskan	32	10	0	19	2	1	35	96	105	9th	—
2004-05	Allsvenskan	32	10	3	17	2	0	37	73	109	9th	—
2005-06	HockeyAllsvenskan	42	14	2	15	6	5	61	115	127	7th	—
2006–07	HockeyAllsvenskan	45	21	0	22	1	1	66	126	152	8th	—
2007-08	HockeyAllsvenskan	45	13	6	21	2	3	52	100	142	12th	—
2008-09	HockeyAllsvenskan	45	23	0	14	1	7	78	124	105	6th	—
2009-10	HockeyAllsvenskan	52	29	0	18	3	2	95	136	108	4th	Qualified for Kvalserien
2009-10	Kvalserien	10	3	—	4	1	2	13	23	23	5th	—
2010-11	HockeyAllsvenskan	52	21	—	18	10	3	86	141	129	6th	—
2011-12	HockeyAllsvenskan	52	16	—	25	5	6	64	119	143	11th	—
2012-13	HockeyAllsvenskan	52	15	—	28	2	7	56	118	143	12th	—
