= Nordic Center Youth =

Nordic Center Youth Nordiska Centerungdomens Förbund
- Abbreviation: NCF
- President: Ellen Marie Rustand Rognerud
- Founded: 1965
- Membership: 6 organisations
- Ideology: Social liberalism
- Political position: Center

Nordic Center Youth (Swedish: Nordiska Centerungdomens Förbund) is a Nordic political organisation for centrist youth and student organisations.

NCF's working language is English.

There are six member organisations in NCF.

== List of member organisations ==
Organisation	Parent party	Country/ region
Finnish Centre Youth (KeNu)	Finnish Centre Party	Finland
Finnish Centre Students (KOL)	Finnish Centre Party	Finland
Svensk Ungdom (SU)	Swedish People's Party	Finland
Senterungdommen (SUL)	Norwegian Centre Party	Norway
Samband Ungra Framsóknarmanna (SUF)	Progressive Party	Iceland
Centerpartiets Ungdomsförbund (CUF)	Swedish Centre Party	Sweden

Former member organisations:

Organisation	Parent party	Country
Radikal Ungdom (RU)	Danish Social Liberal Party	Denmark
Centerstudenter (CS)	Swedish Centre Party	Sweden
Åländsk Ungcenter (ÅU)	Åland Centre	Åland

The board of the organisation in 2025–2026 is as follows:

Country	Name	Organisation
Finland	Emma Isoherranen	SU
Norway	Ellen Marie Rustand Rognerud (Chair)	SUL
Sweden	Elin Kihlstedt (2nd vice)	CUF
Iceland	Birgitta Birgisdóttir	SUF
Finland	Olivia Löytänen	KeNu
Finland	Fanny Storgårds	KOL
