= Finnish Centre Students =

Finnish Centre Students Keskustaopiskelijat (KOL)
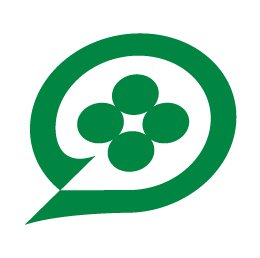
- Chairperson: Arttu Laaksonen
- Founded: 1937
- Headquarters: Helsinki, Finland
- Mother party: Finnish Centre Party
- European affiliation: European Liberal Youth (Lymec)
- Nordic affiliation: Nordic Center Youth
- Website: keskustaopiskelijat.fi

The Finnish Centre Students (Finnish: Keskustaopiskelijat) is one of the oldest political student organizations in Finland and the student wing of the Centre Party.

Famous ex-members include Chairman of Shell Jorma Ollila and one of the most well known Finnish politicians Paavo Väyrynen. Ex-president Urho Kekkonen was giving a speech in the founding event. Ex-Prime Minister Johannes Virolainen was the first Secretary General of the organisation.

From the current Centre Party's parliamentary group for example Katri Kulmuni, Petri Honkonen, Antti Kurvinen, Hilkka Kemppi and Anu Vehviläinen have been active members of the organisation during their studies.

Finnish Centre Students is a member of the European Liberal Youth (LYMEC) and Nordic Center Youth (NCF)

== History ==
The organisation was founded before World War II on 23 April 1937 in Helsinki under name Maalaisliittolaiset Ylioppilaat (Agrarian League Students). The reason for founding was frustration towards Academic Karelia Society, which was turning right in Finnish political spectrum. To underline its anti-fascist political ideas the new political organization invited well known anti-fascist Rudolf Holsti and the future President of Finland Urho Kekkonen to speak in the opening event. The World War II halted activities of the organization for over half a decade. After the war a new name Akateemiset Maaseudun Nuoret (Academic Youth of Countryside) was taken into use. The current name is from year 1966 when the organization had become a strong influencer in Finnish education politics. It demanded all the power to the students in universities and got the support of Finnish Minister of Education Johannes Virolainen. Nevertheless, the other parties did not support the radical idea and Finland got a triangular decision making structure in its universities.

Finnish Centre Students got a lot of power in National Union of University Students in Finland in the 1970s. It got its own man Jorma Ollila (the future Chairman of Shell, Nokia and UPM) to chair the National Union of University Students. Later Finnish Centre Student had a key role in turning the Centre Party into an anti-nuclear party. Ecology and sustainability became its major political issues in the 1980s. One of the major works, which influenced in Finnish Centre Party ecological policy was Avaus äärikeskustaan (Opening to the Extreme Centre). It was written by the Finnish Centre Student activists Alpo Rusi and Juha Kuisma. The work was harsh criticism towards politics of economic growth.
