= Åländsk Ungcenter =

Åland Youth Centre Åländsk Ungcenter
- Ideology: Centrism; Agrarianism (Nordic)
- Colours: Green
- Mother party: Åland Centre
- Nordic affiliation: Nordic Center Youth

Ålandsk Ungcenter ("Åland Youth Centre"), or simply Ungcenter, is the political youth organisation of the Åland Centre party. It was founded in 1977.

The organisation is a member of the Nordic Center Youth. It's also represented in the Nordic Youth Council.
