= Radikal Ungdom =

Danish political youth group

Social Liberal Youth of Denmark Radikal Ungdom
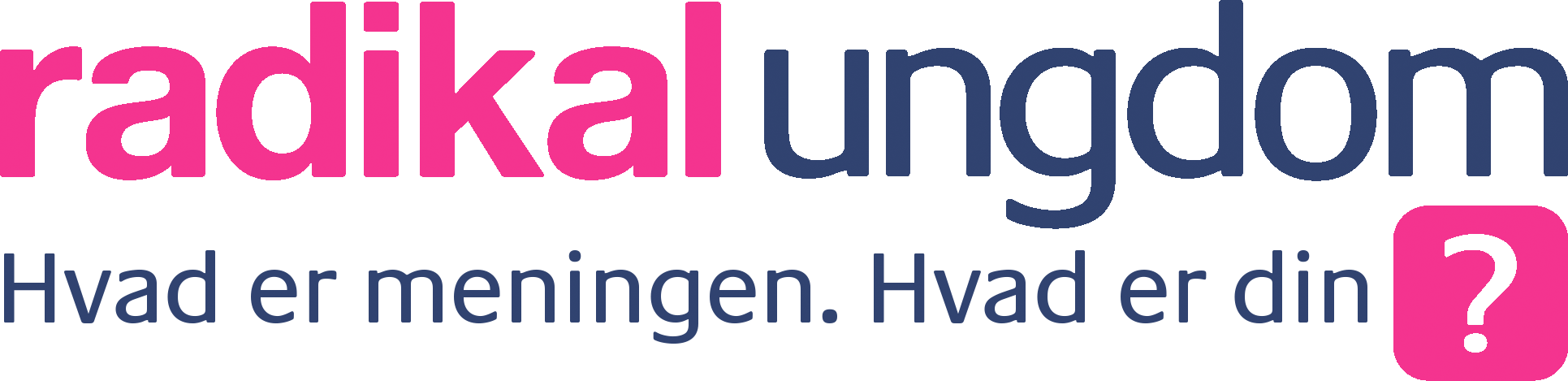
- Chairman: Malika Bøge Rosenskjold
- Treasurer: Jonas Snog Morbjerg
- Founded: 1911 (reformed 1994)
- Headquarters: Bergthorasgade 15; Islands Brygge; Copenhagen
- Ideology: Social liberalism Radicalism
- Mother party: Danish Social Liberal Party
- International affiliation: International Federation of Liberal & Radical Youth; European Liberal Youth
- Nordic affiliation: Association of Young Nordic Social Liberals (SNUS)
- Website: www.radikalungdom.dk

The Danish Social Liberal Youth (Danish: Radikal Ungdom, literally Radical Youth, abbreviated RU), is a political youth organization in Denmark, built around the ideals of social liberalism. Radical indicates a connection to 19th and 20th century radicalism, a connection shared with the organisation's mother party, the Danish Social Liberal Party.

The current organization was founded on April 30, 1994 under the name Radikal Ungdom of 1994, after the former youth organization Radikal Ungdom was dissolved due to widespread fraud with funding from the Danish Youth Council. The organization bore the name Radikal Ungdom of 1994, until it was changed back to Radikal Ungdom at the organisation's national congress in 2015. The original organisation was founded in Copenhagen in 1904 and merged into a larger national organization founded in 1911.

The Social Liberal Youth of Denmark is a member of three liberal international umbrella organizations: The Nordic Centre Youth (NCF), European Liberal Youth (LYMEC) and the International Federation of Liberal Youth (IFLRY).

At the 2019 party congress, Sigrid Friis Proschowsky stepped down as party president after two years of leadership. She was succeeded by Lukas Lunøe. Caroline Valentiner-Branth and Cornelius Sode were elected as organizational vice-president and political vice-president respectively.

In the 2026 danish general election, chairperson Anastasia Olivia Milthers was elected to parliament, as a result, she resigned from her post. In april, an extraordinary general assembly, the first since 2004 was held, where Malika Bøge Rosenskjold was elected as new chairperson.

== Party presidents after 1994 ==
- 2026-: Malika Bøge Rosenskjold
- 2024-2026: Anastasia Olivia Milthers
- 2022–2024: Maria Georgi Sloth
- 2020–2022: Jacob Robsøe
- 2019–2020: Lukas Lunøe
- 2017–2019: Sigrid Friis Proschowsky
- 2015–2017: Victor Boysen
- 2013–2015: Christopher Røhl
- 2011–2013: Ditte Søndergaard
- 2009–2011: Simon Dyhr
- 2008–2009: Emil Dyred
- 2006–2008: Andreas Steenberg
- 2003–2006: Zenia Stampe
- 2000–2003: Simon Emil Ammitzbøll
- 1999–2000: Majken Fjeldgaard Arensbach
- 1997–1999: Christian Brix Møller
- 1996–1997: Anders Thomsen
- 1994–1996: Morten Rixen

== See also ==
- Politics of Denmark
- Radicalism
