= Svensk Ungdom =

Political youth organization in Finland

Swedish Youth Svensk Ungdom
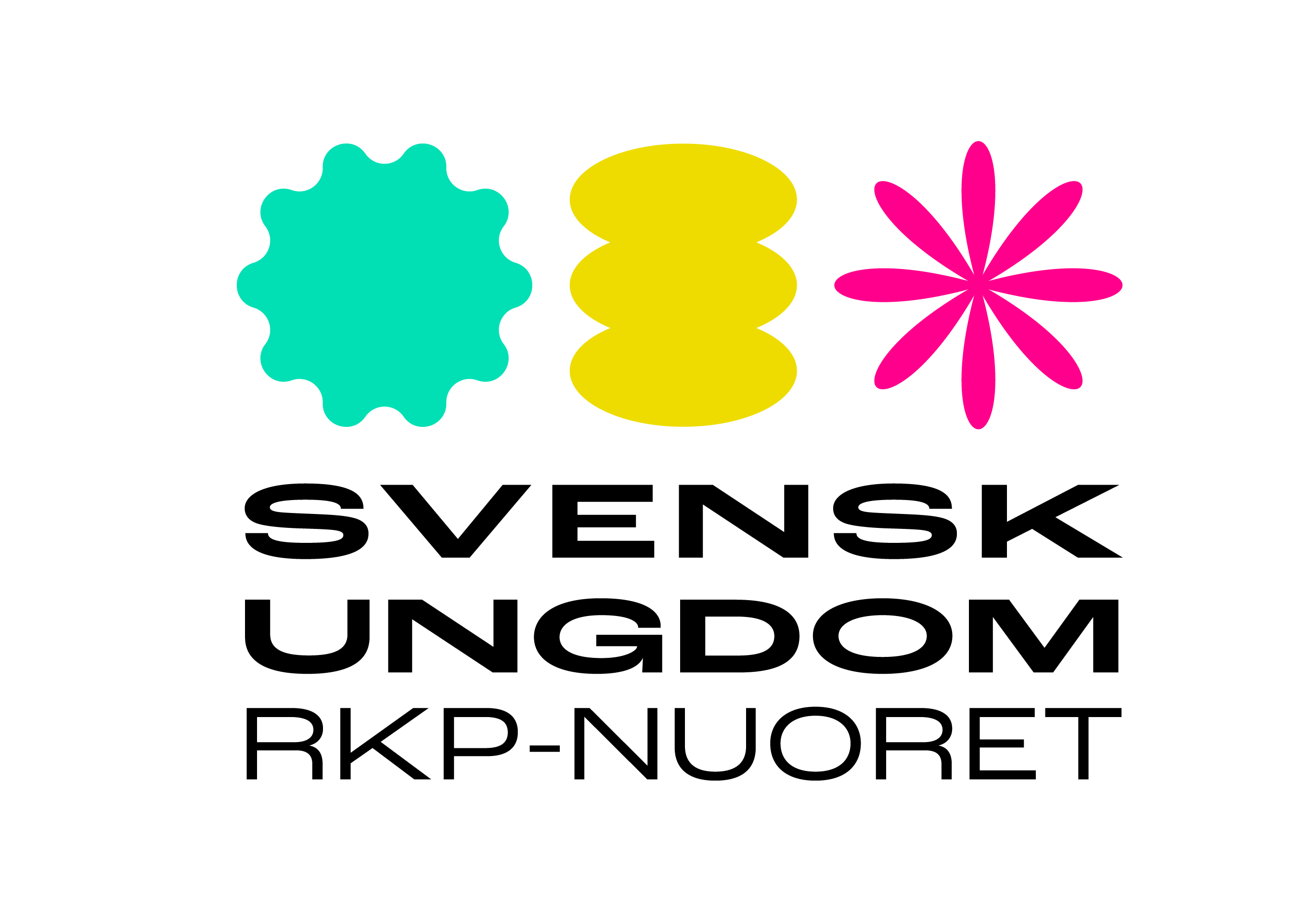
- Chairperson: Emma Isoherranen
- Secretary General: Nicolina Nordman
- Founded: 1943
- Headquarters: Helsinki
- Membership: 2500
- Ideology: Liberalism; Swedish-speaking minority interests Pro-Europeanism
- Mother party: Swedish People's Party of Finland
- International affiliation: International Federation of Liberal Youth
- European affiliation: European Liberal Youth
- Nordic affiliation: Nordic Center Youth
- Magazine: Liber
- Website: https://su.fi/en/home/

Swedish Youth (Swedish: Svensk Ungdom, abbr. SU) is a political youth organization (age between 14 and 30) in Finland. It is the youth wing of the Swedish People's Party of Finland. The organisation claims 2,500 members. It was founded in 1943.

Svensk Ungdom is a member of the International Federation of Liberal Youth, European Liberal Youth and Nordic Center Youth.

== Organization ==
Until 2008 there was a separate student organisation, Liberala studerande LSK ("Liberal Students"), but since then it functions as a committee inside SU.

Several previous chairpersons of SU, such as Astrid Thors for example, have later been ministers in the Finnish government.

The newspaper of the organization is Liber.

Svensk Ungdom's current board consists of eight people and is chaired by Frida Sigfrids.

Svensk Ungdom's highest governing body is its annual congress (Swedish: Kongressen), which takes place every spring around April. It decides on the political guidelines and the organisation's board members. In 2020 the annual congress was moved to September due to the COVID-19 pandemic. For the same reason the annual congress of 2021 was held entirely virtually for the first time.
