= Anastasia Milthers =

Danish politician (born 2002)

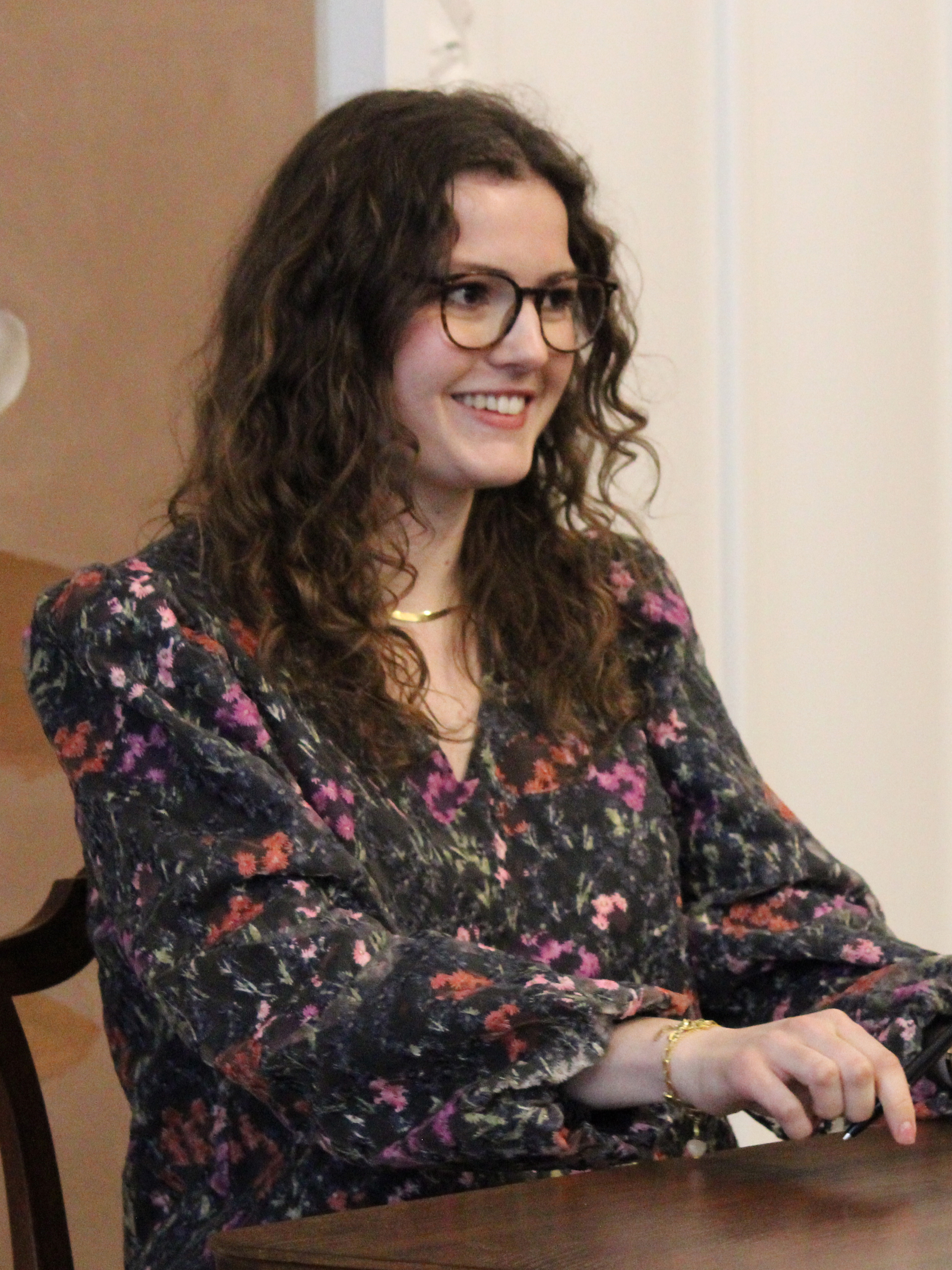
- Milthers in 2026

Member of the Folketing
- Incumbent
- Assumed office 24 March 2026
- Constituency: Funen

Personal details
- Born: 6 January 2002 (age 24)
- Party: Danish Social Liberal Party

Anastasia Olivia Milthers (born 6 January 2002) is a Danish politician who was elected member of the Folketing in 2026. She has served as chairwoman of Radikal Ungdom since 2024.

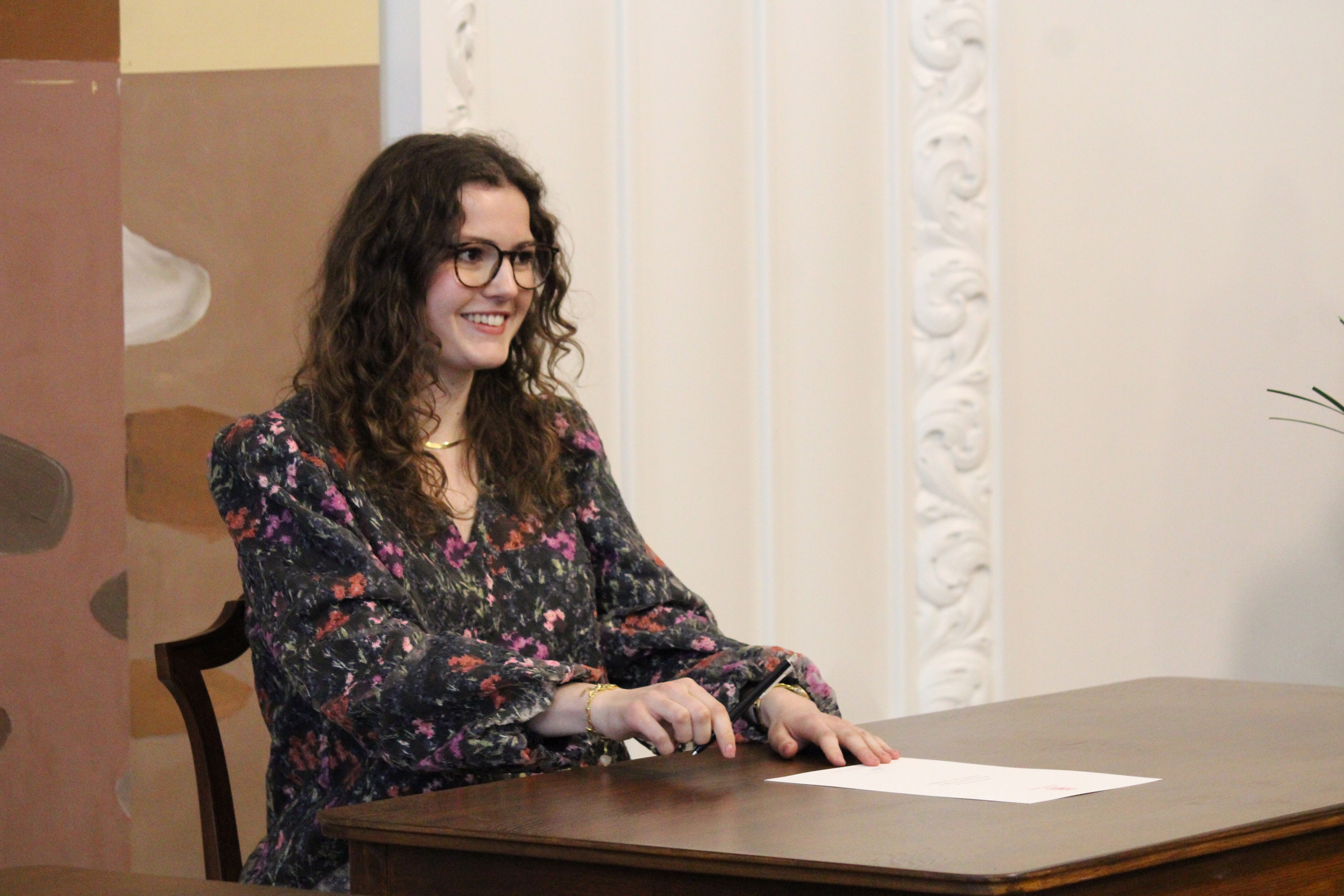
Milthers signing a pledge to uphold the Danish Constitution at Christiansborg, 14 April 2026
