= Finnish Centre Youth =

Finnish Centre Youth Keskustanuoret
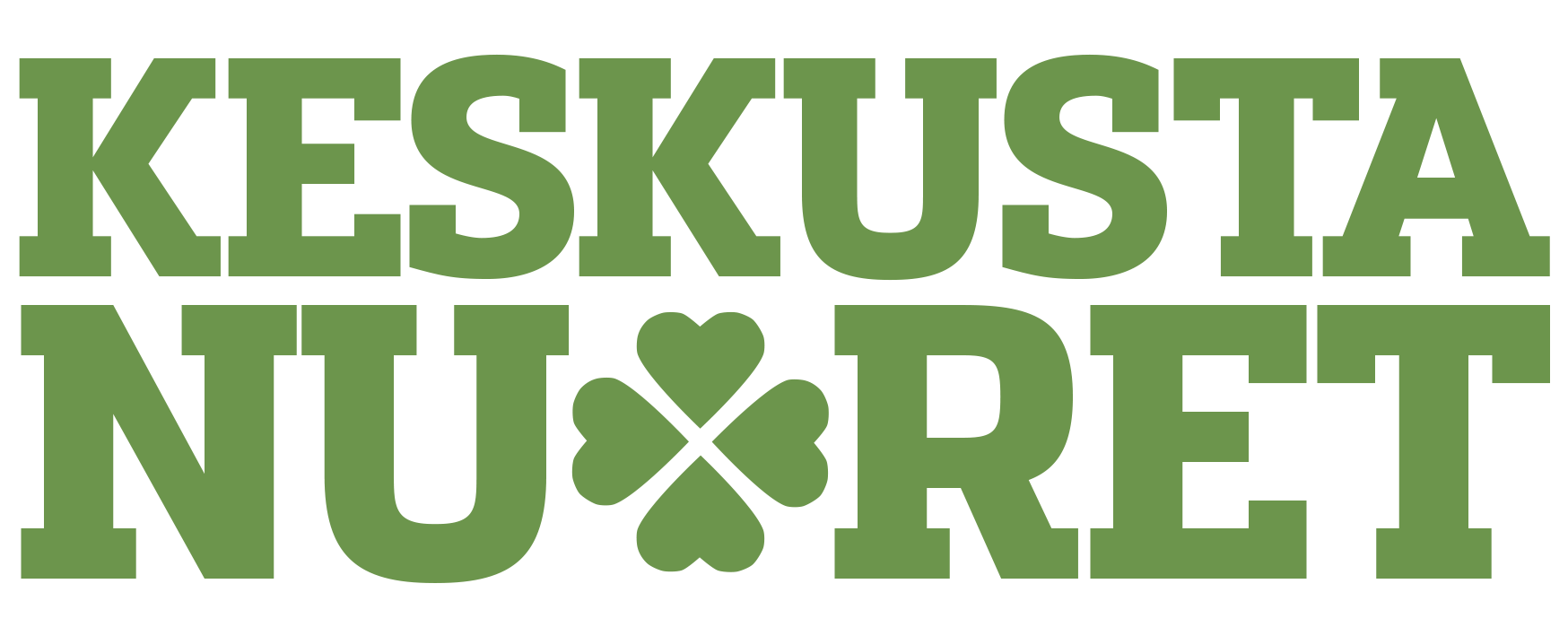
- Chairperson: Jere Tapio
- Founded: 1945
- Headquarters: Helsinki, Finland
- Mother party: Finnish Centre Party
- International affiliation: International Federation of Liberal Youth (IFLRY)
- European affiliation: European Liberal Youth (Lymec)
- Nordic affiliation: Nordic Center Youth (NCF)
- Magazine: Juuri
- Website: keskustanuoret.fi

The Finnish Centre Youth (Finnish: Keskustanuoret) is a Finnish political youth organisation with 1320 members. It is the youth wing of the Centre Party. It is formed by 19 regional organisations and approximately 400 local associations.

The organisation was formerly known as Nuoren Keskustan Liitto and until 1964 Maaseudun Nuorten Liitto.

Finnish Centre Youth is a member of the European Liberal Youth (LYMEC), International Federation of Liberal Youth (IFLRY) and a founding member of the Nordic Centre Youth (NCF).

== History ==
The organisation was founded after World War II on 30 June 1945 in Salo as a union of 14 regional youth organisations of the Agrarian League. The Salo meeting elected Johannes Virolainen as the first president of the organisation. Two decades later, Virolainen became the Prime Minister of Finland.

The post-war era was a politically active time in Finland. The new centrist youth organisation rapidly gained new members, reaching 50 000 members in 1954 and 70 000 members in 1962. Since then, the number of members has been gradually declining (the end of 70s being an exception).

== Famous members ==
Tens of Finnish Ministers and hundreds of members of Finnish Parliament have background in Finnish Centre Youth. This is the list of most notables of them:

- Ahti Karjalainen, Prime Minister of Finland 1962-1963 and 1970–1971, Foreign Minister of Finland 1959-1962, 1964–1970 and 1971–1975
- Anneli Jäätteenmäki, First woman as a Prime Minister of Finland 2003, Speaker of the Parliament of Finland 2003
- Esko Aho, Prime Minister of Finland 1991-1995, Speaker of the Parliament of Finland 1991
- Heikki Hasu, Olympic Gold Medalist, Member of Finnish Parliament 1962-1970
- Johannes Virolainen, Prime Minister of Finland 1964-1966, Speaker of the Parliament of Finland 1966-1968 and 1979–1983
- Mari Kiviniemi, Minister for Foreign Trade and Development (Finland) 2005-2006, Minister of Public Administration and Local Government 2007-
- Marjatta Väänänen, Minister of Culture 1972-1975; Minister of Education 1976-1977
- Martti Miettunen, Prime Minister of Finland 1961-1962 and 1975–1977
- Matti Vanhanen, Prime Minister of Finland 2003-2010, Minister of Defence of Finland 2003
- Mauri Pekkarinen, Minister of Trade and Industry 2003-, Minister of the Interior (Finland) 1991-1995
- Olli Rehn, European Commissioner for Economic and Financial Affairs 2010-, European Commissioner for Enlargement and European Neighbourhood Policy 2004-2010, European Commissioner for Enterprise and Information Society 2004
- Paavo Väyrynen, Minister of Education, 1975–1976; Minister of Labour 1976-1977; Minister of Foreign Affairs 1977-1987 and 1991–1993; Deputy Prime Minister 1983-1987; Vice-chairman of the ELDR Group 1997-2004; Minister for Foreign Trade and Development 2007-
- Pekka Puska, President of World Heart Federation, Member of Finnish Parliament 1987-1991
- Seppo Kääriäinen, Minister of Defence of Finland 2004-2007, Minister of Trade and Industry and Minister at the Ministry of Foreign Affairs 1993-1995
- Sylvi Saimo, Olympic Gold Medalist (sprint canoer), Member of Finnish Parliament 1966-1978
