= Hilkka Kemppi =

Finnish politician (born 1988)

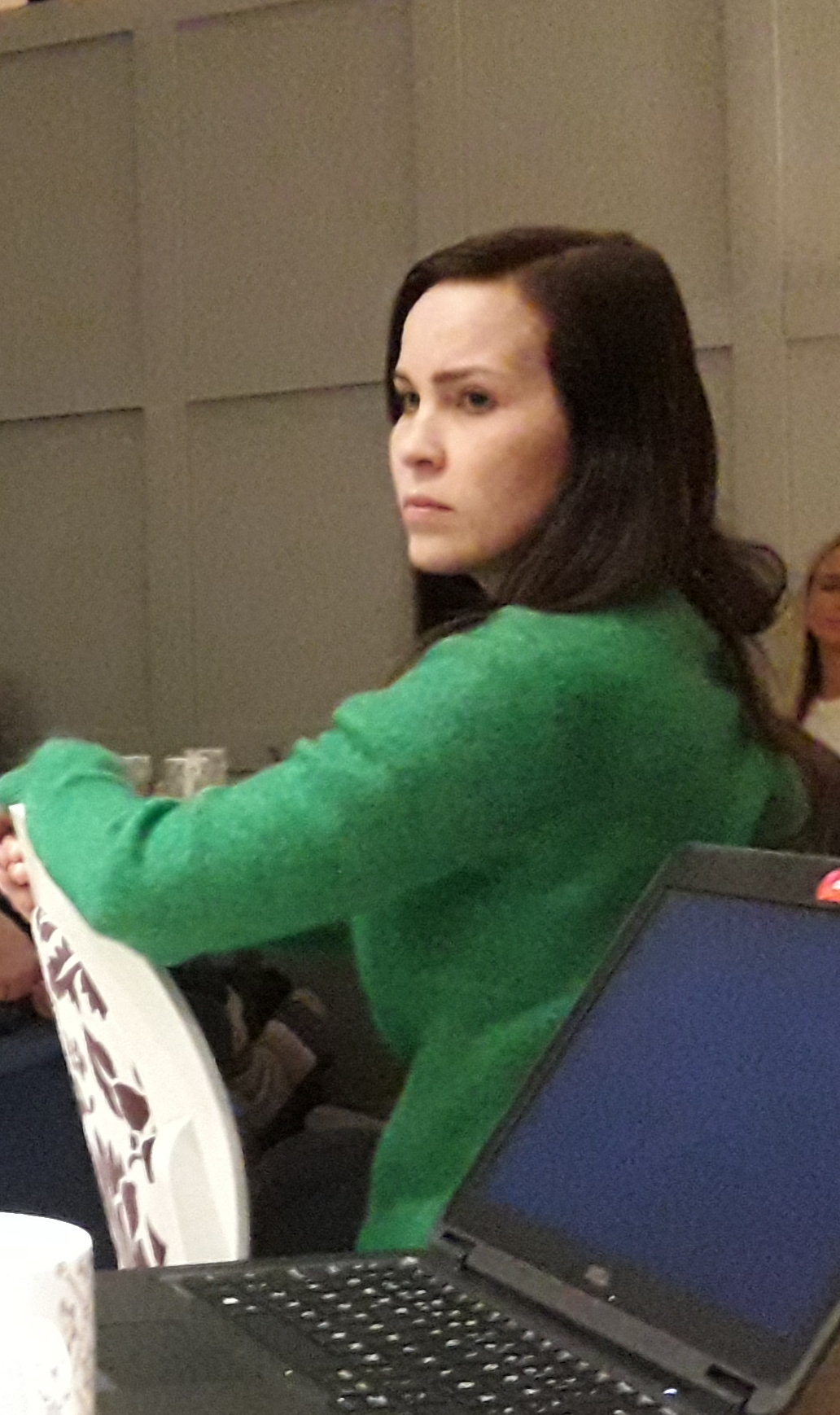
- Hilkka Kemppi in 2019

Member of the Finnish Parliament for Tavastia
- Incumbent
- Assumed office 17 April 2019

Personal details
- Born: May 19, 1988 (age 38) Asikkala, Päijät-Häme, Finland
- Party: Centre Party
- Education: University of Lapland
- Website: https://www.hilkkakemppi.fi/

Hilkka Kemppi (born 19 May 1988) is a Finnish politician currently serving in the Parliament of Finland for the Centre Party at the Tavastia constituency.
