= Centre Party (Finland) =

Agrarian political party in Finland

Centre Party Suomen Keskusta (Finnish) Centern i Finland (Swedish)
- Abbreviation: Kesk (Finnish); C (Swedish)
- Chairperson: Antti Kaikkonen
- Secretary: Antti Siika-aho
- Parliamentary group leader: Antti Kurvinen
- Deputy chairs: Tuomas Kettunen; Hilkka Kemppi; Markus Lohi
- Founded: 1906; 120 years ago
- Merger of: SML; EPNM
- Headquarters: Apollonkatu 11A, 00100 Helsinki
- Newspaper: Suomenmaa
- Think tank: Ajatuspaja Alkio
- Student wing: Finnish Centre Students
- Youth wing: Finnish Centre Youth
- Women's wing: Finnish Centre Women
- Children’s wing: Vesaiset
- Membership (2021): ▼ c. 77,000
- Ideology: Agrarianism (Nordic); Liberalism
- Political position: Centre
- European affiliation: Alliance of Liberals and Democrats for Europe
- European Parliament group: Renew Europe
- International affiliation: Liberal International; Historical: Green International
- Nordic affiliation: Centre Group
- Colours: Green
- Eduskunta: 22 / 200
- European Parliament: 2 / 15
- Municipalities: 2,623 / 8,586
- County seats: 304 / 1,379

Website
- keskusta.fi

The Centre Party (Finnish: Suomen Keskusta [ˈsuo̯men ˈkeskustɑ], Kesk; Swedish: Centern i Finland, C), officially the Centre Party of Finland, is an agrarian political party in Finland. Ideologically, the Centre Party is positioned in the centre of the political spectrum. It has been described as being liberal. The party's leader is Antti Kaikkonen, who was elected in June 2024 to succeed former minister Annika Saarikko. As of June 2023, the party has been a part of the parliamentary opposition.

Founded in 1906 as the Agrarian League (Finnish: Maalaisliitto; Swedish: Agrarförbundet), the party represented rural communities and supported the decentralisation of political power from Helsinki. In the 1920s, the party emerged as the main rival to the SDP. Kyösti Kallio, the party's first prime minister, held the office for four times between 1922 and 1937. After World War II, the party settled as one of the four major political parties in Finland, alongside the SDP, the National Coalition Party and the Finnish People's Democratic League until the 1980s. Urho Kekkonen served as President of Finland from 1956 to 1982, by far the longest period of any president. The name Centre Party was adopted in 1965 and Centre of Finland in 1988. The Centre Party was the largest party in Parliament from 2003 to 2011, during which time Matti Vanhanen was prime minister for seven years. By 2011, the party was reduced in parliamentary representation from the largest party to the fourth largest, but it reclaimed its status as the largest party in 2015. In 2019, it suffered a considerable defeat, losing 18 of 49 seats.

As a Nordic agrarian party, the Centre Party's political influence is greatest in small and rural municipalities, where it often holds a majority of the seats in the municipal councils. Decentralisation is the policy that is most characteristic of the Centre Party which has been the ruling party in Finland a number of times since Finnish independence. Twelve of the Prime Ministers of Finland, three of the Presidents and a former European Commissioner for Economic and Financial Affairs have been from the party. The Centre Party is the mother organisation of the Finnish Centre Students, the Finnish Centre Youth and the Finnish Centre Women.

== History ==
=== Founding ===
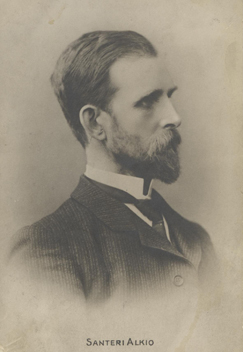
Santeri Alkio, the ideological father of the Centre Party.

The party was founded in 1906 as a movement of citizens in the Finnish countryside. Before Finnish independence, political power in Finland was centralised in the capital and to the estates of the realm. The centralisation gave space for a new political movement. In 1906, two agrarian movements were founded. They merged in 1908 to become one political party known as the Agrarian League or Maalaisliitto. An older, related movement was the temperance movement which had overlapping membership and gave future to Agrarian League activists experience in working in an organisation.

=== Santeri Alkio's ideology ===
Soon the ideas of humanity, education, the spirit of the land, yeomanly liberty, decentralisation, "the issue of poor people", progressivism and later the "green wave" became the main political phrases used to describe the ideology of the party. Santeri Alkio was the most important ideological father of the party.

=== Defending the republic ===
At the dawn of Finnish independence, conservative social forces made an attempt to establish the Kingdom of Finland. The Agrarian League opposed monarchism fiercely, even though monarchists claimed that a new king from the German Empire and Hohenzollern would have safeguarded Finnish foreign relations. At this time, anti-anarchist peasants threatened the existence of the party.

Because around forty Social Democratic members of the Parliament had escaped to Russia after the Finnish Civil War and about fifty others had been arrested, the Agrarian League members of the Parliament became the only republicans in Parliament in 1918. Nevertheless, the news about the problems of the German Empire from German liberals encouraged the fight of Agrarian League in the Parliament.

The Agrarian League managed to maintain the republican voices in the Parliament until the fall of the German Empire which ruined the dreams of the monarchists. The relentless opposition to the monarchy was rewarded in the 1919 Finnish parliamentary election and the party became the biggest non-socialist party in Finland with 19.7% of the votes.

=== Post-war period ===
After the 1919 Finnish parliamentary election, the centrist and progressive forces, including the Agrarian League, were constant members in Finnish governments. Their moderate attitude in restless post-war Finland secured a steady growth in following elections. The party formed many centrist minority governments with National Progressive Party and got its first prime ministers (Kyösti Kallio in 1922 and Juho Sunila in 1927).

=== Conciliation between the left and the right ===
For the Agrarian League, the centrist governments were just a transitional period toward an era which would integrate the red and white sides of the Civil War into one nation. Nevertheless, not everyone was happy with the conciliatory politics of centrist governments. The extreme right Lapua Movement grew bigger and bigger in the Agrarian League strongholds in the countryside. Many party members joined the new radical movement. The Lapua Movement organised assaults and kidnappings in Finland between 1929 and 1932. In 1930, after the kidnapping of progressive president Kaarlo Juho Ståhlberg, the Agrarian League broke off all its ties to the movement and got a new political enemy in the countryside, the Patriotic People's Movement (IKL) which was founded after the Lapua Movement was outlawed.

In the 1933 Finnish parliamentary election, the main campaign issues were the differing attitudes toward democracy and the rule of law between the Patriotic Electoral Alliance (the National Coalition Party and the Patriotic People's Movement) and the Legality Front (the Social Democrats, the Agrarian League, the Swedish People's Party and the Progressives). The Patriotic Electoral Alliance favoured continuing the search for suspected communists, the Communist Party and its affiliated organisations in the spirit of the Lapua Movement. The Legality Front did not want to spend any significant time on searching suspected communists but rather wanted to concentrate on keeping the far-right in check. The Legality Front won the elections, but the Agrarian League lost a part of its support.

=== Cooperation with the Social Democrats ===
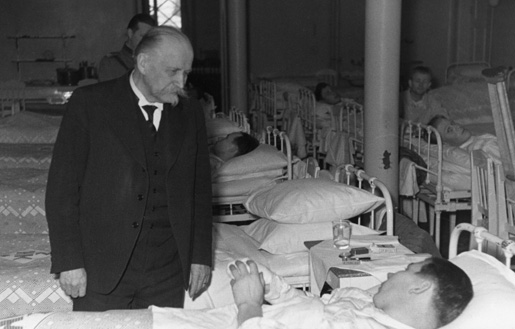
Finland's centrist president Kyösti Kallio on a Christmas 1939 visit to a military hospital.

Because of fierce opposition of the president Pehr Evind Svinhufvud, the Social Democrats remained outside the government and the Agrarian League was part of the centre-right governments until 1937. In the 1937 Finnish presidential election, the Agrarian League candidate Kyösti Kallio was elected president with the votes of centrist (Agrarian and Progressive) and social-democratic coalition which wanted to ensure that President Svinhufvud would not be re-elected. The new president allowed the first centre-left government to be formed in Finland and a new era had begun.

=== World War II ===
With the outbreak of the Winter War, a government of national unity was formed. President Kallio died shortly after the war.

=== Kekkonen, the centrist statesman ===
In 1956, Urho Kekkonen, the candidate of the Agrarian League, was elected President of Finland after serving as prime minister several times and remained president until 1982. Kekkonen continued the active neutrality policy of his predecessor Juho Kusti Paasikivi, a doctrine which came to be known as the Paasikivi–Kekkonen line. Under it, Finland retained its independence while being able to trade with NATO members and those of the Warsaw Pact.

=== Pressure of populism ===
Veikko Vennamo, a vocal agrarian politician, ran into serious disagreement particularly with the then-Party Secretary of the Agrarian Party Arvo Korsimo, who was excluded from the parliamentary group. As a result, Vennamo immediately started building his own organisation in 1959 and founded a new party, the Finnish Rural Party (Suomen maaseudun puolue, SMP). Vennamo was a populist and became a critic of Kekkonen and political corruption within the old parties, particularly the Agrarian League. Although this party had some success, it was essentially tied to Veikko Vennamo's person. His son Pekka Vennamo was able to raise the party to new success and into government in 1983, but after this the Rural Party's support declined steadily and eventually the party went bankrupt in 1995. Immediately after this, the right-wing populist Finns Party (Perussuomalaiset) was founded by former members of SMP.

=== Transformation into the Centre Party ===
In 1965, the party changed its name to the Centre Party (Keskustapuolue) and in 1988 took its current Centre Party of Finland name (Suomen Keskusta). Despite urbanisation of Finland and a temporary nadir in support, the party managed to continue to attract voters.

The Liberal People's Party (LKP) became a member party of the Centre Party in 1982. The two separated again after the success of the Liberal People's Party in the 1985 Swedish general election.

=== Division over EU membership ===
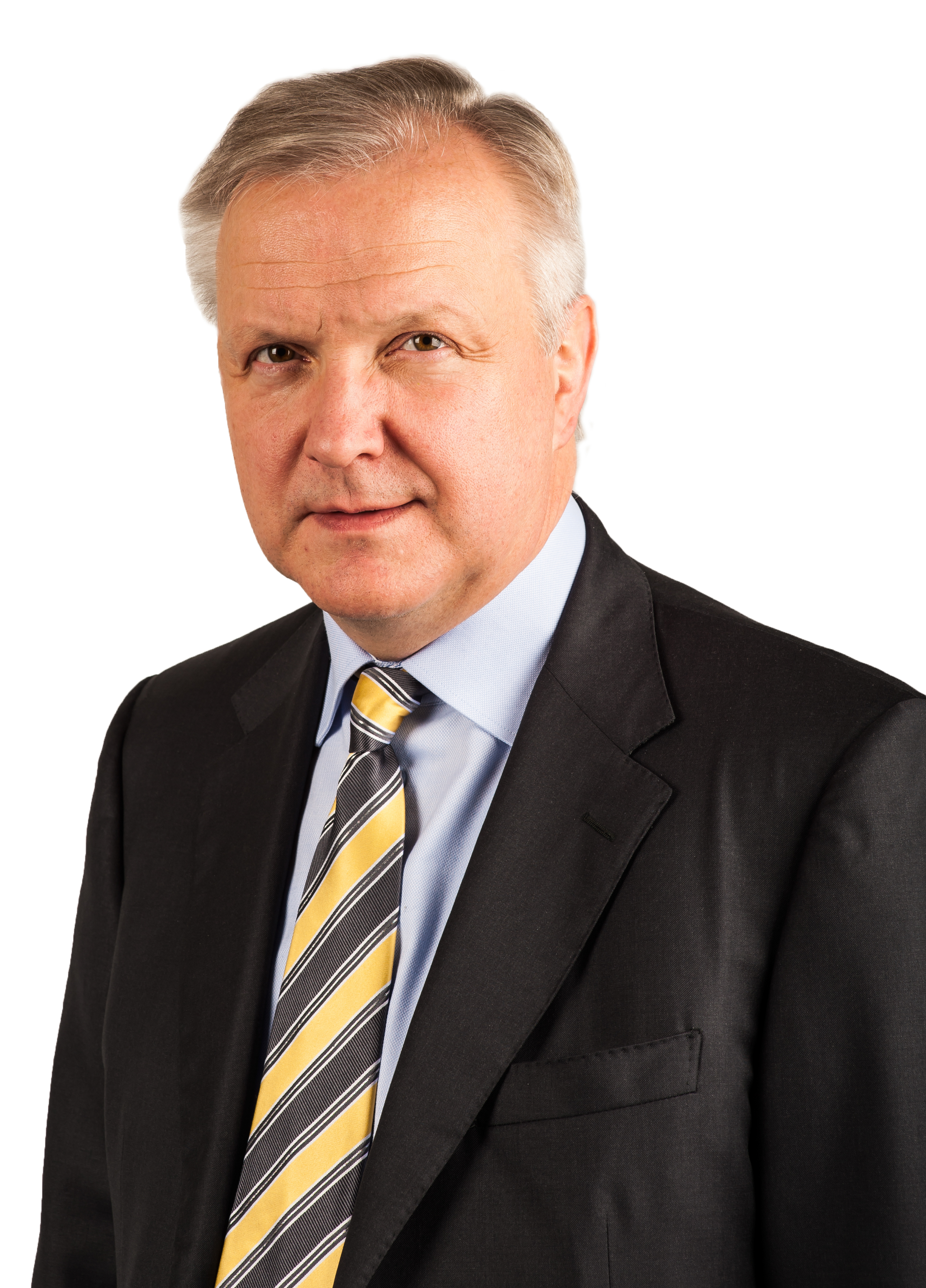
Olli Rehn, European Commissioner for Economic and Monetary Affairs and the Euro (2010–2014) and the candidate supported by the centre in the 2024 election.

The Centre Party was a key player in making the decision to apply for Finnish EU membership in 1992. As the leading governing party, its support for the application was crucial. The party itself, both leadership and supporters, was far from united on the issue. In the Parliament, 22 out of 55 Centre MPs voted against the application. In June 1994, the party congress decided to support EU membership (by 1607 votes to 834), but only after the prime minister and party chair Esko Aho threatened to resign if the party were to oppose the membership.

The centrist tradition of defending equal political and economic rights for peripheral areas was reflected in the internal resistance that opposed chairperson Aho's ambitions to lead Finland into the EU. The Centre Party was in opposition from 1995 to 2003 and opposed adopting the euro as Finland's currency. The party accepted the euro after regaining power in 2003.

=== 2012 and beyond ===
The party congress in June 2012 elected the newcomer Juha Sipilä to replace Mari Kiviniemi as the party's chair. Sipilä defeated young deputy chairperson Tuomo Puumala and a well known veteran politician Paavo Väyrynen in the voting.

The previous chairperson Mari Kiviniemi succeeded Matti Vanhanen as prime minister in 2010, serving in the office for one year. At the time, she was the Centre Party's third Prime Minister of Finland in succession. Anneli Jäätteenmäki preceded Vanhanen, she was also the first woman to be Prime Minister of Finland. She did not seek another term as party chair.

Olli Rehn, a member of the party, served in the European Commission for ten years between 2004 and 2014 and was the European Commissioner for Economic and Financial Affairs and the Euro from 2010 to 2014.

The Centre Party was the biggest loser of the 2011 Finnish parliamentary election, losing 16 seats and going from largest party to fourth place. Its support was lower than in any parliamentary election since 1917. It won the 2015 Finnish parliamentary election and formed a coalition with the Finns Party and the National Coalition Party.

In March 2016, the Centre Party announced that its candidate for the 2018 Finnish presidential election would be the former prime minister Matti Vanhanen, the first declared presidential candidate in the race.

The Centre Party was again the biggest loser in the 2019 Finnish parliamentary election, losing 18 seats and going from largest party to fourth place. The party's support was even lower than in 2011. Due to the devastating defeat, Sipilä consequently announced that he would continue as the party chair only until the Centre Party's next convention in September 2019. The party congress in September 2019 elected the Minister of Economic Affairs Katri Kulmuni to replace Sipilä as the party's chair.

On 5 September 2020, during a party congress, Annika Saarikko was elected as the leader of the Centre Party to replace Katri Kulmuni.

During late 2022, The Centre Party was polling at its lowest record in support in polls with less than 10% support.

== Ideology ==
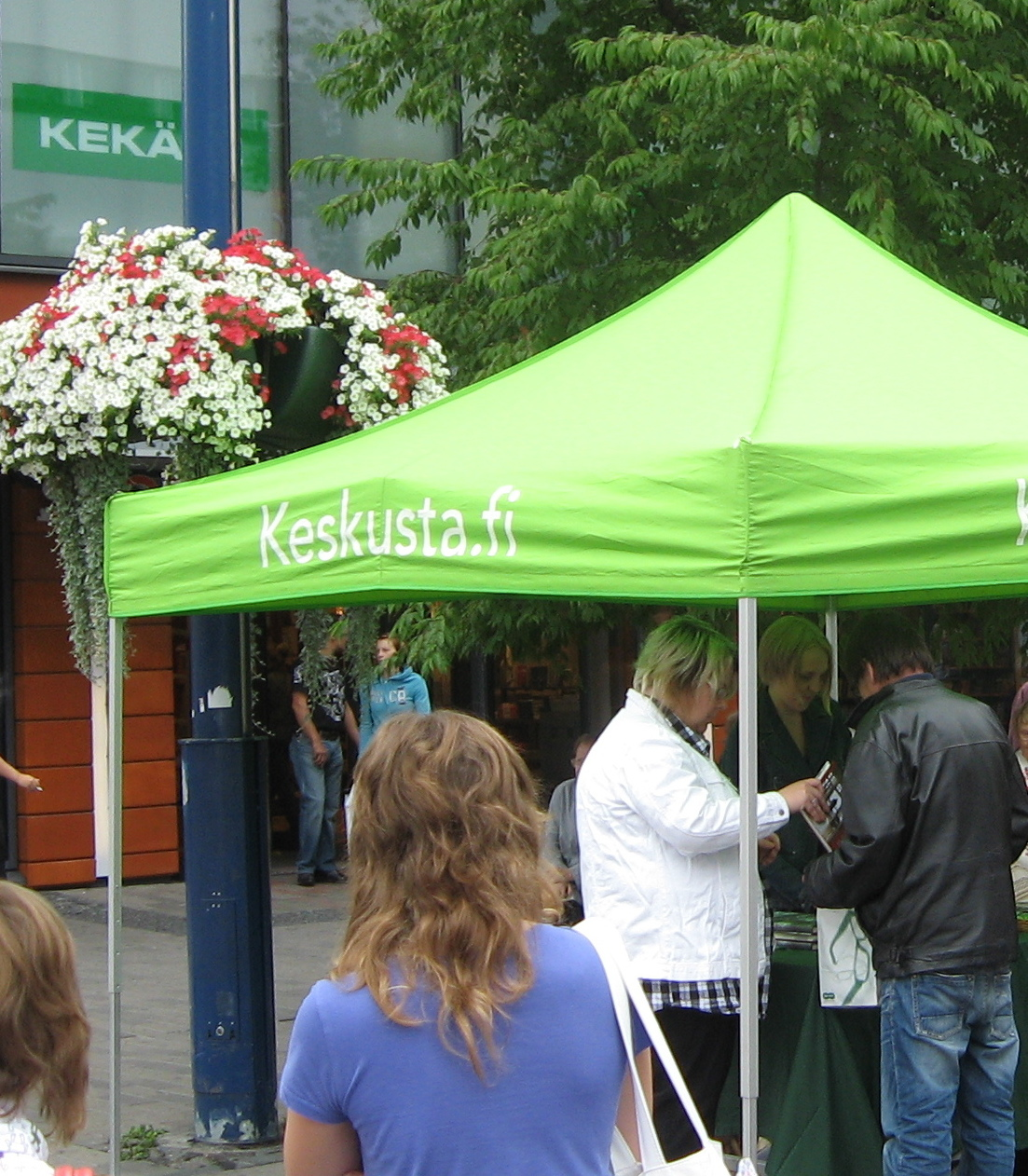
A Centre Party campaign in Jyväskylä.

The ideology of the party is unusual in the European context. Unlike many other large parties in Europe, its ideology is not primarily based on economic systems. Rather, the ideas of humanity, education, the spirit of the land, yeomanly liberty, decentralisation, "the issue of poor people", environmentalism and progressivism play a key role in Centre Party politician speeches and writings. From the very beginning of its presence, the party has supported the idea of decentralisation.

Despite belonging to the Liberal International, the Centre Party does not play quite the same role in Finnish politics as do liberal parties in other countries because the party evolved from agrarian roots.

The party has a more conservative wing, and prominent conservatives within the party such as Paavo Väyrynen have criticised overt economic and cultural liberalism. In addition, the 2010 party congress voted to oppose same-sex marriage. When the Finnish Parliament voted on same-sex marriage in 2014, 30 of the 36 Centre MPs voted against it.

The party is also divided on the issue of deepening European integration and contains a notable Eurosceptic faction based on its more rural interests. The party expressly rejects a federal Europe. The Centre Party was originally opposed to Finland's membership in the euro currency, but the party later stated that it would not seek to withdraw from the Economic and Monetary Union once Finland had entered.

In Finland, there is no large party that supports liberalism per se. Instead, liberalism is found in most major parties including the Centre Party which supports decentralisation, free will, free and fair trade and small enterprise. The Centre Party characteristically supports decentralisation, particularly the decrease of central power, the increase of the power of municipalities and the even spread of the population in Finland. During the party's premierships between 2003 and 2011, these policies were also manifested as transferrals of certain government agencies from the capital to smaller cities in the regions.

Throughout the period of Finland's independence, the Centre Party has been the party most often represented in the government. The country's longest-serving president, Urho Kekkonen, was a member of the party as were two other presidents.

Today, only a small portion of the votes given to the party come from farmers. As such, the Centre Party draws support from a wide range of professions. Rural Finland and small towns still form the strongest base of support for the party, although it has also strived for a breakthrough in the major southern cities. In the 2011 Finnish parliamentary election, the party received 4.5% of the votes cast in the capital, Helsinki, compared to the 33.4% in the largely rural electoral district of Oulu.

== Organisation ==
=== Structure ===
In the organisation of the Centre Party, local associations dominate the election of party leaders, the selection of local candidates and drafting of policy. The headquarters in Apollonkatu, Helsinki leads financing and organisation of elections.

The party has 2,500 local associations which have 160,000 individual members. The local associations elect their representatives to the party congress which elects the party leadership and decide on policy. The local associations form also 21 regional organisations which have also their representatives in the party congress.

The party congress is the highest decision-making body of the party. It elects the chairperson, three deputy chairs, the secretary-general and the party council.

With 135 members, the party council is the main decision-making body between the party congresses. The party council elects the party government (excluding the leaders elected by the party congress) and the working committee. The party council, the party government and the Working Committee must have at least 40% representation of both sexes.

The Finnish Centre Students, the Finnish Centre Women and the Finnish Centre Youth have their own local and regional organisations which also name their representatives to the party congress.

=== People ===
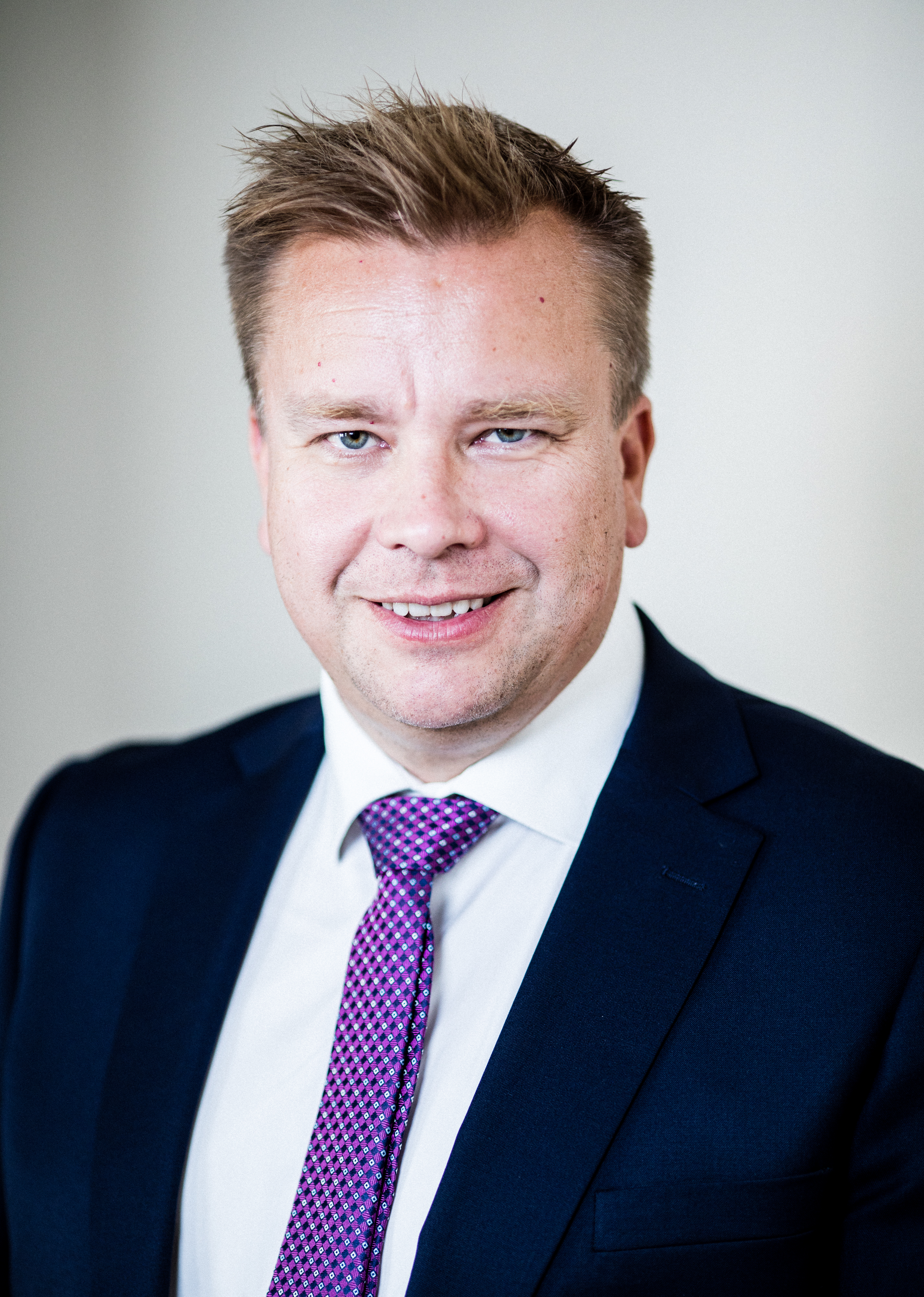
Antti Kaikkonen, Chairperson of the Centre Party of Finland

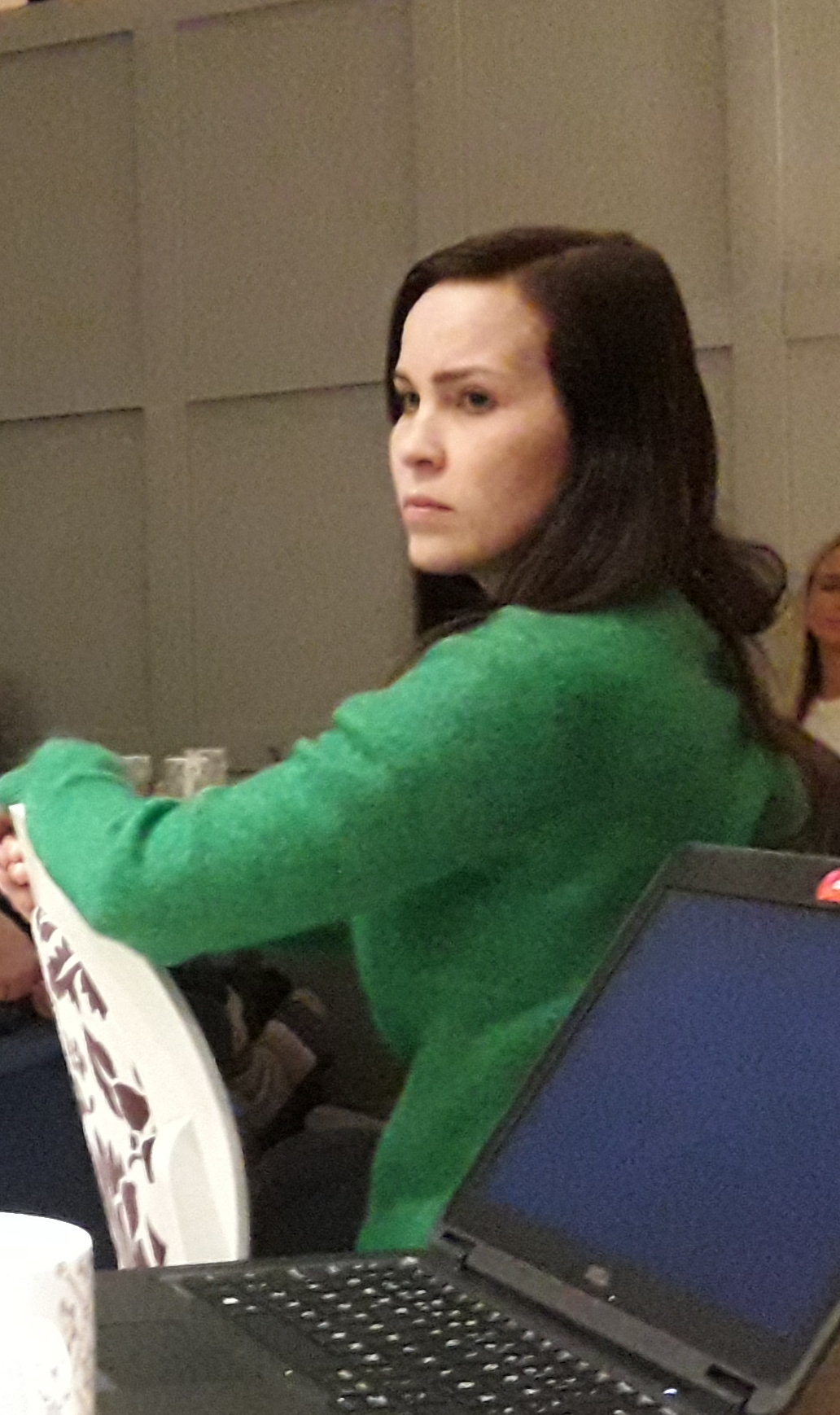
Hilkka Kemppi, Deputy Chair of the Centre Party of Finland

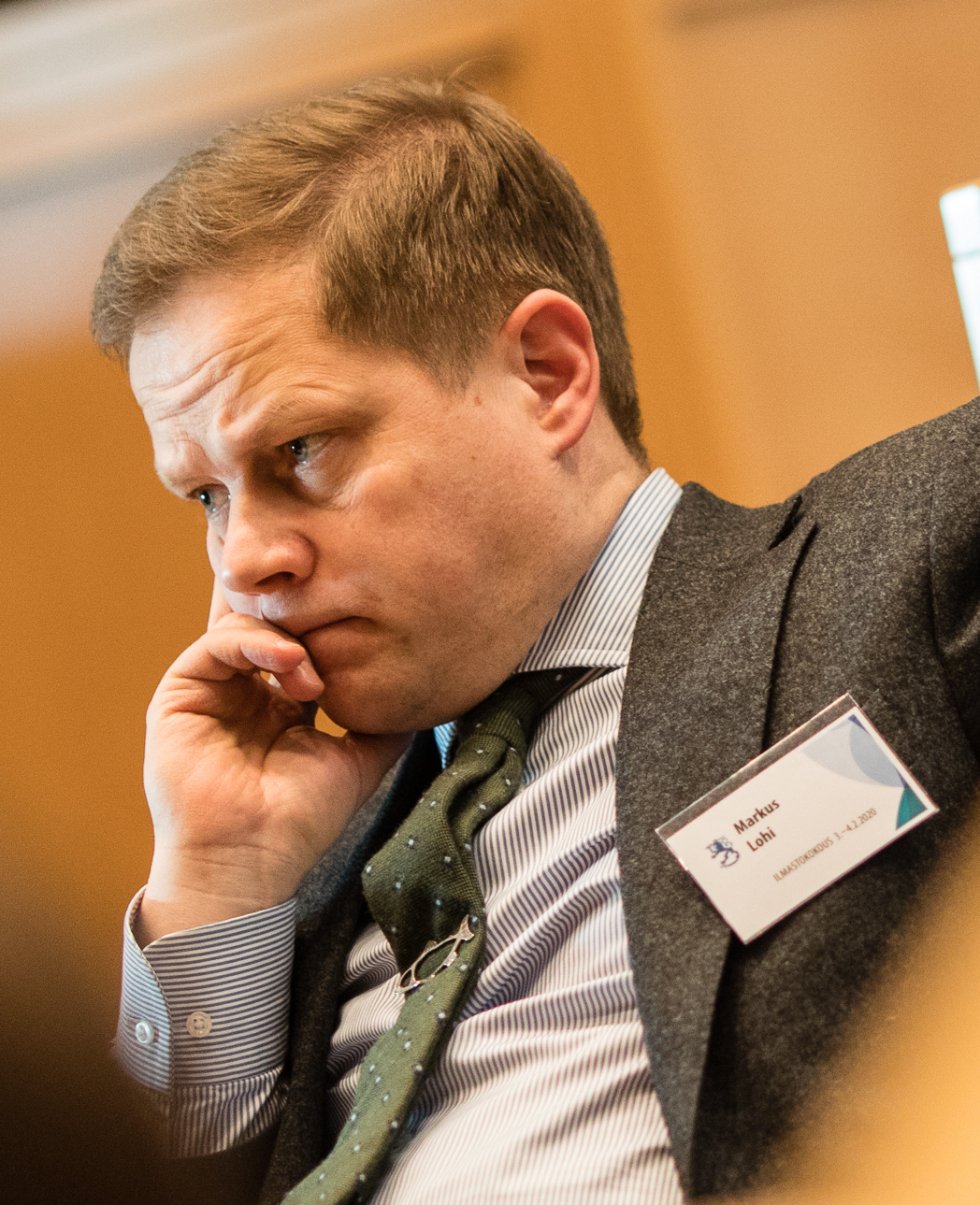
Markus Lohi, Deputy Chair of the Centre Party of Finland

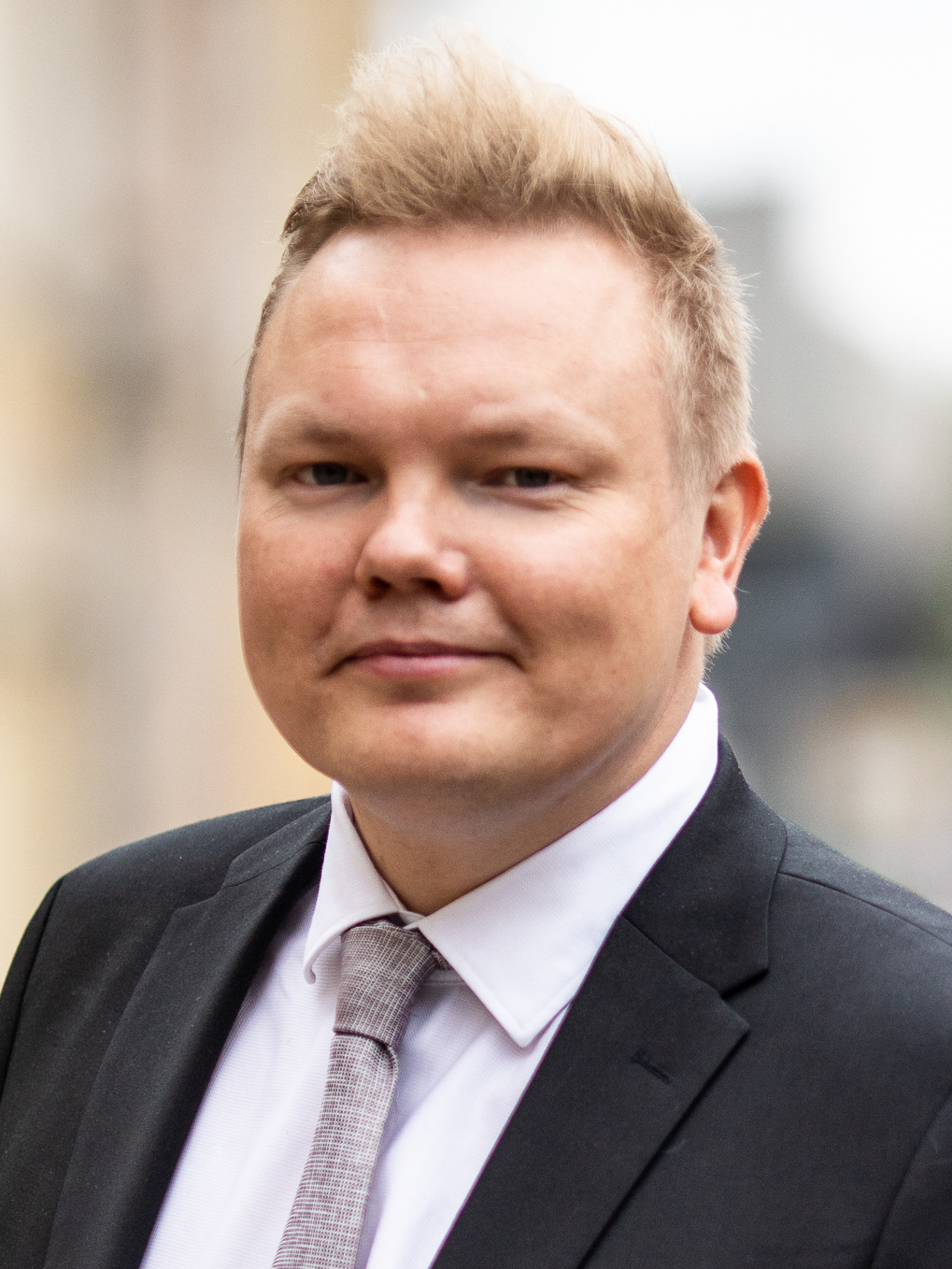
Antti Kurvinen, Chair of the Centre Party of Finland's Parliamentary Group

==== Chairperson ====
- Antti Kaikkonen (born 1974)

==== Deputy chairs ====
- Tuomas Kettunen (born 1988)
- Markus Lohi (born 1972)
- Hilkka Kemppi (born 1988)

==== Secretary-general ====
- Antti Siika-aho (born 1986)

==== Chair of the parliamentary group ====
- Antti Kurvinen (born 1986)

==== Deputy chairs of the parliamentary group ====
- Eeva Kalli (born 1981)
- Eerikki Viljanen (born 1975)

==== Other contemporary politicians ====
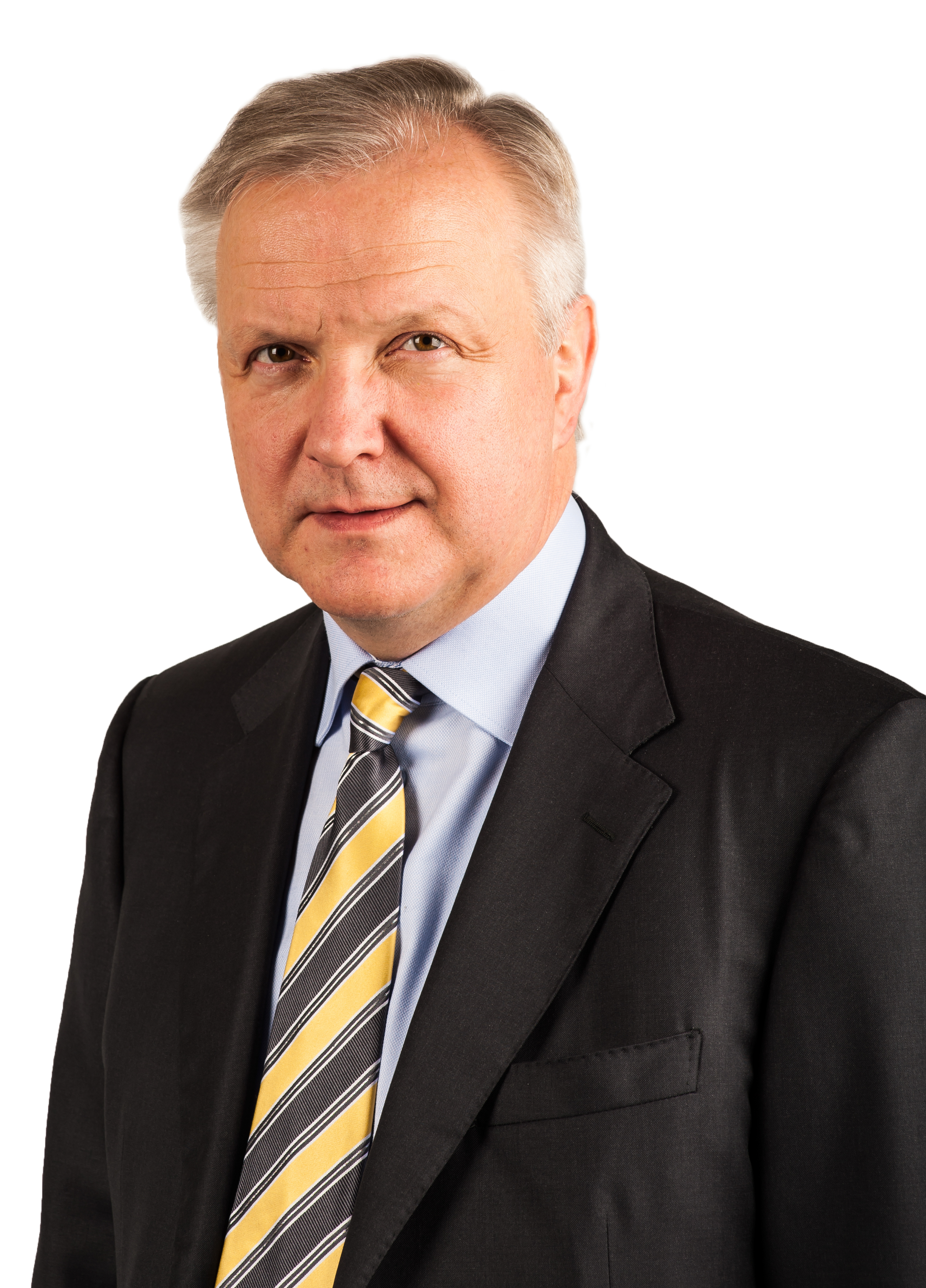
Olli Rehn, European Commissioner for Economic and Financial Affairs and the Euro, ex-Member of the European Parliament and Centre Party candidate in the 2024 Finnish presidential election

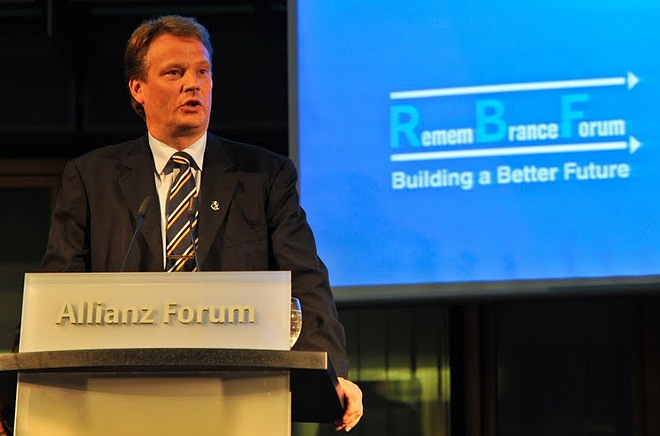
Hannu Takkula, former member of the European Parliament

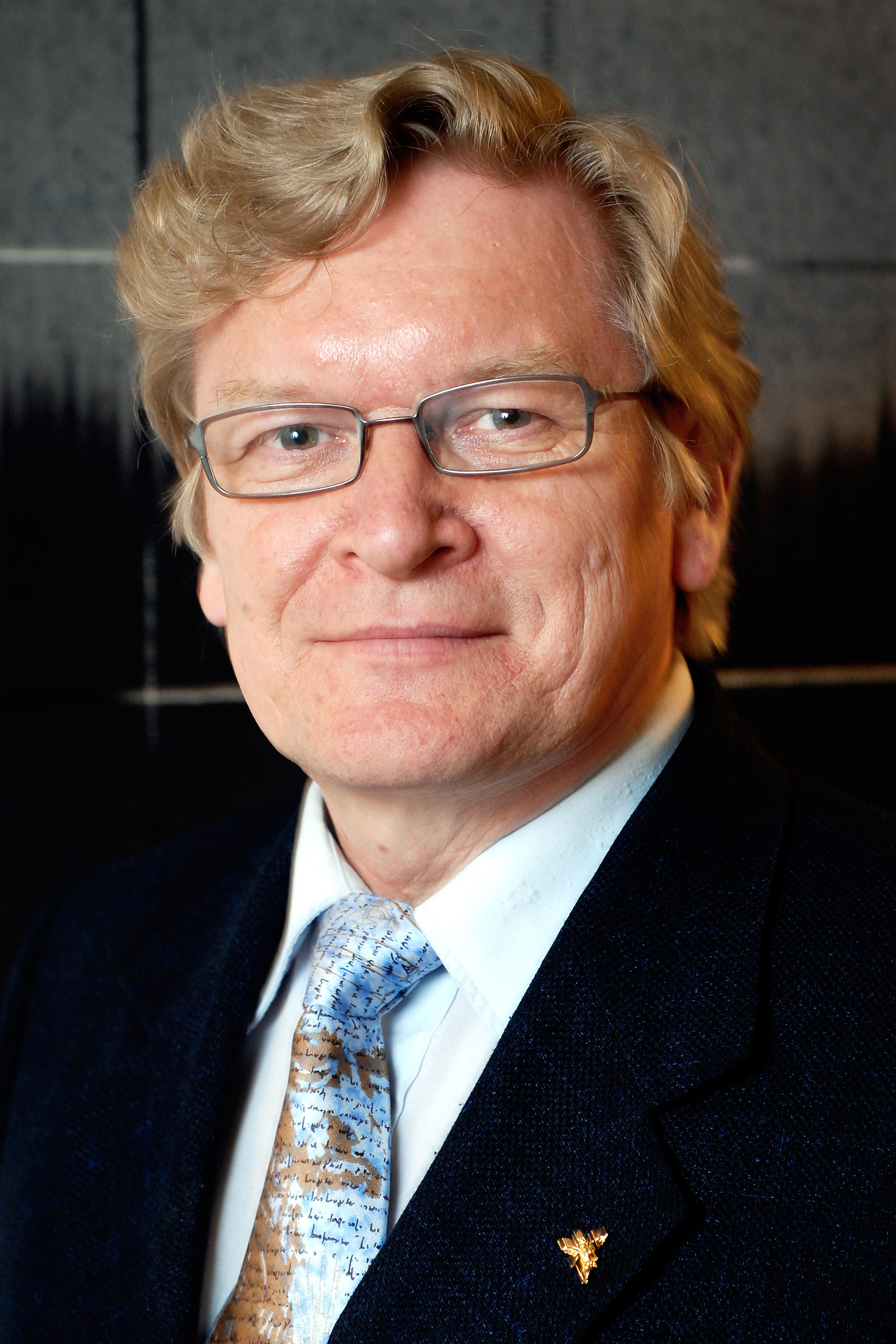
Simo Rundgren, former member of the Finnish Parliament

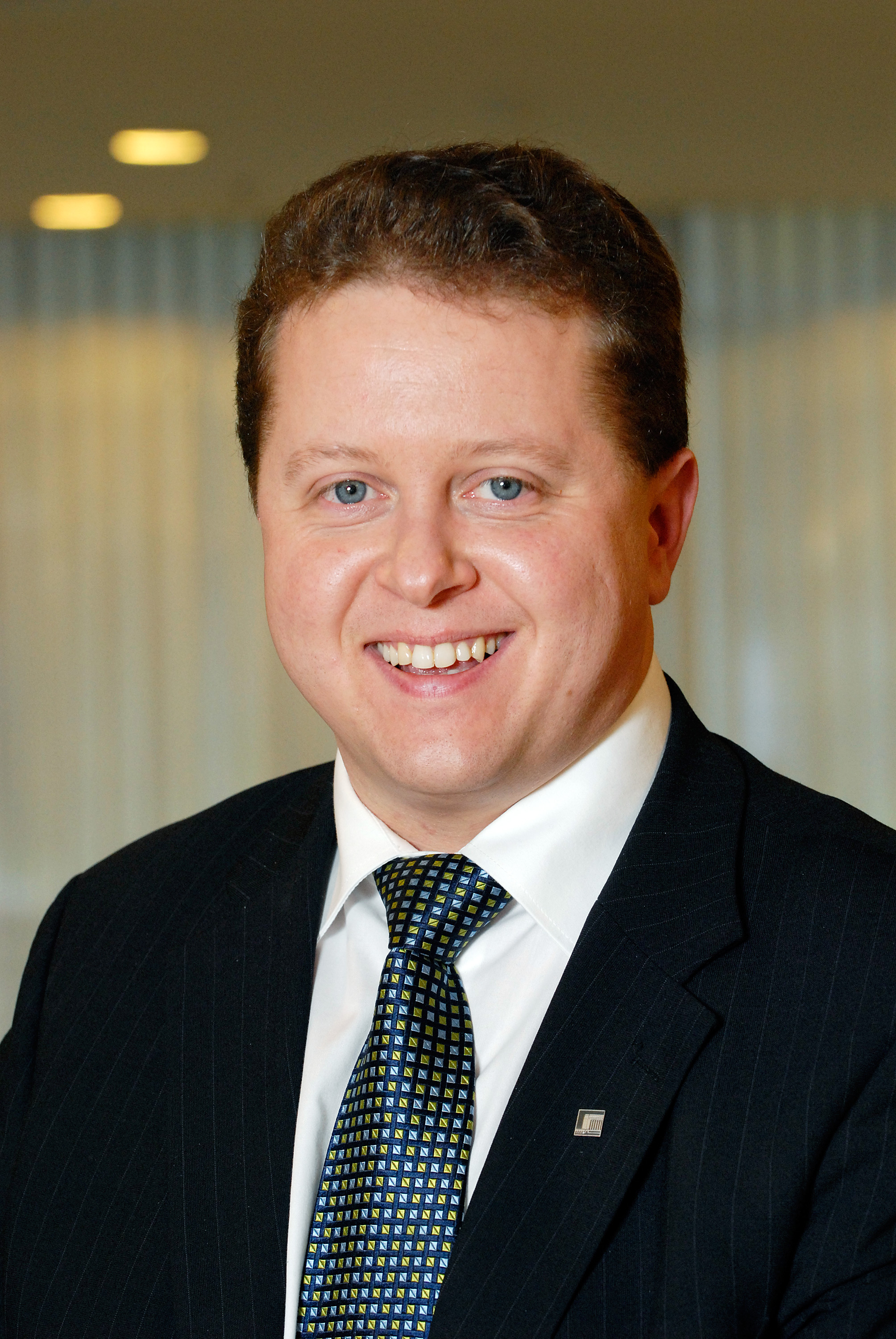
Janne Seurujärvi, first Sámi in the Finnish Parliament

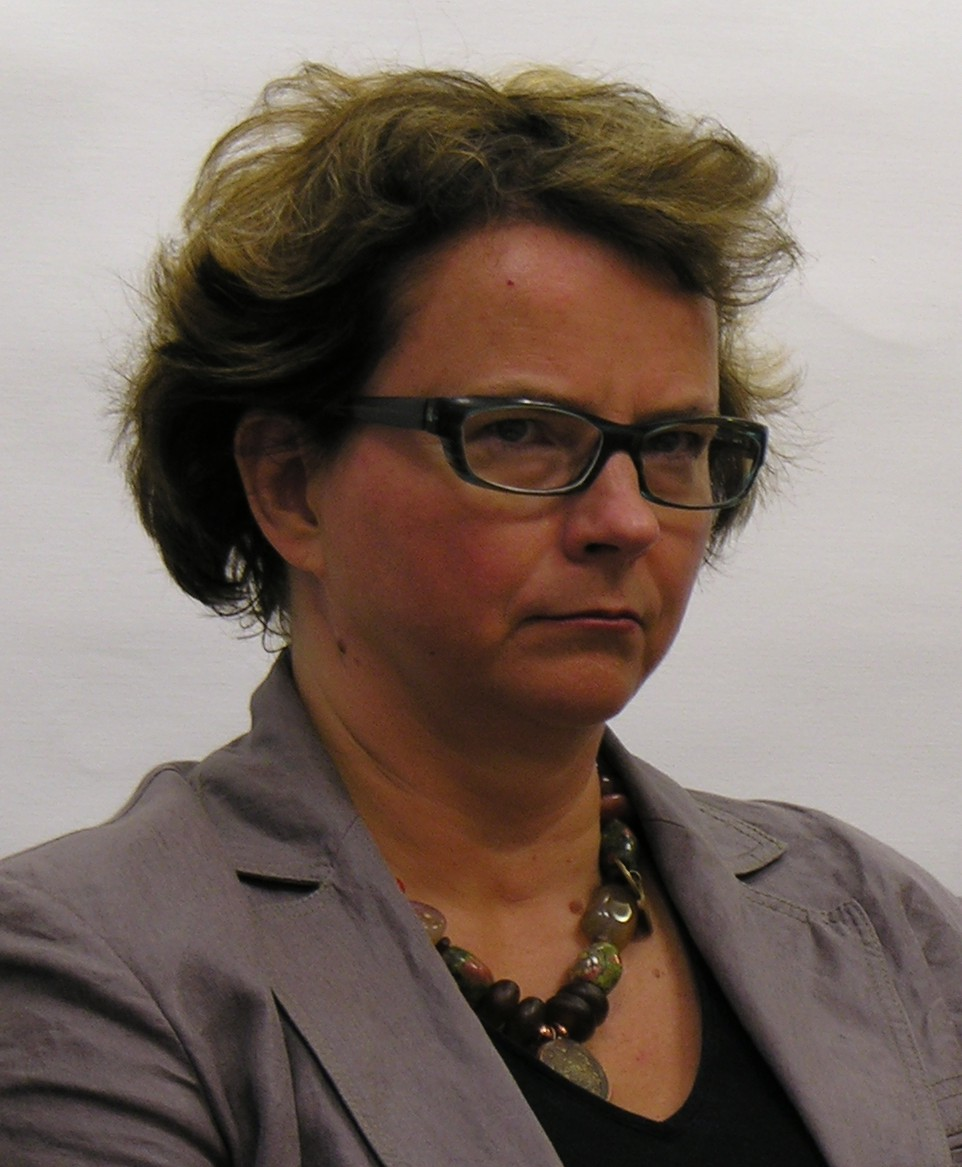
Laura Kolbe, Member of the Helsinki City Council

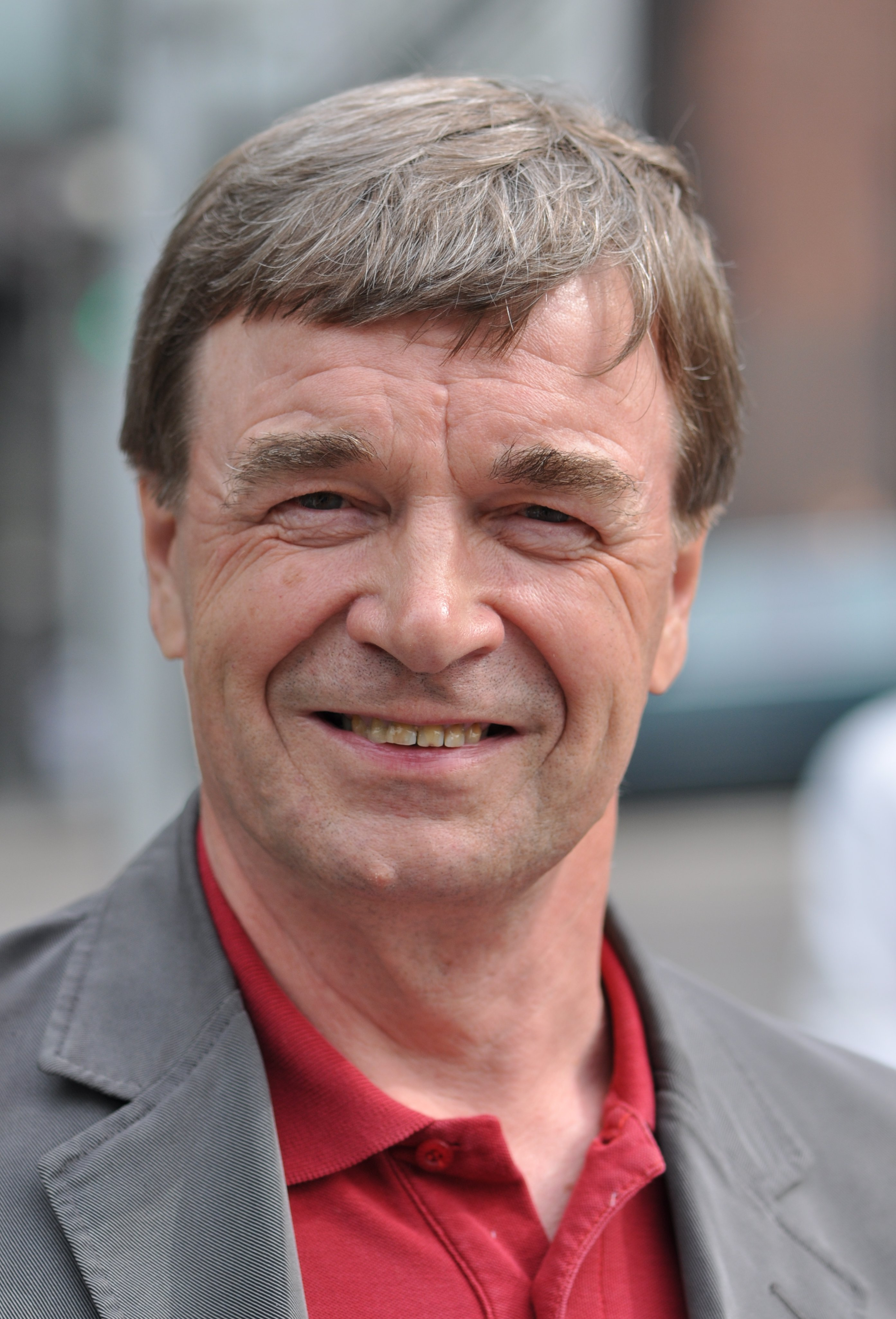
Timo Kalli, former member of the Finnish Parliament and ex-speaker of the Finnish Parliament

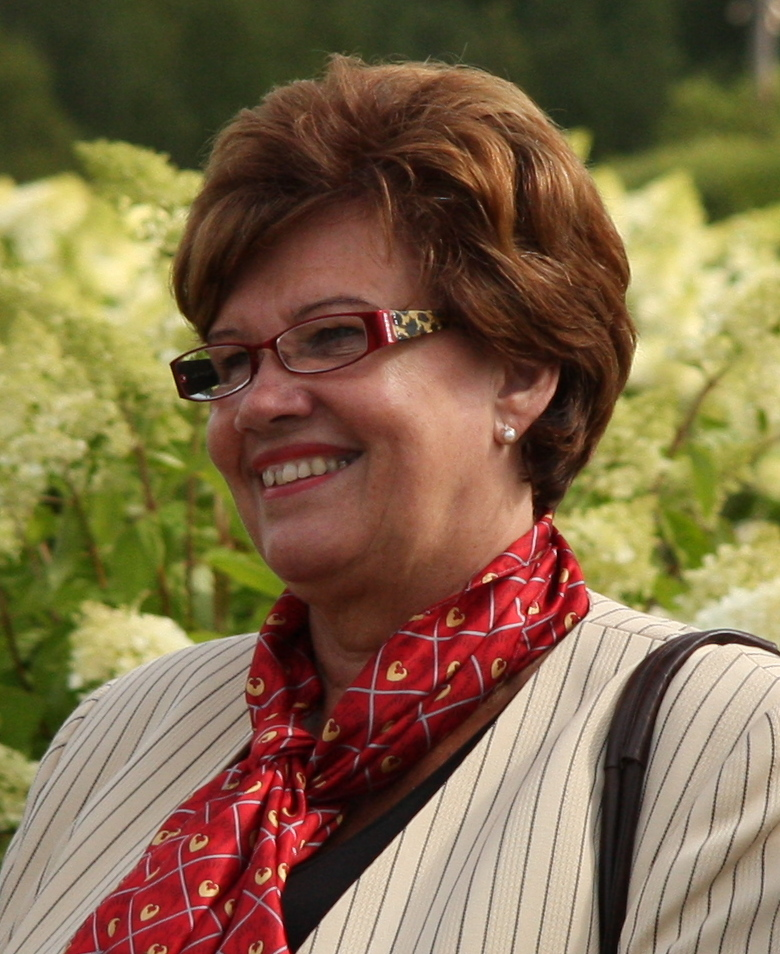
Sirkka-Liisa Anttila, former member of the Finnish Parliament and ex-Minister of Agriculture and Forestry

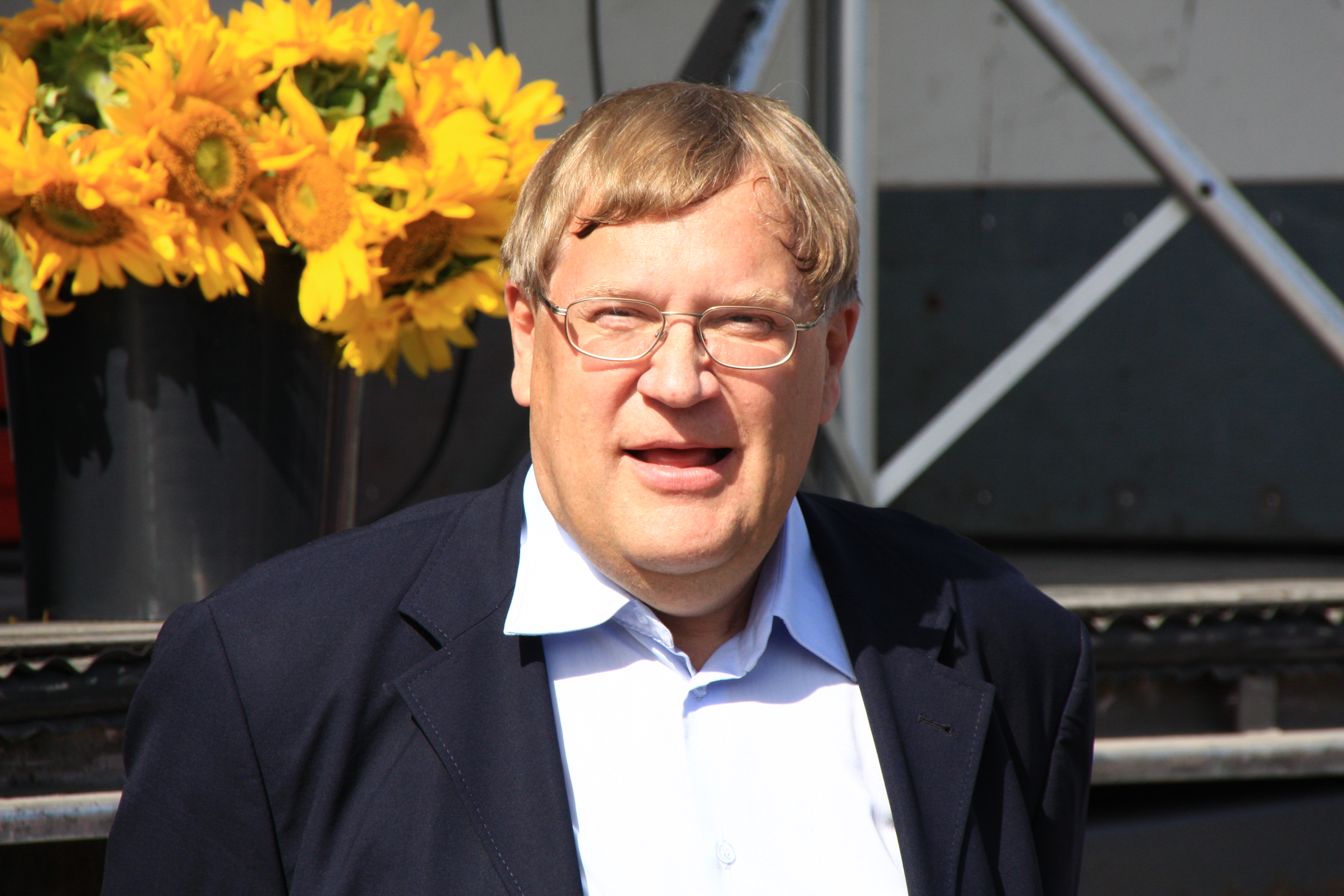
Esko Kiviranta, former member of the Finnish Parliament

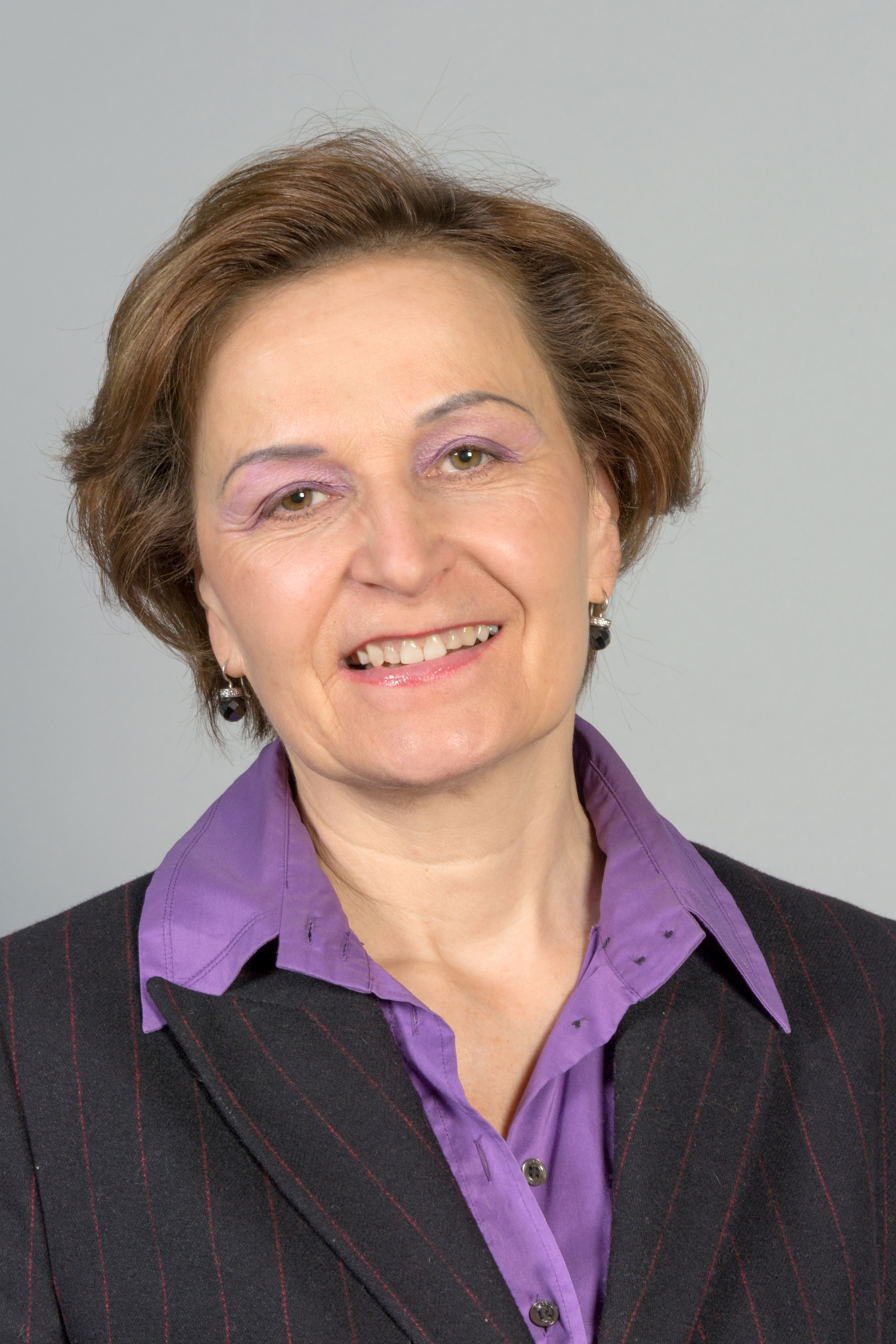
Anneli Jäätteenmäki, former member of the European Parliament and ex-prime minister of Finland

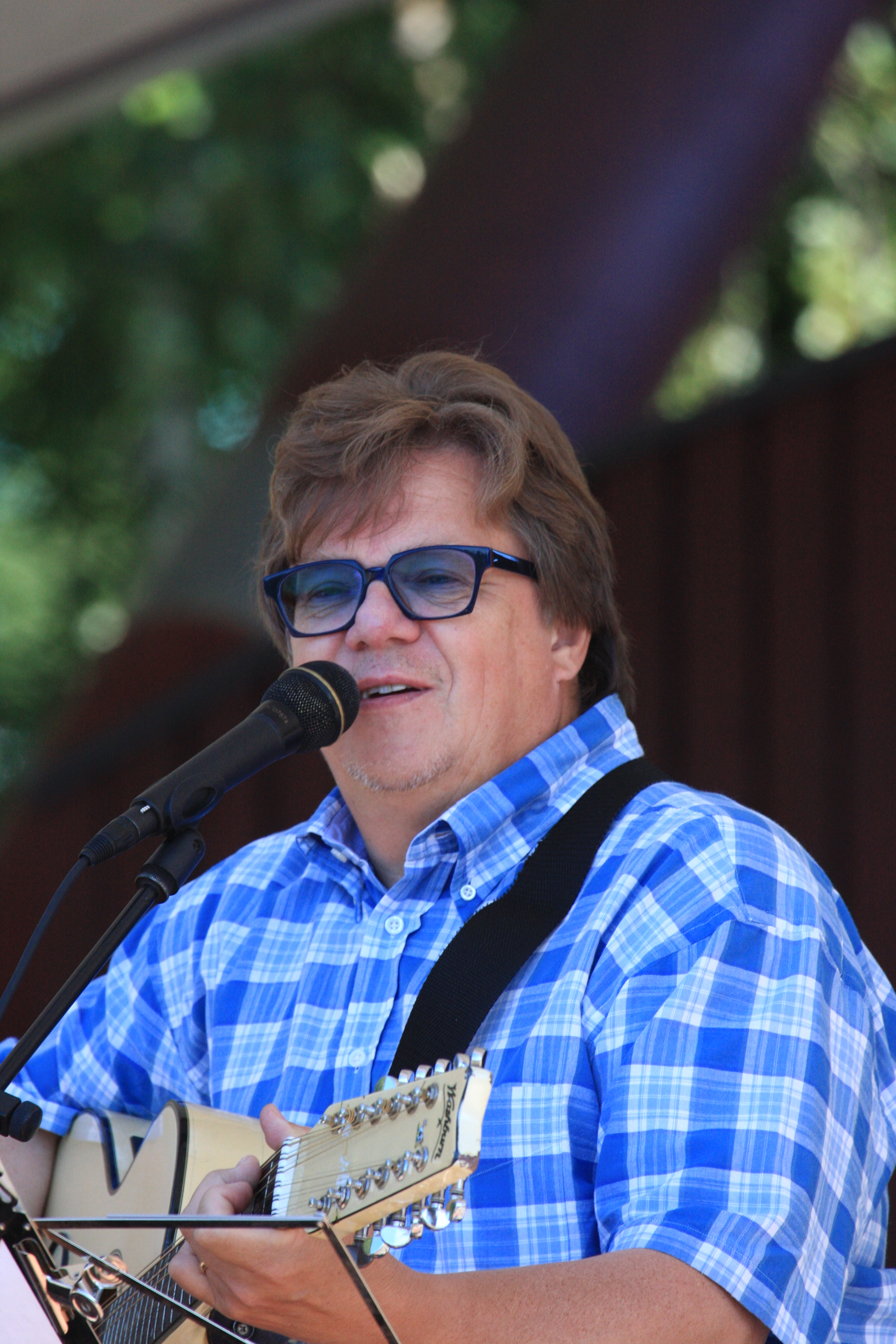
Mikko Alatalo, former member of the Finnish Parliament

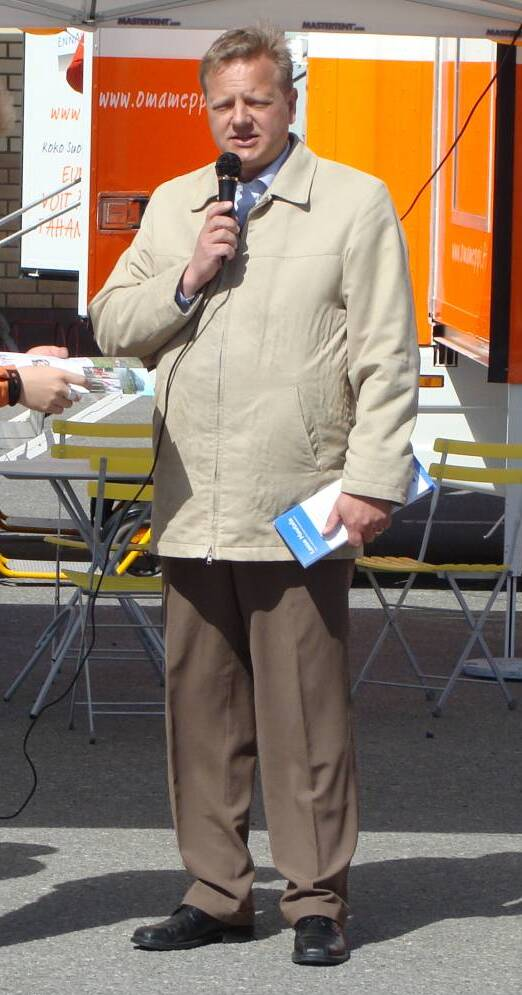
Lasse Hautala, former member of the Finnish Parliament

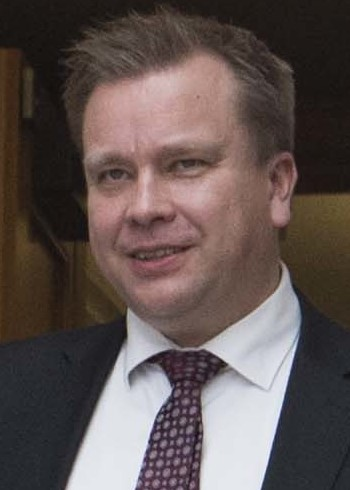
Antti Kaikkonen, former member of the Finnish Parliament and ex-minister of defence

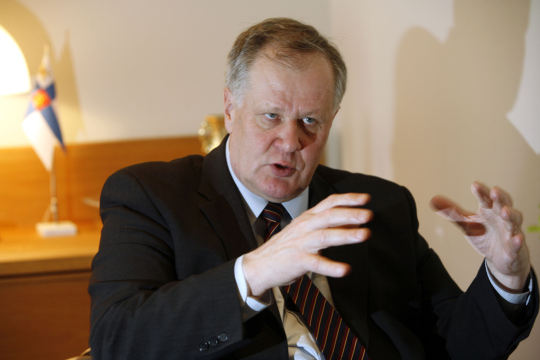
Seppo Kääriäinen, former member of the Finnish Parliament, ex-minister (many ministerial positions) and ex-speaker of the Finnish Parliament

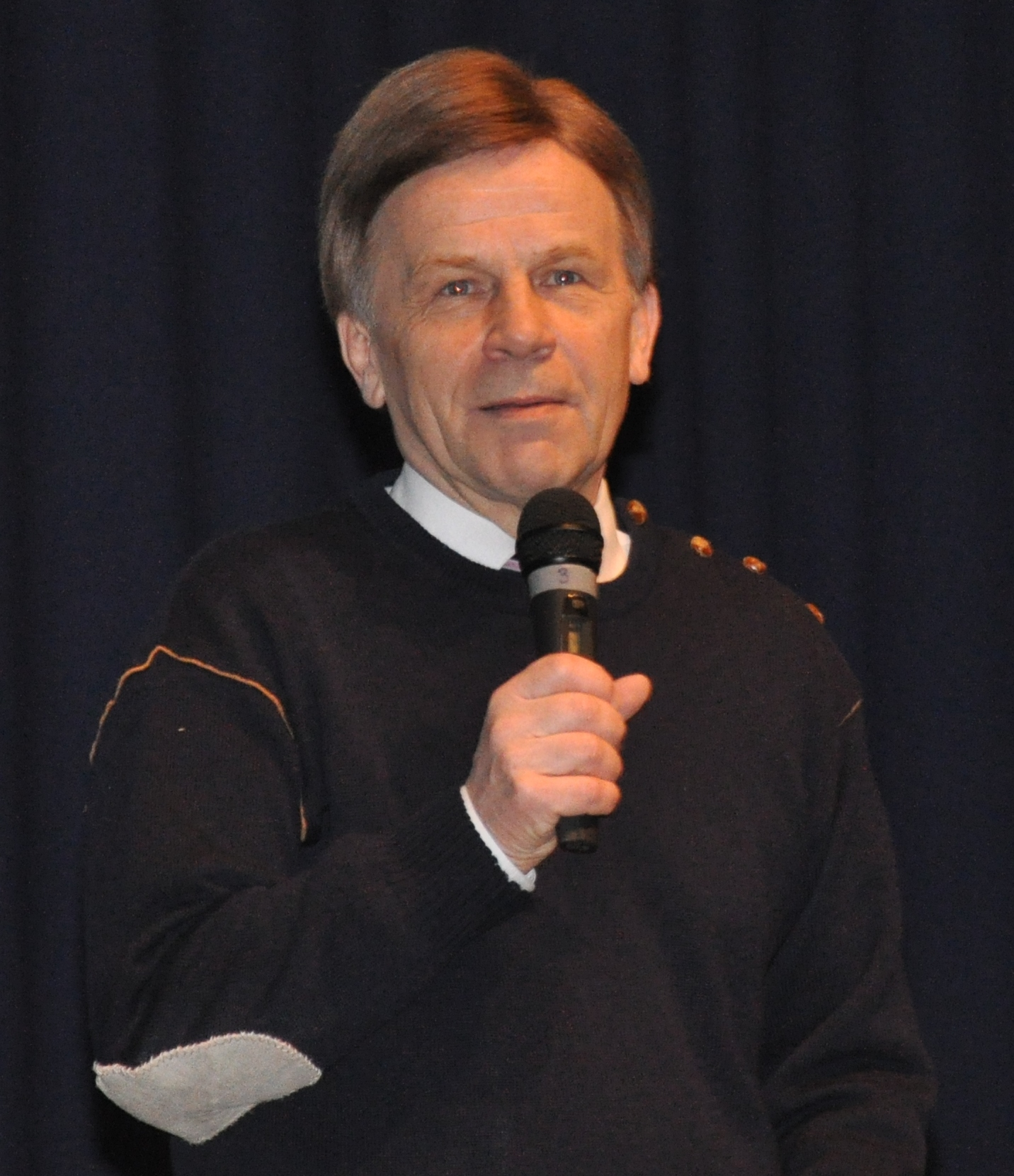
Mauri Pekkarinen, former member of the Finnish Parliament and ex-minister (many ministerial positions)

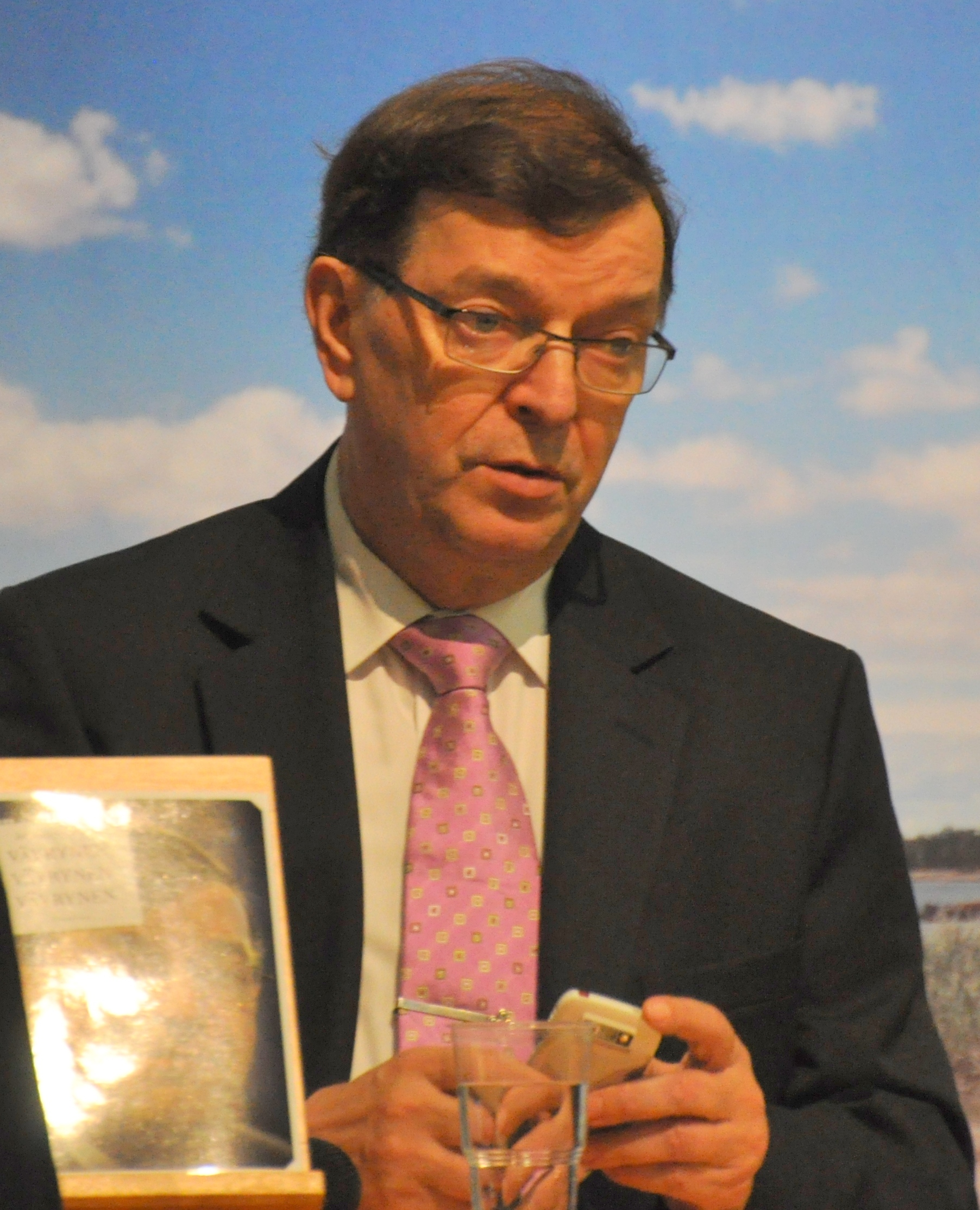
Paavo Väyrynen, three-time presidential candidate, honorary chair of the Centre Party and ex-minister (many ministerial positions)

== International representation ==
The party is a member of the Liberal International and the Alliance of Liberals and Democrats for Europe Party and subscribes to the liberal manifestos of these organisations. The Centre Party has been a full member of the Liberal International since 1988, having first joined as an observer member in 1983.

In the European Parliament, the Center Party sits in the Renew Europe group with two MEPs.

In the European Committee of the Regions, the Center Party sits in the Renew Europe CoR group with one full and two alternate members for the 2025-2030 mandate. Mirja Vehkapera is the third vice-president of the Renew Europe Group in the European Committee of the Regions.

== Prominent leaders ==
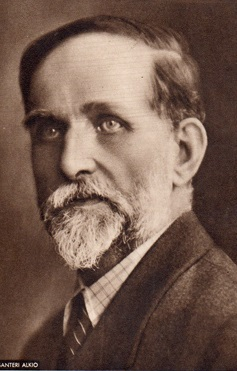
Santeri Alkio, political ideologist

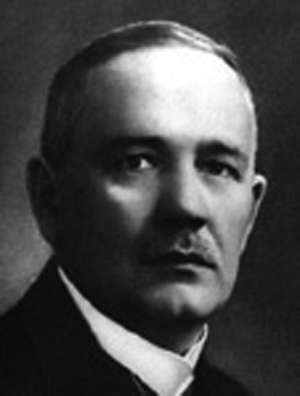
Lauri Kristian Relander, President (1925–1931)

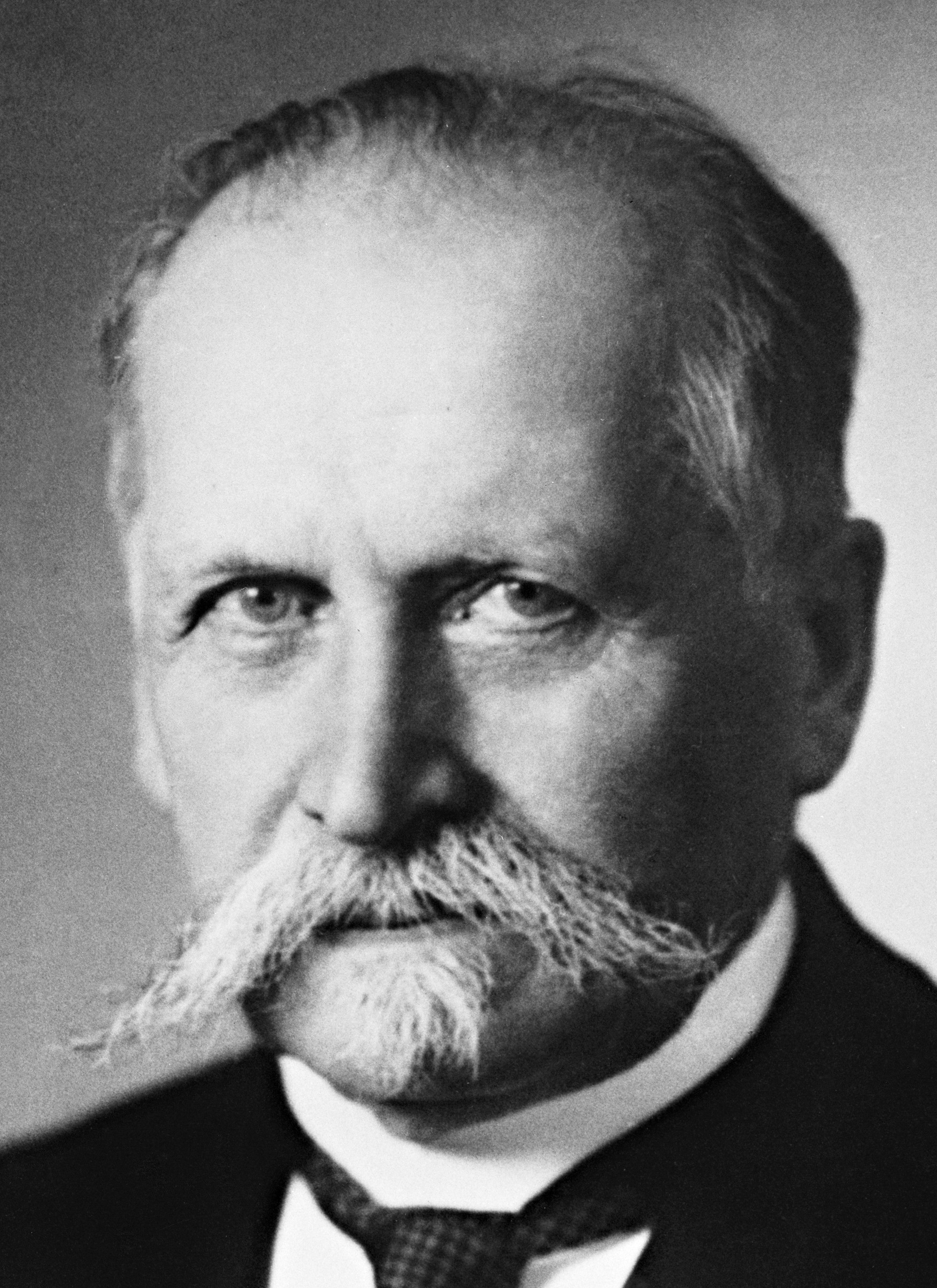
Kyösti Kallio, four-time Prime Minister (1922–1937) and President (1937–1940)

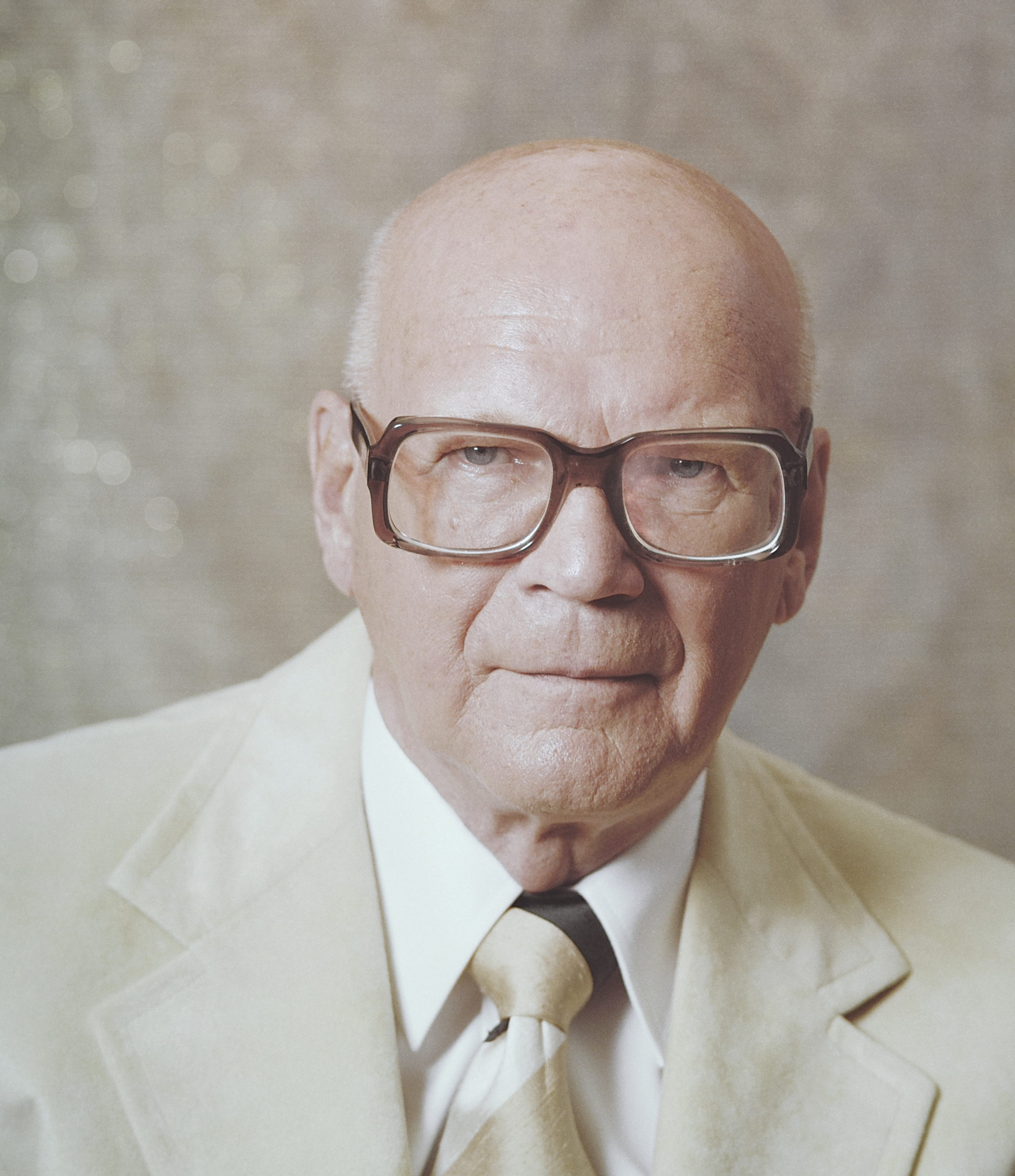
Urho Kekkonen, two-time Prime Minister (1950–1956) and President (1956–1981)

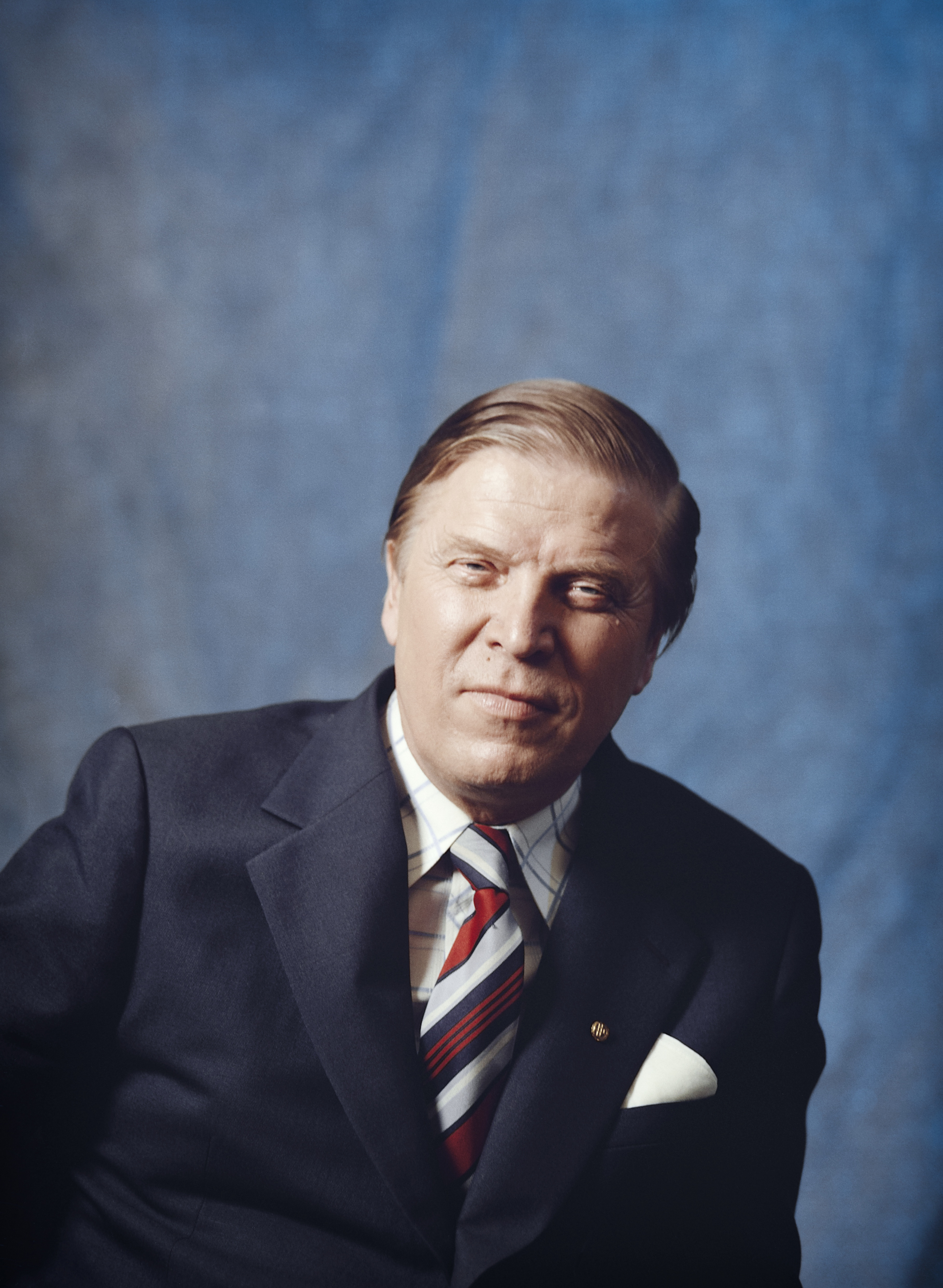
Johannes Virolainen, Prime Minister (1964–1966)

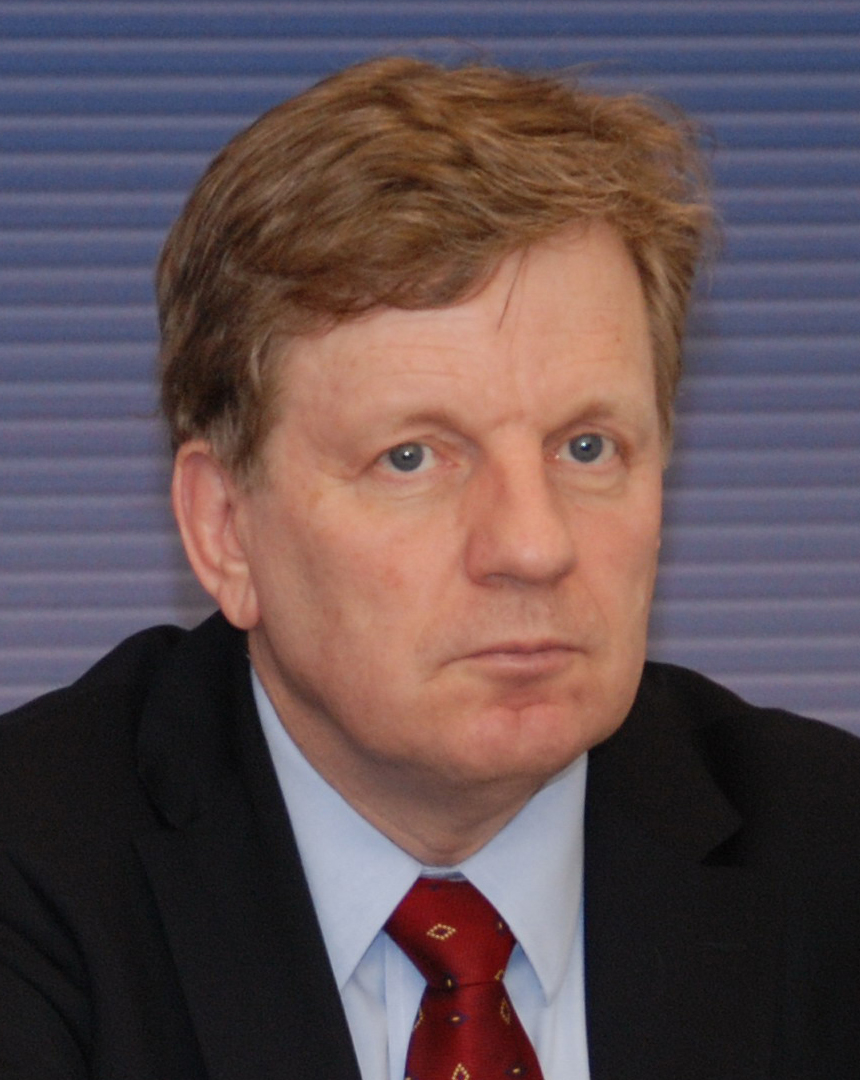
Esko Aho, Prime Minister of Finland (1991–1995) and executive vice president of Nokia (2008–2013)

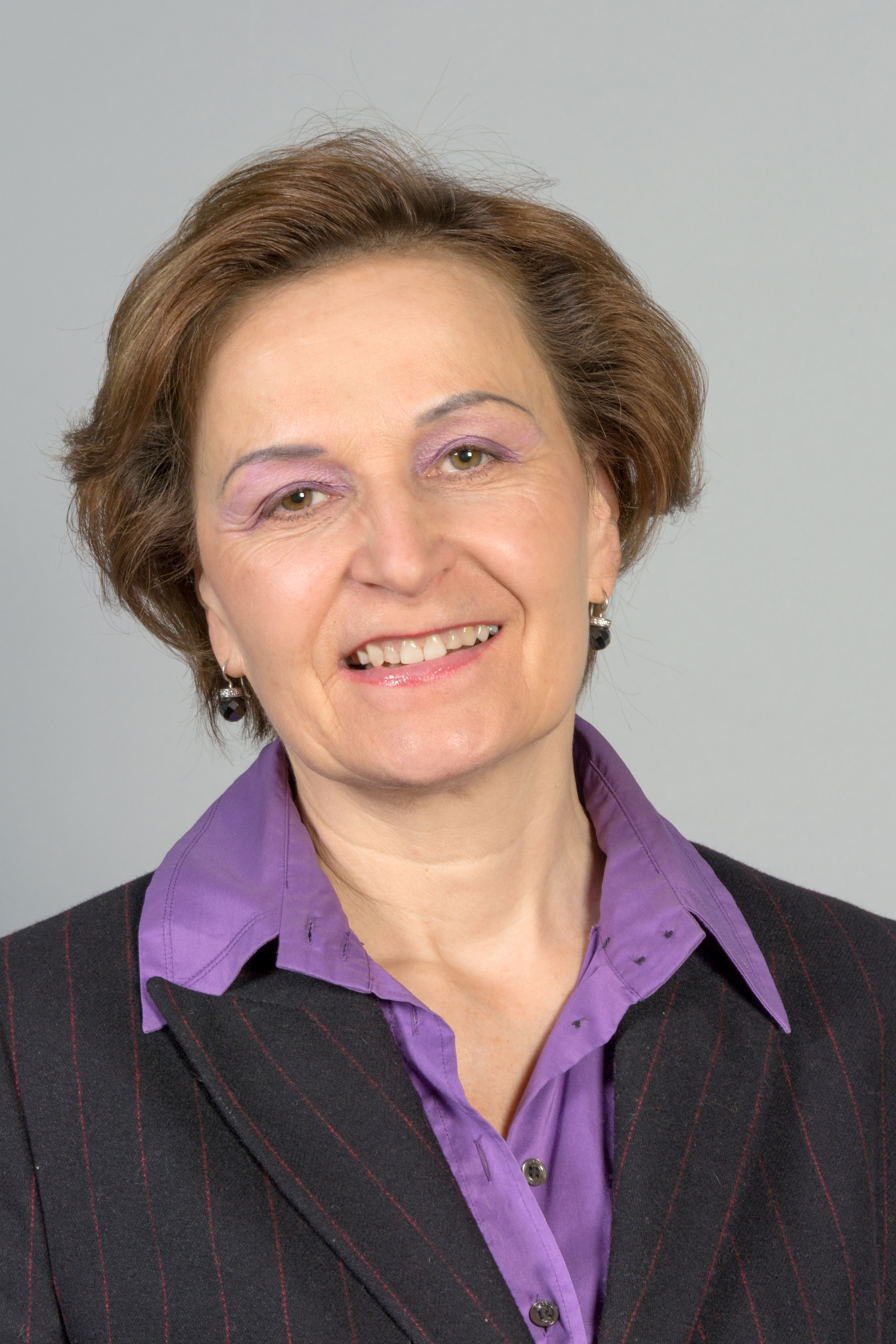
Anneli Jäätteenmäki, first female prime minister (2003)

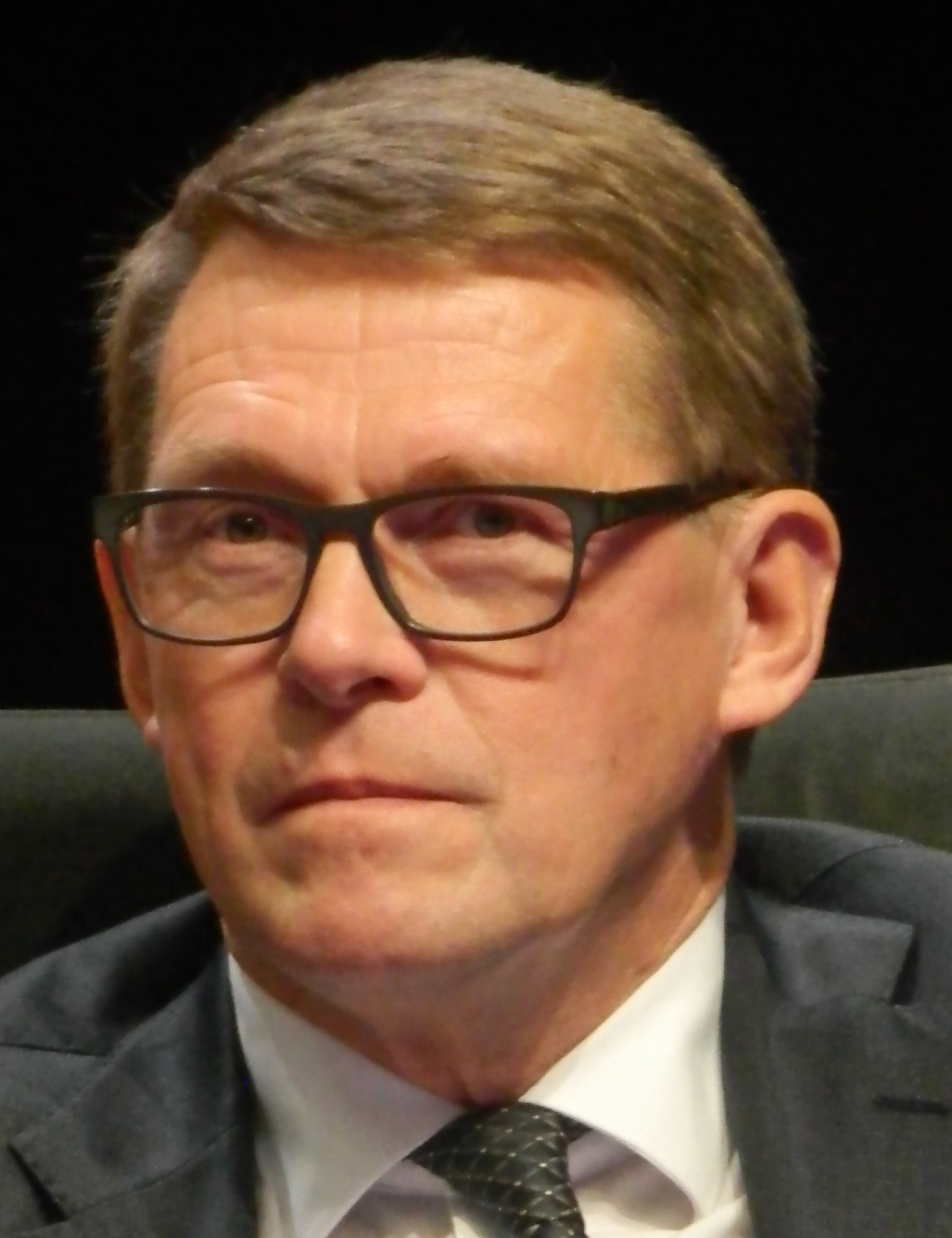
Matti Vanhanen, two-time prime minister (2003–2010)

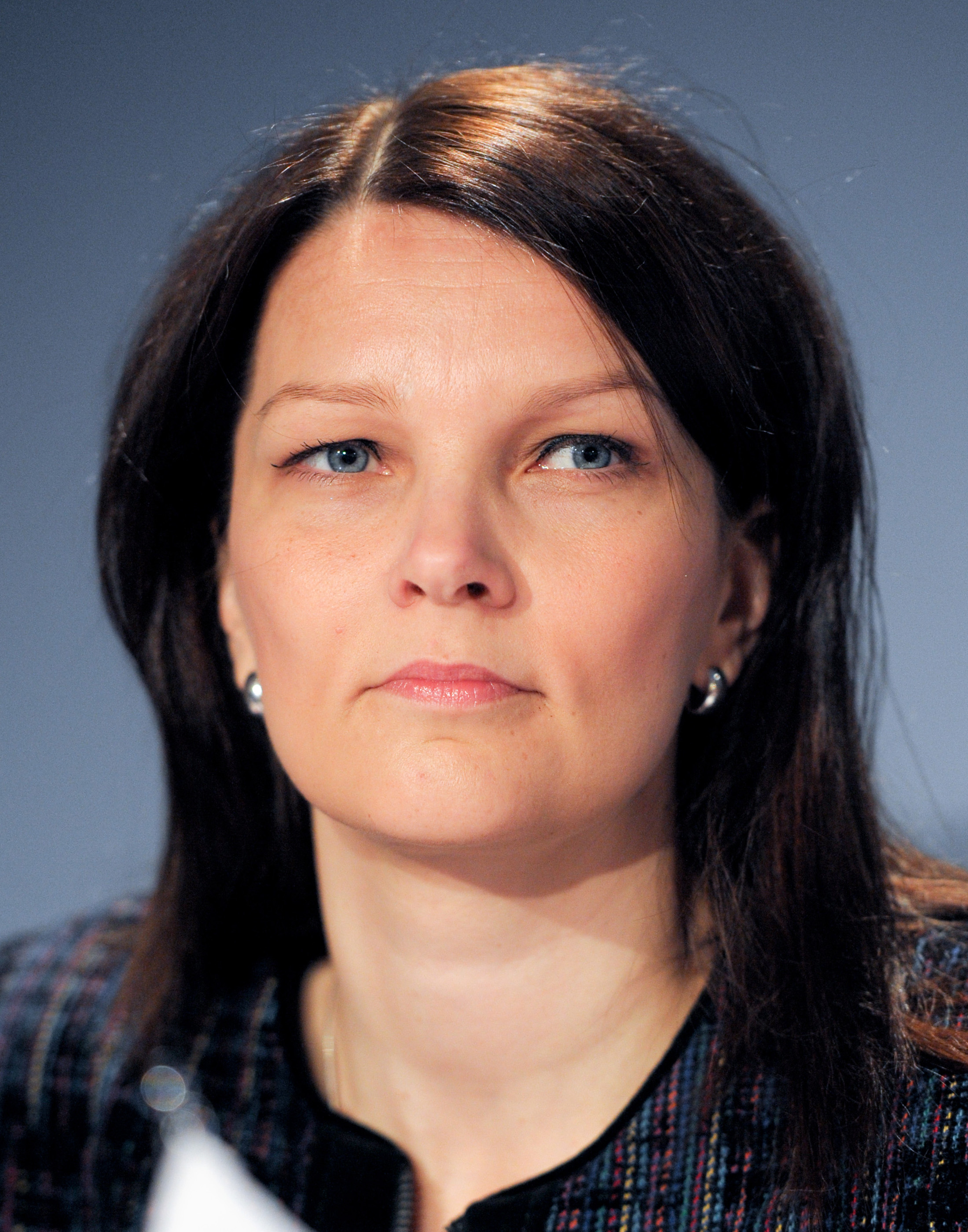
Mari Kiviniemi, Prime Minister (2010–2011)

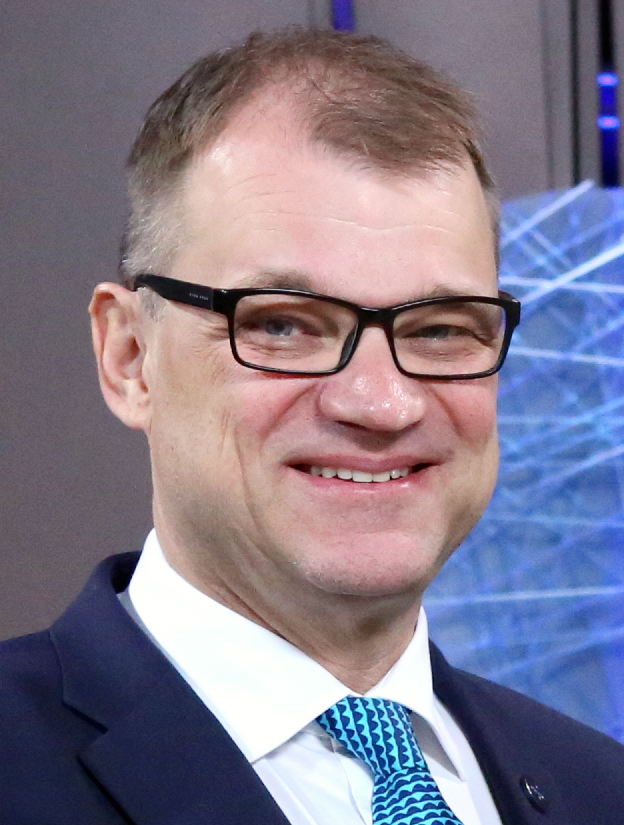
Juha Sipilä, Prime Minister (2015–March 2019)

== List of presidents ==
President	Term begin	Term end
Otto Karhi	1906	1909
Kyösti Kallio	1909	1917
Filip Saalasti	1917	1918
Santeri Alkio	1918	1919
Pekka Heikkinen	1919	1940
Viljami Kalliokoski	1940	1945
Vieno Johannes Sukselainen	1945	1964
Johannes Virolainen	1964	1980
Paavo Väyrynen	1980	1990
Esko Aho (first time)	1990	2000
Anneli Jäätteenmäki (first time)	2000	2001
Esko Aho (second time)	2001	2002
Anneli Jäätteenmäki (second time)	2002	2003
Matti Vanhanen	2003	2010
Mari Kiviniemi	2010	2012
Juha Sipilä	2012	2019
Katri Kulmuni	2019	2020
Annika Saarikko	2020	2024
Antti Kaikkonen	2024	Present

== Election results ==
=== Parliament of Finland ===
Support for the Centre Party by municipality in the 2011 parliamentary election in which the party has traditionally fared strongest in the northern part of the country.

Election	Votes	%	Seats	+/-	Government
1907	51,242	5.75	9 / 200	New	Opposition
1908	51,756	6.39	10 / 200	▲1	Opposition
1909	56,943	6.73	13 / 200	▲3	Opposition
1910	60,157	7.60	17 / 200	▲4	Opposition
1911	62,885	7.84	16 / 200	▼1	Opposition
1913	56,977	7.87	18 / 200	▲2	Opposition
1916	71,608	9.00	19 / 200	▲1	Opposition
1917	122,900	12.38	26 / 200	▲7	Coalition
1919	189,297	19.70	42 / 200	▲16	Coalition
1922	175,401	20.27	45 / 200	▲3	Coalition
1924	177,982	20.25	44 / 200	▼1	Coalition (1924–1925)
1924	177,982	20.25	44 / 200	▼1	Opposition (1926–1927)
1927	205,313	22.56	52 / 200	▲8	Coalition
1929	248,762	26.15	60 / 200	▲8	Coalition
1930	308,280	27.28	59 / 200	▼1	Coalition
1933	249,758	22.54	53 / 200	▼6	Coalition
1936	262,917	22.41	53 / 200	Steady	Coalition
1939	296,529	22.86	56 / 200	▲3	Coalition
1945	362,662	21.35	49 / 200	▼7	Coalition
1948	455,635	24.24	56 / 200	▲7	Opposition (1948–1950)
1948	455,635	24.24	56 / 200	▲7	Coalition (1950–1951)
1951	421,613	23.26	51 / 200	▼5	Coalition
1954	483,958	24.10	53 / 200	▲2	Coalition
1958	448,364	23.06	48 / 200	▼5	Coalition
1962	528,409	22.95	53 / 200	▲5	Coalition
1966	503,047	21.23	49 / 200	▼4	Coalition
1970	434,150	17.12	36 / 200	▼13	Coalition
1972	423,039	16.41	35 / 200	▼1	Opposition (1972)
1972	423,039	16.41	35 / 200	▼1	Coalition (1972–1975)
1975	484,772	17.63	39 / 200	▲4	Coalition
1979	500,478	17.29	36 / 200	▼3	Coalition
1983	525,207	17.63	38 / 200	▲2	Coalition
1987	507,460	17.62	40 / 200	▲2	Opposition
1991	676,717	24.83	55 / 200	▲15	Coalition
1995	552,003	19.85	44 / 200	▼11	Opposition
1999	600,592	22.40	48 / 200	▲4	Opposition
2003	689,391	24.69	55 / 200	▲7	Coalition
2007	640,428	23.11	51 / 200	▼4	Coalition
2011	463,160	15.82	35 / 200	▼16	Opposition
2015	626,218	21.10	49 / 200	▲14	Coalition
2019	423,920	13.76	31 / 200	▼18	Coalition
2023	349,362	11.30	23 / 200	▼8	Opposition

=== Municipal ===
Year	Councillors	Votes	
1950		121,804	8.09%
1953		282,331	16.04%
1956		366,380	21.91%
1960		401,346	20.44%
1964		413,561	19.28%
1968	3,533	428,841	18.93%
1972	3,297	449,908	17.99%
1976	3,936	494,423	18.43%
1980	3,889	513,362	18.72%
1984	4,052	545,034	20.21%
1988	4,227	554,924	21.10%
1992	3,998	511,954	19.22%
1996	4,459	518,305	21.81%
2000	4,625	528,319	23.75%
2004	4,425	543,885	22.77%
2008	3,518	512,220	20.09%
2012	3,077	465,167	18.66%
2017	2,824	450,529	17.53%
2021	2,445	363,364	14.9%
2025	2,623	396,630	16.4%

=== European Parliament ===
Election	Votes	%	Seats	+/-	EP Group
1996	548,041	24.36 (#1)	4 / 16	New	ELDR
1999	264,640	21.30 (#2)	4 / 16	0	ELDR
2004	387,217	23.37 (#2)	4 / 14	0	ALDE
2009	316,798	19.03 (#2)	3 / 13	▼1	ALDE
2014	339,398	19.67 (#2)	3 / 13	0	ALDE
2019	247,416	13.52 (#4)	2 / 13	▼1	RE
2024	215,165	11.76 (#4)	2 / 15	0	RE

=== Presidential elections ===
==== Indirect elections ====
Electoral college
Election	Candidate	Popular vote			First ballot		Second ballot		Third ballot		Results
Election	Candidate	Votes	%	Seats	Votes	%	Votes	%	Votes	%	Results
1919											
1925	Lauri Kristian Relander	123,923	19.9	69 / 300	69 / 300	23.0 (#2)	97 / 300	32.3 (#2)	172 / 300	57.3 (#1)	Won
1931	Kyösti Kallio	167,574	20.0	69 / 300	64 / 300	21.3 (#3)	53 / 300	17.7 (#3)			Lost
1937	Kyösti Kallio	184,668	16.6	56 / 300	56 / 300	18.7 (#3)	177 / 300	59.0 (#1)			Won
1940											
1943	Arvo Manner				1 / 300	0.3 (#5)					
1946											
1950	Urho Kekkonen	338,035	21.4	67 / 300	62 / 300	20.7 (#3)					Lost
1956	Urho Kekkonen	510,783	26.9	88 / 300	88 / 300	29.3 (#1)	102 / 300	34.0 (#2)	151 / 300	50.3 (#1)	Won
1962	Urho Kekkonen	698,199	31.7	111 / 300	199 / 300	66.3 (#1)					Won
1968	Urho Kekkonen	421,197	20.7	65 / 300	201 / 300	67.0 (#1)					Won
1978	Urho Kekkonen	475,372	19.4	64 / 300	259 / 300	86.3 (#1)					Won
1982	Johannes Virolainen	534,515	16.8	53 / 300	53 / 300	17.7 (#3)	53 / 300	17.7 (#3)			Lost
1988 (Note: The 1988 presidential election was partially indirect. With no candidate achieving a majority of the popular vote, the president was elected by the electoral college which the voters voted for alongside the direct vote.)	Paavo Väyrynen	647,769	21.7	68 / 300	68 / 300	22.7 (#2)	68 / 300	22.7 (#2)			Lost

==== Direct elections ====
Election	Candidate	1st round		2nd round		Result
Election	Candidate	Votes	%	Votes	%	Result
1988	Paavo Väyrynen	636,375	20.6	—N/a		Lost
1994	Paavo Väyrynen	623,415	19.5			Lost
2000	Esko Aho	1,051,159	34.4	1,540,803	48.4	Lost
2006	Matti Vanhanen	561,990	18.6			Lost
2012	Paavo Väyrynen	536,731	17.5			Lost
2018	Matti Vanhanen	122,383	4.1			Lost
2024	Olli Rehn (Note: Formally ran as independent.)	496,518	15.3			Lost

== See also ==
- Liberalism and centrism in Finland
- Nordic agrarian parties

== Sources ==
- Vares, Vesa; Mikko Uola; Mikko Majander (2006). Demokratian haasteet 1907–1919, article in the book Kansanvalta koetuksella. Helsinki: Edita. ISBN 9513745430.
- Vares, Vesa (1998). Kuninkaan tekijät: Suomalainen monarkia 1917–1919. Myytti ja todellisuus. Porvoo-Helsinki-Juva: WSOY. ISBN 9510232289.
