= Union of Liberal Students =

- Founded: 1920
- Dissolved: 1993
- Merged into: Liberal Democrat Youth and Students
- Headquarters: Offices at the National Liberal Club, 1 Whitehall Place, London
- Ideology: Liberalism (British); Radicalism; Community politics Social liberalism
- Mother party: Liberal Party
- International affiliation: International Federation of Liberal and Radical Youth (IFLRY)
- European affiliation: European Liberal Youth (LYMEC)

The Union of Liberal Students (ULS) was the English and Welsh student wing of the United Kingdom's Liberal Party. The Scottish Liberal Party had a separate organisation, Scottish Liberal Students.

ULS was founded in 1920 as the Union of University Liberal Societies and merged with the student wing of the UK Social Democratic Party when the parent parties merged. Together with the party's youth wing, the National League of Young Liberals (NLYL or Young Liberals), the organisations made up the Young Liberal Movement. In 1990, the two organisations themselves merged to form Liberal Democrat Youth and Students (LDYS). In Spring 2008, it was renamed Liberal Youth, and in December 2016 as Young Liberals.

ULS was a member of both IFLRY and LYMEC.

== List of national chairs of the Union of Liberal Students ==
- Paul Farthing (1988-89)
- Alun Evans (1987–88)
- Sheila Cunliffe (1986–87)
- Harriet Steele (1985–86)
- Andrew Lawson/Martin Horwood (1984–85)
- Andrew Lawson (1983–84)
- Elizabeth (Liz) Barker (1982–83)
- Jane Merritt (1980–82)
- David Hughes (1976–77)
- Tony Greaves (1960s)
- Trevor Smith (1950s)
- Roger Roberts (1956–57)
- Richard Gillachrist Moore (1954–55)
- Derick Mirfin (1952–53)
- Glyn Tegai Hughes
- John Beeching Frankenburg (1940s)
- Archibald Pellow Marshall (1924–25)
- Alec Beechman (1922)

== Participation in the National Union of Students and alliances in NUS ==
In 1966 Liberal, Communist and independent students formed the Radical Students Alliance with the intention of introducing a more active, grass-roots approach to student politics. In 1969 Jack Straw was elected to the National Union of Students (NUS) executive as a Radical Students Alliance candidate. The RSA was dominant in student politics until 1971 when the Broad Left (an alliance of Communists and Labour Students) came to prominence.

During the 1970s ULS had little success in NUS National Executive elections with Francis Hayden (1975), Gavin Grant (1978) and Leighton Andrews (1979) being the only electoral successes as part-time Executive members.

In 1979 ULS was one of the founders of the Left Alliance along with Communist, independent Labour (not in the National Organisation of Labour Students) and independent members. 1980-82 was a period of Left Alliance leadership of NUS with David Aaronovitch as President of NUS and Jane Taylor as National Secretary.

In 1982 John Murray was elected as a part-time Liberal/LA member of the NUS Executive along with Frank Howard (Labour/LA) and Kate Steele (Communist/LA). John later went on to be National Treasurer of NUS.
