= Ógra Fianna Fáil =

Youth wing of the Irish political party, Fianna Fáil

- President: John Crowley
- Founded: 1975
- Headquarters: 65–66 Lower Mount Street, Dublin 2, Ireland
- Mother party: Fianna Fáil
- European affiliation: European Liberal Youth
- Website: Ógra Fianna Fáil

Ógra Fianna Fáil (Note: In the Irish language, the initial letter of a proper noun in the genitive, as in [Youth of] Fianna Fáil, is lenited, and therefore the grammatically correct spelling is Ógra Fhianna Fáil, with a silent "fh".) (Irish: [ˈoːɡɾˠə ˌfʲiən̪ˠə ˈfˠaːlʲ]; meaning "Youth of Fianna Fáil") is the youth wing of Fianna Fáil.

The organisation was founded in 1975 by party leader Jack Lynch under the guidance of party general secretary, Séamus Brennan. It is active on an all-Ireland basis, with branches in major third level institutes (called cumainn) and parliamentary constituencies (called Comhairle Dáil Cheantair) in the Republic of Ireland. In Northern Ireland it is organised on a Council District basis, along with third level branches at the University of Ulster and Queen's University Belfast. In October 2014 Ógra became an official full member organisation of European Liberal Youth at their annual congress in Berlin.

== President ==
From the inception of the organisation until 2011 Ógra was chaired by the a member of the Fianna Fáil parliamentary party which included Bertie Ahern, Seán Haughey, Barry Andrews and Dara Calleary. Since 2011 Ógra have elected a president of the organisation. The first president of Ógra was Eamon Quinlan, who later became mayor of Waterford City in 2015.

In 2013 Blackrock's Kate Feeney was elected as the first female leader of Ógra. She is a daughter of former senator Geraldine Feeney and was elected to Dún Laoghaire-Rathdown County Council while president of Ógra in 2014.

Eoin Neylon won the election for president of Ógra for two terms (2014 - 2015).

James Doyle of Dublin Fingal was elected to the office in November 2016, serving one term. Dún Laoghaire's Ian Woods was elected to the role in March 2018.

Lawrencetown native Tom Cahill was elected as President (Uachtarán) in November 2019. He was replaced by Bryan Mallon in March 2021. On 20 December 2021 a motion to remove Mallon as president received 62% of support from members, but failed to reach the required 66.7% for it to pass, and so he was not removed from office.

== Organisation ==
Ógra Fianna Fáil is organised across all the 32 counties of Ireland, maintaining a presence in most local communities and Third Level institutes. Within Ógra Fianna Fáil there four different types of units that can be formed: Ógra Comhairle Dáil Ceantair (CDC) in the Republic of Ireland, Council District Constituency (CDC) in Northern Ireland, Ógra Comhairle Ceantair (CC), Ógra Third Level Cumann, and Ógra Coiste Áitiúil. The three governing bodies of Ógra Fianna Fáil are the National Youth Conference, Ógra Central Officer Board and Ógra National Council.

- Ógra Comhairle Dáil Ceantair (Ógra CDC) – The Ógra CDC covers the area of the Dáil constituency as set out by the Constituencies Commission, or in some cases where a constituency crosses a County border; it covers the area of that County.
- Ógra Council District Constituency (CDC) - The Ógra CDC covers the area of the Local government in Northern Ireland. They have the same status as Comhairle Dáil Ceantair within the organisation.
- Ógra Comhairle Ceantair (Ógra CC) – This type of unit is smaller than an Ógra CDC, it only includes the Ógra members who are in a particular part of the constituency, most likely a local electoral area (LEA). Ógra CC members may also be members of a Third Level Cumann and an Ógra CDC.
- Ógra Third Level Cumann – Most higher education institutions have an Ógra Fianna Fáil Cumann. These branches generally have similar status to an Ógra CDC.
- Ógra Coiste Áitiúil – Ógra members in a particular local area are encouraged to form local units to allow the local members to come together to discuss issues and to organise events to promote Fianna Fáil. This form of Ógra unit was instigated to support the organisation in places where may not be practical or possible for Ógra members to travel long distances to Ógra CC or CDC meetings, or not possible to establish an Ógra CC.
- Ógra National Youth Conference (NYC) – The National Youth Conference is the supreme decision-making body of Ógra. The conference takes place every 12–18 months with the venue being decided by interested units presenting their bids to the delegates at National Council. The location for the NYC is rotated between each of the regions: Connacht, Leinster, Dublin, Ulster and Munster. All votes for policy motions and COB positions are carried out via One Member One Vote (OMOV).
- Ógra Central Officer Board (COB) – The Central Officer Board is responsible for the management of Ógra. It consists of a President, Policy Director, Campaigns and Events Director, Membership and Recruitment Director, International Officer, Irish and Cultural Officer, Equality & Educational Officer, five Regional Organisers, Press Officer(s) and the National Youth Officer.
- Ógra National Council (NC) – The National Council provides oversight to the work of the Central Officer Board. Meetings are usually held every 8–12 weeks. All members of the organisation are entitled to attend meetings. Unlike the NYC, National Council functions under a delegate system where every registered Ógra CDC and Third Level Cumann is entitled to send 3 delegates (at least 1 man and 1 woman) to National Council to vote on behalf of their CDC or cumann. These delegates can hold the COB to account, debate policy and submit and vote on motions.

== Third level branches ==
=== Kevin Barry Cumann – University College Dublin ===
The Kevin Barry Cumann is the branch in University College Dublin (UCD). The cumann predates the founding of Ógra Fianna Fáil which was established in 1956. It formally dates to 1957 when led by Gerry Collins, then a student organiser in UCD and later Minister for Foreign Affairs. It is named after UCD student and Irish revolutionary Kevin Barry.

Former members include former European Commissioner Charlie McCreevy, previous ministers Dick Roche and Mary Coughlan, Donegal TD Charlie McConalogue and RTÉ presenter Ryan Tubridy. The author and former political lobbyist Frank Dunlop was also a member.

Malcolm Byrne is a former secretary of the Kevin Barry Cumann.

=== Pádraig Pearse Cumann – Dublin City University ===
The Dublin City University branch is the Pádraig Pearse Cumann, commonly known as The PPC. At the Fianna Fáil National Youth Conference in Roscommon in 2018, it was awarded best delegation.

=== Donogh O'Malley Cumann – University College Cork ===
The Donogh O'Malley Cumann is the University College Cork branch of Ógra. Founded in 1967, its first AGM was chaired by Jack Lynch. Former members of the cumann include the current leader of the party Taoiseach Micheál Martin, European Commissioner Michael McGrath (Irish politician), Minister for Education Norma Foley and Senator Lorraine Clifford-Lee.

=== Wolfe Tone Cumann – Trinity College Dublin ===
The Trinity College Dublin (TCD) branch is named in honor of Irish revolutionary and Trinity graduate, Theobald Wolfe Tone. The Cumann was officially constituted in 1967 and was initially named after Erskine Childers. In 1998 the cumann was renamed the Wolfe Tone Cumann, to mark the bicentenary of the 1798 Rebellion. It has a long history of activism within Ógra on a national basis. Past members include; Thomas Byrne, Seán Haughey, Jack Chambers, James Lawless, Mary Harney, Mary Lou McDonald and Dara Calleary.

=== Cumann De Barra – University of Galway ===
Cumann De Barra is the branch in the University of Galway (UG). Meetings were held off campus for many years before it was officially recognised by university authorities and allowed to host itself as an official society of the university in 1954. Like its sister Cumann in University College Dublin (UCD), it is also named after Kevin Barry, a medical student at UCD who fought and was executed during the Irish War of Independence. To avoid confusion however, it officially changed its name to the Irish language version to reflect UG's reputation as the Irish language university.

Notable former members include former Fianna Fáil TD Michael P. Kitt, the President of Ireland Michael D. Higgins (before he joined the Labour Party), Senator Terry Leyden, Senator Lisa Chambers and former MEP Seán Ó Neachtain.

=== Other third level branches ===
There are other branches of Ógra Fianna Fáil in third level institutions throughout the country, including:

- Atlantic Technological University Sligo Cumann
- Atlantic Technological University Galway-Mayo – Liam Mellows Cumann
- Dundalk Institute of Technology Cumann
- Maynooth University – Seán Lemass Cumann
- Munster Technological University Cork – Jeremiah O'Donovan Rossa Cumann
- South East Technological University Carlow – James Fintan Lalor Cumann
- South East Technological University Waterford – Thomas Francis Meagher Cumann
- Technological University Dublin – Kathleen Clarke Cumann
- University of Limerick – Con Colbert Cumann
- Ulster University – Watty Graham Cumann
- Queen's University Belfast – William Drennan Cumann
