= JRG =

JRG may refer to:

- Revolutionary Government Junta of El Salvador (Junta Revolucionaria de Gobierno)
- Young Radicals of the Left (Jeunes Radicaux de Gauche)
- Jangareddygudem
- Veer Surendra Sai Airport, Odisha, India (by IATA code)
