= Young Progressives =

Young Progressive Slovakia Mladé Progresívne Slovensko
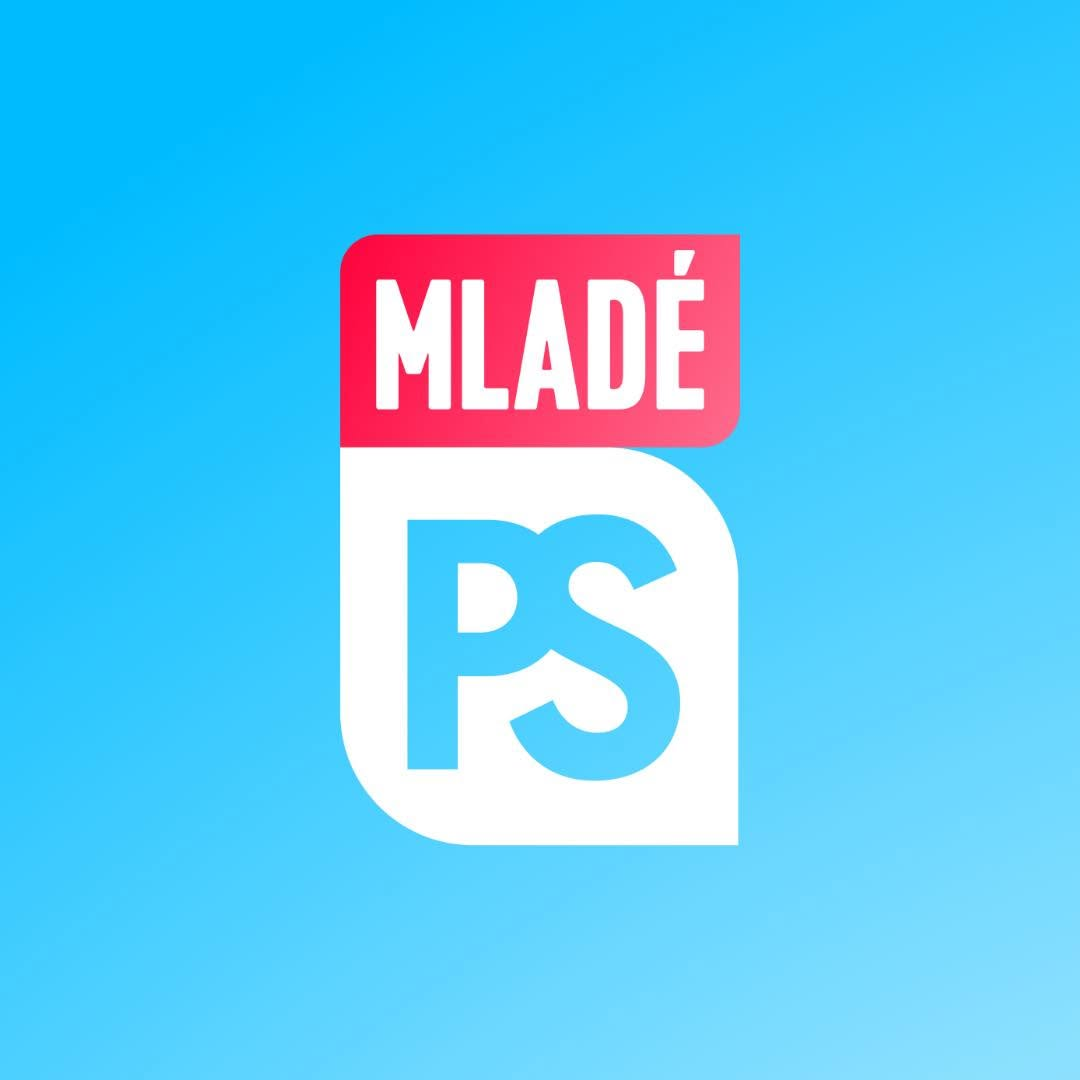
- President: Martin Marius; Karolína Blunárová
- Vice President: Nicholas Murphy; Klára Muránska; Oliver Mýtnik
- Founded: 2018
- Headquarters: Bratislava, Slovakia
- Ideology: Social liberalism Environmentalism; Progressivism
- Mother party: Progressive Slovakia
- International affiliation: International Federation of Liberal Youth (IFLRY)(associate members)
- European affiliation: European Liberal Youth (LYMEC)
- Website: mladeps.sk

Young Progressive Slovakia (Slovak: Mladé Progresívne Slovensko, mPS) is a social liberal youth organization in Slovakia connected to the political party Progressive Slovakia.

== History ==
Young Progressives was founded in 2018. Since 2023, the organization has been a full member of the European Liberal Youth and an associate member of the International Federation of Liberal Youth.
