= Young Democrats (Netherlands) =

Youth wing

Young Democrats Jonge Democraten
- President: Guy Kortes
- Secretary General: Caitlin Lamfers
- Treasurer: Jaco van der Meij
- Founded: 3 March 1984; 42 years ago
- Headquarters: Lange Houtstraat 11, The Hague
- Ideology: Social liberalism
- Mother party: Democrats 66
- International affiliation: International Federation of Liberal Youth (IFLRY)
- European affiliation: European Liberal Youth (LYMEC)
- Website: www.jongedemocraten.nl

The Young Democrats (Dutch: Jonge Democraten; JD) is a social-liberal youth organisation in the Netherlands, founded in 1984. Although independent, it is affiliated with the social-liberal Democrats 66 party. With over 5,000 members, it is the largest political youth organisation of the Netherlands.

== Principles ==
According to its Declaration of Principles, the Young Democrats are a liberal-democratic youth organisation. Its main objective is to contribute to the individual development of every person. Core values of the Young Democrats are liberty, equality, solidarity, sustainability and pragmatism. The JD is also in favour of the radical democratisation of society.

== Policies ==
- The Young Democrats advocate reforming social security to increase labour participation. JD is in favour of gradually raising the retirement age to 67 years from the current age of 65.

Young Democrat (r) and MEP Sophie in 't Veld (formerly affiliated with D66) campaigning in favour of the European Constitution

- The Young Democrats are in favour of ending the right of faith-based schools to refuse enrolment by pupils on the basis of religion.
- The Young Democrats are supporters of gradually phasing out tax breaks for home owners paying interest on a mortgage.
- The Young Democrats support liberal policies such as euthanasia, gay marriage, abortion and the legalisation of sex work. The JD also wishes to see the production of softdrugs legalised.
- The Young Democrats oppose counter-terrorism measures that are neither proportional nor have proven effective. In particular, JD opposes current legislation obliging citizens to be able to prove their identity at any time. JD rejects a ban on the wearing of the burqa in public spaces.
- The Young Democrats are in favour of more direct democracy in the form of referendums and direct elections for the offices of Prime Minister and mayor.
- The Young Democrats are in favour of more investment in renewable energy sources and fully support the Kyoto Protocol. The JD is not opposed to nuclear energy, as it contributes to cutting greenhouse gas emissions.
- The Young Democrats are European federalists and wish to see more European cooperation on immigration, defence and foreign policy.
- The Young Democrats support international law and human rights.

== Organisation ==
The Congress is the sovereign body of the Young Democrats and meets three times a year. During the Congress members of the National Board are elected individually and JD policy is decided through resolutions, amendments and motions. All members have equal say through the one man, one vote system.

=== National Board ===
The day-to-day management of the Young Democrats is in the hands of the National Board, the members of which are:

- President: Rachelle Smook
- Secretary-General: Johan Edward
- Treasurer: Merel Warmerdam
- Political Officer: Rune Oomen
- Organisation Officer: Shaniqua Monsels
- Internal Affairs Officer: Douwe Brandenburg
- External Affairs Officer: Yarnick Pander

=== Local branches ===
Currently, the Young Democrats have eight local branches, most of which are based in university cities, such as Amsterdam, Utrecht, Rotterdam and Leiden. Every branch has a local board and organises regular general meetings where local board members are elected and policy is decided. Every local member has the right to vote at the local general meetings. The local branches are:

- Amsterdam, for the province of North Holland and the Flevopolder
- Leiden-Haaglanden, for Leiden, The Hague and Delft
- Rotterdam, for the southern part of the province of South Holland and the province of Zeeland
- Brabant, for the province of North Brabant
- Limburg, for the province of Limburg
- Arnhem-Nijmegen, for the provinces of Gelderland and Overijssel
- Utrecht, for the province of Utrecht
- Groningen-Drenthe, for the provinces of Groningen and Drenthe
- Fryslân, for the province of Friesland

== International ties ==
The Young Democrats of the Netherlands, similarly to the Youth Organisation Freedom and Democracy (JOVD), are members of both the European Liberal Youth (LYMEC) and the International Federation of Liberal Youth (IFLRY). Young Democrat Bart Woord was the president of the IFLRY Bureau from November 2009 to November 2010. Furthermore, there exist close bilateral ties with the German, Belgian, British and Tunisian young liberals.
