= Young Radicals of the Left =

French social-liberal youth organization

Young Radicals of the Left Jeunes Radicaux de Gauche
- Chairperson: Géraldine Guilpain
- Secretary General: Lucas Duval
- Treasurer: Clémentine-Audrey Simonnet
- Headquarters: Paris
- Ideology: Social liberalism
- Mother party: Radical Party of the Left
- International affiliation: International Federation of Liberal Youth (IFLRY)
- European affiliation: European Liberal Youth (LYMEC)
- Website: www.jeunesradicauxdegauche.com

The Young Radicals of the Left (French: Jeunes Radicaux de Gauche abbreviated as JRG), are the youth organisation of the French social-liberal Radical Party of the Left. In opposition to its common understanding of its name, the YRL are a moderate centre-left political party.

The party gathers members under 29 years of age all throughout France.

== Organisation ==
It is led by its president elected for two years by all members of the party. The President itself appoints six members of the National Board and furthermore, the President also appoints National Officers. Since May 2008, the party organises itself autonomously within the Radical Party of the Left.

=== National Board ===
- President: Cindy Chades
- Vice-President: Sofiane Igoudjil
- Vice-President: Nicolas Sauzeat
- Vice-President: Noémie Veraquin
- General Secretary: Lucas Duval
- Deputy General Secretary: Anaïs Salabert
- Treasurer: Axel Bossy

=== National Officers ===
The Young Radicals of the Left have 12 National Officers.

=== National Council ===
The national council is the sovereign body of the Young Radicals of the Left and gathers the 7 members of the National Board, the 12 National Officers, Regional Delegates and members who are representing the YRL in various institutions.

=== Former presidents ===
- Jean-Francois Auduc (1973)
- Jean-Pierre Mattei (1976–1977)
- Jean-Maurice Duval (1977–1978)
- Daniel Sejourne (1980–1981)
- Bruno Martin (1981–1984)
- Daniel Guerin (1984–1986)
- Jean-Marc Ambrosini (1986–1987)
- Thierry Braillard (1987–1991)
- Julien Duquenne (2002–2005)
- Olivier Maillebuau (2005–2010)
- Sandra-Elise Reviriego (2010–2012)
- Selim-Alexandre Arrad-Baudean (2012–2014)
- Géraldine Guilpain (2014–2016)
- Yanis Mallion (2016–2019)
- unknown (2019–2021)

== Policies ==
- The YRL advocate republicanism, insisting on laïcité (secularism), and positioning them against the idea of affirmative action as advocating equality of treatment between all citizens.
- The YRL also defend the idea of individual and civil liberties and the concept of progressivism supporting gay marriage, right to abort and euthanasia.
- The Young Radicals of the Left desire a 6th Republic with more transparent and democratic institutions.
- The YRL support the idea of a Federal Europe and support also the accession of Turkey to the European Union.
- The Young Radicals of the Left wishes to apply the concept of Laïcité over the whole territory of France (nowaday, in Alsace and Moselle, secularism between the Church and the State is still not implemented). They asked for introducing the notion of secularism in the IFLRY Manifesto in Istanbul in 2011; their motion was accepted.

== International affiliations ==
The YRL are full members of the International Federation of Liberal Youth (IFLRY) and associate members of the LYMEC since 2013. A member of the YRL was elected President of the LYMEC in 1994.

=== International Officers ===
- Since 2014 : Yanis Malion (Vice-President in charge of external relationships)
- 2012-2014 : Olympio Kyprianou
- 2010-2012 : Nasha Gagnebin
- 2008-2010 : Romain Rocher
- 2008 : Sandra-Elise Reviriego
- 2006-2008 : Michel Lejeune-Mengwang
- 2006 : Caroline Gillet

== See also ==
- Radical Party of the Left
