= LHG =

LHG may refer to:

- Bundesverband Liberaler Hochschulgruppen, a student association in the Federal Republic of Germany
- Icelandic Coast Guard (Landhelgisgæslan), the maritime law enforcement agency of Iceland
- Liberty House Group, the holding company of Liberty Steel
- Lightning Ridge Airport, the IATA code LHG
- Logan Heights Gang, a street gang in San Diego, California
- Lufthansa, the flag carrier of Germany
- Lunar horizon glow, a glow seen in Lunar sky during sunset
