= Young Liberals (UK) =

Youth wing of the British Liberal Democrats

- President: Stephen Robinson
- Chairperson: Will Tennison
- Secretary: Harvey Thomas-Benton
- Founded: 1993 (as Liberal Democrat Youth and Students )
- Preceded by: NLYL ULS YSD
- Headquarters: Liberal Democrat Headquarters; First Floor, 66 Buckingham Gate, London. SW1E 6AU.
- Ideology: Liberalism (British); Social liberalism Internationalism; Pro-Europeanism
- European affiliation: European Liberal Youth (LYMEC)
- International affiliation: International Federation of Liberal Youth (IFLRY)
- Colours: Orange
- Mother Party: Liberal Democrats

Website
- www.youngliberals.uk

Young Liberals is the youth and student organisation of the British Liberal Democrats. Membership is automatic for members of the Liberal Democrats aged under 30. It organises a number of Fringe events at the Liberal Democrat Conference, which is held twice each year.

Young Liberals exists to campaign on issues affecting young people and students, with branches across the UK. The organisation is run by young people and acts as a pressure group within the Liberal Democrats.

Social liberalism, economic liberalism, social justice, internationalism and pro-Europeanism are important components of the group's political philosophy.

The constitution of the Liberal Democrats requires an affiliated youth and student wing. Accordingly, Young Liberals is a Specified Associated Organisation (SAO) of the party. It is granted voting rights on various Liberal Democrat committees, such as the Party's Federal Board.

Young Liberals is affiliated to both the International Federation of Liberal and Radical Youth (IFLRY) and European Liberal Youth. Its predecessors include Liberal Youth, founded in 2008, and Liberal Democrat Youth & Students, founded in 1990. The earliest organisations were the National League of Young Liberals (NLYL), founded in 1903 and the Union of Liberal Students (ULS), founded in 1920.

== Organisation and structure ==
=== Federal organisation ===
The Young Liberals are a Federal organisation composed of three equal components:

- the Welsh Young Liberals in Wales,
- the Scottish Young Liberals in Scotland, and
- the English Young Liberals in England.

This mirrors the Liberal Democrats own Federal Model, with each British nation possessing a corresponding 'State Party'.

=== Executive ===
The Executive is responsible for the day-to-day operation of the Young Liberals, ensuring the organisation's operations are compliant with its own and the Liberal Democrats constitution, ensuring that the organisation is compliant with all relevant laws, and maintaining affiliations, branch accreditation and electing representatives to outside bodies which the Young Liberals are given representation on.

==== Honorary roles ====
There is an Honorary President and six Honorary Vice-Presidents of the organisation, who are elected by the membership to work alongside the executive to support the organisation, advise and often act as a form of institutional memory as well as give the Executive guidance and to act as spokespeople within the wider party.

=== Committees ===
In addition to the Executive, there are seven committees that are responsible for the administration, direction and implementation of policy and strategy corresponding to their area.

=== Branches ===
Young Liberals Branches are organised under regions and nations. They are small scale local groups often centering on a particular university, or local Liberal Democrat Party. Branches provide an opportunity for Young Liberals to socialise, network and campaign on a local level. There are over 30 active Branches across Great Britain including the Cambridge University Liberal Association and Oxford Students Liberal Association.

== History ==
The Liberal Party and the Social Democratic Party (SDP) each had their own separate student and youth wings, including the Young Liberals and the Young Social Democrats. In 1988, the Liberal Party and the SDP merged to form the Liberal Democrats.

Within England, the National League of Young Liberals merged with the Young Social Democrats to form Young Liberal Democrats of England. Additionally the Union of Liberal Students merged with the Students for Social Democracy to form the Student Liberal Democrats. Within Scotland, a separate organ was formed from the Scottish Liberal Students, the Scottish Young Liberal Democrats, which also included students of all ages.

Liberal Democrat Youth and Students (LDYS) was created in 1993 from the merger of the Student Liberal Democrats and the Young Liberal Democrats of England who had shared many resources in the run-up. The merger talks were overseen by a committee which included Sarah Gurling. LDYS reorganised into a federal structure in 2000 and then admitted Scottish Young Liberal Democrats as its Scottish federal unit in 2002—forming a single Britain-wide organisation for the first time since the combined ULS-NLYL committees of the 1970s.

Spring 2008 saw LDYS renamed as Liberal Youth, at an event hosted by the Liberal Democrat leader, Nick Clegg. It was then later renamed The Young Liberals in 2016, the organisation has established a 'Liberal Youth Tax' where it asks older members who mistakenly refer to YL as the Liberal Youth to donate to the organisation.

Alumni of the Young Liberals include Former Prime Minister Liz Truss, former MP and leader of the Liberal Democrats Jo Swinson, and current MP Sarah Green.

== Conferences ==
The federal Conference is the sovereign body of the Young Liberals and has power to determine policy and direction. The federal Young Liberals usually hosts two conferences a year, a conference in the Winter and a training weekend known as 'Activate' in the Summer, which also acts as the constitutionally mandated Annual General Meeting. At conferences policy motions which shape YL policy and amendments to the organisations constitution are debated, alongside training and speaker sessions.

In addition, during each conference there is an Executive Scrutiny session, whereby members of the executive submit reports to conference on their activities and actions in their job. After each report motions on officers are debated, wherein any member can submit a Motion of commendation, Motion of censure or Motion of no confidence in an officer. Motions of commendation and censure are non-binding opinions of conference passed by a simple majority, expressing either positive or negative opinion on the actions of an officer. Motions of no confidence are binding motions which if passed have the effect of removing an officer from their position and require a two thirds majority in order to pass.

All Conferences following Manchester 2021, the first in person conference following the COVID-19 pandemic, are held as hybrid conferences. Hybrid conferences allow members to join in debates via Confera, an in-house developed and bespoke software package (and mobile app) which allows hybrid participation and voting in democratic events.

== See also ==
- Liberal Democrat Conference
- Liberal Reform
- Social Liberal Forum
- Cambridge University Liberal Association
- Oxford University Liberal Democrats
- Young Labour
- Young Conservatives
