= Naomi Ichihara Røkkum =

Norwegian politician (born 1987)

Naomi Ichihara Røkkum (born 1987) is a Norwegian politician in the Liberal Party, and a substitute member of the Oslo City Council.

== Political career ==
She was the Vice President and later the Secretary General of the International Federation of Liberal Youth (IFLRY). Røkkum has also been Young Liberals of Norway's International Officer and board member from 2007–2010, and also served in the Young Liberals of Norway' s debate team during the local elections in 2007 and the manifesto committee that revised the policy platform in 2007-2008. Røkkum has also engaged in the Liberal Party of Norway locally, worked for the Liberal Party's parliamentary group in the local elections in 2007, been a Member of the Liberal Party's International Committee since 2007 and a Substitute Member to the National Board since 2012.

She has also been active in student politics, first as a representative in the Welfare Council and then as International Officer of the Student Parliament at University of Oslo, where she among other things, made an effort to start a global student movement through the International Coordination Working Group (ICWG). She is currently the Vice President of the Norwegian Liberal Student Association (NLSF).

== Affiliations ==
Røkkum is a board member of Norwegian Students' and Academics' International Assistance Fund (SAIH) from 2008, Member of Norwegian Red Cross Youth's International Committee from 2011, worked voluntarily with drug addicts and with students with mental or physical challenges, and worked as a consultant to the Andersen's Schooling and Consulting (ASC) teaching multi-cultural understanding to company employees and their families that are to be stationed. In addition, she has been a board member of Youth and Research Foundation and the President of the Young Scientists of Norway.

== International activities ==
Røkkum has been a delegate at several UN meetings. First on the European Students' Union's delegation to UNESCO' s World Conference on Higher Education that adopted UNESCO's education policy for the next ten years. Then she attended UNFCCC's Climate Negotiations, COP15, in Copenhagen on the International Federation of Liberal Youth (IFLRY)'s delegation, which she also helped coordinate the delegation of 100 young people from around the world. Furthermore, she has represented IFLRY at an ECOSOC meeting at the UN headquarters in New York and been a delegate for the Liberal International (LI) at the United Nations Human Rights Council (UNHRC). Parallel to the participation in the Human Rights Council, Røkkum co-organized the Geneva Summit for Human Rights and Democracy.

== Awards and recognition ==
In 2006, Røkkum was awarded with 2nd place in the Norwegian Competition for Young Scientists with the essay "Japan's role in the Second World War and in the Japanese Invasion: The Historiographical Presentation in Japanese Junior High School Textbooks". She also presented the topic for scientists from worldwide as a panel participant in the Japan Anthropology Workshop 2007 (JAWS).

== Personal life ==
Røkkum has a Norwegian father and a Japanese mother.

== Bibliography ==
- "若者文化――「人民を映す鏡」のなかの若者たち" in ノルウェーを知るための60章 (2014)
