= Oxford Students Liberal Association =

Society at the University of Oxford, dating back to 1913

- Abbreviation: OSLA
- Formation: 1913
- Type: Student political society
- Location: Oxford, United Kingdom
- President: Harry Morgan
- Senior Member: Dr Stephen Goddard
- Key people: Honorary Chair - Richard Newby, Baron Newby Honorary President - Zagham Farhan Honorary Vice-President - Heather Judge
- Parent organisation: Young Liberals
- Affiliations: Cambridge University Liberal Association
- Website: www.oxuniliberals.com
- Formerly called: Oxford University Liberal Club; Oxford University Social Democrats; Oxford University Liberal Democrats Oxford University Liberal Association

The Oxford Students Liberal Association, formerly Oxford University Liberal Democrats, is the student branch of the Liberal Democrats for students at the University of Oxford, with the purpose of promoting liberalism, liberal values, the Liberal Democrats and a spirit of cross party collaboration. It is affiliated with the federal Young Liberals.

It was previously known as the Oxford University Liberal Democrats, which emerged from the 1987 merger of the Oxford University Liberal Club and the Oxford University Social Democrats.

== History ==
The Oxford University Liberal Club was founded in 1913, with the stated aim to "rally progressive members of the University to the support of Liberal principles". Its foundation date makes it the oldest political society founded at an English university. It was formed from a merger of two older Liberal societies at Oxford, the Russell Club, and the Palmerston Club, both of which dated to at least the 1870s, and had as their goals the promotion of liberal politics. Around in the early 1900s was also a society called the 'Liberal League', founded "in defence of free trade".

Originally holding premises on the corner of Cornmarket Street and George Street, open for the majority of the day, the society was modelled after the usual gentlemen's clubs of the day, before the arrival of World War I and the general reduction in the student body of Oxford. The society faced further problems in the 1920s, as around half of its members defected and joined the newly established Labour Club, as well as the New Reform Club, a pro-Lloyd George group, reflecting the division of the national Liberal Party at the time.

Revitalisation occurred with the coming to the fore of Harold Wilson, Treasurer in Hilary 1935, along with Frank Byers as president and Raymond Walton as secretary. Efforts made to provide a stronger draw to the society – including the institution of a society newspaper and library – had membership treble to over 300. Membership continued to grow during and after the war, with its peak hit under the Presidency of Jeremy Thorpe in 1950; at its peak, it had over 1,000 members. By this point, the Liberal Club had become more of a social club, including drinking events, balls, and parties, some of which are continued by the society in its modern form.

Turbulence for the national party meant turbulence for the society itself, however; the party's catastrophic collapse in the 1960s, combined with mergers throughout the late 1970s and 1980s, led to a smaller membership and a series of renamings and mergers for the society at large. After merging the Oxford University Liberal Club and the Oxford University Social Democrats in 1987, however, the society in its present structure was formed, with a smaller membership focussed more heavily on campaigning, but maintaining the social functions from its post-war heyday.

The society entered a period of hiatus in 2022, before being resurrected in 2024 by Zagham Farhan. The society functions much like the Oxford University Conservative Association or Labour Club, hosting a weekly debate-drinking event, speakers and debates. The name was changed from the Oxford University Liberal Democrats to the Oxford Students Liberal Association at the beginning of Michaelmas 2024.

== Activities ==
=== Liquor and Liberalism ===
Every Wednesday night, the society hosts one of the best attended political society events in Oxford. Three motions are debated, with a very social atmosphere.

=== Speakers ===
The society regularly hosts prominent speakers from the Liberal Democrats and from outside the party. Speakers in recent terms have included Sir Nick Clegg, Lord Newby, Lord Hannan and Sir Vince Cable.

=== Campaigning ===
The society hosts regularly campaign days, in particular supporting candidates in Oxford City and Oxfordshire local elections.

=== Debates ===
The society is best known for its debates hosted in well-known locations. Recent terms have featured debates in the Welsh Parliament, the Oxford Union and the National Liberal Club on topics such as defence and federalism.

== List of Presidents ==
This is the list of prominent Ex-Presidents:

- Elizabeth Truss, Merton College (Hilary 1995)

=== 2024 Onwards ===
Year	Michaelmas	Hilary	Trinity
2023-2024		Zagham Farhan	Zagham Farhan
2024–2025	Zagham Farhan	William Lawson	William Lawson
2025-2026	Theodore Cunningham	Harry Morgan	

== See also ==
- Cambridge University Liberal Association
- Oxford University Conservative Association
- Oxford University Labour Club
