= Emil Kirjas =

Macedonian politician

Emil Kirjas (born 26 June 1975, in Skopje) is a former Macedonian politician. He served as junior minister of Foreign Affairs of the Republic of Macedonia from 2004 to 2006. He is currently a vice-president of Liberal International, the oldest political international in the world based in London, where he was one of the longest serving secretaries-general (from 2007 to 2017). In 2007 he was elected a vice-president of the Liberal Democratic Party (North Macedonia) for a mandate of 2 years.

He is a former president of the International Federation of Liberal Youth (IFLRY), a position which he occupied from 2001 to 2005, after having served as secretary-general (1999-2001) and vice-president of the organisation.

His career includes working for various international organisations and institutions, including the Friedrich Naumann Foundation, the Council of Europe and the Organization for Security and Co-operation in Europe. In 2017 he founded Kirjas Global Ltd. and currently advises heads of states and prominent political leaders world-wide.

He graduated with a master's degree in geopolitics, territory and security from King's College London in 2007 where he was a Chevening Scholar. He holds an engineering degree in computer science from the Ss. Cyril and Methodius University of Skopje.
