= Save Romania Union Youth =

USR Youth USR Tineret
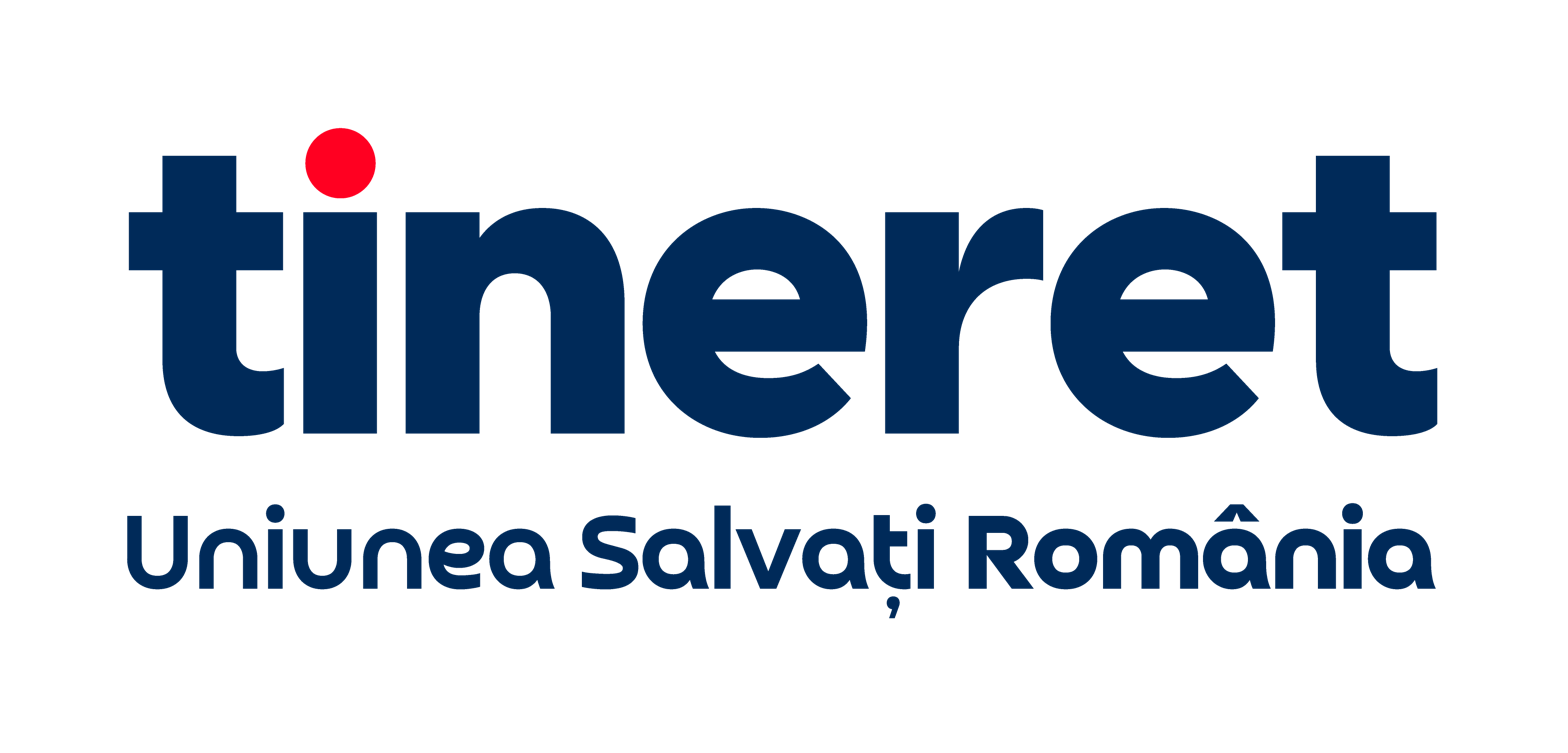
- President: Alexia Petrovai
- Vice President: Adeline Petrovici; Roberto David; Radu Diaconu; Ștefan Lontcovschi; Vlad Porcărașu; Iustina Ardelean; Alin Simionescu; Ilinca Ghiza; Andrei Grecu; Daniel Korcsek; Maria Kiss; Alexandru Furtună; Dan Sandu; Raul Mihai
- Founded: 2019
- Headquarters: Blvd. Aviatorilor, 9 Bucharest
- Mother party: Save Romania Union (USR)
- International affiliation: IFLRY (full)
- LYMEC affiliation: 2019 (associate); 2021 (full)

USR Youth (Romanian: USR Tineret) is the youth organisation of the Save Romania Union (USR). It was created under Article 89 of the party statute.

== Leadership ==
From 2018 to 2020, the organisation had a decentralised structure and lacked a traditional hierarchical style of leadership, owing to its rather informal nature. A definitive statute was adopted in 2020, and an executive board was elected in May 2020.

Alongside the president, directly elected by the organisation's members, there are 14 vice presidents assigned to the following portfolios: international relations, public policy, communication, human resources, civil society, and a final one tasked with managing the relationship with the rest of the party.

== Stance on cannabis ==
USR Tineret is the first youth organisation of a Romanian political party to openly support the decriminalisation of cannabis. The organisation was critical of a bill project by USR MP Lavinia Cosma, meant to impose harsher punishments for cannabis trafficking.

== Controversies ==
In November 2019, the organisation's Facebook page posted a viral meme comparing King Michael of Romania to manele singer Florin Salam in a tongue-in-cheek manner, in the context of Timișoara mayor Nicolae Robu banning the manele genre in the city's public areas. The meme was harshly criticised by Romanian conservatives and monarchists affiliated with the National Liberal Party (PNL).

== See also ==
- Official website
