= Cambridge University Liberal Association =

Student political society

- The current logo of Cambridge University Liberal Association
- Abbreviation: CULA
- Predecessor: Cambridge Student Liberal Democrats (1991—2017) (For previous names, please see the section titled 'Changing names')
- Founded: 1886; 140 years ago
- Type: Student political society
- Location: Cambridge
- Chair: Cat Smyly, Emmanuel
- President: Julian Huppert, Jesus
- Parent organisation: Liberal Democrats
- Affiliations: Oxford University Liberal Democrats
- Website: cula.org.uk

Cambridge University Liberal Association (CULA) is the student branch of the Liberal Democrats for students at the University of Cambridge.

Founded as Cambridge University Liberal Club (CULC) in 1886, it is the University's longest-established student political society, having remained in continuous existence from the time of its inception, other than during the First World War. It has been a long-term proponent of liberalism, an early supporter of European membership and a defender of civil rights and individual liberty, including LGBTQ+ rights. It also campaigns on green issues and the fight against human-induced climate change.

It is the successor to the Cambridge Student Liberal Democrats, which in turn was formed from the merger of Cambridge University Liberal Club and Cambridge University Social Democrats (founded in 1981) upon the creation of the Lib Dems in 1988.

In recent decades, it has campaigned against the Iraq War, removals of banking regulation and supervision, and Brexit.

== History ==
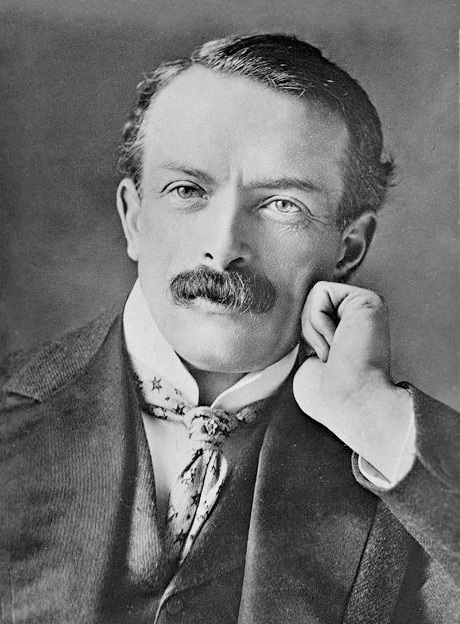
On 3 December 1909, Liberal Chancellor, and later Prime Minister, David Lloyd George, made an impassioned speech to the university's Liberal Club, railing against the House of Lords. It had blocked his People's Budget measures, which introduced state pensions and unemployment benefit, paid for by the taxation of large landowners. He spoke shortly before the "People's Budget" January 1910 United Kingdom general election

The society has long been active in Cambridge politics, with student members playing a role in electing David Howarth on a 15% swing in the 2005 election, when the student turnout was unusually and noticeably higher than that in the rest of the city, and then subsequently Julian Huppert as his successor in 2010.

The older of its founder societies, the Cambridge University Liberal Club, originally existed side by side with a discussion forum for radical Cambridge politics in the late 1880s, called 'The Rainbow Circle.' Alumni of this group relocated to London after their graduation, and helped found the Bloomsbury-based radical group of that same name in 1894.

Between 1886 and 1897, the club's founder Treasurer was Oscar Browning, a Fellow of King's and three-times Liberal candidate who was also Treasurer of the Cambridge Union Society. The society had varying fortunes as the Liberal Party waned in the mid-twentieth century.

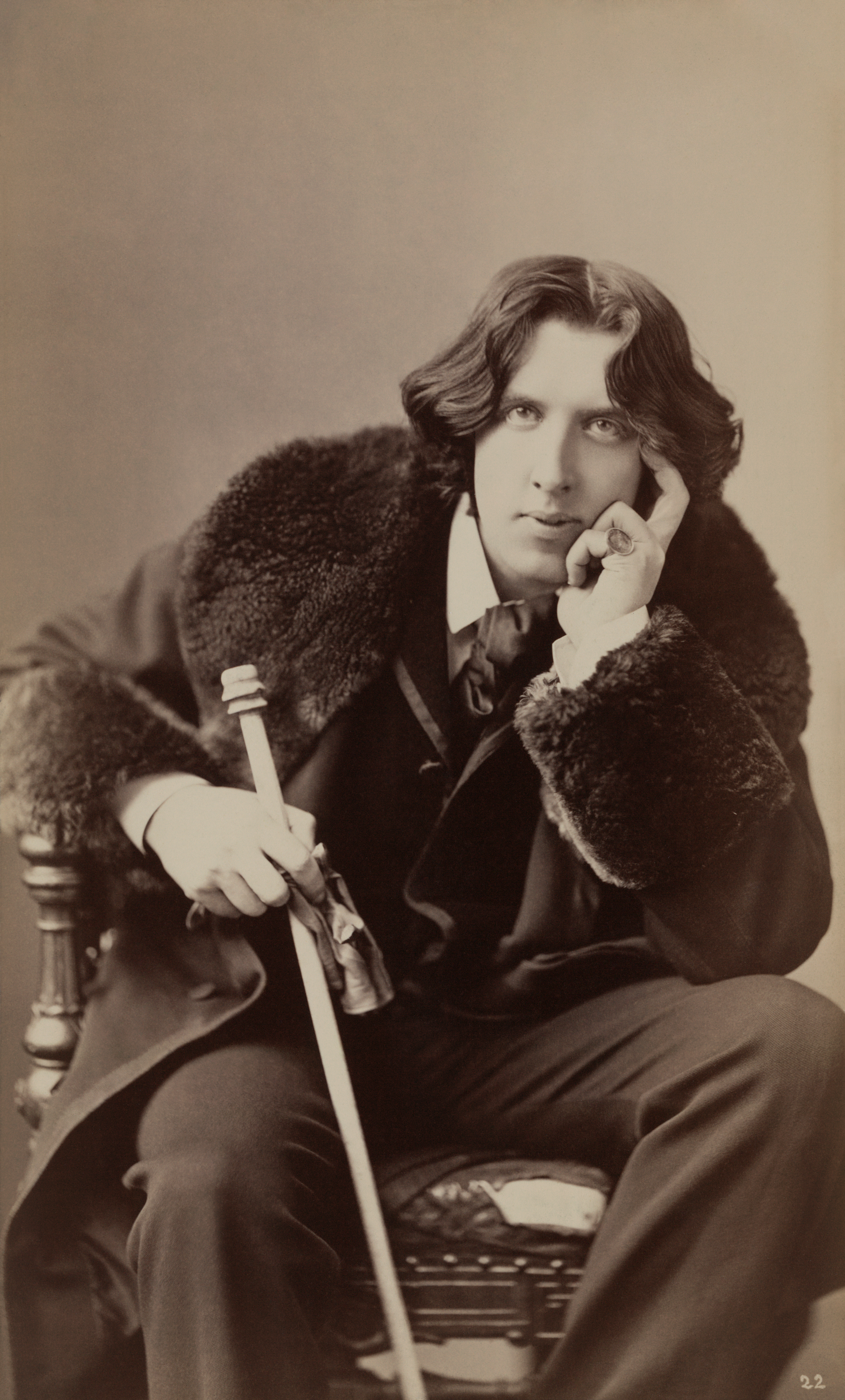
On 20 November 1889, the writer and playwright Oscar Wilde, a member of London's Liberal Eighty Club, addressed the university's Liberal Club, making clear his strong support for both Irish Home Rule and the policies of former, and future, Liberal Prime Minister, William Gladstone

Notable past speakers included the long-term Liberal supporter Oscar Wilde, as well as those not normally associated with the Liberal Party, such as Jerome K. Jerome (1912), W. H. Auden (1938), former Governor of Vermont Howard Dean, and Irish Prime Minister Seán Lemass (1961). A complete list of the society's past events from 1886 to the present is available here.

The society today attracts numerous high-profile speakers – in recent years, Vince Cable, Menzies Campbell, Nick Clegg, Simon Hughes, Chris Huhne, and David Steel. During the 2005 United Kingdom general election it helped organise a rally of 2,500 people with Charles Kennedy in Market Square.

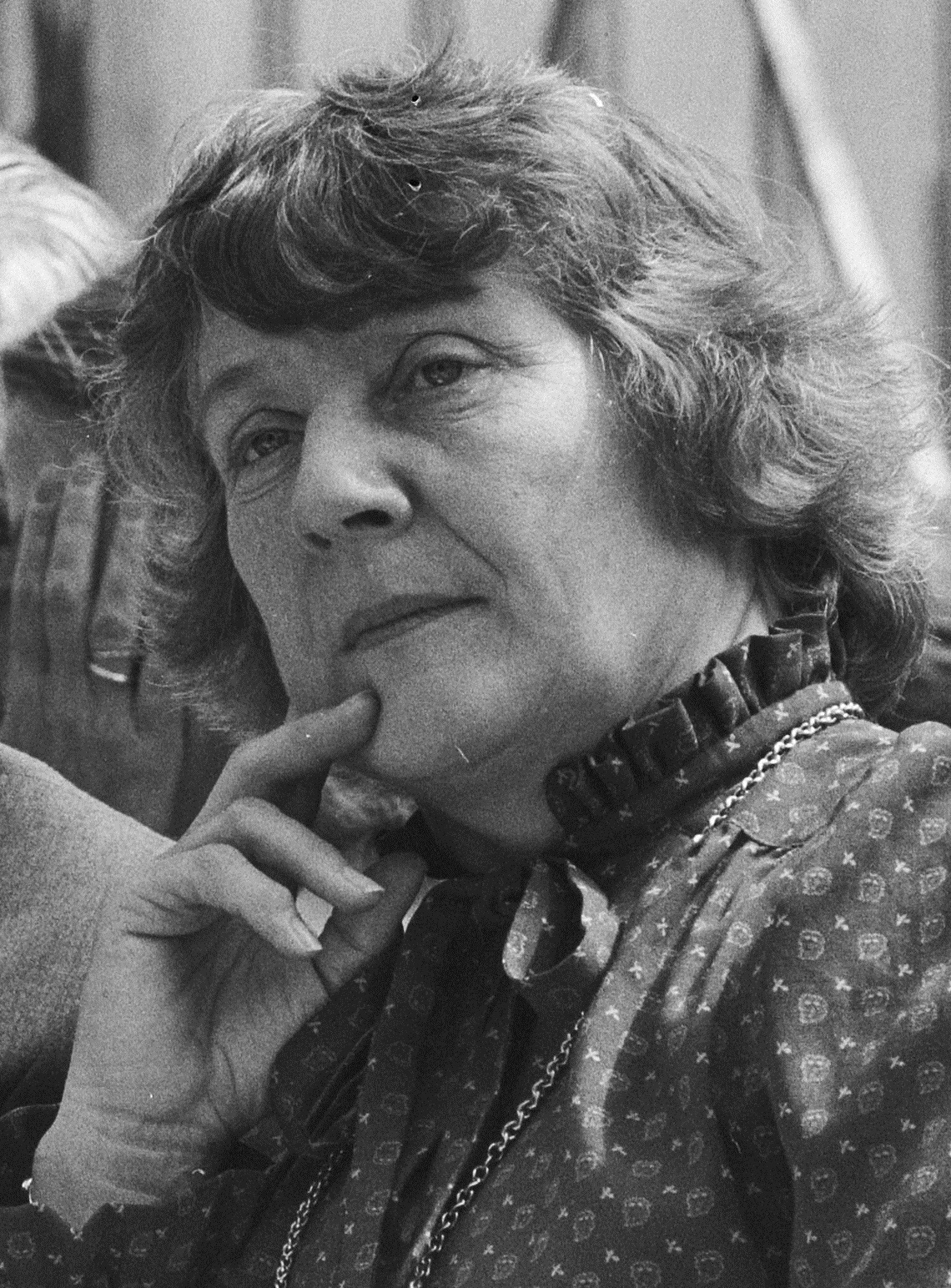
Shirley Williams, later Baroness Williams of Crosby, a former Labour Education Secretary, and founder member of the SDP. She was President of the SDP (1982–1987), Leader of the Liberal Democrats in the House of Lords (2001–2004) and President of the society for over thirty years (1988–2021), until her death

The society's president, from the 1988 merger, was Baroness Williams of Crosby, who had been the SDP candidate in Cambridge in 1987. She served as president until her death in 2021, after which the committee appointed former Cambridge MP Julian Huppert. Shirley Williams had previously been patron of Cambridge University Social Democrats in 1987-88.

== Activities ==
=== Campaigning ===
CULA has regular political campaigning sessions, and works to get liberals elected to both the University council and City Council. The Society is particularly active during General Election campaigns, and canvasses local voters.

=== Debates and Social Events ===
CULA runs regular debates and socials, from its signature Spirited Discussions group to quizzes, game nights, cocktail competitions and informal gatherings over ice cream.

=== Guest Speakers ===
CULA hosts liberal speakers including Lib Dem MPs and liberals from across the world.

=== Membership ===
CULA charges a single fee of £5 for lifetime membership, which provides discounts to society events.

== Campaigns ==
In 2005, the society joined the general election campaign with then-Liberal Democrat leader Charles Kennedy, in Cambridge's Market Square. The party subsequently won 62 parliamentary seats, its-then highest number

In Autumn 2015, the society ran a campaign against proposals by Cambridgeshire County Council to switch off streetlights in Cambridge after midnight. Working with the JCR at Trinity College and the Cambridge University Students' Union, the campaign was successful. A year later, focus switched to mental health provision within the university, with the society calling for the hiring of more counsellors in the University Counselling Service.

The society actively campaigns in elections at every level. In May 2017, the society helped secure the election of Liberal Democrats to the main student divisions of Cambridgeshire County Council.

They also organised regular campaign events for the general election later that year, but were less successful. In that vote the incumbent Labour MP Daniel Zeichner increased his majority to nearly 30,000 with the Liberal Democrats down 5.6 points.

In the 2018 City Council elections, the Association was integrated into a successful city-wide campaign where the local party gained two seats in student wards.

== Changing names ==
The society was continuously called Cambridge University Liberal Club (CULC) from 1886 until 1988 (and continued to function throughout that time, apart from the years 1916-9, when it suspended its activities due to World War I).

In 1981, Cambridge University Social Democrats (CUSD) was formed, as the Cambridge student branch of the SDP. With the Liberals and SDP in alliance nationally, CULC and CUSD remained independent organisations, but shared close links, hosted joint events, and put up joint slates of candidates in CSU elections.

In 1988, CULC and CUSD merged into one society, as the Liberals and SDP merged into the Liberal Democrats. They initially called themselves Cambridge University Social and Liberal Democrats throughout 1988, then Cambridge University Liberal Democrats throughout 1989–90, before finally settling early in 1991 for Cambridge Student Liberal Democrats, when the society expanded to include the Cambridge campus of the city's new Anglia Polytechnic (now Anglia Ruskin University). In 2017 the name was changed again to Cambridge University Liberal Association upon the creation of a Young Liberals branch catering to young people in the city who are not members of the University of Cambridge.

== Notable former members ==
As with many Cambridge political societies, CULA and its predecessors (such as the longstanding CULC), were the first political organisations to involve many people who went on to both political and non-political careers – and therefore a number ended up outside Liberal politics altogether. The following notable alumni, in the gallery of photographs immediately below, were all CULC members. Again in the gallery, descriptions of any official positions held are listed at the end of each relevant entry:

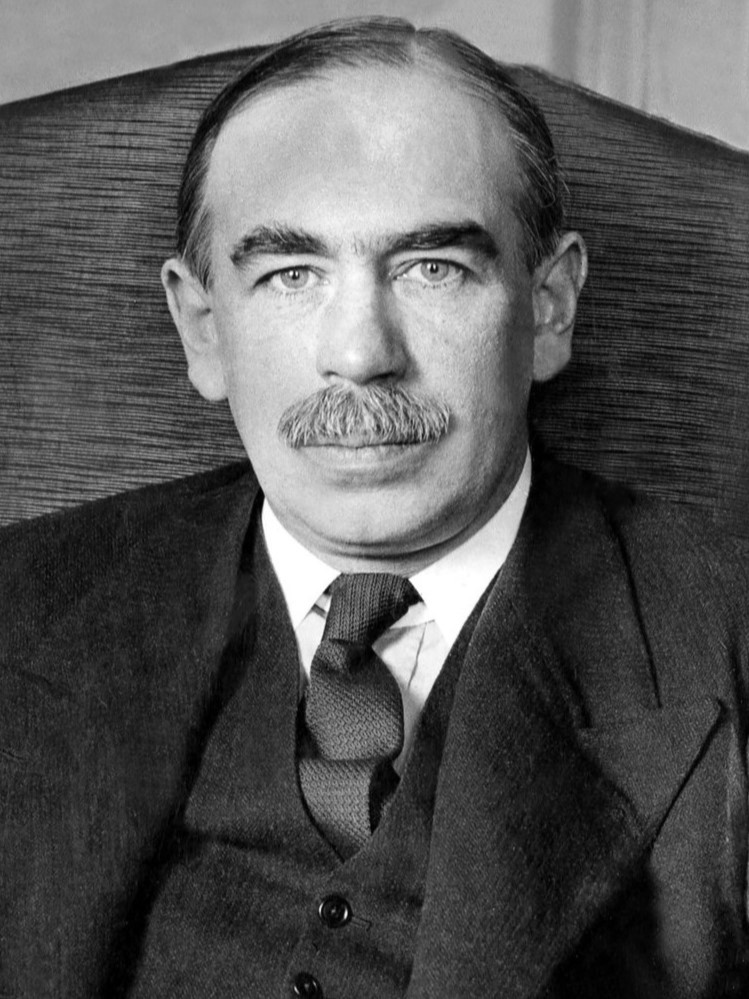
John Maynard Keynes, economist, editor and the founder of Keynesian economic theory and CULC President (1905)

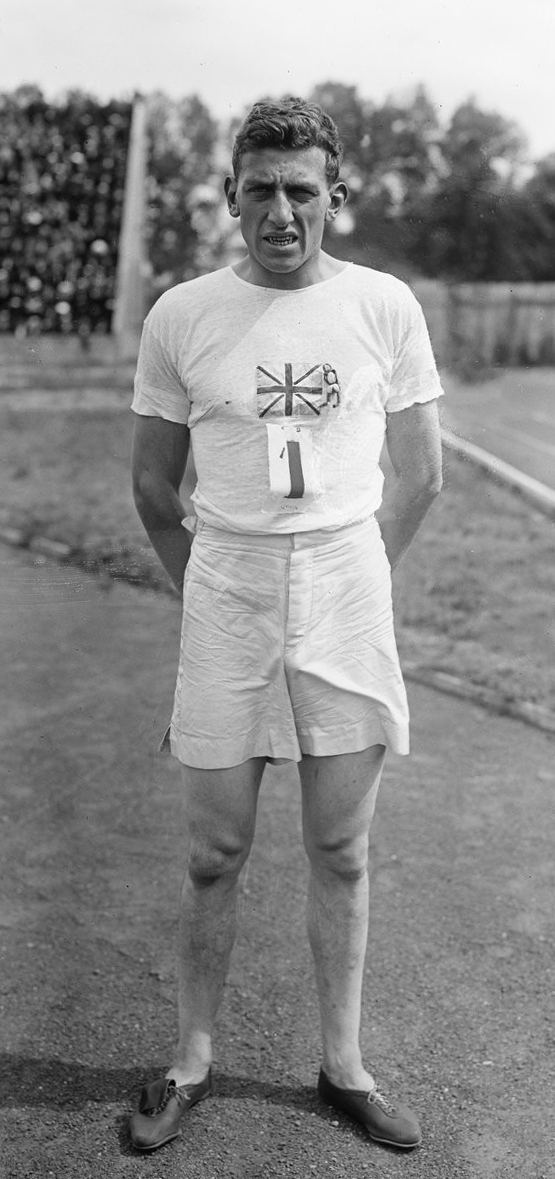
Harold Abrahams, Gold Medallist at the Olympic Games in 1924, and whose efforts to win were portrayed in the 1981 film, Chariots of Fire

Peter Cook, comedian, actor, satirist and playwright, who formed a comedic duo with Dudley Moore

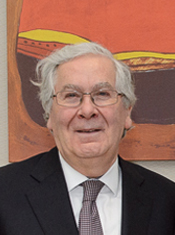
Mervyn King, economist and former Deputy Governor and Governor of the Bank of England. CULC Treasurer (1968)

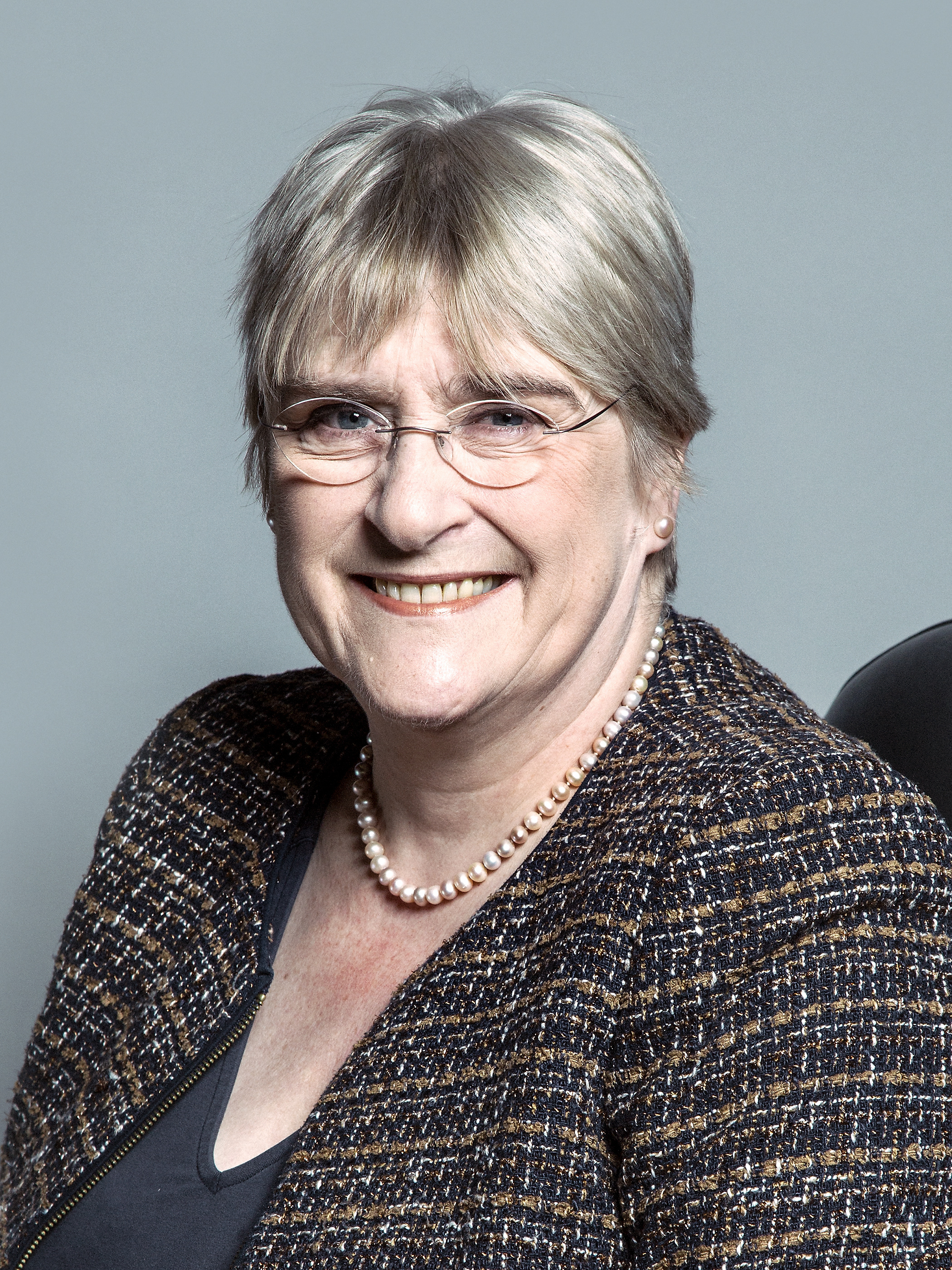
Sal Brinton, businesswoman, former television producer, councillor, President of the Liberal Democrats (2015–19), and Lib Dem peer

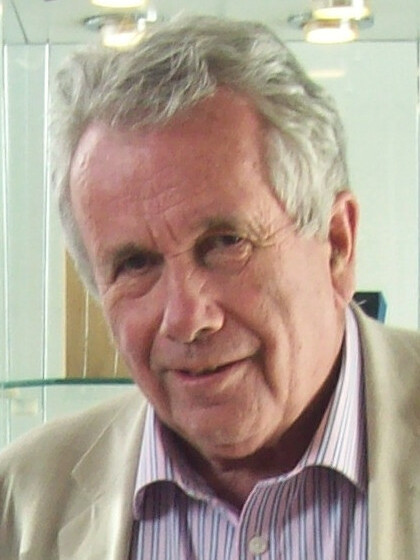
Martin Bell, former BBC correspondent, Independent MP (1997–2001) and anti-corruption campaigner. CULC Publicity Officer (1960)

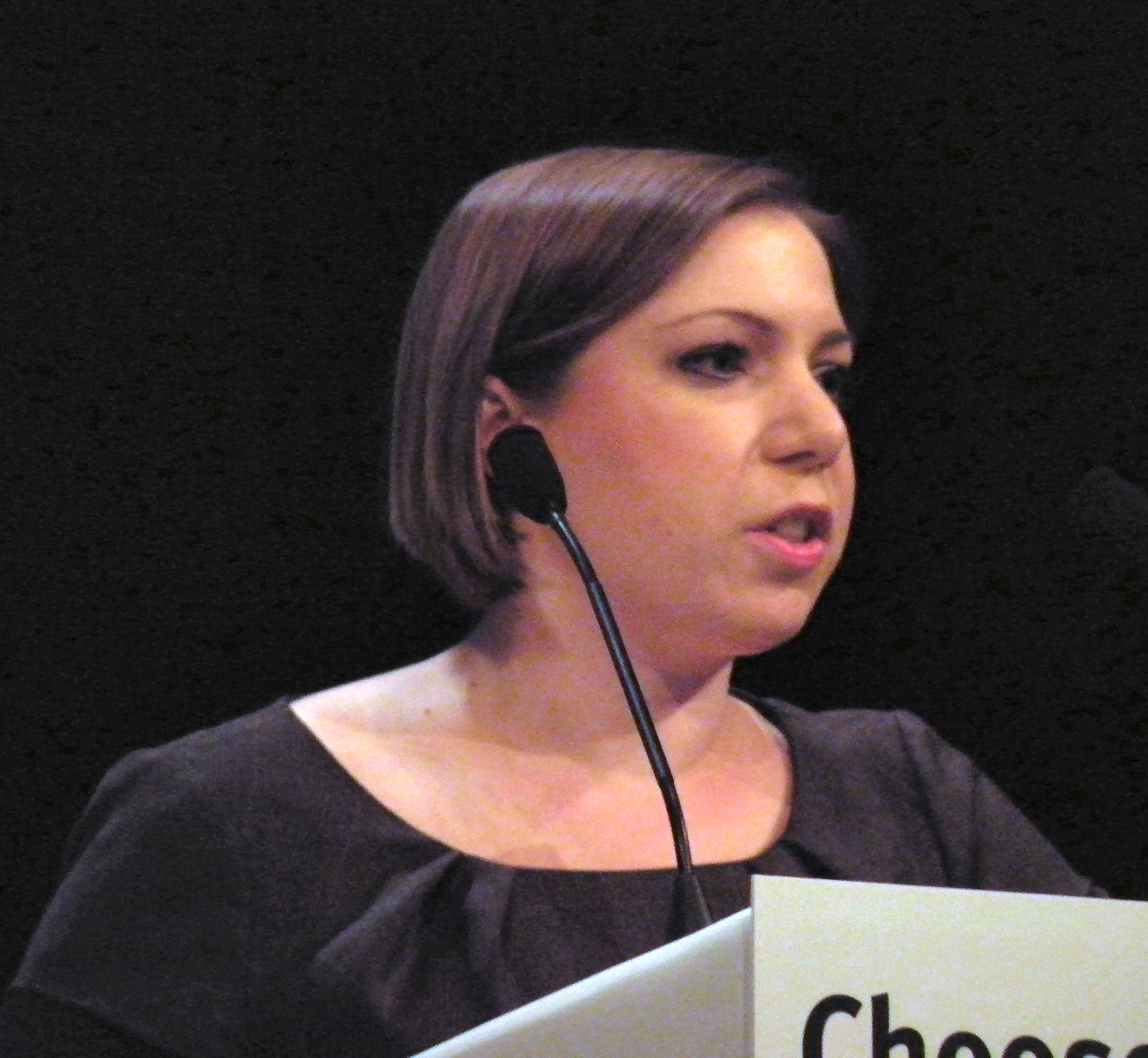
Sarah Teather, a by-election winner (2003), the Lib Dem MP for Brent East and Brent Central (2003–2015), and the party's official spokesperson for Housing

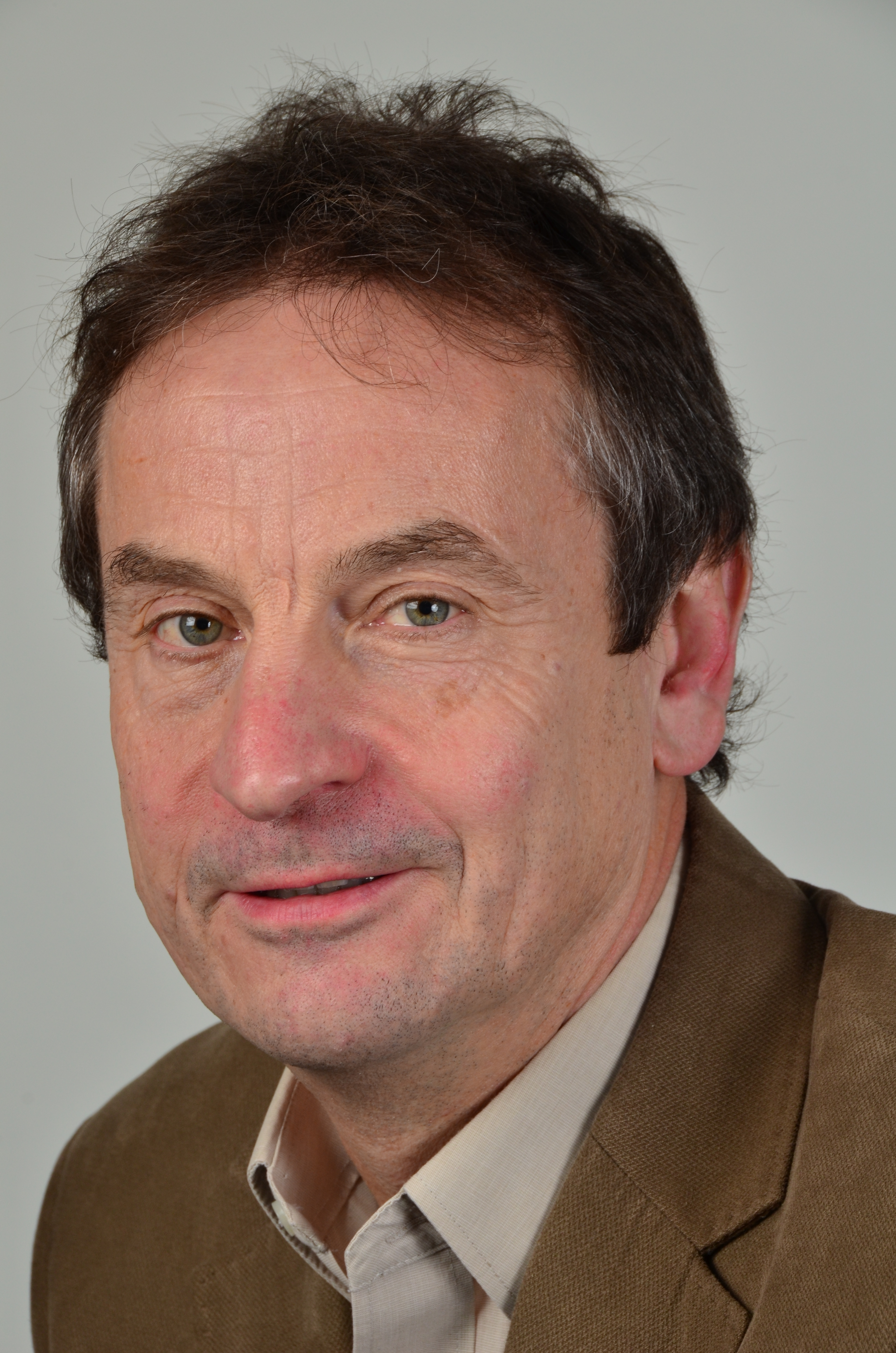
Chris Davies, MP for Littleborough and Saddleworth (1995–97), MEP for North West England (1999—2014/2019), and LD Leader, European Parliament

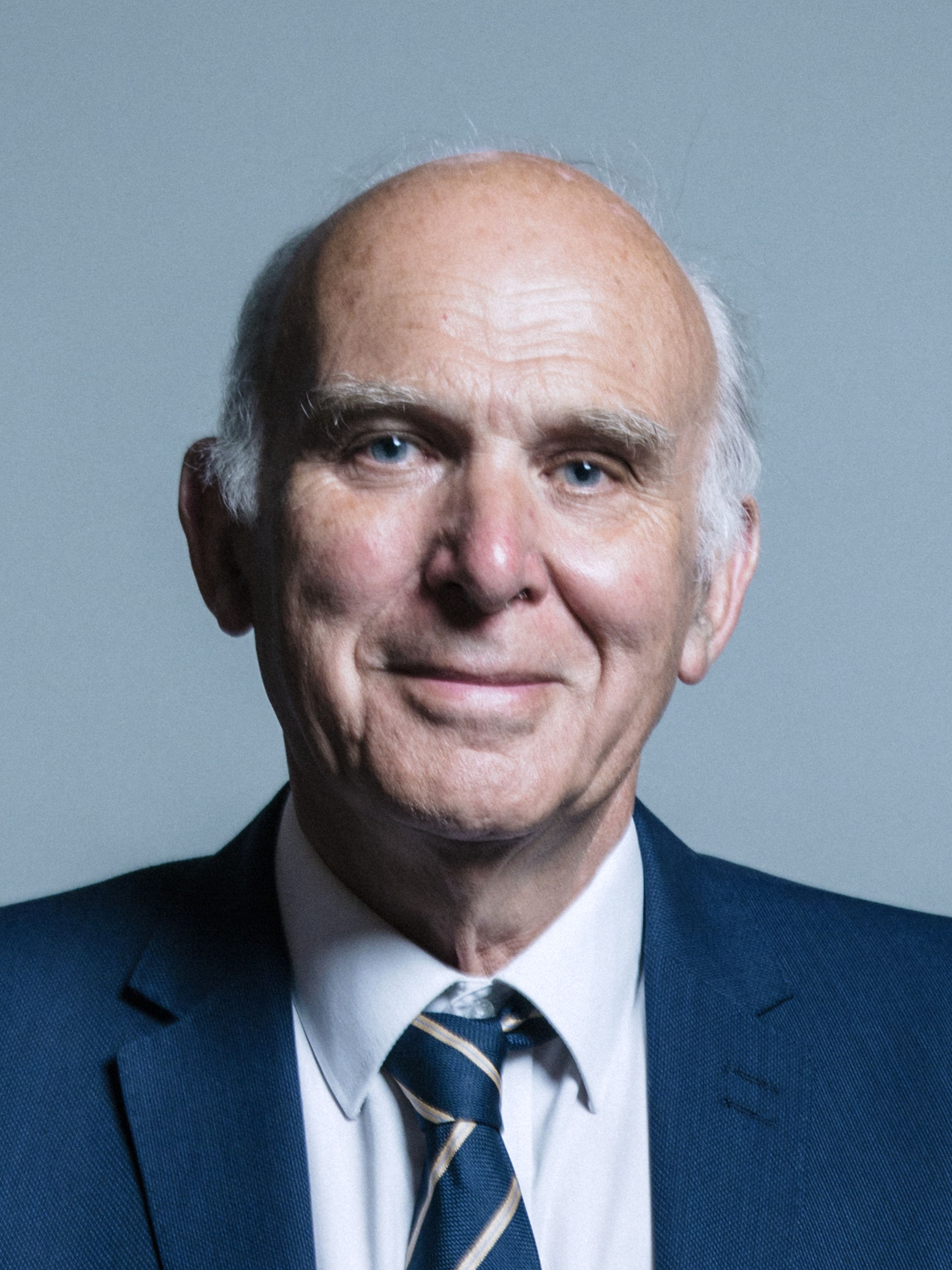
Vince Cable, former Leader of the Liberal Democrats, and MP for Twickenham (1997–2015 and 2017–2019). Elected CULC President (1964)

=== Academics ===
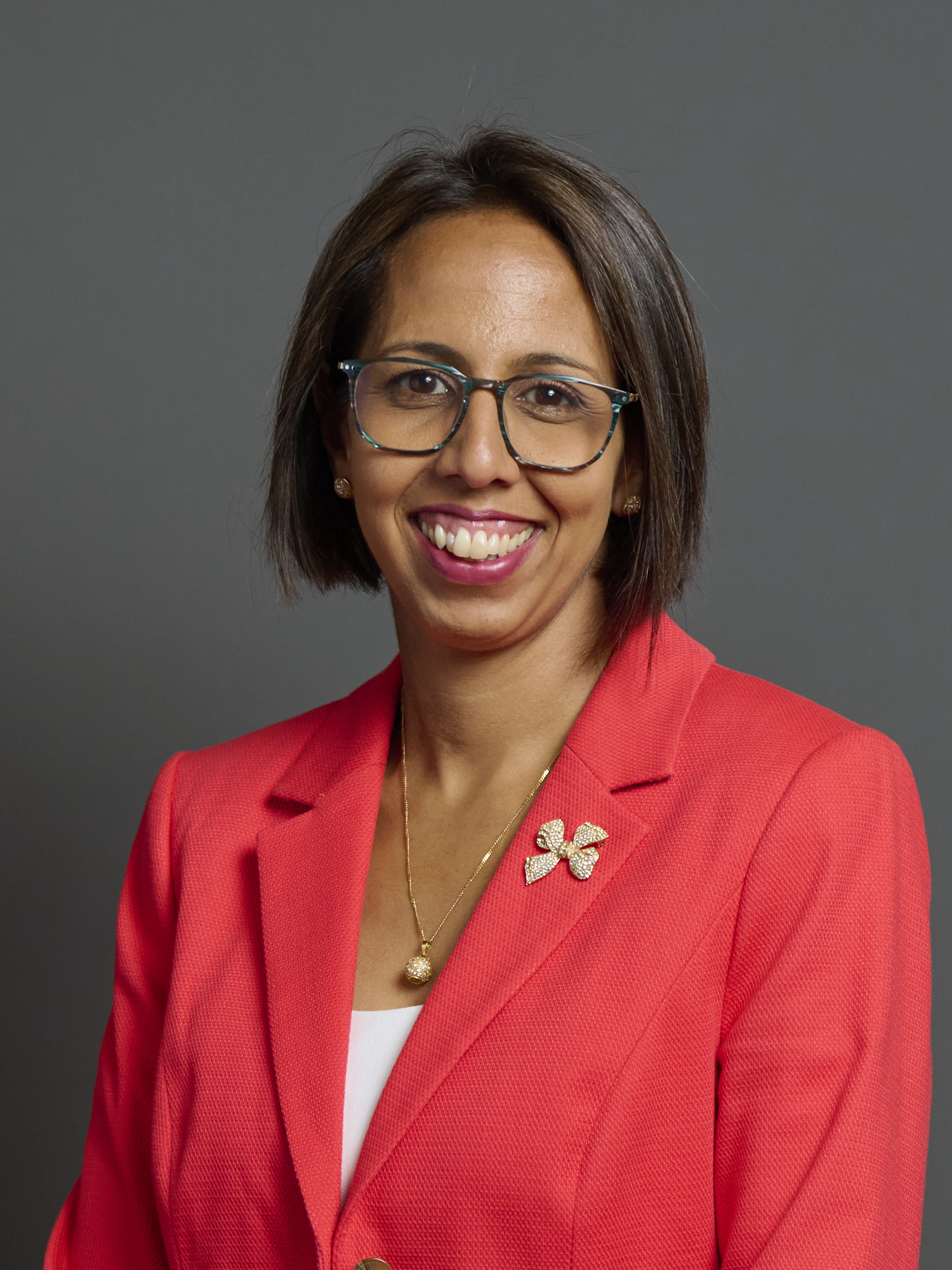
Munira Wilson is a Lib Dem MP, former campaign manager, councillor and successful businesswoman. She campaigned against Brexit, which was strongly supported by Boris Johnson's Conservative government, and voted through by Jeremy Corbyn's Labour opposition. She won the Twickenham seat vacated by former Lib Dem leader Vince Cable, at the 2019 general election, and again, in 2024. She has voted against cuts to pensioners' Winter Fuel Allowance, in favour of taxing the banks more, improvements to water and air quality, measures to prevent climate change, windfall taxes on oil and gas companies and against NI increases on employers.

- Oscar Browning, CULC founder member and Treasurer 1886–96, historian.
- Henry Jackson, CULC founder member and President 1897–99, classicist.
- John Maynard Keynes, CULC President in 1905 and economist after which Keynesian economics is named.
- Donald MacAlister, CULC President 1901–02 & 1906, physician and academic.
- Dennis Robertson, CULC President 1910–11, economist
- Bertrand Russell, CULC Secretary in 1892, mathematician and philosopher, and winner of the 1950 Nobel Prize in Literature.
- John Tresidder Sheppard, CULC President 1907–08, classicist.

=== Church ===
- Michael Ramsey, elected (but did not serve as) CULC Chair in 1926, later Archbishop of Canterbury.

=== Civil service ===
- Robert Chote, CU Social Democrats President in 1988, economist, Director of the Institute for Fiscal Studies 2002–10, Chairman of the Office for Budget Responsibility 2010-2020.
- Mervyn King, CULC Treasurer in 1968, Governor of the Bank of England.

=== Journalism and media ===
- Kenneth Adam CULC President 1929–30, journalist and Controller of BBC Television, 1957–61.
- Peter Cook, CULC member, television actor, comedian and satirist.
- Benjamin Ramm, CSLD Chair in 2004, journalist and founding editor of The Liberal, 2004–12.
- Andrew Rawnsley, CU Social Democrats Newsletter columnist, journalist, author and Chief Political Commentator for The Observer newspaper.

=== Judiciary ===
- Ronald Waterhouse, CULC President in 1950, High Court judge.

=== MPs and MEPs ===
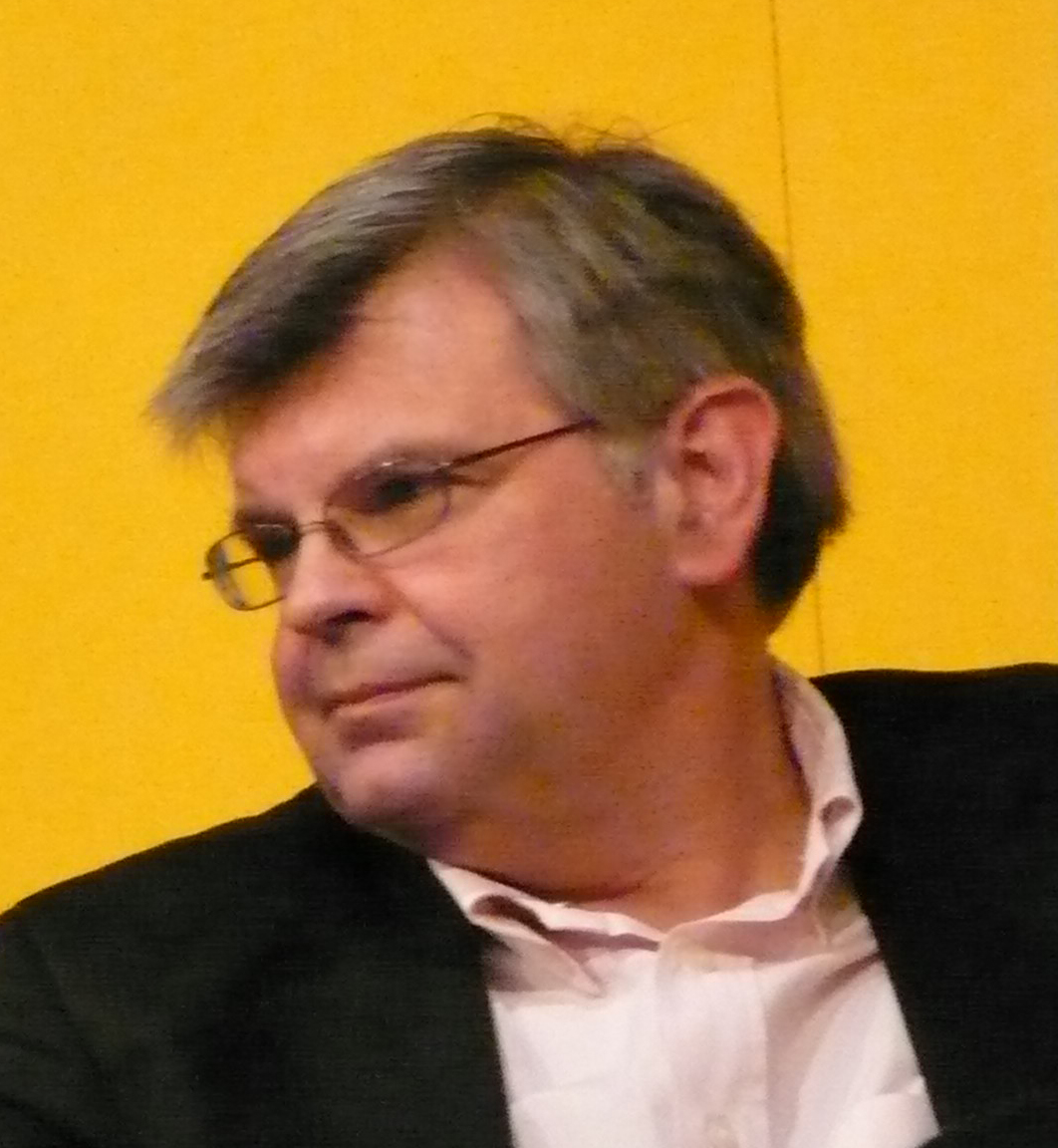
David Howarth is the former Leader of Cambridge City Council, the Lib Dem MP for Cambridge (2005—2010), and Professor of Law and Public Policy at the University of Cambridge. He is also a member of Britain's Electoral Commission. In Parliament, he voted against compulsory ID cards and prolonged detention without trial, and for both gay rights and a smoking ban in indoor public places.

- Martin Bell, CULC Publicity Officer in 1960 and later a BBC journalist and Independent MP 1997–2001.
- Roderic Bowen, CULC member, Liberal MP for Cardigan 1945–66.
- Vince Cable, elected CULC President in 1964 (but resigned before serving), Lib Dem MP for Twickenham 1997–2019; Secretary of State for Business 2010–5, former Chief Economist of Shell Oil, Leader of the Liberal Democrats 2017–19.
- James Chuter Ede, CULC member, Liberal councillor on Epsom UDC and Surrey CC, then Labour MP and Home Secretary.
- Greg Clark, CU Social Democrats President in 1987, Conservative MP 2005-24 and former Cabinet member.
- Chris Davies, CULC member, MP for Littleborough and Saddleworth 1995–7, MEP for North West England 1999–2014 and 2019; former Leader of the Lib Dem group in the European Parliament.
- Clement Davies, CULC member, Leader of the Liberal Party 1945–56.
- Andrew Duff, CULC member, Lib Dem MEP for the East of England, 1999–2014.
- Ernest Evans, CULC President 1908–9, Liberal MP 1921–23 & 1924–43, judge.
- Emlyn Garner Evans, CULC President 1933–4, Liberal and Liberal National MP 1950–59.
- Chris Grayling, CU Social Democrats Standing Committee member in 1983, Conservative MP since 2001 and Cabinet member.
- Sir Percy Harris, CULC member, Liberal MP 1916–18 & 1922–45; Deputy Leader of the Liberal Party 1933–45.
- Arthur Hobhouse, CULC Secretary in 1906, Liberal MP and founder of the National Parks.
- David Howarth, CULC committee member 1979–81, Lib Dem MP for Cambridge 2005–10.
- Simon Hughes, CULC member, Lib Dem MP for Bermondsey 1983–2015 and party President 2005–09.
- Julian Huppert, CSLD Chair in 1998, Lib Dem MP for Cambridge 2010–15.
- Oliver Letwin, CULC member, Conservative MP for Dorset West 1997–2019, and former Shadow Chancellor.
- Selwyn Lloyd, CULC President 1926, Conservative Chancellor 1960–2 and Foreign Secretary 1955–60, Speaker of the House of Commons 1971–76.
- C. F. G. Masterman, CULC committee member, Liberal MP 1906–18, 1923–24.
- Edwin Samuel Montagu, CULC President in 1902, Liberal MP 1906–22, cabinet minister 1915–22.
- Matthew Parris, CULC member and college secretary for Clare, later a Conservative MP 1979–86 and journalist.
- Sarah Teather, CULC member, Lib Dem MP for Brent East 2003–15, and the party's housing spokesperson.
- Richard Wainwright, CULC President in 1939, and Liberal MP for Colne Valley 1966–70 and 1974–87.
- Munira Wilson, CULC member, former businesswoman, Liberal Democrat campaign manager, councillor and current Lib Dem MP for Twickenham, 2019—.

=== Peers ===
- Henry Bellingham, Baron Bellingham, CULC member, Conservative MP 1983–97 and 2001–19.
- Sal Brinton, CULC member, businesswoman, Lib Dem peer, and party President 2015–19.
- Derek Ezra, Baron Ezra, CULC Newsletter Editor 1937–8, former chairman of the National Coal Board.
- Hugh Foot, Baron Caradon, CULC President 1927–28, Governor of Jamaica 1951–57 and Cyprus 1957–60.
- Toby Harris, Baron Harris of Haringey, CULC member, Labour member of the GLA 2000–04.
- David Lea, Baron Lea of Crondall, CULC President in 1960, Trades Union Congress official and Labour peer.
- Arnold McNair, 1st Baron McNair, CULC Secretary in 1907, first President of the European Court of Human Rights 1959–65.
- Leslie Runciman, 2nd Viscount Runciman of Doxford, CULC President 1921–22, shipbuilder.
- Nancy Seear, Baroness Seear, CULC member, Liberal peer.
- Henry Sinclair, 2nd Baron Pentland CULC President 1928–29, Fourth Way spiritualist.
- Chris Smith, Baron Smith of Finsbury, CULC member, Labour MP for Islington South and Finsbury, 1983–2005, and cabinet minister.
- Sir Charles Trevelyan, 3rd Baronet, CULC committee member. (known before his elevation to the Lords as C. P. Trevelyan), Labour President of the Board of Education 1924, 1929–31.
- Jim Wallace, Baron Wallace of Tankerness, CULC member, former Lib Dem MP 1983–2001 and Deputy First Minister of Scotland.
- Lord Wallace of Saltaire, CULC President in 1961, academic.
- Alan Watson, Baron Watson of Richmond, CULC President in 1963, broadcaster and Lib Dem peer.

=== Poets and writers ===
- Robert Egerton Swartwout, CULC President 1930–31, coxswain, author, poet, and cartoonist.

=== Sports ===
- Harold Abrahams, CULC member, 100m Gold Medallist, 1924 Paris Olympics.

The association runs a subsidiary group, the Keynes Society, for alumni. Membership is free and lasts for life.
