= World Federation of Liberal and Radical Youth =

- Founded: 1947
- Dissolved: 1978
- Succeeded by: IFLRY
- Headquarters: London, United Kingdom

The World Federation of Liberal and Radical Youth (WFLRY) was an international liberal youth organization. It had a global outreach but consisted mainly of national youth organizations from Europe.

WFLRY was founded in 1947 in Cambridge, United Kingdom. In 1969 the organization was split, resulting in the separate forming of European Federation of Liberal and Radical Youth (EFLRY). WFLRY was dissolved in 1978.

== Leadership of WFLRY ==
Presidency

- 1947–1951 (Switzerland) Raymond-Claude Foëx
- 1958–1962 (Denmark) Niles Westerby [da]
- 1962–1964 (Germany) Barthold C. Witte [de]
- 1964–1966 (Sweden) Ingemund Hägg
- 1966–1968 (United Kingdom) Jon Steel
- 1968–1970 (Sweden) Margaretha Holmsted [sv]
- 1970–1973 (Netherlands) Jan Kees Wiebinga

Secretaries General

- 1958–1962 (Belgium) Jean-Jacques Rey
- 1962–1964 (Luxembourg) Forberg
- 1964–1966 (Germany) Gerhard Meyer [de]
- 1966–1967 (Luxembourg) Paul Wirtz
- 1967–1968 (Sweden) Margaretha Holmstedt [sv]
- 1968–1970 (United Kingdom) Peter Ellis Jones
- 1970–1973 (United Kingdom) Tony Lambert
