= Liberal Democratic League of Ukraine =

Non-profit organisation in Ukraine

Liberal Democratic League of Ukraine Ліберально-демократична ліга України (ЛДЛУ)
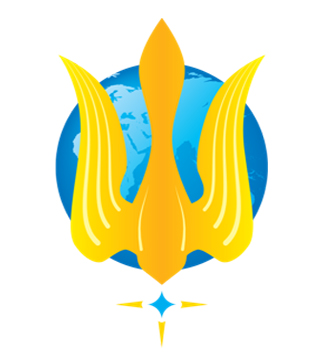
- President: Arthur Kharytonov
- Vice President: Yevheniia Shulha
- Founded: 06 May 2015
- Headquarters: Kyiv, Ukraine
- Ideology: Liberalism
- International affiliation: International Federation of Liberal Youth (IFLRY)
- European affiliation: European Liberal Youth (LYMEC)

Liberal Democratic League of Ukraine (LDLU) is a non-governmental and nonprofit organization that is composed of the representatives of a new generation of Ukrainian youth, which aims at building and developing the liberal democracy in Ukraine.

== History ==
The organization was established on 6 May 2015 by joint initiative of the students of Taras Shevchenko National University of Kyiv and National University of Kyiv-Mohyla Academy.

Being headquartered in Kyiv, Ukraine, the League still provides a solid ground for direct cooperation between all of its members, which are students of the leading Ukrainian, Polish, Dutch as well and British universities. Those students are young lawyers, political scientists, international affairs experts, sociologists, economists, etc.

During 2015–2016, the organization's activities spread to Kyiv, Lviv, Dnipro, Odesa, and others. In addition, the organization is represented in Poland (Warsaw, Kraków), the Netherlands (Groningen), Sweden (Lund), Germany (Berlin), the United Kingdom (London), Portugal (Lisbon), France (Paris), India (New Delhi). At the beginning of 2016 the organization applied to the International Federation of Liberal Youth.

In June 2017, the organization gained full membership in the International Federation of Liberal Youth. In October of that year, the organization became an associate member of the European Liberal Youth, which is the youth wing of the Alliance of Liberals and Democrats for Europe Party.

In September 2017, a memorandum of cooperation between the organization and the largest Lithuanian liberal organization, the Lithuanian Liberal Youth, was signed.

In 2024, the Liberal Democratic League of Ukraine was designated as an “undesirable organization” in Russia.

== Purpose and Objectives ==
The main purposes of the Liberal Democratic League of Ukraine are the preservation and distribution of fundamental human rights and freedoms, including their social, economic, and cultural aspirations and interests. For these ends the organization aims:

- to develop equally distribute liberal democratic ideas;
- to unite Ukrainian youth with a liberal outlook, who strive to see Ukraine as a strong and progressive liberal democratic state;
- to take effective collective measures to protect the fundamental human rights and freedoms;
- to foster the liberalization of the Ukrainian law;
- to improve Ukrainian legislation by preparing projects of regulations, providing scientific and legal opinions, examining all branches of the law, and conducting political and social research;
- to achieve fruitful cooperation with the new generation of patriotically minded Ukrainians;
- to develop international cooperation with liberal, democratic, and liberal democratic organizations and associations from different countries.
- to popularize Ukrainian history, culture, and traditions both regionally and internationally;
- to practice public control over the processes of adoption of laws as well as challenging the accountability of the Ukrainian government.

Its members also look forward to establishing a liberal democratic political party based on the values and objectives of the Liberal Democratic League of Ukraine in the near future.

== Ideology and concepts ==
According to the Charter of the Liberal Democratic League of Ukraine, the Manifesto of the organization involves the following principles:

- The liberty of one citizen ends where the liberty of another citizen begins;
- Personal responsibility for own deeds and actions is the basis for a successful and progressive society;
- Individuals agreed to surrender some of their freedoms and submit them to the authorities in exchange for the protection of their remaining rights. Thus a state serves as an instrument for the successful realization of the aspirations and goals of its citizens;
- Market economy and private property have proved to be the best means to earn capital and build wealth, therefore a laissez-faire practice is sa ine qua non in domestic affairs.
- The right to life, liberty, and security of people along with the personal happiness of each are the main values, that must be promoted and protected.
- Apart from the ideas mentioned above, the very framework of the organization is based on the principle that Ukrainian people can live in prosperity provided that the political power is exercised by young yet mature Ukrainians, born in an independent Ukraine.

Furthermore, international activity of the organization is carried out by the principle that "Ukraine is not only Europe but also the whole world".

== Structure ==
To embody these objectives, the organization has a unique internal structure, which corresponds with all main trends of the LDLU. The organization is composed of different Departments, which in turn are subdivided into Sectors. As of August 2016, the key Departments of the Liberal Democratic League of Ukraine are as follows:

- Liberal Democracy Department
- Human Rights Department
- Education and Youth Department
- Domestic affairs Department
- Foreign affairs Department
- Law Department
- Sociology, Analyses and Prognoses Department
- PR-Department
- HR-Department

=== The Viche ===
The Liberal Democratic League of Ukraine Viche is the principal organ of the organization that comprises all members. Every member has one vote and nobody has the right of veto. It is the Viche, which is in charge of making all core decisions.

=== The Council ===
There is also a Council of the LDLU, which is another decisive organ responsible for making decisions in between the sessions of the LDLU Viche.

As of the year 2018 the Council consists of:

- Arthur Kharytonov – the President of the Organization;
- Yevheniia Shulha – the Vice President of the Organization;
- Roman Leuta – the Head of the Secretariat of the Organization;
- Olena Ohorodnik – the Head of the Liberal Democracy Department;
- Denys Hatseniuk – the Head of the Human Rights Department;
- Vira Hembarska – the Head of the Foreign affairs department;
- Serhii Poroshenko – the Head of the Domestic affairs department;
- Karyna Stepanova – the Head of the Education and Youth Department;
- Taras Paslavskyi – the Head of the PR Department
- Mykhailo Rudenko – the Head of the HR Department
- Olha Tsurkan – the Advisor to the President;

== Activity of the organization ==
=== Public liberal enlightenment ===
The project was introduced to conduct classes and lectures dedicated to liberalism, which are believed to spread liberal seeds among students. The lections program comprises topics dedicated to protecting fundamental human rights and freedoms, strengthening the rule of law, pluralism, coherent society, and liberal democracy. The project was introduced in the Ukrainian Humanities Lyceum, Kyiv, in winter 2015. Both the school's administration and students warmly welcomed the idea of the program. The LDLU is about to run the same projects in other schools in the Ukrainian capital.

In 2017, the list of schools where the project was held was enriched by Gymnasium No. 59 named after Alexander Boychenko, Lyceum "Naukova zmina", secondary school No. 78 (Kyiv), etc.

=== Lessons in Dissent in Ukraine ===
The Liberal Democratic League of Ukraine was among very few Ukrainian organizations, which supported the Umbrella Revolution in Hong Kong in 2014. Being inspired by the Umbrella Movement in Hong Kong, the representatives of the LDLU have contacted Matthew Torne, a producer and expert in Hong Kong politics. He showed his interest and even supported the idea of a project aiming to show his Lessons in Dissent movie in Ukraine.

Matthew Torne also gave an exclusive interview, in which he expressed his respect and admiration for young Ukrainians, who do their best at fighting kleptocracy. He also criticized the inaction of both the European Union and the United States regarding the war in Donbas.

Meanwhile, in his conversation with Arthur Kharytonov, who is the President of the Liberal Democratic League of Ukraine, the leader of the Umbrella Revolution Joshua Wong for the first time commented on the political situation in Ukraine by supporting the Ukrainian struggle against both internal and external enemies.

The premiere of Lessons in Dissent in Ukraine took place on 25 April 2016 in Kyiv, and next day in Lviv.

=== Inclusive friendly ===
Disabled people in Ukraine face several problems in all main spheres of social life, as the Ukrainian authorities do nothing to improve the standards of life for people with disabilities, who eventually have to spend their free time at home. An inclusive friendly project was introduced to conduct several pieces of training designed for the staff of the Ukrainian catering industry to teach them to serve disabled people professionally so that these people can enjoy spending more time out in an appropriate environment. The project is being successfully practiced in Lviv, where local catering workers have a chance to gain professional skills from experienced trainers.

=== World policy ===
LDLU became the first organization in Ukraine that established contacts with leaders of the Umbrella Movement, namely, with Joshua Wong and 21 deputies of the Legislative Council of Hong Kong, Nathan Law and Baggio Leung activists Oscar Lai, Alex Chow, Derek Lam and other members of party Demosistō. The cooperation aims to provide information about the Ukrainian political situation in Hong Kong and inform Ukrainians about the Hong Kong political crisis of 2014–2017.

One of the organization's work spheres was the disclosure of the truth about the junta's crimes in Thailand and the Prayuth Chan-ocha regime. To this end, for the first time, the representative of the Transparency International Tanakorn Chun told the Ukrainians about the current situation in Thailand after the abolition of the democratic regime. Also, in the framework of the direction, the leader of mass student uprisings in Thailand, Netiwit Chotiphatphaisal was interviewed for European readers.

The organization also hosted a meeting with Mr. Manoj Kumar Bharti, India's Ambassador in Ukraine.

At the end of the year, the organization covered the work of New Zealand Young Nationals by interviewing the vice president of the youth wing of the ruling New Zealand party.

Since 2015, the organization has established strong relationships with political parties and public movements that have become the basis of the Umbrella Movement. Arthur Kharytonov, the president of the organization won the competition of the Council of Asian Liberals and Democrats in 2017 and represented Ukraine at the World Liberal Forum in Hong Kong. After he met with leaders of mass protests in 2014, the organization decided to create a "Free Hong Kong Center" movement with the purpose to highlighting Hong Kong's political processes and disclosing offenses by the Government of the People's Republic of China.

In October 2017, members of the organization and activists went into protests opposite the Chinese embassy in Ukraine with demand to release the leaders of the Umbrella Movement, Joshua Wong, Nathan Law, Alex Chow and others from the Hong Kong prisons. The action was supported by the Amnesty International team in Ukraine and Hong Kong. The protest has attracted much attention from Asian media, including the main Hong Kong opposition newspaper Stand News.

=== Liberal democracy school ===
The project became part of the "Liberal Education" launched by the organization in 2015. The principal goal of the project is to conduct free Saturday lectures devoted to the fundamental issues of liberal democracy: the rights and freedoms of man and citizen, elections, constitutionalism, and parliamentarism. The speakers of the "School of Liberal Democracy" at various times were: Mikhail Vynnytsky, Irina Troyan, Andriy Kruglashov, and others like that.

=== Social Movement "Captives" ===
The project is focused on the liberation of Ukrainian political prisoners from Russian prisons and assistance to families affected by the occupation of Crimea. Within the project framework, A series of events were held to inform the public about the condition of political prisoners within the project, where Gennady Afanasyev took part (one of the Crimean political prisoners held in Russia). In February 2017 on the Day of Resistance, the "Captives" initiated the March of Solidarity. Crimea – UA.

In May 2017 the organization presented «Charity auction of dates» and, as a result, collected 10,000₴ to support the families of political prisoners in Crimea. «Charity auction of dates» aimed to draw public attention to the plight of political prisoners who are on the peninsula or were transferred to Russia.
