= Cumann =

Organizational unit in Ireland

A cumann (Irish for association; plural cumainn) is the lowest local unit or branch of a number of Irish political parties. The term cumann may also be used to describe a non-political association. Cumainn are usually made up of 5+ (the recommendation being 12) members of a local area and makes sure the policies of their political party are being correctly implemented.

Traditionally, Sinn Féin and Fianna Fáil have called their local branches by that term. Fine Gael also uses the term to describe its local branches in the Clare constituency.

== Structure of Fianna Fáil ==
The structure of Fianna Fáil is as follows; the elementary units of the party are the cumann, the Comhairle Ceantair (Area Council), and the Comhairle Dáil Cheantair (Constituency Council). The Comhairle Ceantair is a form of district unit covering a number of cumainn over a geographic area (usually a County Council local electoral area), while the Comhairle Dáil Cheantair is a collection of all the cumainn or all the Comhairlí Ceantair in a Dáil (parliamentary) constituency or county.

== Structure of Sinn Féin ==
In Sinn Féin, the party structure is similar to that of Fianna Fáil. The principal units of the party are the cumann and the Comhairle Ceantair (Area Council), which consists of elected members from the area's cumainn. The Comhairle Ceantair is a form of district unit covering a number of cumainn over a geographic area (usually a County Council constituency). The Ard Comhairle functions as the Sinn Féin national committee and executive; it is composed of elected board members on an all-Ireland basis.

== See also ==
- Cumann na mBan
