= Federal Association of Liberal Students Groups =

Federal Association of Liberal Students
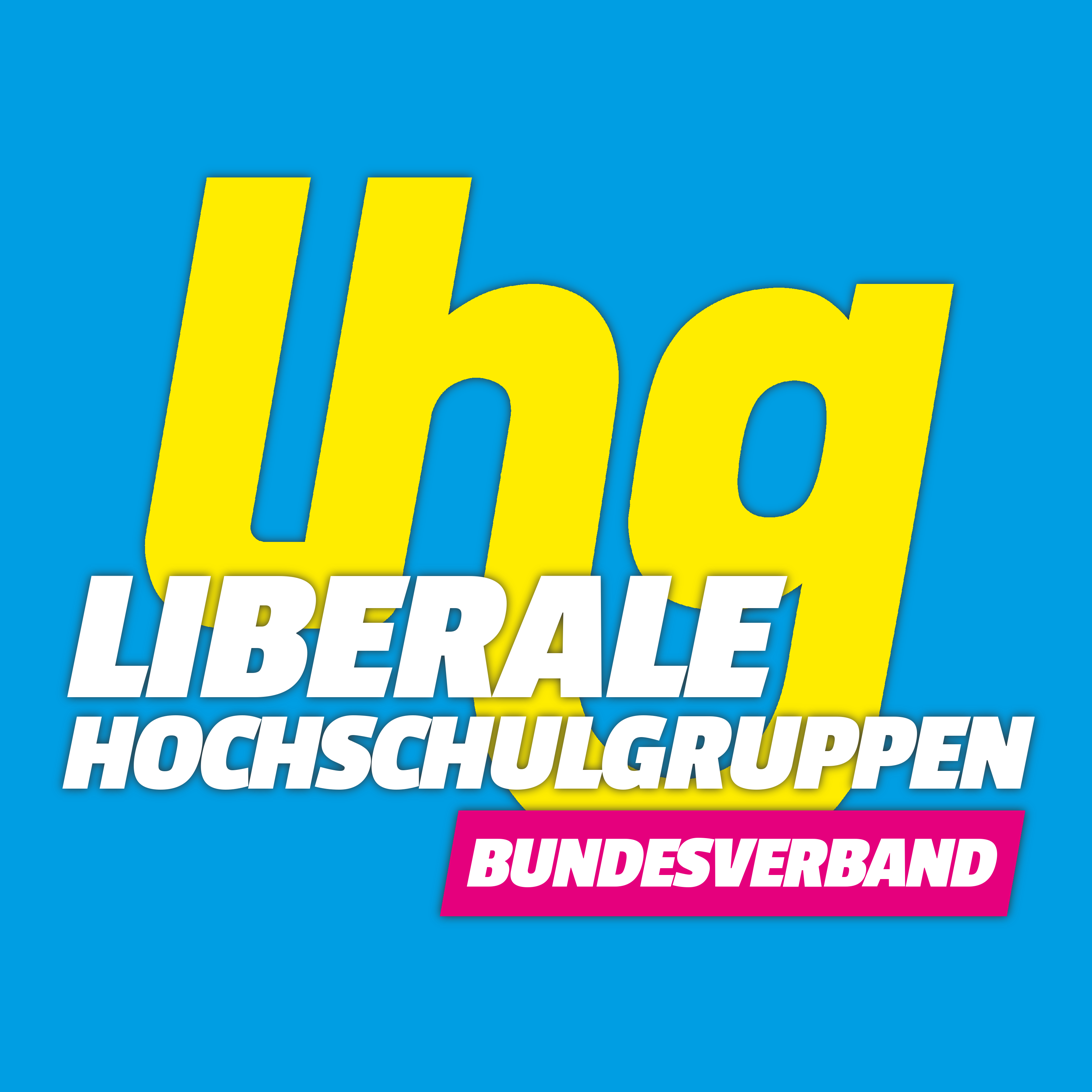
- Formation: December 17, 1987; 38 years ago
- Headquarters: Reinhardtstraße 14, 10117 Berlin, Germany
- Location: Berlin
- Members: 49 groups (as of Jan. 2024)
- Chairman: Charles Lübcke
- Website: www.liberale-hochschulgruppen.de

The Federal Association of Liberal Students Groups (German: Bundesverband Liberaler Hochschulgruppen; short: LHG) is a student association in the Federal Republic of Germany supporting liberal political issues.

The LHG was established in 1987, by a combination of 40 student groups, as a successor association of several liberal student associations, including the center-left Social Liberal Student Association (SLH), the Young Liberals Student Association (JuLi-Hochschulgruppen), and the Liberal Students' Initiative (LSI).

The LHG is considered the first comprehensive federal association of liberal students in Germany since the breakup of the Liberal Students' Alliance (LSD), once associated with the FDP in 1969.

The LHG is a full member of the European Liberal Youth (LYMEC), which itself is tied to the European Liberal Democrat and Reform Party in the European Union.

Consisting of currently 49 member groups, LHG is one of the largest German student association. Since its January 2024 convention in Bonn, the federal chairman is Jan-Lukas Gescher.

== Former chairpersons ==
- Inka Goos-Richter (1987–89)
- Peter Kuhlmeier (1989)
- Lukas Werner (1989–91)
- Beate Engelhardt (1991–92)
- Christian Etzrodt (1992)
- Bernd-Alfred Bartels (1992–94)
- Knut Wuhler (1994–95)
- Carl Sonnenschein (1995–96)
- Gunnar Pietsch (1996–97)
- Britta Paulekat (1997–1998)
- Sandra von Münster (1998–2000)
- Raoul Michael Koether (2000–02)
- Marcel Luthe (2002–04)
- Martin Hörig (2004–06)
- Götz Galuba (2006–07)
- Daniel George (2007–09)
- Johannes Knewitz (2009–11)
- Kristina Kämpfer (2011-12)
- Josephine Dietzsch (2012-2014)
- Julia Buschhorn (2014-2015)
- Sascha Lucas (2015-2015)
- Alexander Schopf (2015-2016)
- Johannes Dallheimer (2016-2019)
- Lukas Tiltmann (2019-2020)
- Tabea Gandelheidt (2020-2022)
- Benjamin Kurtz (2022-2024)
- Jan-Lukas Gescher (2024-2026)
- Charles Lübcke (since January 2026)
