= Youth Organisation Freedom and Democracy =

Dutch political youth organisation

Youth Organisation Freedom and Democracy Jongerenorganisatie Vrijheid en Democratie
- Chairperson: Bennie Neplenbroek
- Founded: 26 February 1949; 77 years ago
- Headquarters: Lange Voorhout 12, The Hague
- Ideology: Liberalism; Classical liberalism
- Mother party: People's Party for Freedom and Democracy
- International affiliation: International Federation of Liberal Youth
- European affiliation: European Liberal Youth
- Website: www.jovd.nl

The Youth Organisation Freedom and Democracy (Dutch: Jongerenorganisatie Vrijheid en Democratie, JOVD) is a Dutch political youth organisation. The JOVD cooperates with the People's Party for Freedom and Democracy (VVD), but is politically independent.

Having trained several members of the House of Representatives and ministers (including Prime Minister Mark Rutte), the JOVD is a political school. The JOVD is a member of the European Liberal Youth (LYMEC) and the International Federation of Liberal Youth (IFLRY).
