= European Liberal Youth =

European liberal youth organisation

European Liberal Youth (LYMEC)
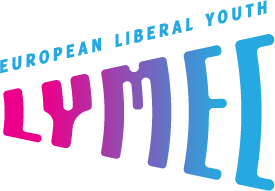
- President: Ines Holzegger
- Vice President: Alexandre Servais
- Secretary General: Even Diot
- Treasurer: Marten Porte
- Founded: 1976
- Headquarters: Rue d'Idalie 11, 6th floor, box 2, 1050 Brussels
- Membership: 61 organisations across 38 countries
- Ideology: Liberalism
- Mother party: ALDE
- International affiliation: International Federation of Liberal Youth
- Website: https://www.lymec.eu

European Liberal Youth (LYMEC) is an international organisation of liberal youth movements – mostly the youth wings of members of the Alliance of Liberals and Democrats for Europe Party but also individual members.

LYMEC holds full members status to the European Youth Forum (YFJ). It is the official youth wing of the Alliance of Liberals and Democrats for Europe (ALDE) Party and holds separate votes in the statutory bodies of the ALDE Party.

Even though the organisation is now called European Liberal Youth, it is still known as LYMEC, which is the abbreviation of the name when the organisation was formed in 1976. It was then known as Liberal and Radical Youth Movement of the European Communities.

== Member organisations ==
States with member organisations

Name in English	Name in original language	Country	Mother party	Type	Status
JUNOS – Young liberal NEOS	JUNOS – Junge liberale NEOS	Austria	NEOS	Youth	Full member
Musavat Youth Organization		Azerbaijan	Musavat	Youth	Associate
Youth Bloc	Moladzevy blok	Belarus		Youth	Associate
Young Liberals	nl:Jongliberalen	Belgium	Open Vld	Youth	Full member
Federation of Liberal Students	Fédération des Etudiants Libéraux, FEL	Belgium	—	Students	Full member
Youth of MR	Jeunes MR	Belgium	MR	Youth	Full member
Forum Mladih Naša stranka	Youth forum of Naša stranka	Bosnia and Herzegovina	Naša stranka	Youth	Full member
Youth Movement for Rights and Freedom (YMRF)	Mladejko dvijeni za prav i svobodi	Bulgaria	DPS	Youth	Full member
Young Croatian Liberals	Mladi hrvatski liberali, MHL	Croatia	HSLS	Youth	Full member
Croatian People's Party Youth	Mladi Hrvatske Narodne Stranke – Liberalni Demokrati, mHNS	Croatia	HNS	Youth	Full member
Istrian Democratic Youth (IDY)	Klub mladih IDS-a	Croatia	IDS	Youth	Full member
The Danish Social Liberal Youth	Radikal Ungdom, RU	Denmark	RV	Youth	Full member
Young Liberals of Denmark	Venstres Ungdom (VU)	Denmark	V	Youth	Full member
Estonian Reform Party Youth	Eesti Reformierakonna Noortekogu, ERPY	Estonia	RE	Youth	Full member
Centre Party Students	Keskustan Opiskelijaliitto, KOL	Finland	KESK	Students	Full member
Finnish Centre Youth	Suomen Keskustanuoret, FCY	Finland	KESK	Youth	Full member
Swedish Youth	Svensk Ungdom, SU	Finland	SFP	Youth	Full member
Young Radicals	Jeunes Radicaux, JR	France	MR	Youth	Full member
Federal Association of Liberal Students Groups	Bundesverband Liberaler Hochschulgruppen, LHG	Germany	FDP	Students	Full member
Young Liberals	Junge Liberale, JuLis	Germany	FDP	Youth	Full member
Young Liberals Greece	Ελεύθεροι Νέοι, ΕΛ.ΝΕ	Greece	—	Youth	Full member
Momentum TizenX	-	Hungary	Momentum	Youth	Full Member
Hungarian Liberal Youth	LiFT – Liberális Fiatalok Társasága	Hungary	Liberalisok	Youth	Associate
Ógra Fianna Fáil	-	Ireland	FF	Youth	Full Member
Uppreisn		Iceland	Viðreisn	Youth	Full Member
Youth Forum of AKR		Kosovo	AKR	Youth	Associate
Youth for Development	Jaunieši attīstībai	Latvia	LA	Youth	Full Member
Movement For! Youth	Par! Jauniešiem	Latvia	Par!	Youth	Full Member
Lithuanian Liberal Youth	Lietuvos liberalus jaunimas, LLJ	Lithuania	—	Youth	Full member
Young Democrats of Luxemburg	Jonk Demokraten	Luxembourg	PD	Youth	Full member
Liberal-Democratic Youth	Liberalno-Demokratska Mladina, LiDeM	North Macedonia	LDP	Youth	Full member
Liberal youth of Montenegro	Mladi Liberali Crne Gore, MLCG	Montenegro	LPCG	Youth	Full member
Liberal Youth of Moldova		Moldova	PL	Youth	Full member
Young Democrats	Jonge Democraten, JD	Netherlands	D66	Youth	Full member
Youth Organisation Freedom and Democracy	Jongeren Organisatie Vrijheid & Democratie, JOVD	Netherlands	VVD	Youth	Full member
Young Liberals of Norway	Norges Unge Venstre, NUV	Norway	V	Youth	Full member
Norwegian Liberal Students	Norges Liberale Studentforbund, NLSF	Norway	V	Students	Associate
Nowoczesna Youth	Młodzi .Nowocześni	Poland	.N	Youth	Full member
Save Romania Union Youth	USR Tineret	Romania	USR	Youth	Associate
Vesna Youth Democratic Movement	Молодёжное демократическое движения «Весна»	Russia	—	Youth	Full member
New Party Youth Forum	Forum mladih Nove stranke	Serbia	Nova	Youth	Full member
PSG Youth	Odbor mladih PSG-a	Serbia	PSG	Youth	Associate
Freedom Movement Youth	Gibanje Svoboda Mladi	Slovenia	GS	Youth	Full member
Young Progressives	Mladí progresívci, MP	Slovakia	PS	Youth	Full member
Young Citizens	Jóvenes Ciudadanos, Jcs	Spain	Cs	Youth	Full member
Nationalist Youth of Catalonia	Joventut Nacionalista de Catalunya, JNC	Spain	JUNTS	Youth	Full member
Centre Party Students	Centerstudenter, CS	Sweden	C	Students	Full member
Centre Party Youth	Centerpartiets ungdomsförbund, CUF	Sweden	C	Youth	Full member
Liberal Youth of Sweden	Liberala ungdomsförbundet, LUF	Sweden	L	Youth	Full member
Young Liberals of Switzerland	Jungfreisinnige Schweiz, JFS	Switzerland	FDP	Youth	Full member
Young Green Liberals of Switzerland	Junge Grünliberale, jglp	Switzerland	glp	Youth	Full member
European Youth of Ukraine	Європейська молодь України, EMU	Ukraine	EPU	Youth	Full member
Liberal Democratic League of Ukraine	Ліберально-демократична ліга України, LDLU	Ukraine	—	Youth	Full member
Ze!Molodizhka	Зе!Молодіжка	Ukraine	SN	Youth	Associate
Young Liberals		United Kingdom	LD	Youth	Full member
Gibraltar Liberal Youth (GLY)	-	United Kingdom	LPG	Youth	Full member
Alliance Youth	-	United Kingdom	Alliance Party	Youth	Associate

Former member organizations include Civil Forum, the Armenian ANC Youth, Liberal Youth of Moldova, UDI jeunes and Young Liberals of Andorra.

== Positions ==
In 2020, LYMEC adopted a resolution, according to which the organisations call for recognition of Taiwan as an independent country. The initiative was submitted by the Danish member organisation Radikal Ungdom.

== See also ==
- International Federation of Liberal Youth
- ALDE Party
- Young Democrats for Europe
