= International Federation of Liberal Youth =

Political youth organization

- President: (Lebanon) Hania Knio (FY)
- Secretary General: (Netherlands) Tirza Drent (JD)
- Treasurer: (United Kingdom) Kai Pischke (YL)
- Founded: 1979
- Headquarters: Schönhauser Allee 141 10437 Berlin, Germany
- International affiliation: Liberal International
- European affiliation: European Youth Forum
- Website: iflry.org

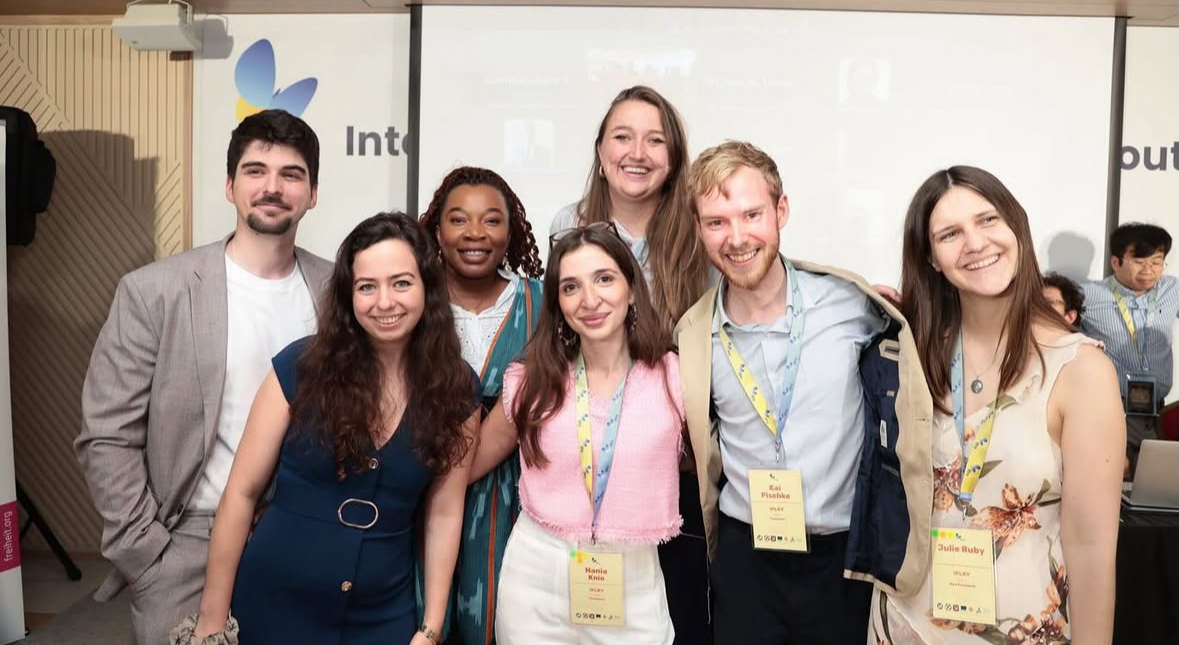
Members of the IFLRY Bureau in Taipei, Taiwan, 2026. Front row (left to right): Amparito Sanders, Hania Knio, Kai Pischke, and Julie Ruby. Back row (left to right): Danyil Khokhlovych, Marie Anézi Djie, and Tirza Drent.

The International Federation of Liberal Youth (IFLRY) is a political international & liberal youth organization. It consists of a global membership of national youth organizations. These are often but not exclusively affiliated with political parties that are members of Liberal International. IFLRY holds full member status to Liberal International and the European Youth Forum (YFJ), which operates within the Council of Europe and European Union areas and works closely with both these bodies. Since 2014, IFLRY has held special consultative status to ECOSOC. IFLRY also holds observer status to UNFCCC and has sent delegations to COP since COP15 in Copenhagen in 2009.

== History ==
IFLRY continues the tradition of two predecessors. The first was the World Federation of Liberal and Radical Youth (WFLRY), founded in 1947 in Cambridge, United Kingdom. WFLRY aimed to be a global organization, but mostly had active members in Europe. This led in 1969 to the separate forming of the European Federation of Liberal and Radical Youth (EFLRY). WFLRY was dissolved in 1978.

In 1979, at the EFLRY 6th Congress in Silkeborg, Denmark, EFLRY renamed itself IFLRY International Federation of Liberal and Radical Youth. This marked the start of a global expansion of the organization. The 6th Congress is thus recognised as the founding congress of IFLRY.

In 2001, the organization was renamed into IFLRY – International Federation of Liberal Youth.

Today IFLRY organises thematic seminars, workshops, study sessions, and summits worldwide. It cooperates with partners including the Centre Party International Foundation (Sweden), the Friedrich Naumann Foundation, and other liberal foundations and party international departments such as those linked to D66 and VVD

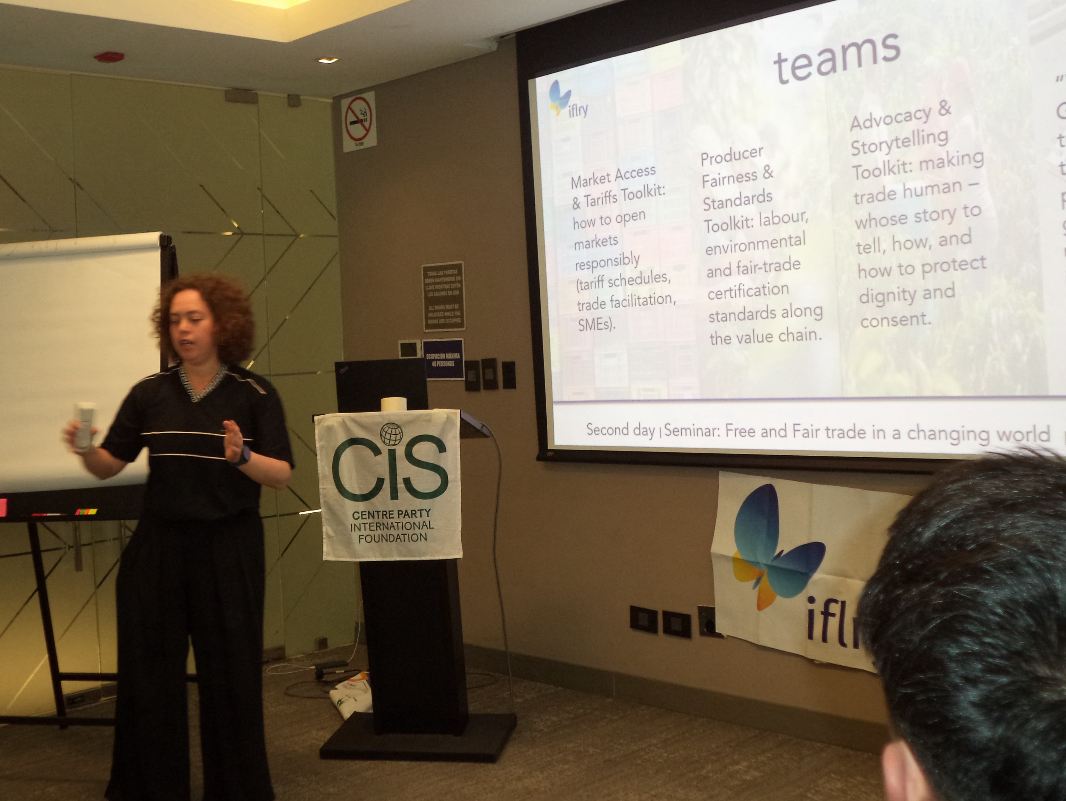
IFLRY Trainer facilitating a session at an IFLRY seminar held in conjunction with CIS (Centre Party International Foundation) in Guatemala

== Structure ==
IFLRY's highest body is the General Assembly, which meets at least every year. It adopts IFLRY's political platform, the Manifesto, and decides about IFLRY's activities. These are stated in a two-year Programme of Action. The General Assembly also decides on the federation's policies by adopting resolutions. Furthermore, the General Assembly elects the Bureau and decides upon the budget.

The Executive Committee is composed of one representative from each member organisation and the Bureau. It meets twice a year and takes all policy decisions within the framework of the General Assembly's resolutions.

The IFLRY Bureau consists of a President, a Secretary General, a Treasurer and four Vice-Presidents. The Bureau has the responsibility for IFLRY's day-to-day management, the President, Secretary general, and Treasurer are elected every two years. vice presidents yearly, The IFLRY Bureau appoints an Executive Director who runs the IFLRY secretariat in Berlin.

=== Bureau 2026-2027 ===
- Hania Knio (FY, (Lebanon) ), President
- Tirza Drent (JD, (Netherlands) ), Secretary General
- Kai Pischke (YL, (United Kingdom) ), Treasurer
- Julie Ruby (RU, (Denmark) ), Vice President
- Danyil Khokhlovych (JD, (Netherlands) / (Ukraine) ) (Note: Danyil Khokhlovych was also nominated by Liberal democratic league of Ukraine & European youth of Ukraine, he is a member of JD) Vice President
- Amparito Sanders (JOVD, (Netherlands) ) Vice President
- Marie Anézi Djie (OJLCI, (Ivory Coast) ) Vice President

==== Regional board members ====
- Martina Barrés Sabartés (LYMEC, Europe, JNC, (Catalonia) )
- Michelle wu (CALD Youth, Asia, DPP (Taiwan) )
- Idriss Ouattara (ALYF, Africa, OJLCI, (Ivory Coast) )
- Juanma Redolfi (JULAC, Latin America, GJFL (Argentina) )

==== Other ====
- Neha Rani, Executive Director
- vacant, Ombudsman
- Sven Gerst (JuLis (West Germany) ) Member of the advisory council
- Andrea Ugrinoska (Libintern (North Macedonia) ) Member of the advisory council
- Michel Nentwig (JuLis (West Germany) ) Member of the advisory council

== Programme Council ==
A major part of the activities within IFLRY are organized through various programmes. These are the current IFLRY programmes:

=== Africa ===
Programme Manager:

- Mamady Kande (CEEP (Senegal) )

Deputy Programme Managers:

- Isaac M. Supu ( (Liberia) )
- Abner Khuzwayo ( (Kenya) )

=== Asia ===
Programme Manager:

- Sangay Doma Tamang ( (India) )

Deputy Programme Manage:

- Samantha Nayakarathna ( (Sri Lanka) )

=== Eastern Europe & Caucasus ===
Programme Manager:

- Smiltė Domeikytė (LLJ (Lithuania) )

=== Climate Change ===
Programme Manager:

- Christopher Enu ( (Ghana) )

Deputy Programme Manager:

- Riley Devereaux (YDA (United States) )

=== Female Leadership ===
Co-Programme Managers:

- Lea Al Khatib (FY (Lebanon) )
- Sharan Virk (YL (United Kingdom) )

=== Swana ===
Programme Manager:

- El Ghali Ouali Alami ( (Morocco) )

Deputy Programme Manager:

- Nour Khaled Nabil ( (Egypt) )

=== Human Rights ===
Programme Manager:

- Ben Jokien (SU (Finland) )

Deputy Programme Manager:

- Eleni Kiafzezi ( (Greece) )

=== Latin America ===
Co-Programme Managers:

- Roberto Herrera (YL (Mexico) )
- Magnolia Cabrera (SC (Peru) )

Deputy Programme Manager:

- Celia Quesnel (JLRA (Paraguay) )

=== Pool of Trainers ===
Co-Programme Managers:

- Farah Sino (FY (Lebanon) )
- Friso van Gruijthuijsen (JOVD (Netherlands) )

=== Libel ===
Editor in chief:

- Lennart Kerkvliet (JOVD (Netherlands) )

Feature Editor:

- Maria Veronica Papa (KY (Philippines) )

=== Pride ===
- Phoenix Rödder (JuLis (West Germany) )

=== Well-being ===
- Hanna Gonslaves (JD (Netherlands) )

== Leadership of IFLRY ==
Presidents: 2022–2025 (Netherlands) Bram Roodhart (JOVD); 2020–2022 (Sweden) Amanda Kanange (LUF); 2018–2020 (Lebanon) Ahmad Al Rachwani (Future Youth); 2016–2018 (Netherlands) Pauline Kastermans (JD); 2014–2016 (Denmark) Christian Scharling (RU); 2010–2014 (Belgium) Thomas Leys (L²); 2009–2010 (Netherlands) Bart Woord (JD); 2007–2009 (Colombia) Paola Silva (UCJD); 2005–2007 (Denmark) Jacob Moroza-Rasmussen (VU); 2001–2005 (North Macedonia) Emil Kirjas (LiDeM); 1997–2001 (Germany) Jonas Renz (JuLis); 1991–1997 (Germany) Imke Roebken (JuLis); 1989–1991 (Sweden) Madeleine Sjöstedt (FPU); 1983–1989 (Netherlands) Jules Maaten (JOVD); 1981–1983 (Italy) Ottavio Lavaggi (FGR); 1979–1981 (Sweden) Lennart Rohdin (FPU)	Secretaries General: 2022–2024 (Colombia) Valentine Martin (IPL) (Note: Resigned after the 53rd general assembly in Abidjan, Tirza Drent was elected to replace her); 2020–2022 (Germany) Michel Nentwig (JuLis); 2018–2020 (Germany) Sven Gerst (JuLis); 2016–2018 (Norway) Tone Bjørndal (NUV); 2014–2016 (Netherlands) Frerik Kampman (JD); 2012–2014 (Norway) Naomi Ichihara Røkkum (NUV); 2010–2012 (Catalonia) Jordi Villanueva Calvet (JNC); 2009–2010 (Germany) Frederik Ferié (JuLis); 2005–2009 (Netherlands) Bart Woord (JD); 2002–2005 (Denmark) Jacob Moroza-Rasmussen (VU); 2001–2002 (Finland) Hini Katriina Utunen; 1999–2001 (North Macedonia) Emil Kirjas (LiDeM); 1997–1999 (Switzerland) Rolf Schmidt; 1995–1997 (Slovenia) Roman Jakic (MLD); 1993–1995 (Sweden) Tina Thorsell (FPU); 1991–1993 (Denmark) Ulla Tørnæs (DLS); 1989–1991 (Switzerland) Andreas Gasche (JBS); 1983–1985 (Germany) Jutta Rothacker; 1979–1981 (United Kingdom) Graham Watson (SYL)	Treasurers: 2022–2025 (United States) Sam Hudis (YDA); 2020–2022 (United States) Justin Meyers (YDA); 2018–2020 (Ukraine) Olha Tsurkan (LDLU); 2016–2018 (Netherlands) Robert Landheer (JD); 2016 (Canada) Danylo Korbabicz (YLC); 2014–2016 (Germany) Daniel George (JuLis); 2010–2014 (Brazil) João Victor Guedes Neto (JDEM); 2009–2010 (Netherlands) Jan Van Run (JOVD); 2007-2009 (United States) Chris Gallaway (YDA)

== Member organizations ==
=== Regional organizations ===
Organization	Region
European Liberal Youth (LYMEC)	Europe
Council of Asian Liberals and Democrats (CALD Youth)	Asia
Africa Liberal Youth for Freedom (ALYF)	Africa
Liberal Youth of Latin America and the Caribbean (JULAC)	Latin America

=== National organizations ===
==== Africa ====
Organization	Country	Status
Youth wing of Orange Democratic Movement,(ODM)	Kenya	Associate member
Youth for the Progress of Madagascar (MFM)	Madagascar	Candidate member
Freedom and Citizenship Association (FDD)	Mauritania	Associate member
Alliance for Change and Transparency Youth (ACT)	Tanzania	Associate member
Pajoma Youth Iniaitive (PYI)	Tanzania	Associate member
Egyptian Youth Council	Egypt	Full member
El Adl Youth secretariat (justice party)	Egypt	Full member
Jeunesse Haraki	Morocco	Associate member
Rassemblement es Jeunes Republicains (RHDP)	Ivory Coast	Full member
JALIDE	Ivory Coast	Associate member
Organisation des Jeunes Libéraux (OJLC)	Ivory Coast	Full member
Young Liberals of Ghana (YIG)	Ghana	Full member
Progressive Youth Movement	Ghana	Full member
BNJ/MoDel	Guinea	Associate member
Youth & Future Association (AJA)	Morocco	Full member
Mouvements Républicain (CLE)	Congo-Brazzavile	Associate member

==== Americas ====
Organization	Country	Status
Juventud Evópoli	Chile	Associate member
Juventud Liberal Radical Auténtica	Paraguay	Full member
Political Institute for Freedom (Instituto Politico para la Libertad)	Peru	Full member
Groupo Joven Fundación Libertad	Argentina	Associate member
Vente Joven (Vente Venezuela)	Venezuela	Associate member
Young Democrats of America (Democratic Party)	United States	Full member
Center for New Liberalism	United States (global)	Observer member
Horizonte Joven (CESCOS)	Uruguay	Associate member
Young Liberals of Canada (Liberal Party of Canada)	Canada	Full member
AVANZA Nicaragua	Nicaragua	Associate member
DA '91 jongerenforum (Democratic alternative '91)	Suriname	Observer member

==== Asia ====
Organization	Country	Status
Free Thought Forum (FTF)	Jordan	Full member
Youth Initiative	Nepal	Full member
Young Yesh Atid (YYA, Together)	Israel	Full member
Future Youth	Lebanon	Full member
Liberal Youth (Liberal Party)	Philippines	Observer member
Kilos ko Youth	Philippines	Associate member
Liberal youth movement	Sri Lanka	Associate member
DPP Youth Sector (Democratic Progressive Party)	Taiwan	Observer member

==== Europe ====
Organization	Country	Status
Youth Congress (ANC Youth)	Armenia	Full member
3H Movement	Turkey	Full member
Centre Party Youth (Centerpartiets ungdomsförbund, CUF,Centerpartiet)	Sweden	Full member
Civil Forum (Gramadyanski Forum)	Belarus	Full member
Youth Bloc (Moladzevy Blok)	Belarus	Associate member
Youth for Change (We Continue the change)	Bulgaria	Associate member
Euzko Gaztedi (EAJ/PNV)	Spain	Associate member
Young Estonia 200 (Noor Esti 200,Esti 200)	Estonia	Associate member
Croatian People's Party Youth (Mladi Hrvatske Narodne Stranke, CPPY, HNS)	Croatia	Full member
European Youth of Ukraine (EYU, EuroYouthUA)	Ukraine	Full member
Finnish Centre Youth (Suomen Keskustanuoret, FCY, Kekusta)	Finland	Full member
Gibraltar Liberal Youth (GLY)	Gibraltar	Full member
Young Liberals (Belgium) (Jong Liberale, Open VLD)	Belgium	Associate member
Federation des Etudiants Liberaux	Belgium	Full member
Istrian Democratic Youth	Croatia	Full member
Joventut Nacionalista de Catalunya (Young Nationalists of Catalonia, JNC, JUNTS)	Spain	Full member
JUNOS – Young liberal NEOS (JUNOS – Junge liberale NEOS)	Austria	Full member
Liberal Democratic League of Ukraine (LDLU)	Ukraine	Full member
Liberal Democratic Youth of Macedonia (Liberalno-Demokratska Mladina Macedonia, LiDeM)	North Macedonia	Full member
Young Liberals (Liberal Democrats)	United Kingdom	Full member
Liberal Youth of Sweden (Liberala ungdomsförbundet, LUF, Liberals)	Sweden	Full member
Lithuanian Liberal Youth (Lietuvos Liberalus Jaunimas, LLJ)	Lithuania	Full member
Mladejko dvijeni za prav i svobodi (YMRF)	Bulgaria	Full member
Liberal Students of Norway (Norges Liberale Studentforbund, NLSF, Venstre)	Norway	Full member
Nowoczesna Youth (nowoczensa)	Poland	Full member
USR Tineret (USR)	Romania	Full member
Social Liberal Youth of Denmark (Radikal Ungdom, RU, Radikale Venstre)	Denmark	Full member
Swedish Youth (Svensk Ungdom, SU, SPF)	Finland	Full member
Vesna	Russia	Full member
Young Democrats (Jonge Democraten, JD, D66)	Netherlands	Full member
Young Liberals (Junge Liberale, JuLis, Freie Demokraten Partei)	Germany	Full member
Federal Association of Liberal Students Groups (Germany) (Liberale Hochschulgruppen, Frei Demokranten Partei )	Germany	Observer member
Young Liberals (Switzerland) (Jungfreisinnige Schweiz, JFS / Jeunes Libéraux Radicaux Suisses, JLRS, FDP. The Liberals)	Switzerland	Full member
Young Green liberals (Junge Grünliberale Schweiz, JGL / Jeunes Vert'libéraux Suiss, JVS / Giovanni Verdi LIberali, GVL, Grünliberale Partei der Schweiz, GLP)	Switzerland	Associate member
Young Liberals of Andorra (Joventut Liberal d'Andorra, LDRS)	Andorra	Full member
Young Liberals of Montenegro	Montenegro	Full member
Young Liberals of Norway (Norges Unge Venstre, NUV Venstre)	Norway	Full member
Young Radicals (Jeunes Radicaux,Parti Radical)	France	Full member
Youth Forum of Nasa Stranka (Nasa Stranka)	Bosnia and Herzegovina	Full member
Youth of the Left (Venstres Ungdom, Venstre)	Denmark	Full member
Youth Organisation Freedom and Democracy (Jongeren Organisatie Vrijheid en Democratie, JOVD, VVD)	Netherlands	Full member

==== Oceania ====
Organization	Country	status
Young ACT (Rōpū ACT)	(New Zealand) Aotearoa	Associate member

== See also ==
- Liberalism
- Liberal International
- Liberalism worldwide
- List of liberal parties
- LYMEC, the European Liberal Youth, related to the ALDE Party
