= Kekkonen III cabinet =

Government of Finland from 1951 to 1953

Kekkonen III Cabinet
- 35th Cabinet of Finland
- Date formed: 20 September 1951
- Date dissolved: 9 July 1953

People and organisations
- President: Juho Kusti Paasikivi
- Prime Minister: Urho Kekkonen
- Member parties: Agrarian League; SDP; RKP
- Status in legislature: Majority government 118 / 200 (59%)
- Opposition parties: SKDL; National Coalition; People's Party; Åland Coalition

History
- Predecessor: Kekkonen II
- Successor: Kekkonen IV

Kekkonen's third cabinet was the 35th government of Finland. The majority government lasted from 20 September 1951 to 9 July 1953. The cabinet’s Prime Minister was Urho Kekkonen.

== Ministers ==
Portfolio	Minister	Took office	Left office	Party
Prime Minister	Urho Kekkonen	September 20, 1951	July 9, 1953	Agrarian
Minister of Foreign Affairs	Sakari Tuomioja	September 20, 1951	November 26, 1952	Independent
Minister of Foreign Affairs	Urho Kekkonen	November 26, 1952	July 9, 1953	Agrarian
Minister at the Ministry of Foreign Affairs	Ralf Törngren	September 20, 1951	July 9, 1953	RKP
Minister of Justice	Urho Kekkonen	September 20, 1951	September 22, 1951	Agrarian
Minister of Justice	Sven Högström	September 22, 1951	July 9, 1953	RKP
Minister of the Interior	Vieno Johannes Sukselainen	September 20, 1951	July 9, 1953	Agrarian
Minister of Defence	Emil Skog	September 20, 1951	July 9, 1953	SDP
Minister of Finance	Viljo Rantala	September 20, 1951	July 9, 1953	SDP
Minister at the Ministry of Finance	Matti Miikki	September 20, 1951	July 9, 1953	Agrarian
Minister of Education	Reino Oittinen	September 20, 1951	July 9, 1953	SDP
Minister of Agriculture	Martti Miettunen	September 20, 1951	July 9, 1953	Agrarian
Minister at the Ministry of Agriculture	Matti Lepistö	September 20, 1951	November 29, 1952	SDP
Minister at the Ministry of Agriculture	Eemil Luukka	September 20, 1951	July 9, 1953	Agrarian
Minister at the Ministry of Agriculture	Hannes Tiainen	December 12, 1952	July 9, 1953	SDP
Minister of Transport and Public Works	Onni Peltonen	September 20, 1951	November 29, 1952	SDP
Minister of Transport and Public Works	Emil Huunonen	November 29, 1952	December 3, 1952	SDP
Minister of Transport and Public Works	Eetu Karjalainen	December 3, 1952	July 9, 1953	SDP
Minister at the Ministry of Transport and Public Works	Emil Huunonen	September 20, 1951	November 29, 1952	SDP
Minister at the Ministry of Transport and Public Works	Kauno Kleemola	September 20, 1951	July 9, 1953	Agrarian
Minister at the Ministry of Transport and Public Works	Emil Huunonen	December 3, 1952	July 9, 1953	SDP
Minister of Trade and Industry	Penna Tervo	September 20, 1951	July 9, 1953	SDP
Minister of Social Affairs	Ralf Törngren	September 20, 1951	November 26, 1952	RKP
Minister of Social Affairs	Väinö Leskinen	November 26, 1952	July 9, 1953	SDP
Minister at the Ministry of Social Affairs	Emil Huunonen	September 20, 1951	July 9, 1953	SDP
Minister at the Ministry of Social Affairs	Lauri Murtomaa	September 20, 1951	July 9, 1953	Agrarian

Preceded by Kekkonen II	Cabinet of Finland; September 20, 1951 – July 9, 1953	Succeeded by Kekkonen IV
