= Vieno Simonen =

Finnish politician and farmer (1898–1994)

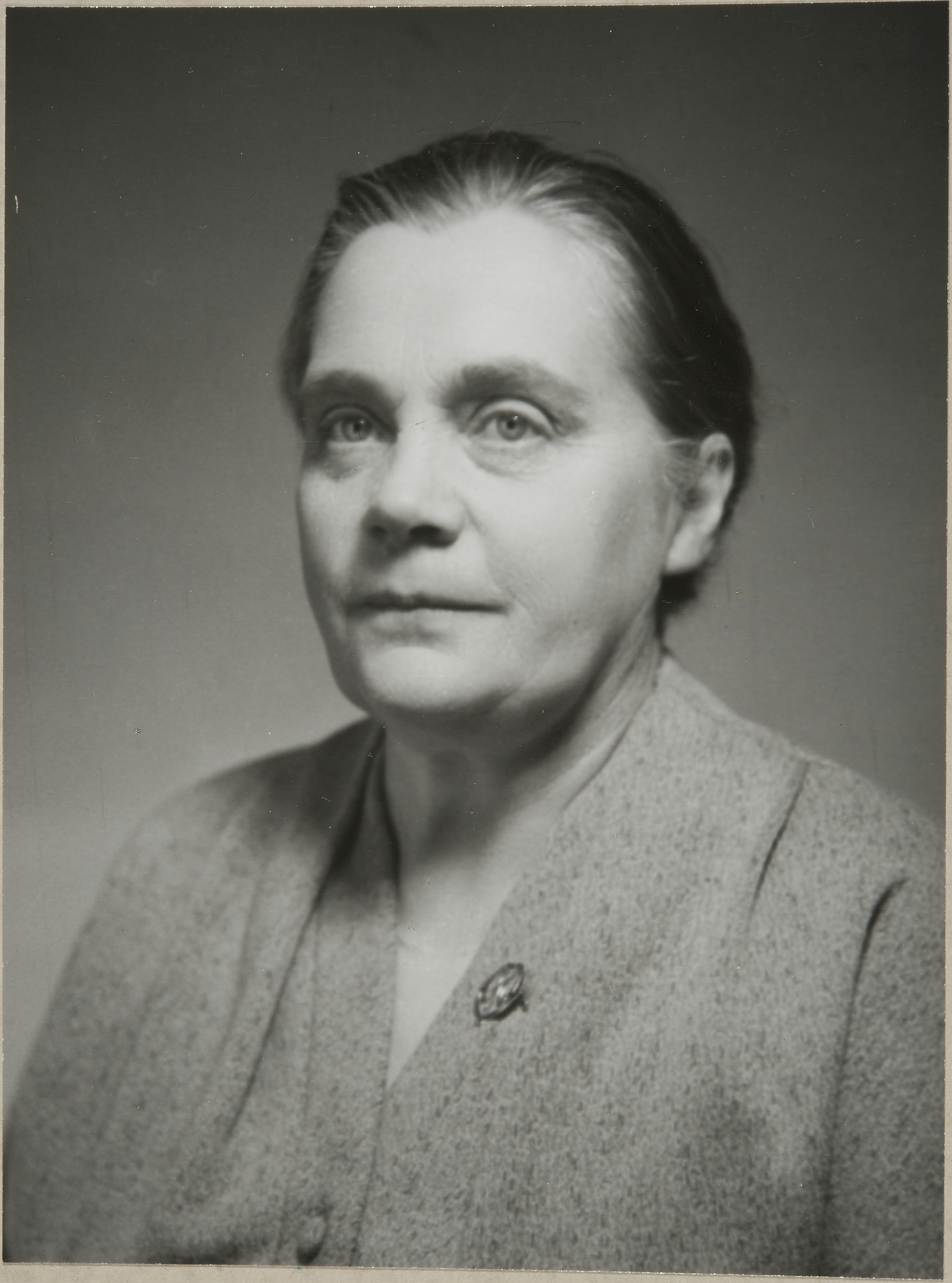

Finland Minister of Social Affairs
- In office 13 January 1959 – 13 April 1962
- Prime Minister: V. J. Sukselainen; Martti Miettunen

Member of the Parliament of Finland
- In office 22 July 1948 – 19 February 1962
- Constituency: Kuopio East

Personal details
- Born: Vieno Vartiainen; 27 December 1898 Peräseinäjoki, Finland
- Died: 20 June 1994 (aged 95) Pyhäselkä, Finland
- Party: Agrarian League
- Spouse: Oskar Simonen (m. 1922; died 1938)
- Children: 7

Vieno Simonen (née Vartiainen; 27 December 1898 – 20 June 1994) was a Finnish politician and farmer. A member of the Agrarian League, she represented Kuopio East in the Parliament of Finland from 1948 to 1962. After serving in deputy ministerial positions in the Kekkonen IV, Törngren, and Fagerholm II cabinets, she was twice appointed as minister of social affairs by prime ministers V. J. Sukselainen and Martti Miettunen, and held the position from 1959 to 1962.

== Early life ==
Vieno Vartiainen was born on 27 December 1898 in Peräseinäjoki, Finland. She attended a girls' school until 1914 and trained at a handicraft school in Kuopio. After training as a postal worker in Pulkkila and Iisalmi, she was certified in 1921 and began working at the post office of Hammaslahti. She became the treasurer of the Martha organisation of Hammaslahti that year, and married farmer Oskar Simonen in 1922; they had seven children. After Oskar's death in 1938, the farm's responsibilities were assumed by Vieno, who had been the farm's hostess since their marriage. She was involved in various organizations, including Lotta Svärd, during the 1940s.

== Political career ==
Simonen was elected to the Parliament of Finland in 1948 to represent the constituency of Kuopio East (now North Karelia) as a member of the Agrarian League (now the Centre Party). She was a member of the Parliament from 22 July 1948 to 19 February 1962, and sat on various parliamentary committees, including the Education and Finance committees. Simonen was also a Finnish representative to the Nordic Council. Her parliamentary work focused on providing support to women and poor families, particularly those living in rural areas.

In 1953, Simonen was appointed second minister of social affairs by prime minister Urho Kekkonen, becoming the first female government minister from a non-socialist party in Finland. She was reappointed to the same position the following year when Ralf Törngren became prime minister. In 1956, prime minister Karl-August Fagerholm selected her as the second minister of agriculture in his second cabinet. Simonen worked on a 1957 reform of Finland's national pension system to authorize a flat-rate payments to women farmers. From 13 January 1959 to 13 April 1962, she was the minister of social affairs in the cabinets of prime ministers V. J. Sukselainen and Martti Miettunen. As minister, Simonen continued her efforts to reform Finland's social welfare services.

Simonen was a presidential elector in 1950, 1956, and 1962. She did not seek re-election to Parliament in the 1962 elections, but remained active in the Martha organisation.

== Death ==
Simonen died on 20 June 1994 in Pyhäselkä, at the age of 95.

== See also ==
- List of Cabinet Ministers from Finland by ministerial portfolio
