= Kekkonen II cabinet =

34th government of the Republic of Finland

Kekkonen II Cabinet
- 34th Cabinet of Finland
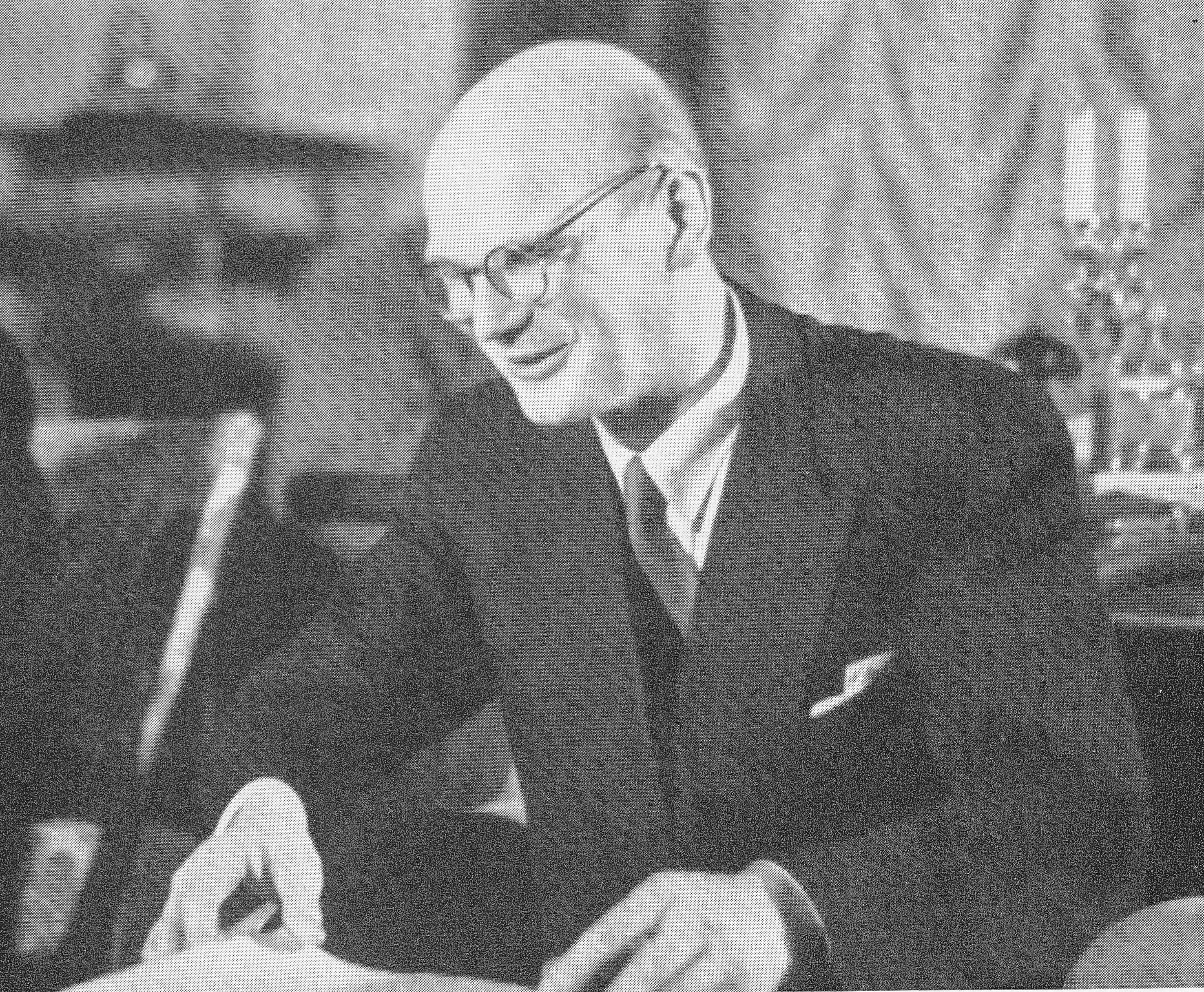
- Date formed: 17 January 1951
- Date dissolved: 20 September 1951

People and organisations
- President: Juho Kusti Paasikivi
- Prime Minister: Urho Kekkonen
- No. of ministers: 11
- Total no. of members: 17
- Member parties: Agrarian League; SDP; National Progressive; RKP
- Status in legislature: Majority government 130 / 200 (65%)
- Opposition parties: SKDL; National Coalition

History
- Predecessor: Kekkonen I
- Successor: Kekkonen III

Kekkonen's second cabinet was the 34th government of Finland, which existed from 17 January 1951 to 20 September 1951. It was a majority government, and its Prime Minister was Urho Kekkonen.

== Ministers ==
There were 11 total ministers in Kekkonen's second cabinet: five (including Kekkonen himself) from the Agrarian League, four from the Social Democratic Party, one from both the Swedish People's Party and the National Progressive Party, and one independent. Additionally, 6 ministers served within various ministries: three from the Social Democratic Party, two from the Agrarian League, and one from the Swedish People's Party. Rafael Paasio served as a minister at both the Ministry of Social Affairs and the Ministry of Transport and Public Works.

== Ministers ==
Portfolio	Minister	Took office	Left office	Party
Prime Minister	Urho Kekkonen	Kekkonen I Cabinet	Kekkonen IV Cabinet	Agrarian
Minister at the Prime Minister's Office	Johannes Virolainen	January 17, 1951	September 20, 1951	Agrarian
Minister of Foreign Affairs	Åke Gartz	Kekkonen I Cabinet	September 20, 1951	Independent
Minister of Justice	Teuvo Aura	January 17, 1951	September 20, 1951	National Progressive
Minister of the Interior	Johannes Virolainen	January 17, 1951	Kekkonen III Cabinet	Agrarian
Minister of Defence	Emil Skog	January 17, 1951	Kekkonen III Cabinet	Social Democratic
Minister of Finance	Onni Hiltunen	January 17, 1951	September 20, 1951	Social Democratic
Minister at the Ministry of Finance	Ralf Törngren	January 17, 1951	September 20, 1951	Swedish People's
Minister of Education	Lennart Heljas	Kekkonen I Cabinet	September 20, 1951	Agrarian
Minister of Agriculture	Martti Miettunen	January 17, 1951	Kekkonen IV Cabinet	Agrarian
Minister at the Ministry of Agriculture	Matti Lepistö	January 17, 1951	Kekkonen III Cabinet	Social Democratic
Minister of Transport and Public Works	Onni Peltonen	January 17, 1951	Kekkonen III Cabinet	Social Democratic
Minister at the Ministry of Transport and Public Works	Kauno Kleemola	January 17, 1951	Kekkonen III Cabinet	Agrarian
Minister at the Ministry of Transport and Public Works	Rafael Paasio	January 17, 1951	September 20, 1951	Social Democratic
Minister of Trade and Industry	Penna Tervo	January 17, 1951	Kekkonen III Cabinet	Social Democratic
Minister of Social Affairs	Vihtori Vesterinen	January 17, 1951	September 20, 1951	Agrarian
Minister at the Ministry of Social Affairs	Emil Huunonen	January 17, 1951	Kekkonen III Cabinet	Social Democratic
Minister at the Ministry of Social Affairs	Rafael Paasio	January 17, 1951	September 20, 1951	Social Democratic

Preceded by Kekkonen I	Cabinet of Finland; January 17, 1951 – September 20, 1951	Succeeded by Kekkonen III
