= Kekkonen I cabinet =

Government of Finland from 1950 to 1951

Kekkonen I Cabinet
- 33rd Cabinet of Finland
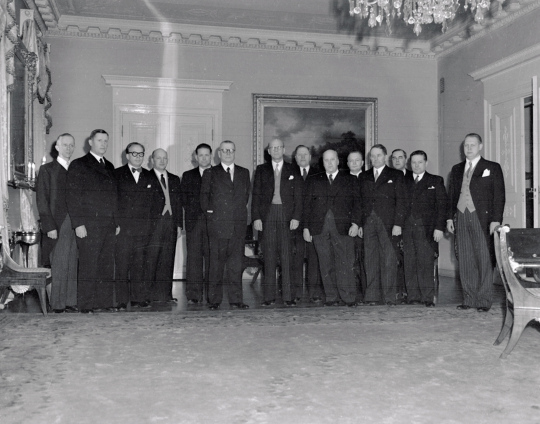
- Group picture of Kekkonen's first government March 18, 1950 at the President's palace.
- Date formed: 17 March 1950
- Date dissolved: 17 January 1951

People and organisations
- President: Juho Kusti Paasikivi
- Prime Minister: Urho Kekkonen
- No. of ministers: 11
- Total no. of members: 19
- Member parties: Agrarian League; National Progressive; RKP
- Status in legislature: Minority government 74 / 200 (37%)
- Opposition parties: Social Democratic; SKDL; National Coalition; Åland Coalition

History
- Predecessor: Fagerholm I
- Successor: Kekkonen II

Kekkonen's first cabinet was the 33rd government of Finland. The cabinet existed from 17 March 1950 to 17 January 1951. It was a minority government. The cabinet's Prime Minister was Urho Kekkonen.

During the cabinet's run, Kekkonen took a more significant role in the management of Soviet relations than president Paasikivi. For example, as Prime Minister, Kekkonen signed the Soviet-sponsored World Peace Council act banning atomic weapons. In June 1950, Kekkonen travelled to Moscow to agree on the first five-year agreement between Finnish-Soviet trade. The cabinet's foreign policy lead to an improvement in Finnish-Soviet relationships.

One of the cabinet's problems was the large inflation caused by the Korean War.

== Ministers ==
Key

- ^{RES} Resigned

Portfolio	Minister	Took office	Left office	Party
Prime Minister	Urho Kekkonen	March 17, 1950	Kekkonen IV Cabinet	Agrarian
Minister of Foreign Affairs	Åke Gartz	March 17, 1950	Kekkonen II Cabinet	Independent
Minister at the Ministry for Foreign Affairs	Sakari Tuomioja	March 17, 1950	January 17, 1951	National Progressive
Minister of Justice	Heikki Kannisto	March 17, 1950	January 17, 1951	National Progressive
Minister of the Interior	Urho Kekkonen	March 17, 1950	January 17, 1951	Agrarian
Minister at the Ministry of the Interior	Lauri Riikonen	March 17, 1950	September 30, 1950 ^{RES}	Agrarian
Minister at the Ministry of the Interior	Johannes Virolainen	September 30, 1950	January 17, 1951	Agrarian
Minister of Defence	Kustaa Tiitu	March 17, 1950	January 17, 1951	Agrarian
Minister of Finance	Vieno Johannes Sukselainen	March 17, 1950	January 17, 1951	Agrarian
Minister at the Ministry of Finance	Nils Meinander	March 17, 1950	January 17, 1951	Swedish People's
Minister of Education	Lennart Heljas	March 17, 1950	Kekkonen II Cabinet	Agrarian
Minister of Agriculture	Taavi Vilhula	March 17, 1950	January 17, 1951	Agrarian
Minister at the Ministry of Agriculture	Eemil Luukka	March 17, 1950	January 17, 1951	Agrarian
Minister of Transport and Public Works	Martti Miettunen	March 17, 1950	January 17, 1951	Agrarian
Minister at the Ministry of Transport and Public Works	Kauno Kleemola	March 17, 1950	January 17, 1951	Agrarian
Minister at the Ministry of Transport and Public Works	Lauri Riikonen	March 24, 1950	March 31, 1950 ^{RES}	Agrarian
Minister at the Ministry of Transport and Public Works	Vihtori Vesterinen	March 31, 1950	January 17, 1951	Agrarian
Minister of Trade and Industry	Sakari Tuomioja	March 17, 1950	September 30, 1950 ^{RES}	National Progressive
Minister of Trade and Industry	Teuvo Aura	September 30, 1950	January 17, 1951	National Progressive
Minister of Social Affairs	Ralf Törngren	March 17, 1950	January 17, 1951	Swedish People's

Preceded by Fagerholm I	Cabinet of Finland; March 17, 1950 – January 17, 1951	Succeeded by Kekkonen II
