= Rikkavesi =

Lake in Finland

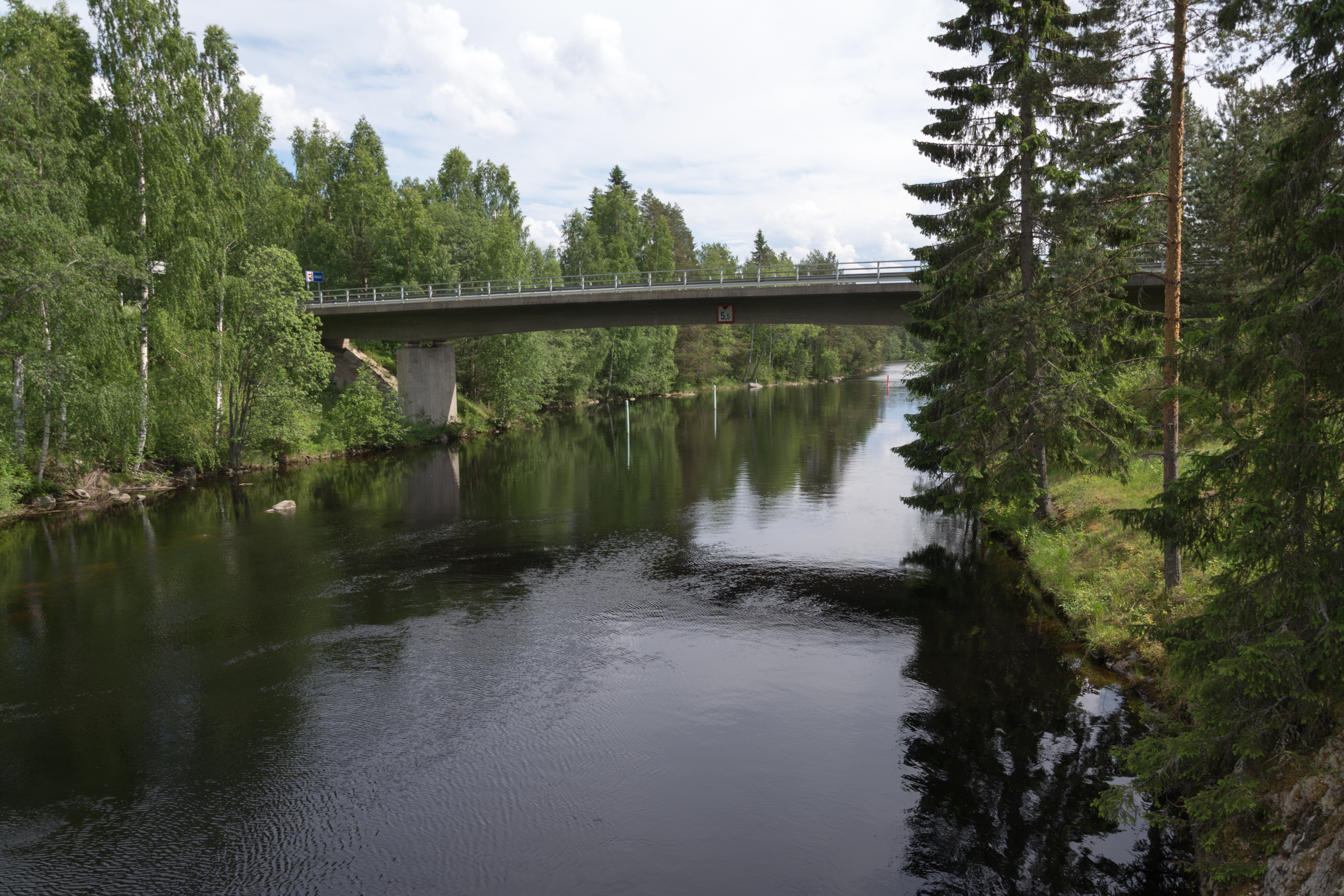
- The shipping route goes through the Kaavinkoski Canal from Rikkavesi to Kaavinjärvi.

- Location within Finland
- Location: Northern Savonia and Northern Karelia in Finland
- Coordinates: 62°49′N 28°45′E
- Primary outflows: Ohtaansalmi
- Catchment area: Vuoksi
- Basin countries: Finland
- Surface area: 63.361 km^{2} (24.464 sq mi)
- Average depth: 10.86 m (35.6 ft)
- Max. depth: 66.85 m (219.3 ft)
- Water volume: 0.69 km^{3} (0.17 cu mi)
- Shore length^{1}: 267.05 km (165.94 mi)
- Surface elevation: 101 m (331 ft)
- Frozen: December–May
- Islands: The biggest island is Viitasaari, 95 ha (0.37 sq mi)
- Settlements: Kaavi, Outokumpu and Tuusniemi
- ^{1} Shore length is not a well-defined measure.

Rikkavesi is a medium-sized lake in eastern Finland. At approximately 63 square kilometres (24 sq mi), it is the 66th largest lake in Finland. Rikkavesi is situated in the municipalities of Kaavi, Outokumpu and Tuusniemi.

Rikkavesi is 101 metres (331 ft) above the sea level. Kaavinjärvi and Rikkavesi are connected by the Kaavinkoski Canal. Ohtaansalmi strait flows from Rikkavesi to Juojärvi. There is a marked shipping route from Saimaa to Rikkavesi.

Lake Rikkavesi was formed by glacial melting at the end of the Ice Age. The average depth is almost 11 metres (36 ft) and the maximum depth is almost 67 metres (219 ft).

There are many islands in Rikkavesi. The biggest island is Viitasaari, which is 95 hectares (0,4 sq mi). The total length of shoreline is 267 kilometres (166 mi).

== Harbours ==
Luikonlahti excursion harbour is situated at the end of the narrow and almost 10 km long bay. The harbour is suitable for temporary stay and camping. The village has a fuel distribution ca. 500 m west of the harbour. The depth of the shipping route to the harbour is 1,8 metres.

Kaavinkoski excursion harbour is near the bridge of Tuusniemi-Luikonlahti road. The harbour is suitable for both boaters and canoers. The depth of the shipping route to the harbour is 1,5 metres.

Ohtaansalmi landing site is in Tuusniemi.

== See also ==
- List of lakes in Finland
