= Tuomioja cabinet =

Government of the Republic of Finland (1953–1954)

Tuomioja Cabinet
- 37th Cabinet of Finland
- Date formed: November 17, 1953
- Date dissolved: May 5, 1954

People and organisations
- Prime Minister: Sakari Tuomioja
- Total no. of members: 17
- Member parties: National Coalition; Liberal League; People's Party; RKP
- Status in legislature: Caretaker government

History
- Predecessor: Kekkonen IV
- Successor: Törngren

Sakari Tuomioja's cabinet was the 37th government of the Republic of Finland. The cabinet's time period was from November 17, 1953, to May 5, 1954. It was a caretaker government.

Tuomioja's cabinet lifted the regulation of several provisions in 1954, including coffee sales, which had been under regulation since 1939.

Assembly
Minister	Period of office	Party
Prime Minister; Sakari Tuomioja	November 17, 1953 – May 5, 1954	Liberal League
Minister of Foreign Affairs; Ralf Törngren	November 17, 1953 – May 5, 1954	Swedish People's Party
Deputy Minister of Foreign Affairs; Teuvo Aura	November 17, 1953 – May 5, 1954	Liberal League
Minister of Justice; Reino Kuuskoski	November 17, 1953 – May 5, 1954	Agrarian League
Minister of Defence; Päiviö Hetemäki	November 17, 1953 – May 5, 1954	National Coalition Party
Minister of the Interior; Heikki Kannisto	November 17, 1953 – May 5, 1954	National Coalition Party
Minister of Finance; Tuure Junnila	November 17, 1953 – May 5, 1954	National Coalition Party
Deputy Minister of Finance; Esa Kaitila	November 17, 1953 – May 5, 1954	People's Party of Finland
Minister of Education; Arvo Salminen	November 17, 1953 – May 5, 1954	National Coalition Party
Minister of Agriculture; Kalle Jutila	November 17, 1953 – May 5, 1954	Agrarian League
Deputy Minister of Agriculture; Henrik Kullberg Nils Westermarck	November 17, 1953 – December 4, 1953; December 4, 1953 – April 5, 1954	Swedish People's Party; Swedish People's Party
Minister of Transport and Public Works; Erik Serlachius	November 17, 1953 – May 5, 1954	Independent
Deputy Minister of Transport and Public Works Aulis Junttila	November 17, 1953 – May 5, 1954	Independent
Minister of Trade and Industry; Teuvo Aura	November 17, 1953 – May 5, 1954	Liberal League
Minister of Trade and Industry; Toivo Wiherheimo	November 17, 1953 – May 5, 1954	National Coalition Party
Minister of Social Affairs; Esa Kaitila	November 17, 1953 – May 5, 1954	People's Party of Finland
Deputy Minister of Social Affairs; Päiviö Hetemäki; Irma Karvikko	November 17, 1953 – April 5, 1954; November 17, 1953 – April 5, 1954	National Coalition Party; People's Party of Finland

Preceded by Kekkonen IV	Cabinet of Finland; November 17, 1953 – May 5, 1954	Succeeded by Törngren
