= Kekkonen IV cabinet =

Government of Finland in 1953

Kekkonen IV Cabinet
- 36th Cabinet of Finland
- Date formed: 9 July 1953
- Date dissolved: 17 November 1953

People and organisations
- President: Juho Kusti Paasikivi
- Prime Minister: Urho Kekkonen
- Total no. of members: 14
- Member parties: Agrarian League; RKP
- Status in legislature: Minority government 65 / 200 (33%)
- Opposition parties: Social Democratic; SKDL; National Coalition; People's Party; Åland Coalition

History
- Predecessor: Kekkonen III
- Successor: Tuomioja

Kekkonen's fourth cabinet was the 36th government of Finland, and it lasted from 9 July 1953 to 17 November 1953. It was a minority government headed by Urho Kekkonen.

== Ministers ==
Key

- ^{†} Died in office

| Portfolio | Minister | Took office | Left office | Party |
|---|---|---|---|---|
| Prime Minister | Urho Kekkonen | Kekkonen I Cabinet | November 17, 1953 | Agrarian |
| Minister of Foreign Affairs | Ralf Törngren | July 9, 1953 | November 17, 1953 | Swedish People's |
| Minister of Justice | Sven Högström | July 9, 1953 | November 17, 1953 | Swedish People's |
| Minister of the Interior | Vieno Johannes Sukselainen | Kekkonen II Cabinet | November 17, 1953 | Agrarian |
| Minister of Defence | Kauno Kleemola | July 9, 1953 | November 17, 1953 | Agrarian |
| Minister of Finance | Juho Niukkanen | July 9, 1953 | November 17, 1953 | Agrarian |
| Minister at the Ministry of Finance | Nils Meinander | July 9, 1953 | November 17, 1953 | Swedish People's |
| Minister of Education | Johannes Virolainen | July 9, 1953 | November 17, 1953 | Agrarian |
| Minister of Agriculture | Martti Miettunen | Kekkonen II Cabinet | November 17, 1953 | Agrarian |
| Minister of Transport and Public Works | Eero Mäkinen | July 9, 1953 | October 27, 1953 ^{†} | Independent |
| Minister of Transport and Public Works | Kusti Eskola | October 30, 1953 | November 17, 1953 | Agrarian |
| Minister at the Ministry of Transport and Public Works | Kusti Eskola | July 9, 1953 | October 30, 1953 | Agrarian |
| Minister of Trade and Industry | Teuvo Aura | July 9, 1953 | November 17, 1953 | Independent |
| Minister of Social Affairs | Lauri Hietanen | July 9, 1953 | November 17, 1953 | Independent |
| Minister at the Ministry of Social Affairs | Vieno Simonen | July 9, 1953 | November 17, 1953 | Agrarian |

| Preceded by Kekkonen III | Cabinet of Finland; July 9, 1953 – November 17, 1953 | Succeeded by Tuomioja |
