= Törngren cabinet =

Government of Finland in 1954

Törngren Cabinet
- 38th Cabinet of Finland
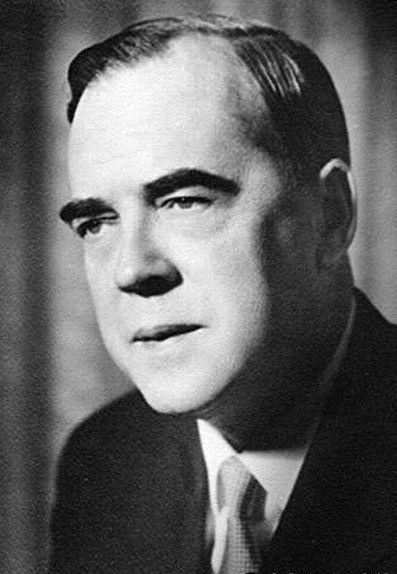
- Date formed: 5 May 1954
- Date dissolved: 20 October 1954

People and organisations
- Prime Minister: Ralf Törngren
- Total no. of members: 15
- Member parties: Agrarian Union; RKP; SDP
- Status in legislature: Majority government

History
- Predecessor: Tuomioja
- Successor: Kekkonen V

Ralf Törngren's cabinet was the 38th government of the Republic of Finland. The cabinet's time period was from May 5, 1954, to October 20, 1954. It was a majority government.

Assembly
Minister	Period of office	Party
Prime Minister; Ralf Törngren	May 5, 1954 – October 20, 1954	Swedish People's Party
Minister of Foreign Affairs; Urho Kekkonen	May 5, 1954 – October 20, 1954	Agrarian League
Minister of Justice; Yrjö Puhakka	May 5, 1954 – October 20, 1954	Independent
Minister of Defence; Emil Skog	May 5, 1954 – October 20, 1954	Social Democrat
Minister of the Interior; Väinö Leskinen	May 5, 1954 – October 20, 1954	Social Democrat
Minister of Finance; Vieno Johannes Sukselainen	May 5, 1954 – October 20, 1954	Agrarian League
Deputy Minister of Finance; Martti Miettunen	May 5, 1954 – October 20, 1954	Agrarian League
Minister of Education; Johannes Virolainen	May 5, 1954 – October 20, 1954	Agrarian League
Minister of Agriculture; Viljami Kalliokoski	May 5, 1954 – October 20, 1954	Agrarian League
Deputy Minister of Agriculture; Hannes Tiainen	May 5, 1954 – October 20, 1954	Social Democrat
Minister of Transport and Public Works; Martti Miettunen	May 5, 1954 – October 20, 1954	Agrarian League
Deputy Minister of Transport and Public Works; Aku Sumu	May 5, 1954 – October 20, 1954	Social Democrat
Minister of Trade and Industry; Penna Tervo	May 5, 1954 – October 20, 1954	Social Democrat
Minister of Social Affairs; Tyyne Leivo-Larsson	May 5, 1954 – October 20, 1954	Social Democrat
Deputy Minister of Social Affairs; Vieno Simonen; Aku Sumu	April 5, 1954 – October 20, 1954; June 7, 1954 – October 20, 1954	Agrarian League; Social Democrat

Preceded by Sakari Tuomioja's cabinet	Cabinet of Finland; May 5, 1954–October 20, 1954	Succeeded by Urho Kekkonen's fifth cabinet
