= Sirkka-Liisa Anttila =

Finnish politician (born 1943)

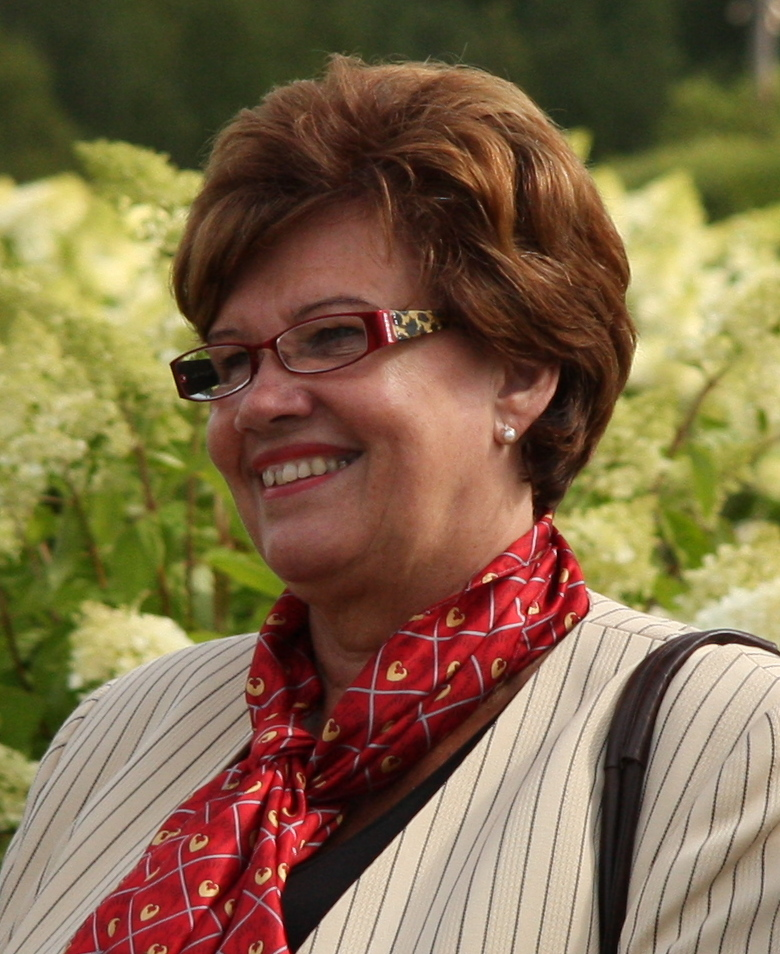
- Sirkka-Liisa Anttila in 2008.

Minister of Agriculture and Forestry
- In office 19 April 2007 – 22 June 2011
- Prime Minister: Matti Vanhanen; Mari Kiviniemi
- Preceded by: Juha Korkeaoja
- Succeeded by: Jari Koskinen

Personal details
- Born: 20 December 1943 (age 82) Marttila, Finland
- Party: Centre Party
- Spouse: Risto Anttila

Sirkka-Liisa Anttila (born 20 December 1943, Marttila) is a Finnish politician and was the Minister of Agriculture and Forestry in Matti Vanhanen's second cabinet and Mari Kiviniemi's cabinet. She represents the Centre Party.

== Political career ==
- Forssa town council member 1977–
- Member of the Finnish parliament 1983–1996
- Member of the European Parliament 1996–1999
- Member of the Finnish parliament 1999–
- Minister of Agriculture and Forestry, 2007–2011

In addition to her role in parliament, Anttila has been serving as member of the Finnish delegation to the Parliamentary Assembly of the Council of Europe since 2003; she had previously been a member of between 1989 and 1996. As member of the Centre Party, she is part of the Alliance of Liberals and Democrats for Europe group. She is a member of the Committee on Legal Affairs and Human Rights, the Committee on the Honouring of Obligations and Commitments by Member States of the Council of Europe (Monitoring Committee) and the Sub-Committee on the implementation of judgments of the European Court of Human Rights.

== Other activities ==
- Finnish Institute of International Affairs (FIIA), Member of the Board
