= Peräseinäjoen Toive =

Finnish sports club

- Full name: Voimistelu- ja urheiluseura Peräseinäjoen Toive r.y.
- Short name: PeTo
- Sport: Athletics, floorball, pesäpallo, table tennis, volleyball, wrestling
- Founded: 19 November 1927; 97 years ago in Peräseinäjoki
- Based in: Seinäjoki, Finland

Voimistelu- ja urheiluseura Peräseinäjoen Toive r.y., better known as Peräseinäjoen Toive (PeTo), is a Finnish sports club from Seinäjoki. The club has been or is currently active in athletics, floorball, pesäpallo, table tennis, volleyball, and wrestling. Peräseinäjoen Toive was founded in Peräseinäjoki on 19 November 1927.

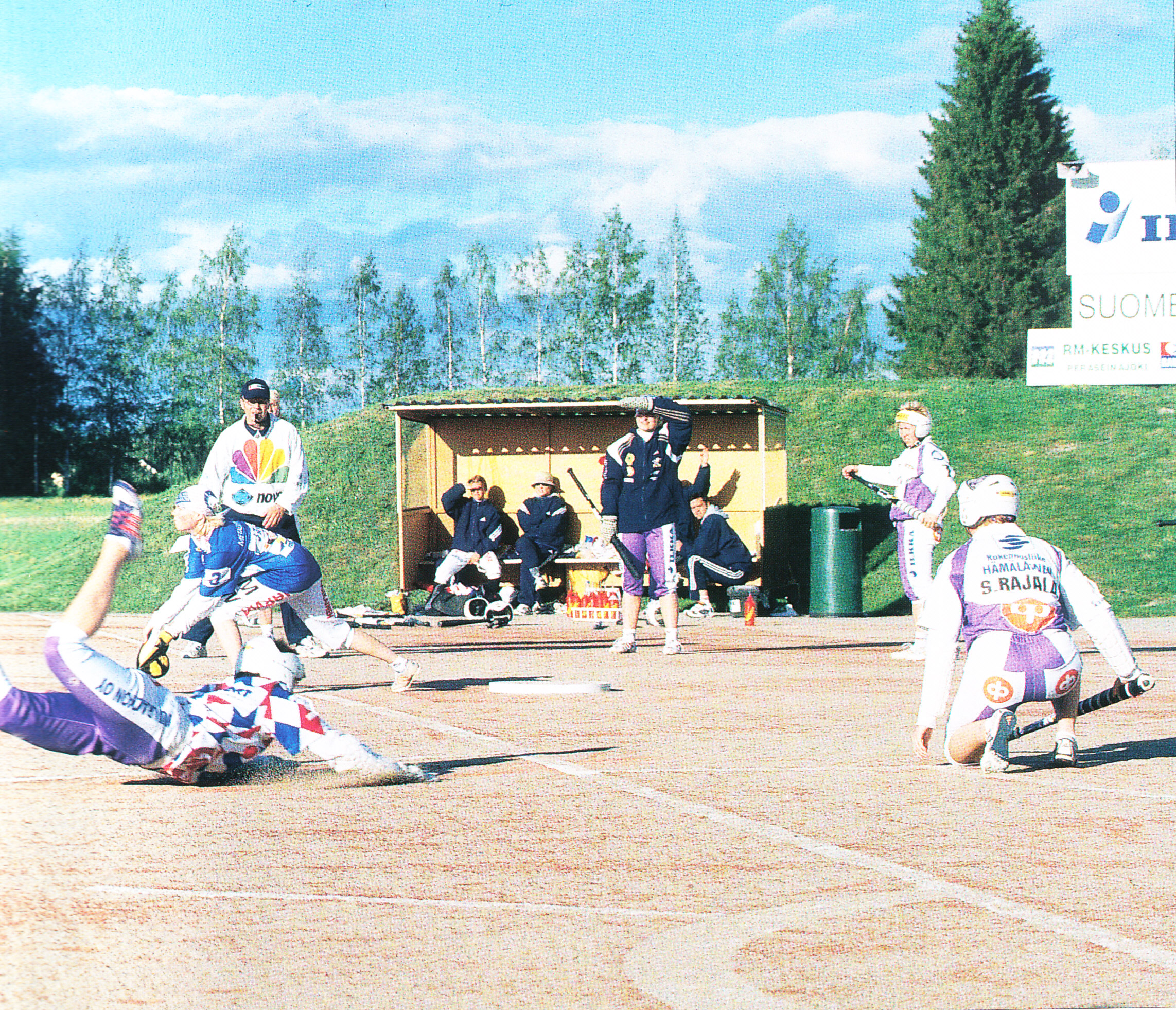
Women's pesäpallo team in 2000
