= Vaikkojoki =

Vaikkojoki Vaikonjoki
- Nickname: Vaikko

Location
- Country: Finland
- Province: Northern Karelia
- Region: North Savo
- Municipalities: Juuka and Kaavi

Physical characteristics
- Source: Lake Vaikkojärvi
  - location: Juuka, Northern Karelia
  - coordinates: 63°15′25″N 28°51′37″E
  - elevation: 187.2 m (614 ft)
- Mouth: Lake Kaavinjärvi
  - location: Kaavi, Northern Savonia
  - coordinates: 62°55′35″N 28°38′15″E
  - elevation: 101 m (331 ft)
- Length: 50 km (31 mi)

Vaikkojoki River is a 50-kilometre (31 mi) long river, which is in provinces of Northern Karelia and Northern Savonia.

The waters of Vaikkojoki River flows from Lake Vaikkojärvi to Lake Kaavinjärvi, from the municipality of Juuka to municipality of Kaavi. The elevation difference of the river is more than 60 metres (200 ft). There are 27 rapids in Vaikkojoki River. The total length of the rapids is approximately 7 kilometres (4 mi).

Lake Kärenjärvi, Lake Vihtajärvi, Lake Saarijärvi and Lake Retunen are the largest lakes in the area of Vaikkojoki River.

The total length of Vaikkojoki Canoeing Route is about 90 kilometres (56 mi).

== Tourism ==
Vaikkojoki River is a versatile recreational and leisure area offering outdoor activities round the year. Most of the tourism enterprises of the area are located in Kaavi, Northern Savonia.

The tourism enterprises of Vaikkojoki area offer accommodation services which include holiday villages, cottages and camping sites. The transportation services and hiring services (equipments for canoeing, fishing and skiing) are also available.

The program services include many kinds of activities: archery, biking, boating, canoeing, cross-country skiing, fishing, winter fishing, hiking, horse riding, berry picking, mushroom picking, sauna, shooting the rapids and walking with snowshoes. The local tourism enterprises sell the fishing permissions too.

=== Shooting the rapids ===
In Kaavi it is possible to shoot the rapids on Vaikkojoki River in the spring and early summer. The expeditions, covering 17 kilometres (11 mi), are done in a purpose-made boat steered by a professional helmsman.

=== Canoeing Route ===
The total length of the Canoeing Route of Vaikkojoki River is circa 90 kilometres (56 mi).

There are landing sites near Lake Lietukka, Makkarasärkkä, Kusiaiskoski Rapid, Rakkinekoski Rapid and Multivääränkoski Rapid. Some of the campfire sites are covered.

Rapid	Length (m)	Elevation (m)	Class
Lake Vaikkojärvi
Pond Vaikkolampi
Puksaminsahi
Riitasuonsahi
Koivuniemensahi
Ahmonkoski
Koivukoski
Pond Mäntylampi
Lake Metsä-Vaikko
Vaikon tammi	100
Jokilammenkoski	100	1,0	I
Hirvolankosket	1000	9,0	I
Lake Lietukka (Lake Lietejärvi)
Murtosaarenkoski	150	1,5	I
Kalliokoski	450	4,0	I
Kantosaarenkoski	600	6,0	I
Hirvisaarenkoski	350	2,5	I
Myllykoski	400	5,0	II
Ylä-Jokipolvenkoski	100	1,0	I
Ala-Jokipolvenkoski	400	2,0	I
Pond Suuri Kotalampi
Iso Kotakoski	400	2,0	I
Pieni Kotakoski	50	0,5	viv
Makkarasärkät
Markkakoski	400	1,0	I
Pielisenpitkä	600	4,5	I+
Suarvanniva	160	0,5	viv
Kusiaiskoski	350	2,5	I
Rakkinekoski	150	2,0	I+
Ylä-Kalliokoski	250	2,0	I+
Ala-Kalliokoski	150	1,0	viv
Multivääränkoski	850	4,5	I+
Piilukoski	150	1,0	I
Polvikoski	150	1,0	I-
Lake Välijärvi
Ruukinkoski	100	1,0	I-
Lake Kärenjärvi
Kärenkoski	100	0,5	viv
Lake Vihtajärvi
Vihtakoski
Lake Pieni-Kortteinen
Kylänkosket
Lake Suuri Kortteinen
Sivinvirta
Lake Saarijärvi
Saarivirta
Lake Retunen
Melttusvirta
Lake Kaavinjärvi

=== Fishing ===
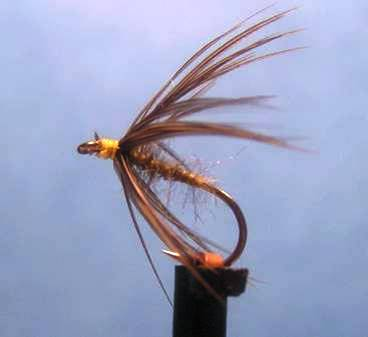
An artificial "fly" is used in fly fishing.

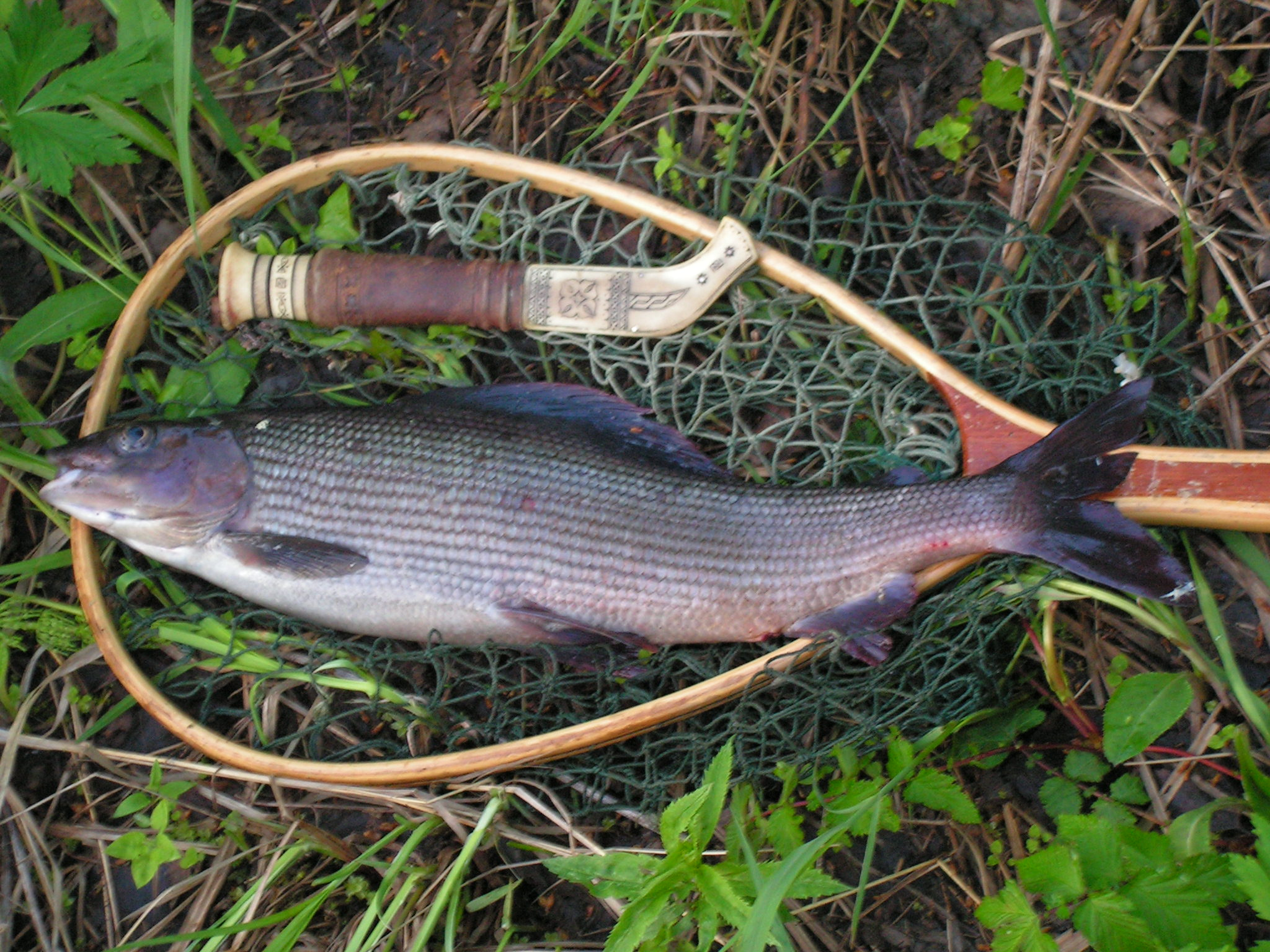
The Grayling (Thymallus thymallus)

==== Species ====
The natural catch species of the rapids of Vaikkojoki River are the brown trout (Salmo trutta), the grayling (Thymallus thymallus) and the ide (Leuciscus idus). Stocked catch species are the rainbow trout (Oncorhynchus mykiss) and the grayling. The northern pike (Esox lucius) is also a catch species.

==== Fishing permits ====
A fishing permit for Vaikkojoki River can be obtained e.g. from the local tourist enterprises. A fisherman 18 to 64 years old has to purchase also personal National fishing management fee (Valtion kalastuksenhoitomaksu in Finnish). The child under the age of 12 is allowed to fish with the same fishing permit of an accompanied adult. The special fishing permits for school groups are available.

The fisherman may purchase a fishing permit for a day, week or for the whole season. One of the fishing permits covers the whole area from Lake Vaikkojärvi, Juuka of Northern Karelia down to Sivinvirta Rapid, Kaavi of Northern Savonia. Usually the permit covers also the lakes of the area. Some fishing permits cover only certain part of the river.

Allowed fishing methods in the rapids are spin fishing and fly fishing. The amount of catch is limited. Fishing is not permitted in Kajoonkoski Rapid.

== Protection status ==
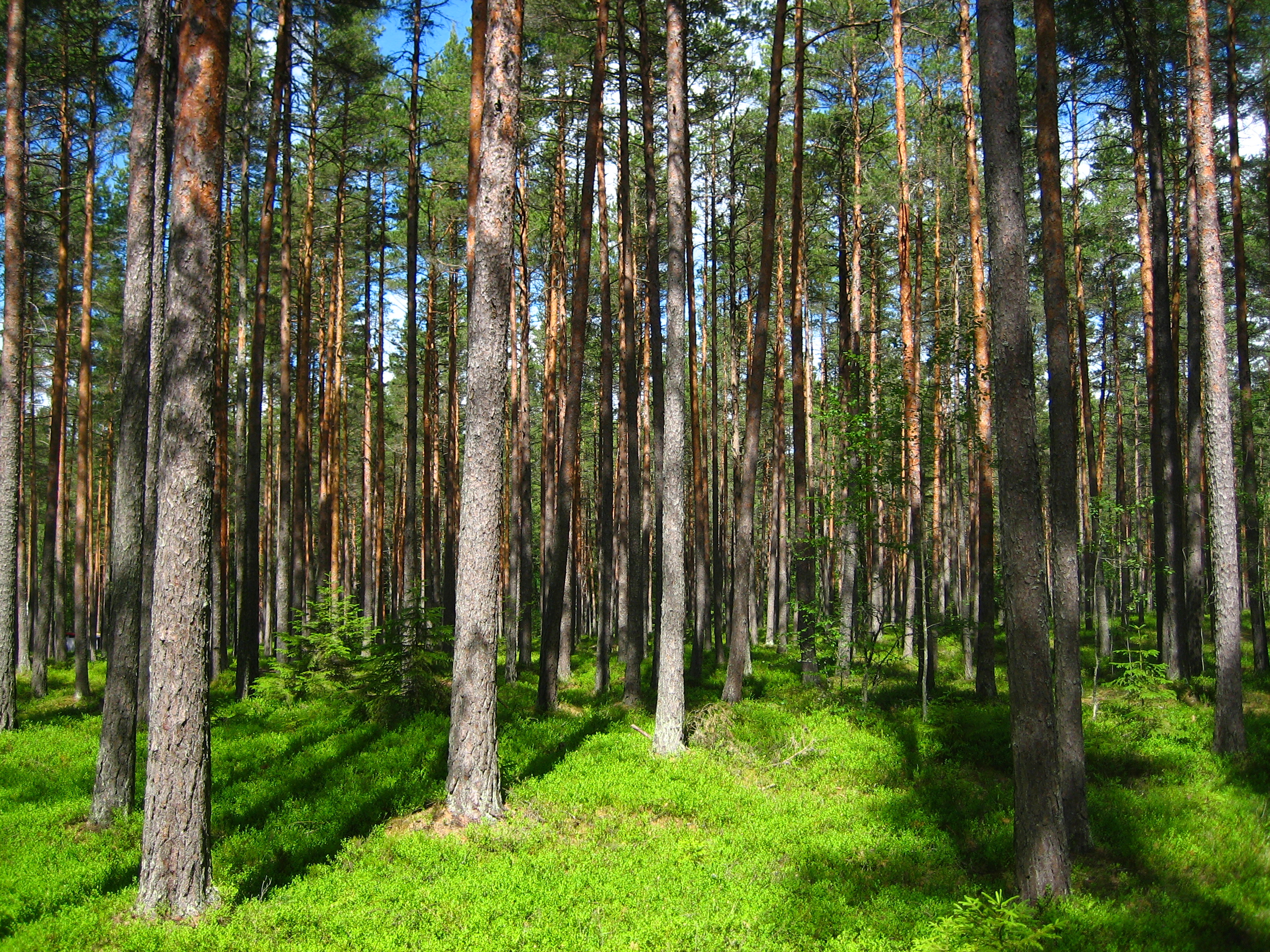
Boreal forest in summer

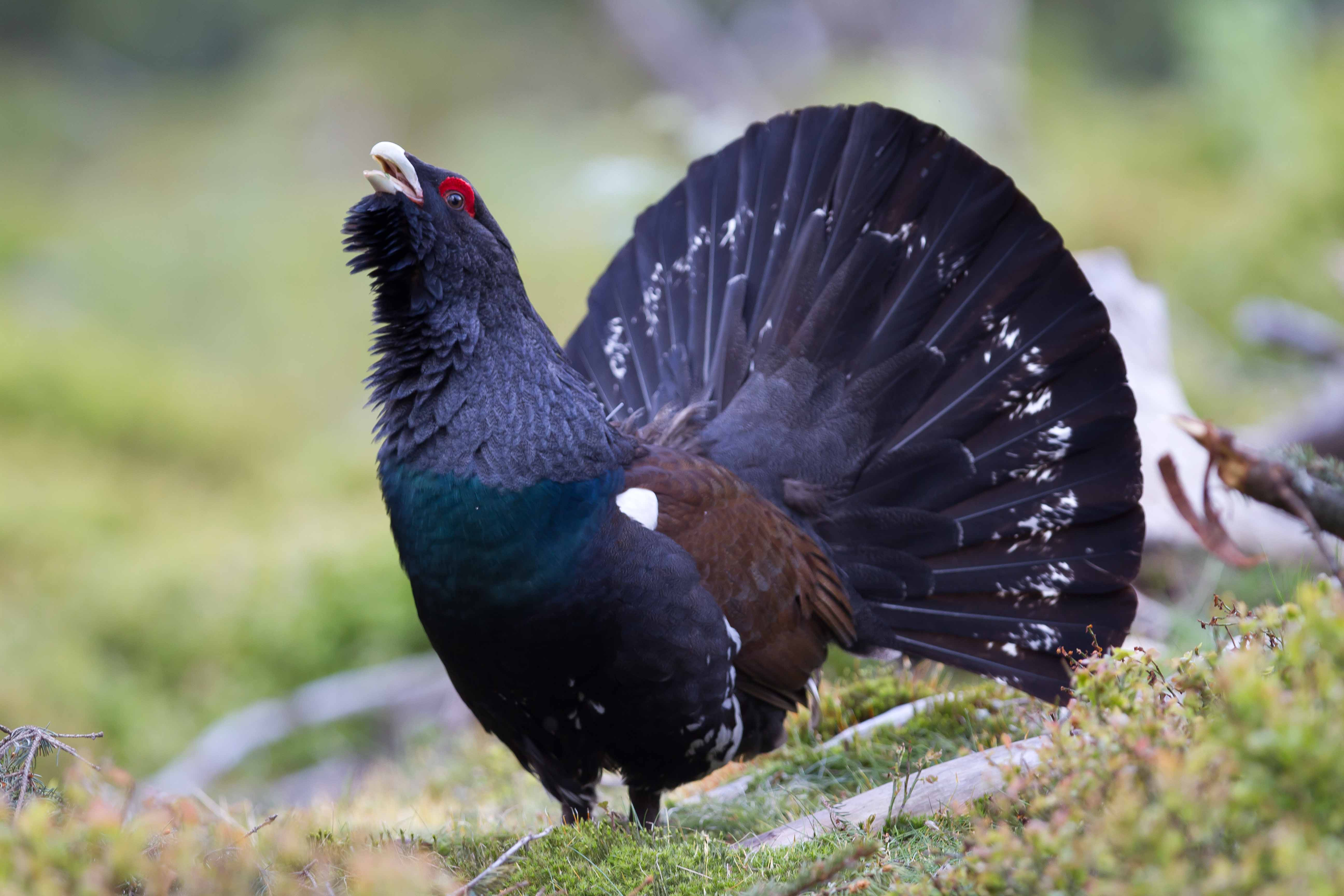
Western capercaillie (Tetrao urogallus)

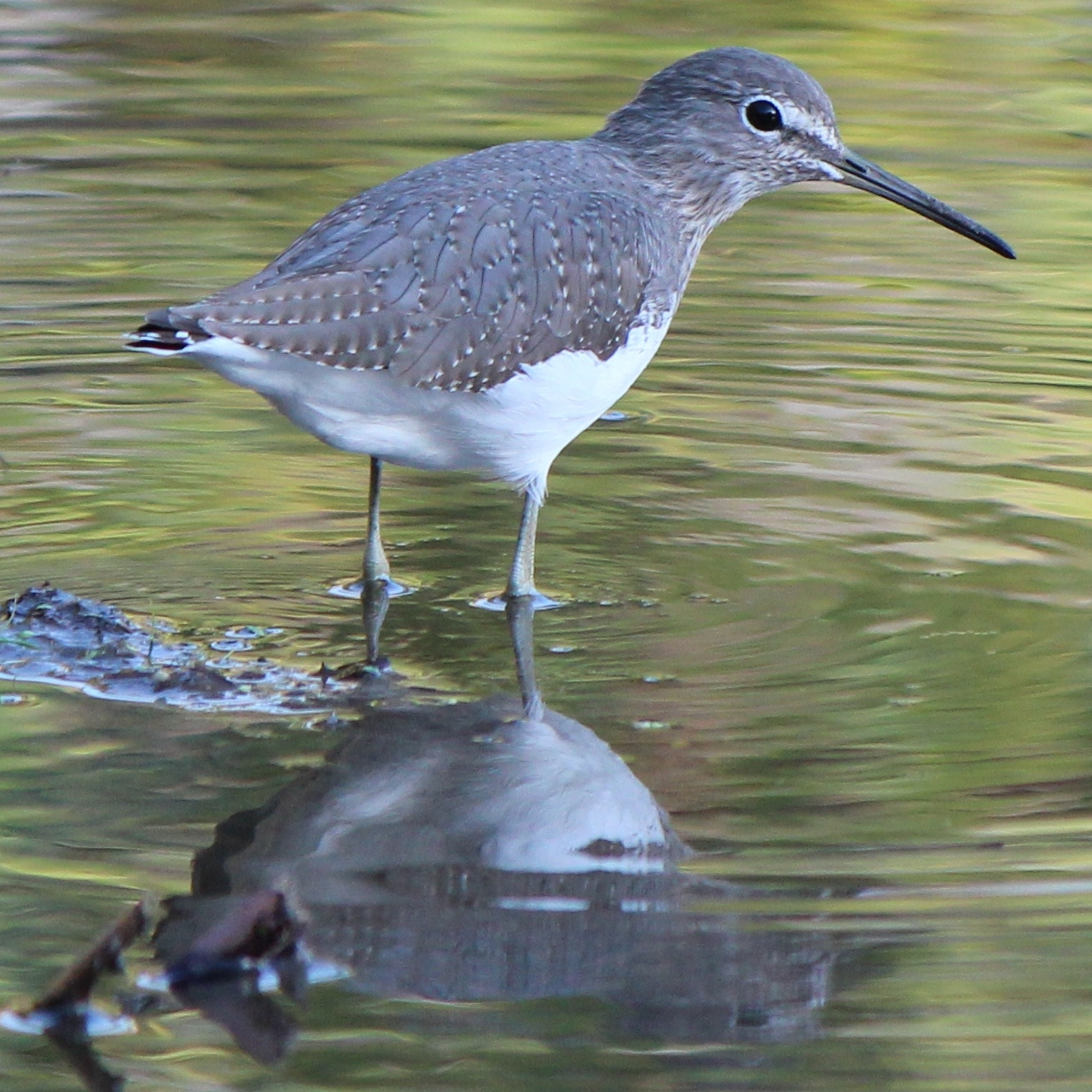
Green sandpiper (Tringa ochropus)

Vaikkojoki River has been designated the status of a protected area enlisted in the Natura 2000 ecological network of the E.U.

=== Habitat types ===
Vaikkojoki River is situated in Boreal Biogeographic Region. Protected area covers 258 hectares. The most typical habitat types are coniferous woodland (50% of the area), Western taïga (31%), Fennoscandian natural rivers (25%) and bog woodland (19%).

The other habitats of Vaikkojoki Natura 2000 Site are natural dystrophic lakes and ponds, active raised bogs, transition mires and quaking bogs.

The minimum elevation of Vaikkojoki Natura 2000 Site is 104 metres (341 ft). The maximum is 190 metres (620 ft), and the mean is 131 metres (430 ft).

=== Bird species ===
Black woodpecker (Dryocopus martius), common crane (Grus grus) and western capercaillie (Tetrao urogallus) are the biggest birds in the area of Vaikkojoki.

The green sandpiper (Tringa ochropus) and the common gull (Larus canus) are typical freshwater birds in the river habitat. Other bird species include the common chaffinch (Fringilla coelebs), the willow warbler (Phylloscopus trochilus), the tree pipit (Anthus trivialis), the common redpoll (Carduelis flammea), the great tit (Parus major), the spotted flycatcher (Muscicapa striata), the red crossbill (Loxia curvirostra), the Eurasian treecreeper (Certhia familiaris), the wood warbler (Phylloscopus sibilatrix), the greenish warbler (Phylloscopus trochiloides) and the goldcrest (Regulus regulus).
