= Tölli =

Tölli is a Finnish surname.

== Geographical distribution ==
As of 2014, 73.6% of all known bearers of the surname Tölli were residents of Finland (frequency 1:6,552), 23.9% of Hungary (1:36,090) and 1.8% of Sweden (1:468,893).

In Finland, the frequency of the surname was higher than national average (1:6,552) in the following regions:

1. North Ostrobothnia (1:805)
2. Kainuu (1:2,240)
3. Lapland (1:4,683)

== People ==
- Tapani Tölli (born 1951), Finnish politician
