= Kiviniemi cabinet =

71st cabinet of Finland

Kiviniemi's Cabinet
- 71st Cabinet of Finland

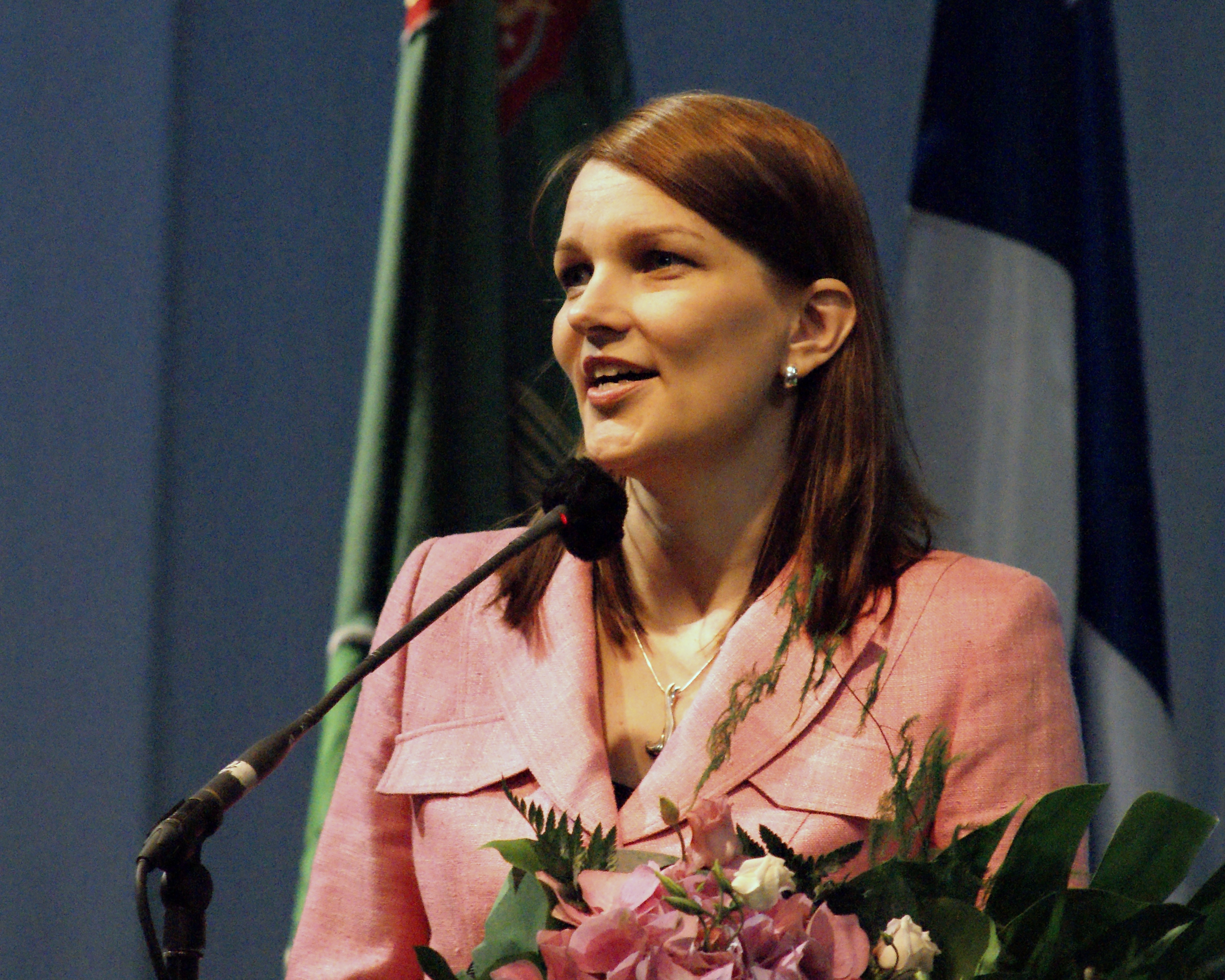
- Date formed: 22 June 2010
- Date dissolved: 22 June 2011

People and organisations
- Head of state: Tarja Halonen
- Head of government: Mari Kiviniemi
- Member parties: Centre Party; National Coalition Party; Green League; Swedish People's Party
- Status in legislature: Majority (coalition)

History
- Election: 2007 Finnish parliamentary election
- Predecessor: Vanhanen II Cabinet
- Successor: Katainen Cabinet

The cabinet of Mari Kiviniemi was Finland's 71st government. It was appointed by President Tarja Halonen on 22 June 2010. The cabinet's Prime Minister was Mari Kiviniemi.

The Kiviniemi Cabinet was a centrist coalition government composed of the Centre Party, the National Coalition, the Green League, and the Swedish People's Party. There were 12 women and 8 men in the cabinet, which made it the second cabinet in Finnish history with female majority. The Kiviniemi cabinet also had more ministers than any of its predecessors; it had 20 ministers, while the former cabinet had 18.

It was succeeded by the cabinet of Jyrki Katainen on 22 June 2011.

== Ministers ==
Portfolio	Minister	Took office	Left office	Party
Prime Minister	Mari Kiviniemi	22 June 2010	22 June 2011	Centre
Minister of Finance; Deputy Prime Minister	Jyrki Katainen	22 June 2010	22 June 2011	National Coalition
Minister for Foreign Affairs	Alexander Stubb	22 June 2010	22 June 2011	National Coalition
Minister for Foreign Trade and Development	Paavo Väyrynen	22 June 2010	22 June 2011	Centre
Minister of Justice	Tuija Brax	22 June 2010	22 June 2011	Green
Minister of the Interior	Anne Holmlund	22 June 2010	22 June 2011	National Coalition
Minister of Immigration and European Affairs	Astrid Thors	22 June 2010	22 June 2011	RKP
Minister of Defence	Jyri Häkämies	22 June 2010	22 June 2011	National Coalition
Minister of Public Administration and Local Government	Tapani Tölli	22 June 2010	22 June 2011	Centre
Minister of Education	Henna Virkkunen	22 June 2010	22 June 2011	National Coalition
Minister of Culture and Sport	Stefan Wallin	22 June 2010	22 June 2011	RKP
Minister of Agriculture and Forestry	Sirkka-Liisa Anttila	22 June 2010	22 June 2011	Centre
Minister of Transport	Anu Vehviläinen	22 June 2010	22 June 2011	Centre
Minister of Communications	Suvi Lindén	22 June 2010	22 June 2011	National Coalition
Minister of Economic Affairs	Mauri Pekkarinen	22 June 2010	22 June 2011	Centre
Minister of Social Affairs and Health	Juha Rehula	22 June 2010	22 June 2011	Centre
Minister of Health and Social Services	Paula Risikko	22 June 2010	22 June 2011	National Coalition
Minister of Labour	Anni Sinnemäki	22 June 2010	22 June 2011	Green
Minister of the Environment	Paula Lehtomäki	22 June 2010	22 June 2011	Centre
Minister of Housing	Jan Vapaavuori	22 June 2010	22 June 2011	National Coalition

Preceded by Vanhanen II Cabinet	Cabinet of Finland; 22 June 2010 – 22 June 2011	Succeeded by Katainen Cabinet
