= Kaavinjärvi =

Lake in Kaavi, Finland

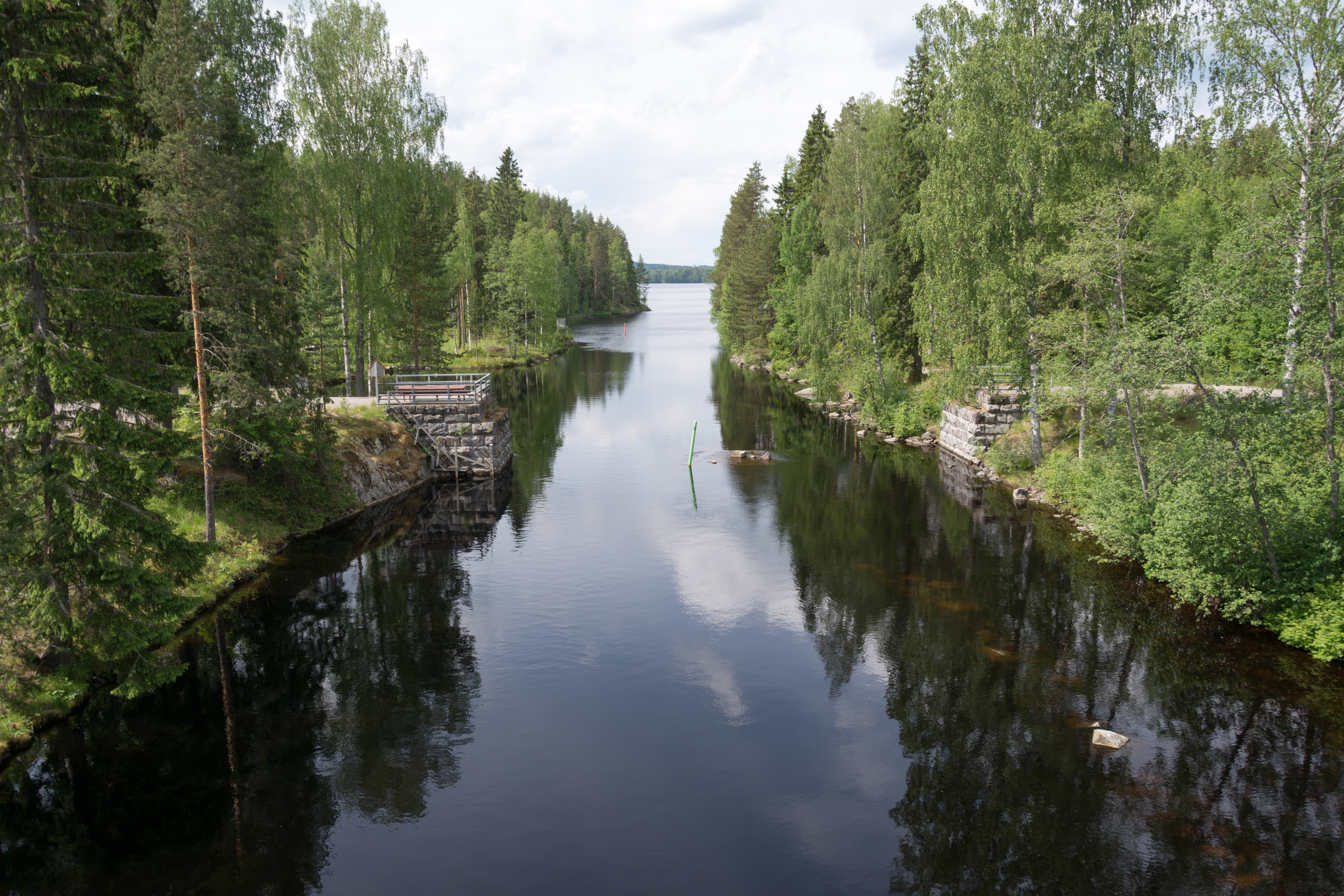
- The Kaavinkoski Canal flows from Kaavinjärvi to Rikkavesi.

- Location within Finland
- Location: Northern Savonia
- Coordinates: 62°55′N 28°35′E
- Primary outflows: The Kaavinkoski Canal
- Catchment area: Vuoksi
- Basin countries: Finland
- Surface area: 21.047 km^{2} (8.126 sq mi)
- Average depth: 9.06 m (29.7 ft)
- Max. depth: 41.9 m (137 ft)
- Water volume: 0.191 km^{3} (0.046 cu mi)
- Shore length^{1}: 126.56 km (78.64 mi)
- Surface elevation: 101 m (331 ft)
- Frozen: December-April
- Islands: The biggest islands is Hukkasaari, 123 ha (0.47 sq mi)
- Settlements: Kaavi
- ^{1} Shore length is not a well-defined measure.

Kaavinjärvi is a lake in eastern Finland. The surface area of the lake is approximately 21 square kilometres (8 sq mi).

Kaavinjärvi is situated in the municipality of Kaavi. Kaavinjärvi means (in Finnish) lake of Kaavi. In language of Sami (also spelled Sámi or Saami) the word kaavi means boat harbour.

Kaavinjärvi is 101 metres (331 ft) above the sea level. The Kaavinkoski Canal flows from Kaavinjärvi to Rikkavesi. There is a marked shipping route from Kaavinjärvi to Saimaa via lakes Rikkavesi and Juojärvi.

Kaavinjärvi was formed by glacial melting at the end of the Ice Age. The average depth is almost 9 metres (ca 30 ft) and the maximum depth is ca 42 metres (137 ft).

At approximately 123 hectares (0.47 sq mi) Hukkasaari is the biggest island of Kaavinjärvi. The second biggest island is Lehtosaari, 47 hectares (0.18 sq mi).

The total length of shoreline is 127 kilometres (79 mi).

== Harbours ==
Kaavi harbour is situated ca 800 metres from the village centre. The harbour is suitable for temporary stay and camping. The depth of the shipping route to the Kaavi harbour is 1,5 metres. There are guest boat jetty, boat ramp, covered campfire site, waste bin and toilet in the harbour.

Landing site of Mönkkössaari island is situated in the northern end of Kaavinjärvi. There are covered campfire site and toilet in the landing site of the island.

Melttusvirta excursion harbour is suitable for temporary stay. There are jetty, boat ramp, covered campfire site, beach, cabin for changing clothes, dry toilet, waste bin in the harbour. The depth of the route to the harbour is 1.2 metres.

Kaavinkoski excursion harbour is by the Kaavinkoski Canal. The harbour is near the bridge of Tuusniemi-Luikonlahti road. The harbour is suitable for both boaters and canoers. The depth of the shipping route to the harbour is 1.5 metres.

== See also ==
- List of lakes in Finland
- Vaikkojoki
