= Jari Koskinen =

Finnish politician

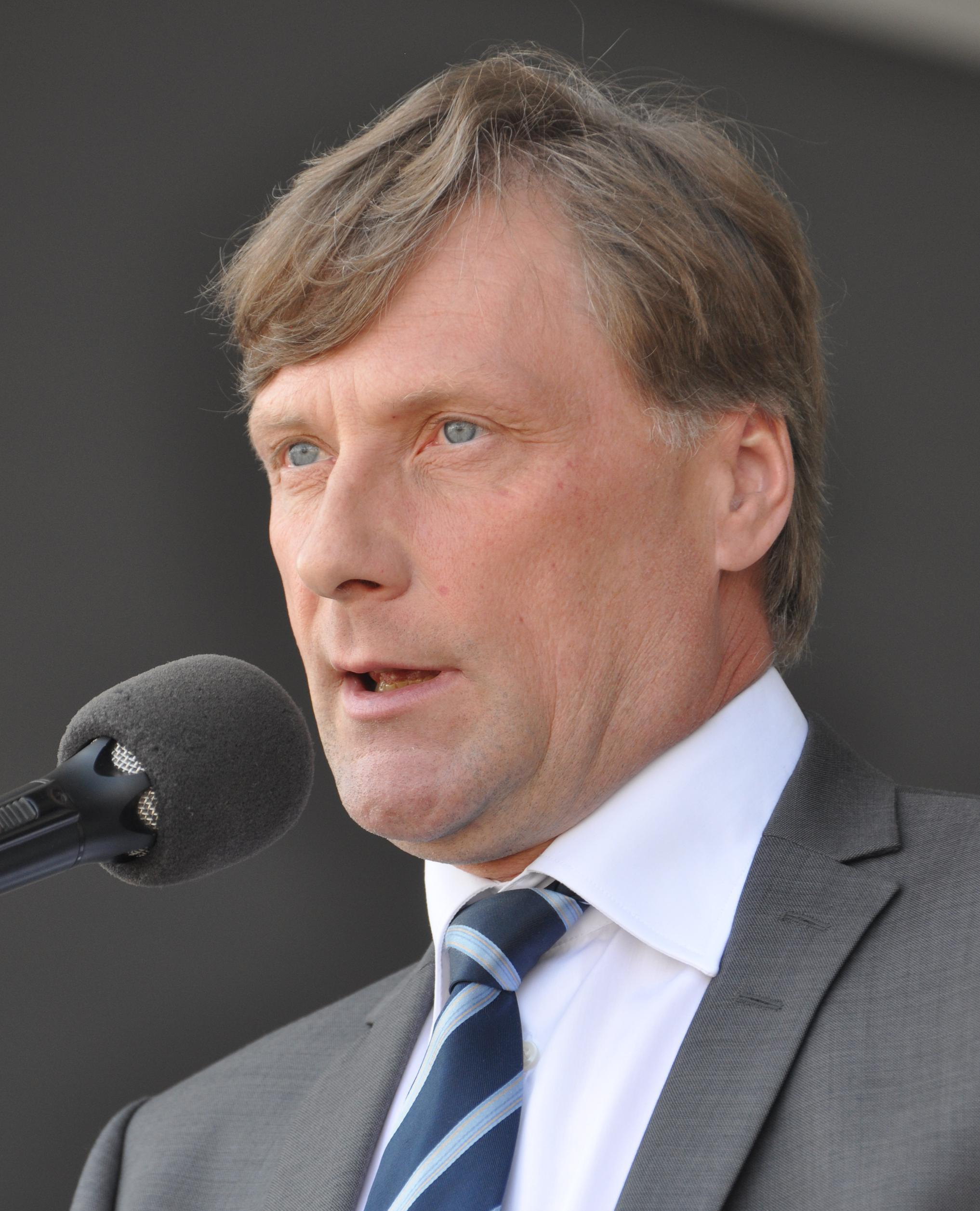
- Jari Koskinen in 2012.

Minister of Agriculture and Forestry
- In office 22 June 2011 – 24 June 2014
- Prime Minister: Jyrki Katainen
- Preceded by: Sirkka-Liisa Anttila
- Succeeded by: Petteri Orpo
- In office 31 May 2002 – 17 April 2003
- Prime Minister: Paavo Lipponen
- Preceded by: Raimo Tammilehto
- Succeeded by: Juha Korkeaoja

Personal details
- Born: 11 June 1960 (age 65) Hauho, Finland
- Party: National Coalition
- Spouse: Minna Koskinen

Jari Antero Koskinen (born 11 June 1960) is a Finnish politician who was Minister for Agriculture and Forestry of Finland from 2011 to 2014, as well as a former representative of the National Coalition Party in the Parliament of Finland. He also served as Minister for Agriculture and Forestry in Paavo Lipponen's second Cabinet from 2002 to 2003.

In 2015 Koskinen was nominated as the CEO of the Association of Finnish Local and Regional Authorities. He remained in the position until resigning himself in August 2018.

Political offices
Preceded by Raimo Tammilehto; Sirkka-Liisa Anttila	Minister for Agriculture and Forestry; 2002–2003; 2011-2014	Succeeded by Juha Korkeaoja -
