= Fagerholm II cabinet =

40th government of Finland

Fagerholm II Cabinet
- 40th Cabinet of Finland
- Date formed: 3 March 1956
- Date dissolved: 27 May 1957

People and organisations
- Prime Minister: Karl-August Fagerholm
- Member parties: SDP; Agrarian League; RKP; People's Party
- Status in legislature: Majority government

History
- Predecessor: Kekkonen V
- Successor: Sukselainen I

Karl-August Fagerholm's second cabinet was the 40th government of Republic of Finland. The cabinet existed from March 3, 1956 to May 27, 1957. It was a majority government.

Assembly
Minister	Period of office	Party
Prime Minister; Karl-August Fagerholm	March 3, 1956–May 27, 1957	Social Democrat
Minister for Foreign Affairs; Ralf Törngren	March 3, 1956–May 27, 1957	Swedish People's Party
Minister of Justice; Vilho Väyrynen; Arvo Helminen	March 3,1956–May 2,1956; May 2,1956–May 27,1957	Social Democrat; Independent
Minister of Defence; Kauno Kleemola	March 3, 1956–May 27, 1957	Agrarian League
Minister of the Interior; Vilho Väyrynen	March 3, 1956–May 27, 1957	Social Democrat
Minister of Finance; Emil Skog	March 3, 1956–May 27, 1957	Social Democrat
Deputy Minister of Finance; Mauno Jussila	March 3, 1956–May 27, 1957	Agrarian League
Minister of Education; Johannes Virolainen	March 3, 1956–May 27, 1957	Agrarian League
Minister of Agriculture; Martti Miettunen	March 3, 1956–May 27, 1957	Agrarian League
Minister of Transport and Public Works; Eino Palovesi	March 3, 1956–May 27, 1957	Agrarian League
Deputy Minister of Transport and Public Works; Hannes Tiainen	March 3, 1956–May 27, 1957	Social Democrat
Minister of Trade and Industry; Kauno Kleemola	March 3, 1956–May 27, 1957	Agrarian League
Minister of Social Affairs; Tyyne Leivo-Larsson	March 3, 1956–May 27, 1957	Social Democrat

Preceded by Kekkonen V	Cabinet of Finland; March 3, 1956 – May 27, 1957	Succeeded by Sukselainen I
