= Kekkonen V cabinet =

Government of Finland from 1954 to 1956

- 39th Cabinet of Finland
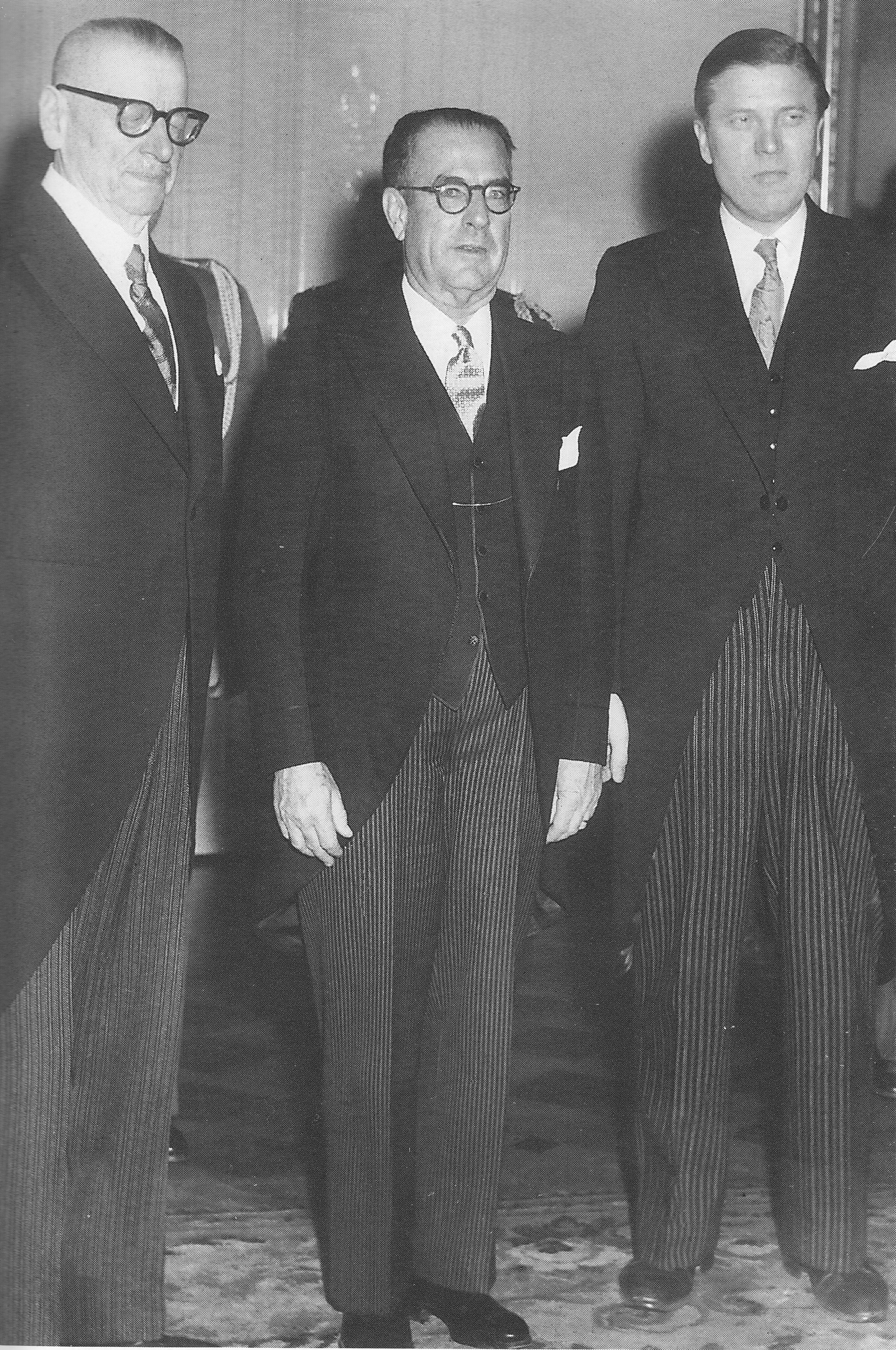
- J. K. Paasikivi and John D. Hickerson and Johannes Virolainen in 1955
- Date formed: 20 October 1954
- Date dissolved: 3 March 1956

People and organisations
- Prime Minister: Urho Kekkonen (until Feb 15 1956)
- Total no. of members: 14
- Member parties: SDP; Agrarian League
- Status in legislature: Majority (until Feb 15 1956); Caretaker (after Feb 15 1956)

History
- Predecessor: Törngren
- Successor: Fagerholm II

Kekkonen's fifth cabinet was the 39th government of Finland. The cabinet existed from 20 October 1954 to 3 March 1956. It was a majority government. Prime Minister Urho Kekkonen was elected the President of Finland on February 15 February 1956, resigning as Prime Minister and dissolving the cabinet in the process.

Assembly
Minister	Period of office	Party
Prime Minister; Urho Kekkonen	October 20, 1954 – March 3, 1956	Agrarian Party
Minister of Foreign Affairs; Johannes Virolainen	October 20, 1954 – March 3, 1956	Agrarian Party
Minister of Justice; Aarre Simonen; Weio Henriksson	October 20, 1954 –November 6, 1954; November 6, 1954 – March 3, 1956	Social Democrat
Minister of Defence; Emil Skog	October 20, 1954 – March 3, 1956	Social Democrat
Minister of the Interior; Väinö Leskinen; Valto Käkelä	October 20, 1954 – September 30, 1955; September 30, 1955 – March 3, 1956	Social Democrat; Social Democrat
Minister of Finance; Penna Tervo†	October 20, 1954 – March 3, 1956	Social Democrat
Deputy Minister of Finance; Veikko Vennamo	October 20, 1954 – March 3, 1956	Agrarian Party
Minister of Education; Kerttu Saalasti	October 20, 1954 – March 3, 1956	Agrarian Party
Minister of Agriculture; Viljami Kalliokoski	October 20, 1954 – March 3, 1956	Agrarian Party
Minister of Transport and Public Works; Martti Miettunen	October 20, 1954 – March 3, 1956	Agrarian Party
Deputy Minister of Transport and Public Works; Hannes Tiainen	October 20, 1954 – March 3, 1956	Social Democrat
Minister of Trade and Industry; Aarre Simonen	October 20, 1954 – March 3, 1956	Social Democrat
Minister of Social Affairs; Onni Peltonen	October 20, 1954 – March 3, 1956	Social Democrat
Deputy Minister of Social Affairs; Tyyne Leivo-Larsson; Hannes Tiainen	October 20, 1954 – March 3, 1956; October 22, 1954 – March 3, 1956	Social Democrat; Social Democrat

Preceded by Ralf Törngren's cabinet	Cabinet of Finland; October 20, 1954–March 3, 1956	Succeeded by Karl-August Fagerholm's second cabinet
