= Taisto Tähkämaa =

Finnish politician (1924–2025)

Minister of Agriculture and Forestry
- In office 26 May 1979 – 5 May 1983
- Prime Minister: Mauno Koivisto; Kalevi Sorsa

Minister of Defence
- In office 15 May 1977 – 25 May 1979
- Prime Minister: Kalevi Sorsa

Personal details
- Born: 11 December 1924 Pargas, Finland
- Died: 21 December 2025 (aged 101) Kaarina, Finland
- Party: Centre Party
- Occupation: Agrologist

Taisto Tähkämaa (11 December 1924 – 21 December 2025) was a Finnish Centre Party politician. In the Parliament of Finland he held various cabinet posts, including minister of defence and minister of agriculture and forestry in the 1970s and 1980s.

== Life and career ==
Tähkämaa was born in Pargas on 11 December 1924. He was an agrologist and agricultural advisor by profession. He fought in World War II against the Soviet Red Army. He was a member of the Centre Party and served as its vice chair between 1980 and 1984. He was elected to Parliament on 23 March 1970 and served until 21 March 1991.

He was appointed minister of defense on 15 May 1977 to the second cabinet of Kalevi Sorsa, and his tenure ended on 25 May 1979. Next day he was named as the minister of agriculture and forestry and served in the second cabinet of Mauno Koivisto until 18 February 1982. Tähkämaa continued to hold the same post in the third cabinet of Kalevi Sorsa from 19 February 1982 to 5 May 1983.

Tähkämaa died on 21 December 2025 at the age of 101.
