= Tyyne Leivo-Larsson =

Finnish ambassador and MP

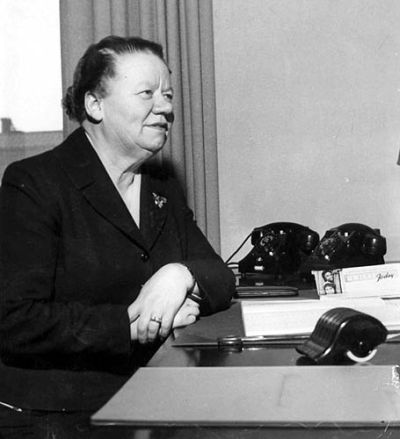
Tyyne Leivo-Larsson in 1948

Tyyne Lilja Leivo-Larsson (née Leivo; 3 March 1902 Uusikirkko – 1 August 1977 Helsinki) was a Finnish Ambassador and MP. She was the first Finnish woman to serve as Ambassador in Oslo from 1958 to 1966 and as Envoy to Reykjavík in 1958–1964 (Ambassador 1964–1965) and the first Nordic woman, who led the government when she served as Deputy Prime Minister for Reino Kuuskoski in 1958.

Leivo-Larsson was Deputy Minister of Social Affairs and Minister of Social Affairs from 1948 to 1950 in the Fagerholm I, Törngren and Kekkonen V from 1954 to 1956 and in 1958 in the Kuuskoski Cabinet and Fagerholm‘a second cabinet in 1954 and from 1956 to 1957.

She was first elected to the Parliament from the Social Democratic Party in 1948–1958 and then as a member of the Social Democratic Union of Workers and Smallholders party for the years 1966–1970. During this time she was chairwoman of the Social Democratic Union of Workers and Smallholders Parliamentary Group. She married Bror Nils Larsson in 1937.

== Youth ==
Tyyne Leivo participated with the Red Guard at the age of 16 in the civil war in the Battle of Tampere. Possibly, she was in the group that at the last moment broke out of the city. Poet Kössi Kaatra describes her as a young, ready-to-fight youth who also dared drive the wounded.

Tyyne Leivo completed a middle school in 1918 in the new girls school in Helsinki. She studied in 1925–1929 at the High School as journalism but did not complete the degree.

== In Parliament ==
In the Parliament, Leivo-Larsson was a member of the Committee on Banking, Labor and Subcommittee on Foreign Affairs. She was also a member of the Finnish delegation of the Nordic Council.
