= Matti Miikki =

Finnish farmer and politician (1889–1960)

Minister of Finance
- In office 20 September 1951 – 8 July 1953
- Prime Minister: Urho Kekkonen

Personal details
- Born: Matti Nikolai Miikki; 30 December 1889 Ruokolahti, Finland
- Died: 1960 (aged 70–71) Imatra, Finland
- Party: Centre Party
- Occupation: Farmer

Matti Miikki (1889–1960) was a Finnish farmer and a Centre Party politician. He was a long-term member of the Parliament and the minister of finance between 1951 and 1953.

== Biography ==
Miikki was born in Ruokolahti on 30 December 1889. He was a member of the Centre Party. He was elected to the Parliament for the party on 21 October 1930 and served there until 9 July 1960. He was appointed minister of finance on 20 September 1951 to the third cabinet of Urho Kekkonen. Miikki's tenure ended on 8 July 1953.

Miikki died in Imatra in 1960 while serving a deputy.
