= Mari Kiviniemi =

Prime Minister of Finland from 2010 to 2011

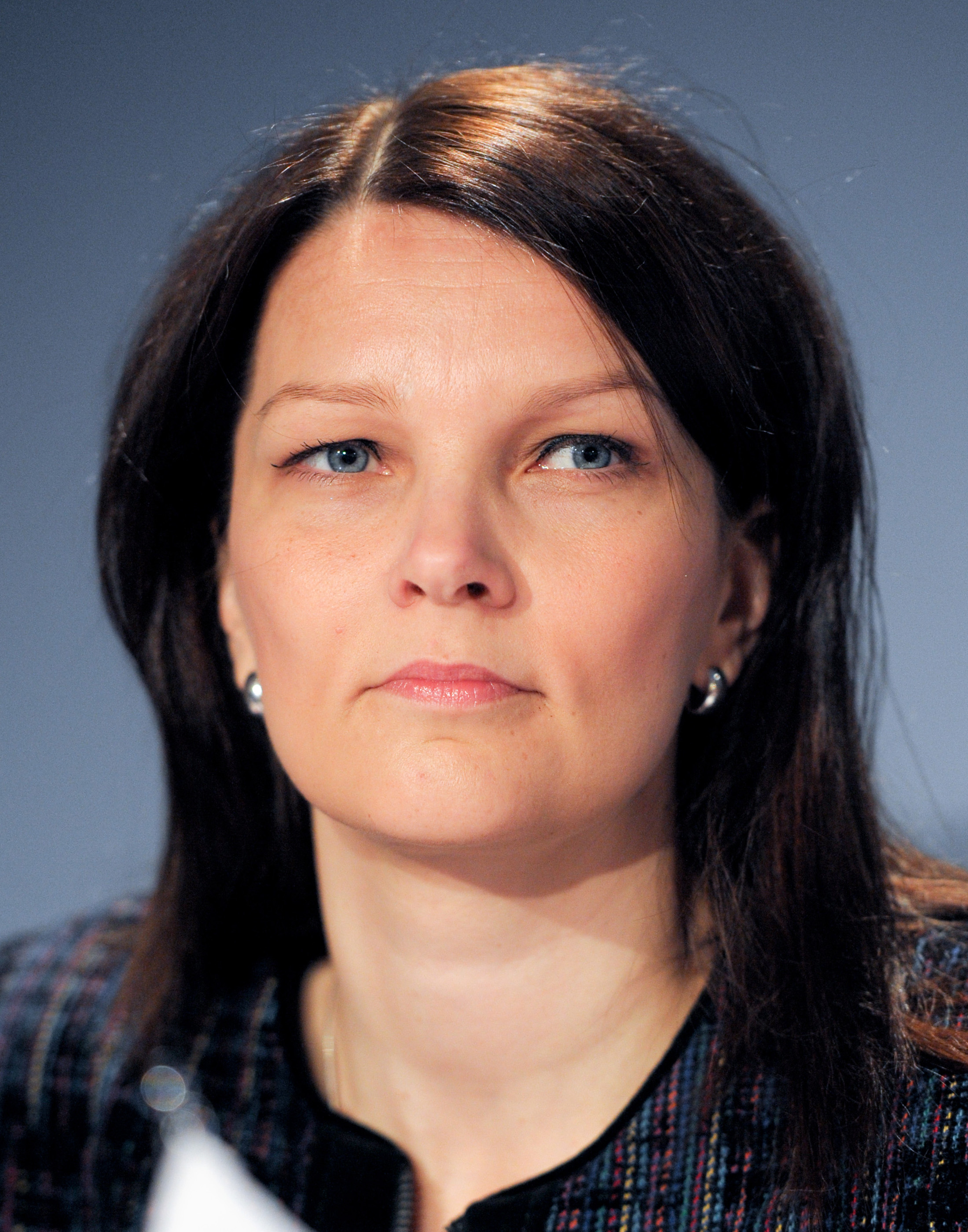
- Kiviniemi in 2010

41st Prime Minister of Finland
- In office 22 June 2010 – 22 June 2011
- President: Tarja Halonen
- Deputy: Jyrki Katainen
- Preceded by: Matti Vanhanen
- Succeeded by: Jyrki Katainen

Minister for Public Administration and Local Government
- In office 19 April 2007 – 22 June 2010
- Prime Minister: Matti Vanhanen
- Preceded by: Position established
- Succeeded by: Tapani Tölli

Minister for Foreign Trade and International Development Acting
- In office 3 September 2005 – 2 March 2006
- Prime Minister: Matti Vanhanen
- Preceded by: Paula Lehtomäki
- Succeeded by: Paula Lehtomäki

Leader of the Centre Party
- In office 12 June 2010 – 9 June 2012
- Preceded by: Matti Vanhanen
- Succeeded by: Juha Sipilä

Member of the Finnish Parliament
- In office 24 March 1995 – 22 September 2014
- Constituency: Helsinki

Personal details
- Born: Mari Johanna Kiviniemi; 27 September 1968 (age 58) Seinäjoki, Finland
- Party: Centre
- Spouse: Juha Louhivuori (m. 1996)
- Children: 2
- Education: University of Helsinki

Mari Johanna Kiviniemi (born 27 September 1968) is a Finnish politician, who served as the 41st and second female Prime Minister of Finland from 2010 to 2011.

Since 25 August 2014, she is Deputy Secretary-General of the OECD.

== Life and career ==
Kiviniemi was born in Seinäjoki, Finland. She grew up in rural Southern Ostrobothnia, the daughter of a chicken farmer, and went to school in Jalasjärvi. As a teenager during high school, she spent a year as an exchange student in Germany. She enrolled in the University of Helsinki in 1988 to study economics.

Kiviniemi is a career politician, and first ran as a candidate for Member of Parliament in 1991, garnering less than 5,000 votes, while serving as the Secretary-General of the Centre Party Student Union. The year after completing the work for her master's degree in Social Sciences, she ran again in the 1995 general elections, this time winning a seat from the Southern Ostrobothnia district with 9,350 votes.

Kiviniemi is also a member of the Helsinki city council, in addition to her work in national politics. She has been on the city council since 2005.

=== Leader of Centre Party ===
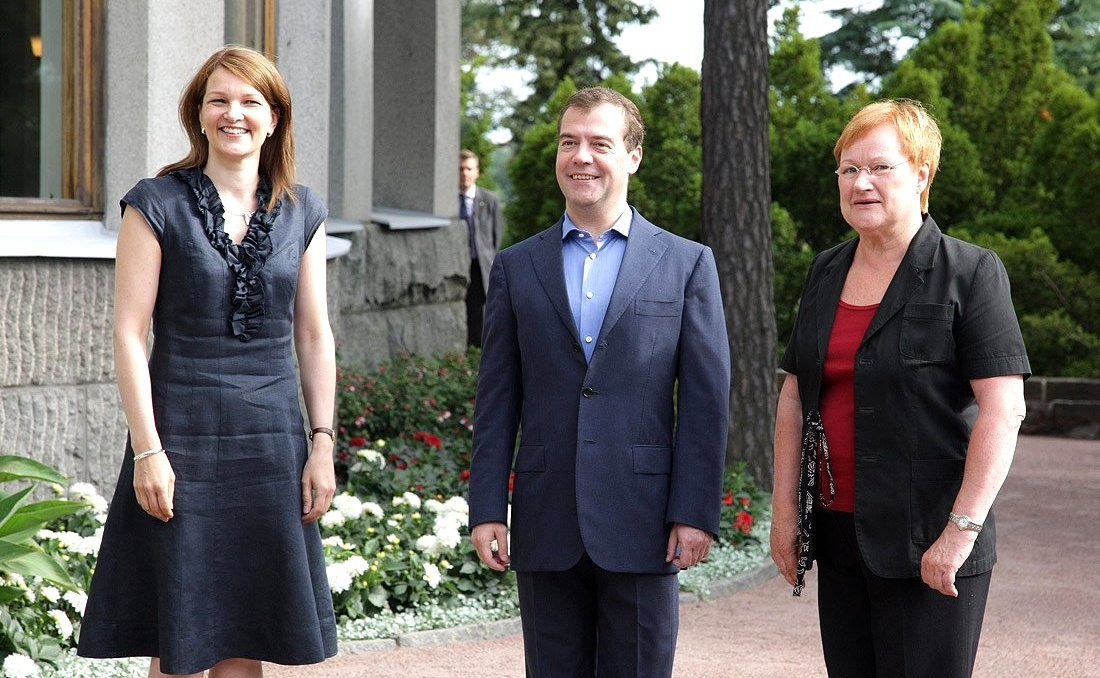
Mari Kiviniemi (left) with then-President of Russia Dmitry Medvedev and then-President of Finland Tarja Halonen (right)

In 2003, Kiviniemi was elected to a leadership position within the Centre Party, serving as vice-chairman (one of three) until June 2008, when she was voted off at that summer's party convention. She became a special advisor to Prime Minister Matti Vanhanen in 2004, and was twice appointed by him to serve as a Cabinet minister: first in September 2005 on a temporary basis when the incumbent went on maternity leave for six months; and then on a full-time basis in April 2007.

On 22 January 2010, one month after Prime Minister Vanhanen announced he would be stepping down as leader (chair) of the Centre Party at its June 2010 convention, Kiviniemi announced her candidacy for the vacancy. Her campaign was formally launched in April.

Delegates to the Centre Party Convention met in Lahti to elect a new leader on 12 June 2010. Kiviniemi won the second-round run-off, defeating Mauri Pekkarinen by a vote of 1,357 to 1,035. Prime Minister Vanhanen met with President Tarja Halonen on Friday 18 June and asked her for permission to resign as Prime Minister. Kiviniemi's new post was approved by Parliament on 22 June 2010, with a vote of 115 in favour, 56 against and 29 MPs abstaining or absent. Her election made her Finland's second female prime minister, after Anneli Jäätteenmäki in 2003.

=== 2011 general election ===
The 2011 general election saw the rise of the True Finns party, who gained 35 seats at the expense of all but one of the other parliamentary parties. Kiviniemi's Centre Party was hit hardest, losing 16 of the 51 seats they had previously held and falling from being the largest party to the fourth largest. Kiviniemi initially declared that her party would not seek to be part of the next government, but later accepted an invitation by Jyrki Katainen to join coalition negotiations. Those negotiations broke down, however, and after six other parties announced they had come to an agreement, she presented her government's resignation to the President and was officially succeeded by Katainen as Prime Minister on 22 June 2011. The Centre Party went into opposition, with Kiviniemi continuing as its chairwoman.

Resignation as Chairperson

After new polls showed the Centre Party had made no gains against the governing parties, she decided to step down as chairperson and did not stand in the chairperson election in the summer of 2012. She was succeeded by Juha Sipilä as the party's chair.

Kiviniemi was quoted as saying to the media "In my opinion the Centre Party has done very good work in opposition, in both style and substance... I expected that this would be visible in a rise in support in the polls. But if that doesn’t happen, I should be able to draw conclusions."

The former prime minister was criticised heavily by party heavyweight Paavo Väyrynen. Kiviniemi said she believed that the party was strong, but could only succeed when the leadership enjoys absolute support. "The message from the field is that somebody should take responsibility for the defeat," said Kiviniemi. "Party work demands a lot from others, but most of all from myself. Although I am also of the opinion that the defeat was the result of many factors, in reality the final responsibility rests with the party chair." YLE News.

=== Deputy Secretary-General of the OECD ===
Kiviniemi took up her duties as OECD Deputy Secretary-General on 25 August 2014. Her role consists of sharing her experience to help increase the impact and relevance of OECD work and to contribute to the public policy challenges of promoting inclusive growth, jobs, equality and trust.

She is responsible for the strategic oversight of the OECD's work on Efficient and Effective Governance; Territorial Development; Trade and Agriculture, as well as Statistics. She is also responsible for advancing the Better Life Initiative.

== Personal life ==
Kiviniemi married Juha Mikael Louhivuori, a businessman, in 1996. They have two children, Hanna and Antti. In addition to her native Finnish, she speaks Swedish, German and English.

She lists her hobbies as listening to classical music (she plays the piano and flute), running, skiing, and in-line rollerblading. The family has a summer cottage on lake Vanajavesi.

== Cabinets ==
- Kiviniemi Cabinet (2010–2011)

Political offices
Preceded by Paula Lehtomäki	Minister for Foreign Trade and International Development; Acting; 2005–2006	Succeeded by Paula Lehtomäki
New office	Minister for Public Administration and Local Government; 2007–2010	Succeeded by Tapani Tölli
Preceded by Matti Vanhanen	Prime Minister of Finland; 2010–2011	Succeeded by Jyrki Katainen
