= Kalle Jutila =

Finnish agronomist and politician (1891–1966)

Kaarle (Kalle) Teodor (K. T.) Jutila (27 January 1891 – 21 June 1966; surname until 1906 Lindfors) was a Finnish agronomist, politician and diplomat, born in Pirkkala. He was a member of the Parliament of Finland from April to October 1945, representing the Agrarian League. He served as Minister without portfolio from 17 December 1927 to 26 October 1928, Deputy Minister of Agriculture from 16 October to 22 December 1928, Minister of Agriculture from 14 December 1932 to 25 September 1936, from 17 April to 29 September 1945 and from 17 November 1953 to 5 May 1954 and Minister of People's Service from 17 November 1944 to 17 April 1945. He was the Finnish Ambassador to the United States from 1945 to 1951, to Cuba from 1948 to 1951 and to Mexico from 1950 to 1951.
