= North Karelia Province =

Former province of Finland

North Karelia Province Pohjois-Karjalan lääni Norra Karelens län
- Province of Finland
- 1960–1997
- Coat of arms
- Capital: Joensuu
- Area
  - 1.1.1993: 21,585 km^{2} (8,334 sq mi)
- Population
  - 1.1.1993: 177,893
- History
  - Established: 1960
  - Disestablished: 1997
Preceded by	Succeeded by
Province of Kuopio	Eastern Finland

The North Karelia Province (Finnish: Pohjois-Karjalan lääni, Swedish: Norra Karelens län) was a province of Finland from 1960 to 1997.

It was established in 1960 when it was separated from the Province of Kuopio. In 1997 it was reunited with Kuopio and together with the Province of Mikkeli it was merged into the new Province of Eastern Finland.

== Maps ==
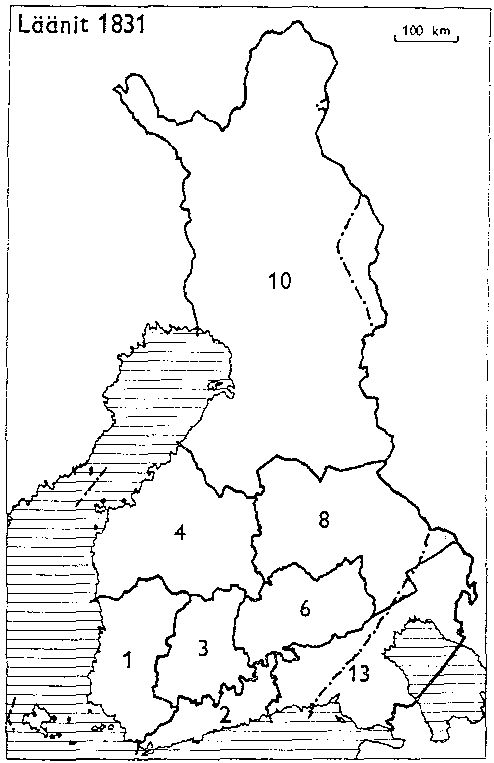
Provinces of Finland 1831: 1: Turku and Pori, 2: Uusimaa, 3: Häme, 4: Vaasa, 6: Mikkeli, 8: Kuopio, 10: Oulu, 13: Viipuri

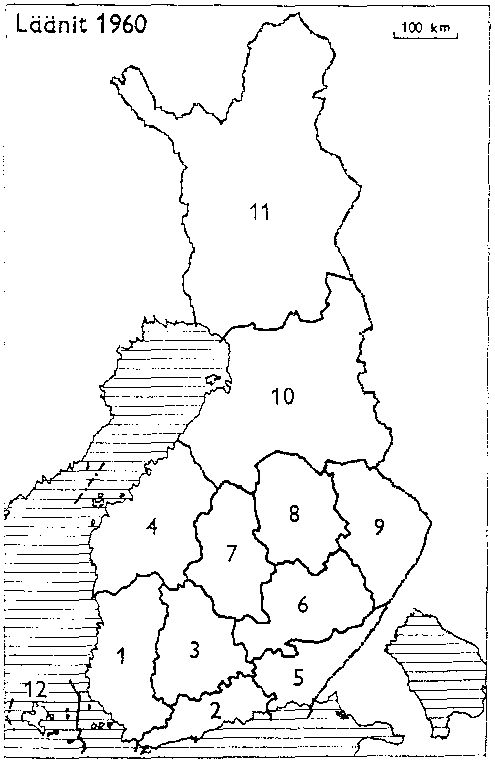
Provinces of Finland 1960: 1: Turku and Pori, 2: Uusimaa, 3: Häme, 4: Vaasa, 5: Kymi, 6: Mikkeli, 7: Central Finland, 8: Kuopio, 9: North Karelia, 10: Oulu, 11: Lapland, 12: Åland

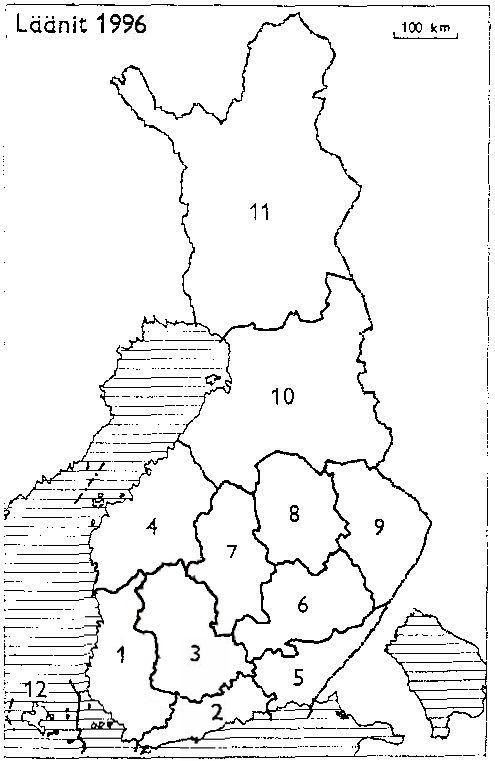
Provinces of Finland 1996: 1: Turku and Pori, 2: Uusimaa, 3: Häme, 4: Vaasa, 5: Kymi, 6: Mikkeli, 7: Central Finland, 8: Kuopio, 9: North Karelia, 10: Oulu, 11: Lapland, 12: Åland

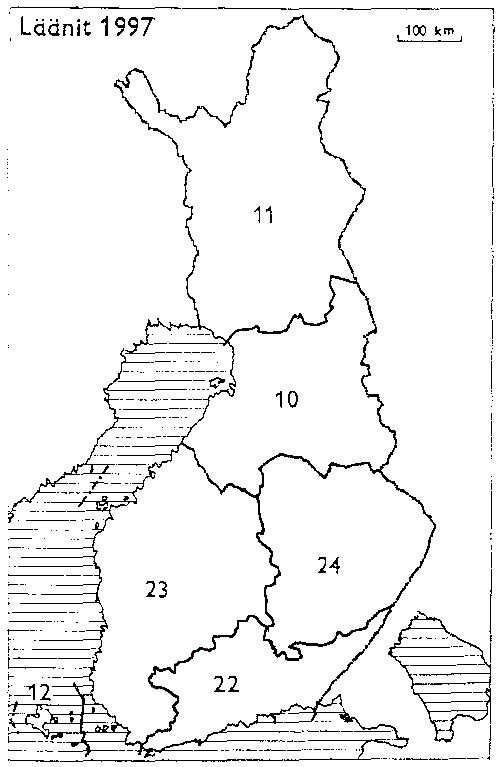
Provinces of Finland 1997: 10: Oulu, 11: Lapland, 12: Åland, 22: Southern Finland, 23: Western Finland, 24: Eastern Finland

== Municipalities in 1997 (cities in bold) ==
- Eno
- Ilomantsi
- **Joensuu**
- Juuka
- Kesälahti
- Kiihtelysvaara
- **Kitee**
- Kontiolahti
- **Outokumpu**
- **Lieksa**
- Liperi
- **Nurmes**
- Polvijärvi
- Pyhäselkä
- Rääkkylä
- Tohmajärvi
- Tuupovaara
- Valtimo
- Värtsilä

== Former municipalities (disestablished before 1997) ==
- Nurmeksen mlk
- Pielisjärvi

== Governors ==
- Lauri Riikonen 1960–1967
- Esa Timonen 1967–1992
- Hannu Tenhiälä 1992–1997
