= Peräseinäjoki =

Former municipality in South Ostrobothnia, Finland

Coordinates: 62°34′N 23°04′E

The former coat of arms of Peräseinäjoki.

Peräseinäjoki (Finnish pronunciation: [ˈperæˌsei̯næˌjoki]) (Note: The name part "perä" (lit. 'rear, back') refers to its location "behind upstream" from Seinäjoki.) is a former municipality of Finland. It merged with the town of Seinäjoki on January 1, 2005.

It was located in the province of Western Finland and is part of the South Ostrobothnia region. The municipality had a population of 3,653 (2004) and covered an area of 459.13 km^{2} of which 14.11 km^{2} was water. The population density was 8.2 inhabitants per km^{2}.

The municipality was unilingually Finnish.

== History ==
Location of Peräseinäjoki in Finland

The first travellers at the areas of Peräseinäjoki have most likely been hunters from the northern parts of Satakunta and from Tavastia. The first permanent inhabitants are estimated to be arrived at the 16th century and the population was 149 according to census figures on year 1750. Peräseinäjoki separated from Ilmajoki and formed its own municipal administration on 1868.

== Today ==
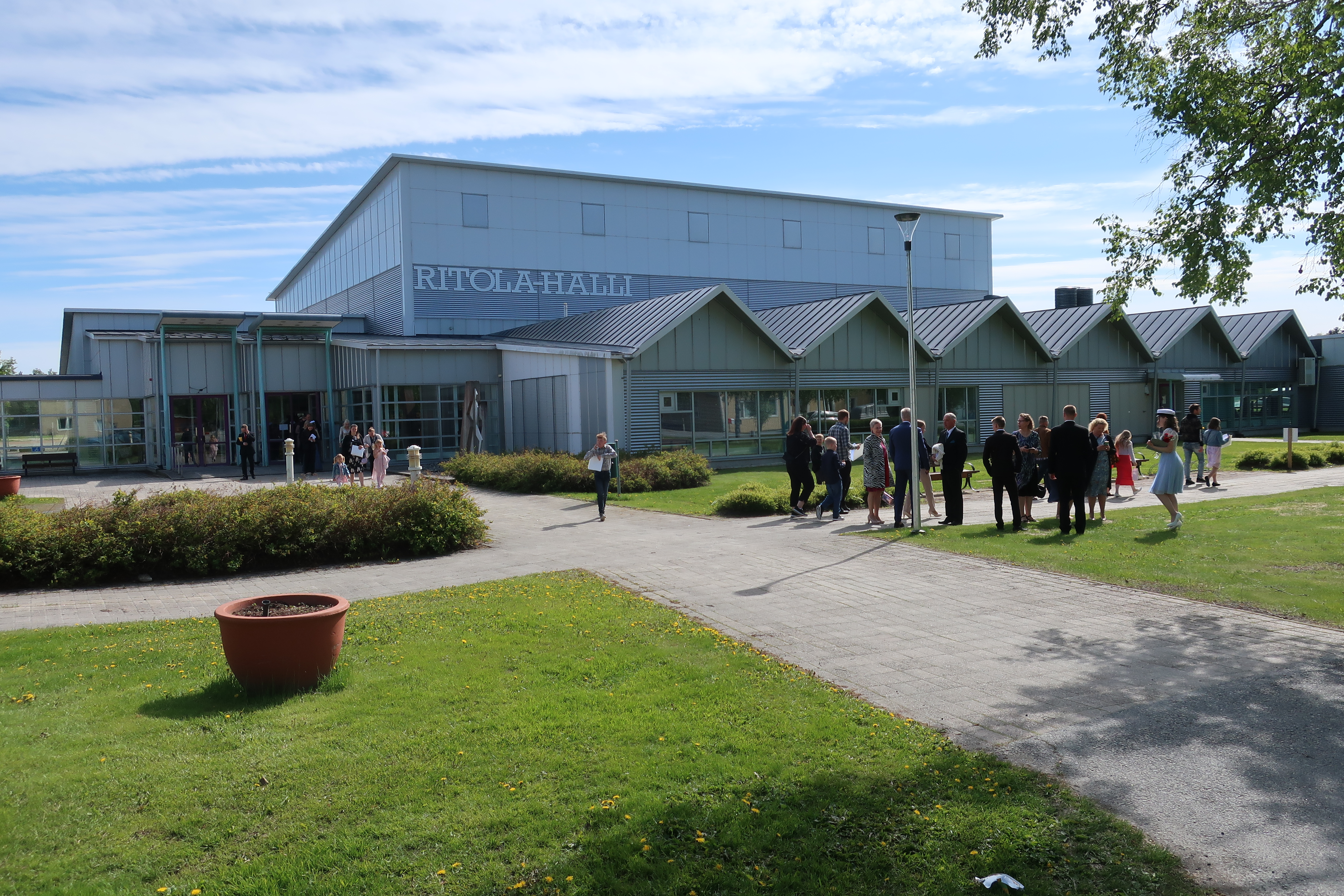
Ritola-halli, a sports hall in Peräseinäjoki

Nowadays, Peräseinäjoki is best known of its steel industry, Kalajärvi and sports tradition. There is The Finnish Emigrant Museum, The Finnish Emigration Center in Peräseinäjoki. The center will document and present the history and the present-day of emigration, immigration and internal migration. The task of the center will also be collecting, preserving, researching and setting out material concerning migration. The Emigrant Center will act as a meeting place and an information center for those who are interested in internationality and those who are searching their roots.

== Notable residents ==
- Vieno Simonen (1898–1994), Finnish politician and farmer
- Ville Ritola (1896–1982), a 5-time Olympic gold medal winner in long-distance running.

== Villages ==
The villages, hamlets and neighborhoods of the municipality of Peräseinäjoki are:

- Kihniä, Luoma, Peräseinäjoki, Viitala, Haapaluoma, Juupakylä, Siltala
