= Lauri Riikonen =

Finnish jurist and politician (1900–1973)

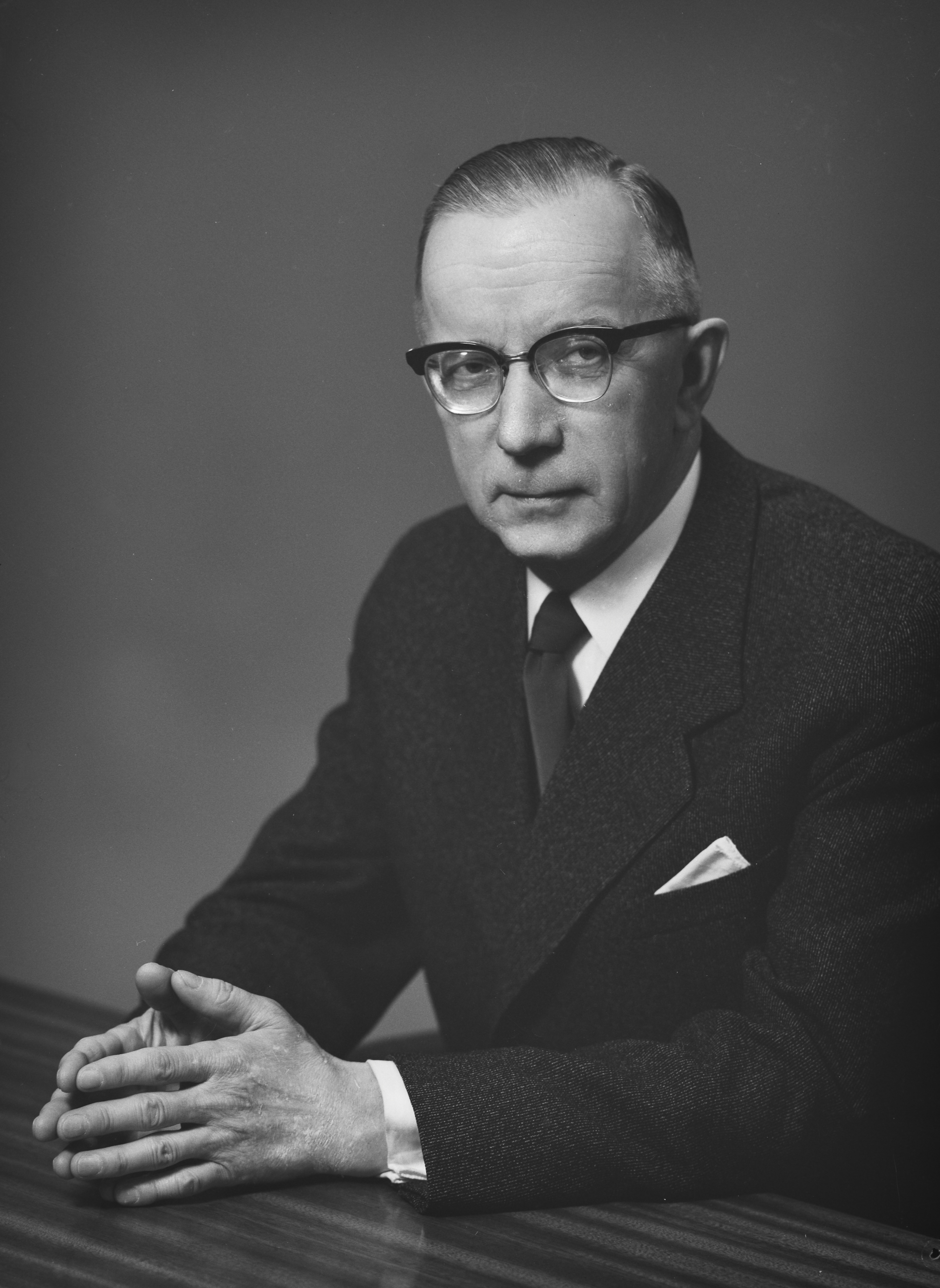
Lauri Riikonen in 1960

Lauri Riikonen (31 December 1900 – 24 June 1973) was a Finnish jurist and politician, born in Pielisjärvi. He was a member of the Parliament of Finland from 1945 to 1950, representing the Agrarian League. He served as Deputy Minister of the Interior from 17 March to 30 September 1950 and Deputy Minister of Transport and Public Works from 24 March to 31 March 1950. He was the governor of Kuopio Province from 1950 to 1960 and of Northern Karelia Province from 1960 to 1967.
