= Juha Korkeaoja =

Finnish politician (born 1950)

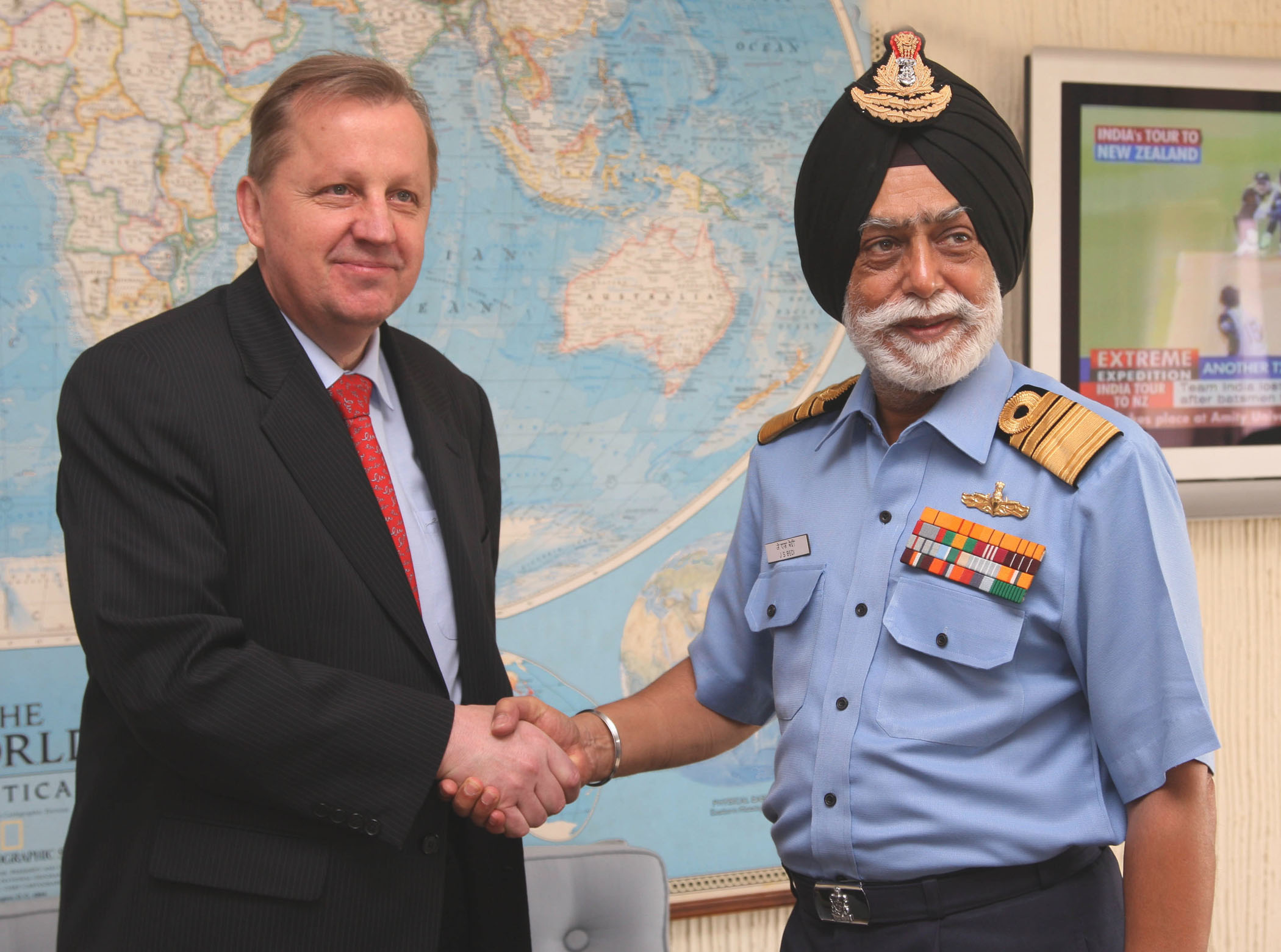
Juha Korkeaoja shaking hands with Vice Admiral Jagjit Singh Bedi in 2009.

Juha Sakari Korkeaoja (born 11 January 1950) is a Finnish politician. A member of the Centre Party, he was Member of the Parliament of Finland for Satakunta from 1991 to 2011 and Minister of Agriculture and Forestry in the Jäätteenmäki Cabinet and Vanhanen I Cabinet from 2003 to 2007.

Born in Kokemäki, Korkeaoja graduated as Master of Agriculture from the University of Helsinki in 1976. He later worked as a farmer. In addition to his parliamentary career, he was also member of the City Council of Kokemäki from 1993 to 2004. In the Parliament, Korkeaoja chaired the Defence Committee from 2007 to 2011. In the 2011 election, Korkeaoja was not elected to the Parliament anymore. He failed to return to the Parliament in the 2015 election.
