= Aku Sumu =

Finnish trade union leader and politician (1907–1988)

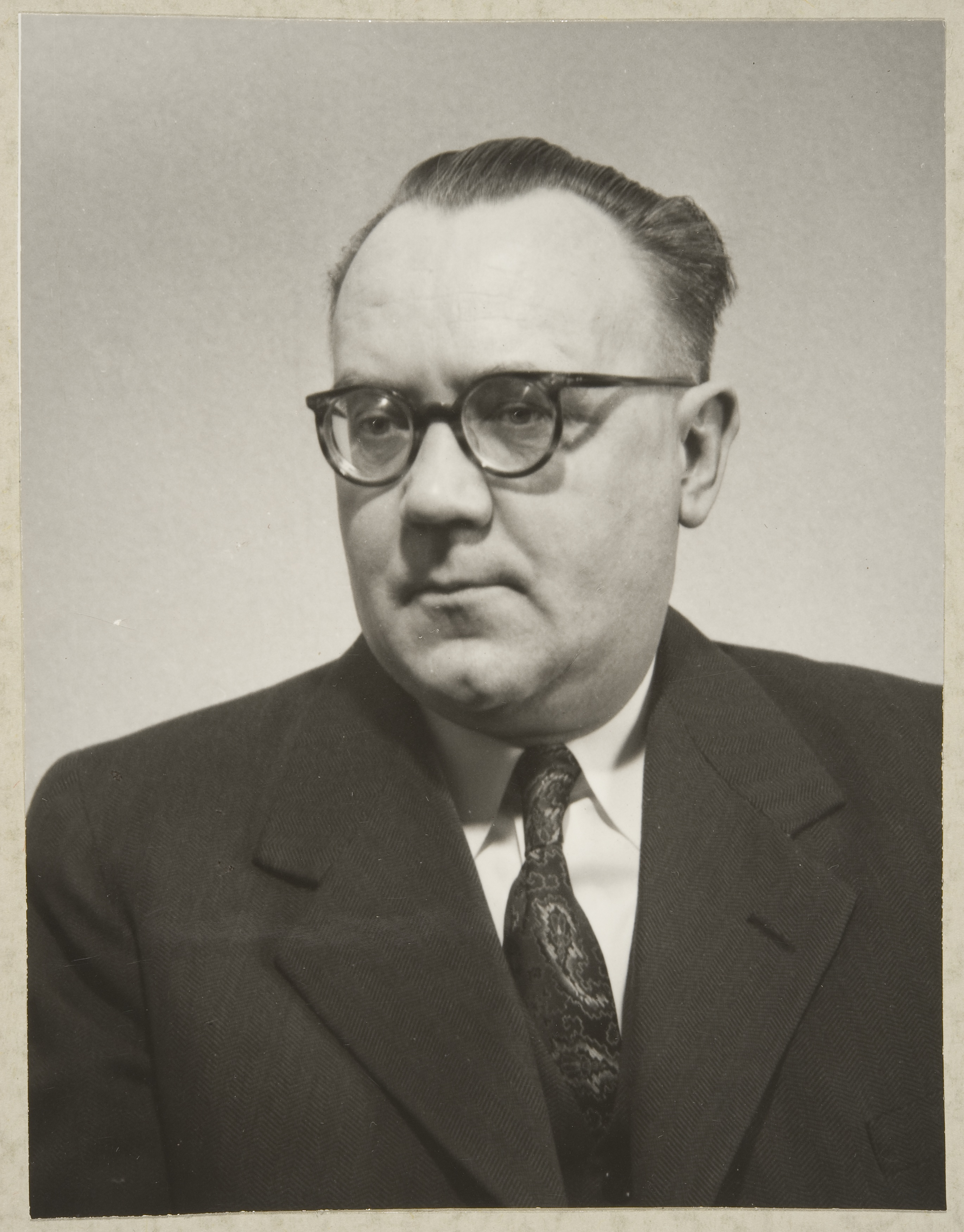
Aku Sumu (1950s)

Toimi August (Aku) Sumu (9 April 1907 – 31 July 1988) was a Finnish trade union leader and politician, born in Helsinki. He was a member of the Social Democratic Party of Finland (SDP). He served as Deputy Minister of Transport and Public Works from 5 May to 20 October 1954, as Deputy Minister of Social Affairs from 7 May to 20 October 1954 and as Minister of Transport and Public Works from 29 November 1957 to 28 February 1958. Sumu was the president of the Finnish Federation of Trade Unions (SAK) from 1949 to 1954.
