= Matti Lepistö =

Finnish politician

Leevi Matias (Matti) Lepistö (8 November 1901 in Toholampi – 7 December 1991) was a Finnish farmer and politician. He was a member of the Parliament of Finland from 1929 to 1958. Lepistö was Minister of Agriculture from 29 July 1948 to 17 March 1950 and Deputy Minister of Agriculture from 17 January 1951 to 29 November 1952, from 2 September to 29 November 1957 and from 26 April to 28 August 1958. He was at first a member of the Social Democratic Party of Finland (SDP), later of the Social Democratic Union of Workers and Smallholders (TPSL)
