= Sven Högström =

Finnish jurist and politician (1908–1995)

Sven Axel Högström (8 October 1908 – 12 November 1995) was a Finnish jurist and politician, born in Hanko. He was a member of the Parliament of Finland from 1954 to 1966, representing the Swedish People's Party of Finland. He served as Minister of Justice from 22 September 1951 to 16 November 1951 and from 29 August 1958 to 13 January 1959. Högström was the mayor of Ekenäs from 1938 to 1960. He was a presidential elector in the 1950, 1956 and 1962 presidential elections.
