= Juojärvi =

Lake in Eastern Finland

- Location within Finland
- Location: Savonia
- Coordinates: 62°39′N 28°43′E
- Basin countries: Finland
- Surface area: 219.54 km^{2} (84.76 sq mi)
- Average depth: 8.98 m (29.5 ft)
- Max. depth: 44 m (144 ft)
- Surface elevation: 101 m (331 ft)
- Settlements: Tuusniemi

Juojärvi is a lake in Finland. It is considered one of the cleanest lakes of the country. The New Valamo monastery is located on the shore of Juojärvi.
