= Tapani Tölli =

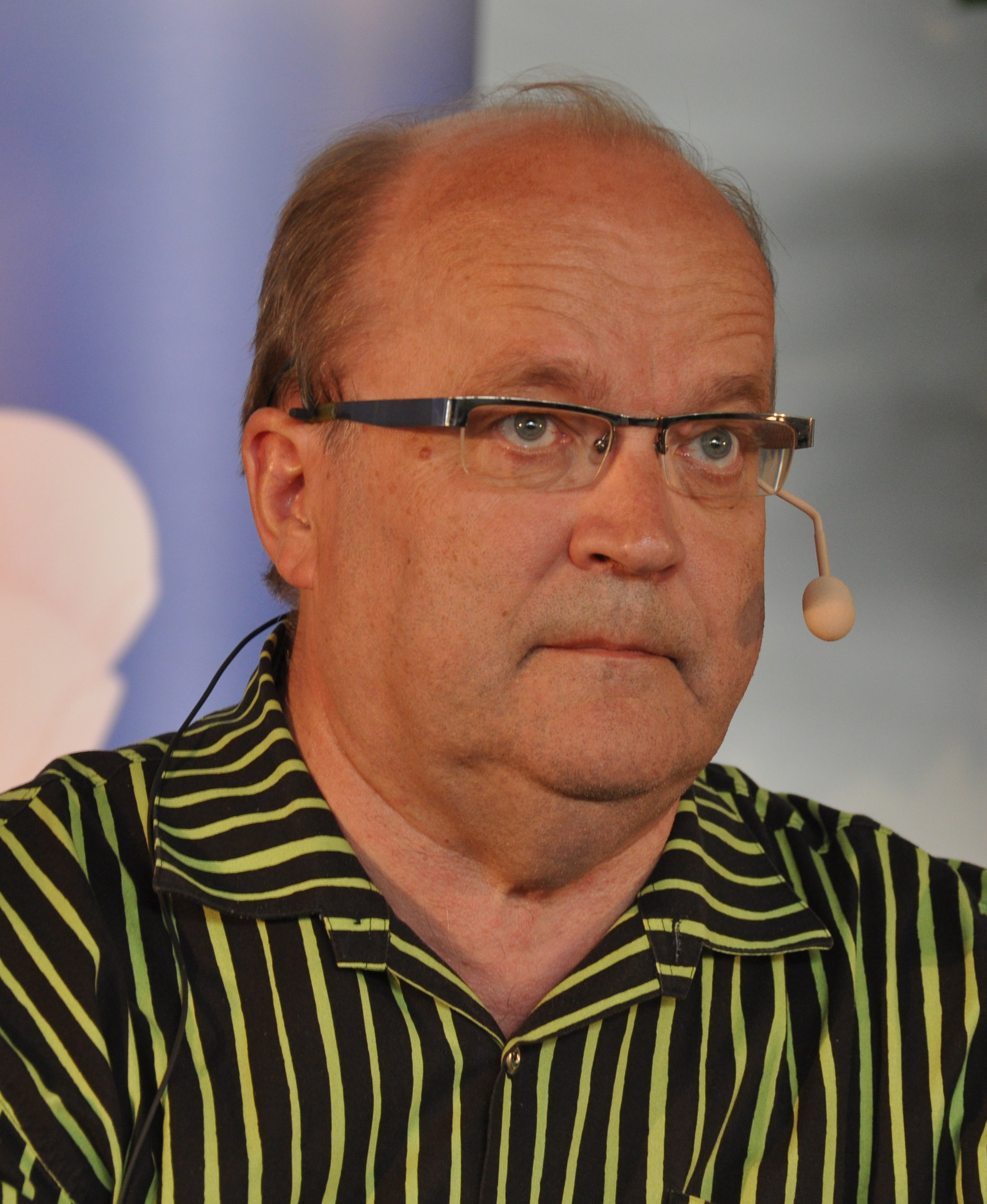

Minister of Public Administration and Local Government
- In office 22 June 2010 – 22 June 2011
- Prime Minister: Mari Kiviniemi
- Preceded by: Mari Kiviniemi
- Succeeded by: Henna Virkkunen

Personal details
- Born: 13 June 1951 (age 74) Sievi, Finland
- Party: Centre Party
- Spouse: Kaija Tölli

Tapani Olavi Tölli (born 13 June 1951 in Sievi, Finland) is a Finnish Member of Parliament from Tyrnävä representing the Centre Party. He has previously been the Tyrnävä municipal manager. Tölli has been the Minister for Public Administration and Local Government in the government led by Prime Minister Mari Kiviniemi, having been chosen by Kiviniemi to fill the vacancy left by herself. Tölli has been a Member of Parliament since the 2003 parliamentary elections. Tölli has a master's degree in political science. He has been married since 1981 and has six children. His military rank is major.
