= Pyhäselkä =

Former municipality of Finland

Coordinates: 62°26′00″N 29°58′10″E

Location of Pyhäselkä in Finland

Coat of arms of Pyhäselkä

Pyhäselkä is a former municipality of Finland, now part of Joensuu. It seat was located in Hammaslahti.

Pyhäselkä is located in the province of Eastern Finland and is part of the North Karelia region. The municipality had a population of 7,390 (2003) and covered an area of 351.58 km^{2} of which 71.38 km^{2} is water. The population density was 26.4 inhabitants per km^{2}.

The municipality was unilingually Finnish.

Pyhäselkä was consolidated, together with Eno, with Joensuu on January 1, 2009.
