= Hannes Tiainen =

Finnish agronomist, civil servant and politician (1914–2001)

Johannes (Hannes) Tiainen (9 February 1914 – 8 April 2001) was a Finnish agronomist, civil servant and politician, born in Sortavala. He was a member of the Social Democratic Party of Finland (SDP) After the SDP split in 1959, Tiainen joined the Social Democratic Union of Workers and Smallholders (TPSL). He served as Deputy Minister of Agriculture from 3 December 1952 to 9 July 1953 and from 5 May to 20 October 1954, as Deputy Minister of Transport and Public Works from 20 October 1954 to 27 May 1957 and as Deputy Minister of Social Affairs from 22 October 1954 to 27 May 1957.
