= Ministry of Agriculture and Forestry (Finland) =

Government ministry of Finland

- Finnish: maa- ja metsätalousministeriö Swedish: jord- och skogsbruksministeriet

Ministry overview
- Jurisdiction: Finnish Government
- Headquarters: Hallituskatu 3 A Helsinki
- Employees: 250
- Annual budget: €2.752 billion (2022)
- Minister responsible: Sari Essayah, Minister of Agriculture and Forestry
- Ministry executive: Pekka Pesonen
- Website: mmm.fi

The Ministry of Agriculture and Forestry (MMM, Finnish: maa- ja metsätalousministeriö, Swedish: jord- och skogsbruksministeriet) is one of the 12 ministries in the Finnish Government. Natural resources and their sustainable use are in the focus of this ministry. It also makes sure that Finland is self-sufficient in its food production even in a time of crisis, and that the food production and use of natural resources is sustainable, economically beneficial, and good for the well-being of the nation's citizens.

For 2022, the MMM's budget is €2.752.960.000. The ministry has about 250 employees, and 5,100 in the entire administrative sector. The size of the ministry's budget is approximately 2.8 billion euros.

== History ==
The predecessor of the Ministry of Agriculture and Forestry was founded by Alexander II in 1860, 57 years prior to Finland's independence. "Forestry" was added to the name and task of the ministry in 1971.

In 1983, environmental matters were moved to newly-founded Ministry of the Environment.
