= Ralf Törngren =

Finnish politician (1899–1961)

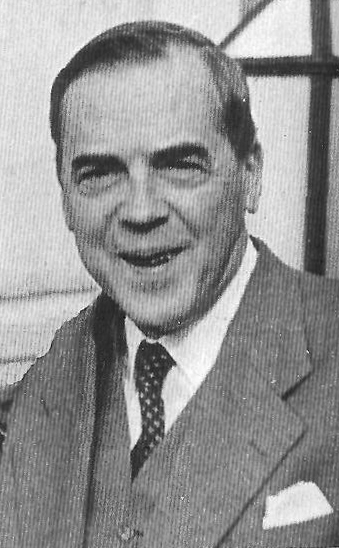

23rd Prime Minister of Finland
- In office 5 May 1954 – 20 October 1954
- President: Juho Kusti Paasikivi
- Preceded by: Sakari Tuomioja
- Succeeded by: Urho Kekkonen

Minister of Foreign Affairs
- In office 13 January 1959 – 16 May 1961
- Prime Minister: V. J. Sukselainen
- Preceded by: Karl-August Fagerholm
- Succeeded by: Ahti Karjalainen
- In office 3 March 1956 – 27 May 1957
- Prime Minister: Karl-August Fagerholm
- Preceded by: Johannes Virolainen
- Succeeded by: Johannes Virolainen
- In office 9 July 1953 – 5 May 1954
- Prime Minister: Urho Kekkonen; Sakari Tuomioja
- Preceded by: Urho Kekkonen
- Succeeded by: Urho Kekkonen

Minister of Finance
- In office 17 July 1945 – 29 July 1948
- Prime Minister: Juho Kusti Paasikivi; Mauno Pekkala
- Preceded by: Sakari Tuomioja
- Succeeded by: Onni Hiltunen

Deputy Prime Minister of Finland
- In office 13 January 1959 – 16 May 1961
- Prime Minister: V. J. Sukselainen
- Preceded by: Onni Hiltunen
- Succeeded by: Eemil Luukka

Personal details
- Born: Ralf Johan Gustaf Törngren; 1 March 1899 Oulu, Norra Österbotten, Finland
- Died: 16 May 1961 (aged 62) Turku, Egentliga, Finland
- Party: Swedish People's

Ralf Johan Gustaf Törngren (1 March 1899 – 16 May 1961) was a Finnish politician, born in Oulu. He was the party leader of the Swedish People's Party (1945–1955), a member of the Finnish parliament and the Prime Minister of Finland 5 May – 20 October 1954. In the Finnish presidential elections of 1956, he won 20 electoral votes.

He died in Turku, aged 62. A prize in his honor was founded in 2003 at the Åbo Akademi University in Turku, Finland.

Törngren's parents were Gustaf Reinhold Törngren, principal of Uleåborg svenska lyceet, and Naëma Swendelin. He became a student in 1917, a Bachelor of Arts in 1922 and a Master of Arts in 1927 at Åbo Akademi University. From 1927 to 1937 he was a teacher of social studies at the Åbo klassiska lyceum and a teacher of economics at the School of Economics at Åbo Akademi University.

== Career ==
- 1944–1945 Social minister
- 1945–1948 Minister of Finance
- 1950–1951 Social minister
- 1951 Second Finance minister
- 1951–1952 Social minister
- 1952–1953 Second Minister for Foreign Affairs
- 1953–1954 Minister of Foreign Affairs
- 1954 Prime Minister
- 1956–1957 Minister of Foreign Affairs
- 1959–1961 Minister of Foreign Affairs
- 1959–1961 Deputy Prime Minister

== Cabinets ==
- Törngren Cabinet

== Bibliography ==
- Åbo stad och Åboland i befolkningsstatistisk belysning (1927)
- Ångfartygsaktiebolaget Bore 1897−1927 (1927)
- Drag ur Åbo handels historia under sjuhundra år (1929)
- Finska Pappersföreningen 1892−1918 (1937).

== Awards ==
- First Class Commander of the White Rose of Finland, 6 December 1947
- Grand Cross of the Order of the Falcon, 24 April 1954
- Grand Cross of the White Rose of Finland, 6 December 1954
- Commander Grand Cross of the Order of Vasa, 2 October 1956
- Grand Cross of the Order of St. Olav, 1 July 1960
- Commander 1st Class of the Order of the Polar Star
- Grand Cross of the Order of the Dannebrog

Political offices
Preceded by Urho Kekkonen	Minister of Foreign Affairs; 1953–1954	Succeeded by Urho Kekkonen
Preceded by Sakari Tuomioja	Prime Minister of Finland; May 1954–October 1954	Succeeded by Urho Kekkonen
Preceded by Johannes Virolainen	Minister of Foreign Affairs; 1956–1957	Succeeded by Johannes Virolainen
Party political offices
Preceded by Ernst von Born	Chairman of the Swedish People's Party; 1945–1955	Succeeded by Ernst von Born
