= Deputy Prime Minister of Finland =

Deputy head of government of Finland

Deputy Prime Minister of Republic of Finland
- Suomen pääministerin sijainen Finlands statsministers ställföreträdare
- Insignia of the Prime Minister of Finland

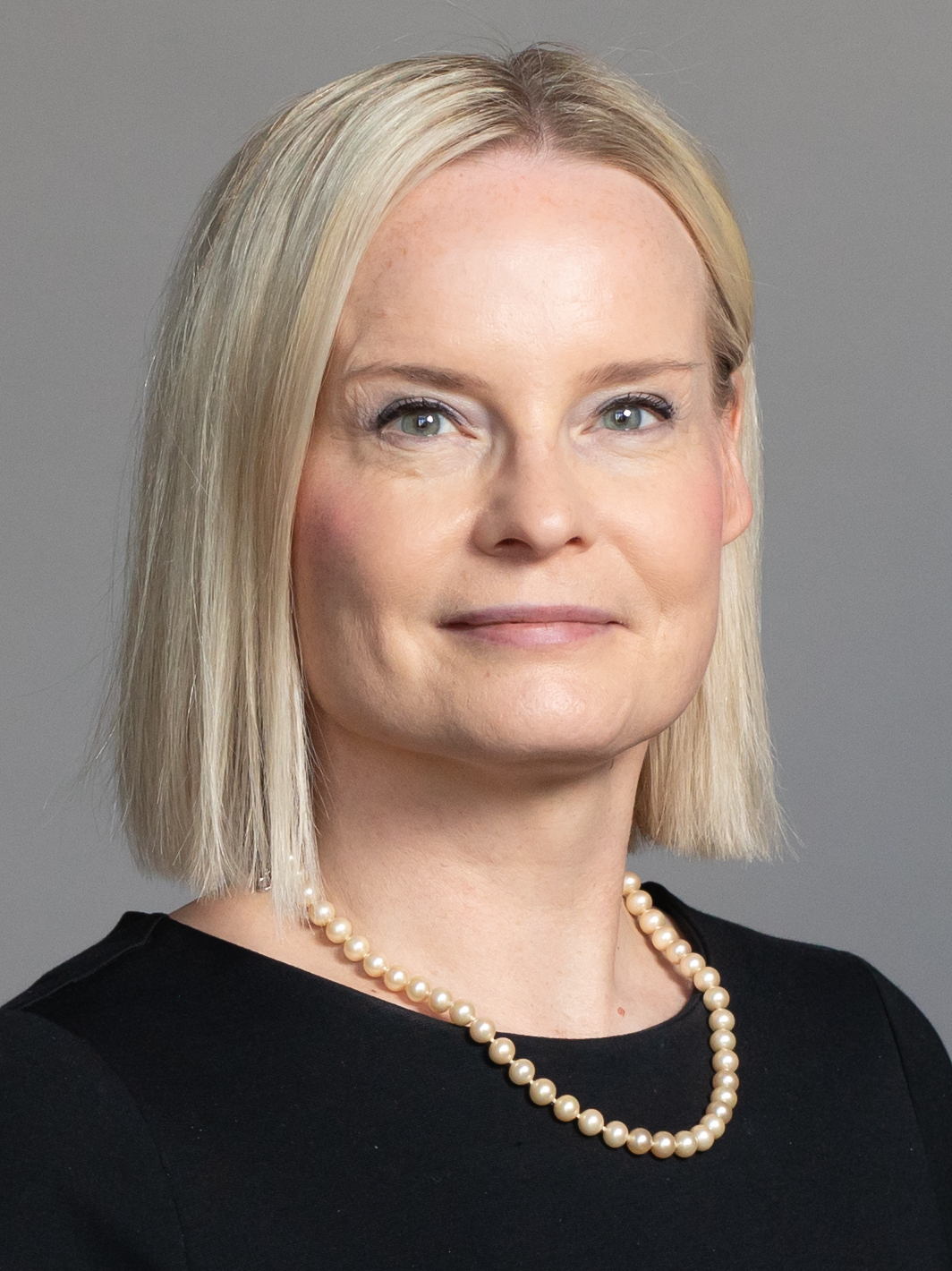
- Incumbent; Riikka Purra since 20 June 2023
- Appointer: Finnish Government
- Inaugural holder: Johannes Virolainen
- Formation: 1957

The Deputy Prime Minister of Finland (Finnish: Suomen pääministerin sijainen, Swedish: Finlands statsministers ställföreträdare, lit. Finland's Prime Minister's Substitute), officially titled the Minister deputising for the Prime Minister, is a member of the Finnish Government who becomes the acting Prime Minister if the Prime Minister becomes unable to discharge their duties. The Deputy Prime Minister is appointed by the Government and traditionally comes from the second largest party of a coalition government. They have often been the Minister of Finance as well. The current Deputy Prime Minister of Finland is Riikka Purra.

== List of deputy prime ministers of Finland ==
No.	Portrait	Name (Birth–Death)	Term of office		Party	Portfolio	Prime Minister
No.	Portrait	Name (Birth–Death)	Took office	Left office	Party	Portfolio	Prime Minister
1		Johannes Virolainen (1914–2000)	11 January 1957	27 May 1957	ML	Education	Fagerholm; SDP (1956–1957)
2		Nils Meinander (1910–1985)	27 May 1957	2 July 1957	RKP	Finance	Sukselainen; ML (1957)
3		Esa Kaitila (1909–1975)	2 July 1957	2 September 1957	KP	Trade and Industry	Sukselainen; ML (1957)
4		Aarre Simonen (1913–1977)	2 September 1957	31 October 1957	TPSL	Without portfolio	Sukselainen; ML (1957)
(1)		Johannes Virolainen (1914–2000)	31 October 1957	29 November 1957	ML	Foreign Affairs	Sukselainen; ML (1957)
5		Reino Oittinen (1912–1978)	29 November 1957	26 April 1958	Independent	Education	von Fieandt; Independent (1957–1958)
6		Tyyne Leivo-Larsson (1902–1977)	26 April 1958	29 August 1958	Independent	Without portfolio	Kuuskoski; Independent (1958)
(1)		Johannes Virolainen (1914–2000)	29 August 1958	4 December 1958	ML	Foreign Affairs	Fagerholm; SDP (1958–1959)
7		Onni Hiltunen (1895–1971)	4 December 1958	13 January 1959	SDP	Trade and Industry	Fagerholm; SDP (1958–1959)
8		Ralf Törngren (1899–1961)	13 January 1959	16 May 1961	RKP	Foreign Affairs	Sukselainen; ML (1959–1961)
9		Eemil Luukka (1892–1970)	19 May 1961	3 July 1961	ML	Interior	Sukselainen; ML (1959–1961)
10		Kauno Kleemola (1906–1965)	3 July 1961	14 July 1961	ML	Transportation	Luukka; ML (1961)
(9)		Eemil Luukka (1892–1970)	14 July 1961	13 April 1962	ML	Interior	Miettunen; ML (1961–1962)
(1)		Johannes Virolainen (1914–2000)	13 April 1962	18 December 1963	ML	Agriculture	Karjalainen; ML (1962–1963)
11		Aarne Nuorvala (1912–2013)	18 December 1963	8 June 1964	Independent	Prime Minister's Office	Lehto; Independent (1963–1964)
(5)		Reino Oittinen (1912–1978)	12 June 1964	12 September 1964	Independent	Education	Lehto; Independent (1963–1964)
12		Ahti Karjalainen (1923–1990)	12 September 1964	27 May 1966	KESK	Foreign Affairs	Virolainen; KESK (1964–1966)
(5)		Reino Oittinen (1912–1978)	27 May 1966	22 March 1968	SDP	Education	Paasio; SDP (1966–1968)
(1)		Johannes Virolainen (1914–2000)	22 March 1968	14 May 1970	KESK	Education	Koivisto; SDP (1968–1970)
13		Päiviö Hetemäki (1913–1980)	14 May 1970	15 July 1970	Independent	Finance	Aura; Independent (1970)
14		Veikko Helle (1911–2005)	15 July 1970	29 October 1971	SDP	Labour	Karjalainen; KESK (1970–1971)
(13)		Päiviö Hetemäki (1913–1980)	29 October 1971	23 February 1972	Independent	Finance	Aura; Independent (1971–1972)
15		Mauno Koivisto (1923–2017)	23 February 1972	4 September 1972	SDP	Bank of Finland	Paasio; SDP (1972)
(12)		Ahti Karjalainen (1923–1990)	4 September 1972	13 June 1975	KESK	Foreign Affairs	Sorsa; SDP (1972–1975)
16		Olavi J. Mattila (1918–2013)	13 June 1975	30 November 1975	Independent	Foreign Affairs	Liinamaa; Independent (1975)
17		Kalevi Sorsa (1930–2004)	30 November 1975	29 September 1976	SDP	Foreign Affairs	Miettunen; KESK (1975–1977)
(12)		Ahti Karjalainen (1923–1990)	29 September 1976	15 May 1977	KESK	Prime Minister's Office	Miettunen; KESK (1975–1977)
(1)		Johannes Virolainen (1914–2000)	15 May 1977	26 May 1979	KESK	Agriculture	Sorsa; SDP (1977–1979)
18		Eino Uusitalo (1924–2015)	26 May 1979	19 February 1982	KESK	Interior	Koivisto; SDP (1979–1982)
19		Ahti Pekkala (1924–2014)	19 February 1982	6 May 1983	KESK	Finance	Sorsa; SDP (1982–1987)
20		Paavo Väyrynen (born 1946)	6 May 1983	30 April 1987	KESK	Foreign Affairs	Sorsa; SDP (1982–1987)
(17)		Kalevi Sorsa (1930–2004)	30 April 1987	31 January 1989	SDP	Foreign Affairs	Holkeri; KOK (1987–1991)
21		Pertti Paasio (1939–2020)	1 February 1989	26 April 1991	SDP	Foreign Affairs	Holkeri; KOK (1987–1991)
22		Ilkka Kanerva (1948–2022)	26 April 1991	23 August 1991	KOK	Labour	Aho; KESK (1991–1995)
23		Pertti Salolainen (born 1940)	23 August 1991	13 April 1995	KOK	Foreign Trade	Aho; KESK (1991–1995)
24		Sauli Niinistö (born 1948)	13 April 1995	30 August 2001	KOK	Justice (1995–1996)	Lipponen; SDP (1995–2003)
24		Sauli Niinistö (born 1948)	13 April 1995	30 August 2001	KOK	Finance (1996–2001)	Lipponen; SDP (1995–2003)
25		Ville Itälä (born 1959)	30 August 2001	17 April 2003	KOK	Interior	Lipponen; SDP (1995–2003)
26		Antti Kalliomäki (born 1947)	17 April 2003	22 September 2005	SDP	Finance	Jäätteenmäki; KESK (2003)
26		Antti Kalliomäki (born 1947)	17 April 2003	22 September 2005	SDP	Finance	Vanhanen; KESK (2003–2010)
27		Eero Heinäluoma (born 1955)	23 September 2005	19 April 2007	SDP	Finance	Vanhanen; KESK (2003–2010)
28		Jyrki Katainen (born 1971)	19 April 2007	22 June 2011	KOK	Finance	Vanhanen; KESK (2003–2010)
28		Jyrki Katainen (born 1971)	19 April 2007	22 June 2011	KOK	Finance	Kiviniemi; KESK (2010–2011)
29		Jutta Urpilainen (born 1975)	22 June 2011	6 June 2014	SDP	Finance	Katainen; KOK (2011–2014)
30		Antti Rinne (born 1962)	6 June 2014	29 May 2015	SDP	Finance	Katainen; KOK (2011–2014)
30		Antti Rinne (born 1962)	6 June 2014	29 May 2015	SDP	Finance	Stubb; KOK (2014–2015)
31		Timo Soini (born 1962)	29 May 2015	28 June 2017	Finns	Foreign Affairs	Sipilä; KESK (2015–2019)
32		Petteri Orpo (born 1969)	28 June 2017	6 June 2019	KOK	Finance	Sipilä; KESK (2015–2019)
33		Mika Lintilä (born 1966)	6 June 2019	12 September 2019	KESK	Finance	Rinne; SDP (2019)
34		Katri Kulmuni (born 1987)	12 September 2019	9 June 2020	KESK	Economic Affairs (2019)	Rinne; SDP (2019)
34		Katri Kulmuni (born 1987)	12 September 2019	9 June 2020	KESK	Finance (2019–2020)	Marin; SDP (2019–2023)
35		Matti Vanhanen (born 1955)	9 June 2020	10 September 2020	KESK	Finance	Marin; SDP (2019–2023)
36		Annika Saarikko (born 1983)	10 September 2020	20 June 2023	KESK	Science and Culture (2020–2021)	Marin; SDP (2019–2023)
36		Annika Saarikko (born 1983)	10 September 2020	20 June 2023	KESK	Finance (2021–2023)	Marin; SDP (2019–2023)
37		Riikka Purra (born 1977)	20 June 2023	Incumbent	Finns	Finance	Orpo; KOK (since 2023)
