= Johannes Virolainen =

Prime minister of Finland from 1964 to 1966

Valtioneuvos Johannes Virolainen
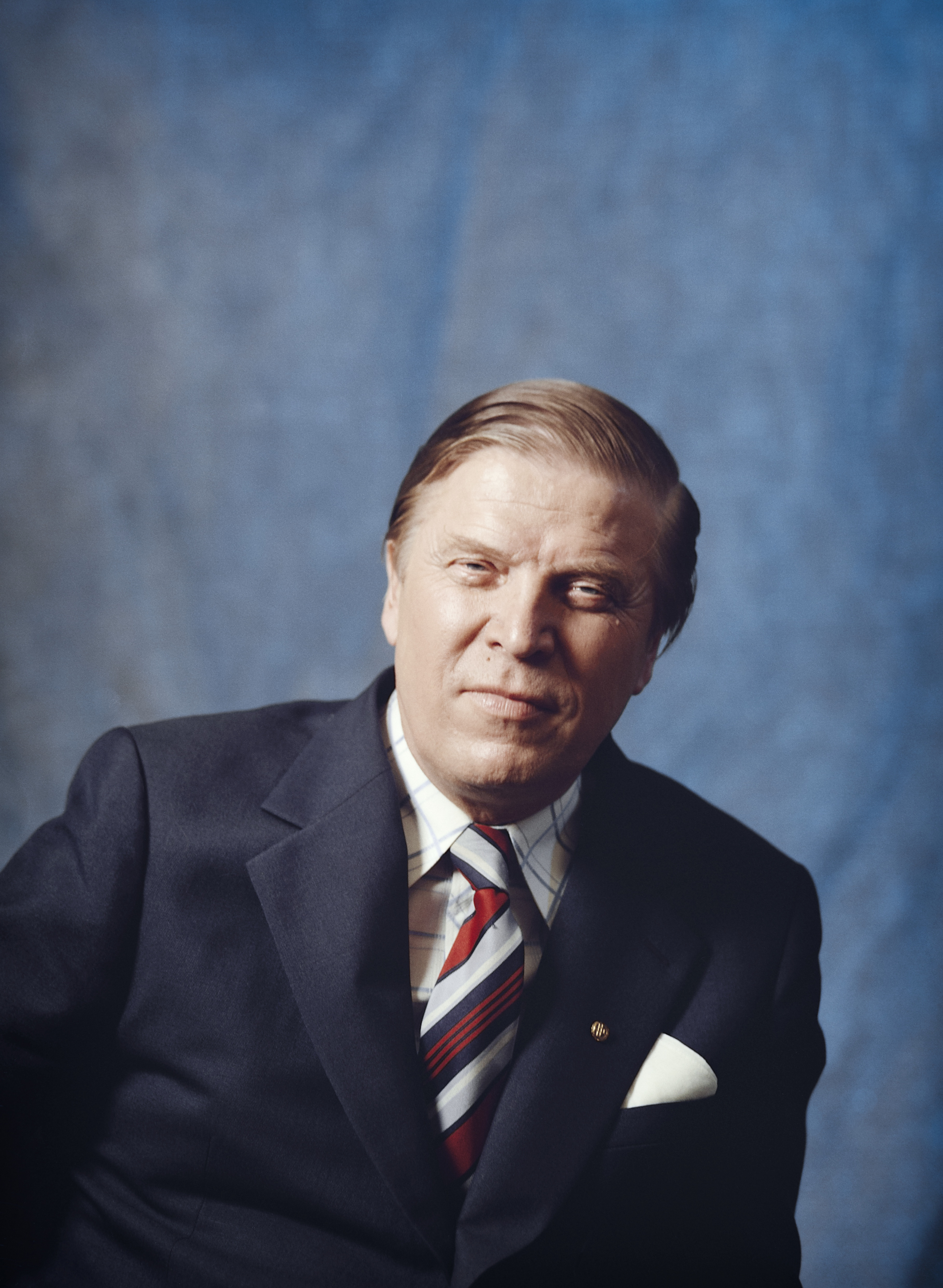
- Virolainen in 1975.

30th Prime Minister of Finland
- In office 12 September 1964 – 27 May 1966
- President: Urho Kekkonen
- Deputy: Ahti Karjalainen
- Preceded by: Reino R. Lehto
- Succeeded by: Rafael Paasio

Speaker of the Finnish Parliament
- In office 5 June 1979 – 25 March 1983
- Preceded by: Ahti Pekkala
- Succeeded by: Erkki Pystynen
- In office 3 June 1966 – 26 March 1968
- Preceded by: Rafael Paasio
- Succeeded by: V. J. Sukselainen

Minister of Foreign Affairs
- In office 29 August 1958 – 4 December 1958
- Prime Minister: Karl-August Fagerholm
- Preceded by: Paavo Hynninen
- Succeeded by: Karl-August Fagerholm
- In office 27 May 1957 – 29 November 1957
- Prime Minister: V. J. Sukselainen
- Preceded by: Ralf Törngren
- Succeeded by: Paavo Hynninen
- In office 20 October 1954 – 3 March 1956
- Prime Minister: Urho Kekkonen
- Preceded by: Urho Kekkonen
- Succeeded by: Ralf Törngren

Deputy Prime Minister of Finland
- In office 15 May 1977 – 26 May 1979
- Prime Minister: Kalevi Sorsa
- Preceded by: Ahti Karjalainen
- Succeeded by: Eino Uusitalo
- In office 22 March 1968 – 14 May 1970
- Prime Minister: Mauno Koivisto
- Preceded by: Reino Oittinen
- Succeeded by: Päiviö Hetemäki
- In office 13 April 1962 – 18 December 1963
- Prime Minister: Ahti Karjalainen
- Preceded by: Eemil Luukka
- Succeeded by: Aarne Nuorvala
- In office 29 August 1958 – 4 December 1958
- Prime Minister: Karl-August Fagerholm
- Preceded by: Tyyne Leivo-Larsson
- Succeeded by: Onni Hiltunen
- In office 31 October 1957 – 29 November 1957
- Prime Minister: V. J. Sukselainen
- Preceded by: Aarre Simonen
- Succeeded by: Reino Oittinen
- In office 11 January 1957 – 27 May 1957
- Prime Minister: Karl-August Fagerholm
- Preceded by: Position established
- Succeeded by: Nils Meinander

Minister of Education
- In office 3 March 1956 – 27 May 1957
- Prime Minister: Karl-August Fagerholm
- Preceded by: Kerttu Saalasti
- Succeeded by: Kerttu Saalasti
- In office 5 May 1954 – 20 October 1954
- Prime Minister: Ralf Törngren
- Preceded by: Arvo Salminen
- Succeeded by: Kerttu Saalasti
- In office 9 July 1953 – 17 November 1953
- Prime Minister: Urho Kekkonen
- Preceded by: Reino Oittinen
- Succeeded by: Arvo Salminen

Personal details
- Born: 31 January 1914 Viipurin maalaiskunta, Finland
- Died: 11 December 2000 (aged 86) Lohja, Finland
- Party: Agrarian League/Centre Party
- Spouse(s): Kaarina Virolainen; Kyllikki Virolainen (1981–2000)

Johannes Virolainen

Minister of Agriculture
- In office 29 September 1976 – 26 May 1979
- Prime Minister: Martti Miettunen; Kalevi Sorsa
- Preceded by: Heimo Linna
- Succeeded by: Taisto Tähkämaa
- In office 14 July 1961 – 18 December 1963
- Prime Minister: Martti Miettunen; Ahti Karjalainen
- Preceded by: Juho Jaakkola
- Succeeded by: Samuli Suomela

Minister of Finance
- In office 4 September 1972 – 13 June 1975
- Prime Minister: Kalevi Sorsa
- Preceded by: Mauno Koivisto
- Succeeded by: Heikki Tuominen

Johannes Virolainen (pronounced [ˈjohɑnːes ˈʋirolɑi̯nen]; 31 January 1914 – 11 December 2000) was a Finnish politician and who served as 30th Prime Minister of Finland, helped inhabitants of Karelia, and opposed the use of alcohol.

Virolainen was born near Viipuri. After the Continuation War Virolainen moved to Lohja, but he remained one of the leaders of the evacuated Karelians, and never gave up the hope that Soviet Union and later Russia would return Finnish Karelia to Finland. After World War II Virolainen became the first president of the Maaseudun Nuorten Liitto later known as Finnish Centre Youth, which has been educating dozens of ministers and hundreds of members of the Finnish Parliament.

He was also famous as a teetotaller, saying that the only circumstance where he would countenance downing a toast would be if Karelia was ceded back to Finland. He was fond of repeating the line, and it has been claimed that he said it to, among others, Nikita Khrushchev and Anastas Mikoyan on the Soviet side, to fend off needling by them for lacking the Soviet style of social graces.

A member of the Agrarian League (later the Centre Party), Virolainen was a Member of Parliament 1945–1983 and 1987–1991.

He had a long ministerial career, serving as Assistant Minister of the Interior 1950–1951; Minister at the Council of State Chancellery 1951, and 1956–1957; Minister of Education 1953, 1954, 1956–1957, and 1968–1970; Minister of Foreign Affairs 1954–1956, 1957, and 1958; Deputy Prime Minister 1957, 1958, 1962–1963, 1968–1970, and 1977–1979; Minister of Agriculture 1961–1963; Minister of Finance 1972–1975; and Minister of Agriculture and Forestry 1976–1979.

Virolainen was Prime Minister from 1964–1966, presiding over a coalition government comprising the Centre Party, National Coalition Party, Swedish People's Party, and Finnish People's Party. He also served as Speaker of the Parliament from 1966–1968 and 1979–1983. Virolainen is considered one of the strongest Centre Party leaders in the post-war era, second only to Urho Kekkonen.

Virolainen had a variable, often tense relationship with President Kekkonen, who considered him an unreliable, too frequently opinion-changing politician. Virolainen himself claimed that the two basic reasons for their tense relationship were that he had never been a member of the right-wing, nationalist Academic Karelia Society (Kekkonen had, until 1932), and that he was a teetotaller (Kekkonen drank and at times smoked). Moreover, Kekkonen was unconvinced that Virolainen always supported his official foreign policy toward the Soviet Union. In June 1979, he publicly rebuked Virolainen, who was then Speaker of Parliament, for "bearing a false testimony" about Finland's foreign policy, and for harming Finland's international relations. Shortly before this harsh accusation, Virolainen had suggested in an interview by the Suomen Kuvalehti magazine that the National Coalition Party had remained in the opposition despite its major victory in the 1979 parliamentary elections because of "general reasons" or foreign policy.

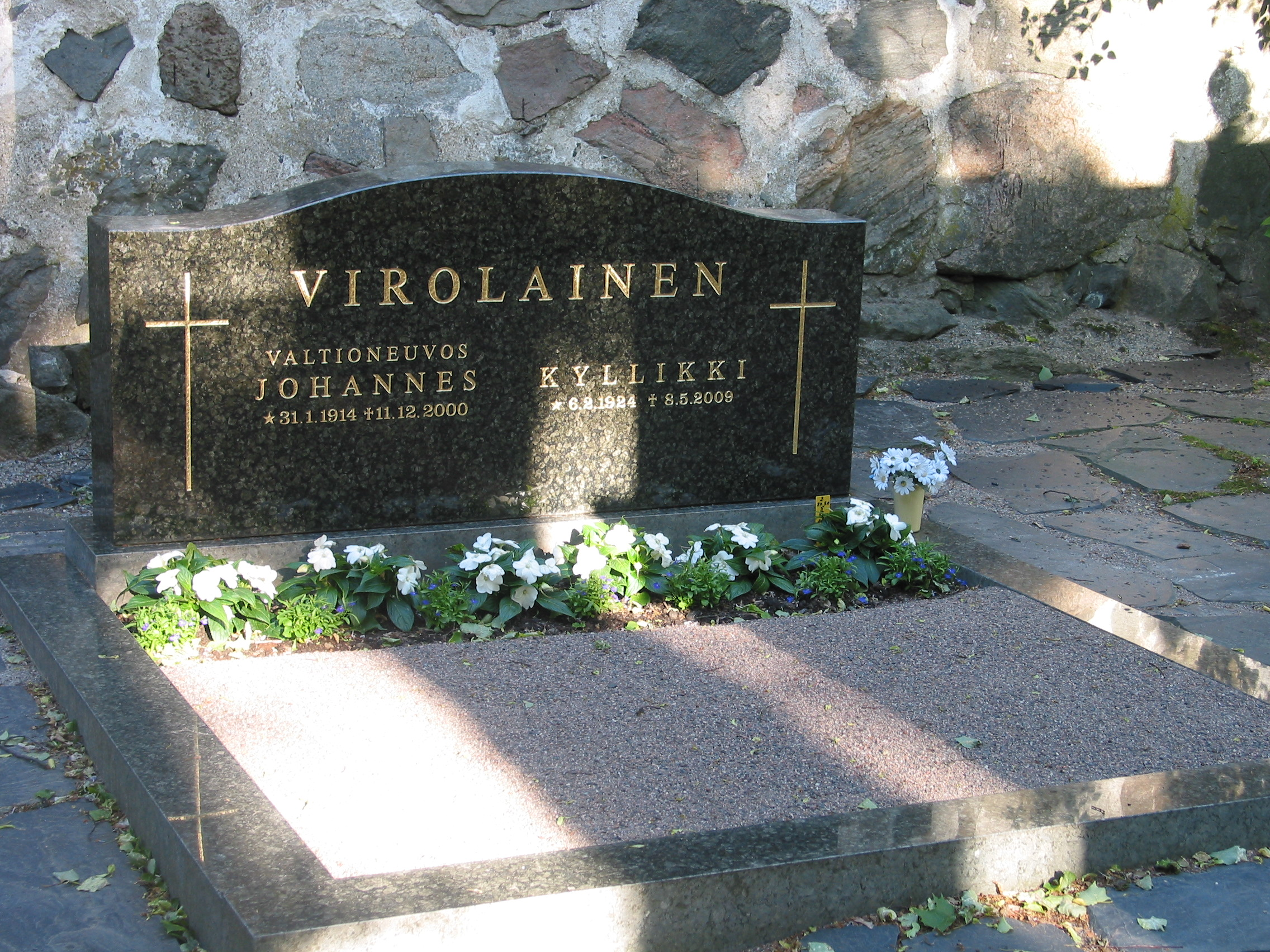
Grave of Johannes Virolainen and his wife Kyllikki Virolainen in Lohja, Finland.

After Kekkonen resigned in October 1981, Virolainen became the Centre Party's presidential candidate, but he was handily defeated in the 1982 presidential elections by the Social Democratic candidate, Mauno Koivisto. In the 1983 parliamentary elections, Virolainen was one of the major-party deputies to lose their seats because of allegations that he had illegally received the parliamentary daily allowance for commuting between Helsinki and his official hometown. Determined to finish his parliamentary career in style, he was re-elected to Parliament in the 1987 parliamentary elections. During his last electoral term, Virolainen supported constitutional amendment proposals that reduced the President's power.

During his nine-year retirement from Parliament, Virolainen still actively followed the Finnish political affairs and sometimes gave interviews on current topics (the Finnish broadcasting corporation YLE "Living Archives" / Elävä arkisto, search words: "Johannes Virolainen"). He also wrote some volumes of political memoirs, including "A Defence of Politics" (Politiikan puolustus), "From the Path" (Polun varrelta), and "The Pictures Move" (Kuvat kulkevat).

== Cabinets ==
- Virolainen Cabinet

Political offices
Preceded by Urho Kekkonen	Minister of Foreign Affairs; 1954–1956	Succeeded by Ralf Törngren
Preceded by Ralf Törngren	Minister of Foreign Affairs; 1957	Succeeded by Paavo Hynninen
Preceded by Paavo Hynninen	Minister of Foreign Affairs; 1958	Succeeded by Karl-August Fagerholm
Preceded by Reino Ragnar Lehto	Prime Minister of Finland; 1964–1966	Succeeded by Rafael Paasio
Preceded by Rafael Paasio	Speaker of the Parliament of Finland; 1966–1968	Succeeded by V. J. Sukselainen
Preceded by Ahti Pekkala	Speaker of the Parliament of Finland; 1979–1982	Succeeded by Erkki Pystynen
