= V. J. Sukselainen =

Finnish politician (1906–1995)

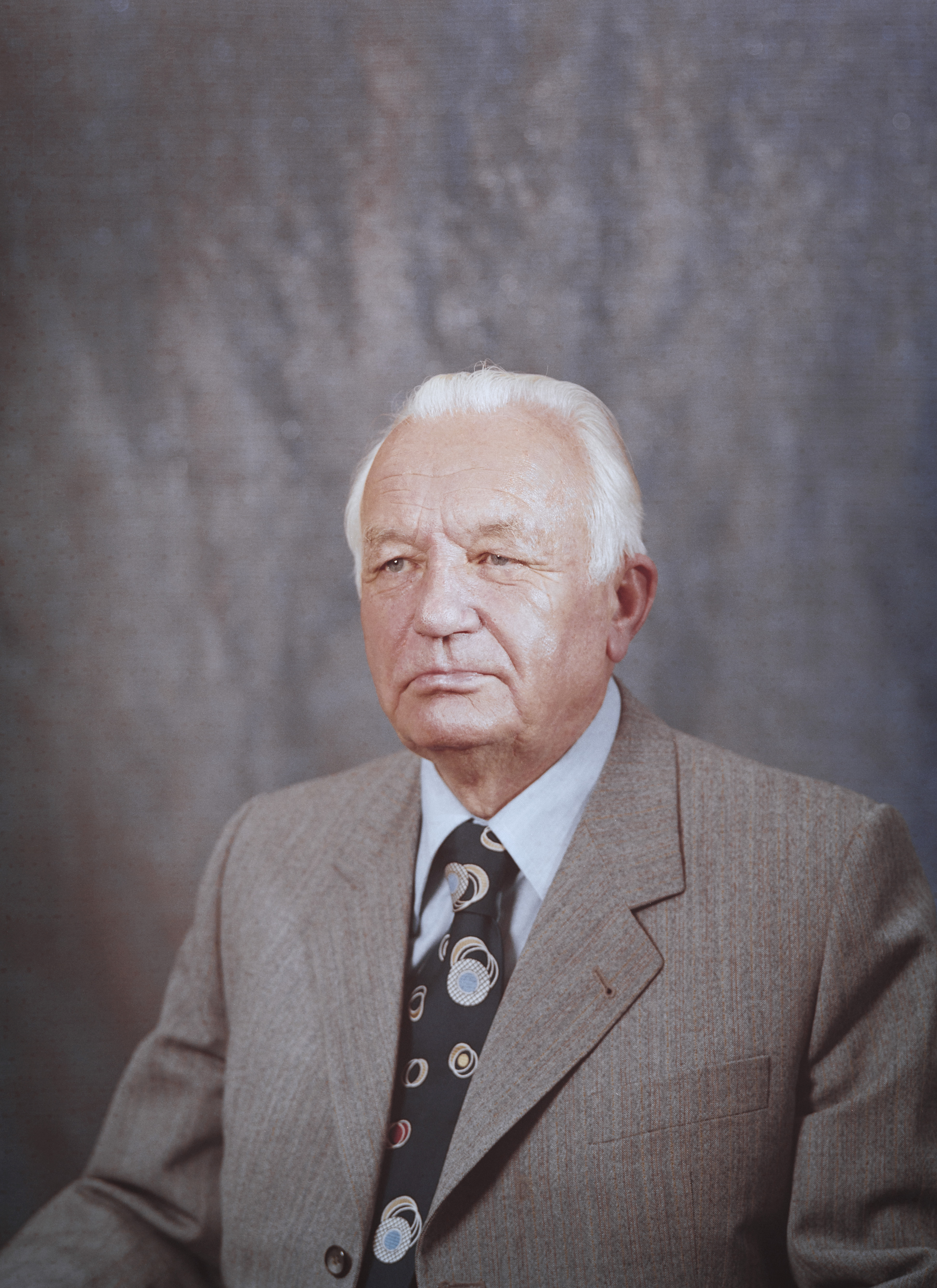
- Portrait from 1981

24th Prime Minister of Finland
- In office 27 May 1957 – 29 November 1957
- President: Urho Kekkonen
- Deputy: Nils Meinander; Esa Kaitila; Aarre Simonen; Johannes Virolainen
- Preceded by: Karl-August Fagerholm
- Succeeded by: Rainer von Fieandt
- In office 13 January 1959 – 14 July 1961
- President: Urho Kekkonen
- Deputy: Ralf Törngren; Eemil Luukka; Kauno Kleemola
- Preceded by: Karl-August Fagerholm
- Succeeded by: Martti Miettunen

Minister of the Interior
- In office 17 January 1951 – 17 March 1953
- Prime Minister: Urho Kekkonen
- Preceded by: Urho Kekkonen
- Succeeded by: Heikki Kannisto

Minister of Finance
- In office 5 May 1954 – 20 October 1954
- Prime Minister: Ralf Törngren
- Preceded by: Tuure Junnila
- Succeeded by: Penna Tervo
- In office 17 March 1950 – 17 January 1951
- Prime Minister: Urho Kekkonen
- Preceded by: Onni Hiltunen
- Succeeded by: Onni Hiltunen

Minister of Foreign Affairs Acting
- In office 16 May 1961 – 19 June 1961
- Prime Minister: Himself
- Preceded by: Ralf Törngren
- Succeeded by: Ahti Karjalainen

Personal details
- Born: Viero Johannes Saari; 12 October 1906 Paimio, Finland
- Died: 6 April 1995 (aged 88) Espoo, Finland
- Party: Agrarian League/Centre Party
- Education: University of Helsinki

Vieno Johannes (V.J.) "Jussi" Sukselainen (12 October 1906 – 6 April 1995; surname until 1928 Saari), was twice Prime Minister of Finland and four times Speaker of the Parliament. He was President of the Nordic Council in 1972 and 1977. He also served as the fourth Director General of Kela, the Finnish social security agency, from 1954 until 1971.

Sukselainen was born in Paimio and died in Espoo. He was a member of the Centre Party.

== Cabinets ==
- Sukselainen I Cabinet
- Sukselainen II Cabinet

Political offices
Preceded by Karl-August Fagerholm	Speaker of the Parliament of Finland; 1956–1957	Succeeded by Karl-August Fagerholm
Preceded by Karl-August Fagerholm	Prime Minister of Finland; 1957	Succeeded by Rainer von Fieandt
Preceded by Karl-August Fagerholm	Speaker of the Parliament of Finland; 1958	Succeeded by Karl-August Fagerholm
Preceded by Karl-August Fagerholm	Prime Minister of Finland; 1959–1961	Succeeded by Martti Miettunen
Preceded by Johannes Virolainen	Speaker of the Parliament of Finland; 1968–1969	Succeeded by Rafael Paasio
Preceded by Rafael Paasio	Speaker of the Parliament of Finland; 1972–1975	Succeeded by Veikko Helle
