= Juho Niukkanen =

Finnish politician (1888–1954)

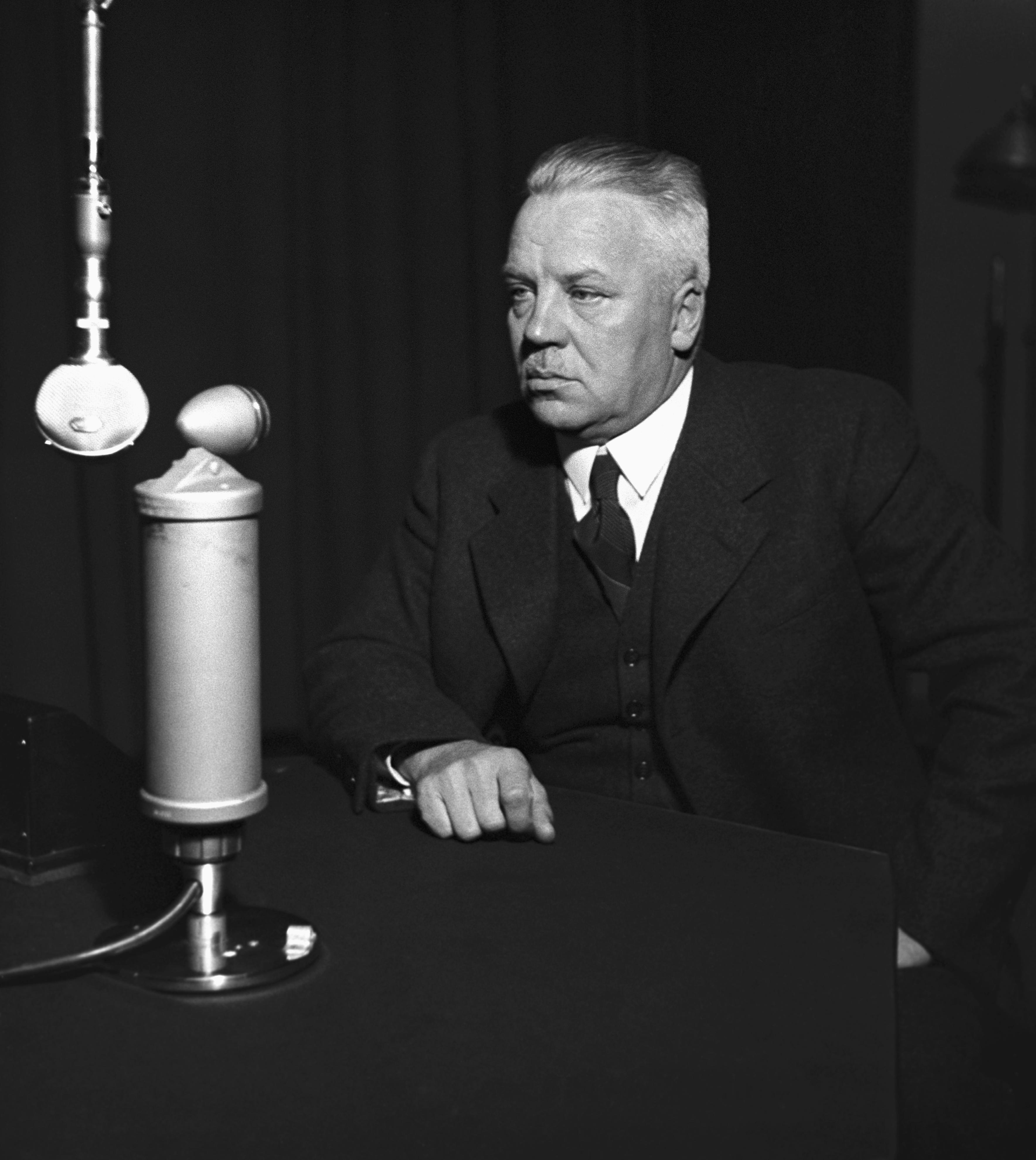
- Niukkanen in the 1930s
- Born: Juhana Niukkanen; 27 July 1888; Kirvu, Grand Duchy of Finland
- Died: 17 May 1954 (aged 65); Helsinki, Finland
- Occupations: Politician, farmer
- Known for: Minister of Defence of Finland (1937–1940)
- Political party: Agrarian League

Juho Niukkanen (27 July 1888 – 17 May 1954) was a Finnish politician of the Agrarian League (Maalaisliitto). He served as a member of parliament from 1916 to 1933 and again from 1936 to 1954, and held office in numerous cabinets, including three terms as Minister of Finance and as Minister of Defence during the Winter War (1937–1940).

A leading figure in the Agrarian League before the Second World War, Niukkanen was particularly influential as the principal political representative of the Karelians within the party. He played a decisive role in the elections of three Finnish presidents and is best remembered for his determined efforts to maintain Finland's military preparedness on the eve of the Winter War, often against the wishes of his own government.

== Background and early career ==
Niukkanen was born into an old Karelian farming family in Kirvu (Swedish: Kirvus), a parish in southern Karelia that became part of the Soviet Union after the Second World War. His father Kustaa Niukkanen was a sturdy farmer, and his mother Maria Apunen also came from a local farming family. At his father's insistence, Juho's formal schooling was limited to a craft school, although his teachers considered him academically gifted; he later attended a folk high school. The youth association in Kirvu, strongly influenced by Santeri Alkio, was an important early formative environment.

From the youth movement, Niukkanen moved naturally into the Agrarian League, which began organising in Karelia in 1906–1908. His organisational work helped make the party more active in southern Karelia than anywhere else in Finland. He was elected to the Agrarian League's central committee in 1914, a position he held until his death.

In 1915 Niukkanen began recruiting volunteers for the Jäger Movement, which sent young Finns to receive military training in Germany. In December 1916 he was forced to flee from the Russian gendarmes to the home of the parliamentarian J. A. Heikkinen – known as Hallan Ukko – in Hyrynsalmi, famous for hiding Jägers en route to Germany. The flight ended with the Russian Revolution of March 1917. He had been elected to the Diet in 1916, and within the Agrarian League's parliamentary group he was one of the most determined advocates of Finnish independence in 1917.

== Political career in the inter-war period ==
Niukkanen served as a minister in ten cabinets between the early 1920s and 1953, although he never became prime minister. According to his biographer Juhani Mylly, this was largely because he was not regarded as sufficiently conciliatory and moderate: he could be both shrewd and ruthless in pursuit of his goals, and was particularly known for his ability to bring down governments. By the late 1920s his reputation was such that no prudent prime minister was willing to leave him in opposition.

Niukkanen played a significant part in several Finnish presidential elections. In 1925 he engineered the election of Lauri Kristian Relander by sidelining the more senior Agrarian leaders Kyösti Kallio and J. E. Sunila and assembling an unusually broad coalition. His best-known strategic achievement, however, was the election of P. E. Svinhufvud as president in 1931, despite the fact that K. J. Ståhlberg had clearly greater support among the Agrarian electors. Niukkanen judged that the conservative Svinhufvud would have the authority to curb the far-right Lapua Movement, whereas the election of Ståhlberg might escalate political violence.

During the Mäntsälä rebellion of 1932, an attempted coup by Lapua Movement supporters, Niukkanen demanded from the outset that the uprising be suppressed, by force if necessary. He was among the most resolute members of the cabinet on this question. Later in the 1930s he worked actively for a purge of the Civil Guard of far-right elements. In autumn 1936 he also contributed substantially to the launch of the so-called "red earth" cooperation between the Agrarian League and the Social Democrats, a coalition pattern that would dominate Finnish politics for decades.

== Minister of Defence during the Winter War ==
Niukkanen's tenure as Minister of Defence under prime minister A. K. Cajander from 1937 to 1940 was the high point of his political career. After negotiations between Finland and the Soviet Union in Moscow broke down on 13 November 1939, the Cajander government did not believe that a Soviet attack was imminent, at least not during the winter. Finance minister Väinö Tanner proposed reducing both the troops and the defence budget, and foreign minister Eljas Erkko proposed demobilising about half the army for diplomatic and economic reasons.

Niukkanen strongly opposed any demobilisation and threatened to resign – a threat that, together with a similar one from Marshal Gustaf Mannerheim, helped delay the cuts. He pushed an additional defence funding programme through the Agrarian League's parliamentary group, and under his leadership the defence ministry purchased anti-aircraft guns, anti-aircraft shells and aircraft without formal parliamentary appropriations and exceeded the budgets for ammunition and fortification work. According to BLF, the state of Finnish defences at the outbreak of the Winter War would have been even worse without his determination and stubbornness. As a Karelian, he opposed the Moscow Peace Treaty and the resulting territorial cessions to the very end.

Niukkanen later set out his account of these events in the book Talvisodan puolustusministeri ("Minister of Defence during the Winter War", 1951), in which he was critical of Sweden's role in the Moscow peace negotiations of 1940.

== Post-war years ==
Niukkanen never quite found his place in post-war Finland. The loss of his home district of Kirvu and most of Karelia to the Soviet Union deprived him of the strong regional power base that had underpinned his influence within the Agrarian League. His health also deteriorated: he lost a leg to gangrene in 1943, suffered a heart attack and had a goitre. He nevertheless remained important as a spokesman for the evacuated Karelians.

When Urho Kekkonen formed an Agrarian minority cabinet in 1953, Niukkanen returned to office as Minister of Finance. The result was the so-called "Niukkanen budget", which proposed cutting state expenditure by a quarter compared to the previous year. Although parliament eventually transformed the proposed savings of 28 billion markka into a 3-billion-markka increase, the budget temporarily halted the growth of the state bureaucracy. Niukkanen was elected to parliament for the last time in early 1954 and died unexpectedly of a heart attack a few months later.

== Personal life ==
Niukkanen married Wivi Hupli in 1918. His surname was a frequent subject of puns in Finnish political commentary, as it derives from the adjective niukka ("scant", "meagre", "frugal").

== Sources ==
- Juhani Mylly. "Juho Niukkanen". Biografiskt lexikon för Finland (in Swedish). Helsingfors: Svenska litteratursällskapet i Finland. urn:NBN:fi:sls-4207-1416928956813.

| Preceded by Hannes Ryömä | Minister of Finance (Finland); 1927–1928 | Succeeded by Hugo Relander |
| Preceded by Hugo Relander | Minister of Finance (Finland); 1936–1937 | Succeeded by Väinö Tanner |
| Preceded by Arvi Oksala | Minister of Defence (Finland); 1937–1940 | Succeeded by Rudolf Walden |
| Preceded by Viljo Rantala | Minister of Finance (Finland); 1953 | Succeeded by Tuure Junnila |
