= Päiviö Hetemäki =

Finnish politician (1913–1980)

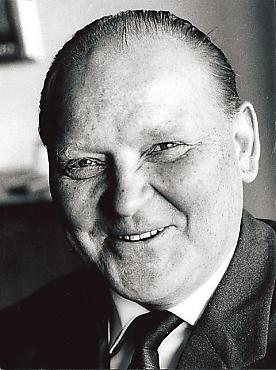
- Hetemäki in 1965

Deputy Prime Minister of Finland
- In office 29 October 1971 – 23 February 1972
- Prime Minister: Teuvo Aura
- Preceded by: Veikko Helle
- Succeeded by: Mauno Koivisto
- In office 14 May 1970 – 15 July 1970
- Prime Minister: Teuvo Aura
- Preceded by: Johannes Virolainen
- Succeeded by: Veikko Helle

Minister of Finance
- In office 29 October 1971 – 23 February 1972
- Prime Minister: Teuvo Aura
- Preceded by: Carl Olof Tallgren
- Succeeded by: Mauno Koivisto
- In office 14 May 1970 – 15 July 1970
- Prime Minister: Teuvo Aura
- Preceded by: Eino Raunio
- Succeeded by: Carl Olof Tallgren
- In office 29 August 1958 – 13 January 1959
- Prime Minister: Karl-August Fagerholm
- Preceded by: Ilmo Nurmela
- Succeeded by: Wiljam Sarjala

Minister of Defence
- In office 17 November 1953 – 5 May 1954
- Prime Minister: Sakari Tuomioja
- Preceded by: Kauno Kleemola
- Succeeded by: Emil Skog

Member of the Finnish Parliament
- In office 6 April 1945 – 19 February 1962
- Constituency: Vaasa

Personal details
- Born: 8 July 1913 Jyväskylä, Finland
- Died: 12 May 1980 (aged 66) Helsinki, Finland
- Party: National Coalition
- Spouse: Elli Leila Syvähuoko (m. 1945)

Päiviö Hetemäki (8 July 1913 in Jyväskylä – 12 May 1980) was a politician of the National Coalition Party in Finland. He served four times as a minister in the Finnish Council of State between 1953 and 1972. Hetemäki was also the chairman of the Confederation of Finnish Industries.

He also served in the Board of the Bank of Finland 1971–1977.
