= Reino Oittinen =

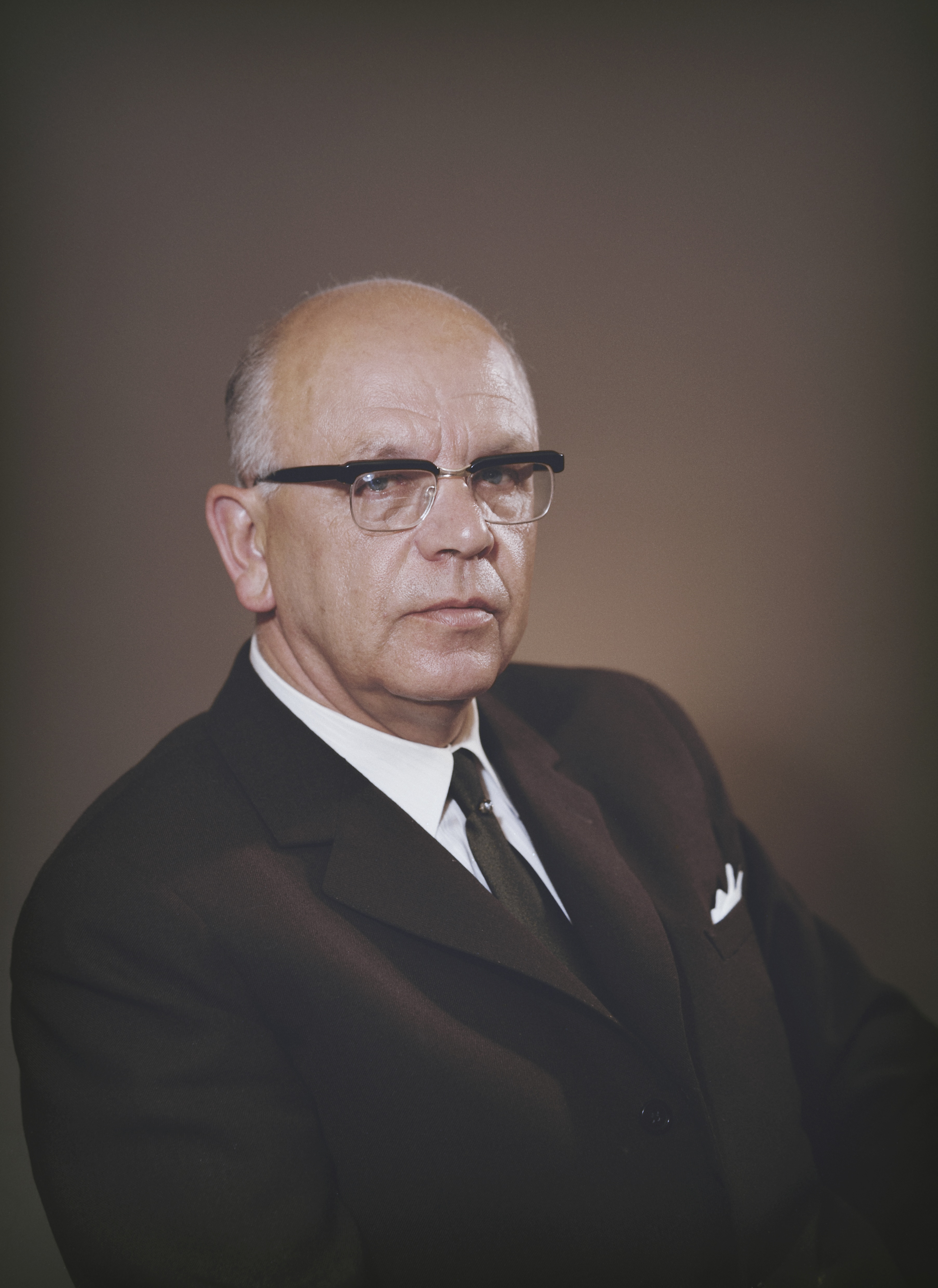
- Oittinen in 1969.

Minister of Education
- In office 27 May 1966 – 22 March 1968
- Prime Minister: Rafael Paasio
- Preceded by: Jussi Saukkonen
- Succeeded by: Johannes Virolainen
- In office 18 December 1963 – 12 September 1964
- Prime Minister: Reino R. Lehto
- Preceded by: Armi Hosia
- Succeeded by: Jussi Saukkonen
- In office 29 November 1957 – 26 April 1958
- Prime Minister: Rainer von Fieandt
- Preceded by: Kerttu Saalasti
- Succeeded by: Kustaa Vilkuna
- In office 20 September 1951 – 9 July 1953
- Prime Minister: Urho Kekkonen
- Preceded by: Lennart Heljas
- Succeeded by: Johannes Virolainen
- In office 29 July 1948 – 17 March 1950
- Prime Minister: Karl-August Fagerholm
- Preceded by: Lennart Heljas
- Succeeded by: Lennart Heljas

Deputy Prime Minister of Finland
- In office 27 May 1966 – 22 March 1968
- Prime Minister: Rafael Paasio
- Preceded by: Ahti Karjalainen
- Succeeded by: Johannes Virolainen
- In office 12 June 1964 – 12 September 1964
- Prime Minister: Reino R. Lehto
- Preceded by: Aarne Nuorvala
- Succeeded by: Ahti Karjalainen
- In office 29 November 1957 – 26 April 1958
- Prime Minister: Rainer von Fieandt
- Preceded by: Johannes Virolainen
- Succeeded by: Tyyne Leivo-Larsson

Personal details
- Born: Reino Henrik Oittinen; 26 July 1912 Helsinki, Finland
- Died: 1 March 1978 (aged 65) Helsinki, Finland
- Party: Social Democratic
- Spouse: Ellen Adele Valtonen (m. 1935)

Reino Henrik Oittinen (26 July 1912, Helsinki – 1 March 1978) was a Finnish politician from the Social Democratic Party.

== Career ==
In the 1930s, Oittinen participated in the municipal politics in Tampere. He was chosen as Finnish Minister of Education on four occasions: 1948–1950, 1951–1953, 1957–1958 and 1966–1968. Oittinen was also Deputy Prime Minister in three cabinets, those of 1957–1958, 1963–1964 and 1966–1968. He also served as the director general of National Board of General Education from 1950 to 1972. Oittinen received the honorary title of Minister in 1971.

== Family ==
Oittinen was the nephew of the trade union activists and politicians Ida Vihuri and Kaisa Hiilelä.
