= Minister of Finance (Finland) =

Finnish cabinet position

The Minister of Finance (Finnish: valtiovarainministeri [ˈʋɑltioˌʋɑrɑi̯nˌministeri], Swedish: finansminister) is one of the Finnish Government's ministers. The Minister of Finance is responsible for maintaining Finland's fiscal policies and oversees the Ministry of Finance. The Orpo Cabinet's incumbent Minister of Finance is Riikka Purra.

== List of ministers of finance ==
Portrait		Minister of Finance (Born-Died)	Term			Political party	Prime Minister
Portrait		Minister of Finance (Born-Died)	Took office	Left office	Duration	Political party	Prime Minister
1	Juhani Arajärvi	Juhani Arajärvi (1867–1941)	27 November 1917	27 November 1918	1 year, 0 days	Finnish	Pehr Evind Svinhufvud (Young Finnish) (27 November 1917 – 27 May 1918); Juho Kusti Paasikivi (Finnish) (27 May 1918 – 27 November 1918)
2	Kaarlo Castrén	Kaarlo Castrén (1860–1938)	27 November 1918	17 April 1919	141 days	National Progressive	Lauri Ingman (NCP)
3	August Ramsay	August Ramsay (1859–1943)	17 April 1919	15 August 1919	120 days	RKP	Kaarlo Castrén (National Progressive)
4	Johannes Lundson	Johannes Lundson (1867–1939)	15 August 1919	15 March 1920	213 days	National Progressive	Juho Vennola (National Progressive)
5	Jonathan Wartiovaara	Jonathan Wartiovaara (1875–1937)	15 March 1920	9 April 1921	1 year, 25 days	National Coalition	Rafael Erich (NCP)
6	Risto Ryti	Risto Ryti (1889–1956)	9 April 1921	2 June 1922	1 year, 54 days	National Progressive	Juho Vennola (National Progressive)
7	Ernst Gråsten	Ernst Gråsten (1865–1942)	2 June 1922	14 November 1922	165 days	Independent	Aimo Cajander (Ind)
(6)	Risto Ryti	Risto Ryti (1889–1956)	14 November 1922	18 January 1924	1 year, 65 days	National Progressive	Kyösti Kallio (Agrarian)
8	Hugo Relander	Hugo Relander (1865–1947)	18 January 1924	31 May 1924	134 days	Independent	Aimo Cajander (Ind)
9	Yrjö Pulkkinen	Yrjö Pulkkinen (1875–1945)	31 May 1924	31 March 1925	304 days	National Coalition	Lauri Ingman (NCP)
(8)	Hugo Relander	Hugo Relander (1865–1947)	31 March 1925	31 December 1925	275 days	Independent	Antti Tulenheimo (NCP)
10	Kyösti Järvinen	Kyösti Järvinen (1869–1957)	31 December 1925	13 December 1926	347 days	National Coalition	Kyösti Kallio (Agrarian)
11	Hannes Ryömä	Hannes Ryömä (1878–1939)	13 December 1926	17 December 1927	1 year, 4 days	SDP	Väinö Tanner (SDP)
12	Juho Niukkanen	Juho Niukkanen (1888–1954)	17 December 1927	22 December 1928	1 year, 5 days	Agrarian	Juho Sunila (Agrarian)
(8)	Hugo Relander	Hugo Relander (1865–1947)	22 December 1928	16 August 1929	237 days	Independent	Oskari Mantere (National Progressive)
13	Tyko Reinikka	Tyko Reinikka (1887–1964)	16 August 1929	4 July 1930	322 days	Agrarian	Kyösti Kallio (Agrarian)
14	Juho Vennola	Juho Vennola (1872–1938)	4 July 1930	21 March 1931	260 days	National Progressive	Pehr Evind Svinhufvud (NCP)
(10)	Kyösti Järvinen	Kyösti Järvinen (1869–1957)	21 March 1931	14 December 1932	1 year, 268 days	Agrarian	Juho Sunila (Agrarian)
(8)	Hugo Relander	Hugo Relander (1865–1947)	14 December 1932	7 October 1936	3 years, 298 days	Independent	Toivo Mikael Kivimäki (National Progressive)
(12)	Juho Niukkanen	Juho Niukkanen (1888–1954)	7 October 1936	12 March 1937	156 days	Agrarian	Kyösti Kallio (Agrarian)
15	Väinö Tanner	Väinö Tanner (1881–1966)	12 March 1937	1 December 1939	2 years, 264 days	SDP	Aimo Cajander (National Progressive)
16	Mauno Pekkala	Mauno Pekkala (1890–1952)	1 December 1939	22 May 1942	2 years, 172 days	SDP	Risto Ryti (National Progressive) (1 December 1939 – 19 December 1940); Johan Wilhelm Rangell (National Progressive) (3 January 1941 – 22 May 1942)
(15)	Väinö Tanner	Väinö Tanner (1881–1966)	22 May 1942	8 August 1944	2 years, 78 days	SDP	Johan Wilhelm Rangell (National Progressive) (22 May 1942 – 5 March 1943); Edwin Linkomies (NCP) (5 March 1943 – 8 August 1944)
17	Onni Hiltunen	Onni Hiltunen (1895–1971)	8 August 1944	17 November 1944	101 days	SDP	Antti Hackzell (NCP) (8 August 1944 – 21 September 1944); Urho Castrén (NCP) (21 September 1944 – 17 November 1944)
18	Johan Helo	Johan Helo (1889–1966)	17 November 1944	17 April 1945	151 days	SKDL	Juho Kusti Paasikivi (NCP)
19	Sakari Tuomioja	Sakari Tuomioja (1911–1964)	17 April 1945	17 July 1945	91 days	National Progressive	Juho Kusti Paasikivi (NCP)
20	Ralf Törngren	Ralf Törngren (1899–1961)	17 July 1945	29 July 1948	3 years, 12 days	RKP	Juho Kusti Paasikivi (NCP) (17 July 1945 – 9 March 1946); Mauno Pekkala (SKDL) (9 March 1946 – 29 July 1948)
(17)	Onni Hiltunen	Onni Hiltunen (1895–1971)	29 July 1948	17 March 1950	1 year, 231 days	SDP	Karl-August Fagerholm (SDP)
21	V. J. Sukselainen	V. J. Sukselainen (1906–1995)	17 March 1950	17 January 1951	306 days	Agrarian	Urho Kekkonen (Agrarian)
(17)	Onni Hiltunen	Onni Hiltunen (1895–1971)	17 January 1951	20 September 1951	246 days	SDP	Urho Kekkonen (Agrarian)
22	Viljo Rantala	Viljo Rantala (1892–1980)	20 September 1951	9 July 1953	1 year, 292 days	SDP	Urho Kekkonen (Agrarian)
(12)	Juho Niukkanen	Juho Niukkanen (1888–1954)	9 July 1953	17 November 1953	131 days	Agrarian	Urho Kekkonen (Agrarian)
23	Tuure Junnila	Tuure Junnila (1910–1999)	17 November 1953	5 May 1954	169 days	National Coalition	Sakari Tuomioja (Ind)
(21)	V. J. Sukselainen	V. J. Sukselainen (1906–1995)	5 May 1954	20 October 1954	168 days	Agrarian	Ralf Törngren (RKP)
24	Penna Tervo	Penna Tervo (1901–1956)	20 October 1954	26 February 1956	1 year, 129 days	SDP	Urho Kekkonen (Agrarian)
25	Aarre Simonen	Aarre Simonen (1913–1977)	3 March 1956	27 May 1957	1 year, 85 days	SDP	Karl-August Fagerholm (SDP)
26	Nils Meinander	Nils Meinander (1910–1985)	27 May 1957	2 July 1957	36 days	RKP	V. J. Sukselainen (Agrarian)
27	Martti Miettunen	Martti Miettunen (1907–2002)	2 July 1957	29 November 1957	150 days	Agrarian	V. J. Sukselainen (Agrarian)
28	Lauri Hietanen	Lauri Hietanen (1902–1971)	29 November 1957	26 April 1958	148 days	Independent	Rainer von Fieandt (Ind)
29	Ilmo Nurmela	Ilmo Nurmela (1903–1974)	26 April 1958	29 August 1958	125 days	Independent	Reino Kuuskoski (Ind)
30	Päiviö Hetemäki	Päiviö Hetemäki (1913–1980)	29 August 1958	13 January 1959	137 days	National Coalition	Karl-August Fagerholm (SDP)
31	Wiljam Sarjala	Wiljam Sarjala (1901–1977)	13 January 1959	13 April 1962	3 years, 90 days	Agrarian	V. J. Sukselainen (Agrarian) (13 January 1959 – 14 July 1961); Martti Miettunen (Agrarian) (14 July 1961 – 13 April 1962)
32	Osmo P. Karttunen	Osmo P. Karttunen (1922–1985)	13 April 1962	13 December 1963	1 year, 244 days	National Coalition	Ahti Karjalainen (Agrarian)
33	Mauno Jussila	Mauno Jussila (1908–1988)	13 December 1963	18 December 1963	5 days	Agrarian	Ahti Karjalainen (Agrarian)
34	Esko Rekola	Esko Rekola (1919–2014)	18 December 1963	12 September 1964	269 days	Independent	Reino Ragnar Lehto (Ind)
35	Esa Kaitila	Esa Kaitila (1909–1975)	12 September 1964	27 May 1966	1 year, 257 days	Liberals (1951 – 1965); Liberals (1965 – 1966)	Johannes Virolainen (Kesk.)
36	Mauno Koivisto	Mauno Koivisto (1923–2017)	27 May 1966	31 December 1967	1 year, 218 days	SDP	Rafael Paasio (SDP)
37	Eino Raunio	Eino Raunio (1909–1979)	1 January 1968	14 May 1970	2 years, 133 days	SDP	Rafael Paasio (SDP) (1 January 1968 – 22 March 1968); Mauno Koivisto (SDP) (22 March 1968 – 14 May 1970)
(30)	Päiviö Hetemäki	Päiviö Hetemäki (1913–1980)	14 May 1970	15 July 1970	62 days	Independent	Teuvo Aura (Ind)
38	Carl Olof Tallgren	Carl Olof Tallgren (1927–2024)	15 July 1970	29 October 1971	1 year, 106 days	RKP	Ahti Karjalainen (Kesk.)
(30)	Päiviö Hetemäki	Päiviö Hetemäki (1913–1980)	29 October 1971	23 February 1972	117 days	Independent	Teuvo Aura (Ind)
(36)	Mauno Koivisto	Mauno Koivisto (1923–2017)	23 February 1972	4 September 1972	194 days	SDP	Rafael Paasio (SDP)
39	Johannes Virolainen	Johannes Virolainen (1914–2000)	4 September 1972	13 June 1975	2 years, 282 days	Centre	Kalevi Sorsa (SDP)
40	Heikki Tuominen	Heikki Tuominen (1920–2010)	13 June 1975	30 November 1975	170 days	Independent	Keijo Liinamaa (Ind)
41	Paul Paavela	Paul Paavela (1931–1980)	30 November 1975	29 September 1976	304 days	SDP	Martti Miettunen (Kesk.)
(34)	Esko Rekola	Esko Rekola (1919–2014)	29 September 1976	15 May 1977	228 days	Independent	Martti Miettunen (Kesk.)
(41)	Paul Paavela	Paul Paavela (1931–1980)	15 May 1977	26 May 1979	2 years, 11 days	SDP	Kalevi Sorsa (SDP)
42	Ahti Pekkala	Ahti Pekkala (1924–2014)	26 May 1979	31 January 1986	6 years, 250 days	Centre	Mauno Koivisto (SDP) (26 May 1979 – 26 January 1982); Kalevi Sorsa (SDP) (26 January 1982 – 31 January 1986)
43	Esko Ollila	Esko Ollila (1940–2018)	1 February 1986	30 April 1987	1 year, 88 days	Centre	Kalevi Sorsa (SDP)
44	Erkki Liikanen	Erkki Liikanen (born 1950)	30 April 1987	28 February 1990	2 years, 304 days	SDP	Harri Holkeri (NCP)
45	Matti Louekoski	Matti Louekoski (born 1941)	1 March 1990	26 April 1991	1 year, 56 days	SDP	Harri Holkeri (NCP)
46	Iiro Viinanen	Iiro Viinanen (born 1944)	26 April 1991	2 February 1996	4 years, 282 days	National Coalition	Esko Aho (Kesk.) (26 April 1991 – 13 April 1995); Paavo Lipponen (SDP) (13 April 1995 – 2 February 1996)
47	Sauli Niinistö	Sauli Niinistö (born 1948)	2 February 1996	17 April 2003	7 years, 74 days	National Coalition	Paavo Lipponen (SDP)
48	Antti Kalliomäki	Antti Kalliomäki (born 1947)	17 April 2003	22 September 2005	2 years, 159 days	SDP	Anneli Jäätteenmäki (Kesk.) (17 April 2003 – 24 June 2003); Matti Vanhanen (Kesk.) (24 June 2003 – 22 September 2005)
49	Eero Heinäluoma	Eero Heinäluoma (born 1955)	23 September 2005	19 April 2007	1 year, 208 days	SDP	Matti Vanhanen (Kesk.)
50	Jyrki Katainen	Jyrki Katainen (born 1971)	19 April 2007	22 June 2011	4 years, 64 days	National Coalition	Matti Vanhanen (Kesk.) (19 April 2007 – 22 June 2010); Mari Kiviniemi (22 June 2010 – 22 June 2011)
51	Jutta Urpilainen	Jutta Urpilainen (born 1975)	22 June 2011	6 June 2014	2 years, 349 days	SDP	Jyrki Katainen (NCP)
52	Antti Rinne	Antti Rinne (born 1962)	6 June 2014	29 May 2015	357 days	SDP	Jyrki Katainen (NCP) (6 June 2014 – 24 June 2014); Alexander Stubb (NCP) (24 June 2014 – 29 May 2015)
53	Alexander Stubb	Alexander Stubb (born 1968)	29 May 2015	22 June 2016	1 year, 24 days	National Coalition	Juha Sipilä (Kesk.)
54	Petteri Orpo	Petteri Orpo (born 1969)	22 June 2016	6 June 2019	2 years, 349 days	National Coalition	Juha Sipilä (Kesk.)
55	Mika Lintilä	Mika Lintilä (born 1966)	6 June 2019	10 December 2019	187 days	Centre	Antti Rinne (SDP)
56	Katri Kulmuni	Katri Kulmuni (born 1987)	10 December 2019	9 June 2020	182 days	Centre	Sanna Marin (SDP)
57	Matti Vanhanen	Matti Vanhanen (born 1955)	9 June 2020	27 May 2021	352 days	Centre	Sanna Marin (SDP)
58	Annika Saarikko	Annika Saarikko (born 1983)	27 May 2021	20 June 2023	2 years, 24 days	Centre	Sanna Marin (SDP)
59	Riikka Purra	Riikka Purra (born 1977)	20 June 2023	Incumbent	3 years, 49 days	Finns	Petteri Orpo (NCP)
