= Iiro Viinanen =

Finnish politician (born 1944)

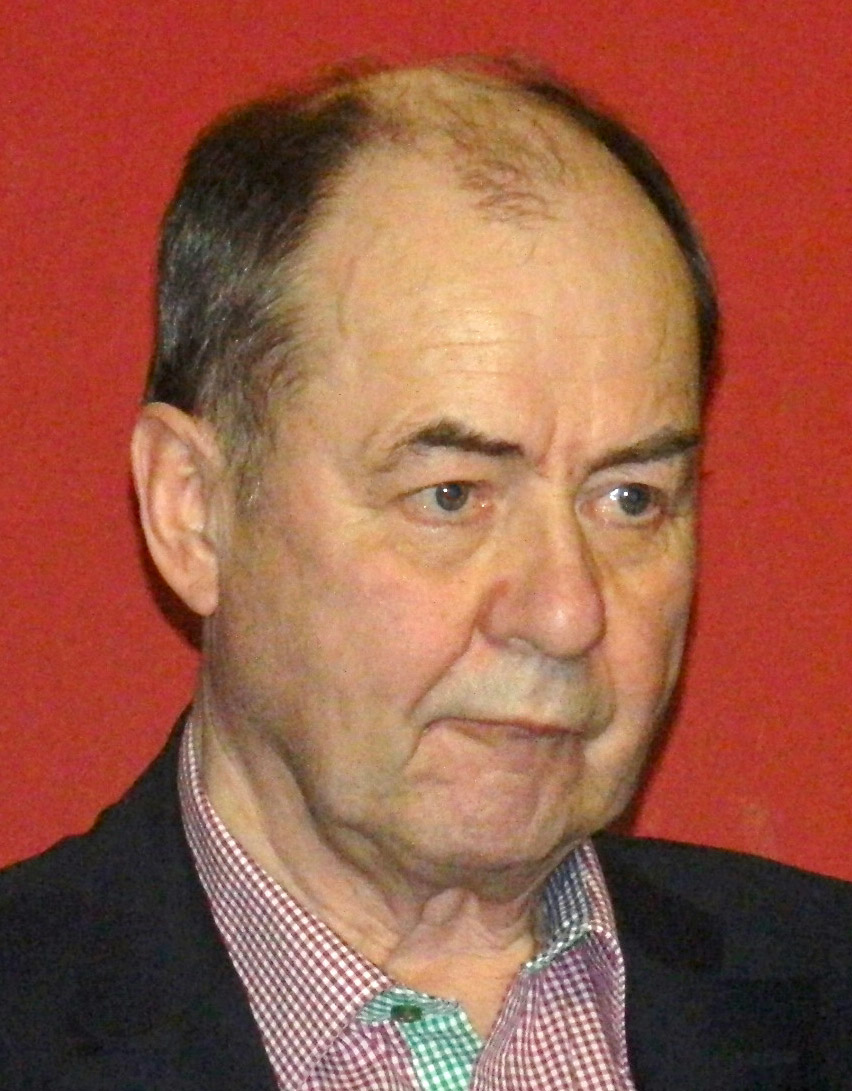
- Viinanen in 2015

Minister of Finance
- In office 26 April 1991 – 2 February 1996
- Prime Minister: Esko Aho; Paavo Lipponen
- Preceded by: Matti Louekoski
- Succeeded by: Sauli Niinistö

Member of the Finnish Parliament
- In office 26 March 1983 – 29 February 1996
- Constituency: Häme

Personal details
- Born: 27 September 1944 (age 81) Kuopio, Finland
- Party: National Coalition Party

Iiro Viinanen (born 27 September 1944) is a Finnish politician.

== Biography ==
Viinanen graduated as an engineer from a Tampere Institute in 1967 and as a Master of Science from the Helsinki University of Technology in 1974. He was a Member of the Parliament of Finland from 1983 to 1996. He was a member of the National Coalition Party. He served as the Finland's Minister of Finance from 1991 to 1996.

During his term as minister, Finland went through its worst recession in history. As Finland's Minister of Finance in the Aho Cabinet, he led a strict budget discipline and austerity measures. He stated that if government spending wasn't cut, Finland would no longer be able to borrow money in foreign exchange reserves. Reactions towards his political actions caused either strong approval or strong disapproval. Some felt that he had saved the Finnish treasury and some felt that he had ruined the Finnish welfare state.

In 1996, he was appointed CEO of the then called Pohjola Insurance. At the end of the 1990s, he became a board member of Nokia, Kone, UPM, YIT, Finnair, and Orion. He served as a vice-chairperson of Nokia from 1996 to 2000.

He was diagnosed with Parkinson's disease in 2000, forcing him to retire from politics.

Preceded by Matti Louekoski	Minister of Finance (Finland); 1991–1996	Succeeded by Sauli Niinistö
