= Paavo Hynninen =

Finnish minister and ambassador

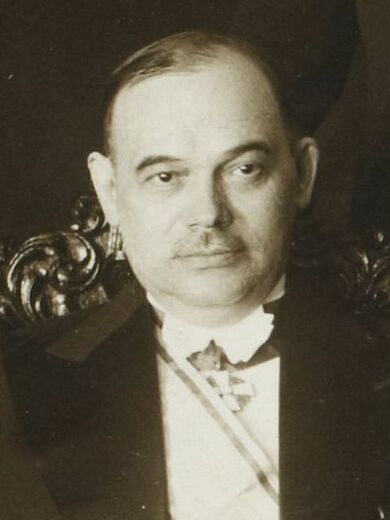

Minister of Foreign Affairs
- In office 29 November 1957 – 29 August 1958
- Prime Minister: Rainer von Fieandt; Reino Kuuskoski
- Preceded by: Johannes Virolainen
- Succeeded by: Johannes Virolainen

Personal details
- Born: Paavo Johannes Hynninen; 31 May 1883 Joroinen, Grand Duchy of Finland
- Died: 18 May 1960 (aged 76) Helsinki, Finland
- Party: Independent
- Occupation: Diplomat

Paavo Johannes (Juho) Hynninen (31 May 1883 Joroinen – 18 May 1960 Helsinki ) was a Finnish Minister and Ambassador. He was a Master of Philosophy.

Hynninen was born into a farmer family. He graduated from Kuopio, but left, and remained after university studies in Helsinki. He was initially a professor of economics and commerce at the School of Commerce at the Helsinki School of Commerce in 1909–1915, and at the same time as a professor of agricultural sciences in Helsinki from 1910 to 1911.

He was the chairman of the Student Union in 1913 and Curator of the Savoy Society 1913–1916. Teacher's career remained when Hynninen became Editor-in-Chief of Uusi Suometar newspaper for the years 1915–1917.

During the World War I, Hynninen also acted in an Independence Movement when he was a member of the Active Committee to represent the Old Finns. Eino Suolahti later replaced him from Active Committee's membership. He was then appointed Managing Director of Luotto-Pankki for the years 1917–1922. In addition, he was President of the Finnish Literary Society Kirjapaino Oy in 1916–1918.

In 1922, Hynninen moved to the Foreign Service established after the independence of Finland and initially served for four years as Head of the Consulate General of St Petersburg. Thereafter, he served as Consul General in The Hague for two years and after 1928 as Envoy to Riga. After that, he served as Envoy in Tallinn between 1933 and 1940. In October 1942, Hynninen became Consul General in Gothenburg, and from then on he was appointed Permanent Secretary (1943–1946), when Aaro Pakaslahti became an Envoy to Vichy France. After the war, Hynninen's career continued under new political conditions. He served as Ambassador to Denmark in Copenhagen since 1946 until his retirement, until 1953.

Even at his retirement days, Hynninen served as Minister of Foreign Affairs at the Von Fieandt and Kuuskoski governments in 1957–1958.

Political offices
Preceded by Johannes Virolainen	Foreign Minister of Finland; 1957-1958	Succeeded by Johannes Virolainen
