= Carl Olof Tallgren =

Finnish politician (1927–2024)

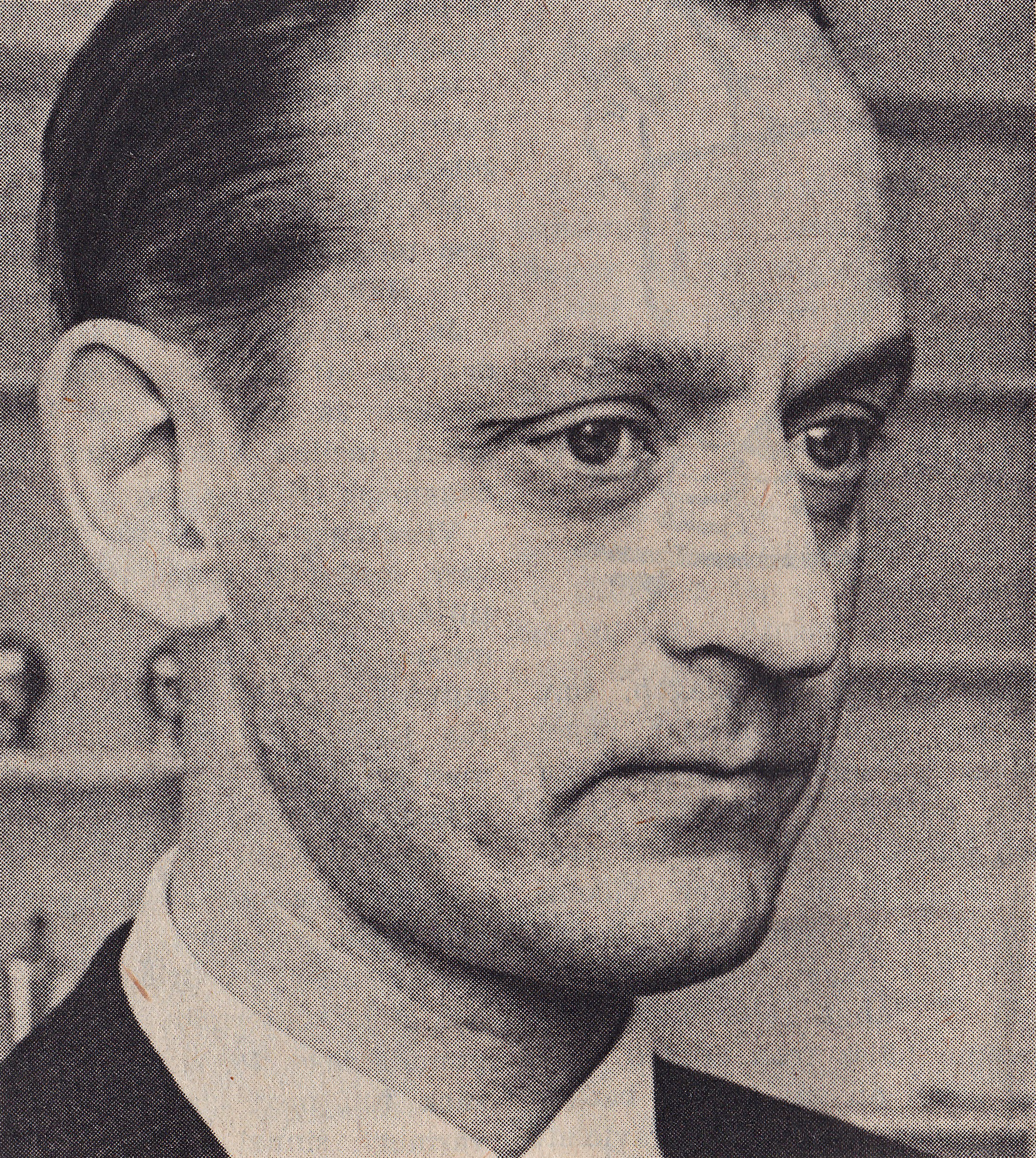
- Tallgren in 1968

Minister of Finance
- In office 15 July 1970 – 29 October 1971
- Prime Minister: Ahti Karjalainen
- Preceded by: Päiviö Hetemäki
- Succeeded by: Päiviö Hetemäki

Chairman of Swedish People's Party of Finland
- In office 1974–1977
- Preceded by: Kristian Gestrin
- Succeeded by: Pär Stenbäck

Personal details
- Born: 28 January 1927 Turku, Finland
- Died: 16 June 2024 (aged 97)
- Party: Swedish People's Party of Finland
- Spouse: Gurli Vivica Öhman
- Education: Turku Academy

Carl Olof Tallgren (28 January 1927 – 16 June 2024) was a Finnish politician who served as the minister of finance between 1970 and 1971. He was one of the heads of the Swedish People's Party of Finland.

== Early life and education ==
Tallgren was born in Turku on 28 January 1927, and his parents were office manager and deputy consul Karl Nikolai Tallgren and Ella Alica Lindh. He graduated from the Swedish Classical High School in 1945. Then he attended the Turku Academy and in 1951 graduated with a bachelor's degree in politics. He also received a PhD.

== Career ==
Following graduation Tallgren was employed as an ombudsman at the Åboland Municipal Association in 1952 and worked there for ten years until 1962. In 1957 he also became an operations manager in the Åboland district for the Finnish Red Cross. Next year he was appointed deputy to the Foreign Affairs Minister Ralf Törngren. In 1961 Tallgren was elected to the Finnish Parliament for the Swedish People's Party of Finland representing Åboland when Törngren died and served at the Parliament until 1975.

Tallgren was appointed the minister of finance in Ahti Karjalainen's second cabinet on 15 July 1970, and his term lasted until 29 October 1971. He succeeded Kristian Gestrin in 1974 as chairman of the Swedish People's Party of Finland which he held until 1977 when Pär Stenbäck took over the post.

Tallgren was also employed as a treasurer at the Turku Academy Foundation between 1964 and 1973. Following his retirement from politics he was named as managing director of the Art Society Association, and his term lasted until 1991. He served on the boards of different companies and foundations, including the Foundation for Åbo Akademi University (1982–1997), Oy Partek Ab, Konstsamfundet, Oy Stockmann Ab, Oy City Forum Ab, and Hufvudstadsbladet Ab m.fl.

== Personal life and death ==
Tallgren married the economist Gurli Vivica Öhman in 1950. He died on 16 June 2024, at the age of 97.
