= Paul Paavela =

Finnish politician and official

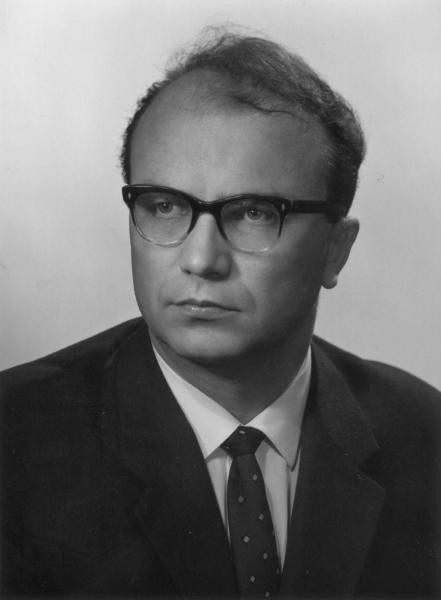
Paul Paavela in 1960.

Paul Paavela (13 April 1931 in Suojärvi - 19 May 1980 in Vihti) was a Finnish official and politician from the Social Democratic Party. Paavela was Minister of Finance from 1975–1976 and 1977–1979.

Political offices
Preceded by Heikki Tuominen	Minister of Finance; 1975–1976	Succeeded by Esko Rekola
Preceded by Esko Rekola	Minister of Finance; 1977–1979	Succeeded by Ahti Pekkala
