= Jonathan Wartiovaara =

Finnish civil servant & politician (1875-1937)

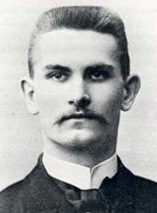
Jonathan Wartiovaara

Jonathan Vindician Wartiovaara (23 August 1875, Antrea – 9 December 1937; surname until 1906 Weckman) was a Finnish civil servant and politician. He served as Minister of Finance from 15 March 1920 to 9 April 1921. Wartiovaara was a member of the National Coalition Party.
