= Veikko Helle =

Finnish politician (1911–2005)

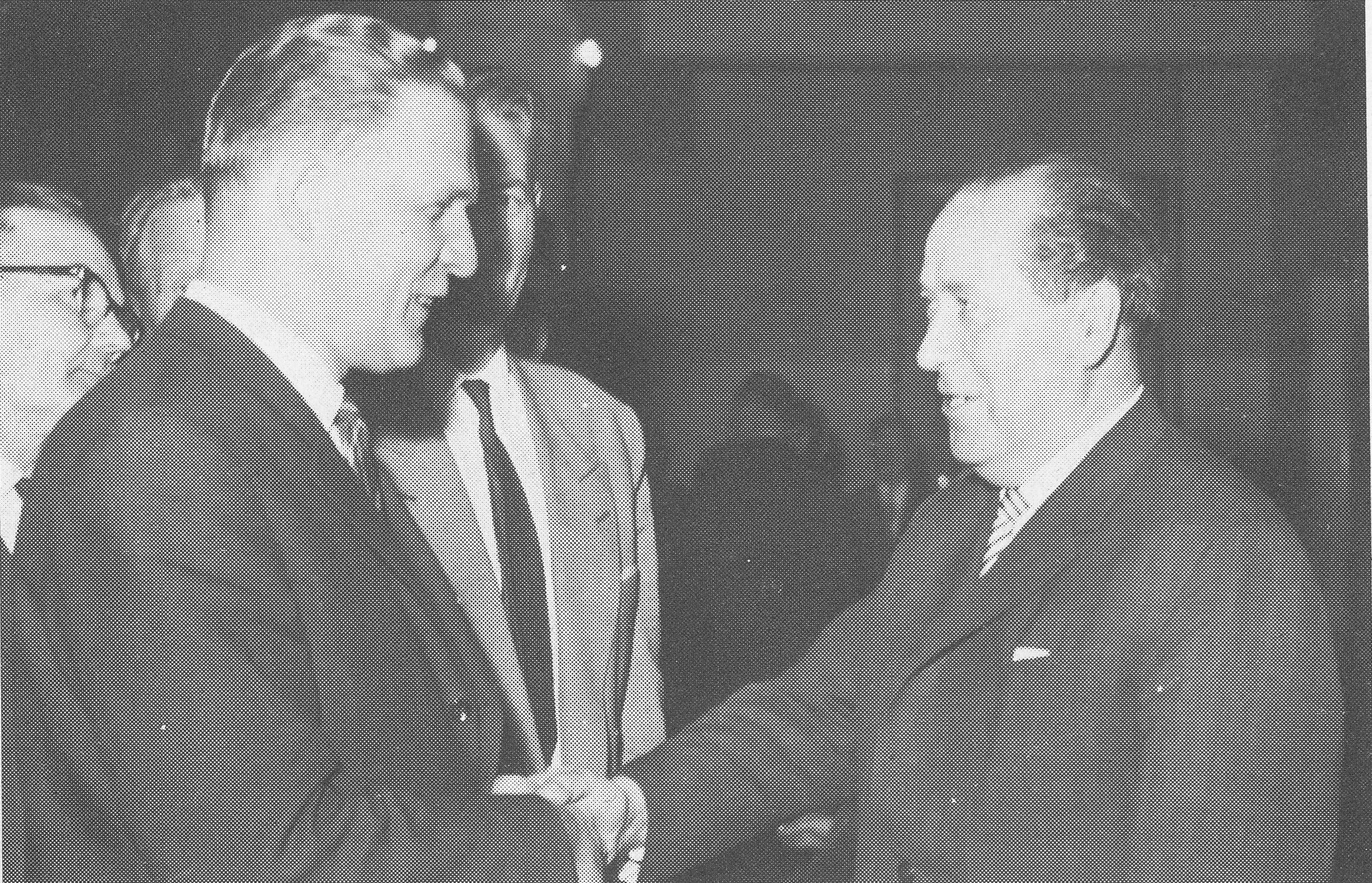
- Helle to the left.

Speaker of the Parliament of Finland
- In office 5 February 1976 – 31 January 1978
- Preceded by: V. J. Sukselainen
- Succeeded by: Ahti Pekkala

Deputy Prime Minister of Finland
- In office 15 July 1970 – 29 October 1971
- Prime Minister: Ahti Karjalainen
- Preceded by: Päiviö Hetemäki
- Succeeded by: Päiviö Hetemäki

Minister of Labour
- In office 31 December 1982 – 6 May 1983
- Prime Minister: Kalevi Sorsa
- Preceded by: Jouko Kajanoja
- Succeeded by: Urpo Leppänen
- In office 23 February 1972 – 4 September 1972
- Prime Minister: Rafael Paasio
- Preceded by: Keijo Liinamaa
- Succeeded by: Valde Nevalainen
- In office 15 July 1970 – 29 October 1971
- Prime Minister: Ahti Karjalainen
- Preceded by: Esa Timonen
- Succeeded by: Keijo Liinamaa
- In office 1 March 1970 – 14 May 1970
- Prime Minister: Mauno Koivisto
- Preceded by: Position established
- Succeeded by: Esa Timonen

Personal details
- Born: Veikko Kullervo Helle; 11 December 1911 Vihti, Grand Duchy of Finland
- Died: 5 February 2005 (aged 93) Lohja, Finland
- Party: Social Democratic

Veikko Kullervo Helle (11 December 1911 in Vihti – 5 February 2005 in Lohja) was a Finnish politician representing the Social Democrats.

Helle was originally a carpenter by trade and followed his father into municipal politics and later into the parliament. He was elected in the 1936 municipal elections and he served as a member of parliament from 1951 to 1983. He was four times a minister between 1970 and 1983 and the speaker of the parliament from 1976 to 1978. Helle ran in the elections for SDP chairman in 1963, losing the post to Rafael Paasio. In the inner party politics, he represented the right wing of the SDP.

He served as the minister of labor on four occasions between 1970 and 1983.

Helle was a member of the Vihti municipal council for 51 years from 1936 to 1987, and was the chairman of the council 1958–1976.

Political offices
Preceded by V. J. Sukselainen	Speaker of the Parliament of Finland; 1976–1978	Succeeded by Ahti Pekkala
