= Hugo Relander =

Finnish mathematician and politician (1865–1947)

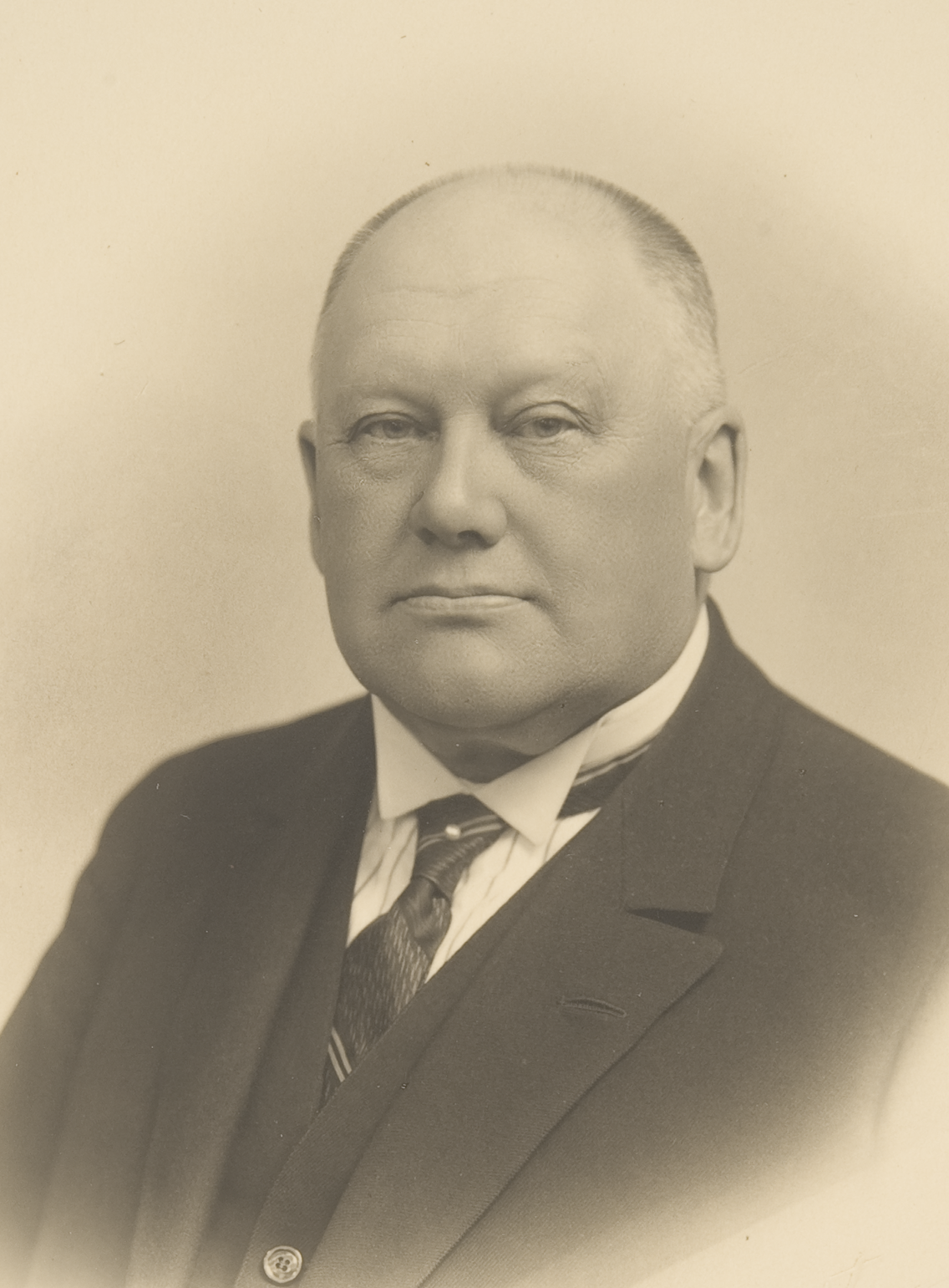

Minister of Finance
- In office 18 January 1924 – 31 May 1924
- Prime Minister: Aimo Cajander
- In office 31 March 1925 – 31 December 1925
- Prime Minister: Antti Tulenheimo
- In office 22 December 1928 – 16 August 1929
- Prime Minister: Oskari Mantere
- In office 14 December 1932 – 7 October 1936
- Prime Minister: Toivo Mikael Kivimäki

Personal details
- Born: Hugo Magnus Johannes Relander; 8 April 1865 Viipuri, Grand Duchy of Finland
- Died: 27 March 1947 (aged 81) Helsinki, Finland
- Occupation: Mathematician

Hugo Relander (8 April 1865 – 27 March 1947) was a Finnish mathematician who served as the Minister of Finance for four terms from 1924 to 1936 with brief interruptions.

== Biography ==
Relander was born in Viipuri on 8 April 1865. His parents were school principal Johan Richard Relander and Johanna Katarina Alopaeus. He obtained his doctorate degree in 1890.

Relander worked at Tampere Reaalilyseo, a Swedish-speaking boys school, between 1889 and 1907. He first taught Mathematics, Chemistry and Physics at the school and then served as its principal.

Relander was the chief mathematician at a life insurance company from 1908 to 1913. Then he served as the chairman of its supervisory board from 1921 to 1940. In addition, he was the head of the Industrial Workers in Finland Mutual Fire Protection Association in the period between 1913 and 1936 and headed Industrial Mortgage Bank of Finland between 1924 and 1926.

Relander was first named as the Minister of Finance on 18 January 1924 to the second cabinet of Aimo Cajander and held the post until 31 May 1924. Between 31 March 1925 and 31 December 1925 he also served as the Minister of Finance in the cabinet led by Antti Tulenheimo. He was appointed Minister of Finance for a third time on 22 December 1928 to the cabinet headed by Oskari Mantere and remained in office until 16 August 1929. Relander's last tenure as Minister of Finance was from 14 December 1932 to 7 October 1936 in the cabinet of Toivo Mikael Kivimäki.

Relander died in Helsinki on 27 March 1947.
