= Eemil Luukka =

Finnish politician

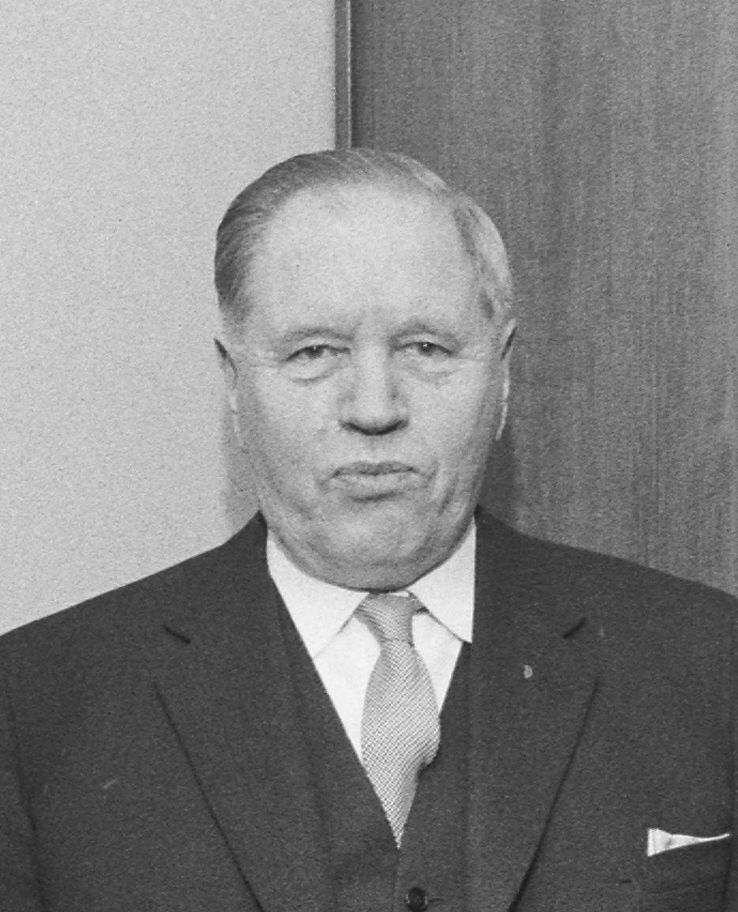
Eemil Luukka in 1961.

Eemil Vihtori Luukka (1 December 1892, Muolaa – 1 June 1970, Valkeakoski) was a Finnish politician from the Agrarian League and most remembered as an advocate of Karjalan Liitto.

Luukka was a member of the parliament from 1936 to 1966 and held ministerial post in eight cabinets between 1942 and 1962. He served as a deputy of Prime Minister V. J. Sukselainen from 3 July to 14 July 1961 and a deputy of Martti Miettunen from 14 July 1961 to 12 April 1962.

Luukka was an advocate of the peaceful return of Karelia and was the chairman of Karjalan Liitto 1946–1967.
