= Matti Louekoski =

Finnish politician (born 1941)

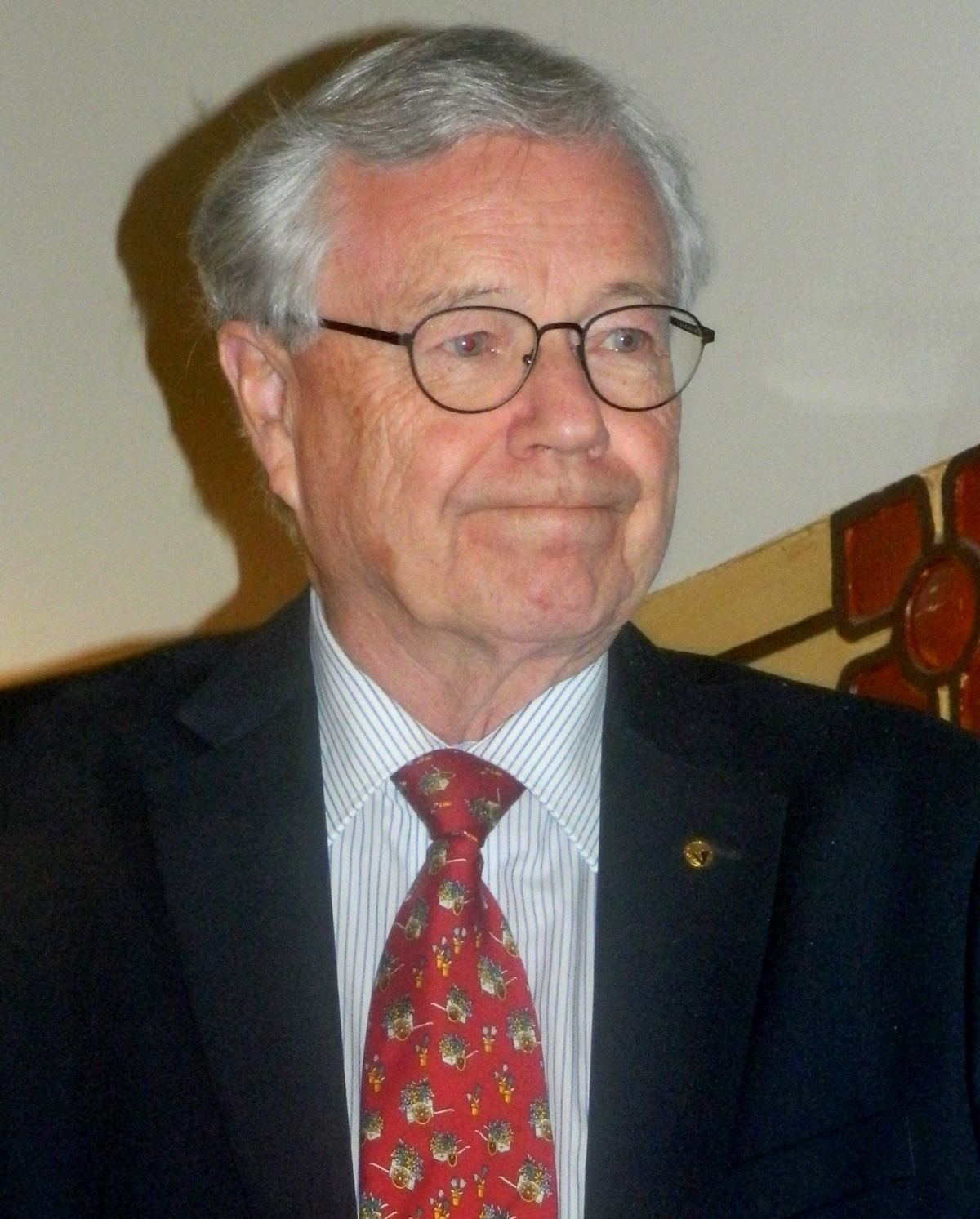
Matti Louekoski in 2015

Matti Kalevi Louekoski (born 14 April 1941) is a Finnish politician and a lawyer by profession. He is a member of the Social Democratic Party of Finland (SDP) and a former long-term member of the governing board of the Bank of Finland.

Louekoski was born in Oulu, and was elected to the Parliament for the periods of 1976-1979 and 1983–1996. He was a member of several cabinets, including Minister of Education in Aura cabinet of 1971, Minister of Justice in Sorsa cabinet 1972–1975, Minister of Justice in Holkeri cabinet 1987–1990. In 1990 Louekoski became the Minister of Finance in Holkeri cabinet when Erkki Liikanen became the ambassador to European Union. Louekoski's term as the Minister of Finance ended in the 1991 elections. Louekoski held the post of a minister for total 2,782 days.

Louekoski served also in the Espoo city council 1977–2002. He was a member of the board of Imatra power 1974-1990 and a member of Finnish Olympic Committee 1988–1993. Louekoski left the Parliament in 1996 to become a member of the board of the Bank of Finland. He acted as the deputy chairman of the board 2000–2008. He retired on 1 January 2008.
