= Hannes Ryömä =

Finnish politician

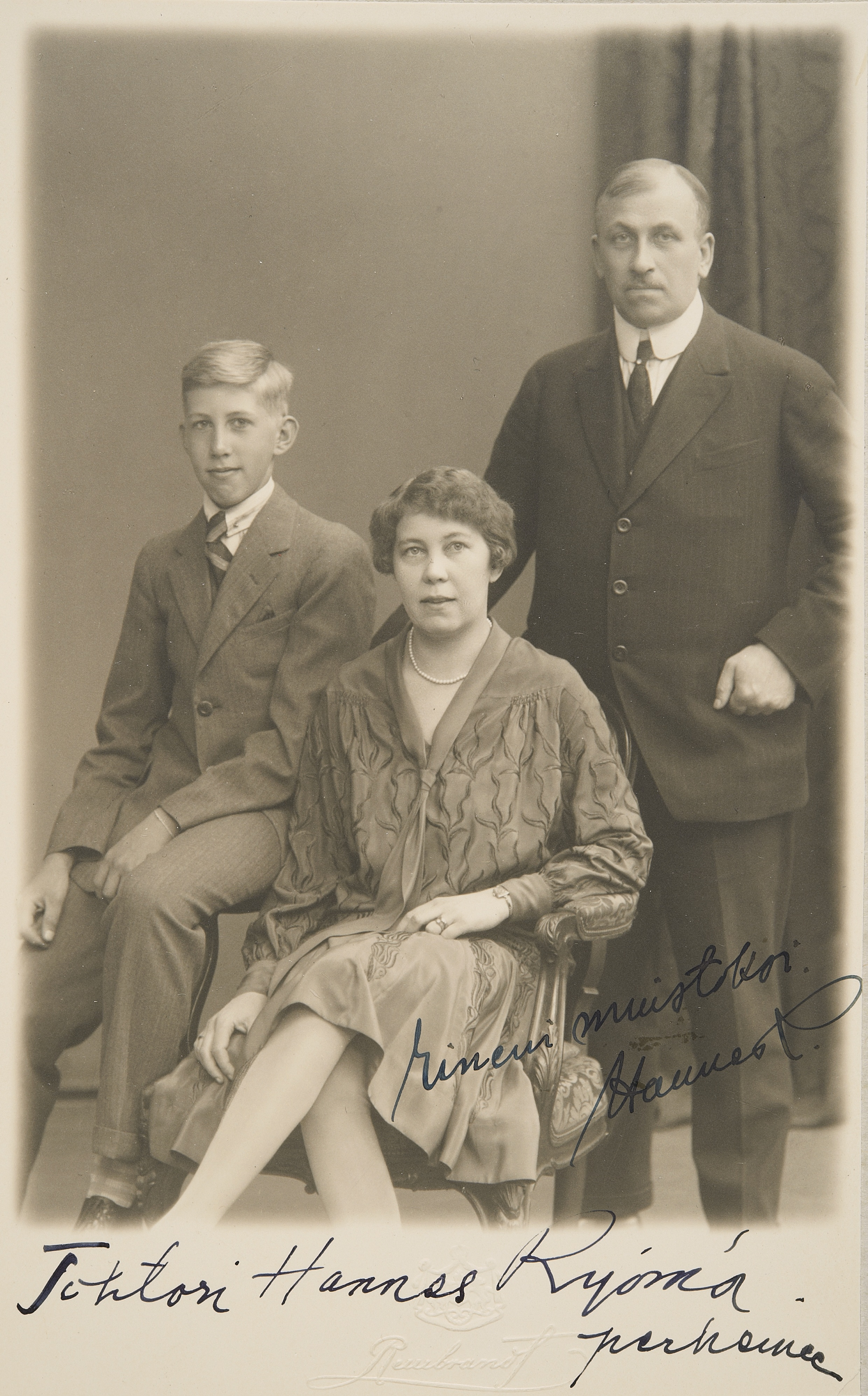
Hannes Ryömä with his wife Eine Magda Sofia née Sundvall and son Mauri in early 1920s.

August Johannes (Hannes) Ryömä (24 April 1878 – 22 May 1939) was a Finnish physician and politician, born in Karkku.

== Biography ==
He was a member of the Parliament of Finland for the Social Democratic Party of Finland from 1919 to 1939. He served as Minister of Finance from December 1926 to December 1927 and Minister of Transport and Public Works from 1937 to 1938. He died in Helsinki, aged 61.
