= Ahti Pekkala =

Finnish politician (1924–2014)

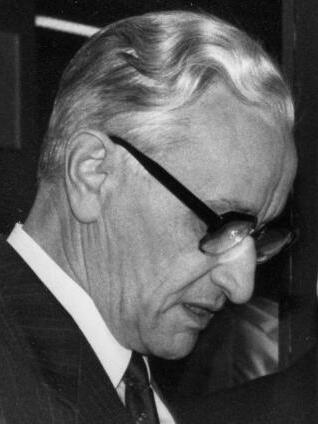
Pekkala in 1987

Ahti Antti Johannes Pekkala (20 December 1924 – 23 August 2014) was a Finnish politician from the Centre Party.

Pekkala worked as a manager in a bank in Haapavesi 1952–1985. He was elected to the parliament in 1970 and was a deputy chairman of Centre Party from 1971 to 1986, when he left the parliament. He served as a deputy speaker of the parliament from 1976 to 1978 and as the speaker 1978–1979. Pekkala was Minister of Finance in three consecutive cabinets 1979–1986. He served as the governor of Oulu Province in 1986–1991.

Political offices
Preceded by Veikko Helle	Speaker of the Parliament of Finland; 1978–1979	Succeeded by Johannes Virolainen
Preceded by Paul Paavela	Minister of Finance; 1979–1986	Succeeded by Esko Ollila
