= Aarre Simonen =

Finnish lawyer and politician

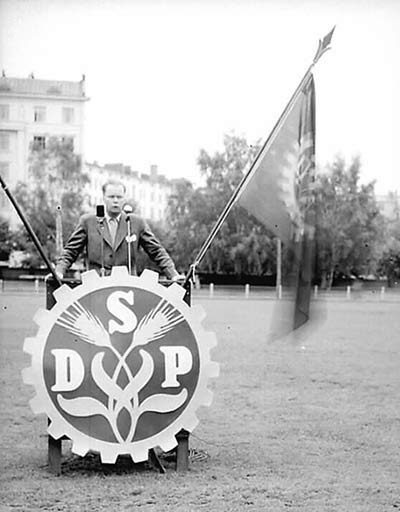
Aarre Simonen addressing a political rally at the Pyynikki field in Tampere, in April 1951.

Aarre Edvard Simonen (18 November 1913, Helsinki – 3 February 1977) was a Finnish lawyer and politician.

He served as Minister of the Interior from 29 July 1948 to 16 March 1950, Deputy Minister of Transport and Communications from 24 March 1949 to 16 March 1950, Minister of Justice from 20 October to 6 November 1954, Minister of Trade and Industry from 20 October 1954 to 3 March 1956, Minister of Finance from 3 March 1956 to 26 May 1957, Deputy Prime Minister from 2 September to 31 October 1957 and again as Minister of Justice from 27 May 1966 to 13 May 1970.

He was a member of the Parliament of Finland from 1951 to 1962. Simonen began his political career in the Social Democratic Party of Finland (SDP). He was later among the founders of the Social Democratic Union of Workers and Smallholders (TPSL) and served as its chairman from 1964 to 1970. When the majority within the TPSL decided in 1973 to rejoin the SDP, Simonen belonged to the minority which opposed the decision and went on to found the Socialist Workers Party (STP).

He was a member in the Board of Bank of Finland until 1976.
