= Tuure Junnila =

Finnish politician (1910–1999)

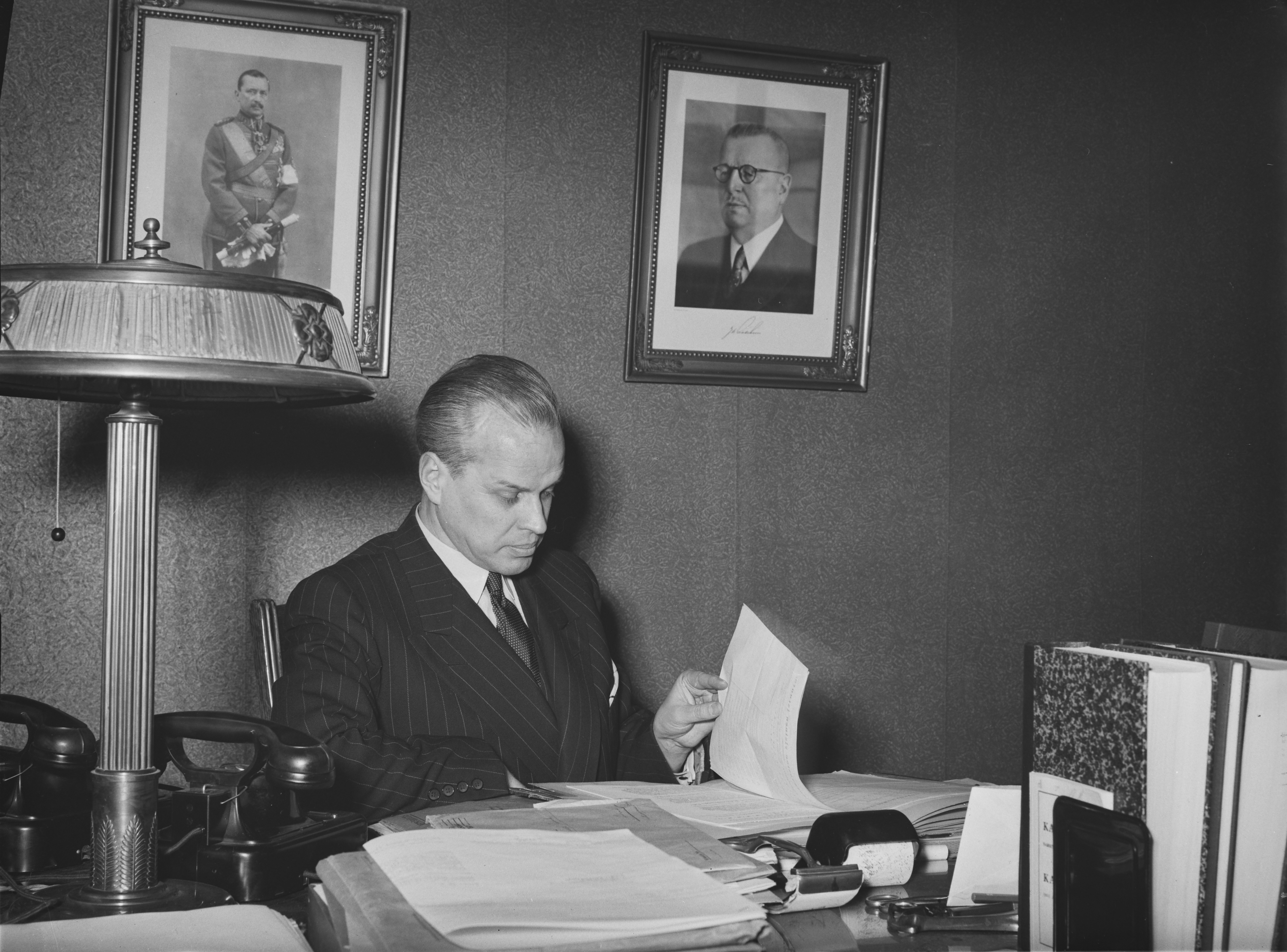
Tuure Junnila

Tuure Jaakko Kalervo Junnila (24 July 1910, in Kiikka – 21 June 1999) was a Finnish economist and politician. He served as Minister of Finance from 17 November 1953 to 4 May 1954. He was a member of the Parliament of Finland from 1951 to 1962, from 1966 to 1979, from 1983 to 1987 and from 1990 to 1991, representing the National Coalition Party.
