= Nils Meinander =

Finnish economist, journalist and politician (1910–1985)

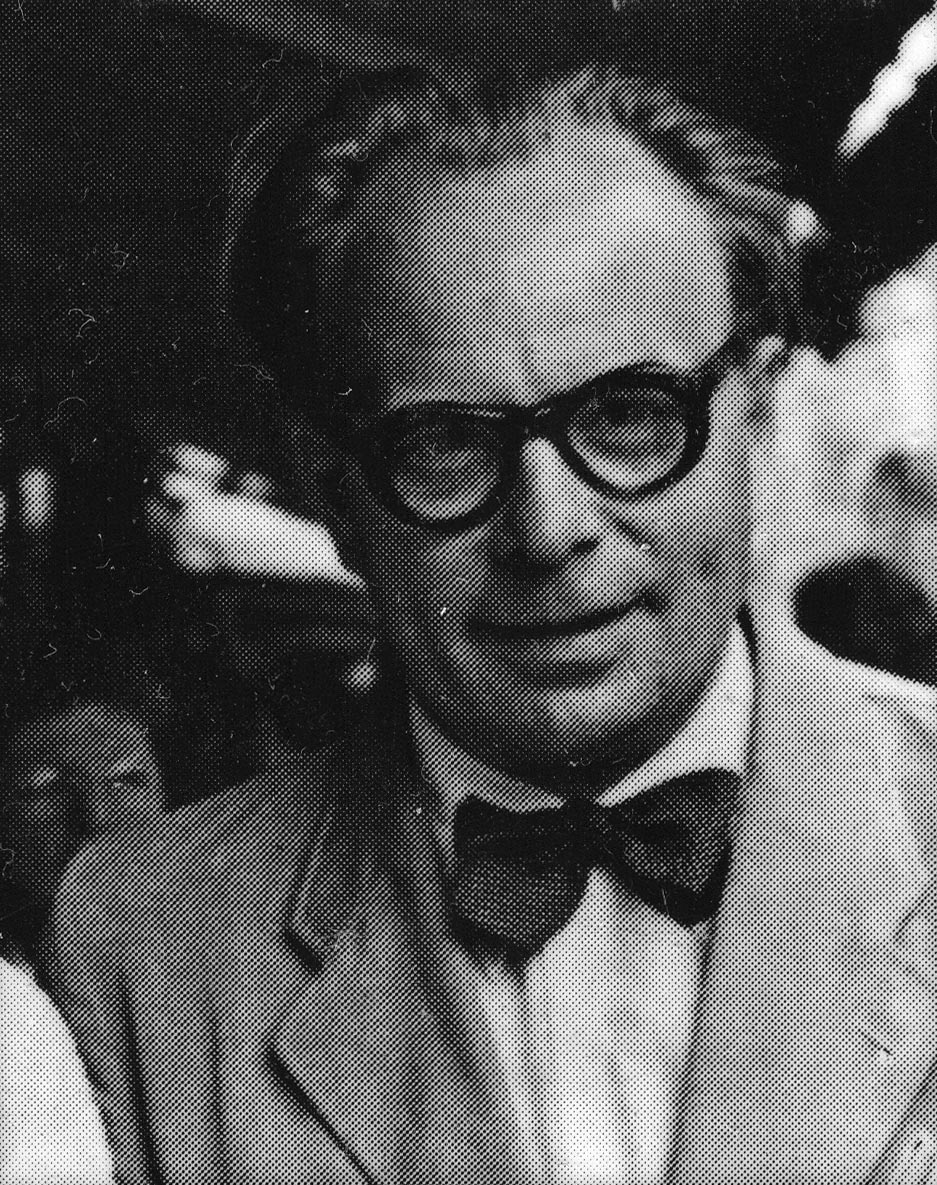

Tor Nils Hilding Meinander (4 August 1910, in Ekenäs – 3 July 1985, in Helsinki) was a Finland-Swedish economist, journalist and politician. Meinander served as a professor of economics at Hanken School of Economics, was a member of the Parliament of Finland from 1945 to 1962, and served as Minister of Finance in 1957.

== Biography ==
Meinander's father was the bank manager and varatuomari Sven Hilding Andreas Meinander and his mother was Valborg Anna Amanda Grotenfelt. Meinander graduated with a Bachelor of Arts in 1933 and defended his thesis in 1950. Meinander's participation in the Nylands Nation and the Nyliberala studentförbundet (New Liberal Student Union) laid the foundation for his political skills.

Before his political career, Meinander worked at the Nordic Union Bank 1929–1934, within the Swedish People's Party 1934–1936, at Hufvudstadsbladet 1937–1942, and at Åbo Akademi University as a teacher 1942–1944. He was one of the leaders of the peace opposition during the final stages of the Continuation War from 1943 to 1944 and at the same time held an important position in the State Information Agency (Valtion tiedoituslaitos). During his time as deputy director at the State Information Agency, Meinander began to publish counter-information activities in the anti-war magazine Selvät sanat.

Meinander was later a professor of economics at Hanken School of Economics in Helsinki from 1953 to 1973.

He was a member of the Parliament of Finland from 1945 to 1962, representing the Swedish People's Party of Finland. He served as Deputy Minister of Finance from 17 March 1950 to 17 January 1951 and 9 July to 17 November 1953 and as Minister of Finance and Deputy Prime Minister from 27 May to 2 July 1957. He was a presidential elector in the 1950 Finnish presidential election.

Meinander was married two times. He married Gunnel Estlander in 1937 and economist Anita Gabriella Cavén in 1947. Meinander had five children, one of whom was the entomologist Martin Meinander.

== Bibliography ==
- En krönika om vattensågen (1945)
- Tungt skadestånd. Vad krigsskadeståndet till Ryssland innebär för Finlands folkhushåll (1946)
- Folkhushållningens grundfrågor (1948)
- Skogshushållning och sågverksrörelse i Torneå, Kemi och Simo älvdalar (1950)
- Ränteeffekten. En studie över räntans roll i moderna samhällen (1955)
- Det tillbakahållna välståndet (1958)
- Penningpolitik under etthundrafemtio år. Finlands Bank 1811–1961 (1963)
- Gränges – en krönika om svensk järnmalm (1968)
- Ekonomerna och verkligheten (1968)
- Pengarna i den ekonomiska politiken (1976)
- Insyn och efterklokhet. Politiska minnen 1940–1962 (1977; 2 uppl. 1978)
- Det fria Finland formas (1978)
- Finland mognar (1983)
