= Kauno Kleemola =

Finnish politician (1906–1965)

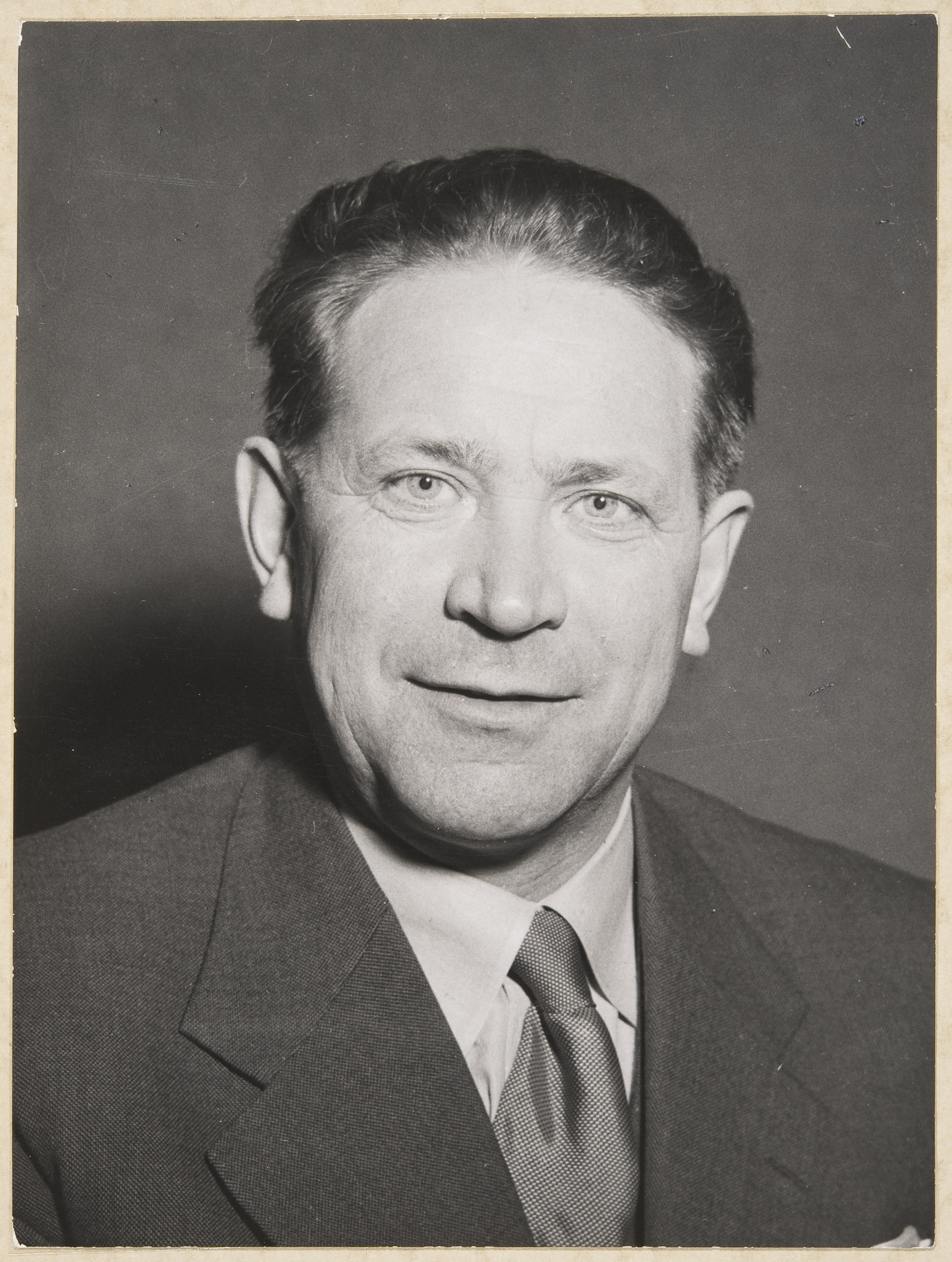
Kauno Kleemola.

Kauno Antero Kleemola (5 July 1906, in Kälviä – 12 March 1965, in Kannus) was a Finnish politician from the Agrarian League.

Kleemola was a farmer from Central Ostrobothnia and as politician an advocate of Central Ostrobothnia in Helsinki. He was speaker of the parliament 1962–1965 and minister in several cabinets of Kekkonen, and hold the title of Deputy Prime Minister in 1961. Kekkonen designated him as the prime minister in December 1958; Kleemola, however, failed to form a cabinet.

Political offices
Preceded by Karl-August Fagerholm	Speaker of the Parliament of Finland; 1962–1965	Succeeded by Karl-August Fagerholm
