= Esa Kaitila =

Finnish politician

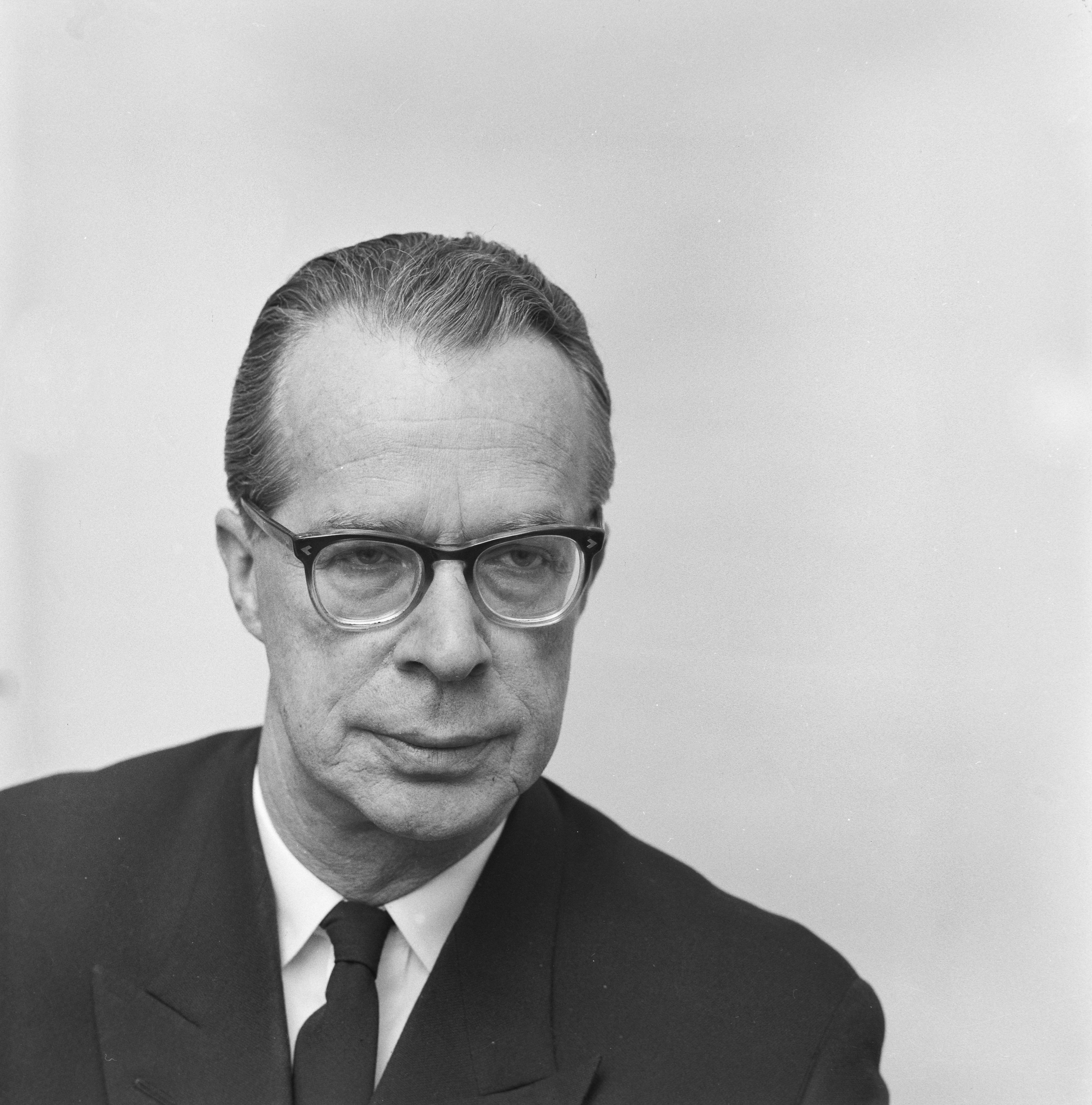
Esa Kaitila in 1962.

Esa Heikki Kaitila (22 April 1909, Viipuri – 18 June 1975, Helsinki) was a Finnish professor and politician. He served as Minister of Social Affairs and Deputy Minister of Finance from 17 November 1953 to 5 May 1954, as Minister of Trade and Industry from 27 May to 29 November 1957 and as Minister of Finance from 12 September 1964 to 27 May 1966. He was a Member of the Parliament of Finland, representing the People's Party of Finland from 1951 to 1965 and the Liberal People's Party from 1965 to 1966.
