= Reino Kuuskoski =

Prime minister of Finland in 1958

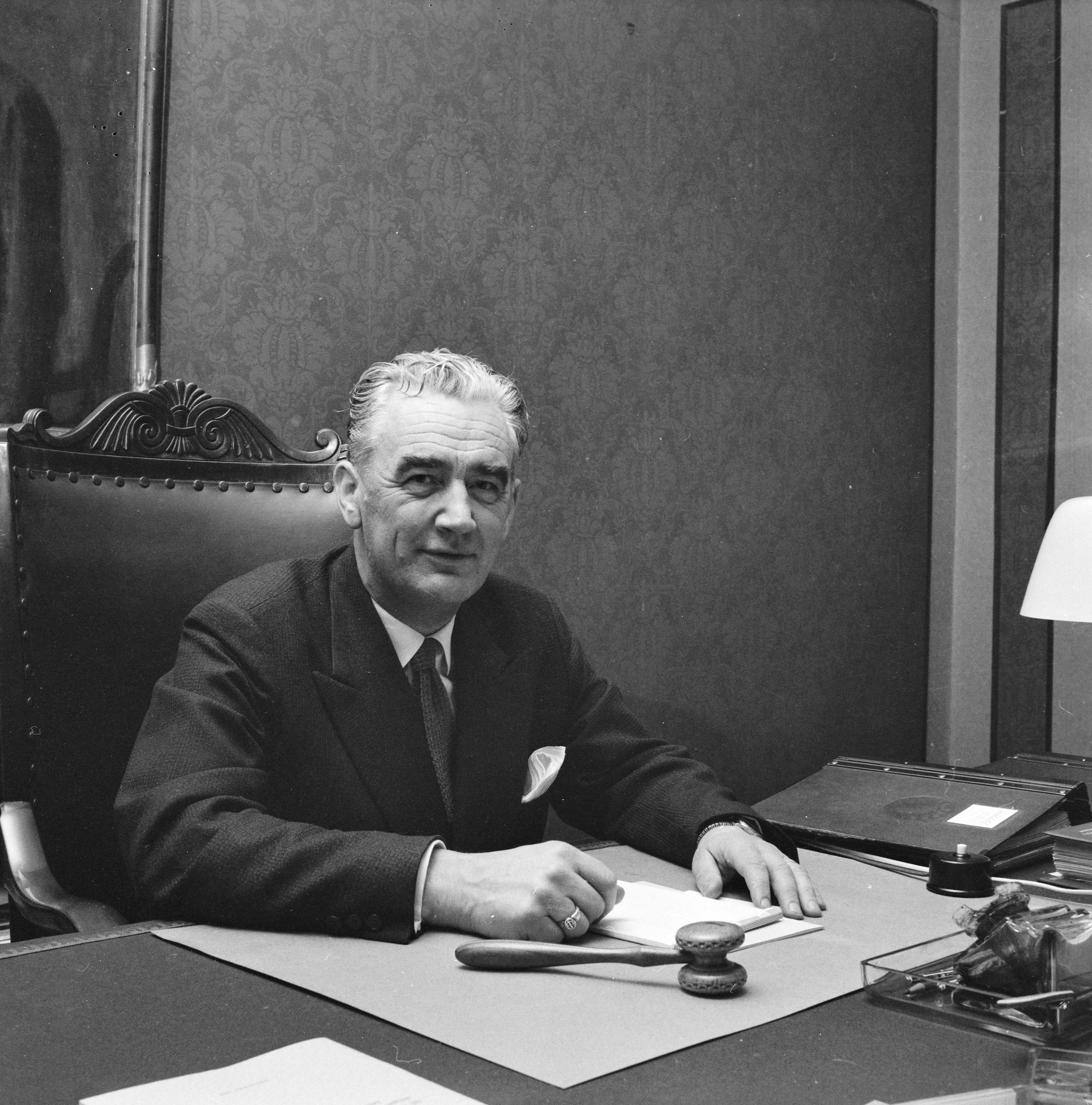
- Kuuskoski in 1958.

26th Prime Minister of Finland
- In office 26 April 1958 – 29 August 1958
- President: Urho Kekkonen
- Deputy: Tyyne Leivo-Larsson
- Preceded by: Rainer von Fieandt
- Succeeded by: Karl-August Fagerholm

Personal details
- Born: Reino Iisakki Kuuskoski; 18 January 1907 Loimaa, Grand Duchy of Finland
- Died: 27 January 1965 (aged 58) Helsinki, Finland
- Party: Agrarian League
- Education: University of Helsinki
- Profession: Lawyer

Reino Iisakki Kuuskoski (18 January 1907 – 27 January 1965) was a Finnish jurist, born in Loimaa.

Kuuskoski was a member of the Agrarian League. He performed ministerial duties in Finland on two occasions. His first ministerial appointment was between 17 November 1953 and 5 May 1954 as Minister of Justice as part of Finland's 37th Government. His second ministerial appointment was between 26 April and 29 August 1958 as Prime Minister of Finland's 43rd Government. Both governments were caretaker governments.

During his career Kuuskoski also performed the duties of the President of the Supreme Administrative Court of Finland. Kuuskoski was also Finland's seventh Parliamentary Ombudsman and one of the principal persons renewing Finnish municipal legislation.

== Cabinets ==
- Kuuskoski Cabinet

Political offices
Preceded by Rainer von Fieandt	Prime Minister of Finland; 1958	Succeeded by Karl-August Fagerholm
