= Karl-August Fagerholm =

Prime Minister of Finland (1948–1950, 1956–1957, 1958–1959)

Valtioneuvos Karl-August Fagerholm
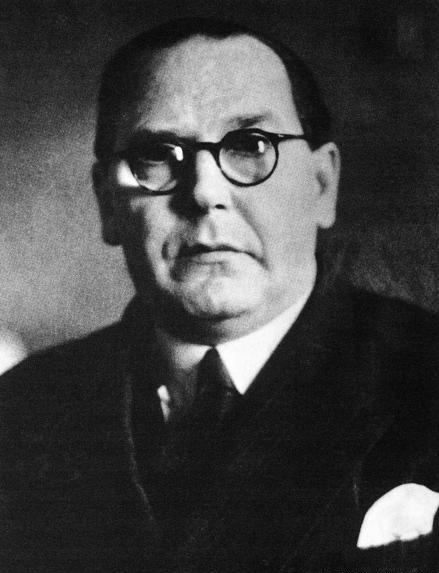
- Fagerholm in 1958

20th Prime Minister of Finland
- In office 29 August 1958 – 13 January 1959
- President: Urho Kekkonen
- Preceded by: Reino Kuuskoski
- Succeeded by: V. J. Sukselainen
- In office 3 March 1956 – 27 May 1957
- President: Urho Kekkonen
- Preceded by: Urho Kekkonen
- Succeeded by: V. J. Sukselainen
- In office 29 July 1948 – 17 March 1950
- President: Juho K. Paasikivi
- Preceded by: Mauno Pekkala
- Succeeded by: Urho Kekkonen

Personal details
- Born: 31 December 1901 Siuntio, Grand Duchy of Finland, Russian Empire
- Died: 22 May 1984 (aged 82) Helsinki, Finland
- Party: Social Democratic
- Spouse: Judith Jormala
- Children: 3

Karl-August Fagerholm (31 December 1901, in Siuntio – 22 May 1984, in Helsinki) was a Finnish politician. Fagerholm served as Speaker of Parliament and three times as Prime Minister of Finland (1948–50, 1956–57, and 1958–59). Fagerholm became one of the leading politicians of the Social Democrats after the armistice in the Continuation War. As a Scandinavia-oriented Swedish-speaking Finn, he was believed to be more to the taste of the Soviet Union's leadership than his predecessor, Väinö Tanner. Fagerholm's postwar career was, however, marked by fierce opposition from both the Soviet Union and the Communist Party of Finland. He narrowly lost the presidential election to Urho Kekkonen in 1956.

== Early life ==
Fagerholm was born in Siuntio as the youngest child of stonecutter Johan August Fagerholm and Olga Serafina Worbs (née Nordman). The elder Fagerholm died of tuberculosis in June 1901, six months before the birth of his youngest son. Fagerholm had in his youth worked as a paperboy for Hufvudstadsbladet and later as a barber, and was also briefly chairman (1920–1923) of the Barbers' Union. In 1930, he was elected member of Finland's Parliament. In the 1920s and the 1930s, the main challenge for the Social Democrats was the rehabilitation after the Finnish Civil War, in which the Social Democrats had belonged to the defeated side. A revival of anti-socialist opinion had in Finland like in many countries in Continental Europe led to a right-wing shift in public opinion and the emerge of the semi-fascist Lapua Movement. One consequence was that socialists were barred from the Cabinet 1929 to 1937. Principles of parliamentarism again were finally heeded in 1937, when Fagerholm became Minister for Social Affairs in a series of Cabinets from 1937 to 1943.

In government, Fagerholm was one of the chief executors of the neutralist Scandinavia-orientation, which had increasingly been seen by Conservatives and Socialists in the 1930s to be Finland's deliverance from the danger of Soviet expansionism. That danger seemed to have increased with fierce Soviet anticapitalist sentiments being met with equally fierce anticommunist sentiments in Finland. As a native Swedish speaker, Social Democrat, former Union leader, and head of the Ministry for Social Affairs, he was just cut out for that task, but the time that he had was too short.

== Winter War and the Continuation War ==
When the Winter War broke out, suspicions against Finland's "hazardous foreign politics" remained strong, most importantly among leading Social Democrats in Sweden. As the Winter War ended with the loss of Finnish Karelia, that was generally seen as the failure of the neutralist Scandinavia-orientation. As the Soviet Union's disapproval ended the discussions on a Swedish-Finnish defence co-operation in 1940, the Scandinavist line had run into a blind alley; and Fagerholm had no more say in the policy discussions that ultimately led to close dependency of Nazi Germany, German troops on Finnish soil, revanchism and to co-belligerence in the Continuation War.

During the Continuation War, controversies on 68,000 refugees' internment in labour camps in the vicinity of German troops, particularly on the Anthonio scandal in which eight Jewish refugees were deported to the Gestapo on 6 November 1942, prompted Fagerholm to raise the question of his resignation. After the Battle of Stalingrad, when it increasingly became obvious that Nazi Germany was about to be defeated in World War II, the Cabinet of Edwin Linkomies was appointed to seek peace with the United Kingdom and the Soviet Union. Fagerholm was not included.

The end of hostilities in September 1944 found Finland in a thoroughly weakened state economically. In addition to its human and physical losses, Finland had to deal with more than 400,000 evacuees from the territories once again lost to the Soviet Union. War reparations were another burden for Finland. The reparations paid from 1944 to 1952 amounted to an annual average of more than 2% of Finland's gross national product. The reparations were delivered according to a strict schedule, with penalties for late shipments. By inciting strikes and other disturbances at moments critical for scheduled delivers, the Soviet Union tried to strengthen the influence of the domestic Communists and to exert direct pressure on the government.

== Postwar years ==
Because of his conciliatory attitude, Fagerholm was considered more suitable for ministerial duties than Väinö Tanner, who did not enjoy the confidence of the Soviet Union. Fagerholm was open to political cooperation with the Communist Party of Finland (SKP), but did not join the group of opposition social democrats who had formed the Finnish People's Democratic League (SKDL) in 1944 together with the SKP. He was thus elected Speaker of the Parliament in 1945, and with a few exceptions remained in this position until 1962. Fagerholm's task was to rehabilitate the Social Democrats towards the Soviet Union. Furthermore, thanks to his old personal contacts, he played a key role in the reconstruction of Finland's Nordic relations and later in Finland's accession to the Nordic Council.

Fagerholm was also a candidate for chairman of the Social Democrats in 1946, but lost with only 61 votes against Emil Skog's 146.

The Soviet victory in World War II had greatly improved the prestige of their supporters in Finland. In 1946, the Communist-allied Mauno Pekkala finally won an election and became the prime minister of a coalition cabinet that included also the Social Democrats, though Fagerholm remained outside the cabinet. It was Fagerholm's conviction that Communists could not be defeated with repressive methods that had been tried since the Civil War. Communism was to be countered in free debate and free elections. The battle of the late 1940s was that in the trade unions in which boards and representatives were elected proportionally. The Social Democrats succeeded more often than not to fend off or reverse Communist takeovers.

== 1948 elections and Fagerholm as PM ==
When new parliament elections were held in July 1948, the Communists suffered a sharp drop in support, falling from 51 to 38 seats. Communists had demanded the posts of prime minister and either ministry for foreign affairs or internal affairs and so were not included in the new minority cabinet, led by Fagerholm. (There was no communist participation in Finland's government again until 1966.) Fagerholm's minority government relied mostly on support by deputies of the National Coalition Party and Liberal parties plus the conservative wing of the Agrarian League. In social policy, Fagerholm's government was notable for passing a public pension law.

As leader of the Social Democrats, he was prime minister from 1948 to 1950 despite fierce Communist opposition and accusations by the Soviet Union that he intended to undermine the Finnish-Soviet Treaty by taking Finland into NATO. Even Finland's growing integration into the world economy, as demonstrated by its joining the General Agreement on Tariffs and Trade (GATT) in 1949, was viewed with similar suspicion although it served Soviet interests since it contributed to Finland's ability to meet the harsh war reparations requirements of the Paris Peace Treaty.

Opposition from the domestic Communists, under Soviet guidance, exemplified by communist strike agitators who in 1949 tried to take over the dockworker's union and indirectly threatened the stability of the government of Karl-August Fagerholm.

== 1950s ==
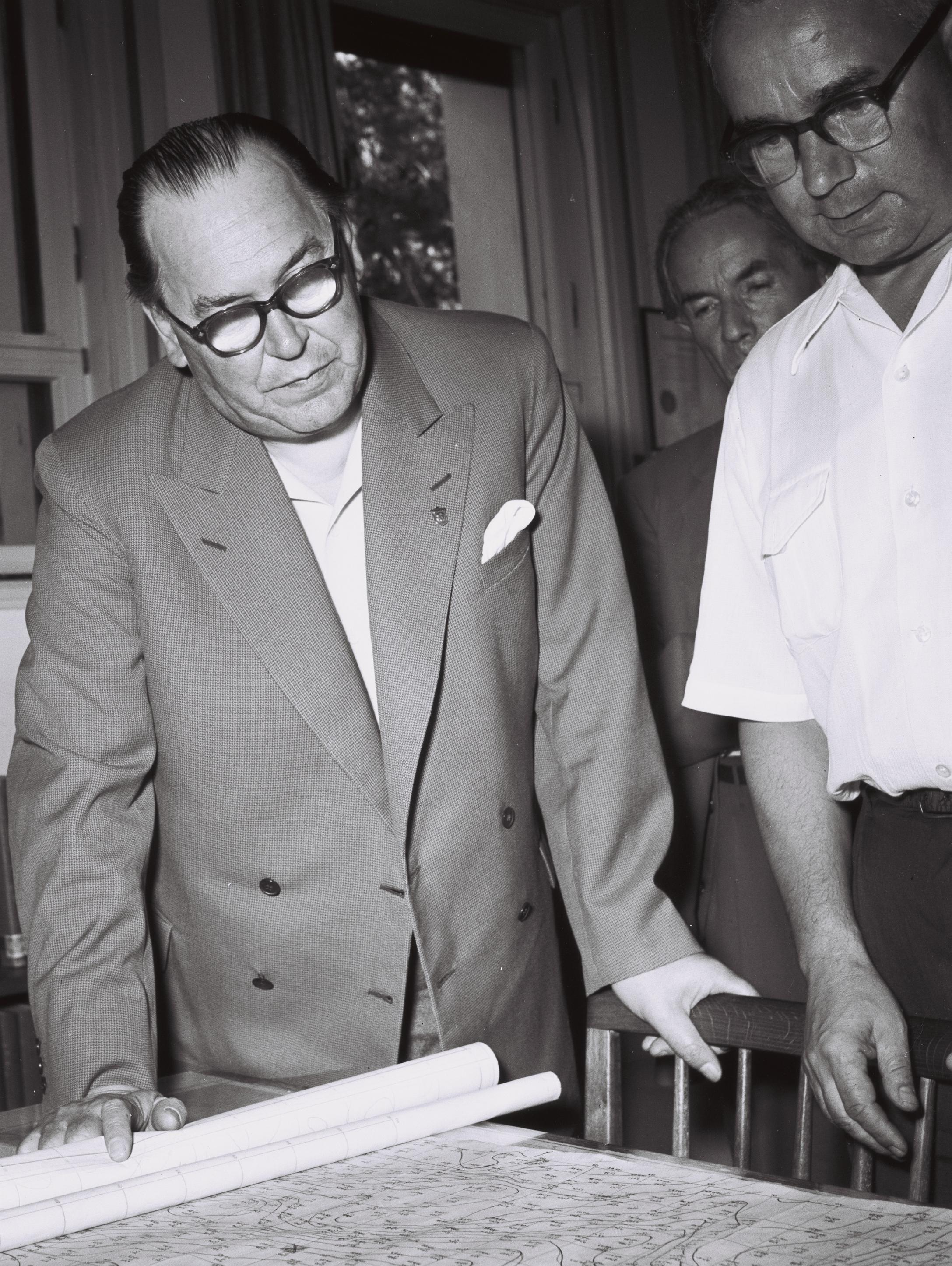
Speaker of Parliament Fagerholm at Weizmann Institute of Science in Rehovot, Israel, in 1955

The war and the post-war times of economic hardship had motivated government control of prices and wages attempting to hamper inflation. One of the themes in the elections and one of the important objectives for Fagerholm's government was to transfer the handling of incomes policy to negotiations between the unions and the employers' organizations. In January 1950, the Parliament agreed to increase wages and to end wage controls.

Soon afterward, a minority cabinet under Kekkonen assumed power. Wage negotiations ended in an impasse in the spring. A warning of general strike was issued to speed up the negotiations. In the tense situation, Fagerholm, now Speaker of Parliament, brokered a solution that was supported in ballot by a clear majority of trade union members.

Fagerholm's relation to the aged president of Finland, Juho Kusti Paasikivi, remained controversial, but the release of the latter's diary has thrown some light on the issue. Supporters of Fagerholm argue that his line in foreign politics was considerably closer to that of Paasikivi, but Fagerholm, in many aspects, was ideologically remote from the Conservative fennoman Paasikivi. Supporters of Kekkonen argue that Fagerholm's contact with the US embassy and pecuniary support from the US could not have been approved by Paasikivi. Although Paasikivi considered both contenders for the position as prime minister as skilful and politically capable, he actually came down more often in favor of Kekkonen, who enjoyed the support of the Soviet leadership.

In the 1956 Finnish presidential election Fagerholm would have won if two electors had voted otherwise; he got 149 votes to Urho Kekkonen's 151. Fagerholm instead succeeded Kekkonen as prime minister for a four-party coalition cabinet.

== Third term as Prime Minister ==
During his second term as prime minister, in 1956 to 1957, he visited the Soviet Union, and relations appeared to have improved. After a period out of office, the general elections of July 1958 again brought a Fagerholm-led coalition cabinet to office. Their chief opponents were the Communists, who had become the largest party in Parliament. Kekkonen did nothing to mitigate a Kremlin fear that Finland would abandon the careful course steered by Paasikivi and Kekkonen since the late 1940s that sought to ensure that Finland would do nothing that conflicted with the interests of the Soviet Union.

Finnish membership in the Nordic Council in 1955 and a progressive increase in trade with the Western world were seen in Moscow as harbingers of the loss of Finland to the West, particularly under a politician like Fagerholm known for Nordic sympathies and US connections. Therefore, in 1958, the Soviet government pursued an escalating policy of economic and other sanctions against the Fagerholm government, canceling discussions on a range of economic issues and trying to leave little doubt in the minds of Finns that having Fagerholm as prime minister would be exceedingly costly. Finally, on 21 October 1958, Soviet Ambassador Viktor Lebedev was suddenly recalled from Finland.

Immediately afterwards, there was a new crisis over the memoirs of Yrjö Leino, who had been Finland's Communist Minister of the Interior in the crucial period from 1945 to 1948 period and had been living in retirement ever since. The Soviets were highly displeased with Leino's writing his memoirs, and the Soviet Chargé d'Affaires Ivan Filippov demanded for Fagerholm's government to prevent their publication. Fagerholm said that the government could legally do nothing since the work had not yet been released and that there was no censorship in Finland. Filippov advised that if Leino's book was published, the Soviet Union would draw "serious conclusions". Later the same, day Fagerholm called Untamo Utrio of the Tammi publishing house and convinced him to cancel the January launch of the book. (Eventually, the entire print run of the book was destroyed, but that was long after the end of Fagerholm's term.) Deputy director of Tammi Jarl Hellemann later argued that the fuss about the book was completely disproportionate to its substance, describing the incident as the first instance of Finnish self-censorship motivated by concerns about relations to the Soviet Union.

That concession, however, was not enough to remove the Soviet pressure on Fagerholm. On 4 December 1958, Fagerholm filed his resignation. In January 1959, after Kekkonen had traveled to Leningrad to personally assure Nikita Khrushchev that Finland would be a "good neighbor" and a prime minister from Kekkonen's Agrarian Party was appointed, all economic intercourse resumed.

== Personal life ==
Fagerholm married Judith Jormala in 1926, and had three children: Brita (1927–2013), Stina (b. 1929) and Einar (b. 1935). His granddaughters Jannica (b. 1961) and Catarina (b. 1963) are well known in Finland as economists.

Fagerholm died on 22 May 1984.

== Bibliography ==
- Friherre Carl Gustaf Mannerheim. Vid Marskalkens av Finland bår. Minnestal (1951)
- Talmannens röst (1977)

== Cabinets ==
- Fagerholm I Cabinet
- Fagerholm II Cabinet
- Fagerholm III Cabinet

Political offices
Preceded by Väinö Hakkila	Speaker of the Parliament of Finland; 1945–1947	Succeeded by Urho Kekkonen
Preceded by Mauno Pekkala	Prime Minister of Finland; 1948–1950	Succeeded by Urho Kekkonen
Preceded by Urho Kekkonen	Speaker of the Parliament of Finland; 1950–1956	Succeeded by V. J. Sukselainen
Preceded by Urho Kekkonen	Prime Minister of Finland; 1956–1957	Succeeded by V. J. Sukselainen
Preceded by V. J. Sukselainen	Speaker of the Parliament of Finland; 1957	Succeeded by V. J. Sukselainen
Preceded by Reino Kuuskoski	Prime Minister of Finland; 1958–1959	Succeeded by V. J. Sukselainen
Preceded by V. J. Sukselainen	Speaker of the Parliament of Finland; 1958–1961	Succeeded by Kauno Kleemola
Preceded by Kauno Kleemola	Speaker of the Parliament of Finland; 1965	Succeeded by Rafael Paasio
