= List of female cabinet ministers of Finland =

This is a list of female cabinet ministers in Finland. There have been total 79 female cabinet ministers out of 574 ministers. Out of 79 female ministers three have served as Prime Minister.

== Political party table ==
Party	Numbers of ministers (total)
Social Democratic Party	29
National Coalition Party	22
Centre Party + Agrarian League	21
Swedish People's Party	5
Left Alliance	3
People's Democratic League	1
Green League	5
Christian Democrats	1
Liberal People's Party	1
Social Democratic Union of Workers and Smallholders	1
People's Party	2
True Finns	1
Independent	2

== List ==
Cabinet Minister	Post	Dates as minister (total)	Party	Prime Minister
Miina Sillanpää	Deputy Minister of Social Affairs (13 Dec 1926–17 Dec 1927)	370	Social Democratic Party	Väinö Tanner
Hertta Kuusinen	Minister without Portfolio (26 May 1948–4 Jun 1948); Minister at Council of State (4 Jun 1948–29 Jul 1948)	65	People's Democratic League	Mauno Pekkala
Tyyne Leivo-Larsson	Deputy Minister of Social Affairs (29 Jul 1948–17 Mar 1950) (20 Oct 1954–3 Mar 1956) (3 Mar 1956–17 May 1957) ( 2 May 1958–29 Aug 1958); Minister of Social Affairs (4 Mar 1949–18 Mar 1949) (5 May 1954–20 Oct 1954) (17 May 1957 – 27 May 1957); Minister at Council of State (26 Apr 1958–29 Aug 1958); Deputy Prime Minister (26 Apr 1958–29 Aug 1958)	1842	Social Democratic Party	Karl-August Fagerholm; Ralf Törngren; Urho Kekkonen; Karl-August Fagerholm; Reino Kuuskoski
Vieno Simonen	Minister of Social Affairs (9 Jul 1953–17 Nov 1953) (5 May 1954–20 Oct 1954); Deputy Minister of Agriculture (3 Mar 1956–27 May 1957); Minister of Social Affairs (13 Jan 1959–14 Jul 1961) (4 Jul 1961–13 Apr 1962)	1939	Agrarian League	Urho Kekkonen; Ralf Törngren; Karl-August Fagerholm; Vieno Johannes Sukselainen; Martti Miettunen
Irma Karvikko	Minister of Social Affairs (17 Nov 1953–5 May 1954); Minister of Social Affairs (27 May 1957–2 Sep 1957)	269	People's Party	Vieno Johannes Sukselainen; Sakari Tuomioja
Kerttu Saalasti	Minister of Education (20 Oct 1954–3 Mar 1956) (27 May 1957–29 Nov 1957)	688	Agrarian League	Urho Kekkonen; Vieno Johannes Sukselainen
Aino Malkamäki	Minister of Social Affairs (2 Sep 1957–29 Nov 1957)	89	Social Democratic Union of Workers and Smallholders	Vieno Johannes Sukselainen
Armi Hosia	Minister of Education (13 Apr 1962–18 Dec 1963)	615	People's Party	Ahti Karjalainen
Kyllikki Pohjala	Deputy Minister of Social Affairs (13 Apr 1962–18 Oct 1963); Minister of Social Affairs (18 Oct 1963–18 Dec 1963)	615	National Coalition Party	Ahti Karjalainen
Marja Lahti	Deputy Minister of Agriculture (12 Sep 1964–27 May 1966)	623	Centre Party	Johannes Virolainen
Margit Eskman	Minister at Council of State (1 Feb 1970–14 May 1970); Deputy Minister of Finance (23 Feb 1972–31 May 1972)	202	Social Democratic Party	Mauno Koivisto; Rafael Paasio
Anna-Liisa Tiekso	Minister of Social Affairs (22 Mar 1968–14 May 1970); Minister of Social Affairs and Health (15 Jul 1970–26 Mar 1971)	1039	People's Democratic League	Mauno Koivisto; Ahti Karjalainen
Alli Lahtinen	Deputy Minister of Social Affairs and Health (14 May 1970–15 Jul 1970); Minister of Social Affairs and Health (29 Oct 1971–23 Feb 1972) (13 Jun 1975–30 Nov 1975)	352	Independent	Teuvo Aura; Keijo Liinamaa
Meeri Kalavainen	Deputy of Minister of Education (15 Jul 1970–29 Oct 1971)	472	Social Democratic Party	Ahti Karjalainen
Katri-Helena Eskelinen	Deputy Minister of Social Affairs and Health (15 Jul 1970–29 Oct 1971) (26 May 1979–19 Feb 1982)	1473	Centre Party	Ahti Karjalainen; Mauno Koivisto
Seija Karkinen	Deputy Minister of Finance (31 May 1972–4 Sep 1972); Deputy Minister of Social Affairs and Health (4 Sep 1972–13 Jun 1975)	1109	Social Democratic Party	Rafael Paasio; Kalevi Sorsa
Marjatta Väänänen	Deputy of Minister of Education (4 Sep 1972–13 Jun 1975); Minister of Education (29 Sep 1976–15 May 1977); Deputy Minister of Social Affairs and Health (19 Feb 1982–6 May 1983)	1684	Centre Party	Kalevi Sorsa; Martti Miettunen; Kalevi Sorsa
Inkeri Anttila	Minister of Justice (13 Jun 1975–30 Nov 1975)	171	Independent	Keijo Liinamaa
Irma Toivanen	Deputy Minister of Social Affairs and Health (30 Nov 1975–29 Sep 1976) (29 Sep 1976–15 May 1977)	533	Liberal People's Party	Martti Miettunen
Pirkko Työläjärvi	Deputy Minister of Social Affairs and Health (30 Nov 1975–29 Sep 1976); Minister of Social Affairs and Health (15 May 1977 – 26 May 1979); Deputy Minister of Finance (26 May 1979–30 Jun 1981); Minister of Trade and Industry (1 Jul 1981–19 Feb 1982)	2047	Social Democratic Party	Martti Miettunen; Kalevi Sorsa; Mauno Koivisto
Orvokki Kangas	Deputy Minister of Social Affairs and Health (29 Sep 1976–15 May 1977)	229	Centre Party	Martti Miettunen
Sinikka Luja-Penttilä	Minister of Social Affairs and Health (26 May 1979–19 Feb 1982)	1001	Social Democratic Party	Mauno Koivisto
Kaarina Suonio	Deputy of Minister of Education (19 Feb 1982–31 Dec 1982); Minister of Education (31 Dec 1982–6 May 1983) (6 May 1983 – 31 May 1986)	1563	Social Democratic Party	Kalevi Sorsa
Vappu Taipale	Minister of Social Affairs and Health (1 Jul 1982–6 May 1983); Deputy Minister of Social Affairs and Health (6 May 1983–30 Nov 1984)	884	Social Democratic Party	Kalevi Sorsa
Kaisa Raatikainen	Minister of the Interior (1 Dec 1984–30 Apr 1987)	881	Social Democratic Party	Kalevi Sorsa
Pirjo Ala-Kapee	Minister of Education (1 Jun 1986–30 Apr 1987)	334	Social Democratic Party	Kalevi Sorsa
Eeva Kuuskoski	Minister of Social Affairs and Health (6 May 1983–30 Apr 1987) (26 Apr 1991–24 Apr 1992)	1821	Centre Party	Kalevi Sorsa; Esko Aho
Tarja Halonen	Deputy Minister of Social Affairs and Health (30 Apr 1987–28 Feb 1990); Minister of Justice (1 Mar 1990–26 Apr 1991); Minister for Foreign Affairs (13 Apr 1995–15 Apr 1999) (15 Apr 1999–25 Feb 2000)	3238	Social Democratic Party	Harri Holkeri; Paavo Lipponen
Helena Pesola	Minister of Social Affairs and Health (30 Apr 1987–31 Dec 1989)	977	National Coalition Party	Harri Holkeri
Anna-Liisa Kasurinen	Deputy Minister of Education (30 Apr 1987–26 Apr 1991); Deputy Minister of Communications (28 Aug 1990–26 Apr 1991)	1458	Social Democratic Party	Harri Holkeri
Ulla Puolanne	Deputy Minister of Finance (30 Apr 1987–26 Apr 1991)	1458	National Coalition Party	Harri Holkeri
Tuulikki Hämäläinen	Deputy Minister of Social Affairs and Health (1 Mar 1990–26 Apr 1991)	422	Social Democratic Party	Harri Holkeri
Elisabeth Rehn	Minister of Defence (13 Jun 1990–26 Apr 1991) (26 Apr 1991–1 Jan 1995); Deputy Minister of Social Affairs and Health (17 May 1991–1 Jan 1995)	1664	Swedish People's Party	Harri Holkeri; Esko Aho
Hannele Pokka	Minister of Justice (26 Apr 1991–30 Apr 1994); Deputy Minister of Social Affairs and Health (3 May 1991 – 17 May 1991)	1101	Centre Party	Esko Aho
Anneli Jäätteenmäki	Minister of Justice (1 May 1994–13 Apr 1995); Prime Minister (17 Apr 2003–24 Jun 2003)	417	Centre Party	Esko Aho; Anneli Jäätteenmäki
Riitta Uosukainen	Minister of Education (26 Apr 1991–11 Feb 1994)	1023	National Coalition Party	Esko Aho
Tytti Isohookana-Asunmaa	Deputy Minister of Education (Culture) (26 Apr 1991–13 Apr 1995)	1449	Centre Party	Esko Aho
Sirpa Pietikäinen	Minister of Environment (26 Apr 1991–13 Apr 1995)	1449	National Coalition Party	Esko Aho
Pirjo Rusanen	Deputy Minister of Environment (Housing) (26 Apr 1991–2 Jan 1995)	1348	National Coalition Party	Esko Aho
Anneli Taina	Minister of Environment (Housing) (2 Jan 1995–13 Apr 1995); Minister of Defence (13 Apr 1995–15 Apr 1999)	1565	National Coalition Party	Esko Aho; Paavo Lipponen
Arja Alho	Deputy Minister of Finance (13 Apr 1995–9 Oct 1997); Minister at Council of State (13 Apr 1995–9 Oct 1997); Deputy Minister of Social Affairs and Health (28 Apr 1995–9 Oct 1997)	911	Social Democratic Party	Paavo Lipponen
Tuula Linnainmaa	Ministry of Transport (13 Apr 1995–1 Apr 1997)	720	National Coalition Party	Paavo Lipponen
Sinikka Mönkäre	Deputy Environment Minister (13 Apr 1995–15 Apr 1999); Deputy Minister of Social Affairs and Health (13 Apr 1995–15 Apr 1999) (17 Apr 2003–24 Jun 2003) (24 Jun 2003–23 Sep 2005); Ministry of Labour (15 Apr 1999–25 Feb 2000); Minister of Trade and Industry (25 Feb 2000–17 Apr 2003)	3817	Social Democratic Party	Paavo Lipponen; Anneli Jäätteenmäki; Matti Vanhanen
Terttu Huttu-Juntunen	Deputy Ministry of Labour (13 Apr 1995–31 Mar 1997); Deputy Minister of Social Affairs and Health (13 Apr 1995–15 Apr 1999)	1464	Left Alliance	Paavo Lipponen
Liisa Jaakonsaari	Ministry of Labour (13 Apr 1995–15 Apr 1999)	1464	Social Democratic Party	Paavo Lipponen
Suvi-Anne Siimes	Deputy Minister of Education (Culture) (4 Sep 1998–15 Apr 1999); Deputy Minister of Environmental (Housing) (15 Apr 1999–17 Apr 2003); Coordinate Minister of Finance (15 Apr 1999–17 Apr 2003); Minister of Development (31 May 2002–17 Apr 2003)	1687	Left Alliance	Paavo Lipponen
Maija Rask	Minister of Education (15 Apr 1999–17 Apr 2003)	1464	Social Democratic Party	Paavo Lipponen
Maija Perho	Minister of Social Affairs and Health (15 Apr 1999–17 Apr 2003)	1464	National Coalition Party	Paavo Lipponen
Eva Biaudet	Minister of Social Services (15 Apr 1999–14 Apr 2000; 19 Apr 2002–17 Apr 2003)	730	Swedish People's Party	Paavo Lipponen
Tarja Filatov	Ministry of Labour (25 Feb 2000–17 Apr 2003) (17 Apr 2003–24 Jun 2003) (24 Jun 2003–19 Apr 2007)	2611	Social Democratic Party	Paavo Lipponen; Anneli Jäätteenmäki; Matti Vanhanen
Satu Hassi	Minister of Environment (15 Apr 1999–31 May 2002); Minister of Development (15 Apr 1999–31 May 2002)	1143	Green League	Paavo Lipponen
Suvi Lindén	Minister of Culture (15 Apr 1999–5 Jun 2002); Minister of Communications (19 Apr 2007–22 Jun 2010) (22 Jun 2010–22 Jun 2011)	2674	National Coalition Party	Paavo Lipponen; Matti Vanhanen; Mari Kiviniemi
Kaarina Dromberg	Minister of Culture (5 Jun 2002–17 Apr 2003)	317	National Coalition Party	Paavo Lipponen
Ulla-Maj Wideroos	Coordinate Minister of Finance (17 Apr 2003–24 Jun 2003) (24 Jun 2003–19 Apr 2007)	1464	Swedish People's Party	Anneli Jäätteenmäki; Matti Vanhanen
Tuula Haatainen	Minister of Education (17 Apr 2003–24 Jun 2003) (24 Jun 2003–23 Sep 2005); Minister of Social Affairs and Health (23 Sep 2005–19 Apr 2007)	1464	Social Democratic Party	Anneli Jäätteenmäki; Matti Vanhanen
Leena Luhtanen	Minister of Transport and Communications (17 Apr 2003–24 Jun 2003) (24 Jun 2003–23 Sep 2005); Minister of Justice (23 Sep 2005–19 Apr 2007)	1464	Social Democratic Party	Anneli Jäätteenmäki; Matti Vanhanen
Liisa Hyssälä	Minister of Social Services (17 Apr 2003–24 Jun 2003) (24 Jun 2003–19 Apr 2007); Deputy Minister of Labour (19 Apr 2007–1 Jan 2008); Minister of Social Affairs and Health (19 Apr 2007–24 May 2010)	2595	Centre Party	Anneli Jäätteenmäki; Matti Vanhanen
Tanja Saarela	Minister of Culture (17 Apr 2003–24 Jun 2003) (24 Jun 2003–19 Apr 2007)	1464	Centre Party	Anneli Jäätteenmäki; Matti Vanhanen
Paula Lehtomäki	Deputy Minister of Trade and Industry (17 Apr 2003–24 Jun 2003) [Minister for Foreign Trade and Development (17 Apr 2003–24 Jun 2003) (24 Jun 2003–2 Sep 2005) (3 Mar 2006–19 Apr 2007); Minister at Council of State (17 Apr 2003–24 Jun 2003) (24 Jun 2003–2 Sep 2005) (3 Mar 2006–19 Apr 2007); Minister of Environment (19 Apr 2007–28 Sep 2007) (11 Apr 2008–22 Jun 2010) (22 Jun 2010–22 Jun 2011)	2613	Centre Party	Anneli Jäätteenmäki; Matti Vanhanen; Mari Kiviniemi
Mari Kiviniemi	Minister for Foreign Trade and Development (2 Sep 2005–3 Mar 2006); Minister at Council of State (2 Sep 2005–3 Mar 2006); Minister for Public Administration and Local Government (19 Apr 2007–22 Jun 2010); Minister of Local Government (19 Apr 2007–1 Jan 2008); Prime Minister (22 Jun 2010–22 Jun 2011)	1709	Centre Party	Matti Vanhanen; Mari Kiviniemi
Susanna Huovinen	Minister of Transport and Communications (23 Sep 2005–19 Apr 2007); Minister of Social Services (24 May 2013 – 29 May 2015)	1310	Social Democratic Party	Matti Vanhanen; Jyrki Katainen; Alexander Stubb
Tuija Brax	Minister of Justice (19 Apr 2007–22 Jun 2010) (22 Jun 2010–22 Jun 2011)	1526	Green League	Matti Vanhanen; Mari Kiviniemi
Anne Holmlund	Minister of the Interior (19 Apr 2007–22 Jun 2010) (22 Jun 2010–22 Jun 2011)	1526	National Coalition Party	Matti Vanhanen; Mari Kiviniemi
Astrid Thors	Deputy Labour Minister (19 Apr 2007–1 Jan 2008); Minister of Migration and European Affairs (19 Apr 2007–22 Jun 2010) (22 Jun 2010–22 Jun 2011); Deputy Justice Minister (19 Apr 2007–22 Jun 2010) (22 Jun 2010–22 Jun 2011); Minister at Council of State (19 Apr 2007–22 Jun 2010) (22 Jun 2010–22 Jun 2011)	1526	Swedish People's Party	Matti Vanhanen; Mari Kiviniemi
Sari Sarkomaa	Minister of Education (19 Apr 2007–19 Dec 2008)	611	National Coalition Party	Matti Vanhanen
Henna Virkkunen	Minister of Education (19 Dec 2008–1 May 2010) (1 May 2010–22 Jun 2010) (22 Jun 2010–22 Jun 2011); Minister of Transport (22 Jun 2011–4 Apr 2014); Minister of Public Administration and Local Government (4 Apr 2014–24 Jun 2014)	2014	National Coalition Party	Matti Vanhanen; Mari Kiviniemi; Jyrki Katainen
Sirkka-Liisa Anttila	Minister of Agriculture and Forestry (19 Apr 2007–22 Jun 2010) (22 Jun 2010–22 Jun 2011)	1526	Centre Party	Matti Vanhanen; Mari Kiviniemi
Anu Vehviläinen	Ministry of Transport (19 Apr 2007–22 Jun 2010) (22 Jun 2010–22 Jun 2011); Minister of Local Government and Public Reforms (29 May 2015- Incumbent)	3677	Centre Party	Matti Vanhanen; Mari Kiviniemi; Juha Sipilä
Tarja Cronberg	Ministry of Labour (19 Apr 2007–1 Jan 2008) (1 Jan 2008–26 Jun 2009)	800	Green League	Matti Vanhanen
Anni Sinnemäki	Ministry of Labour (26 Jun 2009–22 Jun 2010) (22 Jun 2010–22 Jun 2011)	727	Green League	Matti Vanhanen
Paula Risikko	Deputy Minister of Environmental (19 Apr 2007–1 Jan 2008); Minister of Social Services (19 Apr 2007–22 Jun 2010) (22 Jun 2010–22 Jun 2011); Minister of Social Affairs and Health (22 Jun 2011–24 Jun 2014); Minister of Transport and Local Government (24 Jun 2014 -29 May 2015); Minister of the Interior (22 Jun 2016 –Incumbent)	2963 (Total); 3287	National Coalition Party	Jyrki Katainen; Alexander Stubb; Juha Sipilä
Jutta Urpilainen	Minister of Finance (22 Jun 2011–6 Jun 2014); Deputy Prime Minister (22 Jun 2011–6 Jun 2014)	1081	Social Democratic Party	Jyrki Katainen
Heidi Hautala	Minister of Development (22 Jun 2011–17 Oct 2013); Minister at Council of State (22 Jun 2011–17 Oct 2013)	849	Green League	Jyrki Katainen
Anna-Maja Henriksson	Minister of Justice (22 Jun 2011–29 May 2015)	1438	Swedish People's Party	Jyrki Katainen; Alexander Stubb
Päivi Räsänen	Minister of the Interior (22 Jun 2011–29 May 2015)	1438	Christian Democrats	Jyrki Katainen; Alexander Stubb
Krista Kiuru	Minister of Housing and Communications (22 Jun 2011–24 May 2013); Minister of Education (24 May 2013–4 Apr 2014); Minister of Education; Minister of Communications (4 Apr 2014-29 May 2015)	1438	Social Democratic Party	Jyrki Katainen; Alexander Stubb
Maria Guzenina-Richardson	Minister of Social Services (22 Jun 2011–24 May 2013)	703	Social Democratic Party	Jyrki Katainen
Merja Kyllönen	Ministry of Transport (22 Jun 2011–4 Apr 2014)	1018	Left Alliance	Jyrki Katainen
Pia Viitanen	Minister of Housing and Communications (24 May 2013–4 Apr 2014); Minister of Culture and Housing (4 Apr 2014–29 May 2015)	736	Social Democratic Party	Jyrki Katainen; Alexander Stubb
Laura Räty	Minister of Social Affairs and Health (24 Jun 2014–29 May 2015)	340	National Coalition Party	Alexander Stubb
Lenita Toivakka	Minister for European Affairs and Foreign Trade (24 Jun 2014-29 May 2015); Minister for Foreign Trade and Development (29 May 2015–Incumbent)	340 (total); 3677	National Coalition Party	Alexander Stubb; Juha Sipilä
Sanni Grahn-Laasonen	Minister of Environment (26 Sep 2014-29 May 2015); Minister of Education and Culture (29 May 2015–Incumbent)	246 (total); 3677	National Coalition Party	Alexander Stubb; Juha Sipilä
Sirpa Paatero	Minister of Development (26 Sep 2014-29 May 2015)	246	Social Democratic Party	Alexander Stubb
Anne Berner	Minister of Transport and Communications (29 May 2015–Incumbent)	3677	Centre Party	Juha Sipilä
Hanna Mäntylä	Deputy Minister of Social Affairs and Health (29 May 2015–25 Aug 2016)	455	True Finns	Juha Sipilä
Pirkko Mattila	Deputy Minister of Social Affairs and Health (25 Aug 2016–Incumbent)	3223	True Finns	Juha Sipilä
Riikka Purra	Minister of Finance (6 June 2023-Incumbent)		The Finns Party	Petteri Orpo
Elina Valtonen	Minister of Foreign Affairs (6 June 2023-Incumbent)		The National Coalition Party	Petteri Orpo
Leena Meri	Minister of Justice (6 June 2023- Incumbent)		The Finns Party	Petteri Orpo
Mari Rantanen	Ministry of the Interior			
Anna-Kaisa Ikonen	Minister of Local and Regional Government			
Anna-Maja Henriksson	Minister of Education			
Sari Multala	Minister of Science and Culture			
Sandra Bergqvist	Minister of Youth, Sport and Physical Activity			
Sari Essayah	Minister of Agriculture and Forestry			
Lulu Ranne	Minister of Transport and Communications			
Kaisa Juuso	Minister of Social Affairs and Health			
Sanni Grahn-Laasonen	Minister of Social Security			
