= Katainen cabinet =

72nd cabinet of Finland

Katainen's Cabinet
- 72nd Cabinet of Finland

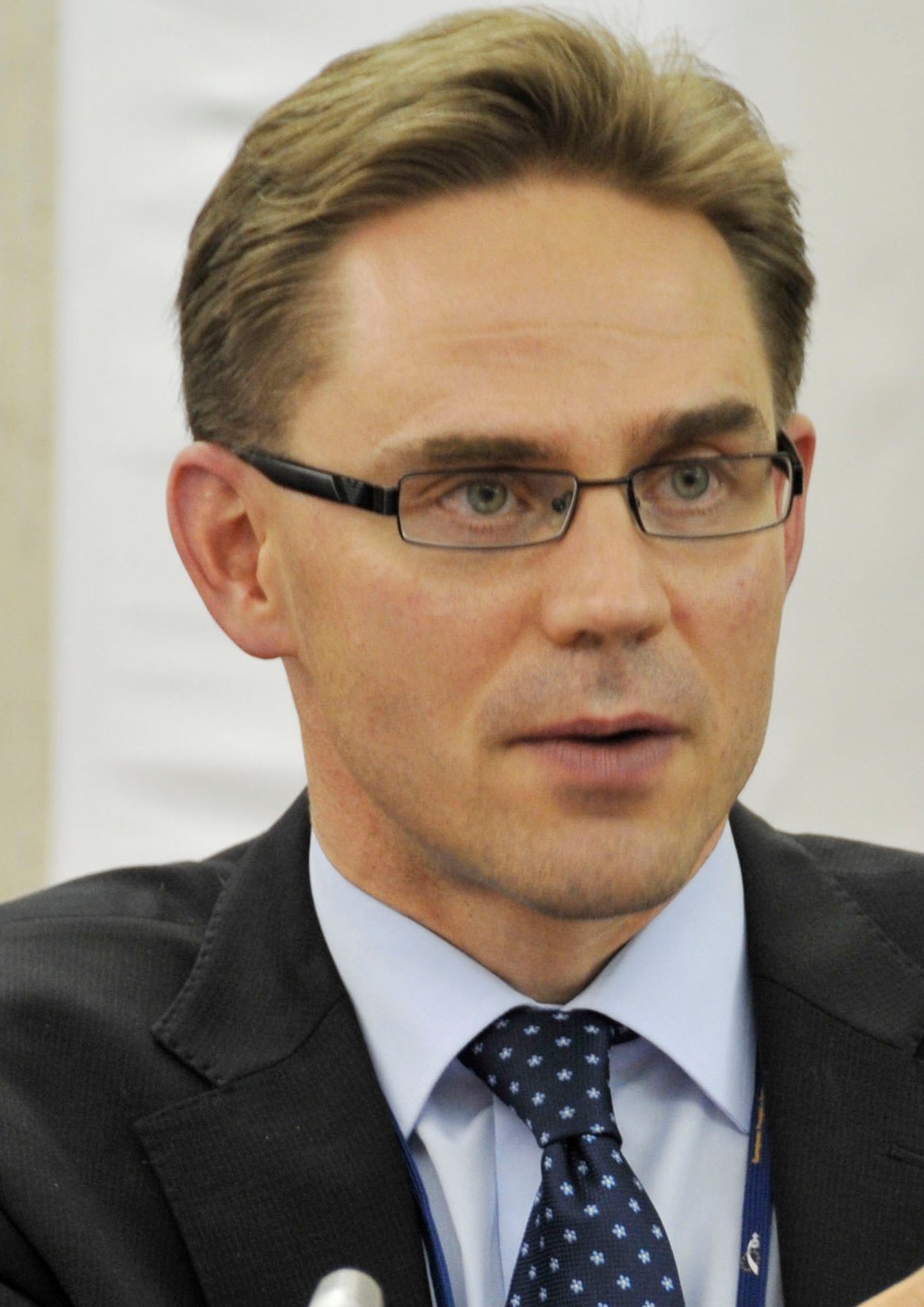
- Date formed: 22 June 2011
- Date dissolved: 24 June 2014

People and organisations
- Head of state: Tarja Halonen (2011–2012); Sauli Niinistö (2012–2014)
- Head of government: Jyrki Katainen
- No. of ministers: 19
- Member party: National Coalition Party; Social Democratic Party; Green League; Left Alliance (until April 2014); Swedish People's Party; Christian Democrats
- Status in legislature: Majority (coalition)

History
- Election: 2011 parliamentary election
- Outgoing formation: Resignation of Jyrki Katainen
- Predecessor: Kiviniemi Cabinet
- Successor: Stubb Cabinet

The Katainen Cabinet (June 22, 2011—June 24, 2014) was the 72nd cabinet of Finland, formed as a result of the 2011 post-parliamentary election negotiations between the Finnish parliamentary parties. Led by Prime Minister Jyrki Katainen of the National Coalition Party (NCP), 12 ministers of the 19-minister government represented the NCP and the Social Democratic Party (SDP), while the Left Alliance, the Green League, the Swedish People's Party (RKP) and the Christian Democrats share seven minister portfolios. On June 22, the Parliament confirmed Katainen's election as the Prime Minister and President Tarja Halonen inaugurated the government. Two Left Alliance MPs voted against Katainen, for which they were formally reprimanded by the Left Alliance's parliamentary group (and later expelled from the group). On 25 March 2014, the rest of Left Alliance left the cabinet over dispute on a package of spending cuts and tax rises.

In June 2014 Katainen stepped down as party chairman and Prime Minister of Finland for a new position in the European Union. Katainen was replaced by Alexander Stubb as chairman of the National Coalition Party and thus chosen to be the next prime minister. Katainen's cabinet was succeeded by the cabinet of Alexander Stubb on 24 June 2014.

== Ministers ==
The NCP had six ministers in the Cabinet, as did the SDP. The Left Alliance, the Green League and the SPP had two ministers each and the Christian Democrats had one. The NCP, SDP, Left Alliance, RKP and Christian Democrats announced their propositions for ministerial portfolios during the weekend of June 17—19 and the Green League announced its ministers on June 20.

| Portfolio | Minister | Took office | Left office | Party |
|---|---|---|---|---|
| Prime Minister | Jyrki Katainen | 22 June 2011 | 24 June 2014 | National Coalition |
| Minister of Finance; Deputy Prime Minister | Jutta Urpilainen | 22 June 2011 | 6 June 2014 | SDP |
| Minister of Finance; Deputy Prime Minister | Antti Rinne | 6 June 2014 | 24 June 2014 | SDP |
| Minister for Foreign Affairs | Erkki Tuomioja | 22 June 2011 | 24 June 2014 | SDP |
| Minister for European Affairs and Foreign Trade | Alexander Stubb | 22 June 2011 | 24 June 2014 | National Coalition |
| Minister for International Development | Heidi Hautala | 22 June 2011 | 17 October 2013 | Green |
| Minister for International Development | Pekka Haavisto | 17 October 2013 | 24 June 2014 | Green |
| Minister of Justice | Anna-Maja Henriksson | 22 June 2011 | 24 June 2014 | RKP |
| Minister of the Interior | Päivi Räsänen | 22 June 2011 | 24 June 2014 | KD |
| Minister of Defence | Stefan Wallin | 22 June 2011 | 5 July 2012 | RKP |
| Minister of Defence | Carl Haglund | 5 July 2012 | 24 June 2014 | RKP |
| Minister of Public Administration and Local Government | Henna Virkkunen | 22 June 2011 | 24 June 2014 | National Coalition |
| Minister of Education and Communications | Krista Kiuru | 4 April 2014 | 24 June 2014 | SDP |
| Minister of Culture and Sport | Paavo Arhinmäki | 22 June 2011 | 4 April 2014 | Left Alliance |
| Minister of Education | Jukka Gustafsson | 22 June 2011 | 24 May 2013 | SDP |
| Minister of Education | Krista Kiuru | 24 May 2013 | 24 June 2014 | SDP |
| Minister of Agriculture and Forestry | Jari Koskinen | 22 June 2011 | 24 June 2014 | National Coalition |
| Minister of Transport and Local Government | Henna Virkkunen | 22 June 2011 | 4 April 2014 | National Coalition |
| Minister of Transport | Merja Kyllönen | 22 June 2011 | 4 April 2014 | Left Alliance |
| Minister of Economic Affairs | Jyri Häkämies | 22 June 2011 | 16 November 2012 | National Coalition |
| Minister of Economic Affairs | Jan Vapaavuori | 16 November 2012 | 24 June 2014 | National Coalition |
| Minister of Labour | Lauri Ihalainen | 22 June 2011 | 24 June 2014 | SDP |
| Minister of Social Affairs and Health | Paula Risikko | 22 June 2011 | 24 June 2014 | National Coalition |
| Minister of Health and Social Services | Maria Guzenina-Richardson | 22 June 2011 | 24 May 2013 | SDP |
| Minister of Health and Social Services | Susanna Huovinen | 24 May 2013 | 24 June 2014 | SDP |
| Minister of the Environment | Ville Niinistö | 22 June 2011 | 24 June 2014 | Green |
| Minister of Culture and Housing | Pia Viitanen | 4 April 2014 | 24 June 2014 | SDP |
| Minister of Housing and Communications | Krista Kiuru | 22 June 2011 | 24 May 2013 | SDP |
| Minister of Housing and Communications | Pia Viitanen | 24 May 2013 | 24 June 2014 | SDP |

Prior to being appointed minister, Hautala, Haglund and Koskinen were not MPs. Hautala and Haglund were MEPs, while Koskinen was a board member of the European Bank for Reconstruction and Development.

=== Resignation ===
Minister for International Development Heidi Hautala resigned the government in October 2013. This was linked to Greenpeace demonstrations against petroleum exploration in the Arctic by the Finnish state-owned firm Arctia and Gazprom Prirazlomnoye field in September 2013.

On 25 March 2014, the Left Alliance left the cabinet over a dispute regarding spending cuts and tax increases. Their ministerial portfolios were redistributed among the biggest parties, but no new ministers were appointed. Minister of Public Administration and Local Government Henna Virkkunen was given the duties of the Minister of Transport, while Minister of Housing and Communications Pia Viitanen became in charge of Culture and Sport.

== Government platform ==
On 17 June, the new government announced its platform for the years 2011—2015. Upon its announcement, Helsingin Sanomat highlighted its main points as follows:

=== Economy ===
==== Budget cuts and tax increases ====
- the state assets will increase by €2.5 billion, one half comes from increase in taxation and the other from budget cuts
- the main items of expenditure subject to budget cuts are equalization payments, military spending and development aid

- budget cuts:

- equalization payments from the state to municipalities: –€ 600 million
- military spending: –€ 200 million
- level of development aid will be frozen in 2013 and 2014
- industrial subsidies: –€ 100 million
- compensations for costs of medications included in the medical insurance: –€ 100 million

- increases in taxation:

- Capital gain tax (e.g. on sales profits, rent income, dividends) will go up to 30 %; the tax will be 32 % on the part exceeding € 50,000 per year (as opposed to the previous flat tax on all capital income)
- gasoline tax will increase by 10 %
- taxes on car ownership, alcohol, tobacco, sweets and soft drinks will increase
- tax-deductibility on interest payments of mortgages will decrease gradually from 100 % down to 75 % by the end of the parliamentary term
- tax-deductibility on purchased household services (e.g. cleaning) will be reduced to € 2,000 per year
- a new tax of 9 % will be imposed on subscriptions to newspapers and journals (as opposed to their previous tax-freedom)

==== Social benefits ====
- Basic Allowance (an optional form of Unemployment Allowance, the other being Earnings-Related Allowance) and the Labour Market Subsidy will increase by €100 per month
- General Housing Allowance: the rent limit, rendering an allowance-seeker ineligible, will increase
- Basic part of the Subsistence Benefit will increase by 6%
- "special support" will be allocated for single parents
- Study Grant will follow the Finnish cost-of-living index since the autumn of 2014

=== Municipality reform ===
- the new government will implement "large-scale, structural reforms" on municipalities, by forming municipalities accordingly to "the sphere where people come to work to the relevant municipality" and the "vitality" of the municipality; the government will "specify the criteria of the reform" by late 2011

=== Work careers ===
- while regarding "the extension of work careers inevitable for maintaining a sustainable worker—pensioner ratio and balancing state finances", the new government will "prepare work pension policies in cooperation with the key labour market organizations"
- "special concerns" regard:

- prevention of work incapacity
- development of professional skills

=== European Union ===
- Finland will "strive for participation in key projects of the EU" and "criticism of the EU by the citizens will be taken seriously".

=== Energy ===
- the new government "is committed not to grant permissions for new nuclear plants, therefore dismissing Fortum's petition to build one"

=== Immigration ===
- the government "takes a positive stance on immigration", holding that "immigrants are a permanent and welcome part of the Finnish society"
- the government considers the assimilation of immigrants and prevention of discrimination "central" during this tenure
- the government strives for an immigration policy that "supports the build-up of a tolerant, safe and pluralistic Finland and strengthens Finland's international competitiveness"

=== Finnish Broadcasting Company ===
- the funding of the Finnish Broadcasting Company (Yleisradio, YLE) "will be agreed upon during 2011"
- the government will "reform the funding" as agreed upon by the parliamentary groups in March 2010

=== Abortion ===
- the government "strives for a decrease in abortion rates"
- the new government will implement a "study on whether the week limit (20) for induced abortion should be altered"; this may "mean that the government considers making abortion laws stricter"
- the government wants "to secure the counseling of and support for women seeking for abortion"

=== Geriatric care ===
- to secure a standard level for geriatric care, a law on geriatric care will be introduced

== Income gap ==
The gap between the top earners and those worst-off grew during the Katainen Cabinet. The government made many decisions that favored the richest citizens such as the removal of business angel investment taxation. Many tax allowances favored the rich, for example, the household renovation reduction and private retirement funds.

== Citizens' initiatives ==
During Jyrki Katainen's cabinet, the Parliament of Finland received its first citizens' initiatives. The first citizens' initiative aimed to ban fur farming, but it was rejected on 19 June 2013 by a majority vote in the parliament. Five more initiatives followed concerning themes such as same-sex marriage, changes to piracy laws and the abolishment of mandatory Swedish.

== See also ==
- Stubb Cabinet

| Preceded by Mari Kiviniemi's cabinet | Jyrki Katainen's cabinet June 22, 2011 — 24 June 2014 | Succeeded by Alexander Stubb's cabinet |
