= Stubb cabinet =

73rd cabinet of Finland

Stubb's Cabinet
- 73rd Cabinet of Finland

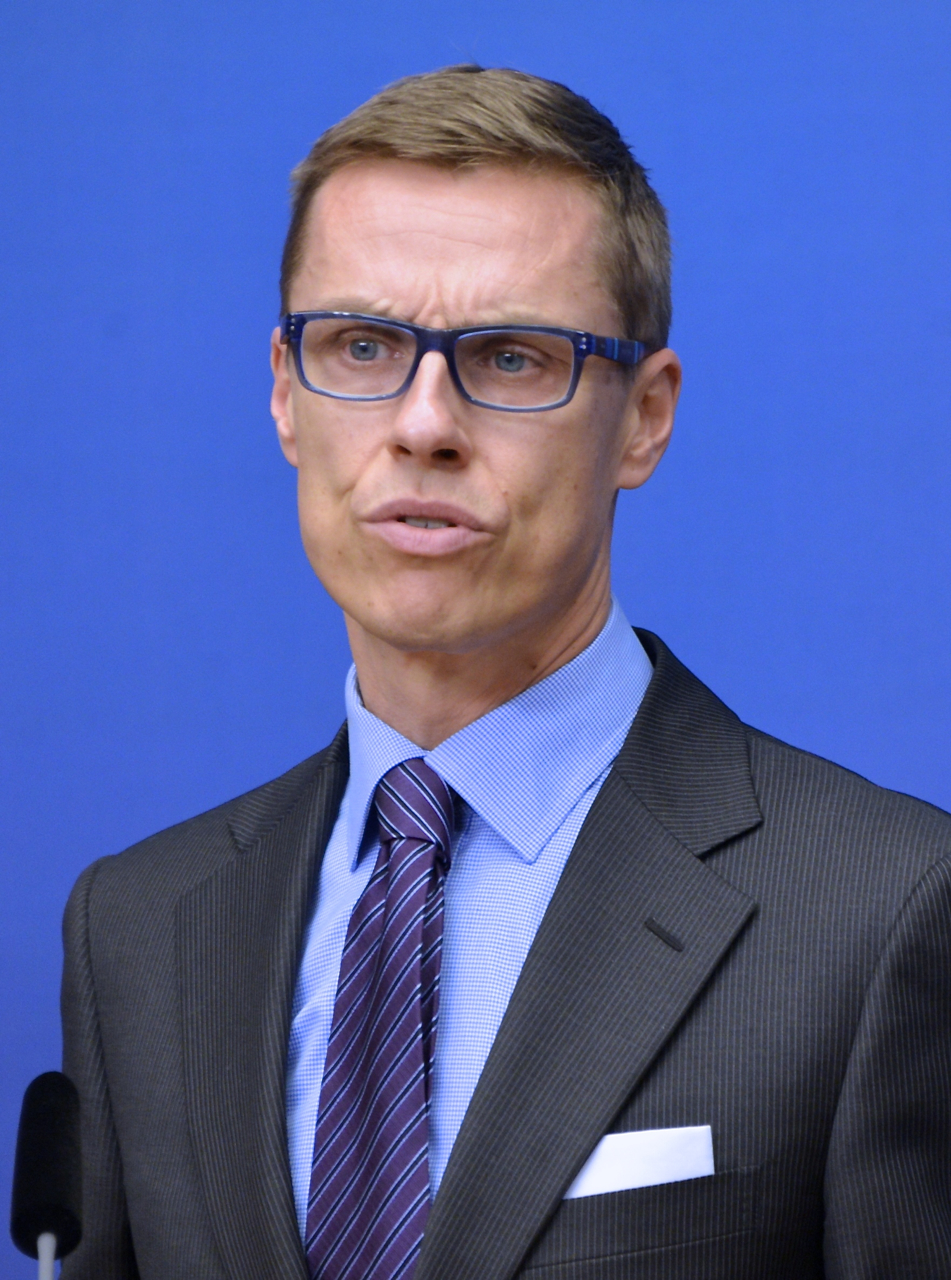
- Date formed: 24 June 2014
- Date dissolved: 29 May 2015

People and organisations
- Head of state: Sauli Niinistö
- Head of government: Alexander Stubb
- No. of ministers: 17
- Member party: National Coalition Party; Social Democratic Party; Green League (until September 2014); Swedish People's Party; Christian Democrats
- Status in legislature: Majority (coalition)

History
- Predecessor: Katainen Cabinet
- Successor: Sipilä Cabinet

The Stubb Cabinet was the 73rd Government of Finland, which stepped into office on 24 June 2014. It succeeded Jyrki Katainen's cabinet. The cabinet's prime minister was Alexander Stubb.

In September 2014, the Green League announced its departure from the cabinet after the majority of the cabinet voted to approve a new decision-in-principle for the Fennovoima nuclear project.

The portfolios held by Green League were divided between the leading National Coalition Party and the Social Democratic Party. Sirpa Paatero was chosen as the Minister for International Development and Sanni Grahn-Laasonen as Minister of the Environment.

After the Greens ceased their support for Stubb's government and left it, Stubb cabinet's strength was reduced to 101 out of 200 in the Eduskunta, which is a bare majority.

The Stubb Cabinet was succeeded by the Sipilä Cabinet headed by Centre Party leader Juha Sipilä on 29 May 2015.

== Ministers ==
The NCP had six ministers in the Cabinet as did the SDP. The Green League and the Swedish People's Party had two ministers each and the Christian Democrats had one.

Cabinet members
Portfolio	Minister	Took office	Left office	Party
Prime Minister	Alexander Stubb	24 June 2014	29 May 2015	National Coalition
Minister of Finance; Deputy Prime Minister	Antti Rinne	24 June 2014	29 May 2015	SDP
Minister for Foreign Affairs	Erkki Tuomioja	24 June 2014	29 May 2015	SDP
Minister for European Affairs and Foreign Trade	Lenita Toivakka	24 June 2014	29 May 2015	National Coalition
Minister of Justice	Anna-Maja Henriksson	24 June 2014	29 May 2015	RKP
Minister of the Interior	Päivi Räsänen	24 June 2014	29 May 2015	KD
Minister for International Development	Pekka Haavisto	24 June 2014	26 September 2014	Green
Minister for International Development	Sirpa Paatero	26 September 2014	29 May 2015	SDP
Minister of Defence	Carl Haglund	24 June 2014	29 May 2015	RKP
Minister of Transport and Local Government	Paula Risikko	24 June 2014	29 May 2015	National Coalition
Minister of Education and Communications	Krista Kiuru	24 June 2014	29 May 2015	SDP
Minister of Culture and Housing	Pia Viitanen	24 June 2014	29 May 2015	SDP
Minister of Agriculture and Forestry	Petteri Orpo	24 June 2014	29 May 2015	National Coalition
Minister of Economic Affairs	Jan Vapaavuori	24 June 2014	29 May 2015	National Coalition
Minister of Social Affairs and Health	Laura Räty	24 June 2014	29 May 2015	National Coalition
Minister of Health and Social Services	Susanna Huovinen	24 June 2014	29 May 2015	SDP
Minister of Labour	Lauri Ihalainen	24 June 2014	29 May 2015	SDP
Minister of the Environment	Ville Niinistö	24 June 2014	26 September 2014	Green
Minister of the Environment	Sanni Grahn-Laasonen	26 September 2014	29 May 2015	National Coalition

== Environmental policy ==
The Stubb Cabinet's environmental minister Sanni Grahn-Laasonen (kok.) cancelled the environmental program intended to protect the wetlands, instead favouring an approach based on voluntary protection. Former Minister of the Environment Ville Niinistö (vihr.) criticised the decision. The Greens left the cabinet following the cabinet's decision to back the Hanhikivi nuclear power plant with ties to Russian state-owned Rosatom.

== See also ==
- Politics of Finland

Preceded by Katainen Cabinet	Stubb Cabinet; 24 June 2014 — 29 May 2015	Succeeded by Sipilä Cabinet
