= Karoliina Partanen =

Finnish politician (born 1983)

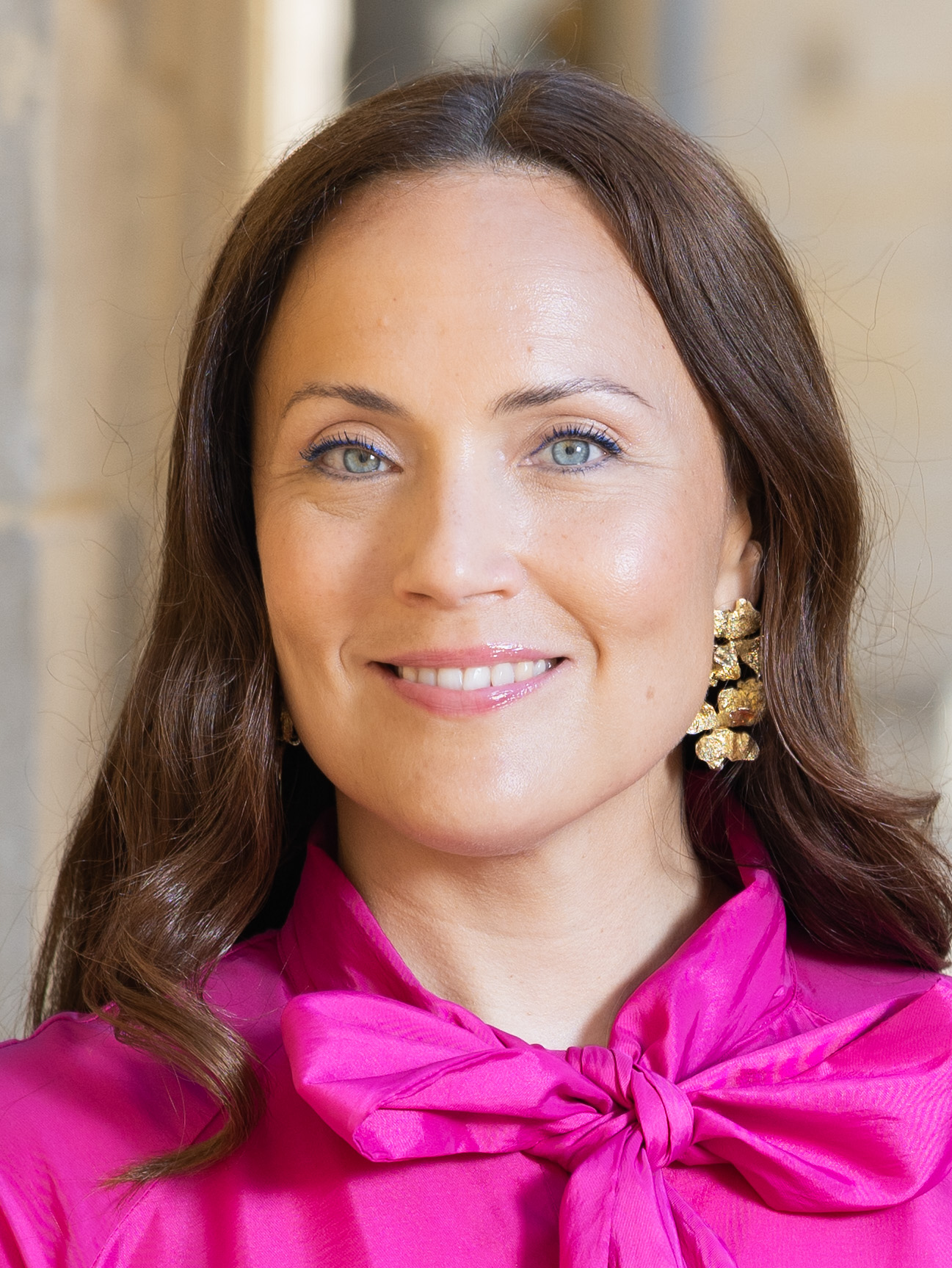
- Partanen in 2026

Minister of Social Security
- Incumbent
- Assumed office 16 June 2026
- Preceded by: Sanni Grahn-Laasonen

Personal details
- Born: 1 January 1983 (age 43)
- Party: National Coalition Party

Anna Karoliina Partanen (born 1 January 1983) is a Finnish politician serving as minister of social security since 2026. She has been a member of the Parliament of Finland since 2023.
