= Aki Lindén =

Finnish politician

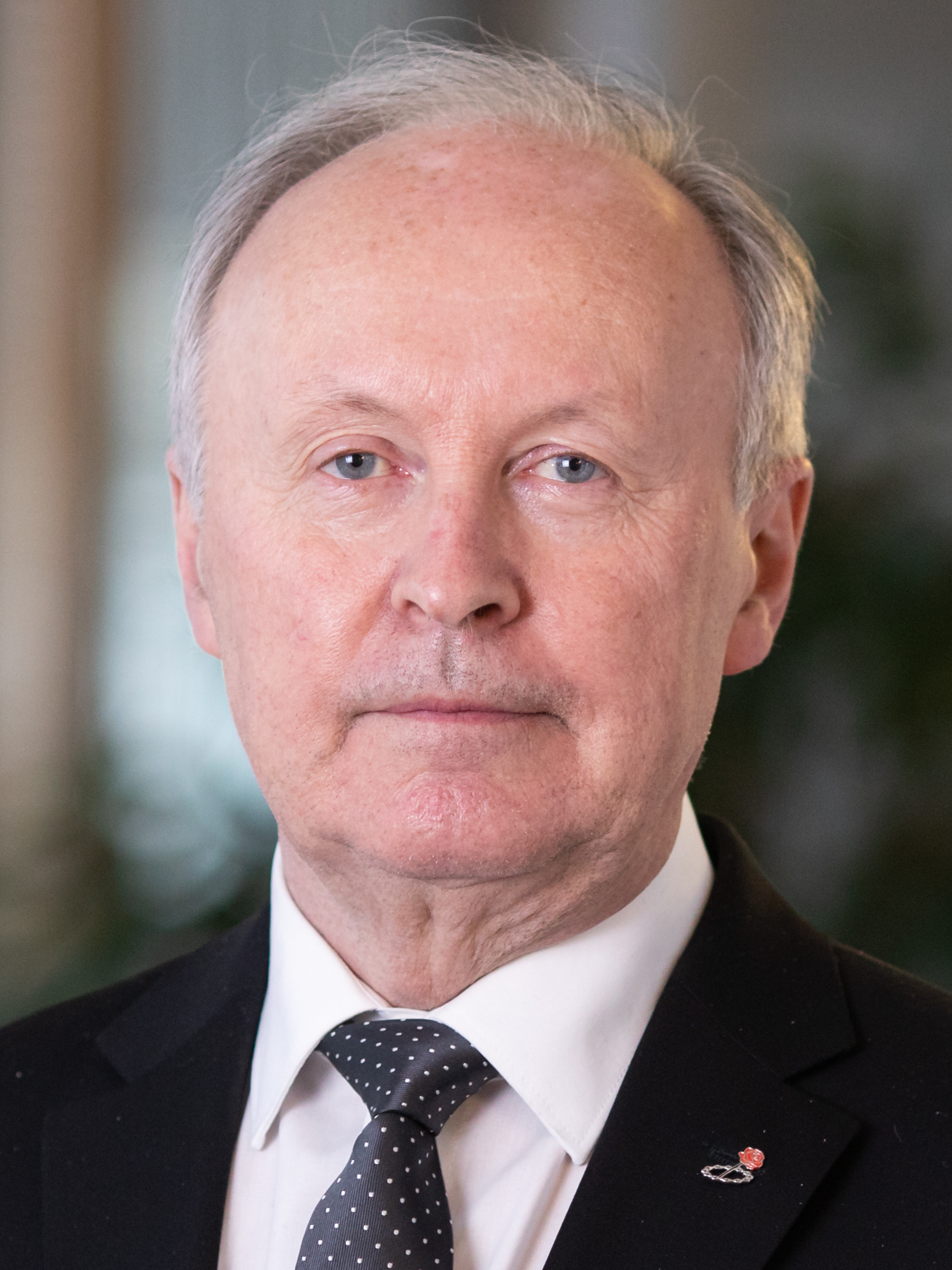
- Lindén in 2022

Minister of Family Affairs and Social Services
- In office 4 February 2022 – 6 October 2022
- Prime Minister: Sanna Marin
- Preceded by: Krista Kiuru
- Succeeded by: Krista Kiuru

Member of the Finnish Parliament for Finland Proper
- Incumbent
- Assumed office April 17, 2019
- Parliamentary group: Social Democratic Party

Personal details
- Born: Aki Lindén; 19 April 1952 (age 74) Copenhagen, Denmark
- Party: Social Democratic Party (1994−); Finnish People's Democratic League (1977-1994)
- Education: University of Turku
- Occupation: Physician
- Website: https://akilinden.fi/

Aki Alexander Felix Lindén is a Finnish Member of Parliament, representing the Social Democratic Party of Finland from the constituency of Finland Proper.

Prior to being elected as MP in 2019, Lindén worked in healthcare administration, retiring from his career as the CEO of the Joint Authority of the Helsinki and Uusimaa Hospital District, the largest healthcare provider in Finland, in 2018. He is a proponent of the welfare state.

His interest with politics was sparked in secondary school. Lindén was first active in student organisations, entering party politics during his university years. He served in the city council of Turku from 1977 up until 1997. Owing to his lengthy career in healthcare, he is an active influencer in health policy.
