= Juha Rehula =

Finnish politician

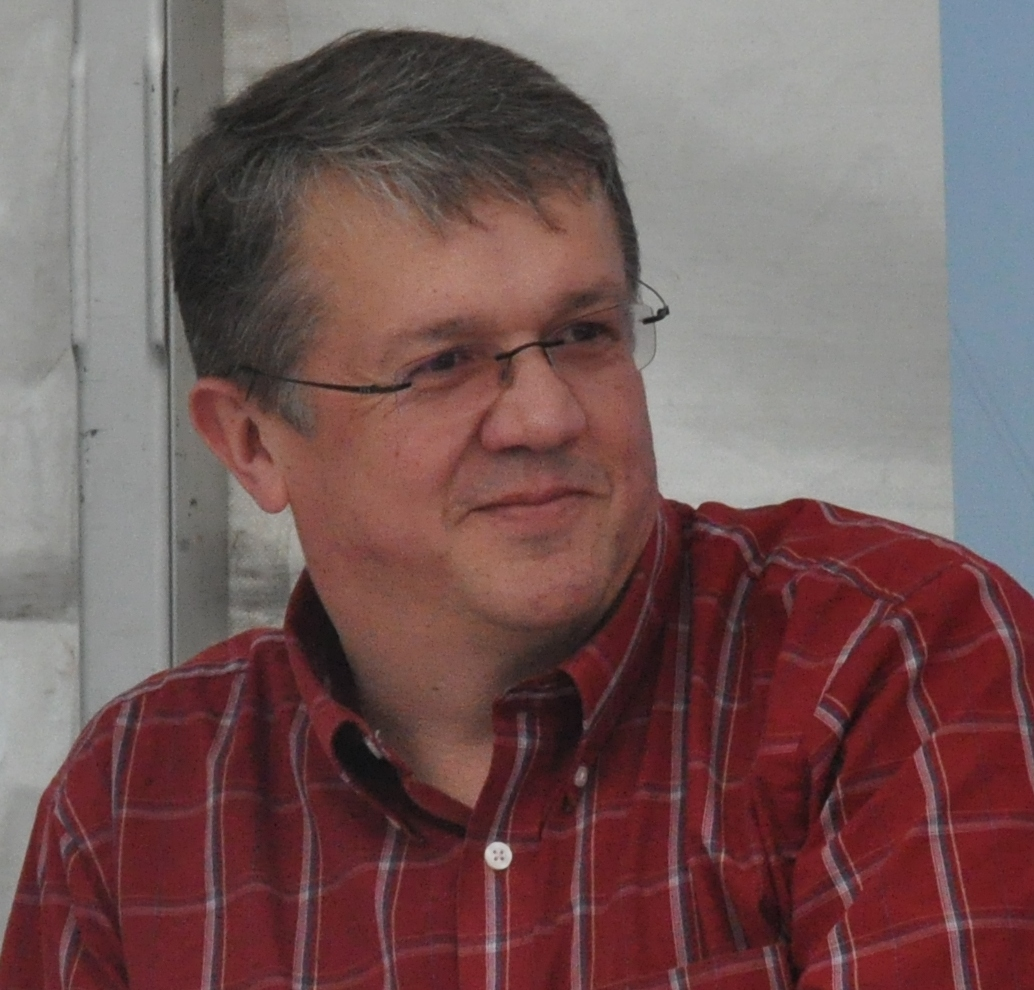
- Juha Rehula in 2009.

Minister of Social Affairs and Health
- In office 24 May 2010 – 22 June 2011
- Prime Minister: Matti Vanhanen; Mari Kiviniemi
- Preceded by: Liisa Hyssälä
- Succeeded by: Paula Risikko

Minister of Family Affairs and Social Services
- In office 29 May 2015 – 10 July 2017
- Prime Minister: Juha Sipilä
- Preceded by: Susanna Huovinen
- Succeeded by: Annika Saarikko

Personal details
- Born: 3 June 1963 (age 62) Hollola, Finland
- Party: Centre Party

Juha Tapani Rehula (born 3 June 1963 in Hollola, Finland) is a Finnish politician and the vice chairman of the Finnish Centre Party. Rehula worked as the Minister of Social Affairs and Health in Finland between 2010–2011 and Minister of Family Affairs and Social Services 2015–2017. He was a member of the Finnish Parliament from 1996 until 2019.

As a minister of Family Affairs and Social Services, Rehula was one of the three key ministers in the area of social policy and income. The project of negative income tax was shared with Rehula, Minister of Social Affairs and Health Hanna Mäntylä, and Minister of Justice and Labour Jari Lindström.

In July 2023, Rehula was chosen as the municipal manager of Padasjoki for a temporary one-year-long contract.
