= Kyllikki Pohjala =

Finnish politician and nurse (1894–1979)

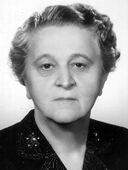

Finland Minister of Social Affairs
- In office 18 October 1963 – 18 December 1963
- Prime Minister: Ahti Karjalainen

Member of the Parliament of Finland
- In office 1 September 1933 – 19 February 1962
- Constituency: Turku Province North

Personal details
- Born: 11 November 1894 Nakkila, Finland
- Died: 22 September 1979 (aged 84) Helsinki, Finland
- Party: National Coalition Party
- Education: Columbia University (BS)

Kyllikki Pohjala (11 November 1894 – 22 September 1979) was a Finnish politician and nurse. She was a member of the Parliament of Finland from 1933 to 1962 and served as the minister of social affairs from October to December 1963.

Born in Nakkila, Pohjala was a nurse in the Finnish Civil War and Estonian War of Independence and studied nursing education at Columbia University in the 1920s. After she returned to Finland, she was elected to Parliament in 1933, representing Turku Province North as a member of the National Coalition Party. Pohjala worked on healthcare and welfare issues during her time in Parliament, but grew interested in foreign policy during and after World War II. In the 1950s, she became a Finnish representative in the Inter-Parliamentary Union and the United Nations General Assembly.

In 1962, she was appointed second minister of social affairs by prime minister Ahti Karjalainen, and was promoted to minister of social affairs in October 1963. She drafted legislation that introduced nationwide health insurance in Finland. Pohjala retired in December 1963 when Karjalainen's government disbanded.

== Education and nursing career ==
Pohjala was born on 11 November 1894 in Nakkila, Finland. She was the daughter of Topias Pohjala, a fisherman, and Josefina Brander. She graduated from secondary school in Pori in 1914, and became a reporter for the regional newspaper. Pohjala then attended a nursing school run by Sophie Mannerheim in Helsinki, graduating in 1917, and worked as a nurse in the Finnish Civil War in 1918 and the Estonian War of Independence in 1918–1919. She received six decorations from Finland, Estonia, and Latvia for "heroism under fire". After the wars, she worked as a nurse in Harjavalta in 1919 and 1920.

In 1920, Pohjala, who did not speak any English at the time, moved to the United States to continue her nursing studies. She worked at NYU Lutheran Medical Center and Columbia-Presbyterian Medical Center for five years, learning English and earning money for her education. Pohjala studied nursing education at Columbia University, where she received the Bachelor of Science degree in 1927. After graduating, she returned to Finland and became the editor-in-chief of the nursing trade magazine Sairaanhoitaja, a position she held until 1963. She was also the president of the Finnish Nurses Association between 1935 and 1963.

== Political career ==
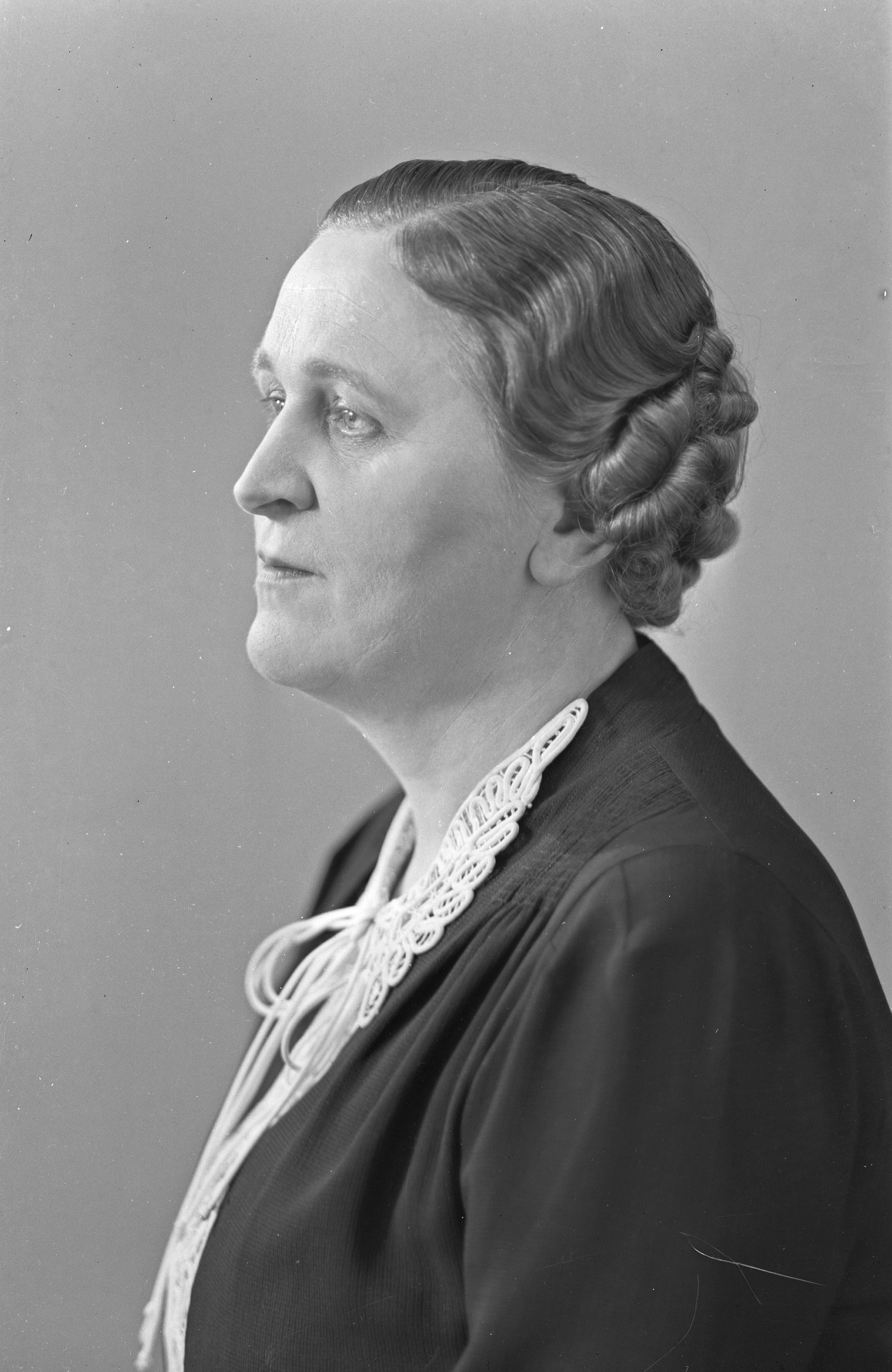
Pohjala in 1938

=== Member of Parliament (1933–1962) ===
Pohjala's colleagues from her time as a military nurse in the 1910s encouraged her to run in the 1933 Finnish parliamentary election. She ran and won the election to represent the Turku Province North constituency (now Satakunta), taking office on 1 September 1933. She was an unaffiliated candidate in the election but joined the National Coalition Party after she was elected. Pohjala was a member of Parliament for almost 30 years, serving continuously until 19 February 1962.

As a member of Parliament, Pohjala frequently focused on healthcare and welfare issues, informed by her experiences as a nurse. Her first bill, which provided funding for the renovation of a state hospital in Pori, was passed by the legislature. She advocated for the expansion of hospitals, including the construction of a pediatrics department of the Helsinki general hospital. Pohjala also worked to improve the social status of nurses and expand municipal healthcare, frequently working on bipartisan legislation with representatives from left-wing parties, including Miina Sillanpää and Hilja Pärssinen of the Social Democratic Party. She later remarked that as a woman legislator, she did not receive as much respect from the National Coalition Party compared to women representatives in other parties.

Pohjala was strongly opposed to the signing of the Moscow Peace Treaty at the conclusion of the Winter War with the Soviet Union in 1940. When she traveled to England after the war, German forces invaded Norway and she was unable to return to Finland. She received an invitation from United States President Herbert Hoover and traveled to the U.S. where she met with Finnish American groups and was eventually able to return to her country. During the Continuation War, Pohjala was a member of Suomen Huolto, an organization that provided aid to civilians.

After the conclusion of World War II, Pohjala continued her involvement in foreign policy. She joined the Foreign Affairs Committee in 1945, and was the committee's vice chair from 1949 to 1957 and from 1961 to 1962. She joined the Finnish Group in the Inter-Parliamentary Union, chairing the group's executive committee from 1959 to 1962, and was a member of the Finnish delegation to the United Nations General Assembly from 1957 to 1962.

=== Karjalainen cabinet (1962–1963) ===
Pohjala was appointed second minister of social affairs by prime minister Ahti Karjalainen on 13 April 1962. She later wrote that the appointment came as a surprise because few women from the National Coalition Party had ever been appointed as minister. She was promoted to Minister of Social Affairs on 18 October 1963. During her time in the Ministry of Social Affairs, Pohjala introduced the Health Insurance Act, which provided medical insurance to all residents of Finland. When Karjalainen's term ended on 18 December 1963 due to the resignations of ministers who were sympathetic to the Central Organisation of Finnish Trade Unions, Pohjala retired from politics.

== Later life and death ==
Pohjala published a memoir, Kuljin tietäni ("I Trod My Path"), in 1966. She died on 22 September 1979 in Helsinki, at the age of 84.

== See also ==
- List of Cabinet Ministers from Finland by ministerial portfolio
