= Sinikka Luja-Penttilä =

Finnish politician and writer (1924–2022)

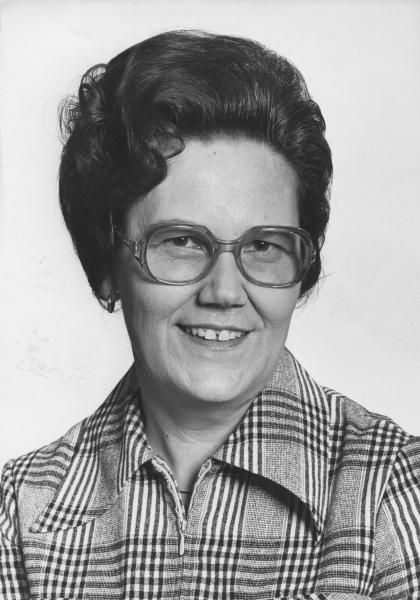
- Luja-Penttilä in 1970

Member of the Parliament of Finland
- In office 5 April 1966 – 25 March 1983
- Constituency: Uusimaa

Minister of Social Affairs and Health
- In office 26 May 1979 – 19 February 1982
- Prime Minister: Mauno Koivisto

Personal details
- Born: 9 June 1924 Antrea, Finland
- Died: 18 November 2022 (aged 98) Espoo, Finland
- Party: Social Democratic

Sinikka Marjatta Luja-Penttilä (9 June 1924 – 18 November 2022) was a Finnish politician and writer. She represented Uusimaa in the Parliament of Finland from 1966 to 1983 as a member of the Social Democratic Party, and was the minister of social affairs and health from 1979 to 1982.

== Biography ==
Luja-Penttilä was born on 9 June 1924 in Antrea, Finland, and moved to Leppävaara, Finland with her family a few months after she was born. Her father was a union leader and her mother was a play director and newspaper writer; both were active in the Social Democratic Party (SDP).

In 1945, Luja-Penttilä completed the national matriculation examination, and she later took courses at Holly Royde College in Manchester, England, in the 1960s. From 1945 to 1947, she worked as a copy editor for the commerce-oriented newspaper Kauppalehti, and from 1947 to 1966, she was an editor at the publishing company Tammi.

Luja-Penttilä became involved in politics starting in 1945 when she joined the local workers' association in Leppävaara. She was elected to the city council of Espoo in 1957 and was a city councillor for 25 years. Luja-Penttilä was the secretary of the women's branch of the SDP in Uusimaa, during a time when the party was divided over internal disagreements, and she was a supporter of Väinö Leskinen, one of the SDP's leaders. In 1966, she was elected to the Parliament of Finland to represent the constituency of Uusimaa. She was subsequently re-elected to Parliament four times, serving continuously until 1983. In Parliament, Luja-Penttilä worked on legislative reforms of the national childcare, health, and education systems in Finland, and chaired the Education and Culture parliamentary committee in 1978, becoming the first female SDP member of Parliament to chair a committee. She married Sulo Penttilä, a metalworker, in 1977.

In May 1979, Prime Minister Mauno Koivisto appointed Luja-Penttilä as the minister of social affairs and health in his second cabinet. She held the position until 1982 and worked on legislating improvements to the 1972 national healthcare law during her tenure. She also developed a proposal designed to reduce smoking in Finland by raising cigarette prices by five to 15 percent. Luja-Penttilä retired from Parliament in 1983. That same year, she published Venla, a novel about a mother and daughter that was based on her own mother. From 1987 to 1993, she was the chair of the Central Association of Finnish Pensioners, and President Koivisto awarded her the honorary title of social counselor (sosiaalineuvos) in 1988.

Luja-Penttilä died in Espoo on 18 November 2022, at the age of 98.

== See also ==
- List of Cabinet Ministers from Finland by ministerial portfolio
