= Jukka Gustafsson =

Finnish politician (born 1947)

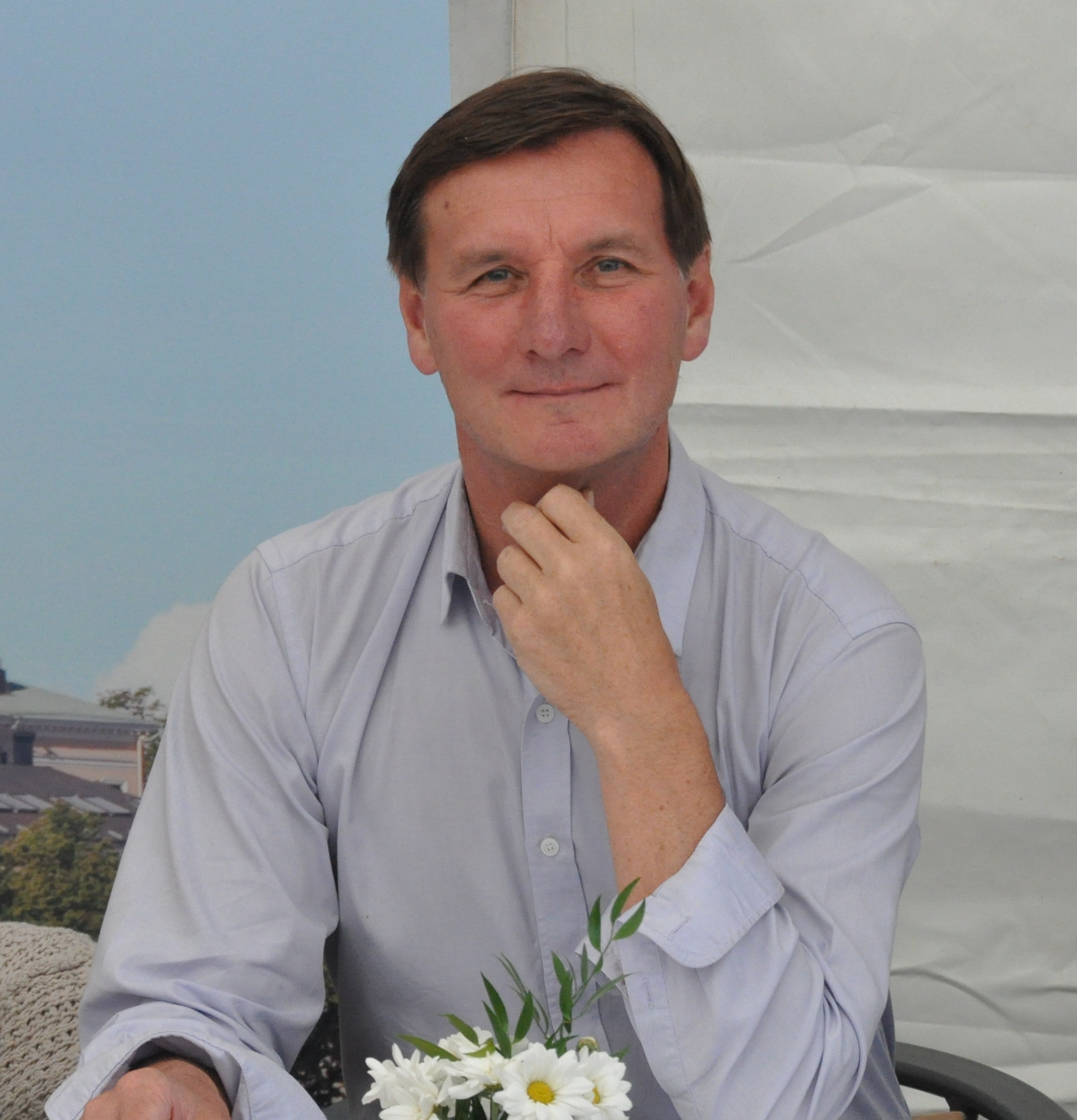

Member of the Parliament
- Incumbent
- Assumed office 21 March 1987
- Constituency: Pirkanmaa

Minister of Education
- In office 22 June 2011 – 23 May 2013
- Preceded by: Henna Virkkunen
- Succeeded by: Krista Kiuru

Personal details
- Born: 2 January 1947 (age 79) Turku, Southwest Finland, Finland
- Party: Social Democratic Party of Finland

Jukka Tapani Gustafsson (born 2 January 1947) is a Finnish politician. A Social Democrat, he has represented the electoral district of Pirkanmaa in the Parliament of Finland since 1987.

== Life ==
Gustafsson was born in Turku. He graduated as Master of Social Science in 1976. He served as principal of the Murikka Institute for ten years before being elected to the Parliament in 1987.

In the Parliament, Gustafsson chaired the Employment and Equality Committee from 2003 to 2007. Outside of politics, he served as vice president of the Football Association of Finland from 1991 to 2006. In June 2011, he was appointed Minister of Education to Jyrki Katainen's cabinet. He had to resign from the government in May 2013 when the Social Democratic Party replaced him with Krista Kiuru.

Gustafsson is currently a member of the Grand Committee and the Education and Culture Committee of the Parliament. In addition, he has been a member of the City Council of Tampere since 1976.
