= Katri-Helena Eskelinen =

Finnish politician (1925–2014)

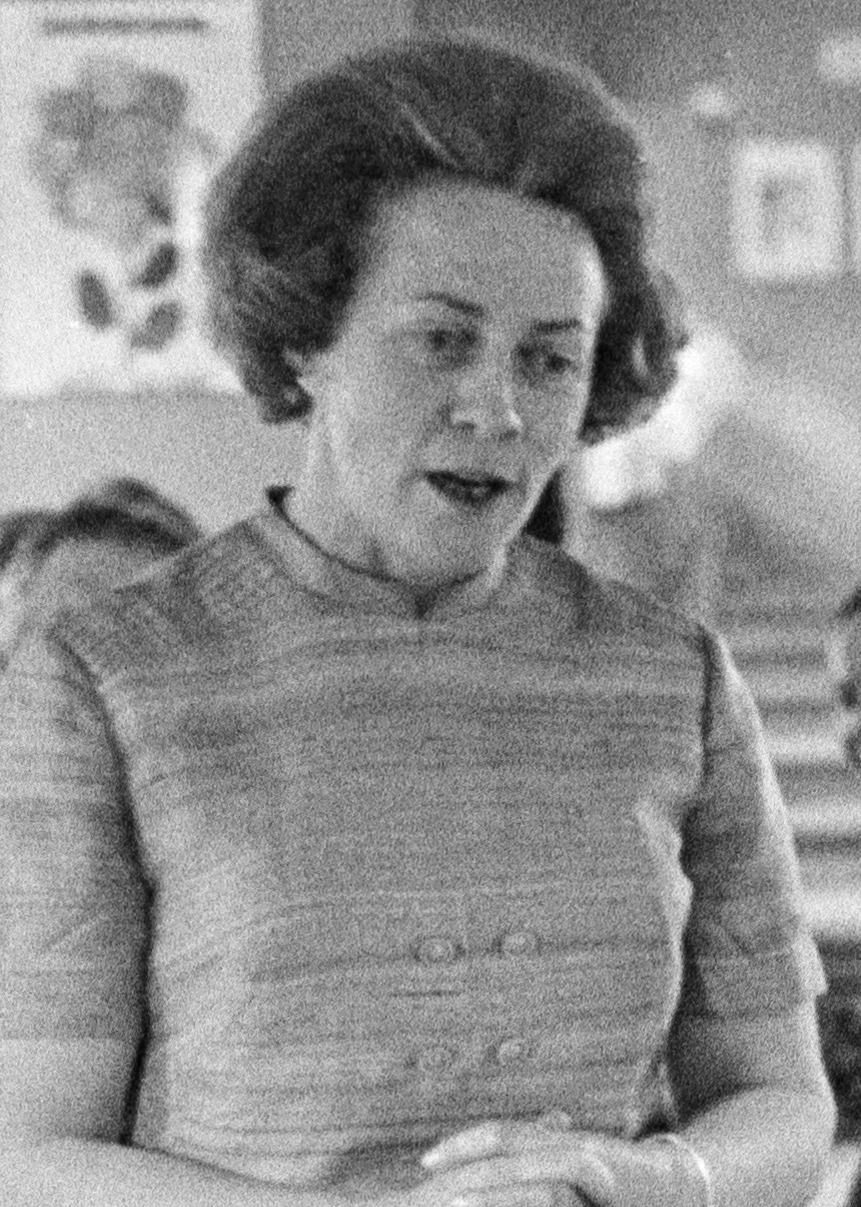
- Eskelinen in 1971

Member of the Parliament of Finland
- In office 5 April 1966 – 20 March 1987
- Constituency: Kuopio

Personal details
- Born: 8 April 1925; Siilinjärvi, Finland
- Died: 14 July 2014 (aged 89); Siilinjärvi, Finland
- Political party: Centre Party

Katri-Helena Eskelinen (8 April 1925 – 14 July 2014) was a Finnish politician. She represented Kuopio in the Parliament of Finland from 1966 to 1987 as a member of the Centre Party. She was also the second minister of social affairs and health in the governments of Prime Ministers Ahti Karjalainen and Mauno Koivisto.

== Education and early career ==
Eskelinen was born on 8 April 1925 in Siilinjärvi, Finland. Because her smallholder parents could not afford to send her to secondary school, she attended the folk high school in North Savo and graduated in 1946. Eskelinen worked as an instructor at the youth associations league in North Savo from 1947 to 1958, and at the Finnish Youth Association in North Karelia from 1959 to 1960.

== Political career ==
In 1961, Eskelinen became the executive director of the women's branch of the Agrarian League (renamed the Centre Party in 1965) in Kuopio. She was also a member of the municipal council of Siilinjärvi. In 1966, Eskelinen was elected to the Parliament of Finland to represent the constituency of Kuopio (now Northern Savonia) as a member of the Centre Party. She was re-elected to Parliament five times, serving continuously until 1987, and sat on several parliamentary committees, including Education and Culture, Finance, Legal Affairs, and Social Affairs and Health. From 1970 to 1972, she was the deputy chair of the Centre Party parliamentary group, and she was a presidential elector in the 1968, 1978, and 1982 elections.

Prime Minister Ahti Karjalainen appointed Eskelinen as second minister of social affairs and health in July 1970, and she remained in the position until October 1971. She was later reappointed to the same position in Prime Minister Mauno Koivisto's government from May 1979 to February 1982. As second minister, Eskelinen frequently focused on family policy issues. She strongly believed that parents should be able to be full-time caretakers for at least the first three years of their child's life, and advocated for a state-sponsored allowance for child care at home. She also helped establish the Finnish Pensioners' Federation, a national organisation for retired pensioners.

== Later life and death ==
After retiring from politics, Eskelinen continued to participate in local organisations in Siilinjärvi, including working to establish a local rehabilitation centre. President Koivisto awarded her the honorary title of regional councillor (kotiseutuneuvos) in 1988. In 2009, she was briefly hospitalized after she fell on a slippery road until she was found by a dog who alerted its owner.

Eskelinen died on 14 July 2014 in Siilinjärvi, at the age of 89. In 2015, Siilinjärvi's local newspaper Uutis-Jousi conducted a readers' poll on "the greatest Siilinjärvi resident of all time"; Eskelinen overwhelming received the most votes out of 77 nominated candidates.

== See also ==
- List of Cabinet Ministers from Finland by ministerial portfolio
