= Laura Räty =

Finnish physician, politician and business executive

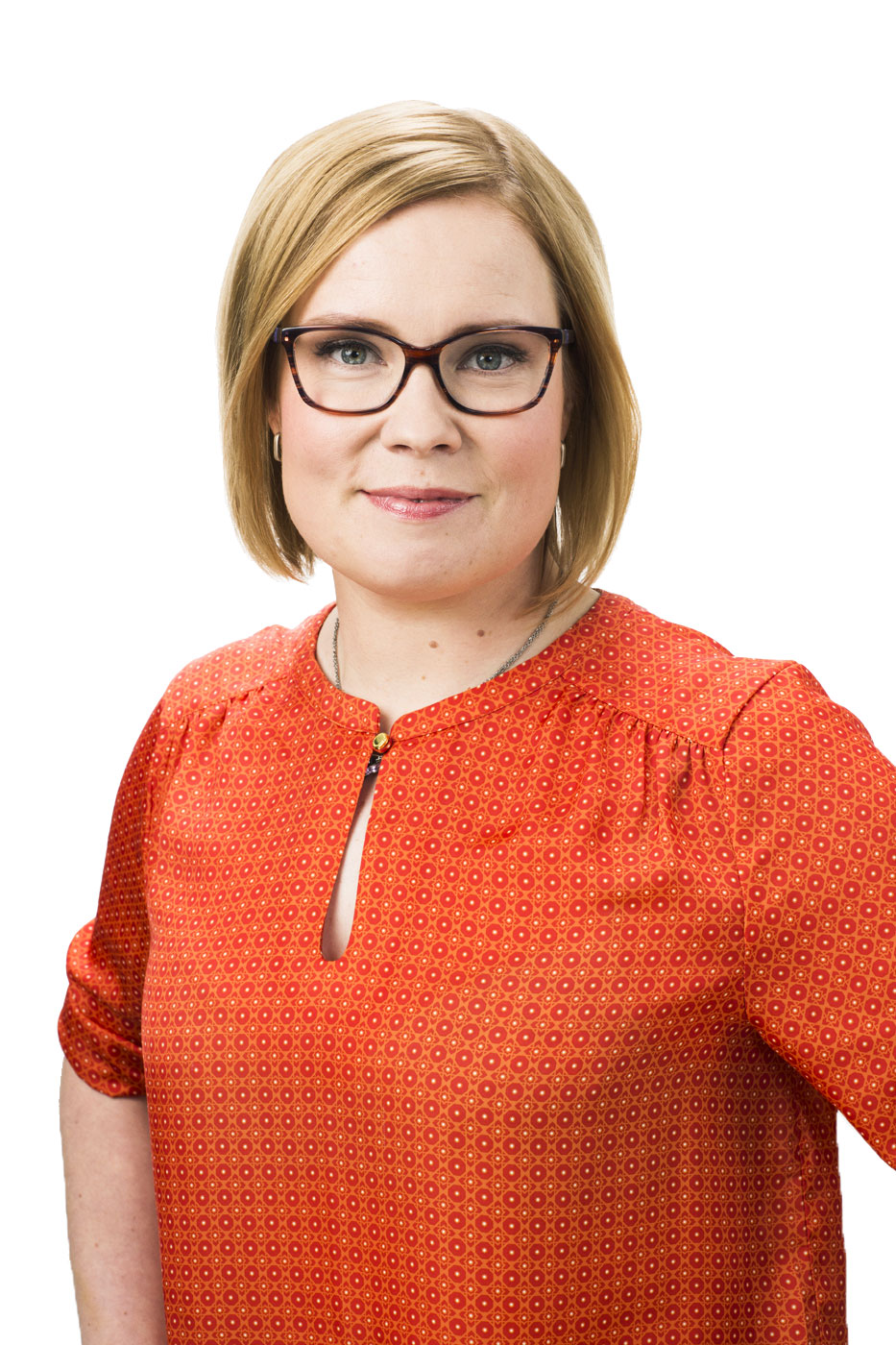

Minister of Social Affairs and Health
- In office 24 June 2014 – 29 May 2015
- Prime Minister: Alexander Stubb
- Preceded by: Paula Risikko
- Succeeded by: Hanna Mäntylä

Deputy Mayor of Helsinki for Social Services and Health Care
- In office 2011 – 2014, 2015 – 2016

Member of City Board of Helsinki
- In office 2009 – 2011

Member of City Council of Helsinki
- In office 2005 – 2011

Personal details
- Born: 14 September 1977 (age 48) Äänekoski, Finland
- Party: National Coalition Party
- Occupation: Business Director at Terveystalo Group

Laura Kaarina Räty (born 14 September 1977) is a Finnish politician, former Minister of Social Affairs and Health and a business director at the Finnish private hospital corporate group Terveystalo.

She has been criticized for tax planning and for possible conflict of interest when transferring from public office to health business.

== Career ==
Laura Räty worked as a physician and served in the Helsinki City Council from 2005 to 2011 and the Helsinki City Board from 2009 to 2011 representing the National Coalition Party before running for Parliament of Finland in the 2011 election. She failed to gain a seat, but was appointed as Deputy Mayor of Helsinki for Social Services and Health Care and served in the role from 2011 to 2014. In June 2014, Räty was appointed Minister of Social Affairs and Health in the cabinet of Alexander Stubb. She was set to replace resigning Lasse Männistö as Member of Parliament in 2014 until Männistö withdrew his resignation under criticism for violating the dignity of Parliament.

She ran for Parliament again in the 2015 election, but 4,087 votes were not enough to get her elected. She briefly returned to her Deputy Mayor post in May 2015 before resigning and joining the Finnish private hospital corporate group Terveystalo as a business director in 2016.

== Criticism ==
Laura Räty's questioning of Finnish wages garnered wide criticism in 2014. Räty claimed that only a very small number of parents in Finland earn under 2,600 euros per month while in actuality almost 500,000 Finn parents earned under 2,600 euros per month at the time. She later apologized for her comments.

Her financial matters were the subject of public discussion when it was discovered that she had utilized tax planning during her physician tenure 2007–2011. She had transformed some of her income into tax-free dividends during 2006–2009 and her holding company had received approximately 20,000 euros of tax-free dividends during 2007–2011. Otherwise over half of the sum would have been subject to taxation. Räty later commented that she would not repeat the arrangement in the future and had discontinued it after her selection as Deputy Mayor of Helsinki in 2011.

In 2016, Laura Räty was criticized for her decision to resign as Deputy Mayor of Helsinki for Social Services and Health Care and join the private hospital corporate group Terveystalo as a business director. Her move was seen by opposing politicians and the press as a conflict of interest due to possible use of insider information on public affairs concerning health reform. Similarly, her guidance for Terveystalo physicians to send patients to the physicians' own clinics with public health funding received criticism.

== See also ==
- Healthcare in Finland
- Politics of Finland
