= Annika Saarikko =

Finnish politician (born 1983)

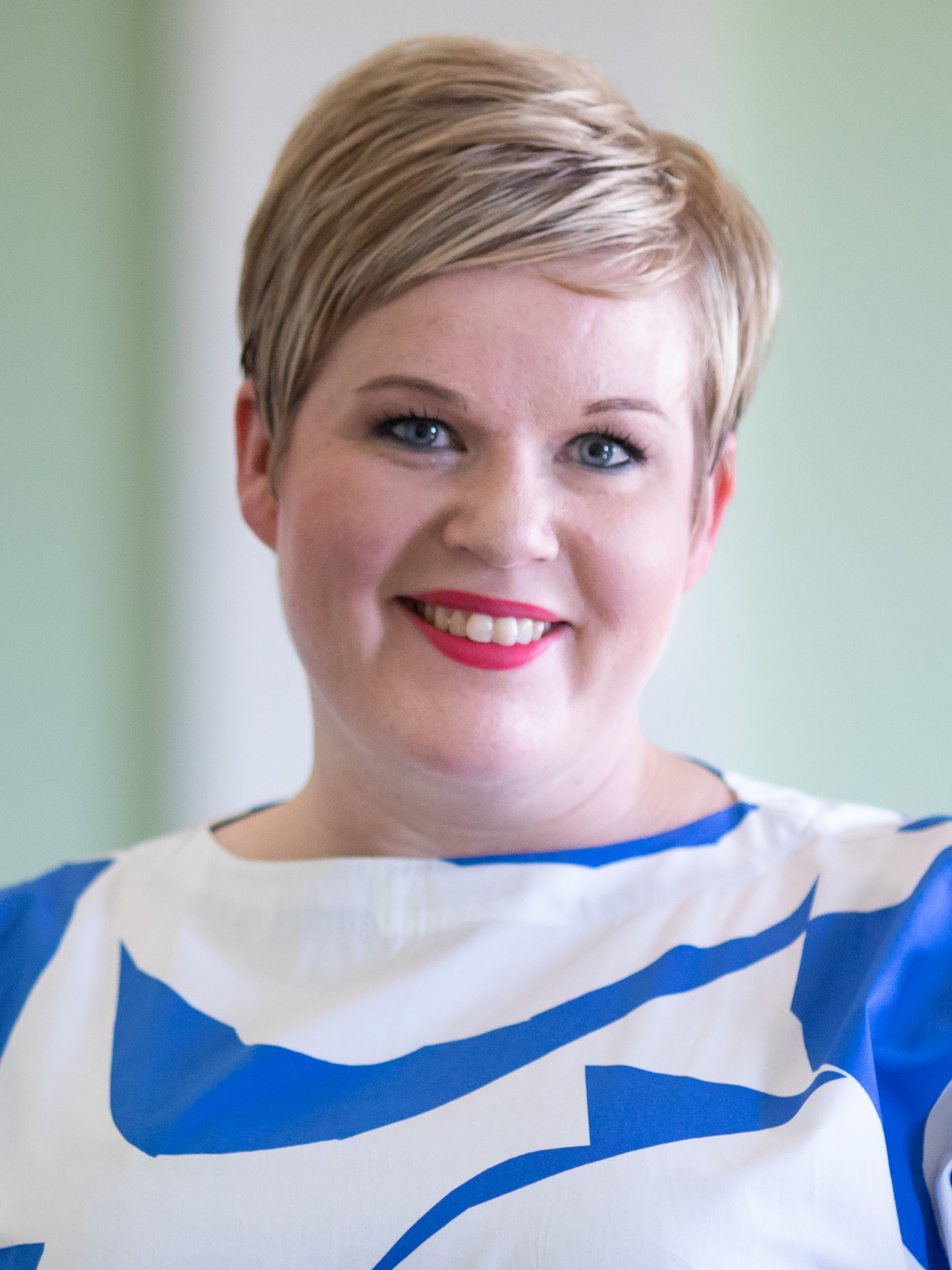
- Saarikko in 2021

36th Deputy Prime Minister of Finland
- In office 10 September 2020 – 20 June 2023
- Prime Minister: Sanna Marin
- Preceded by: Matti Vanhanen
- Succeeded by: Riikka Purra

Minister of Finance
- In office 27 May 2021 – 20 June 2023
- Prime Minister: Sanna Marin
- Preceded by: Matti Vanhanen
- Succeeded by: Riikka Purra

Minister of Science and Culture
- In office 6 August 2020 – 27 May 2021
- Prime Minister: Sanna Marin
- Preceded by: Hanna Kosonen
- Succeeded by: Antti Kurvinen
- In office 6 June 2019 – 9 August 2019
- Prime Minister: Antti Rinne
- Preceded by: Sampo Terho
- Succeeded by: Hanna Kosonen

Minister of Family Affairs and Social Services
- In office 10 July 2017 – 6 June 2019
- Prime Minister: Juha Sipilä
- Preceded by: Juha Rehula
- Succeeded by: Krista Kiuru

Leader of the Centre Party
- In office 5 September 2020 – 15 June 2024
- Preceded by: Katri Kulmuni
- Succeeded by: Antti Kaikkonen

Member of Finnish Parliament for Finland Proper
- Incumbent
- Assumed office 20 April 2011

Personal details
- Born: Annika Virpi Irene Saarikko; 10 November 1983 (age 42) Oripää, Finland
- Party: Centre
- Spouse: Erkki Papunen (m. 2014)
- Education: University of Turku

Annika Virpi Irene Saarikko (born 10 November 1983) is a Finnish politician and minister who served as the Deputy Prime Minister of Finland from 2020 to 2023. She served as the leader of the Finnish Centre Party from 2020 to 2024.

== Early life and education ==
Saarikko was born in Oripää, Finland. She has a bachelor's degree in educational science and a master's degree in philosophy (majoring in media studies) from the University of Turku.

== Political career ==
On 14 June 2010, Saarikko was elected to the vice chair of the Centre Party. She was elected to the Parliament of Finland in 2011 Finnish parliamentary election.

From 10 July 2017 to 6 June 2019 Saarikko served as the minister of family affairs and social services. On 6 June 2019, she was appointed minister of science and culture. Saarikko took maternity leave on 9 August 2019, and the position was filled by Hanna Kosonen until Saarikko reassumed her post in August 2020. She became Deputy Prime Minister of Finland, traditionally held by the leader of the second largest party in the government coalition, in September 2020. In May 2021 Saarikko became Minister of Finance.

Saarikko led the Centre Party to the 2023 Finnish parliamentary election, in which the party lost 8 seats and finished fourth. Due to the election defeat, Saarikko announced that the party would not seek a place in the government. In February 2024, Saarikko announced that she will not seek another term as leader at the party conference in June 2024. Due to becoming the head of the organisation of student health, she will be relieved of her duty as a member of the parliament of Finland from september 2025 onwards.

== Personal life ==
Saarikko has two children and is expecting a third in July 2024.

== Other activities ==
=== European Union organizations ===
- European Investment Bank (EIB), Ex-Officio Member of the Board of Governors (since 2021)
- European Stability Mechanism (ESM), Member of the Board of Governors (since 2021)

=== International organizations ===
- Asian Infrastructure Investment Bank (AIIB), Ex-Officio Member of the Board of Governors (since 2021)
- European Bank for Reconstruction and Development (EBRD), Ex-Officio Member of the Board of Governors (since 2021)
- Nordic Investment Bank (NIB), Ex-Officio Member of the Board of Governors (since 2021)
- World Bank, Ex-Officio Member of the Board of Governors (since 2021)

Political offices
Preceded by Matti Vanhanen	Minister of Finance; 2021–2023	Succeeded by Riikka Purra
