= Ministry of Social Affairs and Health =

Government ministry of Finland

Ministry of Social Affairs and Health Sosiaali- ja terveysministeriö Social- och hälsovårdsministeriet
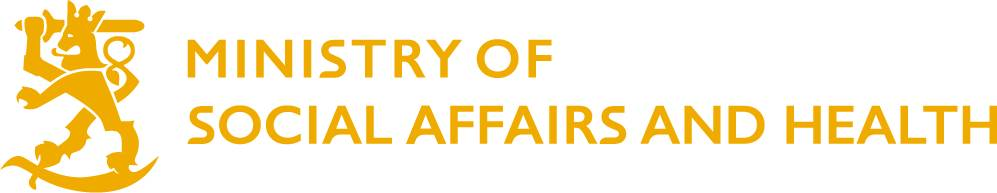

Ministry overview
- Jurisdiction: Finnish Government
- Headquarters: Meritullinkatu 8, Helsinki
- Annual budget: €11.5 billion
- Ministers responsible: Wille Rydman, Minister of Social Affairs and Health; Sanni Grahn-Laasonen, Minister of Social Security

The Ministry of Social Affairs and Health (Finnish: Sosiaali- ja terveysministeriö, Swedish: Social- och hälsovårdsministeriet) is a Finnish government ministry tasked with the planning and implementation of policies regarding the social affairs and health of the inhabitants of Finland. The ministry includes two ministers: the Minister of Social Affairs and Health and the Minister of Family Affairs and Social Services.

The ministry has five departments: the Administration and Planning Department, the Department for Promotion of Welfare and Health, the Department for Social and Health Services, the Department for Occupational Safety and the Health and Insurance Department.

The ministry's predecessor was founded prior to Finland's declaration of independence. In the beginning, it focused on countering misery, promoting sobriety, and caring for the poor, vagrants, children and alcoholics. Healthcare was introduced to its tasks in 1968.

A major reform of the health and social service system (sosiaali- ja terveyspalveluiden uudistus, or sote-uudistus for short) has been in the works since 2011. The reform is set to be the largest change to Finland's social and healthcare systems in the country's history. The reform has been connected to the renewal of regional administration structure (maakuntauudistus).
