= Sari Sarkomaa =

Finnish politician (born 1965)

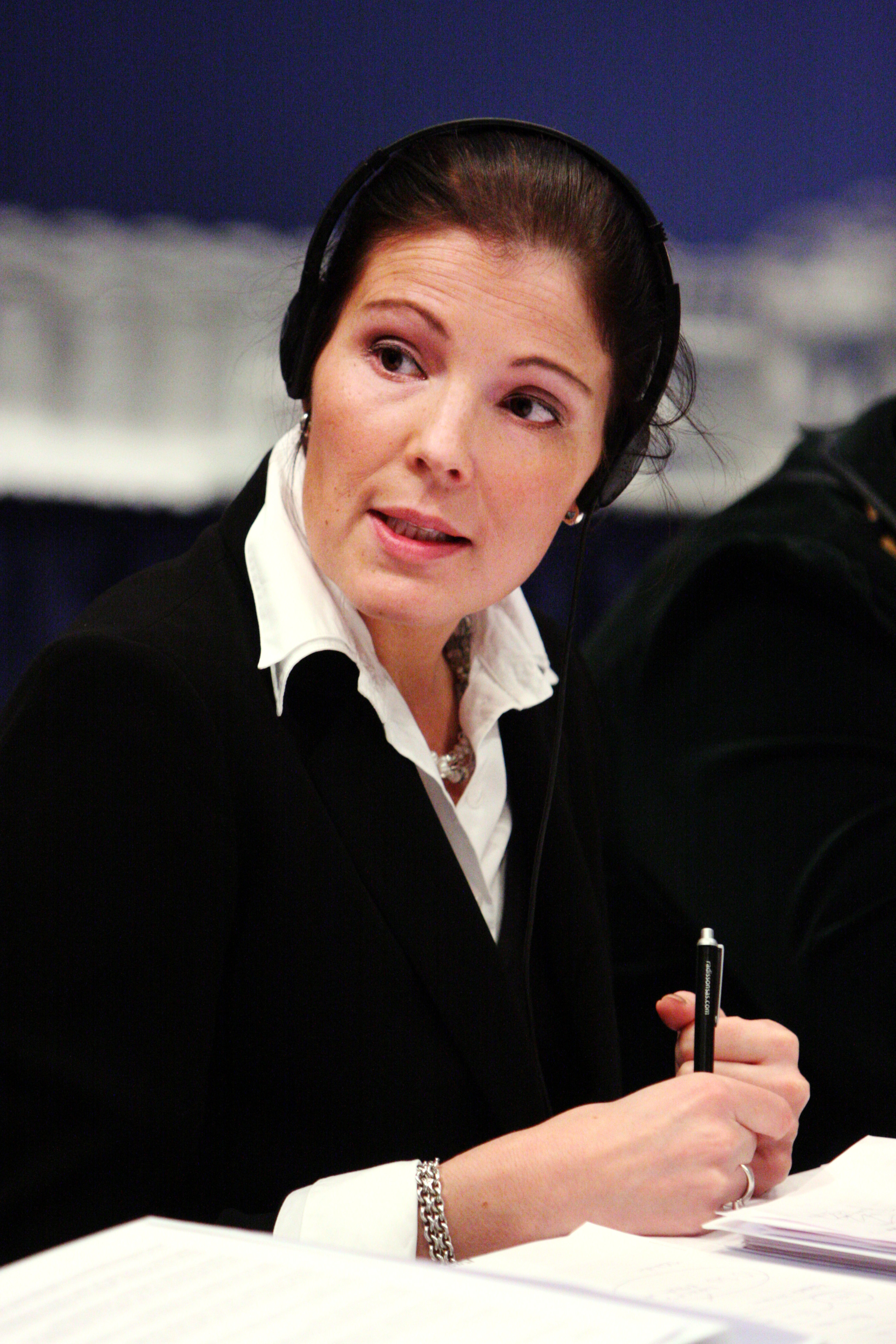
- Sari Sarkomaa in 2007.

Minister of Education
- In office 19 April 2007 – 19 December 2008
- Prime Minister: Matti Vanhanen
- Preceded by: Antti Kalliomäki
- Succeeded by: Henna Virkkunen

Personal details
- Born: 24 September 1965 (age 60) Tampere, Pirkanmaa, Finland
- Party: National Coalition Party
- Spouse: Kim Ruokonen

Sari Sarkomaa (born 24 September 1965 in Tampere, Finland) is a Finnish politician and former Minister of Education. She served in Matti Vanhanen's second cabinet between 19 April 2007 and 19 December 2008. Sarkomaa quit her ministerial post to spend more time with her family. She was succeeded by Henna Virkkunen.
