= Sanni Grahn-Laasonen =

Finnish politician (born 1983)

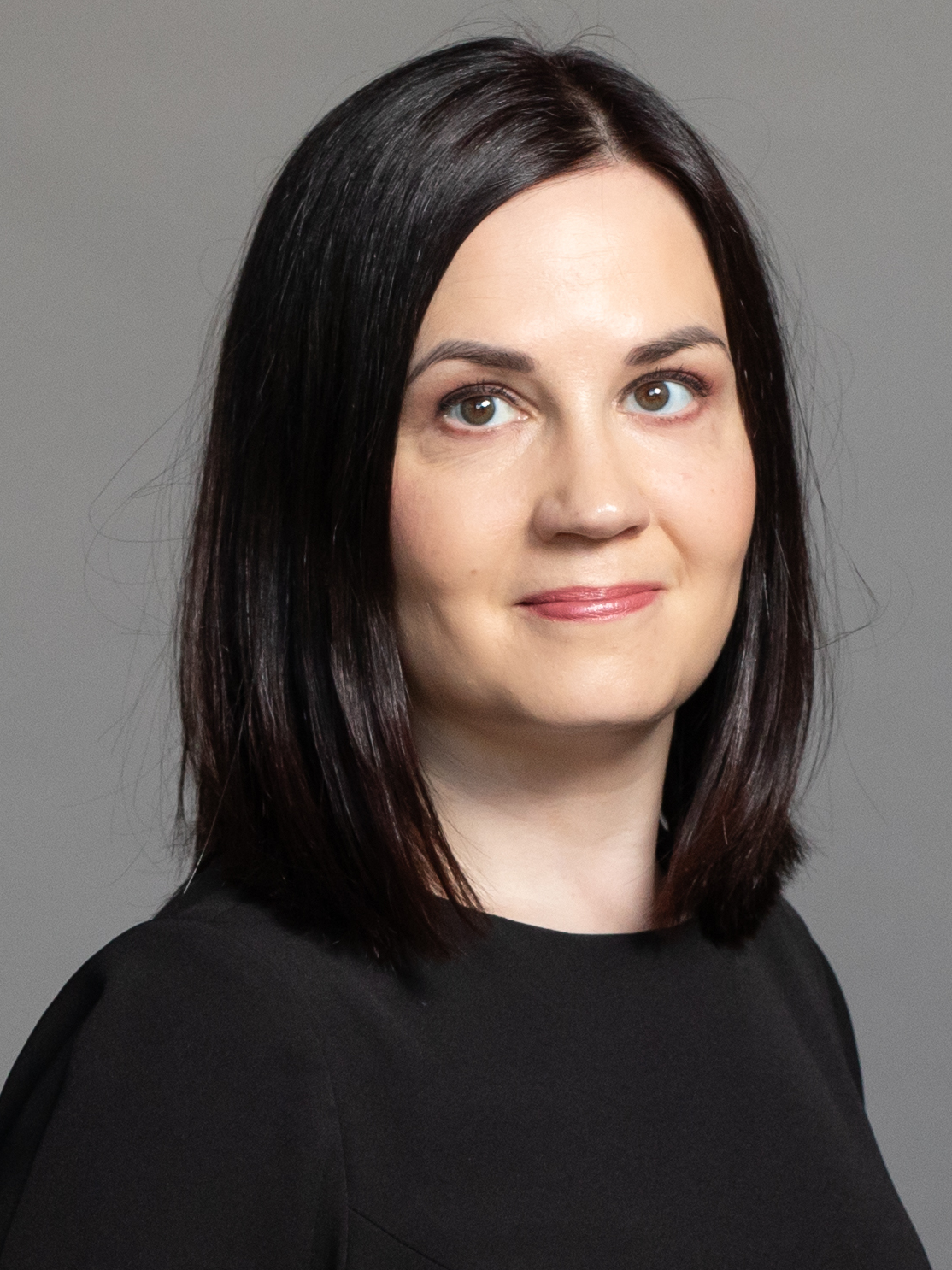
- Grahn-Laasonen in 2023

Minister of Social Security
- In office 20 June 2023 – 16 June 2026
- Prime Minister: Petteri Orpo
- Preceded by: Krista Kiuru
- Succeeded by: Karoliina Partanen

Minister of Education and Science
- In office 5 May 2017 – 6 June 2019
- Prime Minister: Juha Sipilä
- Preceded by: Herself (education and culture)
- Succeeded by: Li Andersson (education); Annika Saarikko (science)

Minister of Education and Culture
- In office 29 May 2015 – 5 May 2017
- Prime Minister: Juha Sipilä
- Preceded by: Krista Kiuru (education); Pia Viitanen (culture)
- Succeeded by: Herself (education); Sampo Terho (culture)

Minister of the Environment
- In office 26 September 2014 – 29 May 2015
- Prime Minister: Alexander Stubb
- Preceded by: Ville Niinistö
- Succeeded by: Kimmo Tiilikainen

Member of the Parliament of Finland
- Incumbent
- Assumed office 20 April 2011

Personal details
- Born: 4 May 1983 (age 43) Forssa, Kanta-Häme, Finland
- Party: National Coalition Party

Sanni Grahn-Laasonen (born 4 May 1983) is a Finnish politician and a member of the National Coalition Party. She was the Minister of Education and Culture 2015-2019. She was the Minister of the Environment in Alexander Stubb's cabinet between 2014 and 2015. Before her career in politics she has worked as a journalist in the Finnish afternoon newspaper Iltalehti.

In June 2023, she was appointed Minister of Social Security in the Orpo Cabinet.

== Electoral history ==
=== Parliamentary elections ===
Year	Constituency	Votes	Percentage	Result
2011	Häme	5,866	2.89%	Elected
2015	Häme	7,556	3.73%	Re-elected
2019	Häme	7,419	3.61%	Re-elected
2023	Häme	7,003	3.38%	Re-elected
