= Henna Virkkunen =

Finnish politician (born 1972)

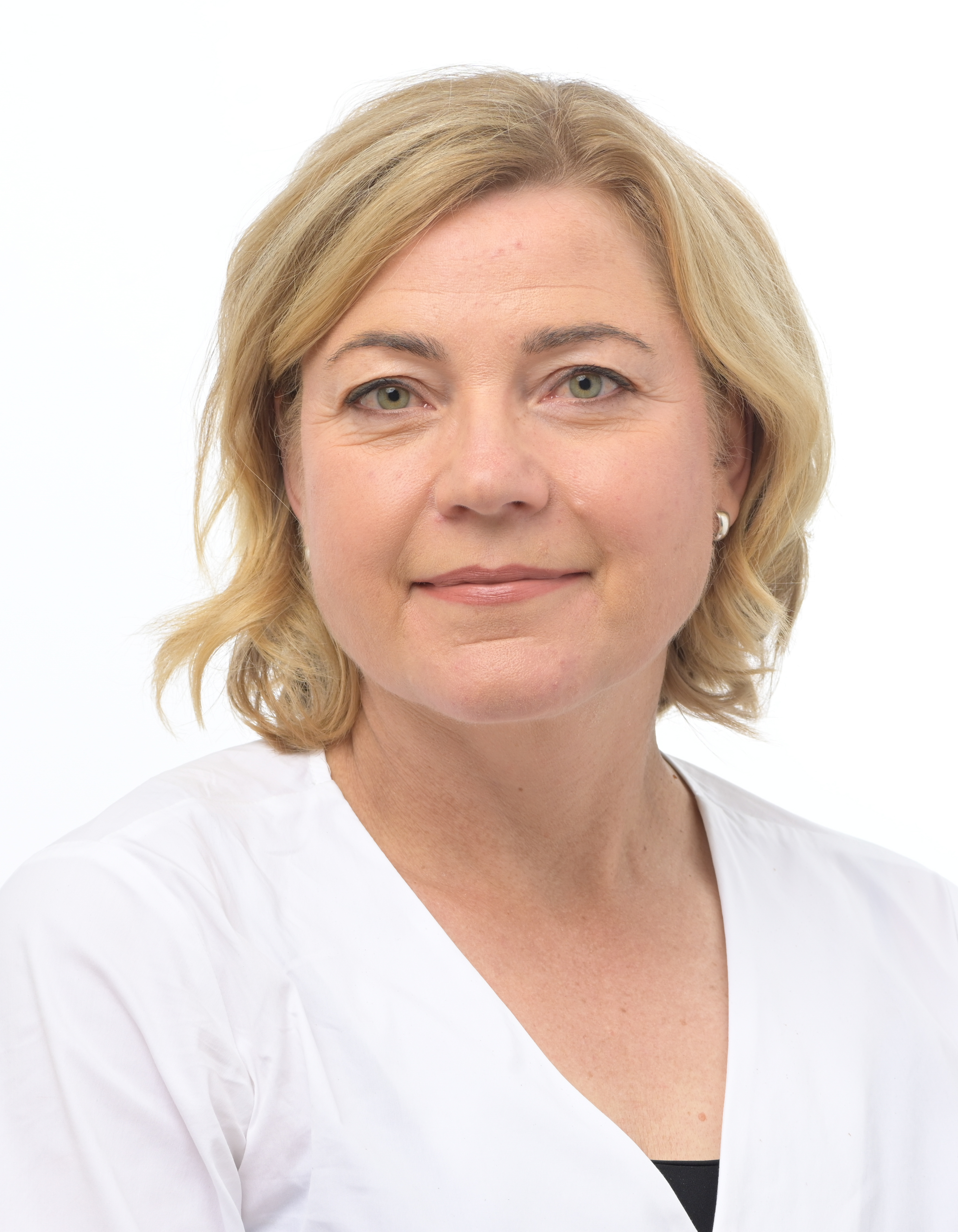
- Official portrait, 2024

Vice-President of the European Commission and European Commissioner for Digital and Frontier Technologies
- Incumbent
- Assumed office 1 December 2024
- Commission: Von der Leyen II
- Preceded by: Margrethe Vestager

Member of the European Parliament for Finland
- In office 1 July 2014 – 30 November 2024
- Succeeded by: Sirpa Pietikäinen

Minister of Transport
- In office 4 April 2014 – 24 June 2014
- Prime Minister: Jyrki Katainen
- Preceded by: Merja Kyllönen
- Succeeded by: Paula Risikko

Minister of Public Administration and Local Government
- In office 22 June 2011 – 24 June 2014
- Prime Minister: Jyrki Katainen
- Preceded by: Tapani Tölli
- Succeeded by: Paula Risikko (Transport and Local Government)

Minister of Education
- In office 19 December 2008 – 22 June 2011
- Prime Minister: Matti Vanhanen; Mari Kiviniemi
- Preceded by: Sari Sarkomaa
- Succeeded by: Jukka Gustafsson

Member of the Finnish Parliament
- In office 21 March 2007 – 1 July 2014
- Constituency: Helsinki

Member of the Jyväskylä City Council
- In office 20 October 1996 – 9 April 2016

Personal details
- Born: Henna Maria Virkkunen; 4 June 1972 (age 54) Joutsa, Finland
- Party: National Coalition
- Spouse: Matti Mäkinen
- Children: 1
- Education: University of Jyväskylä
- Website: www.hennavirkkunen.fi

Henna Maria Virkkunen (Note: Finnish pronunciation: [ˈhenːɑ ˈmɑriɑ ˈʋirkːunen]) (born 4 June 1972) is a Finnish politician who serves as Executive Vice-President of the European Commission for Technological Sovereignty, Security and Democracy, and European Commissioner for Digital and Frontier Technologies in the von der Leyen II Commission since December 2024.

A member of the center-right National Coalition Party, part of the European People's Party, she was a Member of the European Parliament (MEP) from 2014 to 2024. From 2007 to 2014 she sat in the Parliament of Finland, during which she held several ministerial portfolios across three successive cabinets, including Minister of Education, Minister of Public Administration and Local Government, and later Minister of Transport and Local Government.

In 2026, the Time magazine selected Virkkunen as the only Finn to be listed as one of the 100 most influential people in the world.

== Early life ==
Virkkunen was born on 4 June 1972 in Joutsa, Central Finland, as the eldest of five children. She grew up in Alavus, Southern Ostrobothnia, where her parents owned a restaurant and two bars. Early in life, she worked as a groom in Huittinen, and in Denmark with national-level horses. She studied at the University of Jyväskylä, earning a Master of Philosophy degree in 1999, specialising in journalism and communication, and later a Licentiate in Philosophy majoring in communication in 2007. During her studies she worked as a freelance journalist for Keskisuomalainen.

After university, she worked as a communications planner and partner at Medita Communication until 2002, and a research fellow at the University of Jyväskylä from 2003 to 2006.

Before entering national politics, Virkkunen was active in local government. She was elected to the Jyväskylä City Council in 1996, where she served until 2016, and held several positions within the National Coalition Party’s youth and regional organisations.

== Political career ==
=== Parliament of Finland ===
Virkkunen was first elected to the Parliament of Finland in the 2007 parliamentary election for the Central Finland electoral district. She secured the fourth-highest number of votes in her district, surpassing an incumbent from her party.

During her first term in Parliament, Virkkunen was appointed Minister of Education, serving from 19 December 2008 to 22 June 2011 in Prime Minister Matti Vanhanen's II cabinet. She continued in the role in Prime Minister Mari Kiviniemi's cabinet. On 22 June 2011, she transitioned to the Minister of Public Administration and Local Government in Prime Minister Jyrki Katainen's cabinet. Her portfolio later expanded to include transport, making her the Minister of Transport and Local Government until 24 June 2014, when she was elected to the European Parliament.

Before her ministerial appointments, Virkkunen served as a member of the Education and Culture Committee and the Environment Committee in the Parliament.

=== European Parliament ===
In parliament, Virkkunen has been serving on the European Parliament Committee on Industry, Research and Energy (since 2014) and the European Parliament Committee on Transport and Tourism (since 2021). In 2022, she joined the European Parliament Committee of Inquiry to investigate the use of Pegasus and equivalent surveillance spyware.

Virkkunen was the rapporteur on the non-binding opinion on integrated digital platforms and on driving and rest times.

In addition to her committee assignments, Virkkunen has been a member of the parliament's Delegation for relations with South Africa (2014–2019) and with the Arabian Peninsula (since 2019). She is also a member of the European Internet Forum; the European Parliament Intergroup on LGBT Rights; the European Parliament Intergroup on the Welfare and Conservation of Animals; and the European Parliament Intergroup on Seas, Rivers, Islands and Coastal Areas.

In December 2020, Virkkunen received the Energy Award at The Parliament Magazine's annual MEP Awards.

=== European Commission ===
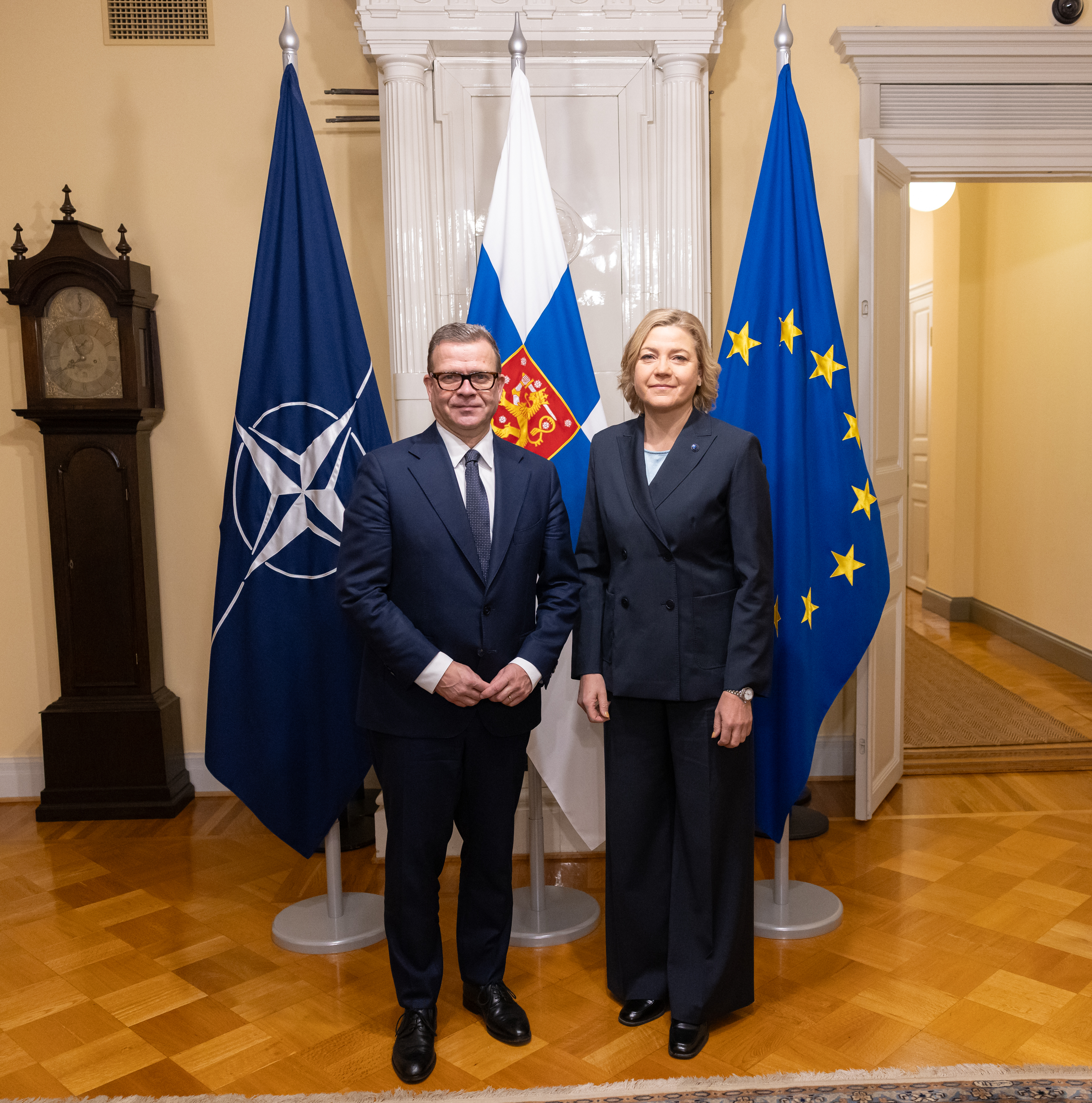
Virkkunen with Finnish Prime Minister Petteri Orpo in Helsinki, 7 November 2025

Following the 2024 European elections, the Finnish government nominated Virkkunen as the country’s European Commissioner serving under President Ursula von der Leyen. On 17 September 2024, President Ursula von der Leyen presented the list of Commissioners-designate and their portfolios, according to which Virkkunen will be the Executive Vice President for Tech Sovereignty, Security and Democracy for the European Commission from 2024 to 2029.

== Personal life ==
Virkkunen is married to Matti Mäkinen, a Finnish municipal manager, and together they have one son.

Political offices
Preceded by Sari Sarkomaa	Minister of Education; 2008–2011	Succeeded by Jukka Gustafsson
Preceded by Tapani Tölli	Minister of Public Administration and Local Government; 2011–2014	Succeeded by Paula Risikko as Minister of Transport and Local Government
Preceded by Merja Kyllönen	Minister of Transport; 2014	Succeeded by Paula Risikko as Minister of Transport and Local Government
