= Krista Kiuru =

Finnish politician

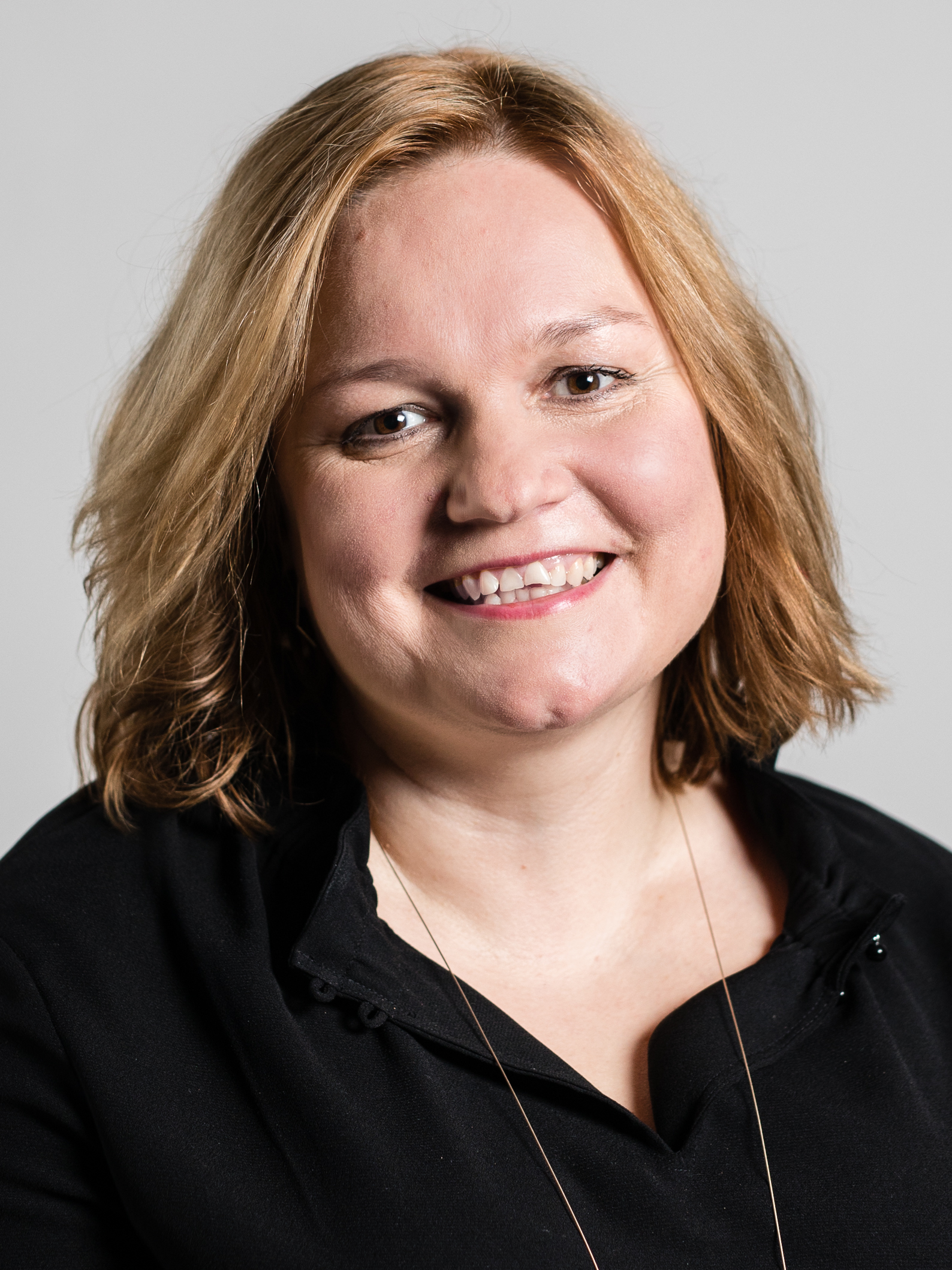
- Kiuru in 2019

Minister of Family Affairs and Social Services
- In office 6 October 2022 – 20 June 2023
- Prime Minister: Sanna Marin
- Preceded by: Aki Lindén
- Succeeded by: Sanni Grahn-Laasonen
- In office 6 June 2019 – 4 February 2022
- Prime Minister: Antti Rinne; Sanna Marin
- Preceded by: Annika Saarikko
- Succeeded by: Aki Lindén

Minister of Education and Communications
- In office 4 April 2014 – 29 May 2015
- Prime Minister: Jyrki Katainen; Alexander Stubb
- Preceded by: Herself (education); Pia Viitanen (communications)
- Succeeded by: Sanni Grahn-Laasonen; Anne Berner

Minister of Education
- In office 24 May 2013 – 4 April 2014
- Prime Minister: Jyrki Katainen
- Preceded by: Jukka Gustafsson
- Succeeded by: Herself (education and communications)

Minister of Housing and Communications
- In office 22 June 2011 – 24 May 2013
- Prime Minister: Jyrki Katainen
- Preceded by: Jan Vapaavuori (housing); Suvi Lindén (communications)
- Succeeded by: Pia Viitanen

Member of the Parliament of Finland
- Incumbent
- Assumed office 21 March 2007

Personal details
- Born: 5 August 1974 (age 51) Pori, Satakunta, Finland
- Party: Social Democratic

Krista Katriina Kiuru (born 5 August 1974) is a Finnish politician. She served as Minister of Housing and Communications and Minister of Education and Communications in Jyrki Katainen's and Alexander Stubb's cabinets. From 2019 to 2023, she served as the Minister of Family Affairs and Social Services in the Rinne Cabinet and the subsequent Marin Cabinet.

On 13 December 2024, in the afternoon, Kiuru was attacked in Kaisaniemi Park when an unknown man hit her in the face. Initially, it was speculated that the assault might have been politically motivated, as Kiuru was involved with contentious discussions about a hospital network reform. The police quickly apprehended a suspect, and early reports from the police indicated that the attack had been random.
