= Susanna Huovinen =

Finnish politician (born 1972)

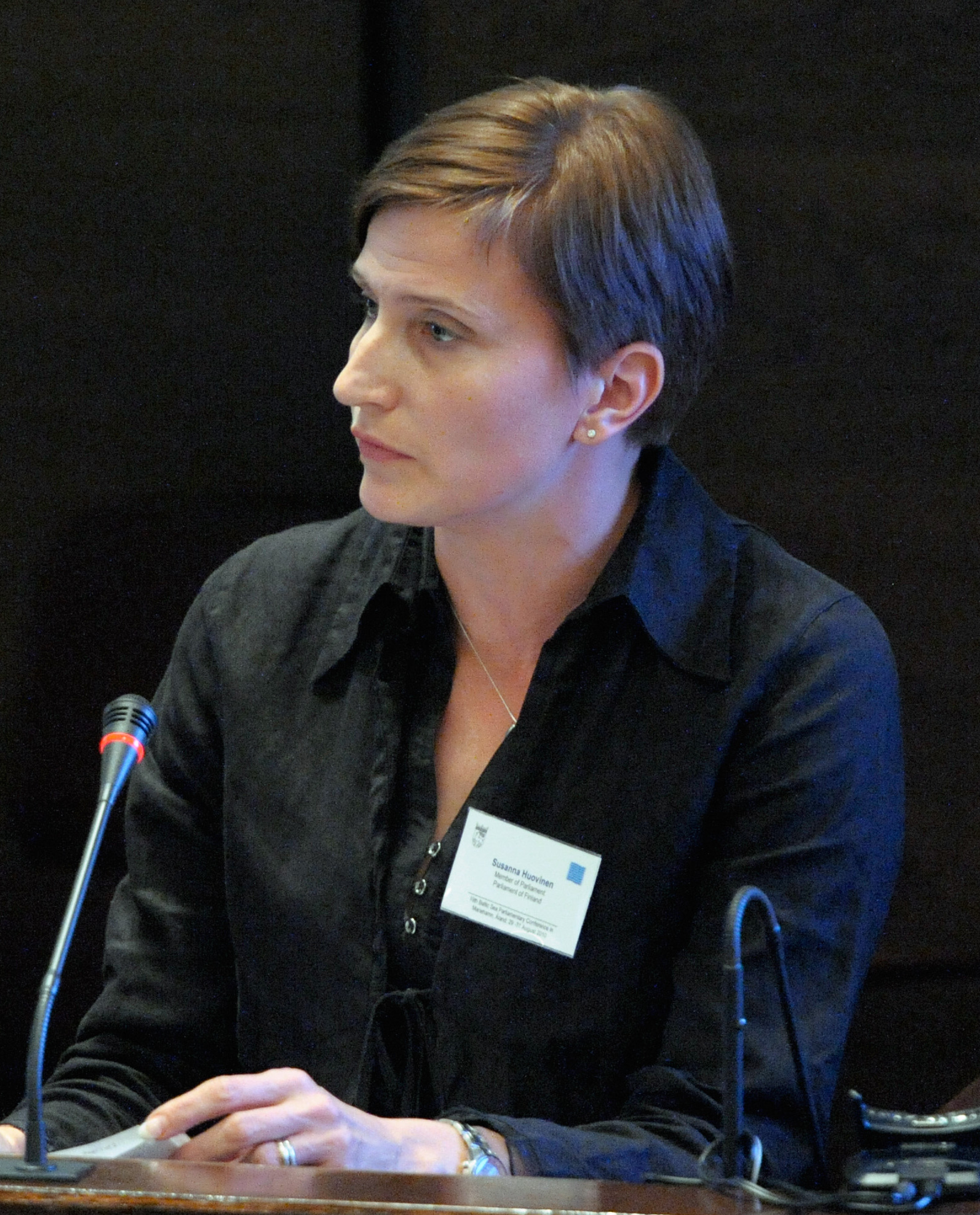
- Huovinen in 2011

Minister of Social Services
- In office 24 May 2013 – 29 May 2015
- Prime Minister: Jyrki Katainen; Alexander Stubb
- Preceded by: Maria Guzenina-Richardson
- Succeeded by: Juha Rehula

Minister of Transport and Communications
- In office 24 September 2005 – 18 April 2007
- Prime Minister: Matti Vanhanen
- Preceded by: Leena Luhtanen
- Succeeded by: Anu Vehviläinen (transport); Suvi Lindén (communications)

Personal details
- Born: 10 June 1972 (age 54) Liminka, Finland
- Party: Social Democratic Party
- Spouse: Timo Koivisto
- Education: University of Jyväskylä
- Website: susannahuovinen.fi

Krista Anri Susanna Huovinen (born 10 June 1972) is a Finnish politician of the Social Democratic Party and the Minister of Social Services between 2013 and 2015.

Huovinen was born in Liminka, and was elected to the Finnish Parliament in 1999 from Central Finland. She was deputy chairman of the Social Democratic parliamentary group from 2003 to 2005, when she was elected to the cabinet. She held the post of Minister of Transport and Communications from 24 September 2005 to 18 April 2007.

In addition to her role in parliament, Huovinen has been serving as member of the Finnish delegation to the Parliamentary Assembly of the Council of Europe since 2011. As member of the Socialist Group, she is currently a member of the Committee on Rules of Procedure, Immunities and Institutional Affairs; the Sub-Committee on Integration; and the Sub-Committee on Refugee and Migrant Children and Young People.

| Preceded by Leena Luhtanen | Minister of Transport and Communications; 2005-2007 | Succeeded by Anu Vehviläinen |
