= Pia Viitanen =

Finnish politician (born 1967)

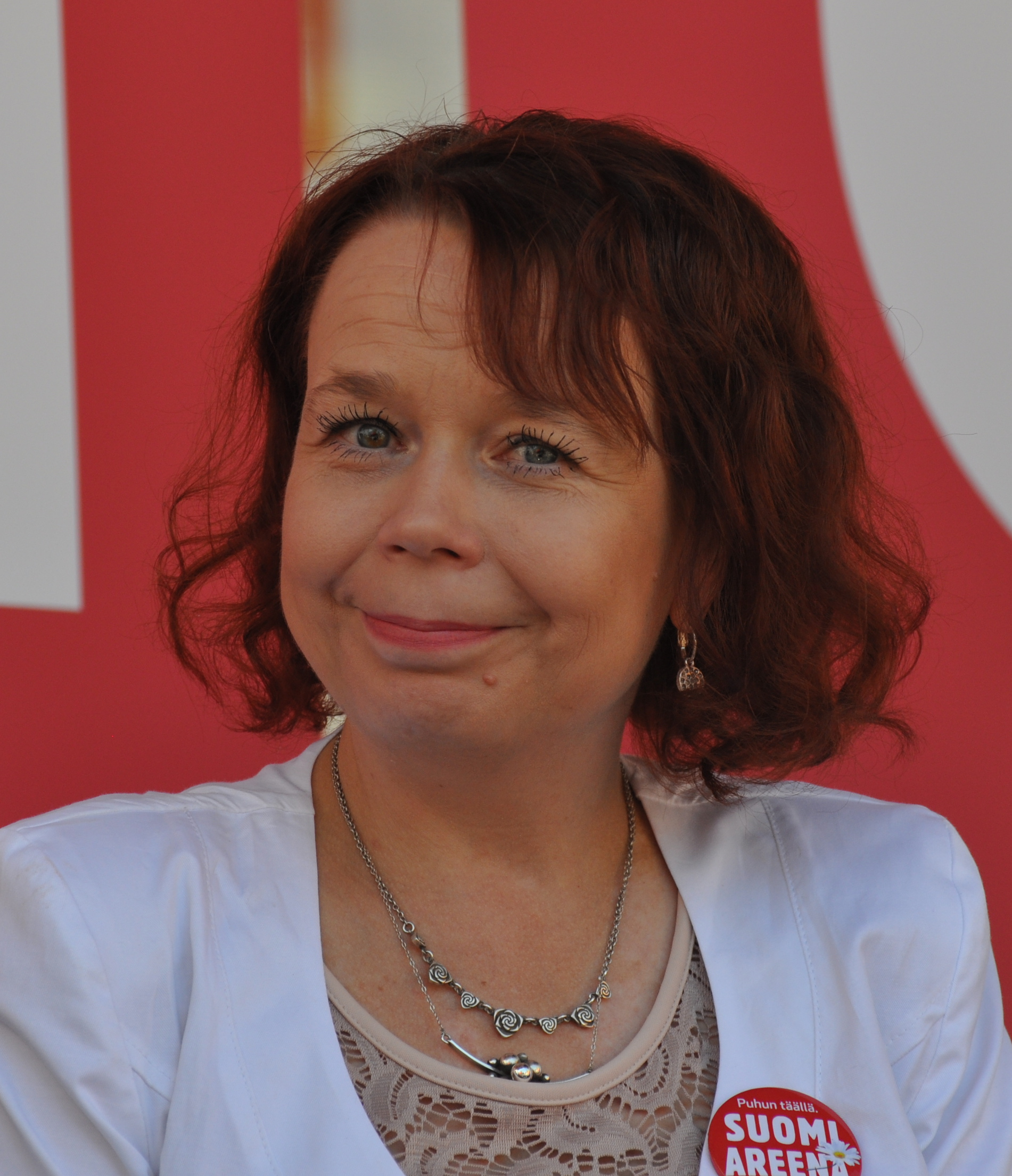

Minister of Culture and Housing
- In office 4 April 2014 – 29 May 2015
- Prime Minister: Jyrki Katainen; Alexander Stubb
- Preceded by: Pia Viitanen (housing); Paavo Arhinmäki (culture)
- Succeeded by: Sanni Grahn-Laasonen

Minister of Housing and Communications
- In office 24 May 2013 – 4 April 2014
- Prime Minister: Jyrki Katainen
- Preceded by: Krista Kiuru
- Succeeded by: Pia Viitanen (housing); Krista Kiuru (communications)

Personal details
- Born: 7 April 1967 (age 59) Tampere, Pirkanmaa, Finland
- Party: Social Democratic

Pia Viitanen (born 7 April 1967 in Tampere) is a Finnish politician and a member of the Social Democratic Party. She was the Minister of Culture and Housing in Alexander Stubb's cabinet.
