= Paula Risikko =

Finnish politician (born 1960)

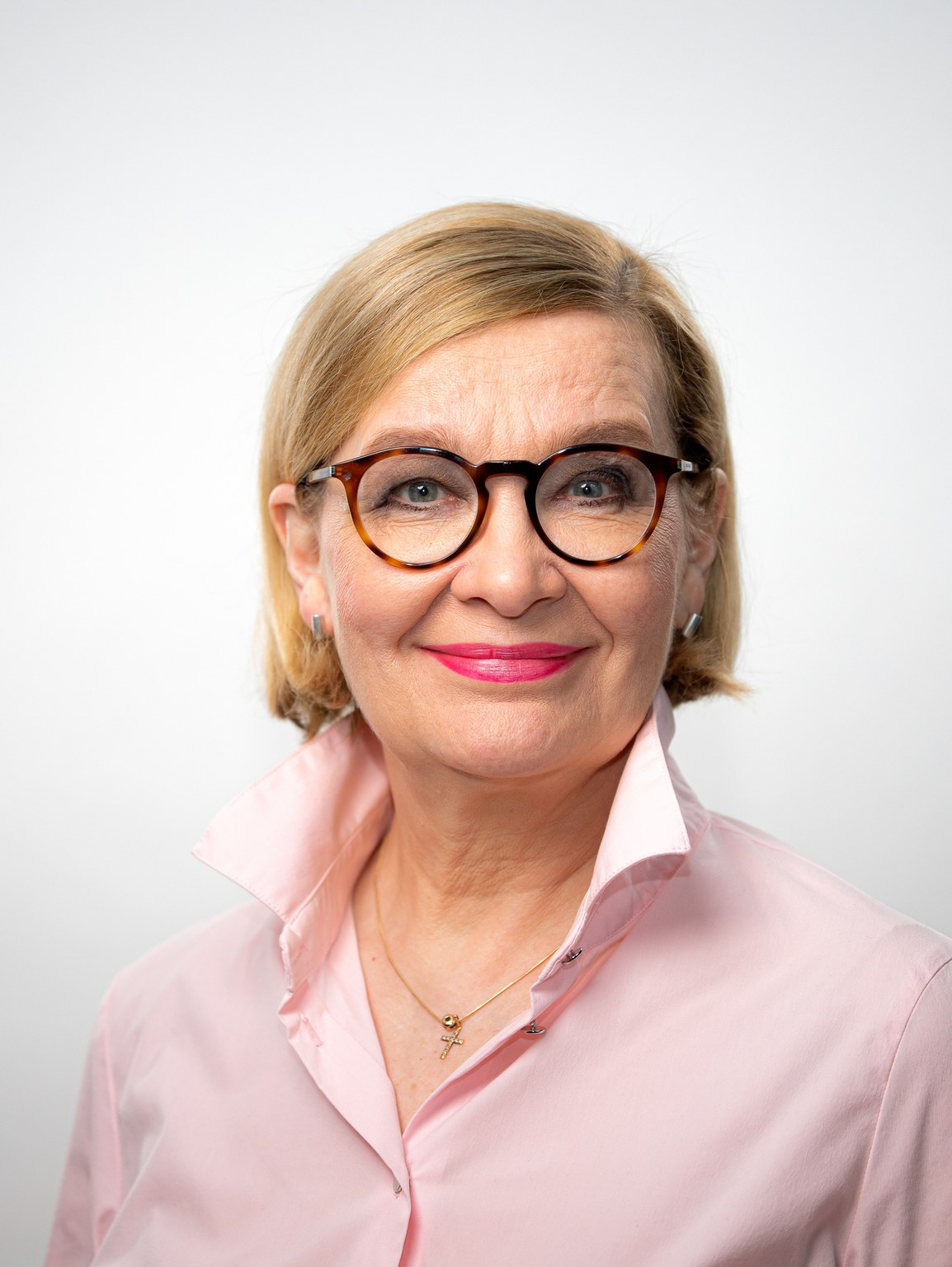

First Deputy Speaker of the Parliament of Finland
- Incumbent
- Assumed office 21 June 2023
- Preceded by: Juho Eerola

Speaker of the Parliament of Finland
- In office 5 February 2018 – 16 April 2019
- Preceded by: Maria Lohela
- Succeeded by: Antti Rinne

Minister of the Interior
- In office 22 June 2016 – 5 February 2018
- Prime Minister: Juha Sipilä
- Preceded by: Petteri Orpo
- Succeeded by: Kai Mykkänen

Minister of Transport and Local Government
- In office 24 June 2014 – 29 May 2015
- Prime Minister: Alexander Stubb
- Preceded by: Henna Virkkunen
- Succeeded by: Anu Vehviläinen; Anne Berner

Minister of Social Affairs and Health
- In office 22 June 2011 – 24 June 2014
- Prime Minister: Jyrki Katainen
- Preceded by: Juha Rehula
- Succeeded by: Laura Räty

Member of the Parliament
- Incumbent
- Assumed office 19 March 2003

Personal details
- Born: 4 June 1960 (age 66) Ylihärmä, Finland (now Kauhava)
- Party: National Coalition Party
- Education: Seinäjoki University; University of Oulu; University of Kuopio; University of Tampere

Paula Risikko (born 4 June 1960) is a Finnish politician. She is from Seinäjoki and represents the National Coalition Party. Risikko has previously served as the Minister of Social Services 2011–2014 and Minister of Transport and Local Government 2014–2015.

Paula Risikko is Doctor of Science (Health Care) in 1997 from the University of Tampere. Her dissertation was entitled “The current and future quality requirement in nursery”. Risikko has received Honorary Doctorate from the University of Vaasa. She is taking a break from her regular position as the Vice Rector of the Seinäjoki University of Applied Sciences, because of her involvement in politics. In 2007 parliamentary elections, Risikko received 9,266 votes.

In the wake of the 2018 Oulu children sexual abuse gangs, Risikko stated her position in favor of deporting foreign sexual predators, saying: "We’ll deliver punishments for these kinds of crimes and, if necessary, send you back to your home country.”

Risikko has donated to numerous health care organizations such as the NGO's addressing Autism and Asperger's Syndrome, the Finnish delegation to the Cancer Society, Diabetes Association, Finland MS Association, Arthritis Foundation and, for example, Alfred Korde's Finland and UNIFEM- Organization.

Risikko has been married to her husband Heikki Tapani Risikko since 2000. In 2006 Paula and her husband adopted a Chinese daughter Aino Taika Huanzhen.

Political offices
Preceded by Maria Lohela	Speaker of Parliament; 2018–2019	Succeeded by Antti Rinne
Preceded by Petteri Orpo	Minister of the Interior; 2016–2018	Succeeded by Kai Mykkänen
