= Suvi Lindén =

Finnish politician

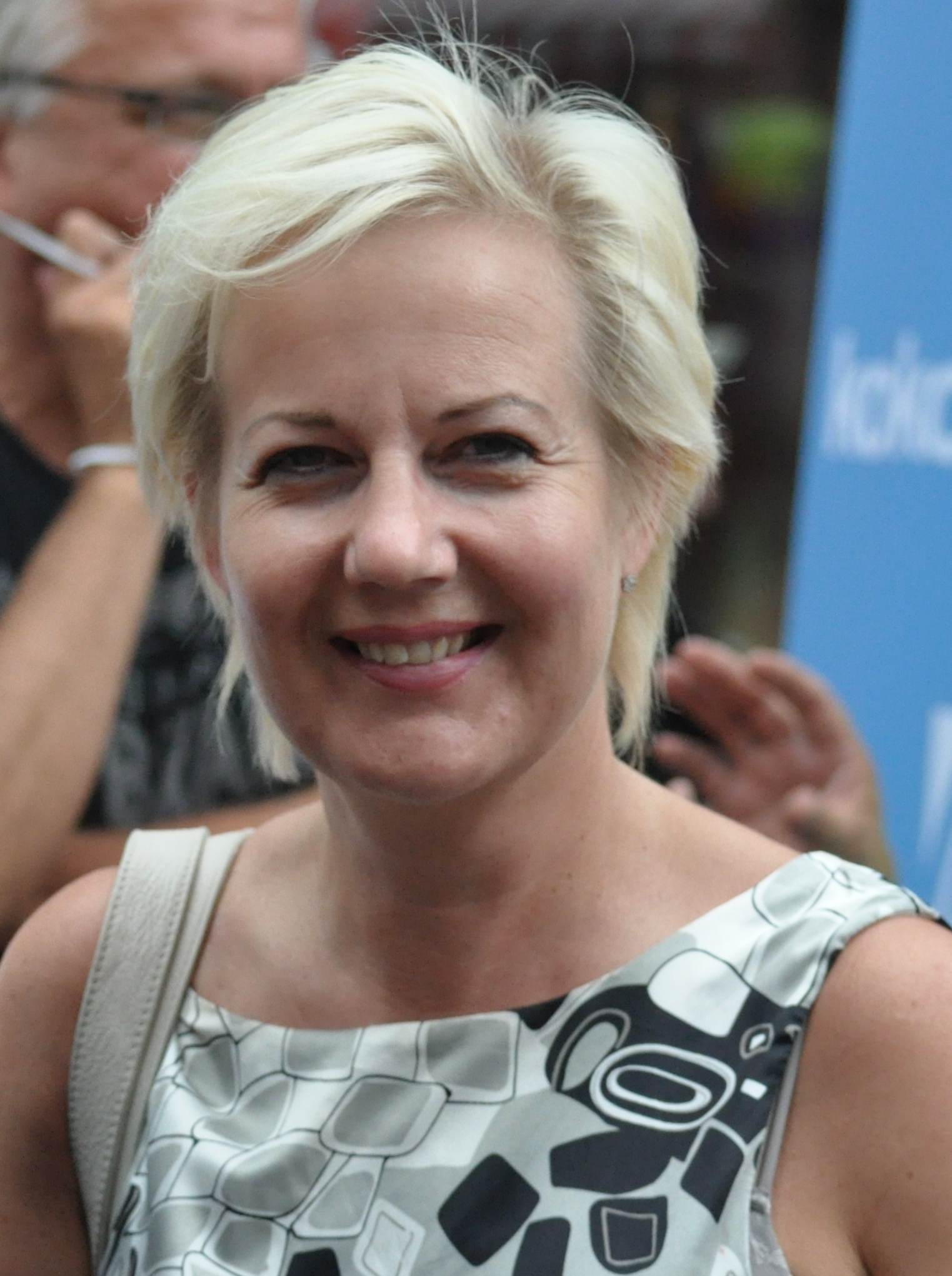
Suvi Lindén

Suvi Helmi Tellervo Lindén (born 19 April 1962 in Helsinki) is a Finnish politician. A member of the National Coalition Party, she represented the electoral district of Oulu in the Parliament of Finland from 1995 to 2011 and served as the Minister of Culture in Lipponen I Cabinet from 1999 to 2002 and as the Minister of Communications in Vanhanen II Cabinet and Kiviniemi Cabinet from 2007 to 2011.

== Career ==
Lindén was elected to the City Council of Oulu in 1988 and to the Parliament seven years later. Lindén graduated as Master of Philosophy from the University of Oulu in 1998. The subject of her pro gradu treatise was how MPs use the Internet. Lindén's tenure as the Minister of Culture and Sports was marked by a large doping scandal at the FIS Nordic World Ski Championships 2001 in Lahti. After a ministerial career of three years, she resigned from the government in 2002 after it was revealed that she had given public aid to a golf course that was partly owned by her and her family.

Lindén returned to the government five years later. As the Minister of Communications, she faced a controversy on an act nicknamed Lex Nokia. In the 2011 Finnish parliamentary election she was not re-elected for a new term.
