= Minister of Family Affairs and Social Services (Finland) =

Finnish cabinet position

The Minister of Family Affairs and Social Services (Finnish: perhe- ja peruspalveluministeri, Swedish: familje- och omsorgsminister) is one of the Finnish Government's ministerial portfolios. The ministerial position is located, along with the Minister of Social Affairs and Health, within the Ministry of Social Affairs and Health.

The Orpo Cabinet's incumbent Minister of Family Affairs and Social Services is Sanni Grahn-Laasonen of the National Coalition Party.
