= Minister of Social Affairs and Health (Finland) =

Finnish cabinet position

- Suomen sosiaali- ja terveysministeri
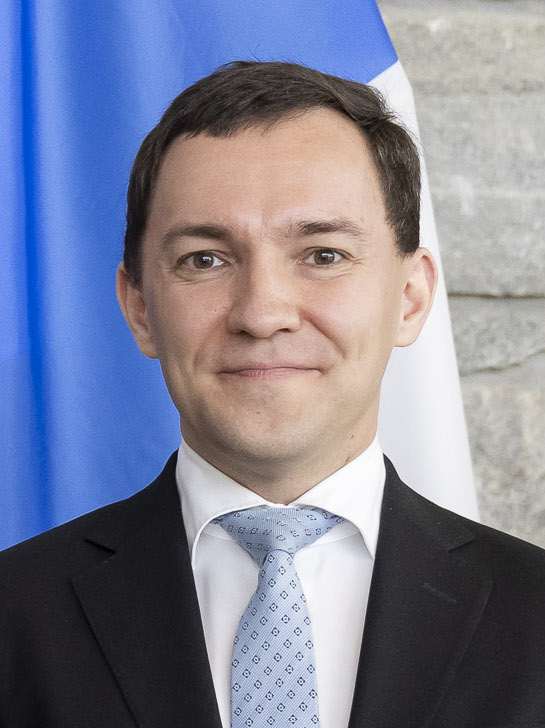
- Incumbent; Wille Rydman since 20 February 2026
- Appointer: President of Finland
- Formation: 27 November 1917; 108 years ago
- First holder: Oskari Wilho Louhivuori

The minister of social affairs and health (Finnish: sosiaali- ja terveysministeri, Swedish: social- och hälsovårdsminister) is one of the Finnish Government's ministerial positions. The minister is one of two portfolios associated with the Ministry of Social Affairs and Health; the other one is the minister of family affairs and social services.

The Orpo Cabinet's incumbent minister of social affairs and health is Wille Rydman of the Finns Party.

The longest serving ministers of social affairs and health have been Paula Risikko (2,624 days from 2007 to 2014), Liisa Hyssälä (2,595 days from 2003 to 2010), Sinikka Mönkäre (2,355 days from 1995 to 2005), Tyyne Leivo-Larsson (1,836 days from 1948 to 1958) and Eeva Kuuskoski (1,821 days from 1983 to 1992).
