= Minister of Defence (Finland) =

Finnish cabinet position

Minister of Defence of the Republic of Finland
- Puolustusministeri; Försvarsminister
- Flag of the Minister of Defence

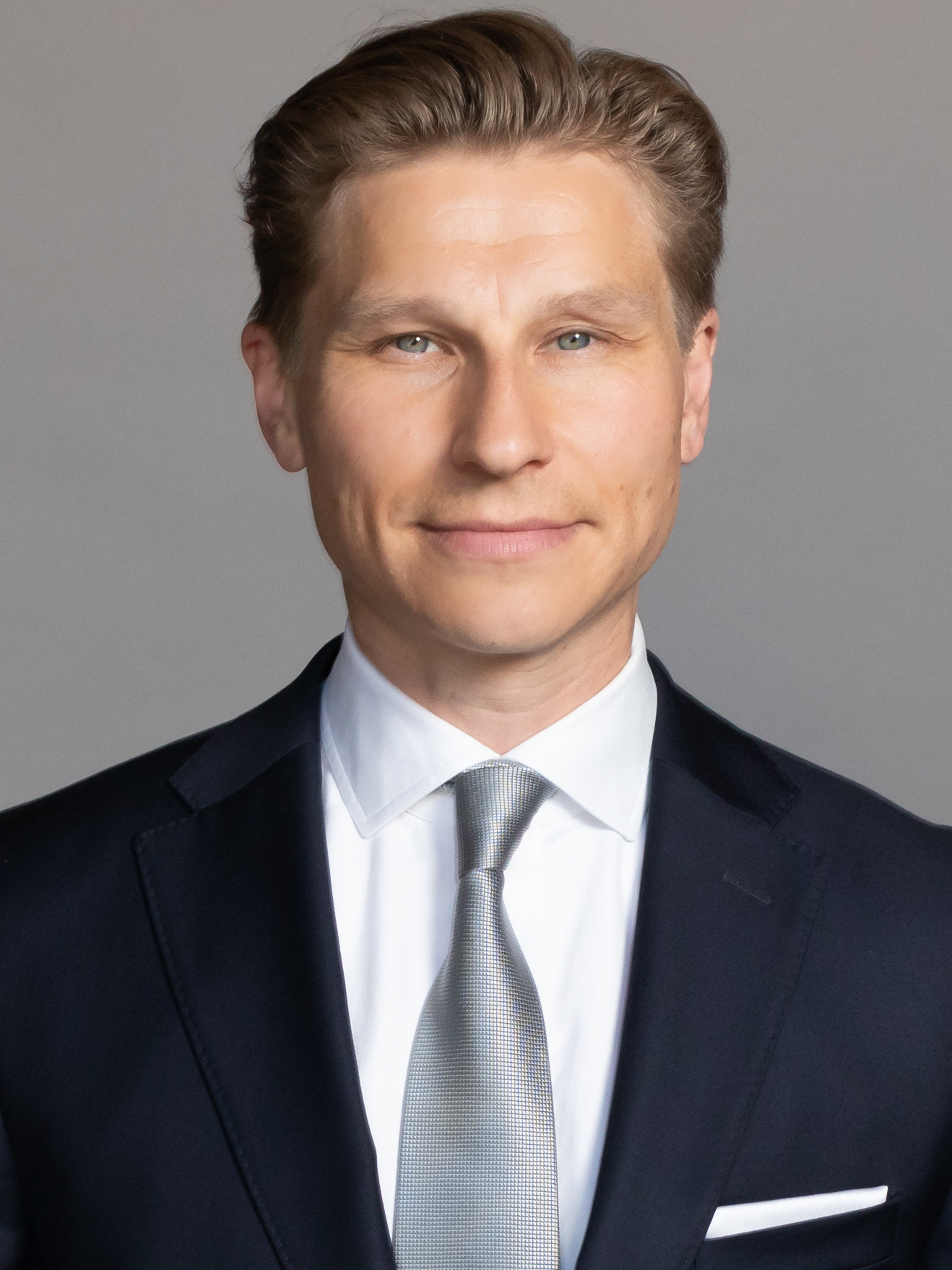
- Incumbent; Antti Häkkänen since 20 June 2023
- Ministry of Defence
- Member of: Cabinet
- Seat: Helsinki, Finland
- Nominator: Prime Minister
- Appointer: President
- Term length: Four years (de facto)
- Formation: 1918; 108 years ago
- First holder: Wilhelm Thesleff
- Website: www.defmin.fi/english

The Minister of Defence (Finnish: puolustusministeri, Swedish: försvarsminister) is a member of the Finnish Council of State. As the head of the Ministry of Defence, the minister is responsible for the administration of national defence. The ministry is headquartered in Helsinki. The current Minister of Defence is Antti Häkkänen.

From June to November 1918 the post was called Chief of the War Department, and from then until 1922 the post was called the Minister of War.

The President of the Republic is the commander-in-chief of the Finnish Defence Forces. The commander of the military forces is the Chief of Defence.

== Ministry offices ==
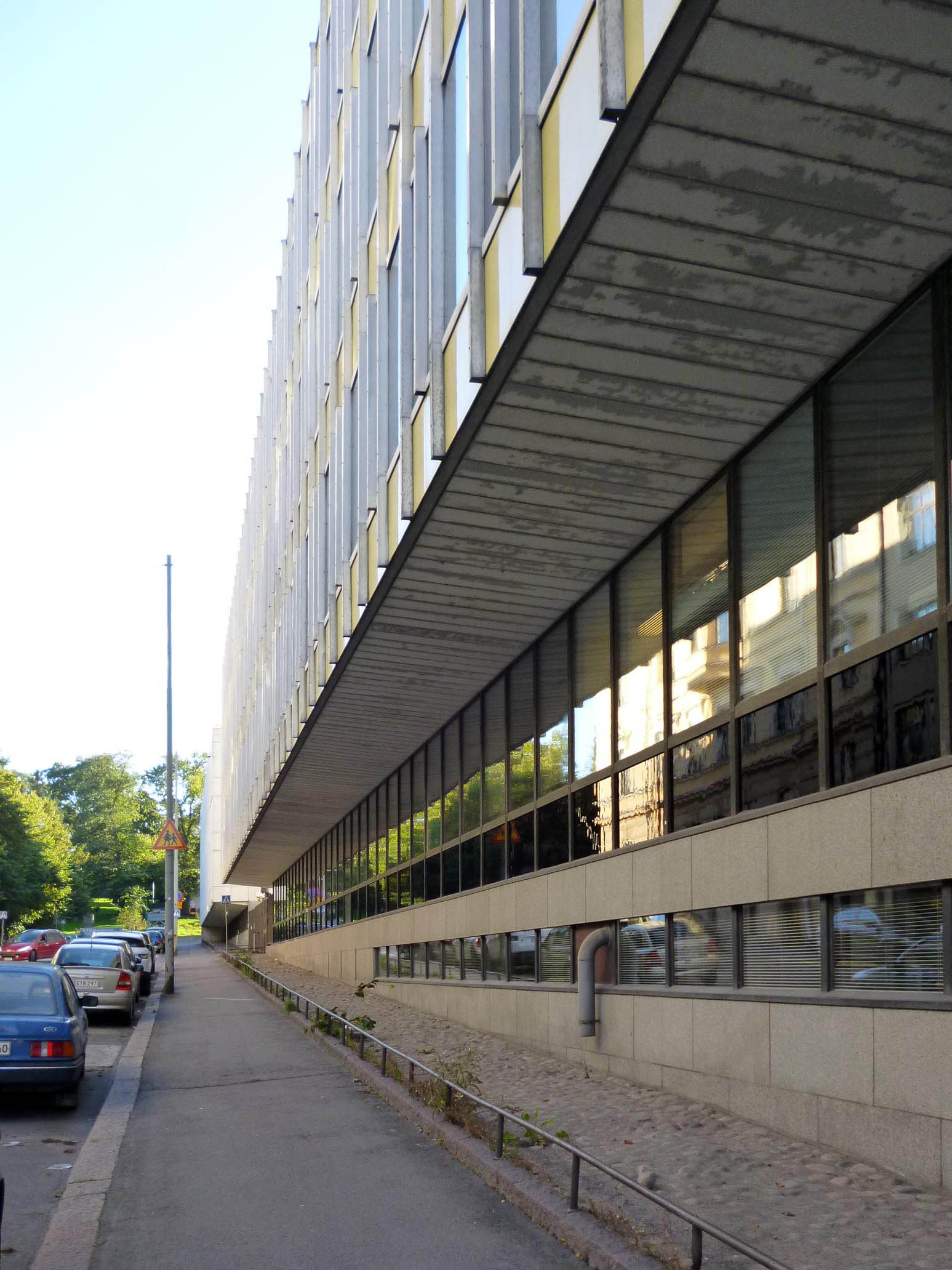

Finnish Ministry of Defence Offices consists of two wings:

- South Makasiinikatu 8 since - Built by CL Engel as barracks for the Finnish Guard in 1922 and destroyed in 1944 and rebuilt by retaining the original walls from 1954 to 1956 and used as Defense Headquarters since 1956
- Fabiansgatan 2 - newer wing was built in 1961 by Finnish architects Viljo Revell and Heikki Castrén.

=== Previous ministry offices ===
- Eteläesplanadi 10 - 1918-1921 (the Ministry of Justice has also been located here)
- Korkeavuorenkatu 21 (Ohrana House) - relocated in 1921 and here until beginning of World War II; has also served as Finnish Border Guard Headquarters
- Snellmaninkatu 4-6 - moved here 1941 to 1956 and now home to Finnish Financial Supervision Authority

== List of ministers of defence ==
No.	Portrait	Minister	Took office	Left office	Time in office	Party	Cabinet
1	Vilhelm Thesleff	Vilhelm Thesleff (1880–1941)	27 May 1918	27 November 1918	184 days	Independent	Paasikivi I
2	Rudolf Walden	Rudolf Walden (1878–1946)	27 November 1918	15 August 1919	261 days	Independent	Ingman; K. Castrén
3	Karl Emil Berg	Karl Emil Berg (1869–1921)	15 August 1919	15 March 1920	213 days	Independent	Vennola I
4	Bruno Jalander	Bruno Jalander (1872–1966)	15 March 1920	9 April 1921	1 year, 25 days	Independent	Erich
5	Onni Hämäläinen	Onni Hämäläinen (1885–1954)	9 April 1921	3 September 1921	147 days	Independent	Vennola II
(4)	Bruno Jalander	Bruno Jalander (1872–1966)	3 September 1921	22 June 1923	1 year, 292 days	Independent	Vennola II; Cajander I Kallio I
6	Kyösti Kallio	Kyösti Kallio (1873–1940)	22 June 1923	16 August 1923	55 days	Centre	Kallio I
7	Vilho Nenonen	Vilho Nenonen (1883–1960)	16 August 1923	18 January 1924	155 days	Independent	Kallio I
8	Viktor Henrik Schvindt	Viktor Henrik Schvindt (1866–1928)	18 January 1924	11 March 1924	53 days	Independent	Cajander II
9	Ivar Aminoff	Ivar Aminoff (1868–1931)	11 March 1924	31 May 1924	81 days	Independent	Cajander II
10	Lauri Malmberg	Lauri Malmberg (1888–1948)	31 May 1924	31 March 1925	304 days	Independent	Ingman II
11	Aleksander Lampén	Aleksander Lampén (1879–1935)	31 March 1925	31 December 1925	275 days	National Coalition	Tulenheimo
12	Leonard Hjelmman	Leonard Hjelmman (1869–1952)	31 December 1925	13 December 1926	347 days	National Coalition	Kallio II
13	Kaarlo Heinonen	Kaarlo Heinonen (1878–1944)	13 December 1926	17 December 1927	1 year, 4 days	SDP	Tanner
14	Jalo Lahdensuo	Jalo Lahdensuo (1882–1973)	17 December 1927	22 December 1928	1 year, 5 days	Centre	Sunila I
15	Aimo Cajander	Aimo Cajander (1879–1943)	22 December 1928	16 August 1929	237 days	National Progressive	Mantere
16	Juho Niukkanen	Juho Niukkanen (1888–1954)	16 August 1929	4 July 1930	322 days	Centre	Kallio III
17	Albin Manner	Albin Manner (1888–1954)	10 July 1930	21 March 1931	254 days	Centre	Svinhufvud II
(14)	Jalo Lahdensuo	Jalo Lahdensuo (1882–1973)	21 March 1931	14 December 1932	1 year, 268 days	Centre	Sunila II
18	Arvi Oksala	Arvi Oksala (1891–1949)	14 December 1932	12 March 1937	4 years, 88 days	Independent	Kivimäki; Kallio IV
(16)	Juho Niukkanen	Juho Niukkanen (1888–1954)	12 March 1937	27 March 1940	3 years, 15 days	Centre	Cajander III; Ryti I
(2)	Rudolf Walden	Rudolf Walden (1878–1946)	27 March 1940	1 December 1944	4 years, 249 days	Independent	Ryti II; Rangell; Linkomies; Hackzell; U. Castrén; Paasikivi II
19	Väinö Valve	Väinö Valve (1895–1995)	1 December 1944	17 April 1945	137 days	Independent	Paasikivi II
20	Mauno Pekkala	Mauno Pekkala (1890–1952)	17 April 1945	27 March 1946	344 days	SKDL	Paasikivi III; Pekkala
21	Yrjö Kallinen	Yrjö Kallinen (1886–1976)	27 March 1946	29 July 1948	2 years, 124 days	SDP	Pekkala
22	Emil Skog	Emil Skog (1897–1981)	29 July 1948	17 March 1950	1 year, 231 days	SDP	Fagerholm I
23	Kustaa Tiitu	Kustaa Tiitu (1896–1990)	17 March 1950	17 January 1951	306 days	Centre	Kekkonen I
(22)	Emil Skog	Emil Skog (1897–1981)	17 January 1951	9 July 1953	2 years, 173 days	SDP	Kekkonen II-III
24	Kauno Kleemola	Kauno Kleemola (1906–1965)	9 July 1953	17 November 1953	131 days	Centre	Kekkonen IV
25	Päiviö Hetemäki	Päiviö Hetemäki (1913–1980)	17 November 1953	5 May 1954	169 days	National Coalition	Tuomioja
(22)	Emil Skog	Emil Skog (1897–1981)	5 May 1954	27 May 1957	3 years, 22 days	SDP	Törngren; Kekkonen V Fagerholm II
26	Atte Pakkanen	Atte Pakkanen (1912–1994)	27 May 1957	2 September 1957	98 days	Centre	Sukselainen I
27	Pekka Malinen	Pekka Malinen (1921–2004)	2 September 1957	29 November 1957	88 days	Liberals	Sukselainen I
28	Kalle Lehmus	Kalle Lehmus (1907–1987)	29 November 1957	26 April 1958	148 days	Independent	von Fieandt
29	Edvard Björkenheim	Edvard Björkenheim (1901–1965)	26 April 1958	29 August 1958	125 days	Independent	Kuuskoski
30	Toivo Wiherheimo	Toivo Wiherheimo (1898–1970)	29 August 1958	13 January 1959	137 days	National Coalition	Fagerholm II
31	Leo Häppölä	Leo Häppölä (1911–1998)	13 January 1959	14 July 1961	2 years, 182 days	Centre	Sukselainen II
(29)	Edvard Björkenheim	Edvard Björkenheim (1901–1965)	14 July 1961	13 April 1962	273 days	Centre	Miettunen I
32	Arvo Pentti	Arvo Pentti (1915–1986)	13 April 1962	18 December 1963	1 year, 249 days	Centre	Karjalainen I
33	Kaarlo Leinonen	Kaarlo Leinonen (1914–1975)	18 December 1963	12 September 1964	269 days	Independent	Lehto
(32)	Arvo Pentti	Arvo Pentti (1915–1986)	12 September 1964	27 May 1966	1 year, 257 days	Centre	Virolainen
34	Sulo Suorttanen	Sulo Suorttanen (1921–2005)	27 May 1966	14 May 1970	3 years, 352 days	Centre	Paasio I Koivisto I
(32)	Arvo Pentti	Arvo Pentti (1915–1986)	14 May 1970	15 July 1970	62 days	Independent	Aura I
35	Kristian Gestrin	Kristian Gestrin (1929–1990)	15 July 1970	29 October 1971	1 year, 106 days	RKP	Karjalainen II
(32)	Arvo Pentti	Arvo Pentti (1915–1986)	29 October 1971	23 February 1972	117 days	Independent	Aura II
36	Sulo Hostila	Sulo Hostila (1920–2002)	23 February 1972	4 September 1972	194 days	SDP	Paasio II
(35)	Kristian Gestrin	Kristian Gestrin (1929–1990)	4 September 1972	30 September 1974	2 years, 26 days	RKP	Sorsa I
37	Carl-Olaf Homén	Carl-Olaf Homén (born 1936)	1 October 1974	13 June 1975	255 days	RKP	Sorsa I
38	Erkki Huurtamo	Erkki Huurtamo (1917–1999)	13 June 1975	30 November 1975	170 days	Independent	Liinamaa
39	Ingvar S. Melin	Ingvar S. Melin (1932–2011)	30 November 1975	29 September 1976	304 days	RKP	Miettunen II
40	Seppo Westerlund	Seppo Westerlund (1930–2014)	29 September 1976	15 May 1977	228 days	Liberals	Miettunen II
41	Taisto Tähkämaa	Taisto Tähkämaa (1924–2025)	15 May 1977	26 May 1979	2 years, 11 days	Centre	Sorsa II
42	Lasse Äikäs	Lasse Äikäs (1932–1988)	26 May 1979	19 February 1982	2 years, 269 days	Centre	Koivisto II
43	Juhani Saukkonen	Juhani Saukkonen (1937–2024)	19 February 1982	6 May 1983	1 year, 76 days	Centre	Sorsa III
44	Veikko Pihlajamäki	Veikko Pihlajamäki (1922–2007)	6 May 1983	30 April 1987	3 years, 359 days	Centre	Sorsa IV
45	Ole Norrback	Ole Norrback (born 1941)	30 April 1987	13 June 1990	3 years, 44 days	RKP	Holkeri
46	Elisabeth Rehn	Elisabeth Rehn (born 1935)	13 June 1990	1 January 1995	4 years, 202 days	RKP	Holkeri; Aho
47	Jan-Erik Enestam	Jan-Erik Enestam (born 1947)	2 January 1995	13 April 1995	101 days	RKP	Aho
48	Anneli Taina	Anneli Taina (born 1951)	13 April 1995	15 April 1999	4 years, 2 days	National Coalition	Lipponen I
(47)	Jan-Erik Enestam	Jan-Erik Enestam (born 1947)	15 April 1999	17 April 2003	4 years, 2 days	RKP	Lipponen II
49	Matti Vanhanen	Matti Vanhanen (born 1955)	17 April 2003	24 June 2003	68 days	Centre	Jäätteenmäki
50	Seppo Kääriäinen	Seppo Kääriäinen (born 1948)	24 June 2003	19 April 2007	3 years, 299 days	Centre	Vanhanen I
51	Jyri Häkämies	Jyri Häkämies (born 1961)	19 April 2007	22 June 2011	4 years, 64 days	National Coalition	Vanhanen II; Kiviniemi
52	Stefan Wallin	Stefan Wallin (born 1967)	22 June 2011	5 July 2012	1 year, 13 days	RKP	Katainen
53	Carl Haglund	Carl Haglund (born 1979)	5 July 2012	29 May 2015	2 years, 328 days	RKP	Katainen; Stubb
54	Jussi Niinistö	Jussi Niinistö (born 1970)	29 May 2015	6 June 2019	4 years, 8 days	Finns	Sipilä
55	Antti Kaikkonen	Antti Kaikkonen (born 1974)	6 June 2019	5 January 2023	3 years, 213 days	Centre	Rinne; Marin
56	Mikko Savola	Mikko Savola (born 1981)	5 January 2023	28 February 2023	54 days	Centre	Marin
(55)	Antti Kaikkonen	Antti Kaikkonen (born 1974)	28 February 2023	20 June 2023	112 days	Centre	Marin
57	Antti Häkkänen	Antti Häkkänen (born 1985)	20 June 2023	Incumbent	3 years, 79 days	National Coalition	Orpo

== See also ==
- Minister of Defence
