= Miettunen I cabinet =

Government of Finland from 1961 to 1962

Miettunen I Cabinet
- 46th Cabinet of Finland
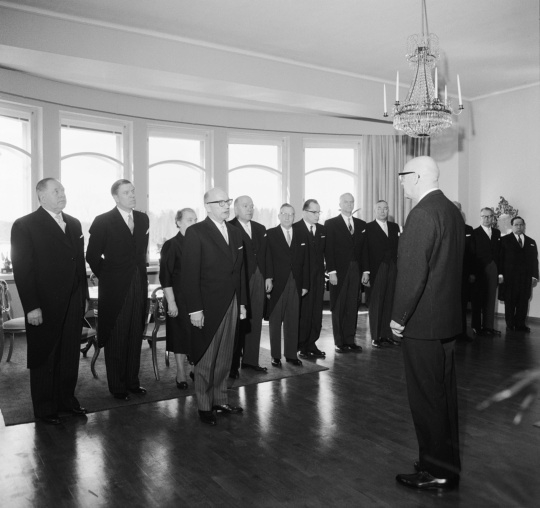
- Miettunen's government, which had been fired April 13, at President Urho Kekkonen's home, Tamminiemi. PM Martti Miettunen speaks
- Date formed: 14 July 1961
- Date dissolved: 13 April 1962

People and organisations
- Prime Minister: Martti Miettunen
- Total no. of members: 16
- Member party: Agrarian League
- Status in legislature: Minority government

History
- Predecessor: Sukselainen II
- Successor: Karjalainen I

Martti Miettunen's first cabinet was the 46th government of Republic of Finland. Cabinet's time period was from July 14, 1961 to April 13, 1962. It was a minority government.

Assembly
Minister	Period of office	Party
Prime Minister; Martti Miettunen	July 14, 1961- April 13, 1962	Agrarian League
Minister of Foreign Affairs; Ahti Karjalainen	July 14, 1961- April 13, 1962	Agrarian League
Minister of Justice; Pauli Lehtosalo	July 14, 1961- April 13, 1962	Agrarian League
Minister of Defence; Edvard Björkenheim	July 14, 1961 – April 13, 1962	Agrarian League
Minister of the Interior; Eemil Luukka	July 14, 1961 – April 13, 1962	Agrarian League
Minister of Finance; Wiljam Sarjala	July 14, 1961 – April 13, 1962	Agrarian League
Minister of Finance Juho-Eino Niemi	July 14, 1961 – April 13, 1962	Agrarian League
Minister of Education; Heikki Hosia	July 14, 1961 – April 13, 1962	Agrarian League
Minister of Agriculture; Johannes Virolainen	July 14, 1961 – April 13, 1962	Agrarian League
Deputy Minister of Agriculture; Tahvo Rönkkö	July 14, 1961 – April 13, 1962	Agrarian League
Minister of Transport and Public Works; Kauno Kleemola; Eeli Erkkilä	July 14, 1961 – February 26, 1962; February 26, 1962 – April 13, 1962	Agrarian League
Deputy Minister of Transport and Public Works; Eeli Erkkilä	July 14, 1961 – April 13, 1962	Agrarian League
Minister of Trade and Industry Ilmari Hustich	July 14, 1961 – April 13, 1962	Independent
Deputy Minister of Trade and Industry; Pauli Lehtosalo	August 25, 1961 – April 13, 1962	Agrarian League
Minister of Social Affairs; Vieno Simonen	July 14, 1961 – April 13, 1962	Agrarian League
Deputy Minister of Social Affairs; Mauno Jussila	July 14, 1961 – April 13, 1962	Agrarian League

Preceded by Vieno Johannes Sukselainen's second cabinet	Cabinet of Finland; July 14, 1961 – April 13, 1962	Succeeded by Ahti Karjalainen's first cabinet
