= Kalle Lehmus =

Finnish military officer, civil servant and politician (1907–1987)

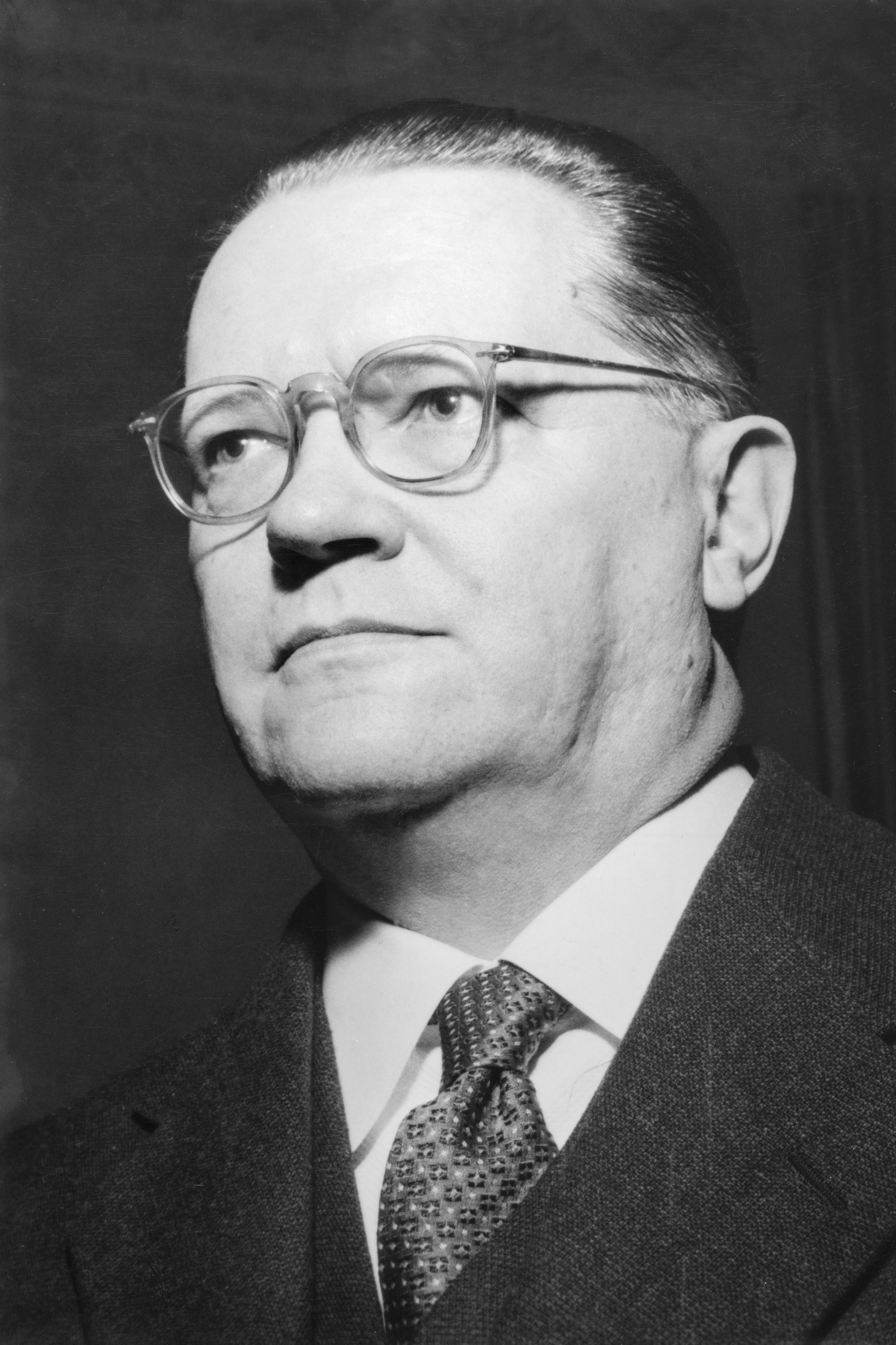

Minister of Defence of Finland
- In office 1957–1958
- Prime Minister: Rainer von Fieandt
- Preceded by: Pekka Malinen
- Succeeded by: Lars Björkenheim

Personal details
- Born: Kaarle Aukusti Lehmus; 29 December 1907 Tampere, Grand Duchy of Finland
- Died: 3 March 1987 (aged 79) Helsinki, Finland
- Resting place: Sandudds begravningsplats, Helsinki
- Party: Social Democratic Party of Finland
- Spouse(s): Tilda Maria Sundqvist, Helvi Severina Sipilä (m. 1942)

Kaarle (Kalle) Aukusti Lehmus (29 December 1907 – 3 March 1987) was a Finnish military officer, civil servant and politician with a unique career as a political officer bridging the Social Democratic Party and the armed forces. He served as head of the information division of Finnish Headquarters during the Continuation War, and subsequently led military intelligence. He was Secretary-General of the Ministry of Defence from 1955 to 1958 and Minister of Defence in 1957–1958, but was dismissed in 1958 following the discovery of secret weapons acquisitions from the West.

== Biography ==
=== Early career and party work ===
Lehmus joined the editorial staff of the Social Democratic Party's main organ Suomen Sosialidemokraatti in 1929 and became a party official in 1936. In this role he fought against the party's left-wing opposition during the final years of peace and during the period between the Winter War and the Continuation War in 1940–1941, when he also engaged in the campaign against the pro-Soviet Finnish–Soviet Peace and Friendship Society.

=== Wartime role ===
Lehmus was a central figure in the founding of Finland's Brothers-in-Arms Association in 1941 and served during the Continuation War as head of the information division of Finnish Headquarters. In this capacity he acted as an intermediary between Commander-in-Chief Mannerheim and the Social Democrats, particularly Väinö Tanner.

=== Postwar career ===
After the war Lehmus continued as head of the information division at the General Staff from 1944 to 1955, while also leading military intelligence, informally known as "Lehmus's shop".

When Defence Minister Emil Skog wished to promote Lehmus to colonel and appoint him Secretary-General of the Ministry of Defence, a delegation from the Officers' Association called on Skog to protest, arguing that the appointment would open the way for political nominations. President J. K. Paasikivi, who sharply criticised the Officers' Association's conduct, nonetheless appointed Lehmus. Paasikivi considered the post to be administrative rather than military in nature, and believed it important that Social Democrats should hold positions within the armed forces.

President Urho Kekkonen appointed Lehmus Minister of Defence in Rainer von Fieandt's short-lived caretaker government in 1957–1958.

=== Dismissal ===
Lehmus was dismissed in 1958 after large sums of money were discovered in his bank accounts. The funds consisted of domestic and foreign donations for covert operations, and had been used in part to acquire weapons from the West for study by army specialists — weapons that were prohibited under the peace treaty and therefore had to be procured in secret. The sensitive nature of the funds meant that neither their purpose nor their origin could be publicly disclosed, which effectively silenced his defenders. According to historian Ilkka Herlin, Lehmus's opponents within the army and right-wing pro-Western figures were behind the prosecution. Lehmus lost both his post and his pension rights.

=== Writing ===
Lehmus published several books, including Tuntematon Mannerheim (The Unknown Mannerheim, 1967) and Kolme kriisiä (Three Crises, 1971), in which he presented his views on the Continuation War and the early postwar years.
