= Sukselainen II cabinet =

Cabinet of Finland between 1959 and 1961

Sukselainen II Cabinet
- 45th Cabinet of Finland
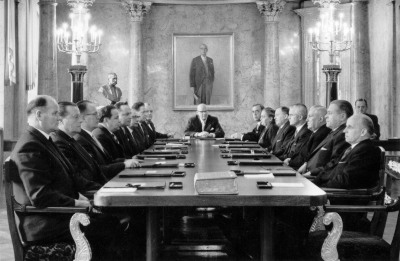
- Sukselainen's second cabinet
- Date formed: 13 January 1959
- Date dissolved: 14 July 1961

People and organisations
- Prime Minister: V. J. Sukselainen
- Member parties: Agrarian League; RKP
- Status in legislature: Minority government

History
- Predecessor: Fagerholm III
- Successor: Miettunen I

Vieno Johannes Sukselainen's second cabinet was the 45th government of Republic of Finland. Cabinet's time period was from 13 January 1959, to 14 July 1961. It was a minority government.

Assembly
Minister	Period of office	Party
Prime Minister; Vieno Johannes Sukselainen	13 January 1959 – 3 July 1961	Agrarian Party
Minister of Foreign Affairs; Ralf Törngren; Vieno Johannes Sukselainen; Ahti Karjalainen	13 January 1959 –16 May 1961; 19 May 1961 – 19 June 1961; 19 June 1961 – 14 July 1961	Swedish People's Party; Agrarian Party; Agrarian Party
Deputy Minister of Foreign Affairs; Ahti Karjalainen	13 January 1959 – 19 June 1961	Agrarian Party
Minister of Justice; Antti Hannikainen; Pauli Lehtosalo	13 January 1959 – 14 April 1961; 14 April 1961 – 14 July 1961	Agrarian Party; Agrarian Party
Minister of Defence; Leo Häppölä	13 January 1959 – 14 July 1961	Agrarian Party
Minister of the Interior (deputy prime minister from July 3, 1961, to July 14, 1961); Eino Palovesi; Eemil Luukka	13 January 1959 – 4 February 1960; 4 February 1960 – 14 July 1961	Agrarian Party; Agrarian Party
Minister of Finance Wiljam Sarjala	13 January 1959 – 14 July 1961	Agrarian Party
Minister of Education; Heikki Hosia	13 January 1959 – 14 July 1961	Agrarian Party
Minister of Agriculture Einari Jaakkola	13 January 1959 – 14 July 1961	Agrarian Party
Deputy Minister of Agriculture; Toivo Antila	13 January 1959 – 14 July 1961	Agrarian Party
Minister of Transport and Public Works; Kauno Kleemola	13 January 1959 – 14 July 1961	Agrarian Party
Deputy Minister of Transport and Public Works Arvo Korsimo	13 January 1959 – 14 July 1961	Agrarian Party
Minister of Trade and Industry; Ahti Karjalainen; Björn Westerlund	13 January 1959 – 19 June 1961; 19 June 1961 – 14 July 1961	Agrarian Party; Swedish People's Party
Deputy Minister of Trade and Industry; Pauli Lehtosalo	29 September 1959 – 14 July 1961	Agrarian Party
Minister of Social Affairs; Vieno Simonen	13 January 1959 – 14 July 1961	Agrarian Party
Deputy Minister of Social Affairs; Eeli Erkkilä	13 January 1959 – 14 July 1961	Agrarian Party

Preceded by Fagerholm III	Cabinet of Finland; 13 January 1959 – 14 July 1961	Succeeded by Miettunen I
