= Finland and weapons of mass destruction =

Finland does not possess weapons of mass destruction and is a party to several international treaties aimed at preventing their development, production, and proliferation. These include agreements related to nuclear, chemical, and biological weapons.

== Nuclear weapons ==
Finland is a member of the Treaty on the Non-Proliferation of Nuclear Weapons and the Comprehensive Nuclear-Test-Ban Treaty.

Under the Nuclear Energy Act 1987, Finland is not allowed to develop, manufacture, possess, test, or import nuclear weapons. In March 2026, Minister of Defence Antti Häkkänen announced that Finland would be lifting its ban on nuclear weapons imports, transportation, or possession. President Alexander Stubb stated that participating in NATOs defence and deterrence framework was within Finland's best interests. Stubb later stated that "Finland does not need nuclear weapons in peacetime. This is about nuclear deterrence—adeterrent to ensure they would never have to be used."

In September 2026, Finland joined a French nuclear umbrella initiative, under which members may temporarily host French nuclear armed "strategic air forces", conduct joint nuclear drills, and coordinate on collective security.
