= Karjalainen I cabinet =

First cabinet of Ahti Karjalainen, Prime Minister of Finland

Karjalainen I Cabinet
- 47th Cabinet of Finland
- Date formed: 13 April 1962
- Date dissolved: 18 December 1963

People and organisations
- Prime Minister: Ahti Karjalainen
- Member parties: Agrarian League; National Coalition; TPSL (until October 1963); People's Party; RKP
- Status in legislature: Majority government

History
- Predecessor: Miettunen I
- Successor: Lehto

Ahti Karjalainen's first cabinet was the 47th government of Republic of Finland. Cabinet's time period was from April 13, 1962, to December 18, 1963. It was a majority government. Social Democratic Union of Workers and Smallholders left the government in October 1963.

Assembly
Minister	Period of office	Party
Prime Minister; Ahti Karjalainen; Johannes Virolainen, deputy	April 13, 1962 – December 18, 1963; April 13, 1962 – December 18, 1963	Agrarian League
Minister at the Council of State; Olavi J. Mattila	November 1, 1963 – December 18, 1963	Independent
Minister of Foreign Affairs; Veli Merikoski	April 13, 1962 – December 18, 1963	People's Party
Deputy Minister of Foreign Affairs; Olavi J. Mattila	November 1, 1963 – December 18, 1963	Independent
Minister of Justice; Johan Otto Söderhjelm	April 13, 1962 – December 18, 1963	Swedish People's Party
Minister of Defence; Arvo Pentti	April 13, 1962 – December 18, 1963	Agrarian League
Minister of the Interior; Eeli Erkkilä; Niilo Ryhtä	April 13, 1962 -February 8, 1963; February 8, 1963 – December 18, 1963	Agrarian League; Agrarian League
Minister of Finance; Osmo P. Karttunen; Mauno Jussila	April 13, 1962 – December 18, 1963; April 13, 1962 – December 18, 1963	National Coalition Party; Agrarian League
Deputy Minister of Finance; Onni Koski; Johan Otto Söderhjelm; Mauno Jussila	April 13, 1962 – October 18, 1963; September 21, 1962 – November 1, 1963; November 1, 1963 – December 13, 1963	Social Democratic Union of Workers and Smallholders; Swedish People's Party; Agrarian League
Minister of Education; Armi Hosia	April 13, 1962 – December 18, 1963	People's Party
Minister of Agriculture; Johannes Virolainen	April 13, 1962 – December 18, 1963	Agrarian League
Deputy Minister of Agriculture; Verner Korsbäck	April 13, 1962 – December 18, 1963	Swedish People's Party
Minister of Transport and Public Works; Veikko Savela	April 13, 1962 – December 18, 1963	Agrarian League
Deputy Minister of Transport and Public Works; Onni Närvänen; Olavi Lahtela	April 13, 1962 -October 18, 1963; November 1, 1963 – December 18, 1963	Social Democratic Union of Workers and Smallholders; Agrarian League
Minister of Trade and Industry; Toivo Wiherheimo	April 13, 1962 – December 18, 1963	National Coalition Party
Minister of Social Affairs; Olavi Saarinen; Kyllikki Pohjala	April 13, 1962 – October 18, 1963; October 18, 1963 -December 18, 1963	Social Democratic Union of Workers and Smallholders; National Coalition Party
Deputy Minister of Social Affairs; Kyllikki Pohjala	April 13, 1962 -October 18, 1963	National Coalition Party

Preceded by Martti Miettunen's first cabinet	Cabinet of Finland; 13 April 1962 – 18 December 1963	Succeeded by Reino Ragnar Lehto's cabinet
