= Lehto cabinet =

Lehto Cabinet
- 48th Cabinet of Finland
- Date formed: 18 December 1963
- Date dissolved: 12 September 1964

People and organisations
- President: Urho Kekkonen
- Prime Minister: Reino Ragnar Lehto
- Deputy Prime Minister: Aarne Nuorvala
- Status in legislature: Caretaker government

History
- Predecessor: Karjalainen I
- Successor: Virolainen

Reino Lehto's cabinet was the 48th government of Republic of Finland. The cabinet existed from December 18, 1963 to September 12, 1964. It is the longest caretaker government in Finnish history.

Assembly
Minister	Period of office	Party
Prime Minister; Reino Lehto; Aarne Nuorvala, deputy Reino Oittinen, deputy	December 18, 1963 – September 12, 1964; December 18, 1963 – June 8, 1964; June 12, 1964 – September 12, 1964	Independent; Independent; Independent
Minister at Council of State; Aarne Nuorvala	December 18, 1963 – September 12, 1964	Independent
Minister of Foreign Affairs; Jaakko Hallama	December 18, 1963 – September 12, 1964	Independent
Minister of Justice Olavi Merimaa	December 18, 1963 – September 12, 1964	Independent
Minister of Defence; Kaarlo Leinonen	December 18, 1963 – September 12, 1964	Independent
Minister of the Interior Arno Hannus	December 18, 1963 – September 12, 1964	Independent
Minister of Finance Esko Rekola	December 18, 1963 – September 12, 1964	Independent
Deputy Minister of Finance Heikki Tuominen	December 18, 1963 – September 12, 1964	Independent
Minister of Education; Reino Oittinen	December 18, 1963 – September 12, 1964	Independent
Minister of Agriculture Samuli Suomela	December 18, 1963 – September 12, 1964	Independent
Minister of Transport and Public Works Martti Niskala	December 18, 1963 – September 12, 1964	Independent
Minister of Trade and Industry; Olavi J. Mattila	December 18, 1963 – September 12, 1964	Independent
Deputy Minister of Trade and Industry Aarno Niini	December 18, 1963 – September 12, 1964	Independent
Minister of Social Affairs Olof Ojala	December 18, 1963 – September 12, 1964	Independent
Deputy Minister of Social Affairs; Magnus Kull	December 18, 1963 – September 12, 1964	Independent

Preceded by Ahti Karjalainen's first cabinet	Cabinet of Finland; December 18, 1963–September 12, 1964	Succeeded by Johannes Virolainen's cabinet
