= Reino Ragnar Lehto =

Prime minister of Finland from 1963 to 1964

Reino R. Lehto
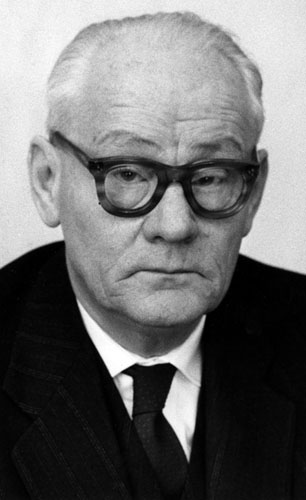

29th Prime Minister of Finland
- In office 18 December 1963 – 12 September 1964
- President: Urho Kekkonen
- Deputy: Aarne Nuorvala; Reino Oittinen
- Preceded by: Ahti Karjalainen
- Succeeded by: Johannes Virolainen

Personal details
- Born: Reino Ragnar Lagerlund; 2 May 1898 Turku, Finland
- Died: 13 July 1966 (aged 68) Helsinki, Finland
- Education: University of Helsinki
- Profession: Lawyer

Reino Ragnar Lehto (2 May 1898 – 13 July 1966; surname until 1901 Lagerlund) served as caretaker Prime Minister of Finland from 1963 to 1964, then served as governor of Uusimaa province until his death on 13 July 1966. He was a lawyer by profession.

== Cabinets ==
- Lehto Cabinet

Political offices
Preceded by Ahti Karjalainen	Prime Minister of Finland; 1963–1964	Succeeded by Johannes Virolainen
