= Mikko Savola =

Finnish politician

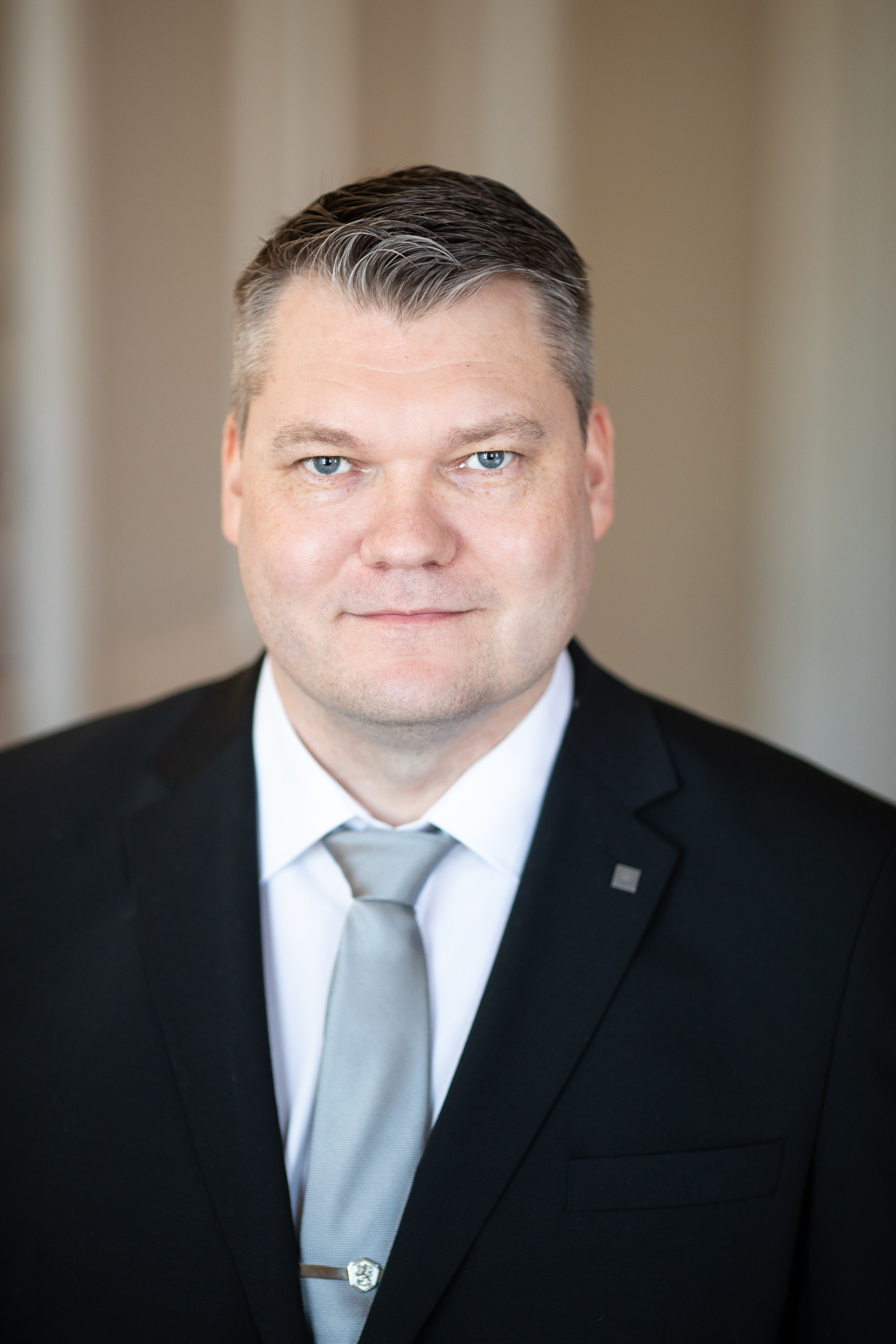
- Savola in 2023.

Minister of Defence
- In office 5 January – 28 February 2023
- Prime Minister: Sanna Marin
- Preceded by: Antti Kaikkonen
- Succeeded by: Antti Kaikkonen

Member of Finnish Parliament for Vaasa
- Incumbent
- Assumed office 20 April 2011

Personal details
- Born: Mikko Tapio Savola; 29 November 1981 (age 44) Ähtäri, South Ostrobothnia, Finland
- Party: Centre
- Occupation: Politician

Mikko Tapio Savola (born 29 November 1981 in Ähtäri) is a Finnish politician currently serving in the Parliament of Finland for the Centre Party at the Vaasa constituency.

Savola was appointed as interim Minister of Defence on 5 January 2023 after Antti Kaikkonen went on paternal leave. He held the position until Kaikkonen returned on 28 February.

Political offices
| Preceded by Antti Kaikkonen | Minister of Defence; 5 January 2023–28 February 2023 | Succeeded by Antti Kaikkonen |
