= Kaarlo Heinonen =

Finnish politician

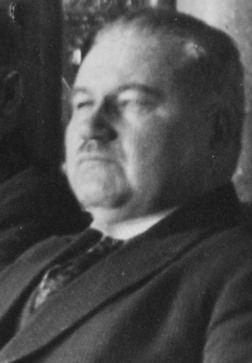

Kaarlo Richard Heinonen (9 February 1878, Naantali – 26 February 1944) was a Finnish politician. He was a Member of the Parliament of Finland for the Social Democratic Party of Finland from 1919 to 1922. He was Minister of Defence from 1926 to 1927.
