= Von Fieandt cabinet =

Government of Finland from 1957 to 1958

Von Fieandt Cabinet
- 42nd Cabinet of Finland
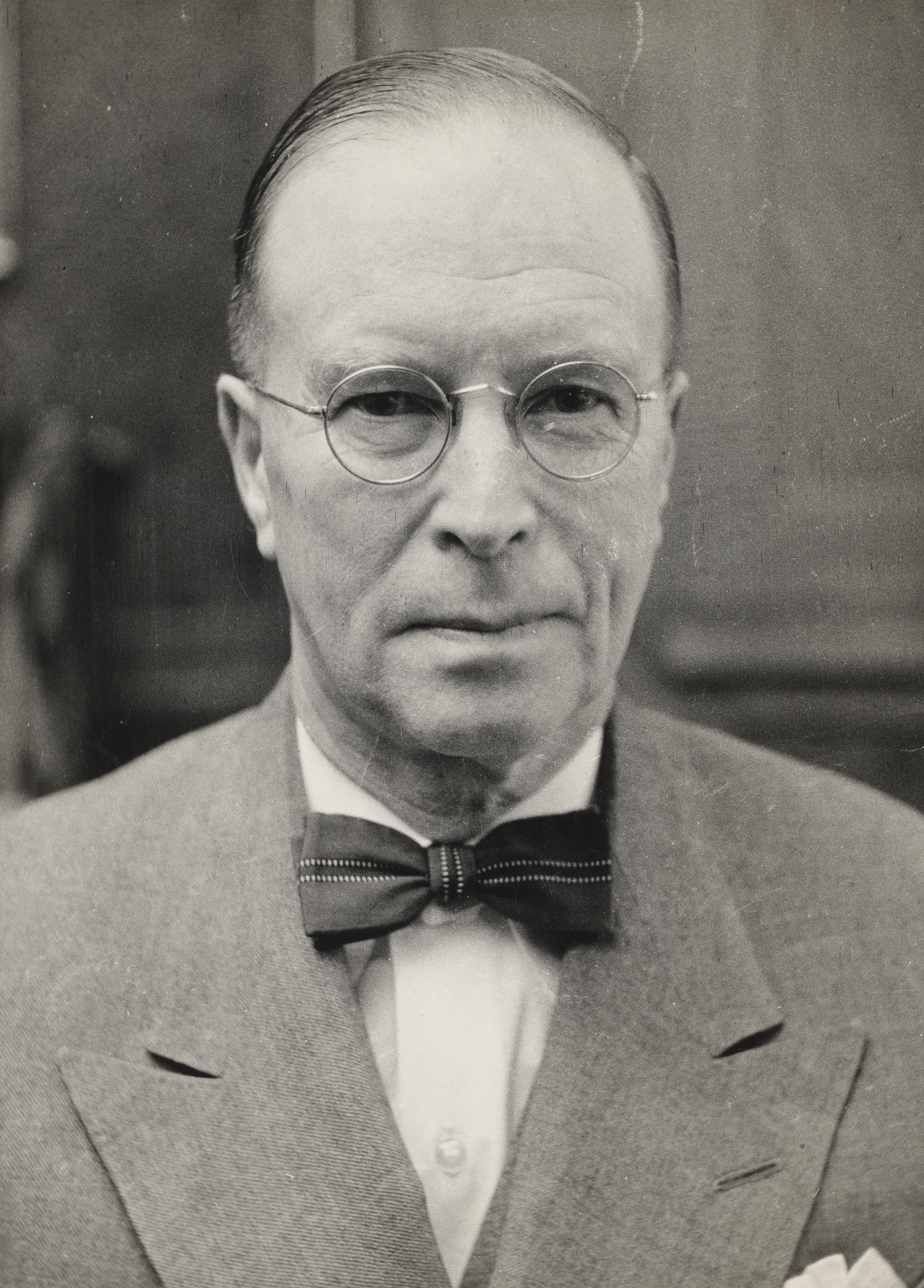
- Date formed: 29 November 1957
- Date dissolved: 26 April 1958

People and organisations
- Prime Minister: Rainer von Fieandt
- Status in legislature: Caretaker government

History
- Predecessor: Sukselainen I
- Successor: Kuuskoski

Rainer von Fieandt's cabinet was the 42nd government of Republic of Finland. Cabinet's time period was from November 29, 1957 to April 26, 1958. It was a caretaker government. The Cabinet fell by interpellation of the opposition, and as of 2021 the last Finnish government to do so.

Assembly
Minister	Period of office	Party
Prime Minister; Rainer von Fieandt	November 29, 1957 – April 26, 1958	Independent
Minister of Foreign Affairs; Paavo Hynninen	November 29, 1957 – April 26, 1958	Independent
Minister of Justice Kurt Kaira	November 29, 1957 – April 26, 1958	Independent
Minister of Defence Kalle Lehmus	November 29, 1957 – April 26, 1958	Independent
Minister of the Interior Urho Kiukas	November 29, 1957 – April 26, 1958	Independent
Minister of Finance Lauri Hietanen	November 29, 1957 – April 26, 1958	Independent
Minister of Education; Reino Oittinen	November 29, 1957 – April 26, 1958	Independent
Minister of Agriculture; Hans Perttula	November 29, 1957 – April 26, 1958	Independent
Minister of Transport and Public Works; Aku Sumu; Paavo Kastari	November 29, 1957 – February 28, 1958; February 28, 1958 – April 26, 1958	Independent; Independent
Deputy Minister of Transport and Public Works; Paavo Kastari Erkki Lindfors	November 29, 1957 – February 28, 1958; February 28, 1958 – April 26, 1958	Independent; Independent
Minister of Trade and Industry; Lauri Kivekäs	November 29, 1957 – April 26, 1958	Independent
Minister of Social Affairs Heikki Waris	November 29, 1957 – April 26, 1958	Independent
Deputy Minister of Social Affairs; Erkki Lindfors	November 29, 1957 – April 26, 1958	Independent

Preceded by Vieno Johannes Sukselainen's first cabinet	Cabinet of Finland; November 29, 1957–April 26, 1958	Succeeded by Reino Kuuskoski's cabinet
