= Marja Lahti =

Finnish politician (1901–1967)

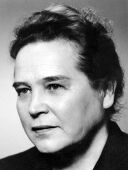
- Born: December 3, 1901; Kymi
- Died: April 19, 1967 (aged 65); Helsinki
- Occupation: Politician
- Years active: 1954 – 1967

Ida Maria Marja Lahti (3 December 1901, Kymi – 19 April 1967) was a Finnish politician who served as Deputy Minister of Agriculture in the Virolainen Cabinet.

Lahti worked for a small farmers' federation in her local area, before being elected to the Parliament of Finland for the Agrarian League at the 1954 general election. She remained a member until her death. In parliament she served on the Economic Committee, the Grand Committee and the Banking Committee. From 1964 to 1966 she served as second minister of Agriculture in the cabinet of Johannes Virolainen.
