= Ministry of Defence (Finland) =

Government ministry of Finland

- Finnish: puolustusministeriö Swedish: försvarsministeriet
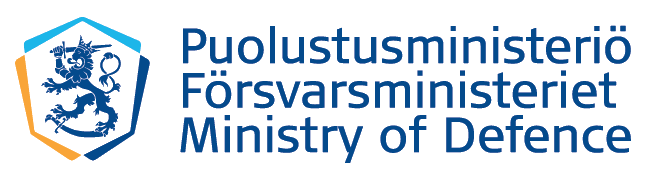

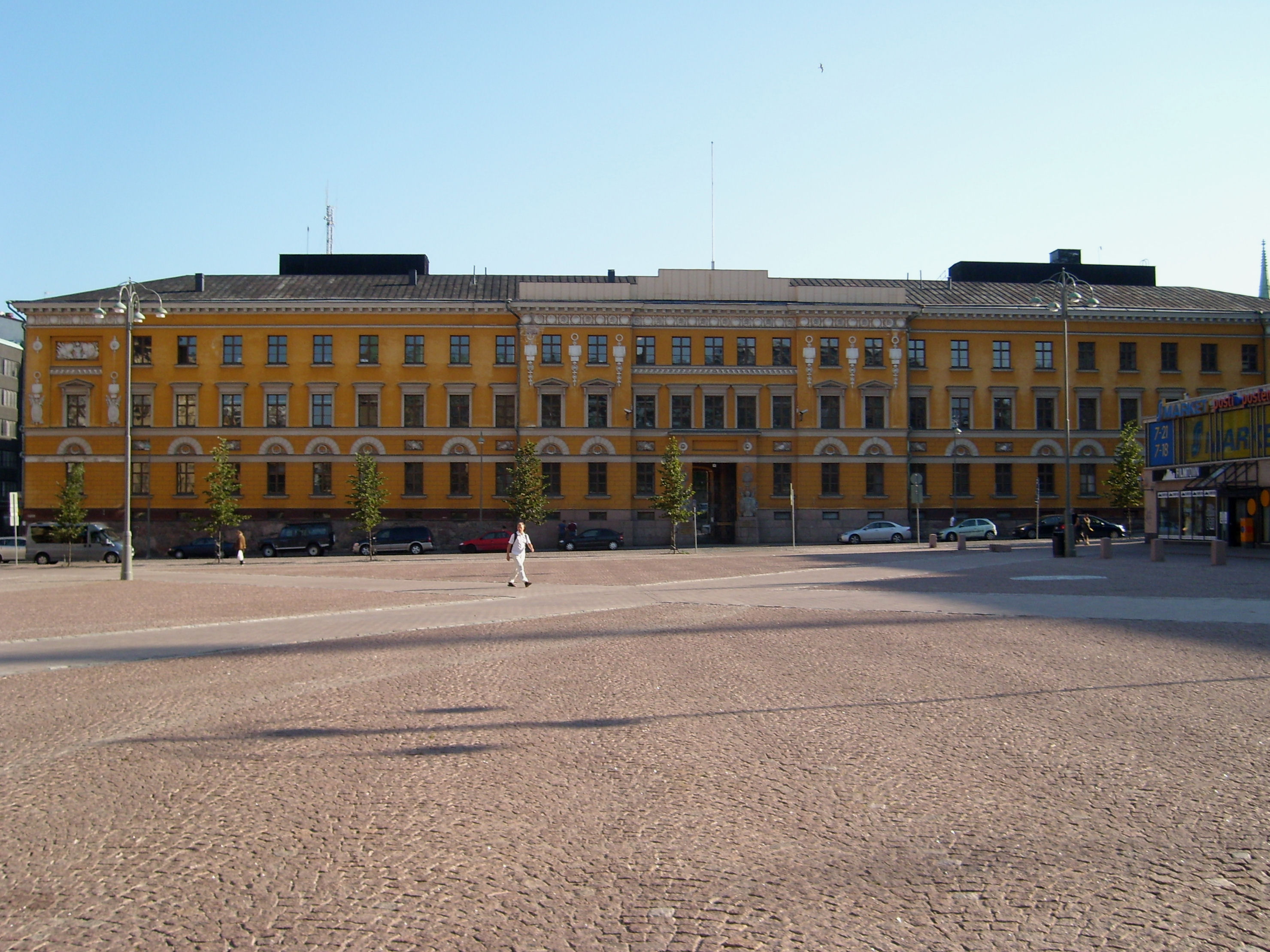
- Kaartin kasarmi, the headquarters of the Ministry of Defence

Ministry overview
- Formed: 14 June 1918 (as the War Department)
- Jurisdiction: Finnish Government
- Headquarters: Eteläinen Makasiinikatu 8, Helsinki
- Annual budget: €5.1 billion (2022)
- Minister responsible: Antti Häkkänen, Minister of Defence
- Ministry executive: Jukka Juusti, Permanent Secretary
- Website: www.defmin.fi/en

The Ministry of Defence (Finnish: puolustusministeriö [ˈpuo̯lustusˌministeriø], Swedish: försvarsministeriet) is one of the 12 ministries which comprise the Finnish Government. The ministry is in charge of Finland's national defence policy, national security, and international cooperation in defence policy matters. It is Finland's ministry of defence. The ministry is headed by the Minister of Defence.

The Ministry of Defence's budget for 2018 is €2,871,971,000. As of 2016, roughly 25% of the defence budget was spent in payroll of the defence forces, 20% in procurement of material and 25% in other operational expenses.
