= Antti Kaikkonen =

Finnish politician (born 1974)

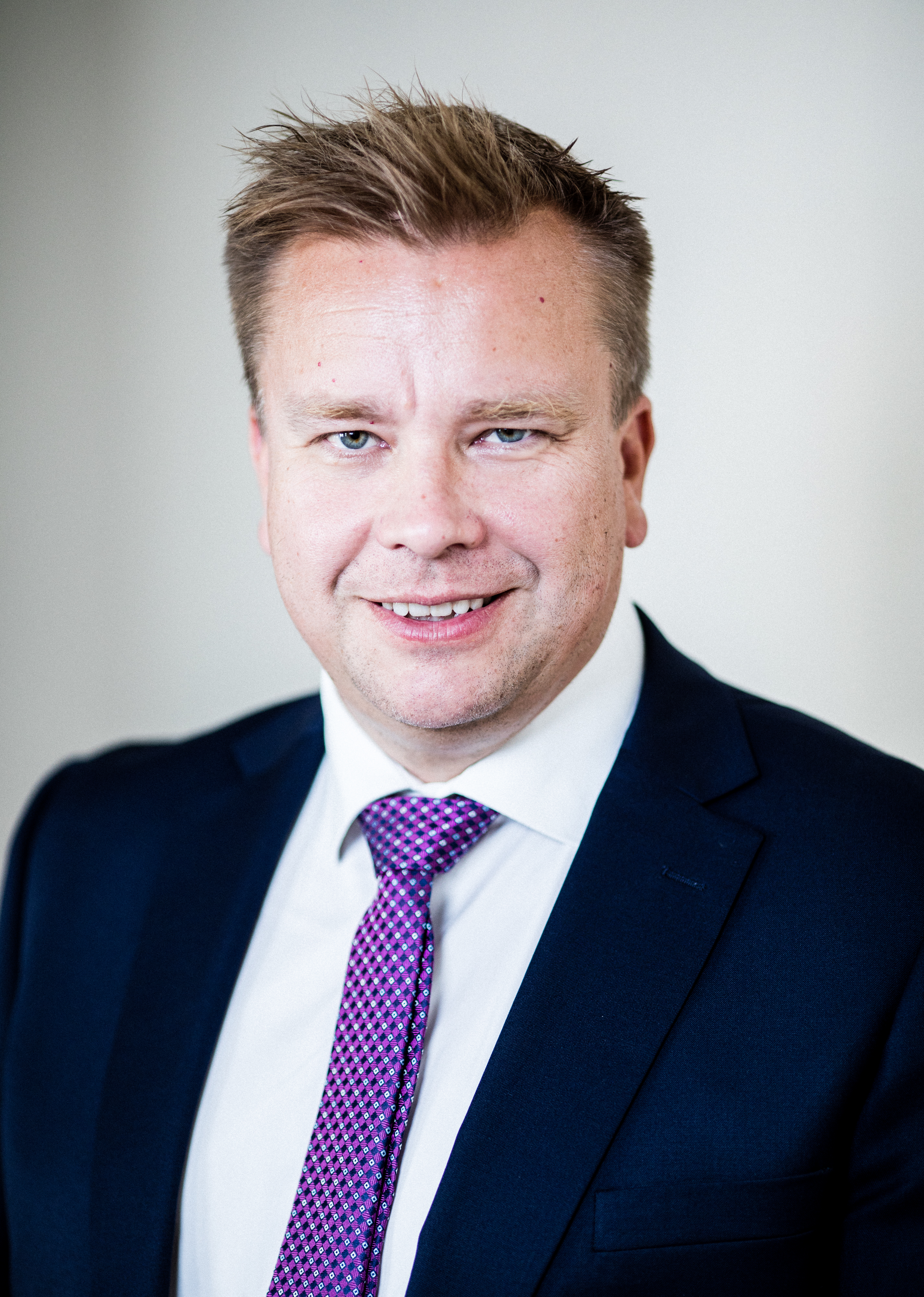
- Kaikkonen in 2019.

Minister of Defence
- In office 28 February – 20 June 2023
- Prime Minister: Sanna Marin
- Preceded by: Mikko Savola
- Succeeded by: Antti Häkkänen
- In office 6 June 2019 – 5 January 2023
- Prime Minister: Antti Rinne; Sanna Marin
- Preceded by: Jussi Niinistö
- Succeeded by: Mikko Savola

Member of the Finnish Parliament for Uusimaa
- Incumbent
- Assumed office 19 March 2003

Leader of the Centre Party
- Incumbent
- Assumed office 15 June 2024
- Preceded by: Annika Saarikko

Personal details
- Born: Antti Samuli Kaikkonen; 14 February 1974 (age 52) Turku, Southwest Finland, Finland
- Party: Centre
- Occupation: Politician

Antti Samuli Kaikkonen (born 14 February 1974) is a Finnish politician who has served as chair of the Centre Party since June 2024. He has been a member of the Finnish Parliament from Uusimaa since 2003. He served as Minister of Defence from 2019 to 2023. Kaikkonen was the president of Finnish Centre Youth from 1997 to 2001. He has also been a member of Finnish Delegation to the Council of Europe since 2004.

In 2013, Kaikkonen was convicted of corruption charges stemming from a campaign financing scandal.

On 21 June 2016, Kaikkonen was chosen as the chairman of the Centre Party's parliamentary group.

By 2019, Kaikkonen was parliamentary head of the coalition-leading Centre Party. Amidst the Oulu child sexual exploitation scandal, he called for all party heads in Parliament to meet, and declared "everyone who comes to Finland has to follow the local laws".

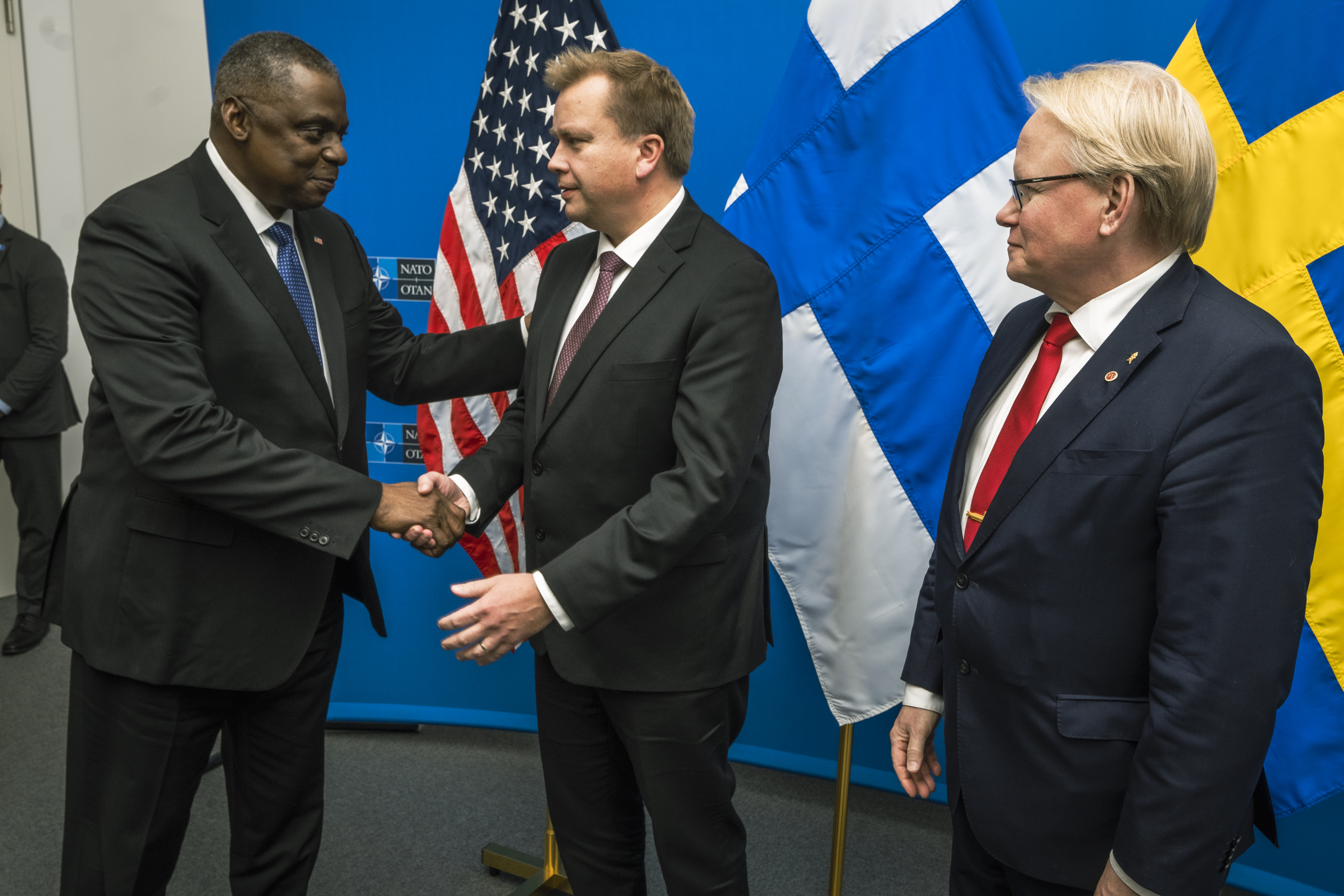
Kaikkonen with U.S. Secretary of Defense Lloyd Austin and Swedish Defence Minister Peter Hultqvist in Brussels, 13 October 2022

== Campaign finance scandal ==
In the autumn of 2009, Kaikkonen received his share of the campaign finance. At that time, it was brought to public, that the Youth Foundation, of which Kaikkonen had been the chairman of the board since 2003, had distributed election support money to Kaikkonen, in municipal-, parliamentary-, and European Parliament -elections. In addition, it had also financed Matti Vanhanen's presidential election campaign, among other things. Kaikkonen resigned from the chairman's place, and then stayed as a member of the board.

The prosecutor demanded Kaikkonen's imprisonment in the Youth Foundation bribery trial, that began on 16 January 2012. In January 2013, the Helsinki District Court sentenced Kaikkonen to five months in conditional discharge for abuse of trust. He did not appeal his verdict.

== Personal life ==
Kaikkonen has two children; Kaikkonen announced that he would take parental leave in early 2023.

== Honours ==
- Order of the Cross of Liberty (Finland, 2022)
- Order of the White Rose of Finland (Finland, 2022)
- Cross of Merit of the War Invalides (Finland, 2021)
- Military merit medal (Finland, 2020)
- Royal Order of the Polar Star (Sweden, 2022)

Political offices
Preceded by Jussi Niinistö	Minister of Defence; 2019–2023	Succeeded by Mikko Savola
Preceded by Mikko Savola	Minister of Defence; 2023	Succeeded by Antti Häkkänen
