= Olli J. Uoti =

Finnish politician

Olli Johannes Uoti (12 February 1930 - 13 May 1967) was a Finnish social scientist and politician.

Uoti was born in Kalvola. He was at first a member of the Social Democratic Party of Finland and, after 1959, of the Social Democratic Union of Workers and Smallholders. He served as Deputy Minister of Social Affairs in Vieno Johannes Sukselainen's first cabinet (2 September 1957 - 28 November 1957) and as a Member of Parliament (22 July 1958 - 19 February 1962 and 5 April 1966 - 13 May 1967)
