= Klaus Waris =

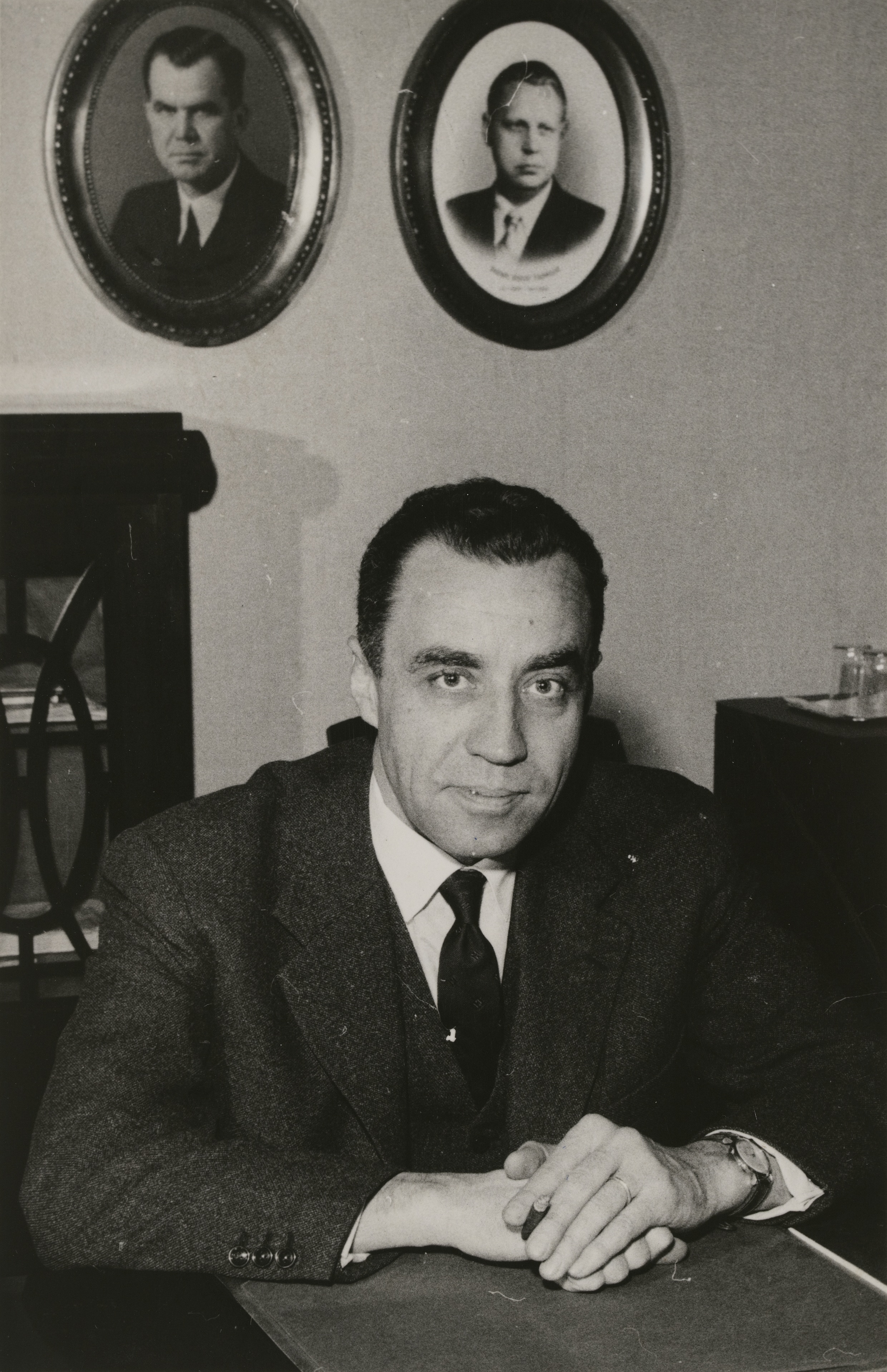
- Klaus Waris in his office in the Bank of Finland

governor of the Bank of Finland
- In office 1957–1967

Personal details
- Born: 17 March 1914 Helsinki
- Died: 18 December 1994 (aged 80)
- Occupation: economist and professor

Klaus Henrik Waris (17 March 1914 – 18 December 1994) was a Finnish economist, professor and the governor of the Bank of Finland from 1957 to 1967.

Waris was born in Helsinki. He graduated in 1935 from University of Turku. Waris worked as the head of the Department of National Economy at the Ministry of Finance from 1946 to 1949. From 1949 to 1952, Waris was professor of economics at the Helsinki University of Technology, and was a member of the executive board of the bank Yhdyspankki from 1950 to 1951.

From 1952 to 1957, Waris was a member of the executive board of the Bank of Finland, and from 1957 to 1967 the governor of the bank. When Waris began his term as governor, his first task was to defend the value of the devalued Finnish mark in the situation after the 1956 general strike. In 1961, however, Finnish markka had to be devalued again. Waris resigned from the central bank in 1967. Devaluations facilitated exports and foreign loans were used to develop the Finnish forest industry and improve Finland's road network. Unemployment was low during the Waris period, living standards improved and Finland urbanized.

After a career in banking, Waris served as the chancellor of the Helsinki School of Economics from 1967 to 1980 and as the first executive of Sitra from 1968 to 1972.

Government offices
Preceded by Rainer von Fieandt	Governor of the Bank of Finland; 1957-1968	Succeeded by Mauno Koivisto
