= Wilhelm Alexander Thesleff =

Finnish politician (1880–1941)

Wilhelm Aleksander Thesleff
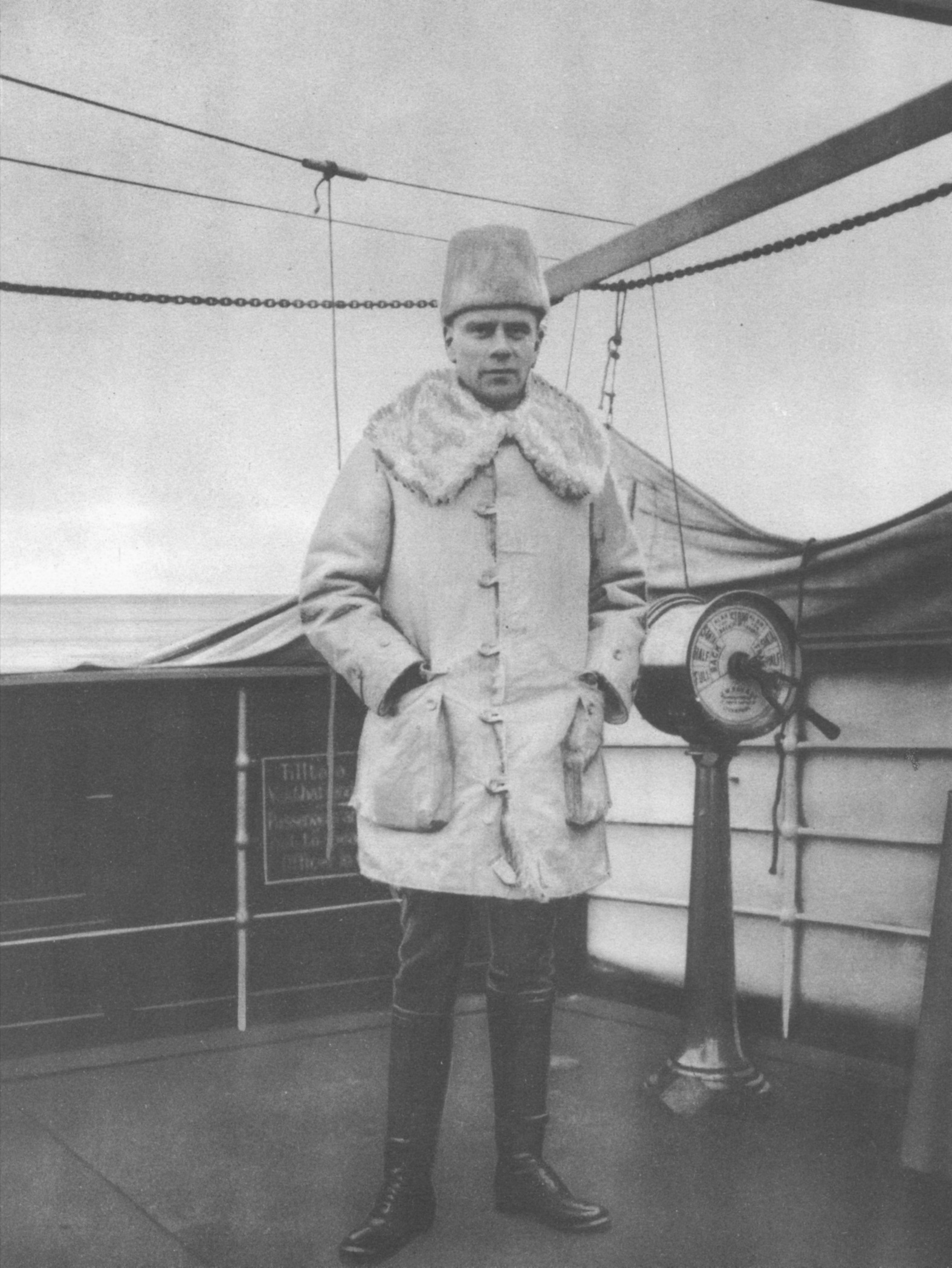
- Wilhelm Thesleff in 1918
- Born: 27 July 1880; Viipurin maalaiskunta, Grand Duchy of Finland, Russian Empire
- Died: 26 March 1941 (aged 60); Helsinki, Finland
- Education: General Staff Academy (Russian Empire)
- Occupations: Solder, Politician

Wilhelm Aleksander Thesleff (27 July 1880, Viipurin maalaiskunta, Grand Duchy of Finland – 26 March 1941, Helsinki) was a Finnish general, first Minister of Defence of Finland and briefly the commander in chief of the Finnish army.

Thesleff began a military career in 1894 Hamina Cadet School from which he graduated in 1901.

He continued his military studies in St Petersburg, Nicholas General Staff Academy from 1904 to 1907, and the Officers Cavalry School from 1910 to 1911. He was promoted to the rank of lieutenant-colonel on 12 June 1912.

Thesleff served in the Imperial Russian Army during World War I from 1914 to 1917, until he was taken prisoner by the Germans in Riga in September 1917.

In October 1917 he was transferred by request of the military committee to serve as a liaison officer between the Finnish Jäger battalion fighting under the German command and the Germans.

He deposed the unpopular Colonel Nikolai Mexmontan. He was commander of the 27th Jäger Battalion from 6 November 1917 until 25 February 1918.

In March 1918 he was appointed as a liaison officer with the Baltic Sea Division during the Finnish Civil War.

After the Finnish Civil War, Thesleff became the War Minister, 27 May 1918 – 27 November 1918 in the first cabinet of Juho Kusti Paasikivi.

He was promoted to the rank of Major General, 14 June 1918. After the resignation of Major General Wilkman, as a war minister, Thesleff became commander in chief of the Finnish military forces on 13 August 1918.

Paasikivi cabinet had been leaning towards Imperial Germany. When Germany was defeated in the First World War the cabinet resigned. This also meant the end of Thesleff's political career.
