= Sukselainen I cabinet =

Sukselainen I Cabinet
- 41st Cabinet of Finland
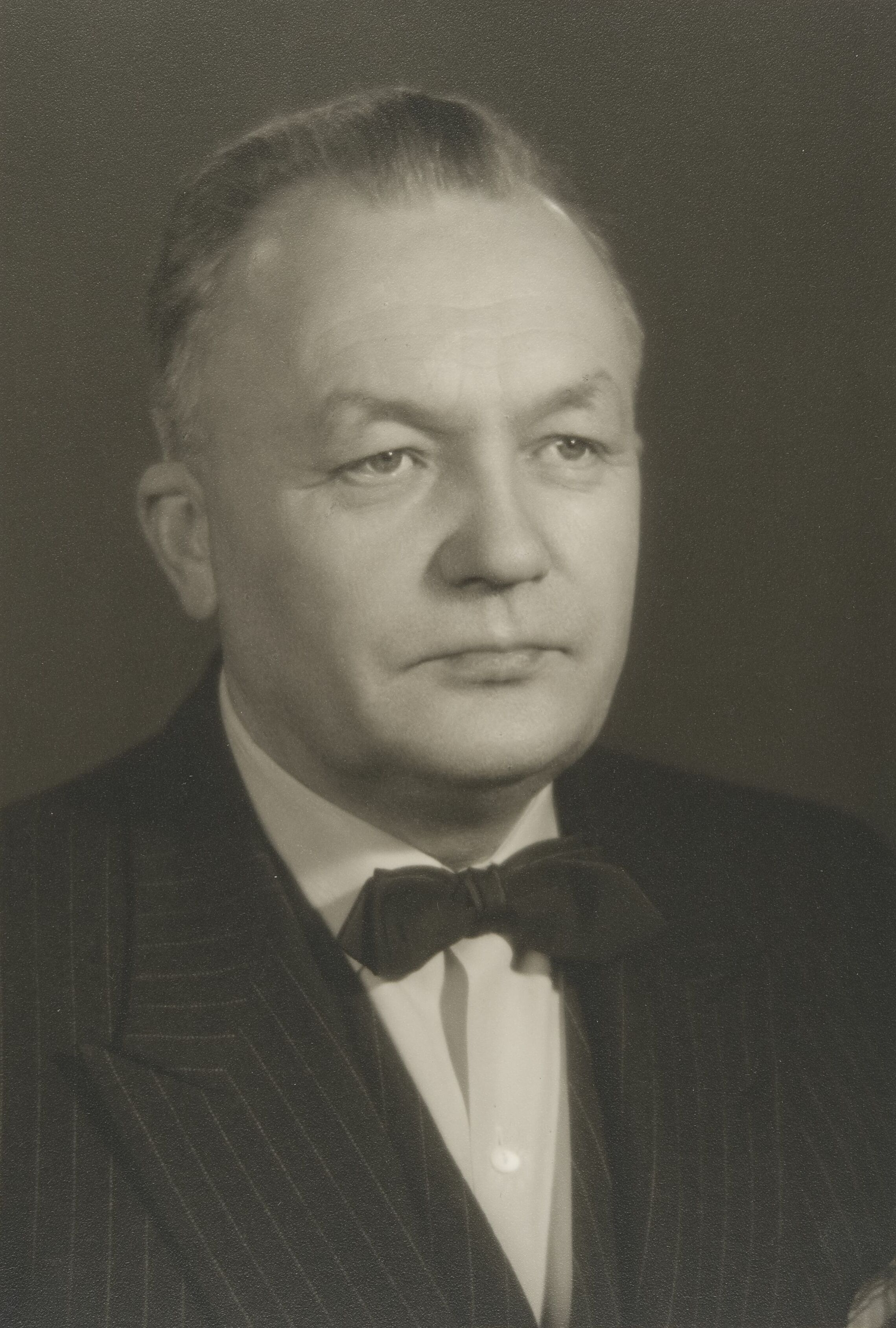
- Date formed: 27 May 1957
- Date dissolved: 29 November 1957

People and organisations
- Prime Minister: V. J. Sukselainen
- Member parties: Agrarian League; RKP; People's Party; Liberal People's Party
- Status in legislature: Minority government

History
- Predecessor: Fagerholm II
- Successor: Von Fieandt

Vieno Johannes Sukselainen's first cabinet was the 41st government of Republic of Finland. This Cabinet's time period was from May 27, 1957, to November 29, 1957. It was a minority government.

Assembly
Minister	Period of office	Party
Prime Minister; Vieno Johannes Sukselainen	May 27, 1957 – November 29, 1957	Agrarian League
Minister of Foreign Affairs; Johannes Virolainen	May 27, 1957 – November 29, 1957	Agrarian League
Minister of Justice; Arvo Helminen; Johan Otto Söderhjelm	May 27, 1957 – September 2, 1957; September 2, 1957 – November 29, 1957	Independent; Independent
Minister of Defence; Atte Pakkanen; Pekka Malinen	May 27, 1957 – September 2, 1957; September 2, 1957 – November 29, 1957	Agrarian League; People's Party
Minister of the Interior; Harras Kyttä; Teuvo Aura	May 27, 1957 – September 2, 1957; September 2, 1957 – November 29, 1957	People's Party; People's Party
Minister of Finance; Nils Meinander; Martti Miettunen	May 27, 1957 – June 2, 1957; June 2, 1957 – November 29, 1957	Agrarian League; Swedish People's Party; Agrarian League
Deputy Minister of Finance; Wiljam Sarjala; Ahti Karjalainen; Pekka Malinen; Teuvo Aura	May 27, 1957 – June 2, 1957; June 2, 1957 – September 2, 1957; September 2, 1957 – November 29, 1957; October 11, 1957 – November 29, 1957	Agrarian League; Agrarian League; People's Party; People's Party
Minister of Education; Kerttu Saalasti	May 27, 1957 – November 29, 1957	Agrarian League
Minister of Agriculture; Martti Miettunen; Kusti Eskola	May 27, 1957 – July 2, 1957; July 2, 1957 – November 29, 1957	Agrarian League; Agrarian League
Deputy Minister of Agriculture; Bertel Lindh; Matti Lepistö	May 27, 1957 – July 2, 1957; September 2, 1957 – November 29, 1957	Swedish People's Party; Social Democratic Union of Workers and Smallholders
Minister of Transport and Public Works; Kusti Eskola; Wiljam Sarjala	May 27, 1957 – July 2, 1957; July 2, 1957 – November 29, 1957	Agrarian League; Agrarian League
Deputy Minister of Transport and Public Works; Torsten Nordström; Kustaa Tiitu; Valdemar Liljeström	May 27, 1957 – June 2, 1957; June 2, 1957 – September 2, 1957; September 2, 1957 – November 29, 1957; October 11, 1957 – November 29, 1957	Swedish People's Party; Agrarian League; Social Democratic Union of Workers and Smallholders
Minister of Trade and Industry; Esa Kaitila	May 27, 1957 – November 29, 1957	People's Party
Deputy Minister of Trade and Industry; Teuvo Aura	September 2, 1957 – November 29, 1957	People's Party
Minister of Social Affairs; Irma Karvikko; Aino Malkamäki	May 27, 1957 – September 2, 1957; September 2, 1957 – November 29, 1957	People's Party; Social Democratic Union of Workers and Smallholders
Deputy Minister of Social Affairs; Atte Pakkanen; Pekka Malinen; Olli J. Uoti	May 27, 1957 – June 2, 1957; June 2, 1957 – September 2, 1957; July 2, 1957 – September 2, 1957; October 11, 1957 – November 29, 1957	Agrarian League; People's Party; Social Democratic Union of Workers and Smallholders
Minister without Portfolio; Aarre Simonen	September 2, 1957 – November 29, 1957	Social Democratic Union of Workers and Smallholders

Preceded by Fagerholm II	Cabinet of Finland; May 27, 1957 – November 29, 1957	Succeeded by Von Fieandt
