= Virolainen cabinet =

49th government of Finland

Virolainen Cabinet
- 49th Cabinet of Finland
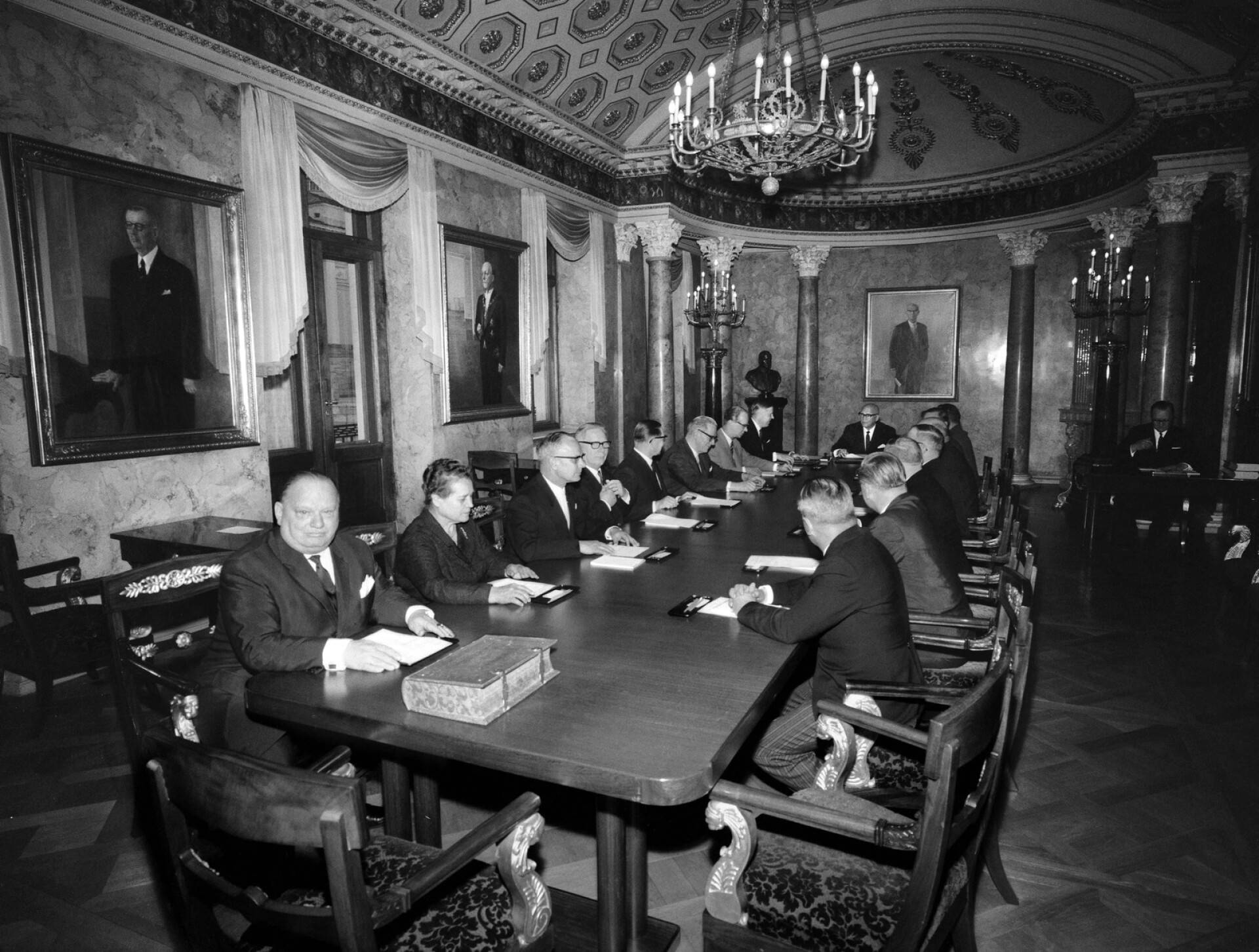
- Johannes Virolainen's cabinet meets under the leadership of President Urho Kekkonen in 1964
- Date formed: 12 September 1964
- Date dissolved: 27 May 1966

People and organisations
- Prime Minister: Johannes Virolainen
- Total no. of members: 15
- Member parties: Agrarian League (renamed to Centre Party after 1965); National Coalition; People's Party; RKP
- Status in legislature: Majority government

History
- Predecessor: Lehto
- Successor: Paasio I

The Virolainen cabinet was the 49th government of Finland. The cabinet existed from 12 September 1964 to 27 May 1966. It was a majority government whose Prime Minister was Johannes Virolainen. It was preceded by the Lehto cabinet.

Virolainen's cabinet made many political reforms. It instituted the purchase tax law, the new language law, the development area law and founded universities in the eastern and northern parts of the country. The cabinet had economical problems and had to raise both the road and fuel taxes.

Assembly
Minister	Period of office	Party
Prime Minister; Johannes Virolainen; Ahti Karjalainen, deputy	September 12, 1964 – May 27, 1966; September 12, 1964 – May 27, 1966	Agrarian League/Centre Party; Agrarian League/Centre Party
Minister of Foreign Affairs; Ahti Karjalainen	September 12, 1964 – May 27, 1966	Agrarian League/Centre Party
Minister of Justice; Johan Otto Söderhjelm	September 12, 1964 – May 27, 1966	Swedish People's Party
Minister of Defence; Arvo Pentti	September 12, 1964 – May 27, 1966	Agrarian League/Centre Party
Minister of the Interior; Niilo Ryhtä	September 12, 1964 – May 27, 1966	Agrarian League/Centre Party
Minister of Finance; Esa Kaitila	September 12, 1964 – May 27, 1966	People's Party
Deputy Minister of Finance; Erkki Huurtamo	September 12, 1964 – May 27, 1966	National Coalition Party
Minister of Education; Jussi Saukkonen	September 12, 1964 – May 27, 1966	National Coalition Party
Minister of Agriculture; Mauno Jussila	September 12, 1964 – May 27, 1966	Agrarian League/Centre Party
Deputy Minister of Agriculture; Marja Lahti	September 12, 1964 – May 27, 1966	Agrarian League/Centre Party
Minister of Transport and Public Works; Grels Teir	September 12, 1964 – May 27, 1966	Swedish People's Party
Deputy Minister of Transport and Public Works; Esa Timonen	September 12, 1964 – May 27, 1966	Agrarian League/Centre Party
Minister of Trade and Industry; Toivo Wiherheimo	September 12, 1964 – May 27, 1966	National Coalition Party
Minister of Social Affairs; Juho Tenhiälä	September 12, 1964 – May 27, 1966	People's Party
Deputy Minister of Social Affairs; Kaarle Sorkio	September 12, 1964 – May 27, 1966	Independent

Preceded by Reino Lehto's cabinet	Cabinet of Finland; September 12, 1964 – May 27, 1966	Succeeded by Rafael Paasio's first cabinet

== Sources ==
- Governments and Ministers since 1917 / No. 49. Virolainen. Finnish Government.
