= Pekka Malinen =

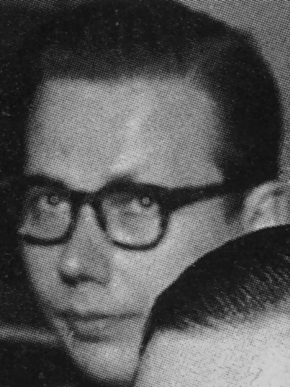
Pekka Malinen in 1957

Pekka Kullervo Malinen (11 June 1921 Viipuri – 21 September 2004) was Ambassador and Minister and Diplomat. He served as the party secretary of the Finnish People's Party in the 1950s. Male's parents were the farmer Esko Malinen and his wife Hilda Junttu. During the Second World War, Malinen served in the Waffen-SS volunteer battalion recruited by Nazi Germany as an SS-Unterscharführer.

He graduated in Political Science in 1948. Malinen served as Agent for Oulu Chamber of Commerce in 1949-1950, Oulu Newspaper Kaleva 2nd Editor in 1950-1952 and Party Secretary for Finnish People's Party 1952-1960.

Malinen, who represented the Finnish People's Party, was in Sukselainen I government in 1957 as a second Minister of Social Affairs until September 2, 1957, and then as Minister of Defence and second Minister of Finance.

After leaving politics Malinen moved to the Ministry for Foreign Affairs in the 1960s. He was the consul of Finland in Gdynia, Poland from 1960 to 1961, as commercial secretary of the Embassy of Finland in 1961-1965, as Head of Division in the Ministry of Foreign Affairs from 1965 to 1967 and Embassy Counselor in Washington, 1967-1969. Malinen was Director of the Development Cooperation Department of the Ministry for Foreign Affairs and Ambassador in five countries: in Egypt and in Syria from 1969 to 1974, Permanent Representative of Finland to the OECD in Paris 1978-1983, Algeria and Tunisia from 1983 to 1985 and the last post in Portugal from 1985 to 1988.

In August 1989, Malinen, retired, raised the debate with a report entitled "Kehitysapu täysremonttiin". He criticized the Finnish development aid at that time for producing low development results in target countries compared to the money spent. Mr Malinen suggested concentrating aid on large projects in countries where economic growth was possible and leaving the actual "poor" aid to NGOs. Likewise, mitigation of population growth should have been regarded as a priority by Malinen.
