= Kaarlo Leinonen =

Finnish general and Minister of Defence (1914–1975)

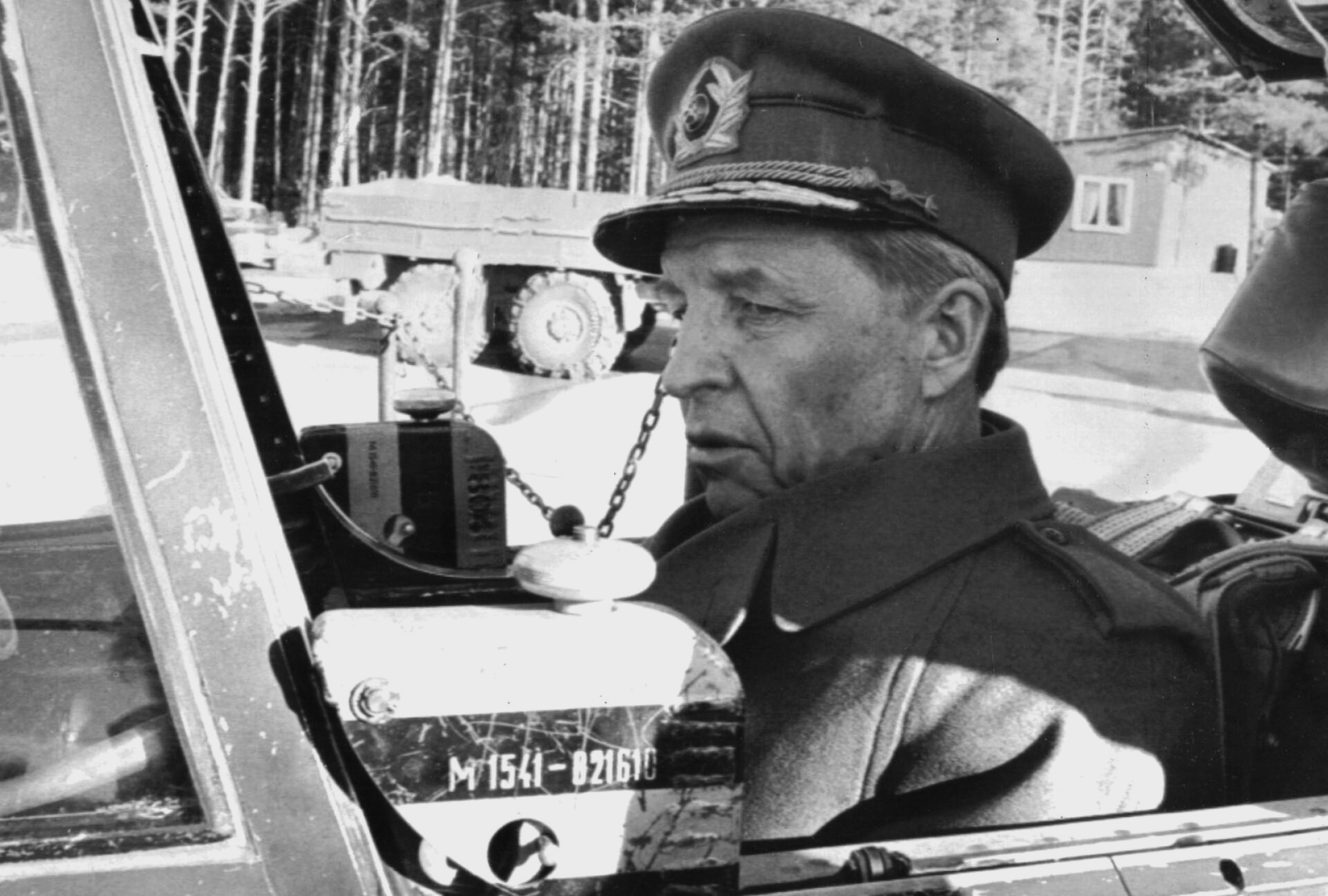
General Kaarlo Leinonen during his visit to Sweden in 1972.

Kaarlo Olavi Leinonen (15 March 1914 – 19 April 1975) was a Finnish general and Minister of Defence from December 1963 to September 1964. He was the Chief of Defence of the Finnish Defence Forces between 1969 and 1974. Leinonen was born in Tervola. He died in Karjalohja.

Military offices
| Preceded by General Yrjö Keinonen | Chief of Defence; 1969–1974 | Succeeded by General Lauri Sutela |
