= Rainer von Fieandt =

Prime minister of Finland from 1957 to 1958

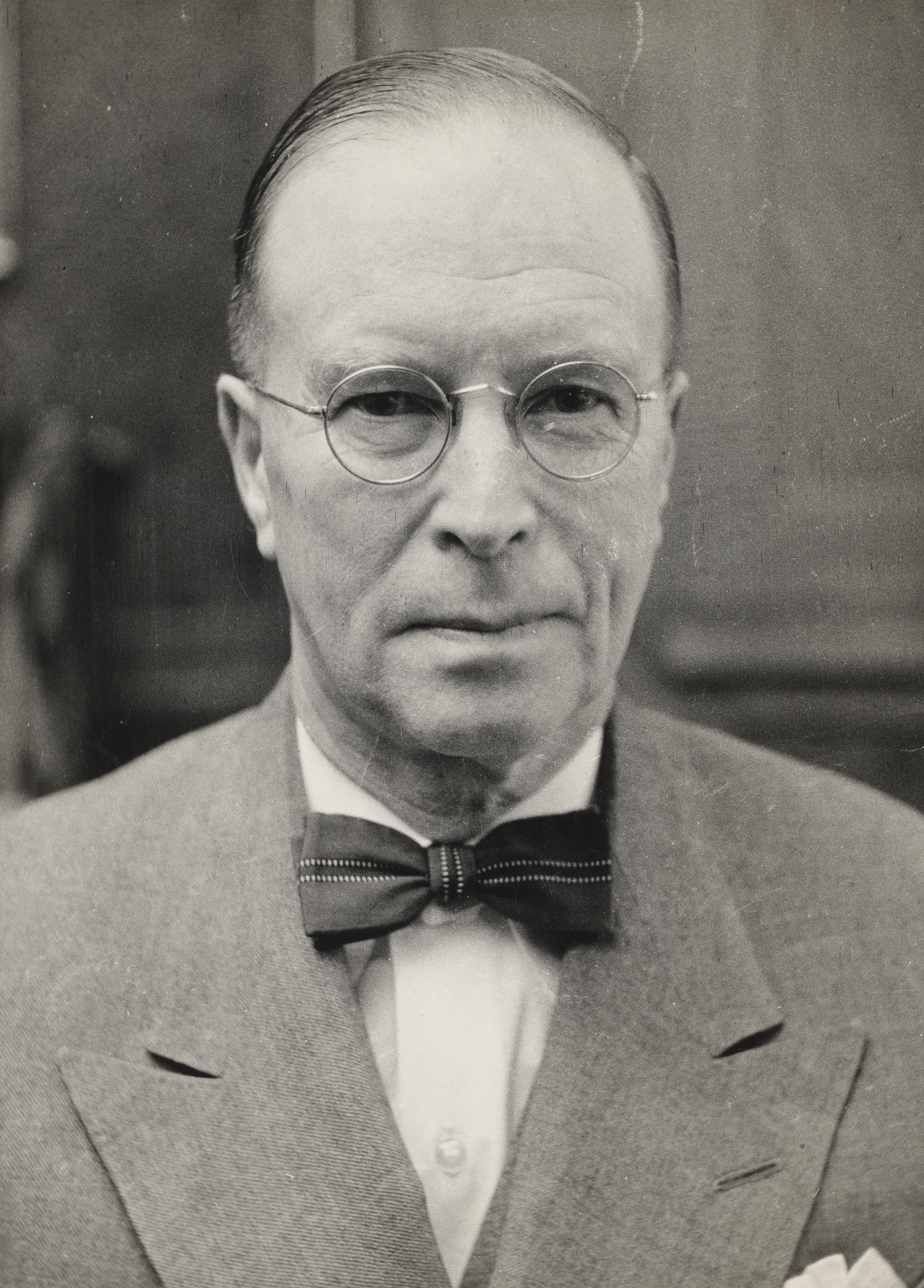
- von Fieandt in 1958.

25th Prime Minister of Finland
- In office 29 November 1957 – 26 April 1958
- President: Urho Kekkonen
- Deputy: Reino Oittinen
- Preceded by: V. J. Sukselainen
- Succeeded by: Reino Kuuskoski

Personal details
- Born: 26 December 1890 Turku
- Died: 28 April 1972 (aged 81) Helsinki
- Spouse: Vera Strahoff (1920–)

Berndt Rainer von Fieandt (26 December 1890 – 28 April 1972) was a Finnish banker and official without party affiliation. He was appointed as the Governor of the Bank of Finland in 1955 before being appointed by the President to form a cabinet. He served as the Prime Minister of Finland in 1957 and 1958.

== Cabinets ==
- Von Fieandt Cabinet
- Suomen Yhdyspankki

Government offices
| Preceded by Sakari Tuomioja | Governor of the Bank of Finland; 1955–1957 | Succeeded by Klaus Waris |
Political offices
| Preceded by V. J. Sukselainen | Prime Minister of Finland; 1957–1958 | Succeeded by Reino Kuuskoski |
