= Aarne Nuorvala =

Finnish politician (1912–2013)

Aarne Johannes Nuorvala (18 April 1912, Viipuri – 11 July 2013) was a Finnish official, and a nonpartisan minister, and deputy prime minister, in the Lehto Cabinet 1963-1964.

He worked in the Supreme Administrative Court of Finland 1957-1964, and as the Chancellor of Justice 1964-1965. Then he was appointed as the President of Supreme Administrative Court of Finland. He retired in 1982.
