= Magnus Kull =

Finnish politician (1924–1973)

Magnus Ingmar Kull (12 April 1924 – 14 January 2016) was a Finnish politician, born in Korsholm. He was a member of the Parliament of Finland from 1966 to 1970, representing the Swedish People's Party of Finland. He served as Deputy Minister of Social Affairs from 18 December 1963 to 12 September 1964. He was a presidential elector in the 1968 Finnish presidential election.
