= Pauli Lehtosalo =

Finnish jurist and politician (1910–1989)

Pauli Lehtosalo (18 December 1910 – 12 March 1989) was a Finnish jurist and politician, born in Vehkalahti. He was a member of the Agrarian League, which changed its name to Centre Party in 1965. He served as Minister of Agriculture from 26 April to 29 August 1958, as Deputy Minister of Finance from 13 January 1959 to 14 April 1961, as Deputy Minister of Trade and Industry from 29 September 1959 to 13 April 1962 and as Minister of Justice from 14 April 1961 to 13 April 1962.
