= Edvard Björkenheim =

Finnish farmer and politician (1901–1965)

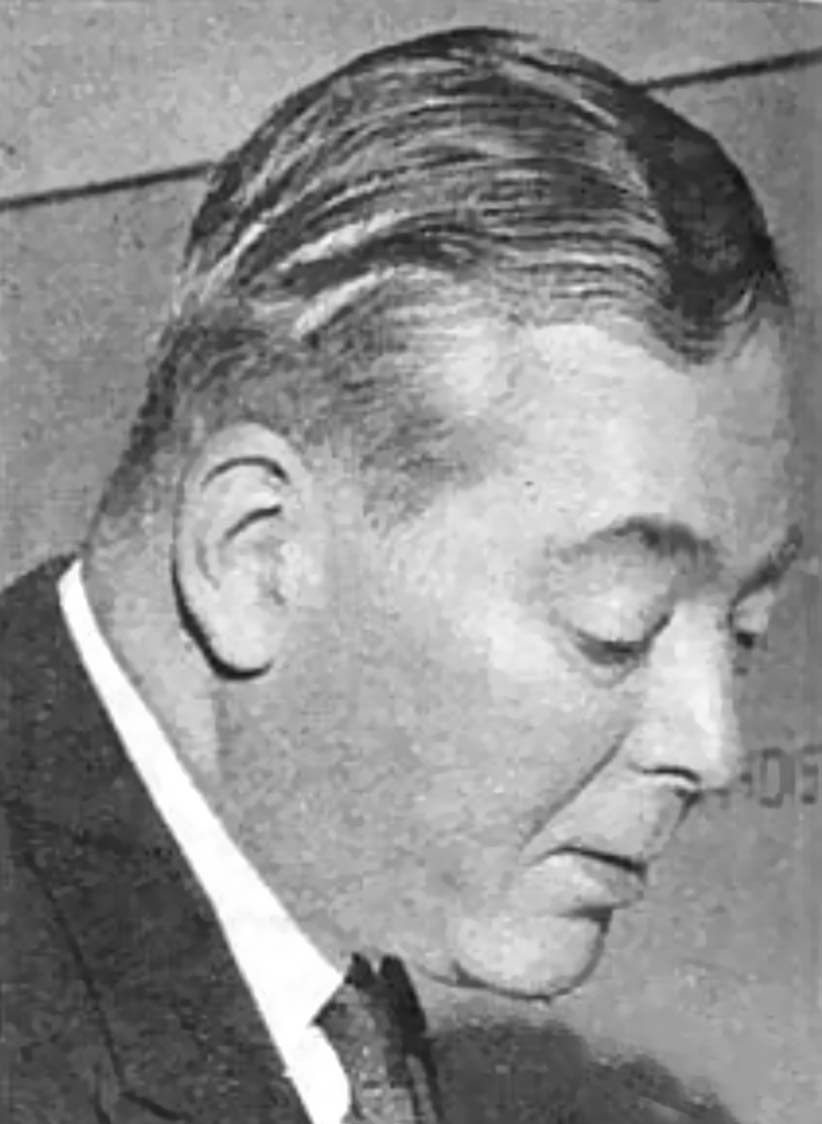
Edvard Björkenheim

Edvard Lars Reguel Björkenheim (26 July 1901 – 24 May 1965) was a Finnish farmer and politician, born in Isokyrö. He was a member of the Agrarian League. He served as Minister of Defence from 26 April to 29 August 1958 and from 14 July 1961 to 13 April 1962. He was the owner of Orisberg Manor at Isokyrö.
