= Heikki Hosia =

Finnish educator and politician (1907–1997)

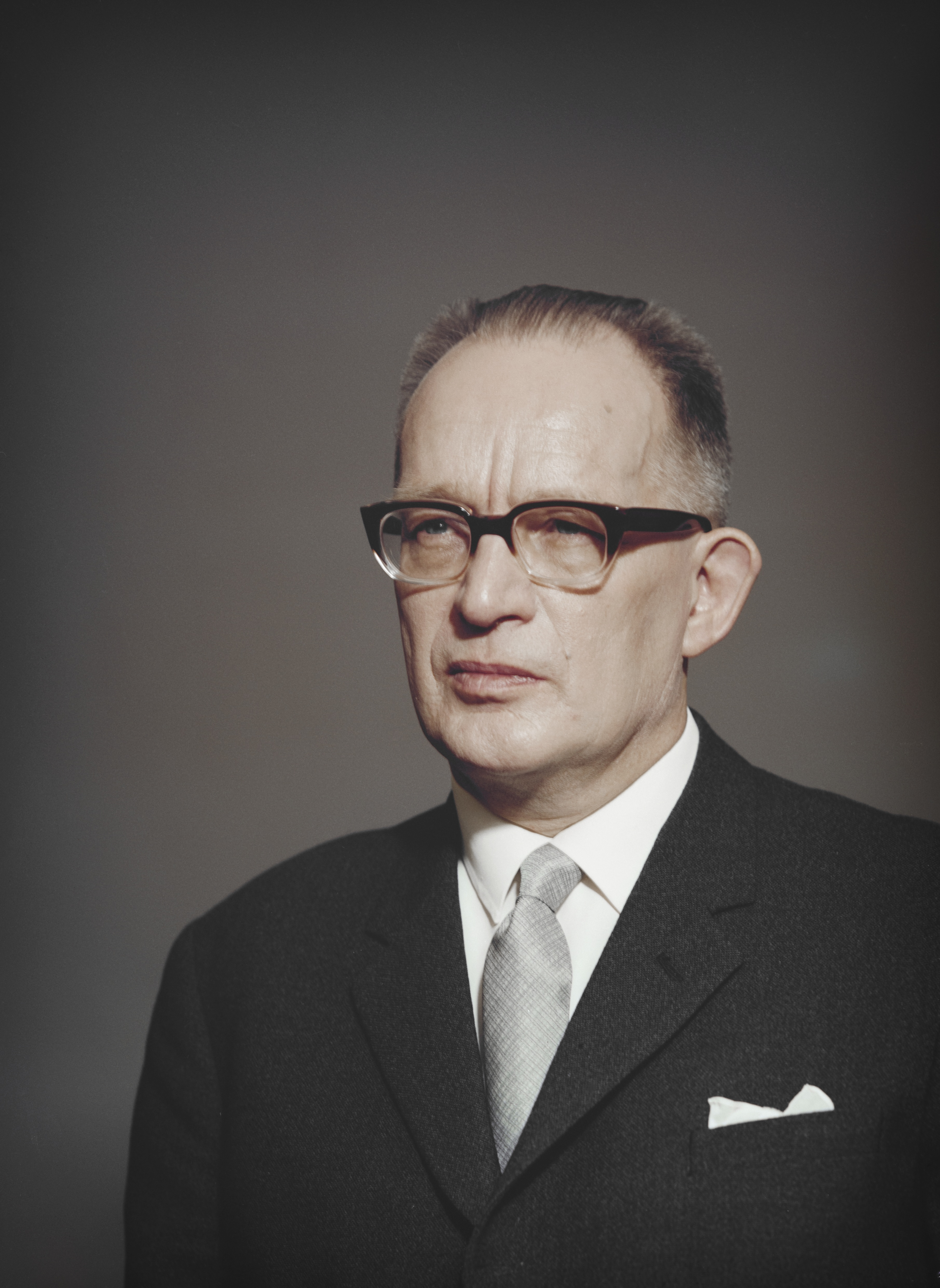
Heikki Hosia in 1967

Heikki Päiviö Hosia (29 November 1907 – 23 March 1997) was a Finnish educator and politician, born in Punkalaidun. He was a member of the Agrarian League. He served as Minister of Education from 13 January 1959 to 13 April 1962. He was the brother-in-law of Armi Hosia, who succeeded him as Minister of Education.
