= Antti Häkkänen =

Finnish politician (born 1985)

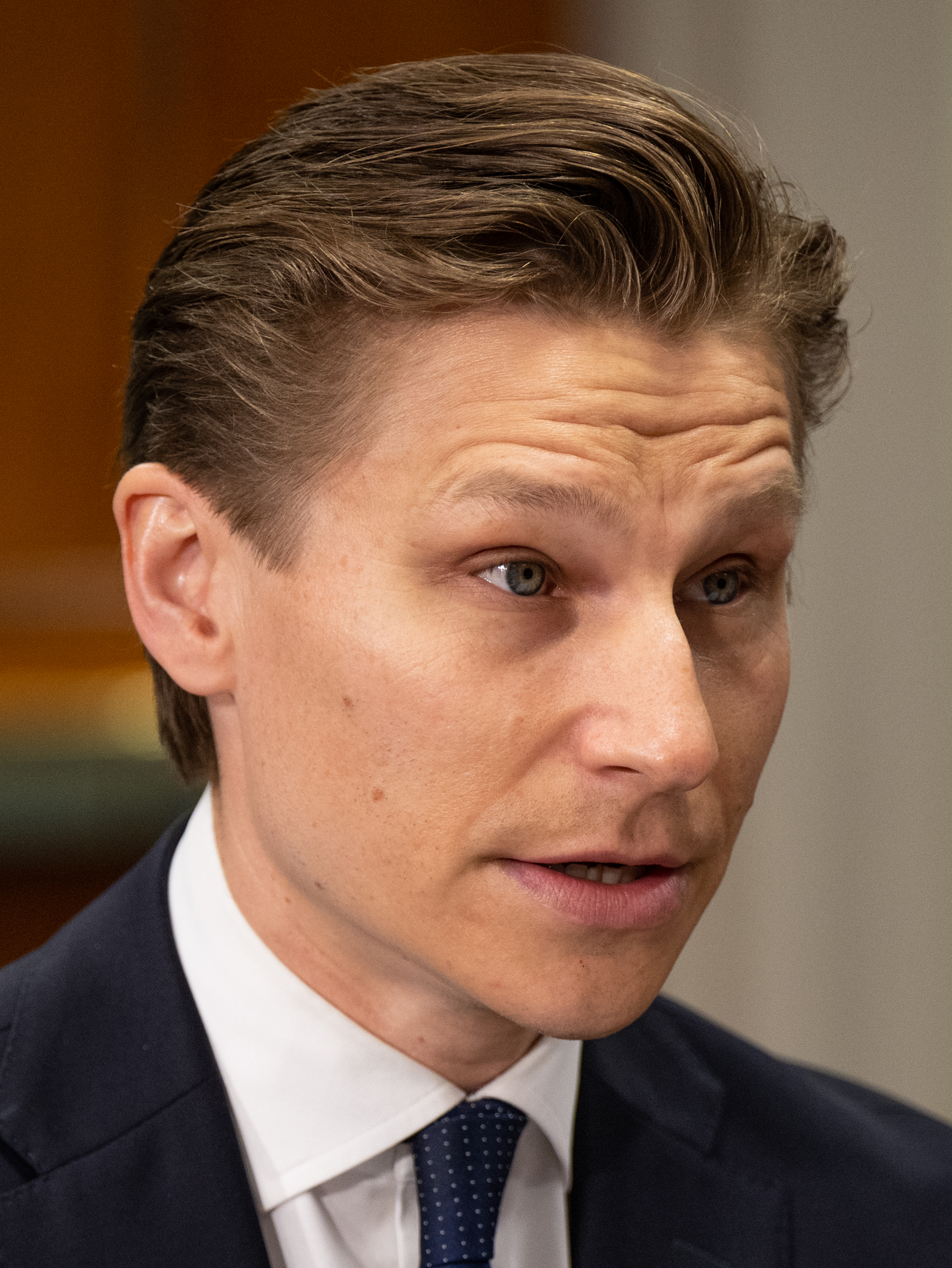
- Häkkänen in 2024

Minister of Defence
- Incumbent
- Assumed office 20 June 2023
- Prime Minister: Petteri Orpo
- Preceded by: Antti Kaikkonen

Minister of Justice
- In office 5 May 2017 – 6 June 2019
- Prime Minister: Juha Sipilä
- Preceded by: Jari Lindström
- Succeeded by: Anna-Maja Henriksson

Member of the Finnish Parliament for South-Eastern Finland
- Incumbent
- Assumed office 22 April 2015

Personal details
- Born: Antti Edvard Häkkänen; 16 January 1985 (age 41) Mäntyharju, Southern Savonia, Finland
- Party: National Coalition
- Spouse: Henna Pajulammi
- Children: 2
- Education: University of Helsinki
- Website: www.anttihakkanen.fi

Antti Edvard Häkkänen (born 16 January 1985) is a Finnish politician from the National Coalition Party. He has served as Minister of Defence since June 2023 in the Orpo cabinet and as Member of Parliament since 2015. Häkkänen served as Minister of Justice in the Sipilä cabinet from 2017 to 2019.

== Career ==
Häkkänen graduated from the University of Helsinki with a Master of Law.

Häkkänen served on the Mäntyharju town council from 2009. He was elected as the Youth National Coalition Party leader in 2011 for the 2012-2013 period.

The National Coalition Party nominated Häkkänen as a candidate for the 2014 European Parliament election but he did not gain enough votes. In the 2015 Finnish parliamentary election he was nominated in the newly formed constituency of South-Eastern Finland, and became an elected MP with 6,212 votes.

Häkkänen was elected as one of three vice-chairmen of the National Coalition Party at the party summit in June 2016, with the highest number of votes.

In June 2023, he was appointed Minister of Defence in the Orpo Cabinet.

In February 2024, Häkkänen declared that he was planning to introduce legislation that would prohibit people from resigning from the Finnish Defence Forces' military reserve, while calling resigning reservists unpatriotic. The announcement led into a surge of resignation applications and the plan was widely criticized as unconstitutional and not in line with international treaties.

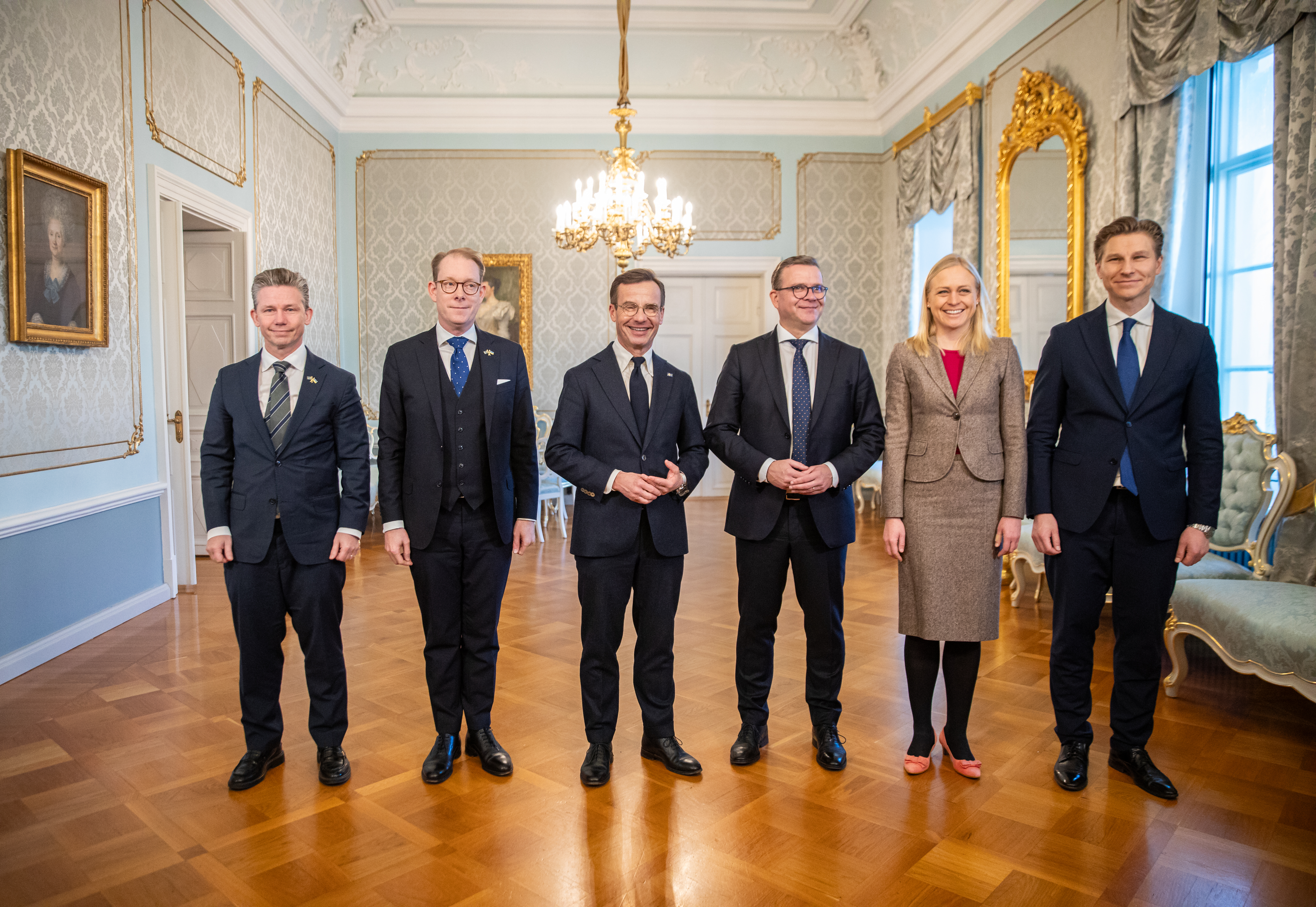
Häkkänen with Finnish and Swedish Prime Ministers Petteri Orpo and Ulf Kristersson, November 2023

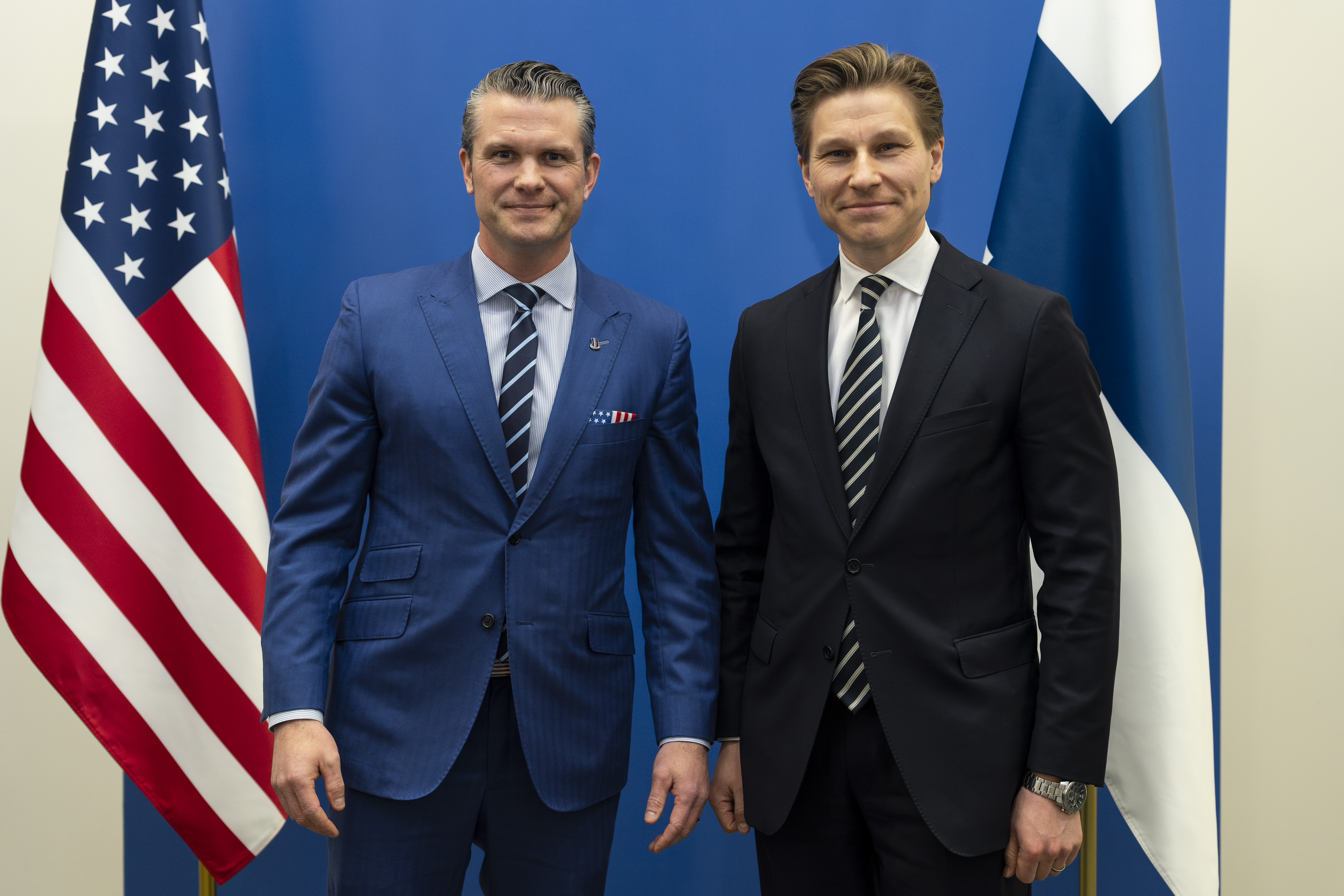
Häkkänen with U.S. Secretary of Defense Pete Hegseth, February 2025

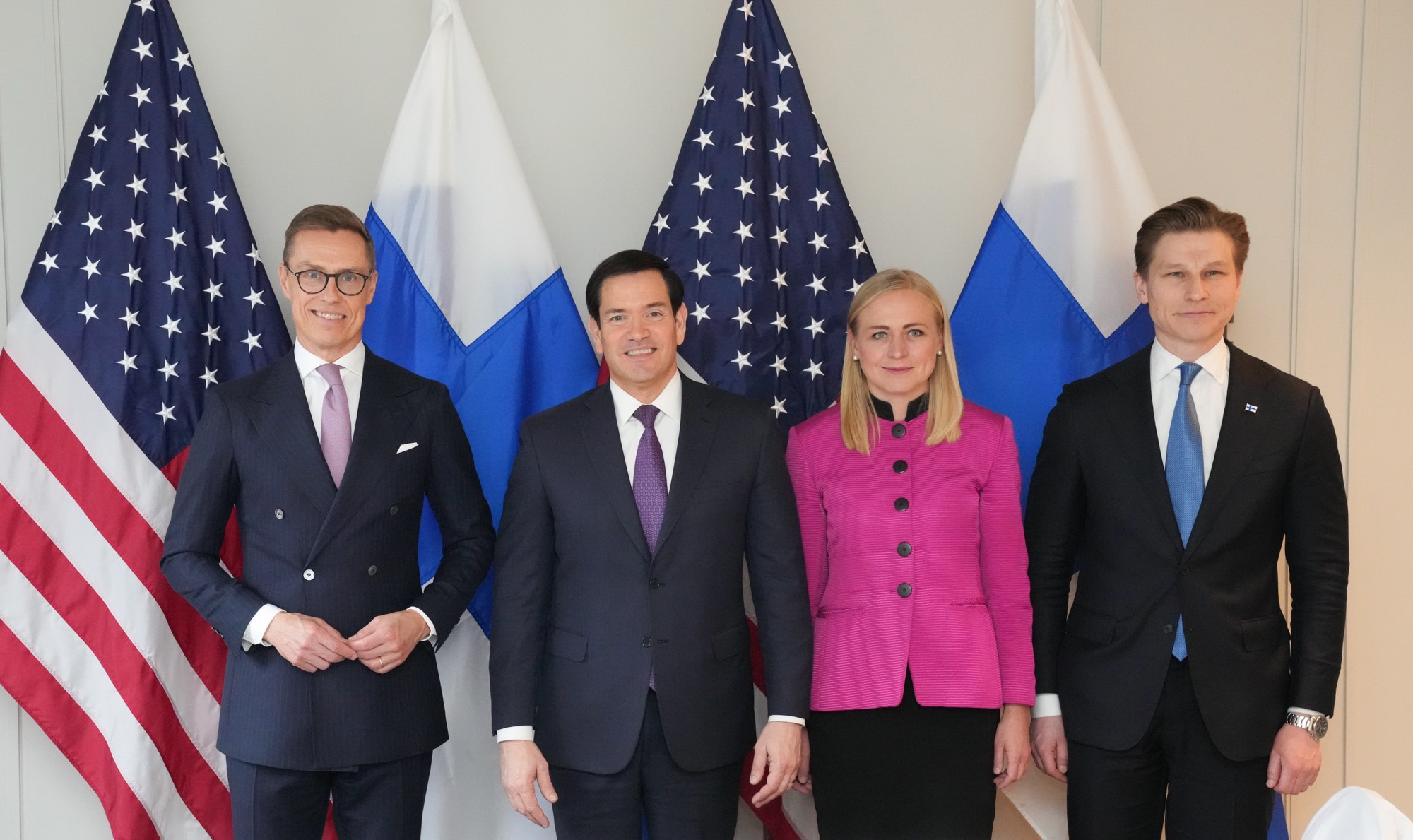
Secretary Marco Rubio meets with Finland President Alexander Stubb, Elina Valtonen and Antti Häkkänen, February 2026.

== Political views ==
Antti Häkkänen is considered a figurehead of National Coalition Party’s conservative and right-leaning faction.

Häkkänen with other young members of the National Coalition Party visited a Republican Party meeting in 2012. According to Häkkänen, National Coalition Party youth share the financial views of Republican Party in the United States.

== Personal ==
Mr. Tapani Mäkinen (ex MP of National Coalition Party) was named special advisor to Justice Minister Häkkänen in May 2017. Mäkinen resigned in April 2018 due to a police investigation concerning claimed bribery. Mäkinen received juridical charge in August 2019. According to Mäkinen, funds he received from Mr. Juhani Sjöblom (MP candidate of National Coalition Party) (Seepsula Oy) was a legal loan.

Political offices
Preceded by Jari Lindström	Minister of Justice; 2017–2019	Succeeded by Anna-Maja Henriksson
Preceded by Antti Kaikkonen	Minister of Defence; 2023–present	Incumbent
