= Arvo Pentti =

Finnish lieutenant colonel, farmer and politician (1915–1986)

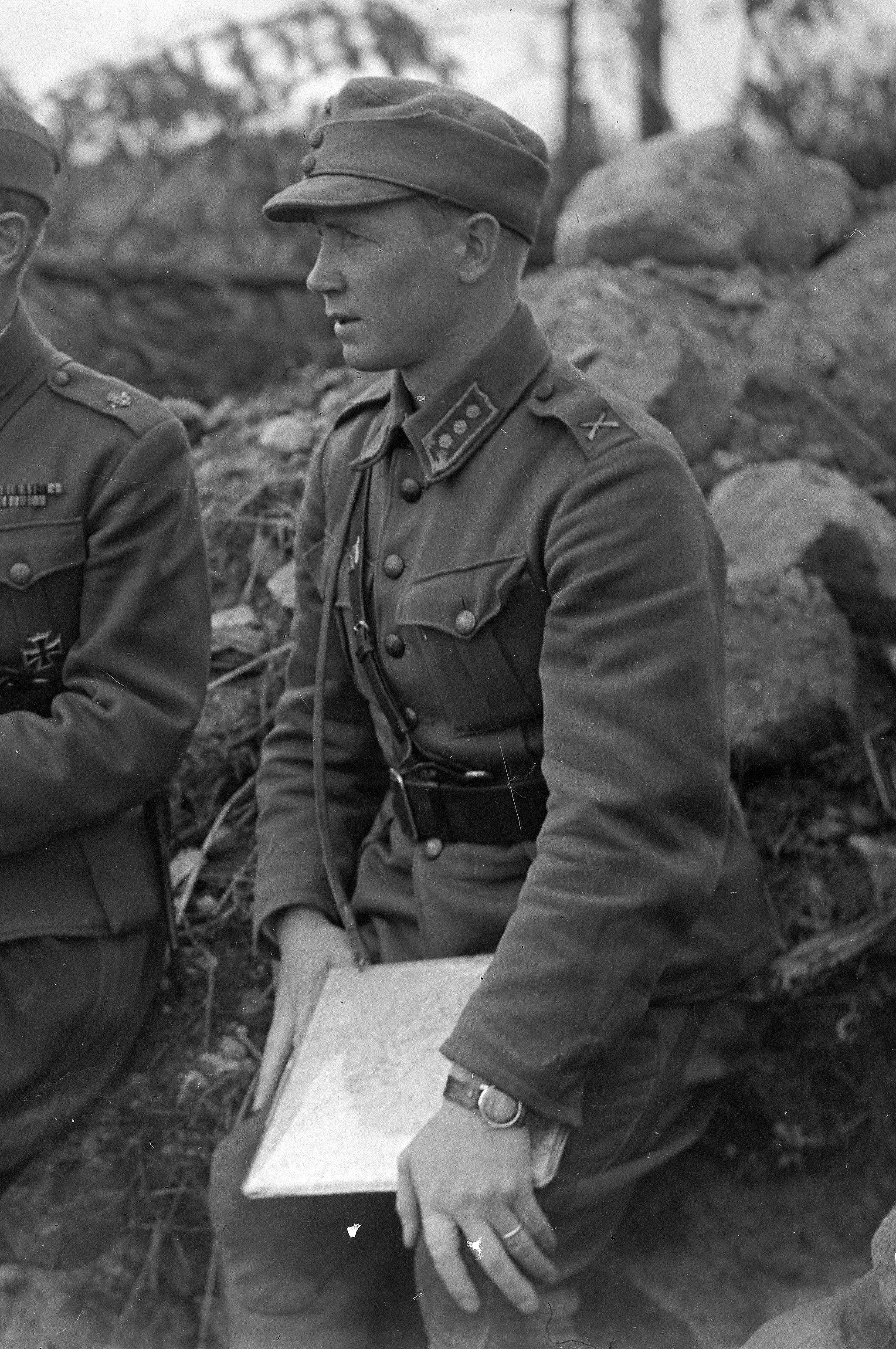
Arvo Pentti in 1944

Arvo Veikko Pentti (13 February 1915 – 1 February 1986) was a Finnish lieutenant colonel, farmer and politician, born in Hämeenkyrö. He was a member of the Parliament of Finland from 1958 to 1970, representing the Agrarian League, which changed its name to Centre Party in 1965. He served as Minister of Defence from 13 April 1962 to 18 December 1963, from 12 September 1964 to 27 May 1966, from 14 May to 15 July 1970 and from 29 October 1971 to 23 February 1972. He was the director of the Finnish Security Intelligence Service from 1972 to 1978. He was a presidential elector in the 1956, 1962 and 1968 presidential elections.

Pentti participated in the Weapons Cache Case, acting as the head of the weapons cache. He was detained for 22 months, after which he received a suspended sentence of eight months.
