= Wiljam Sarjala =

Finnish politician (1901–1977)

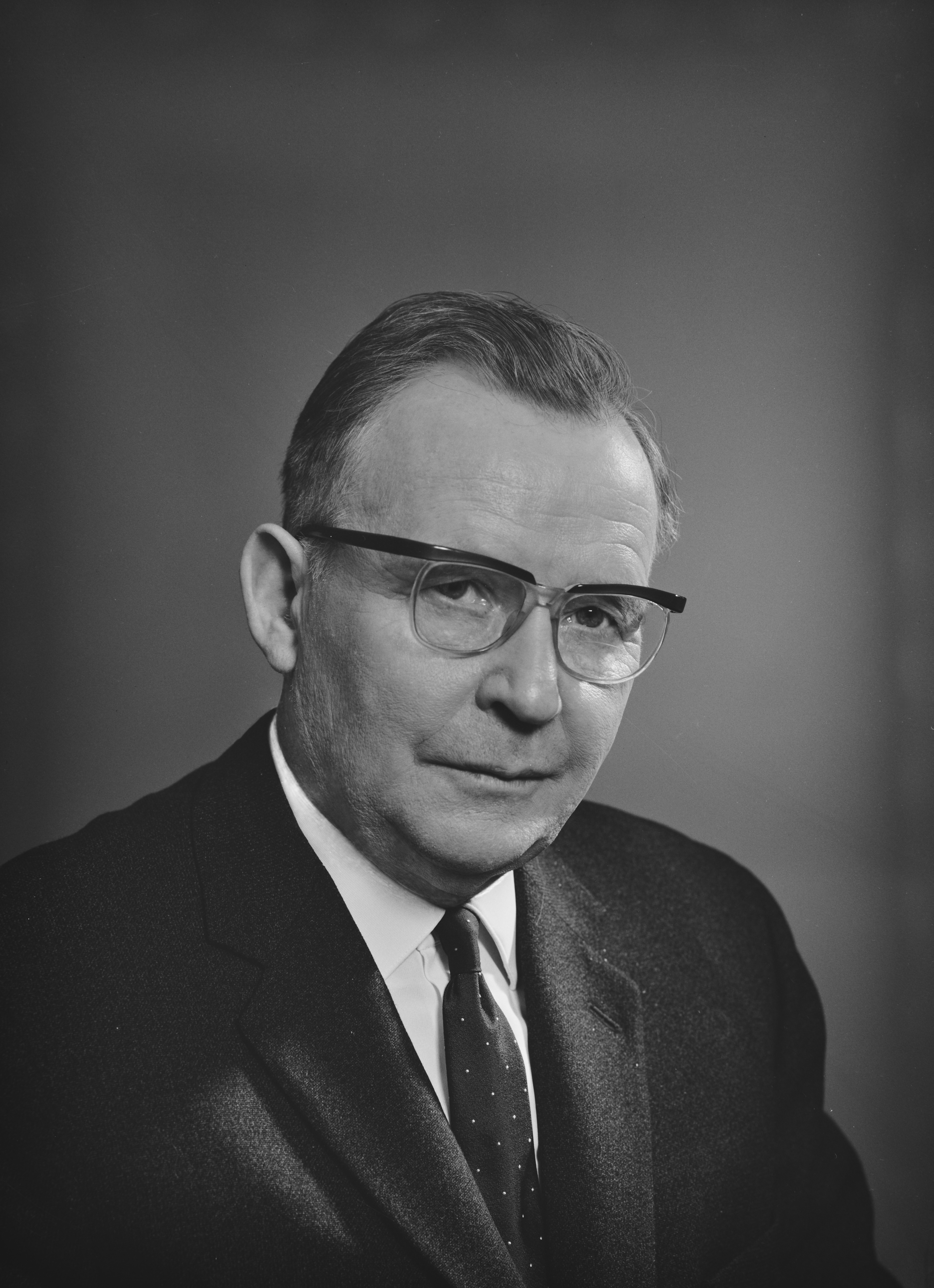
Wiljam Sarjala in 1966

Vihtori Wiljam Sarjala (18 December 1901 – 6 May 1977; surname until 1935 Sulo) was a Finnish politician, born in Laitila.

He was a member of the Parliament of Finland from 1948 to 1970, representing the Agrarian League, which changed its name to Centre Party in 1965. He served as Deputy Minister of Finance from 27 May to 2 July 1957, Minister of Transport and Public Works from 2 July to 29 November 1957 and Minister of Finance from 13 January 1959 to 13 April 1962. He was a presidential elector in the 1950, 1956, 1962 and 1968 presidential elections.
