= Eeli Erkkilä =

Finnish politician

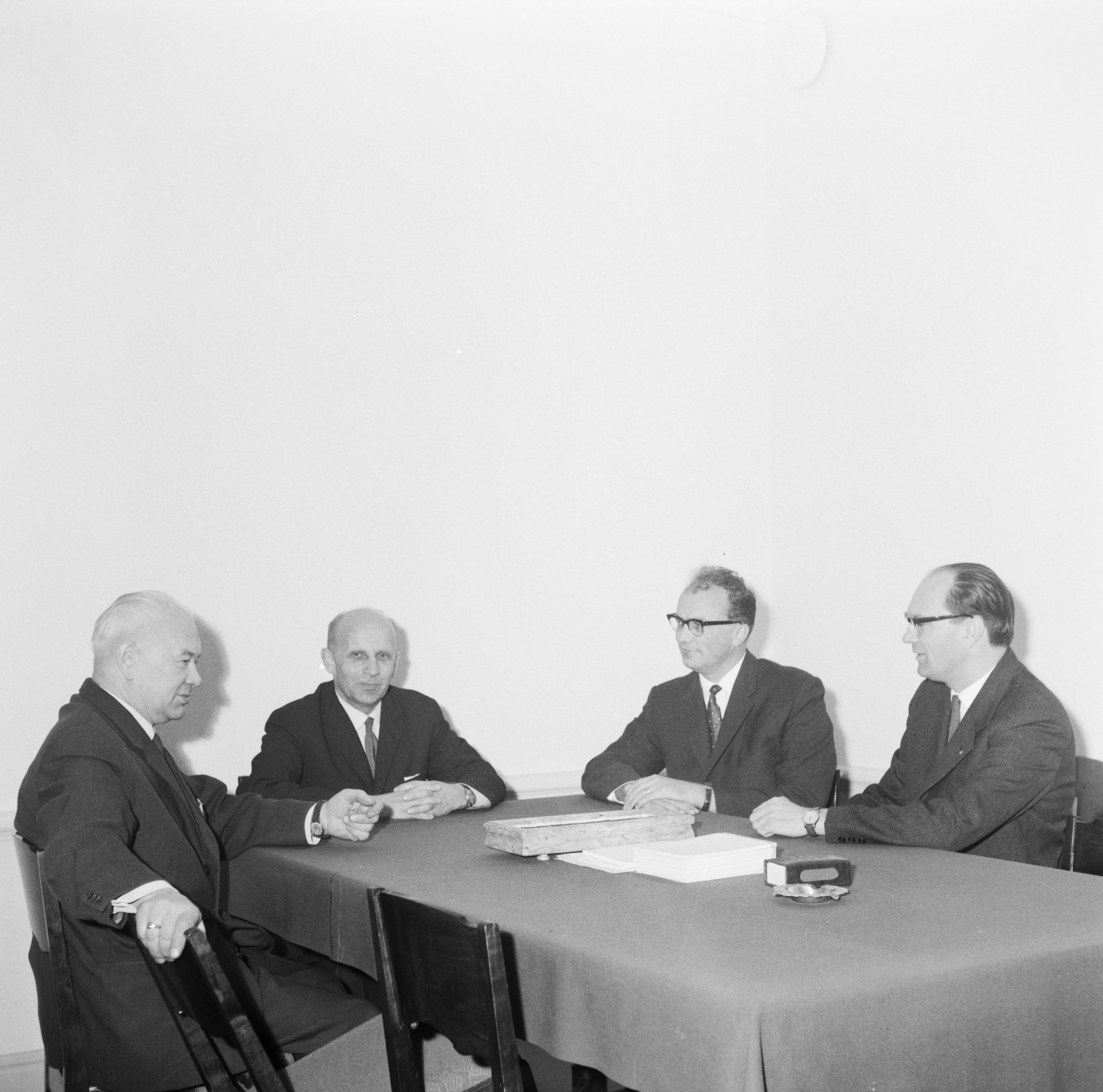
Eeli Erkkilä in a meeting in Oulu

Eeli Johannes Erkkilä (21 November 1909 - 1 April 1963) was a Finnish smallholder and politician, born in Oulainen. He served as Deputy Minister of Social Affairs from 13 January 1959 to 14 July 1961, Deputy Minister of Transport and Public Works from 14 July 1961 to 26 February 1962, Minister of Transport and Public Works from 26 February to 13 April 1962 and Minister of the Interior for 13 April 1962 to 9 February 1963. He was a member of the Parliament of Finland from 1951 until his death in 1963.
