= Vaasa (parliamentary electoral district) =

Electoral district of the Parliament of Finland

- Vasa
- Electoral District for the Parliament of Finland
- Location of Vaasa within Finland
- Municipality: List: Akaa; Hämeenkyrö; Ikaalinen; Juupajoki; Kangasala; Kihniö; Kuhmoinen; Lempäälä; Mänttä-Vilppula; Nokia; Orivesi; Pälkäne; Parkano; Pirkkala; Punkalaidun; Ruovesi; Sastamala; Tampere; Urjala; Valkeakoski; Vesilahti; Virrat; Ylöjärvi
- Region: Central Ostrobothnia; Ostrobothnia; South Ostrobothnia
- Population: 434,989 (2022)
- Electorate: 365,027 (2023)
- Area: 27,160 km^{2} (2022)

Current Electoral District
- Created: 1962
- Seats: List: 16 (2015–present); 17 (1999–2015); 18 (1972–1999); 19 (1970–1972); 20 (1962–1970)
- Members of Parliament: List: Kim Berg (SDP); Anna-Maja Henriksson (SFP); Janne Jukkola (Kok; Antti Kurvinen (Kesk); Mika Lintilä (Kesk); Juha Mäenpää (PS); Matias Mäkynen (SDP); Anders Norrback (SFP); Mikko Ollikainen (SFP); Peter Östman (KD); Mauri Peltokangas (PS); Anne Rintamäki (PS); Paula Risikko (Kok; Mikko Savola (Kesk); Pia Sillanpää (PS); Joakim Strand (SFP)
- Created from: Vaasa Province North; Vaasa Province South

Vaasa (Swedish: Vasa) is one of the 13 electoral districts of the Parliament of Finland, the national legislature of Finland. The district was established in 1960 by the merger of Vaasa Province North and Vaasa Province South districts. It is conterminous with the regions of Central Ostrobothnia, Ostrobothnia and South Ostrobothnia. The district currently elects 16 of the 200 members of the Parliament of Finland using the open party-list proportional representation electoral system. At the 2023 parliamentary election it had 365,027 registered electors.

== History ==
Vaasa Province was established in 1960 by the merger of Vaasa Province North and Vaasa Province South districts. Virrat municipality was transferred from Vaasa Province to Häme Province North in 1969. The district was renamed Vaasa in 1997.

== Electoral system ==
Vaasa currently elects 16 of the 200 members of the Parliament of Finland using the open party-list proportional representation electoral system. Parties may form electoral alliances with each other to pool their votes and increase their chances of winning seats. However, the number of candidates nominated by an electoral alliance may not exceed the maximum number of candidates that a single party may nominate. Seats are allocated using the D'Hondt method.

== Election results ==
=== Summary ===
Election	Left Alliance Vas / SKDL			Green League Vihr			Social Democrats SDP			Swedish People's SFP			Centre Kesk / ML			Liberals Lib / LKP / SK			National Coalition Kok			Christian Democrats KD / SKL			Finns PS / SMP / SPP		
Election	Votes	%	Seats	Votes	%	Seats	Votes	%	Seats	Votes	%	Seats	Votes	%	Seats	Votes	%	Seats	Votes	%	Seats	Votes	%	Seats	Votes	%	Seats
2023	5,965	2.42%	0	6,752	2.73%	0	28,983	11.74%	2	47,596	19.27%	4	44,270	17.93%	3				35,116	14.22%	2	17,120	6.93%	1	52,532	21.27%	4
2019	8,315	3.31%	0	10,515	4.19%	0	33,608	13.39%	2	52,880	21.08%	4	50,053	19.95%	4				29,530	11.77%	2	16,741	6.67%	1	42,843	17.08%	3
2015	7,238	2.94%	0	6,136	2.50%	0	29,024	11.81%	2	50,777	20.66%	3	67,333	27.39%	5				29,195	11.88%	2	14,076	5.73%	1	38,964	15.85%	3
2011	9,320	3.74%	0	3,546	1.42%	0	34,757	13.97%	2	48,321	19.42%	4	56,368	22.65%	4				35,107	14.11%	3	16,345	6.57%	1	42,753	17.18%	3
2007	11,342	4.69%	0	3,543	1.46%	0	30,720	12.70%	2	49,839	20.60%	4	78,523	32.45%	6				34,101	14.09%	3	16,919	6.99%	1	14,454	5.97%	1
2003	10,816	4.39%	0	5,949	2.41%	0	39,039	15.83%	3	45,930	18.62%	3	83,586	33.89%	7	73	0.03%	0	28,483	11.55%	2	19,331	7.84%	1	11,239	4.56%	1
1999	11,873	4.84%	0	5,057	2.06%	0	36,182	14.74%	3	50,734	20.66%	4	77,901	31.73%	6	196	0.08%	0	33,808	13.77%	2	13,385	5.45%	1	11,474	4.67%	1
1995	15,004	5.87%	1	6,606	2.58%	0	45,793	17.91%	3	50,827	19.88%	4	84,338	32.99%	6	749	0.29%	0	29,068	11.37%	2	9,832	3.85%	1	7,750	3.03%	1
1991	14,982	5.72%	1	6,745	2.57%	0	37,623	14.36%	3	52,573	20.07%	4	88,868	33.92%	6	1,194	0.46%	0	33,411	12.75%	2	9,209	3.52%	1	14,937	5.70%	1
1987	15,957	5.87%	1	3,444	1.27%	0	41,590	15.30%	3	56,472	20.77%	4	73,935	27.19%	5	920	0.34%	0	46,577	17.13%	3	7,046	2.59%	1	15,273	5.62%	1
1983	24,850	9.07%	1				47,650	17.39%	3	50,738	18.52%	4	72,419	26.43%	6				47,274	17.25%	3	9,530	3.48%	0	20,495	7.48%	1
1979	29,980	11.38%	2				37,408	14.20%	3	46,653	17.71%	3	67,472	25.61%	5	6,781	2.57%	0	46,190	17.53%	3	11,496	4.36%	1	10,363	3.93%	1
1975	32,181	12.54%	2				37,620	14.66%	3	48,778	19.01%	3	64,740	25.23%	5	7,151	2.79%	1	37,869	14.76%	2	6,166	2.40%	1	9,335	3.64%	0
1972	28,355	11.83%	2				35,106	14.65%	3	45,119	18.83%	3	58,772	24.52%	5	7,988	3.33%	0	34,653	14.46%	3	3,644	1.52%	0	25,040	10.45%	2
1970	28,208	11.81%	2				31,949	13.38%	3	49,133	20.57%	4	56,734	23.76%	4	5,028	2.11%	1	36,646	15.34%	3	1,611	0.67%	0	28,446	11.91%	2
1966	35,149	15.27%	3				38,604	16.77%	3	48,105	20.89%	4	67,787	29.44%	7	2,362	1.03%	0	32,420	14.08%	3	1,289	0.56%	0	3,220	1.40%	0
1962	35,251	15.46%	3				23,914	10.49%	2	49,775	21.83%	5	70,990	31.14%	7	2,517	1.10%	0	32,196	14.12%	3				7,821	3.43%	0

(Figures in italics represent joint lists.)

=== Detailed ===
==== 2020s ====
===== 2023 =====
Results of the 2023 parliamentary election held on 2 April 2023:

Party		Party			Electoral Alliance		
Party		Votes	%	Seats	Votes	%	Seats
Finns Party	PS	52,532	21.27%	4	52,532	21.27%	4
Swedish People's Party of Finland	SFP	47,596	19.27%	4	47,596	19.27%	4
Centre Party	Kesk	44,270	17.93%	3	44,270	17.93%	3
National Coalition Party	Kok	35,116	14.22%	2	35,116	14.22%	2
Social Democratic Party of Finland	SDP	28,983	11.74%	2	28,983	11.74%	2
Christian Democrats	KD	17,120	6.93%	1	17,120	6.93%	1
Green League	Vihr	6,752	2.73%	0	6,752	2.73%	0
Left Alliance	Vas	5,965	2.42%	0	5,965	2.42%	0
Freedom Alliance	VL	3,552	1.44%	0	3,766	1.52%	0
Crystal Party	KRIP	214	0.09%	0	3,766	1.52%	0
Movement Now	Liik	3,715	1.50%	0	3,715	1.50%	0
Power Belongs to the People	VKK	527	0.21%	0	527	0.21%	0
Liberal Party – Freedom to Choose	Lib	471	0.19%	0	471	0.19%	0
Communist Party of Finland	SKP	117	0.05%	0	117	0.05%	0
Kansalaisliitto	KAL	36	0.01%	0	36	0.01%	0
Valid votes		246,966	100.00%	16	246,966	100.00%	16
Rejected votes		1,148	0.46%				
Total polled		248,114	67.97%				
Registered electors		365,027					

The following candidates were elected: Kim Berg (SDP), 3,631 votes; Anna-Maja Henriksson (SFP), 12,657 votes; Janne Jukkola (Kok), 3,480 votes; Antti Kurvinen (Kesk), 6,821 votes; Mika Lintilä (Kesk), 6,116 votes; Juha Mäenpää (PS), 8,045 votes; Matias Mäkynen (SDP), 6,628 votes; Anders Norrback (SFP), 5,927 votes; Mikko Ollikainen (SFP), 5,397 votes; Peter Östman (KD), 6,444 votes; Mauri Peltokangas (PS), 14,548 votes; Anne Rintamäki (PS), 5,502 votes; Paula Risikko (Kok), 8,350 votes; Mikko Savola (Kesk), 6,770 votes; Pia Sillanpää (PS), 3,781 votes; and Joakim Strand (SFP), 7,079 votes.

==== 2010s ====
===== 2019 =====
Results of the 2019 parliamentary election held on 14 April 2019:

Party		Party			Electoral Alliance		
Party		Votes	%	Seats	Votes	%	Seats
Swedish People's Party of Finland	SFP	52,880	21.08%	4	52,880	21.08%	4
Centre Party	Kesk	50,053	19.95%	4	50,053	19.95%	4
Finns Party	PS	42,843	17.08%	3	42,843	17.08%	3
Social Democratic Party of Finland	SDP	33,608	13.39%	2	33,608	13.39%	2
National Coalition Party	Kok	29,530	11.77%	2	29,530	11.77%	2
Christian Democrats	KD	16,741	6.67%	1	16,741	6.67%	1
Green League	Vihr	10,515	4.19%	0	10,515	4.19%	0
Left Alliance	Vas	8,315	3.31%	0	8,315	3.31%	0
Blue Reform	SIN	2,470	0.98%	0	4,313	1.72%	0
Citizens' Party	KP	1,843	0.73%	0	4,313	1.72%	0
Seven Star Movement	TL	777	0.31%	0	777	0.31%	0
Pirate Party	Pir	462	0.18%	0	666	0.27%	0
Liberal Party – Freedom to Choose	Lib	204	0.08%	0	666	0.27%	0
Voitto Välimäki (Independent)		185	0.07%	0	185	0.07%	0
Feminist Party	FP	132	0.05%	0	132	0.05%	0
Independence Party	IPU	130	0.05%	0	130	0.05%	0
Communist Party of Finland	SKP	119	0.05%	0	119	0.05%	0
Communist Workers' Party – For Peace and Socialism	KTP	65	0.03%	0	65	0.03%	0
Reija Kuparinen (Independent)		29	0.01%	0	29	0.01%	0
Valid votes		250,901	100.00%	16	250,901	100.00%	16
Rejected votes		1,258	0.50%				
Total polled		252,159	68.64%				
Registered electors		367,339					

The following candidates were elected: Kim Berg (SDP), 6,734 votes; Anna-Maja Henriksson (SFP), 14,545 votes; Pasi Kivisaari (Kesk), 6,594 votes; Antti Kurvinen (Kesk), 5,459 votes; Mika Lintilä (Kesk), 6,005 votes; Juha Mäenpää (PS), 6,915 votes; Jukka Mäkynen (PS), 3,864 votes; Anders Norrback (SFP), 5,882 votes; Mikko Ollikainen (SFP), 7,755 votes; Peter Östman (KD), 6,378 votes; Mauri Peltokangas (PS), 13,114 votes; Paula Risikko (Kok), 9,891 votes; Janne Sankelo (Kok), 2,930 votes; Mikko Savola (Kesk), 5,713 votes; Joakim Strand (SFP), 10,596 votes; and Jutta Urpilainen (SDP), 11,010 votes.

===== 2015 =====
Results of the 2015 parliamentary election held on 19 April 2015:

Party		Votes	%	Seats
Centre Party	Kesk	67,333	27.39%	5
Swedish People's Party of Finland	SFP	50,777	20.66%	3
True Finns	PS	38,964	15.85%	3
National Coalition Party	Kok	29,195	11.88%	2
Social Democratic Party of Finland	SDP	29,024	11.81%	2
Christian Democrats	KD	14,076	5.73%	1
Left Alliance	Vas	7,238	2.94%	0
Green League	Vihr	6,136	2.50%	0
Independence Party	IPU	1,461	0.59%	0
Pirate Party	Pir	933	0.38%	0
Change 2011		228	0.09%	0
Communist Party of Finland	SKP	200	0.08%	0
Jani Pontus Toivanen (Independent)		131	0.05%	0
Workers' Party of Finland	STP	64	0.03%	0
Communist Workers' Party – For Peace and Socialism	KTP	57	0.02%	0
Valid votes		245,817	100.00%	16
Rejected votes		1,088	0.44%	
Total polled		246,905	66.75%	
Registered electors		369,917		

The following candidates were elected: Lasse Hautala (Kesk), 7,037 votes; Anna-Maja Henriksson (SFP), 10,673 votes; Reijo Hongisto (PS), 6,736 votes; Susanna Koski (Kok), 3,102 votes; Antti Kurvinen (Kesk), 5,838 votes; Mika Lintilä (Kesk), 5,243 votes; Mats Nylund (SFP), 5,189 votes; Peter Östman (KD), 6,577 votes; Tuomo Puumala (Kesk), 7,762 votes; Paula Risikko (Kok), 9,812 votes; Vesa-Matti Saarakkala (PS), 8,529 votes; Mikko Savola (Kesk), 8,476 votes; Joakim Strand (SFP), 10,374 votes; Maria Tolppanen (PS), 5,476 votes; Jutta Urpilainen (SDP), 11,627 votes; and Harry Wallin (SDP), 4,608 votes.

===== 2011 =====
Results of the 2011 parliamentary election held on 17 April 2011:

Party		Party			Electoral Alliance		
Party		Votes	%	Seats	Votes	%	Seats
Centre Party	Kesk	56,368	22.65%	4	56,368	22.65%	4
Swedish People's Party of Finland	SFP	48,321	19.42%	4	48,321	19.42%	4
True Finns	PS	42,753	17.18%	3	42,753	17.18%	3
National Coalition Party	Kok	35,107	14.11%	3	35,107	14.11%	3
Social Democratic Party of Finland	SDP	34,757	13.97%	2	34,757	13.97%	2
Christian Democrats	KD	16,345	6.57%	1	16,345	6.57%	1
Left Alliance	Vas	9,320	3.74%	0	9,320	3.74%	0
Green League	Vihr	3,546	1.42%	0	3,546	1.42%	0
Pirate Party	Pir	618	0.25%	0	618	0.25%	0
Independence Party	IPU	567	0.23%	0	567	0.23%	0
Senior Citizens' Party		450	0.18%	0	450	0.18%	0
Communist Party of Finland	SKP	235	0.09%	0	279	0.11%	0
Communist Workers' Party – For Peace and Socialism	KTP	44	0.02%	0	279	0.11%	0
Pontus Toivanen (Independent)		190	0.08%	0	190	0.08%	0
Change 2011		114	0.05%	0	114	0.05%	0
Freedom Party – Finland's Future	VP	110	0.04%	0	110	0.04%	0
Workers' Party of Finland	STP	36	0.01%	0	36	0.01%	0
Valid votes		248,881	100.00%	17	248,881	100.00%	17
Rejected votes		1,207	0.48%				
Total polled		250,088	68.10%				
Registered electors		367,263					

The following candidates were elected: Lars Erik Gästgivars (SFP), 5,650 votes; Lasse Hautala (Kesk), 6,592 votes; Anna-Maja Henriksson (SFP), 8,392 votes; Reijo Hongisto (PS), 7,444 votes; Miapetra Kumpula-Natri (SDP), 7,324 votes; Mika Lintilä (Kesk), 5,035 votes; Markku Mäntymaa (Kok), 3,806 votes; Mats Nylund (SFP), 5,709 votes; Peter Östman (KD), 5,349 votes; Tuomo Puumala (Kesk), 6,898 votes; Paula Risikko (Kok), 11,907 votes; Vesa-Matti Saarakkala (PS), 8,276 votes; Janne Sankelo (Kok), 3,792 votes; Mikko Savola (Kesk), 5,985 votes; Maria Tolppanen (PS), 2,855 votes; Jutta Urpilainen (SDP), 11,670 votes; and Ulla-Maj Wideroos (SFP), 6,077 votes.

==== 2000s ====
===== 2007 =====
Results of the 2007 parliamentary election held on 18 March 2007:

Party		Party			Electoral Alliance		
Party		Votes	%	Seats	Votes	%	Seats
Centre Party	Kesk	78,523	32.45%	6	78,523	32.45%	6
Swedish People's Party of Finland	SFP	49,839	20.60%	4	49,839	20.60%	4
National Coalition Party	Kok	34,101	14.09%	3	34,101	14.09%	3
Social Democratic Party of Finland	SDP	30,720	12.70%	2	30,720	12.70%	2
Christian Democrats	KD	16,919	6.99%	1	16,919	6.99%	1
True Finns	PS	14,454	5.97%	1	15,646	6.47%	1
Independence Party	IPU	1,192	0.49%	0	15,646	6.47%	1
Left Alliance	Vas	11,342	4.69%	0	11,342	4.69%	0
Green League	Vihr	3,543	1.46%	0	3,543	1.46%	0
Pensioners for People		851	0.35%	0	851	0.35%	0
Communist Party of Finland	SKP	307	0.13%	0	307	0.13%	0
Patriotic People's Movement	IKL	61	0.03%	0	61	0.03%	0
Communist Workers' Party – For Peace and Socialism	KTP	54	0.02%	0	54	0.02%	0
Workers' Party of Finland	STP	45	0.02%	0	45	0.02%	0
Valid votes		241,951	100.00%	17	241,951	100.00%	17
Rejected votes		1,300	0.53%				
Total polled		243,251	66.62%				
Registered electors		365,137					

The following candidates were elected: Esko Ahonen (Kesk), 5,974 votes; Susanna Haapoja (Kesk), 7,263 votes; Anna-Maja Henriksson (SFP), 4,600 votes; Bjarne Kallis (KD), 7,821 votes; Miapetra Kumpula-Natri (SDP), 7,285 votes; Mika Lintilä (Kesk), 7,697 votes; Juha Mieto (Kesk), 13,768 votes; Håkan Nordman (SFP), 5,430 votes; Mats Nylund (SFP), 7,084 votes; Petri Pihlajaniemi (Kok), 3,091 votes; Tuomo Puumala (Kesk), 7,335 votes; Paula Risikko (Kok), 9,265 votes; Petri Salo (Kok), 6,344 votes; Paula Sihto (Kesk), 7,313 votes; Jutta Urpilainen (SDP), 7,244 votes; Raimo Vistbacka (PS), 8,046 votes; and Ulla-Maj Wideroos (SFP), 9,141 votes.

===== 2003 =====
Results of the 2003 parliamentary election held on 16 March 2003:

Party		Party			Electoral Alliance		
Party		Votes	%	Seats	Votes	%	Seats
Centre Party	Kesk	83,586	33.89%	7	83,586	33.89%	7
Swedish People's Party of Finland	SFP	45,930	18.62%	3	45,930	18.62%	3
Social Democratic Party of Finland	SDP	39,039	15.83%	3	39,039	15.83%	3
National Coalition Party	Kok	28,483	11.55%	2	28,483	11.55%	2
Christian Democrats	KD	19,331	7.84%	1	19,331	7.84%	1
True Finns	PS	11,239	4.56%	1	11,675	4.73%	1
Pensioners for People		236	0.10%	0	11,675	4.73%	1
Kirjava ”Puolue” – Elonkehän Puolesta	KIPU	127	0.05%	0	11,675	4.73%	1
Liberals	Lib	73	0.03%	0	11,675	4.73%	1
Left Alliance	Vas	10,816	4.39%	0	10,816	4.39%	0
Green League	Vihr	5,949	2.41%	0	5,949	2.41%	0
Forces for Change in Finland		899	0.36%	0	899	0.36%	0
Communist Party of Finland	SKP	655	0.27%	0	655	0.27%	0
Joint Responsibility Party		162	0.07%	0	162	0.07%	0
Communist Workers' Party – For Peace and Socialism	KTP	114	0.05%	0	114	0.05%	0
Valid votes		246,639	100.00%	17	246,639	100.00%	17
Rejected votes		1,621	0.65%				
Total polled		248,260	68.16%				
Registered electors		364,247					

The following candidates were elected: Esko Ahonen (Kesk), 8,420 votes; Nils-Anders Granvik (SFP), 8,739 votes; Susanna Haapoja (Kesk), 6,135 votes; Lasse Hautala (Kesk), 7,688 votes; Bjarne Kallis (KD), 8,400 votes; Mari Kiviniemi (Kesk), 6,781 votes; Miapetra Kumpula (SDP), 6,245 votes; Mika Lintilä (Kesk), 10,127 votes; Pehr Löv (SFP), 6,738 votes; Aulis Ranta-Muotio (Kesk), 6,940 votes; Paula Risikko (Kok), 4,344 votes; Petri Salo (Kok), 9,114 votes; Jutta Urpilainen (SDP), 5,365 votes; Jukka Vihriälä (Kesk), 9,923 votes; Raimo Vistbacka (PS), 8,366 votes; Harry Wallin (SDP), 6,941 votes; and Ulla-Maj Wideroos (SFP), 6,630 votes.

==== 1990s ====
===== 1999 =====
Results of the 1999 parliamentary election held on 21 March 1999:

Party		Party			Electoral Alliance		
Party		Votes	%	Seats	Votes	%	Seats
Centre Party	Kesk	77,901	31.73%	6	91,286	37.18%	7
Finnish Christian League	SKL	13,385	5.45%	1	91,286	37.18%	7
Swedish People's Party of Finland	SFP	50,734	20.66%	4	50,734	20.66%	4
Social Democratic Party of Finland	SDP	36,182	14.74%	3	36,182	14.74%	3
National Coalition Party	Kok	33,808	13.77%	2	33,808	13.77%	2
True Finns	PS	11,474	4.67%	1	15,087	6.14%	1
Reform Group	Rem	1,654	0.67%	0	15,087	6.14%	1
Alliance for Free Finland	VSL	1,017	0.41%	0	15,087	6.14%	1
Pensioners for People	EKA	441	0.18%	0	15,087	6.14%	1
Kirjava ”Puolue” – Elonkehän Puolesta	KIPU	305	0.12%	0	15,087	6.14%	1
Liberal People's Party	LKP	196	0.08%	0	15,087	6.14%	1
Left Alliance	Vas	11,873	4.84%	0	11,873	4.84%	0
Green League	Vihr	5,057	2.06%	0	5,057	2.06%	0
Communist Party of Finland	SKP	750	0.31%	0	936	0.38%	0
Communist Workers' Party – For Peace and Socialism	KTP	186	0.08%	0	936	0.38%	0
Finland: Non-EU Joint List		390	0.16%	0	390	0.16%	0
Natural Law Party	LLP	191	0.08%	0	191	0.08%	0
Valid votes		245,544	100.00%	17	245,544	100.00%	17
Rejected votes		1,964	0.79%				
Total polled		247,508	67.53%				
Registered electors		366,520					

The following candidates were elected: Hannu Aho (Kesk), 6,372 votes; Nils-Anders Granvik (SFP), 9,467 votes; Anneli Jäätteenmäki (Kesk), 11,932 votes; Bjarne Kallis (SKL), 13,385 votes; Mari Kiviniemi (Kesk), 8,675 votes; Mika Lintilä (Kesk), 6,979 votes; Pehr Löv (SFP), 6,161 votes; Pertti Mäki-Hakola (Kok), 4,474 votes; Håkan Nordman (SFP), 10,766 votes; Aulis Ranta-Muotio (Kesk), 7,497 votes; Petri Salo (Kok), 4,102 votes; Kari Urpilainen (SDP), 5,641 votes; Marjatta Vehkaoja (SDP), 5,150 votes; Jukka Vihriälä (Kesk), 8,298 votes; Raimo Vistbacka (PS), 10,669 votes; Harry Wallin (SDP), 4,901 votes; and Ulla-Maj Wideroos (SFP), 7,552 votes.

===== 1995 =====
Results of the 1995 parliamentary election held on 19 March 1995:

Party		Party			Electoral Alliance		
Party		Votes	%	Seats	Votes	%	Seats
Centre Party	Kesk	84,338	32.99%	6	94,170	36.83%	7
Finnish Christian League	SKL	9,832	3.85%	1	94,170	36.83%	7
Swedish People's Party of Finland	SFP	50,827	19.88%	4	50,827	19.88%	4
Social Democratic Party of Finland	SDP	45,793	17.91%	3	45,793	17.91%	3
National Coalition Party	Kok	29,068	11.37%	2	37,567	14.69%	3
Finnish Rural Party	SMP	7,750	3.03%	1	37,567	14.69%	3
Liberal People's Party	LKP	749	0.29%	0	37,567	14.69%	3
Left Alliance	Vas	15,004	5.87%	1	15,004	5.87%	1
Green League	Vihr	6,606	2.58%	0	6,606	2.58%	0
Young Finns	Nuor	2,602	1.02%	0	2,602	1.02%	0
Alliance for Free Finland	VSL	1,346	0.53%	0	1,346	0.53%	0
Women's Party	NAISP	429	0.17%	0	429	0.17%	0
Pensioners' Party	SEP	380	0.15%	0	380	0.15%	0
Joint Responsibility Party	YYP	333	0.13%	0	333	0.13%	0
Communist Workers' Party – For Peace and Socialism	KTP	247	0.10%	0	286	0.11%	0
Ecological Party the Greens	EKO	39	0.02%	0	286	0.11%	0
Natural Law Party	LLP	237	0.09%	0	237	0.09%	0
Other Joint List		80	0.03%	0	80	0.03%	0
Valid votes		255,660	100.00%	18	255,660	100.00%	18
Rejected votes		1,691	0.66%				
Total polled		257,351	69.38%				
Registered electors		370,955					

The following candidates were elected: Markus Aaltonen (SDP), 7,264 votes; Esko Aho (Kesk), 16,446 votes; Kirsti Ala-Harja (Kok), 3,648 votes; Anneli Jäätteenmäki (Kesk), 11,742 votes; Bjarne Kallis (SKL), 9,832 votes; Mari Kiviniemi (Kesk), 9,308 votes; Heikki Koskinen (Kok), 3,184 votes; Ulla-Maj Kukkonen (SFP), 7,902 votes; Pehr Löv (SFP), 6,922 votes; Håkan Malm (SFP), 7,245 votes; Ole Norrback (SFP), 9,756 votes; Mats Nyby (SDP), 5,999 votes; Aulis Ranta-Muotio (Kesk), 6,562 votes; Aapo Saari (Kesk), 6,616 votes; Marjatta Vehkaoja (SDP), 9,291 votes; Jukka Vihriälä (Kesk), 11,397 votes; Raimo Vistbacka (SMP), 7,379 votes; and Jarmo Wahlström (Vas), 4,578 votes.

===== 1991 =====
Results of the 1991 parliamentary election held on 17 March 1991:

Party		Party			Electoral Alliance		
Party		Votes	%	Seats	Votes	%	Seats
Centre Party	Kesk	88,868	33.92%	6	99,271	37.89%	7
Finnish Christian League	SKL	9,209	3.52%	1	99,271	37.89%	7
Liberal People's Party	LKP	1,194	0.46%	0	99,271	37.89%	7
Swedish People's Party of Finland	SFP	52,573	20.07%	4	52,573	20.07%	4
Social Democratic Party of Finland	SDP	37,623	14.36%	3	37,623	14.36%	3
National Coalition Party	Kok	33,411	12.75%	2	33,411	12.75%	2
Left Alliance	Vas	14,982	5.72%	1	14,982	5.72%	1
Finnish Rural Party	SMP	14,937	5.70%	1	14,937	5.70%	1
Green League	Vihr	6,745	2.57%	0	6,745	2.57%	0
Pensioners' Party	SEP	873	0.33%	0	1,427	0.54%	0
Constitutional Right Party	POP	554	0.21%	0	1,427	0.54%	0
Women's Party	NAISL	396	0.15%	0	396	0.15%	0
Communist Workers' Party – For Peace and Socialism	KTP	334	0.13%	0	334	0.13%	0
Heikki Susiluoma (Independent)		182	0.07%	0	182	0.07%	0
Humanity Party		93	0.04%	0	93	0.04%	0
Valid votes		261,974	100.00%	18	261,974	100.00%	18
Blank votes		958	0.36%				
Rejected Votess – Other		1,462	0.55%				
Total polled		264,394	70.77%				
Registered electors		373,597					

The following candidates were elected: Esko Aho (Kesk), 13,940 votes; Kirsti Ala-Harja (Kok), 4,899 votes; Rose-Marie Björkenheim (Kesk), 10,656 votes; Anneli Jäätteenmäki (Kesk), 10,613 votes; Bjarne Kallis (SKL), 9,154 votes; Pentti Mäki-Hakola (Kok), 4,972 votes; Håkan Malm (SFP), 8,917 votes; Håkan Nordman (SFP), 6,813 votes; Ole Norrback (SFP), 10,017 votes; Mats Nyby (SDP), 6,798 votes; Boris Renlund (SFP), 8,631 votes; Aapo Saari (Kesk), 7,539 votes; Kari Urpilainen (SDP), 5,941 votes; Marjatta Vehkaoja (SDP), 10,648 votes; Jukka Vihriälä (Kesk), 8,485 votes; Kyösti Virrankoski (Kesk), 7,302 votes; Raimo Vistbacka (SMP), 9,726 votes; and Jarmo Wahlström (Vas), 5,450 votes.

==== 1980s ====
===== 1987 =====
Results of the 1987 parliamentary election held on 15 and 16 March 1987:

Party		Party			Electoral Alliance		
Party		Votes	%	Seats	Votes	%	Seats
Centre Party	Kesk	73,935	27.19%	5	81,901	30.12%	6
Finnish Christian League	SKL	7,046	2.59%	1	81,901	30.12%	6
Liberal People's Party	LKP	920	0.34%	0	81,901	30.12%	6
Swedish People's Party of Finland	SFP	56,472	20.77%	4	56,472	20.77%	4
National Coalition Party	Kok	46,577	17.13%	3	46,577	17.13%	3
Social Democratic Party of Finland	SDP	41,590	15.30%	3	41,590	15.30%	3
Finnish People's Democratic League	SKDL	15,957	5.87%	1	15,957	5.87%	1
Finnish Rural Party	SMP	15,273	5.62%	1	15,273	5.62%	1
Democratic Alternative	DEVA	7,900	2.91%	0	7,900	2.91%	0
Green League	Vihr	3,444	1.27%	0	3,444	1.27%	0
Pensioners' Party	SEP	2,126	0.78%	0	2,126	0.78%	0
Constitutional Right Party	POP	662	0.24%	0	662	0.24%	0
Valid votes		271,902	100.00%	18	271,902	100.00%	18
Rejected votes		953	0.35%				
Total polled		272,855	72.49%				
Registered electors		376,428					

The following candidates were elected: Markus Aaltonen (SDP), 6,569 votes; Esko Aho (Kesk), 6,611 votes; Kirsti Ala-Harja (Kok), 6,868 votes; Gustav Björkstrand (SFP), 9,806 votes; Jorma Fred (SKL), 6,896 votes; Anneli Jäätteenmäki (Kesk), 9,291 votes; Martti Korkia-Aho (Kok), 5,518 votes; Pentti Mäki-Hakola (Kok), 6,297 votes; Håkan Malm (SFP), 11,610 votes; Håkan Nordman (SFP), 8,764 votes; Mats Nyby (SDP), 6,467 votes; Boris Renlund (SFP), 10,848 votes; Aapo Saari (Kesk), 7,586 votes; Juho Sillanpää (Kesk), 7,235 votes; Kari Urpilainen (SDP), 7,236 votes; Jukka Vihriälä (Kesk), 8,388 votes; Raimo Vistbacka (SMP), 3,487 votes; and Jarmo Wahlström (SKDL), 5,305 votes.

===== 1983 =====
Results of the 1983 parliamentary election held on 20 and 21 March 1983:

Party		Party			Electoral Alliance		
Party		Votes	%	Seats	Votes	%	Seats
Centre Party and Liberal People's Party	Kesk-LKP	72,419	26.43%	6	81,949	29.90%	6
Finnish Christian League	SKL	9,530	3.48%	0	81,949	29.90%	6
Swedish People's Party of Finland	SFP	50,738	18.52%	4	50,738	18.52%	4
Social Democratic Party of Finland	SDP	47,650	17.39%	3	47,650	17.39%	3
National Coalition Party	Kok	47,274	17.25%	3	47,274	17.25%	3
Finnish People's Democratic League	SKDL	24,850	9.07%	1	24,850	9.07%	1
Finnish Rural Party	SMP	20,495	7.48%	1	21,573	7.87%	1
Constitutional Right Party	POP	1,078	0.39%	0	21,573	7.87%	1
Valid votes		274,034	100.00%	18	274,034	100.00%	18
Rejected votes		719	0.26%				
Total polled		274,753	73.00%				
Registered electors		376,383					

The following candidates were elected: Markus Aaltonen (SDP), 6,128 votes; Esko Aho (Kesk-LKP), 7,038 votes; Juho Koivisto (Kok), 7,362 votes; Heimo Linna (Kesk-LKP), 7,574 votes; Pentti Mäki-Hakola (Kok), 6,525 votes; Håkan Malm (SFP), 7,828 votes; Håkan Nordman (SFP), 8,929 votes; Ole Norrback (SFP), 8,796 votes; Mats Nyby (SDP), 6,636 votes; Veikko Pihlajamäki (Kesk-LKP), 7,095 votes; Urho Pohto (SMP), 10,982 votes; Boris Renlund (SFP), 9,160 votes; Aapo Saari (Kesk-LKP), 6,018 votes; Helge Saarikoski (Kok), 5,288 votes; Sten Söderström (SKDL), 6,809 votes; Juhani Tuomaala (Kesk-LKP), 6,378 votes; Kari Urpilainen (SDP), 6,670 votes; and Jukka Vihriälä (Kesk-LKP), 7,005 votes.

==== 1970s ====
===== 1979 =====
Results of the 1979 parliamentary election held on 18 and 19 March 1979:

Party		Party			Electoral Alliance		
Party		Votes	%	Seats	Votes	%	Seats
Centre Party	Kesk	67,472	25.61%	5	67,472	25.61%	5
Swedish People's Party of Finland	SFP	46,653	17.71%	3	46,653	17.71%	3
National Coalition Party	Kok	46,190	17.53%	3	46,190	17.53%	3
Social Democratic Party of Finland	SDP	37,408	14.20%	3	37,408	14.20%	3
Finnish People's Democratic League	SKDL	29,980	11.38%	2	29,980	11.38%	2
Finnish Christian League	SKL	11,496	4.36%	1	26,946	10.23%	2
Finnish Rural Party	SMP	10,363	3.93%	1	26,946	10.23%	2
Constitutional People's Party	PKP	5,087	1.93%	0	26,946	10.23%	2
Liberal People's Party	LKP	6,781	2.57%	0	8,795	3.34%	0
Finnish People's Unity Party	SKYP	2,014	0.76%	0	8,795	3.34%	0
Valid votes		263,444	100.00%	18	263,444	100.00%	18
Rejected votes		578	0.22%				
Total polled		264,022	70.94%				
Registered electors		372,157					

The following candidates were elected: Markus Aaltonen (SDP), 8,476 votes; Jorma Fred (SKL), 6,980 votes; Orvokki Kangas (Kesk), 6,272 votes; Eeva Kauppi (Kok), 5,243 votes; Bror Lillqvist (SDP), 6,028 votes; Heimo Linna (Kesk), 6,388 votes; Pentti Mäki-Hakola (Kok), 8,772 votes; Håkan Malm (SFP), 7,862 votes; Ole Norrback (SFP), 6,386 votes; Veikko Pihlajamäki (Kesk), 8,073 votes; Urho Pohto (SMP), 7,196 votes; Juhani Raudasoja (SDP), 5,849 votes; Boris Renlund (SFP), 5,524 votes; Helge Saarikoski (Kok), 3,968 votes; Sten Söderström (SKDL), 6,883 votes; Juhani Tuomaala (Kesk), 6,766 votes; Eino Uusitalo (Kesk), 6,470 votes; and Jarmo Wahlström (SKDL), 6,917 votes.

===== 1975 =====
Results of the 1975 parliamentary election held on 21 and 22 September 1975:

Party		Party			Electoral Alliance		
Party		Votes	%	Seats	Votes	%	Seats
Centre Party	Kesk	64,740	25.23%	5	71,891	28.02%	6
Liberal People's Party	LKP	7,151	2.79%	1	71,891	28.02%	6
Swedish People's Party of Finland	SFP	48,778	19.01%	3	54,944	21.42%	4
Finnish Christian League	SKL	6,166	2.40%	1	54,944	21.42%	4
National Coalition Party	Kok	37,869	14.76%	2	45,836	17.87%	3
Finnish People's Unity Party	SKYP	7,967	3.11%	1	45,836	17.87%	3
Social Democratic Party of Finland	SDP	37,620	14.66%	3	37,620	14.66%	3
Finnish People's Democratic League	SKDL	32,181	12.54%	2	32,516	12.67%	2
Socialist Workers Party	STP	335	0.13%	0	32,516	12.67%	2
Finnish Rural Party	SMP	9,335	3.64%	0	9,524	3.71%	0
Party of Finnish Entrepreneurs	SYP	189	0.07%	0	9,524	3.71%	0
Finnish Constitutional People's Party	SPK	4,228	1.65%	0	4,228	1.65%	0
Valid votes		256,559	100.00%	18	256,559	100.00%	18
Rejected votes		583	0.23%				
Total polled		257,142	69.21%				
Registered electors		371,514					

The following candidates were elected: Markus Aaltonen (SDP), 6,731 votes; Matti Asunmaa (SKYP), 4,733 votes; Jorma Fred (SKL), 6,025 votes; Ragnar Granvik (SFP), 6,363 votes; Toivo Jokiniemi (SKDL), 6,067 votes; Orvokki Kangas (Kesk), 5,687 votes; Eeva Kauppi (Kok), 8,246 votes; Bror Lillqvist (SDP), 5,514 votes; Heimo Linna (Kesk), 9,019 votes; Pentti Mäki-Hakola (Kok), 9,063 votes; Håkan Malm (SFP), 7,671 votes; Juhani Orrenmaa (LKP), 6,706 votes; Veikko Pihlajamäki (Kesk), 6,250 votes; Antti Pohjonen (SDP), 6,122 votes; Elly Sigfrids (SFP), 6,077 votes; Juhani Tuomaala (Kesk), 10,778 votes; Eino Uusitalo (Kesk), 6,470 votes; and Jarmo Wahlström (SKDL), 6,970 votes.

===== 1972 =====
Results of the 1972 parliamentary election held on 2 and 3 January 1972:

Party		Party			Electoral Alliance		
Party		Votes	%	Seats	Votes	%	Seats
Centre Party	Kesk	58,772	24.52%	5	58,772	24.52%	5
Swedish People's Party of Finland	SFP	45,119	18.83%	3	45,119	18.83%	3
Social Democratic Party of Finland	SDP	35,106	14.65%	3	35,106	14.65%	3
National Coalition Party	Kok	34,653	14.46%	3	34,653	14.46%	3
Finnish People's Democratic League	SKDL	28,355	11.83%	2	29,345	12.24%	2
Social Democratic Union of Workers and Smallholders	TPSL	990	0.41%	0	29,345	12.24%	2
Finnish Rural Party	SMP	25,040	10.45%	2	25,040	10.45%	2
Liberal People's Party	LKP	7,988	3.33%	0	7,988	3.33%	0
Finnish Christian League	SKL	3,644	1.52%	0	3,644	1.52%	0
Valid votes		239,667	100.00%	18	239,667	100.00%	18
Rejected votes		631	0.26%				
Total polled		240,298	83.42%				
Registered electors		288,062					

The following candidates were elected: Matti Asunmaa (SMP), 5,140 votes; Toivo Åsvik (SKDL), 4,846 votes; Ragnar Granvik (SFP), 8,146 votes; Orvokki Kangas (Kesk), 6,172 votes; Eeva Kauppi (Kok), 6,115 votes; Eeli Lepistö (SDP), 5,613 votes; Bror Lillqvist (SDP), 5,320 votes; Heimo Linna (Kesk), 6,192 votes; Pentti Mäki-Hakola (Kok), 5,918 votes; Veikko Pihlajamäki (Kesk), 5,997 votes; Antti Pohjonen (SDP), 4,069 votes; Veikko Salmi (SKDL), 4,817 votes; Toivo Saloranta (Kesk), 5,365 votes; Mauri Seppä (Kok), 4,434 votes; Elly Sigfrids (SFP), 6,183 votes; Viljo Suokas (SMP), 4,645 votes; Grels Teir (SFP), 9,156 votes; and Eino Uusitalo (Kesk), 6,790 votes.

===== 1970 =====
Results of the 1970 parliamentary election held on 15 and 16 March 1970:

Party		Party			Electoral Alliance		
Party		Votes	%	Seats	Votes	%	Seats
Centre Party	Kesk	56,734	23.76%	4	63,373	26.54%	5
Liberal People's Party	LKP	5,028	2.11%	1	63,373	26.54%	5
Finnish Christian League	SKL	1,611	0.67%	0	63,373	26.54%	5
Swedish People's Party of Finland	SFP	49,133	20.57%	4	49,133	20.57%	4
National Coalition Party	Kok	36,646	15.34%	3	36,646	15.34%	3
Social Democratic Party of Finland	SDP	31,949	13.38%	3	31,949	13.38%	3
Finnish Rural Party	SMP	28,446	11.91%	2	28,446	11.91%	2
Finnish People's Democratic League	SKDL	28,208	11.81%	2	28,208	11.81%	2
Social Democratic Union of Workers and Smallholders	TPSL	1,064	0.45%	0	1,064	0.45%	0
Valid votes		238,819	100.00%	19	238,819	100.00%	19
Rejected votes		484	0.20%				
Total polled		239,303	84.02%				
Registered electors		284,814					

The following candidates were elected: Matti Asunmaa (SMP), 3,884 votes; Toivo Åsvik (SKDL), 3,991 votes; Ragnar Granvik (SFP), 8,951 votes; Orvokki Kangas (Kesk), 5,300 votes; Eeva Kauppi (Kok), 4,517 votes; Verner Korsbäck (SFP), 5,104 votes; Eeli Lepistö (SDP), 5,367 votes; Bror Lillqvist (SDP), 4,712 votes; Heimo Linna (Kesk), 5,906 votes; Aaro Lintilä (Kesk), 5,064 votes; Pentti Mäki-Hakola (Kok), 6,108 votes; Juhani Orrenmaa (LKP), 5,028 votes; Akseli Rodén (SDP), 3,512 votes; Veikko Salmi (SKDL), 3,791 votes; Mauri Seppä (Kok), 3,241 votes; Elly Sigfrids (SFP), 9,731 votes; Viljo Suokas (SMP), 5,707 votes; Grels Teir (SFP), 9,905 votes; and Eino Uusitalo (Kesk), 5,893 votes.

==== 1960s ====
===== 1966 =====
Results of the 1966 parliamentary election held on 20 and 21 March 1966:

Party		Party			Electoral Alliance		
Party		Votes	%	Seats	Votes	%	Seats
Centre Party	Kesk	67,787	29.44%	7	69,076	30.00%	7
Finnish Christian League	SKL	1,289	0.56%	0	69,076	30.00%	7
Swedish People's Party of Finland	SFP	48,105	20.89%	4	48,105	20.89%	4
Social Democratic Party of Finland	SDP	38,604	16.77%	3	38,604	16.77%	3
National Coalition Party	Kok	32,420	14.08%	3	38,002	16.50%	3
Smallholders' Party of Finland	SPP	3,220	1.40%	0	38,002	16.50%	3
Liberal People's Party	LKP	2,362	1.03%	0	38,002	16.50%	3
Finnish People's Democratic League	SKDL	35,149	15.27%	3	36,461	15.84%	3
Social Democratic Union of Workers and Smallholders	TPSL	1,312	0.57%	0	36,461	15.84%	3
Write-in lists		3	0.00%	0	3	0.00%	0
Valid votes		230,251	100.00%	20	230,251	100.00%	20
Blank votes		93	0.04%				
Rejected Votess – Other		504	0.22%				
Total polled		230,848	85.85%				
Registered electors		268,911					

The following candidates were elected: Toivo Antila (Kesk), 5,333 votes; Georg Backlund (SKDL), 4,409 votes; Ragnar Granvik (SFP), 5,381 votes; Sakari Huima (Kok), 3,574 votes; Aleksi Kiviaho (SKDL), 3,822 votes; Verner Korsbäck (SFP), 7,237 votes; Niilo Kosola (Kok), 4,192 votes; Bror Lillqvist (SDP), 4,366 votes; Heimo Linna (Kesk), 6,785 votes; Aaro Lintilä (Kesk), 5,682 votes; Pentti Mäki-Hakola (Kok), 3,975 votes; Veikko Mattila (SDP), 5,638 votes; Torsten Nordström (SFP), 7,056 votes; Nestori Nurminen (SKDL), 4,600 votes; Akseli Rodén (SDP), 4,923 votes; Toivo Saloranta (Kesk), 5,111 votes; Veikko Savela (Kesk), 5,030 votes; Grels Teir (SFP), 10,418 votes; Kustaa Tiitu (Kesk), 4,550 votes; and Eino Uusitalo (Kesk), 6,728 votes.

===== 1962 =====
Results of the 1962 parliamentary election held on 4 and 5 February 1962:

Party		Party			Electoral Alliance		
Party		Votes	%	Seats	Votes	%	Seats
Agrarian Party	ML	70,990	31.14%	7	73,827	32.38%	7
People's Party of Finland	SK	2,517	1.10%	0	73,827	32.38%	7
Smallholders' Party Opposition		320	0.14%	0	73,827	32.38%	7
Swedish People's Party of Finland	SFP	49,775	21.83%	5	49,775	21.83%	5
Finnish People's Democratic League	SKDL	35,251	15.46%	3	35,251	15.46%	3
National Coalition Party	Kok	32,196	14.12%	3	32,196	14.12%	3
Social Democratic Party of Finland	SDP	23,914	10.49%	2	23,914	10.49%	2
Smallholders' Party of Finland	SPP	7,821	3.43%	0	7,821	3.43%	0
Social Democratic Union of Workers and Smallholders	TPSL	5,187	2.28%	0	5,187	2.28%	0
Others		3	0.00%	0	3	0.00%	0
Write-in lists		3	0.00%	0	3	0.00%	0
Valid votes		227,977	100.00%	20	227,977	100.00%	20
Rejected votes		562	0.25%				
Total polled		228,539	85.64%				
Registered electors		266,864					

The following candidates were elected: Reino Ala-Kulju (Kok), 4,186 votes; Toivo Antila (ML), 7,432 votes; Toivo Åsvik (SKDL), 4,391 votes; Georg Backlund (SKDL), 4,438 votes; Georg Eriksson (SDP), 3,630 votes; Johannes Jungarå (SFP), 5,305 votes; Aleksi Kiviaho (SKDL), 3,934 votes; Kauno Kleemola (ML), 5,320 votes; Verner Korsbäck (SFP), 6,812 votes; Niilo Kosola (Kok), 5,263 votes; Väinö Kuoppala (Kok), 4,446 votes; Matti Liinamaa (ML), 5,134 votes; Aaro Lintilä (ML), 5,781 votes; Toivo Saloranta (ML), 6,420 votes; Veikko Savela (Kesk), 5,195 votes; Alwar Sundell (SFP), 6,536 votes; Grels Teir (SFP), 8,053 votes; Väinö Tikkaoja (SDP), 6,103 votes; Eino Uusitalo (ML), 5,989 votes; and Albin Wickman (SFP), 5,712 votes.
