= List of members of the Parliament of Finland, 2003–2007 =

This is a list of the members of the Parliament of Finland from 2003 to 2007. These members were elected at the 2003 Finnish parliamentary election and their term ended with the 2007 Finnish parliamentary election.

== List of elected members ==
| Member | Party | Electoral district | Votes |
|---|---|---|---|
| Matti Ahde | Social Democratic Party | Oulu | 4,983 |
| Esko Ahonen | Centre Party | Vaasa | 8,420 |
| Eero Akaan-Penttilä | National Coalition Party | Uusimaa | 6,076 |
| Olavi Ala-Nissilä | Centre Party | Finland Proper | 7,381 |
| Mikko Alatalo | Centre Party | Pirkanmaa | 4,858 |
| Arja Alho | Social Democratic Party | Uusimaa | 7,041 |
| Janina Andersson | Green League | Finland Proper | 6,625 |
| Sirkka-Liisa Anttila | Centre Party | Tavastia | 10,656 |
| Ulla Anttila | Green League | Uusimaa | 4,189 |
| Sirpa Asko-Seljavaara | National Coalition Party | Helsinki | 6,982 |
| Jouni Backman | Social Democratic Party | Southern Savonia | 5,325 |
| Eva Biaudet | Swedish People's Party | Helsinki | 7,868 |
| Tuija Brax | Green League | Helsinki | 7,747 |
| Arto Bryggare | Social Democratic Party | Helsinki | 4,786 |
| Tarja Cronberg | Green League | North Karelia | 5,618 |
| Kaarina Dromberg | National Coalition Party | Uusimaa | 5,874 |
| Mikko Elo | Social Democratic Party | Satakunta | 4,893 |
| Jan-Erik Enestam | Swedish People's Party | Finland Proper | 6,450 |
| Sari Essayah | Christian Democrats | Finland Proper | 9,597 |
| Tarja Filatov | Social Democratic Party | Tavastia | 7,896 |
| Merikukka Forsius | Green League | Uusimaa | 2,676 |
| Nils-Anders Granvik | Swedish People's Party | Vaasa | 8,739 |
| Jukka Gustafsson | Social Democratic Party | Pirkanmaa | 8,498 |
| Susanna Haapoja | Centre Party | Vaasa | 6,135 |
| Tuula Haatainen | Social Democratic Party | Helsinki | 9,341 |
| Tony Halme | Finns Party | Helsinki | 16,390 |
| Leena Harkimo | National Coalition Party | Helsinki | 6,690 |
| Satu Hassi | Green League | Pirkanmaa | 8,781 |
| Heidi Hautala | Green League | Uusimaa | 12,675 |
| Lasse Hautala | Centre Party | Vaasa | 7,688 |
| Eero Heinäluoma | Social Democratic Party | Uusimaa | 7,003 |
| Klaus Hellberg | Social Democratic Party | Uusimaa | 6,151 |
| Pertti Hemmilä | National Coalition Party | Finland Proper | 6,473 |
| Hanna-Leena Hemming | National Coalition Party | Uusimaa | 6,676 |
| Rakel Hiltunen | Social Democratic Party | Helsinki | 7,788 |
| Anne Holmlund | National Coalition Party | Satakunta | 3,701 |
| Hannu Hoskonen | Centre Party | North Karelia | 5,462 |
| Anne Huotari | Left Alliance | Oulu | 6,771 |
| Susanna Huovinen | Social Democratic Party | Central Finland | 8,400 |
| Sinikka Hurskainen | Social Democratic Party | Kymi | 5,378 |
| Liisa Hyssälä | Centre Party | Finland Proper | 8,869 |
| Jyri Häkämies | National Coalition Party | Kymi | 6,985 |
| Tuomo Hänninen | Centre Party | Oulu | 6,780 |
| Mikko Immonen | Left Alliance | Finland Proper | 3,939 |
| Ville Itälä | National Coalition Party | Finland Proper | 21,422 |
| Liisa Jaakonsaari | Social Democratic Party | Oulu | 5,425 |
| Roger Jansson | Moderates of Åland | Åland | 3,125 |
| Kauko Juhantalo | Centre Party | Satakunta | 8,484 |
| Anneli Jäätteenmäki | Centre Party | Helsinki | 15,704 |
| Antti Kaikkonen | Centre Party | Uusimaa | 4,236 |
| Timo Kalli | Centre Party | Satakunta | 5,417 |
| Reijo Kallio | Social Democratic Party | Satakunta | 6,283 |
| Antti Kalliomäki | Social Democratic Party | Uusimaa | 14,917 |
| Bjarne Kallis | Christian Democrats | Vaasa | 8,400 |
| Ilkka Kanerva | National Coalition Party | Finland Proper | 7,203 |
| Matti Kangas | Left Alliance | Central Finland | 4,233 |
| Toimi Kankaanniemi | Christian Democrats | Central Finland | 6,435 |
| Saara Karhu | Social Democratic Party | Pirkanmaa | 14,281 |
| Kyösti Karjula | Centre Party | Oulu | 7,077 |
| Tanja Karpela | Centre Party | Uusimaa | 19,169 |
| Marjukka Karttunen | National Coalition Party | Finland Proper | 4,337 |
| Jyrki Kasvi | Green League | Uusimaa | 2,536 |
| Jyrki Katainen | National Coalition Party | Northern Savonia | 5,557 |
| Matti Kauppila | Left Alliance | Tavastia | 3,749 |
| Antero Kekkonen | Social Democratic Party | Kymi | 7,258 |
| Inkeri Kerola | Centre Party | Oulu | 6,923 |
| Rauno Kettunen | Centre Party | Northern Savonia | 4,946 |
| Anneli Kiljunen | Social Democratic Party | Kymi | 9,396 |
| Kimmo Kiljunen | Social Democratic Party | Uusimaa | 5,189 |
| Mari Kiviniemi | Centre Party | Vaasa | 6,781 |
| Esko Kiviranta | Centre Party | Finland Proper | 6,758 |
| Katri Komi | Centre Party | Southern Savonia | 6,666 |
| Matti Korhonen | Left Alliance | Oulu | 6,133 |
| Juha Korkeaoja | Centre Party | Satakunta | 5,820 |
| Markku Koski | Centre Party | Oulu | 6,547 |
| Valto Koski | Social Democratic Party | Kymi | 5,332 |
| Jari Koskinen | National Coalition Party | Tavastia | 6,037 |
| Johannes Koskinen | Social Democratic Party | Tavastia | 12,135 |
| Marjaana Koskinen | Social Democratic Party | Finland Proper | 9,367 |
| Irina Krohn | Green League | Helsinki | 4,698 |
| Risto Kuisma | Social Democratic Party | Uusimaa | 5,602 |
| Miapetra Kumpula | Social Democratic Party | Vaasa | 6,245 |
| Mikko Kuoppa | Left Alliance | Pirkanmaa | 6,286 |
| Pekka Kuosmanen | National Coalition Party | Kymi | 5,187 |
| Esko Kurvinen | National Coalition Party | Oulu | 4,805 |
| Lauri Kähkönen | Social Democratic Party | North Karelia | 4,453 |
| Kari Kärkkäinen | Christian Democrats | Northern Savonia | 5,496 |
| Seppo Kääriäinen | Centre Party | Northern Savonia | 9,121 |
| Jaakko Laakso | Left Alliance | Uusimaa | 5,003 |
| Esa Lahtela | Social Democratic Party | North Karelia | 11,283 |
| Seppo Lahtela | Centre Party (later National Coalition Party) | Kymi | 6,451 |
| Jere Lahti | National Coalition Party | Helsinki | 5,257 |
| Reijo Laitinen | Social Democratic Party | Central Finland | 7,158 |
| Kalevi Lamminen | National Coalition Party | Satakunta | 3,390 |
| Eero Lankia | Centre Party | Uusimaa | 1,940 |
| Annika Lapintie | Left Alliance | Finland Proper | 6,743 |
| Markku Laukkanen | Centre Party | Kymi | 7,201 |
| Henrik Lax | Swedish People's Party | Uusimaa | 4,922 |
| Paula Lehtomäki | Centre Party | Oulu | 11,063 |
| Jari Leppä | Centre Party | Southern Savonia | 6,819 |
| Suvi Lindén | National Coalition Party | Oulu | 3,208 |
| Maija-Liisa Lindqvist | Centre Party | Tavastia | 4,348 |
| Mika Lintilä | Centre Party | Vaasa | 10,127 |
| Minna Lintonen | Social Democratic Party | Tavastia | 4,719 |
| Paavo Lipponen | Social Democratic Party | Helsinki | 26,415 |
| Leena Luhtanen | Social Democratic Party | Uusimaa | 6,074 |
| Eero Lämsä | Centre Party | Northern Savonia | 4,315 |
| Pehr Löv | Swedish People's Party | Vaasa | 6,738 |
| Hannes Manninen | Centre Party | Lapland | 4,288 |
| Marjo Matikainen-Kallström | National Coalition Party | Uusimaa | 10,807 |
| Rosa Meriläinen | Green League | Pirkanmaa | 5,050 |
| Riikka Moilanen-Savolainen | Centre Party | Oulu | 7,073 |
| Sinikka Mönkäre | Social Democratic Party | Kymi | 7,555 |
| Markus Mustajärvi | Left Alliance | Lapland | 4,895 |
| Petri Neittaanmäki | Centre Party | Central Finland | 5,300 |
| Olli Nepponen | National Coalition Party | Southern Savonia | 4,500 |
| Pekka Nousiainen | Centre Party | Southern Savonia | 6,125 |
| Tuija Nurmi | National Coalition Party | Tavastia | 6,220 |
| Mikaela Nylander | Swedish People's Party | Uusimaa | 5,813 |
| Lauri Oinonen | Centre Party | Central Finland | 6,686 |
| Outi Ojala | Left Alliance | Helsinki | 6,658 |
| Reino Ojala | Social Democratic Party | Pirkanmaa | 4,929 |
| Kirsi Ojansuu | Green League | Tavastia | 3,328 |
| Kalevi Olin | Social Democratic Party | Central Finland | 4,750 |
| Heikki A. Ollila | National Coalition Party | Pirkanmaa | 3,825 |
| Reijo Paajanen | National Coalition Party | Kymi | 5,108 |
| Heli Paasio | Social Democratic Party | Finland Proper | 12,651 |
| Aila Paloniemi | Centre Party | Central Finland | 4,887 |
| Mauri Pekkarinen | Centre Party | Central Finland | 12,164 |
| Pirkko Peltomo | Social Democratic Party | Satakunta | 6,736 |
| Klaus Pentti | Centre Party | Pirkanmaa | 5,299 |
| Maija Perho | National Coalition Party | Finland Proper | 4,991 |
| Iivo Polvi | Left Alliance | Northern Savonia | 3,451 |
| Veijo Puhjo | Left Alliance | Satakunta | 5,687 |
| Virpa Puisto | Social Democratic Party | Finland Proper | 7,485 |
| Erkki Pulliainen | Green League | Oulu | 3,906 |
| Susanna Rahkonen | Social Democratic Party | Uusimaa | 5,200 |
| Lyly Rajala | Christian Democrats (later National Coalition Party) | Oulu | 4,596 |
| Kari Rajamäki | Social Democratic Party | Northern Savonia | 8,675 |
| Aulis Ranta-Muotio | Centre Party | Vaasa | 6,940 |
| Antti Rantakangas | Centre Party | Oulu | 8,963 |
| Maija Rask | Social Democratic Party | Lapland | 7,030 |
| Leena Rauhala | Christian Democrats | Pirkanmaa | 5,250 |
| Juha Rehula | Centre Party | Tavastia | 5,428 |
| Eero Reijonen | Centre Party | North Karelia | 7,144 |
| Paula Risikko | National Coalition Party | Vaasa | 4,344 |
| Jukka Roos | Social Democratic Party | Finland Proper | 6,088 |
| Markku Rossi | Centre Party | Northern Savonia | 5,030 |
| Simo Rundgren | Centre Party | Lapland | 5,383 |
| Päivi Räsänen | Christian Democrats | Tavastia | 8,976 |
| Tero Rönni | Social Democratic Party | Pirkanmaa | 5,936 |
| Martin Saarikangas | National Coalition Party | Uusimaa | 10,303 |
| Matti Saarinen | Social Democratic Party | Uusimaa | 5,867 |
| Petri Salo | National Coalition Party | Vaasa | 9,114 |
| Pertti Salovaara | Centre Party | Helsinki | 1,600 |
| Sari Sarkomaa | National Coalition Party | Helsinki | 5,355 |
| Kimmo Sasi | National Coalition Party | Pirkanmaa | 9,718 |
| Arto Satonen | National Coalition Party | Pirkanmaa | 4,024 |
| Arto Seppälä | Social Democratic Party | Southern Savonia | 5,633 |
| Timo Seppälä | National Coalition Party | Tavastia | 4,667 |
| Suvi-Anne Siimes | Left Alliance | Uusimaa | 17,572 |
| Anni Sinnemäki | Green League | Helsinki | 4,154 |
| Minna Sirnö | Left Alliance | Pirkanmaa | 5,076 |
| Juhani Sjöblom | National Coalition Party | Uusimaa | 4,907 |
| Jouko Skinnari | Social Democratic Party | Tavastia | 6,997 |
| Timo Soini | Finns Party | Uusimaa | 4,397 |
| Osmo Soininvaara | Green League | Helsinki | 11,341 |
| Seppo Särkiniemi | Centre Party | Uusimaa | 3,104 |
| Säde Tahvanainen | Social Democratic Party | North Karelia | 4,721 |
| Ilkka Taipale | Social Democratic Party | Helsinki | 4,090 |
| Satu Taiveaho | Social Democratic Party | Tavastia | 4,903 |
| Hannu Takkula | Centre Party | Lapland | 10,938 |
| Esko-Juhani Tennilä | Left Alliance | Lapland | 10,580 |
| Astrid Thors | Swedish People's Party | Uusimaa | 5,311 |
| Kimmo Tiilikainen | Centre Party | Kymi | 7,866 |
| Marja Tiura | National Coalition Party | Pirkanmaa | 10,686 |
| Pentti Tiusanen | Left Alliance | Kymi | 7,176 |
| Irja Tulonen | National Coalition Party | Pirkanmaa | 5,781 |
| Erkki Tuomioja | Social Democratic Party | Helsinki | 9,548 |
| Tapani Tölli | Centre Party | Oulu | 6,476 |
| Kari Uotila | Left Alliance | Uusimaa | 3,454 |
| Jutta Urpilainen | Social Democratic Party | Vaasa | 5,365 |
| Raija Vahasalo | National Coalition Party | Uusimaa | 5,941 |
| Unto Valpas | Left Alliance | Oulu | 5,884 |
| Matti Vanhanen | Centre Party | Uusimaa | 6,917 |
| Jan Vapaavuori | National Coalition Party | Helsinki | 4,657 |
| Ahti Vielma | National Coalition Party | Central Finland | 4,272 |
| Jukka Vihriälä | Centre Party | Vaasa | 9,923 |
| Pia Viitanen | Social Democratic Party | Pirkanmaa | 8,828 |
| Jari Vilén | National Coalition Party | Lapland | 6,298 |
| Pekka Vilkuna | Centre Party | Oulu | 7,269 |
| Lasse Virén | National Coalition Party | Uusimaa | 4,838 |
| Erkki Virtanen | Left Alliance | Northern Savonia | 3,538 |
| Raimo Vistbacka | Finns Party | Vaasa | 8,366 |
| Matti Väistö | Centre Party | North Karelia | 5,346 |
| Tuula Väätäinen | Social Democratic Party | Northern Savonia | 3,960 |
| Harry Wallin | Social Democratic Party | Vaasa | 6,941 |
| Ulla-Maj Wideroos | Swedish People's Party | Vaasa | 6,630 |
| Jaana Ylä-Mononen | Centre Party | Pirkanmaa | 6,866 |
| Ben Zyskowicz | National Coalition Party | Helsinki | 12,780 |
