= Mäkynen =

Mäkynen is a Finnish surname. Notable people with the surname include:

- Jukka Mäkynen (born 1961), Finnish politician
- Matias Mäkynen (born 1990), Finnish politician

== See also ==
- Mäkinen
