= Ollikainen =

Ollikainen is a Finnish surname. Notable people with the surname include:

- Aki Ollikainen (born 1973), Finnish writer
- Eva Ollikainen (born 1982), Finnish conductor
- Mikko Ollikainen (born 1977), Finnish politician
- Otto Ollikainen (born 2001), Finnish footballer
- Suvi Ollikainen (born 1995), Finnish ice hockey player
