= Asunmaa =

Asunmaa is a surname. Notable people with the surname include:

- Matti Asunmaa (1921–1998), Finnish politician
- Tytti Isohookana-Asunmaa (born 1947), Finnish politician
