= Nyby =

Nyby may refer to:

== People ==
- Christian I. Nyby II (born 1941), American television director
- Christian Nyby (1913–1993), American television and film director and editor
- Mats Nyby (1946–2021), Finnish politician

== Places ==
- Nyby or Nieby, Germany
- Nyby bruk, Sweden
- Nyby, Siuntio, Finland
