= Urpilainen =

Urpilainen is a Finnish surname. Notable people with the surname include:

- Kari Urpilainen (born 1951), Finnish politician
- Jutta Urpilainen (born 1975), Finnish politician, daughter of Kari
