= Pekka Salla =

Finnish politician (1932–2007)

Veli Pekka Salla (30 March 1932 – 21 December 2007) was a Finnish politician, born in Salla. He was a member of the Parliament of Finland from 1966 to 1975, representing the Finnish People's Democratic League (SKDL). He was a presidential elector in the 1968 Finnish presidential election.
