= Anders Norrback =

Finnish politician

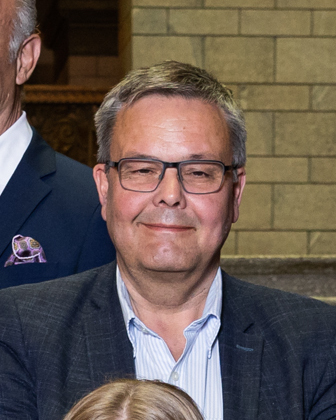
- Norrback in 2023

Member of the Finnish Parliament for Vaasa
- Incumbent
- Assumed office April 17, 2019
- Parliamentary group: Swedish People's Party

Personal details
- Born: Anders Johan Norrback; 14 September 1963 (age 63) Övermark, Vaasa Province, Finland
- Party: Swedish People's Party
- Education: University of Helsinki
- Occupation: Entrepreneur
- Website: http://andersnorrback.fi/

Anders Johan Norrback (born 14 September 1963 in Övermark) is a Finnish politician currently serving in the Parliament of Finland for the Swedish People's Party of Finland, representing the Vaasa constituency.
