= Georg Backlund =

Finnish journalist and politician (1905–2002)

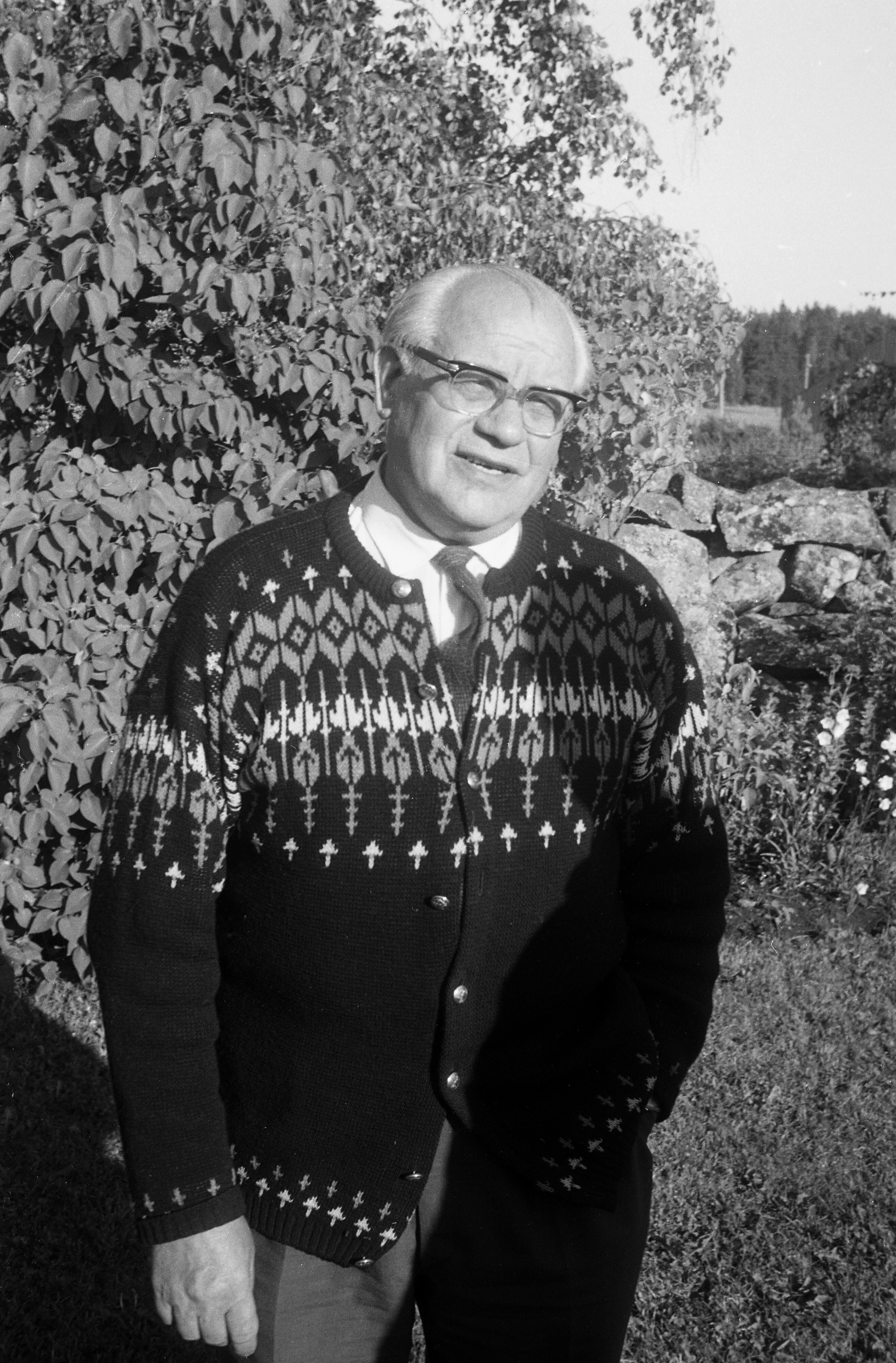
Georg Backlund in 1967

Anders Georg Backlund (9 December 1905 – 28 July 2002) was a Finland-Swedish editor, politician and actor, born in Närpes. He was a member of the Parliament of Finland from 1953 to 1954 and from 1958 to 1970, representing the Finnish People's Democratic League (SKDL). He was a presidential elector in the 1968 Finnish presidential election. During World War II, Backlund was imprisoned for political reasons from 1939 to 1944. He recovered his liberty as a result of the Moscow Armistice of 19 September 1944.

== Biography ==
Backlund was born in Finby, a town in Närpes, in December 1905 as the sixth of nine children. He was the son of Josef Anders Backlund, (previously with the surname Skinnars, but the family changed their name in 1912) who was a farmer, sawmill owner and businessman, and Klara Johanna Westerholm. Backlund attended school for a few years at Kristinestad's Swedish co-educational school. When his father's business went bankrupt around 1920, the family moved to the United States. Georg Backlund, however, remained in Finland and supported himself as a professional painter. During the 1930s, Backlund devoted himself to self-study, including in German and English, but never took a degree.

Backlund was active in the Finby youth society and was interested in amateur theater, primarily as an actor but he also wrote plays that were performed by the society's theatre. Backlund also belonged to the Närpe Peace Society, was active in the temperance movement Hemfrid, founded a scout corps, which did not last long, and contributed to the magazine Eos and later to the youth society's own handwritten newspaper.

From 1929 to 1932, Backlund was an illegal resident of the United States, where he experienced the Wall Street stock market crash and its consequences. He then became increasingly interested in politics and was influenced by his older brother Hjalmar, who was a socialist. Backlund was active in the Runeberg Order, a gathering body for Finland-Swedish emigrants, and worked, among other things, as an actor. It was as an actor that he met Aili Ingeborg Kovanen (originally Holm, the family had changed their name when they moved to the United States) whom he later married. Backlund joined the American Communist Party in 1930.

In 1932, Backlund decided to return to Europe. He first went to the Soviet Union in the hope of participating in the socialist construction of society. Backlund found work, but it was difficult to find accommodation, and after a couple of weeks he went back to Finland. In Närpes, he reconnected with the youth association and continued to act in the theater. He also founded a social democratic association. He had joined the Social Democratic Party and become a member of Finlands svenska arbetarförbund (Finland's Swedish Workers' Union), however, he viewed the union's newspaper Arbetarbladet critically and therefore decided to found his own newspaper, Folkviljan, which was published weekly until 1939 when it had to be closed after Backlund openly criticized Väinö Tanner, among others, and after the newspaper was fined 10,000 marks.

At the end of 1936, Aili Kovanen returned to Finland and the couple married in 1937 and settled down in Vaasa. In 1939, Backlund made his debut as a parliamentary candidate, but his success was short-lived when in the summer of that year he was called up for military service as a sergeant, a title he had received in the 1920s. During the Winter War, he was part of a bicycle battalion sent to Åland and only in the very last days of the Winter War in March 1940 was he transported to the Eastern Front. He was called up again in the summer of 1941 when the Continuation War had broken out and was stationed in Kerava. After openly criticizing, among others, Mannerheim and Ryti, he was imprisoned, interrogated and sentenced to 20 months in prison.

Backlund was given the opportunity to participate as a volunteer in the Avdelta Battalion 21 (known as Musta nuoli), which was established with Nikke Pärmi as commander, and which consisted entirely of released prisoners, mostly political. In 1943 he returned to Närpes and when it was rumored in 1944 that he would be recalled, he decided to leave Finland. Together with his wife, they traveled by boat to Sweden in midsummer 1944, eventually arriving in Borås where Backlund resumed his old profession as a painter. After the war ended, they returned to Närpes.

Immediately after returning home, Backlund became an organizer for the newly founded Finland-Soviet Society (Finnish: Suomi–Neuvostoliitto-Seura) and traveled around the Ostrobothnian countryside, establishing local branches. In 1946, he moved to Helsinki, where he became editor and editorial secretary of Folktidningen, which was founded in 1944 as an organ of the Finnish People's Democratic League (SKDL) and which was renamed Folktidningen Ny Tid in 1948. He worked as a staff member at the newspaper from 1946 to 1977, and as editor-in-chief from 1972. Backlund also wrote political and satirical causeries under the pen name Anders Jori from the 1940s to the 1980s.

Backlund retired from parliament in 1970 and reconnected with the theater when he played the lead role in Mr Puntila and His Man Matti, directed by Hella Wuolijoki and Bertolt Brecht at the Närpes Theater. He later also acted at Lilla Teatern and Kammarteatern. In Finnish, he appeared on television, among other things, in Maiju Lassila's Kuolleista herännyt.
