= Toivo Antila =

Finnish farmer and politician (1910–1970)

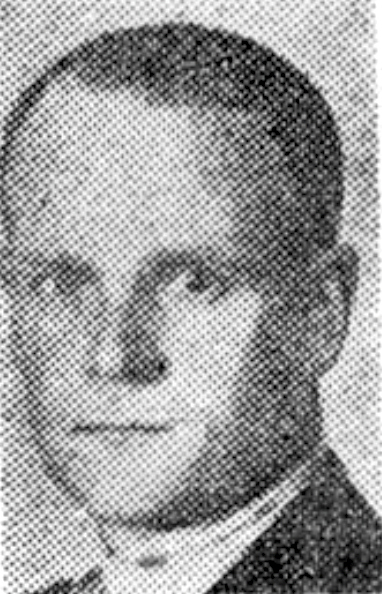
Toivo Antila 1958

Toivo Mikael Antila (29 August 1910 – 21 January 1970) was a Finnish farmer and politician, born in Laihia. He was a member of the Parliament of Finland from 1951 until his death in 1970, representing the Agrarian League, which changed its name to Centre Party in 1965. He served as Deputy Minister of Agriculture from 13 January 1959 to 14 July 1961. He was a presidential elector in the 1950, 1956, 1962 and 1968 presidential elections.
