= Antti Kurvinen =

Finnish politician

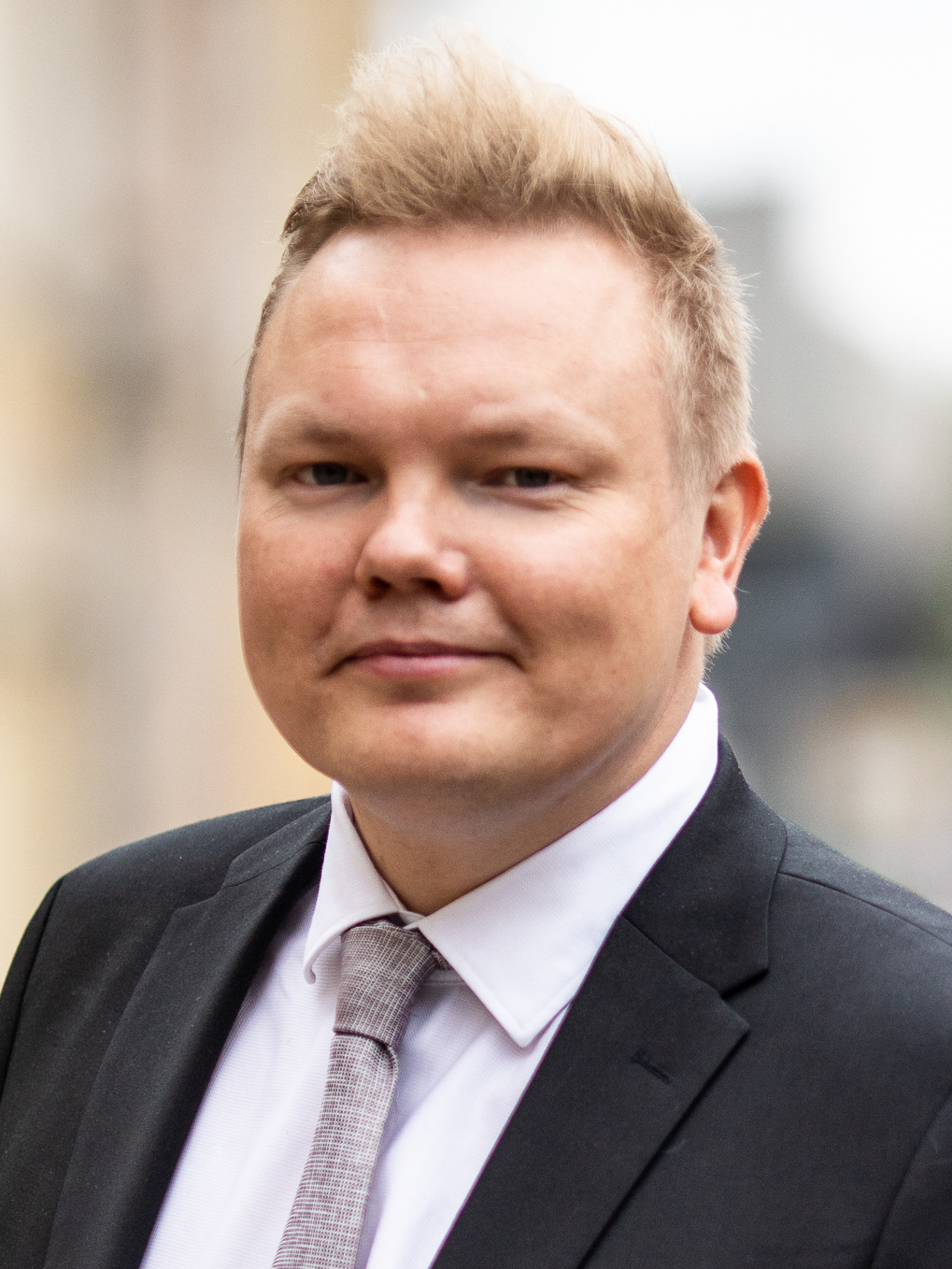

Minister of Agriculture
- In office 29 April 2022 – 20 June 2023
- Prime Minister: Sanna Marin
- Preceded by: Jari Leppä
- Succeeded by: Sari Essayah

Minister of Science and Culture
- In office 27 May 2021 – 29 April 2022
- Prime Minister: Sanna Marin
- Preceded by: Annika Saarikko
- Succeeded by: Petri Honkonen

Member of the Finnish Parliament for Vaasa
- Incumbent
- Assumed office 22 April 2015

Personal details
- Born: 14 July 1986 (age 40) Ylihärmä, Finland
- Party: Centre Party
- Education: University of Lapland

Antti Ilmari Vilhelm Kurvinen (born July 14, 1986) is a Finnish politician currently serving in the Parliament of Finland for the Centre Party at the Vaasa constituency.

== Honors ==
- Order of the Lion of Finland (Finland, 2022)
