= Orvokki Kangas =

Finnish politician (1921–2000)

- Kangas in 1980

Member of the Parliament of Finland
- In office 23 March 1970 – 25 March 1983
- Constituency: Vassa

Personal details
- Born: Ilmi Orvokki Koski; 25 September 1921; Lohtaja, Finland
- Died: 18 July 2000 (aged 78); Seinäjoki, Finland
- Political party: Centre Party

Ilmi Orvokki Kangas (née Koski; 25 September 1921 – 18 July 2000) was a Finnish politician. She represented Vaasa in the Parliament of Finland from 1970 to 1983 as a member of the Centre Party. From September 1976 to May 1977, she was Finland's second minister of social affairs and health, appointed by Prime Minister Martti Miettunen.

== Biography ==
Ilmi Orvokki Koski was born on 25 September 1921 in Lohtaja, Finland. Both of her parents were farmers. After briefly studying at the Finnish Youth Institute, a folk high school, she dropped out of school to work at youth associations in Central Ostrobothnia from 1939 to 1943. During World War II, she worked in Vaasa Province as the public education secretary for Suomen Huolto, an organization that provided aid to civilians. In 1945, Koski became a study secretary at youth associations in South Ostrobothnia, and in 1948 she became the travel secretary of the women's branch of the Agrarian League (now the Centre Party). In 1950, she married farmer Yrjö Kangas, whom she had met in her work for the Agrarian League, and they had three sons and two daughters.

Though Kangas left her job as a travel secretary after her marriage to become a homemaker, she remained active in politics and she was elected to the city council of Lapua in 1956. She remained on the city council for almost three decades, serving continuously until 1984. Kangas's experience in local politics and as a 1968 presidential elector led to her election to the Parliament of Finland in 1970, representing the constituency of Vaasa and becoming the first female member of Parliament from South Ostrobothnia. She was a member of several parliamentary committees, including Education and Culture, Foreign Affairs, and Finance, and she was the vice chair of the Centre Party's parliamentary group for two terms. Kangas was part of the "K-line", a powerful faction in the upper ranks of the Centre Party.

In September 1976, Prime Minister Martti Miettunen appointed Kangas as the second minister of social affairs and health in his third cabinet. She held the position until May 1977. As second minister, she worked on legislation regarding maternity leave and veterans' pensions, and unsuccessfully lobbied for increased regulation of the sale of beer. In 1983, Kangas lost her re-election bid, in part due to her support of Ahti Karjalainen for the Centre Party's presidential nominination, as Johannes Virolainen was a more popular candidate among voters in her district.

After retiring from politics, Kangas authored six books, including memoirs, a novel, and religious devotionals, between 1984 and 2000. Her books include Kotipolkuja ja valtatietä (1984), a personal memoir, and Ystäväni Vieno Simonen (1988), an account of the life of Finnish politician Vieno Simonen. President Mauno Koivisto awarded her the honorary title of municipal councillor (kunnallisneuvos) in 1987. She died of a heart attack on 18 July 2000 in Seinäjoki, Finland, at the age of 78.

== See also ==
- List of Finnish MPs
