= Verner Korsbäck =

Finnish agronomist, farmer and politician (1910–1981)

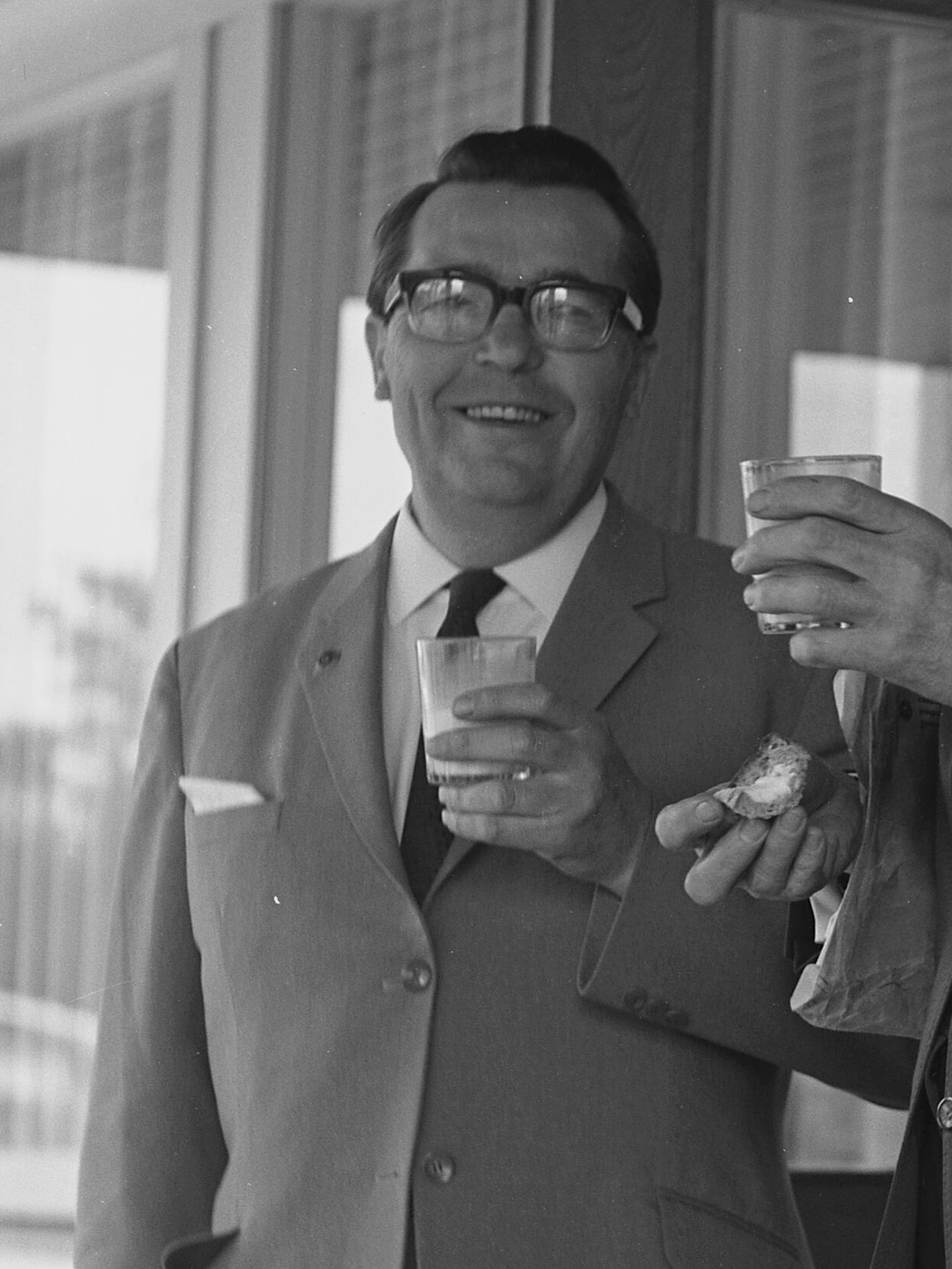
Verner Korsbäck in 1971

Verner Valentin (Verner V.) Korsbäck (25 October 1910 – 25 March 1981; surname until 1921 Henriksson) was a Finnish agronomist, farmer and politician, born in Korsnäs. He was a member of the Parliament of Finland from 1948 to 1972, representing the Swedish People's Party of Finland. He served as Deputy Minister of Agriculture from 13 April 1962 to 18 December 1963. He was a presidential elector in the 1950, 1956, 1962 and 1968 presidential elections.
