= Tuomo Puumala =

Finnish politician

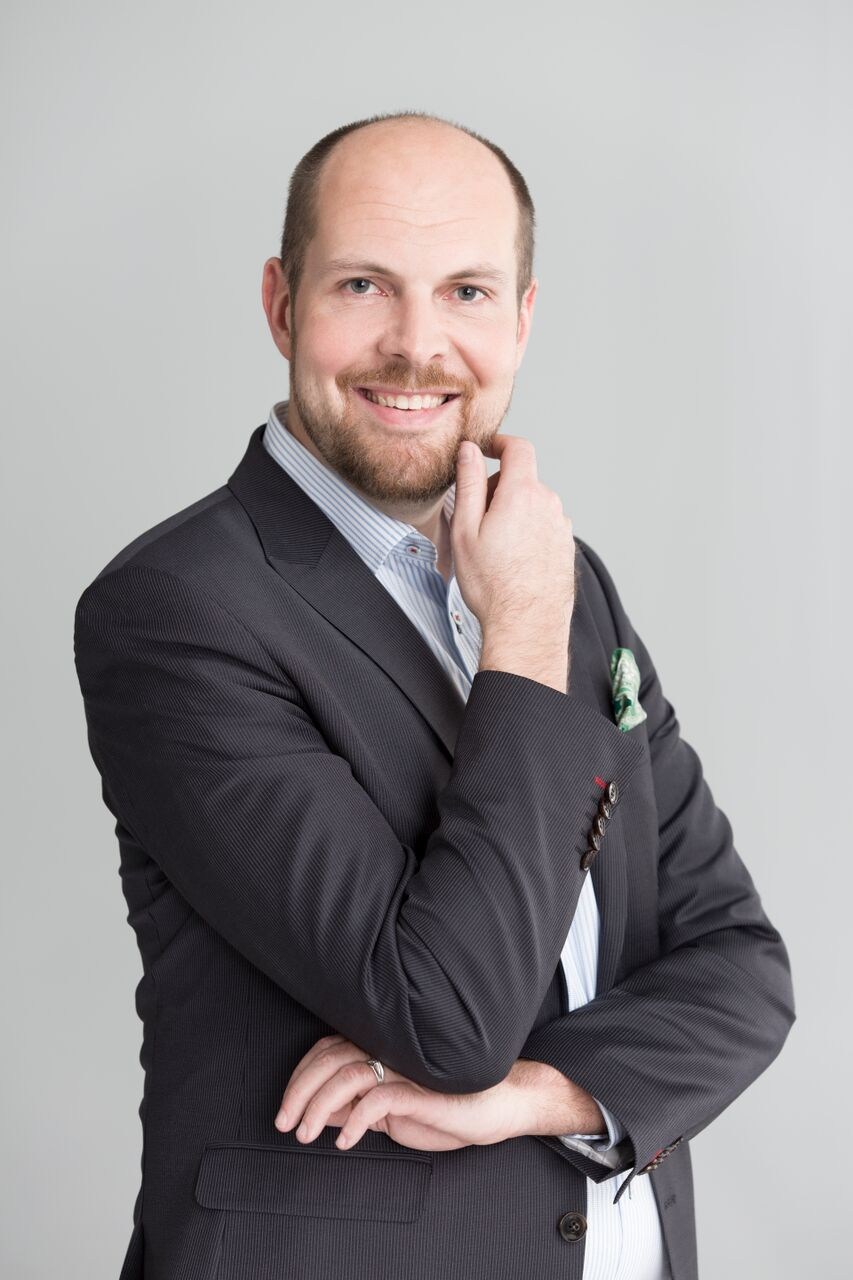

Member of Finnish Parliament for Vaasa
- Incumbent
- Assumed office 21 March 2007

Personal details
- Born: Tuomo Matti Oskari Puumala; 3 April 1982 (age 44) Kaustinen, Finland
- Party: Centre Party
- Occupation: Politician

Tuomo Matti Oskari Puumala (born April 3, 1982 in Kaustinen, Finland) is a Finnish politician from the Centre Party. He has been a member of the Finnish Parliament from Vaasa since 2007. He has a master's degree in Social Science. Before his political career he worked as a journalist for Kokkola and Perhonjokilaakso newspapers. He was also the Chairman of Finnish Centre Youth from 2005 to 2009.

Puumala entered the race for Centre Party leadership in 2012. He beat in the first round a well known veteran politician Paavo Väyrynen and Timo Kaunisto. Nevertheless, in the final round of voting, Sipilä bested Tuomo Puumala by a vote of 1251–872.
