= Ragnar Granvik =

Finnish farmer and politician (1910–1997)

Ragnar Ingemar Granvik (7 December 1910 – 10 October 1997) was a Finnish schoolteacher and politician, born in Terjärv. He was a member of the Parliament of Finland from 1966 to 1979, representing the Swedish People's Party of Finland. He served as minister of transport from 29 September 1976 to 15 May 1977. He was a presidential elector in the 1962, 1968 and 1978 presidential elections.
