= Mats Nylund =

Finnish politician

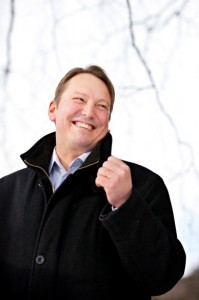

Member of the Finnish Parliament
- Incumbent
- Assumed office 21 March 2007

Personal details
- Born: 1 August 1964 (age 61) Pedersöre, Finland
- Party: Swedish People's Party of Finland

Mats Johan Nylund (born 1 August 1964) is a Finnish politician, representing the Swedish People's Party of Finland in the Parliament of Finland since 2007. He has been elected to the Parliament from the Vaasa constituency in 2007 with 7,084 votes, 2011 with 5,709 votes and 2015 with 5,189 votes.

Nylund has announced that he won't run for another term in the 2019 elections, as he is seeking the chairmanship of the central union of Swedish-speaking agricultural producers in Finland (SLC).
