= Kim Berg =

Finnish politician

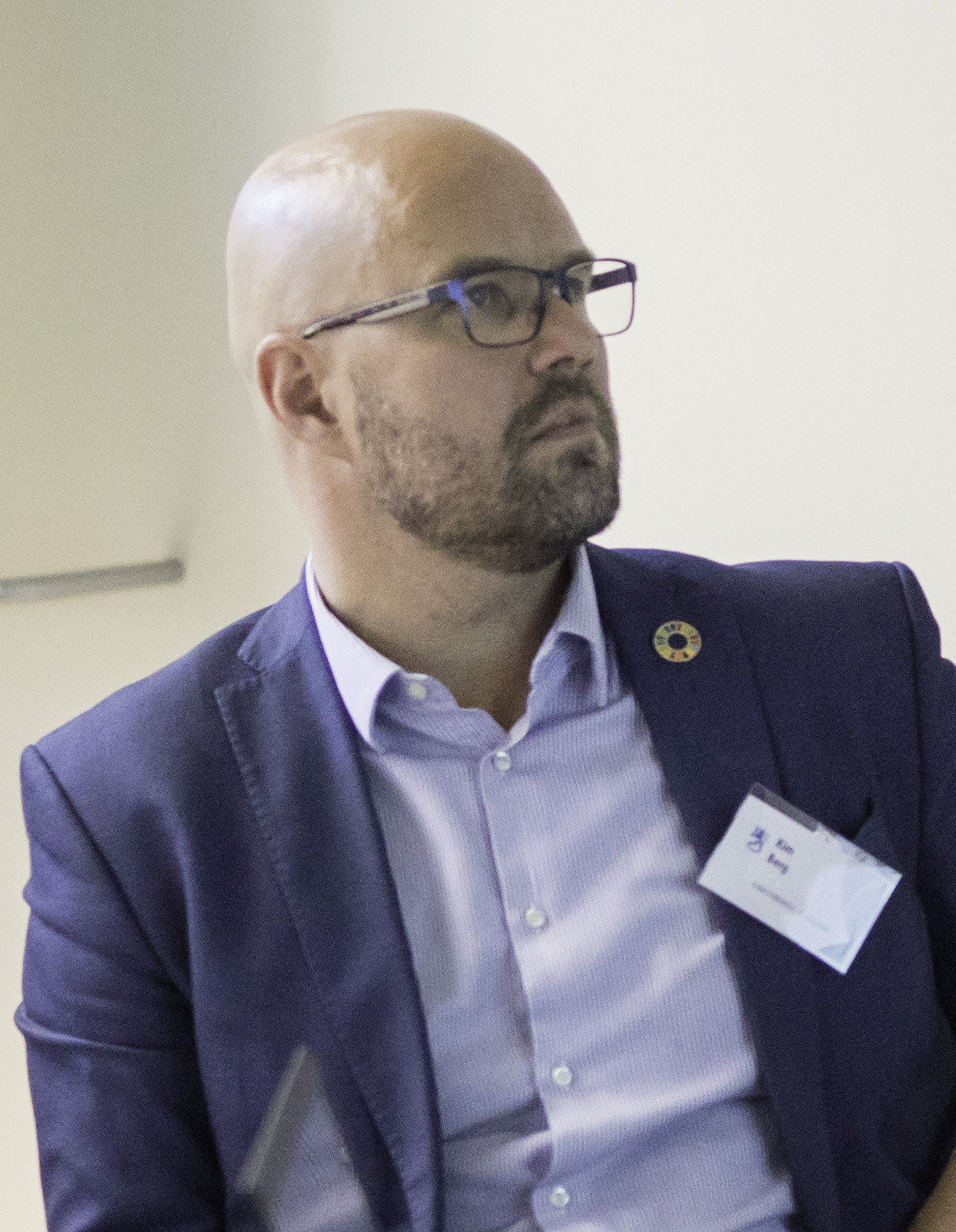
- Berg in 2020

Personal details
- Born: July 9, 1974 (age 51) Vaasa, Ostrobothnia, Finland
- Party: Social Democratic Party of Finland
- Spouse: Marja Berg

Kim Kristoffer Berg (born 9 July 1974 in Vaasa) is a Finnish politician currently serving in the Parliament of Finland for the Social Democratic Party of Finland at the Vaasa constituency.
