= Sakari Huima =

Finnish Lutheran pastor and politician (1914–1983)

Paavo Vilho Sakari Huima (6 April 1914 – 18 April 1983) was a Finnish Lutheran pastor and politician, born in Kokkola. He was a member of the Parliament of Finland from 1966 to 1970, representing the National Coalition Party. He was a presidential elector in the 1968 Finnish presidential election.
