= Mauri Seppä =

Finnish agronomist, farmer and politician

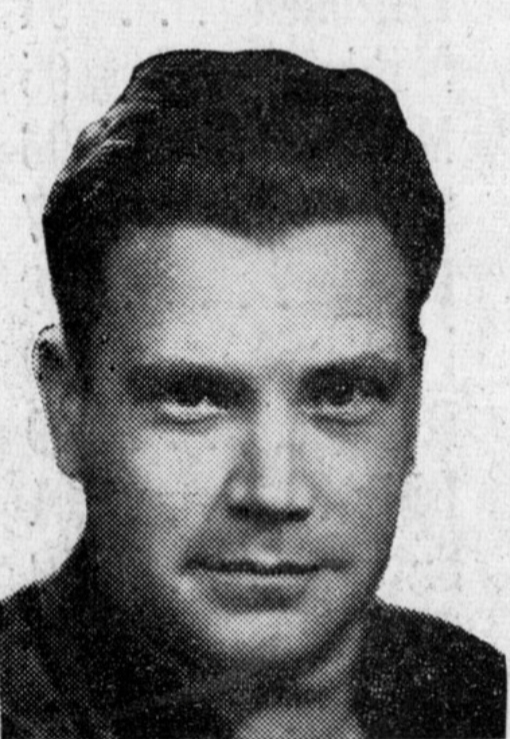
Mauri Seppä, 1950.

Mauri Taisto Heikki Seppä (11 March 1916, Teuva - 8 November 2000) was a Finnish agronomist, farmer and politician. He was a member of the Parliament of Finland from 1954 to 1962 and again from 1970 to 1975, representing the National Coalition Party.
