= Mauri Peltokangas =

Finnish politician

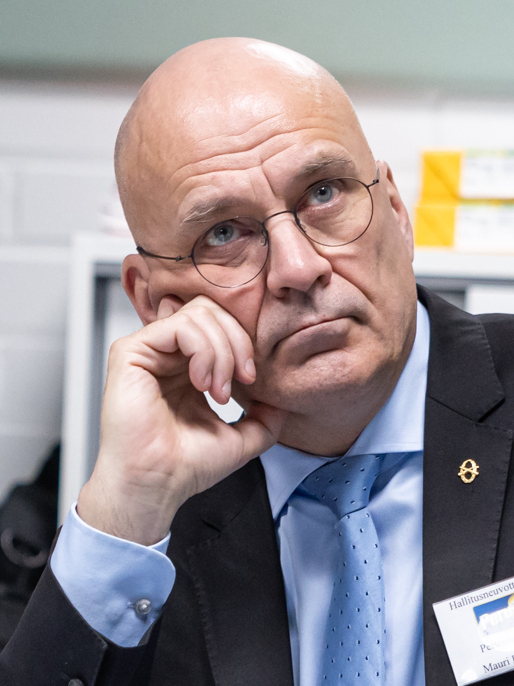
- Peltokangas in 2023

Member of the Finnish Parliament for Vaasa
- Incumbent
- Assumed office 23 April 2019

Personal details
- Born: 11 February 1966 (age 60) Kokkola, Central Ostrobothnia, Finland
- Party: Finns Party

Mauri Peltokangas (born 11 February 1966 in Kokkola) is a Finnish politician serving in the Parliament of Finland for the Finns Party at the Vaasa constituency.

In mid-2021, he was charged with incitement by Finnish police after a making a number of Facebook posts in 2020 that attacked refugees, including language potentially suggesting that refugees were inferior. Peltokangas said that he was "merely criticising the actions of those who do not leave, not attacking them personally," while his aide stated the posts were meant as playful language and not as threats. The trial began in December 2021 in the Ostrobothnia District Court.
