= Juha Mäenpää =

Finnish politician

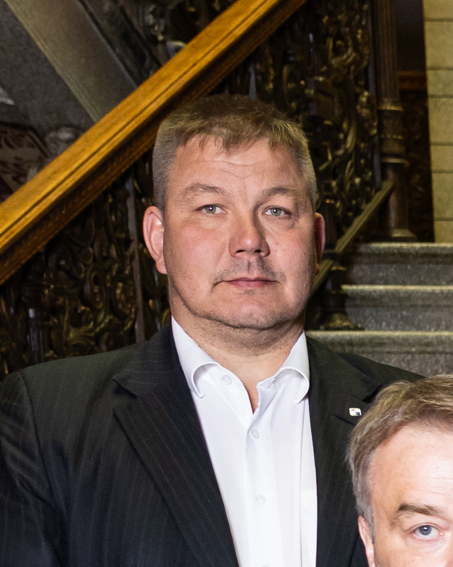
- Mäenpää in 2023

Member of the Finnish Parliament for Vaasa

Personal details
- Born: 25 October 1971 (age 54)
- Party: Finns Party

Juha Petri Mäenpää (born 25 October 1971) is a Finnish politician currently serving in the Parliament of Finland for the Finns Party at the Vaasa constituency.
