= Veikko Mattila =

Finnish Lutheran pastor and politician (1912–1983)

Veikko Aukusti Mattila (26 December 1912 – 28 October 1983) was a Finnish Lutheran pastor and politician, born in Seinäjoki. He was a member of the Parliament of Finland from 1964 to 1970, representing the Social Democratic Party of Finland (SDP). He was a presidential elector in the 1968 Finnish presidential election.
