= Aaro Lintilä =

Finnish farmer and politician (1928–1986)

Aaro Olavi Lintilä (14 June 1928 – 1 November 1986) was a Finnish farmer and politician, born in Toholampi. He was a member of the Parliament of Finland from 1962 to 1972, representing the Agrarian League, which changed its name to Centre Party in 1965. He was a presidential elector in the 1962 and 1968 presidential elections. He was the father of Mika Lintilä.
