= Lauri Linna =

Finnish politician (1930–2018)

Lauri Johannes Linna (11 July 1930 – 9 June 2018) was a Finnish politician. He was a member of the Parliament of Finland, representing the Finnish Rural Party (SMP) from 1970 to 1972 and the Finnish People's Unity Party (SKYP) from 1972 to 1975. He was the younger brother of Heimo Linna.
