= Lasse Hautala =

Finnish politician

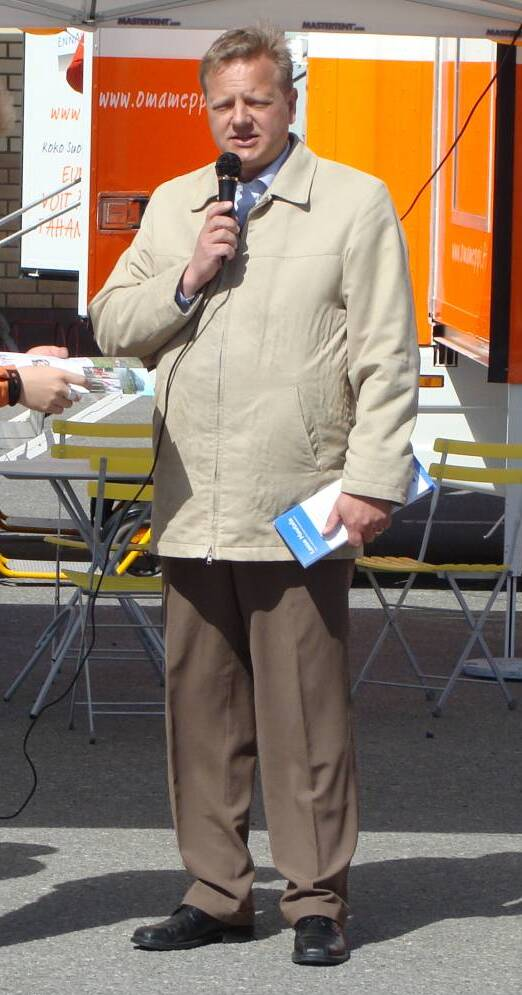
Lasse Hautala

Lasse Tapani Hautala (born 22 January 1963 in Kauhajoki, Finland) is a Finnish politician. His parents were farmers. Hautala has four sons. He was elected to the Finnish Parliament from Vaasa (electoral district) first in 2003. In 2007 elections he was not re-elected but he got Susanna Haapoja's seat in the parliament after her death in 2009. Hautala has an agrologist education.
