= Janne Sankelo =

Finnish politician

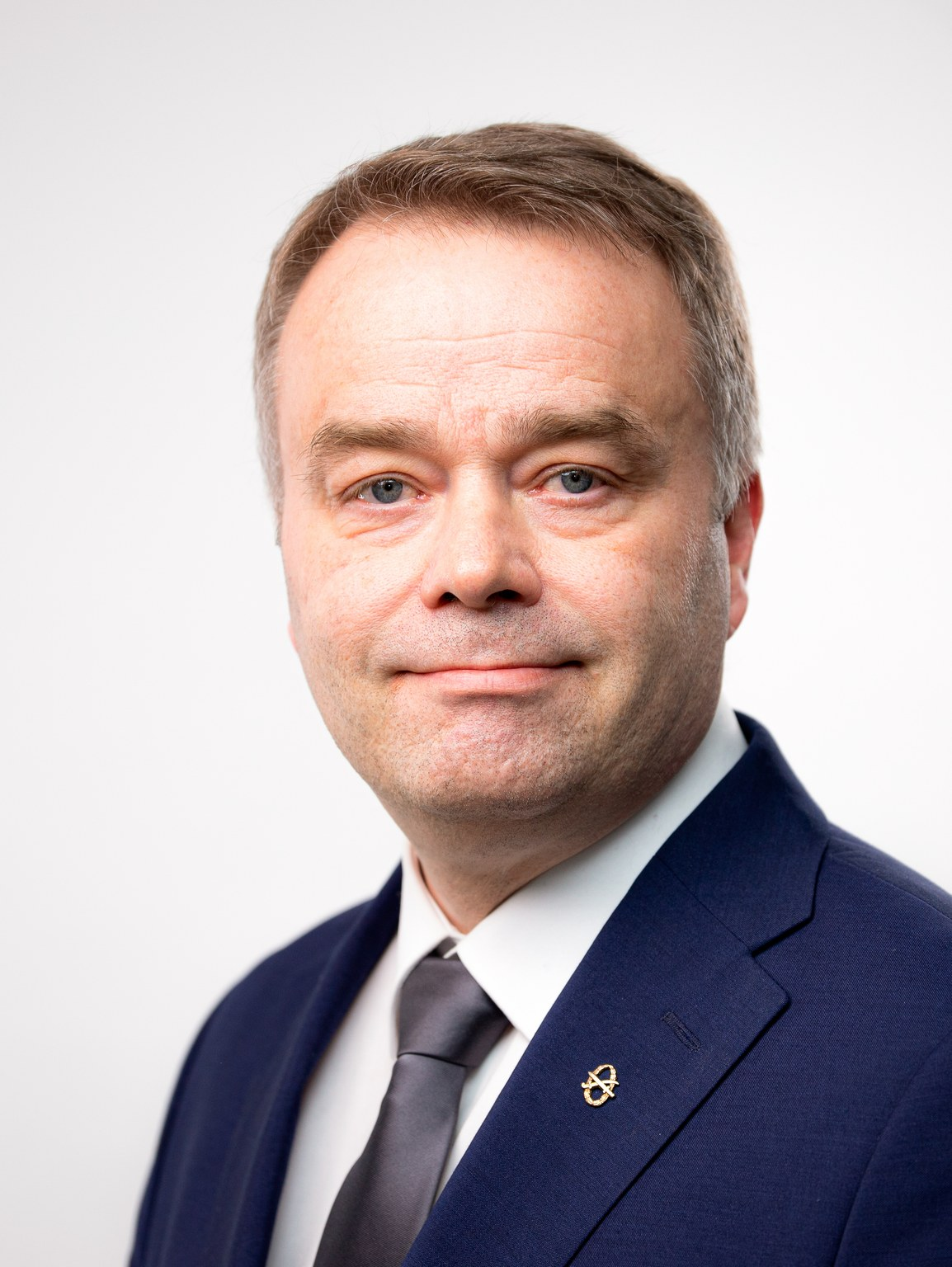

Member of the Finnish Parliament for Vaasa
- Incumbent
- Assumed office 17 April 2019
- In office 20 April 2011 – 21 April 2015

Personal details
- Born: 1 January 1967 (age 59) Hyvinkää, Uusimaa, Finland
- Party: National Coalition Party

Janne Daniel Sankelo (born 1 January 1967 in Hyvinkää) is a Finnish politician currently serving in the Parliament of Finland for the National Coalition Party at the Vaasa constituency.
