= Heimo Linna =

Finnish politician (1925–2022)

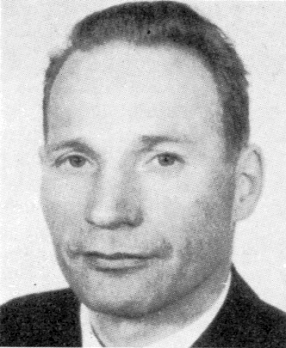

Minister of Agriculture and Forestry
- In office 30 November 1975 – 29 September 1976
- Preceded by: Veikko Ihamuotila
- Succeeded by: Johannes Virolainen
- In office 1 August 1973 – 13 June 1975

Member of the Parliament of Finland
- In office 5 April 1966 – 20 March 1987
- Constituency: Vaasa

Personal details
- Born: Heimo Immanuel Linna; 11 December 1925 Perho, Finland
- Died: 14 November 2022 (aged 96) Kannus, Finland
- Party: Centre Party
- Education: Pienviljelysneuvojaopisto
- Occupation: Farmer

Heimo Immanuel Linna (11 December 1925 – 14 November 2022) was a Finnish farmer and politician. A member of the Centre Party, he served in the Parliament from 1966 to 1987 and as Minister of Agriculture and Forestry from 1 August 1973 to 13 June 1975 and again from 30 November 1975 to 29 September 1976. He was the elder brother of Lauri Linna.

== Life and career ==
Linna graduated as an agrologist from Small farming advisory college in Hyvinkää in 1952, worked as an agricultural consultant in the Northeast region in 1953–1954, worked as executive director of the Association of Agricultural Producers in Central Ostrobothnia in 1954–1966, and as a farmer in his home municipality of Perho since 1962. Linna served on the Perho municipal council in 1965–1992.

He served as a Member of Parliament in the years 1966–1987 from the electoral district of Vaasa County. He was Minister of Agriculture and Forestry in 1973–1975 and 1975–1976. Linna also served as the chairman of the municipal council of his home municipality of Perho. The title of agricultural council was granted to Linna in 1985.

Linna was one of the strictest opponents of the Finnish EU-Membership in his party and was against, among other things, accepting asylum seekers and refugees.

Linna was considered to have also belonged to the so-called "black dozen" faction that operated within the Center Party. For the 2019 parliamentary elections, Heimo Linna wrote an article in Perhonjokilaakso newspaper, where he announced that he supports Paavo Väyrynen's Seven Star Movement, so that Finland could avoid membership in the North Atlantic Treaty Organization.

Heimo Linna's brother was agrologist Lauri Linna, who served as an MP for Finnish Rural Party and Finnish People's Unity Party in the 1970s.
