= Niilo Kosola =

Finnish agronomist, farmer and politician (1911–1996)

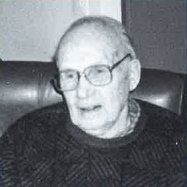
Kosola in 1995

Niilo Vilho Kosola (22 February 1911 – 15 March 1996) was a Finnish agronomist, farmer and politician, born in Lapua. He was a member of the Parliament of Finland from 1951 to 1970, representing the National Coalition Party. He served as Deputy Minister of Agriculture from 29 August 1958 to 13 January 1959. He was a presidential elector in the 1956, 1962 and 1968 presidential elections. Niilo Kosola was the younger son of Vihtori Kosola.
