= Pentti Mäki-Hakola =

Finnish engineer and politician (1929–1996)

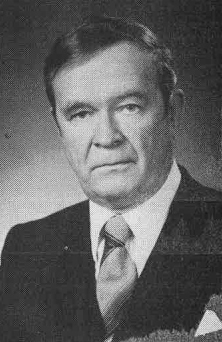
Pentti Mäki-Hakola (1979)

Pentti Matti Mäki-Hakola (11 January 1929 – 20 September 1996) was a Finnish engineer and politician, born in Nurmo. He was a member of the Parliament of Finland from 1966 to 1995, representing the National Coalition Party. He was a presidential elector in the 1968, 1982 and 1988 presidential elections.
