= Pasi Kivisaari =

Finnish politician (born 1971)

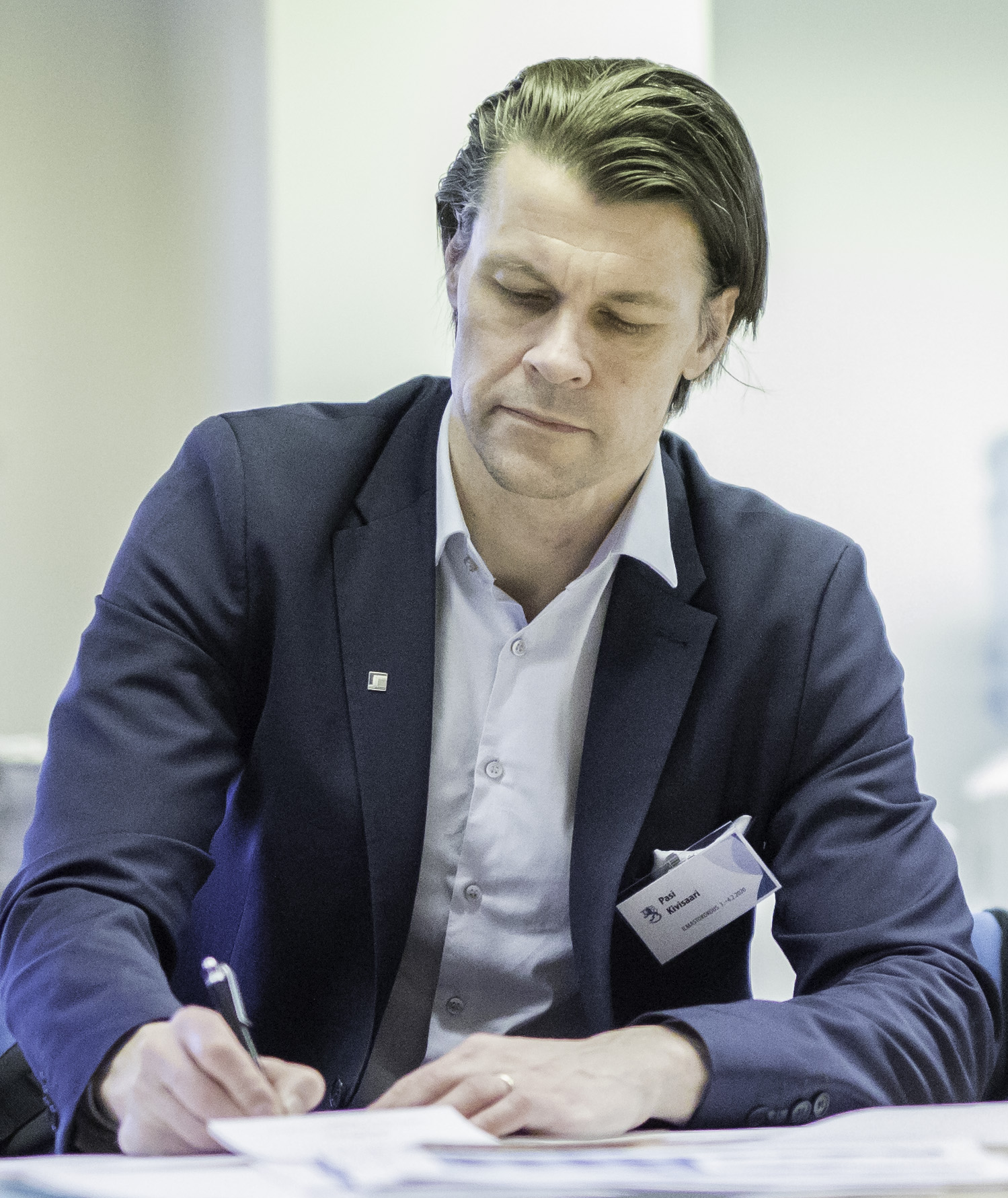

Member of the Finnish Parliament for Vaasa

Personal details
- Born: 23 October 1971 (age 54) Lapua, South Ostrobothnia, Finland
- Party: Centre Party

Pasi Petri Kivisaari (born 23 October 1971 in Lapua) is a Finnish politician currently serving in the Parliament of Finland for the Centre Party at the Vaasa constituency.
