= Hannu Aho =

Finnish agrologist and politician (1947–2024)

Member of the Parliament of Finland for Vaasa
- In office 24 March 1999 – 18 March 2003

Personal details
- Born: 16 March 1947 Perho, Finland
- Died: 19 January 2024 (aged 76) Perho, Finland
- Party: Centre
- Occupation: Agrologist

Hannu Aho (16 March 1947 – 19 January 2024) was a Finnish agrologist and politician. A member of the Centre Party, he served in the Parliament from 1999 to 2003.

Aho died in Perho on 19 January 2024 at the age of 76.
