= Esko Ahonen =

Finnish politician (1955–2025)

Esko Olavi Ahonen (13 June 1955 – 1 June 2025) was a Finnish politician and member of the parliament from the Centre Party. He was born in Evijärvi. He was elected to Parliament of Finland in 2003 for the constituency of Vaasa. In the 2011 election he was dropped out of the parliament. Ahonen died on 1 June 2025, at the age of 69.

== Acts of trust ==
- As a representative member of the South Ostrobothnia district of the Centre Party in the party board
- Chairman of the Board of Directors of Finnish Youth Clubs 2007-2016
