= Akseli Rodén =

Finnish politician (1910–1998)

Aksel (Akseli) Anselm Rodén (24 May 1910 – 1 January 1998) was a Finnish politician, born in Vaasa. He was a member of the Parliament of Finland from 1964 to 1972 and from 1973 to 1975, representing the Social Democratic Party of Finland (SDP). He was a presidential elector in the 1956 Finnish presidential election.
