= Matias Mäkynen =

Finnish politician

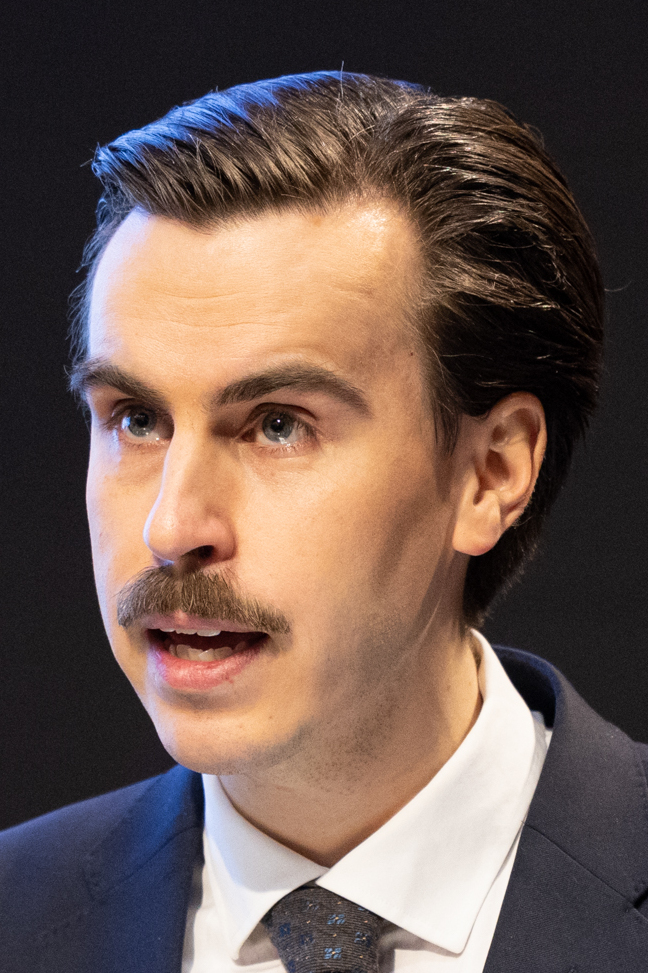
- Mäkynen in 2023

Member of the Finnish Parliament for Vaasa

Personal details
- Born: 1 September 1990 (age 35) Vaasa, Ostrobothnia, Finland
- Party: Social Democratic Party of Finland

Matias Mäkynen (born 1 September 1990 in Vaasa) is a Finnish politician currently serving in the Parliament of Finland for the Social Democratic Party of Finland at the Vaasa constituency. Currently he serves as third deputy chairman of the party.
