= Bror Lillqvist =

Finnish politician

Bror Valdemar Lillqvist (20 November 1918 in Pedersöre – 2 February 1983) was a Finnish tradesman, union representative and politician. He was a member of the Parliament of Finland from 1966 until his death in 1983.
