= Viljo Suokas =

Finnish politician

Viljo Suokas (13 May 1925, Metsäpirtti – 7 June 2012) was a Finnish farmer and politician. He was a Member of the Parliament of Finland, representing the Finnish Rural Party (SMP) from 1970 to 1972 and the Finnish People's Unity Party (SKYP) from 1972 to 1975.
