= Eino Uusitalo =

Finnish politician

Eino Uusitalo

Eino Oskari Uusitalo (1 December 1924 – 19 March 2015) was a Finnish politician from the Centre Party.

Uusitalo was born in Soini, and trained as an agronomist. He was a member of the parliament from 1955 to 1983 from the list of Centre Party. He was Minister of the Interior in the Ahti Karjalainen cabinet in 1971 and the Miettunen, Sorsa and Koivisto cabinets from 1976–1982. He was also Deputy Prime Minister from 1979 to 1982, and acted as a substitute to Prime Minister Koivisto from Autumn 1981 to February 1982, because President Kekkonen was ill and Koivisto was the substitute for Kekkonen. After Koivisto won the presidential election and nominated Kalevi Sorsa as Prime Minister, Uusitalo returned to his position as Minister of the Interior in the cabinet. Uusitalo is remembered mostly because of his proposition to declare 19 September as a second independence day of Finland. That date is the day of Moscow Armistice 1944. Uusitalo fought in the Continuation War 1942–1944 in Metsäpirtti, Karelian Isthmus. In 2015, he died at the age of 90.
