= Veikko Savela =

Finnish politician

Erkki Veikko Savela (28 June 1919 – 16 July 2015) was a Finnish agronomist, farmer and politician. He served as Minister of Transport and Public Works from 13 April 1962 to 18 December 1963. He was a member of the Parliament of Finland from 1958 to 1970, representing the Agrarian League (which changed its name to Centre Party in 1965). He was born in Lappajärvi and died in Seinäjoki.
