= Jukka Mäkynen =

Finnish politician

Member of the Finnish Parliament for Vaasa
- Incumbent
- Assumed office 19 April 2019

Personal details
- Born: April 27, 1961 (age 64) Vaasa, Ostrobothnia, Finland
- Party: Finns Party

Jukka Mäkynen (born 27 April 1961 in Vaasa) is a Finnish politician currently serving in the Parliament of Finland for the Finns Party at the Vaasa constituency. Mäkynen is also a member of the Vaasa city council.

In 2015, Mäkynen was convicted to a five month-long conditional prison sentence for defrauding his mother. In 2017, Mäkynen was also convicted for assault and had to pay compensation to the victim. Due to non-payment, the compensation eventually had to be taken from his parliamentary salary by a public debt collector.
