= Teuva =

Teuva Östermark
- Municipality
- Teuvan kunta Östermarks kommun
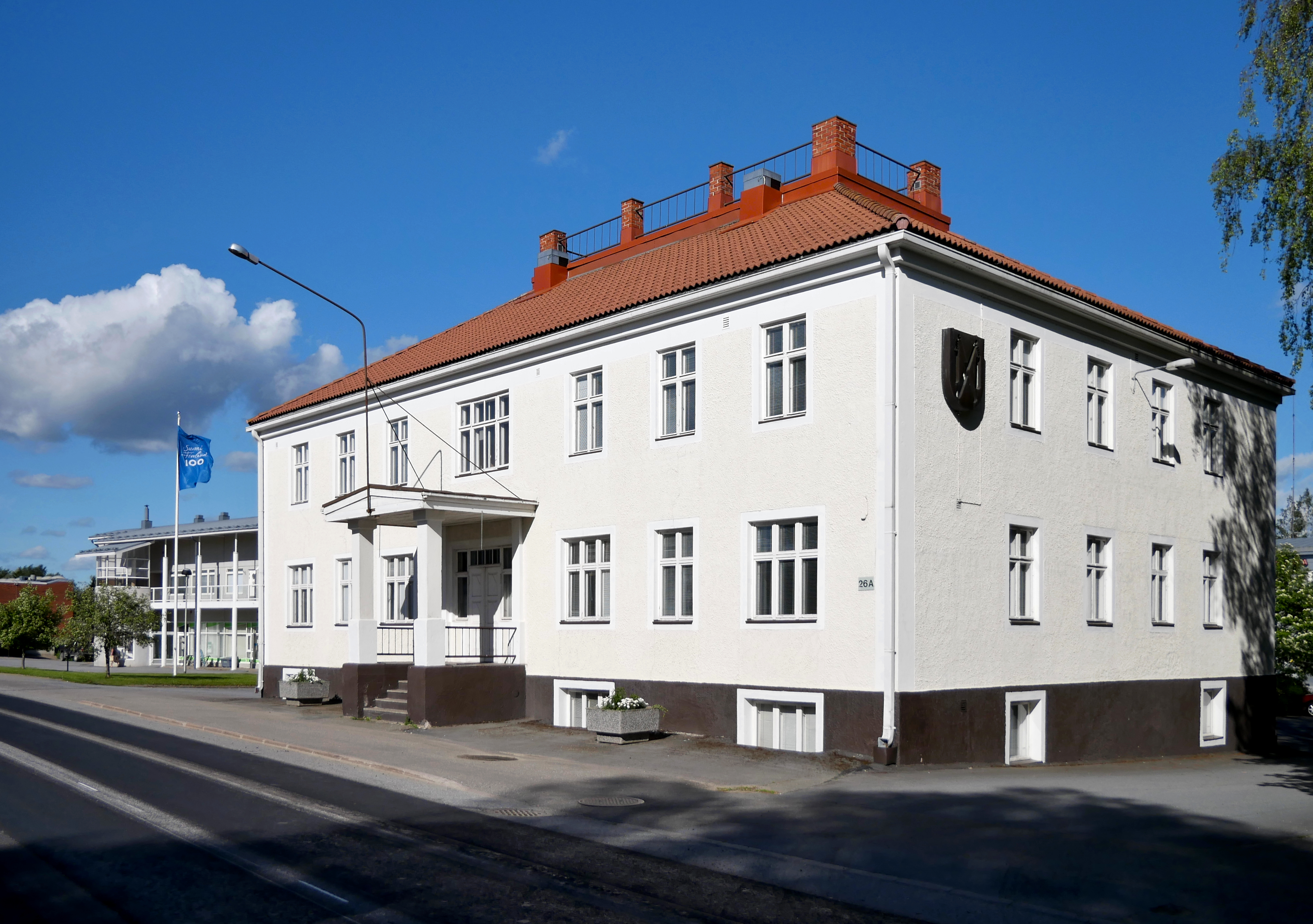
- Municipal office

- Coat of arms

- Location of Teuva in Finland
- Interactive map of Teuva
- Coordinates: 62°29′10″N 21°44′50″E
- Country: Finland
- Region: South Ostrobothnia
- Sub-region: Suupohja
- Charter: 1868

Government
  - Municipal manager: Rami Mattila

Area (2018-01-01)
  - Total: 556.05 km^{2} (214.69 sq mi)
  - Land: 554.73 km^{2} (214.18 sq mi)
  - Water: 1.35 km^{2} (0.52 sq mi)
  - Rank: 154th largest in Finland

Population (2025-12-31)
  - Total: 4,574
  - Rank: 175th largest in Finland
  - Density: 8.25/km^{2} (21.4/sq mi)

Population by native language
  - Finnish: 96.4% (official)
  - Swedish: 0.7%
  - Others: 2.8%

Population by age
  - 0 to 14: 14.1%
  - 15 to 64: 51.6%
  - 65 or older: 34.3%
- Time zone: UTC+02:00 (EET)
  - Summer (DST): UTC+03:00 (EEST)
- Website: teuva.fi

Teuva (Swedish: Östermark) is a municipality of Finland.

It is located in the South Ostrobothnia region. The population of Teuva is 4,574 (31 December 2025) and the municipality covers an area of 554.73 km^{2} (214.18 sq mi) of which 1.35 km^{2} (0.52 sq mi) is inland water (1 January 2018). The population density is 8.25/km^{2} (21.4/sq mi).

The municipality is unilingually Finnish.

== History ==
In 1954, the Finland-Swedish artist and author Tove Jansson created an altarpiece mural, Ten Virgins, in Teuva's church, her only church painting.

In August 2010, more than fifty pocket-sized saunas were gathered on a lakeside within Teuva for the fifth annual Mobile Sauna Festival. Some six-thousand visitors attended the festival, doubling the population of Teuva for the weekend.

== Villages ==
- Horo
- Horonkylä
- Kauppila
- Kirkonkylä
- Komsi
- Korvenkylä
- Luovankylä
- Nori
- Perälä
- Piikkilänkylä
- Riippi
- Salonpää
- Äystö

== Notable individuals ==
- Antti Rajamäki, sprinter
- Aulis Ranta-Muotio, politician
- Elonkerjuu, rock band
- Helge Saarikoski, politician and Member of Parliament
- Jorma Mattinen, professor and rector at the Åbo Akademi University from 2005 to 2014
- Jukka Rauhala, Olympic wrestler
- Lauri Ingman, theologian, bishop, politician and twice Prime Minister of Finland
- Mirjam Tuokkola, archer
- Nicole, a band
- Oiva Ketonen, philosopher, writer, academic and professor
- Otto Syreeni, businessman
- Pauli Nevala, javelin thrower
- Severi Savonen, professor
- Simo Korpela, poet and priest
- Roppal, also known as Riskipiiku, professional Osu! player
