= Mats Nyby =

Finnish politician (1946–2021)

Member of the Parliament of Finland
- In office 1983–1999
- Constituency: Vaasa

Personal details
- Born: 17 November 1946 Jakobstad, Finland
- Died: 11 May 2021 (aged 74) Jakobstad, Finland
- Party: SDP

Mats Nyby (17 November 1946 – 11 May 2021) was a Finnish politician. A member of the Social Democratic Party of Finland (SDP), he served in Parliament from 1983 to 1999.

Nyby was heavily involved in the local politics of his hometown, Jakobstad. He chaired the city council from 1983 to 1996 and was awarded the title of Kaupunkineuvos ('city councilor') by President Tarja Halonen in 2008.

Before moving into politics, Nyby was a schoolteacher in Jakobstad.
