= Toivo Saloranta =

Finnish politician

Toivo Nikolai Saloranta (21 December 1913 – 8 November 2005) was a Finnish farmer and politician. He served as Deputy Minister of Social Affairs from 8 September 1967 to 22 March 1968. Saloranta was born in Kauhajoki, and was a Member of the Parliament of Finland from 1954 to 1958, from 1961 to 1970 and from 1972 to 1975, representing the Agrarian League, which renamed itself the Centre Party in 1965.
