= Mikko Ollikainen =

Finnish politician

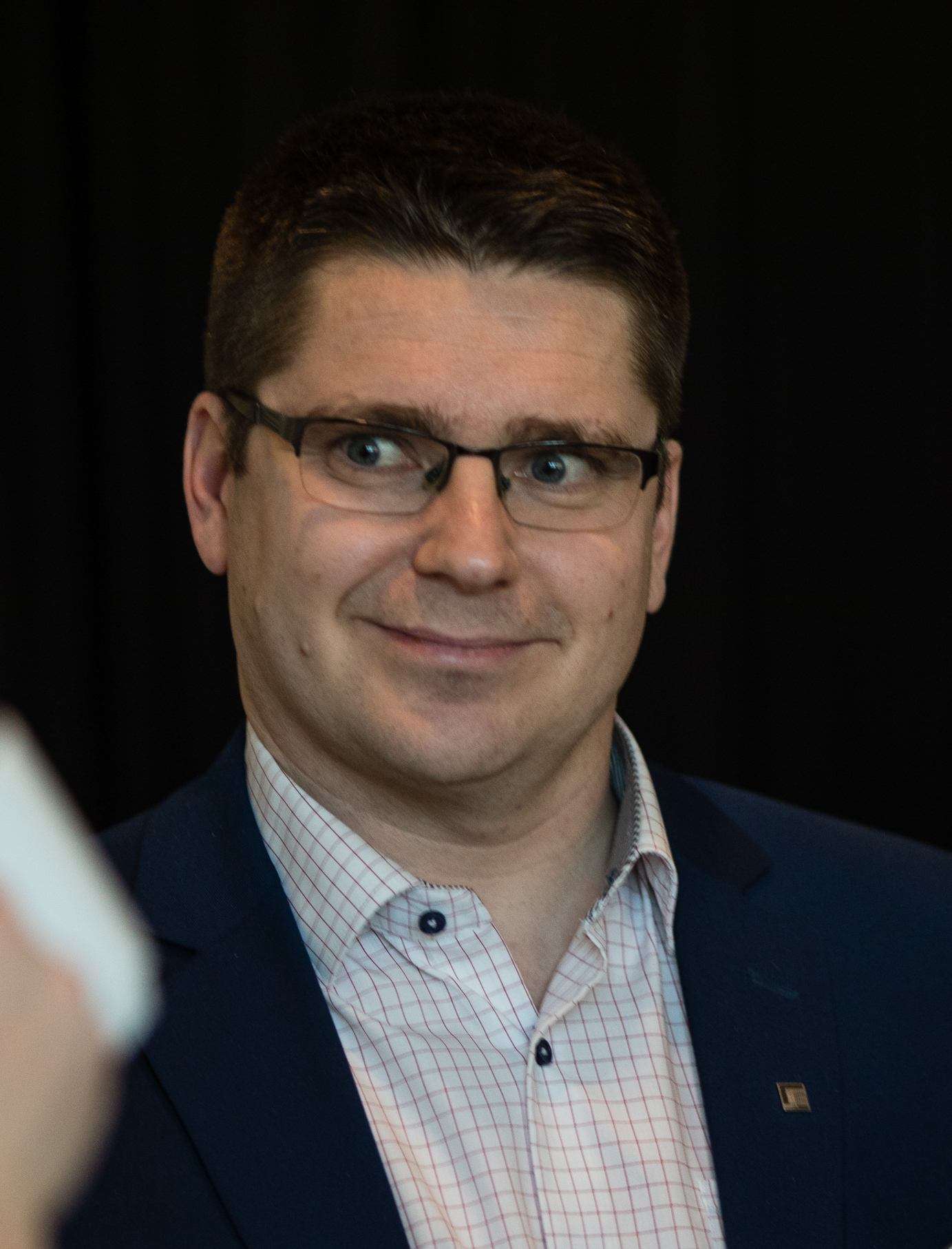
- Ollikainen in 2020

Member of the Finnish Parliament for Vaasa

Personal details
- Born: November 24, 1977 (age 48) Malax, Ostrobothnia, Finland
- Party: Swedish People's Party of Finland

Mikko Karl Antero Ollikainen (born 24 November 1977 in Malax) is a Finnish politician currently serving in the Parliament of Finland for the Swedish People's Party of Finland at the Vaasa constituency.
