= Kari Urpilainen =

Finnish politician (born 1951)

Kari Johannes Urpilainen (born 8 May 1951 in Kokkola) is a Finnish politician. He served as a Member of the Parliament of Finland from 1983 to 1995 and again from 1999 to 2003, representing the Social Democratic Party of Finland (SDP). He is the father of Jutta Urpilainen.
