= Jukka Vihriälä =

Finnish politician (born 1945)

Jukka Pekka Vihriälä (born 1 December 1945 in Vimpeli) is a Finnish agronomist, farmer and politician. He was a member of the Parliament of Finland from 1983 to 2007, representing the Centre Party.
