= Matti Asunmaa =

Finnish politician

Asser Matias (Matti) Asunmaa (11 September 1921, Revonlahti – 1 October 1998) was a Finnish farmer and politician. He was a member of the Parliament of Finland, representing the Finnish Rural Party (SMP) from 1970 to 1972, the Finnish People's Unity Party (SKYP) from 1972 to 1977 and the Centre Party from 1977 to 1979.
