= Aulis Ranta-Muotio =

Finnish politician

Aulis Venneri Ranta-Muotio (born 29 May 1946 in Teuva) is a Finnish agronomist, farmer and politician. He was a member of the Parliament of Finland from 1995 to 2007, representing the Centre Party.
