= Susanna Haapoja =

Finnish politician (1966–2009)

Aino Maria Susanna Haapoja (November 13, 1966 – May 30, 2009) was a Finnish politician in the Centre Party. Haapoja was born in Kauhava and became a Member of Parliament in 2003 and was elected for a second term in 2007. In 2005, she became the chair of the Kauhava city council. She was an agrologist by training.

Haapoja died aged 42 in Tampere after having suffered a cerebral hemorrhage the previous day. Her father, Kalevi Haapoja, is an actor.
