= 1968 Finnish presidential election =

← 1962	15–16 January 1968	1978 →
- Turnout: 70.16%
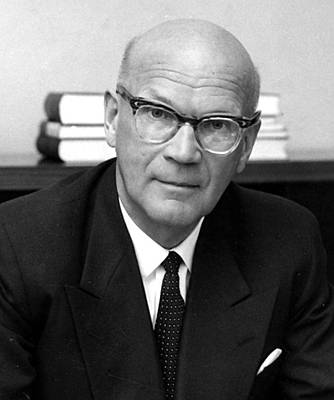

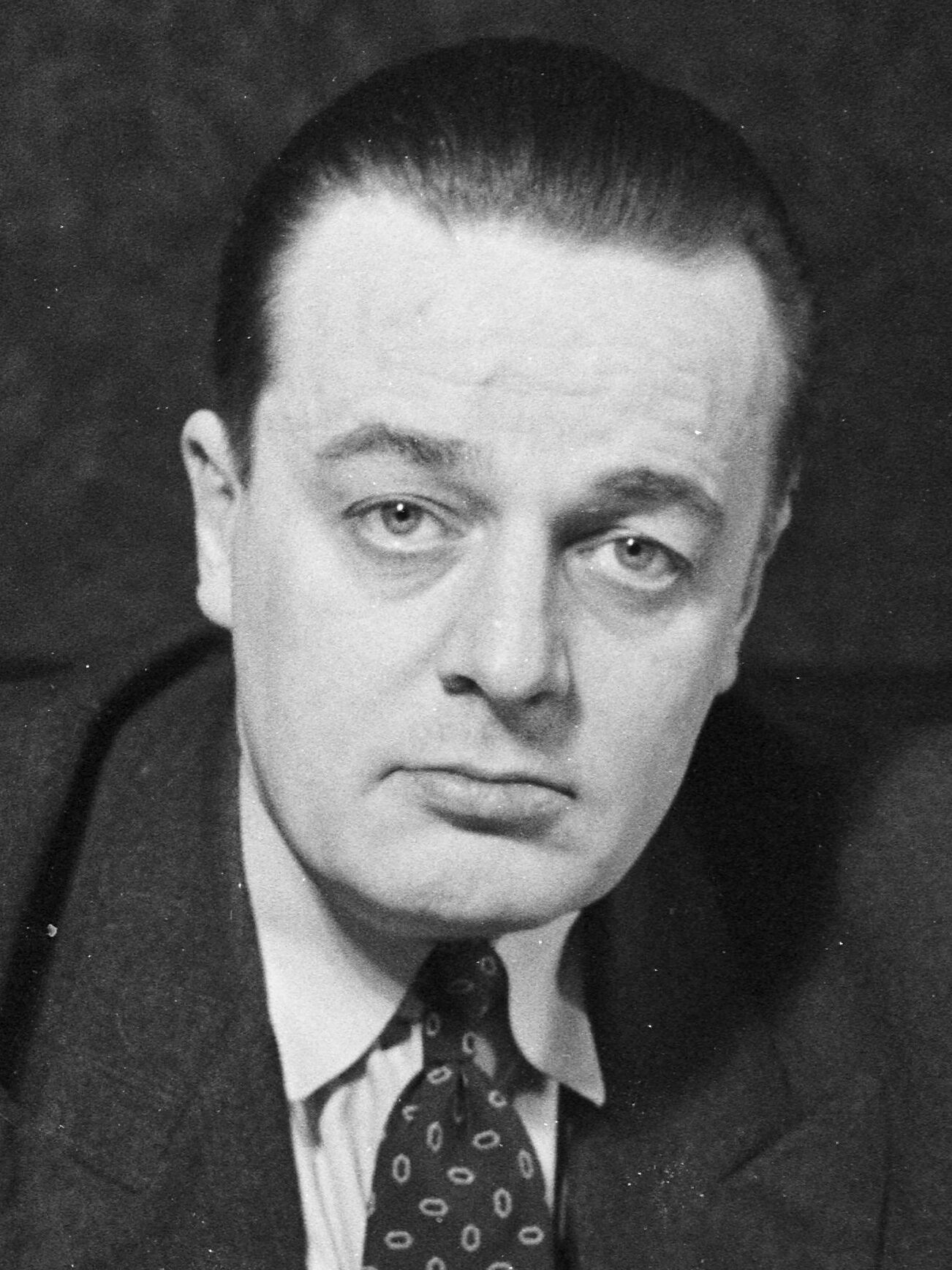

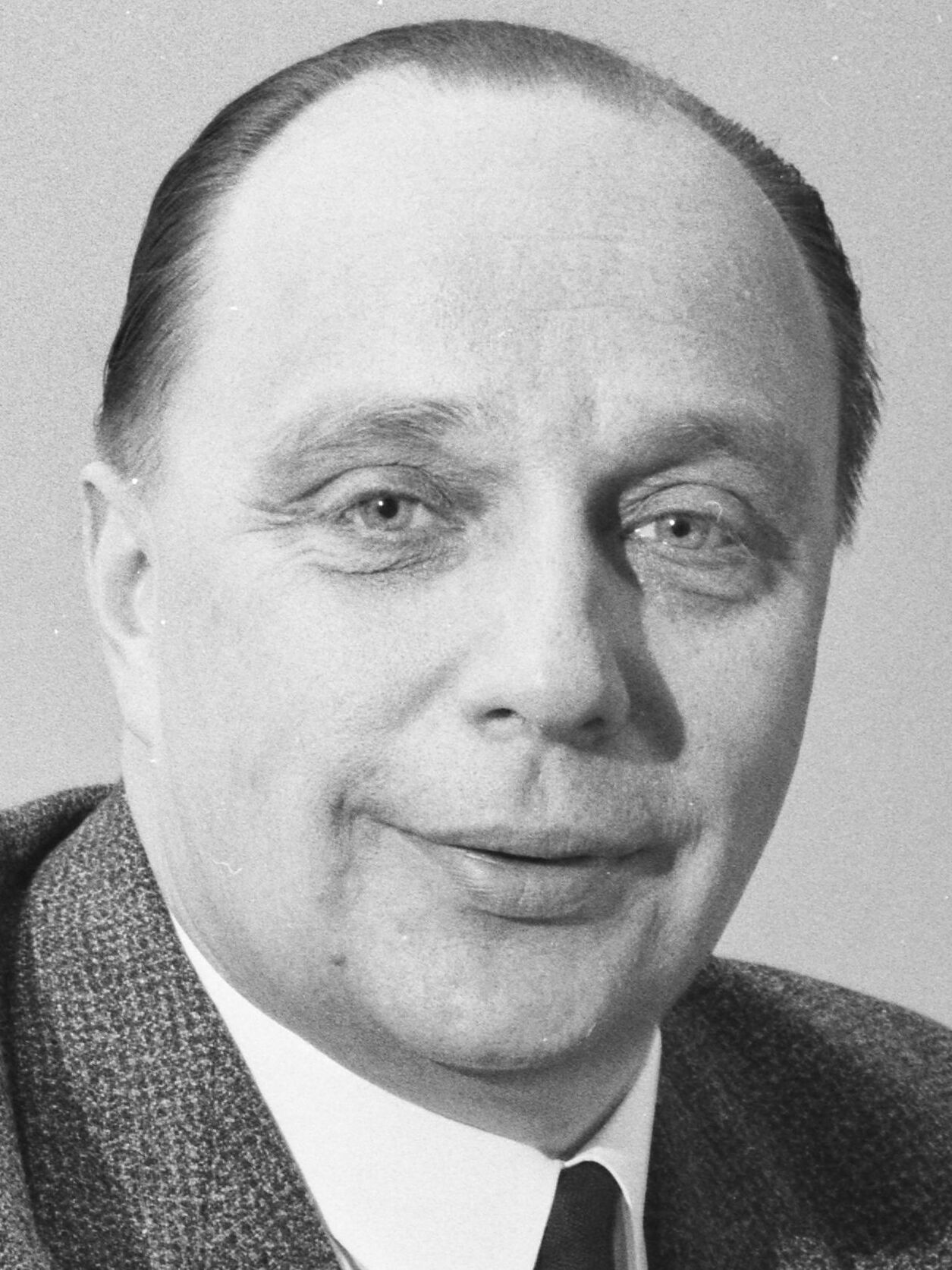
Candidate	Urho Kekkonen	Matti Virkkunen	Veikko Vennamo
Party	Centre	National Coalition	Rural Party
Electoral vote	201	66	33
Popular vote	1,221,078	482,693	231,959
President before election
Urho Kekkonen
Centre
Elected President
Urho Kekkonen
Centre

Two-stage presidential elections were held in Finland in 1968. On 15 and 16 January the public elected presidential electors to an electoral college. They in turn elected the President. The result was a victory for Urho Kekkonen, who won on the first ballot. The turnout for the popular vote was 70%.

Kekkonen's two opponents, the centre-right National Coalition Party's candidate Director of the National Commercial Bank Matti Virkkunen and the populist Finnish Rural Party's leader Veikko Vennamo, criticized him for governing Finland in a too autocratic way.

Vennamo in particular accused Kekkonen of pursuing a too dependent and servile foreign policy towards the Soviet Union. Since almost thirty per cent of the eligible Finnish voters abstained from voting, there was some underlying discontent with the presidential candidates, or Kekkonen's wide lead over his two opponents. Notably, the National Coalitioners and Ruralists - both opposition parties at the time - gained clearly higher percentages of the popular vote than in the 1966 Finnish parliamentary elections. This foreshadowed their major gains in the 1970 Finnish parliamentary elections. Although during this presidential campaign, Kekkonen promised not to run for president again, however, he extended his presidential term in 1973 and ran nearly unopposed in 1978.

== Results ==
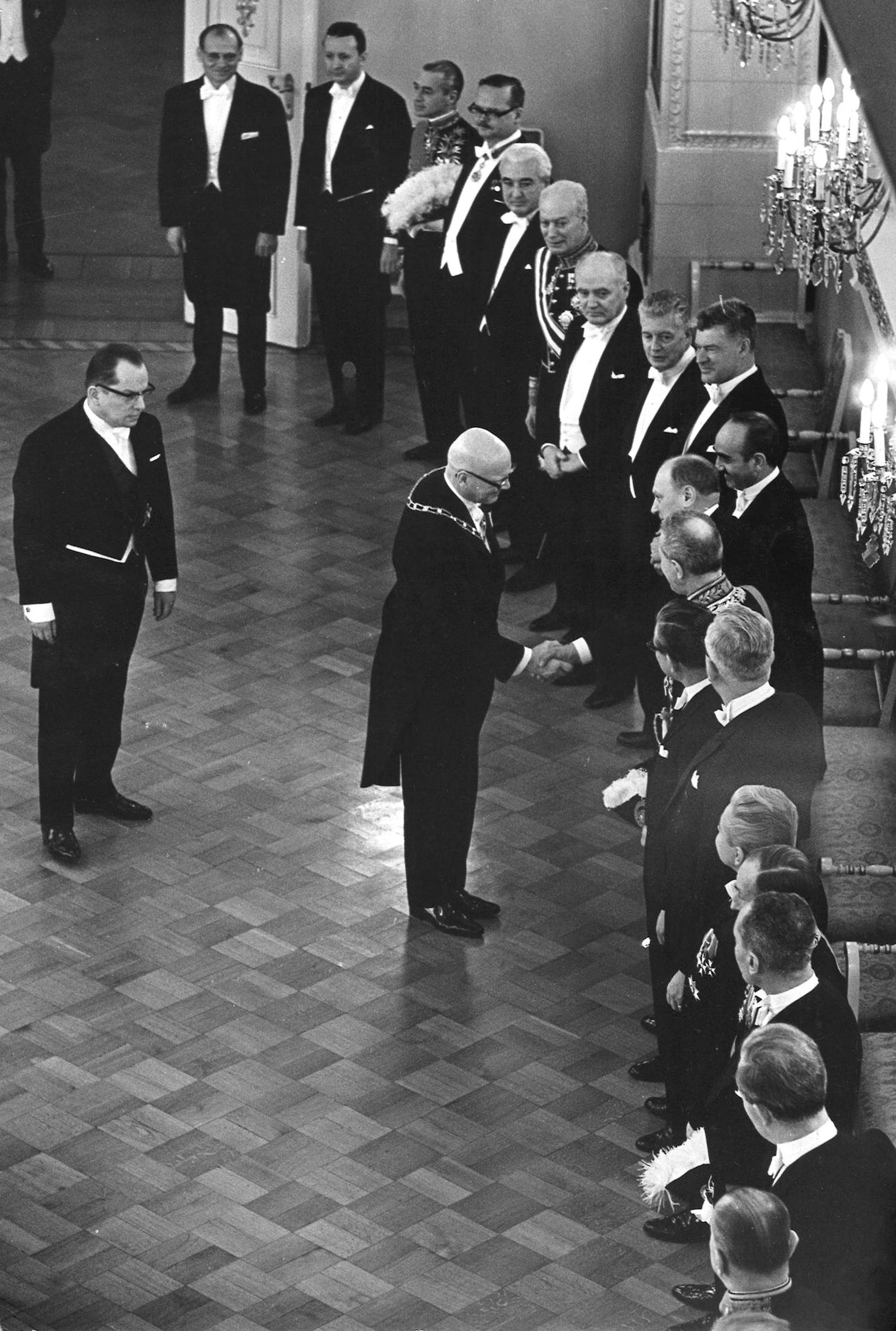
Inauguration ceremony for the Urho Kekkonen presidency in 1968. Here the President meets the representants of diplomats. Behind him, the Prime minister Ahti Karjalainen

=== Popular vote ===
Party or alliance		Votes	%	Seats
Electoral Union of Urho Kekkonen	Centre Party	421,197	20.66	65
Electoral Union of Urho Kekkonen	Finnish People's Democratic League	345,609	16.95	56
Electoral Union of Urho Kekkonen	Social Democratic Party	315,068	15.46	55
Electoral Union of Urho Kekkonen	Social Democratic Union of Workers and Smallholders	46,833	2.30	6
Electoral Union of Urho Kekkonen	Swedish People's Party	2,568	0.13	0
Electoral Union of Urho Kekkonen	Independents	21,425	1.05	1
Electoral Union of Urho Kekkonen	Total	1,152,700	56.54	183
Electoral Union of Matti Virkkunen	National Coalition Party	432,014	21.19	58
Electoral Union of Matti Virkkunen	Independents	6,787	0.33	2
Electoral Union of Matti Virkkunen	Total	438,801	21.52	60
Electoral Union of Veikko Vennamo		231,282	11.35	33
Electoral Union of SFP	Supporters of Urho Kekkonen	68,378	3.35	9
Electoral Union of SFP	Supporters of Matti Virkkunen	43,892	2.15	6
Electoral Union of SFP	Supporters of Veikko Vennamo	677	0.03	0
Electoral Union of SFP	Total	112,947	5.54	15
Electoral Union of LKP		102,831	5.04	9
Others		31	0.00	0
Total		2,038,592	100.00	300
Valid votes		2,038,592	99.49	
Invalid/blank votes		10,410	0.51	
Total votes		2,049,002	100.00	
Registered voters/turnout		2,920,635	70.16	
Source: Nohln & Stöver

=== Electoral college ===
Candidate	Party	Votes	%
Urho Kekkonen	Centre Party	201	67.00
Matti Virkkunen	National Coalition Party	66	22.00
Veikko Vennamo	Finnish Rural Party	33	11.00
Total		300	100.00
Source: Nohlen & Stöver
