= Lapland (parliamentary electoral district) =

Electoral district of the Parliament of Finland

- Constituency for the Eduskunta
- Municipality: List: Enontekiö; Inari; Kemi; Kemijärvi; Keminmaa; Kittilä; Kolari; Muonio; Pelkosenniemi; Pello; Posio; Ranua; Rovaniemi; Salla; Savukoski; Simo; Sodankylä; Tervola; Tornio; Utsjoki; Ylitornio
- Region: Lapland
- Population: 175,795 (2022)
- Electorate: 159,503 (2023)
- Area: 92,678 km^{2} (2022)

Current constituency
- Created: 1939
- Seats: List: 6 (2023–present); 7 (2003–2019); 8 (1979–1999); 9 (1970–1975); 10 (1966); 9 (1954–1962); 8 (1945–1951); 7 (1939)
- Members: List: Katri Kulmuni (Kesk); Markus Lohi (Kesk); Sara Seppänen (PS); Kaisa Juuso (PS); Heikki Autto (Kok; Johanna Ojala-Niemelä (SDP)

Lapland is a Finnish constituency represented in the eduskunta. It covers the administrative region of Lapland, with a population, as of its most recent accessible calculation in 2022, of 176,151. Lapland currently elects six members to the eduskunta.The constituency is largely rural, and the only cities in the area are small. Thus, the dominant party has traditionally been the rural Centre Party. The second party that holds major influence in the area is the SKDL/Left Alliance. The other two major Finnish parties, the social democratic SDP and conservative NCP have usually received one of the seats in the constituency. The NCP has often allied with the Christian Democrats.

== History ==
Lapland Province was separated from Oulu Province in 1938 and the electoral district was created from the previous Oulu electoral district in 1939.

== Electoral system ==
Lapland currently elects 6 of the 200 members of the Parliament of Finland using the open party-list proportional representation electoral system. Parties may form electoral alliances with each other to pool their votes and increase their chances of winning seats. However, the number of candidates nominated by an electoral alliance may not exceed the maximum number of candidates that a single party may nominate. Seats are allocated using the D'Hondt method.

== Members of Parliament ==
Election	Member (Party)	Member (Party)	Member (Party)	Member (Party)	Member (Party)	Member (Party)	Member (Party)
March 2003	Jari Vilén (National Coalition)	Hannes Manninen (Centre)	Simo Rundgren (Centre)	Hannu Takkula (Centre)	Esko-Juhani Tennilä (Left Alliance)	Maija Rask (Social Democrats)	Markus Mustajärvi (Left Alliance)
March 2007	Ulla Karvo (National Coalition)	Hannes Manninen (Centre)	Paavo Väyrynen (Centre)	Janne Seurujärvi (Centre)	Esko-Juhani Tennilä (Left Alliance)	Johanna Ojala-Niemelä (Social Democrats)	Markus Mustajärvi (Left Alliance)
April 2011	Heikki Autto (National Coalition)	Markus Lohi (Centre)	Simo Rundgren (Centre)	Eeva-Maria Maijala (Centre)	Hanna Mäntylä (True Finns)	Johanna Ojala-Niemelä (Social Democrats)	Markus Mustajärvi (Left Alliance)
April 2015	Katri Kulmuni (Centre)	Markus Lohi (Centre)	Paavo Väyrynen (Centre)	Eeva-Maria Maijala (Centre)	Hanna Mäntylä (True Finns)	Johanna Ojala-Niemelä (Social Democrats)	Markus Mustajärvi (Left Alliance)
April 2015 co-option	Katri Kulmuni (Centre)	Markus Lohi (Centre)	Mikko Kärnä (Centre)	Eeva-Maria Maijala (Centre)	Hanna Mäntylä (True Finns)	Johanna Ojala-Niemelä (Social Democrats)	Markus Mustajärvi (Left Alliance)
July 2017 co-option	Katri Kulmuni (Centre)	Markus Lohi (Centre)	Mikko Kärnä (Centre)	Eeva-Maria Maijala (Centre)	Matti Torvinen (Blue Reform)	Johanna Ojala-Niemelä (Social Democrats)	Markus Mustajärvi (Left Alliance)
June 2018 co-option	Katri Kulmuni (Centre)	Markus Lohi (Centre)	Paavo Väyrynen (Citizens' Party)	Eeva-Maria Maijala (Centre)	Matti Torvinen (Blue Reform)	Johanna Ojala-Niemelä (Social Democrats)	Markus Mustajärvi (Left Alliance)
April 2019	Katri Kulmuni (Centre)	Markus Lohi (Centre)	Mikko Kärnä (Centre)	Heikki Autto (National Coalition)	Kaisa Juuso (Finns Party)	Johanna Ojala-Niemelä (Social Democrats)	Markus Mustajärvi (Left Alliance)
April 2023	Katri Kulmuni (Centre)	Markus Lohi (Centre)	Sara Seppänen (Finns Party)	Heikki Autto (National Coalition)	Kaisa Juuso (Finns Party)	Johanna Ojala-Niemelä (Social Democrats)	Seat abolished 6 seats

== Election results ==
=== Summary ===
Election	Left Alliance Vas / SKDL / STPV / SSTP			Green League Vihr			Social Democrats SDP / SDTP / SDP			Swedish People's SFP			Centre Kesk / ML			Liberals Lib / LKP / SK / KE / NP			National Coalition Kok / SP			Christian Democrats KD / SKL			Finns PS / SMP / SPP		
Election	Votes	%	Seats	Votes	%	Seats	Votes	%	Seats	Votes	%	Seats	Votes	%	Seats	Votes	%	Seats	Votes	%	Seats	Votes	%	Seats	Votes	%	Seats
2023	9,731	9.94%	0	3,386	3.46%	0	17,685	18.06%	1	297	0.30%	0	24,321	24.84%	2				11,978	12.23%	1	1,075	1.10%	0	26,199	26.76%	2
2019	14,128	14.16%	1	9,706	9.72%	0	13,479	13.51%	1	112	0.11%	0	29,145	29.20%	3				11,243	11.26%	1	1,077	1.08%	0	17,160	17.19%	1
2015	13,827	13.71%	1	2,643	2.62%	0	10,943	10.85%	1	470	0.47%	0	43,293	42.92%	4				10,155	10.07%	0	1,112	1.10%	0	16,621	16.48%	1
2011	16,634	16.74%	1	3,408	3.43%	0	11,747	11.82%	1				32,011	32.22%	3				12,466	12.55%	1	1,626	1.64%	0	20,336	20.47%	1
2007	22,353	23.09%	2	3,104	3.21%	0	14,595	15.08%	1				41,711	43.15%	3				11,525	11.91%	1	941	0.97%	0	1,732	1.79%	0
2003	26,067	25.57%	2	2,152	2.11%	0	14,732	14.45%	1	221	0.22%	0	45,696	44.83%	3	129	0.13%	0	10,406	10.21%	2	844	0.83%	0	164	0.16%	0
1999	28,093	27.08%	2	1,847	1.07%	1	13,875	13.37%	1				44,432	42.83%	4				10,356	9.98%	1	1,315	1.27%	0	558	0.54%	0
1995	28,126	25.62%	2	2,604	2.37%	0	20,744	18.89%	1				42,895	38.81%	4	275	0.25%	0	9,863	8.98%	1	1,571	1.43%	0	1,010	0.92%	0
1991	22,562	19.76%	2	3,977	3.48%	0	15,933	13.95%	1				56,850	49.79%	5	461	0.40%	0	10,092	8.84%	0	1,177	1.03%	0	2,208	1.93%	0
1987	19,392	16.23%	3	2,590	2.17%	0	16,171	13.54%	1				45,249	37.88%	4	707	0.59%	0	14,214	11.90%	1	1,375	1.15%	0	4,685	3.92%	0
1983	19,477	15.64%	1				21,073	16.91%	1				47,455	38.10%	4				14,946	12.00%	1	1,090	0.88%	0	5,003	4.02%	0
1979	38,214	31.44%	3				15,559	12.80%	1				42,311	34.80%	3	5,460	4.49%	0	14,092	11.60%	1	2,142	1.76%	0	2,730	2.25%	0
1975	36,784	31.83%	3				16,984	14.70%	1				37,148	32.15%	4	4,815	4.17%	0	11,924	10.32%	1	1,237	1.07%	0	2,941	2.55%	0
1972	30,958	29.46%	3				13,725	13.06%	1				30,541	29.06%	3	6,427	6.10%	0	10,935	10.41%	1	912	0.87%	0	11,329	10.78%	1
1970	29,041	28.11%	3				12,590	12.19%	1				29,609	28.66%	3	8,891	8.61%	0	9,723	9.41%	1				12,849	12.44%	1
1966	34,987	35.10%	4				14,306	14.35%	1				33,515	33.62%	4	7,818	7.84%	1	7,971	8.00%	0						
1962	32,425	33.88%	3				7,854	8.21%	0				35,325	36.91%	4	7,886	8.24%	1	8,643	9.03%	1				1,509	1.58%	0
1958	29,498	36.93%	4				9,807	12.28%	1				28,115	35.19%	3	3,056	3.83%	0	7,076	8.86%	1						
1954	25,734	33.24%	3				9,987	12.90%	1				31,025	40.08%	4	2,766	3.57%	0	7,892	10.19%	1						
1951	23,358	33.72%	3				9,421	13.60%	1				26,238	37.87%	3	2,274	3.28%	0	7,974	11.51%	1						
1948	18,683	29.66%	2				8,900	14.13%	1				25,870	41.07%	4	718	1.14%	0	8,645	13.44%	1						
1945	13,502	27.66%	2				6,949	14.23%	1				20,631	42.26%	4	1,259	2.58%	0	6,001	12.29%	1						
1939							10,692	29.09%	2				19,184	52.19%	5	948	2.58%	0	2,977	8.10%	0						

(Figures in italics represent joint lists.)

=== Detailed ===
==== 2020s ====
===== 2023 =====
Results of the 2023 parliamentary election held on 2 April 2023:

Party		Party			Electoral Alliance		
Party		Votes	%	Seats	Votes	%	Seats
Finns Party	PS	26,199	26.76%	2	26,199	26.76%	2
Centre Party	Kesk	24,321	24.84%	2	24,321	24.84%	2
Social Democratic Party of Finland	SDP	17,685	18.06%	1	17,685	18.06%	1
National Coalition Party	Kok	11,978	12.23%	1	13,053	13.33%	1
Christian Democrats	KD	1,075	1.10%	0	13,053	13.33%	1
Left Alliance	Vas	9,731	9.94%	0	9,731	9.94%	0
Green League	Vihr	3,386	3.46%	0	3,386	3.46%	0
Lapland's Non-Aligned Joint List		1,231	1.26%	0	1,231	1.26%	0
Freedom Alliance	VL	693	0.71%	0	693	0.71%	0
Movement Now	Liik	640	0.65%	0	640	0.65%	0
Power Belongs to the People	VKK	299	0.31%	0	299	0.31%	0
Swedish People's Party of Finland	SFP	297	0.30%	0	297	0.30%	0
Communist Party of Finland	SKP	172	0.18%	0	172	0.18%	0
Liberal Party – Freedom to Choose	Lib	161	0.16%	0	161	0.16%	0
The Open Party		36	0.4%	0	36	0.4%	0
Valid votes		97,904	100.00%	6	97,904	100.00%	6
Rejected votes		511	0.52%				
Total polled		98,415	61.70%				
Registered electors		159,503					

The following candidates were elected:

▌Heikki Autto (Kok), 7,185 votes; ▌Kaisa Juuso (PS), 6,078 votes; ▌Katri Kulmuni (Kesk), 8,397 votes; ▌Markus Lohi (Kesk), 4,636 votes; ▌Johanna Ojala-Niemelä (SDP), 7,110 votes; ▌Sara Seppänen (PS), 11,153 votes.

==== 2010s ====
===== 2019 =====
Results of the 2019 parliamentary election held on 14 April 2019:

Party		Party			Electoral Alliance		
Party		Votes	%	Seats	Votes	%	Seats
Centre Party	Kesk	29,145	29.20%	3	29,145	29.20%	3
Finns Party	PS	17,160	17.19%	1	17,160	17.19%	1
Left Alliance	Vas	14,128	14.16%	1	14,128	14.16%	1
Social Democratic Party of Finland	SDP	13,479	13.51%	1	13,479	13.51%	1
National Coalition Party	Kok	11,243	11.26%	1	12,432	12.46%	1
Christian Democrats	KD	1,077	1.08%	0	12,432	12.46%	1
Swedish People's Party of Finland	SFP	112	0.11%	0	12,432	12.46%	1
Green League	Vihr	9,706	9.72%	0	9,706	9.72%	0
Movement Now	Liik	1,991	1.99%	0	1,991	1.99%	0
Seven Star Movement	TL	667	0.67%	0	667	0.67%	0
Blue Reform	SIN	483	0.48%	0	483	0.48%	0
Pirate Party	Pir	280	0.28%	0	280	0.28%	0
Communist Party of Finland	SKP	150	0.15%	0	150	0.15%	0
Feminist Party	FP	121	0.12%	0	121	0.12%	0
Communist Workers' Party – For Peace and Socialism	KTP	35	0.04%	0	35	0.04%	0
Independence Party	IPU	30	0.03%	0	30	0.03%	0
Valid votes		99,807	100.00%	7	99,807	100.00%	7
Rejected votes		689	0.69%				
Total polled		100,496	62.40%				
Registered electors		161,059					

The following candidates were elected: ▌Heikki Autto (Kok), 5,467 votes; ▌Kaisa Juuso (PS), 5,767 votes; ▌Katri Kulmuni (Kesk), 8,423 votes; ▌Mikko Kärnä (Kesk), 6,480 votes; ▌Markus Lohi (Kesk), 4,969 votes; ▌Markus Mustajärvi (Vas), 5,528 votes; ▌Johanna Ojala-Niemelä (SDP), 6,719 votes.

===== 2015 =====
Results of the 2015 parliamentary election held on 19 April 2015:

Party		Party			Electoral Alliance		
Party		Votes	%	Seats	Votes	%	Seats
Centre Party	Kesk	43,293	42.92%	4	43,293	42.92%	4
True Finns	PS	16,621	16.48%	1	17,733	17.58%	1
Christian Democrats	KD	1,112	1.10%	0	17,733	17.58%	1
Left Alliance	Vas	13,827	13.71%	1	13,827	13.71%	1
Social Democratic Party of Finland	SDP	10,943	10.85%	1	10,943	10.85%	1
National Coalition Party	Kok	10,155	10.07%	0	10,155	10.07%	0
Green League	Vihr	2,643	2.62%	0	2,643	2.62%	0
Pirate Party	Pir	818	0.81%	0	818	0.81%	0
Swedish People's Party of Finland	SFP	470	0.47%	0	470	0.47%	0
Independence Party	IPU	446	0.44%	0	446	0.44%	0
Communist Party of Finland	SKP	285	0.28%	0	285	0.28%	0
Change 2011		219	0.22%	0	219	0.22%	0
Workers' Party of Finland	STP	39	0.04%	0	39	0.04%	0
Valid votes		100,871	100.00%	7	100,871	100.00%	7
Rejected votes		587	0.58%				
Total polled		101,458	62.34%				
Registered electors		162,906					

The following candidates were elected: ▌Katri Kulmuni (Kesk), 9,702 votes; ▌Markus Lohi (Kesk), 4,793 votes; ▌Eeva-Maria Maijala (Kesk), 5,515 votes; ▌Markus Mustajärvi (Vas), 5,743 votes; ▌Hanna Mäntylä (PS), 8,072 votes; ▌Johanna Ojala-Niemelä (SDP), 6,248 votes; ▌Paavo Väyrynen (Kesk), 6,889 votes.

===== 2011 =====
Results of the 2011 parliamentary election held on 17 April 2011:

Party		Party			Electoral Alliance		
Party		Votes	%	Seats	Votes	%	Seats
Centre Party	Kesk	32,011	32.22%	3	32,011	32.22%	3
True Finns	PS	20,336	20.47%	1	20,336	20.47%	1
Left Alliance	Vas	16,634	16.74%	1	16,634	16.74%	1
National Coalition Party	Kok	12,466	12.55%	1	12,466	12.55%	1
Social Democratic Party of Finland	SDP	11,747	11.82%	1	11,747	11.82%	1
Green League	Vihr	3,408	3.43%	0	3,408	3.43%	0
Christian Democrats	KD	1,626	1.64%	0	1,626	1.64%	0
Communist Party of Finland	SKP	267	0.05%	0	501	0.10%	0
Communist Workers' Party – For Peace and Socialism	KTP	234	0.04%	0	501	0.10%	0
Swedish People's Party of Finland	SFP	426	0.43%	0	426	0.43%	0
Change 2011		124	0.12%	0	124	0.12%	0
Freedom Party – Finland's Future	VP	53	0.05%	0	53	0.05%	0
Workers' Party of Finland	STP	25	0.03%	0	25	0.03%	0
Valid votes		99,357	100.00%	7	507,189	100.00%	7
Rejected votes		693	0.70%				
Total polled		100,050	61.15%				
Registered electors		163,623					

The following candidates were elected: ▌Heikki Autto (Kok), 5,025 votes; ▌Markus Lohi (Kesk), 3,615 votes; ▌Eeva-Maria Maijala (Kesk), 4,692 votes; ▌Markus Mustajärvi (Vas), 7,621 votes; ▌Hanna Mäntylä (PS), 3,064 votes; ▌Johanna Ojala-Niemelä (SDP), 7,052 votes; ▌Simo Rundgren (Kesk), 3,825 votes.

==== 2000s ====
===== 2007 =====
Results of the 2007 parliamentary election held on 18 March 2007:

Party		Party			Electoral Alliance		
Party		Votes	%	Seats	Votes	%	Seats
Centre Party	Kesk	41,771	43.2%	3	42,712	0.0%	3
Christian Democrats	KD	941	1.0%	0	42,712	0.0%	3
Left Alliance	Vas	22,353	23.1%	2	22,353	23.1%	2
National Coalition Party	Kok	11,525	11.9%	1	14,629	0.0%	1
Green League	Vihr	3,104	3.2%	0	14,629	0.0%	1
Social Democratic Party of Finland	SDP	14,595	15.1%	1	14,595	15.1%	1
True Finns	PS	1,732	1.8%	0	1,931	0.0%	0
Independence Party	IPU	50	0.1%	0	1,931	0.0%	0
For the Poor		149	0.2%	0	1,931	0.0%	0
Communist Workers' Party – For Peace and Socialism	KTP	341	0.4%	0	341	0.4%	0
Communist Party of Finland	SKP	216	0.2%	0	216	0.2%	0
Workers' Party of Finland	STP	18	0.0%	0	18	0.0%	0
Valid votes		96,795	100.00%	7	96,795	100.00%	7
Rejected votes		647	0.7%				
Total polled		97,442	60.03%				
Registered electors		162,315					

The following candidates were elected: ▌Ulla Karvo (Kok), 4,634 votes; ▌Hannes Manninen (Kesk), 5,548 votes; ▌Markus Mustajärvi (Vas), 7,675 votes; ▌Johanna Ojala-Niemelä (SDP), 6,252 votes; ▌Janne Seurujärvi (Kesk), 5,341 votes; ▌Esko-Juhani Tennilä (Vas), 7,739 votes; ▌Paavo Väyrynen (Kesk), 10,944 votes.

===== 2003 =====
Results of the 2003 parliamentary election held on 16 March 2003:

Party		Party			Electoral Alliance		
Party		Votes	%	Seats	Votes	%	Seats
Centre Party	Kesk	45,696	44.8%	3	45,696	44.8%	3
Left Alliance	Vas	26,067	25.6%	2	26,067	25.6%	2
Social Democratic Party of Finland	SDP	14,732	14.5%	1	14,732	14.5%	1
National Coalition Party	Kok	10,406	10.2%	1	11,543	11.3%	1
Christian Democrats	KD	844	0.8%	0	11,543	11.3%	1
True Finns	PS	164	0.2%	0	11,543	11.3%	1
Liberals	Lib	129	0.1%	0	11,543	11.3%	1
Green League	Vihr	2,152	2.1%	0	2,152	2.1%	0
Forces for Change in Finland		727	0.7%	0	727	0.7%	0
Communist Party of Finland	SKP	339	0.3%	0	339	0.3%	0
Communist Workers' Party – For Peace and Socialism	KTP	325	0.3%	0	325	0.3%	0
Swedish People's Party of Finland	SFP	221	0.2%	0	221	0.2%	0
Pensioners for People		128	0.1%	0	128	0.1%	0
Valid votes		101,930	100.00%	7	101,930	100.00%	7
Rejected votes		936	0.92%				
Total polled		102,866	63.35%				
Registered electors		162,372					

The following candidates were elected: ▌Hannes Manninen (Kesk), 4,288 votes; ▌Markus Mustajärvi (Vas), 4,895 votes; ▌Maija Rask (SDP), 7,030 votes; ▌Simo Rundgren (Kesk), 5,353; ▌Hannu Takkula (Kesk), 10,937 votes; ▌Esko-Juhani Tennilä (Vas), 10,580 votes; ▌Jari Vilén (Kok), 5,874 votes.

==== 1990s ====
===== 1999 =====
Results of the 1999 parliamentary election held on 21 March 1999:

Party		Party			Electoral Alliance		
Party		Votes	%	Seats	Votes	%	Seats
Centre Party	Kesk	44,432	42.83%	4	44,432	42.83%	4
Left Alliance	Vas	28,093	27.08%	2	28,093	27.08%	2
Social Democratic Party of Finland	SDP	13,875	13.37%	1	13,875	13.37%	1
National Coalition Party	Kok	10,356	9.98%	1	12,229	11.79%	1
Finnish Christian League	SKL	1,315	1.27%	0	12,229	11.79%	1
True Finns	PS	558	0.54%	0	12,229	11.79%	1
Green League	Vihr	1,847	1.07%	0	1,847	1.78%	0
Finland: Non-EU Joint List		1,106	1.07%	0	1,106	1.07%	0
Communist Party of Finland	SKP	405	0.39%	0	706	0.68%	0
Communist Workers' Party – For Peace and Socialism	KTP	209	0.20%	0	706	0.68%	0
Kirjava ”Puolue” – Elonkehän Puolesta	KIPU	92	0.09%	0	706	0.68%	0
Reform Group	Rem	636	0.61%	0	676	0.65%	0
Alliance for Free Finland	VSL	40	0.04%	0	676	0.65%	0
Swedish People's Party of Finland	SFP	286	0.28%	0	286	0.28%	0
Sitoutumattomat 2000		222	0.21%	0	222	0.21%	0
Pensioners for People	EKA	158	0.15%	0	158	0.15%	0
Natural Law Party	LLP	119	0.11%	0	119	0.11%	0
Valid votes		103,749	100.00%	8	103,749	100.00%	8
Rejected votes		922	0.88%				
Total polled		104,671	63.11%				
Registered electors		165,856					

The following candidates were elected: ▌Maria Kaisa Aula (Kesk), 6,722 votes; ▌Ossi Korteniemi (Kesk), 5,031 votes; ▌Hannes Manninen (Kesk), 4,973 votes; ▌Matti Huutola (Vas), 3,435 votes; ▌Maija Rask (SDP), 5,230 votes; ▌Hannu Takkula (Kesk), 11,978 votes; ▌Esko-Juhani Tennilä (Vas), 13,713 votes; ▌Jari Vilén (Kok), 2,892 votes.

===== 1995 =====
Results of the 1995 parliamentary election held on 19 March 1995:

Party		Party			Electoral Alliance		
Party		Votes	%	Seats	Votes	%	Seats
Centre Party	Kesk	42,895	40.24%	4	44,180	40.24%	4
Finnish Rural Party	SMP	1,010	0.92%	0	44,180	40.24%	4
Liberal People's Party	LKP	275	0.25%	0	44,180	40.24%	4
Left Alliance	Vas	28,126	25.62%	2	28,126	25.62%	2
Social Democratic Party of Finland	SDP	20,744	18.89%	1	20,744	18.89%	1
National Coalition Party	Kok	9,863	8.98%	1	11,434	10.41%	1
Finnish Christian League	SKL	1,571	1.43%	0	11,434	10.41%	1
Green League	Vihr	2,604	2.37%	0	2,604	2.37%	0
Young Finns	Nuor	1,176	1.07%	0	1,176	1.07%	0
Kristina Lummi (Independent)		645	0.59%	0	645	0.59%	0
Alliance for Free Finland	VSL	545	0.50%	0	545	0.50%	0
Communist Workers' Party – For Peace and Socialism	KTP	254	0.23%	0	254	0.23%	0
Natural Law Party	LLP	94	0.09%	0	94	0.09%	0
Valid votes		109,802	100.00%	8	109,802	100.00%	8
Rejected votes		1,059	0.96%				
Total polled		110,861	65.60%				
Registered electors		169,007					

The following candidates were elected: ▌Asko Apukka (Vas), 4,629 votes; ▌Maria Kaisa Aula (Kesk), 9,280 votes; ▌Ossi Korteniemi (Kesk), 4,979 votes; ▌Osmo Kurola (Kok), 3,363 votes; ▌Hannes Manninen (Kesk), 5,102 votes; ▌Maija Rask (SDP), 6,752 votes; ▌Hannu Takkula (Kesk), 9,356 votes; ▌Esko-Juhani Tennilä (Vas), 11,004 votes.

===== 1991 =====
Results of the 1991 parliamentary election held on 17 March 1991:

Party		Party			Electoral Alliance		
Party		Votes	%	Seats	Votes	%	Seats
Centre Party	Kesk	56,850	49.79%	5	57,311	50.19%	5
Liberal People's Party	LKP	461	0.40%	0	57,311	50.19%	5
Left Alliance	Vas	22,562	19.76%	2	22,562	19.76%	2
Social Democratic Party of Finland	SDP	15,933	13.95%	1	15,933	13.95%	1
National Coalition Party	Kok	10,092	8.84%	0	10,092	8.84%	0
Green League	Vihr	3,977	3.48%	0	3,977	3.48%	0
Finnish Rural Party	SMP	2,208	1.93%	0	2,208	1.93%	0
Finnish Christian League	SKL	1,177	1.03%	0	1,177	1.03%	0
Communist Workers' Party – For Peace and Socialism	KTP	310	0.27%	0	310	0.27%	0
Women's Party	NAISL	223	0.20%	0	223	0.20%	0
Pensioners' Party	SEP	206	0.18%	0	206	0.18%	0
Joint list		114	0.10%	0	114	0.10%	0
Humanity Party	IPU	65	0.06%	0	65	0.06%	0
Valid votes		114,178	100.00%	8	114,178	100.00%	8
Blank votes		552	0.48%				
Rejected Votess – Other		1,046	0.90%				
Total polled		115,776	68.30%				
Registered electors		169,507					

The following candidates were elected: ▌Asko Apukka (Vas), 5,744 votes; ▌Maria Kaisa Aula (Kesk), 5,300 votes; ▌Timo Ensio Korva (Kesk), 6,608 votes; ▌Lasse Näsi (Kesk), 5,488 votes; ▌Seppo Pelttari (Kesk), 7,044 votes; ▌Hannele Pokka (Kesk), 9,178 votes; ▌Maija Rask (SDP), 6,419 votes; ▌Esko-Juhani Tennilä (Vas), 7,505 votes.

==== 1980s ====
===== 1987 =====
Results of the 1987 parliamentary election held on 15 and 16 March 1987:

Party		Party			Electoral Alliance		
Party		Votes	%	Seats	Votes	%	Seats
Centre Party	Kesk	45,249	37.88%	4	47,331	39.62%	4
Finnish Christian League	SKL	1,375	1.15%	0	47,331	39.62%	4
Liberal People's Party	LKP	707	0.59%	0	47,331	39.62%	4
Finnish People's Democratic League	SKDL	19,392	16.23%	1	19,392	16.23%	1
Social Democratic Party of Finland	SDP	16,171	13.54%	1	16,171	13.54%	1
Democratic Alternative	DEVA	14,305	11.98%	1	14,305	11.98%	1
National Coalition Party	Kok	14,214	11.90%	1	14,214	11.90%	1
Finnish Rural Party	SMP	4,685	3.92%	0	4,685	3.92%	0
Green League	Vihr	2,590	2.17%	0	2,590	2.17%	0
Pensioners' Party	SEP	763	0.64%	0	763	0.64%	0
Valid votes		119,451	100.00%	8	119,451	100.00%	8
Rejected votes		930	0.77%				
Total polled		120,381	70.49%				
Registered electors		170,774					

The following candidates were elected: ▌Aimo Ajo (SDP), 5,570 votes; ▌Asko Apukka (SKDL), 4,930 votes; ▌Keijo Jääskeläinen (Kok), 3,705 votes; ▌Seppo Pelttari (Kesk), 6,404 votes; ▌Hannele Pokka (Kesk), 9,987 votes; ▌Kimmo Sarapää (Kesk), 4,679 votes; ▌Esko-Juhani Tennilä (DEVA), 12,203 votes; ▌Paavo Väyrynen (Kesk), 12,546 votes.

===== 1983 =====
Results of the 1983 parliamentary election held on 20 and 21 March 1983:

Party		Party			Electoral Alliance		
Party		Votes	%	Seats	Votes	%	Seats
Centre Party and Liberal People's Party	Kesk-LKP	47,455	38.10%	4	48,545	38.97%	4
Finnish Christian League	SKL	1,090	0.88%	0	48,545	38.97%	4
Social Democratic Party of Finland	SDP	21,073	16.92%	1	21,073	16.92%	1
Finnish People's Democratic League	SKDL	19,477	15.64%	1	19,477	15.64%	1
Joint List A		15,340	12.31%	1	15,340	12.31%	1
National Coalition Party	Kok	14,946	12.00%	1	14,946	12.00%	1
Finnish Rural Party	SMP	5,003	4.02%	0	5,003	4.02%	0
Union for Democracy	KVL	183	0.15%	0	183	0.15%	0
Valid votes		124,567	100.00%	8	124,567	100.00%	8
Rejected votes		800	0.64%				
Total polled		125,267	74.19%				
Registered electors		168,985					

The following candidates were elected: ▌Aimo Ajo (SDP), 6,439 votes; ▌Lauri Impiö (Kok), 5,435 votes; ▌Mikko Jokela (Kesk), 6,428 votes; ▌Niilo Koskenniemi (SKDL), 5,876 votes; ▌Seppo Pelttari (Kesk), 6,172 votes; ▌Hannele Pokka (Kesk), 11,085 votes; ▌Esko-Juhani Tennilä (Independent), 14,995 votes; ▌Paavo Väyrynen (Kesk), 9,788 votes.

==== 1970s ====
===== 1979 =====
Results of the 1979 parliamentary election held on 18 and 19 March 1979:

Party		Party			Electoral Alliance		
Party		Votes	%	Seats	Votes	%	Seats
Centre Party	Kesk	42,311	34.81%	3	47,771	39.31%	3
Liberal People's Party	LKP	5,460	4.49%	0	47,771	39.31%	3
Finnish People's Democratic League	SKDL	38,214	31.44%	3	38,214	31.44%	3
Social Democratic Party of Finland	SDP	15,559	12.80%	1	15,559	12.80%	1
National Coalition Party	Kok	14,092	11.60%	1	14,092	11.60%	1
Finnish Rural Party	SMP	2,730	2.25%	0	5,016	4.13%	0
Finnish Christian League	SKL	2,142	1.76%	0	5,016	4.13%	0
Constitutional People's Party	PKP	144	0.12%	0	5,016	4.13%	0
Finnish People's Unity Party	SKYP	875	0.72%	0	875	0.72%	0
Valid votes		121,527	100.00%	8	121,527	100.00%	8
Rejected votes		503	0.41%				
Total polled		122,030	74.59%				
Registered electors		163,599					

The following candidates were elected: ▌Esko–Juhani Tennilä (SKDL), 10,236 votes; ▌Paavo Väyrynen (Kesk), 9,497 votes; ▌Niilo Topias Koskenniemi (SKDL), 7,805 votes; ▌Mikko Erkki Ekorre (SKDL), 7,751 votes; ▌Aimo Ajo (SDP), 7,649 votes; ▌Mikko Jokela (Kesk), 6,106 votes; ▌Hannele Pokka (Kesk), 5,624 votes; ▌Liisa Jaakonsaari (SDP), 5,490 votes; ▌Lauri Impiö (Kok), 5,246 votes.

===== 1975 =====
Results of the 1975 parliamentary election held on 21 and 22 September 1975:

Party		Party			Electoral Alliance		
Party		Votes	%	Seats	Votes	%	Seats
Centre Party	Kesk	37,148	32.15%	4	46,558	40.29%	4
Liberal People's Party	LKP	4,815	4.17%	0	46,558	40.29%	4
Finnish People's Unity Party	SKYP	3,358	2.90%	0	46,558	40.29%	4
Finnish Christian League	SKL	1,237	1.07%	0	46,558	40.29%	4
Finnish People's Democratic League	SKDL	36,784	31.83%	3	36,784	31.83%	3
Social Democratic Party of Finland	SDP	16,984	14.70%	1	16,984	14.70%	1
National Coalition Party	Kok	11,924	10.32%	1	11,924	10.32%	1
Finnish Rural Party	SMP	2,941	2.55%	0	3,298	2.85%	0
Finnish Constitutional People's Party	SPK	234	0.20%	0	3,298	2.85%	0
Party of Finnish Entrepreneurs	SYP	123	0.11%	0	3,298	2.85%	0
Valid votes		115,548	100.00%	9	115,548	100.00%	9
Rejected votes		420	0.30%				
Total polled		115,968	73.90%				
Registered electors		156,921					

The following candidates were elected: ▌Esko-Juhani Tennilä (SKDL), 5,447 votes; ▌Paavo Väyrynen (Kesk), 9,497 votes; ▌Niilo Topias Koskenniemi (SKDL), 6,150 votes; ▌Mikko Erkki Ekorre (SKDL), 6,066 votes; ▌Aimo Ajo (SDP), 8,220 votes; ▌Mikko Jokela (Kesk), 6,106 votes; ▌Hannele Pokka (Kesk), 5,624 votes; ▌Liisa Jaakonsaari (SDP), 5,490 votes; ▌Lauri Impiö (Kok), 5,246 votes.

===== 1972 =====
Results of the 1972 parliamentary election held on 2 and 3 January 1972:

Party		Party			Electoral Alliance		
Party		Votes	%	Seats	Votes	%	Seats
Finnish People's Democratic League	SKDL	30,958	29.46%	3	31,221	29.71%	3
Social Democratic Union of Workers and Smallholders	TPSL	263	0.25%	0	31,221	29.71%	3
Centre Party	Kesk	30,541	29.06%	3	30,541	29.06%	3
Social Democratic Party of Finland	SDP	13,725	13.06%	1	13,725	13.06%	1
Finnish Rural Party	SMP	11,239	10.69%	1	12,151	11.56%	1
Finnish Christian League	SKL	912	0.87%	0	12,151	11.56%	1
National Coalition Party	Kok	10,935	10.41%	1	22,575	10.41%	1
Liberal People's Party	LKP	6,427	6.12%	0	6,427	6.12%	0
Valid votes		105,090	100.00%	9	105,090	100.00%	9
Rejected votes		405	0.38%				
Total polled		105,495	82.76%				
Registered electors		127,465					

The following candidates were elected: ▌Anna-Liisa Tiekso (SDKL), 8,831 votes; ▌Paavo Väyrynen (Kesk), 8,132 votes; ▌Jouni Mykkänen (Kok), 7,792 votes; ▌Aimo Ajo (SDP), 6,308 votes; ▌Arttur Antero Niemelä (SMP), 5,856 votes; ▌Mikko Jokela (Kesk), 4,445 votes; ▌Pekka Vilmi (Kesk), 5,342 votes; ▌Niilo Topias Koskenniemi (SDKL), 4,730 votes; ▌Veli Pekka Salla (SDKL), 3,903 votes.

===== 1970 =====
Results of the 1970 parliamentary election held on 15 and 16 March 1970:

Party		Votes	%	Seats
Centre Party	Kesk	29,609	28.66%	3
Finnish People's Democratic League	SKDL	29,041	28.11%	3
Finnish Rural Party	SMP	12,849	12.44%	1
Social Democratic Party of Finland	SDP	12,590	12.19%	1
National Coalition Party	Kok	9,723	9.41%	1
Liberal People's Party	LKP	8,891	8.61%	0
Social Democratic Union of Workers and Smallholders	TPSL	357	0.24%	0
Others		258	0.25%	0
Valid votes		103,318	100.00%	9
Rejected votes		417	0.40%	
Total polled		103,375	82.10%	
Registered electors		125,913		

The following candidates were elected: ▌Anna-Liisa Tiekso (SDKL), 8,911 votes; ▌Jouni Mykkänen (Kok), 7,792 votes; ▌Paavo Väyrynen (Kesk), 6,016 votes; ▌Pekka Vilmi (Kesk), 5,832 votes; ▌Urho Knuuti (SDP), 5,282 votes; ▌Veikko Hanhirova (Kesk), 5,170 votes; ▌Niilo Topias Koskenniemi (SDKL), 4,137 votes; ▌Veli Pekka Salla (SDKL), 4,060 votes; ▌Arttur Antero Niemelä (SMP), 2,826 votes.

==== 1960s ====
===== 1966 =====
Results of the 1966 parliamentary election held on 20 and 21 March 1966:

Party		Party			Electoral Alliance		
Party		Votes	%	Seats	Votes	%	Seats
Centre Party	Kesk	33,515	33.62%	4	41,333	41.46%	5
Liberal People's Party	LKP	7,818	7.84%	1	41,333	41.46%	5
Finnish People's Democratic League	SKDL	34,987	35.10%	4	36,068	36.18%	4
Social Democratic Union of Workers and Smallholders	TPSL	1,081	1.08%	0	36,068	36.18%	4
Social Democratic Party of Finland	SDP	14,306	14.35%	1	14,306	14.35%	1
National Coalition Party	Kok	7,971	8.00%	0	7,971	8.00%	0
Write-in lists		5	0.00%	0	5	0.00%	0
Valid Votes		99,683	100.00%	10	99,683	100.00%	10
Blank Votes		60	0.06%				
Rejected Votess – Other		324	0.32%				
Total Polled		100,085	86.91%				
Registered Electors		115,153					

The following candidates were elected: ▌Pekka Vilmi (Kesk), 6,890 votes; ▌Tuure Salo (LKP), 6,644 votes;▌Anna-Liisa Tiekso (SDKL), 6,370 votes; ▌Veikko Hanhirova (Kesk), 5,652 votes; ▌Olavi Lahtela (Kesk), 5,589 votes; ▌Eino Tainio (SDKL), 5,138 votes; ▌Urho Knuuti (SDP), 5,072 votes; ▌Toivo Friman (SDKL), 5,004 votes; ▌Eino Sääskilahti (Kesk), 4,991 votes; ▌Veli Salla (SDKL), 4,553 votes.

===== 1962 =====
Results of the 1962 parliamentary election held on 4 and 5 February 1962:

Party		Party			Electoral Alliance		
Party		Votes	%	Seats	Votes	%	Seats
Agrarian Party	ML	35,325	36.91%	4	43,211	45.15%	5
People's Party of Finland	SK	7,886	8.24%	1	43,211	45.15%	5
Finnish People's Democratic League	SKDL	32,425	33.88%	3	60,239	33.88%	3
National Coalition Party	Kok	8,643	9.03%	1	8,868	9.27%	1
Liberal League	VL	225	0.24%	0	8,868	9.27%	1
Social Democratic Party of Finland	SDP	7,854	8.21%	0	7,854	8.21%	0
Social Democratic Union of Workers and Smallholders	TPSL	1,826	1.91%	0	1,826	1.91%	0
Smallholders' Party of Finland	SPP	1,509	1.58%	0	1,509	1.58%	0
Write-in lists		3	0.00%	0	3	0.00%	0
Valid votes		95,696	100.00%	9	95,696	100.00%	9
Rejected votes		407	0.42%				
Total polled		96,103	87.31%				
Registered electors		110,071					

The following candidates were elected: ▌Tuure Salo (SK), 7,886 votes; ▌Anna-Liisa Tiekso (SDKL), 6,836 votes; ▌Olavi Lahtela (ML), 6,712 votes; ▌Markus Niskala (ML), 6,394 votes; ▌Eino Tainio (SDKL), 6,121 votes; ▌Vilho Suosalo (SDKL), 5,682 votes; ▌Akseli Paarman (ML), 5,442 votes; ▌Eino Sääskilahti (ML), 5,418 votes; ▌Erkki Koivisto (Kok), 5,072 votes.

==== 1950s ====
===== 1958 =====
Results of the 1958 parliamentary election held on 6 and 7 July 1958:

Party		Party			Electoral Alliance		
Party		Votes	%	Seats	Votes	%	Seats
Finnish People's Democratic League	SKDL	29,498	36.93%	4	29,498	36.93%	4
Agrarian Party	ML	28,115	35.19%	3	28,115	35.19%	3
National Coalition Party	Kok	7,076	8.86%	1	12,444	15.58%	1
People's Party of Finland	SK	3,056	3.83%	0	12,444	15.58%	1
Agrarian Party Opposition	MLO	2,312	2.89%	0	12,444	15.58%	1
Social Democratic Party of Finland	SDP	9,807	12.28%	1	9,807	12.28%	1
Write-in lists		3	0.00%	0	3	0.00%	0
Valid votes		79,866	100.00%	9	79,866	100.00%	9
Rejected votes		474	0.59%				
Total polled		80,340	79.19%				
Registered electors		101,456					

The following candidates were elected: ▌Anna-Liisa Tiekso (SDKL), 6,823 votes; ▌Eino Tainio (SDKL), 6,019 votes; ▌Juho Lakkala (SDKL), 5,682 votes; ▌Martti Miettunen (ML), 5,170 votes; ▌Erkki Koivisto (Kok), 5,072 votes; ▌Vilho Väyrynen (SDP), 3,986 votes; ▌Olavi Lahtela (ML), 4,522 votes; ▌Markus Niskala (ML), 4,522 votes; ▌Toivo Friman (SDKL), 3,868 votes.

===== 1954 =====
Results of the 1954 parliamentary election held on 7 and 8 March 1954:

Party		Party			Electoral Alliance		
Party		Votes	%	Seats	Votes	%	Seats
Agrarian Party	ML	31,025	40.08%	4	31,025	40.08%	4
Finnish People's Democratic League	SKDL	25,734	33.24%	3	25,734	33.24%	3
National Coalition Party	Kok	7,892	10.19%	1	10,658	13.77%	1
People's Party of Finland	SK	2,766	3.57%	0	10,658	13.77%	1
Social Democratic Party of Finland	SDP	9,987	12.90%	1	9,987	12.90%	1
Write-in lists		10	0.01%	0	10	0.01%	0
Valid votes		77,414	100.00%	9	77,414	100.00%	9
Rejected votes		401	0.70%				
Total polled		77,815	81.81%				
Registered electors		94,142					

The following candidates were elected: ▌Toivo Friman (SKDL); ▌Erkki Koivisto (Kok); ▌Matti Lahtela (ML); ▌Martti Miettunen (ML); ▌Eino Tainio (SKDL); ▌Anna-Liisa Tiekso (SDKL); ▌Vilho Väyrynen (SDP).

===== 1951 =====
Results of the 1951 parliamentary election held on 1 and 2 July 1951:

Party		Party			Electoral Alliance		
Party		Votes	%	Seats	Votes	%	Seats
Agrarian Party	ML	26,238	37.87%	3	28,512	41.16%	3
People's Party of Finland	SK	2,274	3.28%	0	28,512	41.16%	3
Finnish People's Democratic League	SKDL	23,358	33.72%	3	23,358	33.72%	3
Social Democratic Party of Finland	SDP	9,421	13.60%	1	9,421	13.60%	1
National Coalition Party	Kok	7,974	11.51%	1	7,974	11.51%	1
Write-in lists		13	0.01%	0	13	0.01%	0
Valid votes		69,278	100.00%	8	69,278	100.00%	8
Rejected votes		529	0.76%				
Total polled		69,807	77.28%				
Registered electors		90,333					

The following candidates were elected: ▌Toivo Friman (SKDL); ▌Erkki Koivisto (Kok); ▌Matti Lahtela (ML); ▌Martti Miettunen (ML); ▌Markus Niskala (ML); ▌Juho Pöykkö (ML); ▌Eino Tainio (SKDL); ▌Anna-Liisa Tiekso (SDKL); ▌Vilho Väyrynen (SDP).

==== 1940s ====
===== 1948 =====
Results of the 1948 parliamentary election held on 1 and 2 July 1948:

Party		Party			Electoral Alliance		
Party		Votes	%	Seats	Votes	%	Seats
Agrarian Party	ML	25,870	41.07%	4	25,870	41.07%	4
Finnish People's Democratic League	SKDL	18,683	29.66%	2	18,683	29.66%	2
National Coalition Party	Kok	8,465	13.44%	1	9,183	14.58%	1
National Progressive Party	KE	718	1.14%	0	9,183	14.58%	1
Social Democratic Party of Finland	SDP	8,900	14.13%	1	8,900	14.13%	1
Small Farmers Party		196	0.31%	0	196	0.31%	0
Write-in lists		161	0.26%	0	161	0.26%	0
Valid votes		62,993	100.00%	8	62,993	100.00%	8
Rejected votes		384	0.61%				
Total polled		63,377	76.63%				
Registered electors		82,707					

The following candidates were elected: ▌Toivo Friman (SKDL); ▌Erkki Koivisto (Kok); ▌Janne Koivuranta (ML); ▌Matti Lahtela (ML); ▌Martti Miettunen (ML); ▌Markus Niskala (ML); ▌Eino Tainio (SKDL); ▌Vilho Väyrynen (SDP).

===== 1945 =====
Results of the 1945 parliamentary election held on 17 and 18 March 1945:

Party		Party			Electoral Alliance		
Party		Votes	%	Seats	Votes	%	Seats
Agrarian Party	ML	20,631	42.26%	4	21,890	44.84%	4
National Progressive Party	KE	1,259	2.58%	0	21,890	44.84%	4
Finnish People's Democratic League	SKDL	13,502	27.66%	2	13,981	28.63%	2
Small Farmers Party		479	0.98%	0	13,981	28.63%	2
Social Democratic Party of Finland	SDP	6,949	14.23%	1	6,949	14.23%	1
National Coalition Party	Kok	6,001	12.29%	1	6,001	12.29%	1
Valid votes		48,821	100.00%	8	48,821	100.00%	8
Rejected votes		612	1.24%				
Total polled		49,433	63.36%				
Registered electors		78,020					

The following candidates were elected: ▌Lauri Kaijalainen (ML); ▌Erkki Koivisto (Kok); ▌Matti Lahtela (ML); ▌Martti Miettunen (ML); ▌Markus Niskala (ML); ▌Heikki Pesonen (SDP); ▌Eino Tainio (SKDL); ▌Reino Uusisalmi (SKDL).

==== 1930s ====
===== 1939 =====
Results of the 1939 parliamentary election held on 1 and 2 July 1939:

Party		Party			Electoral Alliance		
Party		Votes	%	Seats	Votes	%	Seats
Agrarian Party	ML	19,184	52.19%	5	20,132	54.77%	5
National Progressive Party	KE	948	2.58%	0	20,132	54.77%	5
Social Democratic Party of Finland	SDP	10,692	29.09%	2	10,692	29.09%	2
National Coalition Party	Kok	2,977	8.10%	0	2,977	8.10%	0
Patriotic People's Movement	IKL	1,960	5.33%	0	1,960	5.33%	0
Party of Smallholders and Rural People	PMP	976	2.66%	0	976	2.66%	0
Write-in lists		18	0.49%	0	18	0.61%	0
Valid votes		36,755	100.00%	7	36,755	100.00%	7
Rejected votes		224	0.32%				
Total polled		36,979	62.28%				
Registered electors		59,379					

The following candidates were elected: ▌Uuno Hannula (ML); ▌Antti Junes (ML); ▌Lauri Kaijalainen (ML); ▌O. H. Kekäläinen (SDP); ▌Janne Koivuranta (ML); ▌Matti Lahtela (ML); ▌Martti Peltonen (SDP).

== See also ==
- Constituencies of Finland
