= List of members of the Parliament of Finland, 2007–2011 =

This is a list of the members of the 35th Finnish Parliament, following the 2007 election.

== Election results ==
Summary of the 18 March 2007 Parliament of Finland election results
Parties	Votes	%	Seats
Centre Party (Suomen Keskusta, Centern i Finland)	640,428	23.1	51
National Coalition Party (Kansallinen Kokoomus, Samlingspartiet)	616,841	22.3	50
Social Democratic Party of Finland (Suomen Sosialidemokraattinen Puolue, Finlands socialdemokratiska parti)	594,194	21.4	45
Left Alliance (Vasemmistoliitto, Vänsterförbundet)	244,296	8.8	17
Green League (Vihreä liitto, Gröna förbundet)	234,429	8.5	15
Christian Democrats (Kristillisdemokraatit, Kristdemokraterna)	134,790	4.9	7
Swedish People's Party (Svenska Folkpartiet, Ruotsalainen kansanpuolue)	126,520	4.5	9
True Finns (Perussuomalaiset, Sannfinländarna)	112,256	4.1	5
Communist Party of Finland (Suomen Kommunistinen Puolue, Finlands kommunistiska parti)	18,277	0.7	0
Seniors' Party of Finland (Suomen Senioripuolue, Finlands Seniorparti)	16,715	0.6	0
Bourgeois Alliance (Borgerlig Allians, Åland)	9,561	0.3	1
Total (turnout 67.9%)			200
Source: Finnish Ministry of Justice

== Lists ==
=== By party ===
==== Social Democratic Party (45) ====
Name	Constituency
Pauliina Viitamies	Southern Savonia
Eero Heinäluoma	Helsinki
Rakel Hiltunen	Helsinki
Päivi Lipponen	Helsinki
Jacob Söderman	Helsinki
Erkki Tuomioja	Helsinki
Tarja Filatov	Tavastia
Johannes Koskinen	Tavastia
Jouko Skinnari	Tavastia
Satu Taiveaho	Tavastia
Susanna Huovinen	Central Finland
Reijo Laitinen	Central Finland
Tuula Peltonen	Central Finland
Sinikka Hurskainen	Kymi
Anneli Kiljunen	Kymi
Valto Koski	Kymi
Sirpa Paatero	Kymi
Johanna Ojala-Niemelä	Lapland

==== Left Alliance (17) ====
Name	Constituency
Claes Andersson (resigned)	Uusimaa
Paavo Arhinmäki	Helsinki
Matti Kangas	Central Finland
Matti Kauppila	Tavastia
Martti Korhonen	Oulu
Mikko Kuoppa	Pirkanmaa
Merja Kyllönen	Oulu
Jaakko Laakso	Uusimaa
Annika Lapintie	Finland Proper
Markus Mustajärvi	Lapland
Veijo Puhjo	Satakunta
Minna Sirnö	Pirkaanmaa
Esko-Juhani Tennilä	Lapland
Pentti Tiusanen	Kymi
Unto Valpas	Oulu
Erkki Virtanen	Northern Savonia
Jyrki Yrttiaho	Finland Proper

==== Green League (15) ====
Name	Constituency
Outi Alanko-Kahiluoto	Helsinki
Janina Andersson	Finland Proper
Tuija Brax	Helsinki
Merikukka Forsius	Uusimaa
Pekka Haavisto	Helsinki
Heidi Hautala	Uusimaa
Heli Järvinen	Southern Savonia
Johanna Karimäki	Uusimaa
Jyrki Kasvi	Uusimaa
Ville Niinistö	Finland Proper
Kirsi Ojansuu	Tavastia
Erkki Pulliainen	Oulu
Anni Sinnemäki	Helsinki
Johanna Sumuvuori	Helsinki
Oras Tynkkynen	Pirkanmaa

==== Swedish People's Party (9) ====
Name	Constituency
Thomas Blomqvist	Uusimaa
Christina Gestrin	Uusimaa
Anna-Maja Henriksson	Vaasa
Elisabeth Nauclér	Åland
Håkan Nordman	Vaasa
Mikaela Nylander	Uusimaa
Mats Nylund	Vaasa
Astrid Thors	Helsinki
Stefan Wallin	Finland Proper
Ulla-Maj Wideroos	Vaasa

==== Christian Democrats (7) ====
Name	Constituency
Bjarne Kallis	Vaasa
Toimi Kankaanniemi	Central Finland
Kari Kärkkäinen	Northern Savonia
Sari Palm	Kymi
Leena Rauhala	Pirkanmaa
Päivi Räsänen	Tavastia
Tarja Tallqvist	Uusimaa

==== Centre Party (51) ====
Name	Constituency
Esko Ahonen	Vaasa
Mikko Alatalo	Pirkanmaa
Sirkka-Liisa Anttila	Tavastia
Risto Autio	Tavastia
Susanna Haapoja	Vaasa
Lasse Hautala	Vaasa
Hannakaisa Heikkinen	Northern Savonia
Hannu Hoskonen	Northern Savonia
Liisa Hyssälä	Finland Proper
Tuomo Hänninen	Oulu
Antti Kaikkonen	Uusimaa
Timo Kalli	Satakunta
Anne Kalmari	Central Finland
Oiva Kaltiokumpu	Satakunta
Kyösti Karjula	Oulu
Tanja Karpela	Uusimaa
Elsi Katainen	Northern Savonia
Timo Kaunisto	Finland Proper
Inkeri Kerola	Oulu
Mari Kiviniemi	Helsinki
Esko Kiviranta	Finland Proper
Katri Komi	Southern Savonia
Timo Korhonen	Oulu
Juha Korkeaoja	Satakunta
Seppo Kääriäinen	Northern Savonia
Markku Laukkanen	Kymi
Paula Lehtomäki	Oulu
Jari Leppä	Southern Savonia
Mika Lintilä	Vaasa
Hannes Manninen	Lapland
Juha Mieto	Vaasa
Lauri Oinonen	Central Finland
Markku Pakkanen	Kymi
Aila Paloniemi	Central Finland
Mauri Pekkarinen	Central Finland
Tuomo Puumala	Vaasa
Antti Rantakangas	Oulu
Juha Rehula	Tavastia
Eero Reijonen	Northern Savonia
Markku Rossi	Northern Savonia
Pertti Salovaara	Pirkanmaa
Janne Seurujärvi	Lapland
Paula Sihto	Vaasa
Seppo Särkiniemi	Uusimaa
Kimmo Tiilikainen	Kymi
Tapani Tölli	Oulu
Markku Uusipaavalniemi	Uusimaa
Matti Vanhanen	Uusimaa
Mirja Vehkaperä	Oulu
Anu Vehviläinen	Northern Savonia
Pekka Vilkuna	Oulu
Paavo Väyrynen	Lapland
Klaus Pentti	Pirkanmaa

==== True Finns (5) ====
Name	Constituency
Pentti Oinonen	Northern Savonia
Pirkko Ruohonen-Lerner	Uusimaa
Timo Soini	Uusimaa
Pertti Virtanen	Pirkanmaa
Raimo Vistbacka	Vaasa

==== National Coalition Party (50) ====
Name	Constituency
Eero Akaan-Penttilä	Uusimaa
Sirpa Asko-Seljavaara	Helsinki
Merikukka Forsius	Uusimaa
Juha Hakola	Helsinki
Leena Harkimo	Helsinki
Timo Heinonen	Tavastia
Pertti Hemmilä	Finland Proper
Hanna-Leena Hemming	Uusimaa
Anne Holmlund	Satakunta
Jyri Häkämies	Kymi
Harri Jaskari	Pirkanmaa
Kalle Jokinen	Tavastia
Ilkka Kanerva	Finland Proper
Arja Karhuvaara	Helsinki
Ulla Karvo	Lapland
Jyrki Katainen	Northern Savonia
Sampsa Kataja	Satakunta
Jari Koskinen	Tavastia
Jari Larikka	Kymi
Sanna Lauslahti	Uusimaa
Jouko Laxell	Finland Proper
Eero Lehti	Uusimaa
Suvi Lindén	Oulu
Marjo Matikainen-Kallström	Uusimaa
Jukka Mäkelä	Uusimaa
Outi Mäkelä	Uusimaa
Tapani Mäkinen	Uusimaa
Olli Nepponen	Southern Savonia
Sauli Niinistö	Uusimaa
Tuija Nurmi	Tavastia
Heikki A. Ollila	Pirkanmaa
Petteri Orpo	Finland Proper
Reijo Paajanen	Kymi
Sanna Perkiö	Helsinki
Petri Pihlajaniemi	Vaasa
Lyly Rajala	Oulu
Pekka Ravi	Northern Savonia
Paula Risikko	Vaasa
Pertti Salolainen	Helsinki
Petri Salo	Vaasa
Sari Sarkomaa	Helsinki
Kimmo Sasi	Pirkanmaa
Arto Satonen	Pirkanmaa
Marja Tiura	Pirkanmaa
Lenita Toivakka	Southern Savonia
Tuulikki Ukkola	Oulu
Raija Vahasalo	Northern Savonia
Jan Vapaavuori	Helsinki
Ilkka Viljanen	Tavastia
Henna Virkkunen	Central Finland
Anne-Mari Virolainen	Finland Proper
Ben Zyskowicz	Helsinki

== Changes during the legislation ==
=== Representatives who resigned ===
Name	Party	Constituency	Date of resignation	Replacement	Notes
Tuula Haatainen	Social Democratic Party	Helsinki	11 September 2007	Jacob Söderman	was elected as Deputy Mayor of Helsinki
Claes Andersson	Left Alliance	Uusimaa	9 September 2008	Kari Uotila	Health reasons

=== Representatives who changed parties ===
Name	Constituency	Old party	New party	Date of resignation
Merikukka Forsius	Helsinki	Green League	National Coalition Party	14 February 2008
