= Mykkänen =

Mykkänen is a Finnish surname.

== Geographical distribution ==
As of 2014, 94.1% of all known bearers of the surname Mykkänen were residents of Finland (frequency 1:3,412), 3.6% of Sweden (1:158,819) and 2.0% of Estonia (1:37,762).

In Finland, the frequency of the surname was higher than national average (1:3,412) in the following regions:

1. Northern Savonia (1:590)
2. South Karelia (1:2,381)
3. Central Finland (1:2,705)
4. Kymenlaakso (1:3,225)

== People ==
- Jouni Mykkänen (born 1939), Finnish journalist and politician
- John Mykkanen (born 1966), American Olympic swimmer
- Kirsi Mykkänen (born 1978), Finnish sprinter
- Kai Mykkänen (born 1979), Finnish politician
