= Mustajärvi =

Mustajärvi is a Finnish surname, meaning "black lake". Notable people with the surname include:

- Markus Mustajärvi (born 1963), Finnish politician
- Pate Mustajärvi (1956–2025), Finnish rock singer
