= Mikko Kärnä =

Finnish politician

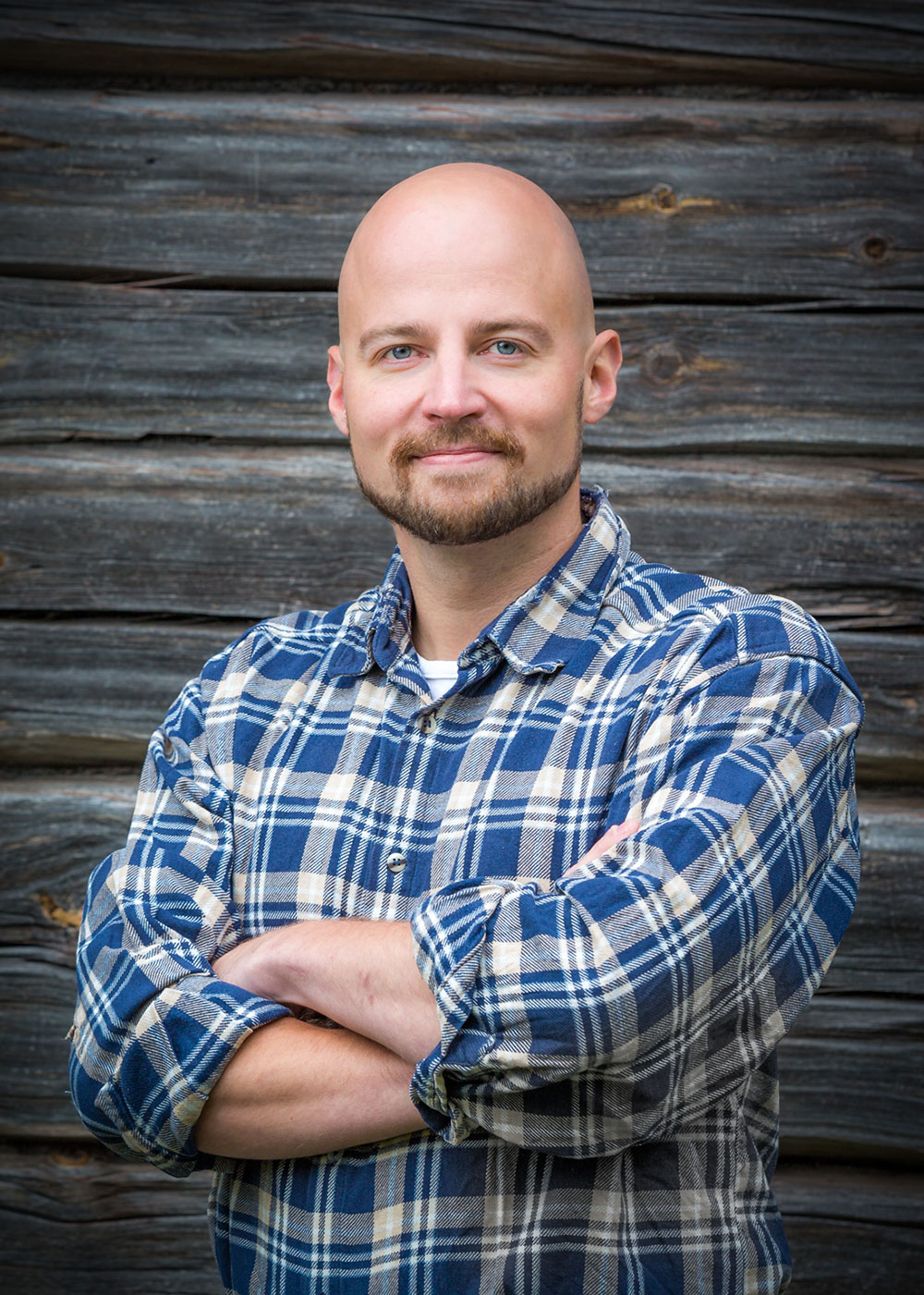
- Born: 8 December 1980; Espoo
- Alma mater: Oulun Lyseo Upper Secondary School; National Defence University; University of Lapland
- Occupation: Politician
- Website: http://www.lapinpuolustaja.fi/
- Position held: member of the Parliament of Finland (2015–2018), member of the Parliament of Finland (2019–)
- Rank: captain (2009–)

Mikko Kärnä (born 8 December 1980 in Espoo) is a Finnish politician. He served as a member of the Parliament of Finland from 30 April 2015 until 12 June 2018 for the Lapland constituency. He was also the mayor of Enontekiö from 2012 to 2015. He is a member of the Centre Party.

In April 2019, he was reelected as a member of the Parliament of Finland.
