= Simo Rundgren =

Finnish politician

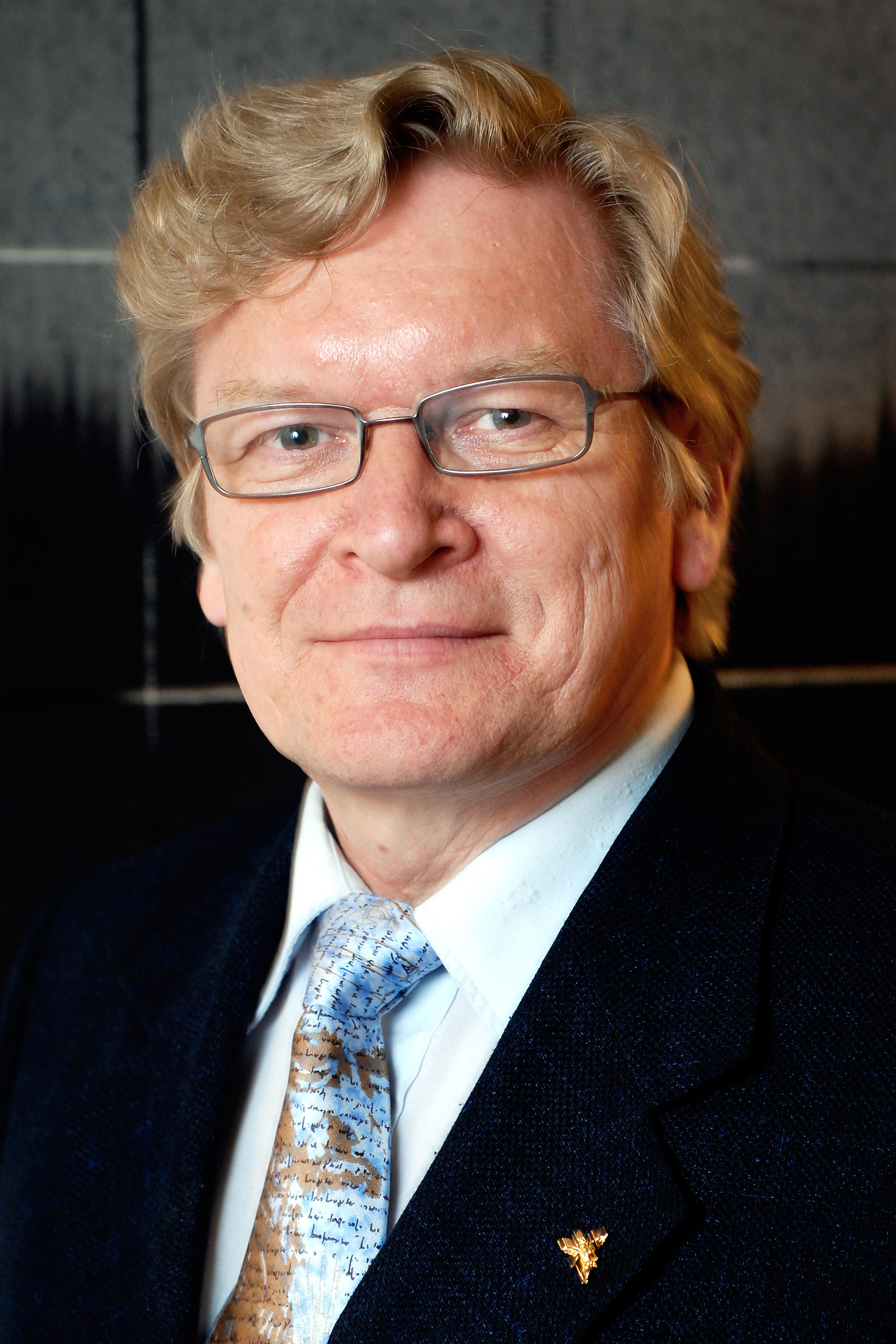

Member of Finnish Parliament
- In office 19 March 2003 – 20 March 2007
- In office 20 April 2011 – 21 April 2015

Personal details
- Born: 28 June 1953 (age 72) Kolari, Finland
- Party: Centre Party

Simo Arttur Rundgren (born 28 June 1953 in Kolari, Finland) is a Finnish politician. He was elected to the Finnish Parliament from Lapland (electoral district) in 2003 and again in 2011. He has a master's degree in Theology and he has worked as a pastor/vicar from 1982 to 1993 and again from 1997 to 2003. Rundgren worked as an Executive Director of Finnish Centre Youth from 1974 to 1976.

In 2005, he was elected chairman of the Nordic Cultural Fund for the 2006–2007 term.

In the midst of bankruptcy at the Kaunisvaara mine in Sweden, Rundgren advocated for the construction of a railway between the mine and Kolari to increase its financial solvency.
