= Anna-Liisa Tiekso =

Finnish politician (1929–2010)

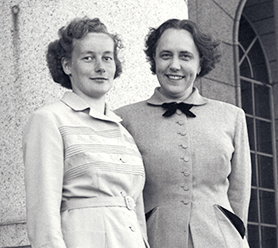
- Tiekso (left) with Hertta Kuusinen in the 1950s

Member of the Parliament of Finland
- In office 21 July 1951 – 31 January 1974
- Constituency: Lapland

Finland Minister of Social Affairs and Health
- In office 15 July 1970 – 26 March 1971
- Prime Minister: Ahti Karjalainen
- Preceded by: Gunnar Korhonen
- Succeeded by: Pekka Kuusi

Finland Minister of Social Affairs
- In office 22 March 1968 – 14 May 1970
- Prime Minister: Mauno Koivisto
- Preceded by: Matti Koivunen
- Succeeded by: Gunnar Korhonen

Personal details
- Born: 14 March 1929 Kemi, Finland
- Died: 20 September 2010 (aged 81) Kemi, Finland
- Party: Finnish People's Democratic League

Anna-Liisa Korpinen (née Tiekso; 14 March 1929 – 20 September 2010) was a Finnish politician. She represented Lapland in the Parliament of Finland as a member of the Finnish People's Democratic League from 1951 to 1974. In 1968, she was appointed as Minister of Social Affairs by prime minister Mauno Koivisto, and was the Minister of Social Affairs and Health in prime minister Ahti Karjalainen's government from 1970 to 1971.

== Early life and education ==
Tiekso was born on 14 March 1929 in Kemi, Finland. She was the daughter of a small farmer and a schoolteacher. She completed the Finnish matriculation exam in 1949 and enrolled at the University of Helsinki to study law. Around this time, Tiekso married Arne Isaksson, with whom she had two children, but they divorced in 1957.

== Political career ==
Tiekso dropped out of university when she was elected to the Parliament of Finland in 1951, representing the constituency of Lapland as a member of the Finnish People's Democratic League. She was 22 years old when she was elected, and was the youngest representative in Parliament. She was re-elected six times, serving until January 1974. During her time in Parliament, Tiekso sat on several committees, including the Education and Culture Committee, which she chaired from 1962 to 1968; the Grand Committee, which she chaired from 1972 to 1973; and the Finance Committee. Her chairmanship of the Education and Culture Committee was the first time since the 1940s that a woman chaired a parliamentary committee in Finland. She oversaw a major reform of Finland's educational system, introducing a national comprehensive school system. Tiekso was also a part of the Finnish delegation to the Nordic council, and a presidential elector in the 1956, 1962, and 1968 elections.

Tiekso was also active in local and party politics. She was elected to the municipal council of Kemin maalaiskunta between 1954 and 1968. She was a member of the Communist Party of Finland's central committee and a deputy chair of the Finnish People's Democratic League.

In 1968, Tiekso was appointed as Minister of Social Affairs by prime minister Mauno Koivisto. She was the only woman to hold a position in Koivisto's first cabinet, and was reappointed as Minister of Social Affairs and Health by prime minister Ahti Karjalainen in 1970. As minister, she introduced legislation to provide pensions to widows and self-employed workers. She resigned, along with the rest of the cabinet, in 1971 after a major internal disagreement over price controls on coffee, cigarettes, and sugar.

== Later life and death ==
Tiekso resigned from Parliament in 1974 to become the assistant director of occupational safety and health at the manufacturing company Rautaruukki. She married Rauno Korpinen, a member of Parliament, in 1975 and moved to Oulu, where she continued working at Rautaruukki. She retired from her career in 1982, and headed Eläkeläiset, the national pensioners' organization in Finland, from 1984 to 1994. She died on 20 September 2010 in Kemi, at the age of 81.

== See also ==
- List of Cabinet Ministers from Finland by ministerial portfolio
