= Markus Lohi =

Finnish politician

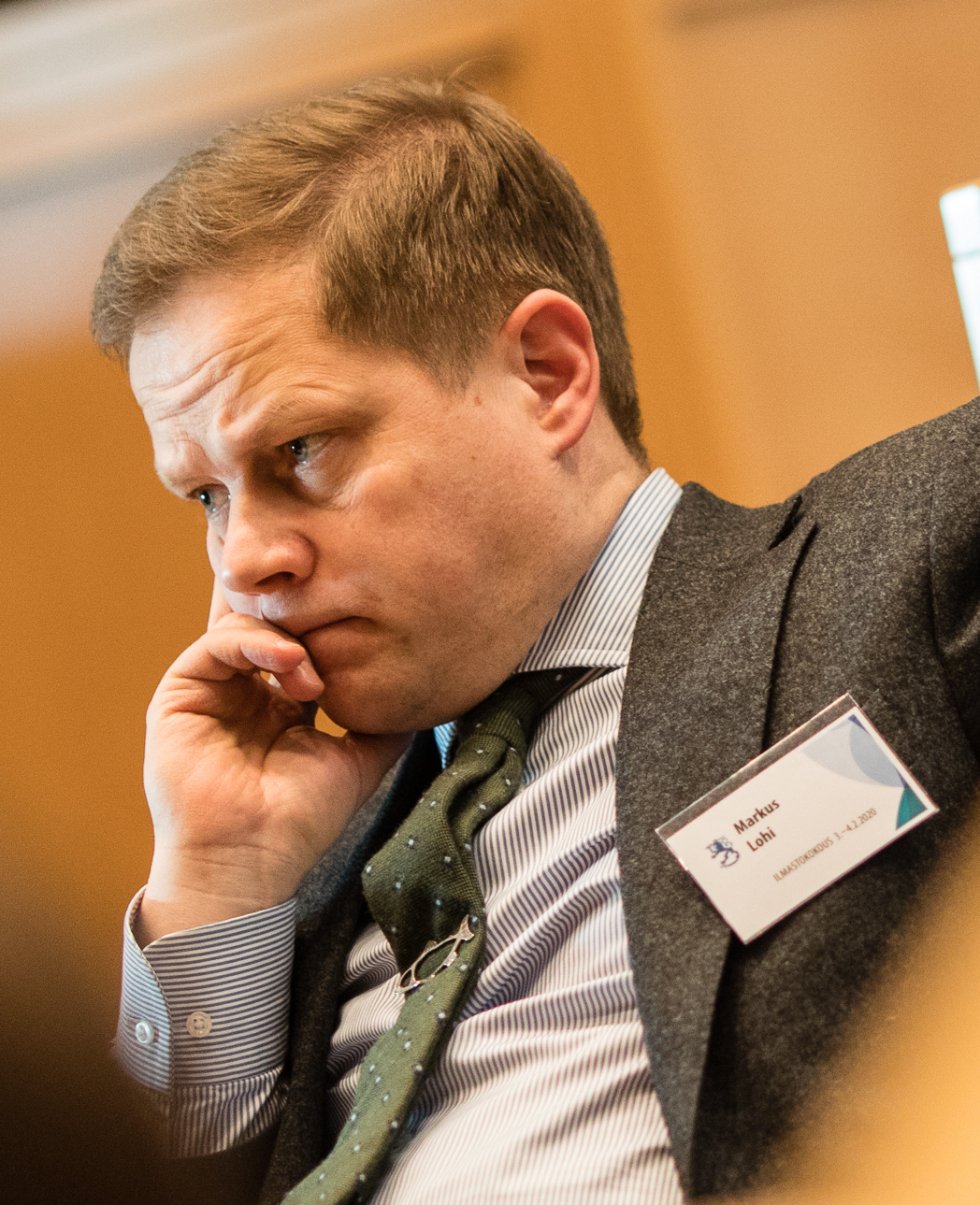

Member of the Finnish Parliament for Lapland
- Incumbent
- Assumed office 20 April 2011

Personal details
- Born: 16 June 1972 (age 54) Haukipudas, Finland
- Party: Centre Party
- Education: University of Lapland

Markus Samuli Lohi (born 16 June 1972) is a Finnish politician currently serving in the Parliament of Finland for the Centre Party at the Lapland constituency.
