= Tuulikki Ukkola =

Finnish journalist and politician (1943–2019)

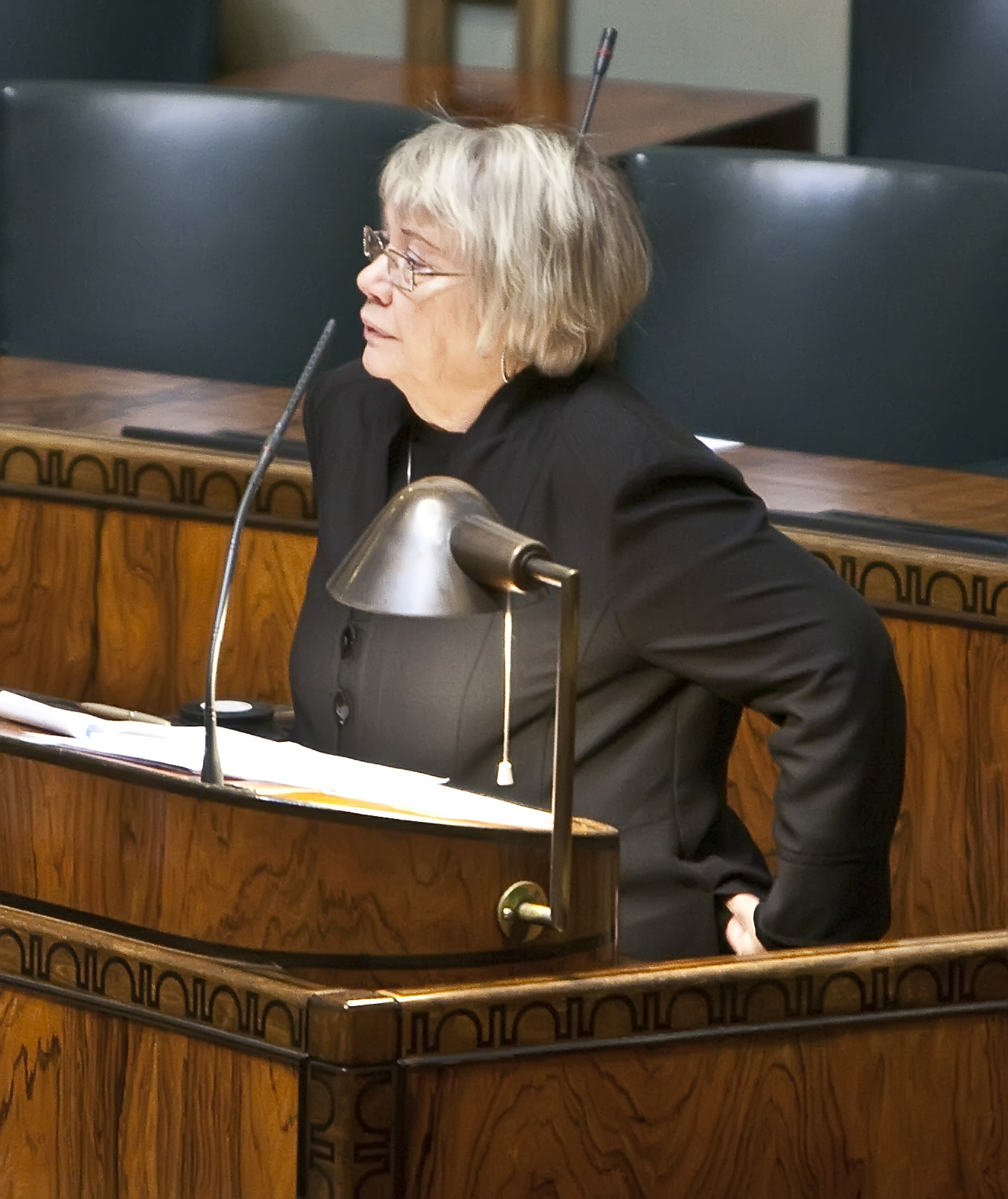
- Ukkola in February 2009

Member of the Finnish Parliament for Oulu
- In office 2007–2011; 1991–1995

Personal details
- Born: Lahja Tuulikki Parviainen; 28 November 1943 Taivalkoski, Finland
- Died: 28 May 2019 (aged 75) Oulu, Finland
- Party: National Coalition Party; Liberal People's Party (before 2007)
- Occupation: Journalist

Lahja Tuulikki Ukkola (née Parviainen; 28 November 1943 – 28 May 2019) was a Finnish politician and journalist. Born in Taivalkoski, she began working for the newspaper Kaleva in 1962. As a member of the Liberal People's Party, she served as an MP for the Oulu constituency from 1991 to 1995. She was also the leader of the party between 1993 and 1995. Following the 2007 national parliamentary election, Ukkola was again elected as an MP for Oulu, this time for the National Coalition Party, serving until 2011.

Ukkola died on 28 May 2019 in Oulu, at the age of 75.
