= Sara Seppänen =

Finnish politician (born 1982)

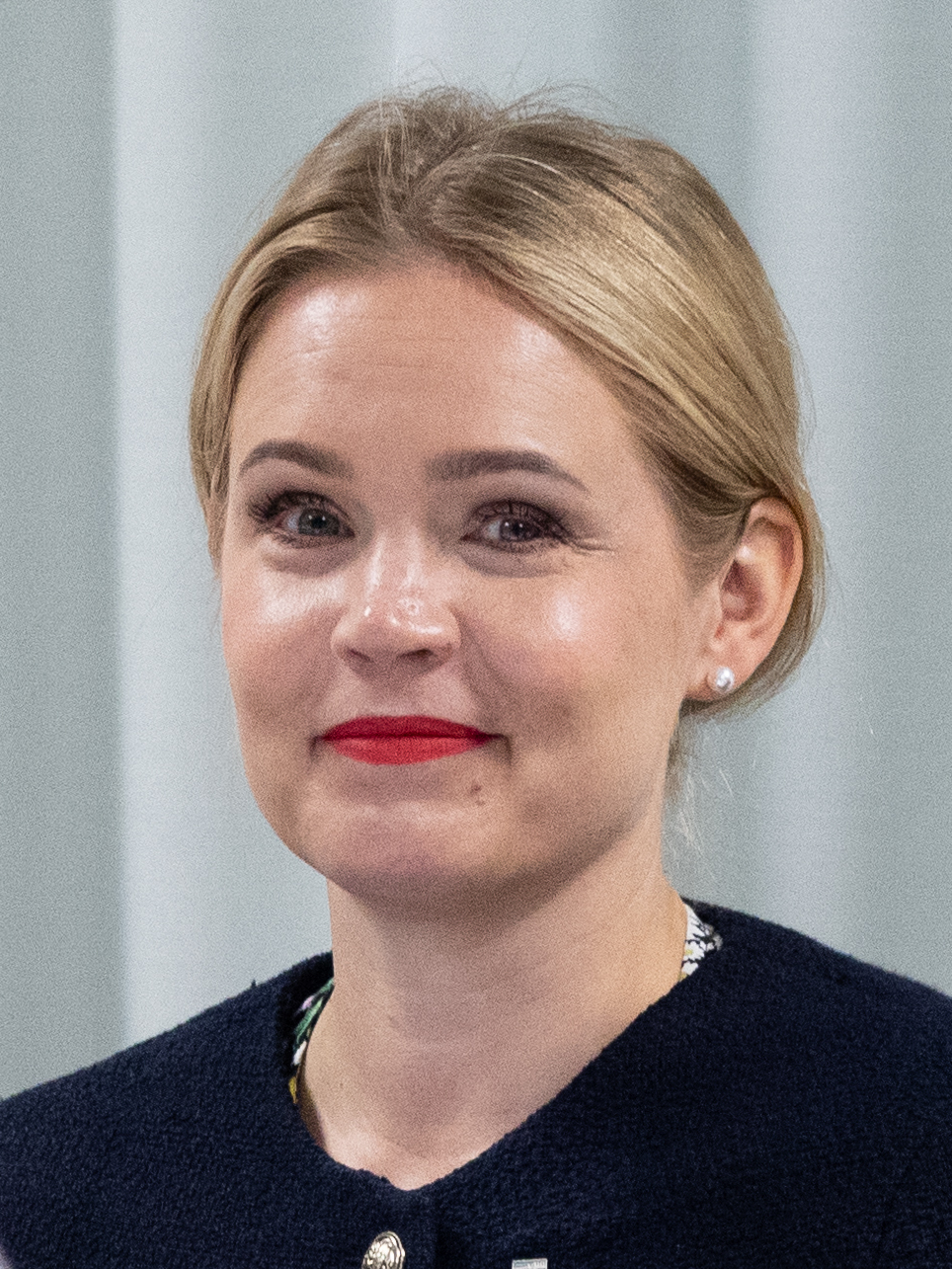
- Seppänen in 2023.

Member of the Finnish Parliament for Lapland
- Incumbent
- Assumed office 5 April 2023

Personal details
- Born: 29 August 1982 (age 43) Rovaniemi, Finland
- Party: Finns Party

Sara Seppänen (born 1982) is a Finnish politician from the Finns Party. She was elected to the Parliament of Finland from Lapland in the 2023 Finnish parliamentary election. She is the chairman of the council of the Federation of Lapland and a member of the Rovaniemi city council and board.

== Personal life ==
Seppänen's civilian profession is as a teacher and doctoral researcher.
