= Vilho Väyrynen =

Finnish lawyer and politician (1912–2000)

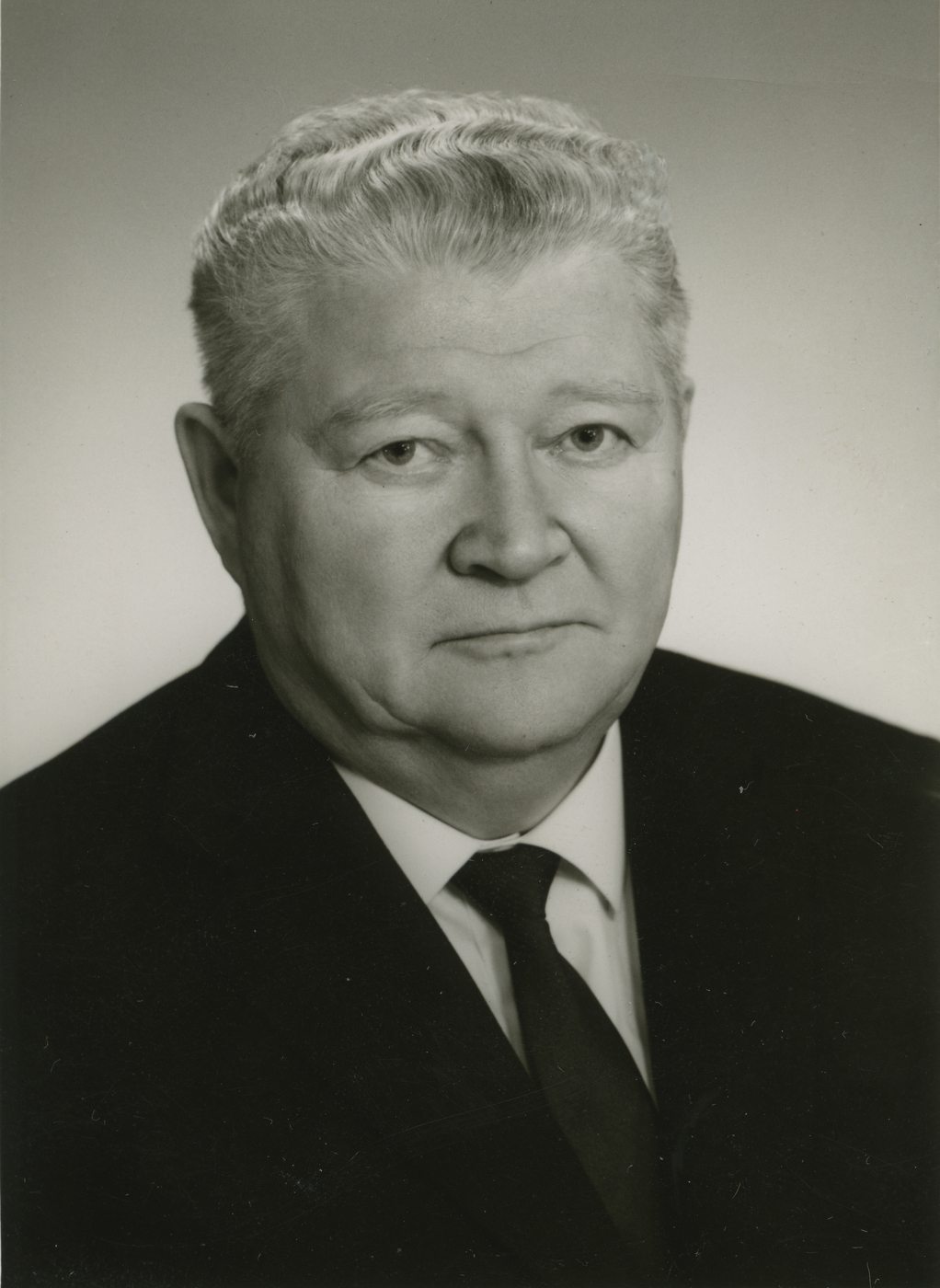
Vilho Väyrynen

Vilho Ferdinand Valdemar Väyrynen (12 March 1912 – 23 March 2000) was a Finnish lawyer and politician. He was Minister of Justice from 3 March to 2 May 1956 and Minister of the Interior from 3 March 1956 to 27 May 1957. He was born in Kemijärvi, and served as a Member of the Parliament of Finland from 1948 to 1962, representing the Social Democratic Party of Finland (SDP).
