= Eino Tainio =

Finnish politician (1905–1970)

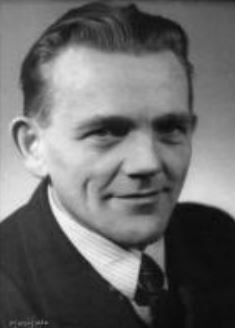

Member of the Parliament of Finland
- In office 6 April 1945 – 22 March 1970
- Constituency: Lapland Province

Personal details
- Born: Eino Alfred Tainio; 8 September 1905 Kemi, Russian Empire
- Died: 23 July 1970 (aged 64) Petrozavodsk, Soviet Union
- Party: Communist Party of Finland
- Other political affiliations: Finnish People's Democratic League
- Occupation: Printer

Eino Alfred Tainio (8 September 1905 – 23 July 1970) was a Finnish printer, politician and member of the Parliament of Finland, the national legislature of Finland. A member of the Communist Party of Finland (SKP) and the Finnish People's Democratic League (SKDL), he represented Lapland Province between April 1945 and March 1970. Prior to being elected, he was imprisoned for twelve years for political reasons.

== Early life ==
Tainio was born on 8 September 1905 in Kemi in the north-west of the Grand Duchy of Finland. He attended folk school and artisan school. He was a printer at Pohjolan Sanomat (1919-1921), Yhtyneet Painot OY (1921-1923) and the labour movement's printing house in Oulu (1923-1925). Following military service, he was Pohjan Voima's editor and office manager in Kemi and Rovaniemi from November 1926 to July 1929. Pohjan Voima was banned following the introduction of anti-communist laws in 1930.

Tainio worked in the gymnastics and sports club in Kemi. He was secretary of the Lapland branch of the Finnish Workers' Sports Federation from 1928 to 1929.

== Politics and imprisonment ==
Tainio joined the Finnish Social Democratic Youth Union (SSN) in 1923 and was elected treasurer of its Karjalahti branch. He joined the banned Communist Party of Finland (SKP) in 1926. Tainio's first encounter with the Etsivä keskuspoliisi (EK) secret police (also known as Ohrana) was whilst he was carrying out military service in Oulu with the Pohja Jaeger Brigade (Pohjan jääkäripataljoona). On 28 June 1926 Tainio and fellow soldier Ahti Näykki were arrested and accused of military espionage but were released after interrogation in Helsinki. He and two other men were arrested in autumn 1928 by border guards in Kuusamo. They were accused of trying to defect to the Soviet Union but were released after interrogation.

In the early hours of 31 July 1929 the EK secret police raided Tainio's home in Kemi and arrested him. On 1 November 1929 the Court of Appeal in Vaasa convicted Tainio of preparing for treason and sentenced him to three years imprisonment with loss of civic rights for a further six years. He was imprisoned in Tammisaari concentration camp before being released in August 1932. He was placed under surveillance by the EK secret police and blacklisted, preventing him from obtaining employment. He was arrested by the secret police on 18 November 1933 for attending a clandestine meeting on the island of Kuivanuoro in Kemi. On 28 March 1934 the Court of Appeal in Vaasa convicted Tainio of preparing for treason and sentenced him to five years imprisonment. He was imprisoned in Tammisaari and Riihimäki Prison before being released on 31 October 1938.

When the Winter War started in November 1939, Tainio condemned the Soviet attack on Finland. Despite this, he was amongst hundreds of leftists who were imprisoned without charge by the state police (Valtiollinen poliisi) starting in December 1939. After being released in May 1940 he worked for the Finland–Soviet Union Peace and Friendship Society (SNS). He was arrested and imprisoned without charge again in September 1940. With the outbreak of the Continuation War in June 1941, Tainio and other imprisoned leftist were forcibly conscripted into the Pärm battalion and sent to the front line. He and others who refused to fight were sent back to the labour camps (Erillinen työkomppania) in Kangasjärvi and Koveri. Following the defeat of the right-wing Finnish government by the Allies in 1944, the SKP was legalised and all political prisoners released in accordance with the Moscow Armistice. Tainio was released on 24 September 1944. He had spent more than twelve years in prison for political reasons.

== Return to politics ==
Tainio was a member of the central committees of the SKP and Finnish People's Democratic League (SKDL). He was the secretary of the Lapland branch of the SKDL in 1945. He was elected to the Parliament of Finland at the 1945 parliamentary election. He was re-elected at the 1948, 1951, 1954, 1958, 1962 and 1966 parliamentary elections. He was not re-elected at the 1970 parliamentary election. He was deputy chairman of the SKDL parliamentary group. He was a presidential elector at the 1950, 1956, 1962 and 1968 presidential elections.

Tainio was one of the leaders of the communist-led strike in Kemi in July/August 1949 that culminated on "Bloody Thursday" (veritorstai) when two strikers were killed by the police on 18 August 1949. Following the 1968 Prague Spring, the SKP was critical of the Soviet-led military intervention. Tainio was a member of the dissident pro-Soviet Communists' Country-wide Advisory Committee (Kommunistien maatakäsittävän neuvottelukunnan) led by Taisto Sinisalo.

Tainio died on 23 July 1970 in Petrozavodsk (Petroskoi) in the Soviet Union. A monument to Tainio sculpted by Ensio Seppänen was erected in 1981 at the Meripuisto park in Kemi.

== See also ==
- List of Finnish MPs imprisoned for political reasons
