= Maija Rask =

Finnish politician (born 1951)

Member of the Parliament of Finland
- In office 22 March 1991 – 20 March 2007
- Constituency: Lapland

Minister of Education
- In office 15 April 1999 – 17 April 2003
- Prime Minister: Paavo Lipponen

Personal details
- Born: 28 January 1951 (age 75) Turku, Finland
- Party: Social Democratic Party
- Education: University of Lapland

Maija-Liisa Rask (born 28 January 1951) is a Finnish retired politician and nurse. She represented Lapland in the Parliament of Finland as a member of the Social Democratic Party from 1991 to 2007. As minister of education from 1999 to 2003, she was one of the 29 signers of the Bologna declaration.

== Biography ==
Rask was born on 28 January 1951 in Turku, Finland. She qualified as a registered nurse in 1974 and as a public health nurse in 1980. From 1974 to 1984, she worked at hospitals in Uppsala and Kemi. Rask received a degree in nursing education from the Kemi Institute of Health Care in 1983, where she became a teacher in 1985. She was elected to the city council of Kemi that year, and she was a presidential elector in the 1988 Finnish presidential election. Rask studied environmental protection at the University of Lapland, and received a degree in 1990.

Rask was elected to the Finnish Parliament in 1991, as the only member of the Social Democratic Party (SDP) to represent Lapland. She sat on several committees during her time in Parliament, including Environment (1991–1995), Social Affairs and Health (1995–1999), Finance (1996–1999), and the Chancellery Commission (1999). She was also the vice chair of the SDP parliamentary group from 1997 to 1999. Rask was re-elected to her seat three times, but lost re-election in 2007.

Prime Minister Paavo Lipponen appointed Rask as minister of education in April 1999, and she held the position for four years until Anneli Jäätteenmäki became prime minister in 2003. In June 1999, Rask and education ministers from 28 other European countries signed the Bologna declaration, which proposed the European Higher Education Area in which students and graduates could move freely between countries. She oversaw other reforms of Finland's education system, including the addition of health education in schools and splitting the national matriculation exam into subject-specific tests. She proposed the development of accelerated medical programs for nurses to become doctors, in response to a shortage of doctors in Finland, but the proposal was opposed by universities.

In 2006, Rask received a master's degree from the University of Lapland, specializing in education. After she left Parliament, she completed the Camino de Santiago pilgrimage to Santiago de Compostela, Spain, in 2011. In 2012, she received the Doctor of Philosophy degree from the University of Lapland. Her doctoral research analysed the results of a 2007 questionnaire about health literacy in secondary schools.

== See also ==
- List of Cabinet Ministers from Finland by ministerial portfolio
