= Heikki Autto =

Finnish politician (born 1984)

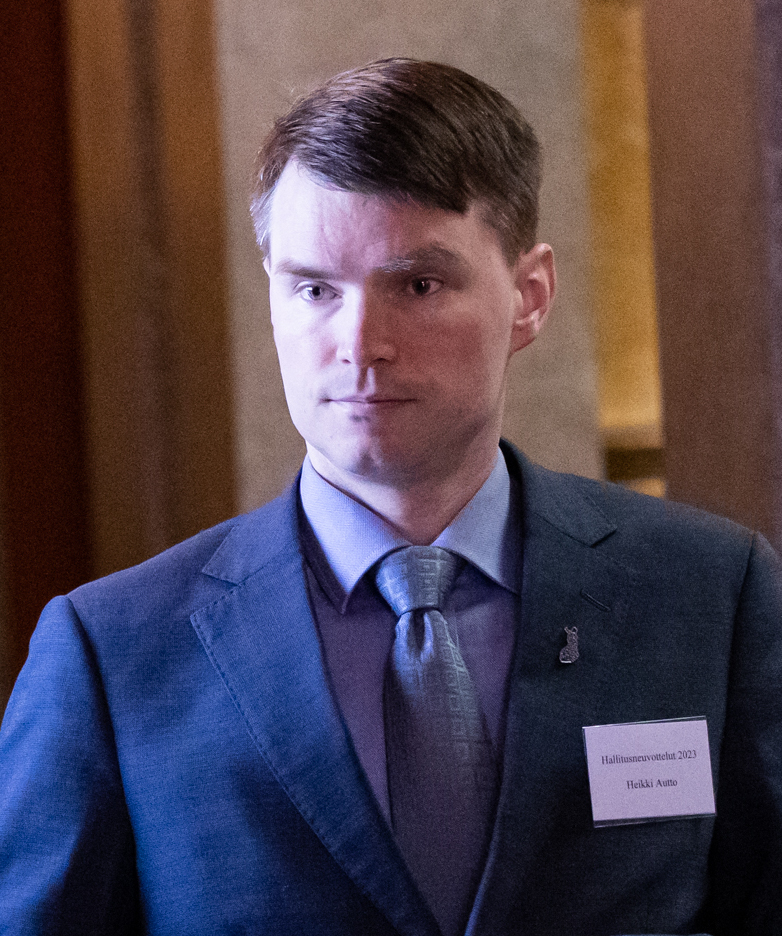

Member of the Finnish Parliament for Lapland

Personal details
- Born: 23 August 1984 (age 41) Enontekiö, Lapland, Finland
- Party: National Coalition Party
- Spouse: Saara Hannele Autto
- Children: 4

Heikki Samuli Autto (born 23 August 1984 in Enontekiö) is a Finnish politician currently serving in the Parliament of Finland for the National Coalition Party at the Lapland constituency. Since 2025 he has chaired the parliament's Defence Committee.

== Political career ==
Autto was first elected to parliament in the 2011 election from the Lapland constituency with 5,025 votes. He lost his seat in the 2015 election, after which he worked as a contact manager at the University of Lapland. He was re-elected in 2019 with 5,467 votes and again in the 2023 election with 7,185 votes.

Autto chaired the Rovaniemi city council from 2009 to 2025, having become at the age of 24 the youngest city council chairperson in Finland; he was succeeded by Eemeli Kajula of the Social Democratic Party. He has chaired the National Coalition Party's party council since 2020.

During his first term (2011–2015), Autto was a member of the Agriculture and Forestry Committee and the Audit Committee. After returning to parliament in 2019, he chaired the Grand Committee, which handles European Union affairs, from 2023 to 2025. In May 2025 the National Coalition Party parliamentary group elected him chair of the Defence Committee, and he was appointed to the Speaker's Council. He is also a member of the Transport and Communications Committee and of Finland's delegation to the Conference of Parliamentarians of the Arctic Region.

== Honors ==
- Knight First Class of the Order of the White Rose of Finland (6.12.2023)
- Medal of Merit of the Finnish Cadet and Officer Corps Association (2018)
