= Heikki Pesonen =

Finnish politician (1895–1964)

Samuli Heikki Pesonen (3 December 1895, Pyhäjärvi – 8 March 1964, Kemi) was a Finnish politician, born in Pyhäjärvi. He was a member of the Parliament of Finland from 1945 to 1948, representing the Social Democratic Party of Finland (SDP).
