= Janne Koivuranta =

Finnish farmer and politician (1885–1967)

Johan Samuel (Janne Samuli) Koivuranta (20 August 1885 – 23 May 1967) was a Finnish farmer and politician, born in Rovaniemi. He was a member of the Parliament of Finland from 1919 to 1945 and from 1948 to 1951, representing the Agrarian League.
