= Toivo Friman =

Finnish lumberjack, carpenter, smallholder and politician (1910–1987)

Toivo Aksel Friman (4 July 1910 – 16 March 1987) was a Finnish lumberjack, carpenter, smallholder and politician, born in Kittilä. He was a member of the Parliament of Finland from 1948 to 1962 and from 1966 to 1970, representing the Finnish People's Democratic League (SKDL). Friman was imprisoned for political reasons from 1932 to 1934 and from 1939 to 1944. He recovered his liberty as a result of the Moscow Armistice of 19 September 1944 and resumed his political activities. He was a presidential elector in the 1950, 1956, 1962 and 1968 presidential elections.
