= Hannele Pokka =

Finnish politician (born 1952)

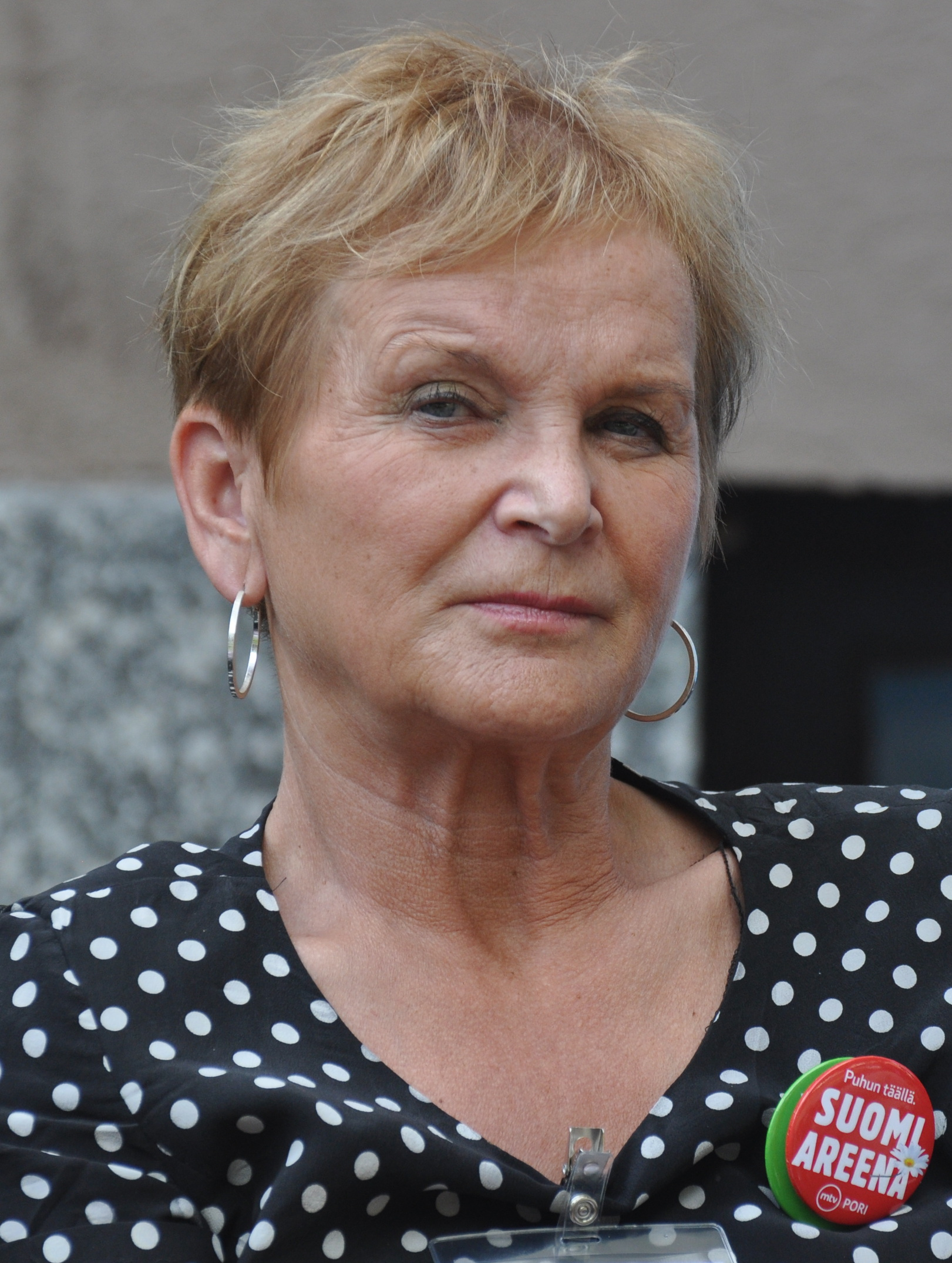

Minister of Justice
- In office 26 April 1991 – 30 April 1994
- Prime Minister: Esko Aho
- Preceded by: Tarja Halonen
- Succeeded by: Anneli Jäätteenmäki

Personal details
- Born: 25 May 1952 (age 74) Ruovesi, Finland
- Party: Centre Party
- Spouse: Esko Tavia

Pirkko Hannele Pokka (born 25 May 1952) is a former governor of the province of Lapland. She was the fifth Governor of Lapland and the first woman to hold the office.

She was married to a municipal administrator Esko Johannes Tavia (1993–2008), and is the mother of a daughter. She has written several romance novels.

She served as Minister of Justice during the Esko Aho's cabinet from April 1991 to April 1994.

== Chronology of her political career ==
- Ministry of Education 1975
- Counsel to the Agricultural Producers' Association 1976–1979
- Associate judge on the Insurance Court 1977–1979
- Member of Parliament 1979–1994
- Minister of Justice 1991–1994
- Governor of Lapland 1994–2008

Political offices
| Preceded by Asko Oinas | Governor of Lapland; 1994–2008 | Succeeded by Timo E. Korva |
| Preceded by Tarja Halonen | Minister of Justice (Finland); 1991–1994 | Succeeded by Anneli Jäätteenmäki |
