= Veikko Hanhirova =

Finnish farmer and politician (1915–2004)

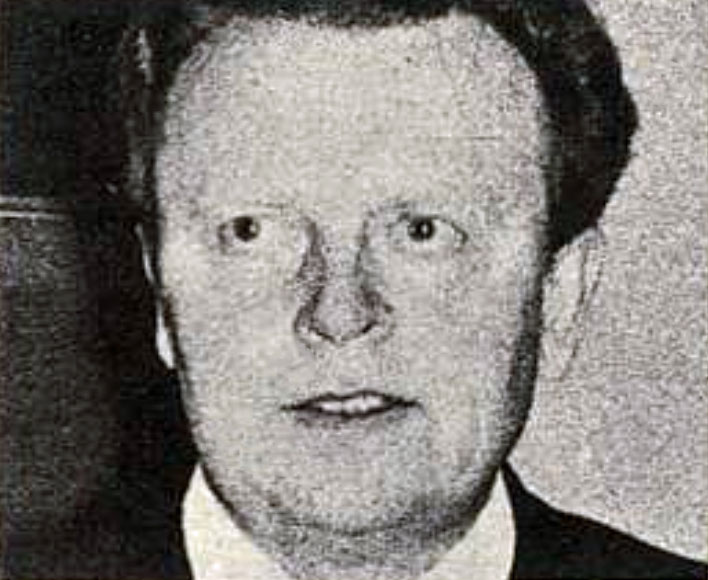
Veikko Hanhirova

Veikko Johannes Hanhirova (9 January 1915 – 9 September 2004) was a Finnish farmer and politician, born in Karunki. He was a member of the Parliament of Finland from 1966 to 1972 and from 1975 to 1979, representing the Centre Party. He was a presidential elector in the 1962, 1968 and 1978 presidential elections.
