= Akseli Paarman =

Finnish farmer, bank director and politician (1904–2000)

Aksel (Akseli) Arvid Paarman (1 December 1904 – 9 February 2000) was a Finnish farmer, bank director and politician, born in Sodankylä. He was a member of the Parliament of Finland from 1958 to 1966 and from 1969 to 1970, representing the Agrarian League, which changed its name to Centre Party in 1965. He was a presidential elector in the 1962 Finnish presidential election.
