= Eino Sääskilahti =

Finnish politician (1922–2005)

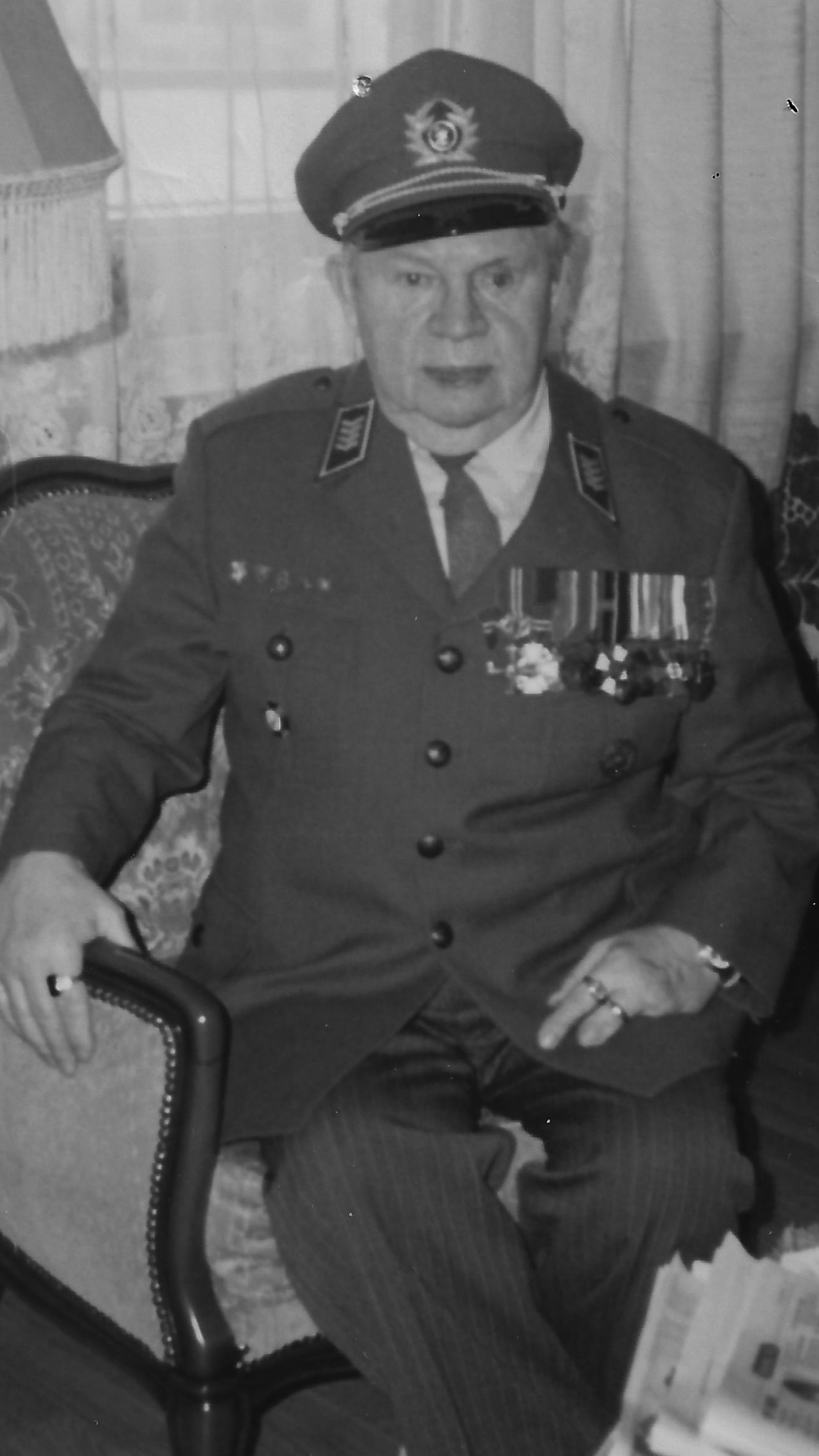

Eino Martti Sääskilahti (1 April 1922 – 16 March 2005) was a Finnish politician, born in Rovaniemen maalaiskunta. He was a member of the Parliament of Finland from 1962 to 1970, representing the Agrarian League, which changed its name to Centre Party in 1965. He was a presidential elector in the 1956, 1962 and 1968 presidential elections.
