= Erkki Koivisto =

Finnish Lutheran pastor and politician (1908–1972)

Risto Eerikki (Erkki) Koivisto (14 June 1908 – 28 May 1972) was a Finnish Lutheran pastor and politician, born in Ii. He was a member of the Parliament of Finland from 1945 to 1966, representing the National Coalition Party. He was a presidential elector in the 1950, 1956, 1962 and 1968 presidential elections.
