= Esko-Juhani Tennilä =

Finnish politician (1947–2024)

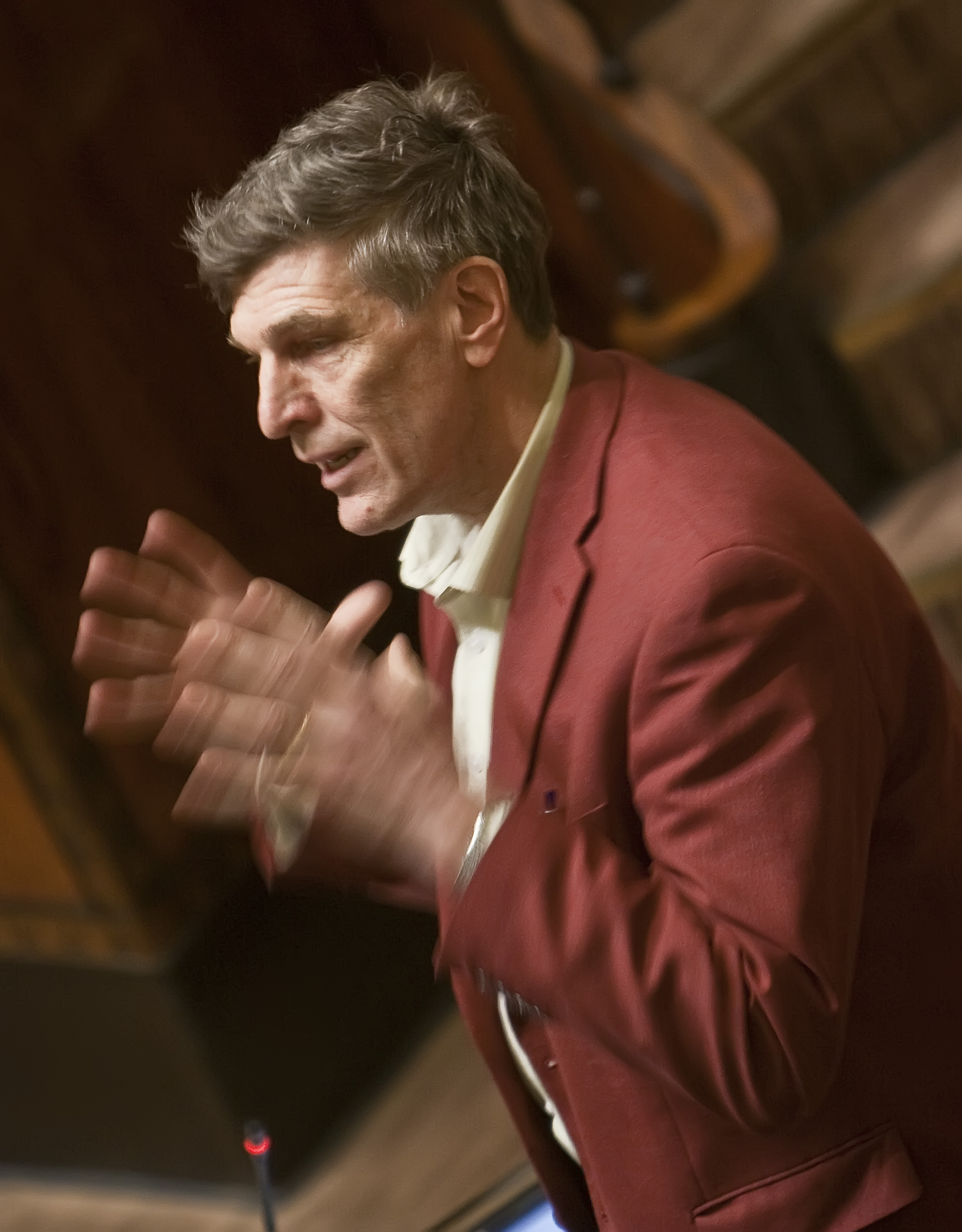
Tennilä in 2009

Esko-Juhani Tennilä (10 October 1947 – 6 April 2024) was a Finnish leftist politician from Lapland and member of Parliament since 1975 until 2011.

== Life and career ==
Tennilä was born in Rovaniemen maalaiskunta and studied at the University of Tampere. He worked as reporter for Hämeen Yhteistyö 1966–1975.

Tennilä was elected to Parliament from lists of SKDL 1975–1979, as independent 1983, as a representative of DeVa in 1987, and representative of Left Alliance from 1991.

Tennilä was member of pro-Soviet opposition on Communist Party of Finland that was expelled from the party in 1986 and formed DeVa. He was chairman of Communist Party of Finland (Unity) in 1989–1990. Tennilä left the chairmanship in 1990 as he joined Left Alliance.

Tennilä was internal critic of Left Alliance politics and was dismissed in 1995 from Left Alliance's parliamentary group as he opposed joining the Paavo Lipponen's first cabinet. He returned to list of Left Alliance in 1999 elections.

Tennilä profiled himself as representative of Northern Finland and was in 2003 the most popular of the elected representatives in Lapland constituency.

Tennilä also wrote poetry and children's books. He died on 6 April 2024, at the age of 76.

== Sources ==
- https://web.archive.org/web/20071026084525/http://www.eduskunta.fi/triphome/bin/hex5000.sh?hnro=278&kieli=su (Finnish)
