= Tuure Salo =

Finnish lawyer, bank director and politician (1921–2006)

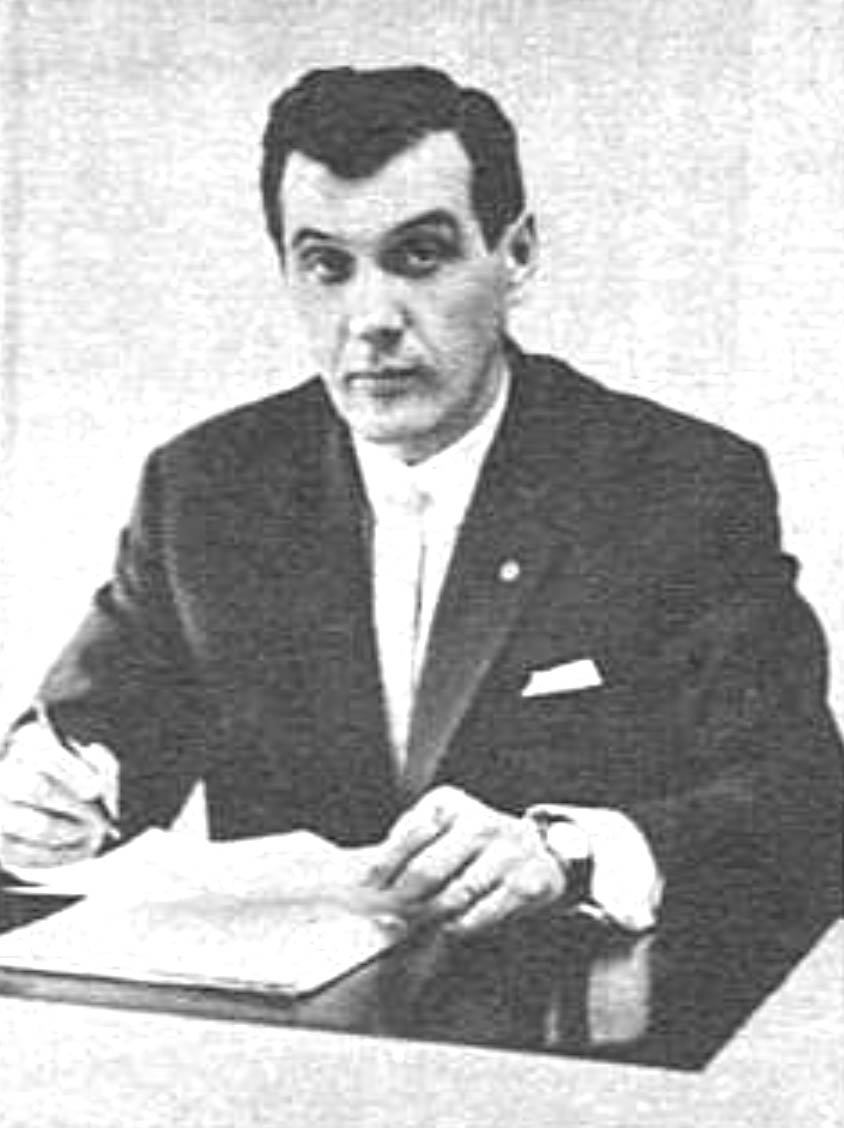
Tuure Salo

Tuure Olavi Hermanni Salo (7 February 1921 – 19 April 2006) was a Finnish lawyer, bank director and politician, born in Rovaniemi. He was a member of the Parliament of Finland from 1962 to 1970, representing the People's Party of Finland until 1965 and the Liberal People's Party (LKP) after that. He served as Minister of Justice and Deputy Minister of the Interior from 15 May 1977 to 2 March 1978. Salo was the mayor of Rovaniemi from 1963 to 1984. He was a presidential elector in the 1968 Finnish presidential election.
