= Olavi Lahtela =

Finnish politician

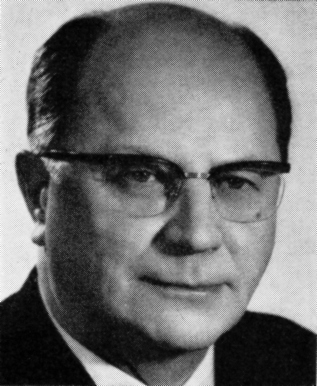
Olavi Lahtela

Olavi Aleksanteri Lahtela (3 June 1915 – 29 December 1968) was a Finnish politician, born in Kemijärvi. He served as Deputy Minister of Communications from 1 November to 18 December 1963. Lahtela was a Member of the Parliament of Finland from 1958 until his death in 1968. He was the son of Matti Lahtela.
