= Matti Lahtela =

Finnish farmer, business executive and politician (1881–1961)

Matias (Matti) Oskari (M. O.) Lahtela (29 June 1881 – 24 March 1961) was a Finnish farmer, business executive and politician, born in Kemijärvi. He was a member of the Parliament of Finland from 1930 to 1958, representing the Agrarian League. He was the father of Olavi Lahtela.
