= Lauri Kaijalainen =

Finnish journalist and politician

Lauri Vihtori Kaijalainen (21 March 1900, Laukaa – 5 September 1965) was a Finnish journalist and politician who served as Minister of Transport and Public Works from 26 March 1946 to 29 July 1948. He was a member of the Parliament of Finland from 1930 to 1948, representing the Agrarian League.
