= Urho Knuuti =

Finnish politician (1918–1988)

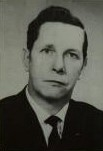
Knuuti in 1872

Urho Einari Knuuti (25 November 1918 – 1 June 1988) was a Finnish politician, born in Keminmaa. He was a member of the Parliament of Finland from 1966 to 1972, representing the Social Democratic Party of Finland (SDP). He was a presidential elector in the 1968 Finnish presidential election.
