= Johanna Ojala-Niemelä =

Finnish politician

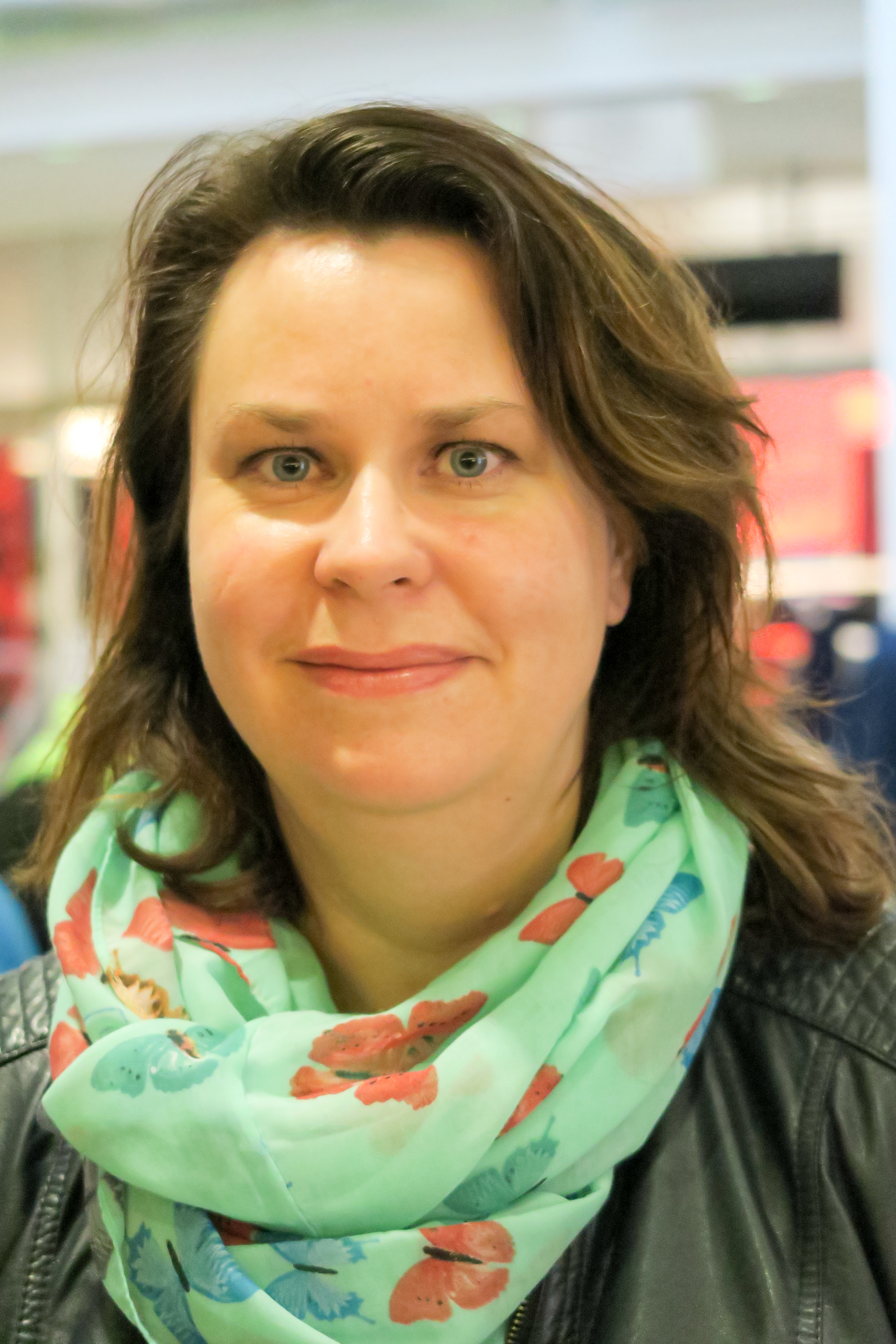

Member of the Finnish Parliament for Lapland
- Incumbent
- Assumed office 21 March 2007

Personal details
- Born: October 1, 1974 (age 51) Muonio, Lapland, Finland
- Party: Social Democratic Party of Finland

Johanna Katriina Ojala-Niemelä (born 1 October 1974 in Muonio) is a Finnish politician currently serving in the Parliament of Finland for the Social Democratic Party of Finland at the Lapland constituency.
