= Pekka Vilmi =

Finnish politician

Pekka Alfred Vilmi (1 October 1915 – 16 February 1999) was a Finnish politician, born in Simo. He was a Member of the Parliament of Finland from 1963 to 1979, representing the Agrarian League, which renamed itself the Centre Party in 1965.
