= Jouni Mykkänen =

Finnish politician (born 1939)

Jouni Mykkänen (born 6 October 1939 in Helsinki) is a Finnish journalist and politician. He was a member of the Parliament of Finland from 1970 to 1974, representing the National Coalition Party.
