= Hannes Manninen =

Finnish politician

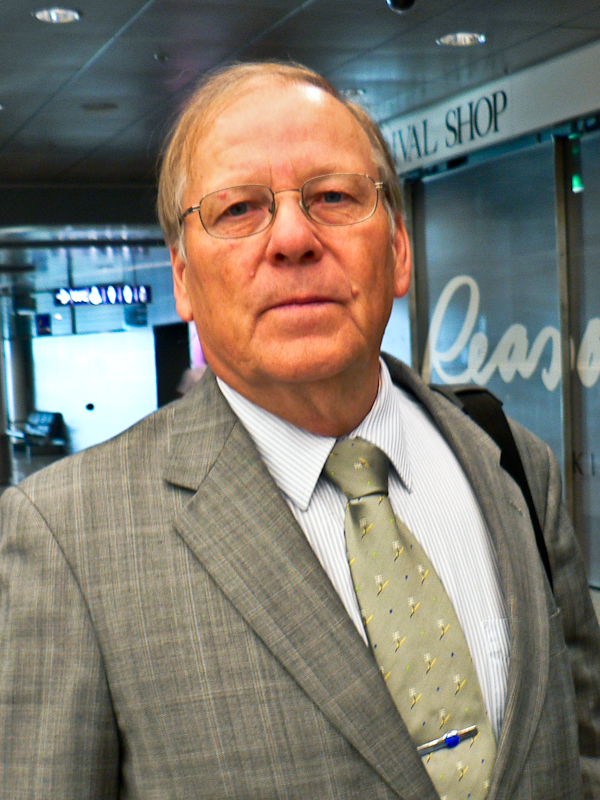
Hannes Manninen

Hannes Manninen (born 20 December 1946) is a Finnish politician of the Centre Party, born in Kuusamo. He has been a member of the Parliament of Finland since 1995 and Minister of Regional and Municipal Affairs of Finland 2003–2007.

Preceded by Martti Korhonen	Minister of Regional and Municipal Affairs (Finland); 2003–2007	Succeeded by Mari Kiviniemi
