= Janne Seurujärvi =

Finnish politician

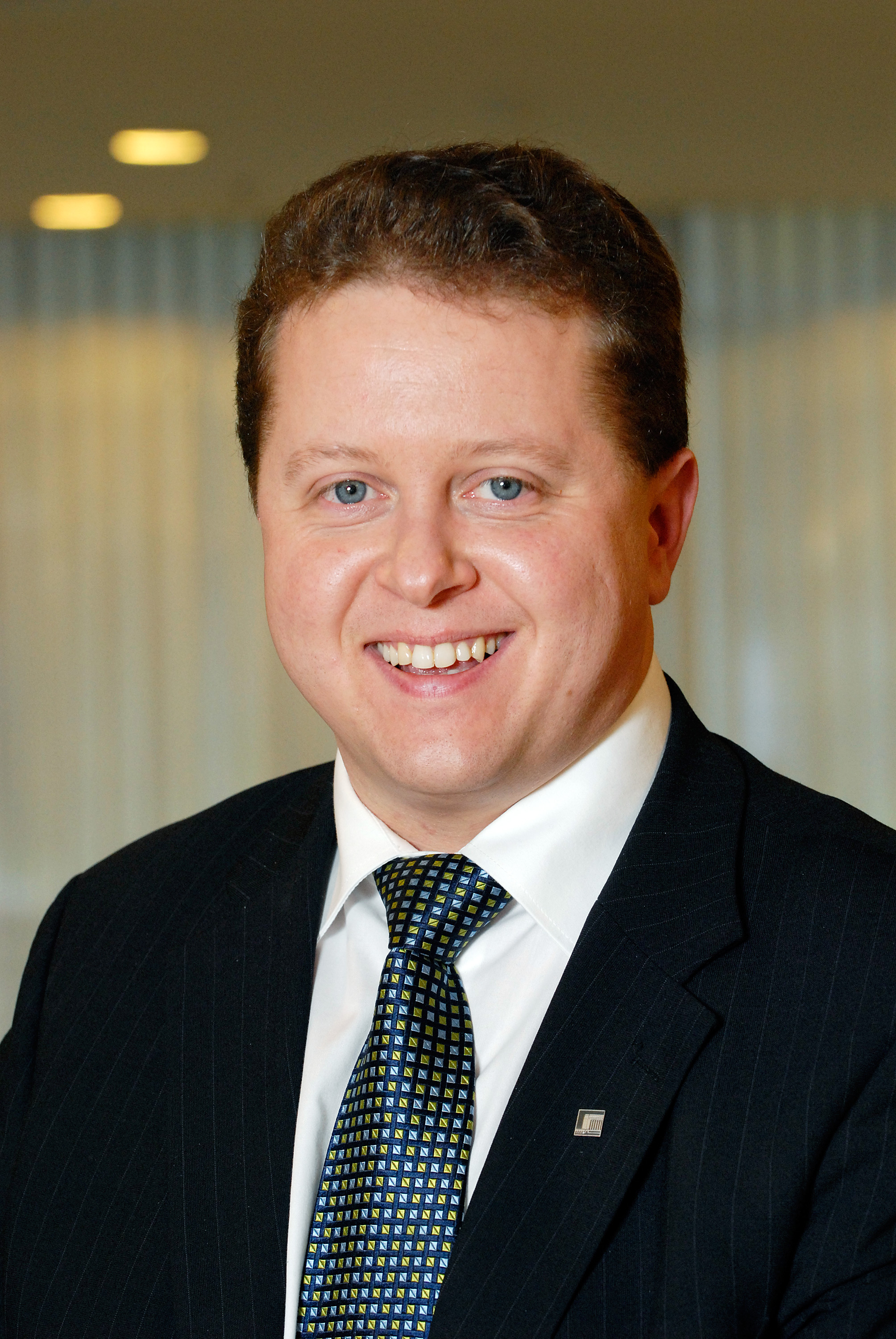
Janne Seurujärvi

Janne Antero Seurujärvi (born 15 May 1975 in Inari, Finland) is a Finnish Sami politician. He was the first Sami ever to be elected to the Finnish Parliament. Seurujärvi represents the Finnish Centre Party (Keskusta). Seurujärvi was a member of the Finnish Parliament from 2007 to 2011. Seurujärvi is the CEO of Saariselkä ltd., one of the biggest holiday resorts in Finnish Lapland.
