= Markus Mustajärvi =

Finnish politician

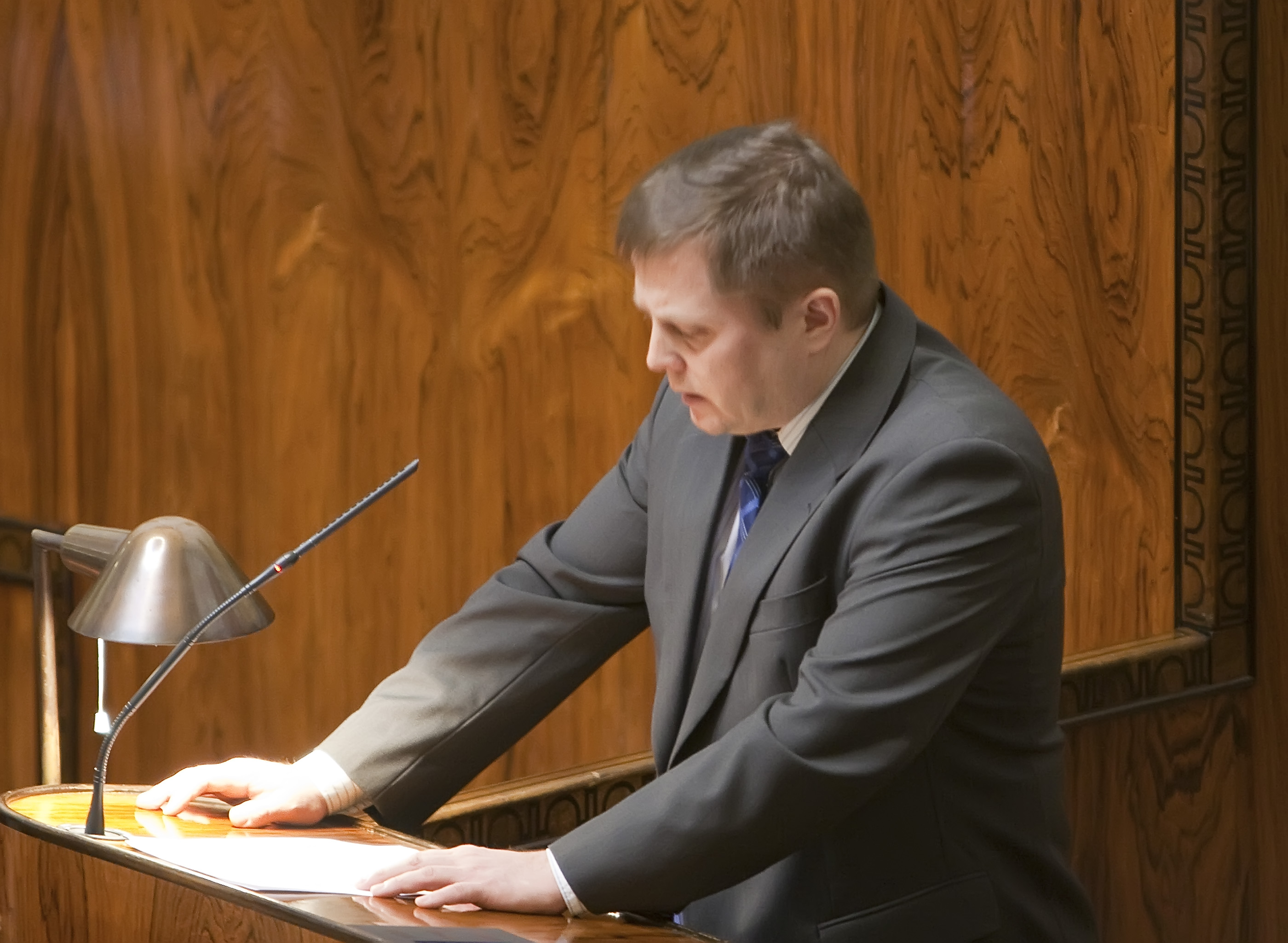
- Markus Mustajärvi in the Finnish Parliament in 2009

Member of the Finnish Parliament
- In office 16 March 2003 – 2 April 2023
- Constituency: Lapland

Personal details
- Born: 24 February 1963 (age 63) Savukoski, Lapland, Finland
- Party: Left Alliance
- Education: University of Jyväskylä

Markus Mustajärvi (born 24 February 1963) is a Finnish politician for the Left Alliance. He represented Lapland in the Parliament of Finland from 2003 until 2023.

== Life and career ==
Mustajärvi was born in Savukoski, Lapland. He graduated as ylioppilas in 1982, forestry engineer in 1988 and Master of Social Sciences in 1993, the last degree being from the University of Jyväskylä. He was a member of the City Council of Kemijärvi until 2012 when he switched to Municipal Council of Savukoski.

On 30 June 2011, Mustajärvi and fellow MP Jyrki Yrttiaho were expelled from the Left Alliance parliamentary group because they had voted for a motion of no confidence against the Katainen Cabinet in which the Left Alliance was represented. Mustajärvi and Yrttiaho founded a new opposition parliamentary group called the Left Faction in September 2011. After the 2015 election, Mustajärvi was allowed to return to the Left Alliance parliamentary group.

On 17 May 2022, Mustajärvi was one of 8 MPs who voted against Finland joining NATO following the Russian invasion of Ukraine stating an opposition to making Finland's border "the border between the military alliance and Russia."

== Personal life ==
Mustajärvi is married to Vietnamese-born Ivana Nguyen.
