= Kemijärvi =

Kemijärvi Giemajávri Kiemâjävri Ǩeeʹmmjäuʹrr
- Town
- Kemijärven kaupunki Kemijärvi stad
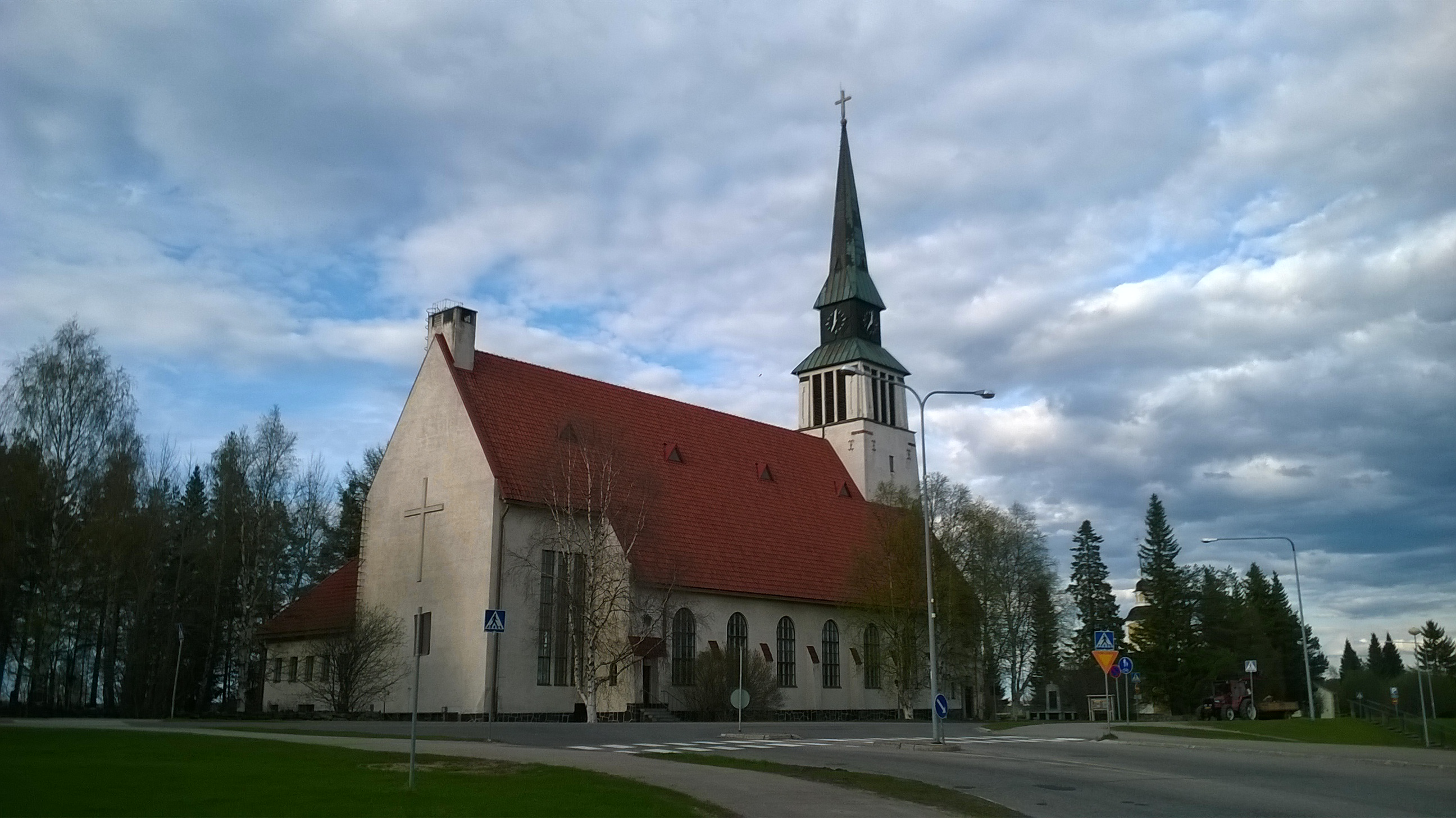
- Kemijärvi Church

- Coat of arms

- Location of Kemijärvi in Finland
- Interactive map of Kemijärvi
- Coordinates: 66°43′N 027°26′E
- Country: Finland
- Region: Lapland
- Sub-region: Eastern Lapland
- Charter: 1957
- City rights: 1973

Government
  - Town manager: Pekka Iivari

Area (2018-01-01)
  - Total: 3,930.91 km^{2} (1,517.73 sq mi)
  - Land: 3,504.39 km^{2} (1,353.05 sq mi)
  - Water: 425.84 km^{2} (164.42 sq mi)
  - Rank: 13th largest in Finland

Population (2025-12-31)
  - Total: 6,919
  - Rank: 133rd largest in Finland
  - Density: 1.97/km^{2} (5.1/sq mi)

Population by native language
  - Finnish: 94.3% (official)
  - Others: 5.7%

Population by age
  - 0 to 14: 9.7%
  - 15 to 64: 50.3%
  - 65 or older: 40%
- Time zone: UTC+02:00 (EET)
  - Summer (DST): UTC+03:00 (EEST)
- Website: www.kemijarvi.fi

Kemijärvi (Northern Sami: Giemajávri; Inari Sami: Kiemâjävri; Skolt Sami: Ǩeeʹmmjäuʹrr) is a town and municipality of Finland. It is located in the sub-region of Eastern Lapland.

== History ==
The first permanent settler inhabitant of Kemijärvi was Paavali Ollinpoika Halonen, who moved from the region of Oulu, from Niskakylä, Utajärvi to Kemijärvi about 1580. His wife was Anna Laurintytär Halonen, and they had children. Paavali's place of residence is known today as Halosenranta. Previously the area was inhabited exclusively by the Sami people.

During the Winter War Kemijärvi was bombed to such an extent that over half of the buildings were destroyed. On 20 December 1939, a battle took place on the nearby hill of Mäntyvaara, between the Finnish Salla battalion and 596th battalion of the Soviet Union. The battle lasted 4 hours, ending in Finnish victory, with the Salla battalion losing 17 soldiers. After the battle, Finns found a large amount of weapons left behind by the fleeing Soviets. Bodies of 180 Soviet soldiers were buried near the hill, with some sources claiming over 300 Soviet soldiers losing their lives.

On 9 May 1986, a BAE Hawk Mk 51 crashed in Kemijärvi while practising for a flight display due to loss of orientation. The pilot, First Lieutenant M. Kähkönen, died upon impact.

== Transport ==
The railway reached Kemijärvi in 1934. It was extended north to Salla and what is now Russia during World War II, though the line is currently moribund beyond Kemijärvi. Kemijärvi railway station has passenger train service to Rovaniemi, Oulu and Helsinki. The direct overnight train service between Kemijärvi and Helsinki was controversially withdrawn in September 2006, with VR (Finnish Railways) stating that its new sleeping car trains could not operate with the diesel locomotives needed for the (then) non-electrified railway north of Rovaniemi.

A year later, the Ministry of Transport and Communications and VR reached an agreement concerning partial public funding of the service, which was restored in 2008 with a diesel generator car supplying head-end power to the passenger cars. The generator car disappeared from the train in March 2014 when the electrification extension from Rovaniemi to Kemijärvi was inaugurated, an event which also assured Kemijärvi a permanent place in the VR network.

== Geography ==
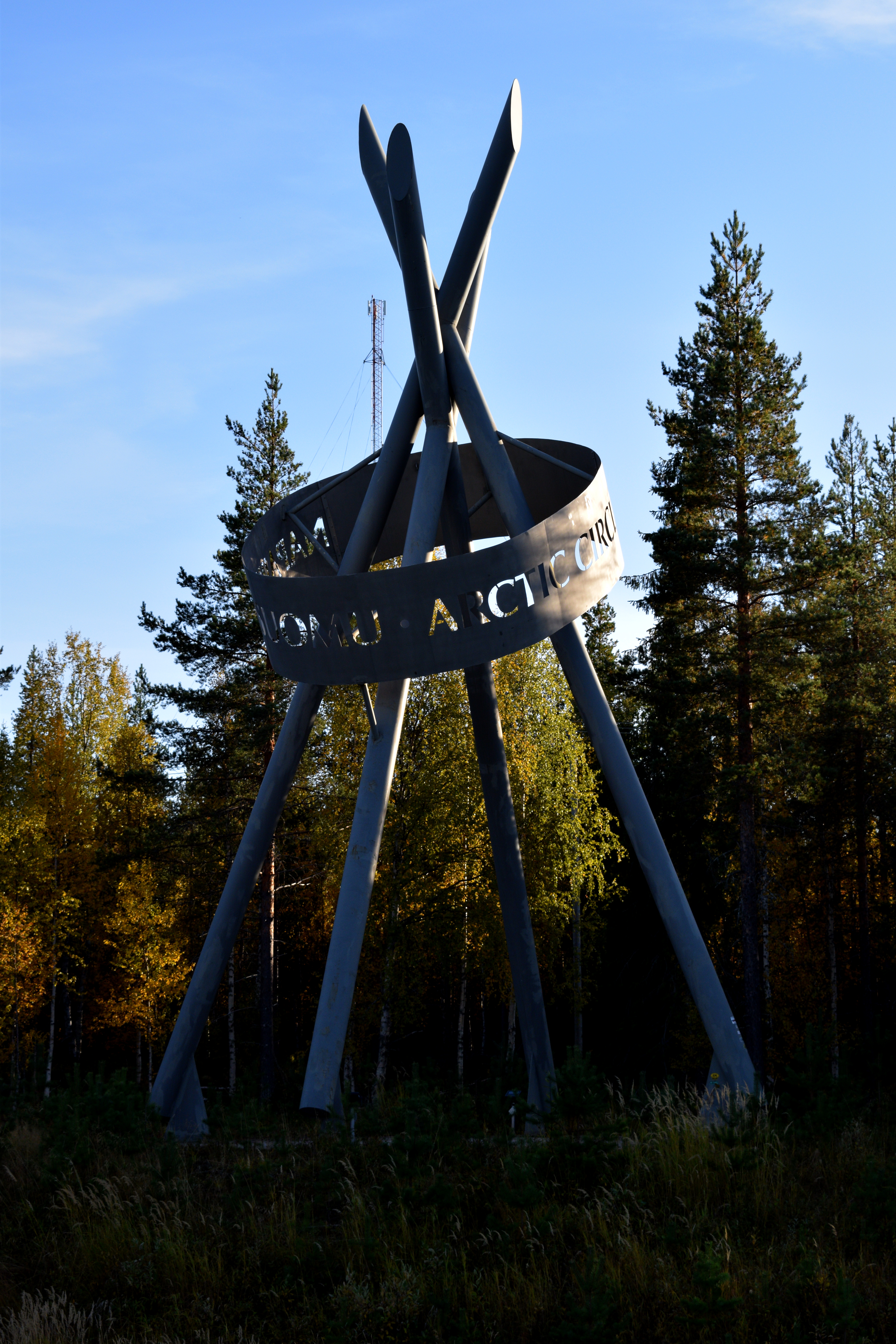
Arctic Circle monument in Kemijärvi

Surrounding municipalities are Pelkosenniemi in the north, Salla in the east, Posio in the south and Rovaniemi in the west.

=== Climate ===
Kemijärvi has a subarctic climate (Köppen: Dfc).

Climate data for Kemijarvi
Month	Jan	Feb	Mar	Apr	May	Jun	Jul	Aug	Sep	Oct	Nov	Dec	Year
Mean daily maximum °C (°F)	−8.5 (16.7)	−7.7 (18.1)	−2.3 (27.9)	3.8 (38.8)	10.4 (50.7)	16.3 (61.3)	19.4 (66.9)	16.8 (62.2)	10.9 (51.6)	3.0 (37.4)	−2.5 (27.5)	−5.7 (21.7)	4.5 (40.1)
Daily mean °C (°F)	−11.2 (11.8)	−10.5 (13.1)	−6.2 (20.8)	0.1 (32.2)	6.5 (43.7)	12.6 (54.7)	15.6 (60.1)	13.1 (55.6)	7.8 (46.0)	1.1 (34.0)	−4.4 (24.1)	−8.2 (17.2)	1.4 (34.4)
Mean daily minimum °C (°F)	−14.1 (6.6)	−13.5 (7.7)	−10.2 (13.6)	−3.9 (25.0)	2.1 (35.8)	8.2 (46.8)	11.4 (52.5)	9.2 (48.6)	4.7 (40.5)	−1.0 (30.2)	−6.6 (20.1)	−10.9 (12.4)	−2.0 (28.3)
Average precipitation mm (inches)	40.9 (1.61)	35.4 (1.39)	34.1 (1.34)	36.3 (1.43)	50.3 (1.98)	73.2 (2.88)	86.4 (3.40)	80.1 (3.15)	67.2 (2.65)	55.1 (2.17)	45.1 (1.78)	46.5 (1.83)	650.6 (25.61)
Source: Weather.Directory

== Population ==
The municipality has a population of 6,919 (31 December 2025) and covers an area of 3,930.91 square kilometres (1,517.73 sq mi) of which 425.84 km^{2} (164.42 sq mi) is water. The population density is 1.97 inhabitants per square kilometre (5.1/sq mi).

== Notable people ==
- Pentti Kouri, investor and economist
- Matti Lahtela, Member of Parliament, municipal and provincial politician
- Olavi Lahtela, Member of Parliament and Minister
- Markus Mustajärvi, Member of Parliament
- Kari Väänänen, actor, screenwriter and director

== Twin towns and sister cities ==
Kemijärvi is twinned with:

- Kandalaksha, Russia, since 1988
- Sōbetsu, Japan, since 1993
- Vadsø, Norway, since 1961
