= Lea Mäkipää =

Finnish politician (born 1947)

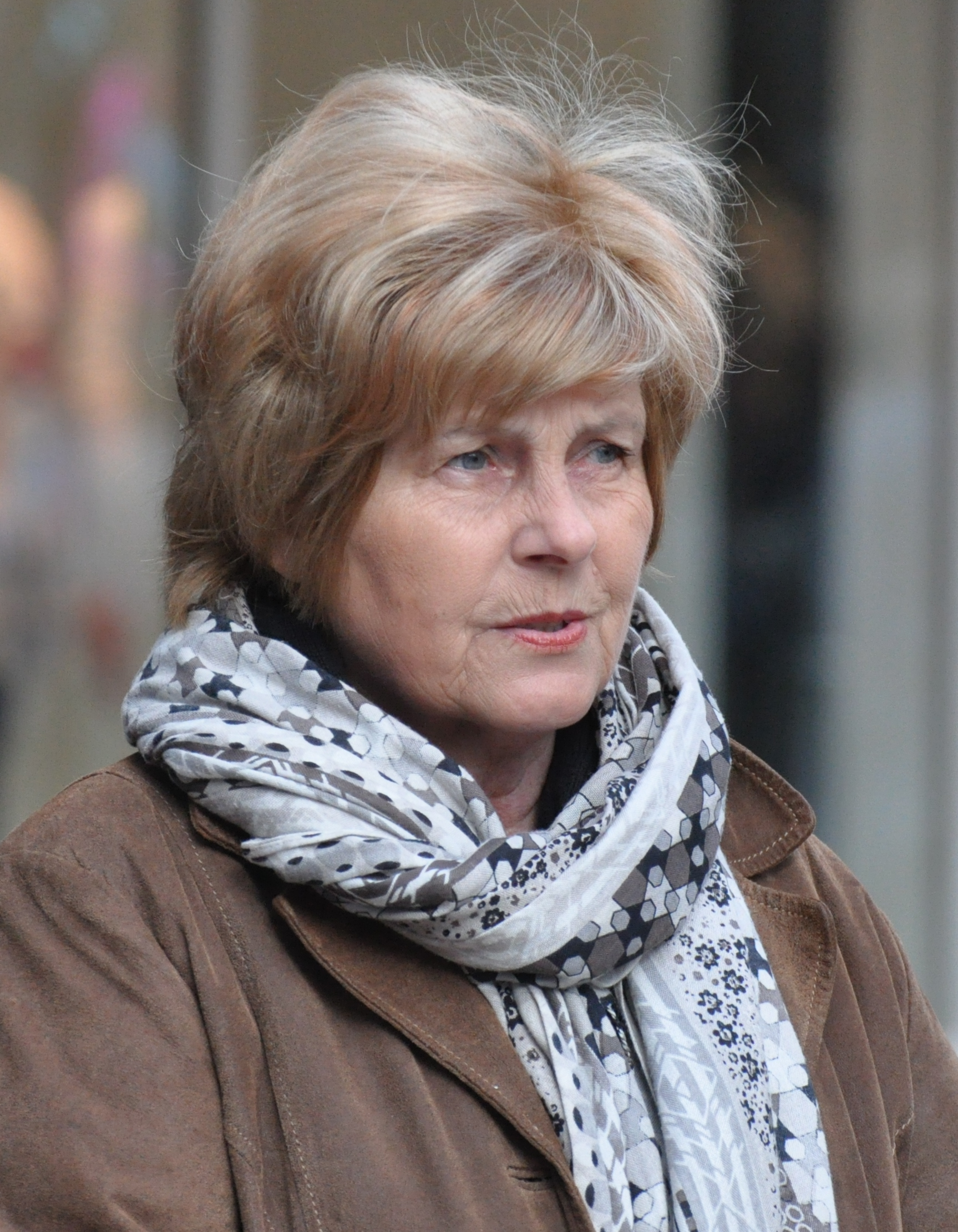

Member of Finnish Parliament
- In office 20 April 2011 – 16 April 2019
- Constituency: Pirkanmaa

Member of Finnish Parliament
- In office 26 March 1983 – 23 March 1995
- Constituency: Satakunta

Personal details
- Born: 6 May 1947 (age 79) Kihniö, Finland
- Party: Blue Reform (2017–2019); Finns Party (2011–2017)
- Website: www.leamakipaa.fi

Lea Kaarina Mäkipää (born 6 May 1947) is a Finnish former politician. Born in Kihniö, Mäkipää first served on the city's municipal council in 1981. She was first elected to the Finnish Parliament in 1983 as a member of the Finnish Rural Party, and was re-elected in 1987 and 1991. While in Parliament, she served on the Committee on Finance and the Committee on Labor and Equal Opportunities. She was also deputy chairperson of the Rural Party from 1985 to 1990 and served as the chairperson of its parliamentary members from 1994 to 1995.

In the 1995 elections, Mäkipää lost her seat in Parliament, and shortly afterward the Rural Party rebranded itself as the Finns Party, which she joined. She remained a member of the municipal council, and continued to run in the following three elections, failing to win a seat each time. In the 2007 elections, Mäkipää received 3,250 votes, placing her 35th in the Pirkanmaa district the top 18 won spots in Parliament, though she was chosen as a reserve member if a substitute was needed. In 2011, she ran again, this time receiving 9,034 votes and rejoining Parliament; she was re-elected in 2015 with 6,124 votes. She currently serves on the Foreign Affairs Committee, Audit Committee, and Defense Committee.

In 2017, Mäkipää was one of 20 Parliament representatives who jumped from the Finns Party to the Blue Reform party, opposing the party's new leader Jussi Halla-aho over his policies on immigration. She did not run in the 2019 elections, and retired from politics.
