= Helvi Koskinen =

Finnish politician (1930–1990)

Helvi Koskinen (née Vahvelainen; 7 January 1930, in Vahviala 7 January 1990) was a Finnish politician. She was a member of the Parliament of Finland from 1983 to 1987, representing the Finnish Rural Party (SMP).
