= Usadishche =

Usadishche may refer to:

- Usadishche, Volkhovsky District, Leningrad Oblast, a village in Volkhovsky District, Leningrad Oblast, Russia
- Usadishche, Vyborgsky District, Leningrad Oblast, a former rural locality in Vyborgsky District, Leningrad Oblast, Russia
