= Veikko Vennamo =

Finnish politician

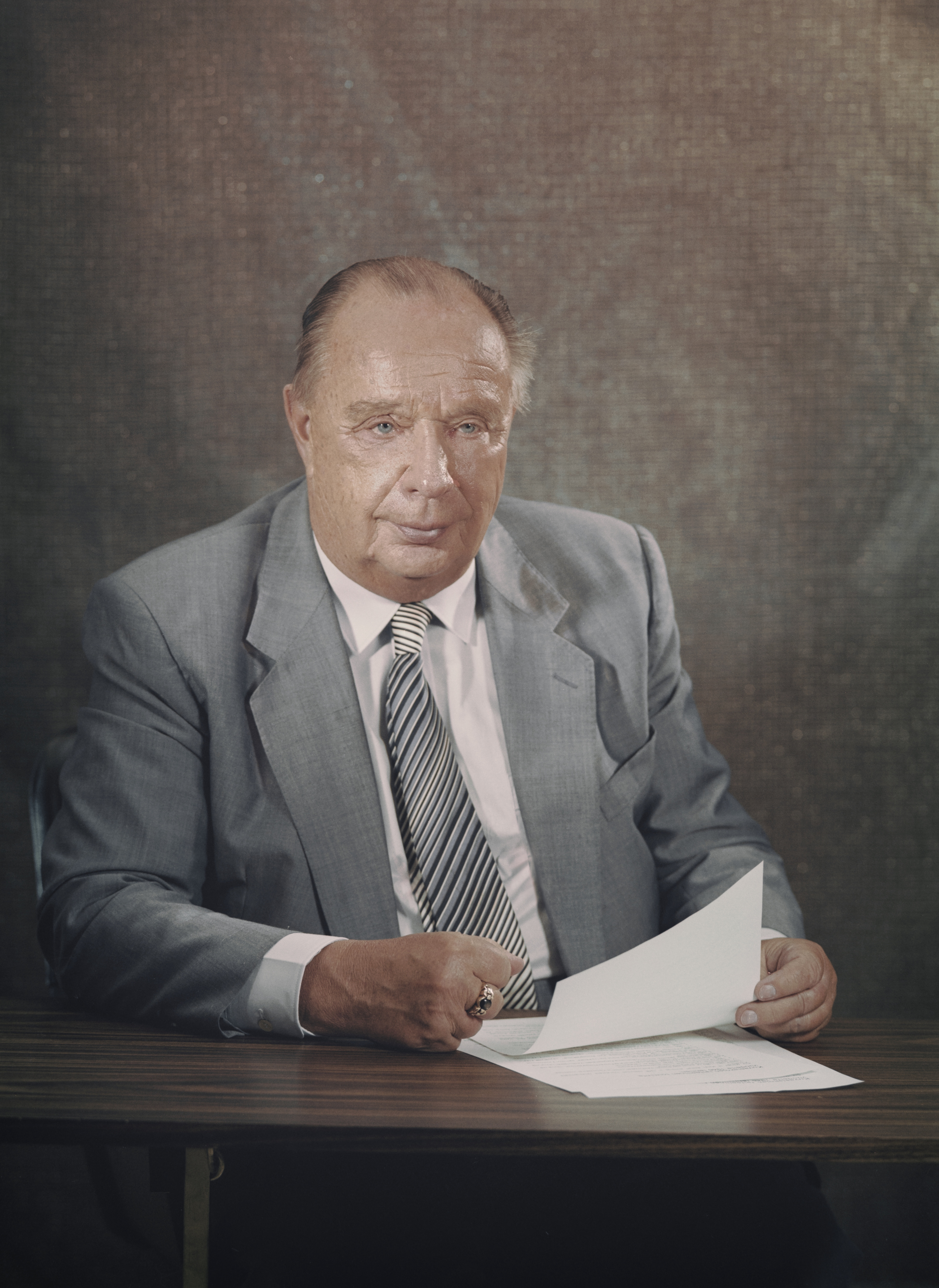
Veikko Vennamo in 1988

Veikko Emil Aleksander Vennamo (originally Fennander) (11 June 1913 – 12 June 1997) was a Finnish politician. In 1959, he founded the Finnish Rural Party (Suomen Maaseudun Puolue), which was succeeded by the True Finns in 1995. He had originally been the leader of a faction of the Agrarian League. When his opponent, Urho Kekkonen, was elected president of Finland, Vennamo broke off his Agrarian League affiliation. Vennamo was a member of Parliament in 1945–1962 and 1966–1987. He was also the director of the Agricultural ministry's Resettlement office in 1944–1959 and was responsible for the resettlement of the farmers evacuated from the ceded Karelia. Later he was a department director at the Board of Customs.

Vennamo was born in Jaakkima, Ladoga Karelia, now in Russia. He was one of the loudest and most prominent critics of President Kekkonen. He also criticized the centre-left governments of the 1960s and 1970s for worsening the living conditions of small farmers and poor workers, for example by favouring the big cities at the expense of the rural towns by abolishing small schools and grocery stores. Vennamo became famous for using simple slogans (kyllä kansa tietää!, "the people do know!") and catchphrases, some of which became popular terms such as "the forgotten people" and rötösherra (a pejorative for corrupted politicians).

He was a presidential candidate in 1968, 1978 and 1982. In the 1968 presidential election, he negatively surprised President Kekkonen and his centre-left allies by getting 11% of the votes. The populist Rural Party got 9% of the deputies in the 1970 and 1972 parliamentary elections, and 8.5% of the deputies in the 1983 parliamentary elections. Vennamo's autocratic manner of leading his party caused the majority of the newly elected Rural Party MPs to defect and form a new party called Finnish People's Unity Party in 1972. Vennamo also encouraged his parliamentary group to make hundreds of bills for the legislature. He became more notorious when he had to be carried out of a parliamentary session by the janitors after defying the speaker's orders in 1974. After the 1983 elections, the Rural Party was allowed to join the government, but Vennamo preferred not to become a cabinet minister.

In the 1988 presidential election, he supported the reelection of President Mauno Koivisto. He was the father of politician and corporate executive Pekka Vennamo.

== See also ==
- Politics of Finland
