= 1970 Finnish parliamentary election =

General election

- 15–16 March 1970

All 200 seats in the Parliament of Finland 101 seats needed for a majority
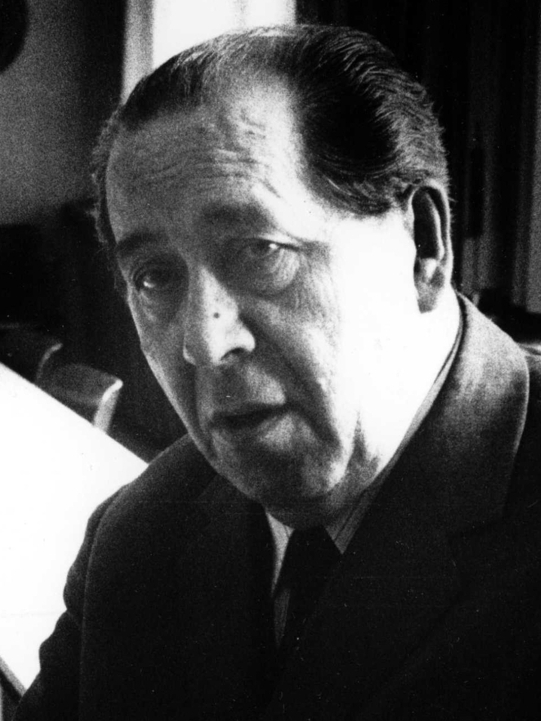

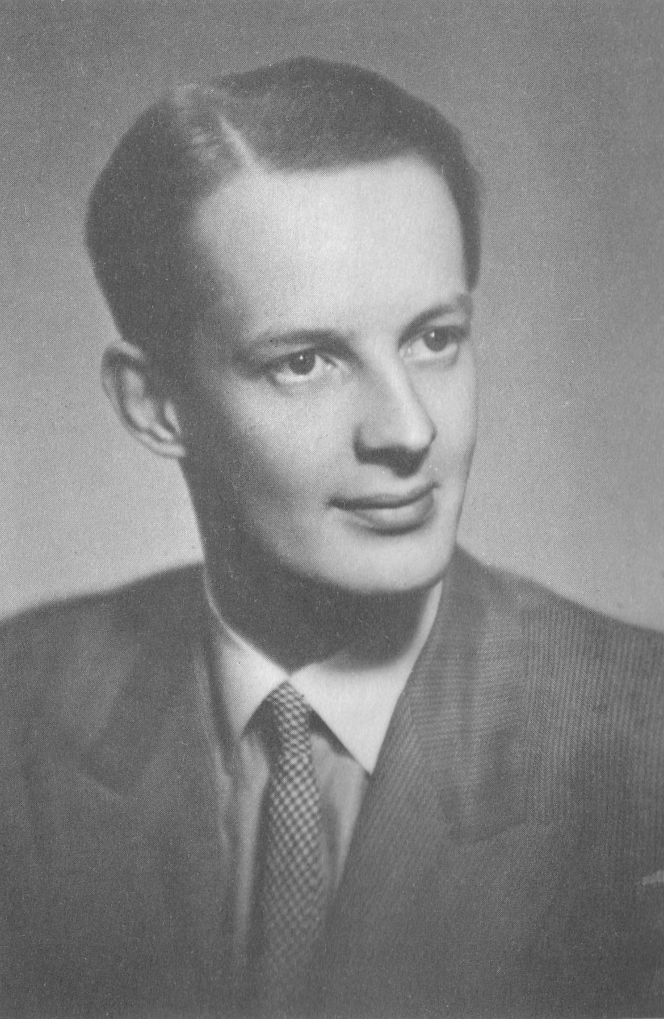

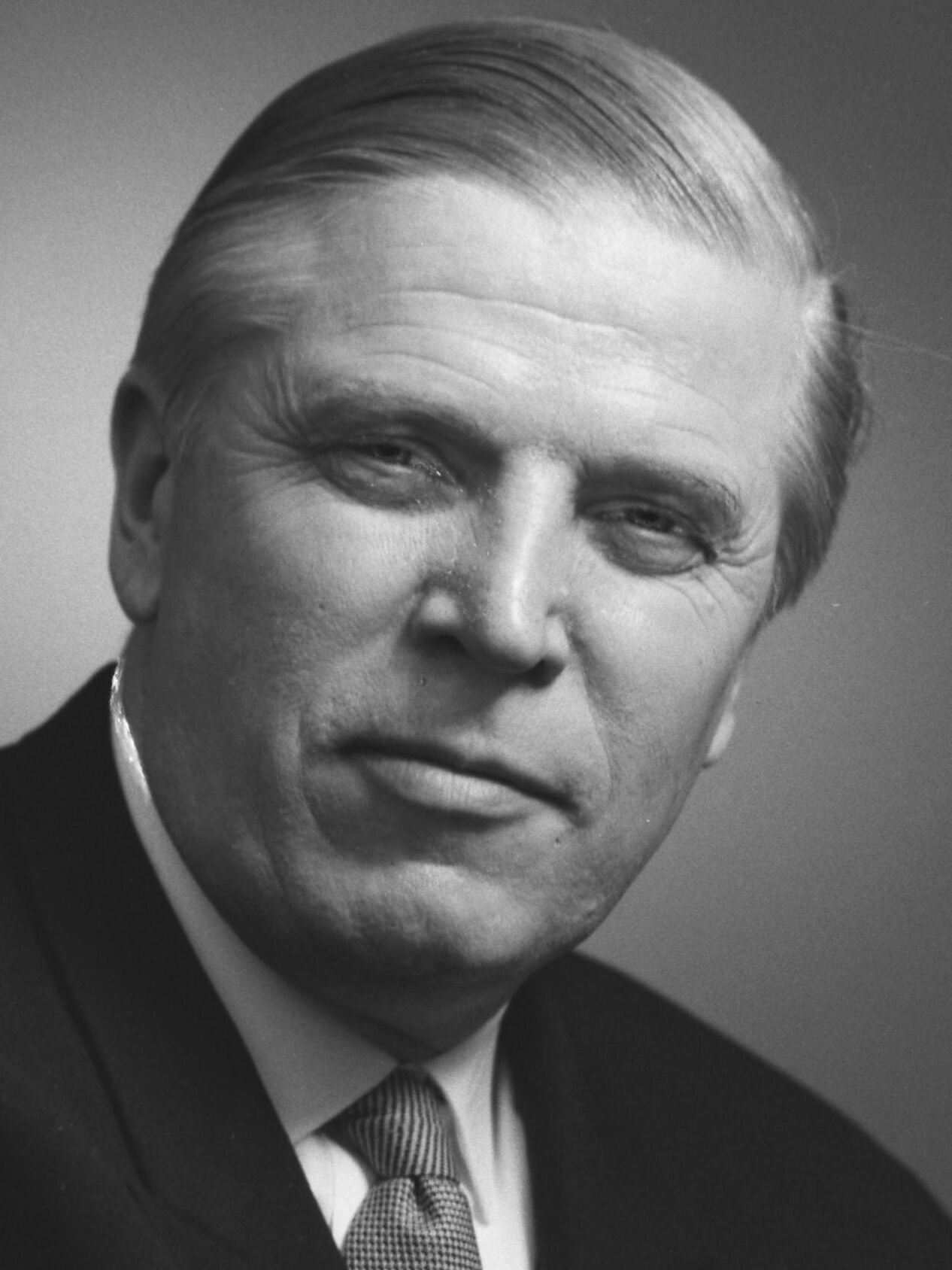

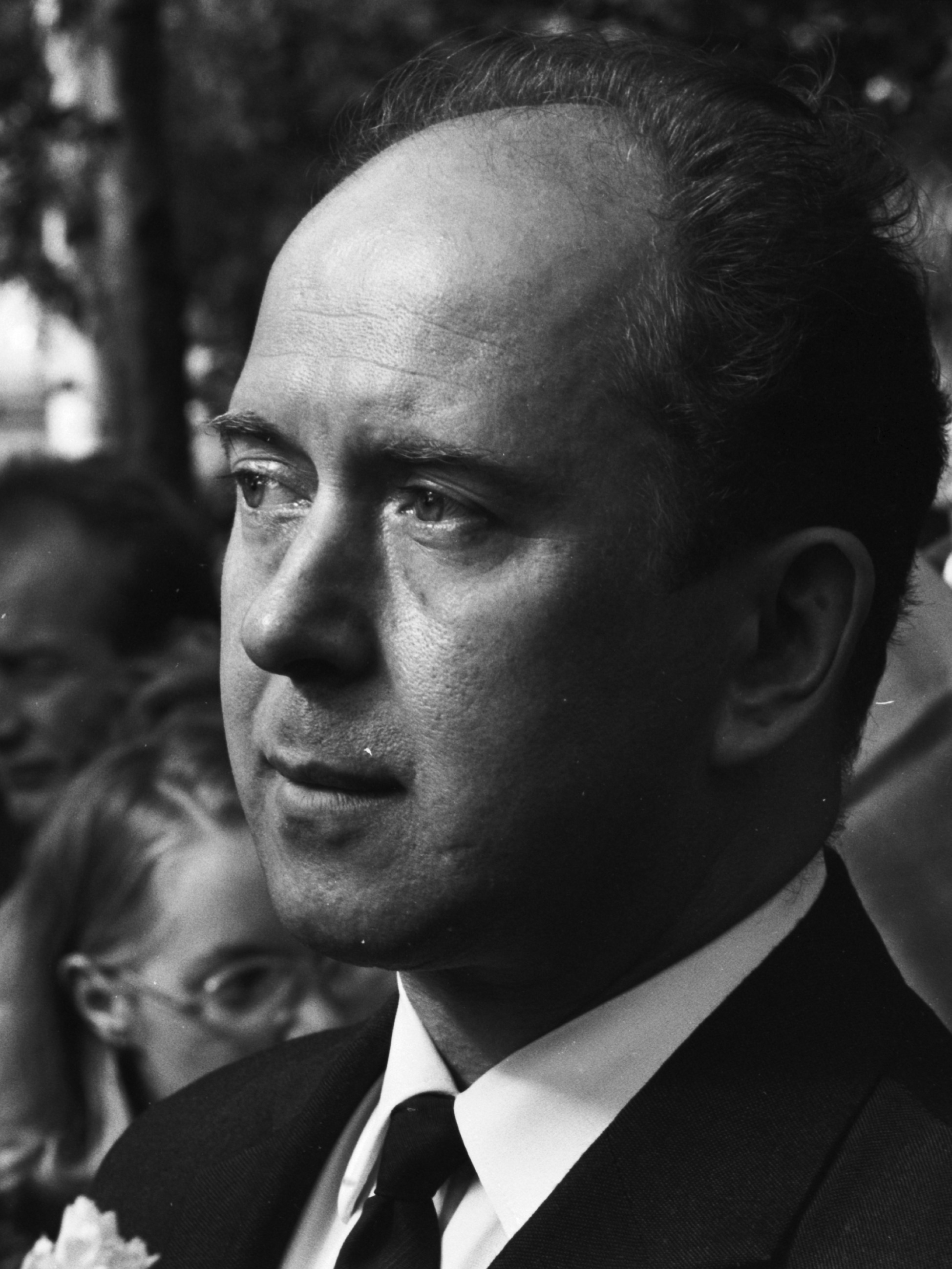

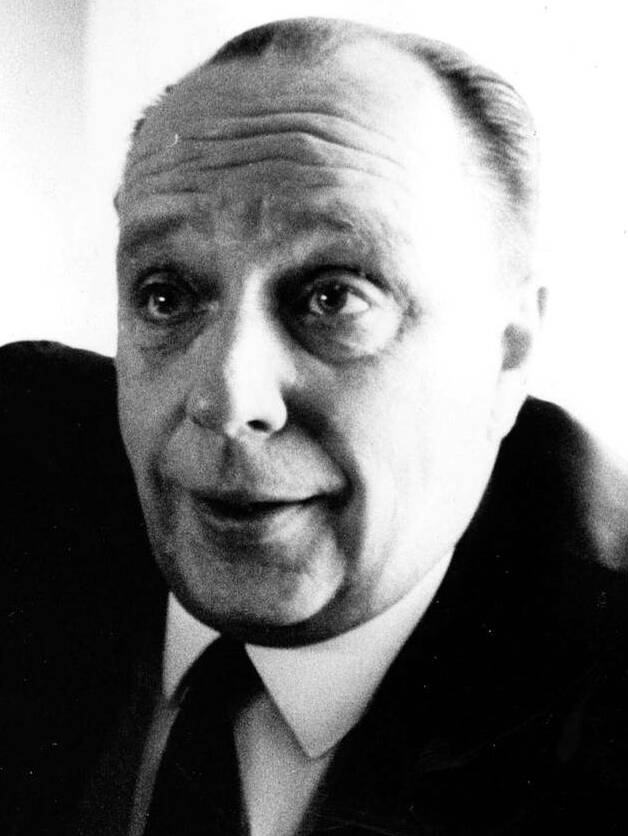

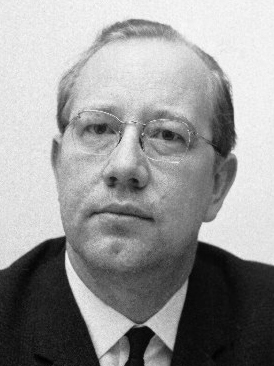

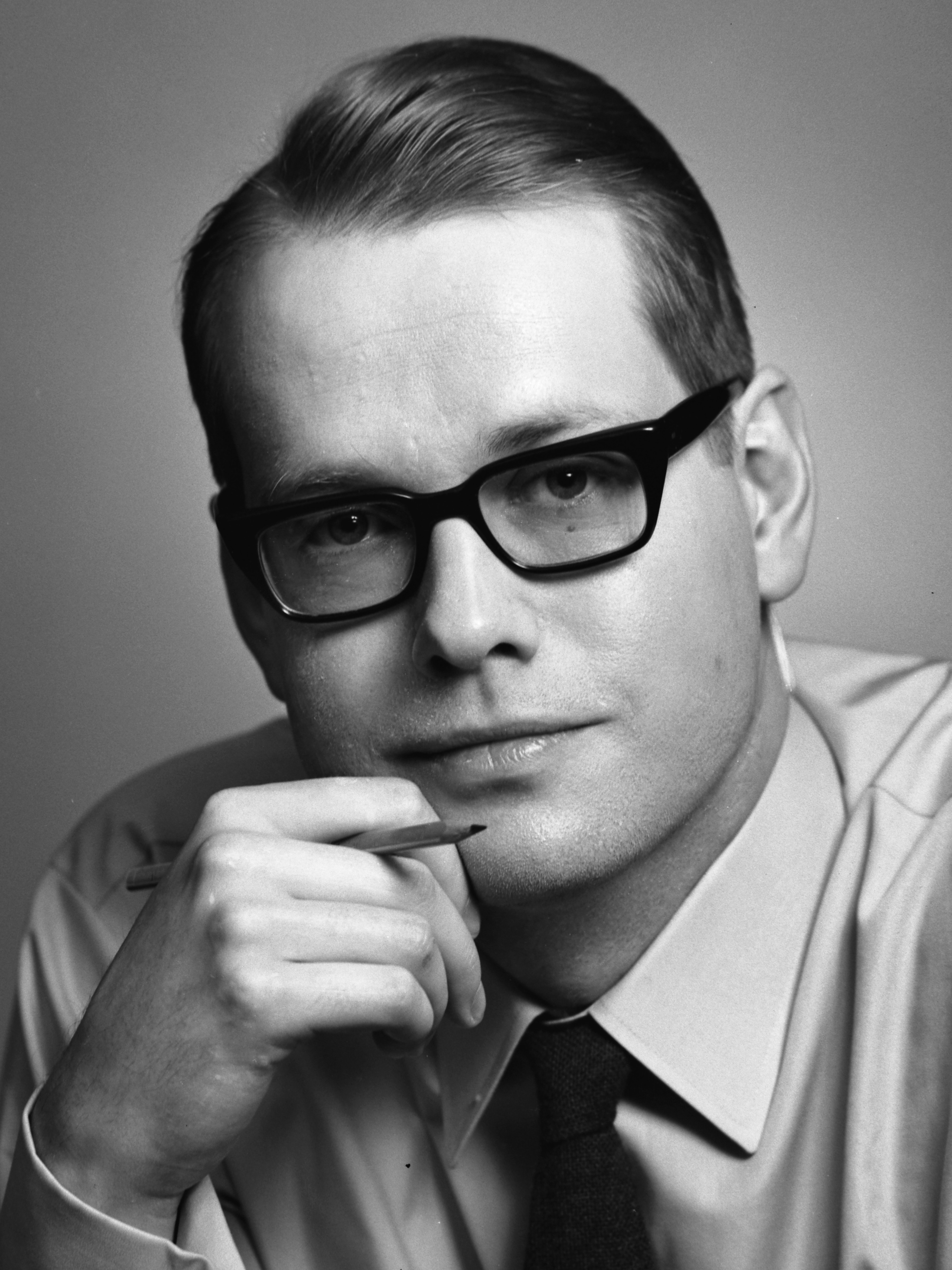

	First party	Second party	Third party
Leader	Rafael Paasio	Juha Rihtniemi	Johannes Virolainen
Party	SDP	National Coalition	Centre
Last election	27.23%, 55 seats	13.79%, 26 seats	21.23%, 49 seats
Seats won	52	37	36
Seat change	▼3	▲11	▼13
Popular vote	594,185	457,582	434,150
Percentage	23.43%	18.05%	17.12%
Swing	▼3.80pp	▲4.26pp	▼4.11pp
	Fourth party	Fifth party	Sixth party
Leader	Ele Alenius	Veikko Vennamo	Jan-Magnus Jansson
Party	SKDL	Rural Party	RKP
Last election	21.20%, 41 seats	1.03%, 1 seat	5.69%, 11 seats
Seats won	36	18	11
Seat change	▼5	▲17	Steady
Popular vote	420,556	265,939	135,465
Percentage	16.58%	10.49%	5.34%
Swing	▼4.62pp	▲9.46pp	▼0.39pp
	Seventh party	Eighth party	Ninth party
Leader	Pekka Tarjanne	Eino Sares
Party	Liberal People's	Christian League	ÅS
Last election	6.47%, 9 seats	0.45%, 0 seats	0.30%, 1 seat
Seats won	8	1	1
Seat change	▼1	▲1	Steady
Popular vote	150,823	28,547	8,971
Percentage	5.95%	1.13%	0.35%
Swing	▼0.52pp	▲0.68pp	▲0.05pp
Prime Minister before election
Mauno Koivisto
SDP
Prime Minister after election
Teuvo Aura
Independent

Parliamentary elections were held in Finland on 15 and 16 March 1970.

== Background ==
Mauno Koivisto had replaced Rafael Paasio as leader of the Social Democratic Party and Prime Minister in March 1968. His government was very broad-based, including the Social Democrats, the Centre Party, the Finnish People's Democratic League, the Swedish People's Party and the Social Democratic Union of Workers and Smallholders, with over four-fifths of MPs belonging to the governing parties. Koivisto's government implemented some liberal reforms, including the sale of medium-strength beer in grocery stores and kiosks, and elective abortion (allowed also for social reasons, in addition to medical ones). The government helped the Finnish economy to grow by pursuing its predecessor's policies of subsidising export companies and fixed-term public works or government-funded jobs.

Centralized incomes agreements between the employers' organizations, labour unions and government became a part of the Finnish "consensus" (broad agreement) politics. On the other hand, quickly proceeding urbanization and industrialization caused many young people and young adults to leave from the countryside, and tens of thousands of Finns moved to Sweden in pursuit of a higher standard of living. Smallholders were severely affected, particularly in eastern and northern Finland. The populist Finnish Rural Party benefited from this discontent, and its charismatic leader, former Assistant Finance Minister and presidential candidate Veikko Vennamo accused the "old parties" of deliberately worsening the farmers' living standards, emptying the countryside and appeasing the Soviet Union too much by, for example, discouraging its open criticism in the Finnish political debate and media.

The increasing mocking and criticism of Christianity, traditional family values, patriotism, army and military service, and parents' and teachers' authority also helped the Rural Party and the National Coalition Party to score big gains in the elections. The opposition parties were irritated by the student radicals' "conquest" of the Old University Students' House in Helsinki in November 1968. Koivisto's government suffered heavy losses, totalling over 20 MPs, but it still had a majority. President Urho Kekkonen allowed the National Coalition Party's leader Juha Rihtniemi to try to form a new government. He was unable to form a majority government, and Kekkonen refused to allow him to form a minority centre-right government, claiming that such a government would fail in foreign policy (in other words, it would not gain the Soviet Union's trust). From May to July 1970, the Liberal city manager of Helsinki, Teuvo Aura, led a caretaker government. Long-time Foreign Minister Ahti Karjalainen managed to form a new centre-left majority government in July 1970, which excluded the National Coalition Party and Rural Party from power. One notable demographic change of these parliamentary elections was the election of several young (under 30-year-old) MPs reflecting the rising political activity of young Finns (the baby boomers), and the lowering of minimum voting age to 20 years.

== Results ==
Party	Votes	%	Seats	+/–
Social Democratic Party	594,185	23.43	52	–3
National Coalition Party	457,582	18.05	37	+11
Centre Party	434,150	17.12	36	–13
Finnish People's Democratic League	420,556	16.58	36	–5
Finnish Rural Party	265,939	10.49	18	+17
Liberal People's Party	150,823	5.95	8	–1
Swedish People's Party	135,465	5.34	11	0
Social Democratic Union of Workers and Smallholders	35,453	1.40	0	–7
Finnish Christian League	28,547	1.13	1	+1
Åland Coalition	8,971	0.35	1	0
Entrepreneur Party	248	0.01	0	New
Others	3,863	0.15	0	–
Total	2,535,782	100.00	200	0
Valid votes	2,535,782	99.66		
Invalid/blank votes	8,728	0.34		
Total votes	2,544,510	100.00		
Registered voters/turnout	3,094,359	82.23		
Source: Tilastokeskus 2004, Suomen virallinen tilasto

=== By electoral district ===
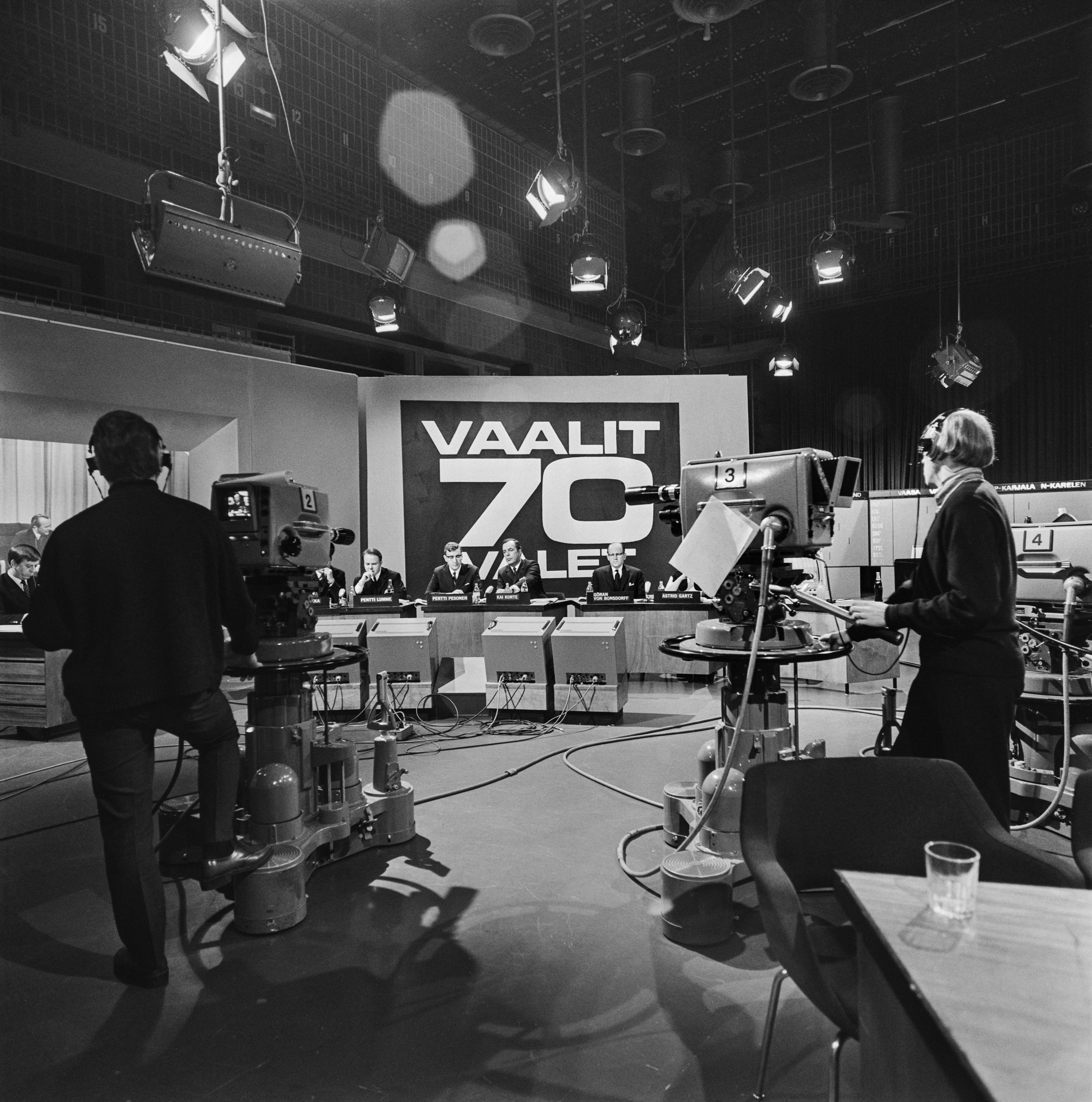
Finland's 1970 parliamentary election results service

Electoral district	Total seats	Seats won								
Electoral district	Total seats	SDP	Kok	Kesk	SKDL	SMP	RKP	LKP	SKL	ÅS
Åland	1									1
Central Finland	11	3	2	3	2	1				
Häme	14	5	4	2	2	1				
Helsinki	22	6	7		4		3	2		
Kymi	15	6	3	2	1	1		1	1	
Lapland	9	1	1	3	3	1				
North Karelia	8	2	1	2	1	2				
North Savo	11	2	2	3	2	2				
Oulu	18	2	1	6	5	3		1		
Pirkanmaa	13	4	4	1	3	1				
Satakunta	13	4	2	2	3	1		1		
South Savo	10	3	1	4	1	1				
Uusimaa	20	7	3	2	3	1	3	1		
Vaasa	19	3	3	4	2	2	4	1		
Varsinais-Suomi	16	4	3	2	4	1	1	1		
Total	200	52	37	36	36	18	11	8	1	1
Source: Statistics Finland
