= Kyösti Lallukka =

Finnish politician (1944–2010)

Chairman of the Liberal People's Party
- In office 1984–1990

Personal details
- Born: 22 March 1944 Enso, Finland
- Died: 9 October 2010 (aged 66) Helsinki, Finland
- Party: Liberal People's Party
- Education: University of Tampere

Kyösti Lallukka (22 March 1944 – 9 October 2010) was a Finnish politician who headed Liberal People's Party between 1984 and 1990.

== Biography ==
Lallukka was born in Enso on 22 March 1944. After graduating from Jyväskylä Lyceum he completed his military service and began his undergraduate studies in Tampere in 1965. He was a member of the Liberal People's Party and was elected as a member of the Parliament. He was the leader of the party between 1984 and 1990.

Lallukka obtained a master's degree from the University of Tampere in 1998.

Lallukka died in Helsinki on 9 October 2010.
