= 1987 Finnish parliamentary election =

General election

← 1983	15–16 March 1987	1991 →

All 200 seats in the Parliament of Finland 101 seats needed for a majority
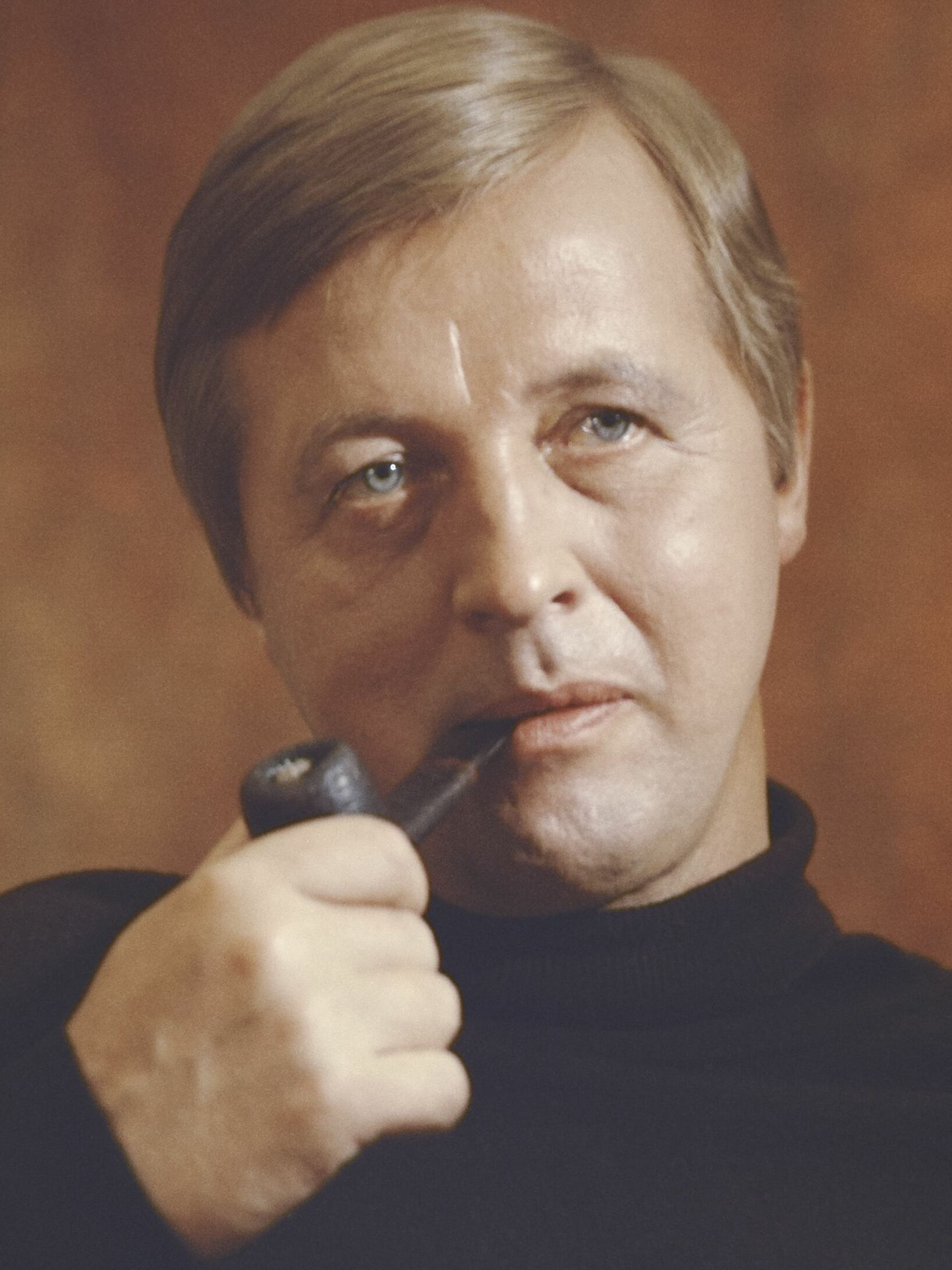

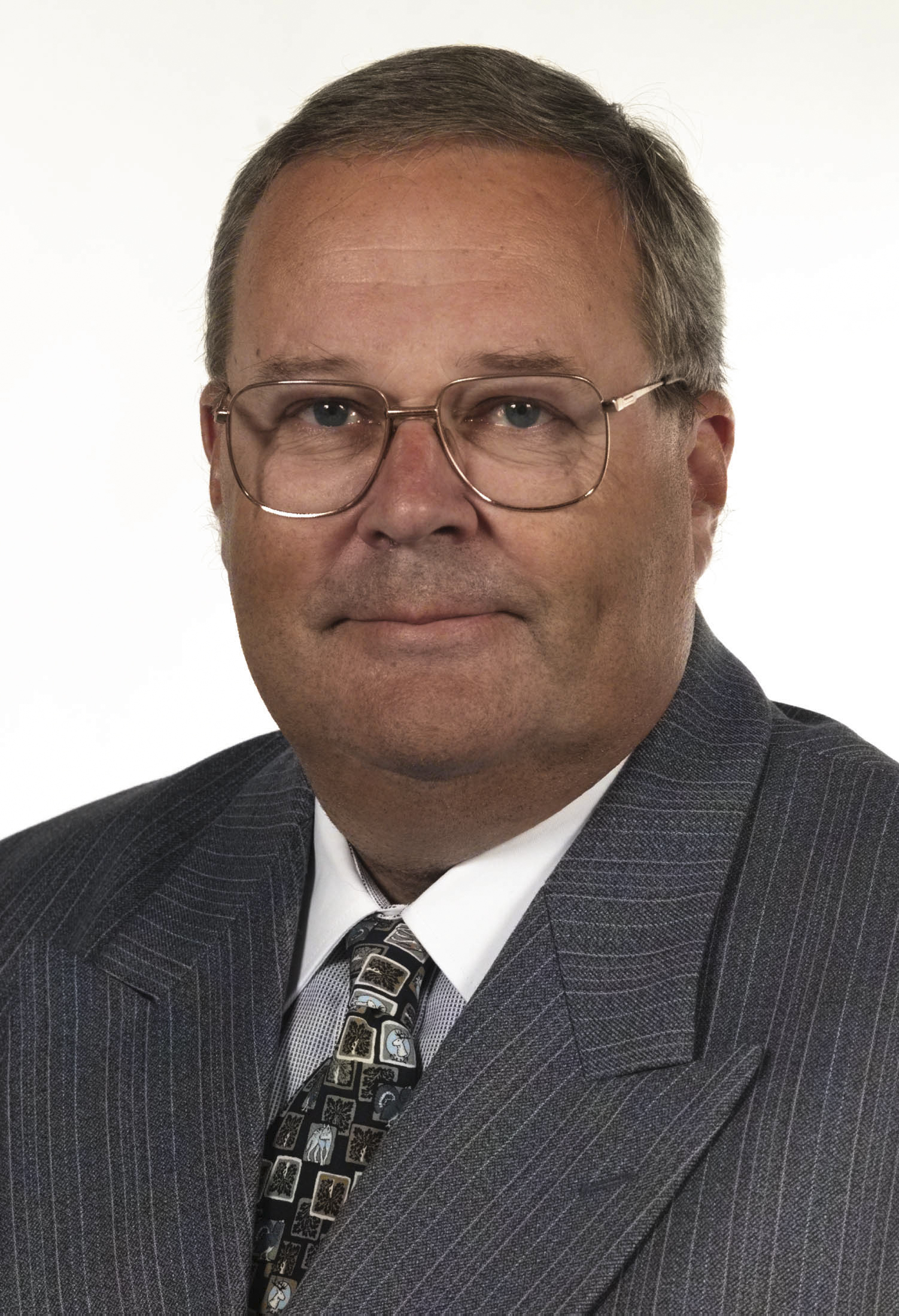

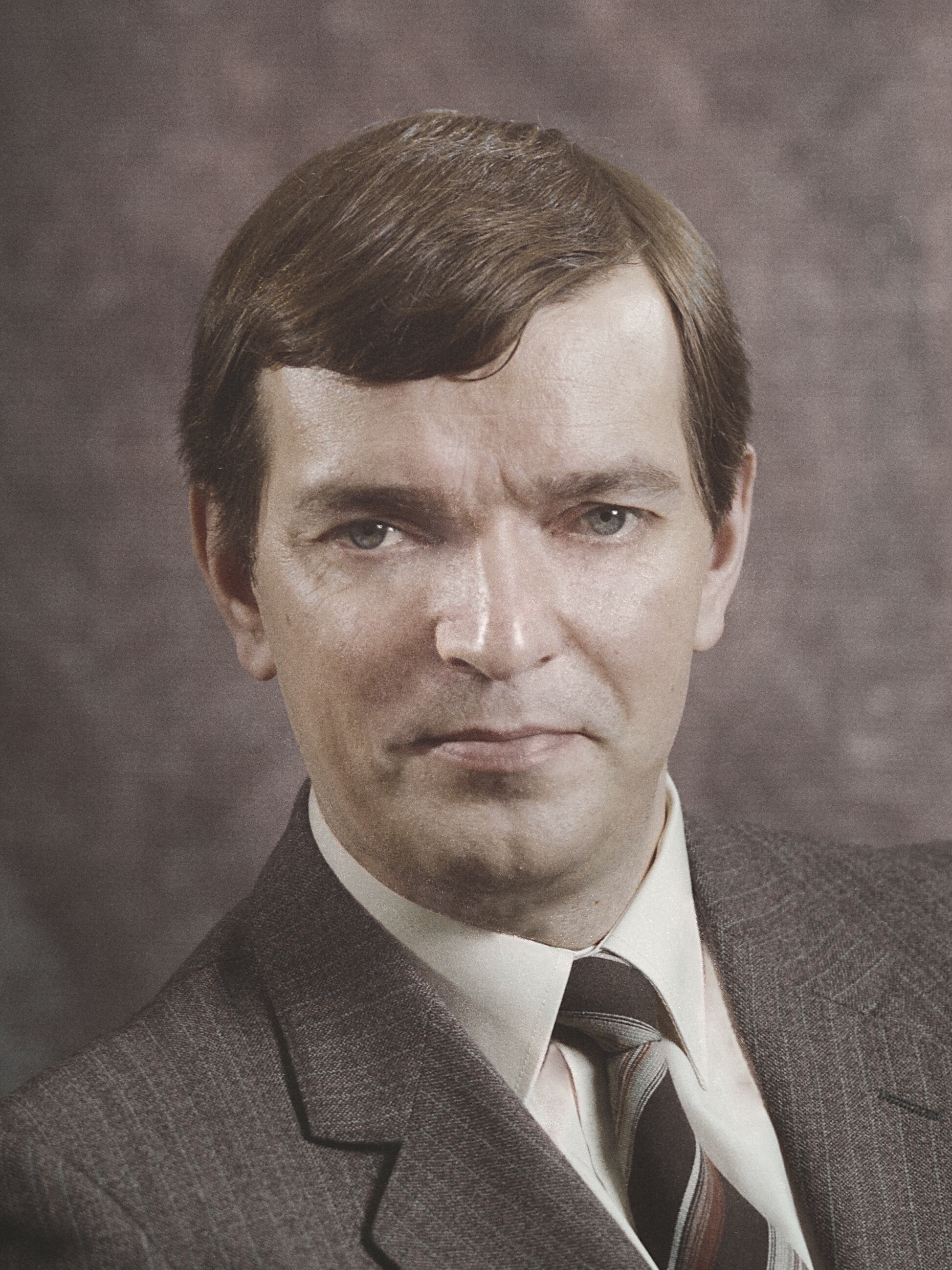

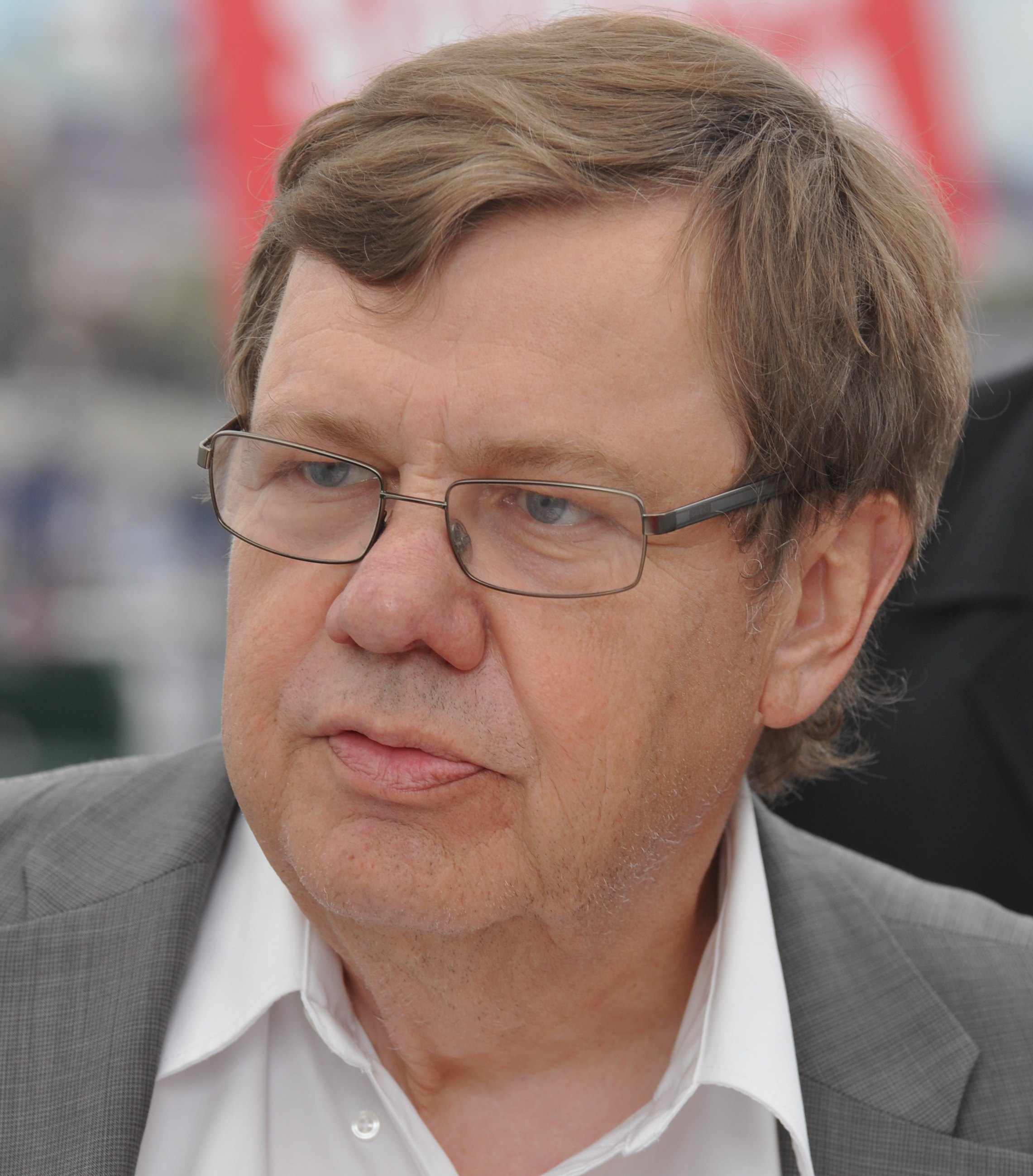

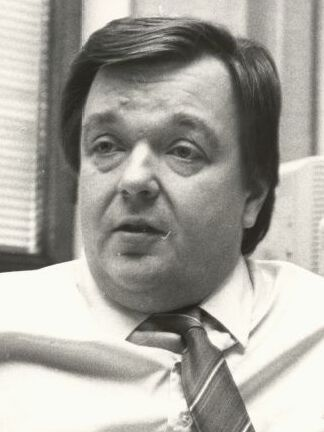

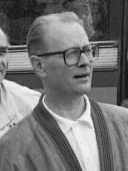

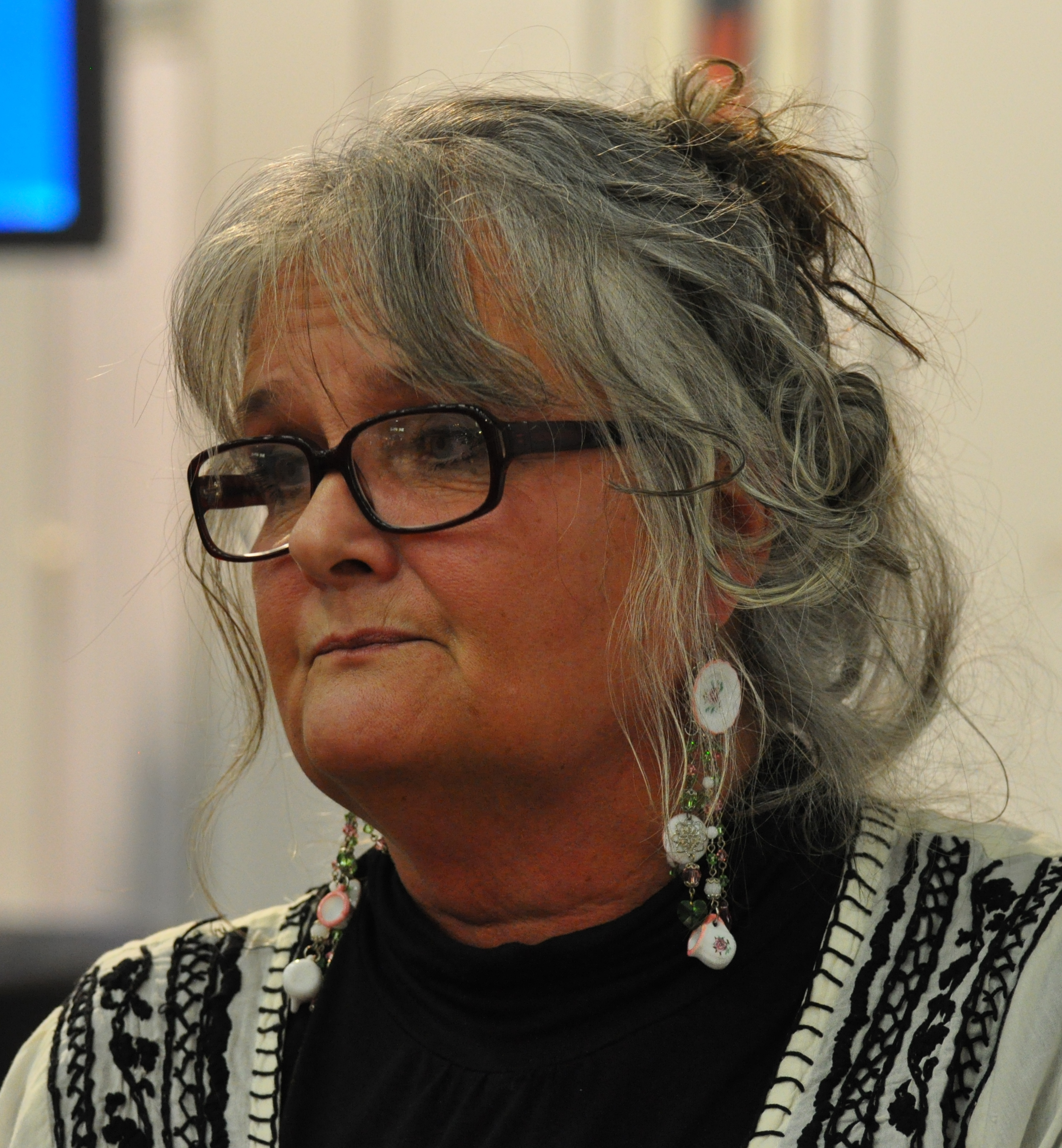

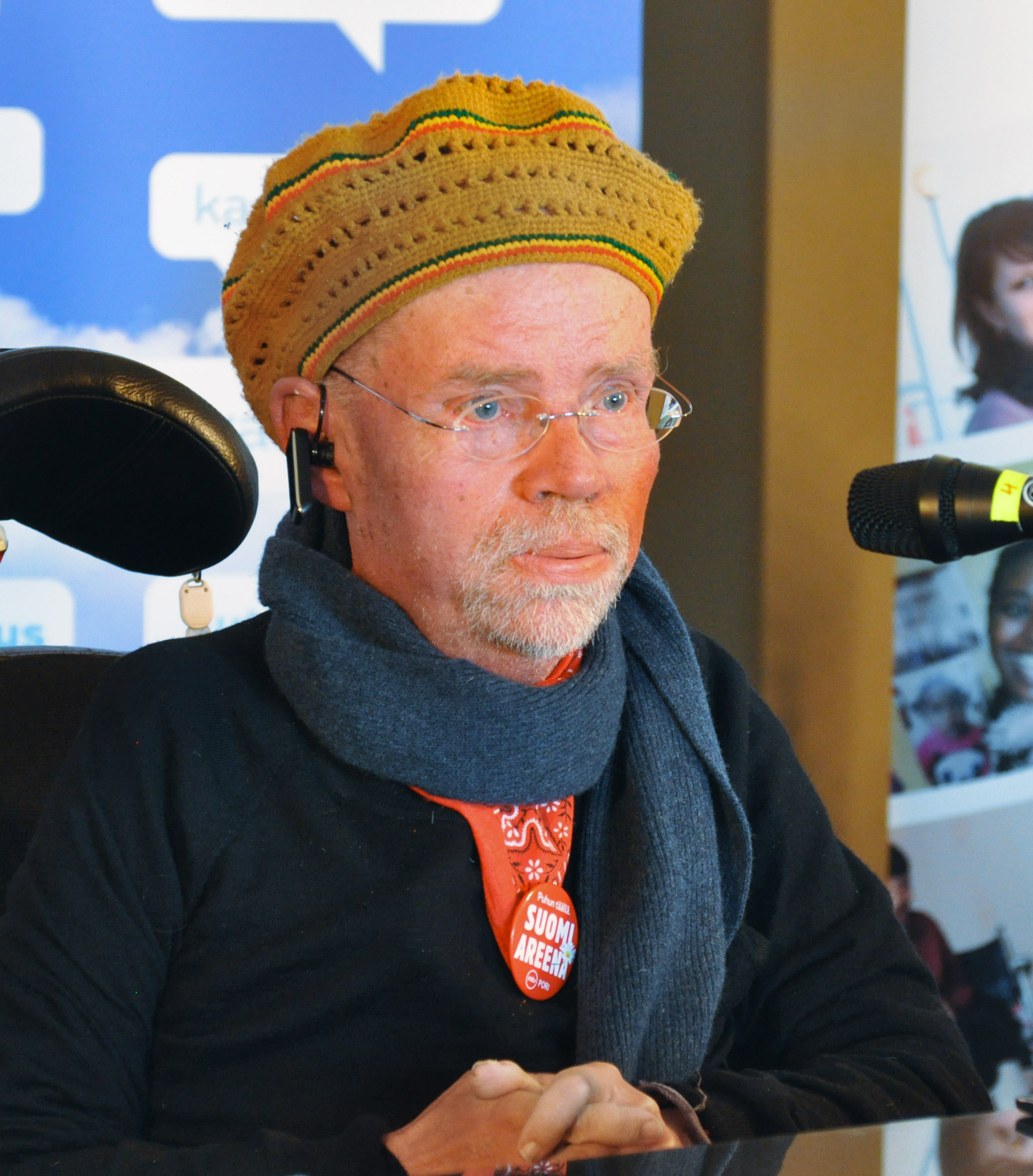
	First party	Second party	Third party
Leader	Kalevi Sorsa	Ilkka Suominen	Paavo Väyrynen
Party	SDP	National Coalition	Centre
Last election	26.71%, 57 seats	22.12%, 44 seats	17.63%, 38 seats
Seats won	56	53	40
Seat change	▼1	▲9	▲2
Popular vote	695,331	666,236	507,460
Percentage	24.14%	23.13%	17.62%
Swing	▼2.57pp	▲1.01pp	▼0.01pp
	Fourth party	Fifth party	Sixth party
Leader	Esko Helle	Christoffer Taxell	Pekka Vennamo
Party	SKDL	RKP	Rural Party
Last election	13.46%, 26 seats	4.61%, 10 seats	9.69%, 17 seats
Seats won	16	12	9
Seat change	▼10	▲2	▼8
Popular vote	270,433	152,597	181,938
Percentage	9.39%	5.30%	6.32%
Swing	▼4.07pp	▲0.69pp	▼3.37pp
	Seventh party	Eighth party	Ninth party
Leader	Esko Almgren	Kristiina Halkola	Kalle Könkkölä
Party	Christian League	Democratic Alternative	Green
Last election	3.03%, 3 seats	–	1.47%, 2 seats
Seats won	5	4	4
Seat change	▲2	New	▲2
Popular vote	74,209	122,181	115,988
Percentage	2.58%	4.24%	4.03%
Swing	▼0.45pp	New	▲2.56pp
Prime Minister before election
Kalevi Sorsa
SDP
Prime Minister after election
Harri Holkeri
National Coalition

Parliamentary elections were held in Finland on 15 and 16 March 1987.

The results saw a rightwards shift in Finnish politics, although it was uncertain how far, because the voter turnout — at a comparatively low 75% — hurt the left more than the right and had a variable impact. The centre-right National Coalition Party (KOK) increased its vote share by only 1% yet gained nine seats in the Eduskunta, almost overtaking the Social Democratic Party (SDP) as the largest party. The SDP vote share dropped by 3%, with 100,000 fewer votes, yet they lost only one seat due to the way their votes were distributed across the country. The Centre Party's vote share remained stable and it gained two new seats. The Greens, who had registered a significant gain in the 1984 municipal elections gained two seats, far fewer than expected. Weakened perhaps from its membership in the long-lived government, the Finnish Rural Party (SMP) lost more than one-third of its support and almost half of its seats.

== Results ==
Party	Votes	%	Seats	+/–
Social Democratic Party	695,331	24.14	56	–1
National Coalition Party	666,236	23.13	53	+9
Centre Party	507,460	17.62	40	+2
Finnish People's Democratic League	270,433	9.39	16	–10
Finnish Rural Party	181,938	6.32	9	–8
Swedish People's Party	152,597	5.30	12	+2
Democratic Alternative	122,181	4.24	4	New
Greens	115,988	4.03	4	+2
Finnish Christian League	74,209	2.58	5	+2
Pensioners' Party	35,100	1.22	0	New
Liberal People's Party	27,824	0.97	0	–
Liberals for Åland–Social Democrats	7,019	0.24	1	0
Constitutional Right Party	3,096	0.11	0	–1
Åland Centre–Freeminded Cooperation	1,843	0.06	0	0
Free Åland	539	0.02	0	0
Others	18,299	0.64	0	–
Total	2,880,093	100.00	200	0
Valid votes	2,880,093	99.47		
Invalid/blank votes	15,395	0.53		
Total votes	2,895,488	100.00		
Registered voters/turnout	4,017,039	72.08		
Source: Tilastokeskus, ASUB

=== By electoral district ===
Electoral district	Total seats	Seats won									
Electoral district	Total seats	SDP	Kok	Kesk	SKDL	RKP	SMP	SKL	DV	Vihr	L–S
Åland	1										1
Central Finland	10	3	2	2	1		1	1			
Häme	15	6	6	2	1						
Helsinki	20	6	7		1	3		1		2	
Kymi	14	6	4	2			1	1			
Lapland	8	1	1	4	1				1		
North Karelia	7	3	1	3							
North Savo	10	2	2	4	1		1				
Oulu	18	2	3	8	3		1			1	
Pirkanmaa	13	4	5	1	1		1		1		
Satakunta	12	4	3	2	2		1				
South Savo	8	3	2	3							
Uusimaa	29	9	9	2	2	4	1		1	1	
Vaasa	18	3	3	5	1	4	1	1			
Varsinais-Suomi	17	4	5	2	2	1	1	1	1		
Total	200	56	53	40	16	12	9	5	4	4	1
Source: Statistics Finland

== Aftermath ==
Faced with these inconclusive results, negotiations about the shape of the new government began. After six weeks of talks and attempts to put together a completely non-socialist government, a pathbreaking combination was formed that included conservatives and socialists in the Council of State, joined by the dependable and successful Swedish People's Party and the battered and desperate SMP.

The new government, consisting of nine centrist and conservative and eight socialist ministers and headed by the KOK's Harri Holkeri, surprised some observers because a non-socialist government was possible and seemed appropriate given the election results. The outcome angered others, who contended that Koivisto had misused presidential powers when he brokered a government that had his former party as a member despite its considerable electoral losses. Koivisto countered that he had behaved properly and had let the parties themselves argue out a workable combination.

One explanation for the unusual government was that animosity against the Centre Party (Kesk) leader, Paavo Väyrynen, was so common in both the SDP and the KOK that neither party was willing to form a government with him. Thus, Kesk was deprived of its traditional "hinge" role. Another consideration was that the SDP and the KOK were not so much at odds with each another as socialist and conservative parties elsewhere might have been. Both parties had moved toward the centre, and they were in agreement about most issues, especially about the need to reduce the agricultural subsidies that had always been defended by Kesk. The resulting "red-blue" government had as program objective the preservation of the social welfare system, the improvement of Finland's competitive position in international trade, a fundamental reform of the tax system, and adherence to the Paasikivi-Kekkonen Line in foreign affairs. The SFP fitted in easily with this program. The formerly rightist, but now moderate, SMP was included because it strengthened the government slightly and because it was likely to be dependable, because it had no other place to go. Koivisto informed the new government that it would not have to resign after the presidential election of 1988, and observers expected the cabinet to serve its full term until the 1991 parliamentary elections.
