= Rainer Lemström =

Finnish politician

Kaarlo Rainer Lemström (23 August 1931, Loppi - 18 May 2007) was a Finnish politician. He was a member of the Parliament of Finland from 1972 to 1975, representing the Finnish Rural Party (SMP). He was the party secretary of the SMP from 1970 to 1972 and again from 1977 to 1979.
