= Pekka Vennamo =

Finnish politician and corporate executive (1944–2026)

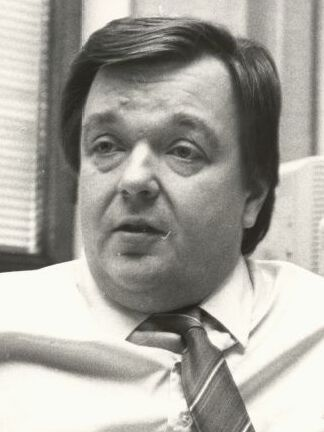

Pekka Veikko Vennamo (7 November 1944 – 9 February 2026) was a Finnish politician and corporate executive. He was the leader of the Finnish Rural Party from 1979 to 1989. He was also a member of the Parliament of Finland from 1972 to 1975 representing the constituency of Helsinki and again from 1979 to 1989 representing the southern constituency of Turku Province. In addition, Vennamo served as the Deputy Minister of Finance in Kalevi Sorsa's fourth cabinet from 1983 to 1987 and as the Minister of Transport in Harri Holkeri's cabinet from 1987 to 1989.

== Life and career ==
Vennamo was born in Helsinki on 7 November 1944, the son of Veikko Vennamo, the founder and first leader of the Finnish Rural party. Before entering politics, he studied engineering. As the party leader, Vennamo led the Finnish Rural Party to a great victory at the 1983 parliamentary election after which the party entered the government for the first time. Vennamo left politics in 1989 when he was appointed director (later CEO) of Post and Telecommunications. He angered his previous supporters in the rural areas of the country – many typical Finnish Rural Party voters – when in an effort to improve the efficiency of the postal service he ordered the closure of numerous rural post offices. When the company was split to Finland Post and Sonera in 1998, he was appointed CEO of Sonera. However, in January 1999 Vennamo was removed from office because of his controversial dealings with company shares. Beginning in 1999, Vennamo was CEO of a company called Sijoitus.

Vennamo died of complications from surgery on 9 February 2026, at the age of 81.
