= 1992 Finnish municipal elections =

Municipal elections were held in Finland on 18 October 1992.

== National results ==
Party	Votes	%	Seats	+/–
Social Democratic Party	721,310	27.08	3,130	+264
Centre Party	511,954	19.22	3,998	–229
National Coalition Party	507,574	19.05	2,009	–383
Left Alliance	310,757	11.67	1,319	+110
Green League	184,787	6.94	343	+249
Swedish People's Party	133,633	5.02	664	–48
Finnish Christian League	84,481	3.17	353	+80
Finnish Rural Party	64,880	2.44	354	–99
Liberal People's Party	26,334	0.99	49	–13
Seniors' Party	4,903	0.18	5	New
Communist Workers' Party – For Peace and Socialism	4,828	0.18	1	New
Pensioners' Party	2,679	0.10	2	–3
Women's Party	1,994	0.07	0	New
Humanity Party	732	0.03	0	New
The Greens	677	0.03	3	+1
Others	102,332	3.84	341	–78
Total	2,663,855	100.00	12,571	–271
Source: Tilastokeskus
