= Finnish Rural Party =

Former Finnish political party

Finnish Rural Party Suomen Maaseudun Puolue
- Founded: 1959
- Dissolved: 1995 (de facto); 2003 (de jure)
- Split from: Agrarian League
- Succeeded by: Finns Party (de facto)
- Headquarters: Helsinki
- Ideology: Agrarianism; Populism; Anti-Sovietism
- Political position: Syncretic

The Finnish Rural Party (Finnish: Suomen maaseudun puolue, SMP; Swedish: Finlands landsbygdsparti, FLP) was an agrarian and populist political party in Finland. Starting as a breakaway faction of the Agrarian League in 1959 as the Small Peasants' Party of Finland (Suomen Pientalonpoikien Puolue), the party was identified with the person of Veikko Vennamo, a former Agrarian League Member of Parliament known for his opposition to the politics of President Urho Kekkonen. Vennamo was chairman of the Finnish Rural Party between 1959 and 1979.

Support for the party was at its highest in the 1970s and 1980s, with its share of the votes reaching around 10 percent in some parliamentary elections. Between 1983 and 1990, the party took part in two coalition governments. In the 1990s, the party fell into financial trouble and was disbanded in 1995; it was formally dissolved in 2003. It was succeeded by the Finns Party.

== History ==
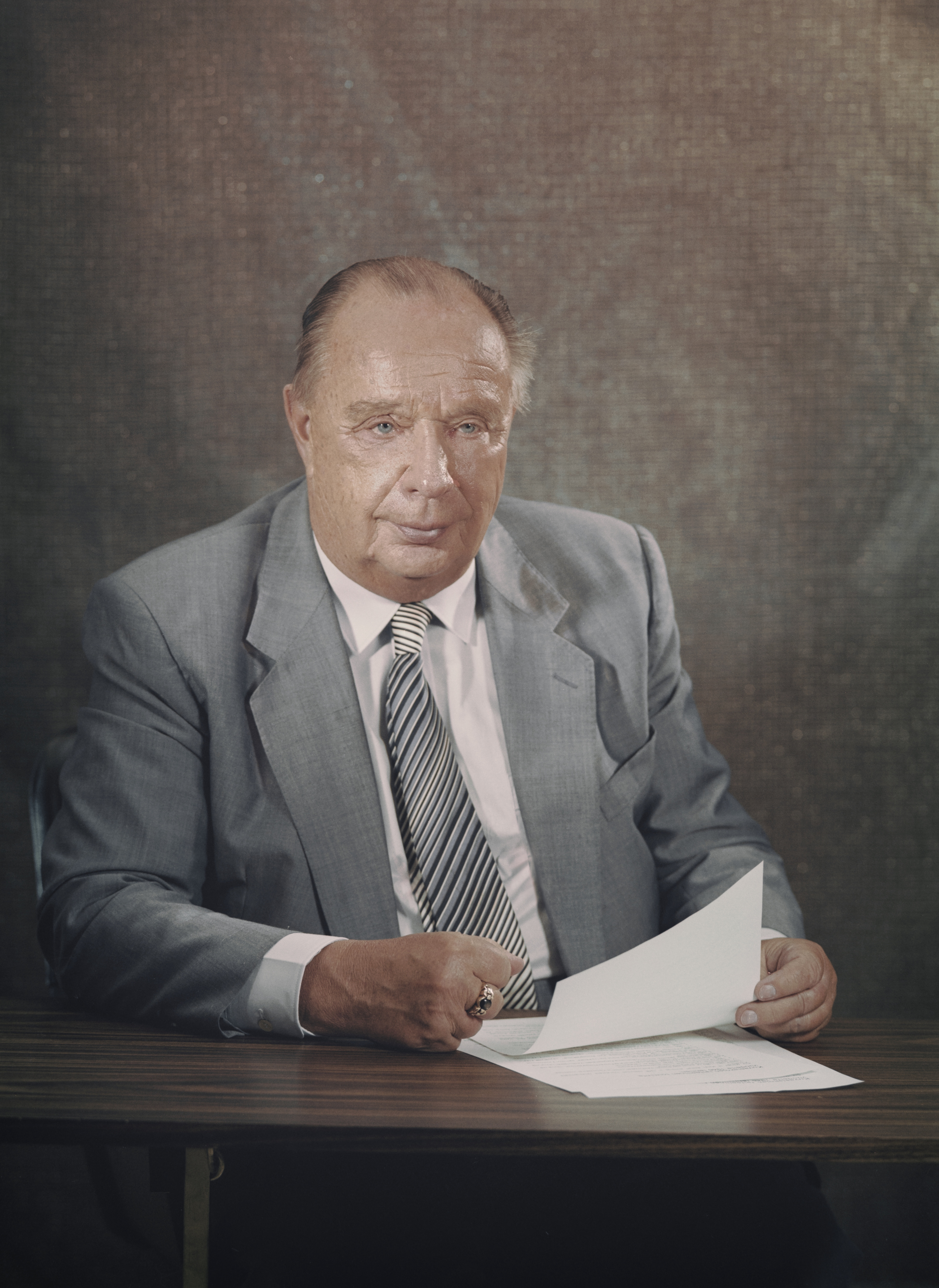
Veikko Vennamo

The founder of the Finnish Rural Party was Veikko Vennamo, leader of a faction in the Agrarian League (which was renamed Centre Party in 1965). Vennamo resided as the head of The Department of Housing and Land Reform with relations to the Karelian refugees after the Continuation War. His schism with his own party had started when V. J. Sukselainen was elected the chairman of the Agrarian League. The relations between Vennamo and the Agrarian League's strong man Urho Kekkonen were icy at best, and after Kekkonen was elected president in 1956 Vennamo ran into serious disagreement with the party secretary, Arvo Korsimo, and was excluded from the parliamentary group. As a result, he immediately founded his own party in 1959.

=== Small Peasants' Party of Finland ===
In December 1957, Mr. Paavo Ojalehto from Northern Finland wrote a letter to the board of the members of the Agrarian League claiming, that the party secretary of the Agrarian League, Arvo Korsimo, did not meet the traditional moral values and did not appreciate chastity. The only member supporting Ojalehto's claim was Vennamo. Vennamo was not allowed to take part in party the parliamentary group of the Agrarian League in the parliament of Finland for a set period of time in 1958. Small Peasants' Party of Finland (Suomen Pientalonpoikien Puolue) was registered in the end of 1958. The only MP of the party was Vennamo. The founders of the party were members of the Agrarian League.

As Johannes Virolainen succeeded Sukselainen as the chairman of the Agrarian League and had the name of the Agrarian League changed to Center Party (Keskustapuolue) in 1965 to meet better the needs of the sons and daughters of the farmers, who sought work in the cities, towns and boroughs as an alternative to the emigration to Sweden. The Small Peasants Party of Finland emphasized its position of defending the small peasants agriculture on its behalf.

In 1966, the party was renamed The Rural Party of Finland.

=== Finnish Rural Party ===
The Finnish Rural Party started as a protest movement, with support from the unemployed and small farmers. The state-sponsored resettlement of veterans of World War II and evacuees from ceded Karelia into independent small farms provided an independent power base to Vennamo, who was nationally well known, having served as director of the government resettlement agency since the end of the war. Vennamo was the honorary chairman of Asutusliitto, the resettler society, and the society was involved in early campaigning. For the newly founded party, the main carrying force was Vennamo, who was charismatic, a good orator and a skilled negotiator.

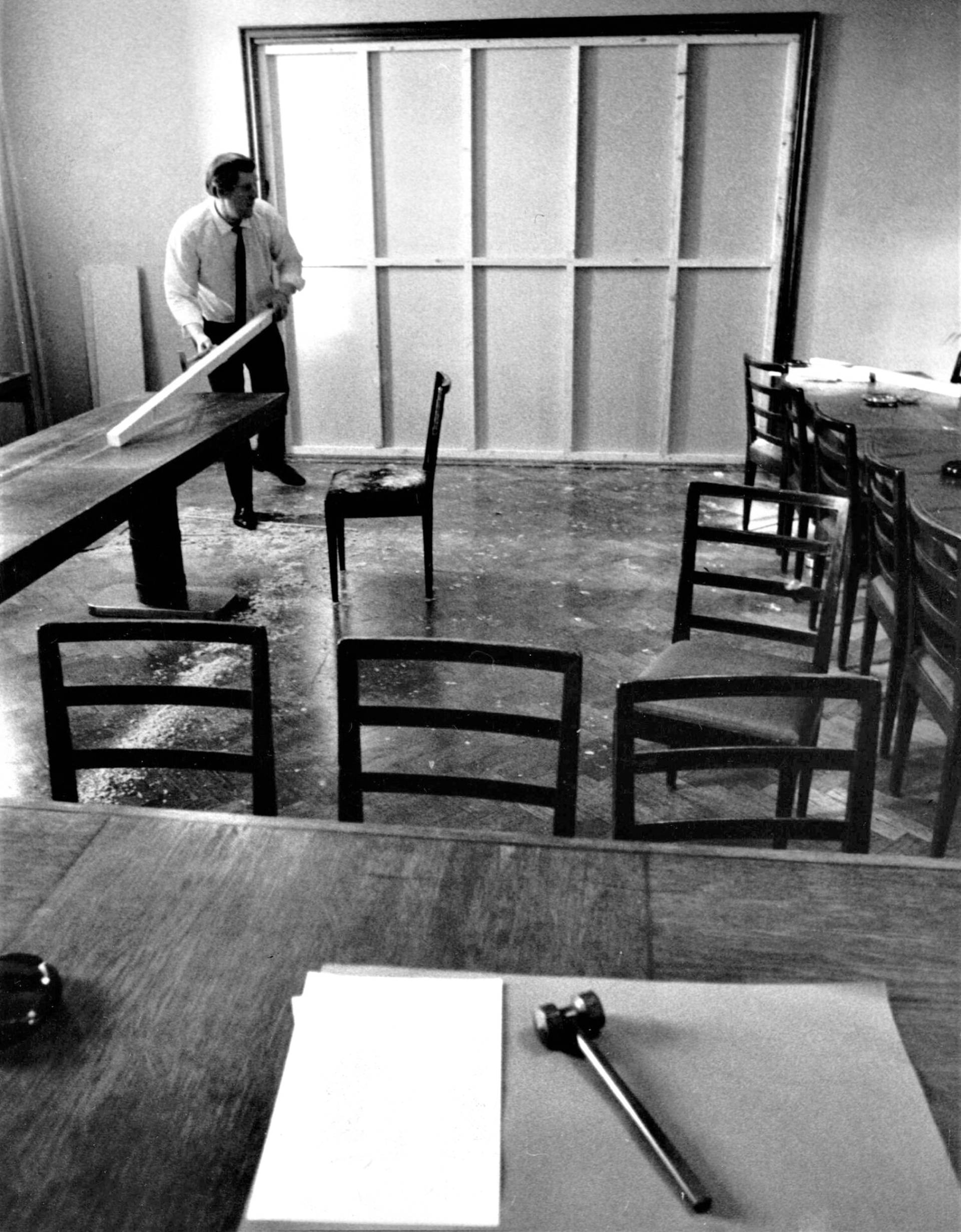
When the party was split in 1972, the group room of the party in the Parliamentary building was also temporarily divided.

The Rural Party won in its best showing with 18 seats in the Finnish parliament (which has 200 seats) in the 1970 election. The party got exactly the same amount of MPs in the next election in 1972, but was soon afterwards split in two as a majority of the parliamentary group, 12 members, resigned to establish a new party called the Finnish People's Unity Party (Suomen Kansan Yhtenäisyyden Puolue, SKYP). The party defectors accused Vennamo of autocratic leadership, while Vennamo accused the defectors of having been bought off with parliamentary party subsidies.

Veikko Vennamo's son, Pekka Vennamo, became the party leader when his father retired in the 1980s. Vennamo Junior had neither the charisma nor the oratorical skills of his father. Other parties noticed this, and the Rural Party was taken into the cabinet in 1983. As a protest movement without a charismatic leader, burdened with ministers participating in unpopular coalitions, the party gradually lost political support.

Agricultural changes proved hard for small farmers, who sold their farms and moved to the cities. The Social Democratic Party was seen as a more credible alternative for the unemployed. Finally, the declining support of the Rural Party forced Vennamo Junior to resign. Some of the party's former MPs joined the Centre Party or retired with Vennamo. The party's last chairman and MP Raimo Vistbacka (the only one elected in 1995) was among the founders of the Finns Party and became that party's first MP and chairman. The Rural Party's last party secretary Timo Soini likewise became the Finns Party's first party secretary. With the Finns Party's electoral success in the 2011 election three former Rural Party MPs returned to the parliament as Finns Party MPs (Anssi Joutsenlahti, Lea Mäkipää, Pentti Kettunen).

It declared bankruptcy in 2003. Four supporters of the Rural Party of Finland, including Timo Soini and Raimo Vistbacka, established the Finns Party. The decision to establish this new party was made in a sauna in the village of Kalmari in the town of Saarijärvi.

== Ideology ==
The party held anti-establishment or anti-elite views, and criticized other politicians and parties, the government, "bureaucrats", international corporations, academics, cultural elites and corruption, while idealizing the ordinary people and small-time entrepreneurs of the countryside. Vennamo attacked, for example, other members of the parliament for over-claiming daily allowances. The party was also anti-communist, and claimed established parties and the political leadership were too subservient to the Soviet Union.

Vennamo was known for inventing and using pejorative terms, such as rötösherrat, referring to allegedly corrupt politicians, and teoriaherrat, referring to academics allegedly lacking common sense. A slogan used by the party was Kyllä kansa tietää! ("The people do know!").

The party professed to hold traditional Christian values, and, for example, opposed the decriminalization of homosexuality in 1971. Racism and xenophobia were not visibly part of the party's ideology.

== Prominent Ruralists ==
=== Chairmen ===
- Veikko Vennamo (1959–1979)
- Pekka Vennamo (1979–1989)
- Heikki Riihijärvi (1989–1991)
- Tina Mäkelä (1991–1992)
- Raimo Vistbacka (1992–1995)

=== Party Secretaries ===
- Köpi Luoma 1959–1960
- Eino Poutiainen 1961–1970
- Rainer Lemström 1970–1972 ja 1977–1979
- Urpo Leppänen 1972–1977 ja 1979–1984
- Aaro Niiranen 1984−1989
- Tina Mäkelä 1989–1991
- Reijo Rinne 1991−1992
- Timo Soini 1992–1995

=== Deputy Chairpersons ===
- Tauno Lääperi 1959–?
- Aarne Jokela 1959–?
- Rainer Lemström 1. 1976–1977
- Aune Rutonen 2. 1976–1982
- Eino Poutiainen 1977–1979
- Niilo Salpakari 1980–1982
- Leo Lassila 1982–1983
- Helvi Koskinen 1982–1985
- Kalle Palosaari 1. 1983–1988
- Lea Mäkipää 2. 1985–
- Timo Soini 1. 1991–1992
- Toivo Satomaa 2. 1991–
- Marja-Leena Leppänen
- Jouko Kröger

=== Chairpersons of the parliamentary group ===
- J. Juhani Kortesalmi (1979–1983, 1986–1987)
- Veikko Vennamo (1983–1986)
- Heikki Riihijärvi (1987)
- Urpo Leppänen (1987–1988)
- Sulo Aittoniemi (1988–1994)
- Lea Mäkipää (1994–1995)
- Raimo Vistbacka (1995)

=== Party Congresses ===
- Perustava kokous (founding congress) 9.2.1959 Pieksämäki
- 1. puoluekokous (party congress) 29.–30.1959 Kiuruvesi
- 2. puoluekokous 3.–4.9.1960 Joensuu
- 3. puoluekokous 4.–5.8.1961 Jyväskylä
- 4. puoluekokous 16.–17.6.1962 Pieksämäki
- 5. puoluekokous 15.–16.6.1963 Seinäjoki
- 6. puoluekokous 13.–14.6.1964 Kuopio
- 7. puoluekokous 12.–13.6.1965 Oulu
- 8. puoluekokous 13.–14.8.1966 Tampere
- ylimääräinen puoluekokous (extraordinary party congress) 29.10.1966 Helsinki
- 9. puoluekokous 5.–6.8.1967 Helsinki
- 10. puoluekokous 3.–4.8.1968 Kajaani
- 11. puoluekokous 16.–17.8.1969 Pori
- 12. puoluekokous ?.8.1970 Lahti
- 13. puoluekokous 7.–8.8.1971 Oulu
- 14. puoluekokous 12.8.1972 Kouvola
- 15. puoluekokous 4.–5.8.1973 Mikkeli
- 16. puoluekokous 3.–4.8.1974 Turku
- 17. puoluekokous 1975 Jyväskylä
- 18. puoluekokous 7.–8.8.1976 Joensuu
- 19. puoluekokous 6.–7.8.1977 Oulu
- 20. puoluekokous 5.–6.8.1978 Tampere
- 21. puoluekokous 4.–5.8.1979 Pori
- 22. puoluekokous 1.–3.8.1980 Lahti
- 23. puoluekokous 7.–9.8.1981 Seinäjoki
- 24. puoluekokous 6.–8.8.1982 Lappeenranta
- 25. puoluekokous 5.–7.8.1983 Kuopio
- 26. puoluekokous 3.–5.8.1984 Turku
- 27. puoluekokous 2.–4.8.1985 Hyvinkää
- 28. puoluekokous 8.–10.8.1986 Jyväskylä
- 29. puoluekokous 7.–9.8.1987 Oulu
- 30. puoluekokous 5.–7.8.1988 Lahti
- 33. puoluekokous 4.–5.8.1991 Turku
- 34. puoluekokous 1.8.1993 Mikkeli
- 35. puoluekokous 3.–4.7.1994 Oulu

== Election results ==
=== Parliamentary elections ===
Parliament of Finland
Date	Votes			Seats		Position	Size
Date	No.	%	± pp	No.	±	Position	Size
1962	49,773	2.16	New	0 / 200	New	Extra-parliamentary	8th
1966	24,351	1.03	▼1.13	1 / 200	▲1	Opposition	8th
1970	265,939	10.49	▲9.46	18 / 200	▲17	Opposition	▲5th
1972	236,206	9.16	▼1.33	18 / 200	0	Opposition	5th
1975	98,815	3.59	▼5.57	2 / 200	▼16	Opposition	▼7th
1979	132,457	4.58	▼0.99	7 / 200	▲5	Opposition	▲6th
1983	288,711	9.69	▲5.11	17 / 200	▲10	Coalition (SDP–KESK–RKP–SMP)	▲5th
1987	181,938	6.32	▼3.37	9 / 200	▼8	Coalition (KOK–SDP–RKP–SMP)	5th
1991	132,133	4.85	▼1.47	7 / 200	▼2	Opposition	▼7th
1995	36,185	1.30	▼3.55	1 / 200	▼6	Opposition	▼10th

Local
Year	Vote %	Type
1960	2.7	Municipal
1964	1.4	Municipal
1968	7.3	Municipal
1972	5.0	Municipal
1976	2.1	Municipal
1980	3.0	Municipal
1984	5.3	Municipal
1988	3.6	Municipal
1992	2.4	Municipal

=== Presidential elections ===
Electoral college elections
Year	Candidate	Votes for SMP electors	Share of votes
1968	Veikko Vennamo	231,282	11.4%
1978	Veikko Vennamo	114,488	4.7%
1982	Veikko Vennamo	71,947	2.3%
1988	Mauno Koivisto (SDP candidate, also supported by SMP)	120,043	4.0%
Direct elections
Year	Candidate	Votes	Share of votes
1994	Sulo Aittoniemi	30 622 (first round)	1.0% (first round)
