= Juha Rihtniemi =

Finnish politician (1927–1971)

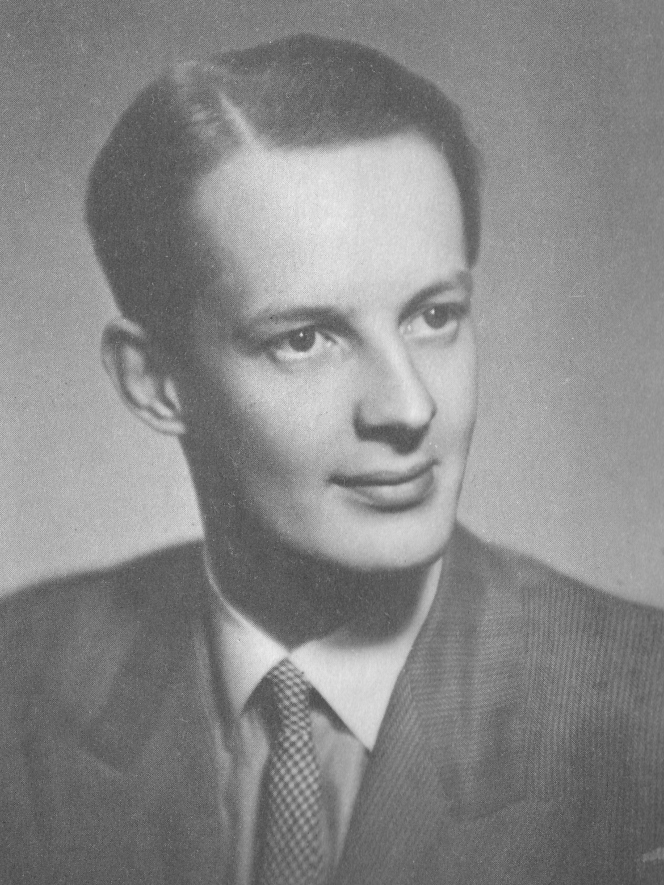
Juha Rihtniemi

Juha Rihtniemi (1927 – 12 January 1971) was a Finnish politician, born in Helsinki. He was a member of the Parliament of Finland from 1958 until his death in 1971, representing the National Coalition Party. He was the chairman of the National Coalition Party from 1965 until his death in 1971. He was a presidential elector in the 1962 and 1968 presidential elections.
