= Liberals (Finland) =

Liberal People's Party Liberaalinen Kansanpuolue
- Leader: Jouni Flemming (last)
- Founded: 1965
- Dissolved: 2011
- Headquarters: Helsinki
- Ideology: Conservative liberalism
- Political position: Centre-right
- European affiliation: Alliance of Liberals and Democrats for Europe Party
- International affiliation: Liberal International

Liberal People's Party (from 2001 Liberals; Finnish: Liberaalinen kansanpuolue) was a conservative-liberal political party in Finland, founded in 1965 as a reunification of the People's Party of Finland and Liberal League.

== History ==
Originally named Liberal People's Party (Finnish: Liberaalinen Kansanpuolue), it restyled its name as Liberals (Liberaalit) in 2000.

Liberals was removed from the party registry in 2007 after the failure to gain a seat in two consecutive parliamentary elections. In 2011, the party dissolved itself as a political party. It continues its basic ideological policy as an independent think tank.

== Leaders ==
- 1965–1968 Mikko Juva
- 1968–1978 Pekka Tarjanne
- 1978–1982 Jaakko Itälä
- 1982–1984 Arne Berner
- 1984–1990 Kyösti Lallukka
- 1990–1992 Kaarina Koivistoinen
- 1992–1993 Kalle Määttä
- 1993–1995 Tuulikki Ukkola
- 1995–1997 Pekka Rytilä
- 1997–2000 Altti Majava
- 2000–2001 Oili Korkeamäki
- 2001–2005 Tomi Riihimäki
- 2005–2008 Ilkka Innamaa
- 2008–2011 Kimmo Eriksson
- 2011–2011 Jouni Flemming

== Elections ==
Election results
Parliament
Year	MPs	Votes	
1966	9	153,259	6.47%
1970	8	150,823	5.95%
1972	7	132,955	5.16%
1975	9	119,534	4.35%
1979	4	106,560	3.68%
1987	0	27,824	0.97%
1991	1	21,210	0.78%
1995	0	16,247	0.58%
1999	0	5,194	0.19%
2003	0	8,776	0.31%
2007	0	3 171	0.11%
Local councils
Year	Councillors	Votes	
1968	309	123,793	5.45%
1972	304	129,736	5.19%
1976	328	127,750	4.76%
1980	203	88,086	3.21%
1988	62	29,339	1.12%
1992	49	26,334	0.99%
1996	25	8,766	0.37%
2004	1	1,016	0.04%
European Parliament
Year	MEPs	Votes	
1996	0	8,305	0.37%
2004	0	3,558	0.21%

== See also ==
- Category:Liberals (Finland) politicians
- Liberalism
- Contributions to liberal theory
- Liberalism worldwide
- List of liberal parties
- Liberal democracy
- Liberalism and centrism in Finland
