= 1972 Finnish parliamentary election =

General election

- 2–3 January 1972

All 200 seats in the Parliament of Finland 101 seats needed for a majority
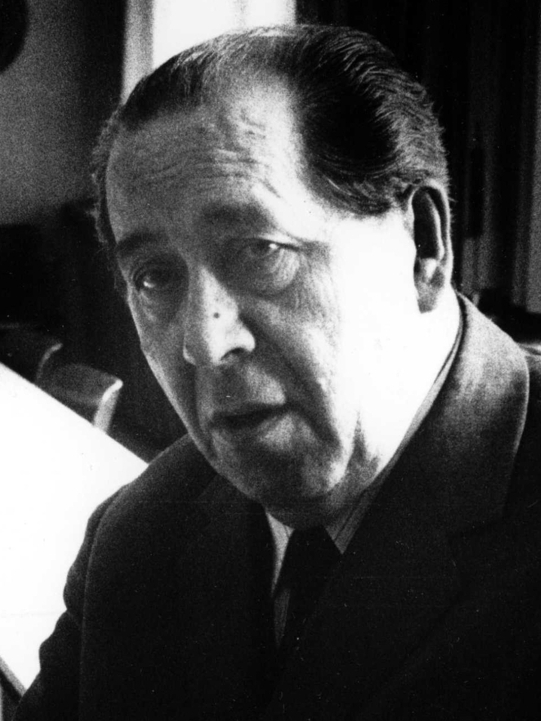

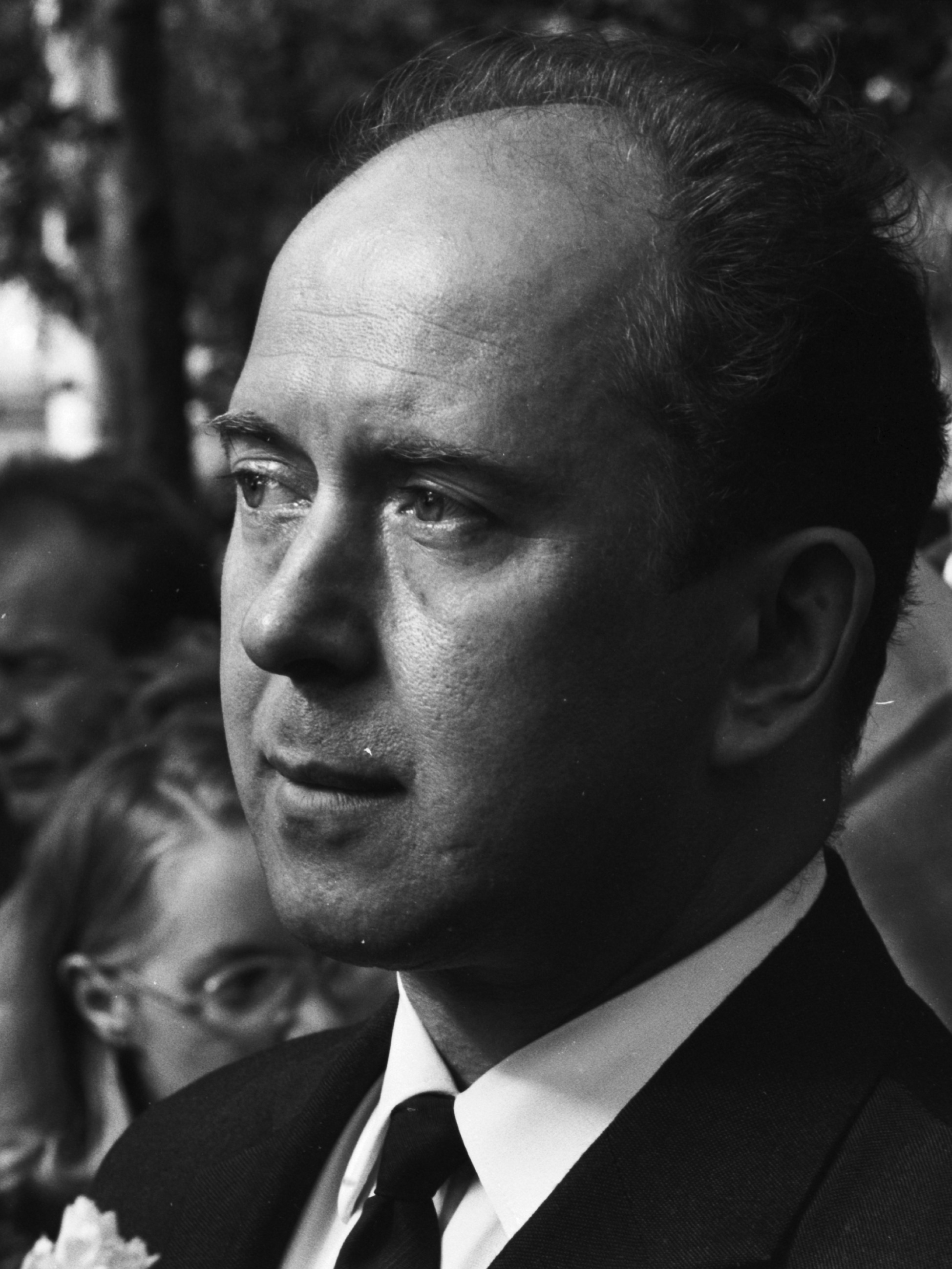

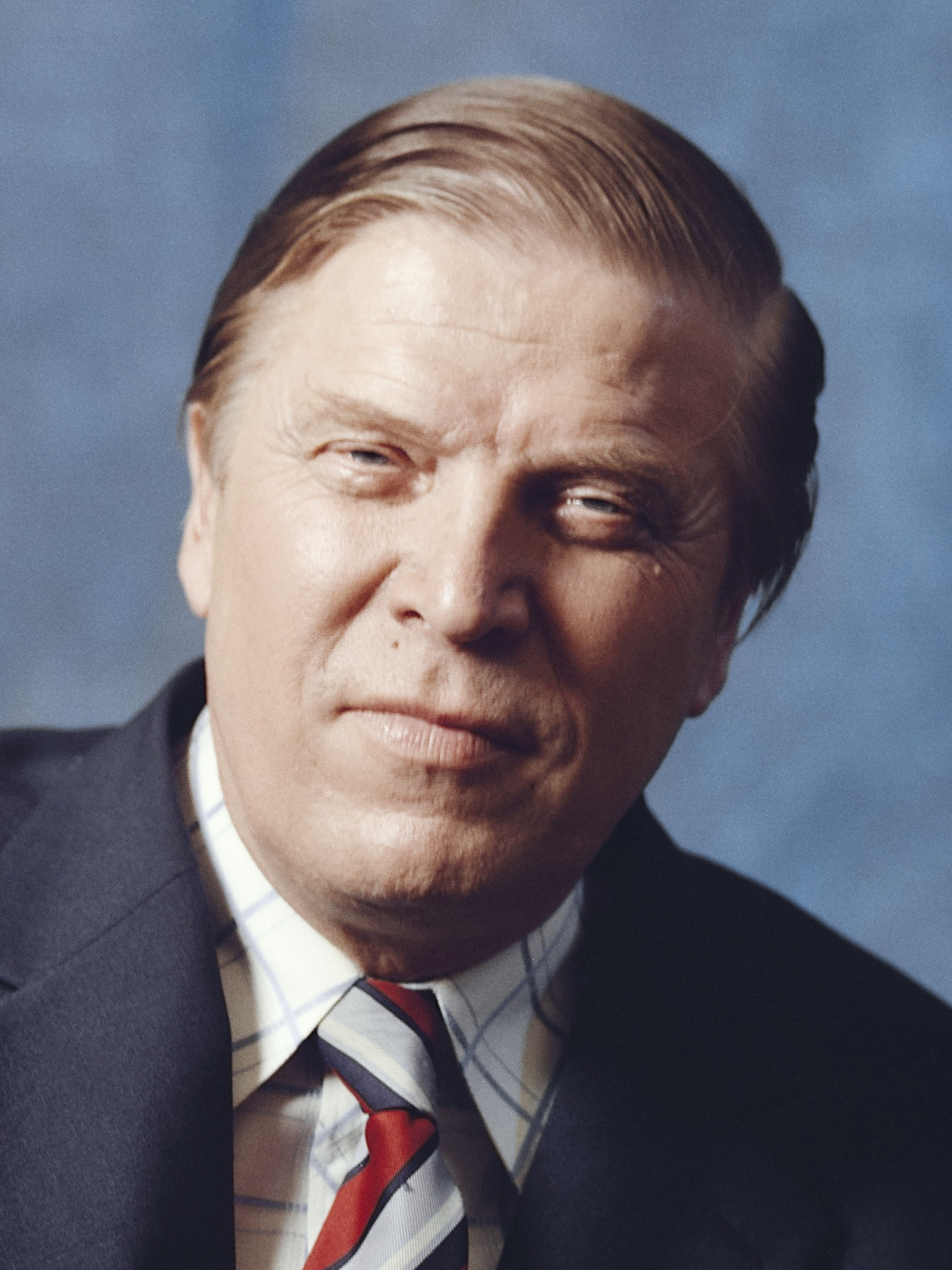

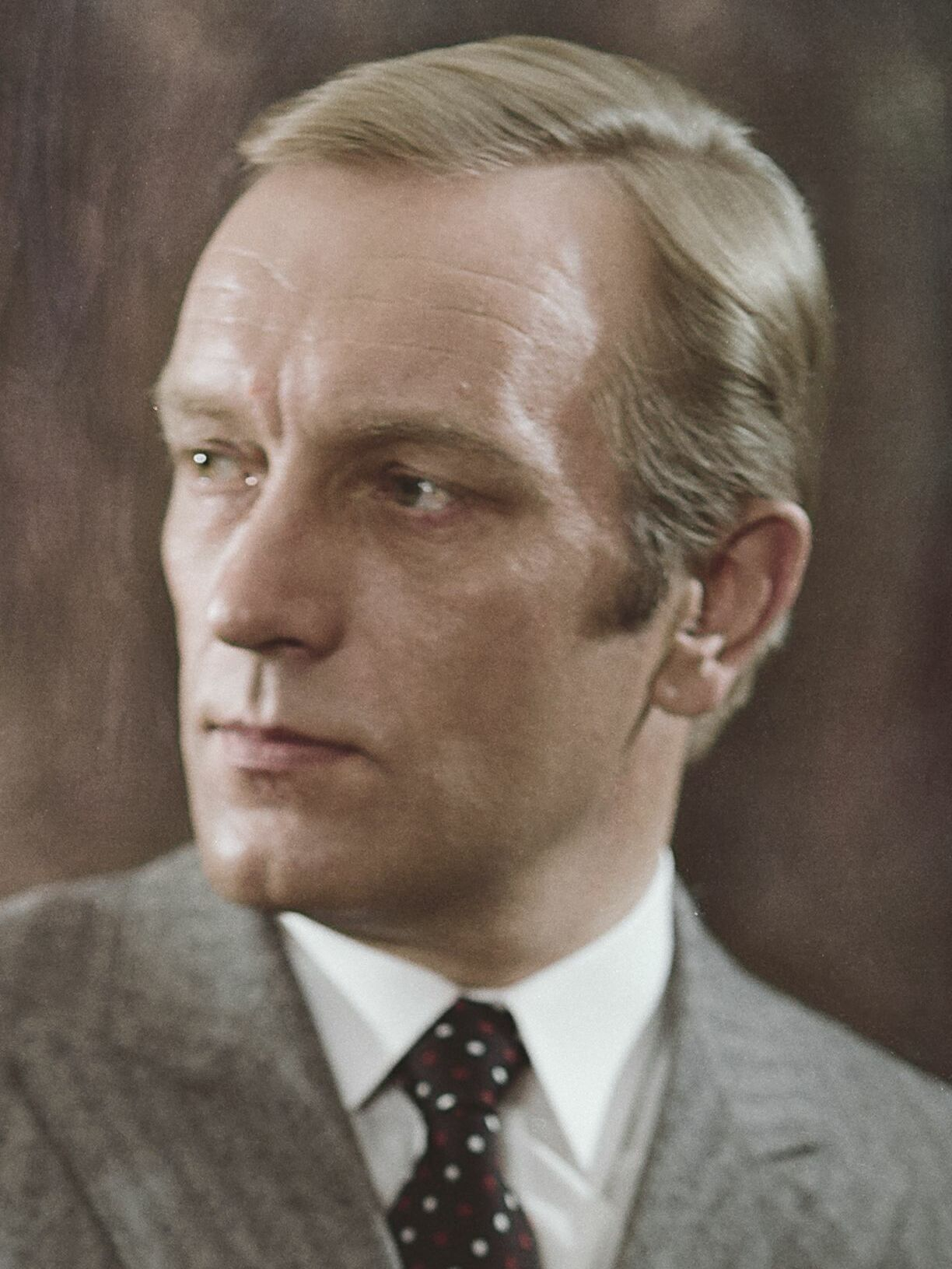

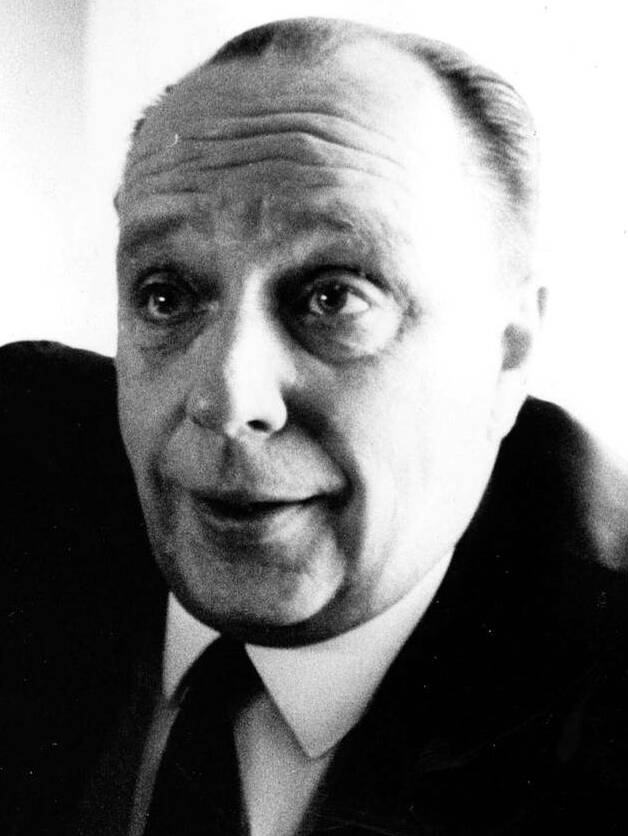

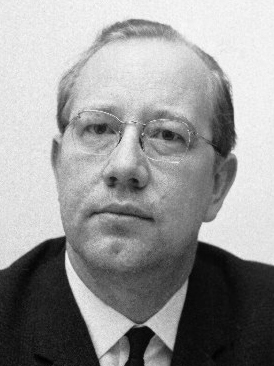

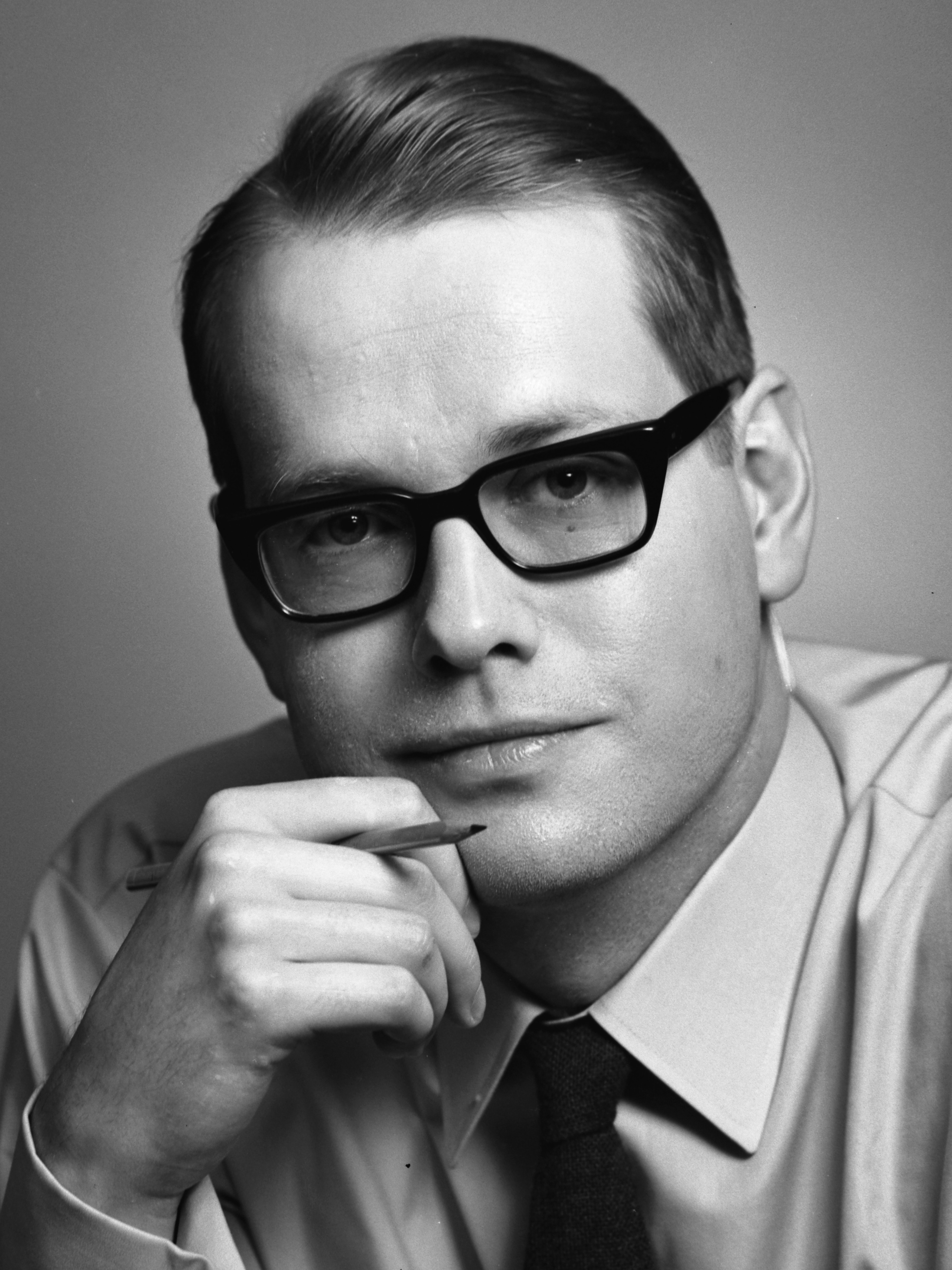

	First party	Second party	Third party
Leader	Rafael Paasio	Ele Alenius	Johannes Virolainen
Party	SDP	SKDL	Centre
Last election	23.43%, 52 seats	16.58%, 36 seats	17.12%, 36 seats
Seats won	55	37	35
Seat change	▲3	▲1	▼1
Popular vote	664,724	438,757	423,039
Percentage	25.78%	17.02%	16.41%
Swing	▲2.35pp	▲0.44pp	▼0.71pp
	Fourth party	Fifth party	Sixth party
Leader	Harri Holkeri	Veikko Vennamo	Jan-Magnus Jansson
Party	National Coalition	Rural Party	RKP
Last election	18.05%, 37 seats	10.49%, 18 seat	5.34%, 11 seats
Seats won	34	18	9
Seat change	▼3	Steady	▼2
Popular vote	453,434	236,206	130,407
Percentage	17.59%	9.16%	5.06%
Swing	▼0.46pp	▼1.33pp	▼0.28pp
	Seventh party	Eighth party	Ninth party
Leader	Pekka Tarjanne	Eino Sares
Party	Liberal People's	Christian League	ÅS
Last election	5.95%, 8 seats	1.13%, 1 seat	0.35%, 1 seat
Seats won	7	4	1
Seat change	▼1	▲3	Steady
Popular vote	132,955	65,228	7,672
Percentage	5.16%	2.53%	0.30%
Swing	▼0.79pp	▲1.40pp	▼0.05pp
Prime Minister before election
Teuvo Aura
Independent
Prime Minister after election
Rafael Paasio
SDP

Parliamentary elections were held in Finland on 2 and 3 January 1972.

== Background ==
Prime Minister Ahti Karjalainen's centre-left coalition government lost the Finnish People's Democratic League in March 1971 as they opposed the removal of government subsidies from certain foods whose prices rose, and was forced to resign in October 1971, due to the disagreements between the Social Democratic Party and the Centre Party over the amount of agricultural subsidies. According to some historians, politicians and journalists, such as Allan Tiitta, Seppo Zetterberg, Johannes Virolainen, Veikko Vennamo and Pekka Hyvärinen, an underlying reason for these early parliamentary elections was President Urho Kekkonen's desire to continue in office without regular presidential elections which had been scheduled for 1974. Re-election as President through exceptional means would require a five-sixths majority in Parliament and, according to the above analysts, Kekkonen hoped that such early elections would reduce the number of Finnish Rural Party MPs, and would thus make the exceptional electoral law's passage in Parliament easier.

Kekkonen remembered bitterly the loud and constant criticism of himself and of his foreign policy that Rural Party leader Veikko Vennamo had practised during the 1968 presidential election campaign, and he was determined not to submit himself to such a vicious election campaign this time. Finland was also negotiating a free trade agreement with the European Economic Community, and most Finnish politicians believed that Finland could get a favourable free trade agreement with President Kekkonen's help.

== Results ==
Party	Votes	%	Seats	+/–
Social Democratic Party	664,724	25.78	55	+3
National Coalition Party	453,434	17.59	34	–3
Finnish People's Democratic League	438,757	17.02	37	+1
Centre Party	423,039	16.41	35	–1
Finnish Rural Party	236,206	9.16	18	0
Liberal People's Party	132,955	5.16	7	–1
Swedish People's Party	130,407	5.06	9	–2
Finnish Christian League	65,228	2.53	4	+3
Social Democratic Union of Workers and Smallholders	25,527	0.99	0	0
Åland Coalition	7,672	0.30	1	0
Total	2,577,949	100.00	200	0
Valid votes	2,577,949	99.65		
Invalid/blank votes	9,111	0.35		
Total votes	2,587,060	100.00		
Registered voters/turnout	3,178,011	81.41		
Source: Tilastokeskus 2004

=== By electoral district ===
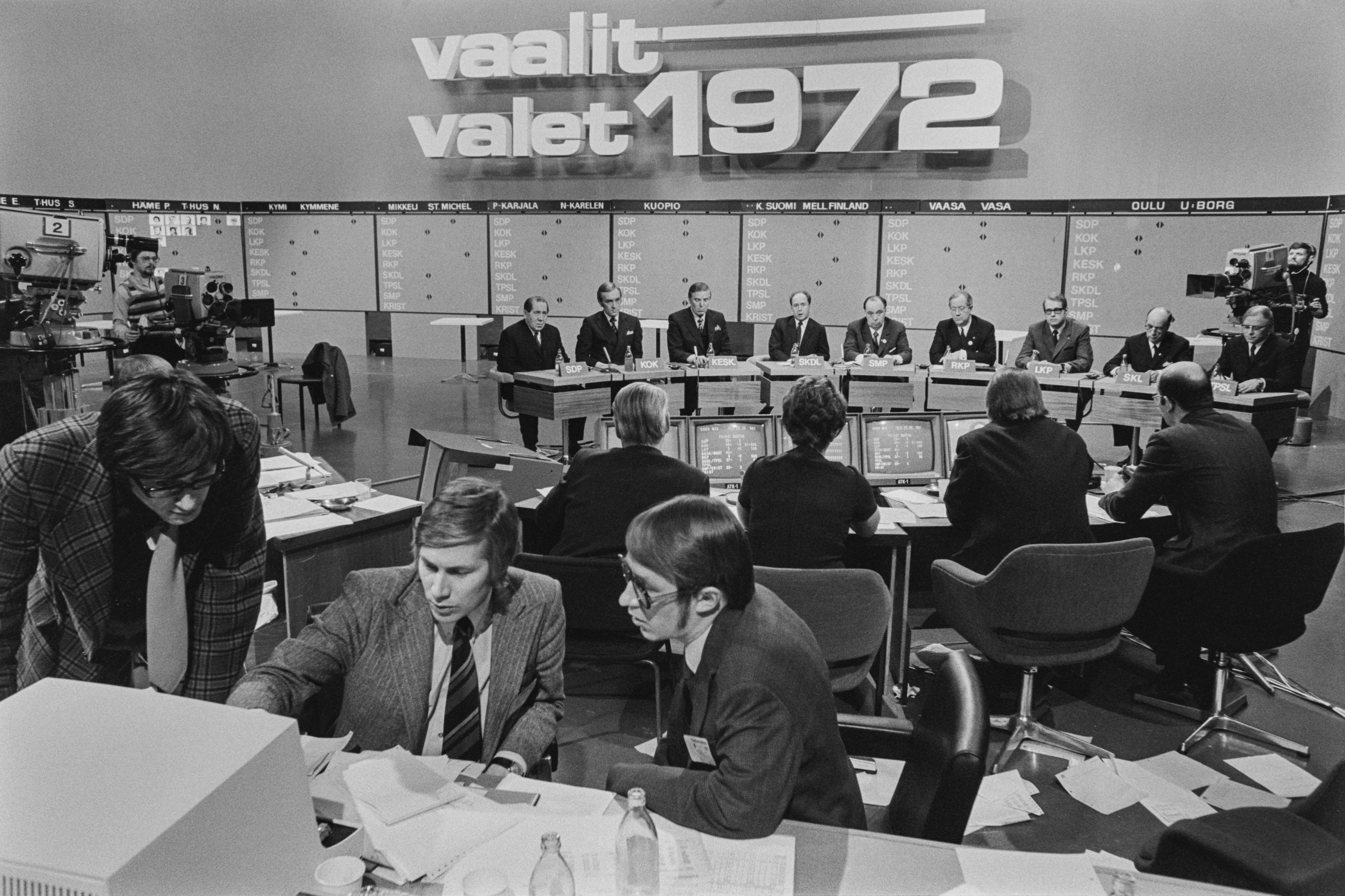
Finland's 1972 parliamentary election results service

Electoral district	Total seats	Seats won								
Electoral district	Total seats	SDP	SKDL	Kesk	Kok	SMP	RKP	LKP	SKL	ÅS
Åland	1									1
Central Finland	10	3	2	2	1	1			1	
Häme	15	5	3	2	4	1				
Helsinki	22	7	4		6	1	2	2		
Kymi	15	6	1	3	3	1			1	
Lapland	9	1	3	3	1	1				
North Karelia	8	2	1	2	1	2				
North Savo	11	2	3	3	1	2				
Oulu	18	2	5	6	2	2		1		
Pirkanmaa	13	5	3		3			1	1	
Satakunta	13	4	3	3	2	1				
South Savo	10	3	1	2	1	1		1	1	
Uusimaa	21	8	3	2	3	1	3	1		
Vaasa	18	3	2	5	3	2	3			
Varsinais-Suomi	16	4	3	2	3	2	1	1		
Total	200	55	37	35	34	18	9	7	4	1
Source: Statistics Finland

== Aftermath ==
To most other parties' surprise, the Rural Party retained their 18 MPs. Government formation was difficult due to partisan bickering and the elections' rather inconclusive results. Rafael Paasio of the Social Democrats formed a minority government of his own party in February 1972, replacing the Helsinki city manager Teuvo Aura's liberal caretaker government. Finally, after tough negotiations, Social Democrat Kalevi Sorsa managed to form a new centre-left majority government that included the Social Democrats, the Centre Party, the Swedish People's Party and the Liberal People's Party in September 1972.

President Kekkonen's goal of re-election by Parliament was achieved in January 1973. It was helped by the Rural Party splitting as thirteen of their MPs left to form the Finnish People's Unity Party, and by most National Coalition MPs supporting his re-election.
