= 1983 Finnish parliamentary election =

General election

← 1979	20–21 March 1983	1987 →

All 200 seats in the Parliament of Finland 101 seats needed for a majority
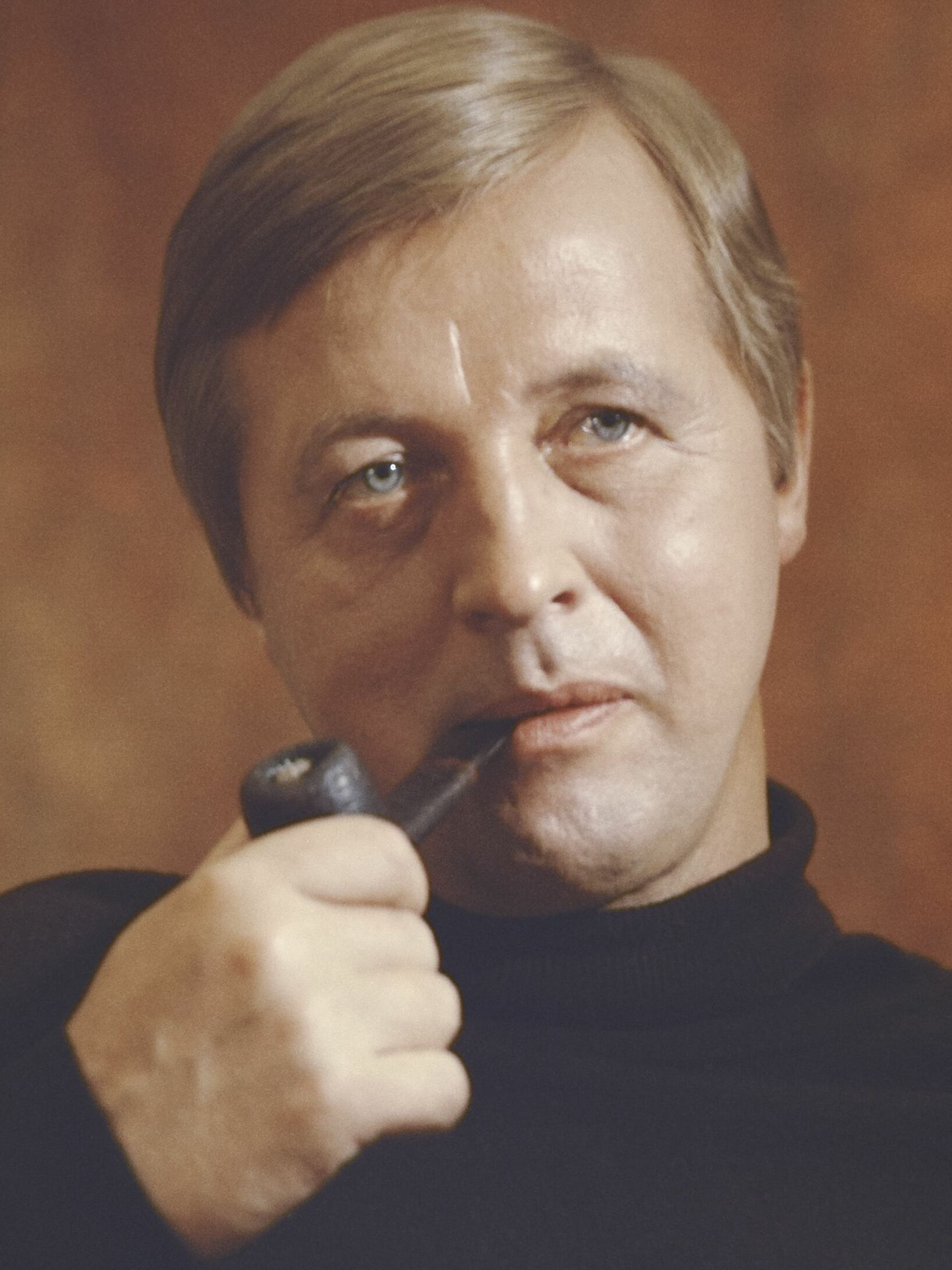

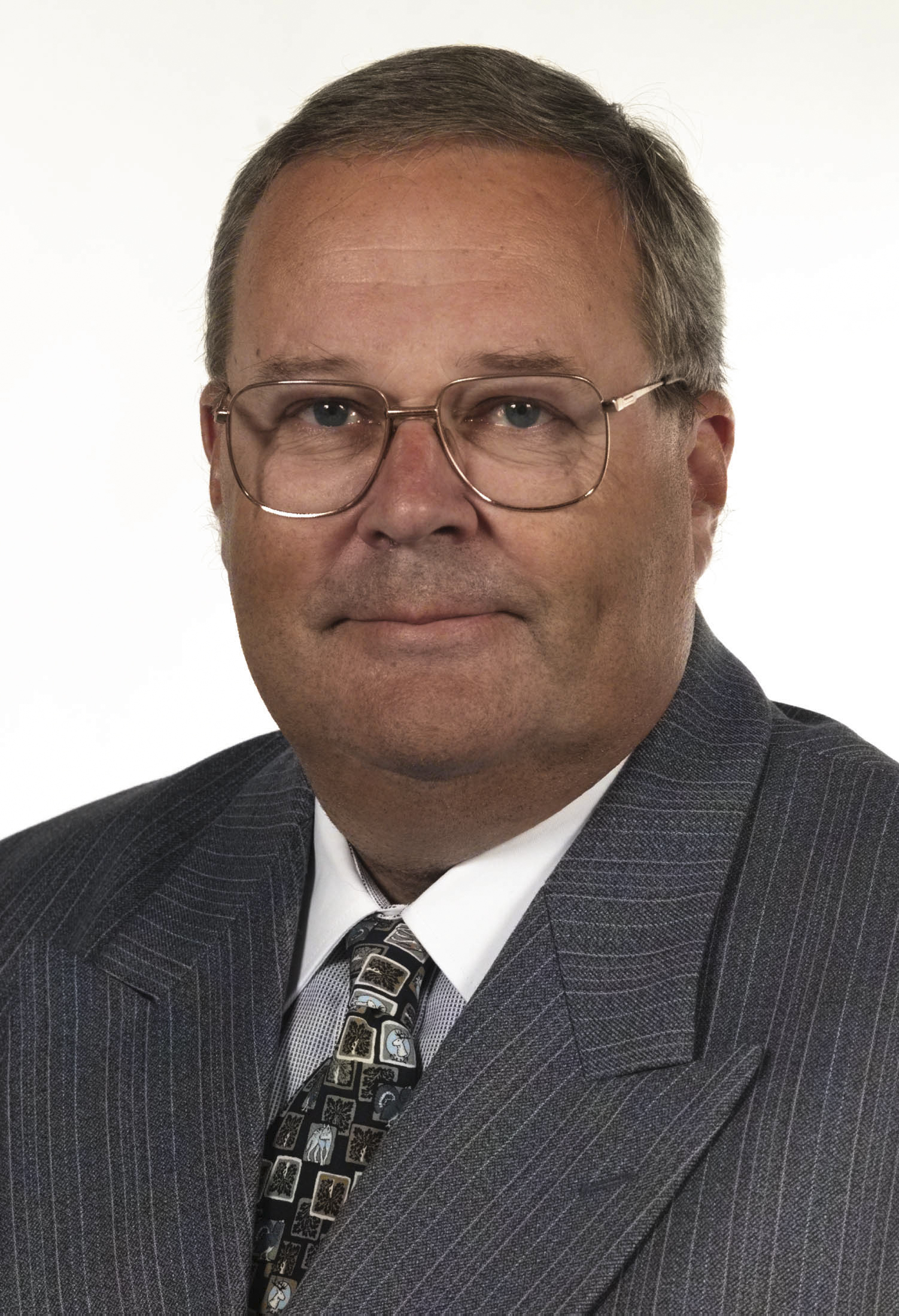

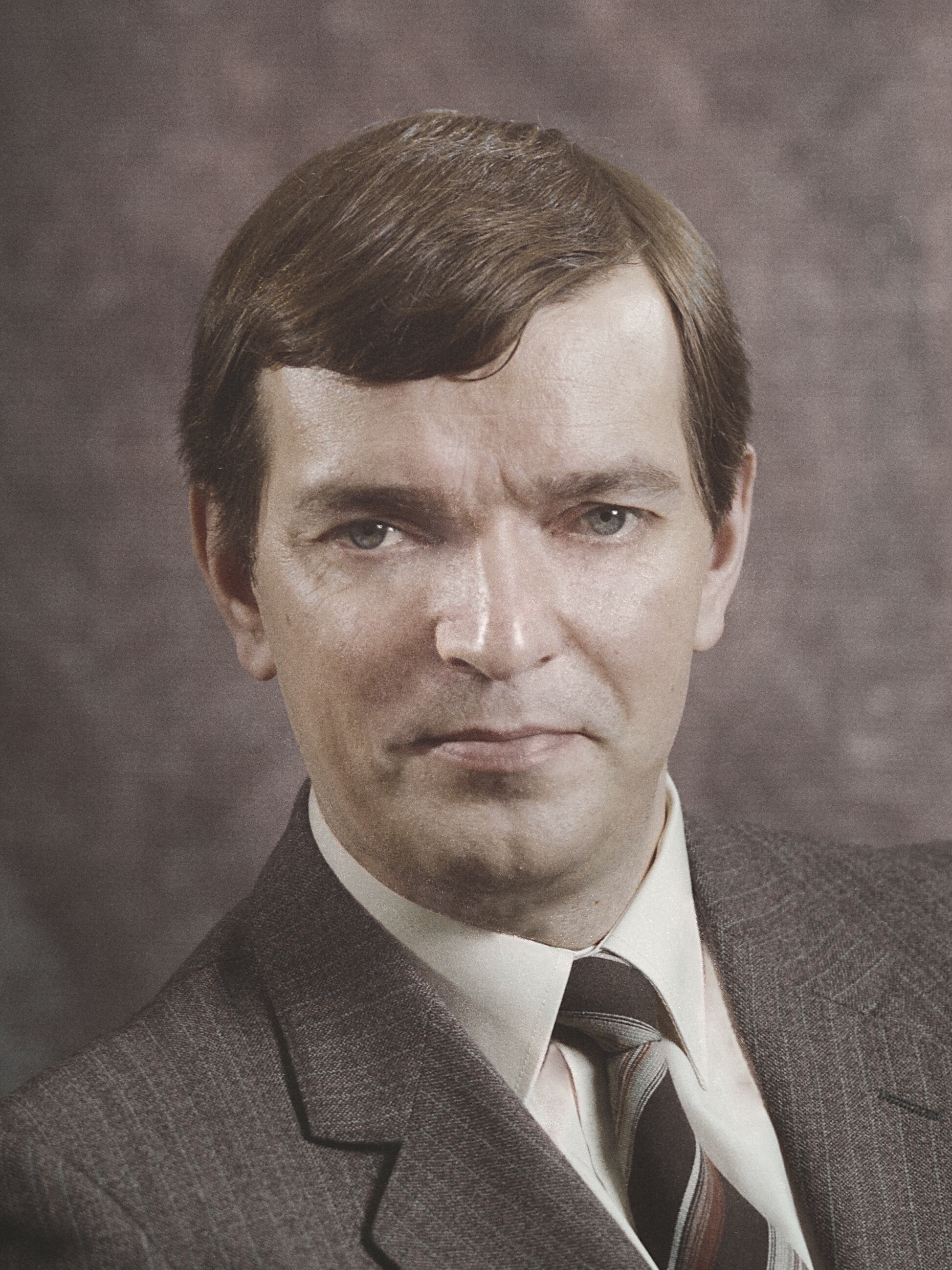

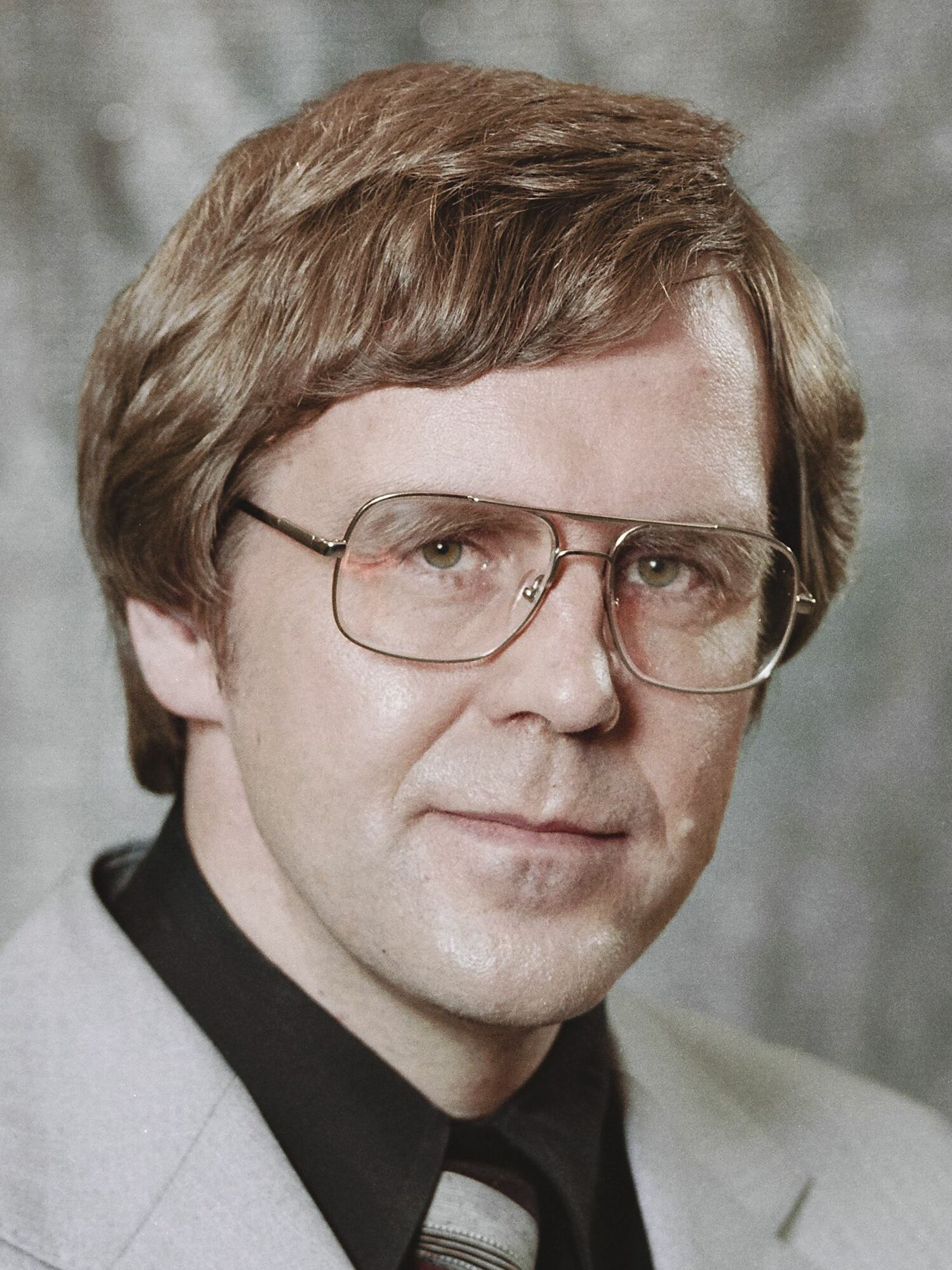

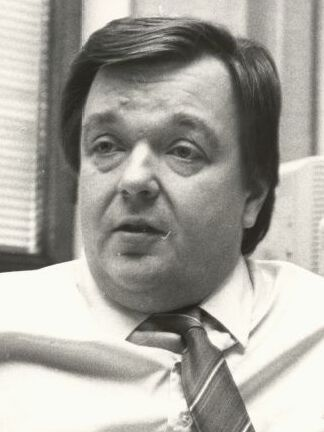

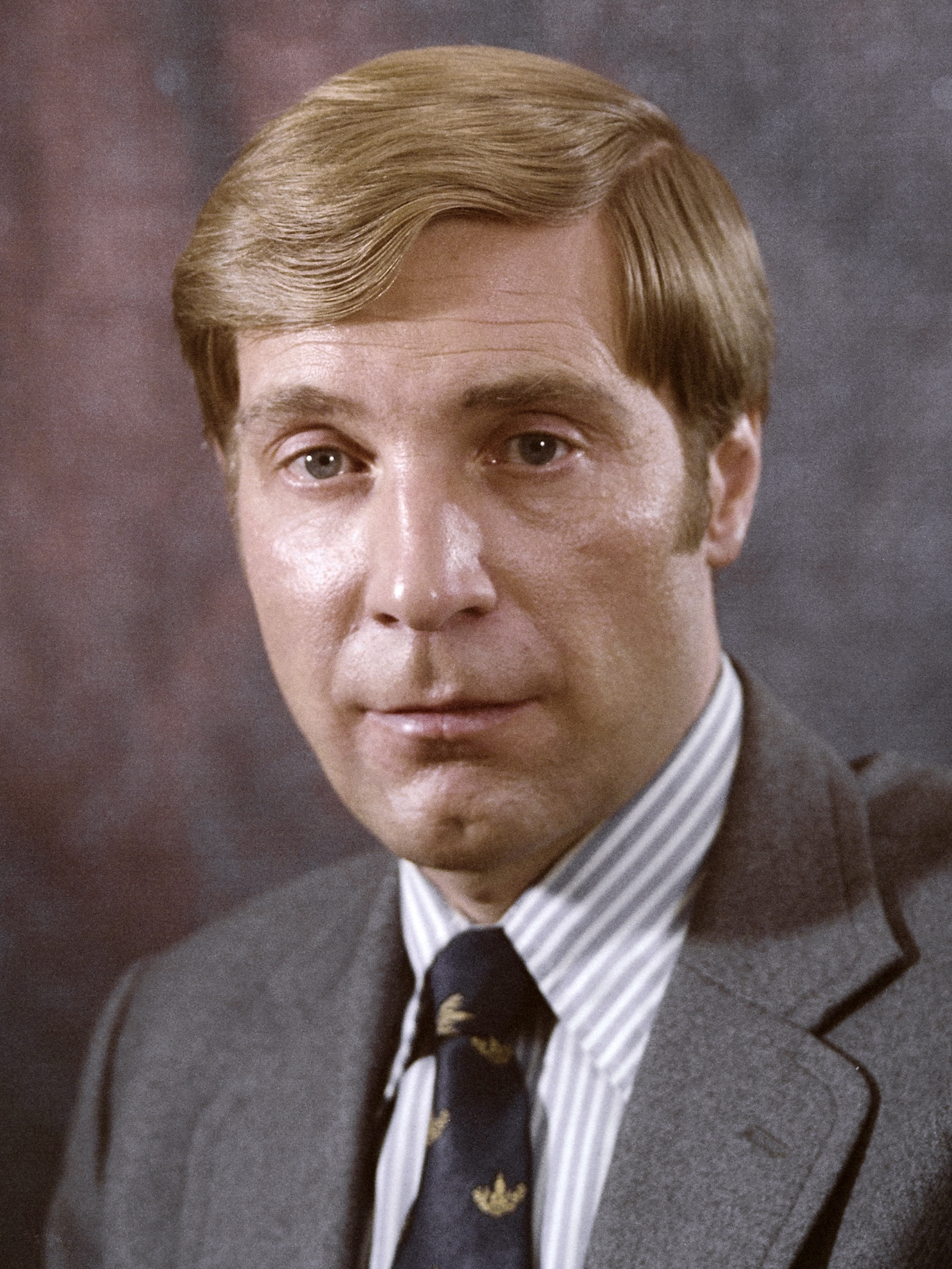

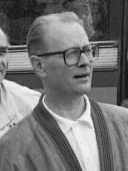
	First party	Second party	Third party
Leader	Kalevi Sorsa	Ilkka Suominen	Paavo Väyrynen
Party	SDP	National Coalition	Centre–Liberal
Last election	23.89%, 52 seats	21.65%, 47 seats	20.97%, 40 seats
Seats won	57	44	38
Seat change	▲5	▼3	▼2
Popular vote	795,953	659,078	525,207
Percentage	26.71%	22.12%	17.63%
Swing	▲2.82pp	▲0.47pp	▼3.37pp
	Fourth party	Fifth party	Sixth party
Leader	Kalevi Kivistö	Pekka Vennamo	Pär Stenbäck
Party	SKDL	Rural Party	RKP
Last election	17.90%, 35 seats	4.58%, 7 seats	4.23%, 9 seats
Seats won	26	17	10
Seat change	▼9	▲10	▲1
Popular vote	400,930	288,711	137,423
Percentage	13.46%	9.69%	4.61%
Swing	▼4.44pp	▲5.11pp	▲0.38pp
	Seventh party
Leader	Esko Almgren
Party	Christian League
Last election	4.78%, 9 seats
Seats won	3
Seat change	▼6
Popular vote	90,410
Percentage	3.03%
Swing	▼1.75pp
Prime Minister before election
Kalevi Sorsa
SDP
Prime Minister after election
Kalevi Sorsa
SDP

Parliamentary elections were held in Finland on 20 and 21 March 1983. The elections were widely regarded as a "protest election" because, contrary to expectations, the major parties with the exception of the Social Democratic Party (SDP) performed poorly; the Liberal People's Party (LKP) lost all its seats in the Eduskunta, while the Finnish Rural Party (SMP) more than doubled its seat tally and the Greens won seats for the first time. The SMP's success was credited, at least in part, to voter distaste for some mainstream parties because of political scandals; no significant policy differences emerged in the election campaign. The SDP won 57 seats, the best performance by a party since World War II.

== Background ==
As was customary in Finland after a presidential election, the government resigned after Mauno Koivisto's victory in the presidential elections in January 1982. It was re-formed the next month with the same four-party coalition; the SDP, the Centre Party (Kesk), the Finnish People's Democratic League (SKDL) and the Swedish People's Party (SFP); and many of the same ministers, with veteran SDP politician Kalevi Sorsa as Prime Minister. Two devaluations in October 1982, amounting to a 10% fall in the value of the markka, caused complaints by the SKDL that low-income groups were the main victims of this measure designed to enhance Finnish competitiveness abroad. The cabinet was dissolved by Sorsa at the end of the year after the SKDL ministers refused to support a government defense proposal. Asked immediately by the president to form a new government, Sorsa did so, but with the LKP taking the place of the SKDL. The government's slender majority of 103 votes in the Eduskunta was not an important handicap, for new elections were scheduled for March 1983.

== Results ==
Party	Votes	%	Seats	+/–
Social Democratic Party	795,953	26.71	57	+5
National Coalition Party	659,078	22.12	44	–3
Centre Party–Liberal People's Party	525,207	17.63	38	–2
Finnish People's Democratic League	400,930	13.46	26	–9
Finnish Rural Party	288,711	9.69	17	+10
Swedish People's Party	137,423	4.61	10	+1
Finnish Christian League	90,410	3.03	3	–6
Greens	43,754	1.47	2	New
Constitutional Right Party	11,104	0.37	1	+1
Åland Coalition	9,458	0.32	1	0
League for Civil Democracy	2,335	0.08	0	New
Others	15,331	0.51	1	+1
Total	2,979,694	100.00	200	0
Valid votes	2,979,694	99.56		
Invalid/blank votes	13,276	0.44		
Total votes	2,992,970	100.00		
Registered voters/turnout	3,951,932	75.73		
Source: Tilastokeskus, Vihreän liiton

=== By electoral district ===
Electoral district	Total seats	Seats won										
Electoral district	Total seats	SDP	Kok	Kesk–LKP	SKDL	SMP	RKP	SKL	Vihr	POP	ÅS	Others
Åland	1										1	
Central Finland	10	3	2	3	2							
Häme	15	5	5	2	2	1						
Helsinki	20	6	6	1	2	1	2		1	1		
Kymi	14	6	3	2	1	1		1				
Lapland	8	1	1	4	1							1
North Karelia	7	3	1	2		1						
North Savo	10	2	1	3	2	2						
Oulu	18	3	2	7	4	2						
Pirkanmaa	13	4	4	1	3	1						
Satakunta	13	4	3	2	2	2						
South Savo	9	3	2	2		1		1				
Uusimaa	27	9	7	1	3	2	3	1	1			
Vaasa	18	3	3	6	1	1	4					
Varsinais-Suomi	17	5	4	2	3	2	1					
Total	200	57	44	38	26	17	10	3	2	1	1	1
Source: Statistics Finland

== Aftermath ==
Seven weeks of negotiations led to the formation of a four-party coalition composed of the old standbys, the SDP, Kesk, the SFP, and, for the first time, the SMP. The SMP was given the portfolios for taxation (Deputy Minister of Finance) and for labor, with the aim of taming it through ministerial responsibility. Because the government, led by the SDP's Sorsa, had the support of only 122 votes out of 200, rather than the 134 needed to ensure the passage of much economic legislation, it might not have been expected to last long. However, it distinguished itself, however, by being the first cabinet since World War II to serve out a full term. Its survival until the March 1987 elections was an indication of a newly won stability in Finnish politics.

The Sorsa cabinet stressed the continuation of traditional Finnish foreign policy, the expansion of trade with the West to counter what some saw as too great dependence on Soviet trade, and the adoption of measures to reduce inflation. The economic measures of the government were stringent and fiscally conservative. Public awareness of the necessity of a small exporting nation's remaining competitive allowed the adoption of frugal policies. The 1984 biannual incomes policy arrangement was also modest in its scope. The rival demands for the one for 1986 were less so, however, and President Koivisto had to intervene to ease hard negotiations. One segment of the work force, civil servants, won a large pay increase for itself after a seven-week strike in the spring of 1986. The government also brought inflation down from the double-digit levels of the early 1980s, but it was less successful in lowering unemployment, which remained steady at about 7 percent.

Although the government was to be long-lived, it was not free of tensions. In January 1984, trouble erupted when its three non-socialist parties made public a list of nine points on which they disagreed with the SDP. The issues were domestic in character, and they centered on issues such as the methods of calculation and payment for child-care allowances, the advisability of nuclear power plant construction, wage package negotiation methods, and financial measures to aid farmers and small businessmen. The storm caused by the document was calmed by the political skills of the prime minister and through a lessened adamancy on the part of Kesk.

Despite overall agreement on many major issues and the dominance of consensus politics in the governing of the country, the parties' struggle for power was nevertheless fierce. Attacks on the SDP by its coalition partner Kesk during 1986 were seen by some to stem from Kesk's desire for an opening to the right and for the eventual formation of a center-right government after the 1987 elections. The attacks, especially those of Foreign Minister Paavo Vayrynen, intensified in the late summer. The young Kesk leader particularly denounced Sorsa's handling of trade with the Soviet Union. Sorsa successfully counterattacked in the fall, which forced Vayrynen to stop his campaign.
