= Usadishche, Vyborgsky District, Leningrad Oblast =

Rural locality in Vyborgsky District, Russia

Coordinates: 60.7881°N 28.4342°E

Usadishche (Russian: Уса́дище; Finnish: Kintere) was formerly a rural locality on Karelian Isthmus, in Vyborgsky District of Leningrad Oblast, near the Russia–Finland border. Until the Winter War and Continuation War, it had been part of the Vahviala municipality of the Viipuri Province of Finland, partially lost to the Soviet Union in 1944.
