= 1975 Finnish parliamentary election =

General election

← 1972	21–22 September 1975	1979 →

All 200 seats in the Parliament of Finland 101 seats needed for a majority
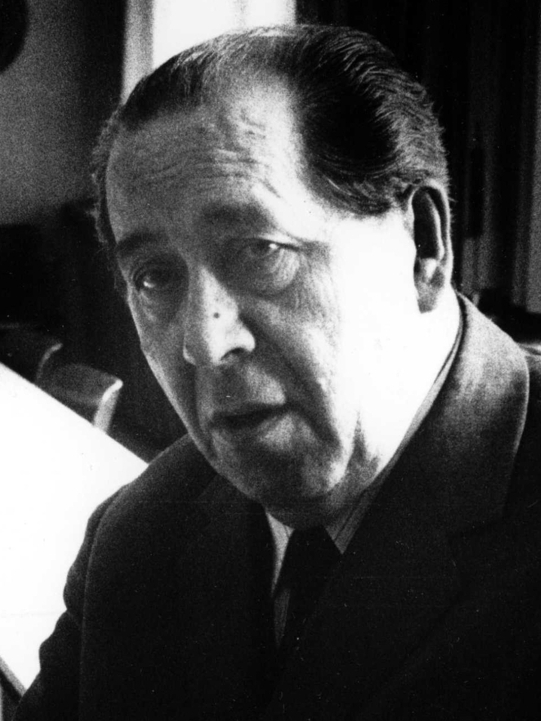

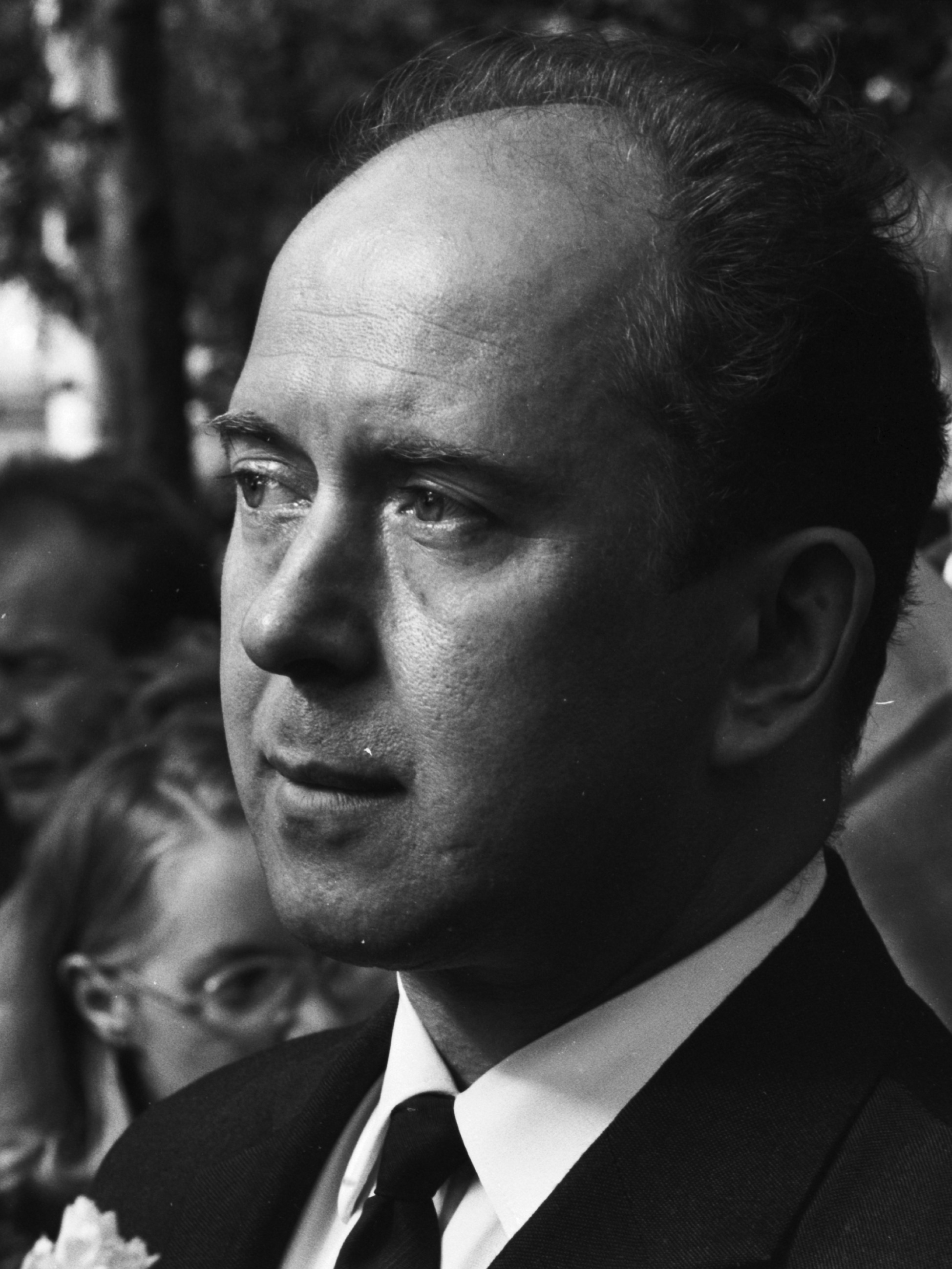

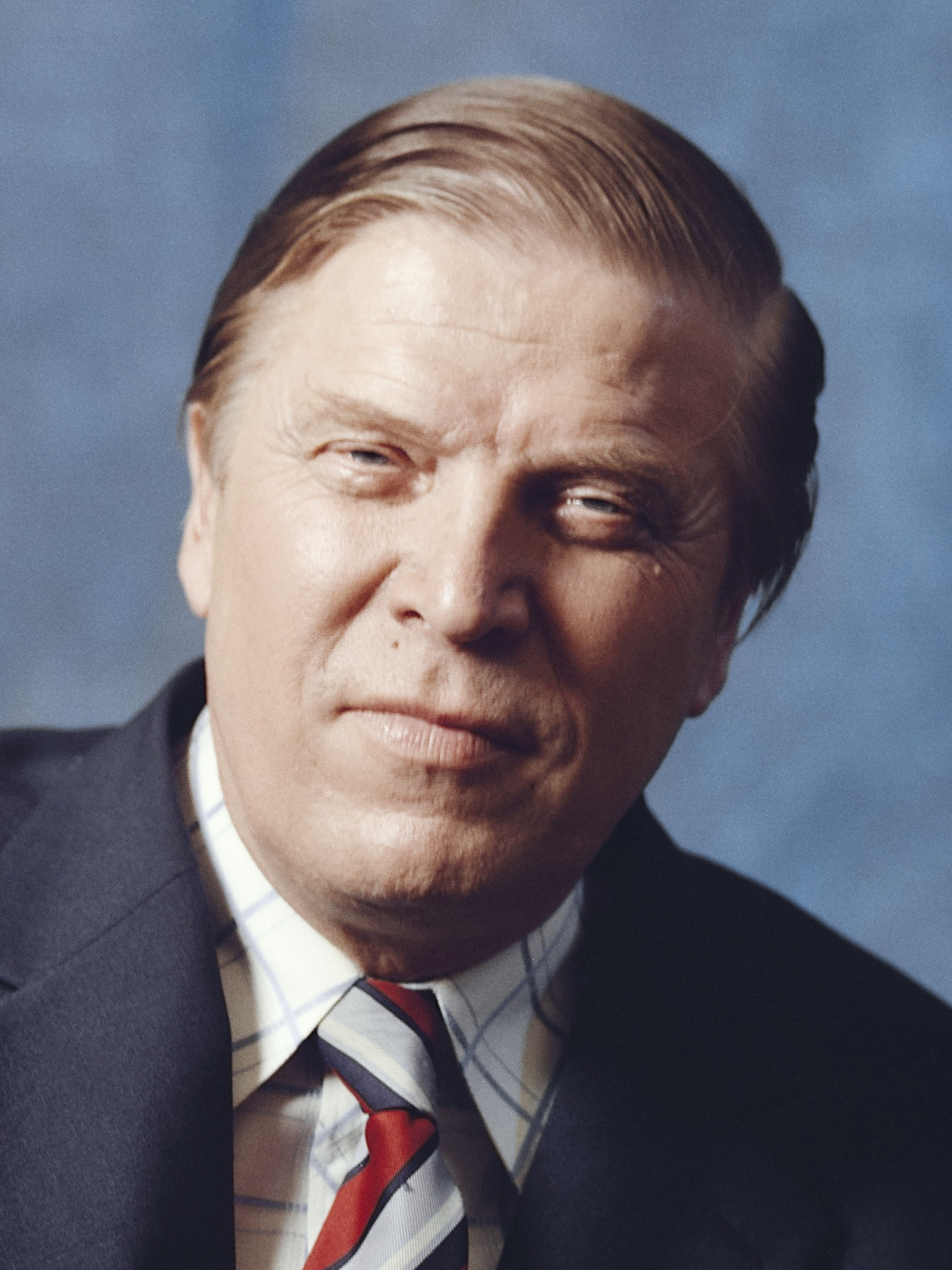

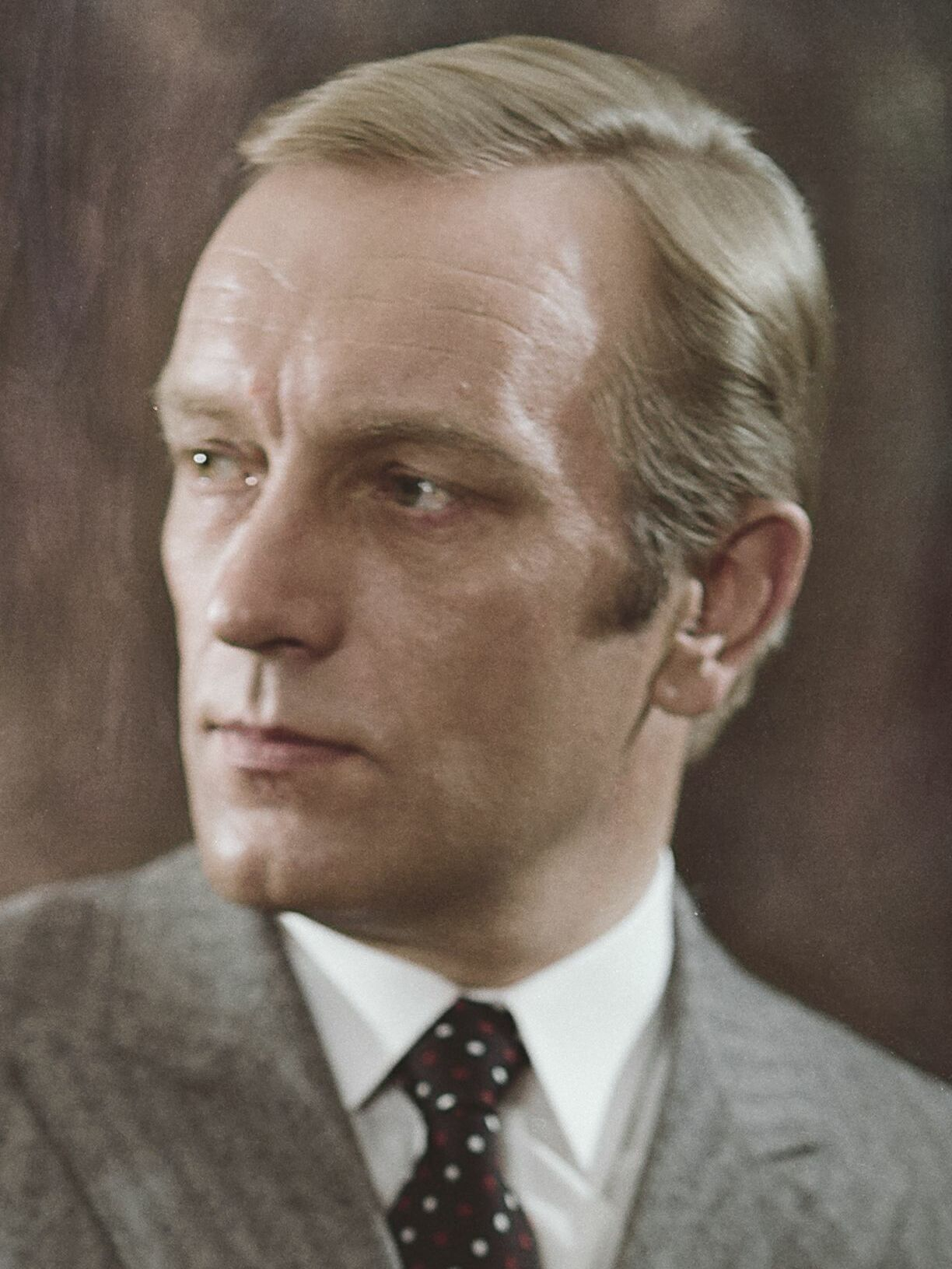

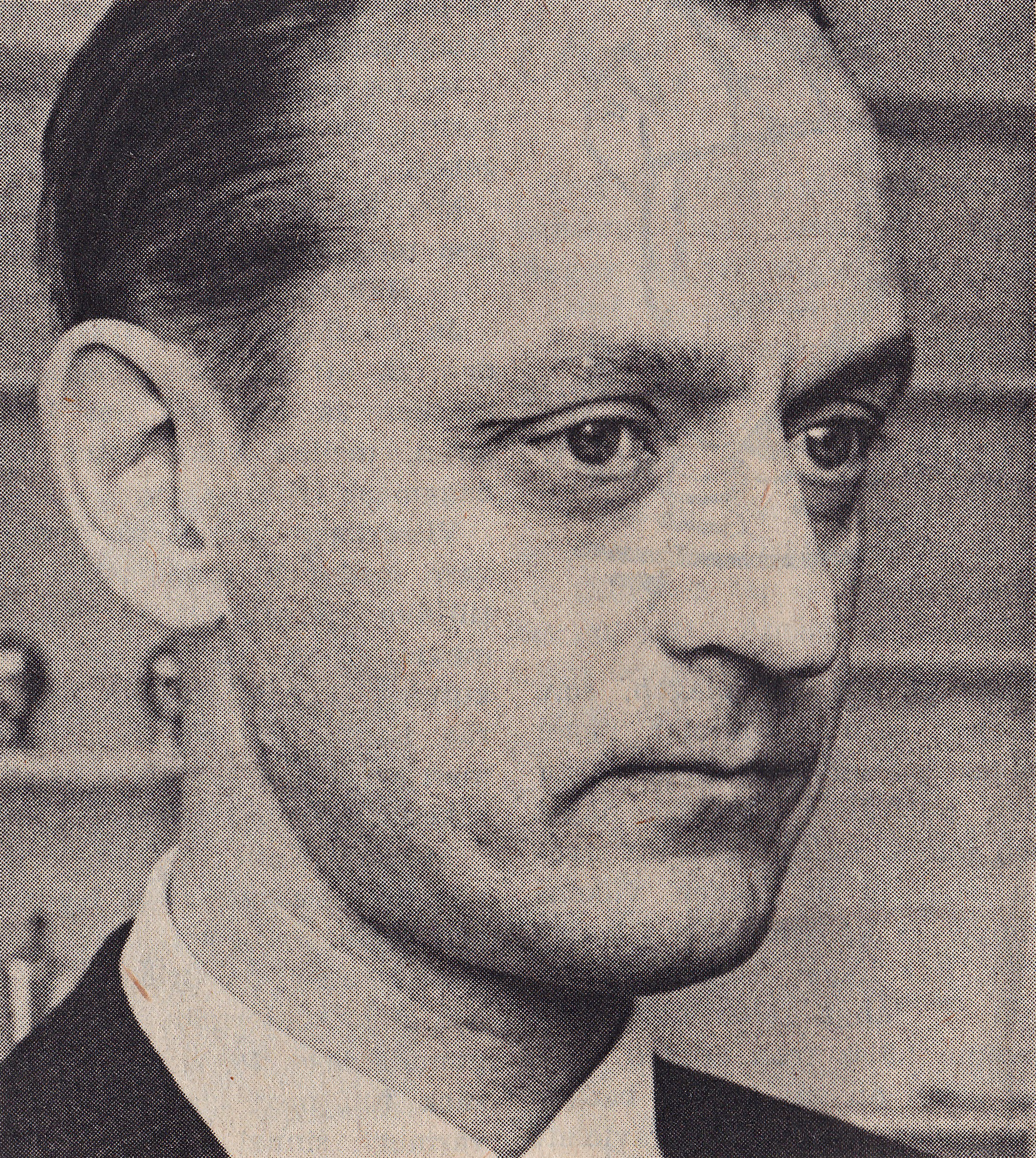

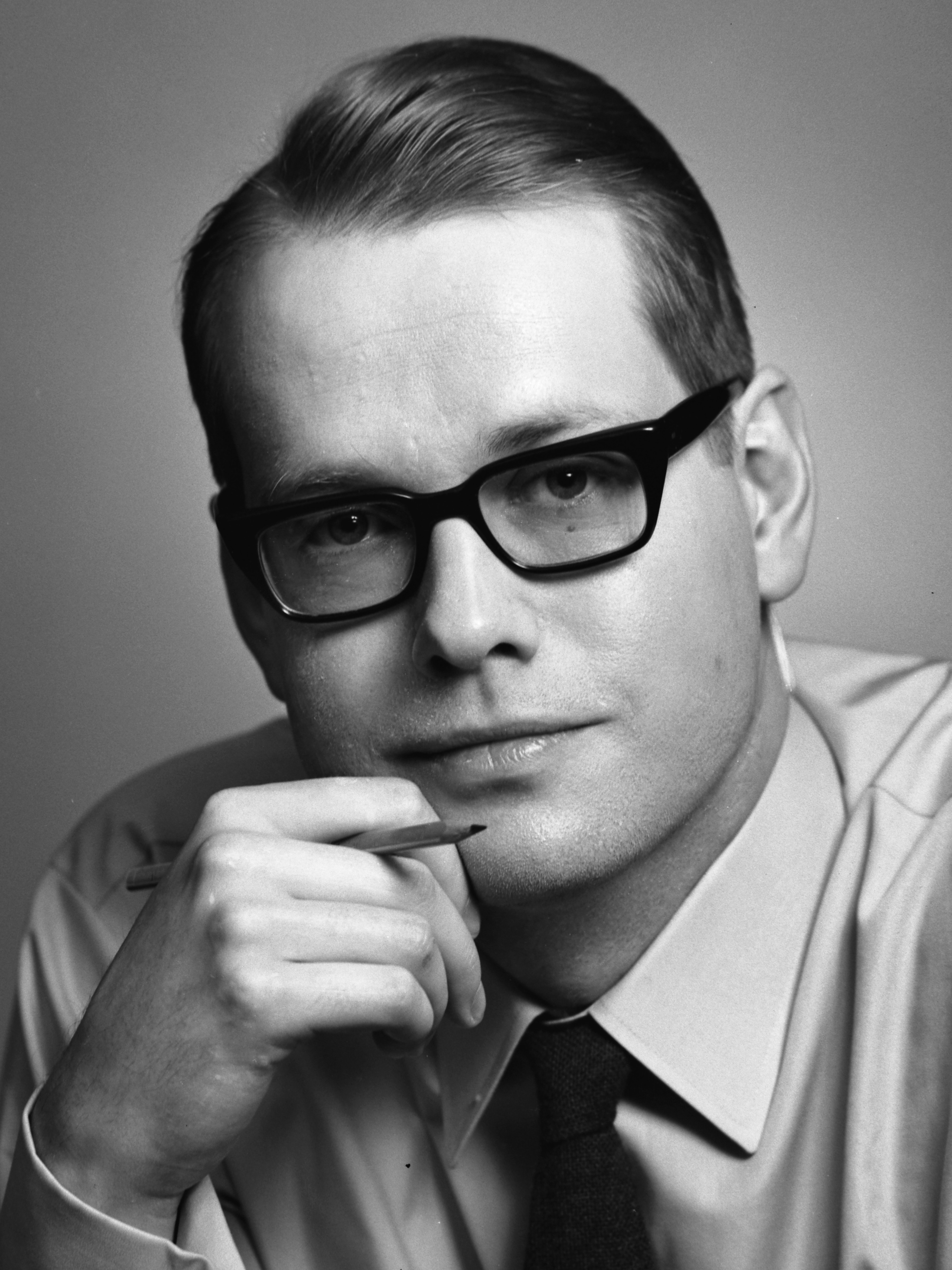

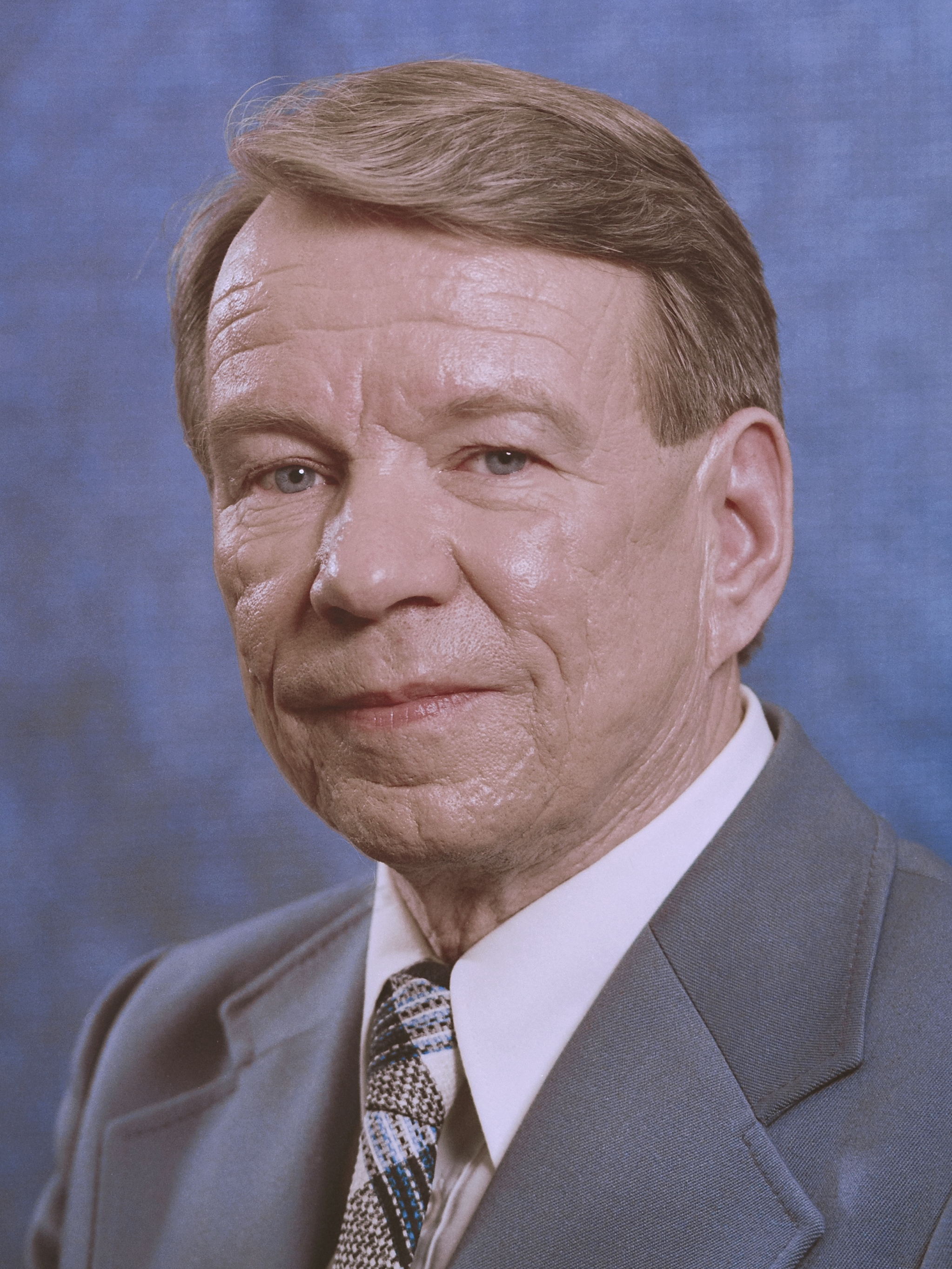

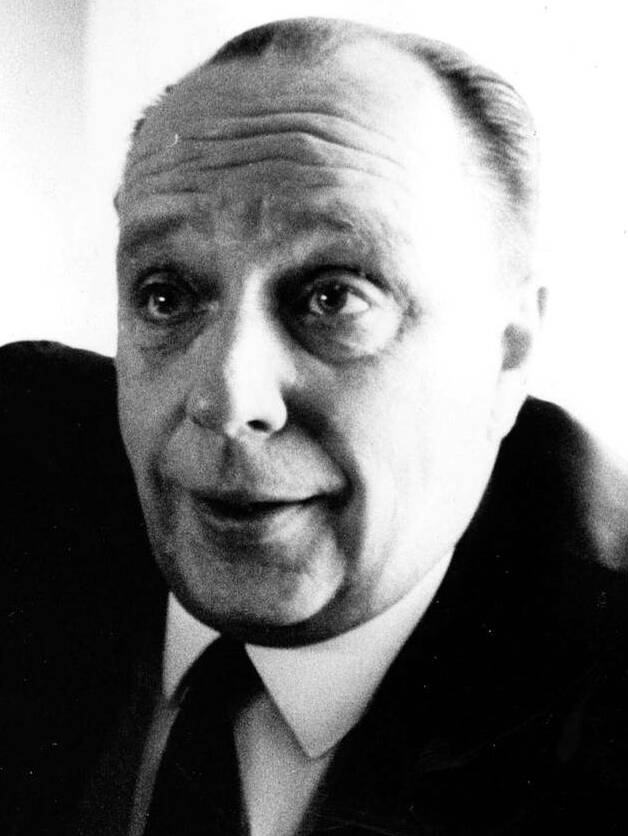
	First party	Second party	Third party
Leader	Rafael Paasio	Ele Alenius	Johannes Virolainen
Party	SDP	SKDL	Centre
Last election	25.78%, 55 seats	17.02%, 37 seats	16.41%, 35 seats
Seats won	54	40	39
Seat change	▼1	▲3	▲4
Popular vote	683,590	519,483	484,772
Percentage	24.86%	18.89%	17.63%
Swing	▼0.92pp	▲1.87pp	▲1.22pp
	Fourth party	Fifth party	Sixth party
Leader	Harri Holkeri	Carl Olof Tallgren	Pekka Tarjanne
Party	National Coalition	RKP	Liberal People's
Last election	17.59%, 34 seats	5.06%, 9 seats	5.16%, 7 seats
Seats won	35	9	9
Seat change	▲1	Steady	▲2
Popular vote	505,145	128,211	119,534
Percentage	18.37%	4.66%	4.35%
Swing	▲0.78pp	▼0.40pp	▼0.81pp
	Seventh party	Eighth party
Leader	Raino Westerholm	Veikko Vennamo
Party	Christian League	Rural Party
Last election	2.53%, 4 seats	9.16%, 18 seats
Seats won	9	2
Seat change	▲5	▼16
Popular vote	90,599	98,815
Percentage	3.29%	3.59%
Swing	▲0.76pp	▼5.57pp
Prime Minister before election
Keijo Liinamaa
Independent
Prime Minister after election
Martti Miettunen
Centre

Parliamentary elections were held in Finland on 21 and 22 September 1975.

== Background ==
Prime Minister Kalevi Sorsa's Social Democratic Party government survived until June 1975. It resigned because of internal disagreements over the ways to combat Finland's recession, which had largely been caused by the 1973 oil crisis, as well as the government's increased spending and taxes. The Social Democrats and Centre Party also disagreed on regional policy over the extent to which the national government should re-distribute power and tax revenues to cities, towns and administrative provinces.

President Urho Kekkonen had gradually become dissatisfied with the performance of Prime Minister Sorsa, Finance Minister Johannes Virolainen and Foreign Minister Ahti Karjalainen: either they were not competent, diligent or courageous enough, or they spent too much time in partisan disputes, or - in Virolainen's case, especially - their foreign policy ability or understanding was not good enough. Although Helsinki was to host the Conference on Security and Co-operation in Europe (CSCE) at the end of July and at the start of August 1975, Kekkonen did not worry about the possibly negative effect on Finland's international image of having a caretaker government. He appointed it, and chose Keijo Liinamaa of the Social Democratic Party as Prime Minister, who was the state labour disputes mediator.

== Campaign ==
The opposition parties campaigned with varied slogans; the Finnish People's Democratic League claimed to be loyal supporters of Kekkonen's foreign policy towards the Soviet Union and to be even more faithful defenders of the working class than the Social Democrats; the National Coalition Party promised voters lower taxes and more security; the Finnish Rural Party bitterly condemned Kekkonen's allegedly authoritarian presidency, and his "servile" foreign policy towards the Soviet Union.

The right-wing Constitutional People's Party accused Kekkonen of violating the Constitution's spirit by forcing Parliament to re-elect him as President through an exceptional law in 1973, and the Finnish Christian League kept opposing abortion, pornography, the sale of beer in grocery stores, and the public mocking of Christian values.

== Results ==
Party	Votes	%	Seats	+/–
Social Democratic Party	683,590	24.86	54	–1
Finnish People's Democratic League	519,483	18.89	40	+3
National Coalition Party	505,145	18.37	35	+1
Centre Party	484,772	17.63	39	+4
Swedish People's Party	128,211	4.66	9	0
Liberal People's Party	119,534	4.35	9	+2
Finnish Rural Party	98,815	3.59	2	–16
Finnish Christian League	90,599	3.29	9	+5
Finnish People's Unity Party	45,402	1.65	1	New
Constitutional People's Party	43,344	1.58	1	New
Party of Finnish Entrepreneurs	11,475	0.42	0	New
Åland Coalition	9,482	0.34	1	0
Socialist Workers Party	9,457	0.34	0	New
Others	509	0.02	0	–
Total	2,749,818	100.00	200	0
Valid votes	2,749,818	99.59		
Invalid/blank votes	11,405	0.41		
Total votes	2,761,223	100.00		
Registered voters/turnout	3,741,460	73.80		
Source: Tilastokeskus 2004, Suomen virallinen tilasto

=== By electoral district ===
Electoral district	Total seats	Seats won										
Electoral district	Total seats	SDP	SKDL	Kesk	Kok	RKP	LKP	SKL	SMP	SKYP	SPK	ÅS
Åland	1											1
Central Finland	10	3	2	3	2							
Häme	15	5	3	2	4			1				
Helsinki	21	6	4		4	3	2	1			1	
Kymi	15	6	1	3	3		1	1				
Lapland	9	1	3	4	1							
North Karelia	8	3	1	2	1			1				
North Savo	11	2	3	4	1				1			
Oulu	17	2	5	6	1		1	1	1			
Pirkanmaa	13	4	4	1	3			1				
Satakunta	13	4	3	2	3		1					
South Savo	9	3	1	3	2							
Uusimaa	24	8	4	2	5	2	2	1				
Vaasa	18	3	2	5	2	3	1	1		1		
Varsinais-Suomi	16	4	4	2	3	1	1	1				
Total	200	54	40	39	35	9	9	9	2	1	1	1
Source: Statistics Finland

== Aftermath ==
Government formation in the midst of a quickly deepening recession and after an inconclusive election proved very painstaking. Veteran Centrist politician Martti Miettunen finally succeeded, with the help of Kekkonen's strongly-worded televised speech, in forming a centre-left majority "emergency" government in November 1975. It lasted until September 1976, when the Social Democrats and Finnish People's Democratic League left it. Miettunen then formed a centrist minority government.
