= 1979 Finnish parliamentary election =

General election

← 1975	18–19 March 1979	1983 →

All 200 seats in the Parliament of Finland 101 seats needed for a majority
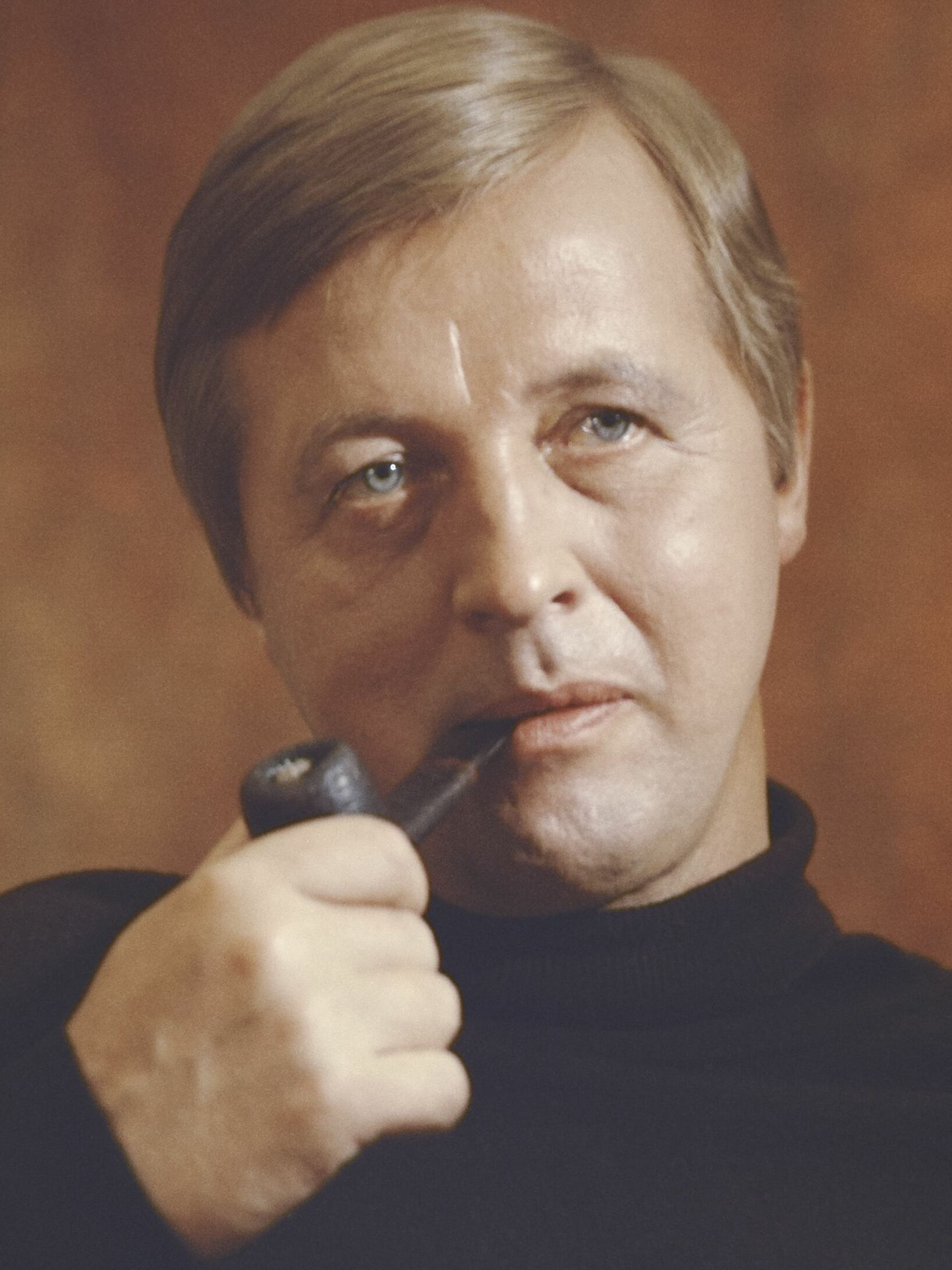

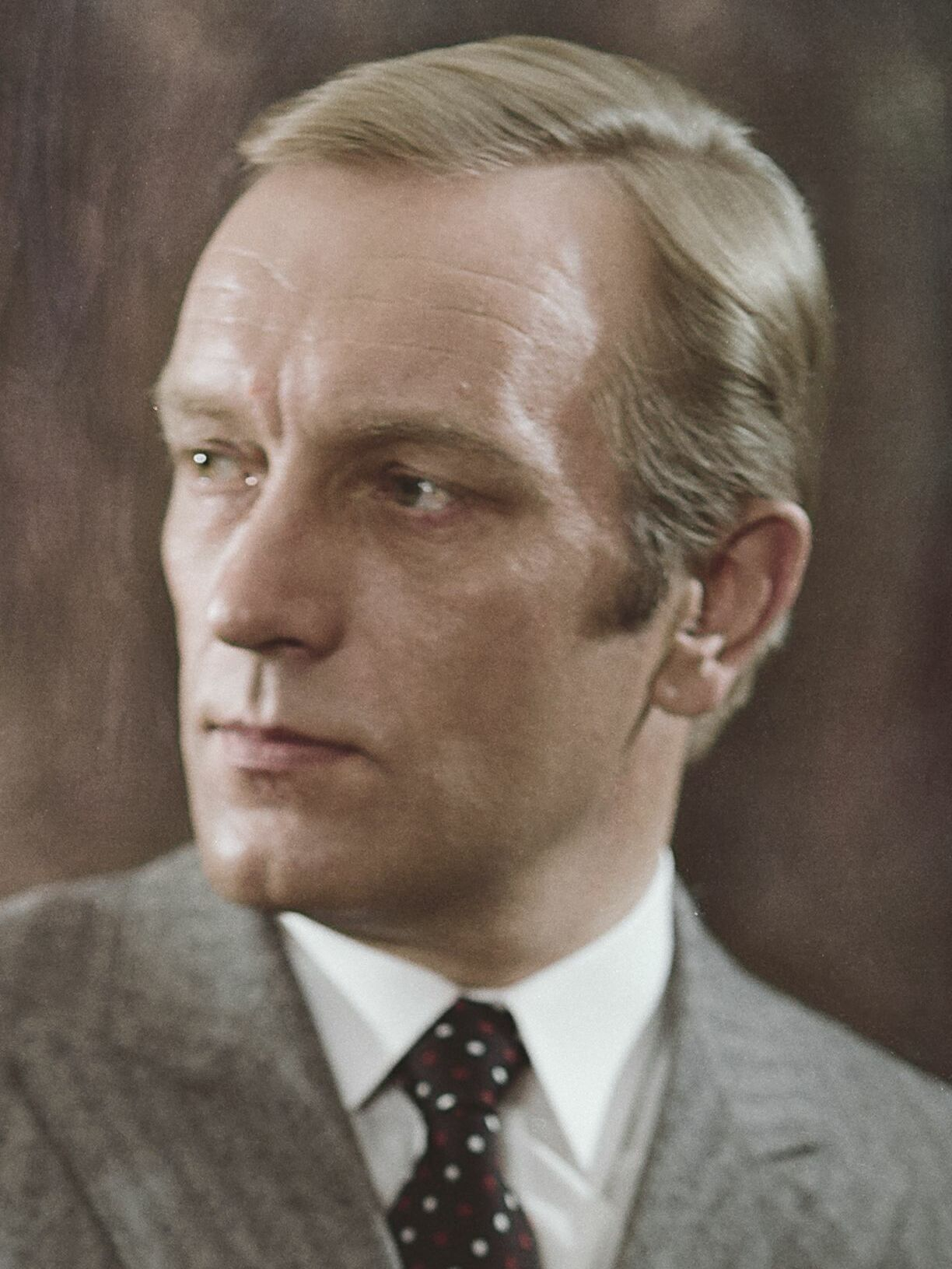

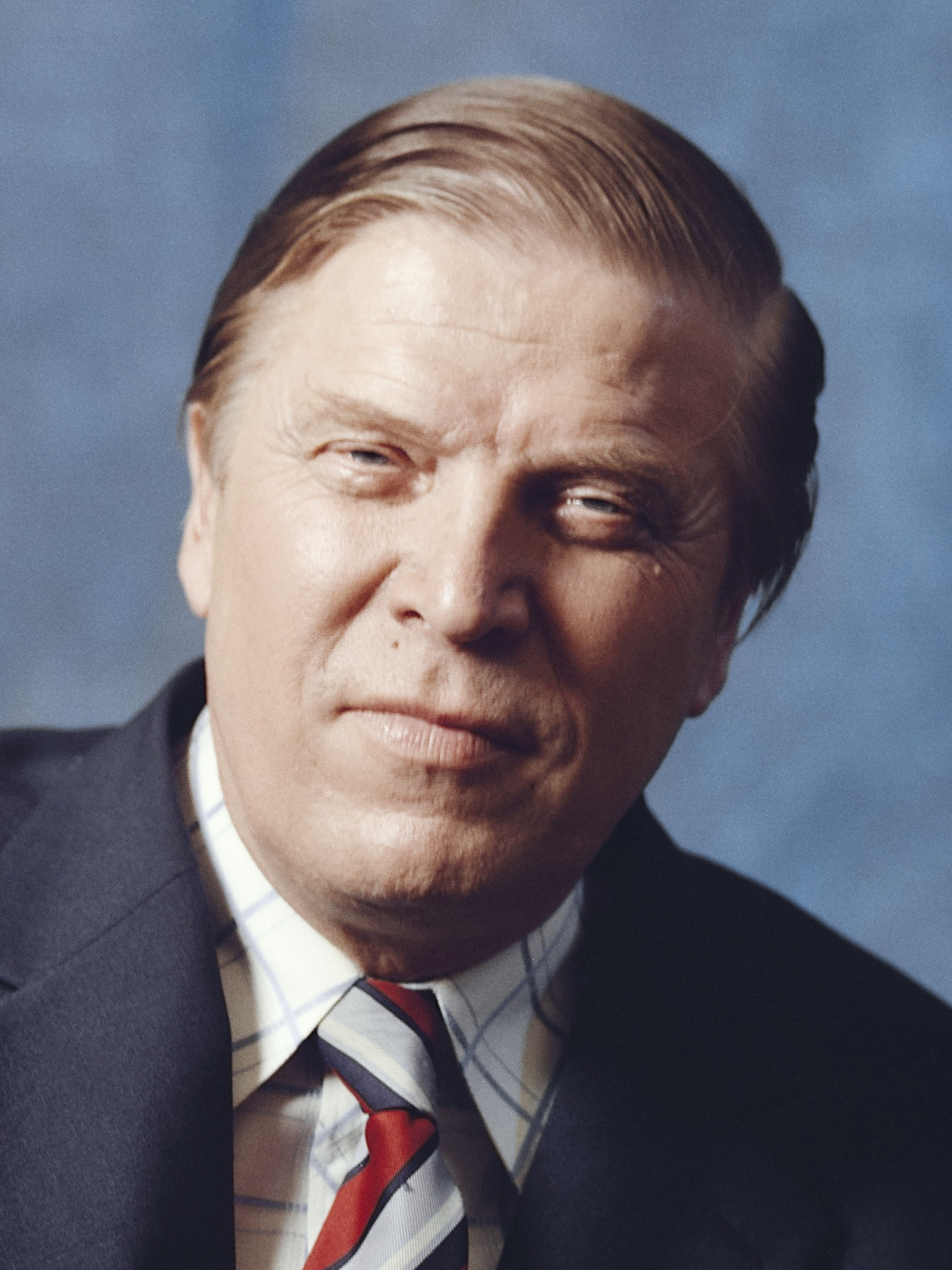

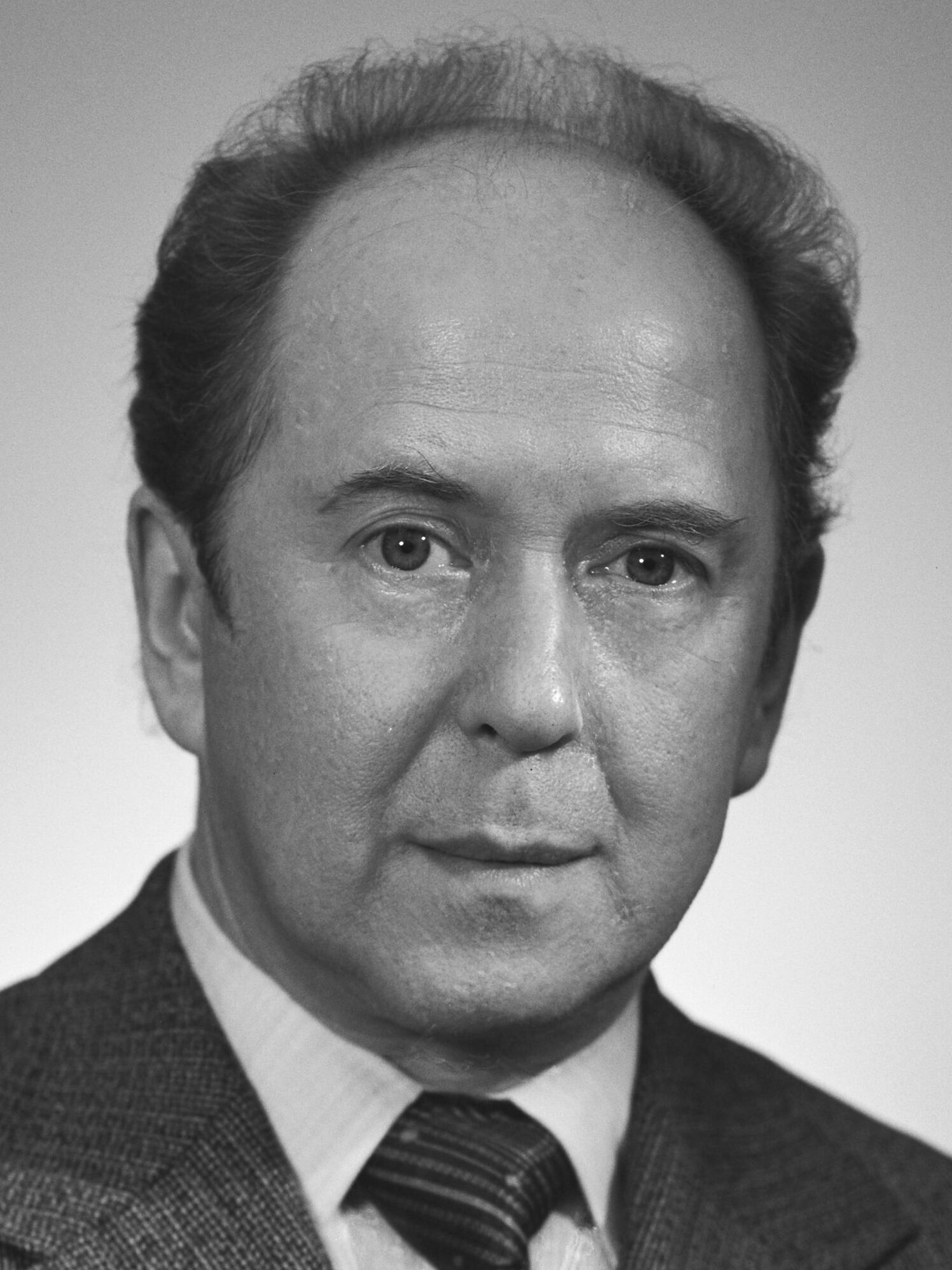

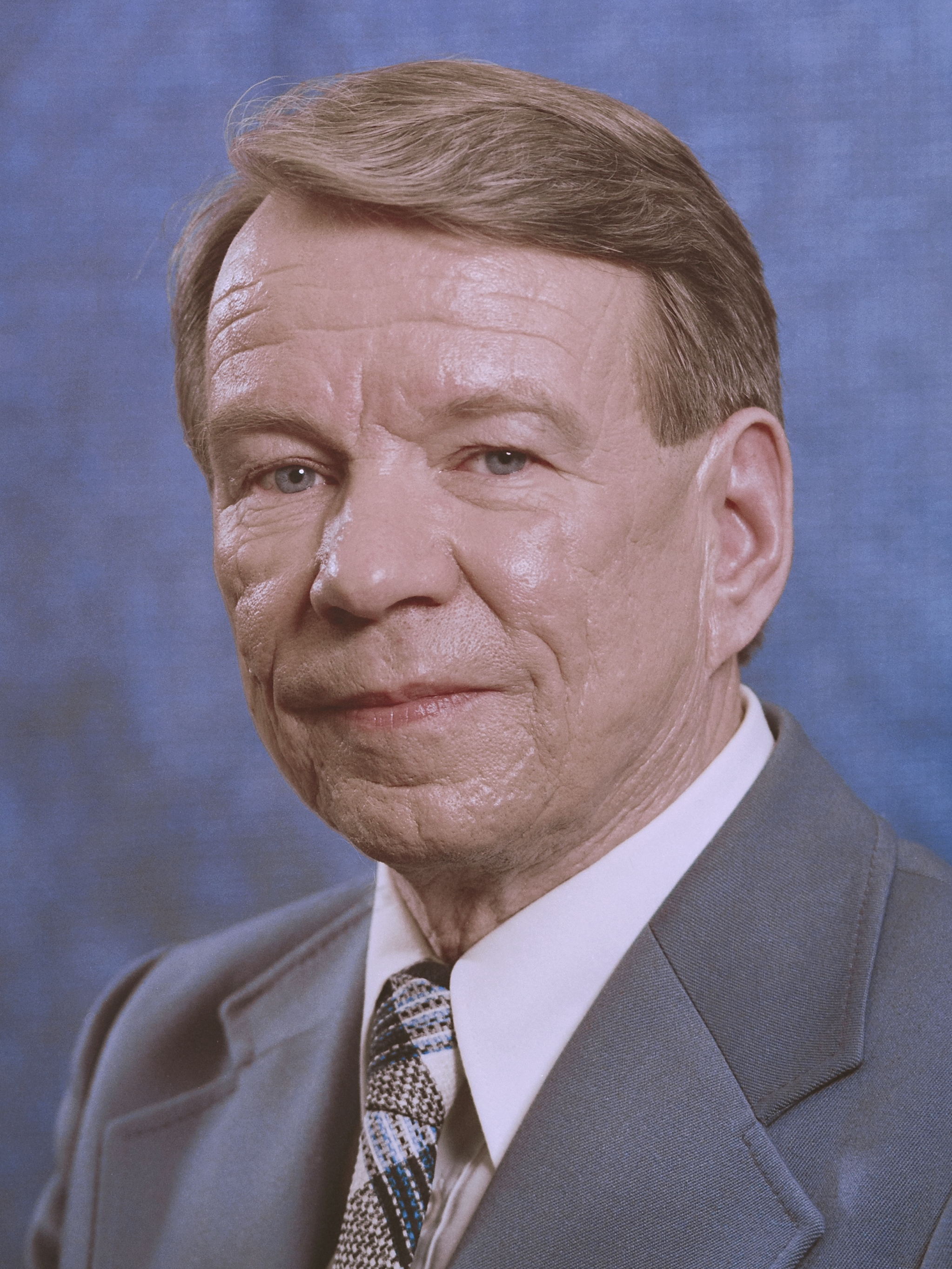

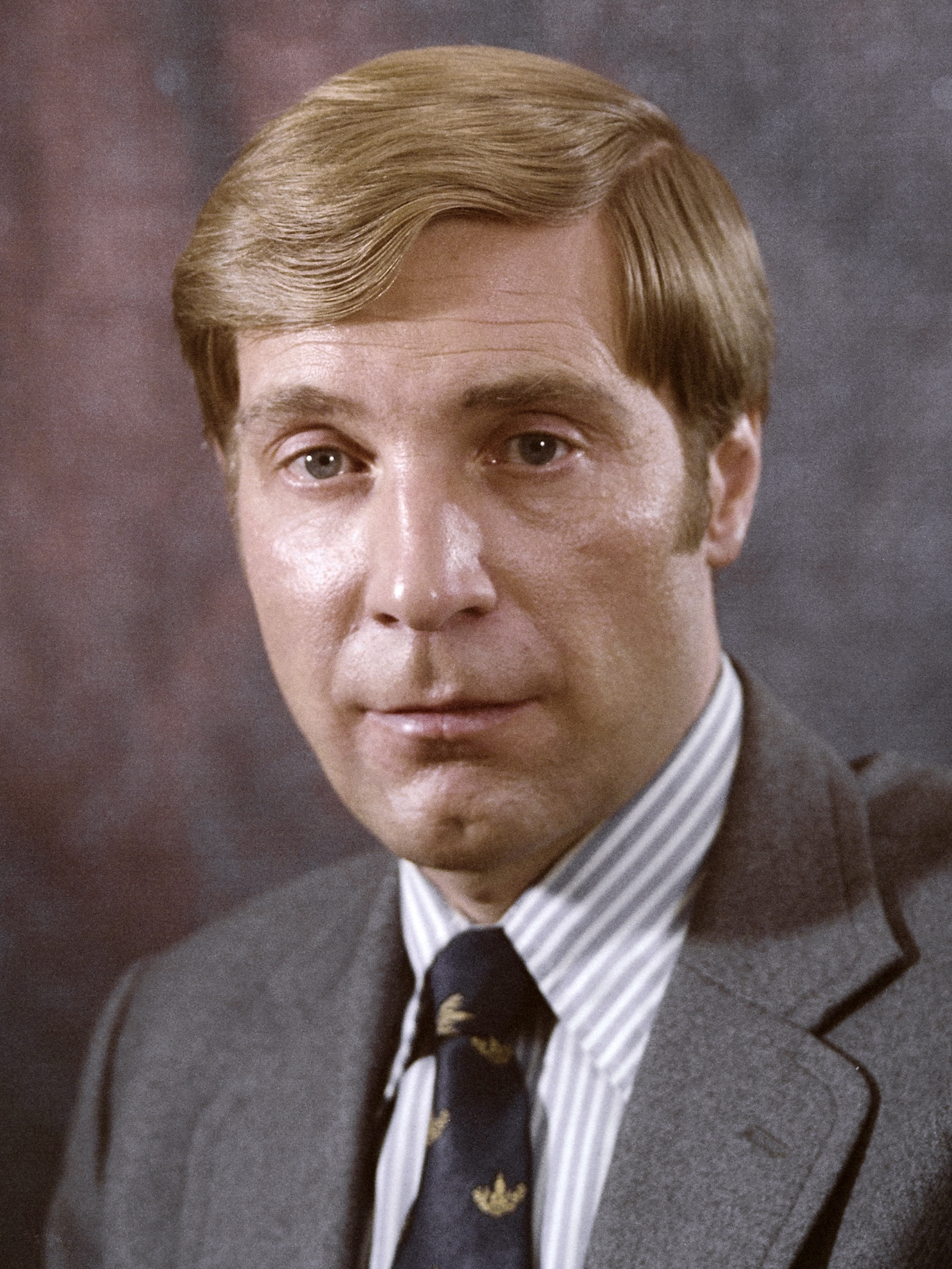

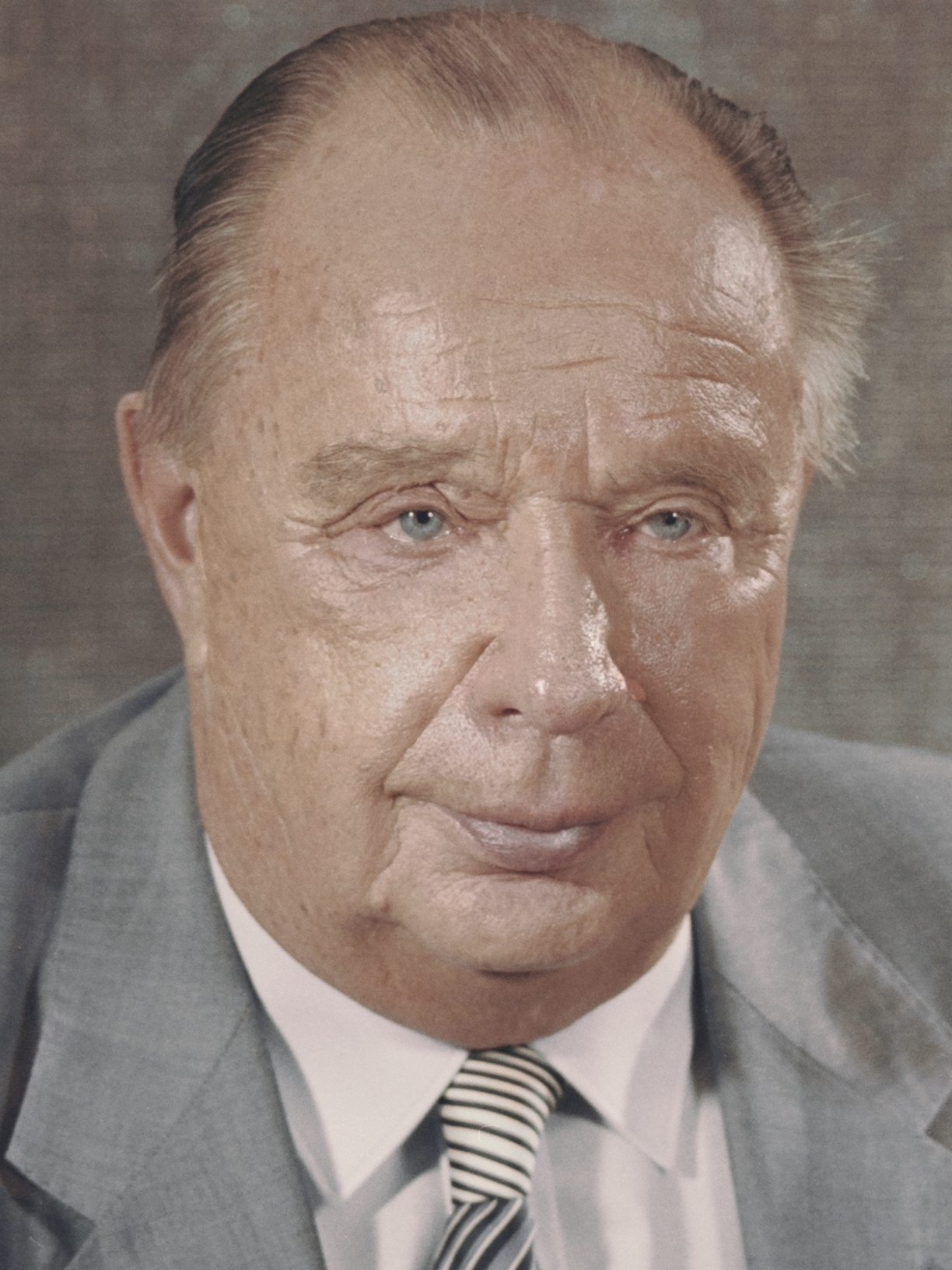

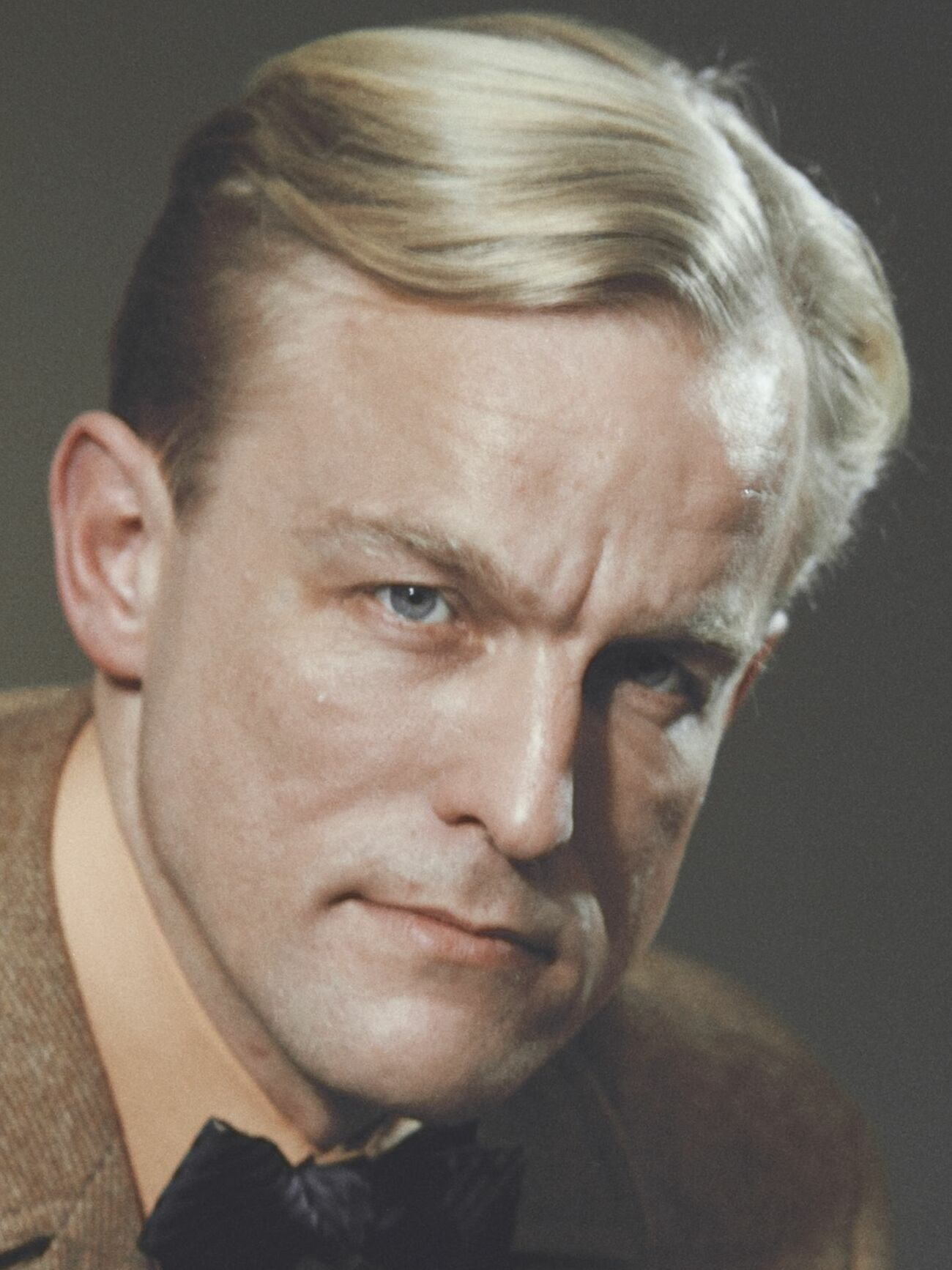
	First party	Second party	Third party
Leader	Kalevi Sorsa	Harri Holkeri	Johannes Virolainen
Party	SDP	National Coalition	Centre
Last election	24.86%, 54 seats	18.37%, 35 seats	17.63%, 39 seats
Seats won	52	47	36
Seat change	▼2	▲12	▼3
Popular vote	691,512	626,764	500,478
Percentage	23.89%	21.65%	17.29%
Swing	▼0.97pp	▲3.28pp	▼0.34pp
	Fourth party	Fifth party	Sixth party
Leader	Ele Alenius	Raino Westerholm	Pär Stenbäck
Party	SKDL	Christian League	RKP
Last election	18.89%, 40 seats	3.29%, 9 seats	4.66%, 9 seats
Seats won	35	9	9
Seat change	▼5	Steady	Steady
Popular vote	518,045	138,244	122,418
Percentage	17.90%	4.78%	4.23%
Swing	▼0.99pp	▲1.49pp	▼0.43pp
	Seventh party	Eighth party
Leader	Veikko Vennamo	Jaakko Itälä
Party	Rural Party	Liberal People's
Last election	3.59%, 2 seats	4.35%, 9 seats
Seats won	7	4
Seat change	▲5	▼5
Popular vote	132,457	106,560
Percentage	4.58%	3.68%
Swing	▲0.99pp	▼0.67pp
Prime Minister before election
Kalevi Sorsa
SDP
Prime Minister after election
Mauno Koivisto
SDP

Parliamentary elections were held in Finland on 18 and 19 March 1979.

== Background ==
Prime Minister Martti Miettunen's centrist minority government (Centre Party, Swedish People's Party and Liberal Party) resigned in May 1977, and Social Democrat Kalevi Sorsa returned to office as Prime Minister after having served two years earlier. He formed a centre-left majority government, which stimulated the economy by deficit spending, tax cuts to businesses and some public works projects. The economy started to grow again in 1978, after a two-year recession; unemployment peaked at 8.5% (about 200,000 unemployed) in 1978 and inflation remained high.

== Results ==
Party	Votes	%	Seats	+/–
Social Democratic Party	691,512	23.89	52	−2
National Coalition Party	626,764	21.65	47	+12
Finnish People's Democratic League	518,045	17.90	35	−5
Centre Party	500,478	17.29	36	−3
Finnish Christian League	138,244	4.78	9	0
Finnish Rural Party	132,457	4.58	7	+5
Swedish People's Party	122,418	4.23	9	0
Liberal People's Party	106,560	3.68	4	−5
Constitutional People's Party	34,958	1.21	0	−1
Finnish People's Unity Party	9,316	0.32	0	−1
Åland Coalition	9,286	0.32	1	0
Socialist Workers Party	2,955	0.10	0	0
Party of Finnish Entrepreneurs	1,233	0.04	0	0
Others	220	0.01	0	–
Total	2,894,446	100.00	200	0
Valid votes	2,894,446	99.60		
Invalid/blank votes	11,620	0.40		
Total votes	2,906,066	100.00		
Registered voters/turnout	3,858,553	75.31		
Source: Tilastokeskus 2004

=== By electoral district ===
Electoral district	Total seats	Seats won								
Electoral district	Total seats	SDP	Kok	Kesk	SKDL	SKL	RKP	SMP	LKP	ÅS
Åland	1									1
Central Finland	10	3	2	2	2	1				
Häme	15	5	5	2	2	1				
Helsinki	20	6	7		3	1	2		1	
Kymi	15	6	3	3	1	1		1		
Lapland	8	1	1	3	3					
North Karelia	7	2	1	2	1			1		
North Savo	11	2	2	4	2			1		
Oulu	17	2	2	6	5			1	1	
Pirkanmaa	13	4	4	1	3	1				
Satakunta	13	3	3	2	3			1	1	
South Savo	9	3	2	2	1	1				
Uusimaa	26	8	7	2	4	1	3		1	
Vaasa	18	3	3	5	2	1	3	1		
Varsinais-Suomi	17	4	5	2	3	1	1	1		
Total	200	52	47	36	35	9	9	7	4	1
Source: Statistics Finland

== Aftermath ==
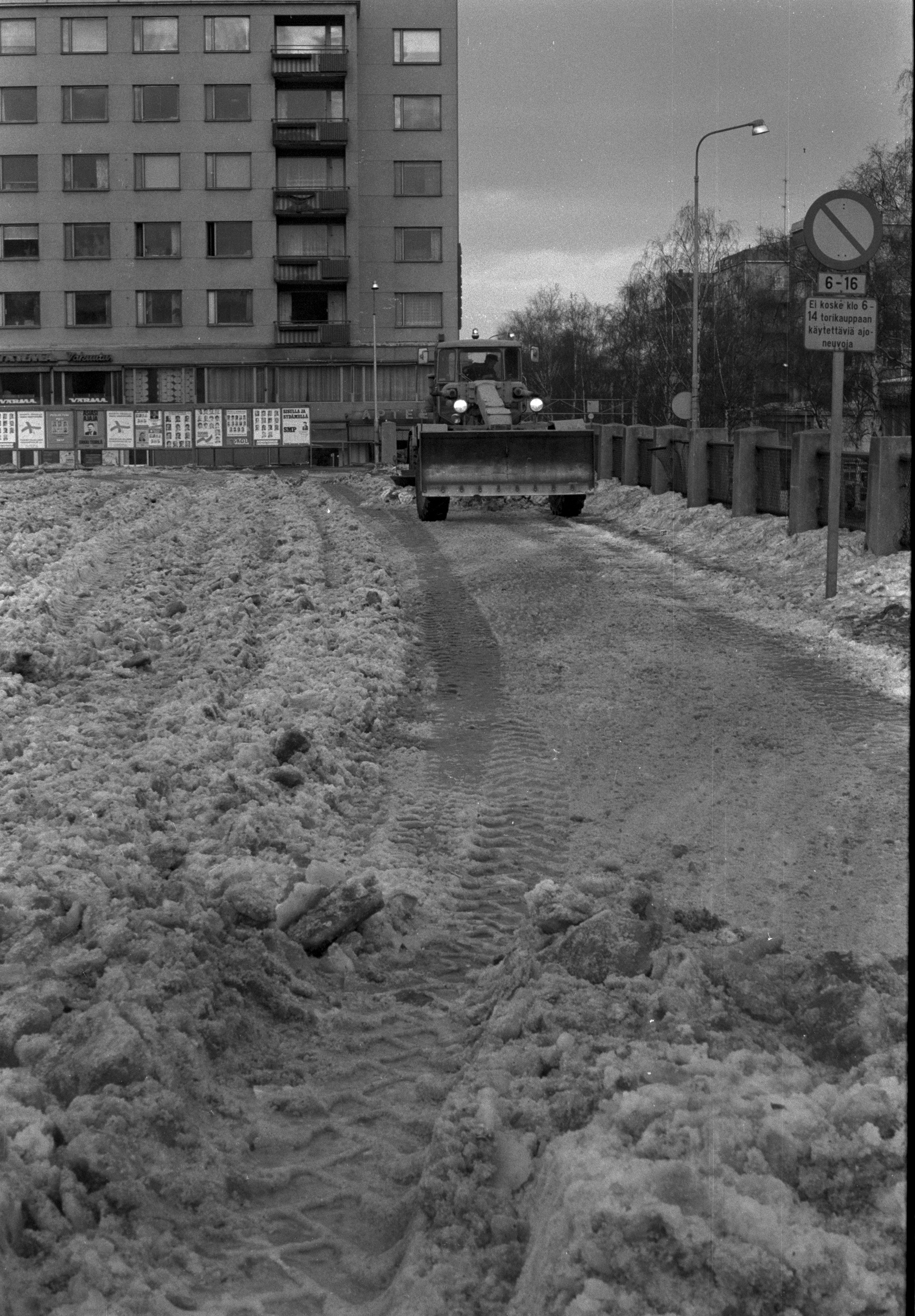
1979 Election ads in Jyväskylä

The National Coalition Party had conducted a vigorous election campaign, demanding to be allowed to re-join the government after thirteen years in the opposition. They reaped the benefits of this campaign, and of the usual decrease of long-time governing parties' support, by picking up twelve seats and becoming the second-largest party. Their leader, Harri Holkeri, negotiated with the various parliamentary parties and concluded in April 1979 that no stable majority centre-right government could be formed, because the traditional bourgeois parties (the Centre Party, the National Coalition Party, the Swedish People's Party and the Liberal People's Party) considered the Finnish Christian League and Finnish Rural Party too ideologically extreme or old-fashioned to become reliable coalition partners. Holkeri declined to form a government, but Sorsa refused to continue as Prime Minister, due to the unpopularity that he had suffered amid the recession's lingering effects, his role in the establishment of the soon-to-be-bankrupt television cathode-ray tube factory Valco, his alleged belittling of family violence in a television interview, and his health problems (back pain).

Trade and Industry Minister Pirkko Työläjärvi refused President Urho Kekkonen's offer to become Prime Minister, because she claimed to be unprepared for such a large task. Kekkonen finally turned to Governor of the Bank of Finland Mauno Koivisto of the Social Democrats, who managed to form a centre-left majority government in late May 1979. The veteran Centrist politician Johannes Virolainen claimed in his memoirs that Kekkonen had appointed Koivisto as Prime Minister on the advice of former Prime Minister Miettunen, who claimed that the Finnish people would then see that Koivisto was not as intelligent as they had believed him to be. Kekkonen's official biographer, historian Juhani Suomi, disagreed, and claimed that Koivisto was Kekkonen's last remaining choice as Prime Minister – unless Kekkonen had intended to appoint a caretaker government. Koivisto's second – and final – government would last, despite frequent internal disagreements (their background was Kekkonen's imminent resignation as President and Koivisto's supreme popularity as his successor), until February 1982.
