= Finnish People's Unity Party =

Former Finnish political party

Finnish People's Unity Party 1972–1982 The League of the Citizens' Power 1982–1983 Suomen Kansan Yhtenäisyyden Puolue 1972-1982 Kansalaisvallan Liitto 1982–1983
- Founded: 1972
- Dissolved: 1983
- Split from: Rural Party of Finland
- Headquarters: Helsinki
- Newspaper: Yhtenäisyys (1973–1981)
- Ideology: Nordic agrarianism Populism
- Political position: Center

Finnish People's Unity Party (Finnish: Suomen Kansan Yhtenäisyyden Puolue, SKYP) was a split from the Rural Party of Finland. The party was formed as some of the members of the parliamentary group of the Rural Party of Finland wanted to support the idea of re-electing the president of Finland Urho Kekkonen without presidential elections for the years 1974–1978. This was impossible for the chairman Veikko Vennamo due to the longstanding disputes between Vennamo and the Centre Party.

The main goal for Urho Kekkonen was to diminish in the Northern Europe then tensions between the Federal Republic of Germany and the German Democratic Republic as well as the reasons between the USA and the Soviet Union. One way of improving the position of the neutrality suspected to have been favourable to the Soviet Union in some of the NATO countries like Germany, UK and USA was to organise CSCE in Helsinki in 1975 which had been prepared in various forms since 1969 in the ministry for foreign affairs of Finland. Kekkonen did not want to have elections where his political opponents could criticize his foreign policies publicly just before CSCE.

Abstaining the criticism was impossible for the Rural Party of Finland as it was based on the criticism of the urbanisation accepted too widely by the Agrarian League and as its chairman Veikko Vennamo had opposed Kekkonen's re-election in 1962 and 1968.

On 8 September 1972, 12 members of the parliamentary group of the Rural Party of Finland walked out from the meeting. They protested against the action taken by the chairman Veikko Vennamo. He had declared, that Mauno Kurppa and Heikki Kainulainen have been sacked from the board of the party and also that MPs Lauri Linna and Artturi Niemelä are temporarily forbidden to take part in the parliamentary work in the parliamentary group of the party. On 24 October 1972, those who had walked out, formed their own parliamentary group, which led to the counter actions. Veikko Vennamo forced the party basic registered societies to oust the members of the new competing parliamentary group or had the registered societies, which refused to oust their member MPs, ousted, In the electoral district Lapland Vennamo had to have all the basic societies ousted as the basic registered societies refused to oust the members of the parliament together.

To ensure the success of the ousted members of the parliaments a revision to the party law of Finland was made with the help of pro-Kekkonen parties and also the MPs ousted from the Rural Party of Finland. According to the revision, the members of the parliament can have the stare party subsidies to the new party in case half or more of the all MPs change the party. In the 1972 general elections, the Rural Party of Finland has had 18 MPs. With the revision of the party law, the economic positions of the 12 MPs was guaranteed for the general elections of the year 1975.

Veikko Vennamo called those who backed the law and had left his party "the banknote spined" (eg. ones who have banknotes in the place of backbone; Finnish: seteliselkärankaiset, also a wordplay on the Finnish term for vertebrates) as a harsh reminder for political corruption with the help of the state parliamentary subsidies.

== Election results ==
Parliament

Year	MPs	Votes	%
1975	1	45 402	1,65%
1979	0	9 316	0,32%
1983	0	2 335	0,08%

Municipal

Year	Councillors	Votes	%
1976	58	12 816	0,5%
1980	12	3 265	0,1%

=== Presidential ===
Year	Candidate	Electors	Votes	
1978	Eino Haikala	--	18 543	0,8%
1982	Raino Westerholm	--	994	0,0%
