= Constitutional Right Party =

Defunct Finnish political party

Constitutional Right Party Perustuslaillinen oikeistopuolue Konstitutionella högerpartiet
- Abbreviation: POP
- Founded: 1973
- Dissolved: 1993
- Headquarters: Helsinki
- Ideology: Anti-communism; Finnish nationalism
- Political position: Right-wing to far-right
- Politics of Finland; Political parties; Elections; A: The POP was considered part of the radical right, a subset of the far-right which does not oppose democracy.

The Constitutional Right Party (Finnish: Perustuslaillinen Oikeistopuolue, Swedish: Konstitutionella högerpartiet), from 1973 to 1980 Constitutional People's Party (Finnish: Perustuslaillinen Kansanpuolue, Swedish: Konstitutionella Folkpartiet). was an anticommunist political party in Finland. The party was founded in 1973 by the parliamentarian Master in Law Georg C. Ehrnrooth as an anticommunist split from the Swedish People's Party (SFP).

The party had around 4,000 members. The party was founded as a response to SFP and the only major right-wing party, National Coalition, backing the re-election of President Urho Kekkonen by emergency law, simply for convenience and despite the lack of any national emergency. Ehrnrooth saw this as a sign of Finlandization, and held that the constitution was being circumvented and the people left out of the process.

== History ==
The party contested the 1975 parliament election, obtaining 1.6% of the national vote and winning one seat. In the 1979 parliament election the party won 1.2% of the votes but no seat. The most seats the party ever held were two (1973–75 and 1986–87), although in both cases, one seat was gained by a defection.

At the 1978 Finnish presidential election, the party supported Ahti Salonen, a social democrat critical of Kekkonen and SDP's support of Kekkonen. At the 1982 election, however, the party supported Mauno Koivisto, in order to ensure Ahti Karjalainen, whom they regarded as too Soviet-friendly, would not succeed as a 'dark horse'.

Constitutional Right Party rallied every 17 July in a big numbers, as Finland got its Republican-based governmental basic rule in that date in 1919.

Although skinheads in Finland were mostly not involved in parliamentary politics, some sought a serious political outlet and joined the youth wing of the POP. Some of the founders of POP included sympathetic radical nationalists (first chairman of POP Ilpo Järvinen was an SS-Company veteran), and the only competitors of the POP were Pekka Siitoin's groups that were unattractive due to their aberrant, illegal conduct.

POP also supported the Afghan mujahideen in their struggle against the Soviet Union, and there was a Mujahideen delegation in the 1986 POP party congress.

After the collapse of POP in 1993, city councillor and POP vice-Chairman Matti Järviharju founded the neo-fascist Patriotic People's Movement (1993). POP splinter "National Culture Front" also patronaged the international neo-Nazi skinhead Blood & Honour.

== Ideology ==
Constitutional Right Party was the only Finnish political party which openly rallied Finland for joining the European Economic Community in 1988.

== Leaders ==
=== Chairmen ===
- Ilpo Järvinen 1973–1974
- Georg C. Ehrnrooth 1974–1992
- Erkki Enberg 1992–1993
- Tapio Väisänen 1993–?

=== Party secretaries ===
- Peter Kankkonen
- Panu Toivonen 1982–1990
- Ulla Bogdanoff 1990–?

=== Vice chairmen ===
- Kullervo Rainio 1978–1980
- Markku Pietikäinen (1.) 1986–?
- Tuula Heiman (2.) 1986–?
- Matti Järviharju 1988–?
- Pentti Taavitsainen 1990–?

== Elections ==
Results
Parliament
Year	MPs	Votes	
1975	1	45 402	1.65%
1979	0	34 958	1.21%
1983	1	11 104	0.37%
1987	0	3 096	0.11%
1991	0	7 599	0.28%
Municipal
Year	Councillors	Votes	
1976	14	23 076	0.86%
1980	8	13 478	0.49%
1984	5	9 858	0.37%
1988	1	4 672	0.18%
1992	1	4 233	0.16%
Presidential
Year	Electoral votes	Popular vote	
1978	6	82 478	3,4 %
