= Toimi Kankaanniemi =

Finnish politician (born 1950)

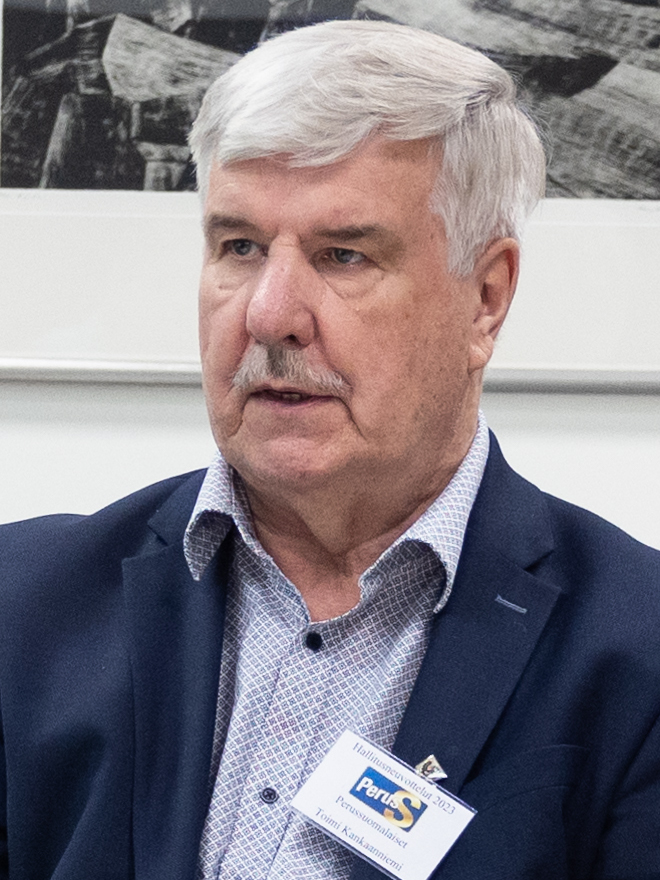

Member of the Finnish Parliament for Central Finland
- Incumbent
- Assumed office 22 April 2015
- In office 21 March 1987 – 19 April 2011

Development minister of Finland
- In office 26 April 1991 – 28 June 1994
- Prime Minister: Esko Aho

Chairman of the Christian Democrats
- In office 1989–1995

Personal details
- Born: February 26, 1950 (age 76) Tyrvää, Pirkanmaa, Finland
- Party: Finns Party (2012—); Christian Democrats (until 2011)
- Education: University of Tampere (1975)

Toimi Olavi Kankaanniemi (born 26 February 1950) is a Finnish politician, born in Tyrvää. Kankaanniemi was the Chairman of the Finnish Christian Democrats from 1989 to 1995. In 1994, he was a candidate for President of Finland, finishing ninth of eleven candidates. He served as a Member of the Finnish Parliament from 1987 to 2011. Kankaanniemi was also a minister in the cabinet of Esko Aho from 1991 to 1994, responsible for international development as well as alcohol issues. He resigned from the cabinet in 1994, citing his opposition to the European Union, which Finland was about to join.

After retiring from the Parliament Kankaanniemi resigned his membership in the Christian Democrats and, in 2012, joined the Finns Party (True Finns) as a candidate in that year's municipal election. He became a member of the Finns Party the following year. He was a candidate in the 2014 European Parliament election, but was not elected.

In the 2015 parliamentary election Kankaanniemi returned to the parliament as a Finns Party MP. After admitting to sending sexually suggestive messages over Facebook to several women, Kankaanniemi was removed from the Finns Party's government negotiation team.

Party political offices
| Preceded by Esko Almgren | Leader of the Christian Democrats; 1989–1995 | Succeeded by Bjarne Kallis |
