= Esko Almgren =

Finnish politician (born 1932)

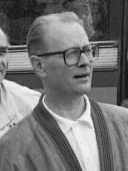
- Almgren in 1987

Chairman of the Christian Democrats
- In office 1982–1989

Personal details
- Born: 2 July 1932 (age 94) Kotka, Finland
- Spouse: Kaarina Wahlroos
- Children: 4
- Education: University of Helsinki
- Profession: High school teacher

Esko Almgren (born 2 July 1932) is a Finnish high school teacher and politician. He was the chairman of the Christian Democrats between 1982 and 1989. He served at the Finnish Parliament for three terms. He is the honorary chairman of the Christian Democrats.

== Early life and education ==
Almgren was born in Kotka on 2 July 1932. He was the seventh child of his parents. He attended the University of Helsinki and received a degree in geography and biology.

== Career ==
After his graduation Almgren worked as a teacher. In 1964 and 1975 he ran for a seat in the provincial elections for the Conservatives. Almgren became a member of the Christian Democrats in 1976. Then he was named as the secretary general of the party. In 1979 he was elected to the Finnish Parliament. In 1982 Almgren became the chairman of the Christian Democrats and held the post until 1989. He was elected to the Parliament in the 1983 and 1988 elections.

== Personal life ==
Almgren married Kaarina Wahlroos, and they had four children.

Party political offices
Preceded by Raino Westerholm	Leader of the Finnish Christian League; 1982–1989	Succeeded by Toimi Kankaanniemi
Preceded by Eino Pinomaa	Secretary General of the Finnish Christian League; 1979–1982	Succeeded by Jouko Jääskeläinen
