= Ajatushautomo Kompassi =

Finnish think tank

Compass Think Tank
- Ajatushautomo Kompassi
- Formation: 2016; 10 years ago
- Type: Think tank
- Legal status: Registered association (ry)
- Location: Helsinki, Finland
- Fields: Christian democracy, public policy, theology
- Chair of the Board: Annika Lyytikäinen
- Director: Tommi Terä
- Affiliations: Christian Democrats; Wilfried Martens Centre for European Studies (associate); Sallux
- Funding: Ministry of Education and Culture (until 2025), private donations
- Website: www.kompassi.org

Ajatushautomo Kompassi (English: "Compass Think Tank") is a Finnish think tank focusing on the research and promotion of Christian democracy. Founded in 2016, it operates close to the Christian Democrats, a political party.

== Activities ==
The purpose of Ajatushautomo Kompassi is to promote social research, discussion and decision-making that develops Finnish society based on Christian democratic values. The association strives to promote human dignity and the overall well-being of people in its activities.

The think tank arranges seminars and has published a number of books. In 2018, Kompassi called for reforming Finland's social security system.

Kompassi is a member of Sallux, the official European political foundation for the European Christian Political Party (ECPP). The think tank is also a partner of the Wilfried Martens Centre for European Studies, the official European political foundation for the European People's Party. Additionally, Kompassi works with other think tanks, both European and international.

The think tank's executive director is Tommi Terä, and the association's board chair is Annika Lyytikäinen.

== Funding ==
In late 2023, the Konrad Adenauer Foundation gave Kompassi a €15,000 grant. In 2024, the think tank had a surplus of €84,0865. Kompassi, like many other think tanks in Finland, received funding from the Ministry of Education and Culture, receiving a €14,000 grant in 2018. The Ministry of Education and Culture's funding was discontinued on 1 January 2025.

== See also ==
- Center for Public Justice
