= Jouko Jääskeläinen =

Finland politician (born 1952)

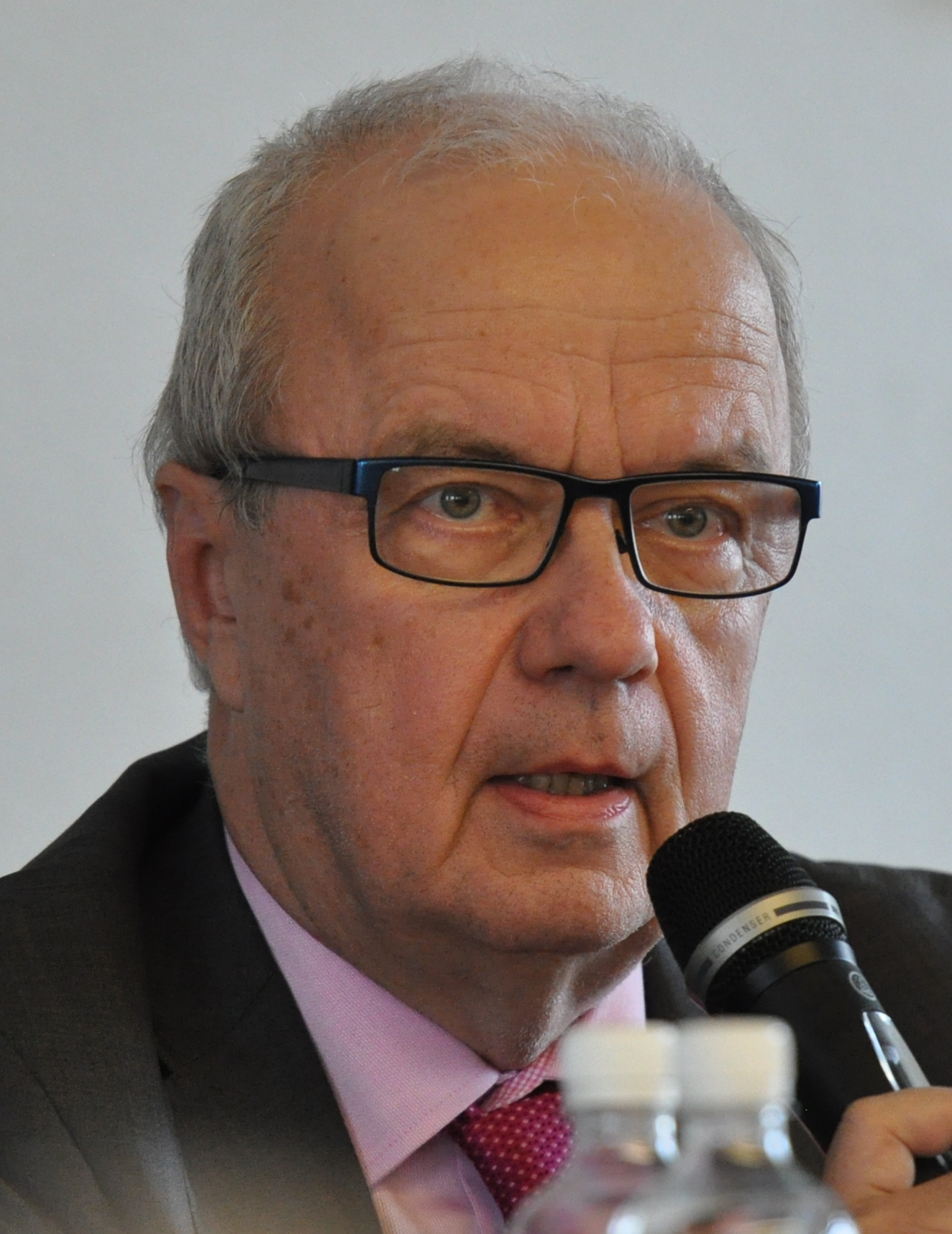

Member of the Parliament of Finland
- In office April 20, 2011 – April 21, 2015
- In office March 22, 1991 – March 18, 2003

Secretary of the Christian Democrats
- In office 1983–1996

Personal details
- Born: Jouko Tapani Jääskeläinen; March 18, 1952 (age 74) Anjala, Finland
- Party: Christian Democrats
- Spouse: Ritva Eeva Irmeli Siitonen
- Children: Milka; Suvi; Juho
- Education: University of Tampere; University of Helsinki

Jouko Jääskeläinen (born March 18, 1952) is a Finnish politician representing the Christian Democrats.

== Career ==
Jääskeläinen was a Member of Parliament from 1991 to 2003 and from 2011 to 2015. During that time, he was Chairman of the Christian Democratic Parliamentary Group from 1997 to 2003. From 2011 to 2015 Jääskeläinen was a member of the Finance Committee, the Tax Subcommittee, the Housing and Environment Subcommittee, the Committee for the Future and the Inter Parliamentary Union, Finnish Group. Previously, he was a member of the Committee for Labour Affairs, the Environment Committee, the Commerce Committee, the Grand Committee, the Defence Committee, the Legal Affairs Committee, the Constitutional Law Committee, the Education and Culture Committee, the Finnish Delegation to the Nordic Council and the Advisory Council of the Finnish Institute of International Affairs.

Additionally, Jääskeläinen has been a district executive of the Helsinki Lutheran Mission and Financial Director of the Finnish Lutheran Mission.

Party political offices
Preceded by Esko Almgren	Secretary General of the Finnish Christian League; 1982–1996	Succeeded by Milla Kalliomaa
