= Artturi Niemelä =

Finnish politician (1923–2021)

Artturi Antero Niemelä (23 August 1923 – 11 April 2021) was a Finnish homesteader and politician. He was a member of the Parliament of Finland, representing the Finnish Rural Party (SMP) from 1970 to 1972 and the Finnish People's Unity Party (SKYP) from 1972 to 1975. He was born in Kemijärvi. He died in April 2021 at the age of 97.
