= Heikki Kainulainen =

Finnish politician (1917–2005)

Heikki Olavi Kainulainen (21 April 1917, in Virolahti – 19 February 2005) was a Finnish farmer and politician. He was a member of the Parliament of Finland, representing the Finnish Rural Party (SMP) from 1970 to 1972 and the Finnish People's Unity Party (SKYP) from 1972 to 1975. He served as an officer in the Finnish Defence Forces from 1940 to 1944.
