= Christian Democratic Youth of Finland =

Political youth organization in Finland

Christian Democratic Youth of Finland Suomen Kristillisdemokraattiset Nuoret
- President: Ami Rinta-Valkama
- Secretary General: Tommi Terä
- Founded: 1971; 55 years ago
- Headquarters: Karjalankatu 2 A, 00520 Helsinki
- Membership: 1500
- Mother party: Christian Democrats
- Nordic affiliation: Kristendemokratisk Ungdom i Norden (KDUN)
- Magazine: Arvosana
- Website: https://kdnuoret.fi

Christian Democratic Youth of Finland (Finnish: Suomen Kristillisdemokraattiset Nuoret, KDN / Swedish: Finlands Kristdemokratiska Unga) is a political youth organization in Finland. It is the youth league of Christian Democrats. It currently has more than 1,500 registered members. It has been chaired by Aki Ruotsala since November 2010 until December 2012. From January 2013 Lauri Kangasniemi leads the organization.

Kristillisdemokraattiset Nuoret is a member of the Youth of the European People's Party, youth organization of European Parliaments largest political group.

== Political viewpoints ==
Traditionally Christian Democratic Youth of Finland has supported a more moderate conservative ideology than its political concern, the Christian Democrat Party of Finland. Furthermore the Youth division of the party represents the most liberal wing of its party. Its political ideology is founded on three principles:

- Liberty as basic pillar of human action and as a requirement sine qua non for human action.
- Subsidiarity as social organization rule. Subsidiarity principle states that superior social institutions - such as the State or the European Union - should not take care of activities that lower social layers - such as individuals, families, clubs, companies, etc. - can manage efficiently.
- Charity, meaning that, although individuals are the basic cell of the society, they all life in society and so, they have rights and responsibilities in their communities. Although most of this rights and responsibilities should be exercised personally, the State should avoid making their fulfillment harder or fulfilling those duties on behalf of individuals that could exercise them personally.
