= Peter Östman =

Finnish politician

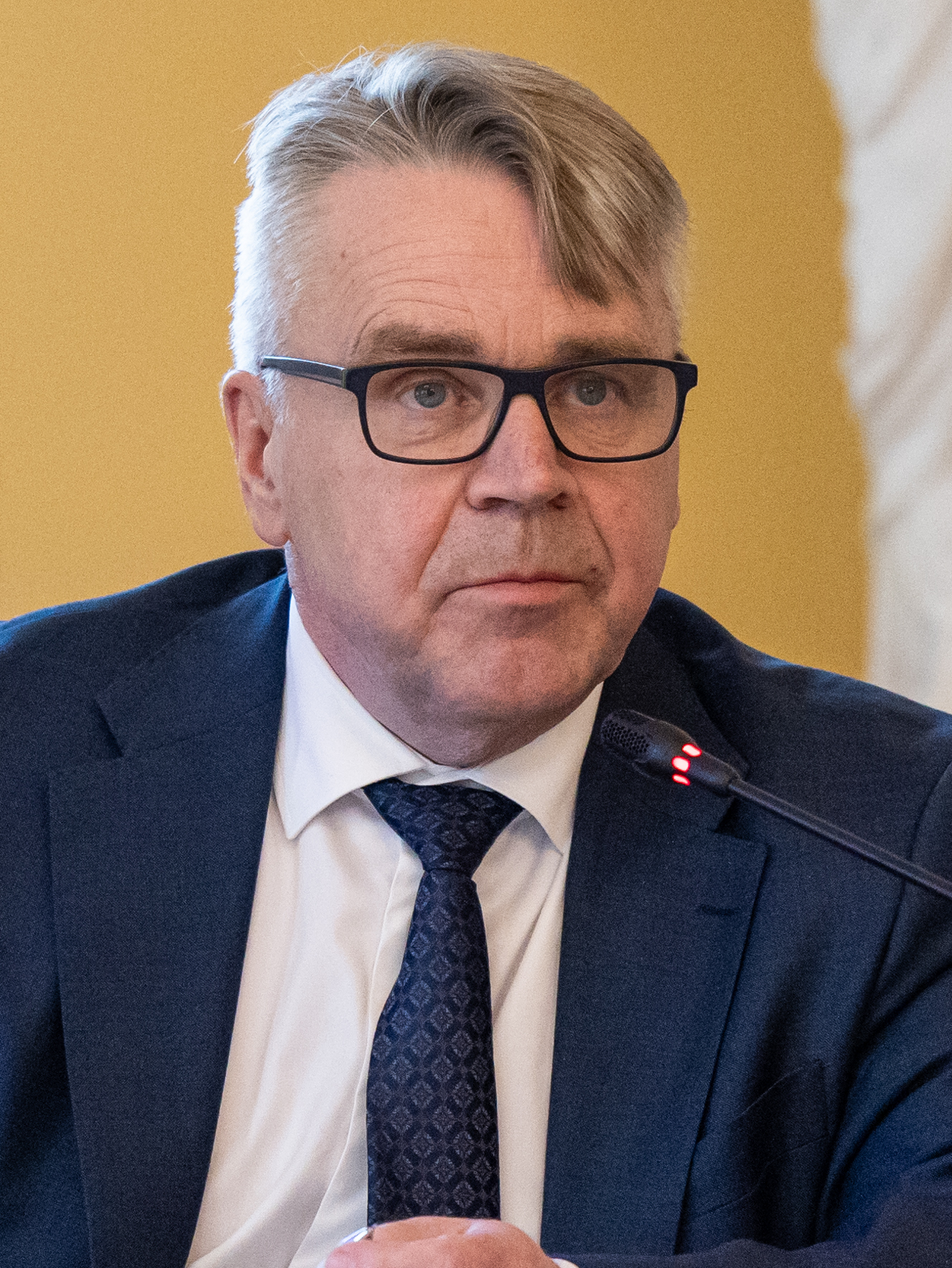
- Peter Östman in 2024.

Member of the Parliament of Finland
- Incumbent
- Assumed office April 20, 2011

Secretary General of the Christian Democrats
- In office 2009–2011

Vice Chairman of the Christian Democrats
- In office 2004–2009

Personal details
- Born: Peter Johan Östman; December 16, 1961 (age 63); Larsmo, Ostrobothnia, Finland
- Political party: Christian Democrats
- Spouse: Katarina Östman
- Children: Rasmus; Sebastian

Peter Johan Östman (born 16 December 1961) is a member of the Parliament of Finland and is the Chairman of the Christian Democratic Parliamentary Group.

== Early life ==
Ostman was born in 1961 in Larsmo, Ostrobothnia. His family comes from Larsmo and Kronoby.

== Career ==
Östman has been a Member of Parliament representing the Constituency of Vaasa since 2011. He is a member of the Grand Committee, the Working Subcommittee of the Grand Committee, the Legal Affairs Committee and the Finnish Delegation to the Nordic Council. Previously, he was a member of the Finance Committee and the Agriculture and Forestry Committee. He has also been Secretary General and Vice Chairman of the Christian Democrats. In 2004, he was a candidate for the Chair of the Christian Democrats, losing to Päivi Räsänen.

Östman supports the maintenance of Larsmo's bilingual status. His candidacy to become the vice chair of the party was supported by the Christian Democrats' Swedish-speaking organization.

Ostman supports a ban on swastikas in Finland and has voiced concern over the status of antisemitism in Finland. He has also pressured the Finnish government to outlaw Holocaust denial.

Party political offices
Preceded by Sari Essayah	Secretary General of the Christian Democrats; 2009–2011	Succeeded by Asmo Maanselkä
