= Christian Democrats (Finland) =

Finnish political party

Christian Democrats Suomen Kristillisdemokraatit (Finnish) Kristdemokraterna i Finland (Swedish)
- Abbreviation: KD
- Chairperson: Sari Essayah
- Secretary: Mikko Rekimies
- Parliamentary group leader: Peter Östman
- First deputy chair: Mika Poutala
- Chair of the party council: Riitta Kuismanen
- Founded: 6 May 1958
- Split from: National Coalition Party
- Headquarters: Karjalankatu 2A; 00520, Helsinki
- Newspaper: KD-lehti
- Think tank: Ajatushautomo Kompassi
- Youth wing: Christian Democratic Youth of Finland
- Women's wing: Christian Democratic Women of Finland
- Swedish-speaking wing: KD Svenska
- Membership (2021): ▼8,370
- Ideology: Christian democracy Social conservatism
- Political position: Centre-right
- Religion: Christianity
- European affiliation: European People's Party
- European Parliament group: European People's Party Group
- Nordic affiliation: Centre Group
- Colors: Blue; White; Light blue Orange
- Eduskunta: 5 / 200
- European Parliament: 0 / 15
- Municipalities: 299 / 8,586
- County seats: 62 / 1,379

Website
- kd.fi

The Christian Democrats (Finnish: Suomen Kristillisdemokraatit; Swedish: Kristdemokraterna i Finland, KD) is a Christian democratic and social conservative political party in Finland.

It was founded in May 1958, chiefly by the Christian faction of the National Coalition Party. It entered parliament in 1970. The party leader since 28 August 2015 has been Sari Essayah. The Christian Democrats have five seats in the Finnish Parliament. It is positioned on the centre-right on the political spectrum.

The party name was for a long time abbreviated to SKL (standing for Suomen Kristillinen Liitto, Finlands Kristliga Förbund, Finland's Christian League), until 2001, when the party changed its name to the current Christian Democrats and its Finnish and Swedish abbreviations to KD. The CD was a minor party in the centre-right coalition government led by Prime Minister Esko Aho between 1991 and 1994 and was later a part of a rainbow coalition led by Jyrki Katainen and Alexander Stubb between 2011–2015. It has been a part of the Orpo Cabinet since its formation on 20 June 2023. KD-lehti is the party's weekly newspaper. The party is a member of the European People's Party and the European People's Party Group.

== History ==
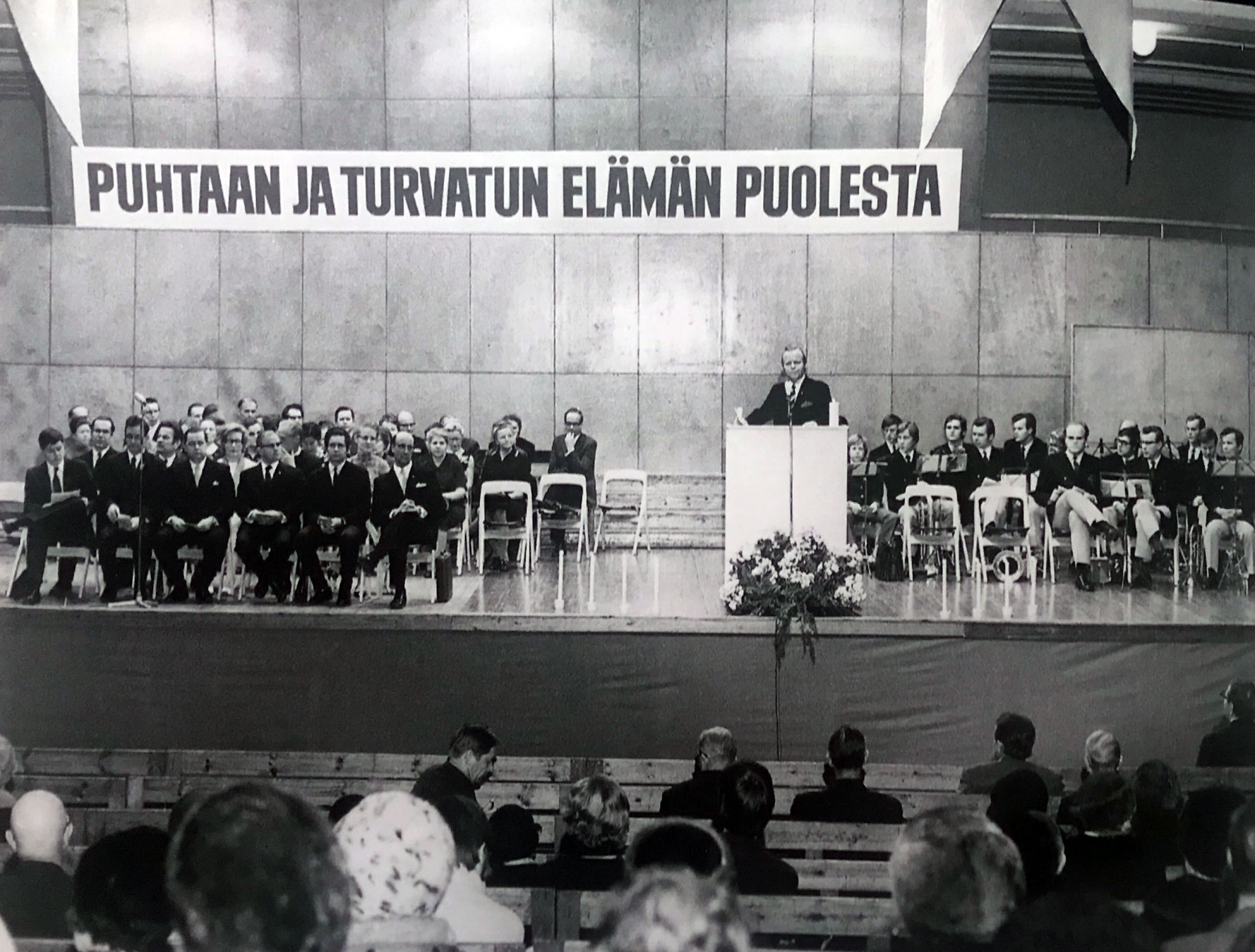
1972 Finnish parliamentary election campaign event of the Finnish Christian League in 1971

The Christian Democrats were founded in May 1958 under the name Finnish Christian League. At the time, the communist-dominated Finnish People's Democratic League was polling about 25 per cent and became the largest parliamentary grouping. That, together with lax alcohol laws, salacious publications and assistance from the Norwegian KrF, sparked the Christian initiative.

The 1960s were an 'incubation period', but there was a growing conviction of the need for parliamentary seats in the wake of liberal legislation. At the 'earthquake election' of 1970, after four years of a popular front government, the CD only had Raino Westerholm elected. Westerholm was a party chair between 1973 and 1982. Westerholm polled a creditable 8.8 per cent at the 1978 presidential election. The modest 'Westerholm effect' was a backlash for long-serving Urho Kekkonen, who was backed by all of the larger parties.

The party was a junior coalition partner in government from 1991 to 1995, when it occupied the development aid portfolio. It was a soft Eurosceptic party and stressed the importance of the principle of subsidiarity in European affairs. After being renamed to "The Christian Democrats" in 2001, it moved to a pro-European stance. Bjarne Kallis, the party chairman between 1995 and 2004, was instrumental in the party's change of name and concern to attract a wider electorate, being able to draw votes from the Swedish People's Party and Finnish-speaking conservative and centrist voters.

At the 2003 general election, the Christian Democrats polled its highest vote of 5.3%.

English-speaking members of the party founded their own chapter in Helsinki in 2004. Its monthly meetings attract immigrants to participate in societal matters and the issues that are particularly important to them. In 2005, a Russian-speaking chapter was also founded in Helsinki, Finland.

== Ideology ==
The party describes itself as following the tenets of Christian democracy. It has been described by third-party sources as conservative. It is also orientated towards socially conservative policies. It emphasizes "respect of human dignity, the importance of family and close communities, defending the weak, encouraging resourcefulness and individual and collective responsibility, not just for themselves but also for their neighbours and the rest of God's creations". Membership is open to everyone who agrees with their values and aims. The party also states it is committed to protecting the environment.

== Organization ==
=== Leadership ===
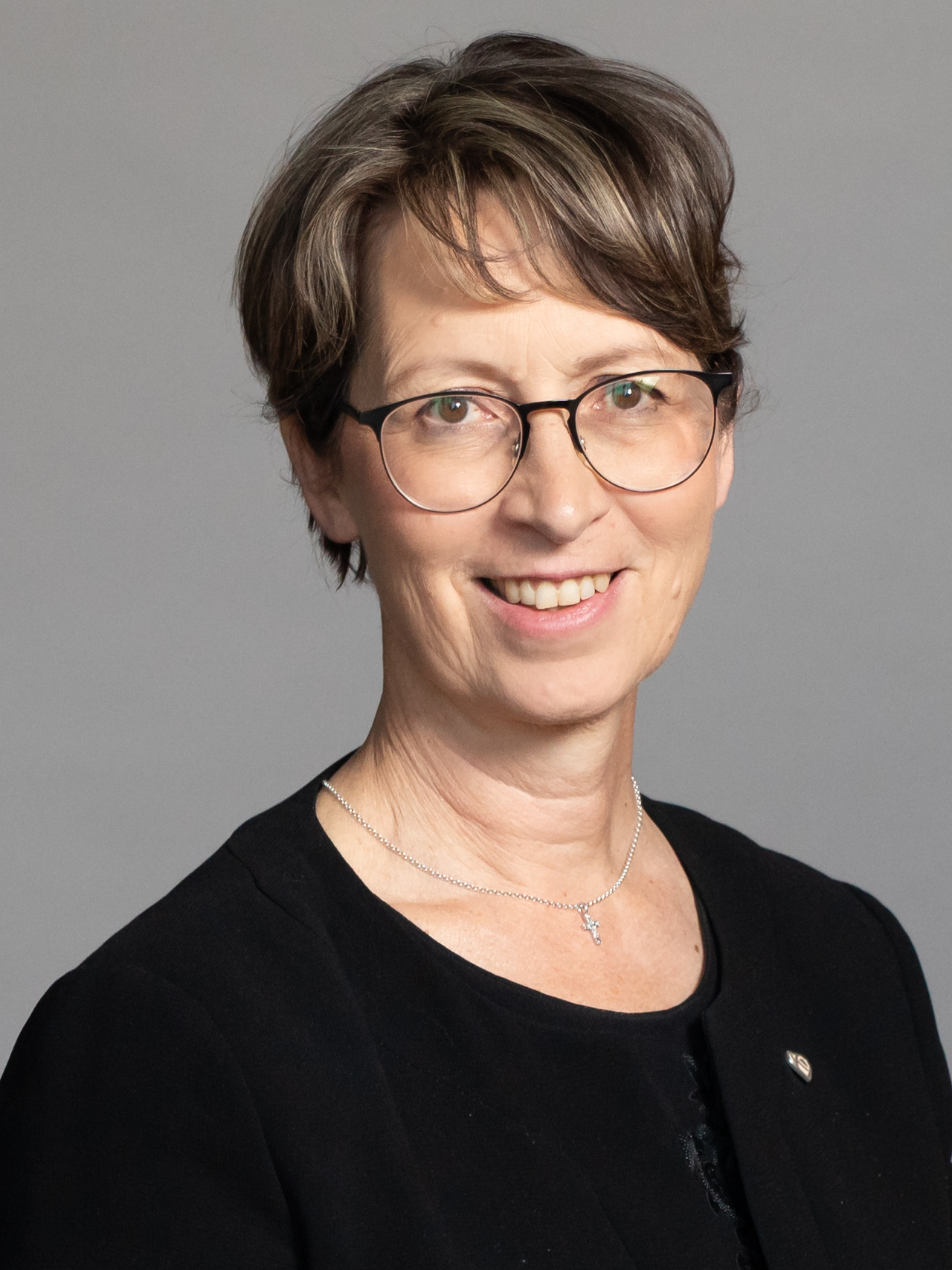
Sari Essayah has been the leader of the Christian Democrats since 2015.

==== Party chairs ====
- Olavi Päivänsalo (1958–1964)
- Ahti Tele (1964–1967)
- Eino Sares (1967–1970)
- Olavi Majlander (1970–1973)
- Raino Westerholm (1973–1982)
- Esko Almgren (1982–1989)
- Toimi Kankaanniemi (1989–1995)
- Bjarne Kallis (1995–2004)
- Päivi Räsänen (2004–2015)
- Sari Essayah (2015–present)

==== First deputy chairs ====
- Raino Westerholm (1971–1973)
- Ilmari Helimäki (1973–1982)
- Olavi Ronkainen (1982–1985)
- Marjatta Laakko (1985–1989)
- Juhani Peltonen (1989–1991)
- Leea Hiltunen (1991–2003)
- Marja-Leena Kemppainen (2003–2005)
- Peter Östman (2005–2009)
- Sari Palm (2009–2011)
- Teuvo V. Riikonen (2011–2013)
- Sauli Ahvenjärvi (2013–2015)
- Tommy Björkskog (2015–2017)
- Tiina Tuomela (2017–2019)
- Peter Östman (2019–2023)
- Mika Poutala (2023–present)

==== Party secretaries ====
- 1958–1959: S. N. Venho
- 1959–1965: Paavo Luostarinen
- 1965–1978: Eino Pinomaa
- 1979–1982: Esko Almgren
- 1982–1996: Jouko Jääskeläinen
- 1997–2002: Milla Kalliomaa
- 2003: Eija-Riitta Korhola
- 2003–2007: Annika Kokko
- 2007–2009: Sari Essayah
- 2009–2011: Peter Östman
- 2011–2021: Asmo Maanselkä
- 2022–2023: Elsi Juupaluoma
- 2024– Mikko Rekimies

=== Representatives ===
==== Current members of parliament ====
- Sari Essayah (Savo-Karjala constituency)
- Mika Poutala (Uusimaa constituency)
- Päivi Räsänen (Häme constituency)
- Sari Tanus (Pirkanmaa constituency)
- Peter Östman (Vaasa constituency)

==== Members of the European Parliament ====
Sari Essayah was the most recent MEP of the party; she was elected to the European Parliament in the 2009 election but failed to win re-election in 2014.

=== Affiliated organisations ===
- Christian Democratic Youth of Finland (Finnish: Suomen Kristillisdemokraattiset Nuoret Swedish: Finlands Kristdemokratiska Unga)
- Christian Democratic Women of Finland (Finnish: Suomen Kristillisdemokraattiset Naiset Swedish: Finlands Kristdemokratiska Kvinnor)
- KD-Lehti
- Ajatushautomo Kompassi

== Election results ==
=== Parliamentary elections ===
Election	Votes	%	Seats	+/-	Government
1958	3,358	0.17	0 / 200		Extra-parliamentary
1966	10,646	0.45	0 / 200	Steady	Extra-parliamentary
1970	28,228	1.40	1 / 200	▲1	Opposition
1972	65,228	2.53	4 / 200	▲3	Opposition
1975	90,599	3.29	9 / 200	▲5	Opposition
1979	138,244	4.77	9 / 200	Steady	Opposition
1983	90,410	3.03	3 / 200	▼6	Opposition
1987	74,209	2.58	5 / 200	▲2	Opposition
1991	83,151	3.05	8 / 200	▲3	Coalition
1995	82,311	2.96	7 / 200	▼1	Opposition
1999	111,835	4.17	10 / 200	▲3	Opposition
2003	148,987	5.34	7 / 200	▼3	Opposition
2007	134,643	4.86	7 / 200	Steady	Opposition
2011	118,453	4.03	6 / 200	▼1	Coalition
2015	105,134	3.54	5 / 200	▼1	Opposition
2019	120,144	3.90	5 / 200	Steady	Opposition
2023	130,394	4.22	5 / 200	Steady	Coalition

=== Municipal elections ===
Election	Councillors	Votes	%
1972	134	49,877	2.0
1976	322	85,792	3.2
1980	333	100,800	3.7
1984	257	80,455	3.0
1988	273	71,614	2.7
1992	353	84,481	3.2
1996	353	75,494	3.2
2000	443	95,009	4.3
2004	392	94,666	4.0
2008	351	106,639	4.2
2012	300	93,257	3.7
2017	316	105,551	4.1
2021	311	88,259	3.6
2025	299	86,428	3.6

=== European Parliament elections ===
Election	Votes	%	Seats	+/–	EP Group
1996	63,134	2.81 (#8)	0 / 16	New	–
1999	29,637	2.39 (#7)	1 / 16	▲1	EPP-ED
2004	70,845	4.28 (#7)	0 / 14	▼1	–
2009	69,467	4.17 (#8)	1 / 13	▲1	EPP
2014	90,586	5.24 (#8)	0 / 13	▼1	–
2019	89,204	4.87 (#8)	0 / 13	0	–
2024	75,426	4.12 (#8)	0 / 15	0	–

=== Presidential elections ===
==== Indirect elections ====
Electoral college
Election	Candidate	Popular vote			First ballot		Second ballot		Third ballot		Results
Election	Candidate	Votes	%	Seats	Votes	%	Votes	%	Votes	%	Results
1978	Raino Westerholm	215,244	8.8	24 / 300	24 / 300	8.8 (#2)					Lost
1982	Raino Westerholm	59,885	1.9	0 / 300	0 / 300	1.9 (#7)					Lost

==== Direct elections ====
Election	Candidate	1st round		2nd round		Result
Election	Candidate	Votes	%	Votes	%	Result
1994	Toimi Kankaanniemi	31,453	1.0			Lost
2006	Bjarne Kallis	61,483	2.0			Lost
2012	Sari Essayah	75,744	2.5			Lost
2018	Supported Sauli Niinistö	1,874,334	62.6			Won
2024	Sari Essayah	47,820	1.48			Lost

== Literature ==
- Erävalo, Esa (2018). Yhteinen hyvä. Johdatus kristillisdemokratiaan. Kompassi Think Tank. ISBN 978-952-7289-03-7.
- Vakaumuksena välittäminen - Med hjärta i politiken. SKL 1958 / 2008 KD. KD-Mediat Oy. 2008. ISBN 978-952-67038-0-0.

== See also ==
- Politics of Finland
- Finnish Government
- Parliament of Finland
- Elections in Finland
- List of political parties in Finland
- European People's Party
- Christian Democrats – similar party in Sweden
- Christian Democratic Party – similar party in Norway
