= 1978 Finnish presidential election =

← 1968	15–16 January 1978	1982 →
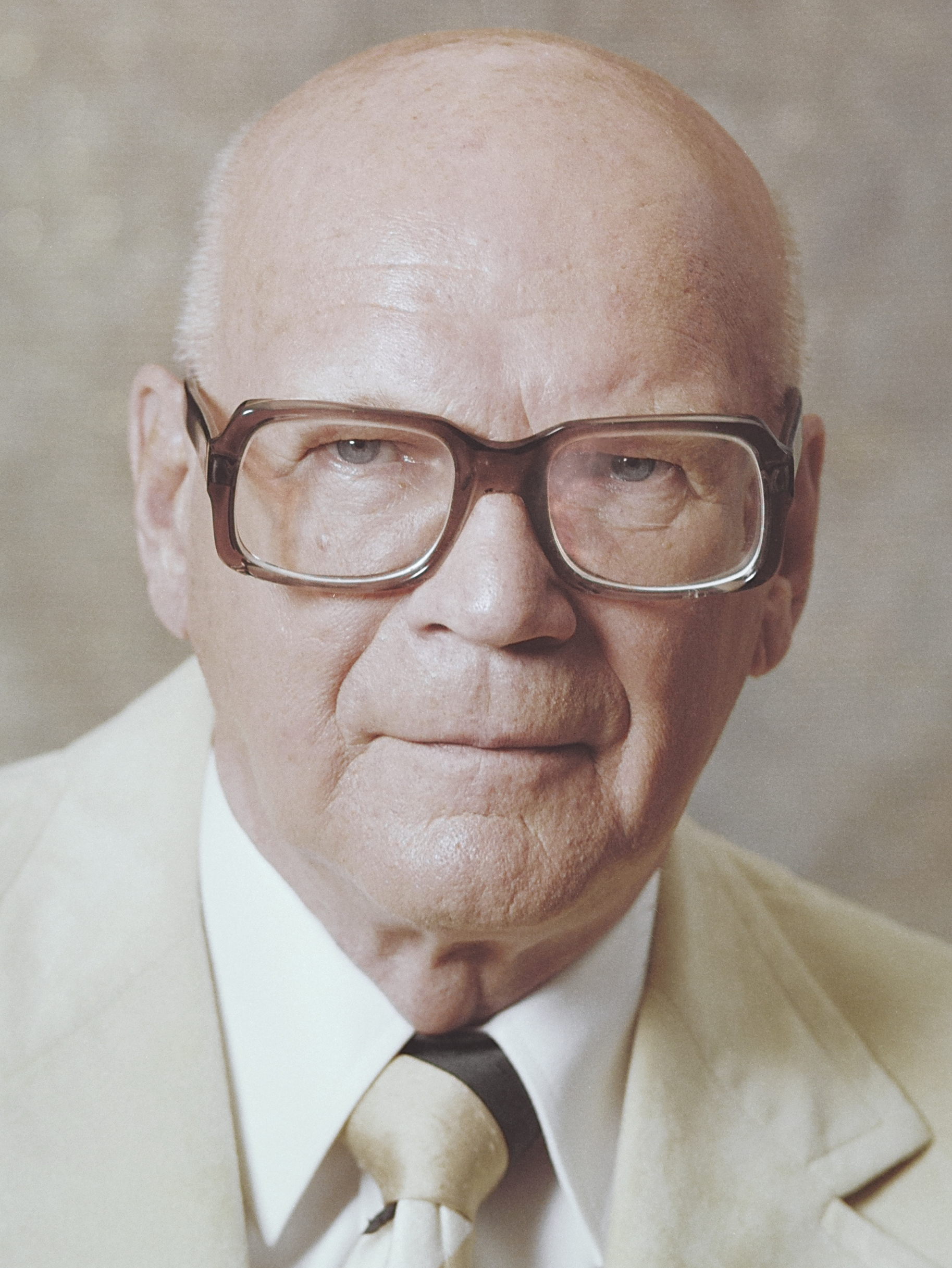

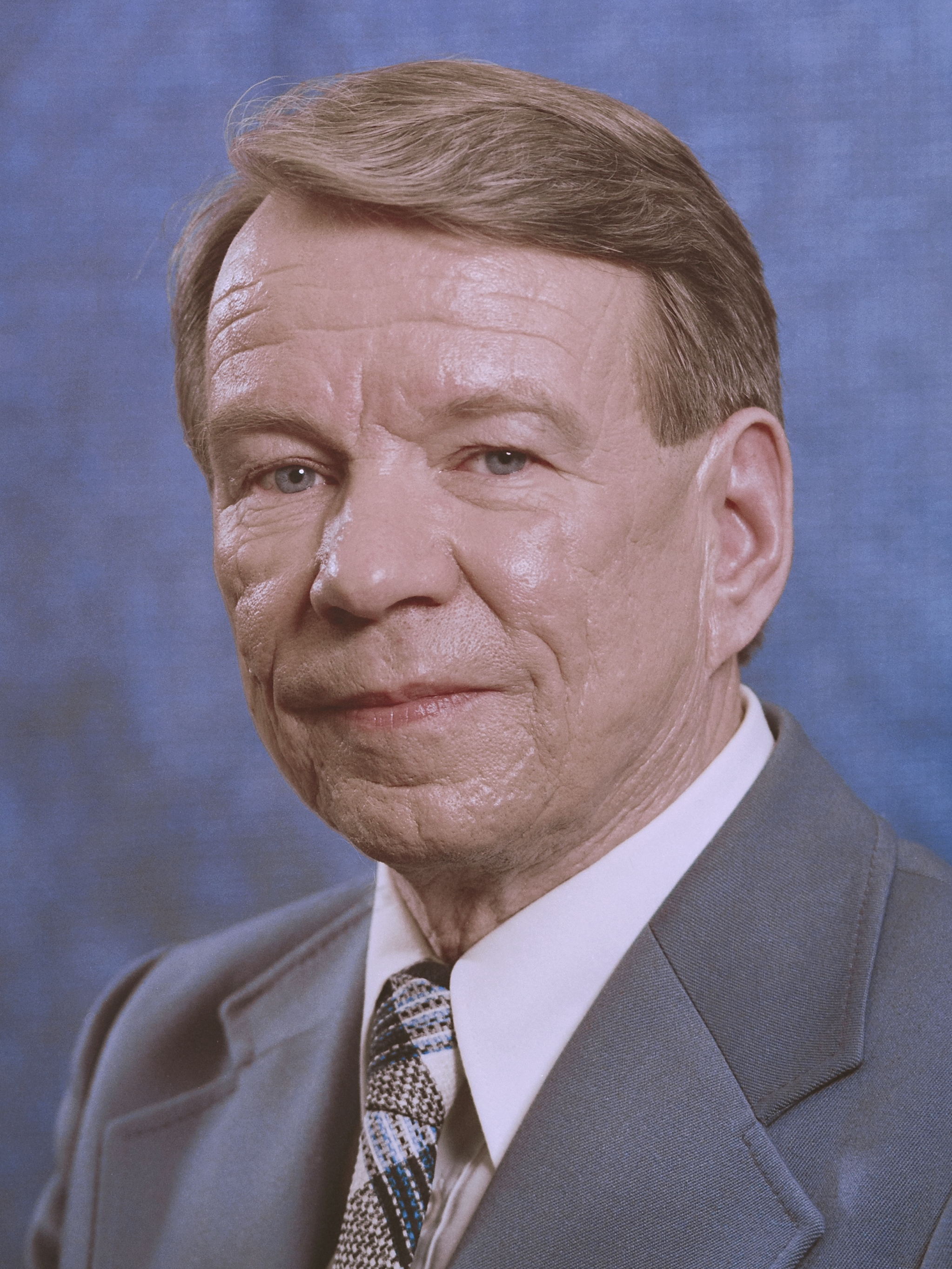

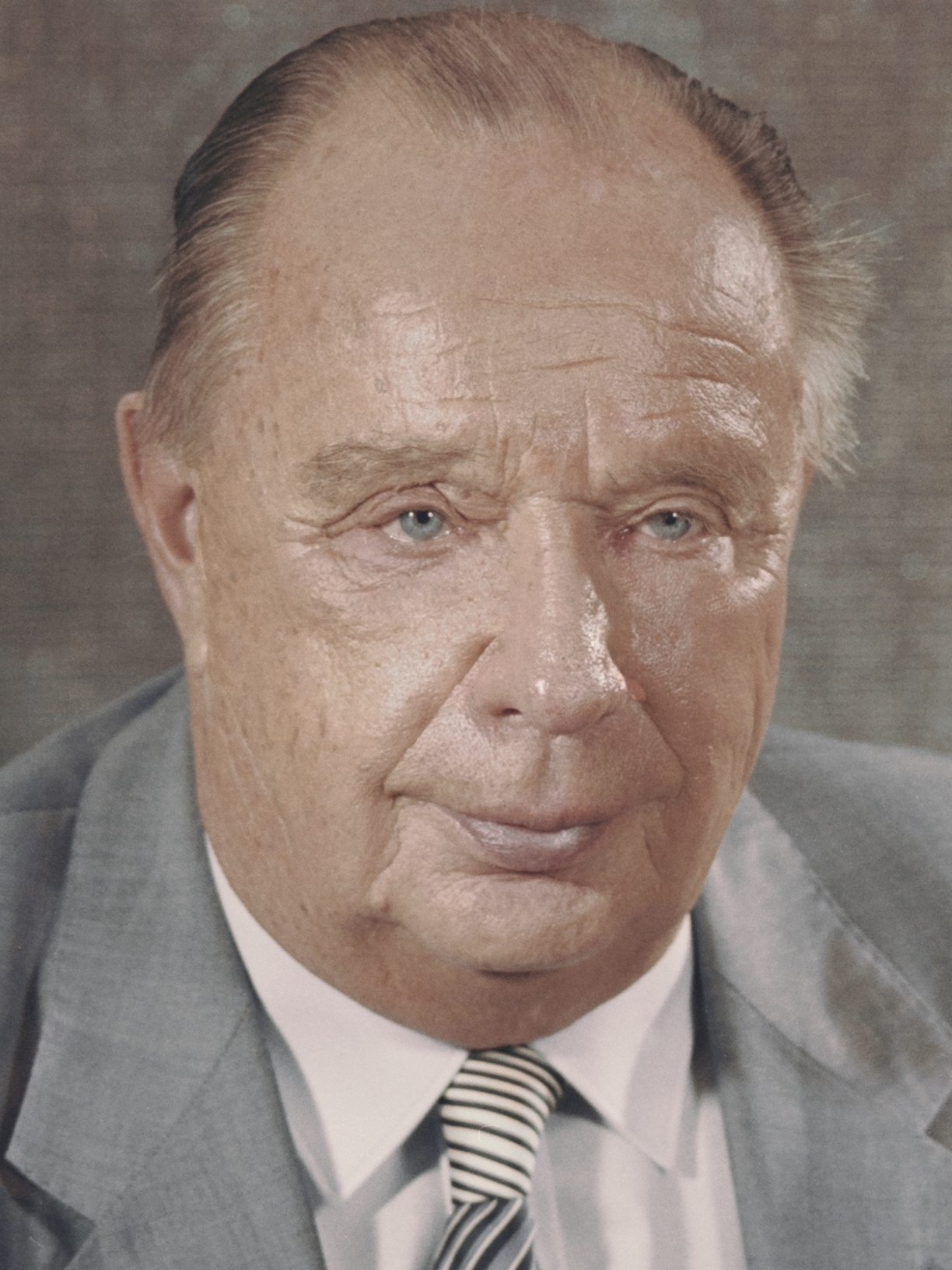
Candidate	Urho Kekkonen	Raino Westerholm
Party	Centre	Christian League
Electoral vote	259	25
Popular vote	2,017,631	215,244
		CPP
Candidate	Veikko Vennamo	Ahti M. Salonen
Party	Rural Party	CPP
Electoral vote	10	6
Popular vote	114,488	82,478
President before election
Urho Kekkonen
Centre
Elected President
Urho Kekkonen
Centre

Two-stage presidential elections were held in Finland in 1978. They were the first elections since 1968, as Parliament had extended Urho Kekkonen's term by four years. The public elected presidential electors to an electoral college on 15 and 16 January. The electors, in turn assembled in Helsinki on 15 February to formally elect the President. Urho Kekkonen, president since 1956, was re-elected on the first ballot by the electors. The turnout for the popular vote was 64%.

Kekkonen had agreed to become the Social Democratic presidential candidate in April 1975, and after that all the major Finnish political parties chose him as their candidate. Kekkonen's opponents, such as the Christian League's presidential candidate Raino Westerholm, claimed that Kekkonen's long presidency weakened Finnish democracy. Over one-third of Finnish voters abstained from voting, partly as a protest against Kekkonen's expected landslide victory.

The 77-year-old Kekkonen's health was already declining, although this was not easily noticeable in his public appearances.

== Results ==
=== Popular vote ===
Party or alliance		Votes	%	Seats
Supporters of Urho Kekkonen	Social Democratic Party	569,154	23.25	74
Supporters of Urho Kekkonen	Centre Party	475,372	19.42	64
Supporters of Urho Kekkonen	Finnish People's Democratic League	445,098	18.18	56
Supporters of Urho Kekkonen	National Coalition Party	360,310	14.72	45
Supporters of Urho Kekkonen	Swedish People's Party	88,054	3.60	12
Supporters of Urho Kekkonen	Liberals	71,232	2.91	8
Supporters of Urho Kekkonen	Åland Coalition	5,331	0.22	1
Supporters of Urho Kekkonen	Socialist Workers Party	2,187	0.09	0
Supporters of Urho Kekkonen	Private Entrepreneurs' Party	893	0.04	0
Supporters of Urho Kekkonen	Total	2,017,631	82.41	260
Finnish Christian League		215,244	8.79	24
Finnish Rural Party		114,488	4.68	10
Constitutional People's Party		82,478	3.37	6
Finnish People's Unity Party		18,543	0.76	0
Total		2,448,384	100.00	300
Valid votes		2,448,384	99.11	
Invalid/blank votes		21,955	0.89	
Total votes		2,470,339	100.00	
Registered voters/turnout		3,844,279	64.26	
Source: Nohlen & Stöver

=== Electoral college ===
Candidate	Party	Votes	%
Urho Kekkonen	Centre Party	259	86.33
Raino Westerholm	Finnish Christian League	25	8.33
Veikko Vennamo	Finnish Rural Party	10	3.33
Ahti M. Salonen	Constitutional People's Party	6	2.00
Total		300	100.00
Source: Nohlen & Stöver
