= Sallux =

Christian European political foundation

- Established: 2011; 15 years ago
- Type: European political foundation
- Headquarters: Bergstraat 33, 3811 NG Amersfoort, Netherlands
- Chairman: David Fieldsend
- Executive Director: Johannes de Jong
- Vice-chair: Gabriela Urbanova
- Affiliations: European Christian Political Movement (ECPM)
- Budget: €442,137 (2024)
- Revenue: €452,914 (2024)
- Expenses: €457,799 (2024)
- Website: sallux.eu
- Formerly called: European Christian Political Foundation (ECPF); Christian Political Foundation for Europe (CPFE)

Sallux is a European political foundation, and the official foundation/think tank of the European Christian Political Party (ECPP).

The foundation was founded in 2011. It was formerly known as the European Christian Political Foundation (ECPF) until 22 May 2014, and the Christian Political Foundation for Europe (CPFE) until 5 December 2016. Sallux is a combined word from the Latin words for salt and light.

Sallux supports and underpins the ECPP, especially in terms of political content by European co-operation and the introduction of philosophy, analysis and policy options. Sallux shares the basic program and Christian values of the ECPP. Sallux welcomes think tanks as members if they agree with these values and the Christian principles as expressed in the basic program.

Sallux is based in Amersfoort, Netherlands, and the President of the Board is David Fieldsend from the United Kingdom.

== Members, partners and associates ==
Members, partners and associates		Country
Areopagus	Member	Romania
Asociación Cristianos en Democracia	Member	Spain
Center of Ecumenical, Missiological and Environmental Studies	Partner	Greece
Clamphaminstitutet	Member	Sweden
Economic Summit	Member	Netherlands
European Evangelical Alliance	Partner	EU
Europe Is Our Future	Member	Hungary
Fondazione Magna Carta	Member	Italy
Foundation for Democracy Assistance	Associate	Ukraine
Fundacja Świętego Benedykta	Member	Poland
Guido de Brès-Stichting	Member	Netherlands
Integra	Associate	Macedonia
Jubilee Centre	Associate	United Kingdom
Ajatushautomo Kompassi	Member	Finland
Laisvos Visuomenės Institutas	Member	Lithuania
Rodina Inštitút	Member	Slovakia
Schuman Centre for European Studies	Member	EU
World Evangelical Alliance	Partner	United States
World Teach	Member	Romania
