= Ele Alenius =

Finnish politician (1925–2022)

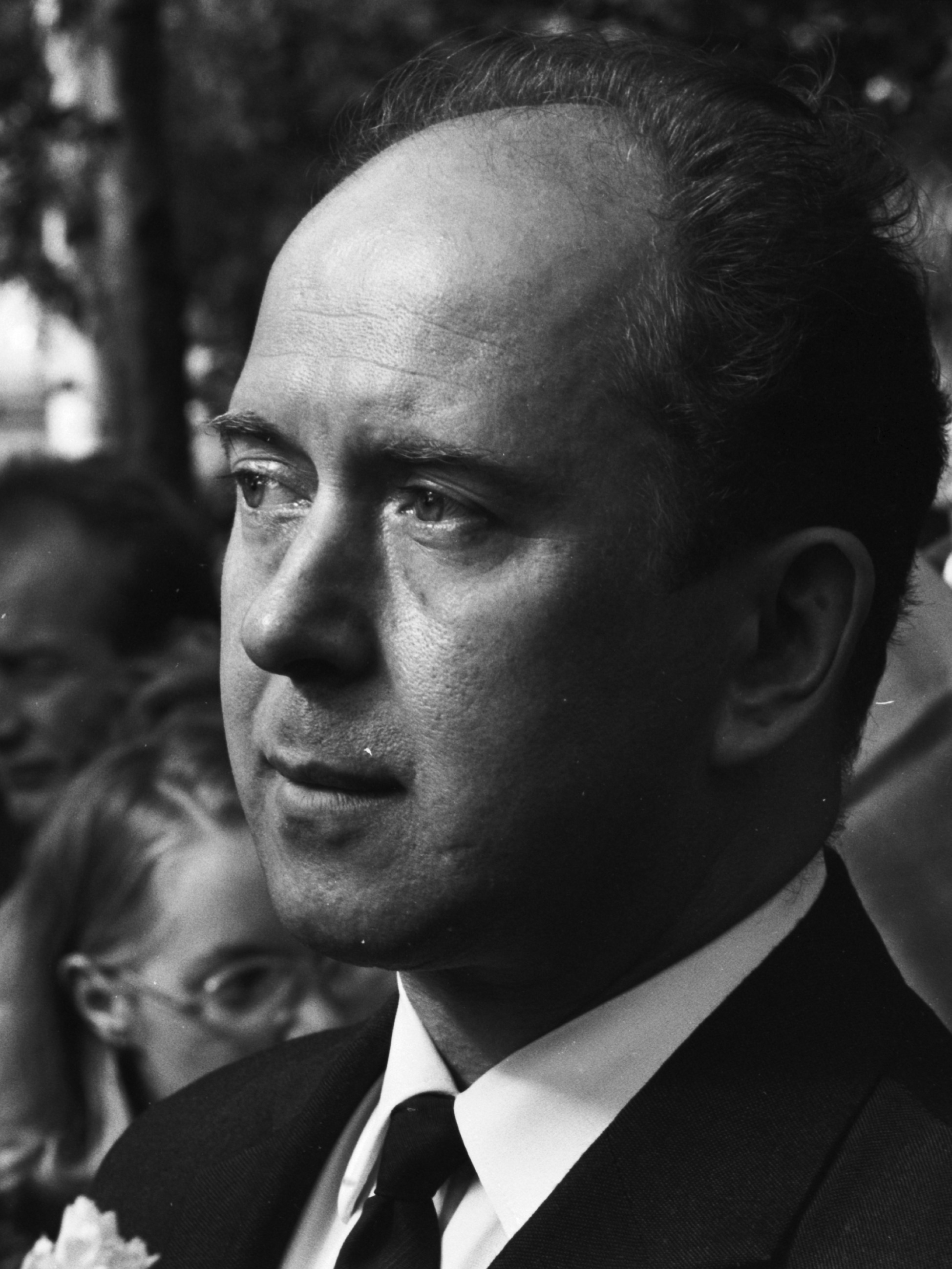
- Alenius in 1970

Deputy Minister of Finance of Finland
- In office 27 June 1966 – 14 June 1970

Member of the Parliament of Finland
- In office 5 April 1966 – 30 April 1977

Personal details
- Born: Ele Allan Alenius; 5 June 1925 Tampere, Finland
- Died: 19 November 2022 (aged 97) Helsinki, Finland

Ele Allan Alenius (5 June 1925 – 19 November 2022) was a Finnish socialist politician. He was a Member of the Parliament of Finland for the Finnish People's Democratic League (SKDL) 1966–1977 and the Deputy Minister of Finance 1966–1970. Alenius was also the chairman of the SKDL 1967–1979.

Alenius was born to the family of the stonemason and Red Guardist August Elenius. In the World War II, Alenius fought in the Finnish Army. After the war, he studied economics at the University of Helsinki and made his master's thesis in 1958.

Ele Alenius' parents were bricklayer August Felix Alenius (1899–1957) and Sylvia Matilda Koskinen (1902–1987) from Hämeenkyrö. He was the only child in his family. In the civil war, the Alenius family was on the side of the Reds. His grandfather August Alenius (1872–1923) was a member of Lyly's Red Guard staff on the Vilppula front and was sentenced to eight years in prison after the war. source? August Alenius' health deteriorated in captivity and he died soon after his pardon. Ele Alenius' father August was also in the Red Guard, but escaped without conviction. Alenius spent his early childhood in Amur, Tampere. In 1930, the family moved to Helsinki, when August Alenius, who worked as a bricklayer, had completed a private apprenticeship course and began studying at the University of Helsinki. After graduating with a master's degree in philosophy, he was blacklisted by employers in the 1930s due to his leftism, which made it difficult to get a job.

In Helsinki, the Aleniuks first lived in Kallio and later in Töölö. Alenius spent his childhood summers with his maternal grandparents in Kyröskoski in Hämeenkyrö. After the folk school, Alenius moved to the real high school in Helsinki, where his classmates included Lasse Heikkilä and Helge Dahlman. During the Winter War, the Alenius family was fleeing the bombings of Helsinki, staying with their father's brother in Toejoe, Pori, who, however, was also targeted by the bombings. Alenius participated in the continuation war. Before the end of the war, he was ordered to the 59th course of the Reserve. Alenius graduated in 1945 and then studied economics at the University of Helsinki. He graduated with a bachelor's degree in political science in 1948 and a licentiate in 1956 and received his doctorate in 1958. Alenius's university career was interrupted by his political activity, and he was also not accepted into a labor-controlled bank or cooperative. He said that he had received information that the intelligence organization of SDP led by Veikko Puskala would have been influencing in the background.

Alenius worked as CEO of the family company Taideliike Artegrafica from 1958 to 1977.

== Political activity ==
=== Party club ===
During his studies, Alenius joined the Academic Socialist Society (ASS). In 1965, Alenius was elected general secretary of SKDL. In the same year, he also became the first chairman of the Social Student Union (SOL), which was part of SKDL as a community member. In the parliamentary elections of 1966, Alenius was elected as a member of parliament from the electoral district of the city of Helsinki. He was appointed as the second finance minister in the formed Paasio government. He was a member of Yleisradio's supervisory board 1964–1967[15].

In 1967, Alenius was elected chairman of SKDL. In the spring of 1968, he had been assigned the position of Director General of the Customs Administration when Nikolai Saarnio retired, but Alenius refused the position after considering that he was needed more in SKDL's internal struggle. Alenius continued as a minister until 1970. He left parliament in 1977 when he joined the board of the Bank of Finland, and two years later he left the position of party leader. Alenius retired in 1992.

In the 1982 presidential election, the majority of SKDL placed themselves behind SDP's Mauno Koivisto in the decisive round of the election at the urging of Alenius and Kalevi Kivistö.

=== Political stance ===
Alenius described himself as a socialist for whom the cooperation of the left was important. The Communist Party of Finland (SKP) had a dominant position in SKDL, but Alenius tried to reduce SKP's role and in the 1970s led SKDL's socialist organization.

As the leader of the communist SKDL, Alenius distanced the party from the real socialism and introduced his own ideas in the 1969 and 1974 books Sosialistiseen Suomeen ("To the Socialist Finland") ja Suomalainen ratkaisu ("The Finnish Solution") which were strongly criticized by the Soviet Union. In 1968, Alenius condemned the Soviet invasion of Czechoslovakia. He left the politics in 1977 and worked as a board member of the Bank of Finland until 1992.

Alenius's work Sosialistiseen Suomeen (1969) represented a socialism that made a radical departure from strict Marxist orthodoxy. Alenius demanded a peaceful and parliamentary transition to a socialist society. He emphasized the importance of heavy industry in the future economic life and demanded its gradual nationalization and a state-owned company-led industrialization policy. Alenius believed that small and medium-sized companies could continue to operate as private companies even in a socialist system. He emphasized that we should only move to socialism if the Finnish people really want it. Alenius even proposed that the socialist social system could be abandoned if the people so desired. In an interview in 2004, he said that he fought for the independence of all of Finland, emphasizing especially the spiritual side of the matter. In an interview with Helsingin Sanomat in August 2020, 95-year-old Alenius stated how it would have been better if the Soviet Union had never been born and never existed.
