= Raino Westerholm =

Finnish politician (1919–2017)

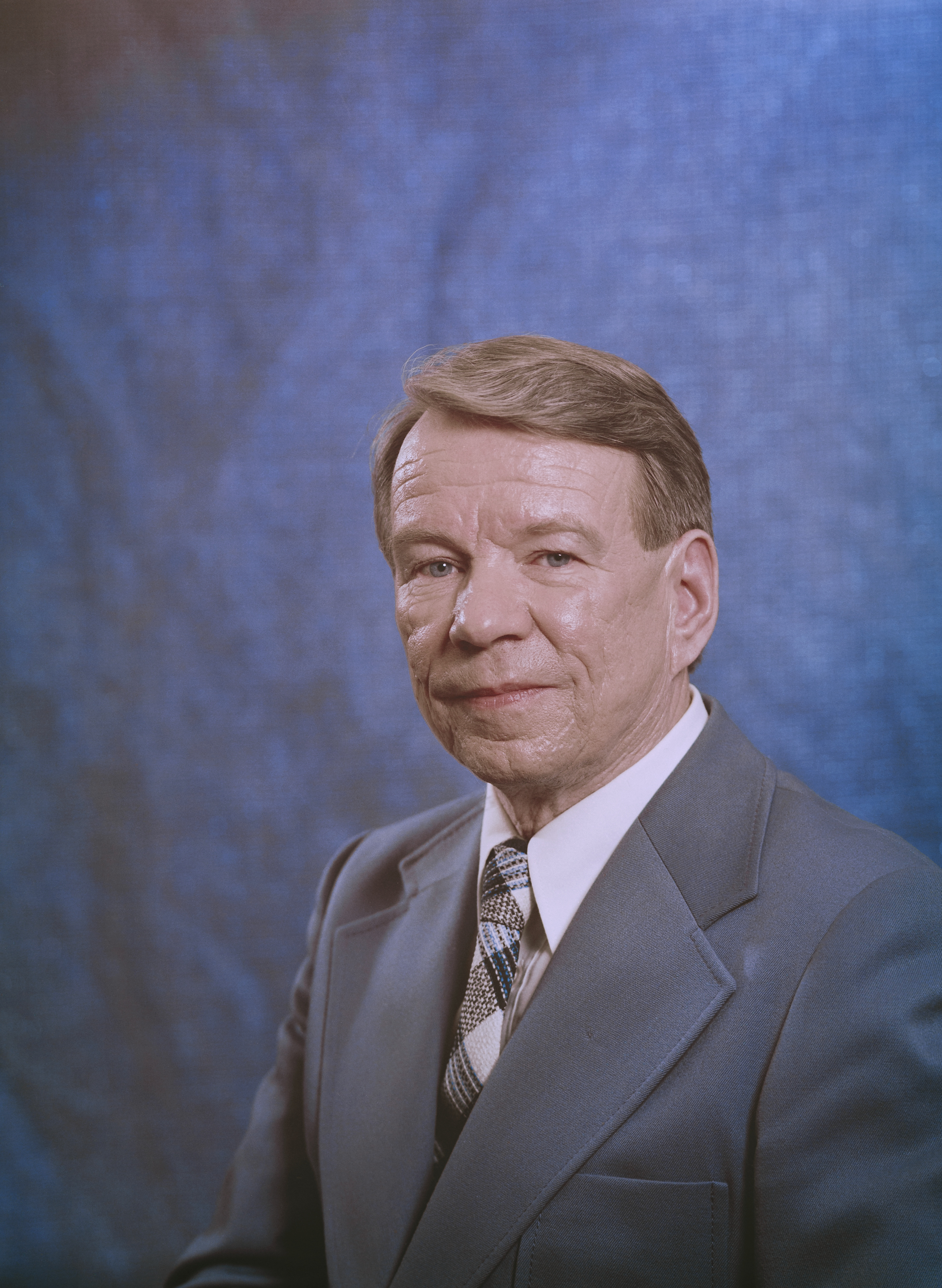

Leader of the Finnish Christian League
- In office 1973–1982
- Preceded by: Olavi Majlander
- Succeeded by: Esko Almgren

Personal details
- Born: 20 November 1919 Kuusankoski, Finland
- Died: 1 June 2017 (aged 97) Helsinki, Finland
- Party: Finnish Christian League
- Spouse: Sirkka-Liisa Westerholm

Raino Olavi Westerholm (20 November 1919 – 1 June 2017) was a Finnish politician. Westerholm was born in Kuusankoski. He was leader of the Finnish Christian League from 1973 to 1982. He was also member of the Finnish parliament from 1970 to 1979.

Westerholm ran for president twice, in the 1978 and 1982 elections.

Party political offices
Preceded by Olavi Majlander	Leader of the Finnish Christian League; 1973–1982	Succeeded by Esko Almgren
