= List of Cabinet Ministers from Finland by ministerial portfolio =

This is a list of Cabinet Ministers from Finland by ministerial portfolio. The list is an alphabetical order.

== Political party table ==
Party	Number of Ministers (Total)
Social Democratic Party	249
National Coalition Party	116
Agrarian League+Centre Party	262
Left Alliance	10
People's Democratic League	37
Green League	10
Christian Democrats	6
Liberal People's Party	13
Social Democratic Union of Workers and Smallholders	9
People's Party	15
True Finns	4
Rural Party	5
Finnish Party	5
Young Finnish Party	11
National Progressive Party	53
Swedish People's Party	86
Patriotic People's Movement	1
Non-Partisan/Independent	180

== List of ministers ==
=== Minister of Regional and Municipal Affairs ===
Minister	In Office	Cabinet (Cabinets)	Number of Ministerial days (Total)	Party
Martti Korhonen	15 Apr 1999–17 Apr 2003	Lipponen II	1464	Left Alliance
Hannes Manninen	17 Apr 2003–24 Jun 2003; 24 Jun 2003–19 Apr 2007	Jäätteenmäki; Vanhanen I	1464	Centre Party

=== Minister for Housing ===
Minister	In Office	Cabinet (Cabinets)	Number of Ministerial days (Total)	Party
Jan Vapaavuori	19 Apr 2007–22 Jun 2010; 22 Jun 2010–22 Jun 2011	Kiviniemi; Vanhanen II	1526	National Coalition Party

=== Minister of Housing and Communications ===
Minister	In Office	Cabinet (Cabinets)	Number of Ministerial days (Total)	Party
Krista Kiuru	22 Jun 2011–24 May 2013	Katainen	703	Social Democratic Party
Pia Viitanen	24 May 2013–4 Apr 2014	Katainen	316	Social Democratic Party

=== Minister of Economic Affairs ===
Minister	In Office	Cabinet (Cabinets)	Number of Ministerial days (Total)	Party
Mauri Pekkarinen	1 Jan 2008–22 Jun 2010; 22 Jun 2010–22 Jun 2011	Kiviniemi; Vanhanen II	1269	Centre Party
Jyri Häkämies	22 Jun 2011–16 Nov 2012	Katainen	514	National Coalition Party
Jan Vapaavuori	16 Nov 2012–24 Jun 2014; 24 Jun 2014–29 May 2015	Katainen; Stubb	2451	National Coalition Party
Olli Rehn	29 May 2015–1 Jan 2017	Sipilä	3717	Centre Party
Mika Lintilä	1 Jan 2017–Incumbent	Sipilä	3134	Centre Party

=== Minister of Provisions ===
Minister	In Office	Cabinet (Cabinets)	Number of Ministerial days (Total)	Party
Mikko Collan	27 Nov 1918–17 Apr 1919; 17 Apr 1919–15 Aug 1919; 15 Aug 1919–15 Mar 1920	Ingman I Kaarlo Castrén; Vennola I	475	National Progressive Party
Kaarlo Wuokoski	26 Mar 1920–9 February 1921	Erich	321	National Progressive Party

=== Master of Provisional Affairs ===
Minister	In Office	Cabinet (Cabinets)	Number of Ministerial days (Total)	Party
H. G. Paloheimo	27 May 1918–27 Nov 1918	Paasikivi I	185	Finnish Party

=== Minister for European Affairs and Foreign Trade ===
Minister	In Office	Cabinet (Cabinets)	Number of Ministerial days (Total)	Party
Alexander Stubb	22 Jun 2011–24 Jun 2014	Katainen	1099	National Coalition Party
Lenita Toivakka	24 Jun 2014–29 May 2015	Stubb	340	National Coalition Party

=== People's Service Minister ===
Minister	In Office	Cabinet (Cabinets)	Number of Ministerial days (Total)	Party
Rainer von Fieandt	20 Sep 1939–1 Dec 1939; 1 Dec 1939–27 Mar 1940	Cajander III; Ryti I	190	Non-Partisan/Independent
Väinö Tanner	27 Mar 1940–15 Aug 1940	Ryti II	142	Social Democratic Party
Väinö Kotilainen	15 Aug 1940–4 Jan 1941; 4 Jan 1941–16 Apr 1941	Ryti II; Rangell	245	Non-Partisan/Independent
Väinö Arola	16 Apr 1941–3 Jul 1942	Rangell	444	Agrarian League
Henrik Ramsay	3 Jul 1942–5 Mar 1943	Rangell	246	Swedish People's Party
Kaarle Ellilä	5 Mar 1943–8 Aug 1944; 8 Aug 1944–21 Sep 1944; 21 Sep 1944–17 Nov 1944	Linkomies; Hackzell; Kaarlo Castrén	624	Agrarian League
Kalle Jutila	17 Nov 1944–17 Apr 1945	Paasikivi II	152	Agrarian League
Kaarlo Hillilä	17 Apr 1945–26 Mar 1946	Paasikivi III	344	Agrarian League
Taavi Vilhula	26 Mar 1946–29 Jul 1948	Pekkala	857	Agrarian League
Onni Toivonen	29 Jul 1948–17 Mar 1950	Fagerholm I	597	Social Democratic Party

=== Minister of Trade and Industry ===
Minister	In Office	Cabinet (Cabinets)	Number of Ministerial days (Total)	Party
Julius Stjernvall	27 Nov 1918–17 Apr 1919	Ingman I	142	Swedish People's Party
Juho Vennola	17 Apr 1919–15 Aug 1919	Kaarlo Castrén	121	National Progressive Party
Eero Erkko	15 Aug 1919–15 Mar 1920	Vennola I	214	National Progressive Party
Leo Ehrnrooth	15 Mar 1920–12 Aug 1920	Erich	151	Swedish People's Party
Hjalmar Procopé	19 Aug 1920–9 Apr 1921; 19 Jan 1924–31 May 1924	Erich; Cajander II	368	Swedish People's Party; Non-Partisan/Independent
Erkki Makkonen	9 Apr 1921–2 Jun 1922	Vennola II	420	National Progressive Party
Aukusti Aho	2 Jun 1922–14 Nov 1922; 30 Nov 1922–18 Jan 1924	Cajander I Kallio I	581	Non-Partisan/Independent
Axel Palmgren	31 May 1924–31 Mar 1925; 21 Mar 1931–14 Dec 1932	Ingman II; Sunila II	940	Swedish People's Party
Yrjö Pulkkinen	31 Mar 1925–31 Dec 1925	Tulenheimo	276	National Coalition Party
Tyko Reinikka	31 Dec 1925–13 Dec 1926	Kallio II	348	Agrarian League
Väinö Hupli	13 Dec 1926–17 Dec 1927	Tanner	370	Social Democratic Party
Pekka Heikkinen	17 Dec 1927–22 Dec 1928; 16 Aug 1929–4 Jul 1930	Sunila I Kallio III	695	Agrarian League
Kyösti Järvinen	22 Dec 1928–16 Aug 1929	Mantere	238	Non-Partisan/Independent
Axel Solitander	4 Jul 1930–21 Mar 1931	Svinhufvud II	261	Non-Partisan/Independent
Ilmari Killinen	30 Dec 1932–6 Mar 1936	Kivimäki	1163	National Progressive Party
Väinö Arola	6 Mar 1936–7 Oct 1936	Kivimäki	216	Agrarian League
Kalle Kauppi	7 Oct 1936–12 Mar 1937	Kallio IV	157	National Progressive Party
Väinö Voionmaa	12 Mar 1937–1 Dec 1938	Cajander III	630	Social Democratic Party
Väinö Kotilainen	1 Dec 1939–27 Mar 1940; 27 Mar 1940–15 Aug 1940	Ryti I Ryti II	259	Non-Partisan/Independent
Toivo Salmio	23 Aug 1940–4 Jan 1941; 4 Jan 1941–3 Jul 1941	Ryti II; Rangell	315	Social Democratic Party
Väinö Tanner	3 Jul 1941–22 May 1942	Rangell	324	Social Democratic Party
Uuno Takki	22 May 1942–5 Mar 1943; 5 Mar 1943–8 Aug 1944; 8 Aug 1944–21 Sep 1944; 21 Sep 1944–17 Nov 1944; 26 Mar 1946–29 Jul 1948; 29 Jul 1948–17 Mar 1950	Rangell; Linkomies; Hackzell; U. Castrén; Pekkala; Fagerholm I	2364	Social Democratic Party
Åke Gartz	17 Nov 1944–17 Apr 1945; 17 Apr 1945–26 Mar 1946	Paasikivi II; Paasikivi III	495	Non-Partisan/Independent
Sakari Tuomioja	17 Mar 1950–30 Sep 1950	Kekkonen I	198	National Progressive Party
Teuvo Aura	30 Sep 1950–17 Jan 1951; 9 Jul 1953–17 Nov 1953; 17 Nov 1953–5 May 1954	Kekkonen I Kekkonen IV; Tuomioja	411	Non-Partisan/Independent; Non-Partisan/Independent; National Progressive Party
Penna Tervo	17 Jan 1951–20 Sep 1951; 20 Sep 1951–9 Jul 1953; 5 May 1954–20 Oct 1954	Kekkonen II; Kekkonen III; Törngren	1074	Social Democratic Party
Aarre Simonen	20 Oct 1954–3 Mar 1956	Kekkonen V	501	Social Democratic Party
Kauno Kleemola	3 Mar 1956–27 May 1957	Fagerholm II	451	Agrarian League
Esa Kaitila	27 May 1957–29 Nov 1957	Sukselainen I	187	People's Party
Lauri Kivekäs	29 Nov 1957–26 Apr 1958; 26 Apr 1958–29 Aug 1958	Von Fieandt; Kuuskoski	274	Non-Partisan/Independent
Onni Hiltunen	29 Aug 1958–13 Jan 1959	Fagerholm III	138	Social Democratic Party
Ahti Karjalainen	13 Jan 1959–19 Jun 1961	Sukselainen II	889	Agrarian League
Björn Westerlund	19 Jun 1961–14 Jul 1961	Sukselainen II	26	Swedish People's Party
Ilmari Hustich	14 Jul 1961–13 Apr 1962	Miettunen I	274	Non-Partisan/Independent
Toivo Wiherheimo	13 Apr 1962–18 Dec 1963; 12 Sep 1964–27 May 1966	Karjalainen I Virolainen	1238	National Coalition Party
Olavi J. Mattila	18 Dec 1963–12 Sep 1964; 14 May 1970–15 Jul 1970	Lehto; Aura I	333	Non-Partisan/Independent
Olavi Salonen	27 May 1966–22 Mar 1968	Paasio I	666	Social Democratic Party
Grels Teir	22 Mar 1968–14 May 1970; 4 Sep 1972–31 Dec 1972	Koivisto I Sorsa III	903	Swedish People's Party
Arne Berner	15 Jul 1970–29 Oct 1971; 29 Sep 1976–15 May 1977	Karjalainen I Miettunen III	701	Liberal People's Party
Gunnar Korhonen	29 Oct 1971–23 February 1972	Aura II	118	Non-Partisan/Independent
Jussi Linnamo	23 February 1972–4 Sep 1972	Paasio II	195	Social Democratic Party
Jan-Magnus Jansson	1 Jan 1973–30 Sep 1974	Sorsa I	638	Swedish People's Party
Kristian Gestrin	1 Oct 1974–13 Jun 1975	Sorsa I	256	Swedish People's Party
Arvo Rytkönen	13 Jun 1975–30 Nov 1975	Liinamaa	171	Non-Partisan/Independent
Yrjö Rantala	30 Nov 1975–29 Sep 1976; 15 May 1977 – 26 May 1979	Miettunen III; Sorsa II	1047	Social Democratic Party
Ulf Sundqvist	26 May 1979–30 Jun 1981	Koivisto II	767	Social Democratic Party
Pirkko Työläjärvi	1 Jul 1981–19 February 1982	Koivisto II	234	Social Democratic Party
Esko Ollila	19 February 1982 – 6 May 1983	Sorsa III	442	Centre Party
Seppo Lindblom	6 May 1983–30 Apr 1987	Sorsa IV	1456	Social Democratic Party
Ilkka Suominen	30 Apr 1987–26 Apr 1991	Holkeri	1458	National Coalition Party
Kauko Juhantalo	26 Apr 1991–3 Aug 1992	Aho	466	Centre Party
Pekka Tuomisto	3 Aug 1992–31 Jul 1993	Aho	363	Centre Party
Seppo Kääriäinen	1 Aug 1993–13 Apr 1995	Aho	621	Centre Party
Antti Kalliomäki	13 Apr 1995–15 Apr 1999	Lipponen I	1464	Social Democratic Party
Erkki Tuomioja	15 Apr 1999–25 February 2000	Lipponen II	317	Social Democratic Party
Sinikka Mönkäre	25 February 2000–17 Apr 2003	Lipponen II	1148	Social Democratic Party
Mauri Pekkarinen	17 Apr 2003–24 Jun 2003; 24 Jun 2003–19 Apr 2007; 19 Apr 2007–1 Jan 2008	Jäätteenmäki; Vanhanen I Vanhanen II	1721	Centre Party

=== Master of Trade and Industry affairs ===
Minister	In Office	Cabinet (Cabinets)	Number of Ministerial days (Total)	Party
Heikki Renvall	27 Nov 1917–27 May 1918; 27 May 1918–27 Nov 1918	Svinhufvud I Paasikivi I	366	Young Finnish Party

=== Minister for International Development ===
Minister	In Office	Cabinet (Cabinets)	Number of Ministerial days (Total)	Party
Heidi Hautala	22 Jun 2011–17 Oct 2013	Katainen	849	Green League
Pekka Haavisto	17 Oct 2013–24 Jun 2014; 24 Jun 2014–26 Sep 2014	Katainen; Stubb	345	Green League
Sirpa Paatero	26 Sep 2014–29 May 2015	Stubb	246	Social Democratic Party

=== Minister of Church and Education ===
Minister	In Office	Cabinet (Cabinets)	Number of Ministerial days (Total)	Party
Mikael Soininen	27 Nov 1918–17 Apr 1919; 17 Apr 1919–15 Aug 1919; 15 Aug 1919–15 Mar 1920	Ingman I U.Castrén; Vennola I	475	National Progressive Party
Lauri Ingman	15 Mar 1920–9 Apr 1921	Erich	391	National Coalition Party
Niilo Liakka	9 Apr 1921–2 Jun 1922	Vennola II	420	Agrarian League

=== Master of Church and Education affairs ===
Minister	In Office	Cabinet (Cabinets)	Number of Ministerial days (Total)	Party
Emil Nestor Setälä	27 Nov 1917–27 May 1918; 27 May 1918–27 Nov 1918	Svinhufvud I Paasikivi I	366	Young Finnish Party

=== Minister of Transport and Public Works ===
Minister	In Office	Cabinet (Cabinets)	Number of Ministerial days (Total)	Party
Bernhard Wuolle	27 Nov 1918–17 Apr 1919	Ingman I	142	National Coalition Party
Eero Erkko	17 Apr 1919–15 Aug 1919	U. Castrén	121	National Progressive Party
Santeri Pohjanpalo	15 Aug 1919–15 Mar 1920	Vennola I	214	National Progressive Party
Magnus Lavonius	15 Mar 1920–9 Apr 1921	Erich	391	National Progressive Party
Erkki Pullinen	9 Apr 1921–2 Jun 1922; 14 Nov 1922–18 Jan 1924	Vennola II; Kallio I	851	National Progressive Party
Evert Skogström	2 Jun 1922–14 Nov 1922; 18 Jan 1924–31 May 1924	Cajander I Cajander II	301	Non-Partisan/Independent
Eero Hahl	31 May 1924–22 Nov 1924	Ingman II	176	Agrarian League
Rolf Witting	22 Nov 1924–31 Mar 1925; 4 Jul 1930–21 Mar 1931	Ingman II; Svinhufvud II	391	Swedish People's Party
Kyösti Kallio	31 Mar 1925–31 Dec 1925	Tulenheimo	276	Agrarian League
Juho Niukkanen	31 Dec 1925–13 Dec 1926; 21 Mar 1931–14 Dec 1932	Kallio II; Sunila II	983	Agrarian League
Wäinö Wuolijoki	13 Dec 1926–15 Nov 1927	Tanner	338	Social Democratic Party
Johan Helo	15 Nov 1927–17 Dec 1927	Tanner	33	Social Democratic Party
Eemil Hynninen	17 Dec 1927–22 Dec 1928	Sunila I	372	Agrarian League
Jalmar Castrén	22 Dec 1928–16 Aug 1929	Mantere	238	Non-Partisan/Independent
Jalo Lahdensuo	16 Aug 1929–4 Jul 1930; 7 Oct 1936–12 Mar 1937	Kallio III; Kallio IV	480	Agrarian League
Eemil Linna	14 Dec 1932–25 Sep 1936	Kivimäki	1382	National Progressive Party
Erik Koskenmaa	25 Sep 1936–7 Oct 1936	Kivimäki	13	Non-Partisan/Independent
Hannes Ryömä	12 Mar 1937–2 Sep 1938	Cajander III	540	Social Democratic Party
Väinö Salovaara	2 Sep 1938–1 Dec 1939; 1 Dec 1939–27 Mar 1940; 27 Mar 1940–4 Jan 1941; 4 Jan 1941–5 Mar 1943; 5 Mar 1943–8 Aug 1944; 8 Aug 1944–21 Sep 1944; 21 Sep 1944–17 Nov 1944	Cajander III; Ryti I Ryti II; Rangell; Linkomies; Hackzell; U. Castrén	2269	Social Democratic Party
Eero Wuori	17 Nov 1944–17 Apr 1945; 17 Apr 1945–29 Sep 1945	Paasikivi II; Paasikivi III	317	Social Democratic Party
Onni Peltonen	9 Nov 1945–26 Mar 1946; 29 Jul 1948–17 Mar 1950; 17 Jan 1951–20 Sep 1951; 20 Sep 1951–29 Nov 1952	Paasikivi III; Fagerholm I Kekkonen II; Kekkonen III	1418	Social Democratic Party
Lauri Kaijalainen	26 Mar 1946–29 Jul 1948	Pekkala	857	Agrarian League
Martti Miettunen	17 Mar 1950–17 Jan 1951; 5 May 1954–20 Oct 1954; 20 Oct 1954–3 Mar 1956	Kekkonen II; Törngren; Kekkonen V	976	Agrarian League
Eemil Huunonen	29 Nov 1952–3 Dec 1952	Kekkonen III	5	Social Democratic Party
Eetu Karjalainen	3 Dec 1952–9 Jul 1953	Kekkonen III	219	Social Democratic Party
Eero Mäkinen	9 Jul 1953–27 Oct 1953	Kekkonen IV	111	Non-Partisan/Independent
Kustaa Eskola	30 Oct 1953–17 Nov 1953; 27 May 1957–2 Jul 1957; 29 Aug 1958–13 Jan 1959	Kekkonen IV; Sukselainen I Fagerholm III	194	Agrarian League
Erik Serlachius	17 Nov 1953–5 May 1954	Tuomioja	170	Non-Partisan/Independent
Eino Palovesi	3 Mar 1956–27 May 1957	Fagerholm II	451	Agrarian League
Aku Sumu	29 Nov 1957–28 February 1958	Von Fieandt	92	Non-Partisan/Independent
Paavo Kastari	28 February 1958–26 Apr 1958; 26 Apr 1958–29 Aug 1958	Von Fieandt; Kuuskoski	183	Non-Partisan/Independent
Kauno Kleemola	13 Jan 1959–14 Jul 1961; 14 Jul 1961–26 February 1962	Sukselainen II; Miettunen I	1141	Agrarian League
Eeli Erkkilä	26 February 1962–13 Apr 1962	Miettunen I	47	Agrarian League
Veikko Savela	13 Apr 1962–18 Dec 1963	Karjalainen I	615	Agrarian League
Martti Niskala	18 Dec 1963–12 Sep 1964	Lehto	270	Non-Partisan/Independent
Grels Teir	12 Sep 1964–27 May 1966	Virolainen	623	Swedish People's Party
Leo Suonpää	27 May 1966–22 Mar 1968	Paasio I	666	People's Democratic League
Paavo Aitio	22 Mar 1968–28 February 1970	Koivisto I	709	People's Democratic League

=== Master of Transport and Public Works ===
Minister	In Office	Cabinet (Cabinets)	Number of Ministerial days (Total)	Party
Jalmar Castrén	27 Nov 1917–27 May 1918; 27 May 1918–27 Nov 1918	Svinhufvud I Paasikivi I	366	Young Finnish Party

=== Minister of Culture and Housing ===
Minister	In Office	Cabinet (Cabinets)	Number of Ministerial days (Total)	Party
Pia Viitanen	4 Apr 2014–24 Jun 2014; 24 Jun 2014–29 May 2015	Katainen; Stubb	736	Social Democratic Party

=== Minister for Culture and Sports ===
Minister	In Office	Cabinet (Cabinets)	Number of Ministerial days (Total)	Party
Stefan Wallin	19 Apr 2007–1 May 2010; 1 May 2010–22 Jun 2010; 22 Jun 2010–22 Jun 2011	Vanhanen I Vanhanen II	1526	Swedish People's Party
Paavo Arhinmäki	22 Jun 2011–4 Apr 2014	Katainen	1018	Left Alliance
Sampo Terho	5 May 2017-Incumbent	Sipilä		True Finns

=== Minister of Culture ===
Minister	In Office	Cabinet (Cabinets)	Number of Ministerial days (Total)	Party
Suvi Lindén	15 Apr 1999–5 Jun 2002	Lipponen II	1148	National Coalition Party
Ritva Dromberg	5 Jun 2002–17 Apr 2003	Lipponen II	317	National Coalition Party
Tanja Saarela	17 Apr 2003–24 Jun 2003; 24 Jun 2003–19 Apr 2007	Jäätteenmäki; Vanhanen I	1464	Centre Party

=== Minister of Local Government and Public Reforms ===
Minister	In Office	Cabinet (Cabinets)	Number of Ministerial days (Total)	Party
Anu Vehviläinen	29 May 2015–Incumbent	Sipilä	3717	Centre Party

=== Minister of Transport and Local Government ===
Minister	In Office	Cabinet (Cabinets)	Number of Ministerial days (Total)	Party
Henna Virkkunen	4 Apr 2014–24 Jun 2014	Katainen	82	National Coalition Party
Paula Risikko	24 Jun 2014–29 May 2015	Stubb	2963	National Coalition Party

=== Minister of Transport and Communications ===
Minister	In Office	Cabinet (Cabinets)	Number of Ministerial days (Total)	Party
Olli-Pekka Heinonen	1 Sep 2000–4 Jan 2002	Lipponen II	491	National Coalition Party
Kimmo Sasi	4 Jan 2002–17 Apr 2003	Lipponen II	469	National Coalition Party
Leena Luhtanen	17 Apr 2003–24 Jun 2003; 24 Jun 2003–23 Sep 2005	Jäätteenmäki; Vanhanen I	891	Social Democratic Party
Susanna Huovinen	23 Sep 2005–19 Apr 2007	Vanhanen I	574	Social Democratic Party
Anne Berner	29 May 2015	Sipilä	3717	Centre Party

=== Minister of Transport ===
Minister	In Office	Cabinet (Cabinets)	Number of Ministerial days (Total)	Party
Paavo Aitio	1 Mar 1970–14 May 1970	Koivisto I	75	People's Democratic League
Martti Niskala	14 May 1970–15 Jul 1970	Aura I	63	Non-Partisan/Independent
Veikko Saarto	15 Jul 1970–26 Mar 1971; 15 May 1977 – 26 May 1979; 26 May 1979 – 19 February 1982	Karjalainen I Sorsa II; Koivisto II	1997	People's Democratic League
Kalervo Haapasalo	26 Mar 1971–29 Oct 1971	Karjalainen I	218	Social Democratic Party
Esa Timonen	29 Oct 1971–23 February 1972; 13 Jun 1975–30 Nov 1975	Aura II; Liinamaa	289	Non-Partisan/Independent
Valde Nevalainen	23 February 1972–4 Sep 1972	Paasio II	195	Social Democratic Party
Pekka Tarjanne	4 Sep 1972–13 Jun 1975	Sorsa I	1013	Liberal People's Party
Kauko Hjerppe	30 Nov 1975–29 Sep 1976	Miettunen II	305	People's Democratic League
Ragnar Granvik	29 Sep 1976–15 May 1977	Miettunen III	229	Swedish People's Party
Jarmo Wahlström	19 February 1982–31 Dec 1982	Sorsa III	316	People's Democratic League
Reino Breilin	31 Dec 1982–6 May 1983	Sorsa III	127	Social Democratic Party
Matti Puhakka	6 May 1983–30 Nov 1984	Sorsa IV	575	Social Democratic Party
Matti Luttinen	1 Dec 1984–30 Apr 1987	Sorsa IV	881	Social Democratic Party
Pekka Vennamo	30 Apr 1987–30 Sep 1989	Holkeri	885	Finnish Rural Party
Raimo Vistbacka	1 Oct 1989–28 Aug 1990	Holkeri	332	Finnish Rural Party
Ilkka Kanerva	28 Aug 1990–26 Apr 1991	Holkeri	242	National Coalition Party
Ole Norrback	26 Apr 1991–13 Apr 1995	Aho	1449	Swedish People's Party
Tuula Linnainmaa	13 Apr 1995–1 Apr 1997	Lipponen I	720	National Coalition Party
Matti Aura	2 Apr 1997–15 Jan 1999	Lipponen I	654	National Coalition Party
Kimmo Sasi	15 Jan 1999–15 Apr 1999	Lipponen I	91	National Coalition Party
Olli-Pekka Heinonen	15 Apr 1999–1 Sep 2000	Lipponen II	506	National Coalition Party
Anu Vehviläinen	19 Apr 2007–22 Jun 2010; 22 Jun 2010–22 Jun 2011	Vanhanen II; Kiviniemi	1526	Centre Party
Merja Kyllönen	22 Jun 2011–4 Apr 2014	Katainen	1018	Left Alliance

=== Minister of Agriculture and Forestry ===
Minister	In Office	Cabinet (Cabinets)	Number of Ministerial days (Total)	Party
Nestor Kaasalainen	1 Mar 1971–29 Oct 1971	Karjalainen I	243	Centre Party
Vilho Suomela	29 Oct 1971–23 February 1972	Aura II	118	Non-Partisan/Independent
Leo Happonen	23 February 1972–4 Sep 1972	Paasio II	195	Social Democratic Party
Erkki Haukipuro	4 Sep 1972–31 Jul 1973	Sorsa I	331	Centre Party
Heimo	1 Aug 1973–13 Jun 1975; 30 Nov 1975–29 Sep 1976	Sorsa I Miettunen II	987	Centre Party
Veikko Ihamuotila	13 Jun 1975–30 Nov 1975	Liinamaa	171	Non-Partisan/Independent
Johannes Virolainen	29 Sep 1976–15 May 1977; 15 May 1977 – 26 May 1979	Miettunen III; Sorsa II	970	Centre Party
Taisto Tähkämaa	26 May 1979 – 19 February 1982; 19 February 1982 – 6 May 1983	Koivisto II; Sorsa III	1442	Centre Party
Toivo Yläjärvi	6 May 1983–30 Apr 1987	Sorsa IV	1456	Centre Party
Toivo Pohjala	30 Apr 1987–26 Apr 1991	Holkeri	1458	National Coalition Party
Martti Pura	26 Apr 1991–12 Apr 1994	Aho	1083	Centre Party
Mikko Pesälä	12 Apr 1994–13 Apr 1995	Aho	367	Centre Party
Kalevi Hemilä	13 Apr 1995–15 Apr 1999; 15 Apr 1999–1 February 2002	Lipponen I Lipponen II	2487	Non-Partisan/Independent
Raimo Tammilehto	1 February 2002 – 31 May 2002	Lipponen II	120	Non-Partisan/Independent
Jari Koskinen	31 May 2002–17 Apr 2003; 22 Jun 2011–24 Jun 2014	Lipponen II; Katainen	1421	National Coalition Party
Juha Korkeaoja	17 Apr 2003–24 Jun 2003; 24 Jun 2003–19 Apr 2007	Jäätteenmäki; Vanhanen I	1464	Centre Party
Sirkka-Liisa Anttila	19 Apr 2007–22 Jun 2010; 22 Jun 2010–22 Jun 2011	Vanhanen II; Kiviniemi	1526	Centre Party
Petteri Orpo	24 Jun 2014–29 May 2015	Stubb	341	National Coalition Party
Jari Leppä	5 May 2017-Incumbent	Sipilä		Centre Party

=== Minister of Agriculture and the Environmenti ===
Minister	In Office	Cabinet (Cabinets)	Number of Ministerial days (Total)	Party
Kimmo Tiilikainen	29 May 2015 – 5 May 2017	Sipilä	3717	Centre Party

=== Minister for Europe and immigration ===
Minister	In Office	Cabinet (Cabinets)	Number of Ministerial days (Total)	Party
Astrid Thors	19 Apr 2007–22 Jun 2010; 22 Jun 2010–22 Jun 2011	Vanhanen II; Kiviniemi	1526	Swedish People's Party

=== Master of Agricultural affairs ===
Minister	In Office	Cabinet (Cabinets)	Number of Ministerial days (Total)	Party
Kyösti Kallio	27 Nov 1917–27 May 1918; 27 May 1918–17 Aug 1918	Svinhufvud I Paasikivi I	264	Agrarian League

=== Minister of Agriculture ===
Minister	In Office	Cabinet (Cabinets)	Number of Ministerial days (Total)	Party
Uuno Brander	27 Nov 1918–17 Apr 1919	Ingman I	142	National Progressive Party
Kyösti Kallio	17 Apr 1919–15 Aug 1919; 15 Aug 1919–15 Mar 1920; 9 Apr 1921–2 Jun 1922	U. Castrén; Vennola I Vennola II	754	Agrarian League
Eero Pehkonen	15 Mar 1920–9 Apr 1921	Erich	391	Agrarian League
Östen Elfving	2 Jun 1922–14 Nov 1922; 18 Jan 1924–31 May 1924	Cajander I Cajander II	301	Non-Partisan/Independent
Juho Sunila	14 Nov 1922–18 Jan 1924; 31 Mar 1925–31 Dec 1925; 31 Dec 1925–13 Dec 1926	Kallio I Tulenheimo; Kallio II	1054	Agrarian League
Jalo Lahdensuo	31 May 1924–22 Nov 1924	Ingman II	176	Agrarian League
Ilmari Auer	22 Nov 1924–31 Mar 1925	Ingman II	130	Agrarian League
Mauno Pekkala	13 Dec 1926–17 Dec 1927	Tanner	370	Social Democratic Party
Sigurd Mattsson	17 Dec 1927–22 Dec 1928; 21 Mar 1931–14 Dec 1932	Sunila I Sunila II	1007	Agrarian League
Eemil Linna	22 Dec 1928–16 Aug 1929; 25 Sep 1936–7 Oct 1936	Mantere; Kivimäki	251	National Progressive Party
Kaarle Ellilä	16 Aug 1929–4 Jul 1930	Kallio III	323	Agrarian League
August Raatikainen	4 Jul 1930–21 Mar 1931	Svinhufvud II	261	Agrarian League
Kalle Jutila	14 Dec 1932–25 Sep 1936; 17 Apr 1945–29 Sep 1945; 17 Nov 1953–5 May 1954	Kivimäki; Paasikivi III; Tuomioja	1718	Agrarian League; Agrarian League; Non-Partisan/Independent
Pekka Heikkinen	7 Oct 1936–12 Mar 1937; 12 Mar 1937–1 Dec 1939; 1 Dec 1939–27 Mar 1940; 27 Mar 1940–15 Aug 1940	Kallio IV; Cajander III; Ryti I Ryti II	1409	Agrarian League
Viljami Kalliokoski	15 Aug 1940–4 Jan 1941; 4 Jan 1941–5 Mar 1943; 5 Mar 1943–8 Aug 1944; 8 Aug 1944–21 Sep 1944; 21 Sep 1944–17 Nov 1944; 5 May 1954–20 Oct 1954; 20 Oct 1954–3 Mar 1956	Ryti II; Rangell; Linkomies; Hackzell; U. Castrén; Törngren; Kekkonen V	2225	Agrarian League
Eemil Luukka	17 Nov 1944–17 Apr 1945	Paasikivi II	152	Agrarian League
Vihtori Vesterinen	9 Nov 1945–26 Mar 1946; 26 Mar 1946–29 Jul 1948	Paasikivi III; Pekkala	994	Agrarian League
Matti Lepistö	29 Jul 1948–17 Mar 1950	Fagerholm I	597	Social Democratic Party
Taavi Vilhula	17 Mar 1950–17 Jan 1951	Kekkonen I	307	Agrarian League
Martti Miettunen	17 Jan 1951–20 Sep 1951; 20 Sep 1951–9 Jul 1953; 9 Jul 1953–17 Nov 1953; 3 Mar 1956–27 May 1957; 27 May 1957–2 Jul 1957; 29 Aug 1958–14 Nov 1958; 22 Mar 1968–14 May 1970	Kekkonen II; Kekkonen III; Kekkonen IV; Fagerholm II; Sukselainen I Fagerholm III; Koivisto I	2385	Agrarian League; Agrarian League; Agrarian League; Agrarian League; Agrarian League; Agrarian League; Centre Party
Kustaa Eskola	2 Jul 1957–29 Nov 1957	Sukselainen I	151	Agrarian League
Hans Perttula	29 Nov 1957–26 Apr 1958	Von Fieandt	149	Non-Partisan/Independent
Pauli Lehtosalo	26 Apr 1958–29 Aug 1958	Kuuskoski	126	Non-Partisan/Independent
Urho Kähönen	14 Nov 1958–13 Jan 1959	Fagerholm III	61	Agrarian League
Juho Jaakkola	13 Jan 1959–14 Jul 1961	Sukselainen II	914	Agrarian League
Johannes Virolainen	14 Jul 1961–13 Apr 1962; 13 Apr 1962–18 Dec 1963	Miettunen I Karjalainen I	888	Agrarian League
Samuli Suomela	18 Dec 1963–12 Sep 1964	Lehto	270	Non-Partisan/Independent
Mauno Jussila	12 Sep 1964–27 May 1966	Virolainen	623	Centre Party
Nestori Kaasalainen	27 May 1966–22 Mar 1968; 15 Jul 1970–28 February 1971	Paasio I Karjalainen I	895	Centre Party
Nils Westermarck	14 May 1970–15 Jul 1970	Aura I	63	Non-Partisan/Independent

=== Deputy Minister of People's Service ===
Minister	In Office	Cabinet (Cabinets)	Number of Ministerial days (Total)	Party
Toivo Salmio	3 Oct 1940–4 Jan 1941	Ryti II	94	Social Democratic Party
Henrik Ramsay	29 Oct 1941–3 Jul 1942; 5 Mar 1943–8 Aug 1944	Rangell; Linkomies	771	Swedish People's Party
Siivo Kantala	3 Jul 1942–5 Mar 1943	Rangell	246	Agrarian League
Toivo Ikonen	13 Nov 1942–5 Mar 1943	Rangell	113	Agrarian League
Jalo Aura	5 Mar 1943–8 Aug 1944; 8 Aug 1944–21 Sep 1944; 21 Sep 1944–17 Nov 1944; 17 Nov 1944–17 Apr 1945	Linkomies; Hackzell; U. Castren; Paasikivi II	775	Social Democratic Party
Nils Osara	5 Mar 1943–8 Aug 1944	Linkomies	523	Non-Partisan/Independent
Eero A. Wuori	16 February 1945–17 Apr 1945; 27 Apr 1945–29 Sep 1945	Paasikivi II; Paasikivi III	217	Social Democratic Party
Uuno Takki	17 Apr 1945–26 Mar 1946	Paasikivi III	344	Social Democratic Party
Onni Hiltunen	14 February 1946–26 Mar 1946	Paasikivi III	41	Social Democratic Party
Yrjö Murto	26 Mar 1946–29 Jul 1948	Pekkala	857	People's Democratic League
Erkki Härmä	12 Apr 1946–29 Jul 1948; 30 Jul 1948–22 Jun 1949	Pekkala; Fagerholm I	1168	Social Democratic Party
Eemil Huunonen	29 Jul 1949–17 Mar 1950	Fagerholm I	232	Social Democratic Party

=== Deputy Minister of Trade and Industry ===
Minister	In Office	Cabinet (Cabinets)	Number of Ministerial days (Total)	Party
Uuno Takki	15 Jun 1945–26 Mar 1946	Paasikivi III	285	Social Democratic Party
Onni Toivonen	11 Nov 1949–17 Mar 1950	Fagerholm I	127	Social Democratic Party
Toivo Wiherheimo	17 Nov 1953–5 May 1954; 29 Aug 1958–13 Jan 1959	Tuomioja; Fagerholm III	308	National Coalition Party
Teuvo Aura	2 Sep 1957–29 Nov 1957	Sukselainen I	89	Non-Partisan/Independent
Pauli Lehtosalo	29 Sep 1959–14 Jul 1961; 25 Aug 1961–13 Apr 1962	Sukselainen II; Miettunen I	887	Agrarian League
Aarno Niini	18 Dec 1963–12 Sep 1964	Lehto	270	Non-Partisan/Independent
Väinö Leskinen	22 Mar 1968–14 May 1970	Koivisto I	784	Social Democratic Party
Kalervo Haapasalo	15 Jul 1970–26 Mar 1971	Karjalainen I	255	Social Democratic Party
Olavi J. Mattila	16 Sep 1970–29 Oct 1971	Karjalainen I	409	Non-Partisan/Independent
Olavi Salonen	26 Mar 1971–29 Oct 1971	Karjalainen I	218	Social Democratic Party
Reino Rossi	29 Oct 1971–23 February 1972	Aura II	118	Non-Partisan/Independent
Seppo Lindblom	23 February 1972–4 Sep 1972	Paasio II	195	Social Democratic Party
Jussi Linnamo	4 Sep 1972–5 May 1973	Sorsa I	244	Social Democratic Party
Jermu Laine	5 May 1973–13 Jun 1975; 6 May 1983–30 Apr 1987	Sorsa I Sorsa IV	2226	Social Democratic Party
Jorma Uitto	13 Jun 1975–30 Nov 1975	Liinamaa	171	Non-Partisan/Independent
Sakari T. Lehto	12 Dec 1975–29 Sep 1976	Miettunen II	293	Non-Partisan/Independent
Carl Göran Aminoff	29 Sep 1976–15 May 1977	Miettunen III	229	Swedish People's Party
Johannes Koikkalainen	26 May 1979 – 19 February 1982	Koivisto II	1001	Social Democratic Party
Esko Rekola	26 May 1979 – 19 February 1982; 19 February 1982–31 Dec 1982	Koivisto II; Sorsa III	1316	Non-Partisan/Independent
Matti Ahde	19 February 1982 – 6 May 1983; 6 May 1983–30 Sep 1983	Sorsa III; Sorsa IV	589	Social Democratic Party
Arne Berner	31 Dec 1982–6 May 1983	Sorsa III	127	Liberal People's Party
Pertti Salolainen	30 Apr 1987–26 Apr 1991; 26 Apr 1991–13 Apr 1995	Holkeri; Aho	2906	National Coalition Party
Pekka Vennamo	30 Apr 1987–1 Sep 1989	Holkeri	856	Finnish Rural Party
Ole Norrback	13 Apr 1995–15 Apr 1999	Lipponen I	1464	Swedish People's Party
Kimmo Sasi	15 Apr 1999–4 Jan 2002	Lipponen II	996	National Coalition Party
Jari Vilén	4 Jan 2002–17 Apr 2003	Lipponen II	469	National Coalition Party
Paula Lehtomäki	17 Apr 2003–24 Jun 2003	Jäätteenmäki	69	Centre Party

=== Deputy Minister of Transport and Public Works ===
Minister	In Office	Cabinet (Cabinets)	Number of Ministerial days (Total)	Party
Karl-Erik Ekholm	27 Mar 1940–4 Jan 1941	Ryti II	284	Non-Partisan/Independent
Vilho Annala	4 Jan 1941–5 Mar 1943	Rangell	791	IKL
Toivo Ikonen	5 Mar 1943–13 Jan 1944	Linkomies	315	Agrarian League
Väinö Kaasalainen	13 Jan 1944–8 Aug 1944	Linkomies	209	Agrarian League
Eero Wuori	21 Sep 1944–17 Nov 1944	U. Castrén	58	Social Democratic Party
Onni Hiltunen	17 Nov 1944–17 Apr 1945; 14 February 1946–26 Mar 1946	Paasikivi II; Paasikivi III	193	Social Democratic Party
Yrjö Murto	17 Apr 1945–26 Mar 1946	Paasikivi III	344	People's Democratic League
Kaarlo Hillilä	22 Nov 1945–26 Mar 1946	Paasikivi III	125	Agrarian League
Erkki Härmä	26 Mar 1946–29 Jul 1948; 29 Jul 1948–22 Jun 1949	Pekkala; Fagerholm I	1185	Social Democratic Party
Aarre Simonen	24 Mar 1949–17 Mar 1950	Fagerholm I	359	Social Democratic Party
Eemil Huunonen	29 Jul 1949–17 Mar 1950; 20 Sep 1951–29 Nov 1952; 3 Dec 1952–9 Jul 1953	Fagerholm I Kekkonen III	888	Social Democratic Party
Kauno Kleemola	17 Mar 1950–17 Jan 1951; 17 Jan 1951–20 Sep 1951; 20 Sep 1951–9 Jul 1953	Kekkonen I Kekkonen II; Kekkonen III	1211	Agrarian League
Lauri Riikonen	24 Mar 1950–31 Mar 1950	Kekkonen I	8	Agrarian League
Vihtori Vesterinen	31 Mar 1950–17 Jan 1951	Kekkonen I	293	Agrarian League
Rafael Paasio	17 Jan 1951–20 Sep 1951	Kekkonen II	247	Social Democratic Party
Kustaa Eskola	9 Jul 1953–30 Oct 1953	Kekkonen IV	114	Agrarian League
Aulis Junttila	17 Nov 1953–5 May 1954	Tuomioja	170	Non-Partisan/Independent
Aku Sumu	5 May 1954–20 Oct 1954	Törngren	169	Social Democratic Party
Johannes Tiainen	20 Oct 1954–3 Mar 1956; 3 Mar 1956–27 May 1957	Kekkonen V Fagerholm II	951	Social Democratic Party
Torsten Nordström	27 May 1957–2 Jul 1957	Sukselainen I	37	Swedish People's Party
Kustaa Tiitu	2 Jul 1957–2 Sep 1957	Sukselainen I	63	Agrarian League
Valdemar Liljeström	2 Sep 1957–29 Nov 1957	Sukselainen I	89	Social Democratic Union of Workers and Smallholders
Paavo Kastari	29 Nov 1957–28 February 1958	Von Fieandt	92	Non-Partisan/Independent
Erkki Lindfors	28 February 1958–26 Apr 1958	Von Fieandt	58	Non-Partisan/Independent
Eero Antikainen	26 Apr 1958–29 Aug 1958	Kuuskoski	126	Non-Partisan/Independent
Olavi Lindblom	29 Aug 1958–13 Jan 1959	Fagerholm III	138	Social Democratic Party
Arvo Korsimo	13 Jan 1959–14 Jul 1961	Sukselainen II	914	Agrarian League
Eeli Erkkilä	14 Jul 1961–26 February 1962	Miettunen I	228	Agrarian League
Onni Närvänen	13 Apr 1962–18 Oct 1963	Karjalainen I	554	Social Democratic Union of Workers and Smallholders
Olavi Lahtela	1 Nov 1963–18 Dec 1963	Karjalainen I	48	Agrarian League
Esa Timonen	12 Sep 1964–27 May 1966	Virolainen	623	Centre Party
Niilo Ryhtä	27 May 1966–31 Aug 1967	Paasio I	462	Centre Party
Matti Kekkonen	8 Sep 1967–22 Mar 1968	Paasio I	197	Centre Party
Viljo Virtanen	22 Mar 1968–31 Dec 1969	Koivisto I	650	Social Democratic Party
Veikko Helle	1 Jan 1970–28 February 1970	Koivisto I	59	Social Democratic Party

=== Deputy Minister of Transport ===
Minister	In Office	Cabinet (Cabinets)	Number of Ministerial days (Total)	Party
Anna-Liisa Kasurinen	28 Aug 1990–26 Apr 1991	Holkeri	242	Social Democratic Party

=== Deputy Minister of Agriculture and Forestry ===
Minister	In Office	Cabinet (Cabinets)	Number of Ministerial days (Total)	Party
Veikko Saarto	15 May 1977 – 26 May 1979; 26 May 1979 – 19 February 1982	Sorsa II; Koivisto II	1742	People's Democratic League
Jarmo Wahlström	19 February 1982–31 Dec 1982	Sorsa III	316	People's Democratic League
Matti Ahde	6 May 1983–30 Sep 1983	Sorsa IV	148	Social Democratic Party
Ole Norrback	30 Apr 1987–26 Apr 1991	Holkeri	1458	Swedish People's Party

=== Deputy Minister of Agriculture ===
Minister	In Office	Cabinet (Cabinets)	Number of Ministerial days (Total)	Party
Juho Koivisto	1 Dec 1939–27 Mar 1940; 27 Mar 1940–4 Jan 1941	Ryti I Ryti II	401	Agrarian League
Toivo Ikonen	4 Jan 1941–5 Mar 1943	Rangell	791	Agrarian League
Nils Osara	5 Mar 1943–8 Aug 1944	Linkomies	523	Non-Partisan/Independent
Eemil Luukka	17 Apr 1945–26 Mar 1946; 17 Mar 1950–17 Jan 1951; 20 Sep 1951–9 Jul 1953	Paasikivi III; Kekkonen I Kekkonen III	1310	Agrarian League
Paavo Viding	26 Mar 1946–29 Jul 1948	Pekkala	857	Agrarian League
Jussi Raatikainen	29 Jul 1948–17 Mar 1950	Fagerholm I	597	Social Democratic Party
Matti Lepistö	17 Jan 1951–20 Sep 1951; 20 Sep 1951–29 Nov 1952; 2 Sep 1957–29 Nov 1957; 26 Apr 1958–29 Aug 1958	Kekkonen II; Kekkonen III; Sukselainen I Kuuskoski	898	Social Democratic Party; Social Democratic Party; Social Democratic Party; Non-Partisan/Independent
Johannes Tiainen	3 Dec 1952–9 Jul 1953; 5 May 1954–20 Oct 1954	Kekkonen III; Törngren	388	Social Democratic Party
Henrik Kullberg	17 Nov 1953–4 Dec 1953	Tuomioja	18	Swedish People's Party
Nils Westermarck	18 Dec 1953–5 May 1954	Tuomioja	139	Swedish People's Party
Vieno Simonen	3 Mar 1956–27 May 1957	Fagerholm II	451	Agrarian League
Bertel Lindh	27 May 1957–2 Jul 1957	Sukselainen I	37	Swedish People's Party
Niilo Kosola	29 Aug 1958–13 Jan 1959	Fagerholm III	138	National Coalition Party
Toivo Antila	13 Jan 1959–14 Jul 1961	Sukselainen II	914	Agrarian League
Tahvo Rönkkö	14 Jul 1961–13 Apr 1962	Miettunen I	274	Agrarian League
Verner Korsbäck	13 Apr 1962–18 Dec 1963	Karjalainen I	615	Swedish People's Party
Marja Lahti	12 Sep 1964–27 May 1966	Virolainen	623	Centre Party
Lars Lindeman	27 May 1966–22 Mar 1968	Paasio I	666	Social Democratic Party

=== Deputy Minister for Justice ===
Minister	In Office	Cabinet (Cabinets)	Number of Ministerial days (Total)	Party
Astrid Thors	19 Apr 2007–22 Jun 2010; 22 Jun 2010–22 Jun 2011	Vanhanen II; Kiviniemi	1526	Swedish People's Party

=== Deputy Minister of Education ===
Minister	In Office	Cabinet (Cabinets)	Number of Ministerial days (Total)	Party
Meeri Kalavainen	15 Jul 1970–29 Oct 1971	Karjalainen I	472	Social Democratic Party
Jouko Tyyri	29 Oct 1971–23 February 1972	Aura II	118	Non-Partisan/Independent
Pentti Holappa	23 February 1972–4 Sep 1972	Paasio II	195	Social Democratic Party
Marjatta Väänänen	4 Sep 1972–13 Jun 1975	Sorsa I	1013	Centre Party
Kalevi Kivistö	30 Nov 1975–29 Sep 1976; 15 May 1977 – 26 May 1979; 26 May 1979 – 19 February 1982	Miettunen II; Sorsa II; Koivisto II	2047	People's Democratic League
Kaarina Suonio	19 February 1982–31 Dec 1982	Sorsa III	316	Social Democratic Party
Arvo Salo	31 Dec 1982–6 May 1983	Sorsa III	127	Social Democratic Party
Gustav Björkstrand	6 May 1983–30 Apr 1987	Sorsa IV	1456	Swedish People's Party
Anna-Liisa Kasurinen	30 Apr 1987–26 Apr 1991	Holkeri	1458	Social Democratic Party
Tytti Isohookana-Asunmaa	26 Apr 1991–13 Apr 1995	Aho	1449	Centre Party
Claes Andersson	13 Apr 1995–4 Sep 1998	Lipponen I	1241	Left Alliance
Suvi-Anne Siimes	4 Sep 1998–15 Apr 1999	Lipponen I	224	Left Alliance

=== Deputy Minister of Defence ===
Minister	In Office	Cabinet (Cabinets)	Number of Ministerial days (Total)	Party
Mauno Pekkala	27 Mar 1946–29 Jul 1948	Pekkala	856	People's Democratic League

=== Deputy Minister of Interior ===
Minister	In Office	Cabinet (Cabinets)	Number of Ministerial days (Total)	Party
Eemil Luukka	8 Aug 1944–21 Sep 1944; 21 Sep 1944–17 Nov 1944; 24 Nov 1944–17 Apr 1945; 17 Apr 1945–26 Mar 1946	Hackzell; U. Castrén; Paasikivi II; Paasikivi III	590	Agrarian League
Paavo Viding	26 Mar 1946–29 Jul 1948	Pekkala	857	Agrarian League
Jussi Raatikainen	30 Jul 1948–17 Mar 1950	Fagerholm I	596	Social Democratic Party
Lauri Riikonen	17 Mar 1950–30 Sep 1950	Kekkonen I	198	Agrarian League
Johannes Virolainen	30 Sep 1950–17 Jan 1951	Kekkonen I	110	Agrarian League
Sulo Suorttanen	27 May 1966–22 Mar 1968; 22 Mar 1968–14 May 1970	Paasio I Koivisto I	1449	Centre Party
Mikko Laaksonen	26 Mar 1971–30 Sep 1971	Karjalainen I	189	Social Democratic Party
Jacob Söderman	1 Oct 1971–29 Oct 1971	Karjalainen I	29	Social Democratic Party
Pekka Tarjanne	4 Sep 1972–13 Jun 1975	Sorsa I	1013	Liberal People's Party
Aarno Strömmer	13 Jun 1975–30 Nov 1975	Liinamaa	171	Non-Partisan/Independent
Olavi Hänninen	30 Nov 1975–29 Jun 1976	Miettunen II	213	People's Democratic League
Arvo Hautala	29 Jun 1976–29 Sep 1976	Miettunen II	93	People's Democratic League
Kristian Gestrin	15 May 1977–2 Mar 1978	Sorsa II	292	Swedish People's Party
Tuure Salo	15 May 1977–2 Mar 1978	Sorsa II	292	Liberal People's Party
Eero Rantala	2 Mar 1978–26 May 1979	Sorsa II	451	Social Democratic Party
Johannes Koikkalainen	26 May 1979 – 19 February 1982	Koivisto II	1001	Social Democratic Party
Mikko Jokela	19 February 1982 – 6 May 1983	Sorsa III	442	Centre Party
Matti Luttinen	6 May 1983–30 Sep 1983	Sorsa IV	148	Social Democratic Party
Toivo Yläjärvi	1 Mar 1984–30 Apr 1987	Sorsa IV	1156	Centre Party
Erkki Liikanen	8 May 1987 – 28 February 1990	Holkeri	1028	Social Democratic Party
Matti Puhakka	1 Mar 1990–26 Apr 1991	Holkeri	422	Social Democratic Party
Jouni Backman	13 Apr 1995–15 Apr 1999	Lipponen I	1464	Social Democratic Party
Mari Kiviniemi	19 Apr 2007–1 Jan 2008	Vanhanen II	258	Centre Party
Mauri Pekkarinen	19 Apr 2007–1 Jan 2008	Vanhanen II	258	Centre Party

=== Deputy Minister of Health and Social Affairs ===
Minister	In Office	Cabinet (Cabinets)	Number of Ministerial days (Total)	Party
Alli Lahtinen	14 May 1970–15 Jul 1970	Aura I	63	Non-Partisan/Independent
Katri-Helena Eskelinen	15 Jul 1970–29 Oct 1971; 26 May 1979 – 19 February 1982	Karjalainen I Koivisto II	1473	Centre Party
Arne Berner	22 Jul 1970–29 Oct 1971	Karjalainen I	465	Liberal People's Party
Gunnar Korhonen	29 Oct 1971–23 February 1972	Aura II	118	Non-Partisan/Independent
Ahti Fredriksson	23 February 1972–4 Sep 1972	Paasio II	195	Social Democratic Party
Jussi Linnamo	25 February 1972–4 Sep 1972	Paasio II	193	Social Democratic Party
Pentti Pekkarinen	4 Sep 1972–20 Jan 1975	Sorsa I	869	Centre Party
Reino Karpola	7 February 1975–13 Jun 1975	Sorsa I	127	Centre Party
Grels Teir	13 Jun 1975–30 Nov 1975	Liinamaa	171	Non-Partisan/Independent
Pirkko Työläjärvi	30 Nov 1975–29 Sep 1976	Miettunen II	305	Social Democratic Party
Orvokki Kangas	29 Sep 1976–15 May 1977	Miettunen III	229	Centre Party
Veikko Martikkala	15 May 1977 – 26 May 1979	Sorsa II	742	Centre Party
Johannes Koikkalainen	26 May 1979 – 19 February 1982	Koivisto II	1001	Social Democratic Party
Matti Ahde	19 February 1982 – 6 May 1983; 6 May 1983–30 Apr 1987	Sorsa III; Sorsa IV	1897	Social Democratic Party
Marjatta Väänänen	19 February 1982 – 6 May 1983	Sorsa III	442	Centre Party
Vappu Taipale	6 May 1983–30 Nov 1984	Sorsa IV	575	Social Democratic Party
Matti Puhakka	1 Dec 1984–30 Apr 1987; 30 Apr 1987–31 May 1989	Sorsa IV; Holkeri	1643	Social Democratic Party
Tarja Halonen	30 Apr 1987–28 February 1990	Holkeri	1036	Social Democratic Party
Tuulikki Hämäläinen	1 Mar 1990–26 Apr 1991	Holkeri	422	Social Democratic Party
Toimi Kankaanniemi	26 Apr 1991–28 Jun 1994	Aho	1160	Christian League
Hannele Pokka	3 May 1991 – 17 May 1991	Aho	15	Centre Party
Elisabeth Rehn	17 May 1991–1 Jan 1995	Aho	1326	Swedish People's Party
Jan-Erik Enestam	2 Jan 1995–13 Apr 1995	Lipponen I	102	Swedish People's Party
Terttu Huttu-Juntunen	13 Apr 1995–15 Apr 1999	Lipponen I	1464	Left Alliance
Arja Alho	28 Apr 1995–9 Oct 1997	Lipponen I	896	Social Democratic Party
Jouko Skinnari	9 Oct 1997–15 Apr 1999	Lipponen I	554	Social Democratic Party
Stefan Wallin	19 Apr 2007–22 Jun 2010; 22 Jun 2010–22 Jun 2011	Vanhanen II; Kiviniemi	1526	Swedish People's Party

=== Deputy Minister of Social Affairs ===
Minister	In Office	Cabinet (Cabinets)	Number of Ministerial days (Total)	Party
Yrjö Leino	17 Nov 1944–17 Apr 1945	Paasikivi II	152	People's Democratic League
Eero Wuori	16 February 1945–17 Apr 1945; 27 Apr 1945–29 Sep 1945	Paasikivi II; Paasikivi III	217	Social Democratic Party
Matti Janhunen	17 Apr 1945–26 Mar 1946	Paasikivi III	344	People's Democratic League
Kaarlo Hillilä	22 Nov 1945–26 Mar 1946	Paasikivi III	125	Agrarian League
Onni Hiltunen	14 February 1946–26 Mar 1946	Paasikivi III	41	Social Democratic Party
Lennart Heljas	26 Mar 1946–26 May 1948	Pekkala	793	Agrarian League
Erkki Härmä	12 Apr 1946–29 Jul 1948; 30 Jul 1948–22 Jun 1949	Pekkala; Fagerholm I	1168	Social Democratic Party
Onni Peltonen	26 May 1948–29 Jul 1948	Pekkala	65	Social Democratic Party
Tyyne Leivo-Larsson	29 Jul 1948–17 Mar 1950; 20 Oct 1954–3 Mar 1956; 3 Mar 1956–17 May 1957; 2 May 1958–29 Aug 1958	Fagerholm I Kekkonen V Kekkonen II; Kuuskoski	1658	Social Democratic Party; Social Democratic Party; Social Democratic Party; Non-Partisan/Independent
Eemil Huunonen	29 Jul 1949–17 Mar 1950; 17 Jan 1951–20 Sep 1951; 20 Sep 1951–9 Jul 1953	Fagerholm I Kekkonen II; Kekkonen III	1137	Social Democratic Party
Vihtori Vesterinen	17 Mar 1950–17 Jan 1951	Kekkonen I	307	Agrarian League
Kauno Kleemola	24 Mar 1950–30 Sep 1950	Kekkonen I	191	Agrarian League
Teuvo Aura	30 Sep 1950–17 Jan 1951; 30 Sep 1950–17 Jan 1951	Kekkonen I	110	National Progressive Party
Rafael Paasio	17 Jan 1951–20 Sep 1951; 29 Aug 1958–13 Jan 1959	Kekkonen II; Fagerholm III	385	Social Democratic Party
Lauri Murtomaa	20 Sep 1951–9 Jul 1953	Kekkonen III	659	Agrarian League
Vieno Simonen	9 Jul 1953–17 Nov 1953; 5 May 1954–20 Oct 1954	Kekkonen IV; Törngren	301	Agrarian League
Päiviö Hetemäki	17 Nov 1953–5 May 1954	Tuomioja	170	National Coalition Party
Irma Karvikko	17 Nov 1953–5 May 1954	Tuomioja	170	People's Party
Aku Sumu	7 May 1954–20 Oct 1954	Törngren	167	Social Democratic Party
Johannes Tiainen	22 Oct 1954–3 Mar 1956; 5 Mar 1956–27 May 1957	Kekkonen V Fagerholm II	948	Social Democratic Party
Atte Pakkanen	27 May 1957–2 Sep 1957	Sukselainen I	99	Agrarian League
Pekka Malinen	2 Jul 1957–2 Sep 1957	Sukselainen I	63	People's Party
Olli J. Uoti	2 Sep 1957–29 Nov 1957	Sukselainen I	89	Social Democratic Union of Workers and Smallholders
Erkki Lindfors	30 Dec 1957–26 Apr 1958	Von Fieandt	118	Non-Partisan/Independent
Eeli Erkkilä	13 Jan 1959–14 Jul 1961	Sukselainen II	914	Agrarian League
Mauno Jussila	14 Jul 1961–13 Apr 1962	Miettunen I	274	Agrarian League
Kyllikki Pohjala	13 Apr 1962–18 Oct 1963	Karjalainen I	554	National Coalition Party
Magnus Kull	18 Dec 1963–12 Sep 1964	Lehto	270	Non-Partisan/Independent
Kaarle Sorkio	12 Sep 1964–27 May 1966	Virolainen	623	Non-Partisan/Independent
Esa Timonen	27 May 1966–31 Aug 1967	Paasio I	462	Centre Party
Toivo Saloranta	8 Sep 1967–22 Mar 1968	Paasio I	197	Centre Party
Eemil Partanen	2 Apr 1968–14 May 1970	Koivisto I	773	Centre Party

=== Deputy Minister of Employment ===
Minister	In Office	Cabinet (Cabinets)	Number of Ministerial days (Total)	Party
Terttu Huttu-Juntunen	13 Apr 1995–31 Mar 1997	Lipponen I	719	Left Alliance
Liisa Hyssälä	19 Apr 2007–1 Jan 2008	Vanhanen II	258	Centre Party
Astrid Thors	19 Apr 2007–1 Jan 2008	Vanhanen II	258	Swedish People's Party

=== Deputy Minister of Foreign ===
Minister	In Office	Cabinet (Cabinets)	Number of Ministerial days (Total)	Party
Henrik Ramsay	14 Nov 1941–5 Mar 1943	Rangell	477	Swedish People's Party
Ilmari Martola	21 Sep 1944–17 Nov 1944	U. Castren	58	Non-Partisan/Independent
Reinhold Svento	17 Nov 1944–17 Apr 1945; 17 Apr 1945–26 Mar 1946; 26 Mar 1946–30 Apr 1948	Paasikivi II; Paasikivi III; Pekkala	1261	Social Democratic Party; Social Democratic Party; People's Democratic League
Åke Gartz	27 Apr 1945–26 Mar 1946	Paasikivi III	334	Non-Partisan/Independent
Uuno Takki	27 Mar 1946–29 Jul 1948; 30 Jul 1948–17 Mar 1950	Pekkala; Fagerholm I	1452	Social Democratic Party
Sakari Tuomioja	17 Mar 1950–17 Jan 1951	Kekkonen I	307	National Progressive Party
Ralf Törngren	26 Nov 1952–9 Jul 1953	Kekkonen III	226	Swedish People's Party
Teuvo Aura	17 Nov 1953–5 May 1954	Tuomioja	170	Non-Partisan/Independent
Ahti Karjalainen	13 Jan 1959–19 Jun 1961	Sukselainen II	889	Agrarian League
Olavi J. Mattila	1 Nov 1963–18 Dec 1963; 18 Dec 1963–12 Sep 1964; 16 Sep 1970–29 Oct 1971	Karjalainen I Lehto; Karjalainen I	726	Non-Partisan/Independent
Reino Rossi	29 Oct 1971–23 February 1972	Aura II	118	Non-Partisan/Independent
Jussi Linnamo	23 February 1972–4 Sep 1972; 4 Sep 1972–5 May 1973	Paasio II; Sorsa I	438	Social Democratic Party
Jermu Laine	5 May 1973–13 Jun 1975; 6 May 1983–30 Apr 1987	Sorsa I Sorsa IV	2226	Social Democratic Party
Arvo Rytkönen	23 Jun 1975–30 Nov 1975	Liinamaa	161	Non-Partisan/Independent
Sakari Lehto	12 Dec 1975–29 Sep 1976	Miettunen II	293	Non-Partisan/Independent
Carl Göran Aminoff	29 Sep 1976–15 May 1977	Miettunen III	229	Swedish People's Party
Esko Rekola	26 May 1979 – 19 February 1982; 19 February 1982–31 Dec 1982	Koivisto II; Sorsa III	1316	Non-Partisan/Independent
Arne Berner	31 Dec 1982–6 May 1983	Sorsa III	127	Liberal People's Party
Pertti Salolainen	30 Apr 1987–26 Apr 1991; 26 Apr 1991–13 Apr 1995	Holkeri; Aho	2906	National Coalition Party
Ilkka Suominen	30 Apr 1987–26 Apr 1991	Holkeri	1458	National Coalition Party
Toimi Kankaanniemi	26 Apr 1991–28 Jun 1994	Aho	1160	Christian League
Kauko Juhantalo	3 May 1991–3 Aug 1992	Aho	459	Centre Party
Pekka Tuomisto	3 Aug 1992–31 Jul 1993	Aho	363	Centre Party
Seppo Kääriäinen	1 Aug 1993–13 Apr 1995	Aho	621	Centre Party
Pekka Haavisto	13 Apr 1995–15 Apr 1999	Lipponen I	1464	Green League
Ole Norrback	13 Apr 1995–15 Apr 1999	Lipponen I	1464	Swedish People's Party
Jan-Erik Enestam	15 Apr 1999–17 Apr 2003; 17 Apr 2003–24 Jun 2003; 24 Jun 2003–31 Dec 2006	Lipponen II; Jäätteenmäki; Vanhanen I	2818	Swedish People's Party
Satu Hassi	15 Apr 1999–31 May 2002	Lipponen II	1143	Green League
Suvi-Anne Siimes	31 May 2002–17 Apr 2003	Lipponen II	322	Left Alliance
Stefan Wallin	1 Jan 2007–19 Apr 2007	Vanhanen I	109	Swedish People's Party
Jan Vapaavuori	1 Jun 2007–22 Jun 2010; 22 Jun 2010–22 Jun 2011	Vanhanen II; Kiviniemi	1483	National Coalition Party

=== Minister at Council of State ===
Minister	In Office	Cabinet (Cabinets)	Number of Ministerial days (Total)	Party
Mauno Pekkala	24 Nov 1944–17 Apr 1945; 27 Apr 1945–26 Mar 1946	Paasikivi II; Paasikivi III	479	Social Democratic Party; People's Democratic League
Eero Wuori	7 Aug 1945–29 Sep 1945	Paasikivi III	54	Social Democratic Party
Eino Kilpi	15 Sep 1945–26 Mar 1946	Paasikivi III	193	Social Democratic Party
Yrjö Kallinen	26 Mar 1946–4 Jun 1948	Pekkala	802	Social Democratic Party
Hertta Kuusinen	4 Jun 1948–29 Jul 1948	Pekkala	56	People's Democratic League
Aleksi Aaltonen	29 Jul 1948–18 Mar 1949	Fagerholm I	233	Social Democratic Party
Johannes Virolainen	17 Jan 1951–20 Sep 1951; 3 Mar 1956–27 May 1957	Kekkonen II; Fagerholm II	698	Agrarian League
Aarre Simonen	2 Sep 1957–31 Oct 1957	Sukselainen I	60	Social Democratic Union of Workers and Smallholders
Tyyne Leivo-Larsson	26 Apr 1958–29 Aug 1958	Kuuskoski	126	Non-Partisan/Independent
Olavi J. Mattila	1 Nov 1963–18 Dec 1963; 16 Sep 1970–29 Oct 1971	Karjalainen I Karjalainen I	457	Non-Partisan/Independent
Aarne Nuorvala	18 Dec 1963–8 Jun 1964	Lehto	174	Non-Partisan/Independent
Jussi Linnamo	22 Mar 1968–31 Jan 1970	Koivisto I	681	Social Democratic Party
Margit Eskman	1 February 1970 – 14 May 1970	Koivisto I	103	Social Democratic Party
Esa Timonen	2 Nov 1971–23 February 1972	Aura II	114	Non-Partisan/Independent
Matti Louekoski	23 February 1972–4 Sep 1972; 4 Sep 1972–13 Jun 1975	Paasio II	1207	Social Democratic Party
Kaarlo Ahtiala	13 Jun 1975–30 Nov 1975	Liinamaa	171	Non-Partisan/Independent
Reino Karpola	30 Nov 1975–29 Sep 1976	Miettunen II	305	Centre Party
Ahti Karjalainen	29 Sep 1976–15 May 1977	Miettunen III	229	Centre Party
Esko Rekola	15 May 1977 – 26 May 1979	Sorsa II	742	Non-Partisan/Independent
Eino Uusitalo	26 May 1979 – 19 February 1982	Koivisto II	1001	Centre Party
Mikko Jokela	19 February 1982 – 6 May 1983	Sorsa III	442	Centre Party
Toivo Yläjärvi	6 May 1983 – 29 February 1984	Sorsa IV	300	Centre Party
Ilkka Kanerva	30 Apr 1987–28 Aug 1990	Holkeri	1217	National Coalition Party
Arja Alho	13 Apr 1995–9 Oct 1997	Lipponen I	911	Social Democratic Party
Ole Norrback	13 Apr 1995–15 Apr 1999	Lipponen I	1464	Swedish People's Party
Jouko Skinnari	9 Oct 1997–15 Apr 1999	Lipponen I	554	Social Democratic Party
Kimmo Sasi	1 Jul 2000–4 Jan 2002	Lipponen II	553	National Coalition Party
Jari Vilén	4 Jan 2002–17 Apr 2003	Lipponen II	469	National Coalition Party
Paula Lehtomäki	17 Apr 2003–24 Jun 2003; 24 Jun 2003–2 Sep 2005; 3 Mar 2006–19 Apr 2007	Jäätteenmäki; Vanhanen I Vanhanen II	1283	Centre Party
Mari Kiviniemi	2 Sep 2005–3 Mar 2006	Vanhanen I	183	Centre Party
Astrid Thors	19 Apr 2007–22 Jun 2010; 22 Jun 2010–22 Jun 2011	Vanhanen II; Kiviniemi	1526	Swedish People's Party
Jyri Häkämies	1 May 2007–22 Jun 2010; 22 Jun 2010–22 Jun 2011	Vanhanen II; Kiviniemi	1514	National Coalition Party
Jan Vapaavuori	30 Mar 2010–22 Jun 2010; 22 Jun 2010–22 Jun 2011	Vanhanen II; Kiviniemi	450	National Coalition Party

=== Deputy Minister of Finance ===
Minister	In Office	Cabinet (Cabinets)	Number of Ministerial days (Total)	Party
Juho Pilppula	31 Jul 1940–4 Jan 1941	Ryti II	158	Agrarian League
Juho Koivisto	4 Jan 1941–5 Mar 1943	Rangell	791	Agrarian League
Tyko Reinikka	5 Mar 1943–8 Aug 1944	Linkomies	523	Agrarian League
Olli Paloheimo	8 Aug 1944–21 Sep 1944	Hackzell	45	National Coalition Party
Sakari Tuomioja	17 Nov 1944–17 Apr 1945	Paasikivi II	152	National Progressive Party
Onni Hiltunen	17 Apr 1945–26 Mar 1946; 26 Mar 1946–29 Jul 1948	Paasikivi III; Pekkala	1200	Social Democratic Party
Aleksi Aaltonen	30 Jul 1948–18 Mar 1949	Fagerholm I	232	Social Democratic Party
Unto Varjonen	19 Aug 1949–17 Mar 1950	Fagerholm I	211	Social Democratic Party
Nils Meinander	17 Mar 1950–17 Jan 1951; 9 Jul 1953–17 Nov 1953	Kekkonen I Kekkonen IV	439	Swedish People's Party
Ralf Törngren	17 Jan 1951–20 Sep 1951	Kekkonen II	247	Swedish People's Party
Matti Miikki	20 Sep 1951–9 Jul 1953	Kekkonen III	659	Agrarian League
Esa Kaitila	17 Nov 1953–5 May 1954	Tuomioja	170	People's Party
Martti Miettunen	7 May 1954–20 Oct 1954	Törngren	167	Agrarian League
Veikko Vennamo	20 Oct 1954–3 Mar 1956	Kekkonen V	501	Agrarian League
Mauno Jussila	3 Mar 1956–27 May 1957; 29 Aug 1958–13 Jan 1959; 1 Nov 1963–13 Dec 1963	Fagerholm II; Fagerholm III; Karjalainen I	632	Agrarian League
Vihtori Sarjala	27 May 1957–2 Jul 1957	Sukselainen I	37	Agrarian League
Ahti Karjalainen	2 Jul 1957–2 Sep 1957; 29 Nov 1957–31 Mar 1958	Sukselainen I Von Fieandt	186	Agrarian League; Non-Partisan/Independent
Pekka Malinen	2 Sep 1957–29 Nov 1957	Sukselainen I	89	People's Party
Teuvo Aura	11 Oct 1957–29 Nov 1957	Sukselainen I	50	Non-Partisan/Independent
Pauli Lehtosalo	13 Jan 1959–14 Apr 1961	Sukselainen II	823	Agrarian League
Juho Niemi	14 Apr 1961–14 Jul 1961; 14 Jul 1961–13 Apr 1962	Sukselainen II; Miettunen I	365	Agrarian League
Onni Koski	13 Apr 1962–18 Oct 1963	Karjalainen I	554	Social Democratic Union of Workers and Smallholders
Johan Otto Söderhjelm	21 Sep 1962–1 Nov 1963	Karjalainen I	407	Swedish People's Party
Heikki Tuominen	18 Dec 1963–12 Sep 1964; 30 Sep 1974–13 Jun 1975	Lehto; Sorsa I	527	Non-Partisan/Independent
Erkki Huurtamo	12 Sep 1964–27 May 1966	Virolainen	623	National Coalition Party
Ele Alenius	27 May 1966–22 Mar 1968; 22 Mar 1968–14 May 1970	Paasio I Koivisto I	1449	People's Democratic League
Keijo Liinamaa	26 May 1970–15 Jul 1970	Aura I	51	Non-Partisan/Independent
Valto Käkelä	15 Jul 1970–29 Oct 1971	Karjalainen I	472	Social Democratic Party
Jorma Uitto	29 Oct 1971–23 February 1972	Aura II	118	Non-Partisan/Independent
Margit Eskman	23 February 1972 – 31 May 1972	Paasio II	99	Social Democratic Party
Seija Karkinen	31 May 1972–4 Sep 1972	Paasio II	97	Social Democratic Party
Esko Niskanen	4 Sep 1972–13 Jun 1975	Sorsa I	1013	Social Democratic Party
Teuvo Varjas	13 Jun 1975–30 Nov 1975	Liinamaa	171	Non-Partisan/Independent
Viljo Luukka	30 Nov 1975–9 Apr 1976	Miettunen II	132	Non-Partisan/Independent
Esko Rekola	9 Apr 1976–29 Sep 1976; 15 May 1977 – 26 May 1979	Miettunen II; Sorsa II	916	Non-Partisan/Independent
Jouko Loikkanen	29 Sep 1976–15 May 1977	Miettunen III	229	Centre Party
Pirkko Työläjärvi	26 May 1979–30 Jun 1981	Koivisto II	767	Social Democratic Party
Mauno Forsman	1 Jul 1981–19 February 1982; 19 February 1982–15 Sep 1982	Koivisto II; Sorsa III	442	Social Democratic Party
Jermu Laine	15 Sep 1982–6 May 1983	Sorsa III	234	Social Democratic Party
Pekka Vennamo	6 May 1983–30 Apr 1987	Sorsa IV	1456	Finnish Rural Party
Ulla Puolanne	30 Apr 1987–26 Apr 1991	Holkeri	1458	National Coalition Party
Ilkka Kanerva	3 February 1989–26 Apr 1991; 26 Apr 1991–13 Apr 1995	Holkeri; Aho	2261	National Coalition Party
Arja Alho	13 Apr 1995–9 Oct 1997	Lipponen I	911	Social Democratic Party
Jouni Backman	13 Apr 1995–15 Apr 1999	Lipponen I	1464	Social Democratic Party
Jouko Skinnari	9 Oct 1997–15 Apr 1999	Lipponen I	554	Social Democratic Party

=== Deputy Minister of Environment ===
Minister	In Office	Cabinet (Cabinets)	Number of Ministerial days (Total)	Party
Pirjo Rusanen	26 Apr 1991–2 Jan 1995	Aho	1348	National Coalition Party
Anneli Taina	2 Jan 1995–13 Apr 1995	Aho	102	National Coalition Party
Sinikka Mönkäre	13 Apr 1995–15 Apr 1999	Lipponen I	1464	Social Democratic Party
Suvi-Anne Siimes	15 Apr 1999–17 Apr 2003	Lipponen II	1464	Left Alliance
Hannes Manninen	17 Apr 2003–24 Jun 2003; 24 Jun 2003–19 Apr 2007	Jäätteenmäki; Vanhanen I	1464	Centre Party
Paula Risikko	19 Apr 2007–1 Jan 2008	Vanhanen II	258	National Coalition Party

=== Minister of Justice ===
Minister	In Office	Cabinet (Cabinets)	Number of Ministerial days (Total)	Party
Karl Söderholm	27 Nov 1918–17 Apr 1919; 17 Apr 1919–15 Aug 1919; 15 Mar 1920–28 Jun 1920; 4 Jul 1930–21 Mar 1931	Ingman I K.Castrén; Erich; Svinhufvud II	629	Swedish People's Party
Henrik Kahelin	15 Aug 1919–30 Jan 1920	Vennola I	169	National Progressive Party
Hjalmar Granfelt	28 Jun 1920–9 Apr 1921	Erich	286	Swedish People's Party
Heimo Helminen	9 Apr 1921–24 February 1922	Vennola II	322	National Progressive Party
Albert von Hellens	24 February 1922–2 Jun 1922; 31 May 1924–31 Mar 1925	Vennola II; Ingman II	404	National Progressive Party
Oskar Lilius	2 Jun 1922–14 Nov 1922; 18 Jan 1924–31 May 1924; 31 Mar 1925–31 Dec 1925	Cajander I Cajander II; Tulenheimo	577	Non-Partisan/Independent
Otto Åkesson	14 Nov 1922–21 Dec 1923	Kallio I	403	Agrarian League
Elias Sopanen	21 Dec 1923–18 Jan 1924	Kallio I	29	National Progressive Party
Urho Castrén	31 Dec 1925–13 Dec 1926	Kallio II	348	National Coalition Party
Väinö Hakkila	13 Dec 1926–17 Dec 1927	Tanner	370	Social Democratic Party
Torsten Malinen	17 Dec 1927–22 Dec 1928	Sunila I	372	Non-Partisan/Independent
Anton Kotonen	22 Dec 1928–18 February 1929	Mantere	59	Non-Partisan/Independent
Oiva Huttunen	18 February 1929–16 Aug 1929	Mantere	180	Non-Partisan/Independent
Elieser Kaila	16 Aug 1929–4 Jul 1930	Kallio III	323	Agrarian League
Toivo Kivimäki	21 Mar 1931–14 Dec 1932	Sunila II	635	National Progressive Party
Hugo Malmberg	14 Dec 1932–27 February 1933	Kivimäki	76	Swedish People's Party
Eric Johan Serlachius	27 February 1933 – 28 February 1936	Kivimäki	1097	Swedish People's Party
Emil Jatkola	6 Mar 1936–7 Oct 1936	Kivimäki	216	National Progressive Party
Urho Kekkonen	7 Oct 1936–12 Mar 1937; 17 Nov 1944–17 Apr 1945; 17 Apr 1945–26 Mar 1946; 20 Sep 1951–22 Sep 1951	Kallio IV; Paasikivi I Paasikivi III; Kekkonen III	655	Agrarian League
Arvi Ahmavaara	18 Mar 1937–11 Jan 1938	Cajander III	300	Non-Partisan/Independent
Albin Ewald Rautavaara	11 Jan 1938–13 Oct 1939	Cajander III	641	Non-Partisan/Independent
Johan Otto Söderhjelm	13 Oct 1939–1 Dec 1939; 1 Dec 1939–27 Mar 1940; 2 Sep 1957–29 Nov 1957; 26 Apr 1958–29 Aug 1958; 13 Apr 1962–18 Dec 1963; 12 Sep 1964–27 May 1966	Cajander III; Ryti I Sukselainen I Kuuskoski; Karjalainen I Virolainen	1620	Swedish People's Party; Swedish People's Party; Non-Partisan/Independent; Non-Partisan/Independent; Swedish People's Party; Swedish People's Party
Oskari Lehtonen	27 Mar 1940–4 Jan 1941; 4 Jan 1941–5 Mar 1943; 5 Mar 1943–8 Aug 1944	Ryti II; Rangell; Linkomies	1596	National Coalition Party
Ernst von Born	8 Aug 1944–21 Sep 1944; 21 Sep 1944–17 Nov 1944	Hackzell; U. Castrén	102	Swedish People's Party
Eino Pekkala	26 Mar 1946–29 Jul 1948	Pekkala	857	People's Democratic League
Tauno Suontausta	29 Jul 1948–17 Mar 1950	Fagerholm I	597	Social Democratic Party
Heikki Kannisto	17 Mar 1950–17 Jan 1951	Kekkonen I	307	National Progressive Party
Teuvo Aura	17 Jan 1951–20 Sep 1951	Kekkonen II	247	National Progressive Party
Sven Högström	22 Sep 1951–9 Jul 1953; 9 Jul 1953–17 Nov 1953; 29 Aug 1958–13 Jan 1959	Kekkonen III; Kekkonen IV; Fagerholm III	926	Swedish People's Party
Reino Kuuskoski	17 Nov 1953–5 May 1954	Tuomioja	170	Non-Partisan/Independent
Yrjö Puhakka	5 May 1954–20 Oct 1954	Törngren	169	Non-Partisan/Independent
Aarre Simonen	20 Oct 1954–6 Nov 1954; 27 May 1966–22 Mar 1968; 22 Mar 1968–14 May 1970	Kekkonen V Paasio I Koivisto I	1467	Social Democratic Party; Social Democratic Union of Workers and Smallholders; Social Democratic Union of Workers and Smallholders
Weio Henriksson	6 Nov 1954–3 Mar 1956	Kekkonen V	484	Non-Partisan/Independent
Vilho Väyrynen	3 Mar 1956–2 May 1956	Fagerholm II	61	Social Democratic Party
Arvo Helminen	2 May 1956 – 27 May 1957; 27 May 1957–2 Sep 1957	Fagerholm II; Sukselainen I	489	Non-Partisan/Independent
Kurt Kaira	29 Nov 1957–26 Apr 1958	Von Fieandt	149	Non-Partisan/Independent
Antti Hannikainen	13 Jan 1959–14 Apr 1961	Sukselainen II	823	Agrarian League
Pauli Lehtosalo	14 Apr 1961–14 Jul 1961; 14 Jul 1961–13 Apr 1962	Sukselainen II; Miettunen I	365	Agrarian League
Olavi Merimaa	18 Dec 1963–12 Sep 1964	Lehto	270	Non-Partisan/Independent
Keijo Liinamaa	14 May 1970–15 Jul 1970	Aura I	63	Non-Partisan/Independent
Erkki Tuominen	15 Jul 1970–26 Mar 1971	Karjalainen I	255	People's Democratic League
Mikko Laaksonen	26 Mar 1971–30 Sep 1971	Karjalainen I	189	Social Democratic Party
Jacob Söderman	1 Oct 1971–29 Oct 1971	Karjalainen I	29	Social Democratic Party
Karl Lång	29 Oct 1971–23 February 1972	Aura II	118	Non-Partisan/Independent
Pekka Paavola	23 February 1972–4 Sep 1972	Paasio II	195	Social Democratic Party
Matti Louekoski	4 Sep 1972–13 Jun 1975; 30 Apr 1987–28 February 1990	Sorsa I Holkeri	2049	Social Democratic Party
Inkeri Anttila	13 Jun 1975–30 Nov 1975	Liinamaa	171	Non-Partisan/Independent
Kristian Gestrin	30 Nov 1975–29 Sep 1976; 29 Sep 1976–15 May 1977	Miettunen II; Miettunen III	533	Swedish People's Party
Tuure Salo	15 May 1977–2 Mar 1978	Sorsa II	292	Liberal People's Party
Paavo Nikula	2 Mar 1978–26 May 1979	Sorsa II	292	Liberal People's Party
Christoffer Taxell	26 May 1979 – 19 February 1982; 19 February 1982 – 6 May 1983; 6 May 1983–30 Apr 1987	Koivisto II; Sorsa III; Sorsa IV	2897	Swedish People's Party
Tarja Halonen	1 Mar 1990–26 Apr 1991	Holkeri	422	Social Democratic Party
Hannele Pokka	26 Apr 1991–30 Apr 1994	Aho	1101	Centre Party
Anneli Jäätteenmäki	1 May 1994–13 Apr 1995	Aho	348	Centre Party
Sauli Niinistö	13 Apr 1995–2 February 1996	Lipponen I	296	National Coalition Party
Kari Häkämies	2 February 1996–13 Mar 1998	Lipponen I	771	National Coalition Party
Jussi Järventaus	13 Mar 1998–15 Apr 1999	Lipponen I	399	National Coalition Party
Johannes Koskinen	15 Apr 1999–17 Apr 2003; 17 Apr 2003–24 Jun 2003; 24 Jun 2003–23 Sep 2005	Lipponen I Jäätteenmäki; Vanhanen I	2354	Social Democratic Party
Leena Luhtanen	23 Sep 2005–19 Apr 2007	Vanhanen I	574	Social Democratic Party
Tuija Brax	19 Apr 2007–22 Jun 2010; 22 Jun 2010–22 Jun 2011	Vanhanen II; Kiviniemi	1526	Green League
Anna-Maja Henriksson	22 Jun 2011–24 Jun 2014; 24 Jun 2014–29 May 2015	Katainen; Stubb	1344	Swedish People's Party
Jari Lindström	5 May 2017 –Incumbent	Sipilä		True Finns

=== Minister of Justice and Employment ===
Minister	In Office	Cabinet (Cabinets)	Number of Ministerial days (Total)	Party
Jari Lindström	29 May 2015 – 5 May 2017	Sipilä	3717	True Finns

=== Master of Justice affairs ===
Minister	In Office	Cabinet (Cabinets)	Number of Ministerial days (Total)	Party
Onni Talas	27 Nov 1917–27 May 1918; 27 May 1918–27 Nov 1918	Svinhufvud I Paasikivi I	366	Young Finnish Party

=== Minister of Education ===
Minister	In Office	Cabinet (Cabinets)	Number of Ministerial days (Total)	Party
Yrjö Loimaranta	2 Jun 1922–14 Nov 1922; 18 Jan 1924–31 May 1924	Cajander I Cajander II	301	Non-Partisan/Independent
Niilo Liakka	14 Nov 1922–18 Jan 1924	Kallio I	431	Agrarian League
Lauri Ingman	31 May 1924–31 Mar 1925; 31 Dec 1925–13 Dec 1926; 22 Dec 1928–16 Aug 1929	Ingman II; Kallio II; Mantere	891	National Coalition Party; National Coalition Party; Non-Partisan/Independent
Emil Nestor Setälä	31 Mar 1925–31 Dec 1925	Tulenheimo	276	National Coalition Party
Julius Ailio	13 Dec 1926–17 Dec 1927	Tanner	370	Social Democratic Party
Antti Kukkonen	17 Dec 1927–22 Dec 1928; 16 Aug 1929–4 Jul 1930; 21 Mar 1931–14 Dec 1932; 7 Oct 1936–12 Mar 1937; 27 Mar 1940–4 Jan 1941; 4 Jan 1941–5 Mar 1943	Sunila I Kallio III; Sunila II; Kallio IV; Ryti II; Rangell	2561	Agrarian League
Paavo Virkkunen	4 Jul 1930–21 Mar 1931	Svinhufvud II	261	National Coalition Party
Oskari Mantere	14 Dec 1932–7 Oct 1936	Kivimäki	1394	National Progressive Party
Uuno Hannula	12 Mar 1937–1 Dec 1939; 1 Dec 1939–27 Mar 1940	Cajander III; Ryti I	1112	Agrarian League
Kalle Kauppi	5 Mar 1943–8 Aug 1944; 8 Aug 1944–21 Sep 1944; 21 Sep 1944–17 Nov 1944	Linkomies; Hackzell; U. Castrén	624	National Progressive Party
Uuno Takki	17 Nov 1944–17 Apr 1945	Paasikivi I	152	Social Democratic Party
Johan Helo	17 Apr 1945–28 Dec 1945	Paasikivi III	256	People's Democratic League
Eino Pekkala	28 Dec 1945–26 Mar 1946	Paasikivi III	89	People's Democratic League
Eino Kilpi	26 Mar 1946–26 May 1948	Pekkala	793	Social Democratic Party
Lennart Heljas	26 May 1948–29 Jul 1948; 17 Mar 1950–17 Jan 1951; 17 Jan 1951–20 Sep 1951	Pekkala; Kekkonen I Kekkonen II	618	Agrarian League
Reino Oittinen	29 Jul 1948–17 Mar 1950; 20 Sep 1951–9 Jul 1953; 29 Nov 1957–26 Apr 1958; 18 Dec 1963–12 Sep 1964; 27 May 1966–22 Mar 1968	Fagerholm I Kekkonen III; Von Fieandt; Lehto; Paasio I	2341	Social Democratic Party; Social Democratic Party; Non-Partisan/Independent; Non-Partisan/Independent; Social Democratic Party
Johannes Virolainen	9 Jul 1953–17 Nov 1953; 5 May 1954–20 Oct 1954; 3 Mar 1956–27 May 1957; 22 Mar 1968–14 May 1970	Kekkonen IV; Törngren; Fagerholm II; Koivisto I	1536	Agrarian League/Centre Party
Arvo Salminen	17 Nov 1953–5 May 1954	Tuomioja	170	National Coalition Party
Kerttu Saalasti	20 Oct 1954–3 Mar 1956; 27 May 1957–29 Nov 1957	Kekkonen V Sukselainen I	688	Agrarian League
Kustaa Vilkuna	26 Apr 1958–29 Aug 1958	Kuuskoski	126	Non-Partisan/Independent
Kaarlo Kajatsalo	29 Aug 1958–13 Jan 1959	Fagerholm III	138	People's Party
Heikki Hosia	13 Jan 1959–14 Jul 1961; 14 Jul 1961–13 Apr 1962	Sukselainen II; Miettunen I	1187	Agrarian League
Armi Hosia	13 Apr 1962–18 Dec 1963	Karjalainen I	615	People's Party
Jussi Saukkonen	12 Sep 1964–27 May 1966	Virolainen	623	National Coalition Party
Jaakko Numminen	14 May 1970–15 Jul 1970	Aura I	63	Non-Partisan/Independent
Jaakko Itälä	15 Jul 1970–29 Oct 1971; 2 Mar 1978–26 May 1979	Karjalainen I Sorsa II	923	Liberal People's Party
Matti Louekoski	29 Oct 1971–23 February 1972	Aura II	118	Non-Partisan/Independent
Ulf Sundqvist	23 February 1972–4 Sep 1972; 4 Sep 1972–31 May 1974; 9 Sep 1974–13 Jun 1975	Paasio II; Sorsa I Sorsa I	1107	Social Democratic Party
Varma Kallio	1 Jun 1974–9 Sep 1974	Sorsa I	101	Social Democratic Party
Lauri Posti	13 Jun 1975–30 Nov 1975	Liinamaa	171	Non-Partisan/Independent
Paavo Väyrynen	30 Nov 1975–29 Sep 1976	Miettunen II	305	Centre Party
Marjatta Väänänen	29 Sep 1976–15 May 1977	Miettunen II	229	Centre Party
Kristian Gestrin	15 May 1977–2 Mar 1978	Sorsa II	292	Swedish People's Party
Pär Stenbäck	26 May 1979 – 19 February 1982	Koivisto II	1001	Swedish People's Party
Kalevi Kivistö	19 February 1982–31 Dec 1982	Sorsa III	316	People's Democratic League
Kaarina Suonio	31 Dec 1982–6 May 1983; 6 May 1983 – 31 May 1986	Sorsa III; Sorsa IV	1248	Social Democratic Party
Pirjo Ala-Kapee	1 Jun 1986–30 Apr 1987	Sorsa IV	334	Social Democratic Party
Christoffer Taxell	30 Apr 1987–13 Jun 1990	Holkeri	1141	Swedish People's Party
Ole Norrback	13 Jun 1990–26 Apr 1991	Holkeri	318	Swedish People's Party
Riitta Uosukainen	26 Apr 1991–11 February 1994	Aho	1023	National Coalition Party
Olli-Pekka Heinonen	11 February 1994–13 Apr 1995; 13 Apr 1995–15 Apr 1999	Aho; Lipponen I	1890	National Coalition Party
Maija Rask	15 Apr 1999–17 Apr 2003	Lipponen II	1464	Social Democratic Party
Tuula Haatainen	17 Apr 2003–24 Jun 2003; 24 Jun 2003–23 Sep 2005	Jäätteenmäki; Vanhanen I	891	Social Democratic Party
Antti Kalliomäki	23 Sep 2005–19 Apr 2007	Vanhanen I	574	Social Democratic Party
Sari Sarkomaa	19 Apr 2007–19 Dec 2008	Vanhanen II	611	National Coalition Party
Henna Virkkunen	19 Dec 2008–1 May 2010; 1 May 2010–22 Jun 2010; 22 Jun 2010–22 Jun 2011	Vanhanen II; Vanhanen II; Kiviniemi	916	National Coalition Party
Jukka Gustafsson	22 Jun 2011–24 May 2013	Katainen	703	Social Democratic Party
Krista Kiuru	24 May 2013–4 Apr 2014	Katainen	316	Social Democratic Party
Sanni Grahn-Laasonen	5 May 2017-Incumbent	Sipilä		National Coalition Party

=== Minister of Education and Culture ===
Minister	In Office	Cabinet (Cabinets)	Number of Ministerial days (Total)	Party
Sanni Grahn-Laasonen	29 May 2015 – 5 May 2017	Sipilä	3717	National Coalition Party

=== Minister of Education and Communications ===
Minister	In Office	Cabinet (Cabinets)	Number of Ministerial days (Total)	Party
Krista Kiuru	4 Apr 2014–24 Jun 2014; 24 Jun 2014–29 May 2015	Katainen; Stubb	1438	Social Democratic Party

=== Minister of Family Affairs and Social Services ===
Minister	In Office	Cabinet (Cabinets)	Number of Ministerial days (Total)	Party
Juha Rehula	29 May 2015–Incumbent	Sipilä	774	Centre Party
Annika Saarikko	10 July 2017–Incumbent	Sipilä	2944	Centre Party

=== Minister of Social Services ===
Minister	In Office	Cabinet (Cabinets)	Number of Ministerial days (Total)	Party
Eva Biaudet	15 Apr 1999–14 Apr 2000; 19 Apr 2002–17 Apr 2003	Lipponen II; Lipponen II	730	Swedish People's Party
Osmo Soininvaara	14 Apr 2000–19 Apr 2002	Lipponen II	736	Green League
Liisa Hyssälä	17 Apr 2003–24 Jun 2003; 24 Jun 2003–19 Apr 2007	Jäätteenmäki; Vanhanen I	1464	Centre Party
Paula Risikko	19 Apr 2007–22 Jun 2010; 22 Jun 2010–22 Jun 2011	Vanhanen II; Kiviniemi	1526	National Coalition Party
Maria Guzenina-Richardson	22 Jun 2011–24 May 2013	Katainen	703	Social Democratic Party
Susanna Huovinen	24 May 2013–24 Jun 2014; 24 Jun 2014–29 May 2015	Katainen; Stubb	1310	Social Democratic Party

=== Minister of Defence ===
Minister	In Office	Cabinet (Cabinets)	Number of Ministerial days (Total)	Party
Bruno Jalander	2 Jun 1922–14 Nov 1922; 14 Nov 1922–22 Jun 1923	Cajander I Kallio I	386	Non-Partisan/Independent
Kyösti Kallio	22 Jun 1923–16 Aug 1923	Kallio I	56	Agrarian League
Vilho Nenonen	16 Aug 1923–18 Jan 1924	Kallio I	156	Non-Partisan/Independent
Viktor Schvindt	18 Jan 1924–11 Mar 1924	Cajander II	54	Non-Partisan/Independent
Ivar Aminoff	11 Mar 1924–31 May 1924	Cajander II	82	Non-Partisan/Independent
Lauri Malmberg	31 May 1924–31 Mar 1925	Ingman II	305	Non-Partisan/Independent
Aleksander Lampén	31 Mar 1925–31 Dec 1925	Tulenheimo	276	National Coalition Party
Leonard Hjelmman	31 Dec 1925–13 Dec 1926	Kallio II	348	National Coalition Party
Jalo Lahdensuo	17 Dec 1927–22 Dec 1928; 21 Mar 1931–14 Dec 1932	Sunila I Sunila II	1007	Agrarian League
Aimo Kaarlo Cajander	22 Dec 1928–16 Aug 1929	Mantere	238	National Progressive Party
Juho Niukkanen	16 Aug 1929–4 Jul 1930; 12 Mar 1937–1 Dec 1939; 1 Dec 1939–27 Mar 1940	Kallio III; Cajander III; Ryti I	1435	Agrarian League
Albin Manner	10 Jul 1930–21 Mar 1931	Svinhufvud II	255	Agrarian League
Arvi Oksala	14 Dec 1932–7 Oct 1936; 7 Oct 1936–12 Mar 1937	Kivimäki; Kallio IV	1550	Agrarian League
Rudolf Walden	27 Mar 1940–4 Jan 1941; 4 Jan 1941–5 Mar 1943; 5 Mar 1943–8 Aug 1944; 8 Aug 1944–21 Sep 1944; 21 Sep 1944–17 Nov 1944; 17 Nov 1944–1 Dec 1944	Ryti II; Rangell; Linkomies; Hackzell; U. Castrén; Paasikivi II	1711	Non-Partisan/Independent
Väinö Valve	1 Dec 1944–17 Apr 1945	Paasikivi II	138	Non-Partisan/Independent
Mauno Pekkala	17 Apr 1945–26 Mar 1946; 26 Mar 1946–27 Mar 1946	Paasikivi III; Pekkala	345	People's Democratic League
Yrjö Kallinen	27 Mar 1946–29 Jul 1948	Pekkala	856	Social Democratic Party
Emil Skog	29 Jul 1948–17 Mar 1950; 17 Jan 1951–20 Sep 1951; 20 Sep 1951–9 Jul 1953; 5 May 1954–20 Oct 1954; 20 Oct 1954–3 Mar 1956; 3 Mar 1956–27 May 1957	Fagerholm I Kekkonen II; Kekkonen III; Törngren; Kekkonen V Fagerholm II	2621	Social Democratic Party
Kustaa Tiitu	17 Mar 1950–17 Jan 1951	Kekkonen I	307	Agrarian League
Kauno Kleemola	9 Jul 1953–17 Nov 1953	Kekkonen IV	132	Agrarian League
Päiviö Hetemäki	17 Nov 1953–5 May 1954	Tuomioja	170	National Coalition Party
Atte Pakkanen	27 May 1957–2 Sep 1957	Sukselainen I	99	Agrarian League
Pekka Malinen	2 Sep 1957–29 Nov 1957	Sukselainen I	89	People's Party
Kalle Lehmus	29 Nov 1957–26 Apr 1958	Von Fieandt	149	Swedish People's PartyNon-Partisan/Independent
Edvard Björkenheim	26 Apr 1958–29 Aug 1958; 14 Jul 1961–13 Apr 1962	Kuuskoski; Miettunen I	400	Swedish People's PartyNon-Partisan/Independent
Toivo Wiherheimo	29 Aug 1958–13 Jan 1959	Fagerholm I	138	National Coalition Party
Leo Häppölä	13 Jan 1959–14 Jul 1961	Sukselainen II	914	Agrarian League
Arvo Pentti	13 Apr 1962–18 Dec 1963; 12 Sep 1964–27 May 1966; 14 May 1970–15 Jul 1970; 29 Oct 1971–23 February 1972	Karjalainen I Virolainen I Aura I Aura II	1419	Agrarian League; Centre Party; Non-Partisan/Independent; Non-Partisan/Independent
Kaarlo Leinonen	18 Dec 1963–12 Sep 1964	Lehto	270	Non-Partisan/Independent
Sulo Suorttanen	27 May 1966–22 Mar 1968; 22 Mar 1968–14 May 1970	Paasio I Koivisto I	1449	Centre Party
Kristian Gestrin	15 Jul 1970–29 Oct 1971; 4 Sep 1972–30 Sep 1974	Karjalainen I Sorsa I	1229	Swedish People's Party
Sulo Hostila	23 February 1972–4 Sep 1972	Paasio II	195	Social Democratic Party
Carl-Olaf Homén	1 Oct 1974–13 Jun 1975	Sorsa I	256	Swedish People's Party
Erkki Huurtamo	13 Jun 1975–30 Nov 1975	Liinamaa	171	Non-Partisan/Independent
Ingvar S. Melin	30 Nov 1975–29 Sep 1976	Miettunen II	305	Swedish People's Party
Seppo Westerlund	29 Sep 1976–15 May 1977	Miettunen III	229	Liberal People's Party
Taisto Tähkämaa	15 May 1977 – 26 May 1979	Sorsa II	742	Centre Party
Lasse Äikäs	26 May 1979 – 19 February 1982	Koivisto II	1001	Centre Party
Juhani Saukkonen	19 February 1982 – 6 May 1983	Sorsa III	442	Centre Party
Veikko Pihlajamäki	6 May 1983–30 Apr 1987	Sorsa IV	1456	Centre Party
Ole Norrback	30 Apr 1987–13 Jun 1990	Holkeri	1141	Swedish People's Party
Elisabeth Rehn	13 Jun 1990–26 Apr 1991; 26 Apr 1991–1 Jan 1995	Holkeri; Aho	1664	Swedish People's Party
Jan-Erik Enestam	2 Jan 1995–13 Apr 1995; 15 Apr 1999–17 Apr 2003	Aho; Lipponen I	1566	Swedish People's Party
Anneli Taina	13 Apr 1995–15 Apr 1999	Lipponen I	1464	National Coalition Party
Matti Vanhanen	17 Apr 2003–24 Jun 2003	Jäätteenmäki	69	Centre Party
Seppo Kääriäinen	24 Jun 2003–19 Apr 2007	Vanhanen I	1396	Centre Party
Jyri Häkämies	19 Apr 2007–22 Jun 2010; 22 Jun 2010–22 Jun 2011	Vanhanen II; Kiviniemi	1526	National Coalition Party
Stefan Wallin	22 Jun 2011–5 Jul 2012	Katainen	380	Swedish People's Party
Carl Haglund	5 Jul 2012–24 Jun 2014; 24 Jun 2014–29 May 2015	Katainen; Stubb	1059	Swedish People's Party
Jussi Niinistö	29 May 2015–Incumbent	Sipilä	3717	True Finns

=== Prime minister ===
Minister	In Office	Cabinet (Cabinets)	Number of Ministerial days (Total)	Party
Lauri Ingman	27 Nov 1918–17 Apr 1919; 31 May 1924–31 Mar 1925	Ingman I Ingman II	447	National Coalition Party
Kaarlo Castrén	17 Apr 1919–15 Aug 1919	K. Castrén	121	National Progressive Party
Juho Vennola	15 Aug 1919–15 Mar 1920; 9 Apr 1921–2 Jun 1922	Vennola I Vennola II	634	National Progressive Party
Rafael Erich	15 Mar 1920–9 Apr 1921	Erich	391	National Coalition Party
Aimo Kaarlo Cajander	2 Jun 1922–14 Nov 1922; 18 Jan 1924–31 May 1924; 12 Mar 1937–1 Dec 1939	Cajander I Cajander II; Cajander III	1296	Non-Partisan/Independent; Non-Partisan/Independent; National Coalition Party
Kyösti Kallio	14 Nov 1922–18 Jan 1924; 31 Dec 1925–13 Dec 1926; 16 Aug 1929–4 Jul 1930; 7 Oct 1936–15 February 1937	Kallio I Kallio II; Kallio III; Kallio IV	1234	Agrarian League
Antti Tulenheimo	31 Mar 1925–31 Dec 1925	Tulenheimo	276	National Coalition Party
Väinö Tanner	13 Dec 1926–17 Dec 1927	Tanner	370	Social Democratic Party
Juho Sunila	17 Dec 1927–22 Dec 1928; 21 Mar 1931–14 Dec 1932	Sunila I Sunila II	1007	Agrarian League
Oskari Mantere	22 Dec 1928–16 Aug 1929	Mantere	238	National Progressive Party
Pehr Evind Svinhufvud	4 Jul 1930–18 February 1931	Svinhufvud II	230	National Coalition Party
Toivo Kivimäki	14 Dec 1932–7 Oct 1936	Kivimäki	1394	National Progressive Party
Risto Ryti	1 Dec 1939–27 Mar 1940; 27 Mar 1940–19 Dec 1940	Ryti I Ryti II	385	National Progressive Party
Johan Wilhelm Rangell	4 Jan 1941–5 Mar 1943	Rangell	791	National Progressive Party
Edwin Linkomies	5 Mar 1943–8 Aug 1944	Linkomies	523	National Coalition Party
Antti Hackzell	8 Aug 1944–21 Sep 1944	Hackzell	45	Non-Partisan/Independent
Urho Castrén	21 Sep 1944–17 Nov 1944	U. Castrén	58	National Coalition Party
Juho Kusti Paasikivi	17 Nov 1944–17 Apr 1945; 17 Apr 1945–9 Mar 1946	Paasikivi II; Paasikivi III	478	Non-Partisan/Independent
Mauno Pekkala	26 Mar 1946–29 Jul 1948	Pekkala	857	People's Democratic League
Karl-August Fagerholm	29 Jul 1948–17 Mar 1950; 3 Mar 1956–27 May 1957; 29 Aug 1958–13 Jan 1959	Fagerholm I Fagerholm II; Fagerholm III	1186	Social Democratic Party
Urho Kekkonen	17 Mar 1950–17 Jan 1951; 17 Jan 1951–20 Sep 1951; 20 Sep 1951–9 Jul 1953; 9 Jul 1953–17 Nov 1953; 20 Oct 1954–15 February 1956	Kekkonen I Kekkonen II; Kekkonen III; Kekkonen IV; Kekkonen V	1826	Agrarian League
Sakari Tuomioja	17 Nov 1953–5 May 1954	Tuomioja	170	Vapaamielisten liitto
Ralf Törngren	5 May 1954–20 Oct 1954	Törngren	169	Swedish People's Party
Vieno Johannes Sukselainen	27 May 1957–29 Nov 1957; 13 Jan 1959–3 Jul 1961	Sukselainen I Sukselainen II	1090	Agrarian League
Rainer von Fieandt	29 Nov 1957–26 Apr 1958	Von Fieandt	149	Non-Partisan/Independent
Reino Kuuskoski	26 Apr 1958–29 Aug 1958	Kuuskoski	126	Non-Partisan/Independent
Martti Miettunen	14 Jul 1961–13 Apr 1962; 30 Nov 1975–29 Sep 1976; 29 Sep 1976–15 May 1977	Miettunen I Miettunen II; Miettunen III	807	Agrarian League/Centre Party
Ahti Karjalainen	13 Apr 1962–18 Dec 1963; 15 Jul 1970–29 Oct 1971	Karjalainen I Karjalainen I	1087	Agrarian League/Centre Party
Reino Lento	18 Dec 1963–12 Sep 1964	Lehto	270	Non-Partisan/Independent
Johannes Virolainen	12 Sep 1964–27 May 1966	Virolainen	623	Centre Party
Rafael Paasio	27 May 1966–22 Mar 1968; 23 February 1972–4 Sep 1972	Paasio I Paasio II	861	Social Democratic Party
Mauno Koivisto	22 Mar 1968–14 May 1970; 26 May 1979–26 Jan 1982	Koivisto I Koivisto II	1761	Social Democratic Party
Teuvo Aura	14 May 1970–15 Jul 1970; 29 Oct 1971–23 February 1972	Aura I Aura II	181	Non-Partisan/Independent
Kalevi Sorsa	4 Sep 1972–13 Jun 1975; 15 May 1977 – 26 May 1979; 19 February 1982 – 6 May 1983; 6 May 1983–30 Apr 1987	Sorsa I Sorsa II; Sorsa III; Sorsa IV	3652	Social Democratic Party
Keijo Liinamaa	13 Jun 1975–30 Nov 1975	Liinamaa	171	Non-Partisan/Independent
Harri Holkeri	30 Apr 1987–26 Apr 1991	Holkeri	1458	National Coalition Party
Esko Aho	26 Apr 1991–13 Apr 1995	Aho	1449	Centre Party
Paavo Lipponen	13 Apr 1995–15 Apr 1999; 15 Apr 1999–17 Apr 2003	Lipponen I Lipponen II	2927	Social Democratic Party
Anneli Jäätteenmäki	17 Apr 2003–24 Jun 2003	Jäätteenmäki	69	Centre Party
Matti Vanhanen	24 Jun 2003–19 Apr 2007; 19 Apr 2007–22 Jun 2010	Vanhanen I Vanhanen II	2556	Centre Party
Mari Kiviniemi	22 Jun 2010–22 Jun 2011	Kiviniemi	366	Centre Party
Jyrki Katainen	22 Jun 2011–24 Jun 2014	Katainen	1099	National Coalition Party
Alexander Stubb	24 Jun 2014–29 May 2015	Stubb	340	National Coalition Party
Juha Sipilä	29 May 2015–Incumbent	Sipilä	3717	Centre Party

=== Minister without Portfolio ===
Minister	In Office	Cabinet (Cabinets)	Number of Ministerial days (Total)	Party
Mikko Luopajärvi	17 Apr 1919–15 Aug 1919; 15 Aug 1919–5 Jan 1920	K. Castrén; Vennola I	264	Agrarian League
Kalle Lohi	31 Mar 1925–31 Dec 1925	Tulenheimo	276	Agrarian League
Matti Paasivuori	13 Dec 1926–15 Nov 1927	Tanner	338	Social Democratic Party
Kalle Jutila	17 Dec 1927–16 Oct 1928	Sunila I	305	Agrarian League
Juhani Leppälä	16 Aug 1929–27 Aug 1929	Kallio III	12	Agrarian League
Eljas Erkko	20 Oct 1932–25 Nov 1932	Sunila II	37	National Progressive Party
Ernst von Born	13 Oct 1939–1 Dec 1939	Cajander III	50	Swedish People's Party
Juho Kusti Paasikivi	1 Dec 1939–27 Mar 1940	Ryti I	118	Non-Partisan/Independent
Mauno Pekkala	17 Nov 1944–24 Nov 1944	Paasikivi II	8	Social Democratic Party
Hertta Kuusinen	26 May 1948–4 Jun 1948	Pekkala	10	People's Democratic League
Aleksi Aaltonen	29 Jul 1948–30 Jul 1948	Fagerholm I	2	Social Democratic Party
Unto Varjonen	29 Jul 1949–19 Aug 1949	Fagerholm I	22	Social Democratic Party

=== Master of Without Portfolio ===
Minister	In Office	Cabinet (Cabinets)	Number of Ministerial days (Total)	Party
Samuli Sario	27 May 1918–29 Jun 1918	Paasikivi I	34	Finnish Party

=== Chairman of the Senate ===
Minister	In Office	Cabinet (Cabinets)	Number of Ministerial days (Total)	Party
Pehr Evind Svinhufvud	27 Nov 1917–27 May 1918	Svinhufvud I	182	Young Finnish Party

=== Deputy Chairman of the Senate ===
Minister	In Office	Cabinet (Cabinets)	Number of Ministerial days (Total)	Party
Juho Kusti Paasikivi	27 May 1918–27 Nov 1918	Paasikivi I	185	Finnish Party

=== Minister of Interior Affairs ===
Minister	In Office	Cabinet (Cabinets)	Number of Ministerial days (Total)	Party
Antti Tulenheimo	27 Nov 1918–17 Apr 1919	Ingman I	142	National Coalition Party
Carl Voss-Schrader	17 Apr 1919–15 Aug 1919	K. Castrén	121	Non-Partisan/Independent
Heikki Ritavuori	15 Aug 1919–15 Mar 1920; 9 Apr 1921–14 February 1922	Vennola I Vennola II	526	National Progressive Party
Albert von Hellens	15 Mar 1920–9 Apr 1921	Erich	391	National Progressive Party
Heimo Helminen	24 February 1922–2 Jun 1922	Vennola II	99	National Progressive Party
Yrjö Johannes Eskelä	2 Jun 1922–14 Nov 1922; 18 Jan 1924–31 May 1924	Cajander I Cajander II	301	Non-Partisan/Independent
Vilkku Joukahainen	14 Nov 1922–18 Jan 1924	Kallio I	431	Agrarian League
Gunnar Sahlstein	2 Jun 1924–31 Mar 1925	Ingman II	303	National Coalition Party
Matti Aura	31 Mar 1925–31 Dec 1925; 17 Dec 1927–22 Dec 1928	Tulenheimo; Sunila I	648	Non-Partisan/Independent
Gustaf Ignatius	31 Dec 1925–13 Dec 1926	Kallio II	348	National Coalition Party
Rieti Itkonen	13 Dec 1926–12 Apr 1927	Tanner	121	Social Democratic Party
Olavi Puro	29 Apr 1927–17 Dec 1927	Tanner	233	Social Democratic Party
Toivo Kivimäki	22 Dec 1928–16 Aug 1929	Mantere	238	National Progressive Party
Arvo Linturi	16 Aug 1929–4 Jul 1930	Kallio III	323	Non-Partisan/Independent
Erkki Kuokkanen	4 Jul 1930–21 Mar 1931	Svinhufvud II	261	National Coalition Party
Ernst von Born	21 Mar 1931–14 Dec 1932; 1 Dec 1939–27 Mar 1940; 27 Mar 1940–4 Jan 1941; 4 Jan 1941–13 May 1941	Sunila II; Ryti I Ryti II; Rangell	1165	Swedish People's Party
Yrjö Puhakka	14 Dec 1932–7 Oct 1936; 7 Oct 1936–12 Mar 1937	Kivimäki; Kallio IV	1550	Non-Partisan/Independent
Urho Kekkonen	12 Mar 1937–1 Dec 1939; 17 Mar 1950–17 Jan 1951	Cajander II; Kekkonen I	1302	Agrarian League
Toivo Horelli	13 May 1941–5 Mar 1943	Rangell	662	National Coalition Party
Leo Ehrnrooth	5 Mar 1943–8 Aug 1944	Linkomies	523	Swedish People's Party
Kaarlo Hillilä	8 Aug 1944–21 Sep 1944; 21 Sep 1944–17 Nov 1944; 17 Nov 1944–17 Apr 1945	Hackzell; U. Castrén; Paasikivi II	253	Agrarian League
Yrjö Leino	17 Apr 1945–26 Mar 1946; 26 Mar 1946–22 May 1948	Paasikivi III; Pekkala	1132	People's Democratic League
Eino Kilpi	26 May 1948–29 Jul 1948	Pekkala	65	People's Democratic League
Aarre Simonen	29 Jul 1948–17 Mar 1950	Fagerholm I	597	Social Democratic Party
Vieno Johannes Sukselainen	17 Jan 1951–20 Sep 1951; 20 Sep 1951–9 Jul 1953; 9 Jul 1953–17 Nov 1953	Kekkonen II; Kekkonen III; Kekkonen IV	1036	Agrarian League
Heikki Kannisto	17 Nov 1953–5 May 1954	Tuomioja	170	People's Party
Väinö Leskinen	5 May 1954–20 Oct 1954; 20 Oct 1954–30 Sep 1955	Törngren; Kekkonen V	514	Social Democratic Party
Valto Käkelä	30 Sep 1955–3 Mar 1956	Kekkonen V	156	Social Democratic Party
Vilho Väyrynen	3 Mar 1956–27 May 1957	Fagerholm II	451	Social Democratic Party
Harras Kyttä	27 May 1957–2 Sep 1957; 26 Apr 1958–29 Aug 1958	Sukselainen I Kuuskoski	225	Liberal People's Party; Non-Partisan/Independent
Teuvo Aura	2 Sep 1957–29 Nov 1957	Sukselainen I	89	Non-Partisan/Independent
Urho Kiukas	29 Nov 1957–26 Apr 1958	Von Fieandt	149	Non-Partisan/Independent
Atte Pakkanen	29 Aug 1958–13 Jan 1959	Fagerholm III	138	Agrarian League
Eino Palovesi	13 Jan 1959–4 February 1960	Sukselainen II	388	Agrarian League
Eemil Luukka	4 February 1960–14 Jul 1961; 14 Jul 1961–13 Apr 1962	Sukselainen II; Miettunen I	800	Agrarian League
Eeli Erkkilä	13 Apr 1962–8 February 1963	Karjalainen I	302	Agrarian League
Niilo Ryhtä	8 February 1963–18 Dec 1963; 12 Sep 1964–27 May 1966	Karjalainen I Virolainen	937	Agrarian League/Centre Party
Arno Hannus	18 Dec 1963–12 Sep 1964	Lehto	270	Non-Partisan/Independent
Martti Viitanen	27 May 1966–30 Nov 1967; 23 February 1972–4 Sep 1972	Paasio I Paasio II	748	Social Democratic Party
Antero Väyrynen	1 Dec 1967–22 Mar 1968; 22 Mar 1968–14 May 1970	Paasio I Koivisto I	896	Social Democratic Party
Teemu Hiltunen	14 May 1970–15 Jul 1970	Aura I	63	Non-Partisan/Independent
Artturi Jämsén	15 Jul 1970–28 May 1971	Karjalainen I	318	Centre Party
Eino Uusitalo	28 May 1971–29 Oct 1971; 29 Sep 1976–15 May 1977; 15 May 1977 – 26 May 1979; 26 May 1979 – 19 February 1982	Karjalainen I Miettunen III; Sorsa II; Koivisto II	2125	Centre Party
Heikki Tuominen	29 Oct 1971–23 February 1972; 4 Sep 1972–13 Jun 1975	Aura II; Sorsa I	1131	Non-Partisan/Independent
Heikki Tuominen	13 Jun 1975–30 Nov 1975	Liinamaa	171	Non-Partisan/Independent
Paavo Tiilikainen	30 Nov 1975–29 Sep 1976	Miettunen II	305	Social Democratic Party
Matti Ahde	19 February 1982 – 6 May 1983; 6 May 1983–30 Sep 1983	Sorsa III; Sorsa IV	589	Social Democratic Party
Matti Luttinen	1 Oct 1983–30 Nov 1984	Sorsa IV	427	Social Democratic Party
Kaisa Raatikainen	1 Dec 1984–30 Apr 1987	Sorsa IV	881	Social Democratic Party
Jarmo Rantanen	30 Apr 1987–26 Apr 1991	Holkeri	1458	Social Democratic Party
Mauri Pekkarinen	26 Apr 1991–13 Apr 1995	Aho	1449	Centre Party
Jan-Erik Enestam	13 Apr 1995–15 Apr 1999	Lipponen I	1464	Swedish People's Party
Kari Häkämies	15 Apr 1999–1 Sep 2000	Lipponen II	506	National Coalition Party
Ville Itälä	1 Sep 2000–17 Apr 2003	Lipponen II	959	National Coalition Party
Kari Rajamäki	17 Apr 2003–24 Jun 2003; 24 Jun 2003–19 Apr 2007	Jäätteenmäki	1464	Social Democratic Party
Anne Holmlund	19 Apr 2007–22 Jun 2010; 22 Jun 2010–22 Jun 2011	Vanhanen II; Kiviniemi	1526	National Coalition Party
Päivi Räsänen	22 Jun 2011–1 Jan 2014	Katainen	925	Christian Democrats

=== Master of Internal affairs ===
Minister	In Office	Cabinet (Cabinets)	Number of Ministerial days (Total)	Party
Arthur Castrén	27 Nov 1917–27 May 1918; 27 May 1918–27 Nov 1918	Svinhufvud I Paasikivi I	366	Young Finnish Party

=== Minister of Social Affairs and Health ===
Minister	In Office	Cabinet (Cabinets)	Number of Ministerial days (Total)	Party
Gunnar Korhonen	14 May 1970–15 Jul 1970m	Aura I	63	Non-Partisan/Independent
Anna-Liisa Tiekso	15 Jul 1970–26 Mar 1971	Karjalainen I	255	People's Democratic League
Pekka Kuusi	26 Mar 1971–29 Oct 1971	Karjalainen I	218	Social Democratic Party
Alli Lahtinen	29 Oct 1971–23 February 1972; 13 Jun 1975–30 Nov 1975	Aura II; Liinamaa	289	Non-Partisan/Independent
Osmo Kaipainen	23 February 1972–4 Sep 1972	Paasio II	195	Social Democratic Party
Seija Karkinen	4 Sep 1972–13 Jun 1975	Sorsa I	1013	Social Democratic Party
Irma Toivanen	30 Nov 1975–29 Sep 1976; 29 Sep 1976–15 May 1977	Miettunen I Miettunen II	533	Liberal People's Party
Pirkko Työläjärvi	15 May 1977 – 26 May 1979	Sorsa II	742	Social Democratic Party
Sinikka Luja-Penttilä	26 May 1979 – 19 February 1982	Koivisto II	1001	Social Democratic Party
Jacob Söderman	19 February 1982–30 Jun 1982	Sorsa III	132	Social Democratic Party
Vappu Taipale	1 Jul 1982–6 May 1983	Sorsa III	310	Social Democratic Party
Eeva Kuuskoski	6 May 1983–30 Apr 1987; 26 Apr 1991–24 Apr 1992	Sorsa IV; Aho	1821	Centre Party
Helena Pesola	30 Apr 1987–31 Dec 1989	Holkeri	977	National Coalition Party
Mauri Miettinen	1 Jan 1990–26 Apr 1991	Holkeri	481	National Coalition Party
Jorma Huuhtanen	24 Apr 1992–13 Apr 1995	Aho	1085	Centre Party
Sinikka Mönkäre	13 Apr 1995–15 Apr 1999; 17 Apr 2003–24 Jun 2003; 24 Jun 2003–23 Sep 2005	Lipponen I Jäätteenmäki; Vanhanen I	2355	Social Democratic Party
Maija Perho	15 Apr 1999–17 Apr 2003	Lipponen II	1464	National Coalition Party
Tuula Haatainen	23 Sep 2005–19 Apr 2007	Vanhanen I	574	Social Democratic Party
Liisa Hyssälä	19 Apr 2007–24 May 2010	Vanhanen II	1132	Centre Party
Juha Rehula	24 May 2010–22 Jun 2010; 22 Jun 2010–22 Jun 2011	Vanhanen II; Kiviniemi	395	Centre Party
Paula Risikko	22 Jun 2011–24 Jun 2014	Katainen	1099	National Coalition Party
Laura Räty	24 Jun 2014–29 May 2015	Stubb	340	National Coalition Party
Hanna Mäntylä	29 May 2015–25 Aug 2016	Sipilä	455	True Finns
Pirkko Mattila	25.8.2016 – Incumbent	Sipilä	3263	True Finns

=== Minister of Interior ===
Minister	In Office	Cabinet (Cabinets)	Number of Ministerial days (Total)	Party
Päivi Räsänen	1 Jan 2014–24 Jun 2014; 24 Jun 2014; 26 Sep 2014	Katainen; Stubb; Stubb	1438	Christian Democrats
Petteri Orpo	29 May 2015–22 Jun 2016	Sipilä	391	National Coalition Party
Paula Risikko	22 Jun 2016 – Incumbent	Sipilä	3327	National Coalition Party

=== Minister of Social Affairs ===
Minister	In Office	Cabinet (Cabinets)	Number of Ministerial days (Total)	Party
Eero Erkko	27 Nov 1918–17 Apr 1919	Ingman I	142	National Progressive Party
Santeri Alkio	17 Apr 1919–15 Aug 1919; 15 Aug 1919–15 Mar 1920	K. Castrén	334	Agrarian League
Vilkku Joukahainen	15 Mar 1920–9 Apr 1921; 9 Apr 1921–2 Jun 1922; 31 Mar 1925–31 Dec 1925	Erich; Vennola II; Tulenheimo	1086	Agrarian League
Eino Kuusi	2 Jun 1922–14 Nov 1922	Cajander I	166	Non-Partisan/Independent
Oskari Mantere	14 Nov 1922–18 Jan 1924	Kallio I	431	National Progressive Party
Emil Böök	18 Jan 1924–31 May 1924	Cajander II	135	Non-Partisan/Independent
Niilo Liakka	31 May 1924–22 Nov 1924	Ingman II	176	Agrarian League
Lauri Pohjala	22 Nov 1924–31 Mar 1925	Ingman II	130	National Coalition Party
Kalle Lohi	31 Dec 1925–13 Dec 1926; 17 Dec 1927–22 Dec 1928; 20 Oct 1932–14 Dec 1932	Kallio I Sunila I Sunila II	776	Agrarian League
Johan Helo	13 Dec 1926–15 Nov 1927	Tanner	338	Social Democratic Party
Matti Paasivuori	15 Nov 1927–17 Dec 1927	Tanner	33	Social Democratic Party
Niilo Mannio	22 Dec 1928–16 Aug 1929	Mantere	238	National Progressive Party
Herman Paavilainen	27 Aug 1929–4 Jul 1930	Kallio III	312	Non-Partisan/Independent
Eino Tuomivaara	4 Jul 1930–21 Mar 1931	Svinhufvud II	261	Agrarian League
Edvard Kilpeläinen	21 Mar 1931–3 Mar 1932	Sunila II	349	National Coalition Party
Erkki Paavolainen	3 Mar 1932–20 Oct 1932	Sunila II	232	National Coalition Party
Eemil Hynninen	14 Dec 1932–31 Dec 1935	Kivimäki	1113	Agrarian League
Bruno Sarlin	31 Dec 1935–7 Oct 1936	Kivimäki	282	National Progressive Party
Toivo Janhonen	7 Oct 1936–12 Mar 1937	Kallio IV	157	Agrarian League
Jaakko Keto	12 Mar 1937–9 Nov 1937	Cajander III	243	Social Democratic Party
Karl-August Fagerholm	9 Nov 1937–1 Dec 1939; 1 Dec 1939–27 Mar 1940; 27 Mar 1940–4 Jan 1941; 4 Jan 1941–5 Mar 1943; 5 Mar 1943–17 Dec 1943; 21 Sep 1944–17 Nov 1944	Cajander III; Ryti I Ryti II; Rangell; Linkomies; U. Castrén	2288	Social Democratic Party
Aleksi Aaltonen	17 Dec 1943–8 Aug 1944; 8 Aug 1944–21 Sep 1944; 18 Mar 1949–17 Mar 1950	Linkomies; Hackzell; Fagerholm I	645	Social Democratic Party
Ralf Törngren	17 Nov 1944–17 Apr 1945; 17 Mar 1950–17 Jan 1951; 20 Sep 1951–26 Nov 1952	Paasikivi I Kekkonen I Kekkonen III	893	Swedish People's Party
Eino Kilpi	17 Apr 1945–26 Mar 1946	Paasikivi III	344	Social Democratic Party
Matti Janhunen	26 Mar 1946–29 Jul 1948	Pekkala	857	People's Democratic League
Valdemar Liljeström	29 Jul 1948–4 Mar 1949; 26 Apr 1958–29 Aug 1958	Fagerholm I Kuuskoski	345	Social Democratic Party; Non-Partisan/Independent
Tyyne Leivo-Larsson	4 Mar 1949–18 Mar 1949; 5 May 1954–20 Oct 1954; 17 May 1957 – 27 May 1957	Fagerholm I Törngren; Fagerholm II	195	Social Democratic Party
Vihtori Vesterinen	17 Jan 1951–20 Sep 1951	Kekkonen II	247	Agrarian League
Väinö Leskinen	26 Nov 1952–9 Jul 1953; 29 Aug 1958–13 Jan 1959	Kekkonen III; Fagerholm III	364	Social Democratic Party
Lauri Hietanen	9 Jul 1953–17 Nov 1953	Kekkonen IV	132	Non-Partisan/Independent
Esa Kaitila	17 Nov 1953–5 May 1954	Tuomioja	170	People's Party
Onni Peltonen	20 Oct 1954–3 Mar 1956	Kekkonen V	501	Social Democratic Party
Eino Saari	3 Mar 1956–17 May 1957	Fagerholm II	441	People's Party
Irma Karvikko	27 May 1957–2 Sep 1957	Sukselainen I	99	People's Party
Aino Malkamäki	2 Sep 1957–29 Nov 1957	Sukselainen I	89	Social Democratic Union of Workers and Smallholders
Heikki Waris	29 Nov 1957–26 Apr 1958	Von Fieandt	149	Non-Partisan/Independent
Vieno Simonen	13 Jan 1959–14 Jul 1961; 14 Jul 1961–13 Apr 1962	Sukselainen II	1187	Agrarian League
Olavi Saarinen	13 Apr 1962–18 Oct 1963	Karjalainen I	554	Social Democratic Union of Workers and Smallholders
Kyllikki Pohjala	18 Oct 1963–18 Dec 1963	Karjalainen I	62	National Coalition Party
Olof Ojala	18 Dec 1963–12 Sep 1964	Lehto	270	Non-Partisan/Independent
Juho Tenhiälä	12 Sep 1964–27 May 1966	Virolainen	623	People's Party
Matti Koivunen	27 May 1966–22 Mar 1968	Paasio I	666	People's Democratic League
Anna-Liisa Tiekso	22 Mar 1968–14 May 1970	Koivisto I	784	People's Democratic League

=== Master of Social affairs ===
Minister	In Office	Cabinet (Cabinets)	Number of Ministerial days (Total)	Party
Oskari Wilho Louhivuori	27 Nov 1917–27 May 1918; 27 May 1918–29 Jun 1918	Svinhufvud I Paasikivi I	215	Finnish Party

=== Master of War Affairs ===
Minister	In Office	Cabinet (Cabinets)	Number of Ministerial days (Total)	Party
Wilhelm Alexander Thesleff	27 May 1918–27 Nov 1918	Paasikivi I	185	Non-Partisan/Independent

=== Minister of War ===
Minister	In Office	Cabinet (Cabinets)	Number of Ministerial days (Total)	Party
Rudolf Walden	27 Nov 1918–17 Apr 1919; 17 Apr 1919–15 Aug 1919	Ingmanin I K.Castrén	262	Non-Partisan/Independent
Karl Berg	15 Aug 1919–15 Mar 1920	Vennola I	214	Non-Partisan/Independent
Bruno Jalander	15 Mar 1920–9 Apr 1921; 3 Sep 1921–2 Jun 1922	Erich; Vennola II	664	Non-Partisan/Independent
Onni Hämäläinen	9 Apr 1921–3 Sep 1921	Vennola II	148	Non-Partisan/Independent

=== Coordinate Minister of Finance ===
Minister	In Office	Cabinet (Cabinets)	Number of Ministerial days (Total)	Party
Suvi-Anne Siimes	15 Apr 1999–17 Apr 2003	Lipponen II	1464	Left Alliance
Ulla-Maj Wideroos	17 Apr 2003–24 Jun 2003; 24 Jun 2003–19 Apr 2007	Jäätteenmäki; Vanhanen I	1464	Swedish People's Party

=== Minister of Employment ===
Minister	In Office	Cabinet (Cabinets)	Number of Ministerial days (Total)	Party
Matti Puhakka	1 Jun 1989–26 Apr 1991	Holkeri	695	Social Democratic Party
Ilkka Kanerva	26 Apr 1991–13 Apr 1995	Aho	1449	National Coalition Party
Liisa Jaakonsaari	13 Apr 1995–15 Apr 1999	Lipponen I	1464	Social Democratic Party
Sinikka Mönkäre	15 Apr 1999–25 February 2000	Lipponen I	317	Social Democratic Party
Tarja Filatov	25 February 2000–17 Apr 2003; 17 Apr 2003–24 Jun 2003	Lipponen II; Jäätteenmäki; Vanhanen I	2611	Social Democratic Party
Tarja Cronberg	19 Apr 2007–1 Jan 2008; 1 Jan 2008–26 Jun 2009	Vanhanen II; Vanhanen II	800	Green League
Anni Sinnemäki	26 Jun 2009–22 Jun 2010; 22 Jun 2010–22 Jun 2011	Vanhanen II; Kiviniemi	727	Green League
Lauri Ihalainen	22 Jun 2011–24 Jun 2014; 24 Jun 2014–29 May 2015	Katainen; Stubb	1438	Social Democratic Party

=== Minister of Labour ===
Minister	In Office	Cabinet (Cabinets)	Number of Ministerial days (Total)	Party
Veikko Helle	1 Mar 1970–14 May 1970; 15 Jul 1970–29 Oct 1971; 23 February 1972–4 Sep 1972; 31 Dec 1982–6 May 1983	Koivisto I Karjalainen I Paasio I Sorsa III	869	Social Democratic Party
Esa Timonen	14 May 1970–15 Jul 1970	Aura I	63	Non-Partisan/Independent
Keijo Liinamaa	29 Oct 1971–23 February 1972	Aura II	118	Non-Partisan/Independent
Valde Nevalainen	4 Sep 1972–13 Jun 1975	Sorsa I	1013	Social Democratic Party
Ilmo Paananen	13 Jun 1975–30 Nov 1975	Liinamaa	171	Non-Partisan/Independent
Paavo Aitio	30 Nov 1975–29 Sep 1976	Miettunen II	305	People's Democratic League
Paavo Väyrynen	29 Sep 1976–15 May 1977	Miettunen II	229	Centre Party
Arvo Aalto	15 May 1977 – 26 May 1979; 15 May 1977 – 26 May 1979	Koivisto II; Sorsa II	1406	People's Democratic League
Jouko Kajanoja	20 Mar 1981–19 February 1982; 19 February 1982–31 Dec 1982	Koivisto II; Sorsa II	652	People's Democratic League
Urpo Leppänen	6 May 1983–30 Apr 1987	Sorsa IV	1456	Finnish Rural Party
Matti Puhakka	30 Apr 1987–31 May 1989	Holkeri	763	Social Democratic Party

=== Minister of Foreign Affairs ===
Minister	In Office	Cabinet (Cabinets)	Number of Ministerial days (Total)	Party
Carl Enckell	27 Nov 1918–17 Apr 1919; 17 Apr 1919–28 Apr 1919; 2 Jun 1922–14 Nov 1922; 18 Jan 1924–31 May 1924; 8 Aug 1944–21 Sep 1944; 21 Sep 1944–17 Nov 1944; 17 Nov 1944–17 Apr 1945; 17 Apr 1945–26 Mar 1946; 26 Mar 1946–29 Jul 1948; 29 Jul 1948–17 Mar 1950	Ingman I K. Castrén; Cajander I Cajander II; Hackzell; U. Castrén; Paasikivi II; Paasikivi III; Pekkala; Fagerholm I	2502	Non-Partisan/Independent
Rudolf Holsti	28 Apr 1919–15 Aug 1919; 15 Aug 1919–15 Mar 1920; 15 Mar 1920–9 Apr 1921; 9 Apr 1921–20 May 1922; 7 Oct 1936–12 Mar 1937; 12 Mar 1937–16 Nov 1938	K. Castrén; Vennola I Erich; Vennola II; Kallio IV; Cajander III	1890	National Progressive Party
Juho Vennola	14 Nov 1922–18 Jan 1924	Kallio I	431	National Progressive Party
Hjalmar J. Procopé	31 May 1924–31 Mar 1925; 17 Dec 1927–22 Dec 1928; 22 Dec 1928–16 Aug 1929; 16 Aug 1929–4 Jul 1930; 4 Jul 1930–21 Mar 1931	Ingman II; Sunila I Mantere; Kallio III; Svinhufvud II	1496	Swedish People's Party; Non-Partisan/Independent; Non-Partisan/Independent; Non-Partisan/Independent; Non-Partisan/Independent
Karl Idman	31 Mar 1925–31 Dec 1925	Tulenheimo	276	Non-Partisan/Independent
Emil Nestor Setälä	31 Dec 1925–13 Dec 1926	Kallio II	348	National Coalition Party
Väinö Voionmaa	13 Dec 1926–17 Dec 1927; 16 Nov 1938–1 Dec 1938	Tanner; Cajander III	386	Social Democratic Party
Aarno Yrjö-Koskinen	21 Mar 1931–14 Dec 1932	Sunila II	635	National Coalition Party
Antti Hackzell	14 Dec 1932–7 Oct 1936	Kivimäki	1394	Non-Partisan/Independent
Eljas Erkko	12 Dec 1938–1 Dec 1939	Cajander III	355	National Progressive Party
Väinö Tanner	1 Dec 1939–27 Mar 1940	Ryti I	118	Social Democratic Party
Rolf Witting	27 Mar 1940–4 Jan 1941; 4 Jan 1941–5 Mar 1943	Ryti II; Rangell	1074	Swedish People's Party
Henrik Ramsay	5 Mar 1943–8 Aug 1944	Linkomies	523	Swedish People's Party
Åke Gartz	17 Mar 1950–17 Jan 1951; 17 Jan 1951–20 Sep 1951	Kekkonen I Kekkonen II	553	Non-Partisan/Independent
Sakari Tuomioja	20 Sep 1951–26 Nov 1952	Kekkonen III	434	Non-Partisan/Independent
Urho Kekkonen	26 Nov 1952–9 Jul 1953; 5 May 1954–20 Oct 1954	Kekkonen III; Törngren	395	Agrarian League
Ralf Törngren	9 Jul 1953–17 Nov 1953; 17 Nov 1953–5 May 1954; 3 Mar 1956–27 May 1957; 13 Jan 1959–16 May 1961	Kekkonen IV; Tuomioja; Fagerholm II; Sukselainen I	1607	Swedish People's Party
Johannes Virolainen	20 Oct 1954–3 Mar 1956; 27 May 1957–29 Nov 1957	Kekkonen V Sukselainen I Fagerholm III	786	Agrarian League
Paavo Hynninen	29 Nov 1957–26 Apr 1958; 26 Apr 1958–29 Aug 1958	Von Fieandt	274	Non-Partisan/Independent
Karl-August Fagerholm	4 Dec 1958–13 Jan 1959	Fagerholm III	41	Social Democratic Party
Vieno Johannes Sukselainen	19 May 1961–19 Jun 1961	Sukselainen II	32	Agrarian League
Ahti Karjalainen	19 Jun 1961–14 Jul 1961; 14 Jul 1961–13 Apr 1962; 12 Sep 1964–27 May 1966; 27 May 1966–22 Mar 1968; 22 Mar 1968–14 May 197; 04 Sep 1972–13 Jun 1975	Sukselainen II; Miettunen I Virolainen; Paasio I Koivisto I Sorsa II	3383	Agrarian League/Centre Party
Veli Merikoski	13 Apr 1962–18 Dec 1963	Karjalainen I	615	People's Party
Jaakko Hallama	18 Dec 1963–12 Sep 1964	Lehto	270	Non-Partisan/Independent
Väinö Leskinen	14 May 1970–15 Jul 1970	Aura I	534	Non-Partisan/Independent
Olavi J. Mattila	29 Oct 1971–23 February 1972; 13 Jun 1975–30 Nov 1975	Aura II; Liinamaa	289	Non-Partisan/Independent
Kalevi Sorsa	23 February 1972–4 Sep 1972; 30 Nov 1975–29 Sep 1976; 30 Apr 1987–31 Jan 1989	Paasio II; Miettunen II; Holkeri	1143	Social Democratic Party
Keijo Korhonen	29 Sep 1976–15 May 1977	Miettunen III	229	Centre Party
Paavo Väyrynen	15 May 1977 – 26 May 1979; 26 May 1979 – 19 February 1982; 6 May 1983–30 Apr 1987; 26 Apr 1991–5 May 1993	Sorsa II; Koivisto II; Sorsa IV; Aho	3939	Centre Party
Pär Stenbäck	19 February 1982 – 6 May 1983	Sorsa III	442	Swedish People's Party
Pertti Paasio	1 February 1989–26 Apr 1991	Holkeri	815	Social Democratic Party
Heikki Haavisto	5 May 1993 – 3 February 1995	Aho	640	Centre Party
Paavo Rantanen	3 February 1995–13 Apr 1995	Aho	70	Non-Partisan/Independent
Tarja Halonen	13 Apr 1995–15 Apr 1999; 15 Apr 1999–25 February 2000	Lipponen I Lipponen II	1780	Social Democratic Party
Erkki Tuomioja	25 February 2000–17 Apr 2003; 17 Apr 2003–24 Jun 2003; 24 Jun 2003–19 Apr 2007; 22 Jun 2011–24 Jun 2014; 24 Jun 2014–29 May 2015	Lipponen II; Jäätteenmäki; Vanhanen I Katainen; Stubb	4365	Social Democratic Party
Ilkka Kanerva	19 Apr 2007–4 Apr 2008	Vanhanen II	352	National Coalition Party
Alexander Stubb	4 Apr 2008–22 Jun 2010; 22 Jun 2010–22 Jun 2011	Vanhanen II; Kiviniemi	1175	National Coalition Party
Timo Soini	29 May 2015–Incumbent	Sipilä	3717	True Finns

=== Master of Foreign Affairs ===
Minister	In Office	Cabinet (Cabinets)	Number of Ministerial days (Total)	Party
Otto Stenroth	27 May 1918–27 Nov 1918	Paasikivi I	185	Young Finnish Party

=== Minister for Foreign Trade and Development ===
Minister	In Office	Cabinet (Cabinets)	Number of Ministerial days (Total)	Party
Paula Lehtomäki	17 Apr 2003–24 Jun 2003; 24 Jun 2003–2 Sep 2005; 3 Mar 2006–19 Apr 2007	Jäätteenmäki; Vanhanen I Vanhanen II	1283	Centre Party
Mari Kiviniemi	2 Sep 2005–3 Mar 2006	Vanhanen I	183	Centre Party
Paavo Väyrynen	19 Apr 2007–22 Jun 2010; 22 Jun 2010–22 Jun 2011	Vanhanen II; Kiviniemi	1526	Centre Party
Lenita Toivakka	29 May 2015–Incumbent	Sipilä	3717	National Coalition Party

=== Minister of Foreign Trade ===
Minister	In Office	Cabinet (Cabinets)	Number of Ministerial days (Total)	Party
Kimmo Sasi	15 Apr 1999–4 Jan 2002	Lipponen II	996	National Coalition Party
Jari Vilén	4 Jan 2002–17 Apr 2003	Lipponen II	469	National Coalition Party

=== Minister of Finance ===
Minister	In Office	Cabinet (Cabinets)	Number of Ministerial days (Total)	Party
Kaarlo Castrén	27 Nov 1918–17 Apr 1919	Ingman I	142	National Progressive Party
August Ramsay	17 Apr 1919–15 Aug 1919	K. Castren	121	Swedish People's Party
Johannes Lundson	15 Aug 1919–2 Mar 1920	Vennola I	201	National Progressive Party
Jonathan Vartiovaara	15 Mar 1920–9 Apr 1921	Erich	391	National Coalition Party
Risto Ryti	9 Apr 1921–2 Jun 1922; 14 Nov 1922–18 Jan 1924	Vennola II; Kallio I	851	National Progressive Party
Ernst Gråsten	2 Jun 1922–14 Nov 1922	Cajander I	166	Non-Partisan/Independent
Hugo Relander	18 Jan 1924–31 May 1924; 31 Mar 1925–31 Dec 1925; 22 Dec 1928–16 Aug 1929; 14 Dec 1932–7 Oct 1936	Cajander II; Tulenheimo; Mantere; Kivimäki	2043	Non-Partisan/Independent
Yrjö Pulkkinen	31 May 1924–31 Mar 1925	Ingman II	305	National Coalition Party
Kyösti Järvinen	31 Dec 1925–13 Dec 1926; 21 Mar 1931–14 Dec 1932	Kallio II; Sunila II	983	National Coalition Party
Hannes Ryömä	13 Dec 1926–17 Dec 1927	Tanner	370	Social Democratic Party
Juho Niukkanen	17 Dec 1927–22 Dec 1928; 7 Oct 1936–12 Mar 1937; 9 Jul 1953–17 Nov 1953	Sunila I Kallio IV; Kekkonen IV	661	Agrarian League
Tyko Reinikka	16 Aug 1929–4 Jul 1930	Kallio III	323	Agrarian League
Juho Vennola	4 Jul 1930–21 Mar 1931	Svinhufvud II	261	National Progressive Party
Väinö Tanner	12 Mar 1937–1 Dec 1939; 22 May 1942–5 Mar 1943; 5 Mar 1943–8 Aug 1944	Cajander III; Rangell; Linkomies	1805	Social Democratic Party
Mauno Pekkala	1 Dec 1939–27 Mar 1940; 27 Mar 1940–4 Jan 1941; 4 Jan 1941–22 May 1942	Ryti I Ryti II; Rangell	904	Social Democratic Party
Onni Hiltunen	8 Aug 1944–21 Sep 1944; 21 Sep 1944–17 Nov 1944; 29 Jul 1948–17 Mar 1950; 17 Jan 1951–20 Sep 1951	Hackzell; U. Castrén; Fagerholm I Kekkonen II	946	Social Democratic Party
Johan Helo	17 Nov 1944–17 Apr 1945	Paasikivi II	152	Social Democratic Party
Sakari Tuomioja	17 Apr 1945–17 Jul 1945	Paasikivi III	92	National Progressive Party
Ralf Törngren	17 Jul 1945–26 Mar 1946; 26 Mar 1946–29 Jul 1948	Paasikivi III; Pekkala	1109	Swedish People's Party
Vieno Johannes Sukselainen	17 Mar 1950–17 Jan 1951; 5 May 1954–20 Oct 1954	Kekkonen I Törngren	476	Agrarian League
Viljo Rantala	20 Sep 1951–9 Jul 1953	Kekkonen III	659	Social Democratic Party
Tuure Junnila	17 Nov 1953–5 May 1954	Tuomioja	170	National Coalition Party
Penna Tervo	20 Oct 1954–26 February 1956	Kekkonen V	495	Social Democratic Party
Aarre Simonen	3 Mar 1956–27 May 1957	Fagerholm II	451	Social Democratic Party
Nils Meinander	27 May 1957–2 Jul 1957	Sukselainen I	37	Swedish People's Party
Martti Miettunen	2 Jul 1957–29 Nov 1957	Sukselainen I	151	Agrarian League
Lauri Hietanen	29 Nov 1957–26 Apr 1958	Von Fieandt	149	Non-Partisan/Independent
Ilmo Nurmela	26 Apr 1958–29 Aug 1958	Kuuskoski	126	Non-Partisan/Independent
Päiviö Hetemäki	29 Aug 1958–13 Jan 1959; 14 May 1970–15 Jul 1970; 29 Oct 1971–23 February 1972	Fagerholm III; Aura I Aura II	319	National Coalition Party; Non-Partisan/Independent; Non-Partisan/Independent
Vihtori Sarjala	13 Jan 1959–14 Jul 1961; 14 Jul 1961–13 Apr 1962	Sukselainen II; Miettunen I	1187	Agrarian League
Osmo Karttunen	13 Apr 1962–13 Dec 1963	Karjalainen I	610	National Coalition Party
Mauno Jussila	13 Dec 1963–18 Dec 1963	Karjalainen I	6	Agrarian League
Esko Rekola	18 Dec 1963–12 Sep 1964; 29 Sep 1976–15 May 1977	Lehto; Miettunen III	499	Non-Partisan/Independent
Esa Kaitila	12 Sep 1964–27 May 1966	Virolainen	623	People's Party
Mauno Koivisto	27 May 1966–31 Dec 1967; 23 February 1972–4 Sep 1972	Paasio I Paasio II	779	Social Democratic Party
Eino Raunio	1 Jan 1968–22 Mar 1968; 22 Mar 1968–14 May 1970	Paasio I Koivisto I	865	Social Democratic Party
Carl Olof Tallgren	15 Jul 1970–29 Oct 1971	Karjalainen I	472	Swedish People's Party
Johannes Virolainen	4 Sep 1972–13 Jun 1975	Sorsa I	1013	Centre Party
Heikki Tuominen	13 Jun 1975–30 Nov 1975	Liinamaa	171	Non-Partisan/Independent
Paul Paavela	30 Nov 1975–29 Sep 1976; 15 May 1977 – 26 May 1979	Miettunen II; Sorsa II	1047	Social Democratic Party
Ahti Pekkala	26 May 1979 – 19 February 1982; 19 February 1982 – 6 May 1983; 6 May 1983–31 Jan 1986	Koivisto II; Sorsa III; Sorsa IV	2443	Centre Party
Esko Ollila	1 February 1986–30 Apr 1987	Sorsa IV	454	Centre Party
Erkki Liikanen	30 Apr 1987–28 February 1990	Holkeri	1036	Social Democratic Party
Matti Louekoski	1 Mar 1990–26 Apr 1991	Holkeri	422	Social Democratic Party
Iiro Viinanen	26 Apr 1991–13 Apr 1995; 13 Apr 1995–2 February 1996	Aho; Lipponen I	1744	National Coalition Party
Sauli Niinistö	2 February 1996–15 Apr 1999; 15 Apr 1999–17 Apr 2003	Lipponen I Lipponen II	2632	National Coalition Party
Antti Kalliomäki	17 Apr 2003–24 Jun 2003; 24 Jun 2003–23 Sep 2005	Jäätteenmäki; Vanhanen I	891	Social Democratic Party
Eero Heinäluoma	23 Sep 2005–19 Apr 2007	Vanhanen I	574	Social Democratic Party
Jyrki Katainen	19 Apr 2007–22 Jun 2010; 22 Jun 2010–22 Jun 2011	Vanhanen II; Kiviniemi	1526	National Coalition Party
Jutta Urpilainen	22 Jun 2011–6 Jun 2014	Katainen	1081	Social Democratic Party
Antti Rinne	6 Jun 2014–24 Jun 2014; 24 Jun 2014–29 May 2015	Katainen; Stubb	273	Social Democratic Party
Alexander Stubb	29 May 2015–22 Jun 2016	Sipilä	391	National Coalition Party
Petteri Orpo	22 Jun 2016 –Incumbent	Sipilä	3327	National Coalition Party

=== Master of Financial affairs ===
Minister	In Office	Cabinet (Cabinets)	Number of Ministerial days (Total)	Party
Juhani Arajärvi	27 Nov 1917–27 May 1918; 27 May 1918–27 Nov 1918	Svinhufvud I Paasikivi I	366	Finnish Party

=== Minister of Communications ===
Minister	In Office	Cabinet (Cabinets)	Number of Ministerial days (Total)	Party
Suvi Lindén	19 Apr 2007–22 Jun 2010	Vanhanen II	1526	National Coalition Party

=== Minister of Environment ===
Minister	In Office	Cabinet (Cabinets)	Number of Ministerial days (Total)	Party
Matti Ahde	1 Oct 1983–30 Apr 1987	Sorsa I	1308	Social Democratic Party
Kaj Bärlund	30 Apr 1987–26 Apr 1991	Holkeri	1458	Social Democratic Party
Sirpa Pietikäinen	26 Apr 1991–13 Apr 1995	Aho	1449	National Coalition Party
Pekka Haavisto	13 Apr 1995–15 Apr 1999	Lipponen I	1464	Green League
Satu Hassi	15 Apr 1999–31 May 2002	Lipponen II	1143	Green League
Jouni Backman	31 May 2002–17 Apr 2003	Lipponen II	322	Social Democratic Party
Jan-Erik Enestam	17 Apr 2003–24 Jun 2003; 24 Jun 2003–31 Dec 2006	Jäätteenmäki; Vanhanen I	1355	Swedish People's Party
Stefan Wallin	1 Jan 2007–19 Apr 2007	Vanhanen I	109	Swedish People's Party
Paula Lehtomäki	19 Apr 2007–28 Sep 2007; 11 Apr 2008–22 Jun 2010; 22 Jun 2010–22 Jun 2011	Vanhanen II; Vanhanen II; Kiviniemi	1331	Centre Party
Kimmo Tiilikainen	28 Sep 2007–11 Apr 2008	Vanhanen II	197	Centre Party
Ville Niinistö	22 Jun 2011–24 Jun 2014; 24 Jun 2014–26 Sep 2014	Katainen; Stubb	1193	Green League
Sanni Grahn-Laasonen	26 Sep 2014–29 May 2015	Stubb	246	National Coalition Party
Kimmo Tiilikainen	5 May 2017- Incumbent	Sipilä		Centre Party
