= Toivo Ikonen =

Finnish politician

Pekka Toivo Ikonen (15 January 1891, in Jääski – 11 June 1976) was a Finnish farmer, bank director and politician. He served as Deputy Minister of Agriculture from 4 January 1941 to 5 March 1943, Deputy Minister of People's Service from 13 November 1942 to 5 March 1943 and Deputy Minister of Transport and Public Works from 5 March 1943 to 13 January 1944. He was a member of the Parliament of Finland, representing the Finnish Party from 1916 to 1917, the National Progressive Party from 1922 to 1924 and the Agrarian League from 1933 to 1939 and from 1942 to 1951.
