= Torsten Nordström =

Finnish engineer and politician (1897–1989)

Torsten Edvin Nordström (20 May 1897 – 1 April 1989) was a Finnish engineer and politician, born in Vaasa. He was a member of the Parliament of Finland from 1936 to 1939, from 1951 to 1962 and from 1966 to 1970, representing the Swedish People's Party of Finland. He served as Deputy Minister of Transport and Public Works from 27 May to 2 July 1957. He was a presidential elector in the 1950 and 1956 presidential elections.
