= Anna-Liisa Kasurinen =

Finnish politician (born 1940)

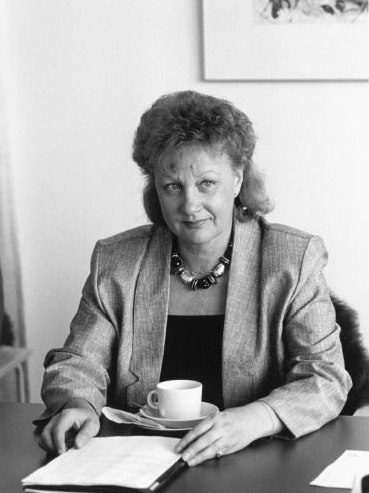
Anna-Liisa Kasurinen.

Anna-Liisa Kasurinen (née Oksanen; from 1967 to 1989 Piipari; born 8 May 1940 in Kivijärvi) is a Finnish nurse and politician. She served as Deputy Minister of Education from 30 April 1987 to 26 April 1991. She was a member of the Parliament of Finland from 1979 to 1995, representing the Social Democratic Party of Finland (SDP).
