= Reino Karpola =

Finnish farmer and politician (1930–1995)

Reino Karpola (19 February 1930 – 29 October 1995) was a Finnish farmer and politician, born in Kitee. He was a member of the Parliament of Finland from 1962 to 1979 and from 1983 to 1987, representing the Agrarian League, which changed its name to Centre Party in 1965. He served as Deputy Minister of Social affairs from 7 February to 13 June 1975 and as Minister at the Prime Minister's Office from 30 November 1975 to 29 October 1976. He was a presidential elector in the 1962, 1968, 1978 and 1982 presidential elections.
