= Sulo Hostila =

Finnish politician (1920–2002)

Sulo Armas Hostila (27 August 1920 – 2 December 2002) was a Finnish politician, born in Petrograd. He was a member of the Parliament of Finland from 1956 to 1975, representing the Social Democratic Party of Finland (SDP). He served as Minister of Defence from 23 February to 4 September 1972. He was a presidential elector in the 1962 and 1968 presidential elections.
