= Tahvo Rönkkö =

Finnish politician

Tahvo Heikki Rönkkö (8 December 1905 – 15 February 1993) was a Finnish farmer and politician, born in Sonkajärvi. He served as Minister of Agriculture from 14 July 1961 to 13 April 1962. Rönkkö was a Member of the Parliament of Finland from 1948 to 1972, representing the Agrarian League, which renamed itself the Centre Party in 1965.
