= Minister of Agriculture and Forestry (Finland) =

Finnish cabinet position

The Minister of Agriculture and Forestry (Finnish: maa- ja metsätalousministeri, Swedish: jord- och skogsbruksminister) is one of the Finnish Government's ministerial portfolios. The minister is in charge of the Ministry of Agriculture and Forestry. Since June 2023, Finland's Minister of Agriculture and Forestry has been Sari Essayah of the Christian Democrats.

== List of ministers ==
=== Key ===
Agrarian/Centre Party
Christian Democrats
National Coalition Party
National Progressive Party
Social Democratic Party
Independent

=== Ministers ===
Portrait	Name	Party	Took office	Left office	Tenure	Cabinet
	Kyösti Kallio	Agrarian	27 November 1917	17 August 1918	263 days	Svinhufvud I Paasikivi I
	Uuno Brander	Independent	17 August 1918	17 April 1919	243 days	Ingman I
	Kyösti Kallio	Agrarian	17 April 1919	15 March 1920	333 days	K. Castrén; Vennola I
	Eero Pehkonen	Agrarian	15 March 1920	9 April 1921	1 year, 25 days	Erich
	Kyösti Kallio	Agrarian	9 April 1921	2 June 1922	1 year, 54 days	Vennola II
	Östen Elfving	Independent	2 June 1922	14 November 1922	165 days	Cajander I
	Juho Sunila	Agrarian	14 November 1922	18 January 1924	1 year, 65 days	Kallio I
	Östen Elfving	Independent	18 January 1924	31 May 1924	134 days	Cajander II
	Jalo Lahdensuo	Agrarian	31 May 1924	22 November 1924	309 days	Ingman II
	Ilmari Auer	Agrarian	22 November 1924	31 March 1925	129 days	Ingman II
	Juho Sunila	Agrarian	31 March 1925	13 December 1926	1 year, 257 days	Tulenheimo; Kallio II
	Mauno Pekkala	Social Democratic	13 December 1926	17 December 1927	1 year, 4 days	Tanner
	Sigurd Mattsson	Agrarian	17 December 1927	22 December 1928	1 year, 5 days	Sunila I
	Eemil Linna	National Progressive	22 December 1928	16 August 1929	237 days	Mantere
	Kaarle Ellilä	Agrarian	16 August 1929	4 July 1930	322 days	Kallio III
	August Raatikainen	Agrarian	4 July 1930	21 March 1931	260 days	Svinhufvud II
	Sigurd Mattsson	Agrarian	21 March 1931	14 December 1932	1 year, 268 days	Sunila II
	Kalle Jutila	Agrarian	14 December 1932	25 September 1936	3 years, 286 days	Kivimäki
	Eemil Linna	National Progressive	25 September 1936	7 October 1936	12 days	Kivimäki
	Pekka Heikkinen	Agrarian	7 October 1936	15 August 1940	3 years, 313 days	Kallio IV; Cajander III; Ryti I-II
	Viljami Kalliokoski	Agrarian	15 August 1940	17 November 1944	4 years, 94 days	Ryti II; Rangell; Linkomies; Hackzell; U. Castrén
	Eemil Luukka	Agrarian	17 November 1944	17 April 1945	151 days	Paasikivi II
	Kalle Jutila	Agrarian	17 April 1945	29 September 1945	165 days	Paasikivi III
	Vihtori Vesterinen	Agrarian	9 November 1945	29 July 1948	2 years, 263 days	Paasikivi III; Pekkala
	Matti Lepistö	Social Democratic	29 July 1948	17 March 1950	1 year, 231 days	Fagerholm I
	Taavi Vilhula	Agrarian	17 March 1950	17 January 1951	306 days	Kekkonen I
	Martti Miettunen	Agrarian	17 January 1951	17 November 1953	2 years, 304 days	Kekkonen II-III-IV
	Kalle Jutila	Independent	17 November 1953	5 May 1954	169 days	Tuomioja
	Viljami Kalliokoski	Agrarian	5 May 1954	3 March 1956	1 year, 303 days	Törngren; Kekkonen V
	Martti Miettunen	Agrarian	3 March 1956	2 July 1957	1 year, 121 days	Fagerholm II; Sukselainen I
	Kusti Eskola	Agrarian	2 July 1957	29 November 1957	150 days	Fagerholm II
	Hans Perttula	Independent	29 November 1957	26 April 1958	148 days	von Fieandt
	Pauli Lehtosalo	Independent	26 April 1958	29 August 1958	125 days	Kuuskoski
	Martti Miettunen	Agrarian	29 August 1958	14 November 1958	77 days	Fagerholm III
	Urho Kähönen	Agrarian	14 November 1958	13 January 1959	60 days	Fagerholm III
	Einari Jaakkola	Agrarian	13 January 1959	14 July 1961	2 years, 182 days	Sukselainen III
	Johannes Virolainen	Agrarian	14 July 1961	18 December 1963	2 years, 157 days	Miettunen I Karjalainen I
	Samuli Suomela	Independent	18 December 1963	12 September 1964	269 days	Lehto
	Mauno Jussila	Centre	12 September 1964	27 May 1966	1 year, 257 days	Virolainen
	Nestori Kaasalainen	Centre	27 May 1966	22 March 1968	1 year, 300 days	Paasio I
	Martti Miettunen	Centre	22 March 1968	14 May 1970	2 years, 53 days	Koivisto I
	Nils Westermarck	Independent	14 May 1970	15 July 1970	62 days	Aura I
	Nestori Kaasalainen	Centre	15 July 1970	29 October 1971	1 year, 106 days	Karjalainen II
	Samuli Suomela	Independent	29 October 1971	23 February 1972	117 days	Aura II
	Leo Happonen	Social Democratic	23 February 1972	4 September 1972	194 days	Paasio II
	Erkki Haukipuro	Centre	4 September 1972	1 August 1973	331 days	Sorsa I
	Heimo Linna	Centre	1 August 1973	13 June 1975	1 year, 316 days	Sorsa I
	Veikko Ihamuotila	Independent	13 June 1975	30 November 1975	170 days	Liinamaa
	Heimo Linna	Centre	30 November 1975	29 September 1976	304 days	Miettunen II
	Johannes Virolainen	Centre	29 September 1976	26 May 1979	2 years, 239 days	Miettunen III; Sorsa II
	Taisto Tähkämaa	Centre	26 May 1979	6 May 1983	3 years, 345 days	Koivisto II; Sorsa III
	Toivo Yläjärvi	Centre	6 May 1983	30 April 1987	3 years, 359 days	Sorsa III
	Toivo T. Pohjala	National Coalition	30 April 1987	26 April 1991	3 years, 361 days	Holkeri
	Martti Pura	Centre	26 April 1991	12 April 1994	2 years, 351 days	Aho
	Mikko Pesälä	Centre	12 April 1994	13 April 1995	1 year, 1 day	Aho
	Kalevi Hemilä	Independent	13 April 1995	1 February 2002	6 years, 294 days	Lipponen I-II
	Raimo Tammilehto	Independent	1 February 2002	31 May 2002	119 days	Lipponen II
	Jari Koskinen	National Coalition	31 May 2002	17 April 2003	321 days	Lipponen II
	Juha Korkeaoja	Centre	17 April 2003	19 April 2007	4 years, 2 days	Jäätteenmäki; Vanhanen I
	Sirkka-Liisa Anttila	Centre	19 April 2007	22 June 2011	4 years, 64 days	Vanhanen II; Kiviniemi
	Jari Koskinen	National Coalition	22 June 2011	24 June 2014	3 years, 2 days	Katainen
	Petteri Orpo	National Coalition	24 June 2014	29 May 2015	339 days	Stubb
	Kimmo Tiilikainen	Centre	29 May 2015	5 May 2017	1 year, 341 days	Sipilä
	Jari Leppä	Centre	5 May 2017	29 April 2022	4 years, 359 days	Sipilä; Rinne; Marin
	Antti Kurvinen	Centre	29 April 2022	20 June 2023	1 year, 52 days	Marin
	Sari Essayah	Christian Democrats	20 June 2023	present	3 years, 57 days	Orpo

== See also ==
- Ministry of Agriculture and Forestry (Finland)
- Politics of Finland
