= Minister of Justice (Finland) =

Finnish cabinet position

The Minister of Justice (Finnish: oikeusministeri, Swedish: justitieminister) is a Finnish Government ministerial position. The Minister of Justice is in charge of the Ministry of Justice.

Finland's incumbent Minister of Justice for the Orpo Cabinet is Leena Meri of the Finns Party.

== List of ministers of justice ==
No.	Portrait	Justice Minister	Took office	Left office	Time in office	Party	Cabinet
1	Onni Talas	Onni Talas (1877–1958)	27 November 1917	27 November 1918	1 year, 0 days	Young Finnish	Svinhufvud I Paasikivi I
2	Karl Söderholm	Karl Söderholm (1859–1948)	27 November 1918	15 August 1919	261 days	RKP	Ingman I K. Castrén
3	Hjalmar Kahelin	Hjalmar Kahelin (1868–1958)	15 August 1919	30 January 1920	168 days	National Progressive	Vennola I
(2)	Karl Söderholm	Karl Söderholm (1859–1948)	15 March 1920	28 June 1920	105 days	RKP	Erich
4	Hjalmar Granfelt	Hjalmar Granfelt (1874–1957)	28 June 1920	9 April 1921	285 days	RKP	Erich
5	Heimo Helminen	Heimo Helminen (1878–1947)	9 April 1921	24 February 1922	321 days	National Progressive	Vennola II
6	Albert von Hellens	Albert von Hellens (1879–1950)	24 February 1922	2 June 1922	98 days	National Progressive	Vennola II
7	Frans Oskar Lilius	Frans Oskar Lilius (1871–1928)	2 June 1922	14 November 1922	165 days	Independent	Cajander I
8	Otto Åkesson	Otto Åkesson (1872–1939)	14 November 1922	21 December 1923	1 year, 37 days	Centre	Kallio I
9	Elias Sopanen	Elias Sopanen (1863–1926)	21 December 1923	18 January 1924	28 days	National Progressive	Kallio I
(7)	Frans Oskar Lilius	Frans Oskar Lilius (1871–1928)	18 January 1924	31 May 1924	134 days	Independent	Cajander II
(6)	Albert von Hellens	Albert von Hellens (1879–1950)	31 May 1924	31 March 1925	304 days	National Progressive	Ingman II
(7)	Frans Oskar Lilius	Frans Oskar Lilius (1871–1928)	31 March 1925	31 December 1925	275 days	Independent	Tulenheimo
10	Urho Castrén	Urho Castrén (1886–1965)	31 December 1925	13 December 1926	347 days	National Coalition	Kallio II
11	Väinö Hakkila	Väinö Hakkila (1882–1958)	13 December 1926	17 December 1927	1 year, 4 days	SDP	Tanner
12	Torsten Malinen	Torsten Malinen (1877–1951)	17 December 1927	22 December 1928	1 year, 5 days	Independent	Sunila I
13	Anton Kotonen	Anton Kotonen (1876–1936)	22 December 1928	18 February 1929	58 days	Independent	Mantere
14	Oiva Huttunen	Oiva Huttunen (1887–1945)	18 February 1929	16 August 1929	179 days	Independent	Mantere
15	Elieser Kaila	Elieser Kaila (1885–1938)	16 August 1929	4 July 1930	322 days	RKP	Kallio III
(2)	Karl Söderholm	Karl Söderholm (1859–1948)	4 July 1930	21 March 1931	260 days	RKP	Svinhufvud II
16	Toivo Kivimäki	Toivo Kivimäki (1886–1968)	21 March 1931	14 December 1932	1 year, 268 days	National Progressive	Sunila II
17	Hugo Malmberg	Hugo Malmberg (1864–1956)	14 December 1932	27 February 1933	75 days	RKP	Kivimäki
18	Eric J. Serlachius	Eric J. Serlachius (1884–1936)	27 February 1933	6 March 1936	3 years, 8 days	RKP	Kivimäki
19	Emil Jatkola	Emil Jatkola (1879–1948)	6 March 1936	7 October 1936	215 days	RKP	Kivimäki
20	Urho Kekkonen	Urho Kekkonen (1900–1986)	7 October 1936	12 March 1937	156 days	Centre	Kallio IV
21	Arvi Ahmavaara	Arvi Ahmavaara (1886–1957)	18 March 1937	11 November 1938	1 year, 238 days	Independent	Cajander III
22	Albin Ewald Rautavaara	Albin Ewald Rautavaara (1873–1941)	11 November 1938	13 October 1939	336 days	Independent	Cajander III
23	J. O. Söderhjelm	J. O. Söderhjelm (1898–1985)	13 October 1939	27 March 1940	166 days	RKP	Cajander III; Ryti I
24	Oskari Lehtonen	Oskari Lehtonen (1885–1956)	27 March 1940	8 August 1944	4 years, 134 days	National Coalition	Ryti II; Rangell; Linkomies
25	Ernst von Born	Ernst von Born (1885–1956)	8 August 1944	17 November 1944	101 days	RKP	Hackzell; U. Castrén
(20)	Urho Kekkonen	Urho Kekkonen (1900–1986)	17 November 1944	26 March 1946	1 year, 129 days	Centre	Paasikivi II-III
26	Eino Pekkala	Eino Pekkala (1887–1956)	26 March 1946	29 July 1948	2 years, 125 days	SKDL	Pekkala
27	Tauno Suontausta	Tauno Suontausta (1907–1974)	29 July 1948	17 March 1950	1 year, 231 days	SDP	Fagerholm I
28	Heikki Kannisto	Heikki Kannisto (1898–1957)	17 March 1950	17 January 1951	306 days	National Progressive	Kekkonen I
29	Teuvo Aura	Teuvo Aura (1912–1999)	17 January 1951	20 September 1951	246 days	National Progressive	Kekkonen II
(20)	Urho Kekkonen	Urho Kekkonen (1900–1986); Acting	20 September 1951	22 September 1951	2 days	Centre	Kekkonen III
30	Sven Högström	Sven Högström (1908–1995)	22 September 1951	17 November 1953	2 years, 56 days	RKP	Kekkonen III-IV
31	Reino Kuuskoski	Reino Kuuskoski (1907–1965)	17 November 1953	5 May 1954	169 days	Independent	Tuomioja
32	Yrjö Puhakka	Yrjö Puhakka (1888–1971)	5 May 1954	20 October 1954	168 days	Independent	Törngren
33	Aarre Simonen	Aarre Simonen (1913–1977)	20 October 1954	6 November 1954	17 days	SDP	Kekkonen V
34	Weio Henriksson	Weio Henriksson (1903–1973)	6 November 1954	3 March 1956	1 year, 118 days	Independent	Kekkonen V
35	Vilho Väyrynen	Vilho Väyrynen (1912–2000)	3 March 1956	2 May 1956	60 days	SDP	Fagerholm II
36	Arvo Helminen	Arvo Helminen (1903–1988)	2 May 1956	2 September 1957	1 year, 123 days	Independent	Fagerholm II; Sukselainen I
(23)	J. O. Söderhjelm	J. O. Söderhjelm (1898–1985)	2 September 1957	29 November 1957	88 days	Independent	Sukselainen I
37	Kurt Kaira	Kurt Kaira (1894–1975)	29 November 1957	26 April 1958	148 days	Independent	von Fieandt
(23)	J. O. Söderhjelm	J. O. Söderhjelm (1898–1985)	26 April 1958	29 August 1958	125 days	Independent	Kuuskoski
(30)	Sven Högström	Sven Högström (1908–1995)	29 August 1958	13 January 1959	137 days	RKP	Fagerholm III
38	Antti Hannikainen	Antti Hannikainen (1910–1976)	13 January 1959	14 April 1961	2 years, 91 days	Centre	Sukselainen II
39	Pauli Lehtosalo	Pauli Lehtosalo (1910–1989)	14 April 1961	13 April 1962	364 days	Centre	Sukselainen II; Miettunen I
(23)	J. O. Söderhjelm	J. O. Söderhjelm (1898–1985)	13 April 1962	18 December 1963	1 year, 249 days	RKP	Karjalainen I
40	Olavi Merimaa	Olavi Merimaa (1908–1970)	18 December 1963	12 September 1964	269 days	Independent	Lehto
(23)	J. O. Söderhjelm	J. O. Söderhjelm (1898–1985)	12 September 1964	27 May 1966	1 year, 257 days	RKP	Virolainen
(33)	Aarre Simonen	Aarre Simonen (1913–1977)	27 May 1966	14 May 1970	3 years, 352 days	SDP	Paasio I Koivisto I
41	Keijo Liinamaa	Keijo Liinamaa (1929–1980)	14 May 1970	15 July 1970	62 days	Independent	Aura I
42	Erkki Tuominen	Erkki Tuominen (1914–1975)	15 July 1970	26 March 1971	254 days	SKDL	Karjalainen II
43	Mikko Laaksonen	Mikko Laaksonen (1927–2006)	26 March 1971	30 September 1971	188 days	SDP	Karjalainen II
44	Jacob Söderman	Jacob Söderman (born 1938)	1 October 1971	29 October 1971	28 days	SDP	Karjalainen II
45	K. J. Lång	K. J. Lång (1934–1998)	29 October 1971	23 February 1972	117 days	Independent	Aura II
46	Pekka Paavola	Pekka Paavola (1933–2023)	23 February 1972	4 September 1972	194 days	SDP	Paasio II
47	Matti Louekoski	Matti Louekoski (born 1941)	4 September 1972	13 June 1975	2 years, 282 days	SDP	Sorsa I
48	Inkeri Anttila	Inkeri Anttila (1916–2013)	13 June 1975	30 November 1975	170 days	Independent	Liinamaa
49	Kristian Gestrin	Kristian Gestrin (1929–1990)	30 November 1975	15 May 1977	1 year, 166 days	RKP	Miettunen II-III
50	Tuure Salo	Tuure Salo (1921–2006)	15 May 1977	2 March 1978	291 days	Liberals	Sorsa II
51	Paavo Nikula	Paavo Nikula (1942–2024)	2 March 1978	26 May 1979	1 year, 85 days	Liberals	Sorsa II
52	Christoffer Taxell	Christoffer Taxell (born 1948)	26 May 1979	30 April 1987	7 years, 339 days	RKP	Koivisto II; Sorsa III-IV
(47)	Matti Louekoski	Matti Louekoski (born 1941)	30 April 1987	28 February 1990	2 years, 304 days	SDP	Holkeri
53	Tarja Halonen	Tarja Halonen (born 1943)	1 March 1990	26 April 1991	1 year, 56 days	SDP	Holkeri
54	Hannele Pokka	Hannele Pokka (born 1952)	26 April 1991	1 May 1994	3 years, 5 days	Centre	Aho
55	Anneli Jäätteenmäki	Anneli Jäätteenmäki (born 1955)	1 May 1994	13 April 1995	347 days	Centre	Aho
56	Sauli Niinistö	Sauli Niinistö (born 1948)	13 April 1995	2 February 1996	295 days	National Coalition	Lipponen I
57	Kari Häkämies	Kari Häkämies (born 1956)	2 February 1996	13 March 1998	2 years, 39 days	National Coalition	Lipponen I
58	Jussi Järventaus	Jussi Järventaus (born 1951)	13 March 1998	15 April 1999	1 year, 33 days	National Coalition	Lipponen I
59	Johannes Koskinen	Johannes Koskinen (born 1965)	15 April 1999	22 September 2005	6 years, 160 days	SDP	Lipponen II; Jäätteenmäki; Vanhanen I
60	Leena Luhtanen	Leena Luhtanen (born 1941)	23 September 2005	19 April 2007	1 year, 208 days	SDP	Vanhanen I
61	Tuija Brax	Tuija Brax (born 1965)	19 April 2007	22 June 2011	4 years, 64 days	Green	Vanhanen II; Kiviniemi
62	Anna-Maja Henriksson	Anna-Maja Henriksson (born 1964)	22 June 2011	29 May 2015	3 years, 341 days	RKP	Katainen; Stubb
63	Jari Lindström	Jari Lindström (born 1965)	29 May 2015	5 May 2017	1 year, 341 days	Finns	Sipilä
64	Antti Häkkänen	Antti Häkkänen (born 1985)	5 May 2017	6 June 2019	2 years, 32 days	National Coalition	Sipilä
(62)	Anna-Maja Henriksson	Anna-Maja Henriksson (born 1964)	6 June 2019	20 June 2023	4 years, 14 days	RKP	Rinne; Marin
65	Leena Meri	Leena Meri (born 1968)	20 June 2023	Incumbent	3 years, 49 days	Finns	Orpo
