= Linkomies cabinet =

Linkomies Cabinet
- 26th Cabinet of Finland
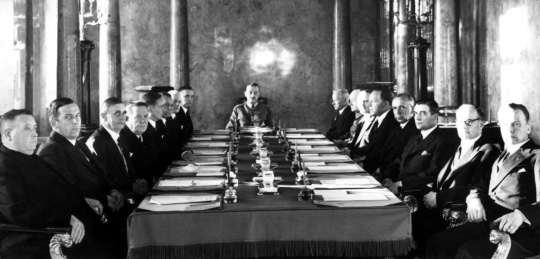
- The last session of Linkomies' government. At the end of the table the president, marshal Carl Gustaf Mannerheim, Edwin Linkomies on his left side
- Date formed: 5 March 1943
- Date dissolved: 8 August 1944

People and organisations
- Prime Minister: Edwin Linkomies
- Total no. of members: 16
- Member parties: National Coalition; National Progressive; Agrarian League; SDP; RKP
- Status in legislature: Majority government

History
- Predecessor: Rangell cabinet
- Successor: Hackzell cabinet

Edwin Linkomies's cabinet was the 26th government of Republic of Finland. The Cabinet's time period was from March 5, 1943 – August 8, 1944. It was a Majority government.

Assembly
Minister	Period of office	Party
Prime Ministeri; Edwin Linkomies	March 5, 1943 – August 8, 1944	National Coalition Party
Minister of Foreign Affairs; Henrik Ramsay	March 5, 1943 – August 8, 1944	Swedish People's Party
Minister of Justice; Oskari Lehtonen	5.3.1943 – August 8, 1944	National Coalition Party
Minister of Interior; Leo Ehrnrooth	March 5, 1943 – August 8, 1944	Swedish People's Party
Minister of Defence; Rudolf Walden	March 5, 1943 – August 8, 1944	Independent
Minister of Finance; Väinö Tanner	March 5, 1943 – August 8, 1944	Social Democrat
Deputy Minister of Finance; Tyko Reinikka	March 5, 1943 – August 8, 1944	Agrarian League
Minister of Education; Kalle Kauppi	January 4, 1941 – March 5, 1943	National Progressive Party
Minister of Agriculture; Viljami Kalliokoski	January 4, 1941 – March 5, 1943	Agrarian League
Deputy Minister of Agriculture; Nils Osara	January 4, 1941 – March 5, 1943	Independent
Minister of Transport and Public Works; Väinö Salovaara	January 4, 1941 – March 5, 1943	Social Democrat
Deputy Ministerof Transport and Public Works; Toivo Ikonen; Väinö Kaasalainen	March 5, 1943 – January 13, 1944; January 13, 1944 – September 8, 1944	Centre Party; Centre Party
Minister of Trade and Industry; Uuno Takki	January 4, 1941 – March 5, 1943	Social Democrat
Minister of Social Affairs; Karl-August Fagerholm; Aleksi Aaltonen	March 5, 1943 – December 17, 1943; December 17, 1943 – September 8, 1944	Social Democrat; Social Democrat
Minister of People's Service; Kaarle Ellilä	January 4, 1941 – March 5, 1943	Centre Party
Deputy Minister of People's Service; Jalo Aura; Nils Osara; Henrik Ramsay	March 5, 1943 – September 8, 1944; March 5, 1943 – August 8, 1944; March 5, 1943 – September 8, 1944	Social Democrat; Swedish People's Party

Preceded by Rangell	Cabinet of Finland; January 4, 1941–March 5, 1943	Succeeded by Hackzell
