= Rangell cabinet =

Government of Finland (1941-1943)

Rangell Cabinet
- 25th Cabinet of Finland
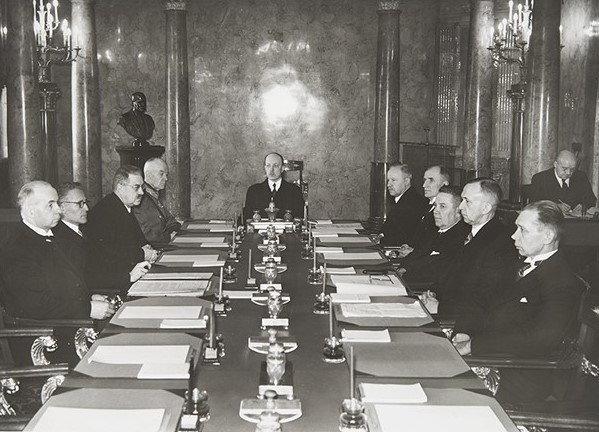
- Date formed: 3 January 1941
- Date dissolved: 5 March 1943

People and organisations
- President: Risto Ryti
- Prime Minister: Johan Wilhelm Rangell
- Total no. of members: 17
- Member parties: National Progressive; RKP; National Coalition; SDP; Agrarian League; Patriotic People's Movement
- Status in legislature: Majority government (coalition); 198 / 200 (99%)
- Opposition party: Party of Smallholders and Rural People

History
- Outgoing election: 1939
- Incoming formation: National Progressive Party; Swedish People's Party; National Coalition Party; Social Democratic Party; Agrarian League
- Predecessor: Ryti II
- Successor: Linkomies

Jukka Rangell's cabinet was the 25th government of Finland, which reigned during the Second World War for 791 days, from 4 January 1941 to 5 March 1943. It was a majority government which comprised six parties and one independent minister. The composition of the government was based largely on its predecessor, the Ryti II Cabinet.

== Ministers ==
Portfolio	Minister	Took office	Left office	Party
Prime Minister	Jukka Rangell	4 January 1941	5 March 1943	National Progressive
Minister for Foreign Affairs	Rolf Witting	4 January 1941	5 March 1943	RKP
Minister at the Ministry for Foreign Affairs	Henrik Ramsay	14 November 1941	5 March 1943	RKP
Minister of Justice	Oskari Lehtonen	4 January 1941	5 March 1943	National Coalition
Minister of the Interior	Ernst von Born	4 January 1941	13 May 1941	RKP
Minister of the Interior	Toivo Horelli	13 May 1941	5 March 1943	National Coalition
Minister of Defence	Rudolf Walden	4 January 1941	13 May 1941	Independent
Minister of Finance	Mauno Pekkala	4 January 1941	22 May 1942	SDP
Minister of Finance	Väinö Tanner	22 May 1942	5 March 1943	SDP
Minister at the Ministry of Finance	Juho Koivisto	4 January 1941	5 March 1943	Agrarian
Minister of Education	Antti Kukkonen	4 January 1941	5 March 1943	Agrarian
Minister of Agriculture	Viljami Kalliokoski	4 January 1941	5 March 1943	Agrarian
Minister at the Ministry of Agriculture	Toivo Ikonen	4 January 1941	5 March 1943	Agrarian
Minister of Transport and Public Works	Väinö Salovaara	4 January 1941	5 March 1943	SDP
Minister at the Ministry of Transport and Public Works	Vilho Annala	4 January 1941	5 March 1943	Patriotic People's Movement
Minister of Trade and Industry	Toivo Salmio	4 January 1941	3 August 1941	SDP
Minister of Trade and Industry	Väinö Tanner	3 August 1941	22 May 1942	SDP
Minister of Trade and Industry	Uuno Takki	22 May 1942	5 March 1943	SDP
Minister of Social Affairs	Karl-August Fagerholm	4 January 1941	5 March 1943	SDP
Minister of Supply	Väinö Kotilainen	4 January 1941	16 April 1941	Independent
Minister of Supply	Väinö Arola	16 April 1941	3 August 1942	Agrarian
Minister of Supply	Henrik Ramsay	3 August 1942	5 March 1943	RKP
Minister at the Ministry of Supply	Henrik Ramsay	29 October 1941	3 July 1942	RKP
Minister at the Ministry of Supply	Siivo Kantala	3 July 1942	5 March 1943	Agrarian
Minister at the Ministry of Supply	Toivo Ikonen	13 November 1942	5 March 1943	Agrarian

Preceded by Ryti II	Cabinet of Finland; January 4, 1941 – March 5, 1943	Succeeded by Linkomies
