= List of the shortest ministerial tenures in Finland =

A List of the Shorters Ministerial Tenures in Finland
Rank	Name	Party	Days in office	Dates	Position	Cabinet	Reason of resignment	References
1.	Karl Lennart Oesch	professional minister	12 days	3–14 March 1932	assistant minister of interior	Sunila Cabinet	mission accomplished	
2.	Vilhelm Junnila	Finns Party	17 days	20 June –6 July 2023	minister of economic affairs	Orpo Cabinet	alleged neo-Nazi connections	
3.	Henrik Kullberg	Swedish People's Party of Finland	18 days	17 Nov–4 Dec 1953	second minister of agriculture	Tuomioja Cabinet	death	
4.	Björn Westerlund	Swedish People's Party of Finland	26 days	19 June–14 July 1961	minister of commerce and industry	Sukselainen II Cabinet	prime minister resigned	
5.	Elias Sopanen	National Progressive Party	30 days	21 Dec 1923–18 Jan 1924	minister of justice	Kallio I Cabinet	cabinet overthrown	
6.	Samuli Sario	Finnish Party	34 days	27 May–29 June 1918	minister without portfolio	Paasikivi Senate	became head of committee on social affairs	
…								
N/A	Anders Hackzell	civil servant	45 days	8 Aug–21 Sept 1944	prime minister	Hackzell Cabinet	paralyzed	
…								
N/A	Keijo Liinamaa	civil servant	56 days	26 May–15 July 1970	minister in the ministry of finances	Aura I Cabinet	replaced by a political cabinet	
…								
N/A	Urho Castrén	civil servant	58 days	21 Sept–17 Nov 1944	prime minister	Urho Castrén Cabinet	After Eero Wuori and K.-A. Fagerholm resigned the whole cabinet resigned	
…								
N/A	Teuvo Aura	civil servant	63 days	14 May –15 July 1970	prime minister	Aura I Cabinet	replaced by a political cabinet	
…								
N/A	Anneli Jäätteenmäki	Centre Party	69 days	17 Apr –24 June 2003	prime minister	Jäätteenmäki Cabinet	Iraq leak	

- Note: All ministers in the Hackzell Cabinet had as many days in office as the prime minister, as was the case with the Urho Castrén Cabinet and Aura I Cabinet. In the last mentioned, also Minister of Justice Keijo Liinamaa served as many days (63 days), but he also functioned as a minister in the ministry of finances during 26 May –15 July 1970, i.e. 56 days.
