= Kaarlo Hillilä =

Finnish politician

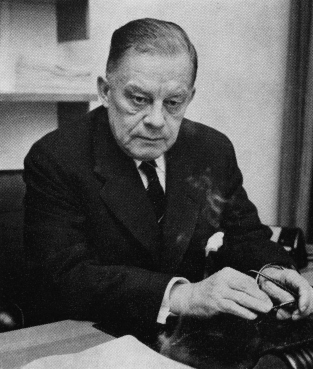

Kaarlo Henrik Hillilä (27 May 1902 – 14 May 1965) was a Finnish politician who served as the provincial governor of Lapland (1938–1947), head of the market town of Rovaniemi, minister of the interior (1944–1945), minister of supply (1945–1946), and director general of the Social Insurance Institution (1946–1954).

Hillilä took part in the battle of Oulu as a student during the Finnish Civil War with his classmate Aaro Pakaslahti in February 1918. He then went on to participate in a number of battles in the Satakunta region and in what is now the far western part of Pirkanmaa. After the civil war ended, he and his younger brother volunteered in the Estonian War of Independence as part of the Pohjan Pojat unit beginning in early 1919. They took part in the taking of Valga in southern Estonia and were then ordered to attack Marienburg (now Alūksne) on the Latvian side of the border. Caught by surprise on a reconnaissance mission, Hillilä was shot through the leg and his 15-year-old brother was killed. After leaving the Baltic states, Hillilä further volunteered in the Aunus expedition in East Karelia from May to July 1919.

Hillilä completed the matriculation exam in 1919 and began studying law at the University of Helsinki in the autumn of 1921. He befriended his roommate, fellow law student, North Ostrobothnian Nation member and future president Urho Kekkonen. Apart from student nations, activities of the newly-founded Academic Karelia Society were another common political outlet for students of the time. Also like Kekkonen, Hillilä made additional earnings working for Etsivä keskuspoliisi, the predecessor of today's Finnish Security Intelligence Service. During their studies, Hillilä, Kekkonen and Aaro Pakaslahti formed a tight-knit cooperative relationship which came to be influential from the late 1930s to the late 1940s.

Politically, Hillilä belonged to the Agrarian League. He was chosen as a presidential elector in 1937 and voted for Kyösti Kallio. He later voted for Risto Ryti in 1940 and 1943.

Hillilä completed his bachelor's degree in law in 1926 and earned the title of varatuomari in 1929 (indicating completion of a master's degree and a year of court training). That year, he took office as the head of the market town of Rovaniemi, a position he filled on two separate occasions before his appointment as provincial governor of Lapland. After Kekkonen became the Minister of the Interior and started plotting the abolition of the Patriotic People's Movement, Hillilä provided him with background research, but the plans were not realised at that point in time.

Hillilä was chosen as the first provincial governor of Finnish Lapland in 1938 when that province was formed. The area, and thus the entirety of Northern Finland, had previously belonged to the Oulu Province. Hillilä's tenure was marked by war, particularly the Continuation War when 200,000 German soldiers were deployed in Northern Finland. Lieutenant general Eduard Dietl represented the Germans to the local civilian administration. Hillilä sought to protect Finnish interests under these circumstances. On a flying visit to Lapland in early 1942, Reichsführer-SS Heinrich Himmler told Hillilä rather openly about ethnic cleansings targeting Jews and Roma people in Germany and its occupied areas.

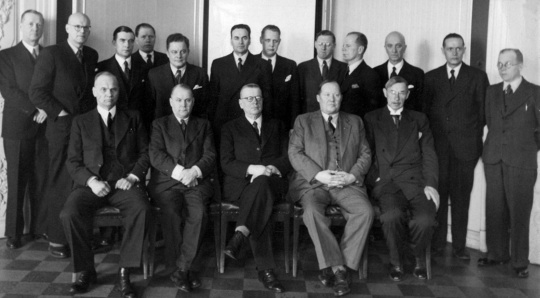
Third Paasikivi Cabinet: Minister of Supply Kaarlo Hillilä is fifth from the left in the back row.

The cooperation with Kekkonen and Pakaslahti remained close during the war. Another central partner was Kustaa Vilkuna. Hillilä and Pakaslahti acted above all as conversation partners and informants to Kekkonen while he wrote reports on military policy for Suomen Kuvalehti under the pen name "Pekka Peitsi". Hillilä was one of those who alongside Kekkonen came to the conclusion in November 1942 that Germany, and Finland with it, would lose the war.

Hillilä was the Peace opposition's candidate for prime minister after Marshal Mannerheim's ascension to the presidency in August 1944, but he became Minister of the Interior in the Hackzell Cabinet instead. Thus he took a leave of absence from the provincial governorship which would last until 1946 while he took care of ministerial responsibilities in postwar cabinets. The Ministry of the Interior was important in transitioning to a state of peace in September. At that point an Allied Supervisory Commission led by the Soviet Union came to Finland to carry out police affairs through the Ministry of the Interior. The demobilisation of the army, the question of the Karelian evacuees and the Lapland War would have concerned the Minister of the Interior in particular. Hillilä was even ready to hand over prominent Finns to appease the Soviet Union in late 1944.

The legalisation of the previously banned far left, such as the Communist Party of Finland, was a major motion toward a new direction for Hillilä. Kekkonen as Minister of Justice and Hillilä were ready to collaborate with the far left by this point. Hillilä also remained as Minister of the Interior in the Castrén Cabinet and the Second Paasikivi Cabinet until he was appointed Minister of Supply in the Third Paasikivi Cabinet formed after the March 1945 parliamentary elections. Together with Kekkonen, he actively supported the replacement of Mannerheim with Paasikivi in the presidency.

While he would have had political value in the new post-war conditions, a hard life had taken its toll on Hillilä. He could no longer take active responsibility. He returned to his post as provincial governor of Lapland from 1946 to 1947 and then moved to Helsinki to serve as director general of the Social Insurance Institution (SII). He lost this position on 14 October 1954, but Kekkonen soon appointed him to the board of the Institution. Upon appointing Hillilä, Kekkonen forced him to sign an undated resignation letter which Kekkonen deposited in his safe. Hillilä's career finally ended with a scandal regarding the legality of the SII staff's living arrangements in the summer of 1961, though his criminal misconduct conviction was commuted to a "minor misconduct" or "maladministration" in the Supreme Court.

== Sources ==
- Translated from the Finnish Wikipedia
- Tuikka, Timo J. (2011). Kekkosen takapiru: Kaarlo Hillilän uskomaton elämä. Helsinki: Otava. ISBN 978-951-1-25226-9.
- Uola, Mikko: ”Hillilä, Kaarlo (1902–1965)”, Suomen kansallisbiografia, osa 3, s. 817–820. Helsinki: Suomalaisen Kirjallisuuden Seura, 2004. ISBN 951-746-444-4 / Online version (subscription required)
- Kaarlo Hillilä Suomen ministerit. Valtioneuvosto.
- Historiaa. Lapin lääninhallitus. Web Archive. Referenced 5 July 2015.
- Hillilä, Kaarlo in Uppslagsverket Finland (2012). (In Swedish)

Political offices
Preceded by Position established	Provincial Governor of Lapland; 1938–1947 (on leave 1944–1946)	Succeeded by Uuno Hannula
Preceded by Leo Ehrnrooth	Minister of the Interior (Finland); 1944–1945	Succeeded by Yrjö Leino
Preceded by Kalle Jutila	Minister of Supply (Finland); 1945–1946	Succeeded by Taavi Vilhula
