= Kallio IV cabinet =

21st government of Republic of Finland

Kallio IV Cabinet
- 21st Cabinet of Finland
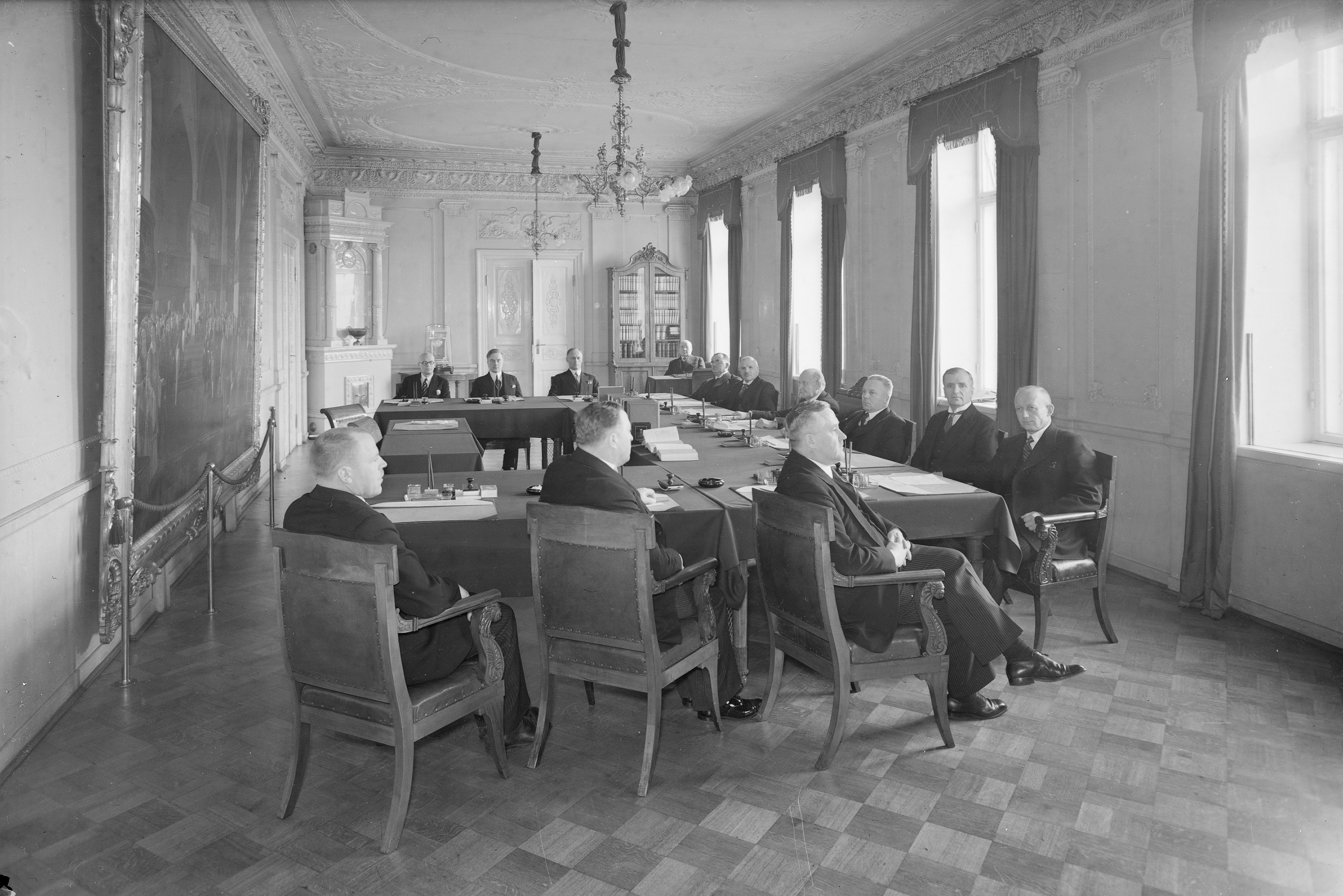
- Cabinet meeting
- Date formed: 7 October 1936
- Date dissolved: 12 March 1937

People and organisations
- Prime Minister: Kyösti Kallio
- Total no. of members: 15
- Member parties: Agrarian League; National Progressive
- Status in legislature: Minority government

History
- Predecessor: Kivimäki
- Successor: Cajander III

Kyösti Kallio's fourth cabinet was the 21st government of Republic of Finland. Cabinet's time period was from October 7, 1936 to March 12, 1937. It was Minority government.

Assembly
Minister	Period of office	Party
Prime Minister; Kyösti Kallio	October 7, 1936 – March 12, 1937	Agrarian League
Deputy Prime Minister; Rudolf Holsti	October 7, 1936 – March 12, 1937	National Progressive Party
Minister for Foreign Affairs; Rudolf Holsti	October 7, 1936 – March 12, 1937	National Progressive Party
Minister of Justice; Urho Kekkonen	October 7, 1936 – March 12, 1937	Agrarian League
Minister of Defence; Arvi Oksala	October 7, 1936 – March 12, 1937	Independent
Minister of the Interior; Yrjö Puhakka	October 7, 1936 – March 12, 1937	Independent
Deputy Minister of the Interior; Urho Kekkonen	October 7, 1936 – March 12, 1937	Agrarian League
Minister of Finance; Juho Niukkanen	October 7, 1936 – March 12, 1937	Agrarian League
Minister of Education; Antti Kukkonen	October 7, 1936 – March 12, 1937	Agrarian League
Minister of Agriculture; Pekka Heikkinen	October 7, 1936 – March 12, 1937	Agrarian League
Deputy Minister of Agriculture; Viljami Kalliokoski	October 7, 1936 – March 12, 1937	Agrarian League
Minister of Transport and Public Works; Jalo Lahdensuo	October 7, 1936 – March 12, 1937	Agrarian League
Deputy Minister of Transport and Public Works; Vihtori Vesterinen	October 7, 1936 – March 12, 1937	Agrarian League
Minister of Trade and Industry; Kalle Kauppi	October 7, 1936 – March 12, 1937	National Progressive Party
Minister of Social Affairs; Toivo Janhonen	October 7, 1936 – March 12, 1937	Agrarian League

Preceded by Kivimäki	Cabinet of Finland; October 7, 1936–March 12, 1937	Succeeded by Cajander III
