= Kalle Kauppi =

Kalle Kauppi may refer to:

- Kalle Kauppi (footballer)
- Kalle Kauppi (politician)
