= Urho Castrén cabinet =

Urho Castrén Cabinet
- 28th Cabinet of Finland
- Date formed: 21 September 1944
- Date dissolved: 17 November 1944

People and organisations
- Prime Minister: Urho Castrén
- Total no. of members: 16
- Member parties: National Coalition; National Progressive; Agrarian League; SDP; RKP
- Status in legislature: Majority government

History
- Predecessor: Hackzell
- Successor: Paasikivi II

Urho Castrén's cabinet was the 28th government of Republic of Finland, in office from September 21, 1944, to November 17, 1944. It was a majority government.

== Ministers ==
Portfolio	Minister	Took office	Left office	Party	Ref
Prime Minister	Urho Castrén	September 21, 1944	November 17, 1944	National Coalition	
Minister of Foreign Affairs	Carl Enckell	September 21, 1944	November 17, 1944	Independent	
Deputy Minister of Foreign Affairs	Armas-Eino Martola	September 21, 1944	November 17, 1944	Independent	
Minister of Justice	Ernst von Born	September 21, 1944	November 17, 1944	RKP	
Minister of Interior	Kaarlo Hillilä	September 21, 1944	November 17, 1944	Agrarian	
Deputy Minister of Interior	Eemil Luukka	September 21, 1944	November 17, 1944	Agrarian	
Minister of Defence	Rudolf Walden	September 21, 1944	November 17, 1944	Independent	
Minister of Finance	Onni Hiltunen	September 21, 1944	November 17, 1944	SDP	
Minister of Education	Kalle Kauppi	September 21, 1944	November 17, 1944	National Progressive	
Minister of Agriculture	Viljami Kalliokoski	September 21, 1944	November 17, 1944	Agrarian	
Minister of Transport and Public Works	Väinö Salovaara	September 21, 1944	November 17, 1944	SDP	
Deputy Minister of Transport and Public Works	Eero Wuori	September 21, 1944	November 17, 1944	SDP	
Minister of Trade and Industry	Uuno Takki	September 21, 1944	November 17, 1944	SDP	
Minister of Social Affairs	Karl-August Fagerholm	September 21, 1944	November 17, 1944	SDP	
Minister of People's Service	Kaarle Ellilä	September 21, 1944	November 17, 1944	Agrarian	
Deputy Minister of People's Service	Jalo Aura	September 21, 1944	November 17, 1944	SDP	

Preceded by Hackzell	Cabinet of Finland; September 21, 1944 – November 17, 1944	Succeeded by Paasikivi II
