= Castrén Cabinet =

Castrén Cabinet may refer to:

- Kaarlo Castrén Cabinet, 4th Government of Finland
- Urho Castrén Cabinet, 28th Government of Finland
