= Hackzell cabinet =

Hackzell Cabinet
- 27th Cabinet of Finland
- Date formed: 8 August 1944
- Date dissolved: 21 September 1944

People and organisations
- Prime Minister: Antti Hackzell
- Total no. of members: 15
- Member parties: National Coalition; National Progressive; Agrarian League; SDP; RKP
- Status in legislature: Majority government

History
- Predecessor: Linkomies
- Successor: Urho Castrén

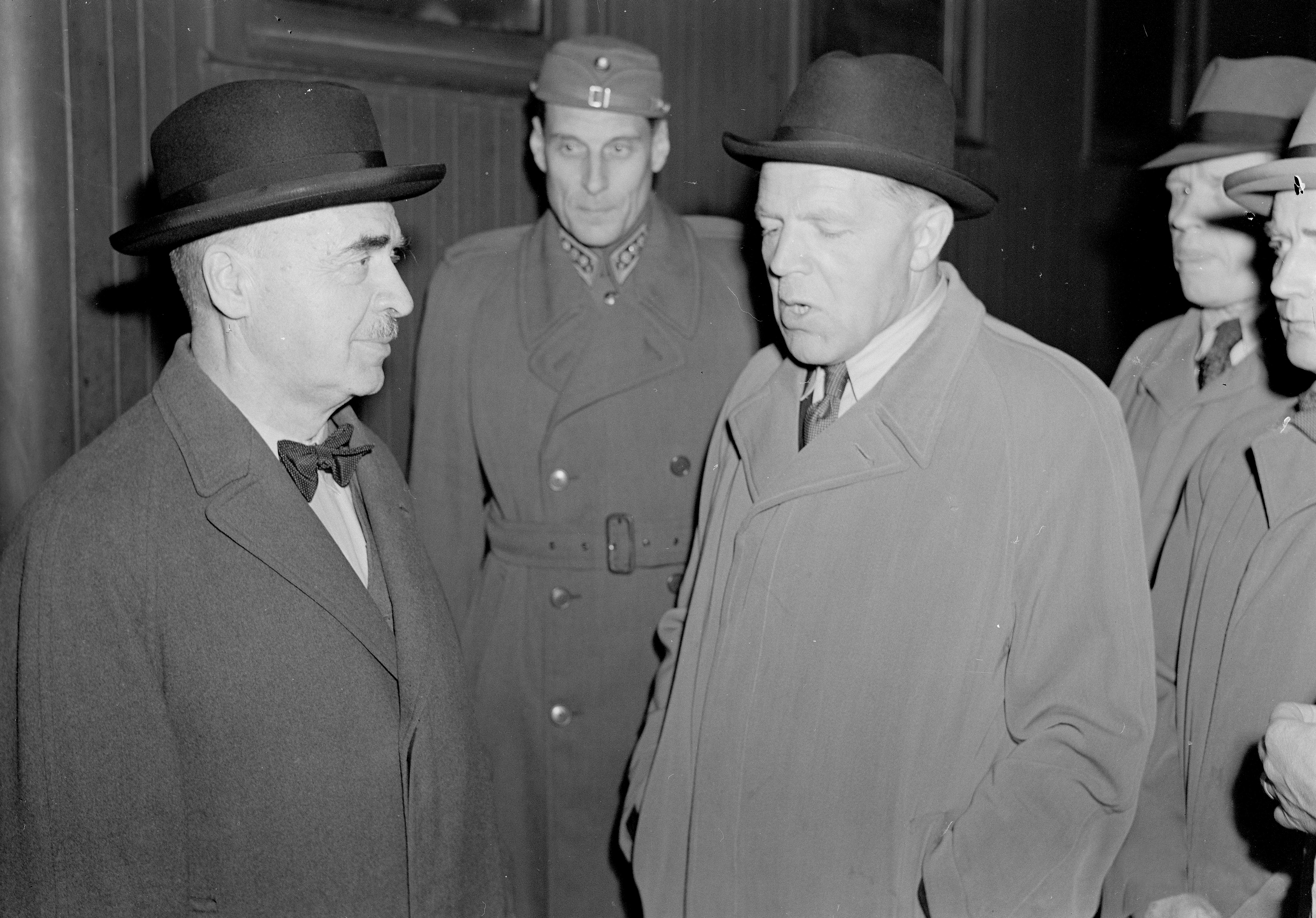
Prime minister Hackzell's (left) traveling to Moscow; Deputy Minister of Finance, Olli Paloheimo (middle), and Minister of Agriculture, Viljami Kalliokoski

Antti Hackzell's cabinet was the 27th government of Republic of Finland. Cabinet's time period was from August 8, 1944, to September 21, 1944. It was a majority government.

Hackzell's government's main task was to get Finland out of the war against the Soviet Union. At the end of August Antti Hackzell obtained a negotiation link with Moscow and on September 2 the government agreed to an armistice which started two days later.

Hackzell travelled to Moscow to negotiate the peace treaty but he suffered a bad stroke on September 14 and couldn no longer continue his work as minister. Foreign minister Carl Enckell succeeded him in making the Moscow Armistice treaty. New prime minister Urho Castrén took office and formed a new cabinet.

Assembly
Minister	Period of office	Party
Prime Minister; Antti Hackzell	August 8, 1944 – September 21, 1944	Independent
Minister of Foreign Affairs; Carl Enckell	August 8, 1944 – September 21, 1944	Independent
Minister of Justice; Ernst von Born	August 8, 1944 – September 21, 1944	Swedish People's Party
Minister of Interior; Kaarlo Hillilä	August 8, 1944 – September 21, 1944	Agrarian League
Deputy Minister of Interior; Eemil Luukka	August 8, 1944 – September 21, 1944	Agrarian League
Minister of Defence; Rudolf Walden	August 8, 1944 – September 21, 1944	Independent
Minister of Finance; Onni Hiltunen	August 8, 1944 – September 21, 1944	Social Democrat
Deputy Minister of Finance; Olli Paloheimo	August 8, 1944 – September 21, 1944	National Coalition Party
Minister of Education; Kalle Kauppi	August 8, 1944 – September 21, 1944	National Progressive Party
Minister of Agriculture; Viljami Kalliokoski	August 8, 1944 – September 21, 1944	Agrarian League
Minister of Transport and Public Works; Väinö Salovaara	August 8, 1944 – September 21, 1944	Social Democrat
Minister of Trade and Industry; Uuno Takki	August 8, 1944 – September 21, 1944	Social Democrat
Minister of Social Affairs; Aleksi Aaltonen	August 8, 1944 – September 21, 1944	Social Democrat
Minister of People's Service; Kaarle Ellilä	August 8, 1944 – September 21, 1944	Agrarian League
Deputy Minister of People's Service; Jalo Aura	August 8, 1944 – September 21, 1944	Social Democrat

Preceded by Linkomies	Cabinet of Finland; August 8, 1944 – September 21, 1944	Succeeded by U. Castrén
