= Solja =

Surname list

Solja is a surname. Notable people with the surname include:

- Amelie Solja (born 1990), Austrian table tennis player
- Niilo Solja (1888–1967), Finnish jurist and politician
- Petrissa Solja (born 1994), German table tennis player
