= Ryti II cabinet =

Government of Finland from 1940 to 1941

Ryti II Cabinet
- 24th Cabinet of Finland
- Date formed: 27 March 1940
- Date dissolved: 4 January 1941

People and organisations
- Prime Minister: Risto Ryti
- Total no. of members: 17
- Member parties: National Progressive; Agrarian League; SDP; RKP
- Status in legislature: Majority government

History
- Predecessor: Ryti I
- Successor: Rangell

Risto Ryti's second cabinet was the 24th government of Republic of Finland.

Cabinet's time period was from March 27, 1940, to January 4, 1941. It was Majority government.

Assembly
Minister	Period of office	Party
Prime Minister; Risto Ryti	March 27, 1940 – December 19, 1940	National Progressive Party
Deputy Prime Minister; Rudolf Walden	December 19, 1940 – January 4, 1941	Independent
Minister for Foreign Affairs; Rolf Witting	March 27, 1940 – January 4, 1941	Swedish People's Party
Minister of Justice; Oskari Lehtonen	March 27, 1940 – January 4, 1941	National Coalition Party
Minister of Interior; Ernst von Born	March 27, 1940 – January 4, 1941	Swedish People's Party
Deputy Minister of Interior; Eemil Luukka	March 27, 1940 – January 4, 1941	Agrarian League
Minister of Defence; Rudolf Walden	March 27, 1940 – January 4, 1941	Independent
Minister of Finance; Mauno Pekkala	March 27, 1940 – January 4, 1941	Social Democrat
Deputy Minister of Finance; Juho Pilppula	March 27, 1940 – January 4, 1941	Agrarian League
Minister of Education; Antti Kukkonen	March 27, 1940 – January 4, 1941	Agrarian League
Minister of Agriculture; Antti Kukkonen; Viljami Kalliokoski	March 27, 1940 – August 15, 1940; August 15, 1940 – January 4, 1941	Agrarian League; Agrarian League
Minister of Transport and Public Works; Väinö Salovaara	March 27, 1940 – January 4, 1941	Social Democrat
Deputy Minister of Transport and Public Works; Karl-Erik Ekholm	March 27, 1940 – January 4, 1941	Independent
Minister of Trade and Industry; Väinö Kotilainen; Toivo Salmio	March 27, 1940 – September 15, 1940; September 15, 1940 – January 4, 1941	Independent; Social Democrat
Minister of Social Affairs; Karl-August Fagerholm	March 27, 1940 – January 4, 1941	Social Democrat
Minister of People's Service; Väinö Tanner; Väinö Kotilainen	March 27, 1940 – September 15, 1940; September 15, 1940 – January 4, 1941	Social Democrat; Social Democrat
Deputy Minister of People's Service; Toivo Salmio	March 27, 1940 – January 4, 1941	Social Democrat

Preceded by Ryti I	Cabinet of Finland; March 27, 1940 – January 4, 1941	Succeeded by Rangell
