= Svinhufvud II cabinet =

Government of Finland from 1930 to 1931

Svinhufvud II Cabinet
- 18th Cabinet of Finland
- Date formed: 4 July 1930
- Date dissolved: 21 March 1931

People and organisations
- Prime Minister: Pehr Evind Svinhufvud
- Total no. of members: 13
- Member parties: National Coalition; Agrarian League; RKP; National Progressive
- Status in legislature: Majority government

History
- Predecessor: Kallio III
- Successor: Sunila II

Pehr Evind Svinhufvud's second cabinet was the 18th government of Republic of Finland. This Cabinet's time period was from July 4, 1930 to March 21, 1931. It was a majority government.

Assembly
Minister	Period of office	Party
Prime Minister; Pehr Evind Svinhufvud	July 4, 1930–March 21, 1931	National Coalition Party
Deputy Prime Minister; Juho Vennola	July 4, 1930–March 21, 1931	National Progressive Party
Minister of Foreign Affairs; Hjalmar Procopé	July 4, 1930–March 21, 1931	Independent
Minister of Justice; Karl Söderholm	July 4, 1930–March 21, 1931	Swedish People's Party
Minister of Defence; Albin Manner	July 4, 1930–March 21, 1931	Agrarian League
Deputy Minister of Defence; Albin Manner; Hugo Österman	August 4, 1930–August 10, 1930; August 10, 1930–March 21, 1931	Agrarian League; Independent
Minister of the Interior; Erkki Kuokkanen	July 4, 1930–March 21, 1931	National Coalition Party
Minister of Finance; Juho Vennola	July 4, 1930–March 21, 1931	National Progressive Party
Minister of Education; Paavo Virkkunen	July 4, 1930–March 21, 1931	National Coalition Party
Minister of Agriculture; August Raatikainen	July 4, 1930–March 21, 1931	Agrarian League
Deputy Minister of Agriculture; Juho Koivisto	July 4, 1930–March 21, 1931	Agrarian League
Minister of Transport and Public Works; Rolf Witting	July 4, 1930–March 21, 1931	Swedish People's Party
Minister of Trade and Industry; Axel Solitander	July 4, 1930–March 21, 1931	Independent
Minister of Social Affairs; Eino Tuomivaara	July 4, 1930–March 21, 1931	Agrarian League

Preceded by Kallio III	Cabinet of Finland; July 4, 1930–March 21, 1931	Succeeded by Sunila II
