= Hjalmar Granfelt =

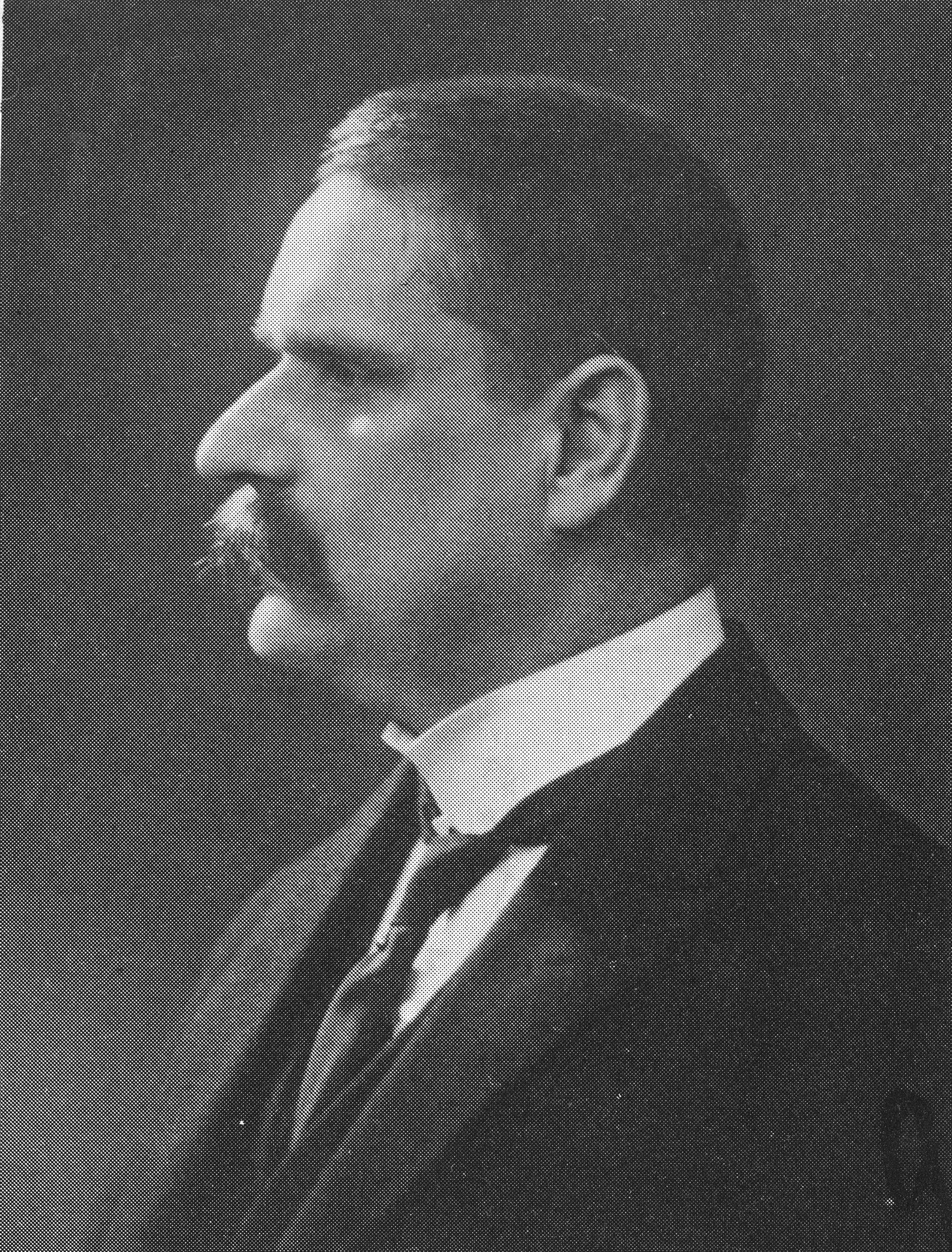
Otto Hjalmar Granfelt

Otto Hjalmar Granfelt (15 November 1874 in Turku — 25 June 1957 in Turku) was a Finnish legal scholar, professor and politician. He served as Minister of Justice from 28 June 1920 to 9 April 1921. He was a member of the Swedish People's Party of Finland (SFP).
