= Sunila II cabinet =

Sunila II Cabinet
- 19th Cabinet of Finland
- Date formed: 21 March 1931
- Date dissolved: 14 December 1932

People and organisations
- Prime Minister: Juho Sunila
- Member parties: Agrarian League; National Coalition; RKP; National Progressive
- Status in legislature: Majority government

History
- Predecessor: Svinhufvud II
- Successor: Kivimäki

Juho Sunila's second cabinet was the 19th government of Republic of Finland. This Cabinet's time period was from March 21, 1931–December 14, 1932. It was a majority government.

Assembly
Minister	Period of office	Party
Prime Minister; Juho Sunila	March 21, 1931–December 14, 1932	Agrarian League
Minister for Foreign Affairs; Aarno Yrjö-Koskinen	March 21, 1931–December 14, 1932	National Coalition Party
Minister of Justice; Toivo Kivimäki	March 21, 1931–December 14, 1932	National Progressive Party
Minister of Defence; Jalo Lahdensuo	March 21, 1931–December 14, 1932	Agrarian League
Minister of the Interior; Ernst von Born	March 21, 1931–December 14, 1932	Swedish People's Party
Deputy Minister of the Interior; Niilo Solja; Lennart Oesch; Arvo Manner; Eljas Erkko	March 21, 1931-March 3, 1932; March 3, 1932-March 14, 1932; March 14, 1932-October 20, 1932; November 25, 1932-December 14, 1932	National Coalition Party; Independent; Independent; National Progressive Party
Minister of Finance; Kyösti Järvinen	March 21, 1931–December 14, 1932	National Coalition Party
Minister of Education; Antti Kukkonen	March 21, 1931–December 14, 1932	Agrarian League
Minister of Agriculture; Sigurd Mattsson	March 21, 1931–December 14, 1932	Agrarian League
Deputy Minister of Agriculture; Pekka Heikkinen	March 21, 1931–December 14, 1932	Agrarian League
Minister of Transport and Public Works; Juho Niukkanen	March 21, 1931–December 14, 1932	Agrarian League
Minister of Trade and Industry; Axel Palmgren	March 21, 1931–December 14, 1932	Swedish People's Party
Minister of Social Affairs; Eino Tuomivaara	March 21, 1931-March 3, 1932; March 3, 1932-October 10, 1932; October 20, 1932-December 14, 1932	National Coalition Party; National Coalition Party; Agrarian League
Minister without Portfolio; Eljas Erkko	March 21, 1931–December 14, 1932	National Progressive Party

Preceded by Svinhufvud II	Cabinet of Finland; March 21, 1931–December 14, 1932	Succeeded by Kivimäki
