= Paasikivi II cabinet =

Government of Finland from 1944 to 1945

Paasikivi II Cabinet
- 29th Cabinet of Finland
- Date formed: 17 November 1944
- Date dissolved: 17 April 1945

People and organisations
- Prime Minister: Juho Kusti Paasikivi
- Total no. of members: 18
- Member parties: National Progressive; Agrarian League; SDP; RKP; SKDL
- Status in legislature: Majority government

History
- Predecessor: U. Castrén
- Successor: Paasikivi III

Juho Kusti Paasikivi's cabinet was the 29th government of Republic of Finland. The cabinet's time period was from November 17, 1944 to April 17, 1945 . It was a majority government.

Paasikivi's second cabinet's main tasks were to create jobs for ex-soldiers. The Lapland War continued as German Army had to be pushed away from Northern Finland. Allied Commission had the main power in the country led by the Soviet Union. War in Europe continued.

== Cabinet members ==
The members of the Paasikivi's cabinet were as follows:

Assembly
Minister	Period of office	Party
Prime Minister; Juho Kusti Paasikivi	November 17, 1944 – April 17, 1945	Independent
Minister in Council of State; Mauno Pekkala	November 17, 1944 – April 17, 1945	Social Democrat
Minister of Foreign Affairs; Carl Enckell	November 17, 1944 – April 17, 1945	Independent
Deputy Minister of Foreign Affairs; Reinhold Svento	November 17, 1944 – April 17, 1945	Social Democrat
Minister of Justice; Urho Kekkonen	November 17, 1944 – April 17, 1945	Agrarian League
Minister of Interior; Kaarlo Hillilä	November 17, 1944 – April 17, 1945	Agrarian League
Minister of Defence; Rudolf Walden; Väinö Valve	November 17,.1944 –December 1, 1944; December 1, 1944 – April 17, 1945	Independent
Minister of Finance; Johan Helo	November 17, 1944 – April 17, 1945	Social Democrat
Deputy Minister of Finance; Sakari Tuomioja	November 17, 1944 – April 17, 1945	National Progressive Party
Minister of Education; Uuno Takki	November 17, 1944 – April 17, 1945	Agrarian League
Minister of Agriculture; Eemil Luukka	November 17, 1944 – April 17, 1945	Agrarian League
Minister of Transport and Public Works; Eero A. Wuori	November 17, 1944 – April 17, 1945	Social Democrat
Deputy Minister of Transport and Public Works; Onni Hiltunen	November 17, 1944 – April 17, 1945	Social Democrat
Minister of Trade and Industry; Åke Gartz	November 17, 1944 – April 17, 1945	Independent
Minister of Social Affairs; Ralf Törngren	November 17, 1944 – April 17, 1945	Swedish People's Party
Deputy Minister of Social Affairs; Yrjö Leino	November 17, 1944 – April 17, 1945	People's Democratic League
Minister of People's Service; Kalle Jutila	November 17, 1944 – April 17, 1945	Agrarian League
Deputy Minister of People's Service; Jalo Aura	November 17, 1944 – April 17, 1945	Social Democrat

Preceded by U. Castrén	Cabinet of Finland; November 17, 1944–April 17, 1945	Succeeded by Paasikivi III
