= Antti Kukkonen =

Finnish Lutheran pastor and politician (1889–1978)

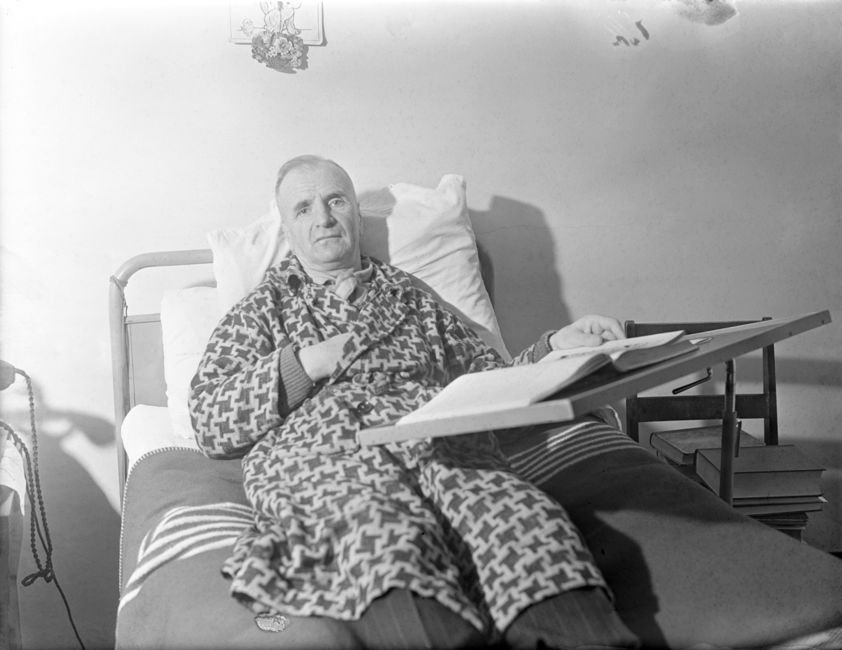
Antti Kukkonen

Antti Kukkonen (3 October 1889 – 14 February 1978) was a Finnish Lutheran pastor and politician. He was a member of the Agrarian League. He served as Deputy Minister of Education in Lauri Ingman's second cabinet (31 May 1924 – 22 November 1924), as Minister of Education in Juho Sunila's first cabinet (17 December 1927 – 22 December 1928), in Kyösti Kallio's third cabinet (16 August 1929 – 4 July 1930), in Juho Sunila's second cabinet (21 March 1931 – 14 December 1932), in Kyösti Kallio's fourth cabinet (7 October 1936 – 12 March 1937), in Risto Ryti's second cabinet (27 March 1940 – 4 December 1941) and in Jukka Rangell's cabinet (4 January 1941 – 5 March 1943) as well as a Member of Parliament (1 April 1919 – 5 April 1945 and 29 March 1954 – 19 February 1962).

Kukkonen was sentenced to 2 years of imprisonment in the war-responsibility trials in Finland. He was released in October 1947.
