= Anton Kotonen =

Finnish politician (1876–1936)

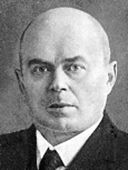

Minister of Justice
- In office 22 December 1928 – 18 February 1929

Personal details
- Born: 1876 Virolahti, Finland
- Died: 1936 (aged 59–60) Helsinki, Finland
- Party: Social Democratic Party of Finland
- Occupation: Jurist

Anton Kotonen (1876–1936) was a jurist who played an active role in shaping the Finland's governmental form. He was a member of the Parliament for the Social Democratic Party of Finland and served as the minister of justice between 1928 and 1929.

== Early life and education ==
Kotonen was born in Virolahti in 1876. He obtained a degree in law in 1902.

== Career ==
Kotonen became a deputy judge in 1905. He was the mayor of Sortavala for one year between 1904 and 1905. Then he acted as the chief Legal adviser of the town from 1906 to 1907. He also began to work as a lawyer from 1906.

Kotonen was first elected to the Parliament for the Social Democratic Party on 1 June 1909, and his term ended on 1 February 1914. He was again elected as a deputy on 1 April 1919 and served at the Parliament until 4 September 1922.

Kotonen was one of the three members of the committee which designed the Finland's republican form of government in 1917. The other committee members were Kaarlo Juhani Ståhlberg and Rabbe Axel Wrede. Kotonen was a member of the legislative council in Helsinki from 1921 to 1928. He was the secretary of the Parliament between 1929 and 1936.

Kotonen was appointed minister of justice on 22 December 1928 and was in office until 18 February 1929.

== Death ==
Kotonen died in Helsinki in 1936.
