= Kivimäki cabinet =

20th government of the Republic of Finland

Kivimäki Cabinet
- 20th Cabinet of Finland
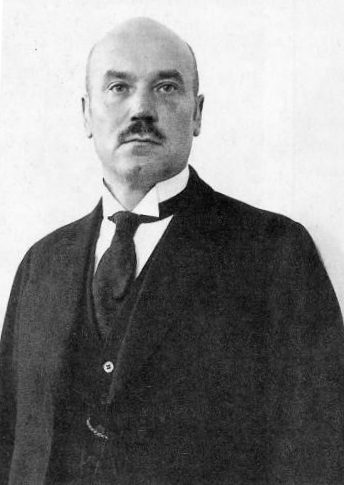
- Date formed: 14 December 1932
- Date dissolved: 7 October 1936

People and organisations
- Prime Minister: Toivo Mikael Kivimäki
- Total no. of members: 15
- Member parties: National Progressive; Agrarian League; RKP (until 28 February 1936)
- Status in legislature: Minority government

History
- Predecessor: Sunila II
- Successor: Kallio IV

Toivo Kivimäki's cabinet was the 20th government of the Republic of Finland. Cabinet's time period was from December 14, 1932 to October 10, 1936. It was Minority government. Many of the neutral ministers were members of the National Coalition Party without formal support of the party. Cabinet fell in 1936 by the interpellation of the opposition after its bill to reinstate the capital punishment had failed to pass. Kivimäki's cabinet was the longest government in Finland until 1987 Kalevi Sorsa's fourth cabinet.

Portfolio	Minister	Took office	Left office	Party	Ref
Prime Minister	Toivo Kivimäki	December 14, 1932	October 10, 1936	National Progressive	
Minister for Foreign Affairs	Antti Hackzell	December 14, 1932	October 10, 1936	Independent	
Deputy Minister for Foreign Affairs	Rolf Witting	December 14, 1932	October 10, 1936	RKP	
Minister of Justice	Hugo Malmberg	December 14, 1932	February 27, 1933	RKP	
Minister of Justice	Eric J. Serlachius	February 27, 1933	February 28, 1936	RKP	
Minister of Justice	Emil Jatkola	March 6, 1936	October 7, 1936	National Progressive	
Minister of Defence	Arvi Oksala	December 14, 1932	October 10, 1936	Independent	
Minister of the Interior	Yrjö Puhakka	December 14, 1932	October 10, 1936	Independent	
Minister of Finance	Hugo Relander	March 21, 1931	December 14, 1932	Independent	
Deputy Minister of Finance	Ragnar Furuhjelm	December 14, 1932	April 21, 1933	RKP	
Deputy Minister of Finance	Rolf Witting	April 21, 1933	February 28, 1936	RKP	
Deputy Minister of Finance	Tyko Reinikka	March 6, 1936	October 7, 1936	Agrarian	
Minister of Education	Oskari Mantere	March 21, 1931	December 14, 1932	National Progressive	
Minister of Agriculture	Kalle Jutila	December 14, 1932	October 25, 1936	Agrarian	
Minister of Agriculture	Eemil Linna	September 25, 1936	October 7, 1936	National Progressive	
Deputy Minister of Agriculture	Eemil Linna	March 21, 1931	December 14, 1932	Agrarian	
Minister of Transport and Public Works	Eemil Linna	December 14, 1932	September 25, 1936	National Progressive	
Minister of Transport and Public Works	Erik Koskenmaa	September 25, 1936	August 7, 1936	Independent	
Deputy Minister of Transport and Public Works	Erik Koskenmaa	December 14, 1932	October 10, 1936	Independent	
Minister of Trade and Industry	Ilmari Killinen	December 30, 1932	March 6, 1936	National Progressive	
Minister of Trade and Industry	Väinö Arola	March 6, 1936	October 7, 1936	Agrarian	
Minister of Social Affairs	Eemil Hynninen	December 14, 1932	December 31, 1935	Agrarian	
Minister of Social Affairs	Bruno Sarlin	December 31, 1935	October 7, 1936	National Progressive	

Preceded by Sunila	Cabinet of Finland; December 14, 1932–October 10, 1936	Succeeded by Kallio
