= Otto Åkesson =

Finnish politician

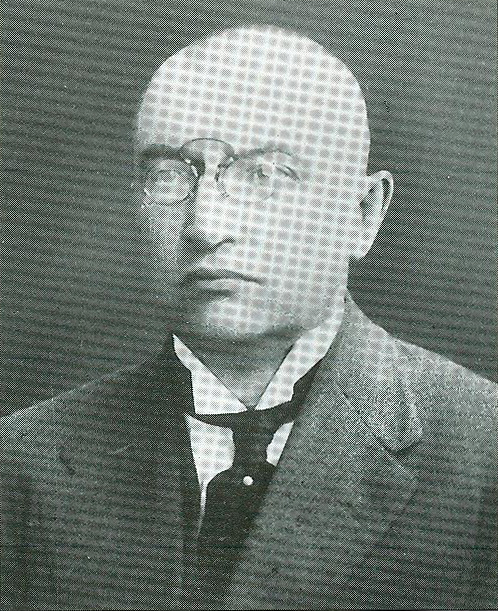
Otto Åkesson

Ernst Otto Åkesson (14 October 1872, Viipuri - 29 November 1939) was a Swedish-speaking Finnish lawyer and politician. He served as Minister of Justice of Finland from 14 November 1922 to 21 December 1923. He was a member of the Parliament of Finland, representing the Swedish People's Party of Finland (SFP) from 1917 to 1919 and the Agrarian League from 1922 to 1924.
