= Karl Söderholm =

Finnish politician

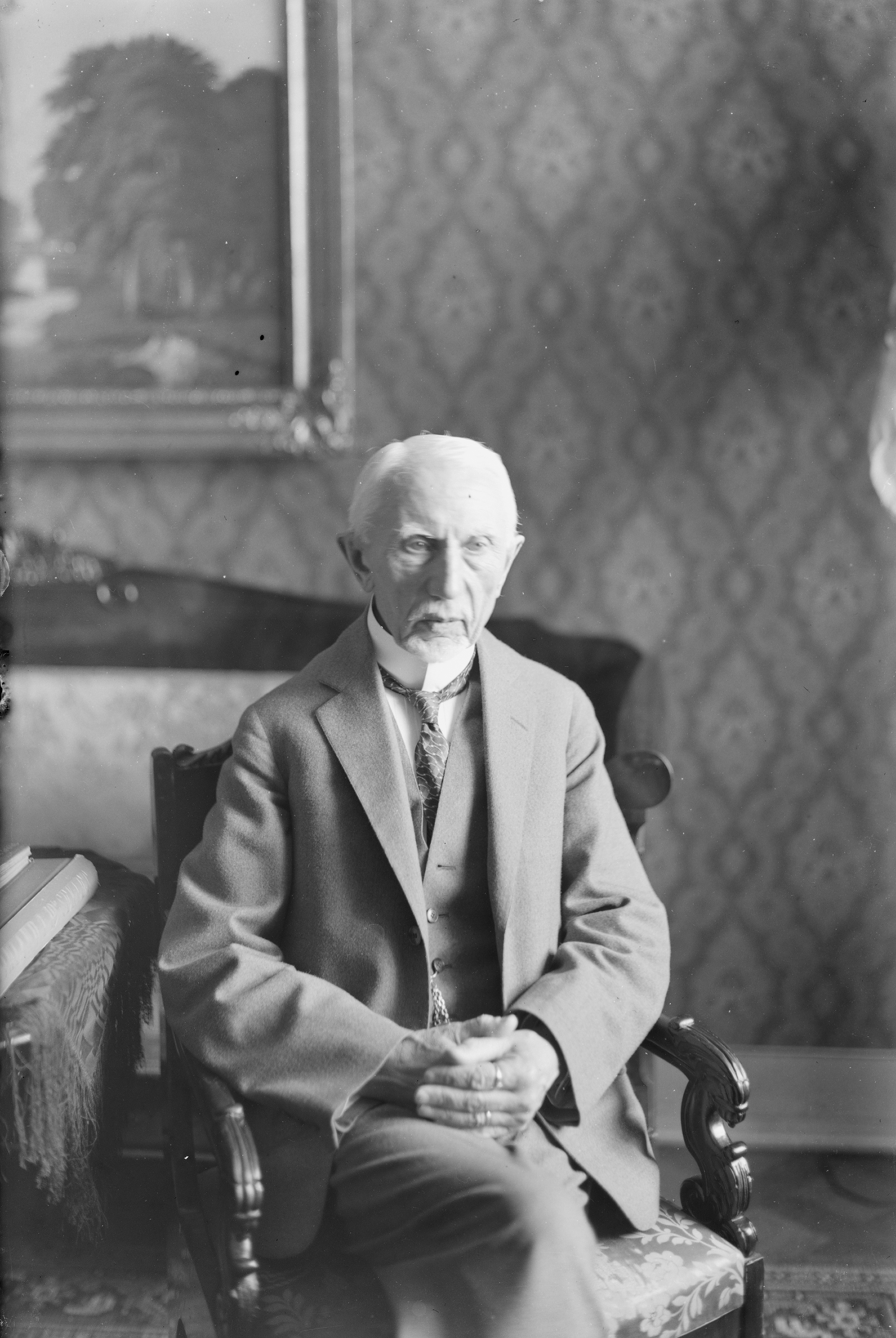
Söderholm in 1931

Karl Gustaf Söderholm (9 December 1859, in Loviisa – 17 June 1948) was a Finnish legal scholar and politician. He served as Minister of Justice from 27 November 1918 to 15 August 1919, from 15 March to 28 June 1920 and from 4 July 1930 to 21 March 1931. He was a member of the Diet of Finland from 1904 to 1906 and of the Parliament of Finland from 1907 to 1913 and again from 1916 to 1917, representing the Swedish People's Party of Finland (SFP). He served as the President of the Supreme Administrative Court of Finland from 1923 to 1929 and as the Chancellor of Åbo Akademi University from 1933 to 1941.
