= Viljami Kalliokoski =

Finnish politician

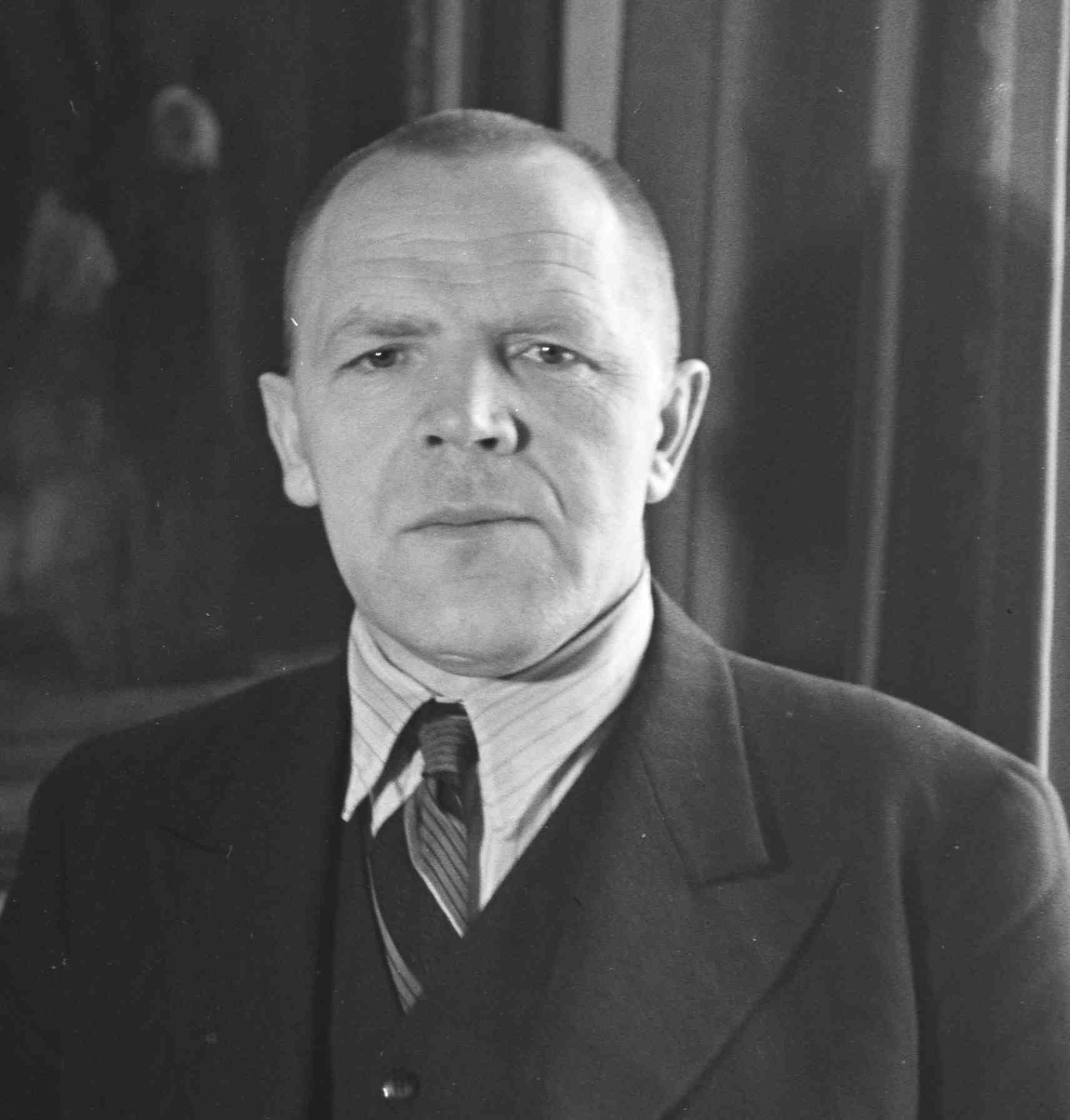

Viljami Kalliokoski (15 May 1894 in Halsua – 20 January 1978) was a Finnish farmer and politician. He was a member of the Agrarian League.

He served as Deputy Minister of Agriculture in Kyösti Kallio's fourth cabinet (7 October 1936 – 12 March 1937) and as Minister of Agriculture in Risto Ryti's second cabinet (15 August 1940 – 4 January 1941), in Jukka Rangell's cabinet (4 January 1941 – 5 March 1943), in Edwin Linkomies' cabinet (5 March 1943 – 8 August 1944), in Antti Hackzell's cabinet (8 August 1944 – 21 September 1944), in Urho Castrén's cabinet (21 September 1944 – 17 November 1944), in Ralf Törngren's cabinet (5 May 1954 – 20 October 1954) and in Urho Kekkonen's fifth cabinet (20 October 1954 – 3 March 1956) as well as a Member of Parliament (5 September 1922 – 5 April 1945 and 22 July 1948 – 19 February 1962).

In 1940–1945 he was the president of the Agrarian League.
