= Finnish Government =

Executive branch and cabinet of the government of Finland

- Finnish: Suomen valtioneuvosto Swedish: Finlands statsråd

Overview
- Established: 27 November 1917; 108 years ago
- State: Republic of Finland
- Leader: Prime Minister of Finland
- Appointed by: President of Finland
- Main organ: Prime Minister's Office
- Ministries: 12 (list)
- Responsible to: Parliament of Finland
- Annual budget: €90.1 billion (2025)
- Headquarters: Smolna (Note: The building is also known as the Government Banquet Hall. It is serving as temporary premises for the government) Eteläesplanadi 6
- Website: valtioneuvosto.fi

The Finnish Government (Finnish: Suomen valtioneuvosto; Swedish: Finlands statsråd; lit. 'Finland's council of state') is the executive branch and cabinet of Finland, which directs the politics of Finland and is the main source of legislation proposed to the Parliament. The Government has collective ministerial responsibility and represents Finland in the Council of the European Union. In the incumbent Orpo Cabinet, the Government comprises 19 ministers leading 12 ministries.

Majority coalition governments have become the foundation of the Finnish Government; apart from a few historical exceptions, a Government is usually assembled by the representatives of two major parties and a number of smaller parties.

== Composition ==
The Government is the most important executive body of Finland composed of the ministers. Its supreme powers are based on Section 3, Chapter 1 of the Constitution of Finland (and the subordinate Government Act of 2003):

The governmental powers are exercised by the President of the Republic and the Government, the members of which shall have the confidence of the Parliament.

=== Cabinet and ministers ===
The Government is led by the Prime Minister, considered practically the most powerful single office holder in Finland and often the leader of the largest political party.

The Government is composed of 11 ministries plus the Prime Minister's Office. Each ministry is led by at least one minister. Unlike the varying number and portfolios of ministers, the number and names of the ministries are fixed in law. All ministers sit in the Government.

The Government itself proposes the number of ministers and their roles for the Parliament of Finland to confirm, and it is possible to reshuffle portfolios during the life of a Government. There are no senior or junior ministers, and ministers without portfolio are no longer permitted under the 2000 constitution. Ministers are not required to be Members of Parliament (MPs), although they often are. Each minister is assisted by a secretary of state (Finnish: valtiosihteeri; Swedish: statssekreterare), a political appointee who serves at the pleasure of the minister.

Although ministers' portfolios are divided among the participating political parties, the Government has collective ministerial responsibility, and the ministers are expected to follow a government programme agreed upon during government formation talks.

=== List of the ministries ===
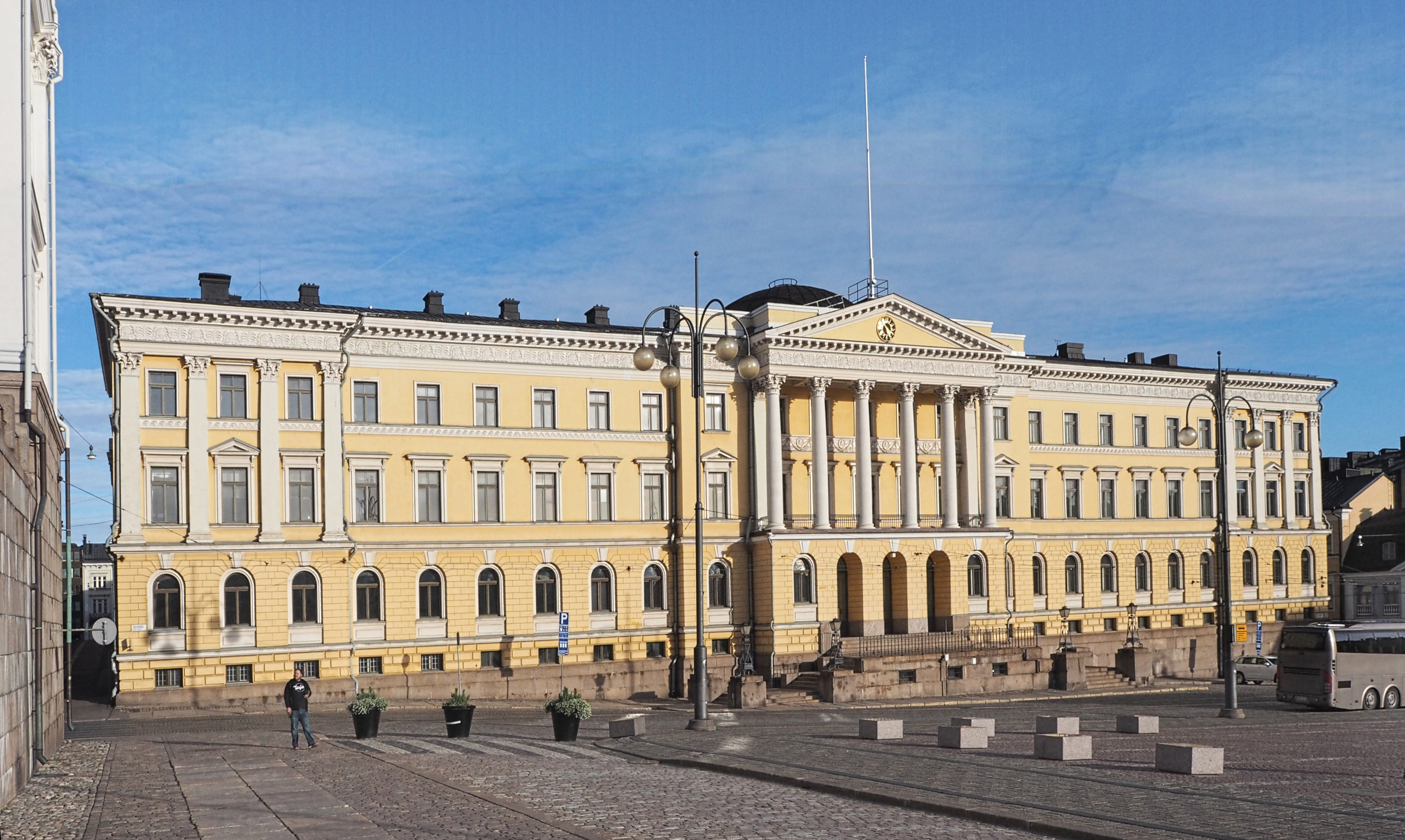
The Prime Minister's Office is located at the Government Palace near the Senate Square.

Ministry	Finnish name	Swedish name
Prime Minister's Office	valtioneuvoston kanslia	statsrådets kansli
Ministry for Foreign Affairs	ulkoministeriö	utrikesministeriet
Ministry of Justice	oikeusministeriö	justitieministeriet
Ministry of the Interior	sisäministeriö	inrikesministeriet
Ministry of Defence	puolustusministeriö	försvarsministeriet
Ministry of Finance	valtiovarainministeriö	finansministeriet
Ministry of Education and Culture	opetus- ja kulttuuriministeriö	undervisnings- och kulturministeriet
Ministry of Agriculture and Forestry	maa- ja metsätalousministeriö	jord- och skogsbruksministeriet
Ministry of Transport and Communications	liikenne- ja viestintäministeriö	kommunikationsministeriet
Ministry of Economic Affairs and Employment	työ- ja elinkeinoministeriö	arbets- och näringsministeriet
Ministry of Social Affairs and Health	sosiaali- ja terveysministeriö	social- och hälsovårdsministeriet
Ministry of the Environment	ympäristöministeriö	miljöministeriet

=== Ministerial committees ===
The Prime Minister may sit with a subset of the Government in a ministerial committee (cabinet committee), when it is not necessary or desirable to have the entire Government convene. There are government-specific and optional ministerial committees in addition to the four statutory ministerial committees:

- Ministerial Finance Committee (raha-asiainvaliokunta);
- Ministerial Committee on Foreign and Security Policy ((ulko- ja turvallisuuspoliittinen ministerivaliokunta) since 2000, before that Defence Council (puolustusneuvosto) since 1922);
- Ministerial Committee on Economic Policy (talouspoliittinen ministerivaliokunta; officially since 1977 and unofficially before that); and
- Ministerial Committee on European Union Affairs (Euroopan unionia koskevien asioiden ministerivaliokunta; established in 1995 to replace the Ministerial Committee on European Economic Community Affairs).

== Legislation ==
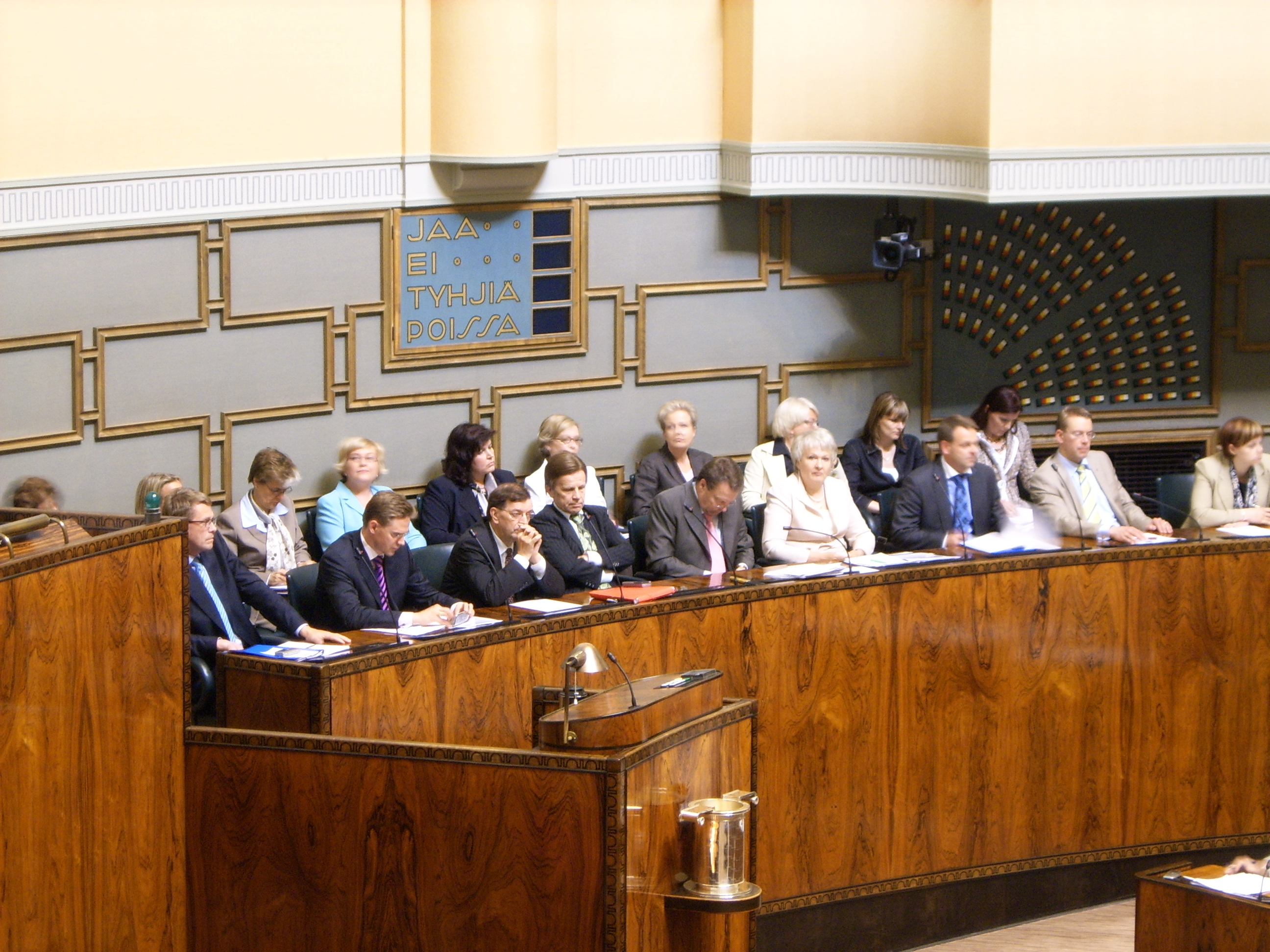
Vanhanen II Cabinet in a session of Finnish Parliament in 2007.

The Government initiates the majority of legislation. A proposed act (Finnish: laki; Swedish: lag) is drafted in the respective ministry under the direction of its minister, after which it is reviewed by the Government and forwarded as a government proposal (Finnish: hallituksen esitys; Swedish: regeringens proposition) to Parliament for processing and possible amendments. However, since coalition governments have become the norm in Finland, the parties represented in the Government usually form the majority in the parliament, making the process somewhat more harmonious. Since 1957, all governments have been majority governments. Before a proposal is enacted into law, it must be confirmed by the President of Finland. As such, the president has the power of a delaying veto as a check against majority politics and potential violations of international agreements. Periods of cohabitation, wherein the president and the government represent different political positions, can create strife. The president's veto can be overridden by the Parliament, although this is in practice not done. Parties can also agree not to vote along party lines but to leave the decision to individual MPs, although this is uncommon.

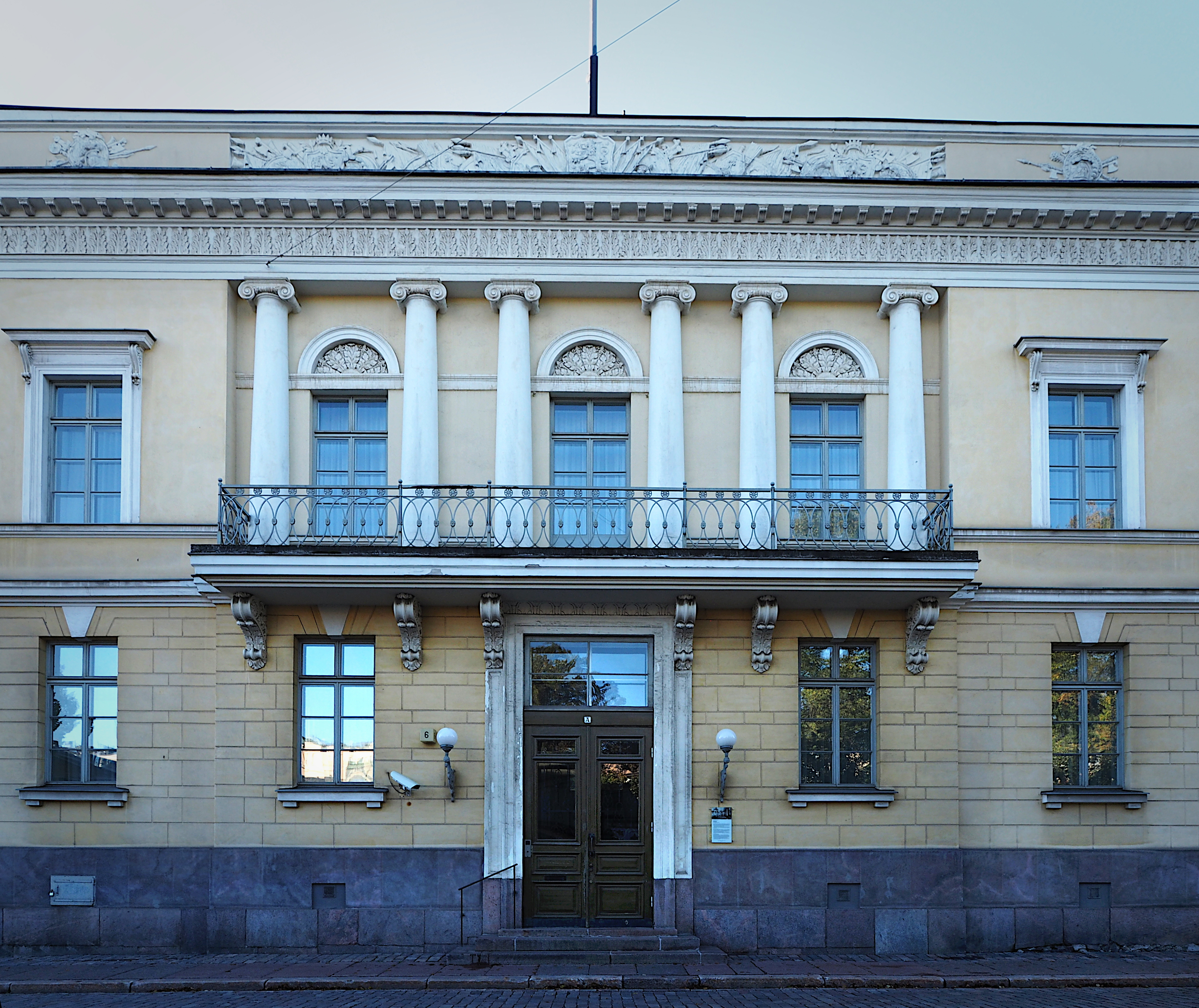
Smolna, located in Kaartinkaupunki, Helsinki, is used as a banquet hall of the Finnish Government.

While the Parliament passes acts, the Government or an individual ministry issues decrees (Finnish: asetus; Swedish: förordning) as delegated legislation. Decrees clarify, specify, and guide the implementation of an act of Parliament, but cannot contradict it. They are similar to US standing executive orders. A typical example is specifying the actual monetary sums for benefits described in general terms in an act. Decrees form an important body of law alongside acts of Parliament.

== Budget ==
State funds can be spent only in the framework of the state budget (Finnish: valtion talousarvio; Swedish: statsbudget), which must be confirmed by Parliament. The Government drafts the annual budget and introduces it to Parliament for discussion and approval. If the Government requires more funds mid-year, they have to submit an additional budget proposal to Parliament. For 2018, the central state budget was €55.8 billion, not including municipal budgets and non-departmental bodies like state-owned enterprises.

== Incumbent government ==
The current Orpo cabinet is Finland's 77th Government, which was inaugurated on 20 June 2023. Out of the total 19 ministerial posts, eight ministers are from the National Coalition Party, seven from the Finns Party, three from the Swedish People's Party of Finland, and one from the Christian Democrats (Finland).

The incumbent 19 ministers and their associated portfolios are listed below:

Portfolio	Minister	Took office	Left office	Party
Prime Minister	Petteri Orpo	20 June 2023	Incumbent	National Coalition
Minister deputising for the Prime Minister	Riikka Purra	20 June 2023	Incumbent	Finns
Minister of Finance	Riikka Purra	20 June 2023	Incumbent	Finns
Minister of Education	Anders Adlercreutz	5 July 2024	Incumbent	RKP
Minister of Agriculture and Forestry	Sari Essayah	20 June 2023	Incumbent	KD
Minister of Defence	Antti Häkkänen	20 June 2023	Incumbent	National Coalition
Minister for Development Cooperation and Foreign Trade	Ville Tavio	20 June 2023	Incumbent	Finns
Minister of Economic Affairs	Wille Rydman	6 July 2023	Incumbent	Finns
Minister of Employment	Arto Satonen	20 June 2023	Incumbent	National Coalition
Minister of the Environment and Climate Change	Kai Mykkänen	20 June 2023	Incumbent	National Coalition
Minister of European Affairs and Ownership Steering	Joakim Strand	5 July 2024	Incumbent	RKP
Minister for Foreign Affairs	Elina Valtonen	20 June 2023	Incumbent	National Coalition
Minister of the Interior	Mari Rantanen	20 June 2023	Incumbent	Finns
Minister of Justice	Leena Meri	20 June 2023	Incumbent	Finns
Minister of Local and Regional Government	Anna-Kaisa Ikonen	20 June 2023	Incumbent	National Coalition
Minister of Science and Culture	Sari Multala	20 June 2023	Incumbent	National Coalition
Minister of Social Affairs and Health	Kaisa Juuso	20 June 2023	Incumbent	Finns
Minister of Social Security	Sanni Grahn-Laasonen	20 June 2023	Incumbent	National Coalition
Minister of Transport and Communications	Lulu Ranne	20 June 2023	Incumbent	Finns
Minister of Youth, Sport and Physical Activity	Sandra Bergqvist	20 June 2023	Incumbent	RKP

== List of governments ==
The following is a list of all Finnish governments since 1917.

Government	Took office	Seats	Parties
Svinhufvud's senate	27 November 1917	103/200	Young Finnish Party; Swedish People's Party; Finnish Party; Agrarian League
Paasikivi's senate	27 May 1918	103/200	Young Finnish Party; Swedish People's Party; Finnish Party; Agrarian League
Ingman's cabinet	27 November 1918	77/200 77/108	National Coalition Party; Swedish People's Party; National Progressive Party
K. Castrén's cabinet	17 April 1919	90/200	Swedish People's Party; National Progressive Party; Agrarian League
Vennola's cabinet	15 August 1919	68/200	National Progressive Party; Agrarian League
Erich's cabinet	15 March 1920	118/200	National Progressive Party; Agrarian League; National Coalition Party; Swedish People's Party
Vennola's second cabinet	9 April 1921	68/200	National Progressive Party; Agrarian League
Cajander's cabinet	2 June 1922	–	–
Kallio's cabinet	14 November 1922	60/200	National Progressive Party; Agrarian League
Cajander's second cabinet	18 January 1924	–	–
Ingman's second cabinet	31 May 1924	122/200	National Progressive Party; Agrarian League; National Coalition Party; Swedish People's Party
Tulenheimo's cabinet	31 March 1925	82/200	Agrarian League; National Coalition Party
Kallio's second cabinet	31 December 1925	82/200	Agrarian League; National Coalition Party
Tanner's cabinet	13 December 1926	52/200	Social Democratic Party
Sunila's cabinet	17 December 1927	52/200	Agrarian League
Mantere's cabinet	22 December 1928	10/200	National Progressive Party
Kallio's third cabinet	16 August 1929	60/200	Agrarian League
Svinhufvud's second cabinet	4 July 1930	132/200	National Progressive Party; Agrarian League; National Coalition Party; Swedish People's Party
Sunila's second cabinet	21 March 1931	132/200	National Progressive Party; Agrarian League; National Coalition Party; Swedish People's Party
Kivimäki's cabinet	14 December 1932	85/200	National Progressive Party; Agrarian League; Swedish People's Party
Kallio's fourth cabinet	7 October 1936	60/200	National Progressive Party; Agrarian League
Cajander's third cabinet	3 March 1937	164/200	National Progressive Party; Agrarian League; Swedish People's Party; Social Democratic Party
Ryti's cabinet	1 December 1939	165/200	National Progressive Party; Agrarian League; Swedish People's Party; Social Democratic Party
Ryti's second cabinet	27 March 1940	190/200	National Progressive Party; Agrarian League; Swedish People's Party; Social Democratic Party; National Coalition Party
Rangell's cabinet	4 January 1941	198/200	National Progressive Party; Agrarian League; Swedish People's Party; Social Democratic Party; National Coalition Party; Patriotic People's Movement
Linkomies' cabinet	5 March 1943	190/200	National Progressive Party; Agrarian League; Swedish People's Party; Social Democratic Party; National Coalition Party
Hackzell's cabinet	8 September 1944	190/200	National Progressive Party; Agrarian League; Swedish People's Party; Social Democratic Party; National Coalition Party
U. Castrén's cabinet	21 October 1944	190/200	National Progressive Party; Agrarian League; Swedish People's Party; Social Democratic Party; National Coalition Party
Paasikivi's second cabinet	17 November 1944	165/200	National Progressive Party; Agrarian League; Swedish People's Party; Social Democratic Party; Finnish People's Democratic League
Paasikivi's third cabinet	17 April 1945	171/200	National Progressive Party; Agrarian League; Swedish People's Party; Social Democratic Party; Finnish People's Democratic League
Pekkala's cabinet	26 March 1946	162/200	Agrarian League; Swedish People's Party; Social Democratic Party; Finnish People's Democratic League
Fagerholm's cabinet	29 August 1948	54/200	Social Democratic Party
Kekkonen's cabinet	17 March 1950	75/200	National Progressive Party; Agrarian League; Swedish People's Party
Kekkonen's second cabinet	17 January 1951	129/200	National Progressive Party; Agrarian League; Swedish People's Party; Social Democratic Party
Kekkonen's third cabinet	20 October 1951	119/200	Agrarian League; Social Democratic Party; Swedish People's Party
Kekkonen's fourth cabinet	9 August 1953	66/200	Agrarian League; Swedish People's Party
Sakari Tuomioja's cabinet	17 November 1953	53/200	–
Törngren's cabinet	5 May 1954	120/200	Agrarian League; Swedish People's Party
Kekkonen's fifth cabinet	20 October 1954	107/200	Agrarian League; Social Democratic Party
Fagerholm's second cabinet	3 March 1956	120/200	Agrarian League; Social Democratic Party; Swedish People's Party
Sukselainen's cabinet	27 April 1957	79/200	Agrarian League; Swedish People'Party; Social Democratic Union of Workers and Smallholders; Finnish People's Party
von Fieandt's cabinet	29 November 1957	–	–
Kuuskoski's cabinet	26 April 1958	–	–
Fagerholm's third cabinet	29 September 1958	152/200	Social Democratic Party; Agrarian League; National Coalition Party; Finnish People's Party; Swedish People's Party
Sukselainen's second cabinet	13 January 1959	62/200	Agrarian League; Swedish People's Party
Miettunen's cabinet	14 August 1961	48/200	Agrarian League
Karjalainen's cabinet	13 April 1962	114/200	Agrarian League; Social Democratic Union of Workers and Smallholders; Swedish People's Party; National Coalition Party; Finnish People's Party
Lehto's cabinet	18 December 1963	–	–
Virolainen's cabinet	12 October 1964	112/200	Centre Party; National Coalition Party; Swedish People's Party; Finnish People's Party
Paasio's cabinet	27 May 1966	152/200	Finnish People's Democratic League; Social Democratic Party; Social Democratic Union of Workers and Smallholders; Centre Party
Koivisto's cabinet	22 March 1968	164/200	Social Democratic Party; Social Democratic Union of Workers and Smallholders; Centre Party; Swedish People's Party; Finnish People's Democratic League
Aura's cabinet	14 May 1970	–	–
Karjalainen's second cabinet	15 August 1970	144/200	Social Democratic Party; Centre Party; Swedish People's Party; Liberals
Aura's second cabinet	29 October 1971	–	–
Paasio's second cabinet	23 February 1972	55/200	Social Democratic Party
Sorsa's cabinet	4 October 1972	109/200	Centre Party; Swedish People's Party; Liberals; Social Democratic Party
Liinamaa's cabinet	13 June 1975	–	–
Miettunen's second cabinet	30 November 1975	152/200	Finnish People's Democratic League; Centre Party; Swedish People's Party; Liberals; Social Democratic Party
Miettunen's third cabinet	29 October 1976	58/200	Centre Party; Swedish People's Party; Liberals
Sorsa's second cabinet	15 May 1977	152/200	Finnish People's Democratic League; Swedish People's Party; Liberals; Social Democratic Party; Centre Party
Koivisto's second cabinet	26 May 1979	133/200	Finnish People's Democratic League; Swedish People's Party; Social Democratic Party; Centre Party
Sorsa's third cabinet	19 February 1982	133/200 102/200	Finnish People's Democratic League; Swedish People's Party; Social Democratic Party; Centre Party
Sorsa's fourth cabinet	6 May 1983	123/200	Swedish People's Party; Social Democratic Party; Centre Party; Finnish Rural Party
Holkeri's cabinet	30 April 1987	131/200	National Coalition Party; Social Democratic Party; Swedish People's Party; Finnish Rural Party
Aho's cabinet	26 April 1991	115/200	Centre Party; National Coalition Party; Swedish People's Party; Christian Democrats
Lipponen's cabinet	13 April 1995	145/200	National Coalition Party; Social Democratic Party; Swedish People's Party; Left Alliance; Green League
Lipponen's second Cabinet	15 April 1999	140/200 129/200	National Coalition Party; Social Democratic Party; Swedish People's Party; Left Alliance; Green League (−2002)
Jäätteenmäki's Cabinet	17 April 2003	117/200	Centre Party; Social Democratic Party; Swedish People's Party
Vanhanen's cabinet	24 June 2003	117/200	Centre Party; Social Democratic Party; Swedish People's Party
Vanhanen's second cabinet	19 April 2007	126/200	Centre Party; National Coalition Party; Green League; Swedish People's Party
Kiviniemi's cabinet	22 June 2010	126/200	Centre Party; National Coalition Party; Green League; Swedish People's Party
Katainen's cabinet	22 June 2011	124/200 112/200	National Coalition Party; Social Democratic Party; Left Alliance (−2014); Green League; Swedish People's Party; Christian Democrats
Stubb's cabinet	24 June 2014	112/200 102/200	National Coalition Party; Social Democratic Party; Green League (−2014); Swedish People's Party; Christian Democrats
Sipilä's cabinet	29 May 2015	124/200 105/200	Centre Party; Finns Party (−2017); National Coalition Party; Blue Reform (2017−)
Rinne's cabinet	6 June 2019	117/200	Social Democratic Party; Centre Party; Green League; Left Alliance; Swedish People's Party
Marin's Cabinet	10 December 2019	117/200	Social Democratic Party; Centre Party; Green League; Left Alliance; Swedish People's Party
Orpo Cabinet; Incumbent	20 June 2023	109/200	National Coalition Party; Finns Party; Swedish People's Party; Christian Democrats

== See also ==
- Politics of Finland
- Diet of Finland
- Finnish Civil War
