= Aaro Pakaslahti =

Finnish diplomat

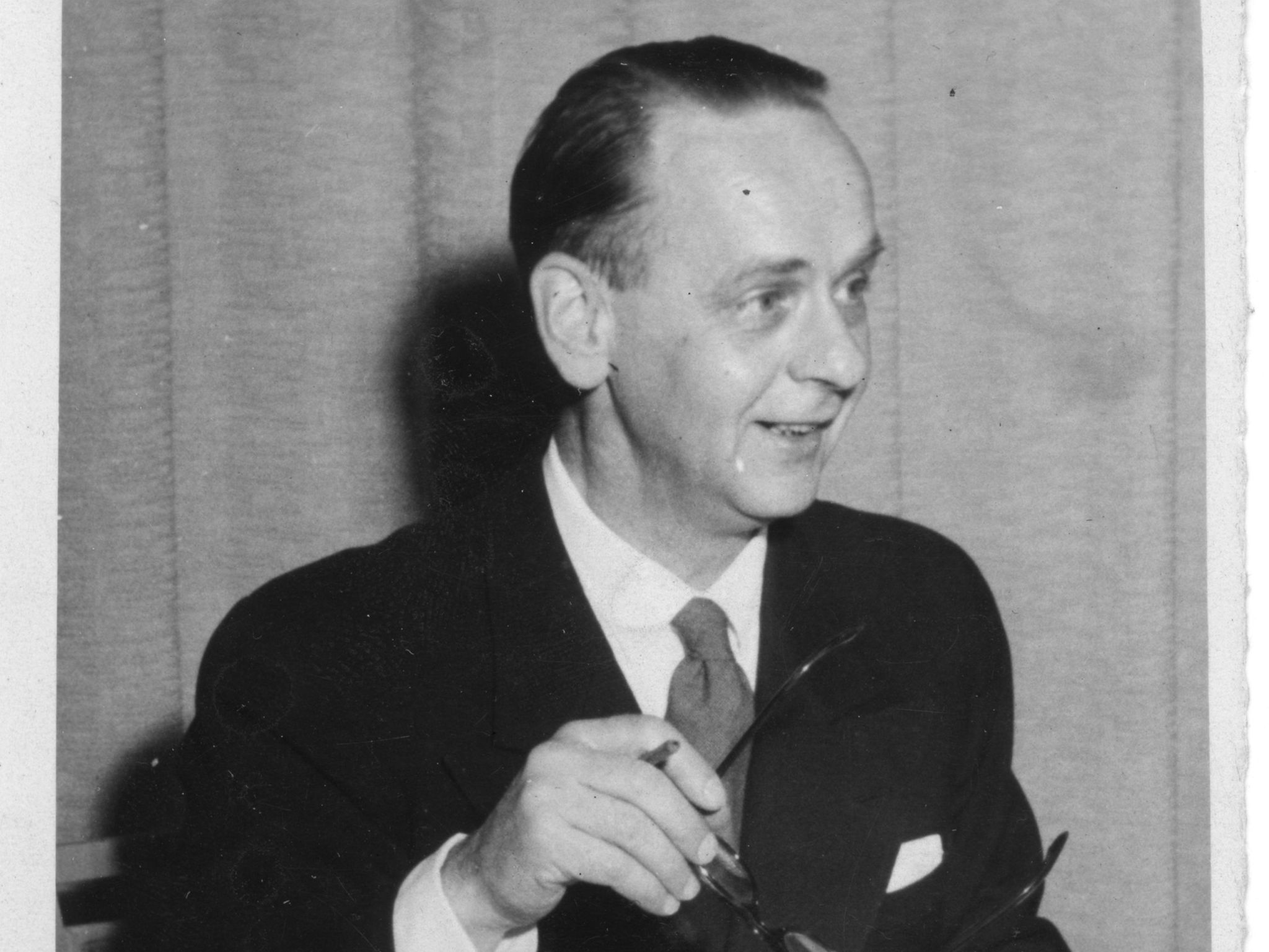
Aaro Pakaslahti in 1958.

Aaro Antti Pakaslahti (7 June 1903, Oulu – 20 May 1969, Madrid) was a Finnish diplomat, educated doctor of philosophy at Helsinki University. Johannes Pakaslahti is his son.

As a high school student of Oulu Lyceum, Aaro Pakaslahti attended as Member of the National Guard in the Battle of Oulu in February 1918 in the Finnish Civil War and later in the Tribal Wars in Aunus expedition in spring 1919, where he was wounded.

He served as the head of the Political Department of the Ministry of Foreign Affairs from 1939 to 1941 and served as Permanent Secretary in 1941–1943. After that, he was Finland's Envoy to Vichy France from 1943 to 1944.

After the end of the Continuation War and when the political turmoil changed, Pakaslahti first was set to non-active status and later detached from the Ministry of Foreign Affairs. President Urho Kekkonen later restored him as a diplomat.

Pakaslahti served as Ambassador to New Delhi between 1956 and 1959, and in Jakarta from 1958 to 1959 and Bangkok from 1958 to 1959, in Baghdad from 1959 to 1966, in Ankara from 1959 to 1966, as Envoy to Tehran from 1959 to 1965 (as Ambassador between 1965 and 1966) in Islamabad between 1959–1966 and in Madrid between1966–1969.
