= Johan Otto Söderhjelm =

Finnish jurist and politician (1898–1985)

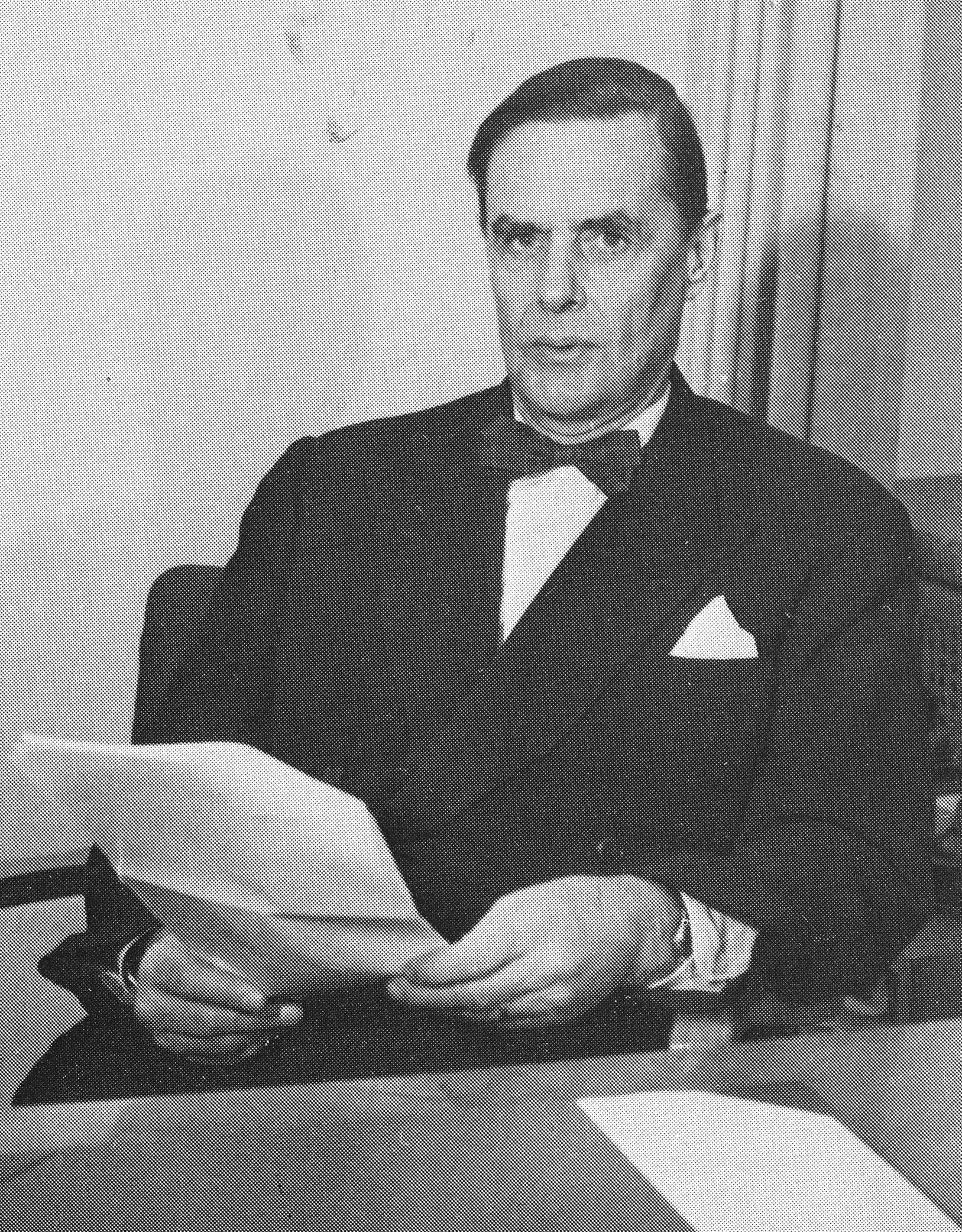
J.O. Söderhjelm

Johan Otto (J. O.) Söderhjelm (3 September 1898 – 28 February 1985) was a Finnish jurist and politician, born in Helsinki. He was a member of the Parliament of Finland from 1933 to 1939, from 1944 to 1951 and from 1962 to 1966, representing the Swedish People's Party of Finland. He served as Minister of Justice from 13 October 1939 to 27 March 1940, from 2 September to 29 November 1957, from 26 April to 29 August 1958, from 14 April 1962 to 18 December 1963 to and from 12 September 1964 to 1966 and as Deputy Minister of Finance from 21 September 1962 to 1 November 1963.
