= Albin Manner =

Finnish politician

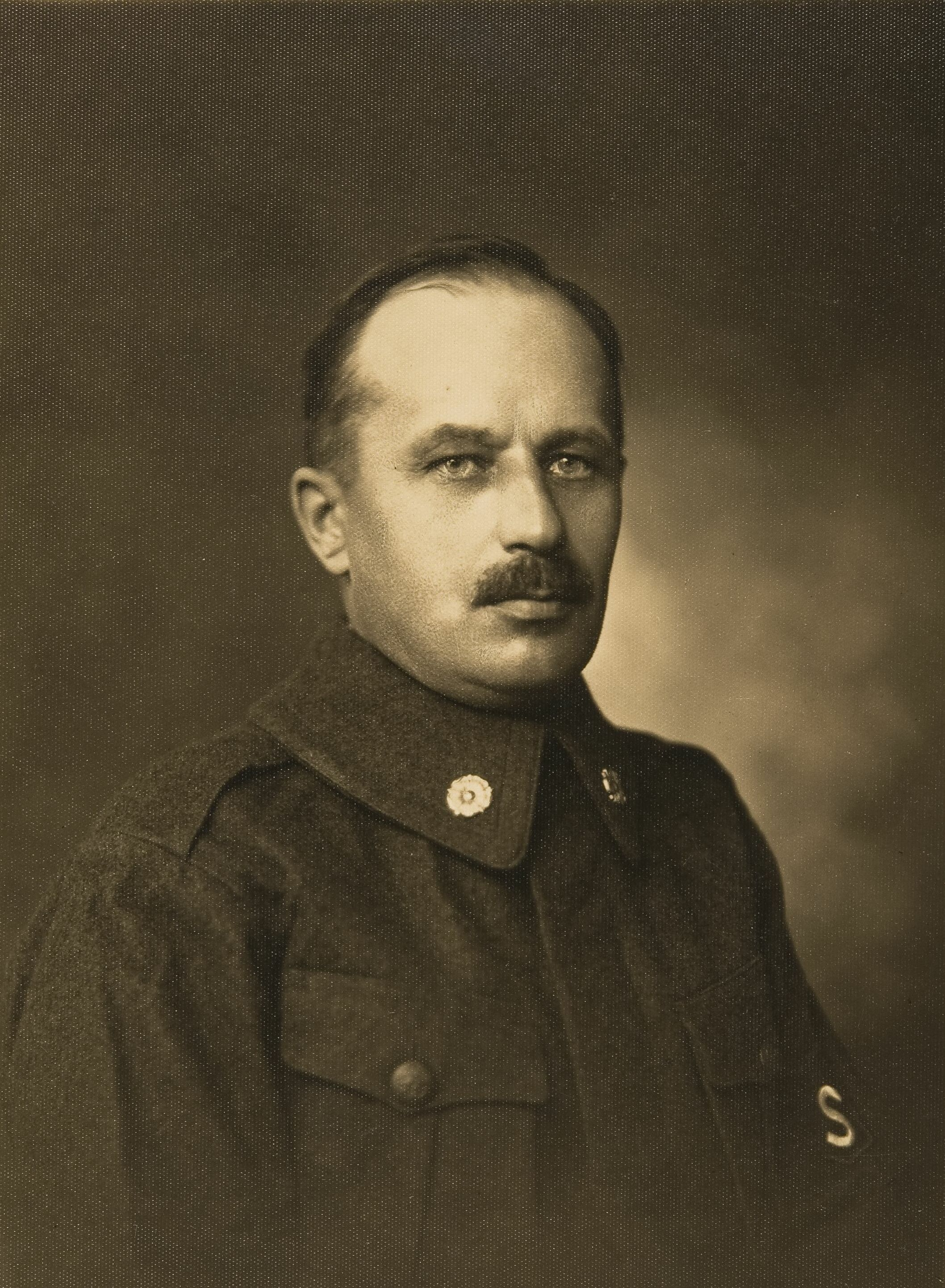
Albin Manner

Albin Vilho Manner (4 April 1888, Jääski – 8 July 1954) was a Finnish politician. He served as Deputy Minister of Defence from 4 to 10 July 1930 and as Minister of Defence from 10 July 1930 to 21 March 1931. He was a Member of the Parliament of Finland from 1917 to 1927 and again from 1929 to 1933, representing the Agrarian League.
