= Arvi Oksala =

Finnish engineer and politician (1891–1949)

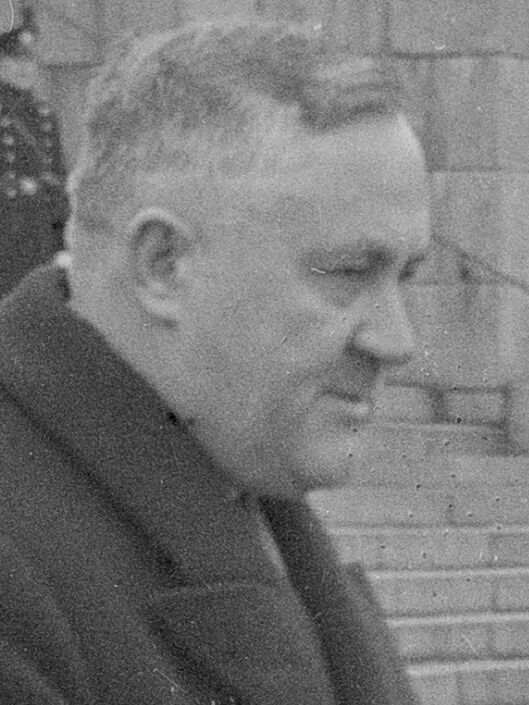
Arvi Oksala (1936)

Arvid (Arvi) Adiel Oksala (2 January 1891 – 23 July 1949; surname until 1906 Tapper) was a Finnish engineer and politician, born in Jyväskylä. He was a member of the Parliament of Finland from 1930 until his death in 1949, representing the National Coalition Party. He served as Minister of Defence from 14 December 1932 to 12 March 1937. He was a presidential elector in the 1937, 1940 and 1943 presidential elections.
