= Eino Tuomivaara =

Finnish agronomist and politician (1887–1975)

Eino Aarne Tuomivaara (13 February 1887, Säkkijärvi – 17 June 1975; surname until 1906 Hägglund) was a Finnish agronomist and politician. He served as Minister of Social Affairs from 4 July 1930 to 21 March 1931. He was a member of the Parliament of Finland, representing the Agrarian League from 1924 to 1930 and the Patriotic People's Movement (IKL) from 1933 to 1939 and again from 1941 to 1944 and finally, after the IKL was banned on 23 September 1944, as an independent from 1944 to 1945.
