= Leo Ehrnrooth =

Finnish politician (1877–1951)

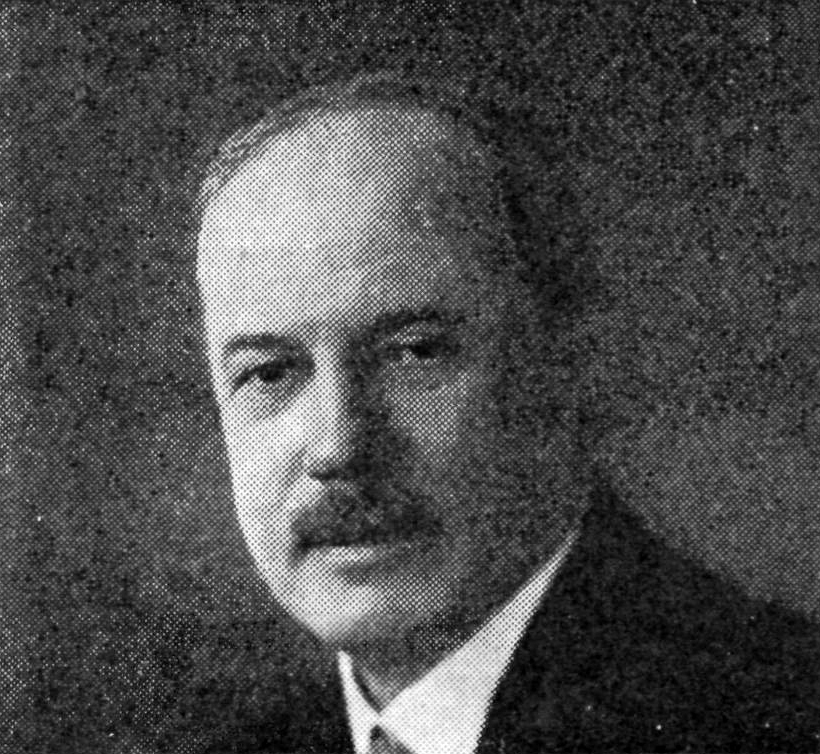
Leo Ehrnrooth, 1930s

Leo Reinhold Ehrnrooth (10 March 1877 in Helsinki – 26 July 1951 in Sweden) was a Finnish politician from Swedish People's Party of Finland.

He was a member of the Senate of Finland. He served as Minister of Trade and Industry in 1920, and as Minister of the Interior from March 1943 to August 1944.
