= Toivo Salmio =

Finnish cooperative organizer and politician (1882–1973)

Kaarlo Toivo Salmio (4 November 1882 – 16 July 1973; surname until 1906 Lindholm) was a Finnish cooperative organizer and politician, born in Jyväskylä. He was a member of the Social Democratic Party of Finland (SDP). He served as Minister of Trade and Industry from 23 August 1940 to 3 July 1941 and as Deputy Minister of People's Service from 3 October 1940 to 4 January 1941.
