= Eero A. Wuori =

Finnish journalist and politician

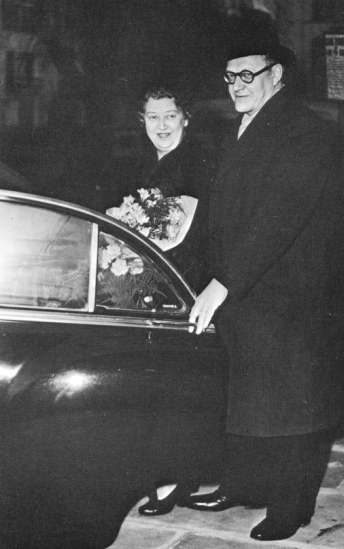
Eero A. Wuori with his wife Kerttu

Eero Aarne Wuori (surname until 1942 Vuori; 11 August 1900 – 12 September 1966) was a Finnish journalist and politician.

He was a minister of the Finnish Social Democratic Party. He had four ministerial portions in the Third Cabinet of Paasikivi he served as Minister at the Prime Minister's Office from 7 August 1945 to 19 September 1945, Minister of Transport and Public Works, 17 April 1945 to 19 September 1945, and Minister at the Ministry of Public Order and Minister at the Ministry of Social Affairs, 27 April 1945 to 19 September 1945.

Wuore was born in Helsinki. His parents were the carpenter Oskar Wuori and Josefina Kuntonen. His spouse since 1929 was Kerttu Juliana (née And (1903–1987), and they had one daughter. Eero Wuori had to go to Helsingin normaalilyseo with normal classes of seven classes until he was forced to suspend his schooling in 1918.

Prior to becoming a minister, Wuori was Chairman of Finnish Federation of Trade Unions, from 1938 to 1945. As chairman of the federation, Wuori played a key role in the so-called Betrothal of January.

After the ministry he left for diplomatic work and served as Representative in London 1945–1947 and Envoy 1947–1952 and as Ambassador in Moscow in 1955–1963 and in Stockholm 1964–1965 and as Head of the Political Department of the Ministry of Foreign Affairs. After returning from Stockholm, Wuori was still serving as the Permanent Secretary of the President's Office before his accidental death.

Wuori participated as a school boy on the red side of the Finnish Civil War in maintenance work and ended up in St. Petersburg, where he founded the Communist Party of Finland. Wuori worked for party duties in Finland and Sweden. He was caught and received a total of ten years' imprisonment for the war and his Communist actions, which he carried out in the prisons of Ekenäs and Turku. He was pardoned in 1925, when he had already departed from the communists. After release from imprisonment, Wuori worked as a reporter for Kansan Työ in 1926–1930 and as editor-in-chief in 1930–1938.

Wuori was one of the most prominent critics of Väinö Tanner in Social Democratic Party in 1944–1945

And at the end of the Continuation War, he mobilized the trade union movement to support peace negotiations with Soviet Union.

According to Professor Osmo Apunen and Professor Corinna Wolff's book, Pettureita ja patriootteja, published in 2009, Wuori acted in the crucial stages of the Continuation War in February–October 1944 as the "political agent" of the Soviet Union. He provided insider information about discussions with the government, parliament and the war headquarters for the Soviet Intelligence Service for NKGB

He died in Helsinki, aged 66.
