= Niilo Solja =

Finnish jurist and politician (1888–1967)

Niilo Johannes Solja (25 June 1888 – 15 September 1967; surname until 1907 Sandell) was a Finnish jurist and politician, born in Hämeenkyrö. He was a member of the Parliament of Finland from 1930 to 1933, representing the National Coalition Party. He served as Deputy Minister of the Interior from 21 March 1931 to 3 March 1932. He was a presidential elector in the 1937, 1940 and 1943 presidential elections.
