= Yrjö Puhakka =

Finnish jurist and politician (1888–1971)

Yrjö Wilhelm Puhakka (5 September 1888 – 28 February 1971) was a Finnish jurist and politician, born in Juuka. He was a member of the Parliament of Finland from 1927 to 1928 and from 1929 to 1930, representing the National Coalition Party. He served as Minister of the Interior from 14 December 1932 to 12 March 1937 and as Minister of Justice from 5 May to 20 October 1954.
