= Oskari Lehtonen =

Finnish politician

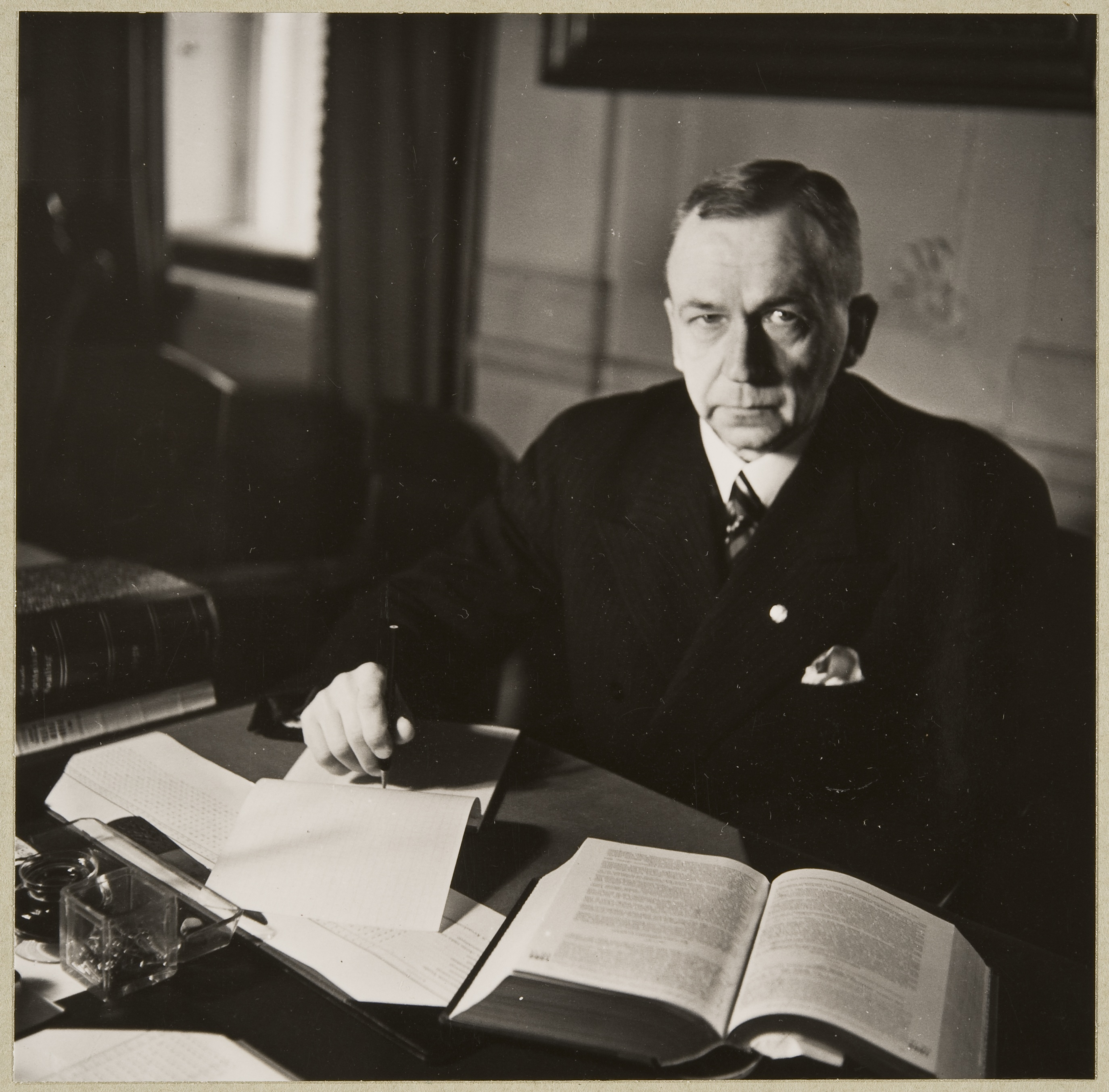
Oskari Lehtonen in 1942.

Oskari Lehtonen (29 May 1889, Hollola – 23 July 1964, Lahti) was a Finnish lawyer, bank director and politician. He served as Minister of Justice from 27 March 1940 to 8 August 1944. He was a member of the Parliament of Finland from 1927 to 1929, from 1930 to 1933, from 1936 to 1945, from 1948 to 1954 and from 1958 to 1962, representing the National Coalition Party.
