= Jalo Aura =

Finnish cooperative organizer and politician (1886–1947)

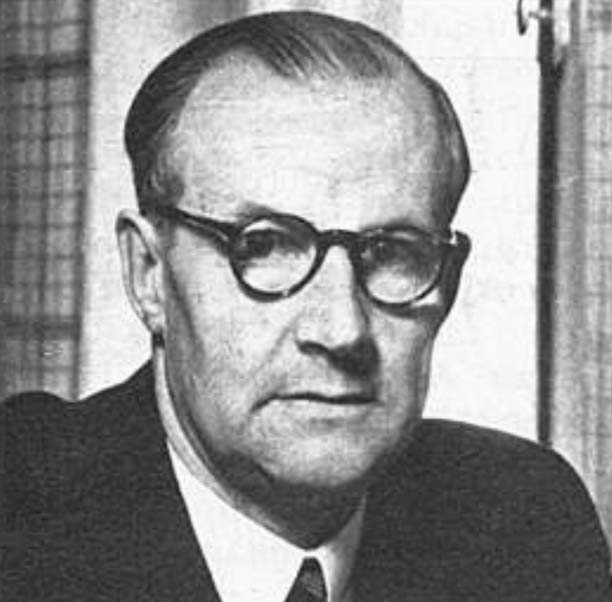
Jalo Aura

Jalo Aura (né Gröndahl; 20 August 1886 – 17 April 1947) was a Finnish cooperative organizer and politician, born in Kotka. He was a member of the Social Democratic Party of Finland (SDP). He served as Deputy Minister of People's Service from 5 March 1943 to 17 April 1945. He was the father of Teuvo Aura.
