= Kaarle Ellilä =

Finnish agronomist, farmer and politician (1888–1957)

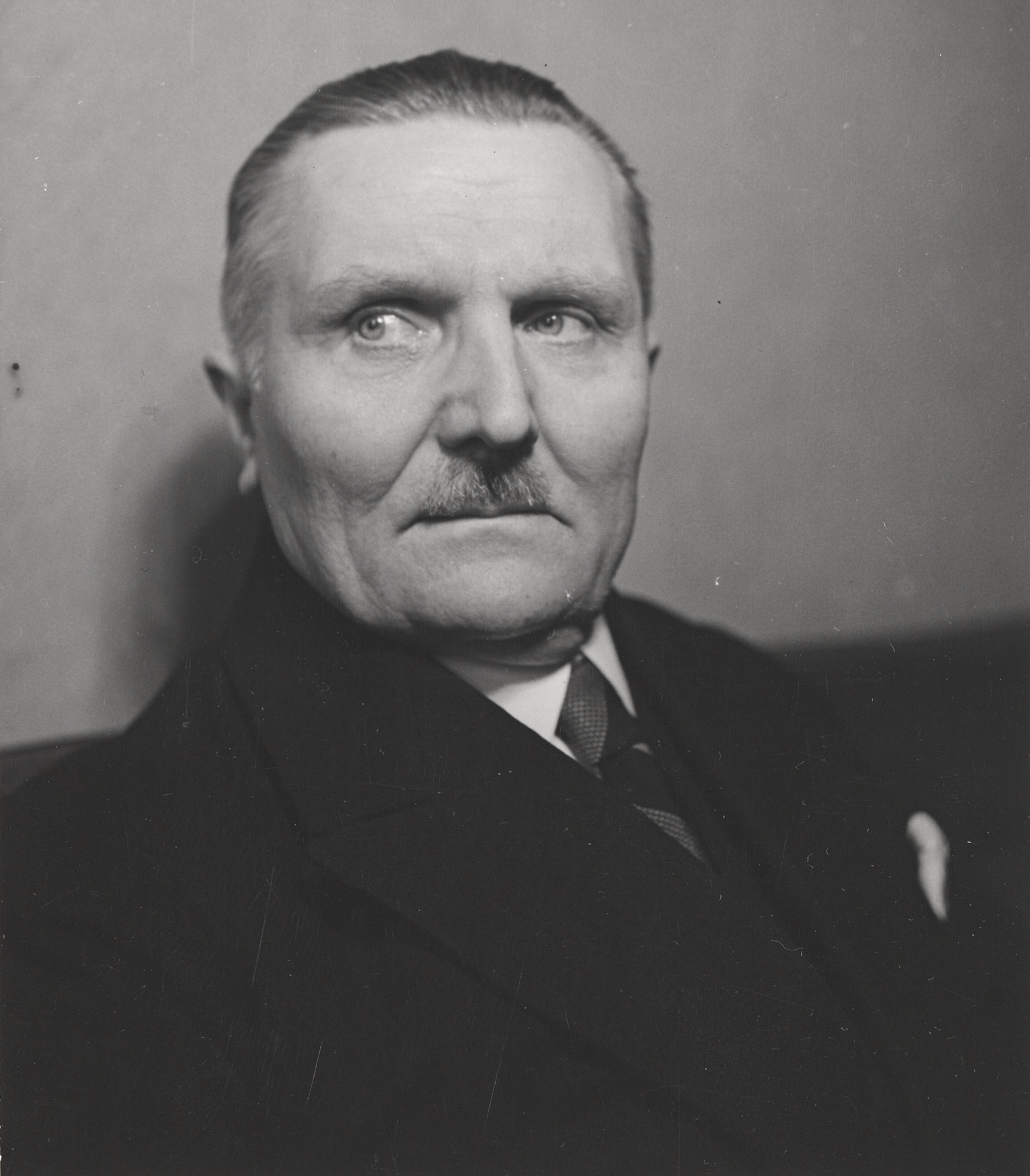
Kaarle Ellilä

Kaarle Johannes (K. J.) Ellilä (26 August 1888 – 6 October 1957) was a Finnish agronomist, farmer and politician, born in Karkku. He was a member of the Parliament of Finland from 1929 to 1930 and from 1932 to 1936, representing the Agrarian League. He served as Minister of Agriculture from 16 August 1929 to 4 July 1930 and Minister of People's Service from 5 March 1943 to 17 November 1944.
