= Kalle Kauppi (politician) =

Finnish politician

Kalle Kauppi

Kalle Kauppi (10 March 1892, in Heinolan maalaiskunta – 29 October 1961) was a Finnish legal scholar and politician. He served as Minister of Trade and Industry from 7 October 1936 to 12 March 1937, and Minister of Education from 5 March 1943 to 17 November 1944. He was a member of the Parliament of Finland from 1943 to 1951, representing the National Progressive Party.
