= Väinö Salovaara =

Finnish chief engineer and politician

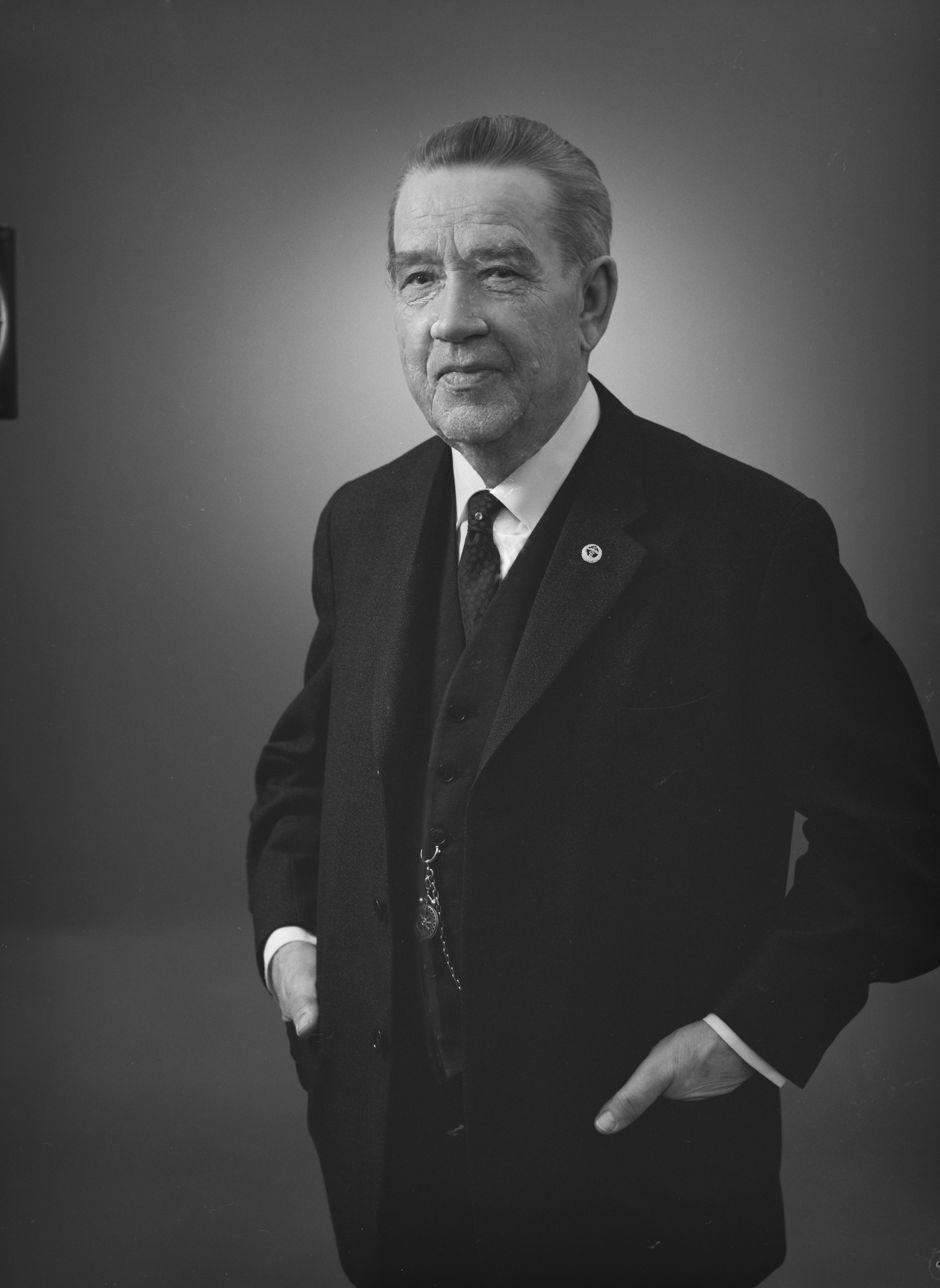
Väinö Salovaara

Väinö Veikko Salovaara (26 February 1888, Iitti – 29 October 1964), until 1906 Sillfors, was a Finnish chief engineer and politician. He served as Deputy Minister of Transport and Public Works from 12 March 1937 to 2 September 1939 and as Minister of Transport and Public Works from 2 September 1939 to 17 November 1944. He was a member of the Parliament of Finland from 1939 to 1945, representing the Social Democratic Party of Finland (SDP). He was the chairman of the SDP from 1942 to 1944.
