= Varsinais-Suomi (parliamentary electoral district) =

Electoral district of the Parliament of Finland

- Egentliga Finland
- Electoral District for the Parliament of Finland
- Location of Varsinais-Suomi within Finland
- Municipality: List: Aura; Kaarina; Kimitoön; Koski Tl; Kustavi; Laitila; Lieto; Loimaa; Marttila; Masku; Mynämäki; Naantali; Nousiainen; Oripää; Paimio; Pargas; Pöytyä; Pyhäranta; Raisio; Rusko; Salo; Sauvo; Somero; Taivassalo; Turku; Uusikaupunki; Vehmaa
- Region: Southwest Finland
- Population: 485,679 (2022)
- Electorate: 398,903 (2023)
- Area: 10,914 km^{2} (2022)

Current Electoral District
- Created: 1907
- Seats: List: 17 (1979–present); 16 (1954–1979); 17 (1951–1954); 14 (1948–1951); 15 (1939–1948); 16 (1917–1939); 17 (1907–1917)
- Members of Parliament: List: Pauli Aalto-Setälä (Kok); Li Andersson (Vas); Sandra Bergqvist (SFP); Ritva Elomaa (PS); Eeva-Johanna Eloranta (SDP); Timo Furuholm (Vas); Vilhelm Junnila (PS); Milla Lahdenperä (Kok); Aki Lindén (SDP); Mikko Lundén (PS); Saku Nikkanen (SDP); Petteri Orpo (Kok); Annika Saarikko (Kesk); Saara-Sofia Sirén (Kok); Ville Tavio (PS); Ville Valkonen (Kok); Sofia Virta (Vihr)

Varsinais-Suomi (Swedish: Egentliga Finland; also known as Finland Proper or Southwest Finland) is one of the 13 electoral districts of the Parliament of Finland, the national legislature of Finland. The district was established as Turku Province South (Finnish: Turun läänin eteläinen vaalipiiri; Swedish: Åbo läns södra valkrets) in 1907 when the Diet of Finland was replaced by the Parliament of Finland. It was renamed Varsinais-Suomi in 1997. It is conterminous with the region of Southwest Finland. The district currently elects 17 of the 200 members of the Parliament of Finland using the open party-list proportional representation electoral system. At the 2023 parliamentary election it had 398,903 registered electors.

== History ==
Turku and Pori Province South was one 16 electoral districts established by the Election Act of the Grand Duchy of Finland (Suomen Suuriruhtinaanmaan Vaalilaki) passed by the Diet of Finland in 1906. It consisted of the hundreds (kihlakunta) of Åland, Halikko, Masku, Mynämäki, Piikkiö and Vehmaa in the province of Turku and Pori. The Åland region was separated into its own electoral district in 1947. At the same time, the town of Loimaa and the municipalities of Alastaro, Loimaa, Mellilä and Metsämaa were transferred from Turku Province North to Turku Province South. Somero municipality was transferred from Häme South to Turku South in 1990. The district was renamed Varsinais-Suomi in 1997. Kodisjoki municipality was transferred from Varsinais-Suomi to Satakunta in 1998.

== Electoral system ==
Varsinais-Suomi currently elects 17 of the 200 members of the Parliament of Finland using the open party-list proportional representation electoral system. Parties may form electoral alliances with each other to pool their votes and increase their chances of winning seats. However, the number of candidates nominated by an electoral alliance may not exceed the maximum number of candidates that a single party may nominate. Seats are allocated using the D'Hondt method.

== Election results ==
=== Summary ===
Election	Left Alliance Vas / SKDL / STPV / SSTP			Green League Vihr			Social Democrats SDP / SDTP / SDP			Swedish People's SFP			Centre Kesk / ML			Liberals Lib / LKP / SK / KE / NP			National Coalition Kok / SP			Christian Democrats KD / SKL			Finns PS / SMP / SPP		
Election	Votes	%	Seats	Votes	%	Seats	Votes	%	Seats	Votes	%	Seats	Votes	%	Seats	Votes	%	Seats	Votes	%	Seats	Votes	%	Seats	Votes	%	Seats
2023	32,208	11.55%	2	19,411	6.96%	1	50,543	18.13%	3	13,785	4.94%	1	23,426	8.40%	1				64,179	23.02%	5	7,861	2.82%	0	55,705	19.98%	4
2019	35,481	12.84%	2	25,309	9.16%	1	49,156	17.78%	3	15,238	5.51%	1	29,796	10.78%	2				52,367	18.95%	4	5,121	1.85%	0	52,913	19.14%	4
2015	27,001	10.25%	2	22,875	8.68%	1	40,835	15.50%	3	13,111	4.98%	1	42,763	16.24%	3				55,355	21.02%	4	6,319	2.40%	0	50,813	19.29%	3
2011	25,025	9.63%	2	19,026	7.32%	1	50,922	19.60%	4	14,335	5.52%	1	30,113	11.59%	2				59,645	22.95%	4	7,540	2.90%	0	46,956	18.07%	3
2007	25,937	10.63%	2	22,868	9.37%	2	53,281	21.83%	4	13,369	5.48%	1	38,610	15.82%	3	297	0.12%	0	66,793	27.37%	5	11,377	4.66%	0	6,168	2.53%	0
2003	26,515	10.68%	2	21,250	8.56%	1	61,367	24.71%	4	13,081	5.27%	1	43,552	17.54%	3	399	0.16%	0	64,823	26.10%	5	9,597	3.86%	1	845	0.34%	0
1999	27,957	11.87%	2	18,194	7.73%	1	55,042	23.37%	4	11,891	5.05%	1	39,730	16.87%	3	259	0.11%	0	63,781	27.09%	5	5,436	2.31%	1	587	0.25%	0
1995	32,747	13.25%	2	14,388	5.82%	1	68,099	27.56%	5	11,163	4.52%	1	37,053	14.99%	3	492	0.20%	0	57,492	23.26%	5	4,585	1.86%	0	2,646	1.07%	0
1991	26,920	11.24%	2	11,401	4.76%	0	54,595	22.80%	4	12,631	5.27%	1	54,902	22.92%	4	843	0.35%	0	53,102	22.17%	4	4,704	1.96%	1	15,217	6.35%	1
1987	24,281	9.91%	2	6,406	2.62%	0	55,247	22.55%	4	15,608	6.37%	1	35,824	14.63%	2	1,048	0.43%	0	61,927	25.28%	5	4,378	1.79%	1	21,896	8.94%	1
1983	37,540	14.87%	3	5,420	2.15%	0	62,763	24.87%	5	13,444	5.33%	1	32,540	12.89%	2				58,952	23.36%	4	7,208	2.86%	0	34,459	13.65%	2
1979	47,863	19.46%	3				55,676	22.63%	4	11,024	4.48%	1	31,661	12.87%	2	12,114	4.92%	0	60,655	24.66%	5	10,081	4.10%	1	14,332	5.83%	1
1975	50,552	21.77%	4				50,013	21.54%	4	11,797	5.08%	1	31,545	13.58%	2	11,995	5.17%	1	50,429	21.72%	3	7,850	3.38%	1	7,934	3.42%	0
1972	44,454	20.44%	3				53,411	24.56%	4	12,118	5.57%	1	26,957	12.39%	2	13,218	6.08%	1	41,421	19.04%	3	4,761	2.19%	0	19,214	8.83%	2
1970	42,909	20.17%	4				47,190	22.19%	4	11,687	5.49%	1	29,826	14.02%	2	14,759	6.94%	1	40,208	18.90%	3	2,485	1.17%	0	20,470	9.62%	1
1966	48,820	24.24%	3				54,119	26.87%	5	12,646	6.28%	1	36,215	17.98%	3	19,055	9.46%	1	26,015	12.92%	2						
1962	48,973	24.94%	4				35,511	18.09%	3	13,166	6.71%	2	37,224	18.96%	3	24,158	12.30%	2	24,570	12.51%	2				3,151	1.60%	0
1958	41,908	25.78%	5				37,243	22.91%	4	11,330	6.97%	1	32,063	19.72%	3	16,514	10.16%	1	23,294	14.33%	2						
1954	42,027	24.47%	4				40,120	23.36%	4	13,518	7.87%	1	33,847	19.70%	3	22,082	12.85%	2	20,177	11.75%	2						
1951	38,453	24.36%	4				37,990	24.07%	4	12,932	8.19%	2	30,624	19.40%	3	15,550	9.85%	2	22,270	14.11%	2						
1948	37,910	25.34%	4				36,179	24.18%	4	13,796	9.22%	1	24,817	16.59%	2	12,587	8.41%	1	24,090	16.10%	2						
1945	39,201	27.98%	5				30,627	21.86%	3	20,536	14.66%	2	17,241	12.30%	2	12,422	8.87%	1	18,960	13.53%	2						
1939							42,243	40.49%	6	21,190	20.31%	3	11,800	11.31%	2	6,933	6.65%	1	13,865	13.29%	2						
1936							36,458	38.68%	7	20,511	21.76%	3	10,772	11.43%	2	8,160	8.66%	1	11,007	11.68%	2						
1933							30,682	34.78%	6	17,709	20.08%	3	12,087	13.70%	2	10,791	12.23%	2	16,091	18.24%	3						
1930	1,829	2.05%	0				28,399	31.81%	5	19,505	21.85%	3	13,085	14.66%	2	7,210	8.08%	2	17,920	20.07%	4						
1929	11,535	15.50%	2				16,192	21.76%	4	16,894	22.70%	4	10,853	14.58%	2	5,392	7.25%	1	12,188	16.38%	3						
1927	10,904	14.16%	2				16,891	21.93%	4	18,186	23.61%	4	9,393	12.20%	2	7,368	9.57%	1	14,219	18.46%	3						
1924	10,313	13.57%	2				17,321	22.79%	4	17,019	22.40%	4	7,767	10.22%	1	7,112	9.36%	1	16,409	21.59%	4						
1922	16,295	22.05%	4				11,971	16.20%	3	15,402	20.84%	3	6,692	9.05%	1	7,422	10.04%	1	16,085	21.76%	4						
1919							30,126	35.57%	6	19,136	22.59%	3	4,528	5.35%	0	11,411	13.47%	3	16,032	18.93%	3						
1917							35,218	39.61%	7	19,709	22.16%	4							29,634	33.33%	5						
1916							30,281	39.47%	7	18,348	23.92%	4				7,502	9.78%	1	16,573	21.60%	4						
1913							23,190	32.49%	6	19,319	27.07%	5				6,949	9.74%	2	17,822	24.97%	4						
1911							23,458	29.99%	5	21,005	26.86%	5				7,967	10.19%	1	20,991	26.84%	5						
1910							22,828	28.92%	5	21,425	27.14%	5				8,214	10.41%	1	21,769	27.58%	5						
1909							21,785	27.73%	5	20,408	25.97%	5				7,799	9.93%	2	22,714	28.91%	5						
1908							21,905	27.73%	5	20,855	26.40%	5				7,346	9.30%	1	22,928	29.03%	5						
1907							20,591	24.33%	4	22,598	26.70%	5				7,225	8.54%	1	27,443	32.42%	6						

(Figures in italics represent joint lists.)

=== Detailed ===
==== 2020s ====
===== 2023 =====
Results of the 2023 parliamentary election held on 2 April 2023:

Party		Party			Electoral Alliance		
Party		Votes	%	Seats	Votes	%	Seats
National Coalition Party	Kok	64,179	23.02%	5	64,179	23.02%	5
Finns Party	PS	55,705	19.98%	4	55,705	19.98%	4
Social Democratic Party of Finland	SDP	50,543	18.13%	3	50,543	18.13%	3
Left Alliance	Vas	32,208	11.55%	2	32,208	11.55%	2
Centre Party	Kesk	23,426	8.40%	1	23,426	8.40%	1
Green League	Vihr	19,411	6.96%	1	19,411	6.96%	1
Swedish People's Party of Finland	SFP	13,785	4.94%	1	13,785	4.94%	1
Christian Democrats	KD	7,861	2.82%	0	7,861	2.82%	0
Movement Now	Liik	6,538	2.35%	0	6,538	2.35%	0
Freedom Alliance	VL	2,176	0.78%	0	2,545	0.91%	0
Crystal Party	KRIP	369	0.13%	0	2,545	0.91%	0
Liberal Party – Freedom to Choose	Lib	1,215	0.44%	0	1,215	0.44%	0
Power Belongs to the People	VKK	566	0.20%	0	566	0.20%	0
Blue-and-Black Movement	SML	326	0.12%	0	326	0.12%	0
Animal Justice Party of Finland	EOP	308	0.11%	0	308	0.11%	0
Communist Party of Finland	SKP	109	0.04%	0	109	0.04%	0
Voitto Suominen (Independent)		47	0.02%	0	47	0.02%	0
Valid votes		278,772	100.00%	17	278,772	100.00%	17
Rejected votes		1,062	0.38%				
Total polled		279,834	70.15%				
Registered electors		398,903					

The following candidates were elected: Pauli Aalto-Setälä (Kok), 7,241 votes; Li Andersson (Vas), 18,007 votes; Sandra Bergqvist (SFP), 6,771 votes; Ritva Elomaa (PS), 6,805 votes; Timo Furuholm (Vas), 3,997 votes; Eeva-Johanna Eloranta (SDP), 8,496 votes; Vilhelm Junnila (PS), 8,303 votes; Milla Lahdenperä (Kok), 4,527 votes; Aki Lindén (SDP), 9,272 votes; Mikko Lundén (PS), 5,301 votes; Saku Nikkanen (SDP), 5,808 votes; Petteri Orpo (Kok), 17,432 votes; Annika Saarikko (Kesk), 8,572 votes; Saara-Sofia Sirén (Kok), 6,679 votes; Ville Tavio (PS), 15,071 votes; Ville Valkonen (Kok), 5,732 votes; and Sofia Virta (Vihr), 5,533 votes.

==== 2010s ====
===== 2019 =====
Results of the 2019 parliamentary election held on 14 April 2019:

Party		Party			Electoral Alliance		
Party		Votes	%	Seats	Votes	%	Seats
Finns Party	PS	52,913	19.14%	4	58,034	21.00%	4
Christian Democrats	KD	5,121	1.85%	0	58,034	21.00%	4
National Coalition Party	Kok	52,367	18.95%	4	52,367	18.95%	4
Social Democratic Party of Finland	SDP	49,156	17.78%	3	49,156	17.78%	3
Left Alliance	Vas	35,481	12.84%	2	35,481	12.84%	2
Centre Party	Kesk	29,796	10.78%	2	29,796	10.78%	2
Green League	Vihr	25,309	9.16%	1	25,309	9.16%	1
Swedish People's Party of Finland	SFP	15,238	5.51%	1	15,238	5.51%	1
Movement Now	Liik	5,322	1.93%	0	5,322	1.93%	0
Pirate Party	Pir	1,244	0.45%	0	1,658	0.60%	0
Liberal Party – Freedom to Choose	Lib	414	0.15%	0	1,658	0.60%	0
Blue Reform	SIN	1,427	0.52%	0	1,427	0.52%	0
Animal Justice Party of Finland	EOP	610	0.22%	0	610	0.22%	0
Seven Star Movement	TL	451	0.16%	0	451	0.16%	0
Independence Party	IPU	442	0.16%	0	442	0.16%	0
Communist Party of Finland	SKP	292	0.11%	0	292	0.11%	0
Finnish People First	SKE	213	0.08%	0	213	0.08%	0
Feminist Party	FP	198	0.07%	0	198	0.07%	0
Kari Leppäjoki (Independent)		166	0.06%	0	166	0.06%	0
Petri Paakki (Independent)		145	0.05%	0	145	0.05%	0
Communist Workers' Party – For Peace and Socialism	KTP	96	0.03%	0	96	0.03%	0
Valid votes		276,401	100.00%	17	276,401	100.00%	17
Rejected votes		1,199	0.43%				
Total polled		277,600	70.42%				
Registered electors		394,180					

The following candidates were elected: Li Andersson (Vas), 24,542 votes; Sandra Bergqvist (SFP), 2,983 votes; Ritva Elomaa (PS), 7,688 votes; Eeva-Johanna Eloranta (SDP), 7,358 votes; Vilhelm Junnila (PS), 10,788 votes; Ilkka Kanerva (Kok), 7,350 votes; Esko Kiviranta (Kesk), 3,828 votes; Aki Lindén (SDP), 8,970 votes; Mikko Lundén (PS), 4,500 votes; Petteri Orpo (Kok), 10,792 votes; Annika Saarikko (Kesk), 9,390 votes; Saara-Sofia Sirén (Kok), 4,553 votes; Katja Taimela (SDP), 5,736 votes; Ville Tavio (PS), 14,957 votes; Anne-Mari Virolainen (Kok), 7,218 votes; Sofia Virta (Vihr), 4,289 votes; and Johannes Yrttiaho (Vas), 2,636 votes.

===== 2015 =====
Results of the 2015 parliamentary election held on 19 April 2015:

Party		Party			Electoral Alliance		
Party		Votes	%	Seats	Votes	%	Seats
National Coalition Party	Kok	55,355	21.02%	4	68,466	25.99%	5
Swedish People's Party of Finland	SFP	13,111	4.98%	1	68,466	25.99%	5
True Finns	PS	50,813	19.29%	3	50,813	19.29%	3
Centre Party	Kesk	42,763	16.24%	3	42,763	16.24%	3
Social Democratic Party of Finland	SDP	40,835	15.50%	3	40,835	15.50%	3
Left Alliance	Vas	27,001	10.25%	2	27,001	10.25%	2
Green League	Vihr	22,875	8.68%	1	22,875	8.68%	1
Christian Democrats	KD	6,319	2.40%	0	6,319	2.40%	0
Pirate Party	Pir	2,008	0.76%	0	2,008	0.76%	0
Independence Party	IPU	963	0.37%	0	963	0.37%	0
Communist Party of Finland	SKP	664	0.25%	0	727	0.28%	0
Communist Workers' Party – For Peace and Socialism	KTP	63	0.02%	0	727	0.28%	0
Kari Leppäjoki (Independent)		268	0.10%	0	268	0.10%	0
Workers' Party of Finland	STP	184	0.07%	0	184	0.07%	0
Change 2011		172	0.07%	0	172	0.07%	0
Valid votes		263,394	100.00%	17	263,394	100.00%	17
Rejected votes		1,203	0.45%				
Total polled		264,597	68.28%				
Registered electors		387,499					

The following candidates were elected: Olavi Ala-Nissilä (Kesk), 4,908 votes; Li Andersson (Vas), 15,071 votes; Ritva Elomaa (PS), 9,571 votes; 9,571 votes; Eeva-Johanna Eloranta (SDP), 6,689 votes; Ilkka Kanerva (Kok), 9,183 votes; Ilkka Kantola (SDP), 5,908 votes; Esko Kiviranta (Kesk), 5,994 votes; Annika Lapintie (Vas), 5,027 votes; Maria Lohela (PS), 5,583 votes; Ville Niinistö (Vihr), 8,835 votes; Petteri Orpo (Kok), 10,652 votes; Annika Saarikko (Kesk), 10,510 votes; Saara-Sofia Sirén (Kok), 4,625 votes; Katja Taimela (SDP), 6,017 votes; Ville Tavio (PS), 6,847 votes; Anne-Mari Virolainen (Kok), 7,169 votes; and Stefan Wallin (SFP), 9,787 votes.

===== 2011 =====
Results of the 2011 parliamentary election held on 17 April 2011:

Party		Party			Electoral Alliance		
Party		Votes	%	Seats	Votes	%	Seats
National Coalition Party	Kok	59,645	22.95%	4	59,645	22.95%	4
Social Democratic Party of Finland	SDP	50,922	19.60%	4	50,922	19.60%	4
True Finns	PS	46,956	18.07%	3	46,956	18.07%	3
Centre Party	Kesk	30,113	11.59%	2	44,448	17.10%	3
Swedish People's Party of Finland	SFP	14,335	5.52%	1	44,448	17.10%	3
Left Alliance	Vas	25,025	9.63%	2	25,025	9.63%	2
Green League	Vihr	19,026	7.32%	1	19,026	7.32%	1
Christian Democrats	KD	7,540	2.90%	0	7,540	2.90%	0
Pirate Party	Pir	1,664	0.64%	0	1,664	0.64%	0
Freedom Party – Finland's Future	VP	1,599	0.62%	0	1,599	0.62%	0
Change 2011		1,339	0.52%	0	1,339	0.52%	0
Communist Party of Finland	SKP	872	0.34%	0	951	0.37%	0
Communist Workers' Party – For Peace and Socialism	KTP	79	0.03%	0	951	0.37%	0
Independence Party	IPU	272	0.10%	0	272	0.10%	0
Non-Affiliated Joint List		162	0.06%	0	162	0.06%	0
Workers' Party of Finland	STP	157	0.06%	0	157	0.06%	0
Senior Citizens' Party		150	0.06%	0	150	0.06%	0
Valid votes		259,856	100.00%	17	259,856	100.00%	17
Rejected votes		1,302	0.50%				
Total polled		261,158	68.68%				
Registered electors		380,259					

The following candidates were elected: Ritva Elomaa (PS), 13,121 votes; Eeva-Johanna Eloranta (SDP), 3,648 votes; Lauri Heikkilä (PS), 6,199 votes; Pertti Hemmilä (Kok), 6,413 votes; Ilkka Kanerva (Kok), 7,820 votes; Ilkka Kantola (SDP), 6,339 votes; Esko Kiviranta (Kesk), 6,035 votes; Annika Lapintie (Vas), 7,723 votes; Maria Lohela (PS), 4,873 votes; Ville Niinistö (Vihr), 5,362 votes; Petteri Orpo (Kok), 11,018 votes; Heli Paasio (SDP), 13,958 votes; Annika Saarikko (Kesk), 4,185 votes; Katja Taimela (SDP), 8,498 votes; Anne-Mari Virolainen (Kok), 10,041 votes; Stefan Wallin (SFP), 12,366 votes; and Jyrki Yrttiaho (Vas), 4,634 votes.

==== 2000s ====
===== 2007 =====
Results of the 2007 parliamentary election held on 18 March 2007:

Party		Party			Electoral Alliance		
Party		Votes	%	Seats	Votes	%	Seats
National Coalition Party	Kok	66,793	27.37%	5	66,793	27.37%	5
Social Democratic Party of Finland	SDP	53,281	21.83%	4	53,281	21.83%	4
Centre Party	Kesk	38,610	15.82%	3	51,979	21.30%	4
Swedish People's Party of Finland	SFP	13,369	5.48%	1	51,979	21.30%	4
Left Alliance	Vas	25,937	10.63%	2	25,937	10.63%	2
Green League	Vihr	22,868	9.37%	2	22,868	9.37%	2
Christian Democrats	KD	11,377	4.66%	0	11,377	4.66%	0
True Finns	PS	6,168	2.53%	0	6,168	2.53%	0
Finnish People's Blue-Whites	SKS	3,074	1.26%	0	3,074	1.26%	0
Communist Party of Finland	SKP	916	0.38%	0	916	0.38%	0
Non-Affiliated Joint List		499	0.20%	0	499	0.20%	0
Liberals	Lib	297	0.12%	0	297	0.12%	0
Independence Party	IPU	262	0.11%	0	262	0.11%	0
Pensioners for People		258	0.11%	0	258	0.11%	0
Communist Workers' Party – For Peace and Socialism	KTP	135	0.06%	0	135	0.06%	0
Patriotic People's Movement	IKL	112	0.05%	0	112	0.05%	0
Workers' Party of Finland	STP	109	0.04%	0	109	0.04%	0
Valid votes		244,065	100.00%	17	244,065	100.00%	17
Rejected votes		1,506	0.61%				
Total polled		245,571	65.84%				
Registered electors		372,966					

The following candidates were elected: Janina Andersson (Vihr), 5,587 votes; Pertti Hemmilä (Kok), 6,188 votes; Liisa Hyssälä (Kesk), 6,152 votes; Ilkka Kanerva (Kok), 11,079 votes; Ilkka Kantola (SDP), 5,091 votes; Timo Kaunisto (Kesk), 7,213 votes; Esko Kiviranta (Kesk), 6,210 votes; Marjaana Koskinen (SDP), 7,649 votes; Annika Lapintie (Vas), 5,575 votes; Jouko Laxell (Kok), 5,056 votes; Ville Niinistö (Vihr), 5,182 votes; Petteri Orpo (Kok), 6,069 votes; Heli Paasio (SDP), 11,233 votes; Katja Taimela (SDP), 5,984 votes; Anne-Mari Virolainen (Kok), 6,812 votes; Stefan Wallin (SFP), 12,097 votes; and Jyrki Yrttiaho (Vas), 4,492 votes.

===== 2003 =====
Results of the 2003 parliamentary election held on 16 March 2003:

Party		Party			Electoral Alliance		
Party		Votes	%	Seats	Votes	%	Seats
National Coalition Party	Kok	64,823	26.10%	5	74,420	29.96%	6
Christian Democrats	KD	9,597	3.86%	1	74,420	29.96%	6
Social Democratic Party of Finland	SDP	61,367	24.71%	4	61,367	24.71%	4
Centre Party	Kesk	43,552	17.54%	3	43,552	17.54%	3
Left Alliance	Vas	26,515	10.68%	2	26,515	10.68%	2
Green League	Vihr	21,250	8.56%	1	21,250	8.56%	1
Swedish People's Party of Finland	SFP	13,081	5.27%	1	13,081	5.27%	1
Finnish People's Blue-Whites	SKS	3,929	1.58%	0	3,929	1.58%	0
Communist Party of Finland	SKP	1,615	0.65%	0	1,615	0.65%	0
True Finns	PS	845	0.34%	0	1,244	0.50%	0
Liberals	Lib	399	0.16%	0	1,244	0.50%	0
Forces for Change in Finland		945	0.38%	0	945	0.38%	0
Communist Workers' Party – For Peace and Socialism	KTP	313	0.13%	0	313	0.13%	0
Julius Karlsson (Independent)		138	0.06%	0	138	0.06%	0
Valid votes		248,369	100.00%	17	248,369	100.00%	17
Rejected votes		1,995	0.80%				
Total polled		250,364	68.45%				
Registered electors		365,760					

The following candidates were elected: Olavi Ala-Nissilä (Kesk), 7,381 votes; Janina Andersson (Vihr), 6,625 votes; Jan-Erik Enestam (SFP), 6,450 votes; Sari Essayah (KD), 9,597 votes; Pertti Hemmilä (Kok), 6,473 votes; Liisa Hyssälä (Kesk), 8,869 votes; Mikko Immonen (Vas), 3,939 votes; Ville Itälä (Kok), 21,422 votes; Ilkka Kanerva (Kok), 7,203 votes; Marjukka Karttunen (Kok), 4,377 votes; Esko Kiviranta (Kesk), 6,758 votes; Marjaana Koskinen (SDP), 9,367 votes; Annika Lapintie (Vas), 6,743 votes; Heli Paasio (SDP), 12,651 votes; Maija Perho (Kok), 4,991 votes; Virpa Puisto (SDP), 7,485 votes; and Jukka Roos (SDP), 6,088 votes.

==== 1990s ====
===== 1999 =====
Results of the 1999 parliamentary election held on 21 March 1999:

Party		Party			Electoral Alliance		
Party		Votes	%	Seats	Votes	%	Seats
National Coalition Party	Kok	63,781	27.09%	5	63,781	27.09%	5
Centre Party	Kesk	39,730	16.87%	3	57,057	24.23%	5
Swedish People's Party of Finland	SFP	11,891	5.05%	1	57,057	24.23%	5
Finnish Christian League	SKL	5,436	2.31%	1	57,057	24.23%	5
Social Democratic Party of Finland	SDP	55,042	23.37%	4	55,042	23.37%	4
Left Alliance	Vas	27,957	11.87%	2	27,957	11.87%	2
Green League	Vihr	18,194	7.73%	1	18,194	7.73%	1
National Front	KR	4,853	2.06%	0	4,853	2.06%	0
Young Finns	Nuors	1,811	0.77%	0	3,084	1.31%	0
Reform Group	Rem	1,014	0.43%	0	3,084	1.31%	0
Liberal People's Party	LKP	259	0.11%	0	3,084	1.31%	0
Communist Party of Finland	SKP	1,643	0.70%	0	2,354	1.00%	0
Kirjava ”Puolue” – Elonkehän Puolesta	KIPU	498	0.21%	0	2,354	1.00%	0
Communist Workers' Party – For Peace and Socialism	KTP	213	0.09%	0	2,354	1.00%	0
Pensioners for People	EKA	784	0.33%	0	1,862	0.79%	0
True Finns	PS	587	0.25%	0	1,862	0.79%	0
Alliance for Free Finland	VSL	491	0.21%	0	1,862	0.79%	0
Finland: Non-EU Joint List		651	0.28%	0	651	0.28%	0
Natural Law Party	LLP	499	0.21%	0	499	0.21%	0
Kankaanpää Ismo (Independent)		142	0.06%	0	142	0.06%	0
Valid votes		235,476	100.00%	17	235,476	100.00%	17
Rejected votes		2,467	1.04%				
Total polled		237,943	66.36%				
Registered electors		358,554					

The following candidates were elected: Olavi Ala-Nissilä (Kesk), 6,895 votes; Janina Andersson (Vihr), 9,172 votes; Jan-Erik Enestam (SFP), 9,010 votes; Pertti Hemmilä (Kok), 6,190 votes; Liisa Hyssälä (Kesk), 7,111 votes; Mikko Immonen (Vas), 4,463 votes; Ville Itälä (Kok), 14,130 votes; Ilkka Kanerva (Kok), 8,843 votes; Marjukka Karttunen-Raiskio (Kok), 4,943 votes; Marjaana Koskinen (SDP), 7,874 votes; Annika Lapintie (Vas), 8,299 votes; Jukka Mikkola (SDP), 5,722 votes; Heli Paasio (SDP), 7,175 votes; Maija Perho (Kok), 6,370 votes; Virpa Puisto (SDP), 6,890 votes; Mauri Salo (Kesk), 6,248 votes; and Ismo Seivästö (SKL).

===== 1995 =====
Results of the 1995 parliamentary election held on 19 March 1995:

Party		Party			Electoral Alliance		
Party		Votes	%	Seats	Votes	%	Seats
Social Democratic Party of Finland	SDP	68,099	27.56%	5	68,099	27.56%	5
National Coalition Party	Kok	57,492	23.26%	5	57,492	23.26%	5
Centre Party	Kesk	37,053	14.99%	3	53,293	21.57%	4
Swedish People's Party of Finland	SFP	11,163	4.52%	1	53,293	21.57%	4
Finnish Christian League	SKL	4,585	1.86%	0	53,293	21.57%	4
Liberal People's Party	LKP	492	0.20%	0	53,293	21.57%	4
Left Alliance	Vas	32,747	13.25%	2	32,747	13.25%	2
Green League	Vihr	14,388	5.82%	1	14,388	5.82%	1
Young Finns	Nuor	10,698	4.33%	0	10,698	4.33%	0
Finnish Rural Party	SMP	2,646	1.07%	0	3,694	1.49%	0
Pensioners for People	ELKA	466	0.19%	0	3,694	1.49%	0
Women's Party	NAISP	308	0.12%	0	3,694	1.49%	0
Ecological Party the Greens	EKO	274	0.11%	0	3,694	1.49%	0
Alliance for Free Finland	VSL	2,302	0.93%	0	2,302	0.93%	0
Other Joint List		2,075	0.84%	0	2,075	0.84%	0
Other Joint List		1,045	0.42%	0	1,045	0.42%	0
Natural Law Party	LLP	694	0.28%	0	694	0.28%	0
Communist Workers' Party – For Peace and Socialism	KTP	345	0.14%	0	345	0.14%	0
Maarit Nermes (Independent)		137	0.06%	0	137	0.06%	0
Juhani Tuomola (Independent)		82	0.03%	0	82	0.03%	0
Heikki Nurminen (Independent)		20	0.01%	0	20	0.01%	0
Joint Responsibility Party	YYP	12	0.00%	0	12	0.00%	0
Valid votes		247,123	100.00%	17	247,123	100.00%	17
Rejected votes		1,774	0.71%				
Total polled		248,897	71.44%				
Registered electors		348,401					

The following candidates were elected: Olavi Ala-Nissilä (Kesk), 8,329 votes; Janina Andersson (Vihr), 5,244 votes; Jan-Erik Enestam (SFP), 8,462 votes; Liisa Hyssälä (Kesk), 5,838 votes; Mikko Immonen (Vas), 7,486 votes; Ville Itälä (Kok), 6,108 votes; Timo Järvilahti (Kesk), 6,596 votes; Marjut Kaarilahti (Kok), 3,243 votes; Ilkka Kanerva (Kok), 6,685 votes; Marjaana Koskinen (SDP), 5,153 votes; Annika Lapintie (Vas), 11,677 votes; Jukka Mikkola (SDP), 6,160 votes; Sauli Niinistö (Kok), 18,946 votes; Pertti Paasio (SDP), 14,606 votes; Maija Perho (Kok), 8,805 votes; Virpa Puisto (SDP), 7,136 votes; and Jukka Roos (SDP), 7,393 votes.

===== 1991 =====
Results of the 1991 parliamentary election held on 17 March 1991:

Party		Party			Electoral Alliance		
Party		Votes	%	Seats	Votes	%	Seats
Centre Party	Kesk	54,902	22.92%	4	72,237	30.16%	6
Swedish People's Party of Finland	SFP	12,631	5.27%	1	72,237	30.16%	6
Finnish Christian League	SKL	4,704	1.96%	1	72,237	30.16%	6
Social Democratic Party of Finland	SDP	54,595	22.80%	4	54,595	22.80%	4
National Coalition Party	Kok	53,102	22.17%	4	53,102	22.17%	4
Left Alliance	Vas	26,920	11.24%	2	26,920	11.24%	2
Finnish Rural Party	SMP	15,217	6.35%	1	16,239	6.78%	1
Pensioners' Party	SEP	733	0.31%	0	16,239	6.78%	1
Independent Non-Aligned Pensioners	ELKA	289	0.12%	0	16,239	6.78%	1
Green League	Vihr	11,401	4.76%	0	11,401	4.76%	0
The Greens	EKO	1,631	0.68%	0	2,474	1.03%	0
Liberal People's Party	LKP	843	0.35%	0	2,474	1.03%	0
Women's Party	NAISL	1,324	0.55%	0	1,324	0.55%	0
Communist Workers' Party – For Peace and Socialism	KTP	641	0.27%	0	641	0.27%	0
Kari Lamberg (Independent)		326	0.14%	0	326	0.14%	0
Humanity Party		227	0.09%	0	227	0.09%	0
Valid votes		239,486	100.00%	17	239,486	100.00%	17
Blank votes		3,651	1.50%				
Rejected Votess – Other		364	0.15%				
Total polled		243,501	70.16%				
Registered electors		347,090					

The following candidates were elected: Olavi Ala-Nissilä (Kesk), 4,729 votes; Heli Astala (Vas), 5,363 votes; Jan-Erik Enestam (SFP), 10,480 votes; Timo Järvilahti (Kesk), 7,190 votes; Marjut Kaarilahti (Kok), 4,788 votes; Ilkka Kanerva (Kok), 11,660 votes; Eeva Kuuskoski (Kesk), 21,743 votes; Ensio Laine (Vas), 7,067 votes; Jarmo Laivoranta (Kesk), 5,876 votes; Sauli Niinistö (Kok), 6,216 votes; Pertti Paasio (SDP), 9,851 votes; Maija Perho (Kok), 6,585 votes; Virpa Puisto (SDP), 6,593 votes; Mikko Rönnholm (SDP), 4,783 votes; Jukka Roos (SDP), 8,444 votes; Ismo Seivästö (SKL), 4,704 votes; and Hannu Suhonen (SMP), 4,417 votes.

==== 1980s ====
===== 1987 =====
Results of the 1987 parliamentary election held on 15 and 16 March 1987:

Party		Party			Electoral Alliance		
Party		Votes	%	Seats	Votes	%	Seats
National Coalition Party	Kok	61,927	25.28%	5	61,927	25.28%	5
Centre Party	Kesk	35,824	14.63%	2	56,858	23.21%	4
Swedish People's Party of Finland	SFP	15,608	6.37%	1	56,858	23.21%	4
Finnish Christian League	SKL	4,378	1.79%	1	56,858	23.21%	4
Liberal People's Party	LKP	1,048	0.43%	0	56,858	23.21%	4
Social Democratic Party of Finland	SDP	55,247	22.55%	4	55,247	22.55%	4
Finnish People's Democratic League	SKDL	24,281	9.91%	2	24,281	9.91%	2
Finnish Rural Party	SMP	21,896	8.94%	1	21,896	8.94%	1
Democratic Alternative	DEVA	13,789	5.63%	1	13,789	5.63%	1
Green League	Vihr	6,406	2.62%	0	6,406	2.62%	0
Pensioners' Party	SEP	4,442	1.81%	0	4,442	1.81%	0
Annikki Vartama (Independent)		55	0.02%	0	55	0.02%	0
Joint List B		47	0.02%	0	47	0.02%	0
Valid votes		244,948	100.00%	17	244,948	100.00%	17
Rejected votes		1,230	0.50%				
Total polled		246,178	74.02%				
Registered electors		332,604					

The following candidates were elected: Risto Ahonen (SDP), 5,531 votes; Heli Astala (SKDL), 6,850 votes; Sauli Hautala (SKL), 4,198 votes; Liisa Hilpelä (Kok), 7,400 votes; Tapio Holvitie (Kok), 5,869 votes; Anna-Liisa Jokinen (SKDL), 2,683 votes; Ilkka Kanerva (Kok), 10,772 votes; Eeva Kuuskoski (Kesk), 15,672 votes; Ensio Laine (DEVA), 7,067 votes; Sauli Niinistö (Kok), 6,976 votes; Pertti Paasio (SDP), 8,044 votes; Heikki Perho (Kok), 7,071 votes; Virpa Puisto (SDP), 5,935 votes; Jukka Roos (SDP), 5,422 votes; Taisto Tähkämaa (Kesk), 4,153 votes; Christoffer Taxell (SFP), 14,006 votes; and Pekka Vennamo (SMP), 12,638 votes.

===== 1983 =====
Results of the 1983 parliamentary election held on 20 and 21 March 1983:

Party		Party			Electoral Alliance		
Party		Votes	%	Seats	Votes	%	Seats
Social Democratic Party of Finland	SDP	62,763	24.87%	5	62,763	24.87%	5
National Coalition Party	Kok	58,952	23.36%	4	58,952	23.36%	4
Centre Party and Liberal People's Party	Kesk-LKP	32,540	12.89%	2	45,984	18.22%	3
Swedish People's Party of Finland	SFP	13,444	5.33%	1	45,984	18.22%	3
Finnish People's Democratic League	SKDL	37,540	14.87%	3	37,540	14.87%	3
Finnish Rural Party	SMP	34,459	13.65%	2	34,459	13.65%	2
Finnish Christian League	SKL	7,208	2.86%	0	7,284	2.89%	0
Union for Democracy	KVL	76	0.03%	0	7,284	2.89%	0
Joint List A (Green League)		5,420	2.15%	0	5,420	2.15%	0
Valid votes		252,402	100.00%	17	252,402	100.00%	17
Rejected votes		972	0.38%				
Total polled		253,374	77.73%				
Registered electors		325,962					

The following candidates were elected: Risto Ahonen (SDP), 5,490 votes; Heli Astala (SKDL), 6,470 votes; Paula Eenilä (SDP), 6,641 votes; Liisa Hilpelä (Kok), 7,249 votes; Tapio Holvitie (Kok), 8,036 votes; Anna-Liisa Jokinen (SKDL), 4,156 votes; Ilkka Kanerva (Kok), 5,893 votes; Eeva Kuuskoski (Kesk-LKP), 5,991 votes; Ensio Laine (SKDL), 9,023 votes; Jukka Mikkola (SDP), 5,603 votes; Pertti Paasio (SDP), 8,520 votes; Heikki Perho (Kok), 7,291 votes; Martti Ratu (SMP), 3,110 votes; Mikko Rönnholm (SDP), 6,571 votes; Taisto Tähkämaa (Kesk-LKP), 7,860 votes; Christoffer Taxell (SFP), 12,357 votes; and Pekka Vennamo (SMP), 25,088 votes.

==== 1970s ====
===== 1979 =====
Results of the 1979 parliamentary election held on 18 and 19 March 1979:

Party		Party			Electoral Alliance		
Party		Votes	%	Seats	Votes	%	Seats
National Coalition Party	Kok	60,655	24.66%	5	60,655	24.66%	5
Social Democratic Party of Finland	SDP	55,676	22.63%	4	55,676	22.63%	4
Finnish People's Democratic League	SKDL	47,863	19.46%	3	48,189	19.59%	3
Socialist Workers Party	STP	326	0.13%	0	48,189	19.59%	3
Centre Party	Kesk	31,661	12.87%	2	42,685	17.35%	3
Swedish People's Party of Finland	SFP	11,024	4.48%	1	42,685	17.35%	3
Finnish Rural Party	SMP	14,332	5.83%	1	26,341	10.71%	2
Finnish Christian League	SKL	10,081	4.10%	1	26,341	10.71%	2
Constitutional People's Party	PKP	1,928	0.78%	0	26,341	10.71%	2
Liberal People's Party	LKP	12,114	4.92%	0	12,114	4.92%	0
Finnish People's Unity Party	SKYP	332	0.13%	0	332	0.13%	0
Valid votes		245,992	100.00%	17	245,992	100.00%	17
Rejected votes		827	0.34%				
Total polled		246,819	76.79%				
Registered electors		321,430					

The following candidates were elected: Heli Astala (SKDL), 9,692 votes; Reino Breilin (SDP), 5,828 votes; Paula Eenilä (SDP), 10,904 votes; Sauli Hautala (SKL), 7,115 votes; Tapio Holvitie (Kok), 8,168 votes; Anna-Liisa Jokinen (SKDL), 7,332 votes; Ilkka Kanerva (Kok), 7,993 votes; Eeva Kuuskoski (Kok), 9,141 votes; Ensio Laine (SKDL), 7,904 votes; Arto Lampinen (Kok), 7,026 votes; Lauri Palmunen (Kesk), 8,022 votes; Heikki Perho (Kok), 6,202 votes; Mikko Rönnholm (SDP), 5,740 votes; Jacob Söderman (SDP), 7,643 votes; Taisto Tähkämaa (Kesk), 7,147 votes; Christoffer Taxell (SFP), 10,303 votes; and Pekka Vennamo (SMP), 12,657 votes.

===== 1975 =====
Results of the 1975 parliamentary election held on 21 and 22 September 1975:

Party		Party			Electoral Alliance		
Party		Votes	%	Seats	Votes	%	Seats
National Coalition Party	Kok	50,429	21.72%	3	58,279	25.10%	4
Finnish Christian League	SKL	7,850	3.38%	1	58,279	25.10%	4
Centre Party	Kesk	31,545	13.58%	2	55,337	23.83%	4
Liberal People's Party	LKP	11,995	5.17%	1	55,337	23.83%	4
Swedish People's Party of Finland	SFP	11,797	5.08%	1	55,337	23.83%	4
Finnish People's Democratic League	SKDL	50,552	21.77%	4	51,167	22.03%	4
Socialist Workers Party	STP	615	0.26%	0	51,167	22.03%	4
Social Democratic Party of Finland	SDP	50,013	21.54%	4	50,013	21.54%	4
Finnish Rural Party	SMP	7,934	3.42%	0	10,340	4.45%	0
Finnish Constitutional People's Party	SPK	1,885	0.81%	0	10,340	4.45%	0
Party of Finnish Entrepreneurs	SYP	521	0.22%	0	10,340	4.45%	0
Finnish People's Unity Party	SKYP	7,075	3.05%	0	7,075	3.05%	0
Valid votes		232,211	100.00%	16	232,211	100.00%	16
Rejected votes		871	0.37%				
Total polled		233,082	74.71%				
Registered electors		311,973					

The following candidates were elected: Paavo Aitio (SKDL), 9,398 votes; Reino Breilin (SDP), 7,745 votes; Paula Eenilä (SDP), 8,692 votes; Sauli Hautala (SKL), 7,452 votes; Anna-Liisa Jokinen (SKDL), 9,735 votes; Ilkka Kanerva (Kok), 8,921 votes; Ensio Laine (SKDL), 7,488 votes; Arto Lampinen (Kok), 9,699 votes; Arto Merisaari (SKDL), 11,910 votes; Pertti Paasio (SDP), 7,021 votes; Heikki Perho (Kok), 5,757 votes; Jacob Söderman (SDP), 5,536 votes; V. J. Sukselainen (Kesk), 6,779 votes; Taisto Tähkämaa (Kesk), 7,062 votes; Christoffer Taxell (SFP), 10,349 votes; and Irma Toivanen (LKP), 10,280 votes.

===== 1972 =====
Results of the 1972 parliamentary election held on 2 and 3 January 1972:

Party		Party			Electoral Alliance		
Party		Votes	%	Seats	Votes	%	Seats
Social Democratic Party of Finland	SDP	53,411	24.56%	4	53,411	24.56%	4
Finnish People's Democratic League	SKDL	44,454	20.44%	3	46,411	21.34%	3
Social Democratic Union of Workers and Smallholders	TPSL	1,957	0.90%	0	46,411	21.34%	3
National Coalition Party	Kok	41,421	19.04%	3	41,421	19.04%	3
Centre Party	Kesk	26,957	12.39%	2	39,075	17.96%	3
Swedish People's Party of Finland	SFP	12,118	5.57%	1	39,075	17.96%	3
Finnish Rural Party	SMP	19,214	8.83%	2	19,214	8.83%	2
Liberal People's Party	LKP	13,218	6.08%	1	13,218	6.08%	1
Finnish Christian League	SKL	4,761	2.19%	0	4,761	2.19%	0
Valid votes		217,511	100.00%	16	217,511	100.00%	16
Rejected votes		844	0.39%				
Total polled		218,355	80.69%				
Registered electors		270,596					

The following candidates were elected: Paavo Aitio (SKDL), 13,531 votes; Reino Breilin (SDP), 7,487 votes; Anna-Liisa Jokinen (SKDL), 7,650 votes; Mauno Kurppa (SMP), 5,587 votes; Olavi Lähteenmäki (Kok), 5,460 votes; Ensio Laine (SKDL), 6,881 votes; Esko Niskanen (SDP), 6,076 votes; Rafael Paasio (SDP), 9,368 votes; Arvo Sainio (SMP), 4,683 votes; Sylvi Siltanen (SDP), 9,967 votes; V. J. Sukselainen (Kesk), 5,501 votes; Taisto Tähkämaa (Kesk), 7,734 votes; Carl Olof Tallgren (SFP), 11,357 votes; Irma Toivanen (LKP), 4,570 votes; Tauno Vartia (Kok), 5,262 votes; and Juha Vikatmaa (Kok), 14,115 votes.

===== 1970 =====
Results of the 1970 parliamentary election held on 15 and 16 March 1970:

Party		Party			Electoral Alliance		
Party		Votes	%	Seats	Votes	%	Seats
Social Democratic Party of Finland	SDP	47,190	22.19%	4	47,190	22.19%	4
Finnish People's Democratic League	SKDL	42,909	20.17%	4	42,909	20.17%	4
Centre Party	Kesk	29,826	14.02%	2	41,513	19.52%	3
Swedish People's Party of Finland	SFP	11,687	5.49%	1	41,513	19.52%	3
National Coalition Party	Kok	40,208	18.90%	3	40,208	18.90%	3
Finnish Rural Party	SMP	20,470	9.62%	1	20,470	9.62%	1
Liberal People's Party	LKP	14,759	6.94%	1	14,759	6.94%	1
Social Democratic Union of Workers and Smallholders	TPSL	2,967	1.39%	0	2,967	1.39%	0
Finnish Christian League	SKL	2,485	1.17%	0	2,485	1.17%	0
Vilho Hallenberg (Independent)		131	0.06%	0	131	0.06%	0
Vieno Sulo Selim Laiho (Independent)		47	0.02%	0	47	0.02%	0
Vesa Antero Hyvärinen (Independent)		24	0.01%	0	24	0.01%	0
Valid votes		212,703	100.00%	16	212,703	100.00%	16
Rejected votes		645	0.30%				
Total polled		213,348	81.34%				
Registered electors		262,277					

The following candidates were elected: Paavo Aitio (SKDL), 12,164 votes; Reino Breilin (SDP), 5,879 votes; Anna-Liisa Jokinen (SKDL), 5,691 votes; Katri Kaarlonen (Kesk), 6,293 votes; Mauno Kurppa (SMP), 4,281 votes; Olavi Lähteenmäki (Kok), 8,351 votes; Ensio Laine (SKDL), 5,498 votes; Esko Niskanen (SDP), 5,286 votes; Rafael Paasio (SDP), 6,898 votes; Sylvi Siltanen (SDP), 9,712 votes; Oili Suomi (SKDL), 3,631 votes; Taisto Tähkämaa (Kesk), 4,844 votes; Carl Olof Tallgren (SFP), 11,687 votes; Irma Toivanen (LKP), 2,111 votes; Tauno Vartia (Kok), 5,138 votes; and Juha Vikatmaa (Kok), 11,324 votes.

==== 1960s ====
===== 1966 =====
Results of the 1966 parliamentary election held on 20 and 21 March 1966:

Party		Party			Electoral Alliance		
Party		Votes	%	Seats	Votes	%	Seats
Social Democratic Party of Finland	SDP	54,119	26.87%	5	54,119	26.87%	5
Finnish People's Democratic League	SKDL	48,820	24.24%	3	53,349	26.49%	4
Social Democratic Union of Workers and Smallholders	TPSL	4,529	2.25%	1	53,349	26.49%	4
Centre Party	Kesk	36,215	17.98%	3	36,215	17.98%	3
National Coalition Party	Kok	26,015	12.92%	2	26,015	12.92%	2
Liberal People's Party	LKP	19,055	9.46%	1	19,055	9.46%	1
Swedish People's Party of Finland	SFP	12,646	6.28%	1	12,646	6.28%	1
Write-in lists		3	0.00%	0	3	0.00%	0
Valid votes		201,402	100.00%	16	201,402	100.00%	16
Blank votes		4	0.00%				
Rejected Votess – Other		623	0.31%				
Total polled		202,029	84.84%				
Registered electors		238,143					

The following candidates were elected: Paavo Aitio (SKDL), 13,790 votes; Reino Breilin (SDP), 6,654 votes; Vappu Heinonen (TPSL), 4,529 votes; Voitto Hellsten (SDP), 5,943 votes; Mauno Jussila (Kesk), 6,692 votes; Katri Kaarlonen (Kesk), 5,299 votes; Irma Karvikko (LKP), 5,491 votes; Olavi Lähteenmäki (Kok), 5,244 votes; Aimo Laiho (SKDL), 3,593 votes; Esko Niskanen (SDP), 6,667 votes; Rafael Paasio (SDP), 10,342 votes; Pekka Silander (SKDL), 5,059 votes; Sylvi Siltanen (SDP), 8,899 votes; V. J. Sukselainen (Kesk), 5,515 votes; Carl Olof Tallgren (SFP), 7,132 votes; and Tauno Vartia (Kok), 4,695 votes.

===== 1962 =====
Results of the 1962 parliamentary election held on 4 and 5 February 1962:

Party		Party			Electoral Alliance		
Party		Votes	%	Seats	Votes	%	Seats
Agrarian Party	ML	37,224	18.96%	3	74,548	37.97%	7
People's Party of Finland	SK	24,158	12.30%	2	74,548	37.97%	7
Swedish People's Party of Finland	SFP	13,166	6.71%	2	74,548	37.97%	7
Finnish People's Democratic League	SKDL	48,973	24.94%	4	48,973	24.94%	4
Social Democratic Party of Finland	SDP	35,511	18.09%	3	35,511	18.09%	3
National Coalition Party	Kok	24,570	12.51%	2	24,570	12.51%	2
Social Democratic Union of Workers and Smallholders	TPSL	9,581	4.88%	0	9,581	4.88%	0
Smallholders' Party of Finland	SPP	3,151	1.60%	0	3,151	1.60%	0
Write-in lists		1	0.00%	0	1	0.00%	0
Valid votes		196,335	100.00%	16	196,335	100.00%	16
Rejected votes		625	0.32%				
Total polled		196,960	85.09%				
Registered electors		231,468					

The following candidates were elected: Paavo Aitio (SKDL), 14,904 votes; Voitto Hellsten (SDP), 4,965 votes; Mauno Jussila (ML), 8,306 votes; Urho Kähönen (ML), 6,878 votes; Irma Karvikko (SK), 9,115 votes; Harras Kyttä (SK), 9,944 votes; Olavi Lähteenmäki (Kok), 8,843 votes; Aimo Laiho (SKDL), 3,466 votes; Per Laurén (SFP), 6,060 votes; Judit Nederström-Lundén (SKDL), 6,768 votes; Rafael Paasio (SDP), 8,458 votes; Kalervo Saura (Kok), 5,111 votes; Sylvi Siltanen (SDP), 7,267 votes; V. J. Sukselainen (ML), 10,078 votes; Carl Olof Tallgren (SFP), 6,890 votes; and Inkeri Virtanen (SKDL), 3,547 votes.

==== 1950s ====
===== 1958 =====
Results of the 1958 parliamentary election held on 6 and 7 July 1958:

Party		Party			Electoral Alliance		
Party		Votes	%	Seats	Votes	%	Seats
Finnish People's Democratic League	SKDL	41,908	25.78%	5	41,908	25.78%	5
Social Democratic Party of Finland	SDP	37,243	22.91%	4	37,243	22.91%	4
Agrarian Party	ML	32,063	19.72%	3	32,063	19.72%	3
National Coalition Party	Kok	23,294	14.33%	2	23,517	14.46%	2
Liberal League	VL	223	0.14%	0	23,517	14.46%	2
People's Party of Finland	SK	16,514	10.16%	1	16,514	10.16%	1
Swedish People's Party of Finland	SFP	11,330	6.97%	1	11,330	6.97%	1
Write-in lists		8	0.00%	0	8	0.00%	0
Valid votes		162,583	100.00%	16	162,583	100.00%	16
Rejected votes		794	0.49%				
Total polled		163,377	72.88%				
Registered electors		224,179					

The following candidates were elected: Aimo Aaltonen (SKDL), 4,719 votes; Paavo Aitio (SKDL), 7,475 votes; Vappu Heinonen (SDP), 4,588 votes; Mauno Jussila (ML), 5,622 votes; Urho Kähönen (ML), 5,223 votes; Urho Kulovaara (SDP), 4,440 votes; Harras Kyttä (SK), 5,284 votes; Olavi Lähteenmäki (Kok), 5,265 votes; Judit Nederström-Lundén (SKDL), 7,292 votes; Rafael Paasio (SDP), 5,768 votes; Eino Roine (SKDL), 4,145 votes; Kalervo Saura (Kok), 4,858 votes; Sylvi Siltanen (SDP), 5,038 votes; V. J. Sukselainen (ML), 7,644 votes; Ralf Törngren (SFP), 6,505 votes; and Inkeri Virtanen (SKDL), 2,892 votes.

===== 1954 =====
Results of the 1954 parliamentary election held on 7 and 8 March 1954:

Party		Votes	%	Seats
Finnish People's Democratic League	SKDL	42,027	24.47%	4
Social Democratic Party of Finland	SDP	40,120	23.36%	4
Agrarian Party	ML	33,847	19.70%	3
People's Party of Finland	SK	22,082	12.85%	2
National Coalition Party	Kok	20,177	11.75%	2
Swedish People's Party of Finland	SFP	13,518	7.87%	1
Write-in lists		8	0.00%	0
Valid votes		171,779	100.00%	16
Rejected votes		640	0.37%	
Total polled		172,419	77.99%	
Registered electors		221,067		

The following candidates were elected: Aimo Aaltonen (SKDL); Paavo Aitio (SKDL); Vappu Heinonen (SDP); Niilo Honkala (Kok); Kalle Jokinen (SDP); Mauno Jussila (ML); Urho Kähönen (ML); Irma Karvikko (SK); Urho Kulovaara (SDP); Harras Kyttä (SK); Judit Nederström-Lundén (SKDL); Rafael Paasio (SDP); Eino Roine (SKDL); Kalervo Saura (Kok); V. J. Sukselainen (ML); and Ralf Törngren (SFP).

===== 1951 =====
Results of the 1951 parliamentary election held on 1 and 2 July 1951:

Party		Party			Electoral Alliance		
Party		Votes	%	Seats	Votes	%	Seats
Agrarian Party	ML	30,624	19.40%	3	43,556	27.59%	5
Swedish People's Party of Finland	SFP	12,932	8.19%	2	43,556	27.59%	5
Finnish People's Democratic League	SKDL	38,453	24.36%	4	38,453	24.36%	4
Social Democratic Party of Finland	SDP	37,990	24.07%	4	37,990	24.07%	4
National Coalition Party	Kok	22,270	14.11%	2	22,270	14.11%	2
People's Party of Finland	SK	15,550	9.85%	2	15,550	9.85%	2
Write-in lists		24	0.02%	0	24	0.02%	0
Valid votes		157,843	100.00%	17	157,843	100.00%	17
Rejected votes		944	0.59%				
Total polled		158,787	73.29%				
Registered electors		216,653					

The following candidates were elected: Aimo Aaltonen (SKDL); Paavo Aitio (SKDL); Vappu Heinonen (SDP); Ture Hollstén (SFP); Niilo Honkala (Kok); Kalle Jokinen (SDP); Mauno Jussila (ML); Urho Kähönen (ML); Irma Karvikko (SK); Urho Kulovaara (SDP); Harras Kyttä (SK); Judit Nederström-Lundén (SKDL); Anna Nevalainen (SKDL); Rafael Paasio (SDP); Kalervo Saura (Kok); V. J. Sukselainen (ML); and Ralf Törngren (SFP).

==== 1940s ====
===== 1948 =====
Results of the 1948 parliamentary election held on 1 and 2 July 1948:

Party		Votes	%	Seats
Finnish People's Democratic League	SKDL	37,910	25.34%	4
Social Democratic Party of Finland	SDP	36,179	24.18%	4
Agrarian Party	ML	24,817	16.59%	2
National Coalition Party	Kok	24,090	16.10%	2
Swedish People's Party of Finland	SFP	13,796	9.22%	1
National Progressive Party	KE	12,587	8.41%	1
Write-in lists		250	0.17%	0
Valid votes		149,629	100.00%	14
Rejected votes		807	0.54%	
Total polled		150,436	78.83%	
Registered electors		190,842		

The following candidates were elected: Aimo Aaltonen (SKDL); Aarne Honka (Kok); Niilo Honkala (Kok); Kalle Jokinen (SDP); Irma Karvikko (KE); Urho Kulovaara (SDP); Aino Lehtokoski (SDP); Anna Nevalainen (SKDL); Rafael Paasio (SDP); Mauri Perkonoja (SKDL); Eino Roine (SKDL); Samuli Simula (ML); V. J. Sukselainen (ML); and Ralf Törngren (SFP).

===== 1945 =====
Results of the 1945 parliamentary election held on 17 and 18 March 1945:

Party		Party			Electoral Alliance		
Party		Votes	%	Seats	Votes	%	Seats
Finnish People's Democratic League	SKDL	39,201	27.98%	5	39,985	28.54%	5
Small Farmers Party		784	0.56%	0	39,985	28.54%	5
Social Democratic Party of Finland	SDP	30,627	21.86%	3	30,627	21.86%	3
Swedish People's Party of Finland	SFP	20,536	14.66%	2	20,536	14.66%	2
National Coalition Party	Kok	18,960	13.53%	2	18,960	13.53%	2
Agrarian Party	ML	17,241	12.30%	2	17,241	12.30%	2
National Progressive Party	KE	12,422	8.87%	1	12,422	8.87%	1
Write-in lists		343	0.24%	0	343	0.24%	0
Valid votes		140,114	100.00%	15	140,114	100.00%	15
Rejected votes		959	0.68%				
Total polled		141,073	77.54%				
Registered electors		181,943					

The following candidates were elected: Aimo Aaltonen (SKDL); Ture Hollstén (SFP); Niilo Honkala (Kok); Kalle Jokinen (SDP); Jalmari Kulmala (SKDL); Urho Kulovaara (SDP); Aino Lehtokoski (SDP); Leo Leppä (Kok); Vihtori Metsäranta (SKDL); Anna Nevalainen (SKDL); Juho Pilppula (ML); Eino Roine (SKDL); Samuli Simula (ML); Yrjö Suontausta (KE); and Ralf Törngren (SFP).

==== 1930s ====
===== 1939 =====
Results of the 1939 parliamentary election held on 1 and 2 July 1939:

Party		Party			Electoral Alliance		
Party		Votes	%	Seats	Votes	%	Seats
Social Democratic Party of Finland	SDP	42,243	40.49%	6	42,243	40.49%	6
Swedish People's Party of Finland	SFP	21,190	20.31%	3	21,190	20.31%	3
Agrarian Party	ML	11,800	11.31%	2	18,733	17.96%	3
National Progressive Party	KE	6,933	6.65%	1	18,733	17.96%	3
National Coalition Party	Kok	13,865	13.29%	2	13,865	13.29%	2
Patriotic People's Movement	IKL	7,063	6.77%	1	7,063	6.77%	1
Party of Smallholders and Rural People	PMP	1,146	1.10%	0	1,146	1.10%	0
Write-in lists		89	0.09%	0	89	0.09%	0
Valid votes		104,329	100.00%	15	104,329	100.00%	15
Rejected votes		301	0.29%				
Total polled		104,630	66.03%				
Registered electors		158,457					

The following candidates were elected: Mikko Erich (SDP); Einar Holmberg (SFP); Aarne Honka (Kok); Hugo Johansson (SFP); Kalle Jokinen (SDP); Einari Karvetti (ML); Arvo Ketonen (KE); Aku Korvenoja (Kok); Urho Kulovaara (SDP); Aino Lehtokoski (SDP); Gottfrid Lindström (SDP); Kustaa Perho (SDP); Juho Pilppula (ML); Yrjö Saarinen (IKL); and Ralf Törngren (SFP).

===== 1936 =====
Results of the 1936 parliamentary election held on 1 and 2 July 1936:

Party		Votes	%	Seats
Social Democratic Party of Finland	SDP	36,458	38.68%	7
Swedish People's Party of Finland	SFP	20,511	21.76%	3
National Coalition Party	Kok	11,007	11.68%	2
Agrarian Party	ML	10,772	11.43%	2
National Progressive Party	KE	8,160	8.66%	1
Patriotic People's Movement	IKL	6,258	6.64%	1
Small Farmers' Party of Finland	SPP	986	1.05%	0
Write-in lists		114	0.12%	0
Valid votes		94,266	100.00%	16
Rejected votes		591	0.62%	
Total polled		94,857	61.61%	
Registered electors		153,958		

The following candidates were elected: Rafael Colliander (SFP); Yrjö Helenius (SDP); Aarne Honka (Kok); Emil Jokinen (SDP); Kalle Jokinen (SDP); Einari Karvetti (ML); Edvard Kilpeläinen (Kok); Toivo Mikael Kivimäki (KE); Urho Kulovaara (SDP); Karl Laurén (SFP); Aino Lehtokoski (SDP); Gottfrid Lindström (SDP); Kustaa Perho (SDP); Juho Pilppula (ML); Yrjö Saarinen (IKL); and Ralf Törngren (SFP).

===== 1933 =====
Results of the 1933 parliamentary election held on 1, 2 and 3 July 1933:

Party		Party			Electoral Alliance		
Party		Votes	%	Seats	Votes	%	Seats
Social Democratic Labour Party of Finland	SDTP	30,682	34.78%	6	30,682	34.78%	6
Swedish People's Party of Finland	SFP	17,709	20.08%	3	17,709	20.08%	3
National Coalition Party and Patriotic People's Movement	Kok-IKL	16,091	18.24%	3	16,091	18.24%	3
Agrarian Party	ML	12,087	13.70%	2	12,087	13.70%	2
National Progressive Party	KE	10,791	12.23%	2	11,575	13.12%	2
Small Farmers' Party of Finland	SPP	784	0.89%	0	11,575	13.12%	2
Write-in lists		64	0.07%	0	64	0.07%	0
Valid votes		88,208	100.00%	16	88,208	100.00%	16
Rejected votes		428	0.48%				
Total polled		88,636	59.85%				
Registered electors		148,087					

The following candidates were elected: Aleksi Aaltonen (SDTP); Rafael Colliander (SFP); Aarne Honka (Kok-IKL); Emil Jokinen (SDTP); Kaarlo Kares (Kok-IKL); Einari Karvetti (ML); Aku Korvenoja (Kok-IKL); Urho Kulovaara (SDTP); Aino Lehtokoski (SDTP); Gottfrid Lindström (SDTP); Herman Mattsson (SFP); Kustaa Perho (SDTP); Juho Pilppula (ML); Johan Sjöblom (SFP); Urho Toivola (KE); and Toivo Tyrni (KE).

===== 1930 =====
Results of the 1930 parliamentary election held on 1 and 2 October 1930:

Party		Party			Electoral Alliance		
Party		Votes	%	Seats	Votes	%	Seats
Swedish People's Party of Finland	SFP	19,505	21.85%	3	57,720	64.65%	11
National Coalition Party	Kok	17,920	20.07%	4	57,720	64.65%	11
Agrarian Party	ML	13,085	14.66%	2	57,720	64.65%	11
National Progressive Party	KE	7,210	8.08%	2	57,720	64.65%	11
Social Democratic Labour Party of Finland	SDTP	28,399	31.81%	5	28,399	31.81%	5
Socialist Electoral Organisation of Workers and Smallholders	STPV	1,829	2.05%	0	1,829	2.05%	0
Small Farmers' Party of Finland	SPP	1,198	1.34%	0	1,198	1.34%	0
Write-in lists		138	0.15%	0	138	0.15%	0
Valid votes		89,284	100.00%	16	89,284	100.00%	16
Rejected votes		550	0.61%				
Total polled		89,834	62.28%				
Registered electors		144,240					

The following candidates were elected: Aleksi Aaltonen (SDTP); Emil Jokinen (SDTP); Alli Kallioniemi (Kok); Juho Kaskinen (KE); Edvard Kilpeläinen (Kok); Toivo Mikael Kivimäki (KE); Urho Kulovaara (SDTP); Aino Lehtokoski (SDTP); Erkki Perheentupa (Kok); Kustaa Perho (SDTP); Juho Pilppula (ML); Emil Roos (SFP); Torsten Rothberg (SFP); Paavo Saarinen (ML); Gunnar Sahlstein (Kok); and Emil Sarlin (SFP).

==== 1920s ====
===== 1929 =====
Results of the 1929 parliamentary election held on 1 and 2 July 1929:

Party		Votes	%	Seats
Swedish People's Party of Finland	SFP	16,894	22.70%	4
Social Democratic Labour Party of Finland	SDTP	16,192	21.76%	4
National Coalition Party	Kok	12,188	16.38%	3
Socialist Electoral Organisation of Workers and Smallholders	STPV	11,535	15.50%	2
Agrarian Party	ML	10,853	14.58%	2
National Progressive Party	KE	5,392	7.25%	1
Small Farmers' Party of Finland	SPP	1,015	1.36%	0
Others		349	0.47%	0
Valid votes		74,418	100.00%	16
Rejected votes		529	0.71%	
Total polled		74,947	52.50%	
Registered electors		142,753		

The following candidates were elected: Aleksi Aaltonen (SDTP); Rafael Colliander (SFP); Anders Forsberg (SFP); Verner Halén (STPV); Bernhard Heikkilä (Kok); Emil Jokinen (SDTP); Edvard Kilpeläinen (Kok); Toivo Mikael Kivimäki (KE); Kalle Kulmala (STPV); Karl Laurén (SFP); Aino Lehtokoski (SDTP); Knut Molin (SFP); Kustaa Perho (SDTP); Juho Pilppula (ML); Paavo Saarinen (ML); and Gunnar Sahlstein (Kok).

===== 1927 =====
Results of the 1927 parliamentary election held on 1 and 2 July 1927:

Party		Votes	%	Seats
Swedish People's Party of Finland	SFP	18,186	23.61%	4
Social Democratic Labour Party of Finland	SDTP	16,891	21.93%	4
National Coalition Party	Kok	14,219	18.46%	3
Socialist Electoral Organisation of Workers and Smallholders	STPV	10,904	14.16%	2
Agrarian Party	ML	9,393	12.20%	2
National Progressive Party	KE	7,368	9.57%	1
Write-in lists		58	0.08%	0
Valid votes		77,019	100.00%	16
Rejected votes		318	0.41%	
Total polled		77,337	56.86%	
Registered electors		136,011		

The following candidates were elected: Ernesti Aarnio (Kok); Rafael Colliander (SFP); Anders Forsberg (SFP); Bernhard Heikkilä (Kok); Emil Jokinen (SDTP); Berndt Kullberg (SFP); Kalle Kulmala (STPV); Jaakko Latvala (SDTP); Aino Lehtokoski (SDTP); Jussi Leino (SDTP); Knut Molin (SFP); Juho Pilppula (ML); Emanuel Ramstedt (STPV); Risto Ryti (KE); Paavo Saarinen (ML); and Gunnar Sahlstein (Kok).

===== 1924 =====
Results of the 1924 parliamentary election held on 1 and 2 April 1924:

Party		Votes	%	Seats
Social Democratic Labour Party of Finland	SDTP	17,321	22.79%	4
Swedish People's Party of Finland	SFP	17,019	22.40%	4
National Coalition Party	Kok	16,409	21.59%	4
Socialist Electoral Organisation of Workers and Smallholders	STPV	10,313	13.57%	2
Agrarian Party	ML	7,767	10.22%	1
National Progressive Party	KE	7,112	9.36%	1
Write-in lists		50	0.07%	0
Valid votes		75,991	100.00%	16
Rejected votes		474	0.62%	
Total polled		76,465	57.66%	
Registered electors		132,607		

The following candidates were elected: Amos Anderson (SFP); Valentin Annala (SDTP); Waldemar Bergroth (Kok); Anders Forsberg (SFP); Bernhard Heikkilä (Kok); Toivo Mikael Kivimäki (KE); Kalle Kulmala (STPV); Karl Laurén (SFP); Aino Lehtokoski (SDTP); Jussi Leino (SDTP); Knut Molin (SFP); Emanuel Ramstedt (STPV); Juho Rannikko (Kok); Paavo Saarinen (ML); Eino Tulenheimo (Kok); and Wäinö Wuolijoki (SDTP).

===== 1922 =====
Results of the 1922 parliamentary election held on 1, 2 and 3 July 1922:

Party		Votes	%	Seats
Socialist Workers' Party of Finland	SSTP	16,295	22.05%	4
National Coalition Party	Kok	16,085	21.76%	4
Swedish People's Party of Finland	SFP	15,402	20.84%	3
Social Democratic Labour Party of Finland	SDTP	11,971	16.20%	3
National Progressive Party	KE	7,422	10.04%	1
Agrarian Party	ML	6,692	9.05%	1
Write-in lists		48	0.06%	0
Valid votes		73,915	100.00%	16
Rejected votes		753	1.01%	
Total polled		74,668	58.06%	
Registered electors		128,601		

The following candidates were elected: Amos Anderson (SFP); Waldemar Bergroth (Kok); Rafael Colliander (SFP); Väinö Hannula (SSTP); Antti Kaarne (SSTP); Väinö Kivilinna (ML); Jaakko Latvala (SDTP); Aino Lehtokoski (SDTP); Heikki Mäkinen (SSTP); Laura Numminen (SSTP); Johannes Nyberg (Kok); Antti Penttilä (KE); Juho Rannikko (Kok); Wilhelm Roos (SFP); Eino Tulenheimo (Kok); and Wäinö Wuolijoki (SDTP).

==== 1910s ====
===== 1919 =====
Results of the 1919 parliamentary election held on 1, 2 and 3 March 1919:

Party		Party			Electoral Alliance		
Party		Votes	%	Seats	Votes	%	Seats
Social Democratic Labour Party of Finland	SDTP	30,126	35.57%	6	30,126	35.57%	6
National Progressive Party	KE	11,411	13.47%	3	19,322	22.81%	4
Agrarian Party	ML	4,528	5.35%	0	19,322	22.81%	4
Christian Workers' Union of Finland	KrTL	3,383	3.99%	1	19,322	22.81%	4
Swedish People's Party of Finland	SFP	19,136	22.59%	3	19,136	22.59%	3
National Coalition Party	Kok	16,032	18.93%	3	16,032	18.93%	3
Write-in lists		78	0.09%	0	78	0.09%	0
Valid votes		84,694	100.00%	16	84,694	100.00%	16
Rejected votes		552	0.65%				
Total polled		85,246	67.78%				
Registered electors		125,773					

The following candidates were elected: Rafael Colliander (SFP); Matti Helenius-Seppälä (KrTL); Johan Helo (SDTP); Karl Holma (Kok); Juho Kaskinen (KE); Arvi Kontu (KE); Karl Laurén (SFP); Mooses Lehtinen (SDTP); Aino Lehtokoski (SDTP); Väinö Lehtonen (SDTP); Eliel Mickelsson (SDTP); Ernst Nevanlinna (Kok); Johannes Nyberg (Kok); Heikki Ritavuori (KE); Sikstus Rönnberg (SDTP); and Wilhelm Roos (SFP).

===== 1917 =====
Results of the 1917 parliamentary election held on 1 and 2 October 1917:

Party		Party			Electoral Alliance		
Party		Votes	%	Seats	Votes	%	Seats
United Finnish Parties (Finnish Party, Young Finnish Party and People's Party)	SP-NP-KP	29,634	33.33%	5	49,343	55.49%	9
Swedish People's Party of Finland	SFP	19,709	22.16%	4	49,343	55.49%	9
Social Democratic Party of Finland	SDP	35,218	39.61%	7	35,218	39.61%	7
Christian Workers' Union of Finland	KrTL	4,291	4.83%	0	4,291	4.83%	0
Write-in lists		71	0.08%	0	71	0.08%	0
Valid votes		88,923	100.00%	16	88,923	100.00%	16
Rejected votes		644	0.72%				
Total polled		89,567	71.31%				
Registered electors		125,602					

The following candidates were elected: Valentin Annala (SDP); Waldemar Bergroth (SP-NP-KP); Rafael Colliander (SFP); Evert Eloranta (SDP); Erkki Härmä (SDP); Seth Heikkilä (SDP); Jaakko Latvala (SDP); Antti Mikkola (SP-NP-KP); Ernst Nevanlinna (SP-NP-KP); Onni Rantasalo (SP-NP-KP); Wilhelm Roos (SFP); Emil Schybergson (SFP); Julius Sundblom (SFP); Elviira Vihersalo (SDP); Karl Wiik (SDP); and Iida Yrjö-Koskinen (SP-NP-KP).

===== 1916 =====
Results of the 1916 parliamentary election held on 1 and 3 July 1916:

Party		Votes	%	Seats
Social Democratic Party of Finland	SDP	30,281	39.47%	7
Swedish People's Party of Finland	SFP	18,348	23.92%	4
Finnish Party	SP	16,573	21.60%	4
Young Finnish Party	NP	7,502	9.78%	1
Christian Workers' Union of Finland	KrTL	3,968	5.17%	1
Write-in lists		39	0.05%	0
Valid votes		76,711	100.00%	17
Rejected votes		371	0.48%	
Total polled		77,082	61.68%	
Registered electors		124,964		

The following candidates were elected: Ida Aalle-Teljo (SDP); Jenny af Forselles (SFP); Juho Aitamurto (SP); Valentin Annala (SDP); Evert Eloranta (SDP); Matti Helenius-Seppälä (KrTL); William Isaksson (SFP); Juho Kaskinen (NP); Jaakko Latvala (SDP); Konrad Lehtimäki (SDP); Ernst Nevanlinna (SP); Kaarle Raade (SP); Wilhelm Roos (SFP); Julius Sundblom (SFP); Elviira Vihersalo (SDP); Karl Wiik (SDP); and Iida Yrjö-Koskinen (SP).

===== 1913 =====
Results of the 1913 parliamentary election held on 1 and 2 August 1913:

Party		Party			Electoral Alliance		
Party		Votes	%	Seats	Votes	%	Seats
Social Democratic Party of Finland	SDP	23,190	32.49%	6	23,190	32.49%	6
Swedish People's Party of Finland	SFP	19,319	27.07%	5	19,319	27.07%	5
Finnish Party	SP	17,822	24.97%	4	17,822	24.97%	4
Young Finnish Party	NP	6,949	9.74%	2	11,012	15.43%	2
Christian Workers' Union of Finland	KrTL	4,063	5.69%	0	11,012	15.43%	2
Write-in lists		34	0.05%	0	34	0.05%	0
Valid votes		71,377	100.00%	17	71,377	100.00%	17
Rejected votes		350	0.49%				
Total polled		71,727	58.72%				
Registered electors		122,156					

The following candidates were elected: Ida Aalle-Teljo (SDP); Jenny af Forselles (SFP); Valentin Annala (SDP); Evert Eloranta (SDP); John Hedberg (SFP); William Isaksson (SFP); Juho Kaskinen (NP); Edvard Kilpeläinen (SP); Konrad Lehtimäki (SDP); Ludvig Lindström (SDP); Juho Rannikko (SP); Heikki Ritavuori (NP); Wilhelm Roos (SFP); Allan Serlachius (SP); Julius Sundblom (SFP); Elviira Vihersalo (SDP); and Iida Yrjö-Koskinen (SP).

===== 1911 =====
Results of the 1911 parliamentary election held on 2 and 3 January 1911:

Party		Votes	%	Seats
Social Democratic Party of Finland	SDP	23,458	29.99%	5
Swedish People's Party of Finland	SFP	21,005	26.86%	5
Finnish Party	SP	20,991	26.84%	5
Young Finnish Party	NP	7,967	10.19%	1
Christian Workers' Union of Finland	KrTL	4,749	6.07%	1
Write-in lists		38	0.05%	0
Valid votes		78,208	100.00%	17
Rejected votes		388	0.49%	
Total polled		78,596	66.56%	
Registered electors		118,076		

The following candidates were elected: Ida Aalle-Teljo (SDP); Jenny af Forselles (SFP); Valentin Annala (SDP); Evert Eloranta (SDP); John Hedberg (SFP); Matti Helenius-Seppälä (KrTL); Pietari Kärnä (SP); Juho Kaskinen (NP); Kaarle Knuutila (SP); Jaakko Latvala (SDP); Juho Rannikko (SP); Wilhelm Roos (SFP); Wilho Sipilä (SP); Julius Sundblom (SFP); Taavi Tainio (SDP); Viktor Magnus von Born (SFP); and Iida Yrjö-Koskinen (SP).

===== 1910 =====
Results of the 1910 parliamentary election held on 1 and 2 February 1910:

Party		Votes	%	Seats
Social Democratic Party of Finland	SDP	22,828	28.92%	5
Finnish Party	SP	21,769	27.58%	5
Swedish People's Party of Finland	SFP	21,425	27.14%	5
Young Finnish Party	NP	8,214	10.41%	1
Christian Workers' Union of Finland	KrTL	4,645	5.88%	1
Write-in lists		52	0.07%	0
Valid votes		78,933	100.00%	17
Rejected votes		436	0.55%	
Total polled		79,369	68.32%	
Registered electors		116,167		

The following candidates were elected: Ida Aalle-Teljo (SDP); Jenny af Forselles (SFP); Valentin Annala (SDP); Evert Eloranta (SDP); John Hedberg (SFP); Matti Helenius-Seppälä (KrTL); Pietari Kärnä (SP); Juho Kaskinen (NP); Kaarle Knuutila (SP); Jaakko Latvala (SDP); Juho Rannikko (SP); Wilhelm Roos (SFP); Wilho Sipilä (SP); Julius Sundblom (SFP); Taavi Tainio (SDP); Viktor Magnus von Born (SFP); and Iida Yrjö-Koskinen (SP).

==== 1900s ====
===== 1909 =====
Results of the 1909 parliamentary election held on 1 and 3 May 1909:

Party		Votes	%	Seats
Finnish Party	SP	22,714	28.91%	5
Social Democratic Party of Finland	SDP	21,785	27.73%	5
Swedish People's Party of Finland	SFP	20,408	25.97%	5
Young Finnish Party	NP	7,799	9.93%	2
Christian Workers' Union of Finland	KrTL	5,795	7.38%	0
Write-in lists		71	0.09%	0
Valid votes		78,572	100.00%	17
Rejected votes		521	0.66%	
Total polled		79,093	69.13%	
Registered electors		114,405		

The following candidates were elected: Ida Aalle-Teljo (SDP); Juho Aitamurto (SP); Valentin Annala (SDP); Rafael Colliander (SFP); Evert Eloranta (SDP); John Hedberg (SFP); Valde Hirvikanta (SP); Aleksi Käpy (SP); Juho Kaskinen (NP); Antti Mikkola (NP); (Note: Originally Oskari Vihantola of the Christian Workers' Union of Finland (KrTL) had been elected at the 1909 parliamentary election but the result was annulled and Antti Mikkola of the Young Finnish Party (NP) elected instead.) Santeri Nuorteva (SDP); Juho Rannikko (SP); Wilhelm Roos (SFP); Wilho Sipilä (SP); Fredrik Stenström (SFP); Julius Sundblom (SFP); and Wäinö Wuolijoki (SDP).

===== 1908 =====
Results of the 1908 parliamentary election held on 1 and 2 July 1908:

Party		Votes	%	Seats
Finnish Party	SP	22,928	29.03%	5
Social Democratic Party of Finland	SDP	21,905	27.73%	5
Swedish People's Party of Finland	SFP	20,855	26.40%	5
Young Finnish Party	NP	7,346	9.30%	1
Christian Workers' Union of Finland	KrTL	5,871	7.43%	1
Others		78	0.10%	0
Valid votes		78,983	100.00%	17
Rejected votes		485	0.61%	
Total polled		79,468	70.44%	
Registered electors		112,815		

The following candidates were elected: Ida Aalle-Teljo (SDP); Juho Aitamurto (SP); Evert Eloranta (SDP); Alexandra Gripenberg (SP); John Hedberg (SFP); Seth Heikkilä (SDP); Matti Helenius-Seppälä (KrTL); August Hjelt (SP); Aleksi Käpy (SP); Juho Kaskinen (NP); Dagmar Neovius (SFP); Juho Rannikko (SP); Vilhelm Rosenqvist (SFP); Albert Stigzelius (SFP); Julius Sundblom (SFP); Taavi Tainio (SDP); and Wäinö Wuolijoki (SDP).

===== 1907 =====
Results of the 1907 parliamentary election held on 15 and 16 March 1907:

Party		Votes	%	Seats
Finnish Party	SP	27,443	32.42%	6
Swedish People's Party of Finland	SFP	22,598	26.70%	5
Social Democratic Party of Finland	SDP	20,591	24.33%	4
Young Finnish Party	NP	7,225	8.54%	1
Christian Workers' Union of Finland	KrTL	5,011	5.92%	1
Others		1,776	2.10%	0
Valid votes		84,644	100.00%	17
Rejected votes		753	0.88%	
Total polled		85,397	80.32%	
Registered electors		106,316		

The following candidates were elected: Ida Aalle-Teljo (SDP); Alexandra Gripenberg (SP); Seth Heikkilä (SDP); Kaarlo Heininen (KrTL); August Hjelt (SP); Aleksi Käpy (SP); Karl Julian Karlsson (SFP); Kaarle Knuutila (SP); Antti Mikkola (NP); Dagmar Neovius (SFP); Juho Rannikko (SP); Vilhelm Rosenqvist (SFP); Oskar Schultz (SFP); Wilho Sipilä (SP); Julius Sundblom (SFP); Taavi Tainio (SDP); and Wäinö Wuolijoki (SDP).
