= Rannikko (surname) =

Rannikko (literally "coast, coastline") is a Finnish family name. Notable people with the surname include:

- Erkki Rannikko (1933–2010), Finnish lieutenant general
- Juho Rannikko (1873–1933), Finnish farmer and politician
- Teemu Rannikko (born 1980), Finnish basketball player
- Tuuli Rannikko (born 1947), Finnish author
