= Kaarlonen =

Kaarlonen is a surname. Notable people with the surname include:

- Katri Kaarlonen (1915–2008), Finnish politician
- Markus Kaarlonen (born 1973), Finnish musician
