= Sipilä =

Sipilä is a Finnish surname. Notable people with the surname include:

- Juha Sipilä (born 1961), Finnish politician
- Elis Sipilä (1887–1958), Finnish gymnast
- Helvi Sipilä (1915–2009), Finnish diplomat
- Jukka Sipilä (1936–2004), Finnish actor and director
- Markus Sipilä (born 1980), Finnish curler
- Tapio Sipilä (born 1958), Finnish wrestler
- Tauno Sipilä (1921–2001), Finnish cross-country skier
- Ulla Sipilä, Finnish ice hockey referee
- Väinö Sipilä (1897–1987), Finnish long-distance runner
- Wilho Sipilä (1858–1917), Finnish politician
