= Mikko Lundén =

Finnish politician

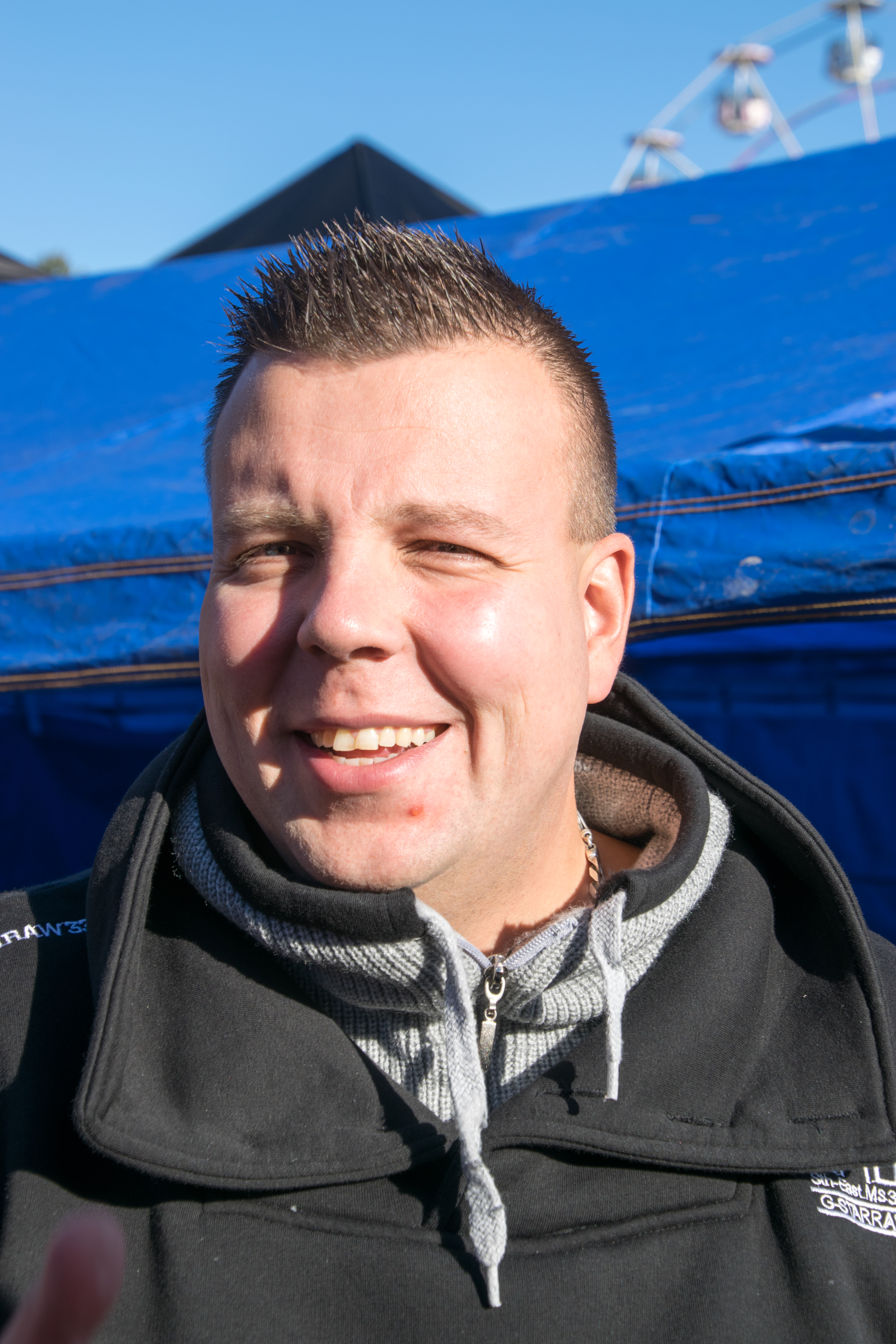

Member of the Finnish Parliament for Finland Proper

Personal details
- Party: Finns Party

Mikko Markus Lundén is a Finnish politician currently serving in the Parliament of Finland for the Finns Party at the Finland Proper constituency.
