= Iida Yrjö-Koskinen =

Finnish politician (1857–1937)

Freiherrin Iida Yrjö-Koskinen
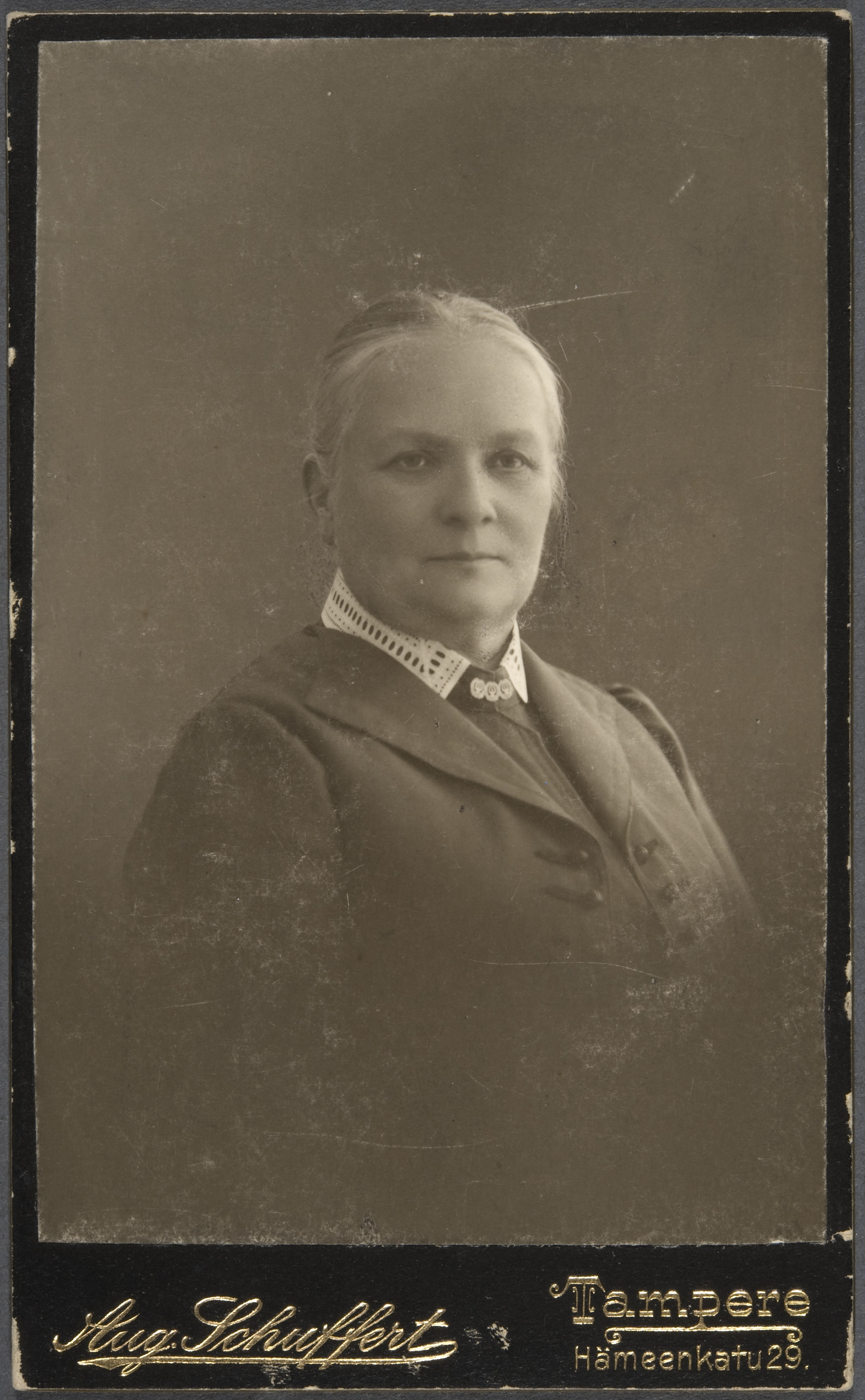
- Iida Yrjö-Koskinen c. 1914

Member of the Finnish Parliament
- In office 1909–1919
- Constituency: Turku Province (south)

Personal details
- Born: Iida Maria Fredrika Petander; 12 June 1857 Kuopion maalaiskunta, Grand Duchy of Finland
- Died: 18 March 1937 (aged 79) Helsinki, Finland
- Party: Finnish Party; National Coalition Party
- Spouse: Eino Sakari Yrjö-Koskinen (m. 1884; died 1916)
- Profession: Teacher, journalist

Iida Yrjö-Koskinen (née Petander; 1857–1937) was a Finnish politician, teacher and journalist, who served as a Member of the Parliament of Finland between 1909 and 1919, first representing the Finnish Party and later the National Coalition Party.

Her parliamentary career included the period leading to, and declaring, Finland's independence. She was also an elector in the 1925 Finnish presidential election.

Yrjö-Koskinen trained as a teacher, qualifying in 1879, and working for over 20 years as a teacher, first in Hämeenlinna and later in Tampere. In her later career she worked as a journalist. She dedicated her career to improving women's rights and education, and the welfare of underprivileged people.

In 1884, she married Freiherr Eino Sakari Yrjö-Koskinen, which gave her the noble title of Freiherrin (Finnish: Vapaaherratar).
