= Katja Taimela =

Finnish politician

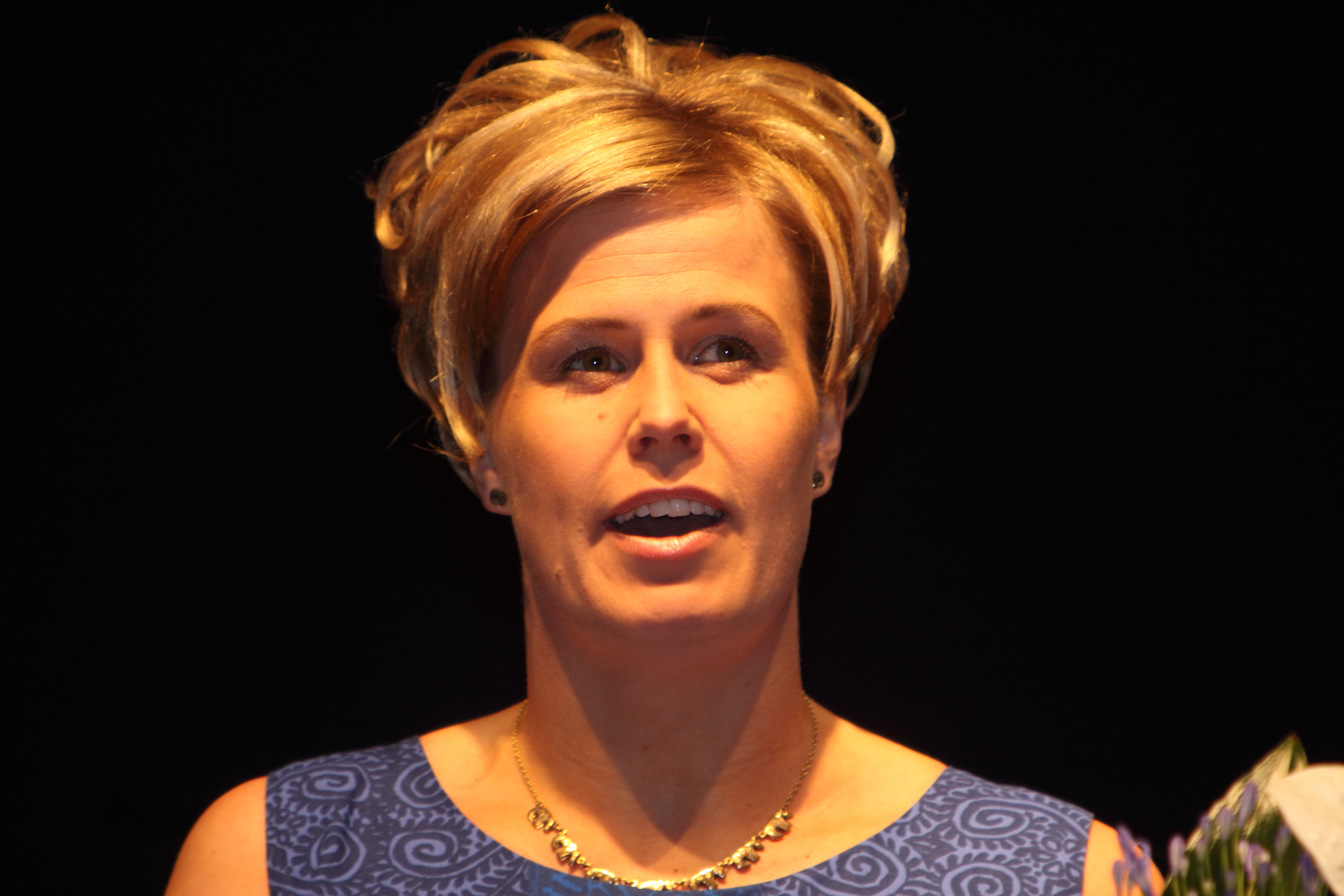

Member of the Finnish Parliament for Finland Proper

Personal details
- Born: 23 November 1974 (age 51) Vampula, Satakunta, Finland
- Party: Social Democratic Party of Finland

Katja Alli Maarit Taimela (born 23 November 1974 in Vampula) is a Finnish politician currently serving in the Parliament of Finland for the Social Democratic Party of Finland at the Finland Proper constituency.
