= Saara-Sofia Sirén =

Finnish politician

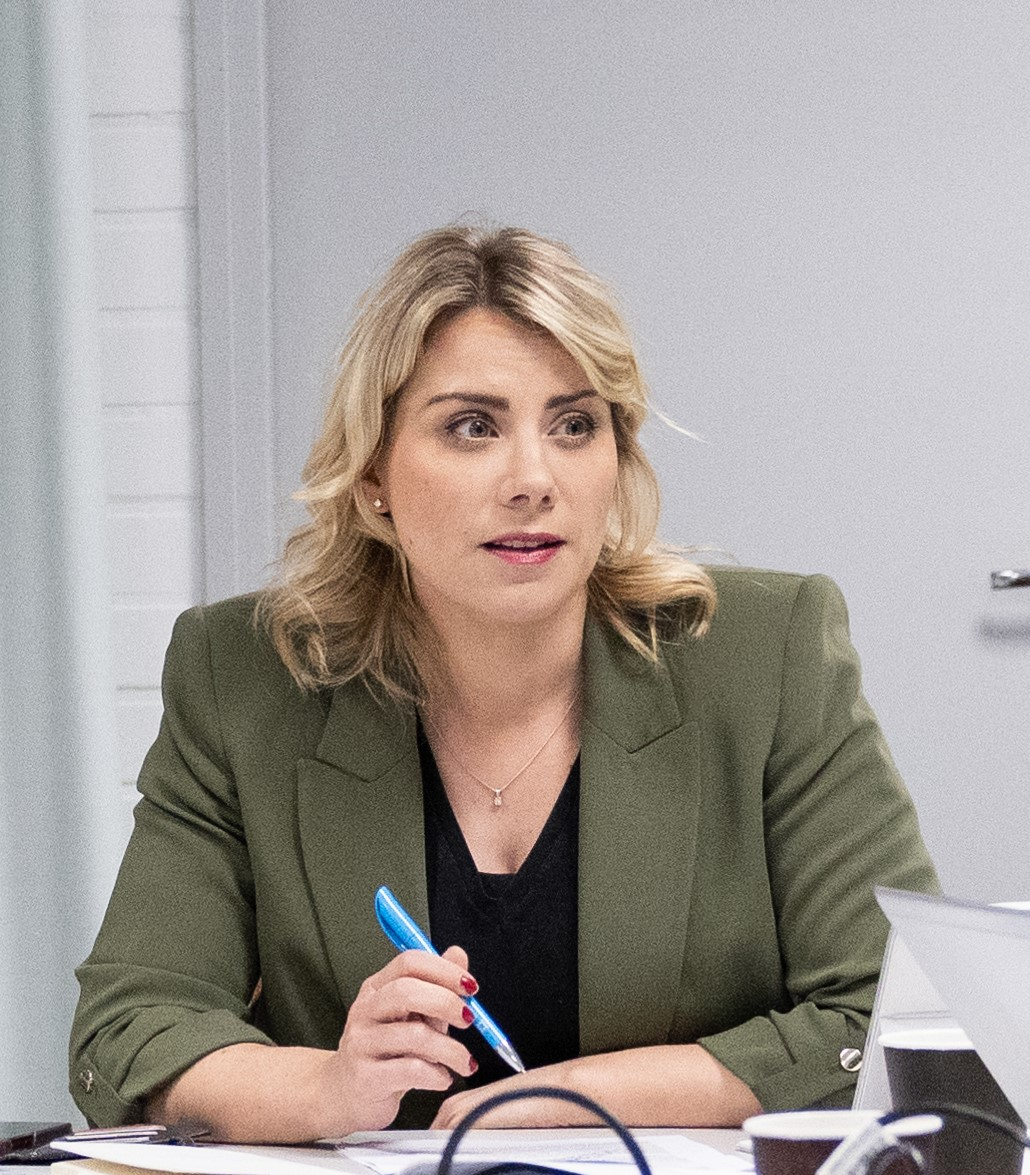

Member of the Finnish Parliament for Finland Proper

Personal details
- Born: 10 July 1986 (age 39) Mikkeli, Southern Savonia, Finland
- Party: National Coalition Party

Saara-Sofia Maria Sirén (born 10 July 1986 in Mikkeli) is a Finnish politician currently serving in the Parliament of Finland for the National Coalition Party at the Finland Proper constituency.
