= Aimo Laiho =

Finnish smallholder and politician (1914–2014)

Aimo Aleksi Laiho (6 January 1914 – 29 September 2014) was a Finnish smallholder and politician, born in Laitila. He was a member of the Parliament of Finland from 1962 until 1970, representing the Finnish People's Democratic League (SKDL). He was a member of the Central Committee of the Communist Party of Finland (SKP).
