= Aleksi Käpy =

Finnish jurist and politician (1871–1933)

Alfred Aleksi Käpy (21 July 1871 – 5 December 1933; surname until 1904 Alander) was a Finnish jurist and politician, born in Kankaanpää. He was a member of the Parliament of Finland from 1907 to 1909, representing the Finnish Party. He was the president of the Turku Court of Appeal from 1912 to 1925.
