= Sauli Hautala =

Finnish schoolteacher and politician (1927–2021)

Sauli Tuomas Hautala (2 March 1927 – 13 September 2021) was a Finnish schoolteacher and politician, born in Ylistaro. He was a member of the Parliament of Finland from 1975 to 1983 and again from 1987 to 1991, representing the Finnish Christian League (SKL). He was a presidential elector in the 1978 Finnish presidential election.
