= Yrjö Saarinen =

Finnish engineer and politician

Yrjö Reinhold Saarinen (22 October 1899, Hämeenlinna – 23 September 1977) was a Finnish engineer and politician. He was a member of the Parliament of Finland, representing the Patriotic People's Movement (IKL) from 1936 to 1944 and as an independent from 1944 to 1945, after the IKL was banned on 23 September 1944.
