= William Isaksson =

Finnish jurist and politician (1866–1924)

Karl William (K. W.) Isaksson (15 November 1866 – 31 March 1924) was a Finnish jurist and politician, born in Finström. He was a member of the Parliament of Finland from 1913 to 1917, representing the Swedish People's Party of Finland (SFP). He was the governor of Åland from 1918 to 1922.
