= August Hjelt =

Finnish politician

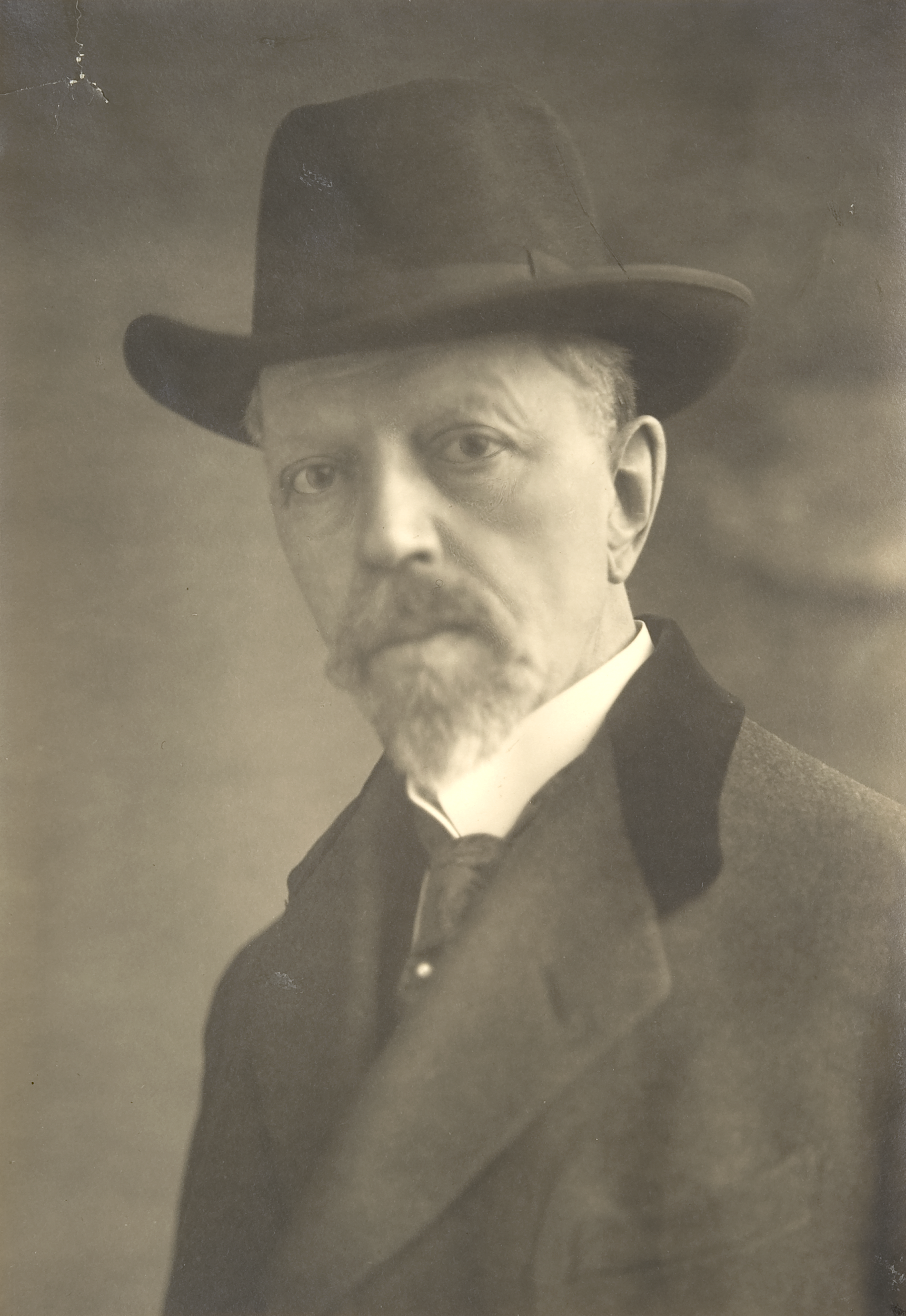
August Hjelt

August Johannes Hjelt (29 June 1862 in Tuusula – 12 July 1919 in Helsinki) was a Finnish politician. He was a member of the Senate of Finland. He belonged to the conservative Finnish Party. He was a member of the Diet of Finland in 1897 and from 1905 to 1906 and of the Parliament of Finland from 1907 to 1908 and again from 1910 to 1911. He was the younger brother of Edvard Hjelt.

== Publications ==
- Nils Nilson Idman, en finsk språk- och fornforskare under förra seklet (1882)
- Erik Lencqvist, en finsk präst och häfdeforskare i föregående århundradet (1886)
- Sveriges ställning till utlandet närmast efter 1772 års statshvälfning (1887)
- Yleisen valtiotiedon opas kansalaisille (1889)
- Nystads jernvägsfråga (1891)
- Sjuk-, begrafnings- och pensionskassor för arbetare och handtverkare i Finland (1891)
- Tapaturmat työssä Suonien eri ammateissa ynnä vertailuja Ruotsin, Norjan ja Saksan tapaturmaoloihin (1892)
- Die Arbeiter-Versicherung in Finnland (1899)
- De första officiela relationerna om svenska tabellverket åren 1749-1757 (1900)
- Det svenska tabellverkets uppkomst, organisation och tidigare verksamhet (1900)
- Rösträtten i Bondeståndet och inkomstförhållandena på landsbygden (1902)
- Rösträttsförhållandena i Borgareståndet och deras reformering (1902)
- Släkten Hjelt (1903)
- Den kommunala inkomstbeskattningen och inkomstförhållandena i Finland (1904-05)
