= Wilhelm Roos =

Finnish politician (1858–1944)

Samuel Wilhelm Roos (3 July 1858 - 10 December 1944) was a Finnish Lutheran clergyman and politician, born in Vehmaa. He was a member of the Diet of Finland from 1904 to 1906 and of the Parliament of Finland from 1909 to 1916 and again from 1917 to 1924, representing the Swedish People's Party of Finland (SFP).
