= Olavi Lähteenmäki =

Finnish Lutheran pastor and politician (1909–2006)

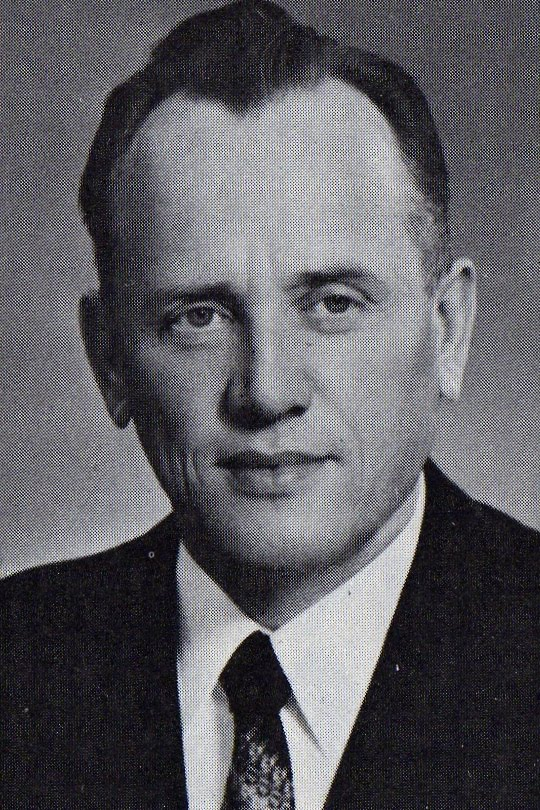
Olavi Lähteenmäki

Frans Olavi Lähteenmäki (13 July 1909 – 22 June 2006) was a Finnish Lutheran pastor and politician, born in Turku. He was a member of the Parliament of Finland from 1958 to 1975, representing the National Coalition Party. He was a presidential elector in the 1962 and 1968 presidential elections.
