= Gunnar Sahlstein =

Finnish jurist and politician (1879–1935)

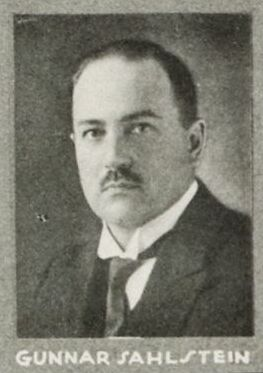
Gunnar Sahlstein

Georg Karl Gunnar Sahlstein (3 January 1879 – 10 January 1935) was a Finnish jurist and politician, born in Kuopio. He was a member of the Parliament of Finland from 1927 to 1933, representing the National Coalition Party. He served as Minister of the Interior from 2 June 1924 to 31 March 1925.
