= Urho Kulovaara =

Finnish politician

Urho Albinus Kulovaara (1 March 1889 – 15 June 1964) was a Finnish schoolteacher and politician, born in Kaarina. He was a Member of the Parliament of Finland, representing the Social Democratic Party of Finland (SDP) from 1930 to 1958, the Social Democratic Opposition from 1958 to 1959 and the Social Democratic Union of Workers and Smallholders (TPSL) from 1959 to 1962.
