= Konrad Lehtimäki =

Finnish journalist, writer and politician (1883–1937)

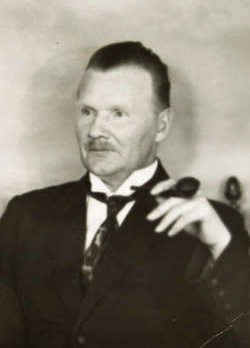
Konrad Lehtimäki in 1917

Konrad Vilhelm Lehtimäki (18 January 1883 – 25 May 1937) was a Finnish journalist, writer and politician, born in Vahto. He was a member of the Parliament of Finland from 1911 to 1917, representing the Social Democratic Party of Finland (SDP). He was imprisoned in 1918 for having sided with the Reds during the Finnish Civil War.
