= Pietari Kärnä =

Finnish schoolteacher, lay preacher and politician (1859–1930)

Pietari (Pekka) Kärnä (25 January 1859 – 16 October 1930) was a Finnish schoolteacher, lay preacher and politician, born in Nurmes. He was a member of the Parliament of Finland from 1911 until 1913, representing the Finnish Party.
