= Johannes Nyberg =

Finnish farmer and politician (1862–1931)

Johannes Julius (Joh.) Nyberg (31 December 1862 – 13 September 1931) was a Finnish farmer and politician, born in Nagu. He was a member of the Parliament of Finland from 1919 to 1924, representing the National Coalition Party.
