= Antti Mikkola =

Finnish lawyer, journalist and politician (1869–1918)

Anders Vilhelm (Antti Vilho) Mikkola (4 December 1869 – 1 February 1918) was a Finnish lawyer, journalist and politician, born in Lieto. He was a member of the Diet of Finland from 1904 to 1905 and from 1905 to 1906 and of the Parliament of Finland from 1907 to 1908, from 1909 to 1910 and from 1917 until his death in 1918 representing the Young Finnish Party. Shortly after the outbreak of the Finnish Civil War, being a prominent supporter of the White side, Mikkola was arrested by Red Guards and summarily executed.
