= Vappu Heinonen =

Finnish politician

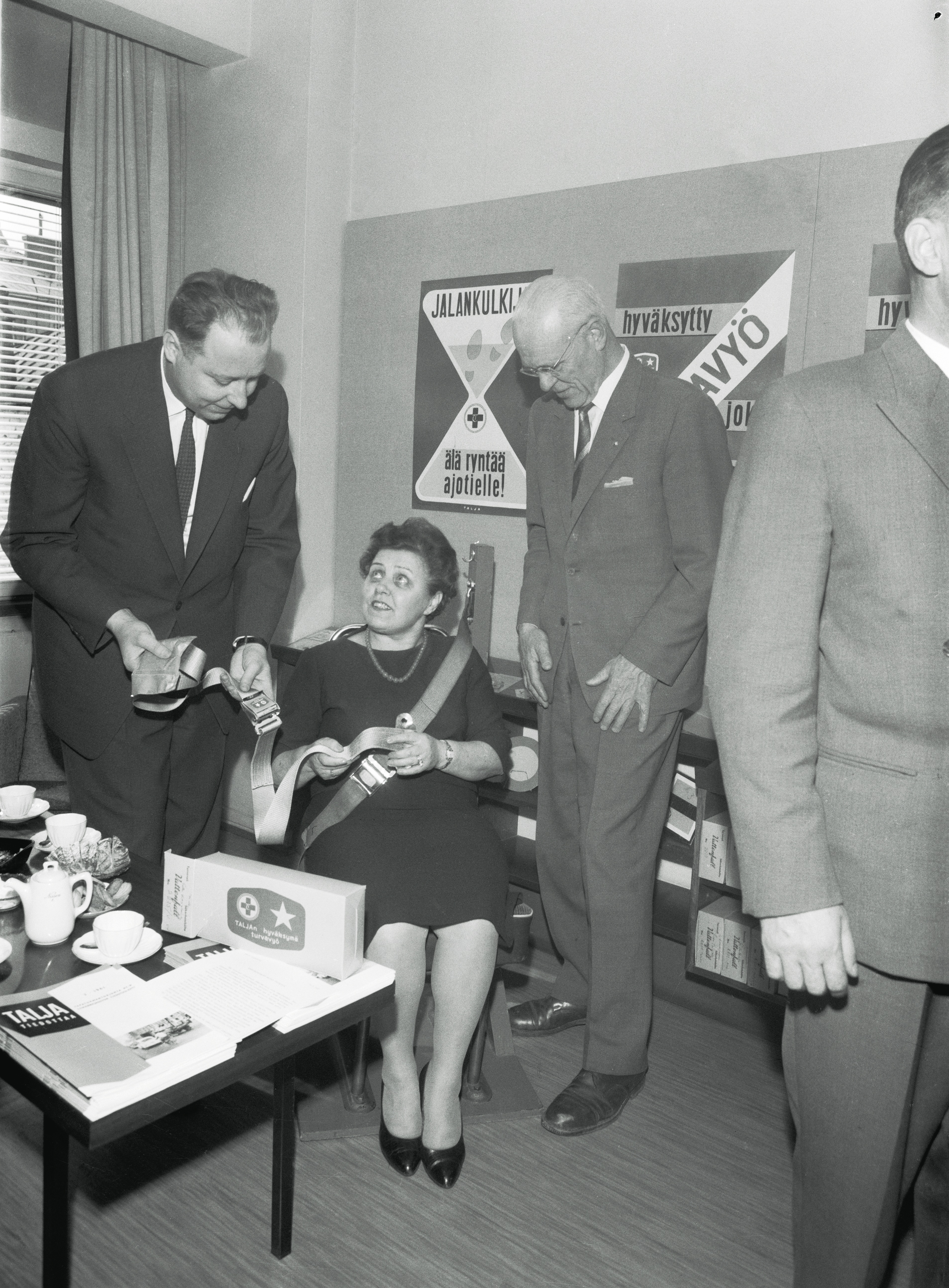
Vappu Heinonen, seated (May, 1961)

Vappu Linnea Heinonen (1 May 1905, Turku – 10 January 1999) was a Finnish social worker and politician. She was a member of the Parliament of Finland from 1951 to 1962 and from 1966 to 1970, representing first the Social Democratic Party of Finland (SDP), later the Social Democratic Union of Workers and Smallholders (TPSL).
