= Mauno Jussila =

Finnish farmer and politician (1908–1988)

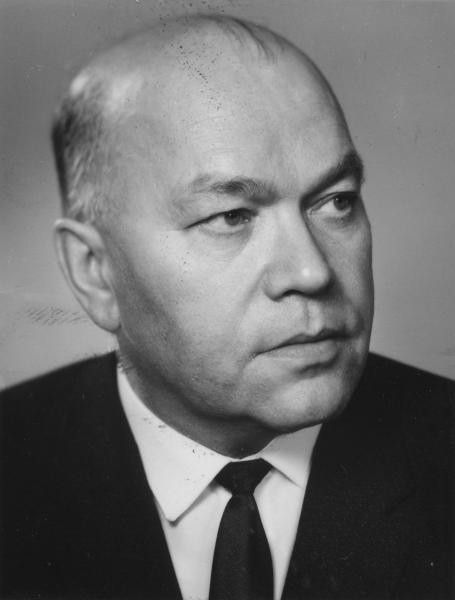

Deputy Minister of Finance
- In office 3 March 1956 to 27 May 1957; 29 August 1958 to 13 January 1958; 13 April 1962 to 13 December 1963

Deputy Minister of Social Affairs
- In office 14 August 1961 to 13 April 1962

Minister of Finance
- In office 13 December to 18 December 1963

Personal details
- Born: 15 August 1908
- Died: 3 November 1988 (aged 80)
- Party: Agrarian League
- Awards: Commander of the Order of the Lion of Finland; Medal of Liberty; Memorial medal of the Winter War; Memorial medal of the Continuation War; Cross of Merit of the Finnish Sports

Mauno Nikolai Jussila (15 August 1908 – 3 November 1988) was a Finnish farmer and politician, born in Vahto. He served as deputy minister of finance from 3 March 1956 to 27 May 1957 and from 29 August 1958 to 13 January 1958, as deputy minister of social affairs from 14 August 1961 to 13 April 1962, as deputy minister of finance from 13 April 1962 to 13 December 1963 and as minister of finance from 13 December to 18 December 1963. He was a member of the Parliament of Finland from 1951 to 1970, representing the Agrarian League, which renamed itself the Centre Party in 1965.
