= Mauno Kurppa =

Finnish politician

Mauno Johannes Kurppa (22 June 1927, in Loimaa – 30 January 1999) was a Finnish farmer, business executive and politician. He was a member of the Parliament of Finland, representing the Finnish Rural Party (SMP) from 1970 to 1972 and the Finnish People's Unity Party (SKYP) from 1972 to 1975.
