= Tauno Vartia =

Finnish politician

Tauno Ilmari Vartia (2 June 1907 in Sääksmäki – 8 February 1977) was a Finnish agronomist, farmer and politician. He was a member of the Parliament of Finland from 1966 to 1975, representing the National Coalition Party.
