= Juho Kaskinen =

Finnish politician (1865–1932)

Johannes (Juho) Kaskinen (30 December 1865 – 2 December 1932) was a Finnish farmer and politician. He was born in Lokalahti, and served as a Member of the Parliament of Finland, representing the Young Finnish Party from 1908 to 1910 and from 1911 to 1917 and the National Progressive Party from 1919 to 1922 and from 1930 until his death in 1932.
