= Eino Roine =

Finnish plumber and politician (1905–1987)

Eino Olavi Roine (8 December 1905 – 31 January 1987) was a Finnish plumber and politician, born in Turku. He was a member of the Parliament of Finland from 1945 to 1951, from 1954 to 1962 and from 1962 to 1966, representing the Finnish People's Democratic League (SKDL). He was a presidential elector in the 1950, 1956 and 1962 presidential elections. Roine was a member of the Communist Party of Finland (SKP). He joined the Communist Youth League in the 1920s, at a time when the SKP was still illegal in Finland. He was imprisoned for political reasons from 1930 to 1933 and again from 1941 to 1944. The Moscow Armistice of 19 September 1944 led to the legalization of the SKP. Roine recovered his liberty, resumed his political activities and was elected as a Member of Parliament six months after the armistice.
