= Waldemar Bergroth =

Finnish politician

Fredrik Waldemar Bergroth (14 May 1852, Humppila - 4 October 1928) was a Finnish Lutheran clergyman and politician. He was a member of the Parliament of Finland from 1917 to 1919 and again from 1922 to 1927, representing the Finnish Party until 1918 and the National Coalition Party thereafter.
