= Ida Aalle-Teljo =

Finnish politician

Ida Sofia Aalle-Teljo
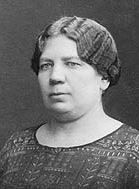
- Born: Ida Ahlstedt; 6 May 1875; Nurmijärvi
- Died: 17 June 1955 (aged 80)
- Occupation: Politician

Ida Sofia Aalle-Teljo (née Ahlstedt; 6 May 1875, Nurmijärvi - 17 June 1955) was a Finnish politician. She was a member of the Parliament of Finland from 1907 to 1917. During the Finnish Civil War, she was a member of the Central Workers' Council. When the Red side lost the war, she fled to Soviet Russia but returned to Finland in 1919, whereupon she was imprisoned from 1919 to 1922 because of her role in the administration of Red Finland.
