= Kalle Jokinen (politician, born 1900) =

Finnish worker and politician (1900–1965)

Kalle Nikolai Jokinen (26 December 1900 – 17 December 1965) was a Finnish farm hand, lumberjack, sailor and politician, born in Loimaa. He was a member of the Parliament of Finland from 1936 until 1958, representing the Social Democratic Party of Finland (SDP). He was a presidential elector in the 1937, 1940, 1943, 1950 and 1956 presidential elections. In 1918 he was imprisoned for having sided with the Reds during the Finnish Civil War.
