= Irma Karvikko =

Finnish journalist and politician

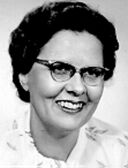
Irma Helena Karvikko

Irma Helena Karvikko (29 September 1909, in Turku – 16 September 1994; surname until 1933 Blomqvist) was a Finnish journalist and politician. She was Deputy Minister for Social Affairs from 17 November 1953 to 4 May 1954 and Minister for Social Affairs from 27 May to 1 September 1957. She was a member of the Parliament of Finland, representing the National Progressive Party from 1948 to 1951, the People's Party of Finland from 1951 to 1958 and from 1962 to 1965 and the Liberal People's Party from 1965 to 1970.
