= Janina Andersson =

Finnish politician (born 1971)

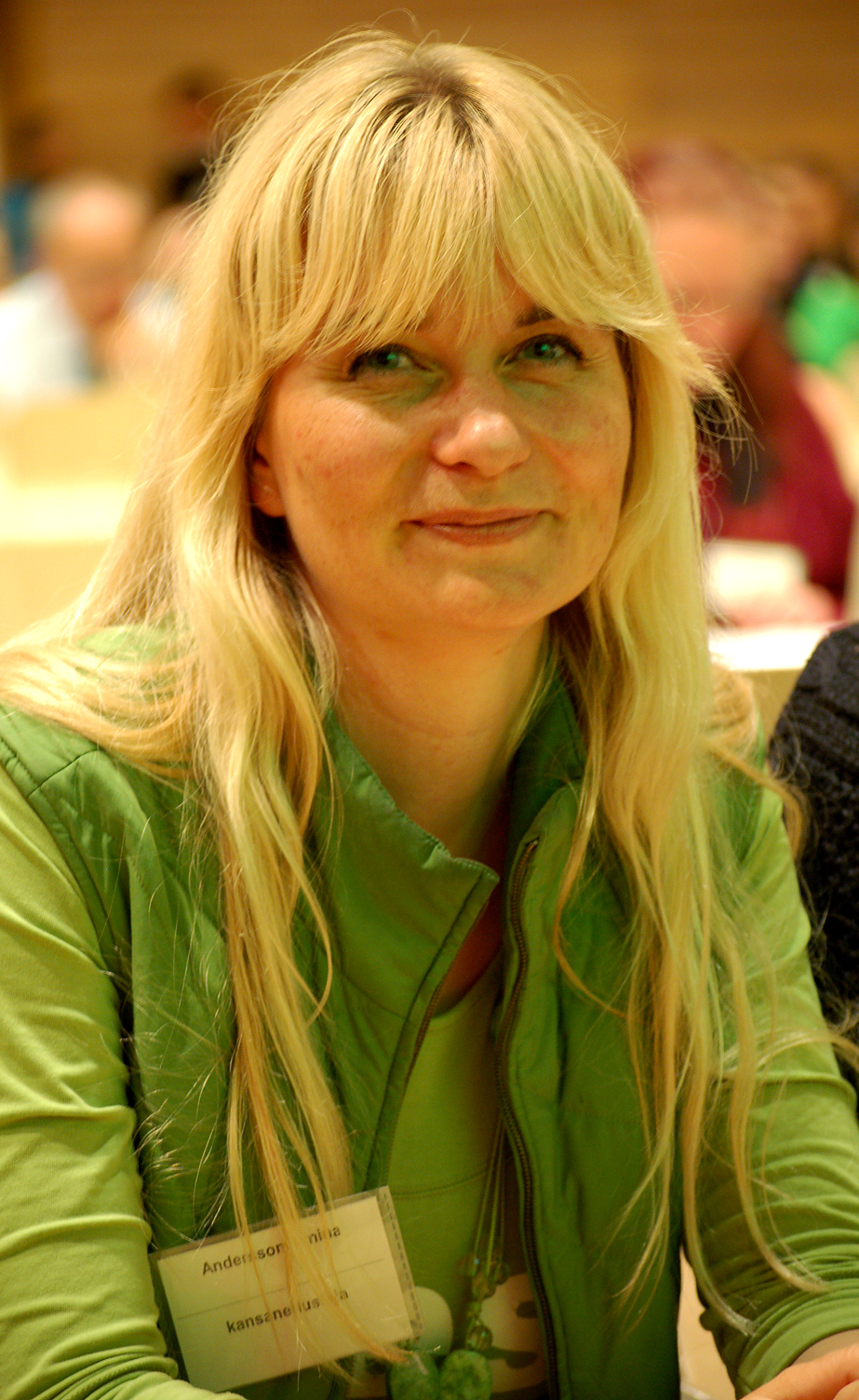
Janina Andersson

Janina Maria Andersson (born 28 February 1971) is a Finnish politician and former member of Finnish Parliament, representing the Green League. She has also held positions in various other organisations. She was first elected to the parliament in 1995 and served until 2011.

Andersson was born in Turku, Finland. She has a master's degree in political science from the Åbo Akademi. Andersson is married with two children.
