= Kaarle Knuutila =

Finnish politician

Kaarle Oskari Knuutila (7 December 1868, Vampula - 29 April 1949) was a Finnish farmer and politician. He was a member of the Parliament of Finland from 1907 to 1908 and again from 1910 to 1913, representing the Finnish Party.
