= Yrjö Helenius =

Finnish politician (1896–1964)

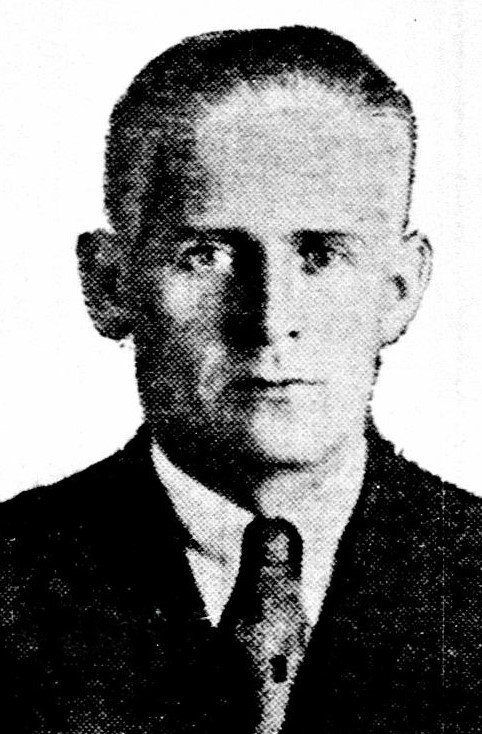
Member of the Parliament of Finland Yrjö Helenius (1896-1964).

Yrjö Mikael Helenius (21 January 1896 – 23 January 1964) was a Finnish politician, born in Keuruu. He was a member of the Parliament of Finland from 1936 to 1939 and from 1949 to 1951, representing the Social Democratic Party of Finland (SDP). He was a presidential elector in the 1937, 1940, 1943 and 1950 presidential elections.
