= Valentin Annala =

Finnish politician (1859–1926)

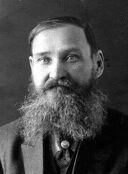
Valentin Annala

Valentin Annala (18 November 1859 in Ilmajoki – 19 October 1926) was a Finnish railway guard, noncommissioned officer and politician. He was a member of the Parliament of Finland from 1909 to 1918 and again from 1924 until his death in 1926, representing the Social Democratic Party of Finland (SDP). He was imprisoned from 1918 to 1919 for having sided with the Reds during the Finnish Civil War.
