= Karl Julian Karlsson =

Finnish schoolteacher and politician (1866–1911)

Karl Julian "K. J." Karlsson (5 January 1866 – 13 April 1911; original surname Eriksson) was a Finnish schoolteacher and politician, born in Västanfjärd. He was a member of the Diet of Finland from 1904 to 1905 and from 1905 to 1906 and of the Parliament of Finland from 1907 to 1908, representing the Swedish People's Party of Finland (SFP).
