= Esko Niskanen =

Finnish politician

Esko Antti Niskanen (14 September 1928 – 28 August 2013) was a Finnish politician, born in Nivala. He served as Deputy Minister of Finance from 4 September 1972 to 13 June 1975. Niskanen was a Member of the Parliament of Finland from 1966 to 1975, representing the Social Democratic Party of Finland (SDP).
