= Elviira Vihersalo =

Finnish politician (1871–1919)

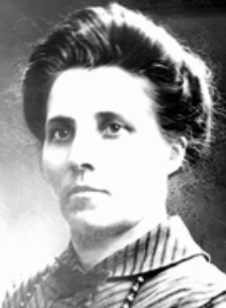
Elviira Vihersalo

Hedvig Elviira Vihersalo (29 January 1871 – 10 April 1919; née Ala-Rasku) was a Finnish politician, born in Ilmajoki. She was a member of the Parliament of Finland from 1913 to 1918, representing the Social Democratic Party of Finland (SDP). During the Finnish Civil War of 1918, she worked in the administration of the Finnish Socialist Workers' Republic. After the defeat of the Red side, she went into exile in Soviet Russia. She died of typhus in Petrograd in 1919.
