= Sylvi Siltanen =

Finnish politician (1909–1986)

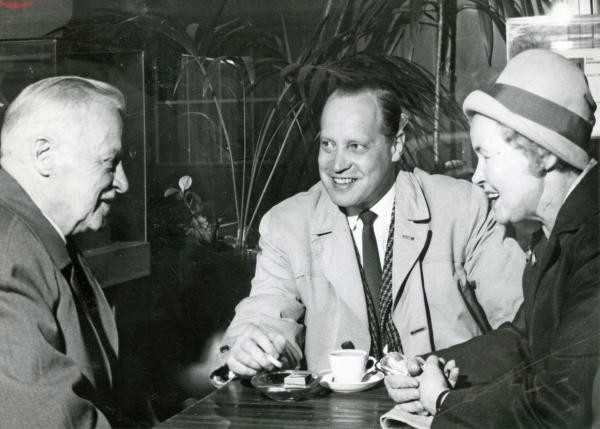
Finnish SDP-politicians in 1961: Väinö Tanner, Kaarlo Pitsinki and Sylvi Siltanen.

Sylvi Cecilia Siltanen (née Johansson; 22 November 1909, Ruotsinpyhtää – 8 December 1986, Turku) was a Finnish accountant and politician. She was a member of the Parliament of Finland from 1958 to 1972, representing the Social Democratic Party of Finland (SDP). She served as the governor of Turku and Pori Province from 1972 to 1977.
