= Urho Kähönen =

Finnish agronomist, civil servant and politician

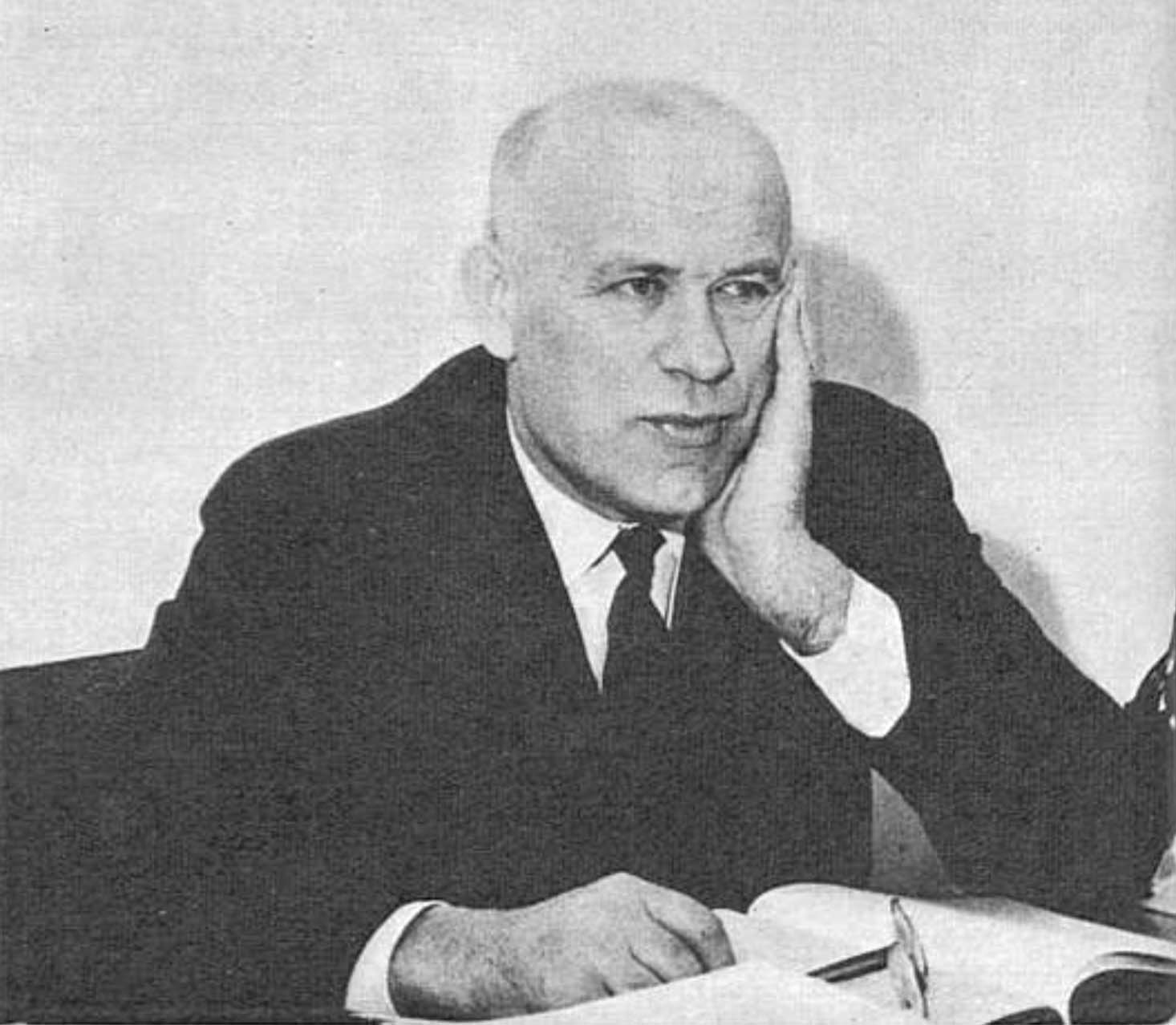
Urho Kähönen

Urho Kähönen (6 July 1910, Terijoki - 3 August 1984) was a Finnish agronomist, civil servant and politician. He served as Minister of Agriculture from 14 November 1958 to 13 January 1959. He was a member of the Parliament of Finland from 1951 to 1966, representing the Agrarian League (which changed its name to Centre Party in 1965).
