= Juho Aitamurto =

Finnish cantor, organist and politician (1860–1920)

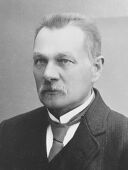
Juho Aitamurto

Johan August (Juho) Aitamurto (22 November 1860 – 27 February 1920; surname until 1906 Fagerström) was a Finnish cantor, organist and politician, born in Kisko. He was a member of the Parliament of Finland from 1908 to 1910 and from 1916 to 1917, representing the Finnish Party.
