= Mauri Perkonoja =

Finnish construction worker and politician (1902–1994)

Maurits (Mauri) Arvi Perkonoja (31 August 1902 – 29 June 1994) was a Finnish construction worker and politician, born in Paimio. He was a member of the Parliament of Finland from 1947 until 1951, representing the Finnish People's Democratic League (SKDL). He was a presidential elector in the 1950 Finnish presidential election.
