= Rafael Colliander =

Finnish politician (1878–1938)

Gustaf Rafael Colliander (19 April 1878 in Turku – 25 May 1938) was a Finnish journalist and politician. He was a member of the Parliament of Finland from 1909 to 1910, from 1917 to 1924, from 1927 to 1930 and from 1933 to 1938, representing the Swedish People's Party of Finland (SFP). Colliander was the secretary general of the SFP from 1920 to 1938.
