= Albert Stigzelius =

Finnish jurist and politician (1853–1928)

Erik Albert Stigzelius (8 March 1853 – 3 January 1928) was a Finnish jurist and politician, born in Korpo. He was a member of the Diet of Finland in 1894, 1897, 1899 and 1900 and of the Parliament of Finland from 1908 to 1909, representing the Swedish People's Party of Finland (SFP).
