= Edvard Kilpeläinen =

Finnish politician

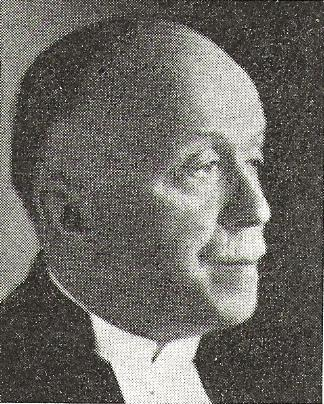
Edvard Kilpeläinen

Kaarle Edvard Kilpeläinen (4 October 1879 – 28 May 1941) was a Finnish Lutheran clergyman and politician, born in Nastola. He was Minister of Social Affairs from 21 March 1931 to 3 March 1932. He served as a Member of the Parliament of Finland, representing the Finnish Party from 1913 to 1916 and the National Coalition Party from 1922 to 1927, from 1929 to 1933 and again from 1936 to 1939.
