= Harras Kyttä =

Finnish politician (1912–1985)

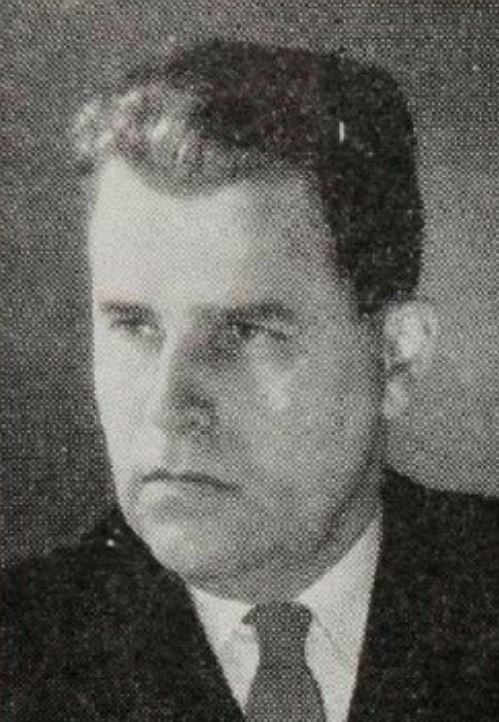
Harras Kyttä

Harras Vilhelm Johannes Kyttä (25 June 1912, Helsinki – 12 March 1985) was a Finnish jurist and politician. He served as Minister of the Interior from 27 May to 2 September 1957 and again from 26 April to 29 August 1958. Kyttä was a Member of the Parliament of Finland from 1951 to 1964, representing the People's Party of Finland.
