= Seth Heikkilä =

Finnish politician (1863–1938)

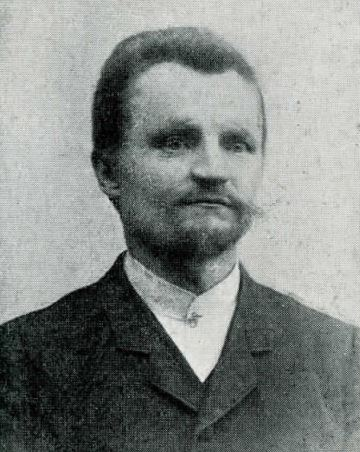
Seth Heikkilä (1909)

Seth Heikkilä (14 August 1863 – 27 July 1938) was a Finnish journalist, writer and politician, born in Multia. He was a Member of the Parliament of Finland from 1907 to 1909, from 1910 to 1911 and again from 1917 to 1918, representing the Social Democratic Party of Finland (SDP). In 1918, he was imprisoned for having sided with the Reds during the Finnish Civil War.
