= Inkeri Virtanen =

Finnish trade union official and politician (1921–1962)

Impi Inkeri Virtanen (23 June 1921 – 29 June 1962; née Lento) was a Finnish trade union official, political organizer and politician, born in Turku. She was a member of the Parliament of Finland from 1958 until her death in 1962, representing the Finnish People's Democratic League (SKDL).
