= Gottfrid Lindström =

Finnish politician

Johannes Gottfrid Lindström (8 August 1887 – 16 June 1975) was a Finnish industrial worker and politician, born in Dragsfjärd. He was a member of the Parliament of Finland from 1933 to 1945, representing the Social Democratic Party of Finland (SDP). During the Continuation War, he was among the signatories on the "Petition of the Thirty-three", which was presented to President Ryti on 20 August 1943 by members of the Peace opposition.
