= Jaakko Latvala =

Finnish cantor, schoolteacher and politician (1866–1931)

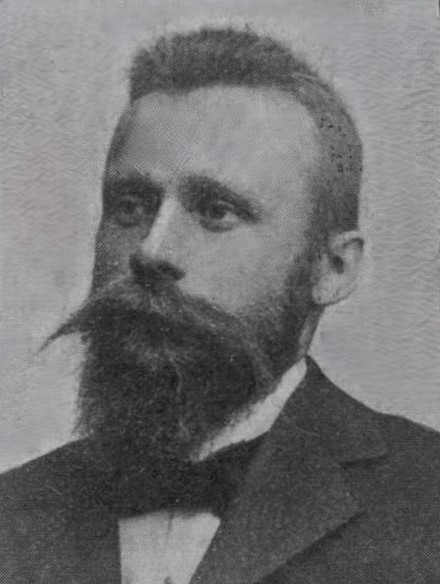
J. V. Latvala (1866-1931),

Jaakko Wilhelm (J. W.) Latvala (14 October 1866 – 7 February 1931) was a Finnish cantor, schoolteacher and politician, born in Prunkkala, Aura. He was a member of the Parliament of Finland from 1911 to 1913, from 1916 to 1918, from 1922 to 1924 and from 1927 to 1929, representing the Social Democratic Party of Finland (SDP). He was imprisoned in 1918 for having sided with the Reds during the Finnish Civil War.
