= Juho Pilppula =

Finnish schoolteacher and politician (1886–1973)

Juho Erland (J. Erl.) Pilppula (28 May 1886 – 14 February 1973) was a Finnish farmer, bank director and politician, born in Laitila. He was a member of the Parliament of Finland from 1927 to 1948, representing the Agrarian League. He served as Deputy Minister of Finance from 31 July 1940 to 4 January 1941. He was a presidential elector in the 1925 and 1931 presidential elections.
