= Einari Karvetti =

Finnish agronomist, farmer and politician (1897–1979)

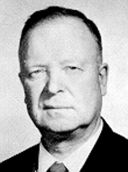
Einari Karvetti

Frans Einari Karvetti (16 April 1897 – 20 November 1979; surname until 1919 Karlström) was a Finnish agronomist, farmer and politician, born in Naantalin maalaiskunta. He was a member of the Parliament of Finland from 1933 until 1945, representing the Agrarian League (ML). He was a presidential elector in the 1937, 1940, 1943, 1956 and 1962 presidential elections.
