= Katri Kaarlonen =

Finnish politician (1915–2008)

Member of the Finnish Parliament
- In office 1966–1972
- Constituency: Turku Province (south)

Personal details
- Born: Katri Inkeri Kallio; 28 March 1915 Nivala, Grand Duchy of Finland
- Died: 1 October 2008 (aged 93) Perniö, Finland
- Party: Centre Party
- Parent: Kyösti Kallio (father)
- Profession: Teacher

Katri Kaarlonen (née Kallio; 28 March 1915 – 1 October 2008) was a Finnish politician, who served as a Member of Parliament for the Turku Province (south) constituency (now Varsinais-Suomi), representing the Centre Party.

She was a member of the electoral college in the 1962 and 1968 presidential elections, helping to re-elect her party's candidate, Urho Kekkonen.

Outside politics, Kaarlonen worked as a teacher of gardening, as well as running the family farm in Perniö. In 1985, she was granted the honorary title of Opetusneuvos (lit. 'Teaching counselor').

Her father was the 4th President of Finland, Kyösti Kallio. Her older sister Kerttu Saalasti was also a long-serving Member of Parliament, and one-time Minister of Education.
