= Vilhelm Rosenqvist =

Finnish politician

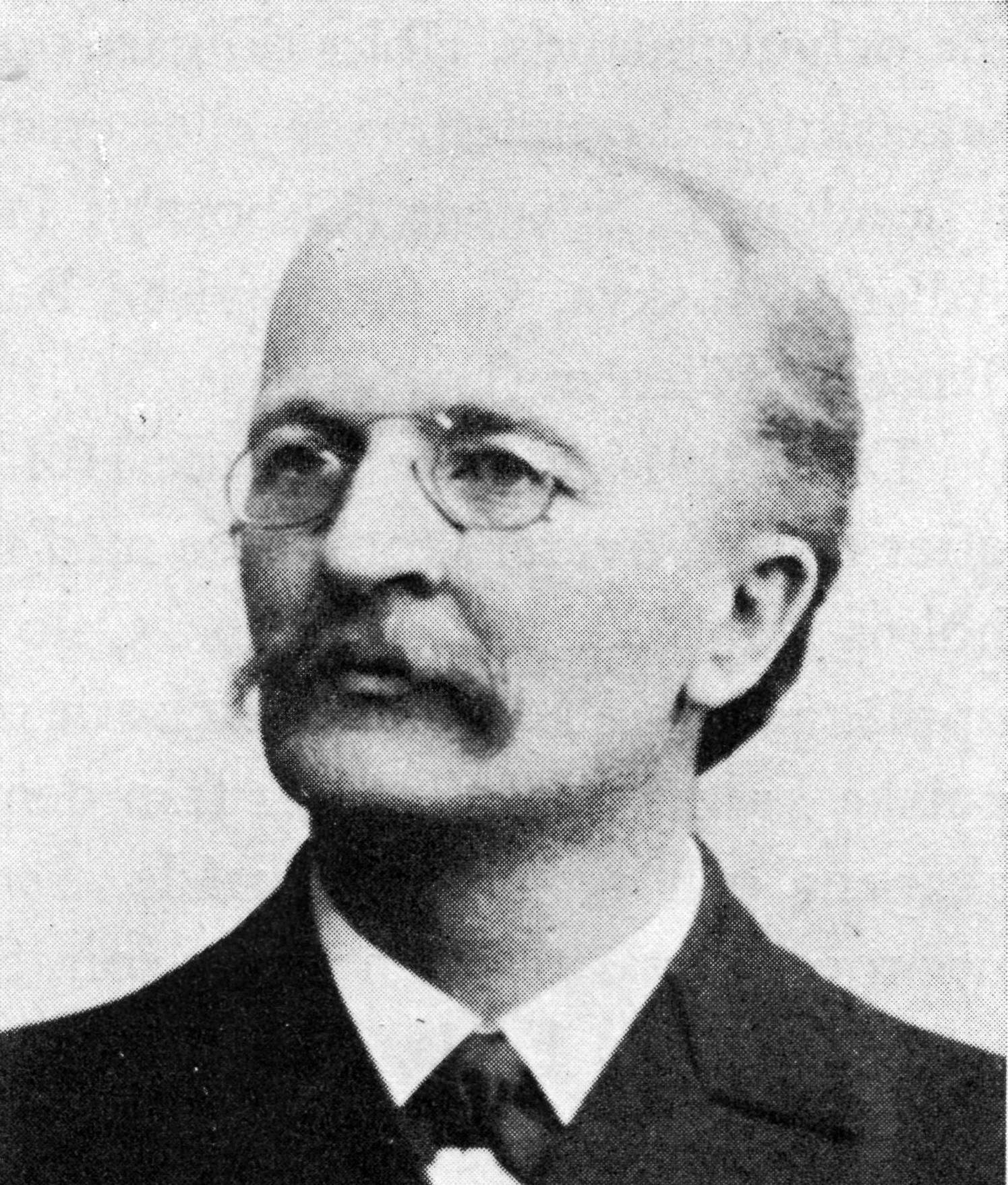
Vilhelm Teodor Rosenqvist

Vilhelm Teodor Rosenqvist (14 October 1856, in Lapinjärvi – 26 October 1925) was a Finnish secondary school teacher and politician. He was a member of the Diet of Finland from 1899 to 1906 and of the Parliament of Finland from 1907 to 1909, representing the Swedish People's Party of Finland (SFP). He was the younger brother of Gustaf Rosenqvist.

== Publications ==
- Om och ur bibeln. 1-2 (1889, 1895)
- Raamatusta. Esitelmiä ja kirjoitelmia (1899)
- I katekesfrågan (1891)
- Några antydningar om skolans uppfostrande verksamhet (1891)
- Utläggning af Johannes evangelium för hem och skola (1891)
- Biblisk historia för elementarläroverken (1892, 1897, 1915)
- Martin Luther, en kämpe för sanning och rätt (1900)
- Hjärtats längtan (1907)
- Gabriel Mauritz Waenerberg (1911)
- Svenska Normallyceum i Helsingfors 1864-1914 (1915)
- Vad Guds ord berättar (1915)
- Z. Topelii psalmdiktning (1917)
- Sagan om en gosse (1919)
- Vår svenska psalmbok (1919)
- Hedra din fader och din moder (1923)
- Frans Ludvig Schauman 1-2 (1927-28)
- Kyrkohistoria för flickskolor (1904)
- Kyrkohistoria för lyceer (1904)
