= Wilho Sipilä =

Finnish politician (1858–1917)

Frans Wilhelm (Wilho) Sipilä (7 August 1858, Vahto - 8 March 1917) was a Finnish Lutheran clergyman and politician. He was a member of the Parliament of Finland from 1907 to 1908 and again from 1909 to 1913, representing the Finnish Party.
