= Juho Rannikko =

Finnish politician

Juho Heikki Rannikko (17 September 1873 in Mietoinen – 15 November 1933) was a Finnish farmer and politician. He was a Member of the Parliament of Finland, representing the Finnish Party from 1907 to 1916 and the National Coalition Party from 1922 to 1927.
