= Koivisto I cabinet =

Government of Finland from 1968 to 1970

Koivisto I
- 51st Cabinet of Finland
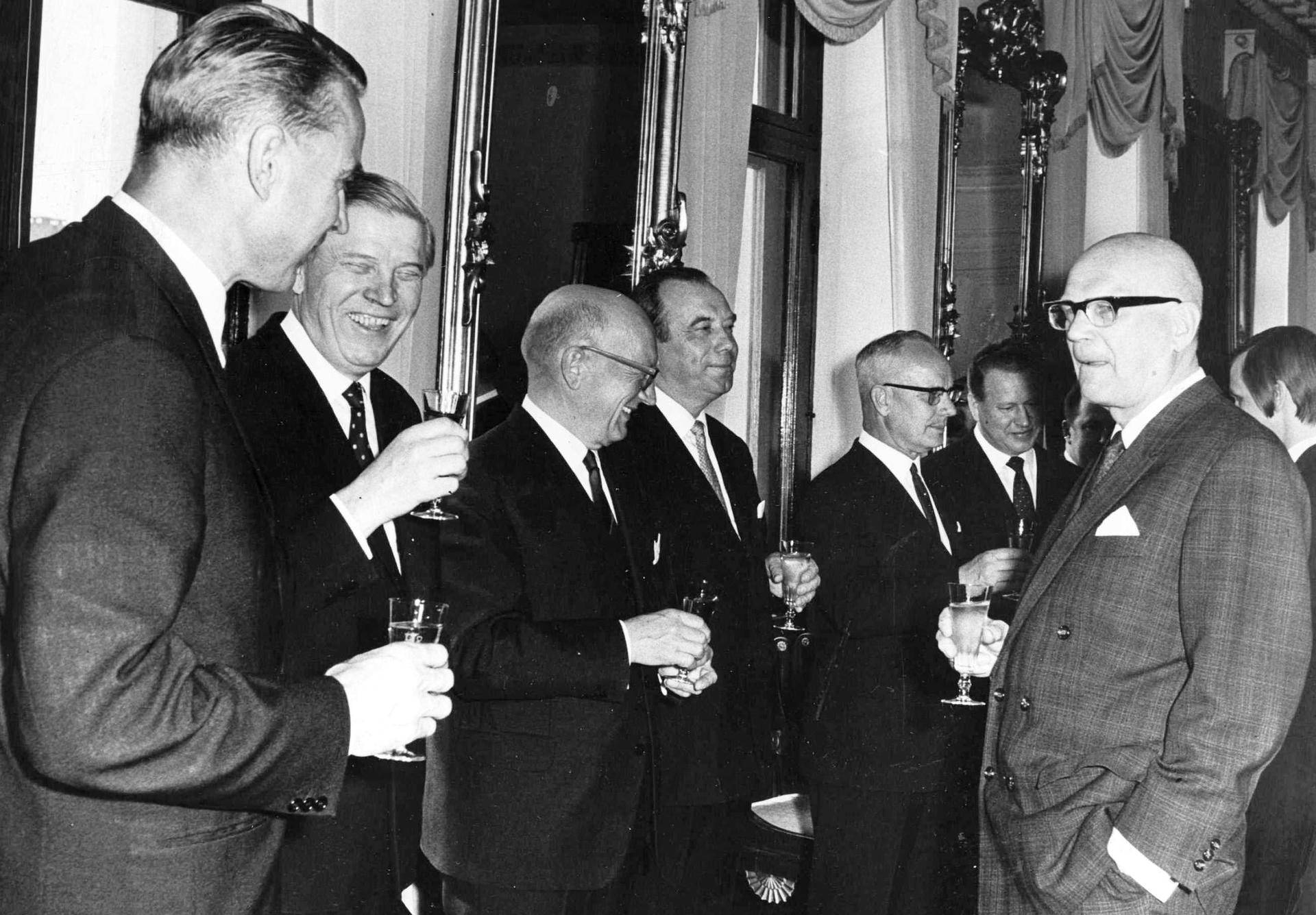
- Koivisto I Cabinet, resigning, with Pres. Urho Kekkonen (right). Others from the left: M. Koivisto, J. Virolainen, M. Miettunen, V. Leskinen, G. Teir & S. Suorttanen
- Date formed: 22 March 1968
- Date dissolved: 14 May 1970

People and organisations
- Prime Minister: Mauno Koivisto
- Member parties: SDP; Centre Party; SKDL; TPDL; RKP
- Status in legislature: Majority government

History
- Predecessor: Paasio I
- Successor: Aura I

Mauno Koivisto's cabinet was the 51st government of Finland, which lasted from 22 March 1968 to 14 May 1970. It was a majority government which was based on the popular front model. The Prime Minister of the cabinet was Mauno Koivisto of the Social Democratic Party.

Paasio's cabinet made lot of political reforms; pension laws, family laws, farmers and entrepreneur pension laws and liberating lower alcohol beer sales.

Assembly
Minister	Period of office	Party
Prime Minister; Mauno Koivisto	22 March 1968 – 14 May 1970	Social Democratic Party
Deputy Prime Minister; Johannes Virolainen	22 March 1968 – 14 May 1970	Centre Party
Minister at Council of State; Jussi Linnamo; Margit Eskman	22 March 1968 – 14 May 1970; 1 February 1970 – 14 May 1970	Centre Party
Minister of Foreign Affairs; Ahti Karjalainen	22 March 1968 – 14 May 1970	Centre Party
Minister of Justice; Aarre Simonen	22 March 1968 – 14 May 1970	Social Democratic Union of Workers and Smallholders
Minister of the Interior; Antero Väyrynen	22 March 1968 – 14 May 1970	Social Democratic Party
Minister of Defence; Sulo Suorttanen	22 March 1968 – 14 May 1970	Centre Party
Minister of Finance; Eino Raunio	22 March 1968 – 14 May 1970	Social Democratic Party
Minister of Education; Johannes Virolainen	22 March 1968 – 14 May 1970	Centre Party
Minister of Agriculture; Martti Miettunen	22 March 1968 – 14 May 1970	Centre Party
'Minister of Transport and Public Works; Paavo Aitio	22 March 1968 – 14 May 1970	People's Democratic League (minority)
Minister of Transport; Paavo Aitio	1 March 1970 – 14 May 1970	People's Democratic League (minority)
Minister of Trade and Industry; Grels Teir	22 March 1968 – 14 May 1970	Swedish People's Party
Minister of Social Affairs; Anna-Liisa Tiekso	22 March 1968 – 14 May 1970	People's Democratic League
Deputy Minister of Transport and Public Works; Viljo Virtanen; Veikko Helle	22 March 1968 – 31 December 1969; 1 January 1970 – 28 February 1970	Social Democratic Party
Minister of Labour; Veikko Helle	1 May 1970 – 14 May 1970	Social Democratic Party
Deputy Minister of Trade and Industry; Väinö Leskinen	22 March 1968 – 14 May 1970	Social Democratic Party
Deputy Minister of Social Affairs; Eemil Partanen	2 April 1968 – 14 May 1970	Centre Party
Deputy Minister of Finance; Ele Alenius	22 March 1968 – 14 May 1970	People's Democratic League

Preceded by Paasio I Cabinet	Cabinet of Finland; 22 March 1968 to 14 May 197	Succeeded by Aura I Cabinet
