= Aura II cabinet =

Aura II Cabinet
- 54th Cabinet of Finland
- Date formed: 29 October 1971
- Date dissolved: 23 February 1972

People and organisations
- President: Urho Kekkonen
- Prime Minister: Teuvo Aura
- Status in legislature: Caretaker government

History
- Predecessor: Karjalainen II
- Successor: Paasio II

Teuvo Aura's second cabinet was the 54th government of Finland, which existed from 29 October 1971 to 23 February 1972. It was a caretaker government whose Prime Minister was Teuvo Aura.

== Ministers ==
Portfolio	Minister	Took office	Left office	Party
Prime Minister	Teuvo Aura	29 October 1971	23 February 1972	none
Minister deputising for the Prime Minister	Päiviö Hetemäki	29 October 1971	23 February 1972	none
Minister at the Prime Minister's Office	Esa Timonen	29 October 1971	23 February 1972	none
Minister for Foreign Affairs	Olavi J. Mattila	29 October 1971	23 February 1972	none
Minister at the Ministry for Foreign Affairs	Reino Rossi	29 October 1971	23 February 1972	none
Minister of Justice	K. J. Lång	29 October 1971	23 February 1972	none
Minister of the Interior	Heikki Tuominen	29 October 1971	23 February 1972	none
Minister of Defence	Arvo Pentti	29 October 1971	23 February 1972	none
Minister of Finance	Päiviö Hetemäki	29 October 1971	23 February 1972	none
Minister at the Ministry of Finance	Jorma Uitto	29 October 1971	23 February 1972	none
Minister of Education	Matti Louekoski	29 October 1971	23 February 1972	none
Minister at the Ministry of Education	Jouko Tyyri	29 October 1971	23 February 1972	none
Minister of Agriculture and Forestry	Samuli Suomela	29 October 1971	23 February 1972	none
Minister of Transport	Esa Timonen	29 October 1971	23 February 1972	none
Minister of Trade and Industry	Gunnar Korhonen	29 October 1971	23 February 1972	none
Minister at the Ministry of Trade and Industry	Reino Rossi	29 October 1971	23 February 1972	none
Minister of Social Affairs and Health	Alli Lahtinen	29 October 1971	23 February 1972	none
Minister at the Ministry of Social Affairs and Health	Gunnar Korhonen	29 October 1971	23 February 1972	none
Minister of Labour	Keijo Liinamaa	29 October 1971	23 February 1972	none

Preceded by Karjalainen II Cabinet	Cabinet of Finland; 29 October 1971 – 23 February 1972	Succeeded by Paasio II Cabinet
