= Miettunen III cabinet =

Government of Finland from 1976 to 1977

Miettunen III Cabinet
- 59th Cabinet of Finland
- Date formed: 29 September 1976
- Date dissolved: 15 May 1977

People and organisations
- Prime Minister: Martti Miettunen
- Member parties: Centre Party; Liberal People's Party; RKP
- Status in legislature: Minority government

History
- Predecessor: Miettunen II
- Successor: Sorsa II

The third cabinet of Martti Miettunen was the 59th government of Finland. The government existed from 29 September 1976 to 15 May 1977. It was a minority government formed by the Centre Party, the Swedish People’s Party, and the Liberal People’s Party. The cabinet had economic problems to solve during the aftershock of the 1973 oil crisis.

== Ministers ==
Minister	Period of office	Party
Prime Minister; Martti Miettunen	29 September 1976 – 15 May 1977	Centre Party
Deputy Prime Minister; Ahti Karjalainen	29 September 1976 – 15 May 1977	Centre Party
Minister at Council of State; Ahti Karjalainen	29 September 1976 – 15 May 1977	Centre Party
Minister of Foreign Affairs; Keijo Korhonen	29 September 1976 – 15 May 1977	Centre Party
Deputy Minister of Foreign Affairs; Carl Göran Aminoff	12 December 1975 – 29 September 1976	Swedish People's Party
Minister of Justice; Kristian Gestrin	29 September 1976 – 15 May 1977	Swedish People's Party
Minister of the Interior; Eino Uusitalo	29 September 1976 – 15 May 1977	Centre Party
Minister of Defence; Seppo Westerlund	29 September 1976 – 15 May 1977	Liberal People's Party
Minister of Finance; Esko Rekola	29 September 1976 – 15 May 1977	Independent
Deputy Minister of Finance; Jouko Loikkanen	29 September 1976 to 15 May 1977	Centre Party
Minister of Education; Paavo Väyrynen	29 September 1976 – 15 May 1977	Centre Party
Deputy Minister of Education; Marjatta Väänänen	29 September 1976 – 15 May 1977	Centre Party
Minister of Agriculture and Forestry; Johannes Virolainen	29 September 1976 – 15 May 1977	Centre Party
Minister of Traffic; Ragnar Granvik	29 September 1976 – 15 May 1977	Swedish People's Party
Minister of Trade and Industry; Arne Berner	29 September 1976 – 15 May 1977	Liberal People's Party
Deputy Minister of Trade and Industry; Carl Göran Aminoff	12 December 1975 – 29 September 1976	Swedish People's Party
Minister of Social Affairs and Health; Irma Toivanen	29 September 1976 – 15 May 1977	Liberal People's Party
Deputy Minister of Social Affairs and Health; Orvokki Kangas	29 September 1976 – 15 May 1977	Centre Party
Minister of Labour; Paavo Väyrynen	29 September 1976 – 15 May 1977	Centre Party

Preceded by Miettunen II Cabinet	Cabinet of Finland; 29 September 1976 to 15 May 1977	Succeeded by Sorsa II Cabinet
