= Aura I cabinet =

Caretaker government of Finland from 14 May 1970 to 15 July 1970

Aura I Cabinet
- 52nd Cabinet of Finland
- Date formed: 14 May 1970
- Date dissolved: 15 July 1970

People and organisations
- President: Urho Kekkonen
- Prime Minister: Teuvo Aura
- Status in legislature: Caretaker government

History
- Predecessor: Koivisto I
- Successor: Karjalainen II

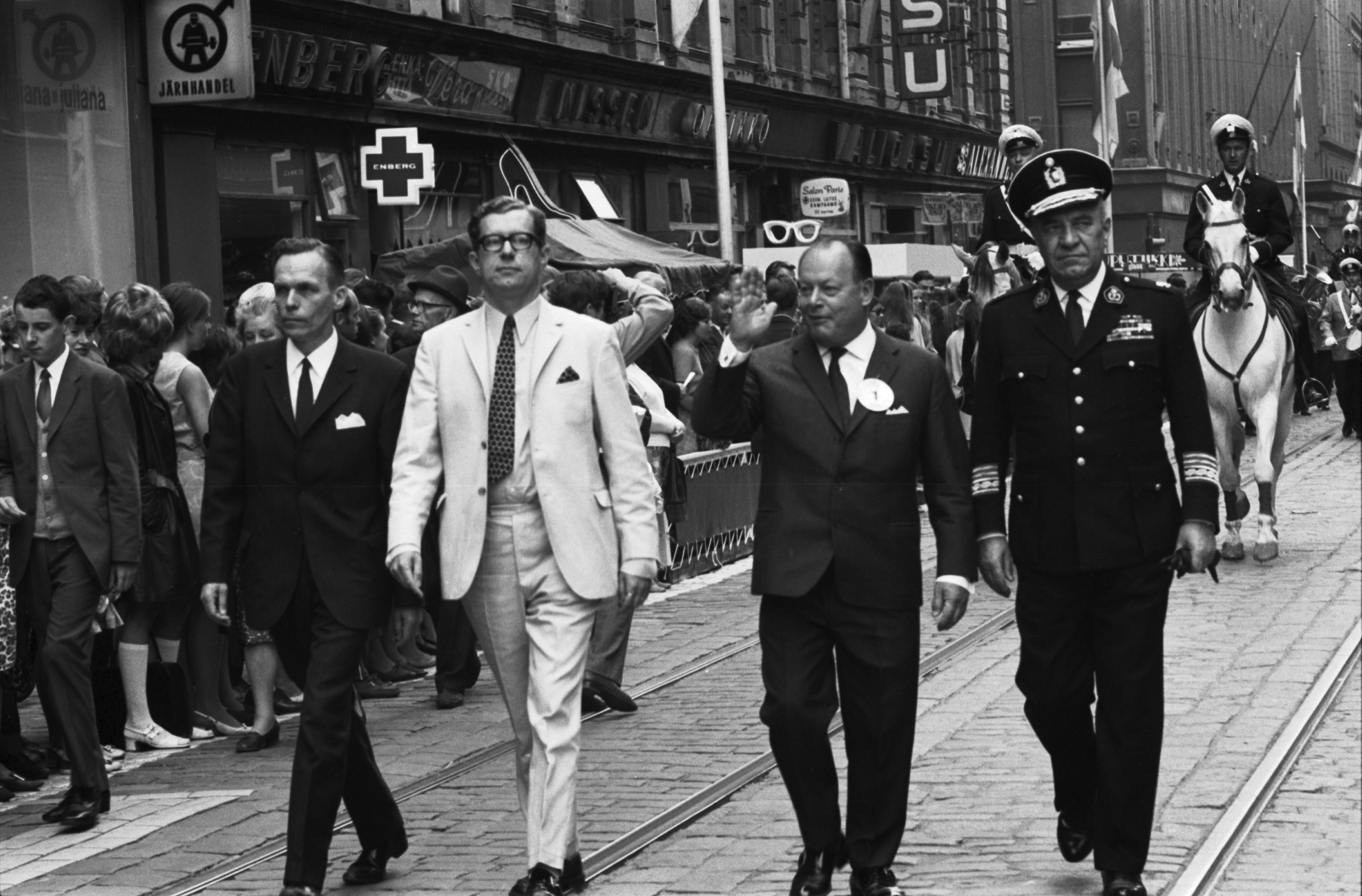
Prime Minister Teuvo Aura (third from the left) and city councillor Panu Toivonen (second from the left) at the opening parade in June 1970 when Aleksanterinkatu street in Helsinki was temporarily reserved for pedestrians only. (Photograph by Eeva Rista)

Teuvo Aura's first cabinet was a caretaker government of Finland, led by Teuvo Aura (lib.). The cabinet governed for two months, from 14 May 1970 to 15 July 1970 in the interregnum between Mauno Koivisto's first cabinet and Ahti Karjalainen's second cabinet. It did not produce a government platform.

== Ministers ==
Portfolio	Minister	Took office	Left office	Party
Prime Minister	Teuvo Aura	14 May 1970	15 July 1970	none
Minister deputising for the Prime Minister	Päiviö Hetemäki	14 May 1970	15 July 1970	none
Minister for Foreign Affairs	Väinö Leskinen	14 May 1970	15 July 1970	none
Minister of Justice	Keijo Liinamaa	14 May 1970	15 July 1970	none
Minister of the Interior	Teemu Hiltunen	14 May 1970	15 July 1970	none
Minister of Defence	Arvo Pentti	14 May 1970	15 July 1970	none
Minister of Finance	Päiviö Hetemäki	14 May 1970	15 July 1970	none
Minister at the Ministry of Finance	Keijo Liinamaa	14 May 1970	15 July 1970	none
Minister of Education	Jaakko Numminen	14 May 1970	15 July 1970	none
Minister of Agriculture	Nils Westermarck	14 May 1970	15 July 1970	none
Minister of Transport	Martti Niskala	14 May 1970	15 July 1970	none
Minister of Trade and Industry	Olavi J. Mattila	14 May 1970	15 July 1970	none
Minister of Social Affairs and Health	Gunnar Korhonen	14 May 1970	15 July 1970	none
Minister at the Ministry of Social Affairs and Health	Alli Lahtinen	14 May 1970	15 July 1970	none
Minister of Labour	Esa Timonen	14 May 1970	15 July 1970	none

Preceded by Koivisto I Cabinet	Cabinet of Finland; 14 May 1970 – 15 July 1970	Succeeded by Karjalainen II Cabinet
