= Sorsa I cabinet =

Sorsa I Cabinet
- 56th Cabinet of Finland
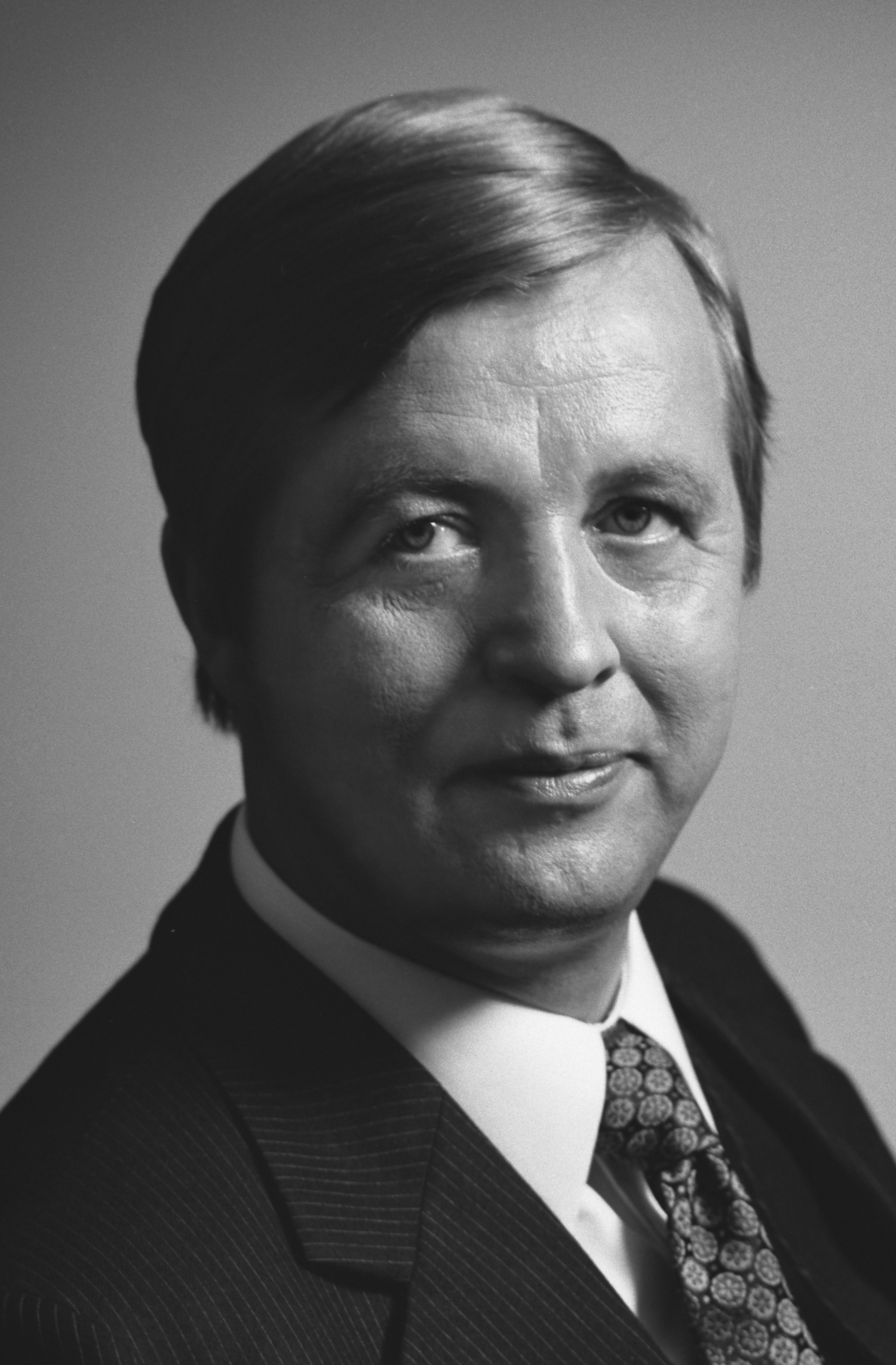
- Date formed: 4 September 1972
- Date dissolved: 13 June 1975
- President: Urho Kekkonen
- Prime Minister: Kalevi Sorsa
- Member parties: SDP; Centre Party; RKP; Liberal People's Party

History
- Election: 1972 parliamentary election
- Predecessor: Paasio II
- Successor: Liinamaa

The first cabinet of Kalevi Sorsa was the 56th government of Finland. The cabinet's Prime Minister was Kalevi Sorsa. The cabinet was in office from 4 September 1972 to 13 June 1975.

President Urho Kekkonen dissolved the government and the Parliament on 13 June 1975 and called a new parliamentary election during the same year.

The Sorsa Cabinet started its term during a time of economic growth for Finland. This allowed the government to make social reforms to pension and public health. The Sorsa government made plans for investments to industry, including those relating to the Loviisa Nuclear Power Plant. Due to the financial issues caused by the 1973 Middle East Oil Crisis, these plans were delayed. The government also had to control foreign capital exchange.

== Ministers ==
Portfolio	Minister	Took office	Left office	Party
Prime Minister	Kalevi Sorsa	4 September 1972	13 June 1975	SDP
Deputy Prime Minister	Ahti Karjalainen	4 September 1972	13 June 1975	Centre
Minister of Foreign Affairs
Minister of Foreign Affairs	Ahti Karjalainen	4 September 1972	13 June 1975	Centre
Deputy Minister of Foreign Affairs	Jussi Linnamo	4 September 1972	5 May 1973	SDP
Deputy Minister of Foreign Affairs	Jermu Laine	5 May 1973	13 June 1975	SDP
Minister of Justice	Matti Louekoski	4 September 1972	13 June 1975	SDP
Minister of the Interior	Heikki Tuominen	4 September 1972	13 June 1975	Independent
Minister of Defence	Kristian Gestrin	4 September 1972	30 September 1974	RKP
Minister of Defence	Carl-Olaf Homén	1 October 1974	3 June 1975	RKP
Minister of Finance	Johannes Virolainen	4 September 1972	13 June 1975	Centre
Deputy Minister of Finance	Esko Niskanen	4 September 1972	30 September 1974	SDP
Deputy Minister of Finance	Heikki Tuominen	30 September 1974	13 June 1975	Independent
Minister of Justice	Ulf Sundqvist	4 September 1972	31 May 1974	SDP
Minister of Justice	Varma Kallio	1 June 1974	9 September 1974	SDP
Minister of Justice	Ulf Sundqvist	9 September 1974	13 June 1975	SDP
Minister of Agriculture and Forestry	Erkki Haukipuro	14 September 1972	31 July 1973	Centre
Minister of Agriculture and Forestry	Heimo Linna	1 August 1973	13 June 1975	Centre
Minister of Trade and Industry	Grels Teir	4 September 1972	31 December 1972	RKP
Minister of Trade and Industry	Jan-Magnus Jansson	1 January 1973	30 September 1974	RKP
Minister of Trade and Industry	Kristian Gestrin	1 October 1974	13 June 1975	RKP
Minister of Social Affairs	Seija Karkinen	4 September 1972	13 June 1975	SDP
Minister of Transport and Communications	Pekka Tarjanne	4 September 1972	13 June 1975	Liberals
Minister of Labour	Valde Nevalainen	4 September 1972	13 June 1975	SDP
Deputy Minister of Social Affairs	Pentti Pekkarinen	4 September 1972	20 January 1975	Centre
Deputy Minister of Social Affairs	Reino Karpola	7 February 1975	13 June 1975	Centre
Deputy Minister of Trade and Industry and Foreign Trade	Jussi Linnamo	4 September 1972	5 May 1973	SDP
Deputy Minister of Trade and Industry and Foreign Trade	Jermu Laine	5 May 1973	13 June 1975	SDP
Deputy Minister of Education	Marjatta Väänänen	4 September 1972	13 June 1975	Centre
Deputy Minister of Finance	Esko Niskanen	4 September 1972	13 June 1975	SDP

Preceded by Paasio II Cabinet	Cabinet of Finland; 4 September 1972 – 13 June 1975	Succeeded by Liinamaa Cabinet
