= Liinamaa cabinet =

Government of Finland in 1975

Liinamaa Cabinet
- 57th Cabinet of Finland
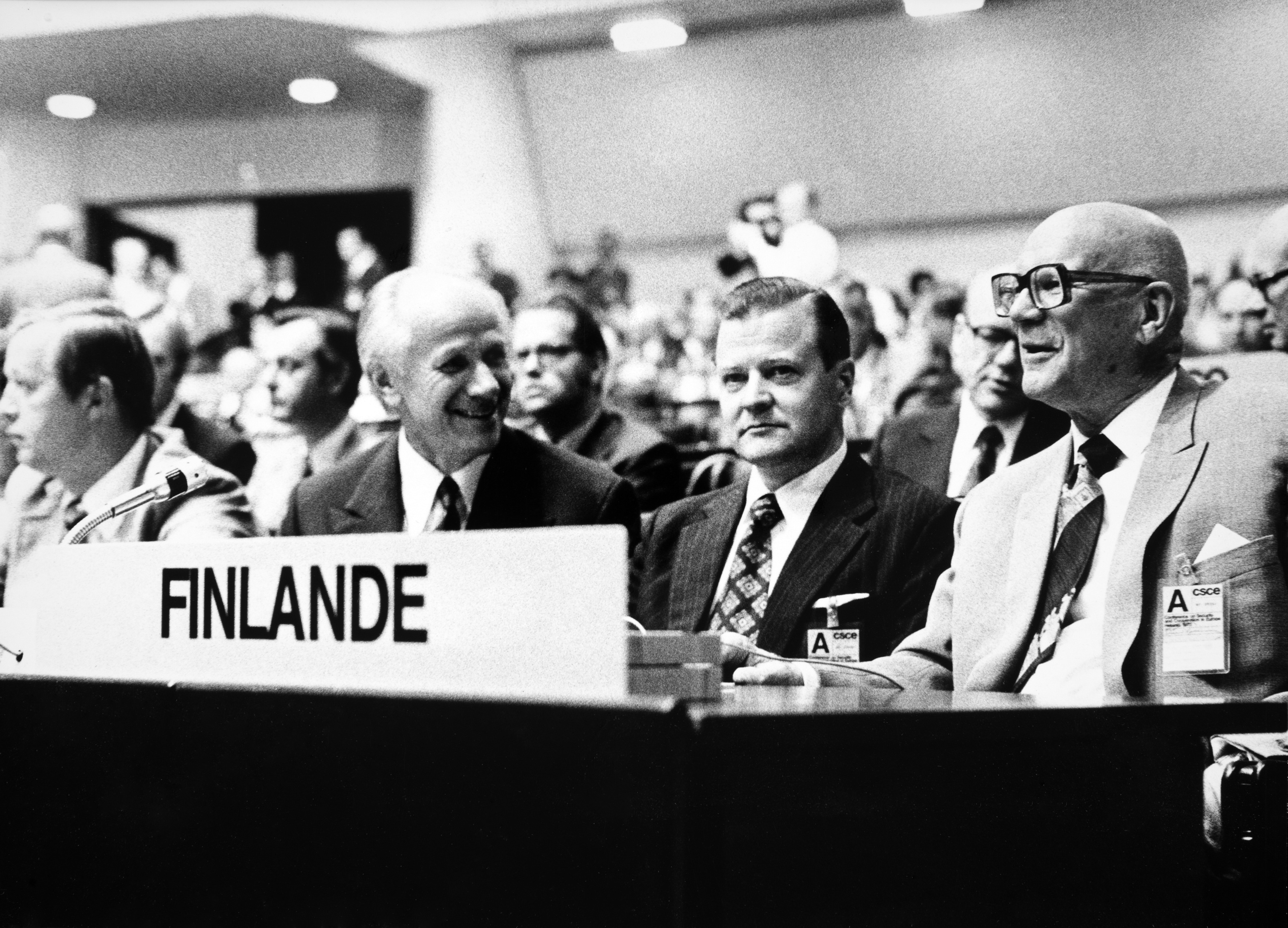
- Date formed: 13 June 1975
- Date dissolved: 30 November 1975

People and organisations
- President: Urho Kekkonen
- Prime Minister: Keijo Liinamaa
- Member party: none
- Status in legislature: Caretaker government

History
- Predecessor: Sorsa I
- Successor: Miettunen II

Keijo Liinamaa's cabinet was the 57th government of Finland. The cabinet existed for 171 days, lasting from 13 June 1975 to 30 November 1975. The Liinamaa cabinet was a caretaker government (Finnish: virkamieshallitus) drawn by President Urho Kekkonen. Due to this government having been instituted by the President, the government included no politically affiliated parties, consisting instead only of government employees. The cabinet's Prime Minister was Keijo Liinamaa.

== Ministers ==
Portfolio	Minister	Took office	Left office	Party
Prime Minister	Keijo Liinamaa	13 June 1975	30 November 1975	none
Minister deputising for the Prime Minister	Olavi J. Mattila	13 June 1975	30 November 1975	none
Minister at the Prime Minister's Office	Pekka Ahtiala	13 June 1975	30 November 1975	none
Minister for Foreign Affairs	Olavi J. Mattila	13 June 1975	30 November 1975	none
Minister at the Ministry for Foreign Affairs	Arvo Rytkönen	13 June 1975	30 November 1975	none
Minister of Justice	Inkeri Anttila	13 June 1975	30 November 1975	none
Minister of the Interior	Heikki Koski	13 June 1975	30 November 1975	none
Minister at the Ministry of the Interior	Aarno Strömmer	13 June 1975	30 November 1975	none
Minister of Defence	Erkki Huurtamo	13 June 1975	30 November 1975	none
Minister of Finance	Heikki Tuominen	13 June 1975	30 November 1975	none
Minister at the Ministry of Finance	Teuvo Varjas	13 June 1975	30 November 1975	none
Minister of Education	Lauri Posti	13 June 1975	30 November 1975	none
Minister of Agriculture and Forestry	Veikko Ihamuotila	13 June 1975	30 November 1975	none
Minister of Transport	Esa Timonen	13 June 1975	30 November 1975	none
Minister of Trade and Industry	Arvo Rytkönen	13 June 1975	30 November 1975	none
Minister at the Ministry of Trade and Industry	Jorma Uitto	13 June 1975	30 November 1975	none
Minister of Social Affairs and Health	Alli Lahtinen	13 June 1975	30 November 1975	none
Minister at the Ministry of Social Affairs and Health	Grels Teir	13 June 1975	30 November 1975	none
Minister of Labour	Ilmo Paananen	13 June 1975	30 November 1975	none

Preceded by Sorsa I Cabinet	Cabinet of Finland; 13 June 1975 – 30 November 1975	Succeeded by Miettunen II Cabinet
