= Paasio II cabinet =

55th cabinet of Finland

Paasio II Cabinet
- 55th Cabinet of Finland
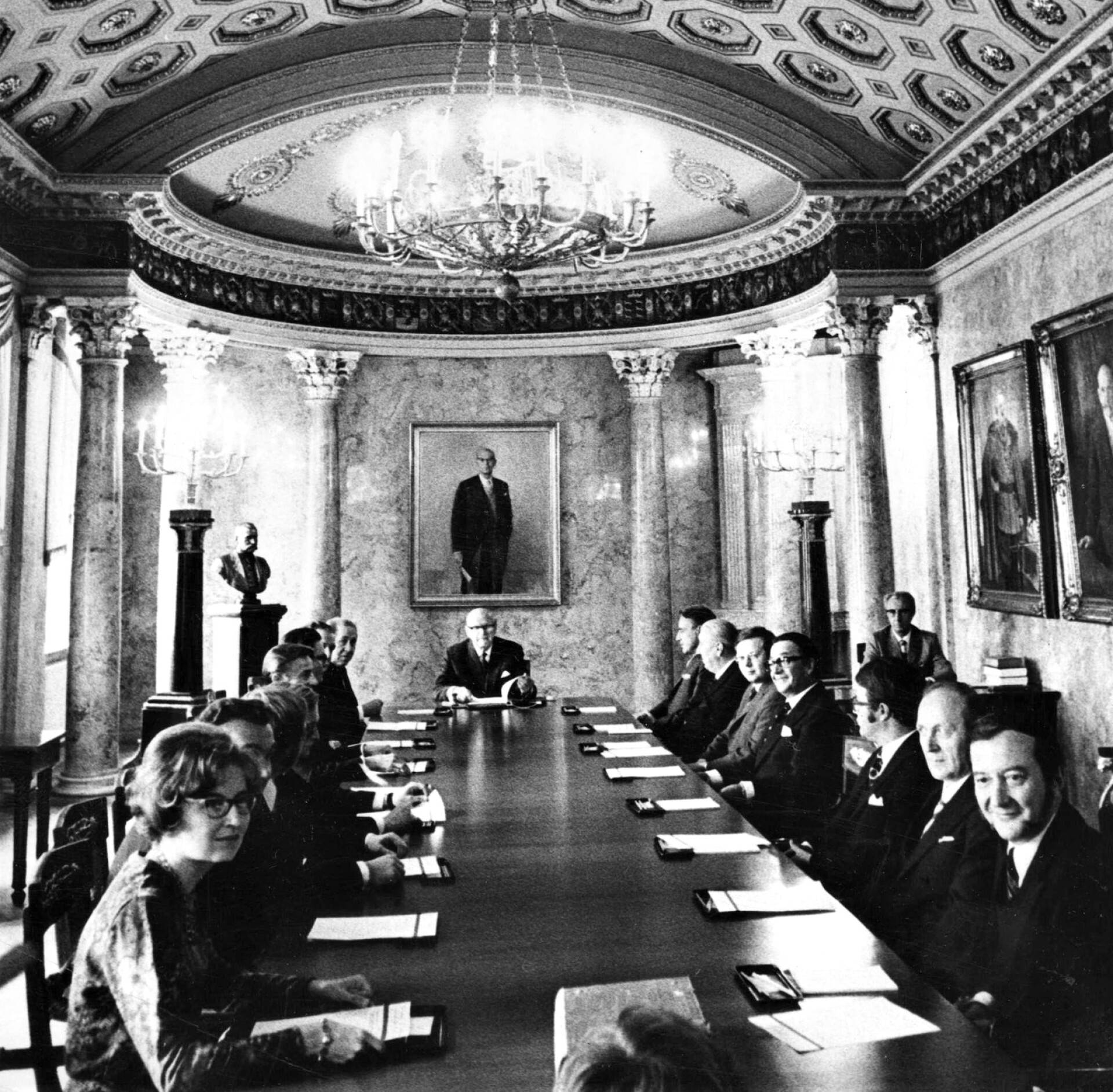
- Date formed: 23 February 1972
- Date dissolved: 4 September 1972

People and organisations
- President: Urho Kekkonen
- Prime Minister: Rafael Paasio
- Member party: Social Democratic Party
- Status in legislature: Minority government

History
- Predecessor: Aura II
- Successor: Sorsa I

Rafael Paasio's second cabinet was the 55th government of Finland. The administration ran from 23 February 1972 to 4 September 1972. It was a minority government formed by the Social Democratic Party.

Rafael Paasio resigned as Prime Minister on 4 September 1972 because the government was not able to start negotiations with the European Economic Community regarding a bilateral free trade area.

== Ministers ==
Portfolio	Minister	Took office	Left office	Party
Prime Minister	Rafael Paasio	23 February 1972	4 September 1972	SDP
Minister deputising for the Prime Minister	Mauno Koivisto	23 February 1972	4 September 1972	SDP
Minister at the Prime Minister's Office	Matti Louekoski	23 February 1972	4 September 1972	SDP
Minister for Foreign Affairs	Kalevi Sorsa	23 February 1972	4 September 1972	SDP
Minister at the Ministry for Foreign Affairs	Jussi Linnamo	23 February 1972	4 September 1972	SDP
Minister of Justice	Pekka Paavola	23 February 1972	4 September 1972	SDP
Minister of the Interior	Martti Viitanen	23 February 1972	4 September 1972	SDP
Minister of Defence	Sulo Hostila	23 February 1972	4 September 1972	SDP
Minister of Finance	Mauno Koivisto	23 February 1972	4 September 1972	SDP
Minister at the Ministry of Finance	Margit Eskman	23 February 1972	31 May 1972	SDP
Minister at the Ministry of Finance	Seija Karkinen	31 May 1972	4 September 1972	SDP
Minister of Education	Ulf Sundqvist	23 February 1972	31 December 1982	SDP
Minister at the Ministry of Education	Pentti Holappa	23 February 1972	31 December 1982	SDP
Minister of Agriculture and Forestry	Leo Happonen	23 February 1972	4 September 1972	SDP
Minister of Transport	Valde Nevalainen	23 February 1972	31 December 1982	SDP
Minister of Trade and Industry	Jussi Linnamo	23 February 1972	4 September 1972	SDP
Minister at the Ministry of Trade and Industry	Seppo Lindblom	23 February 1972	4 September 1972	SDP
Minister of Social Affairs and Health	Osmo Kaipainen	23 February 1972	30 June 1972	SDP
Minister at the Ministry of Social Affairs and Health	Ahti Fredriksson	23 February 1972	4 September 1972	SDP
Minister at the Ministry of Social Affairs and Health	Jussi Linnamo	25 February 1972	4 September 1972	SDP
Minister of Labour	Veikko Helle	23 February 1972	31 December 1972	SDP

Preceded by Aura II Cabinet	Cabinet of Finland; 23 February 1972 – 4 September 1972	Succeeded by Sorsa I Cabinet
