= Sorsa II cabinet =

60:th government of The Republic of Finland

- (1978–) (–1978)
- Date formed: 15 May 1977
- Date dissolved: 26 May 1979

People and organisations
- Prime Minister: Kalevi Sorsa
- Member parties: SDP; Centre Party; SKDL; Liberal People's Party; RKP
- Status in legislature: Majority government

History
- Predecessor: Miettunen III
- Successor: Koivisto II

Sorsa's second cabinet was the 60th government of Finland. The majority cabinet was in office from 15 May 1977 to 26 May 1979. The prime minister was Kalevi Sorsa (SDP).

The second Sorsa cabinet started its term during a time of financial hardship. This required the cabinet to mend the situation by the use of stimulus projects. The second Sorsa cabinet started to make plans for decreasing the rate of inflation and strengthening national export. Though initially negative, Finland's balance of international payments turned positive toward the end of the cabinet's term.

Assembly
Minister	Period of office	Party
Prime Minister; Kalevi Sorsa	15 May 1977 – 26 May 1979	Social Democratic Party
Deputy Prime Minister; Johannes Virolainen	15 May 1977 – 26 May 1979	Centre Party
Minister of Foreign Affairs; Paavo Väyrynen	15 May 1977 – 26 May 1979	Centre Party
Minister of Justice; Tuure Salo; Paavo Nikula	15 May 1977 – 2 March 1978; 2 March 1978 – 26 May 1979	Liberal People's Party; Liberal People's Party
Minister of the Interior; Eino Uusitalo	15 May 1977 – 26 May 1979	Centre Party
Deputy Minister of the Interior; Kristian Gestrin; Tuure Salo; Eero Rantala	15 May 1977 – 2 March 1978; 15 May 1977 – 2 March 1978; 2 March 1978 – 26 May 1979	Swedish People's Party
Deputy Minister of the Interior; Kristian Gestrin; Tuure Salo; Eero Rantala	15 May 1977 – 2 March 1978; 15 May 1977 – 2 March 1978; 2 March 1978 – 26 May 1979	Liberal People's Party
Deputy Minister of the Interior; Kristian Gestrin; Tuure Salo; Eero Rantala	15 May 1977 – 2 March 1978; 15 May 1977 – 2 March 1978; 2 March 1978 – 26 May 1979	Social Democratic Party
Minister of Defence; Taisto Tähkämaa	15 May 1977 – 26 May 1979	Centre Party
Minister of Finance; Paul Paavela	15 May 1977 – 26 May 1979	Social Democratic Party
Deputy Minister of Finance; Esko Rekola	15 May 1977 – 26 May 1979	Independent
Minister of Education; Kristian Gestrin; Jaakko Itälä	15 May 1977 – 2 March 1978; 2 March 1978 – 26 May 1979	Swedish People's Party
Minister of Education; Kristian Gestrin; Jaakko Itälä	15 May 1977 – 2 March 1978; 2 March 1978 – 26 May 1979	Liberal People's Party
Deputy Minister of Education; Kalevi Kivistö	15 May 1977 – 26 May 1979	People's Democratic League
Minister of Agriculture and Forestry; Johannes Virolainen	15 May 1977 – 26 May 1979	Centre Party
Minister of Traffic; Veikko Saarto	15 May 1977 – 26 May 1979	People's Democratic League
Minister of Trade and Industry; Eero Rantala	15 May 1977 – 26 May 1979	Social Democratic Party
Minister of Social Affairs and Health; Pirkko Työläjärvi	15 May 1977 – 26 May 1979	Social Democratic Party
Deputy Minister of Social Affairs and Health; Olavi Martikainen	15 May 1977 – 26 May 1979	Centre Party
Minister of Labour; Arvo Aalto	15 May 1977 – 26 May 1979	People's Democratic League

Preceded by Miettunen III Cabinet	Cabinet of Finland; 15 May 1977 – 26 May 1979	Succeeded by Koivisto II Cabinet
