= Paasio I cabinet =

50th cabinet of Finland

- 50th Cabinet of Finland
- Date formed: 27 May 1966
- Date dissolved: 22 March 1968

People and organisations
- Prime Minister: Rafael Paasio
- Member parties: SDP; Centre Party; SKDL; TPSL
- Status in legislature: Majority government

History
- Predecessor: Virolainen
- Successor: Koivisto I

Paasio's first cabinet was the 50th government of Finland, which lasted from 27 May 1966 to 22 March 1968. It was a majority government based on the popular front model. The cabinet's Prime Minister was Rafael Paasio.

Paasio's first cabinet made many political reforms, such as the primary school law, the party subsidies law, family and pension law, and the liberation of the sale of certain alcoholic beverages.

In October 1967, following a bad economic period which led to a low balance of international payments, the cabinet devaluated the markka by about 30 percent.

Rafael Paasio resigned as Prime Minister on 22 March 1968 following the failure of the Social Democratic Party in establishing good formal relations with the Soviet Union.

Assembly
Minister	Period of office	Party
Prime Minister; Rafael Paasio	27 May 1966 – 22 March 1968	Social Democratic Party
Deputy Prime Minister; Reino Oittinen	27 May 1966 – 22 March 196	Social Democratic Party
Minister of Foreign Affairs; Ahti Karjalainen	27 May 1966 – 22 March 1968	Centre Party
Minister of Justice; Aarre Simonen	27 May 1966 – 22 March 1968	Social Democratic Union of Workers and Smallholders
Minister of the Interior; Martti Viitanen; Antero Väyrynen	27 May 1966 – 30.11.1967; 1.12.1967 – 22 March 1968	Social Democratic Party; Social Democratic Party
Deputy Minister of the Interior; Sulo Suorttanen	27 May 1966 – 22 March 1968	Centre Party
Minister of Defence; Sulo Suorttanen	27 May 1966 – 22 March 1968	Centre Party
Minister of Finance; Mauno Koivisto; Eino Raunio	27 May 1966 – 31.12.1967; 1.1.1968 – 22 March 1968	Social Democratic Party; Social Democratic Party
Deputy Minister of Finance; Ele Alenius	27 May 1966 – 22 March 1968	People's Democratic League
Minister of Education; Reino Oittinen	27 May 1966 – 22 March 1968	Social Democratic Party
Minister of Agriculture; Nestori Kaasalainen	27 May 1966 – 22 March 1968	Centre Party
Deputy Minister of Agriculture; Lars Lindeman	27 May 1966 – 22 March 1968	Social Democratic Party
Minister of Transport and Public Works; Leo Suonpää	27 May 1966 – 22 March 1968	People's Democratic League (minority)
Deputy Minister of Transport and Public Works; Niilo Ryhtä; Matti Kekkonen	27 May 1966 – 31.8.1967; 8.9.1967 – 22 March 1968	Centre Party; Centre Party
Minister of Trade and Industry; Olavi Salonen	27 May 1966 – 22 March 1968	Social Democratic Party
Minister of Social Affairs; Matti Koivunen	27 May 1966 – 22 March 1968	People's Democratic League
Deputy Minister of Social Affairs; Esa Timonen; Toivo Saloranta	27 May 1966 – 31.8.1967; 8.9.1967 – 22 March 1968	Centre Party; Centre Party

Preceded by Virolainen Cabinet	Cabinet of Finland; May 27, 1966 – March 22, 1968	Succeeded by Koivisto I Cabinet
