= Miettunen II cabinet =

Government of Finland from 1975 to 1976

Miettunen II Cabinet
- 58th Cabinet of Finland
- Date formed: 30 November 1975
- Date dissolved: 29 September 1976

People and organisations
- President: Urho Kekkonen
- Prime Minister: Martti Miettunen
- Member parties: Centre Party; SDP; SKDL; RKP; Liberal People's Party
- Status in legislature: Majority government

History
- Predecessor: Liinamaa
- Successor: Miettunen III

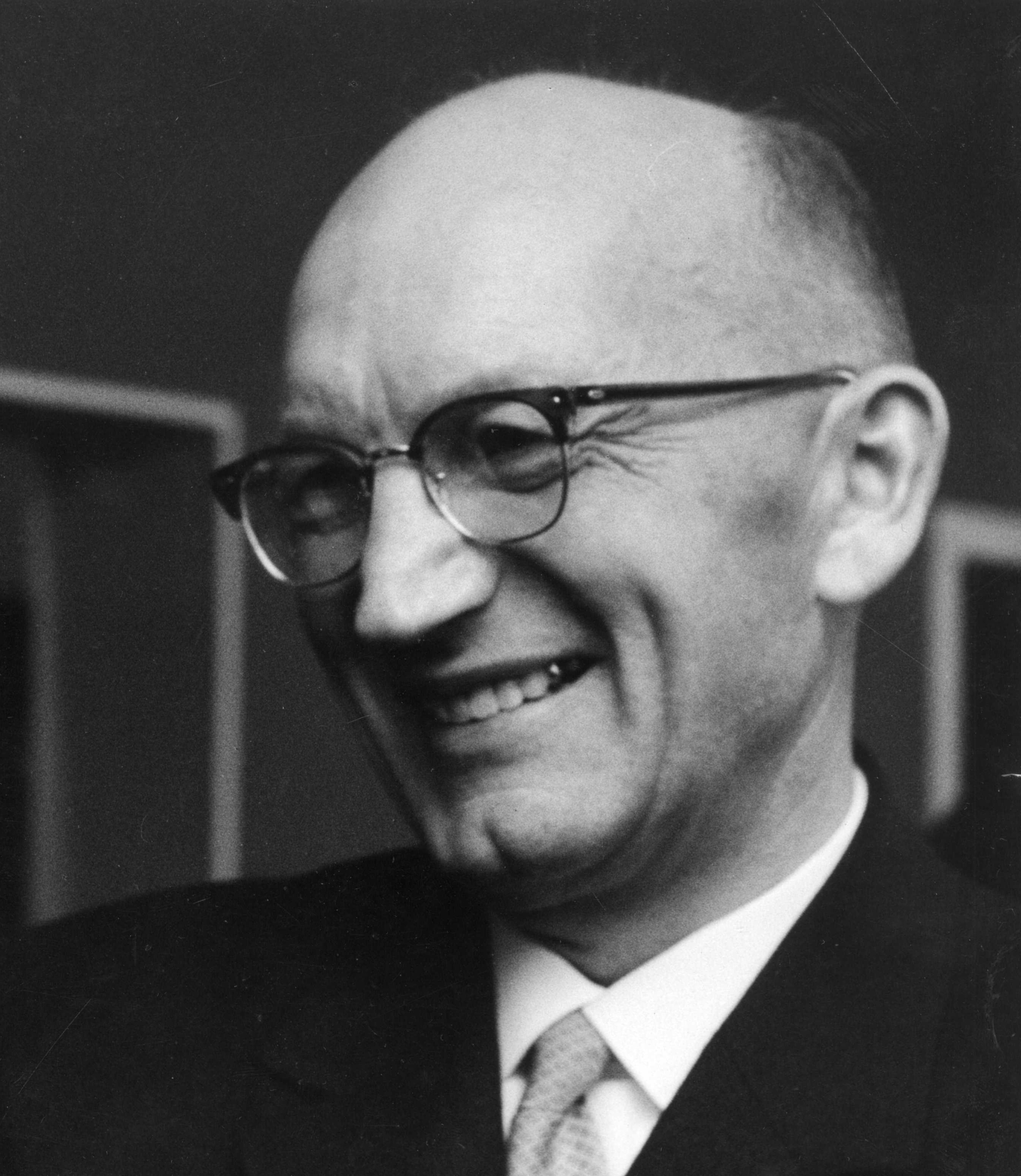
Finnish politician Martti Miettunen (1907-2002)

The second cabinet of Martti Miettunen was the 58th government of Finland, which lasted from 30 November 1975 to 29 September 1976. It was a majority government formed by the Centre Party, the Social Democrats, the Finnish People's Democratic League, the Swedish People's Party, the Liberals, and some unaffiliated politicians. The cabinet's Prime Minister was Martti Miettunen.

Miettunen's cabinet had large economic problems to solve resulting from the aftershock of the 1973 oil crisis.

== Ministers ==
Portfolio	Minister	Took office	Left office	Party
Prime Minister	Martti Miettunen	30 November 1975	29 September 1976	Centre
Minister deputising for the Prime Minister	Kalevi Sorsa	30 November 1975	29 September 1976	SDP
Minister at the Prime Minister's Office	Reino Karpola	30 November 1975	29 September 1976	Centre
Minister for Foreign Affairs	Kalevi Sorsa	30 November 1975	29 September 1976	SDP
Minister at the Ministry for Foreign Affairs	Sakari T. Lehto	30 November 1975	29 September 1976	Independent
Minister of Justice	Kristian Gestrin	30 November 1975	29 September 1976	RKP
Minister of the Interior	Paavo Tiilikainen	30 November 1975	29 September 1976	SDP
Minister at the Ministry of the Interior	Olavi Hänninen	30 November 1975	29 June 1976	SKDL
Minister at the Ministry of the Interior	Arvo Hautala	29 June 1976	29 September 1976	SKDL
Minister of Defence	Ingvar S. Melin	30 November 1975	29 September 1976	RKP
Minister of Finance	Paul Paavela	30 November 1975	29 September 1976	SDP
Minister at the Ministry of Finance	Viljo Luukka	30 November 1975	9 April 1976	Independent
Minister at the Ministry of Finance	Esko Rekola	9 April 1976	29 September 1976	Independent
Minister of Education	Paavo Väyrynen	30 November 1975	29 September 1976	Centre
Minister at the Ministry of Education	Kalevi Kivistö	30 November 1975	29 September 1976	SKDL
Minister of Agriculture and Forestry	Heimo Linna	30 November 1975	29 September 1976	Centre
Minister of Transport	Kauko Hjerppe	30 November 1975	29 September 1976	SKDL
Minister of Trade and Industry	Eero Rantala	30 November 1975	29 September 1976	SDP
Minister at the Ministry of Trade and Industry	Sakari Lehto	30 November 1975	29 September 1976	Independent
Minister of Social Affairs and Health	Irma Toivanen	30 November 1975	29 September 1976	Liberal People's Party
Minister at the Ministry of Social Affairs and Health	Pirkko Työläjärvi	30 November 1975	29 September 1976	SDP
Minister of Labour	Paavo Aitio	30 November 1975	29 September 1976	SKDL

Preceded by Liinamaa Cabinet	Cabinet of Finland; 30 November 1975 – 29 September 1976	Succeeded by Miettunen III cabinet
