= Inkeri Anttila =

Finnish jurist and criminologist (1916–2013)

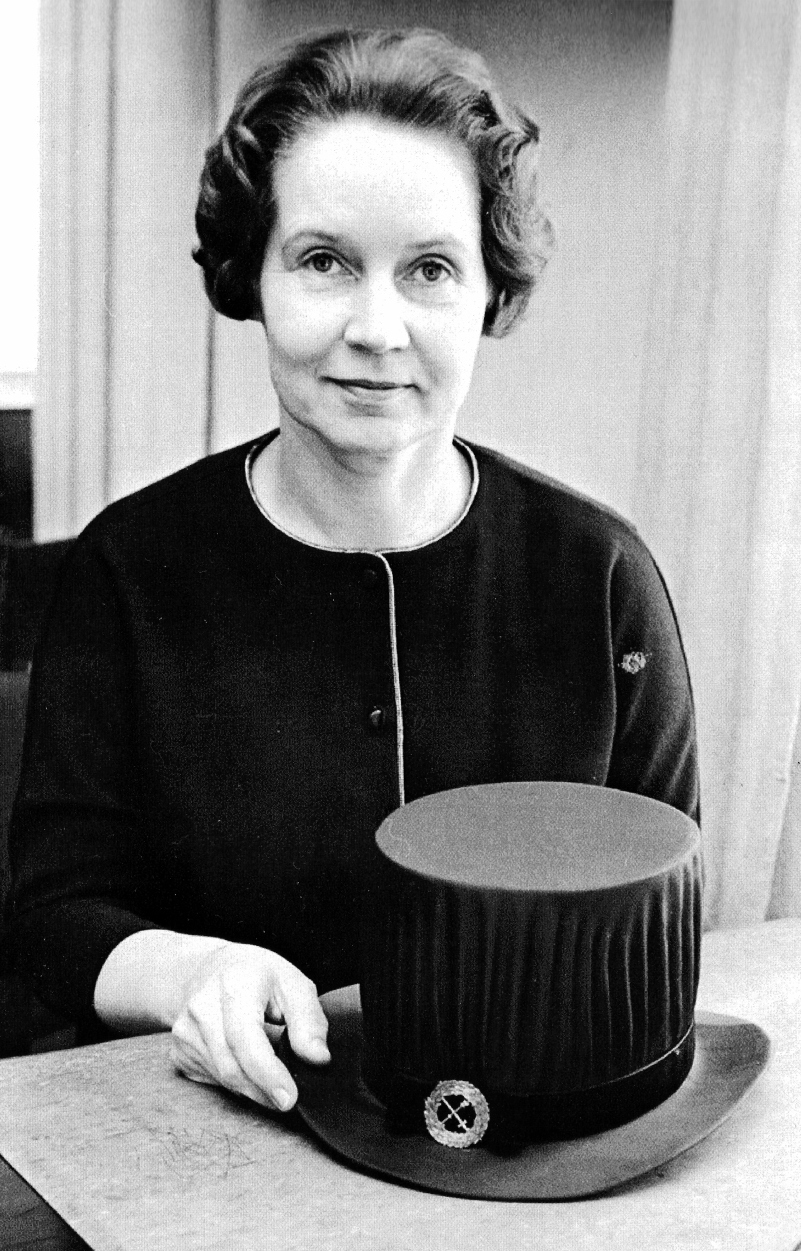
- Anttila with her doctoral hat in 1961

Minister of Justice of Finland
- In office 13 June 1975 – 30 November 1975
- Prime Minister: Keijo Liinamaa
- Preceded by: Matti Louekoski
- Succeeded by: Kristian Gestrin

Personal details
- Born: Sylvi Inkeri Metsämies; 29 November 1916 Viipuri, Grand Duchy of Finland, Russian Empire
- Died: 6 July 2013 (aged 96) Helsinki, Finland
- Spouse: Sulo Anttila (m. 1934)
- Children: 3
- Education: University of Helsinki

Sylvi Inkeri Anttila (née Metsämies; 29 November 1916 – 6 July 2013) was a Finnish jurist and criminologist who was the Minister of Justice of Finland during the caretaker government of Keijo Liinamaa in 1975. She studied criminal law at the University of Helsinki, becoming the first woman in Finland to receive a doctorate in law in 1946 and the first female professor of criminal law in Finland in 1961.

== Early life and education ==
Sylvi Inkeri Metsämies was born on 29 November 1916 in Viipuri, Finland. She was the only child of Veini Metsämies, a lawyer, and Sylvi Airio, a musician. Metsämies graduated from high school in 1933 and attended the Faculty of Law at the University of Helsinki. She married Sulo Anttila, a pulmonologist, on 8 December 1934; they had three children born between 1938 and 1944. Inkeri Anttila received the Master of Laws degree in 1937 and passed the bar examination in 1942. The family moved to Imatra where Sulo worked at a local sanatorium, and evacuated five times during the Continuation War.

Anttila received the Doctor of Philosophy degree in criminal law from the University of Helsinki in 1946 after defending her dissertation titled "Consent as a justifying ground". She was the first woman to receive a doctorate in law in Finland. She later received a licentiate degree in sociology from the University of Helsinki in 1954.

== Career ==
Anttila became an associate professor in criminal and procedural law in 1947, and completed a habilitation thesis in penal law the following year. In the 1950s, she was the director of a training center for prison staff and published works on criminal law. Anttila was appointed to a full professorship at the University of Helsinki in 1961, becoming the first female professor in criminal law in Finland. She became the first director of the Institute of Criminology in Finland's Ministry of Justice in 1963, and led various government commissions on juvenile crime, abortion, and women's rights. During this time, Anttila frequently hosted a "night task force" (yötyöryhmä) at her home as a discussion space where Ph.D. students of criminal law could receive guidance and informal supervision.

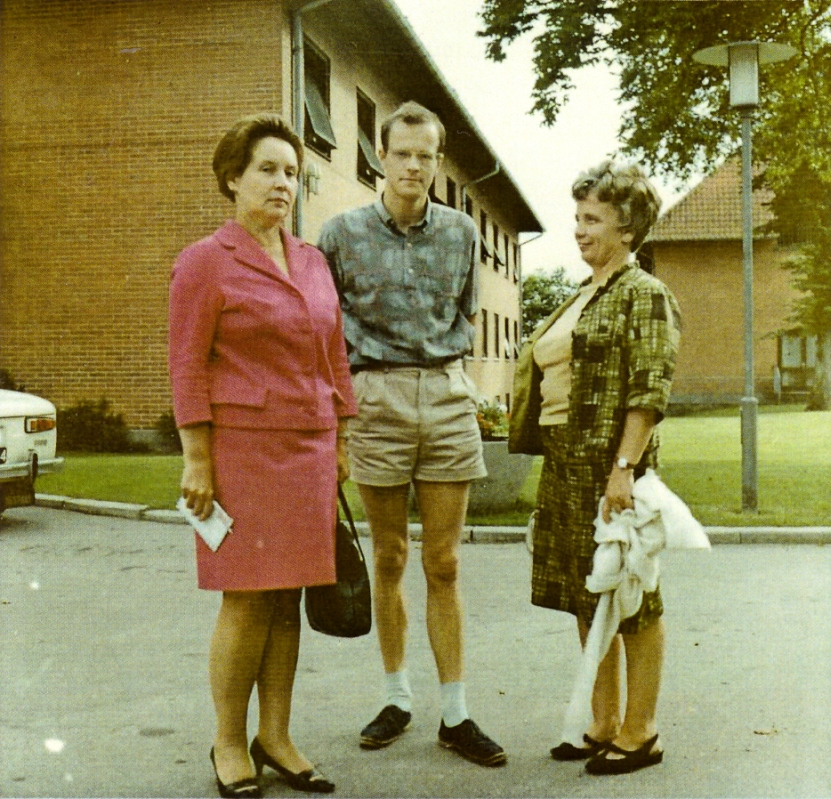
Anttila, Kaarle Nordenstreng, and Birgit Eweryd in Denmark in 1967

She was appointed as Minister of Justice by caretaker prime minister Keijo Liinamaa on 13 June 1975, and held the position until 30 November 1975, when a new coalition government was formed. She was the first female Minister of Justice in Finland, and led discussions to reform conditional sentences, drunk driving, and parole during her six-month tenure. She also worked to repeal a law that prevented women from serving in certain government roles. During this year, Anttila was also elected as chair of the United Nations' World Criminal Justice Conference. In the early 1980s, she was the first director of the UN's European Institute for Crime Prevention and Control (HEUNI), which was based in Finland.

Throughout her career, Anttila advocated for a humane approach to criminal justice, working towards both reforms in sentencing for offenders and improving protections and services for victims. She was described as an "influential reformist" of the harsh Finnish criminal policies of the 1950s.

== Death ==
Anttila died on 6 July 2013 in Helsinki, at the age of 96.

== Selected publications ==
According to WorldCat, Anttila authored 79 works between 1946 and 2009. Selected publications include:

- Anttila, Inkeri (1974). Current Scandinavian criminology and crime control. Helsinki: Research Institute of Legal Policy. ISBN 9789517040198. OCLC 83852069.
- —— (1975). Incarceration for crimes never committed. Helsinki: Research Institute of Legal Policy. ISBN 9789517040266. OCLC 6041446.
- —— (1979). Women in the criminal justice system. Helsinki: Research Institute of Legal Policy. ISBN 9789517040587. OCLC 8346669.
- —— (2001). Raimo, Lahti; Patrik, Törnudd (eds.). Ad ius criminale humanius: essays in criminology, criminal justice and criminal policy. Helsinki: Finnish Lawyers' Association. ISBN 9789518551938. OCLC 49557065.
