= Heli Paasio =

Finnish politician

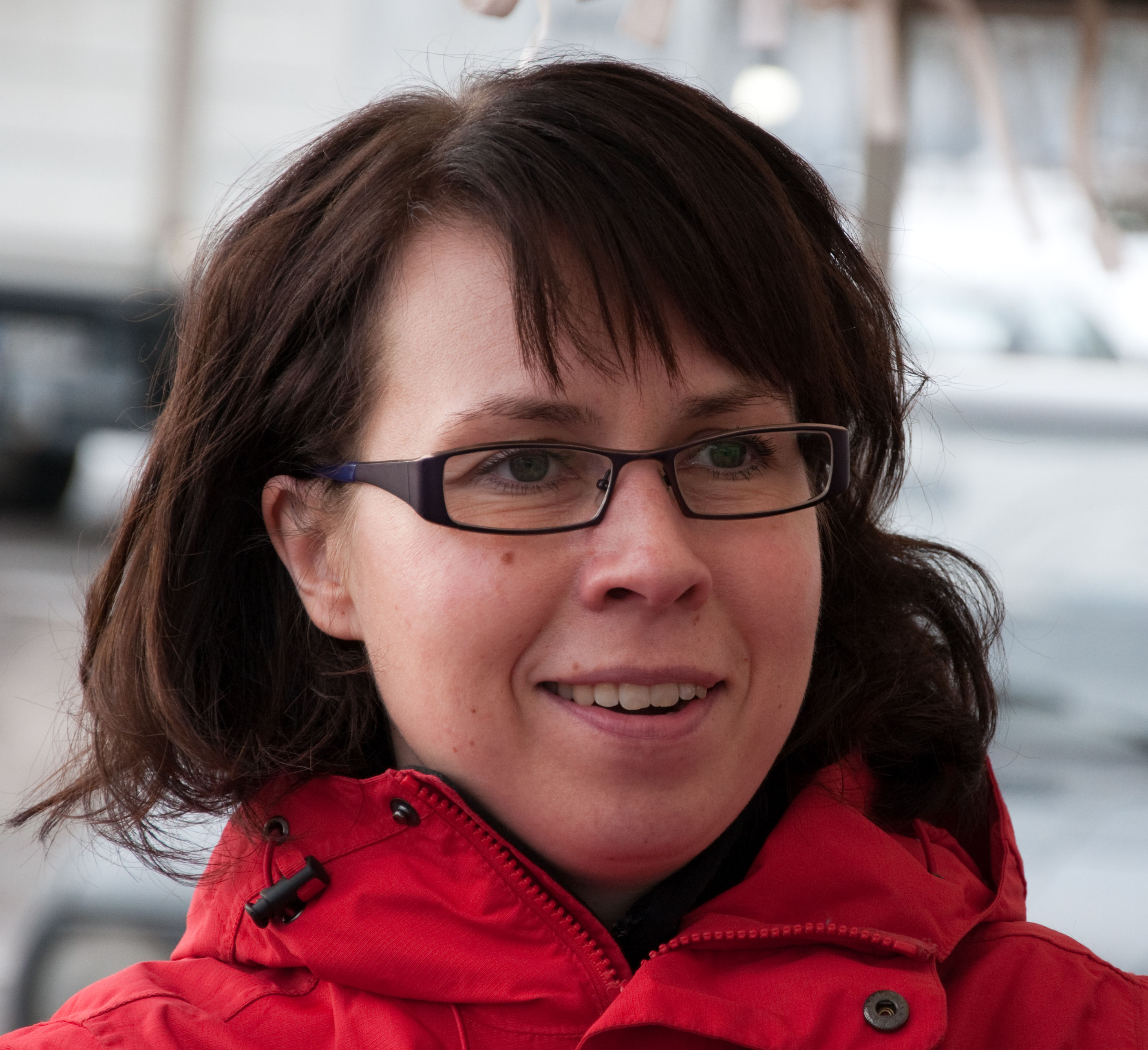
- Heli Paasio

Member of the Finland Parliament for Finland Proper
- In office 1999–2015

Personal details
- Born: Heli Tuulikki Paasio; November 24, 1972 (age 53) Turku, Finland
- Party: Social Democratic Party
- Parent: Pertti Paasio

Heli Tuulikki Paasio (born November 24, 1972, in Turku) is a Finnish politician from Turku. A Social Democrat, she was member of the Parliament of Finland for Finland Proper from 1999 to 2015.

Paasio is the daughter of Pertti Paasio and the granddaughter of Rafael Paasio who were both prominent Social Democratic politicians. She graduated as Master of Philosophy (mathematics teacher) in 1999. She was elected to the Parliament four times. In the 2011 election she received 13,945 votes, the most in the Finland Proper constituency and the eight-most in the entire Finland. After a parliamentary career of sixteen years, she retired from the Parliament in 2015.
