= Margit Eskman =

Finnish politician (1925–1990)

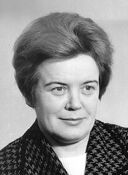

Member of the Parliament of Finland
- In office 5 April 1966 – 26 September 1975
- Constituency: Turku Province North

Finland Second Minister of Finance
- In office 23 February 1972 – 31 May 1972
- Prime Minister: Rafael Paasio

Personal details
- Born: 29 April 1925 Hattula, Finland
- Died: 15 September 1990 (aged 65) Pori, Finland
- Party: Social Democratic Party
- Spouse: Martti Eskman (m. 1956)

Margit Marjatta Margareetta Eskman (29 April 1925 – 15 September 1990) was a Finnish politician. She was a member of the Parliament of Finland from 1966 to 1975, representing Turku Province North (now Satakunta) as a member of the Social Democratic Party. She was the Second Minister of Finance from February to May 1972, the first woman to hold that position. Eskman later served as the director-general of Finland's national social security agency and the National Board of Social Welfare.

== Early life and education ==
Eskman was born on 29 April 1925 in Hattula, Finland, and had to work in a shoe factory instead of attending secondary school. She later attended the Workers' Academy in Kauniainen, graduating in 1945, and received a diploma in municipal government from the School of Social Sciences (now the University of Tampere) in 1947. In 1966, Eskman received a degree in taxation from the School of Social Sciences.

== Political career ==
Eskman's parents had been active within the Social Democratic Party (SDP) since she was young. After she completed her studies in municipal government in 1947, she worked in various roles in the municipal governments of Hämeenkyrö, Mellilä, and Helsinki. In 1952, Eskman began working as the municipal secretary in Kalvola, a role she held until 1963 when she became the municipal secretary in Aitolahti. In 1953, she became involved with the women's branch of the SDP. She married Martti Eskman, who was a social services director, in 1956. From 1964 to 1972, she was the social secretary of the city of Pori.

Eskman was elected to the Parliament of Finland in 1966 to represent the constituency of Turku Province North (now Satakunta) as a member of the SDP. During her time in Parliament, she sat on the committees on finance, legal affairs, and agriculture and forestry, and frequently worked on economic and tax legislation. From February to May 1970, Eskman was a member of prime minister Mauno Koivisto's cabinet as Minister in the Prime Minister's Office. She was Second Minister of Finance in Rafael Paasio's second cabinet from February to May 1972, and was the first woman to hold that position. As the second minister of finance, Eskman worked on collective bargaining policies and helped implement the separation of taxes for married couples in Finland. She is described in The National Biography of Finland as one of the most important female politicians of the SDP during the 1970s.

She resigned her ministerial position in 1972 to become the director-general of Kela, the Social Insurance Institution of Finland. She was the first female director-general of the institution and remained in the position for four years. She was elected as the vice president of the SDP in 1972, and was the second woman to hold a leadership position in the party, after Tyyne Leivo-Larsson. In 1976, Eskman became the director-general of Finland's National Board of Social Welfare, succeeding Alli Lahtinen; she was the second director-general of the board since its creation in 1968. She retired in 1984 due to health issues.

== Death ==
Eskman died at Satakunta Central Hospital in Pori on 15 September 1990 after a long illness, at the age of 65.

== See also ==
- List of Cabinet Ministers from Finland by ministerial portfolio
