= Arvo Rytkönen =

Finnish diplomat

Arvo Rytkönen (4 November 1929 in Virolahti – 24 February 1980) was a Finnish Ambassador and Minister of Trade and Industry and one of the ministers in the ministry of foreign affairs in Liinamaa caretaker cabinet.

The peak and the end of Arvo Rytkönen's career in trade matters hit the 1970s. He was instrumental in the development of Finland's foreign trade relations as the Head of the Trade Policy Department, as the Under-Secretary of State for Trade Policy Affairs and Chairman of the Advisory Board on Foreign Trade and for a short time as Minister of Commerce and Industry of the Civil Service in caretaker cabinet.

Rytkönen served as Ambassador of Finland in Bonn from 1979 to 1980.
