= Lars Lindeman =

Finnish politician

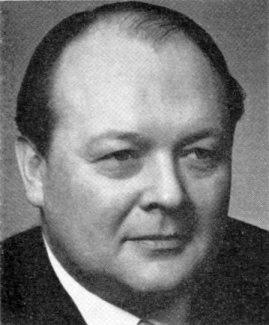
Lindeman in 1967

Lars Sebastian "Basse" Lindeman (23 March 1920 in Viipuri – 14 September 2006 in Lahti) was a Finnish politician and ambassador.

Lindeman completed his degree in agricultural engineering in 1944. He worked in the municipality of Ingå since 1945 and as a representative of the Finlands Svenska Arbetarförbund since 1947. He was a Social Democratic MP from the Uusimaa constituency between 1958 and 1976, after which he became Ambassador to Oslo and Reykjavík between 1976 and 1984 and to Lisbon in 1984-1985. He was the second Minister of Agriculture in Paasio I Cabinet from 1966 to 1968.
