= Eero Rantala =

Finnish politician (1941–2019)

Minister of Trade and Industry
- In office 30 November 1975 – 29 September 1976
- Prime Minister: Martti Miettunen
- In office 15 May 1977 – 26 May 1979
- Prime Minister: Kalevi Sorsa

Minister of Interior
- In office 2 March 1978 – 26 May 1979
- Prime Minister: Kalevi Sorsa

Personal details
- Born: 5 October 1941 Helsinki, Finland
- Died: 5 February 2019 (aged 77) Helsinki, Finland
- Party: Social Democratic Party of Finland

Eero Rantala (5 October 1941–5 February 2019) was a Finnish politician who held several cabinet posts in late 1970s. He was a member of the Social Democratic Party of Finland.

== Biography ==
Rantala was born in Helsinki on 5 October 1941. He served in the Finnish army with the rank of first lieutenant. Then he worked at different cooperatives in research and management positions.

Rantala joined the Social Democratic Party of Finland. His first cabinet post was the minister of trade and industry to which he was appointed on 30 November 1975. He held the post until 29 September 1976 in the second cabinet led by Martti Miettunen.

Rantala was appointed minister of trade and industry on 15 May 1977 to the second cabinet of Kalevi Sorsa and remained in office until 26 May 1979. Rantala also held the post of the minister of interior in the same cabinet between 2 March 1978 and 26 May 1979.

Following his retirement from ministerial posts Rantala was appointed the director of the OTK cooperative's food group and became the general director of the company in 1981. He was the first president of the Eka-Yhtymä, a multi-sector cooperative group, and assumed the post between 1983 and 1994. Next he worked in Germany and was involved in the privatization and investment projects of the former East German industrial companies. Rantala was appointed by the Finnish Prime Ministry as an investigator in October 2002 to examine the cooperation between Finland and Germany to promote the European Union's Northern Dimension action program.

Rantala founded the Eero Rantala Fund in 1991 which awards a music prize.

Rantala was married to Seija-Leena Rantala. He died in Helsinki on 5 February 2019 at the age of 77.
