= Kristian Gestrin =

Finnish judge and politician (1929–1990)

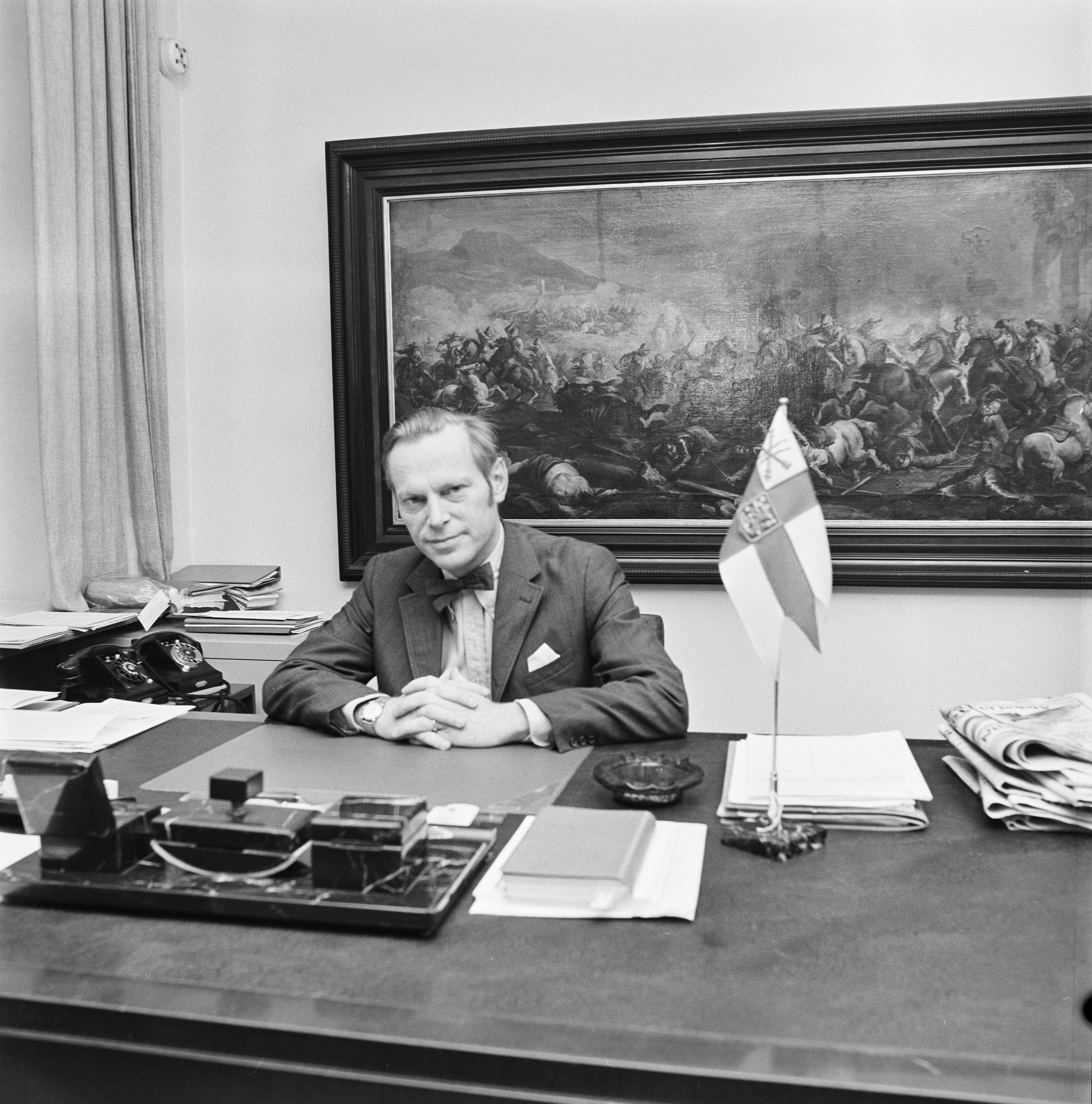
- Born: 10 April 1929; Helsinki
- Died: 7 April 1990 (aged 60)
- Occupation: Judge
- Years active: 1950s–1990

Kristian Gestrin (1929–1990) was a Finnish judge and politician who served in several cabinet posts in the 1970s. He was a long-term member of the Finnish Parliament. He also headed the Swedish People's Party of Finland in the period 1973–1974.

== Biography ==
Gestrin was born in Helsinki on 10 April 1929. He was a judge by profession. He was a member of the Finnish Parliament from 20 February 1962 to 23 March 1979. The cabinet posts of Gestrin included: minister of defense in the second cabinet of Ahti Karjalainen between 15 July 1970 and 28 October 1971 and in the cabinet led by Kalevi Sorsa between 4 September 1972 and 30 September 1974; minister for trade and industry in the same cabinet between 1 October 1974 and 12 June 1975; minister of justice in the second and third cabinet of Martti Miettunen between 30 November 1975 and 14 May 1977; minister of education in the second cabinet of Kalevi Sorsa from 15 May 1977 to 1 March 1978.

He headed the Swedish People's Party of Finland for one year between 1973 and 1974. Then he served as the governor of Helsinki Savings Bank.

Gestrin died on 7 April 1990.
