= Gunnar Korhonen =

Finnish politician (1918–2001)

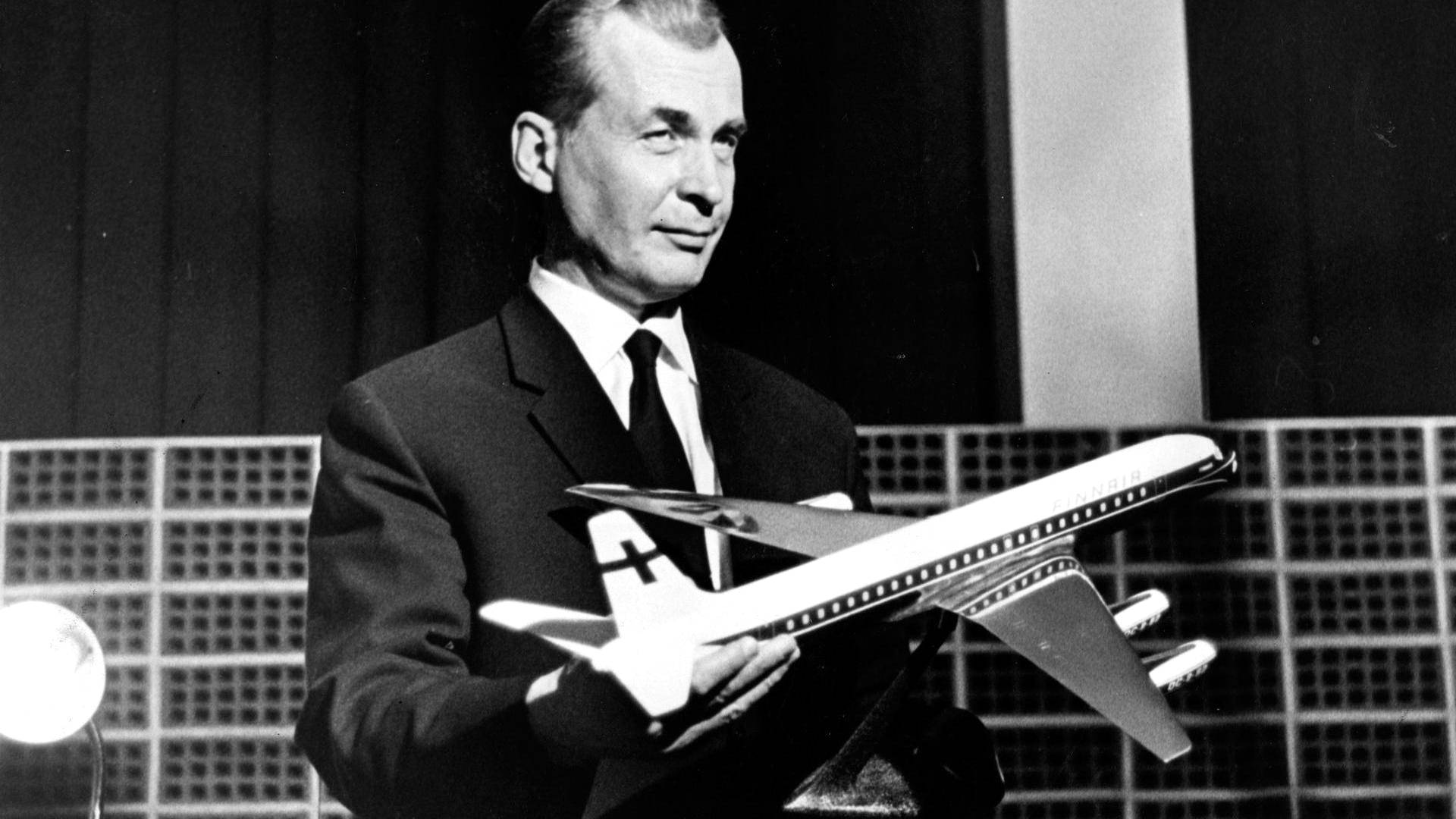
- Korhonen holding a model DC-8 Super 62 CF, 1966

CEO of Finnair
- In office 1960–1987
- Preceded by: Leonard Grandell
- Succeeded by: Antti Potila

Minister of Social Affairs and Health
- In office 14 May 1970 – 15 July 1970
- Prime Minister: Teuvo Aura
- Preceded by: Anna-Liisa Tiekso
- Succeeded by: Anna-Liisa Tiekso

Minister of Trade and Industry
- In office 29 October 1971 – 23 February 1972
- Prime Minister: Teuvo Aura
- Preceded by: Arne Berner
- Succeeded by: Jussi Linnamo

Deputy Minister of Health and Social Affairs
- In office 29 October 1971 – 23 February 1972
- Prime Minister: Teuvo Aura
- Preceded by: Arne Berner
- Succeeded by: Ahti Fredriksson

Personal details
- Born: Gunnar Aleksander Korhonen; 22 April 1918 Vyborg, Finland
- Died: 9 June 2001 (aged 83) Helsinki, Finland
- Party: Non-partisan

Gunnar Aleksander Korhonen (22 April 1918 – 9 June 2001) was a Finnish politician and the CEO of Finnair from 1960–1987.

== Career ==
Korhonen had a degree in economics and worked as a civil servant. He became the CEO of Finnair in 1960. He was the Minister of Social Affairs and Health briefly in 1970 during Aura's caretaker government. During Aura's second caretaker government from 1971–1972 he was both Minister of Trade and Industry and Deputy Minister of Health and Social Affairs.

== In popular culture ==
He was played by Taisto Oksanen in the Finnish docudrama Keihäsmatkat.

== See also ==
- List of Cabinet Ministers from Finland by ministerial portfolio
