= Pertti Paasio =

Finnish politician (1939–2020)

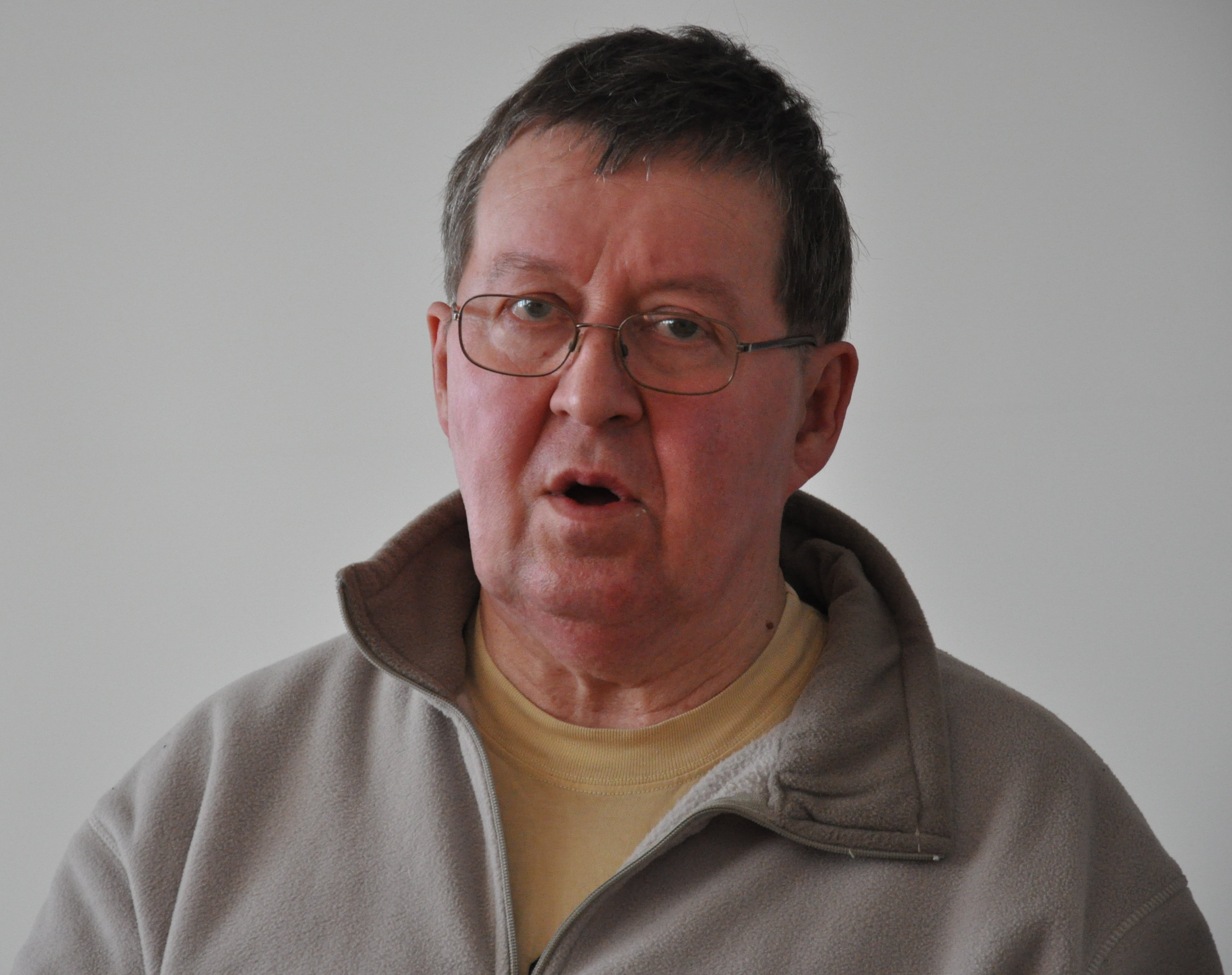
- Paasio in 2009
- In office July 1975 – 1979
- In office 1982–1996
- Preceded by: Jacob Söderman

Personal details
- Born: Pertti Kullervo Paasio; 2 April 1939 Helsinki, Finland
- Died: 4 April 2020 (aged 81)
- Party: Social Democratic Party
- Children: Heli Paasio
- Parent: Rafael Paasio

Pertti Kullervo Paasio (2 April 1939 – 4 April 2020) was a Finnish politician from the Social Democratic Party. He was born in Helsinki.

Paasio participated in the municipal politics of Turku and was elected into the municipal council in 1965. Paasio became member of the Parliament in July 1975, however, he lost the seat in the 1979 parliamentary elections. In 1982 he replaced Jacob Söderman in the Parliament and held the seat until he was elected into the European Parliament in 1996.

Paasio followed the path of his father, Rafael Paasio, when he was elected to succeed Kalevi Sorsa as the chairman of the Social Democratic Party in 1987. Paasio succeeded Sorsa in the government as the Minister of Foreign Affairs on 1 February 1989. However, the Social Democratic Party suffered a defeat in the 1991 parliamentary elections, which led to the resignation of Paasio as the party chairman.

His daughter Heli Paasio was a member of the Parliament. He died on 4 April 2020, two days after his 81st birthday.
