= Pirkkala handout =

Pirkkala handout (Finnish: Pirkkalan moniste) was an educational handout concerning history, produced by the Finnish Ministry of Education, the Finnish National Agency for Education and the University of Tampere department of psychology to be used by fifth graders during the 1974–75 semester in primary schools of the municipality of Pirkkala. The official title of the 95-page handout is Historia : 5. luokka : ihmiskunnan kehityksen yleispiirteet vanhimmista ajoista nykypäiviin saakka (transl. History: Fifth grade: outline of the developments of humanity from the most ancient times to the present). The handout becoming general knowledge sparked a major uproar in Finland in 1975. The handout was drafted by Antti Penttilä, and the experiment was observed by Kari Koukkunen on the behalf of the National Agency for Education and by a panel named PETO (peruskoulun toimivan opetussuunnitelman projekti, transl. "project for a functional curriculum in elementary education") chaired by professor Tapio Nummenmaa.

The handout followed Marxist historiography and focused significantly upon social classes and social structure being dependent upon the structure of production. The handout was characteristically pro-Soviet, and its usage for educational purposes created a major uproar. The contents of the handout had been acquired from the Soviet Union, chiefly from a Finnish-language history textbook printed in Petrozavodsk in the 1950s. The handout e.g. accused Finland's political leadership of the 1930s for having close relations with Nazi Germany, yet the Molotov–Ribbentrop Pact was not mentioned in the handout at all. The Second World War was depicted purely as a conflict between fascism and communism, and from the handout it was not possible to infer on which side the United States had fought in the war. In professional reviews requested by the National Agency for Education the handout was considered erroneous, omitting details, misleading and wholly one-sided, and it was said to create a ″misleading, black-and-white view of the history of humanity.″

The debacle resulted in an inquiry on materials used in elementary education in May 1975. Minister of Education Ulf Sundqvist considered the handout not to fulfill the requirements for material used for elementary education. Second Minister of Education Marjatta Väänänen considered the experiment a scandal. Trade Union of Education in Finland (Opettajien Ammattijärjestö, OAJ) presented its stark opposition to the school system being employed as a means to one-sided political nurturing. The experiment was also denounced by most of the political party spectrum aside from the Taistoist minority of the Communist Party of Finland, which expressed the denunciation as ″a reactionary attack against the freedom of education.″

The University of Tampere unanimously decided to discontinue the experiment in June 1975. The National Agency for Education also decided to abandon the use of the handout, as it presented too one-sided a view of history, according to its chairman Erkki Aho.

The Pirkkala handout has later been seen as an example of Finlandization in education in the 1970s, although in practice the repercussions of the actual experiment were minor compared to the general reactions to it.

== Composition of the panel ==
- Erkki Aho, chairman of the National Agency for Education
- Tapio Nummenmaa, professor of psychology
- Liisa Rantalaiho, doctor of psychology
- Juhani Karvonen, professor of pedagogy
- Annika Takala, professor of pedagogy
- Tuomas Takala, BSEd
