= Pentti Holappa =

Finnish poet, writer and politician

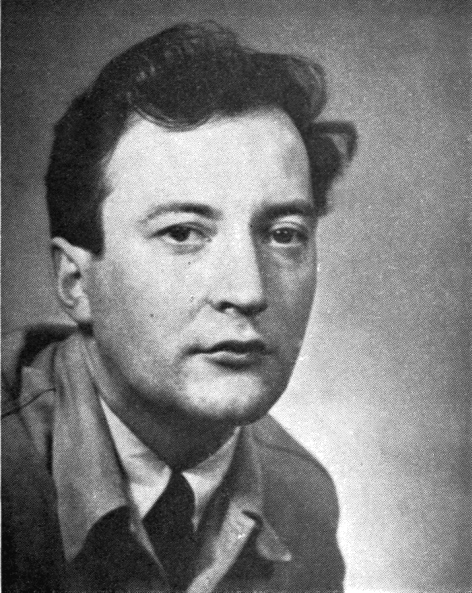
Pentti Holappa in the late 1950s

Pentti Vihtori Holappa (11 August 1927 – 10 October 2017) was a Finnish poet, writer and politician. Born in Ylikiiminki to a relatively poor family of modest means, he held numerous jobs before becoming a political journalist and eventually obtaining a government post. He was self-educated, but produced around fifteen volumes of poetry, as well as several novels and essays. He also worked as a translator; among the poets and authors whose work he translated into Finnish are Charles Baudelaire, Pierre Reverdy, and J. M. G. Le Clézio. He received the Finlandia Prize in 1998 for his novel Ystävän muotokuva: Portrait of a Friend.

Between February and October 1972, Holappa was Minister of Culture and Education in the Paasio II Cabinet representing the Social Democratic Party of Finland.

Holappa acknowledged his homosexuality at a young age. He met Olli-Matti Ronimus in 1953, after which the two moved in together. They lived in France on-and-off in the 1950s, where they learned the French language.

== Bibliography ==
- Long Words: Poems 1950–1994 (1997)
- Ystävän muotokuva: Portrait of a Friend
