= Seppo Westerlund =

Finnish engineer and politician (1930–2014)

Personal details
- Born: 1930
- Died: 2014 (aged 83–84)

Seppo Assar Kustaa Westerlund (2 November 1930 – 22 February 2014) was a Finnish engineer and politician, born in Oulu. He began his political career in the Liberal League. He was a member of the Parliament of Finland from 1970 to 1979, representing the Liberal People's Party (LKP). He served as Minister of Defence from 29 September 1976 to 15 May 1977. He was a presidential elector in the 1978 Finnish presidential election.
