= Marjatta Väänänen =

Finnish politician (1923–2020)

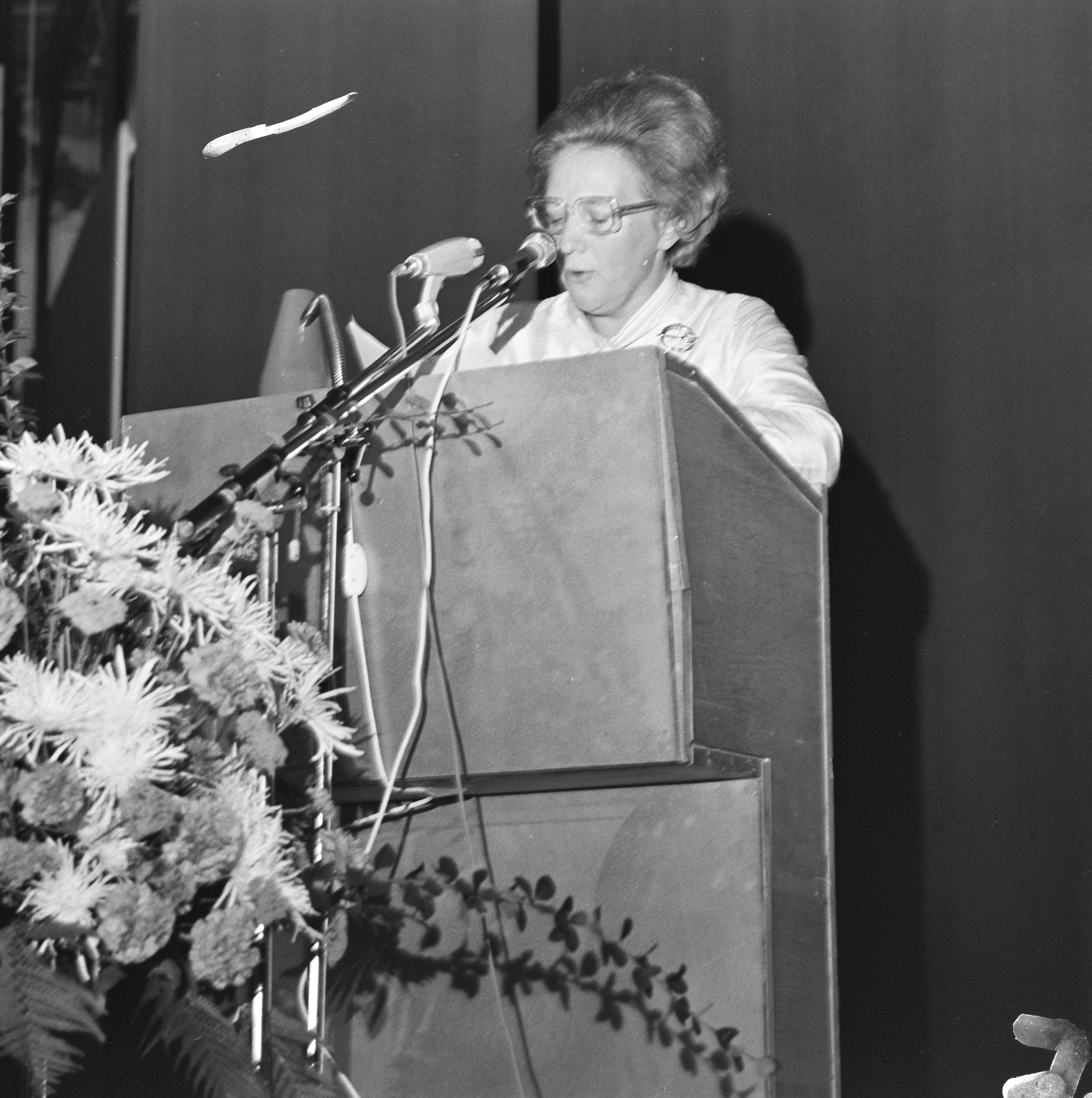
- Väänänen in 1972.

Member of Parliament for Uusimaa
- In office 1975–1991
- Prime Minister: Kalevi Sorsa; Harri Holkeri; Esko Aho
- Constituency: Uusimaa

Personal details
- Born: 9 August 1923 Jyväskylä, Finland
- Died: 16 October 2020 (aged 97) Helsinki, Finland
- Party: Centre Party
- Spouse: Jouko Väänänen
- Education: University of Helsinki

Marjatta Väänänen (9 August 1923 – 16 October 2020) was a Finnish politician who was a Member of Parliament for the Centre Party from 1975 to 1991. She served as Minister of Culture, Minister of Education, and Minister of Social Affairs and Health.

== Personal life and death ==
Väänänen was born on 9 August 1923 in Jyväskylä, Finland. Väänänen's father Urho Kittilä was a journalist, and she had younger siblings. Väänänen earned a degree in 1943, and a Master's degree in 1950 from the University of Helsinki. She was married to Jouko Väänänen, who edited the newspaper Maaseudun Tulevaisuus (Finnish: The Future of the Countryside) from 1968 to 1984. They had three children, and seven grandchildren.

Väänänen died at the age of 97 on 16 October 2020 after a long illness. At the time of her death, she had been the oldest living former minister of Finnish Government.

== Career ==
In the 1950s, Väänänen worked as a news reporter for the Swedish Agricultural Association. In the 1960s, she worked part time at Kotiliesi magazine, and in 1969 she started working at Valio.

In 1971, Väänänen was elected to the Centre Party's women's organisation. She later became chairperson of the women's organisation. In 1972, she became the Minister of Science and Culture in Kalevi Sorsa's government. At the 1975 Finnish parliamentary election, Väänänen was elected as a representative for Uusimaa. She received the most votes of any Centre Party female candidate in the election. She became the Minister of Education in Martti Miettunen's cabinet. That year, she gave Martti Simojoki, Archbishop of Turku, a petition with almost a million signatures advocating for the introduction of female priests. Whilst Education Minister, Väänänen implemented the rollout of the Pirkkala handout, an experiment in standardised teaching materials.

In 1982, Väänänen became the Minister of Social Affairs and Health in Kalevi Sorsa's cabinet. Whilst in the role, Väänänen supported child benefit payments, anti-alcohol policies, and the increase of provision of elderly care, particularly care homes. Her home care support bill was passed in 1985, and gave more provision for young children. Väänänen left Parliament after choosing not to contest the 1991 Finnish parliamentary election. She served for four parliamentary terms, and was seen as a controversial politician. She was nicknamed Viikate-Väänänen (Scythe Väänänen).

Aside from politics, Väänänen was a board member of Yle from 1967 to 1991. She also wrote a column for Maaseudun Tulevaisuudessa (The Rural Future) once a week for 35 years, under the pseudonym Heikintytär. In 1994, she was awarded the title of ministerin, the first woman to be bestowed the title.
