= Irma Toivanen =

Finnish politician and teacher (1922–2010)

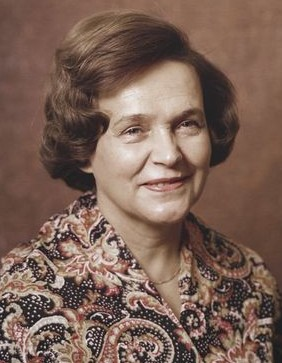
- Toivanen in 1977

Member of the Parliament of Finland
- In office 23 March 1970 – 23 March 1979
- Constituency: Turku Province South

Finland Minister of Social Affairs and Health
- In office 30 November 1975 – 15 May 1977
- Prime Minister: Martti Miettunen

Personal details
- Born: Irma Hellin Taavitsainen; 27 October 1922 Kymi, Finland
- Died: 30 July 2010 (aged 87) Turku, Finland
- Party: Liberal People's Party

Irma Hellin Toivanen (née Taavitsainen; 27 October 1922 – 30 July 2010) was a Finnish politician and teacher. She was a member of the Parliament of Finland from 1970 to 1979, representing Turku Province South as a member of the Liberal People's Party. From 1975 to 1976, she was Finland's Minister of Social Affairs and Health, appointed by then-Prime Minister Martti Miettunen.

== Early life and career ==
Irma Hellin Taavitsainen was born on 27 October 1922 in Kymi, Finland. She was the daughter of Johan Taavitsainen, a glassblower, and Hilda-Maria Kuuva. She worked as a volunteer medic during the Winter War and Continuation War between Finland and the Soviet Union, and she was active in Lotta Svärd, a Finnish voluntary auxiliary paramilitary organisation for women. Taavitsainen qualified as a primary school teacher in 1942, and continued with postgraduate studies. She worked as a teacher at various primary and secondary schools in Sääksmäki, Hämeenlinna, and Kaarina, from 1942 to 1970. In 1947, she married Aappo E. Toivanen, a rector, and they had four children.

Toivanen, who was a member of the People's Party of Finland (now the Liberals), became active during the 1960s when she was elected to the municipal council of Kaarina. She was elected to the Parliament of Finland in 1970 to represent Turku Province South (now Varsinais-Suomi), after receiving endorsements by teachers' unions as well as former Minister for Social Affairs Irma Karvikko. Toivanen was re-elected twice, serving continuously until 1979. She sat on several parliamentary committees, including Constitutional Law, Education and Culture, Finance, and the Grand Committee. In Parliament, Toivanen worked on school reform legislation and chaired the Liberal People's Party parliamentary group from 1973 to 1975. She was among the top vote-getters in the 1975 Finnish parliamentary election, and The National Biography of Finland describes her as one of her party's most prominent members of the 1970s.

Toivanen was one of the few who opposed the extension of President Urho Kekkonen's term of office by way of derogation from the beginning of March 1974 and voted against the law in January 1973 with her party colleague Olavi Borg; however, other members voted in favor of the law. From November 1975 to May 1977, Toivanen was the Minister of Social Affairs and Health in the second and third cabinets of Prime Minister Martti Miettunen. As minister, she negotiated comprehensive pension legislation and helped establish a government fund for veteran rehabilitation. During her tenure, Finland passed a 1976 law banning tobacco advertising and prohibiting the sale of tobacco to minors.

After she retired from Parliament in 1979, Toivanen chaired the woman's branch of the Liberal People's Party.

== Post-politics and death ==
In her later years, Toivanen returned to her work with Lotta Svärd. She chaired Turku's Lotta Heritage Association, which she founded, from 1994 to 2003, and she was an adviser to the 2005 drama film Promise, which was commissioned by the Lotta Svärd Foundation and depicted the organisation's World War II efforts. She received the Cross of Liberty, 2nd Class, in 2003 for her work with national defense groups.

Toivanen died on 30 July 2010 at her home in Turku, at the age of 87.

== See also ==
- List of Cabinet Ministers from Finland by ministerial portfolio
