= Sulo Suorttanen =

Finnish politician

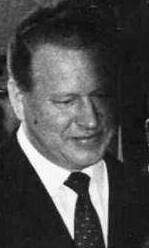
Sulo Elias Suorttanen

Sulo Elias Suorttanen (13 February 1921, Valkeala – 24 September 2005) was a Finnish lawyer, civil servant and politician. He served as Minister of Defence and at the same time Deputy Minister of the Interior from 27 May 1966 to 14 May 1970. He was a member of the Parliament of Finland from 1962 to 1970 and again from 1972 to 1975, representing the Agrarian League (which changed its name to Centre Party in 1965). He was a graduate of the University of Helsinki. During the Second World War Suorttanen served Nazi Germany in the Finnish Volunteer Battalion of the Waffen-SS as an SS-Untersturmführer.
