= Pirkko Työläjärvi =

Finnish politician (born 1938)

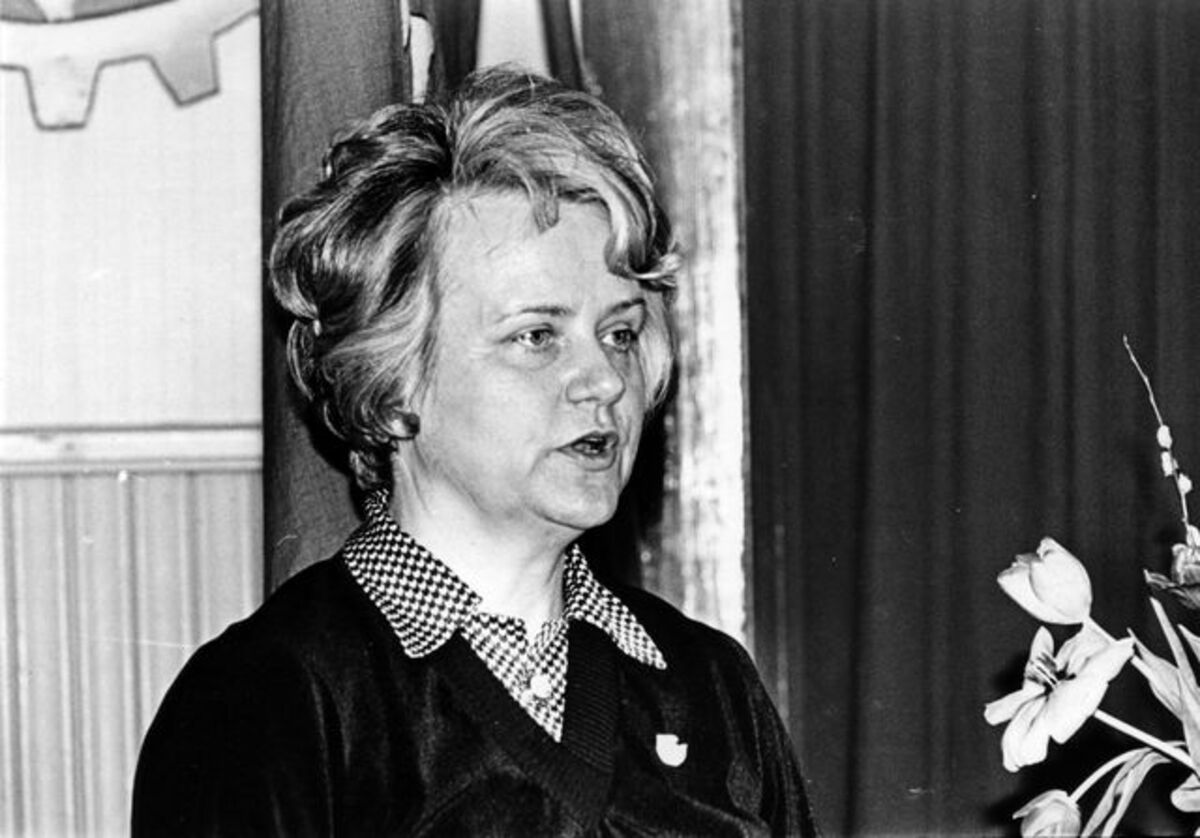
Pirkko Työläjärvi

Pirkko Työläjärvi (born 8 September 1938, Jämsä) is a Finnish politician from the Social Democratic Party.

She was member of the parliament from 1972 to 1985, and minister in several cabinets from 1975 to 1982.

After the 1979 Finnish parliamentary election, President Kekkonen offered her the position to form a cabinet, however, she refused.

She was deputy speaker of the parliament 1983–1985, In 1985 she left the parliament to take the position of the Governor of the Turku and Pori Province, which she left in 1997.

In municipality level, she was a member of Rauma city council from 1973 to 1980.
