= Valde Nevalainen =

Finnish politician (1919–1994)

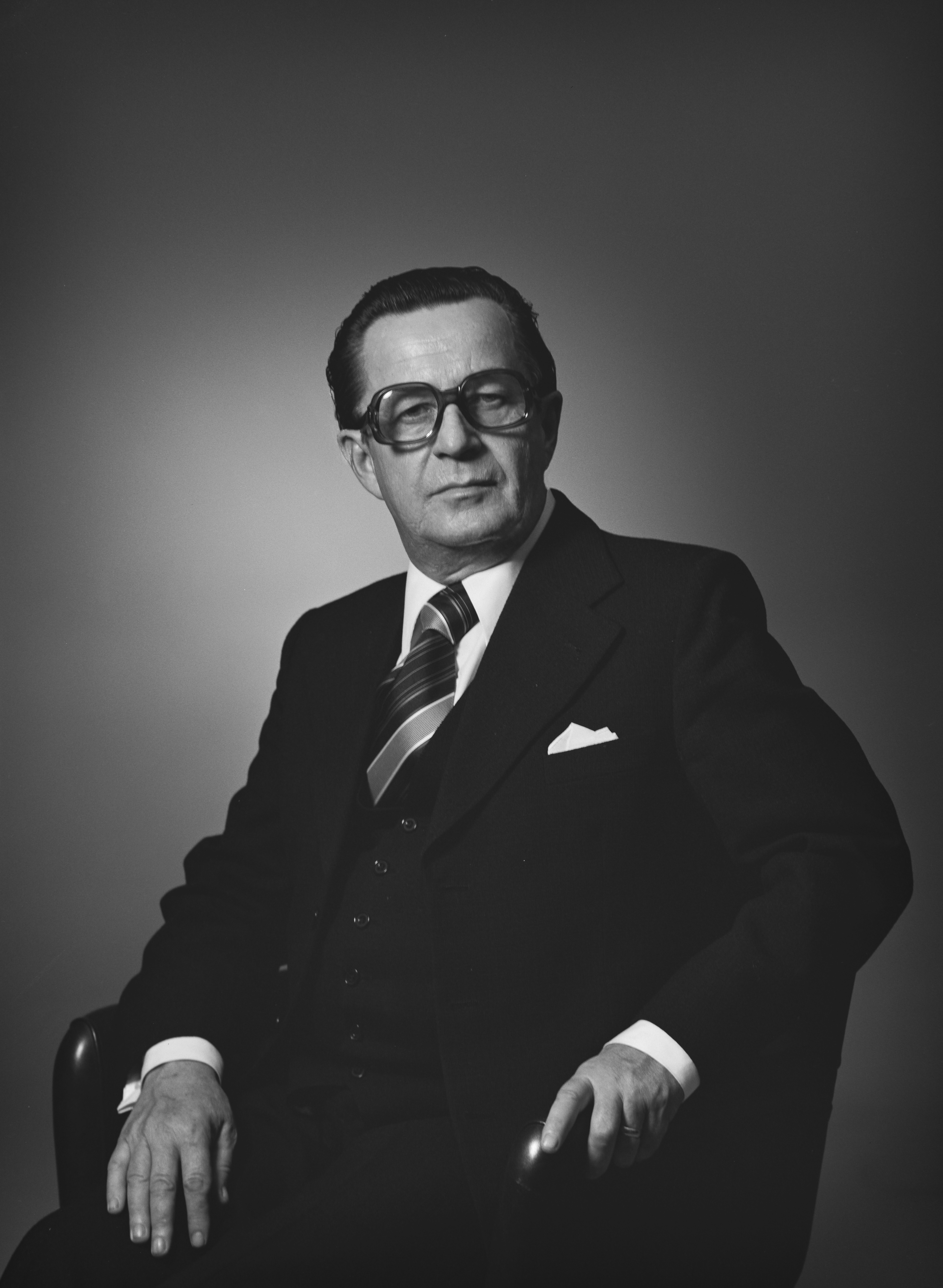
Valde Nevalainen in 1978

Valde Nestori Nevalainen (8 April 1919 – 8 February 1994) was a Finnish politician, born in Pielisjärvi. He was a member of the Parliament of Finland from 1966 to 1975, representing the Social Democratic Party of Finland (SDP). He served as Transport Minister from 23 February to 4 September 1972 and minister of Labour from 4 September 1972 to 13 June 1975.
