= Jussi Linnamo =

Finnish politician (1929–2004)

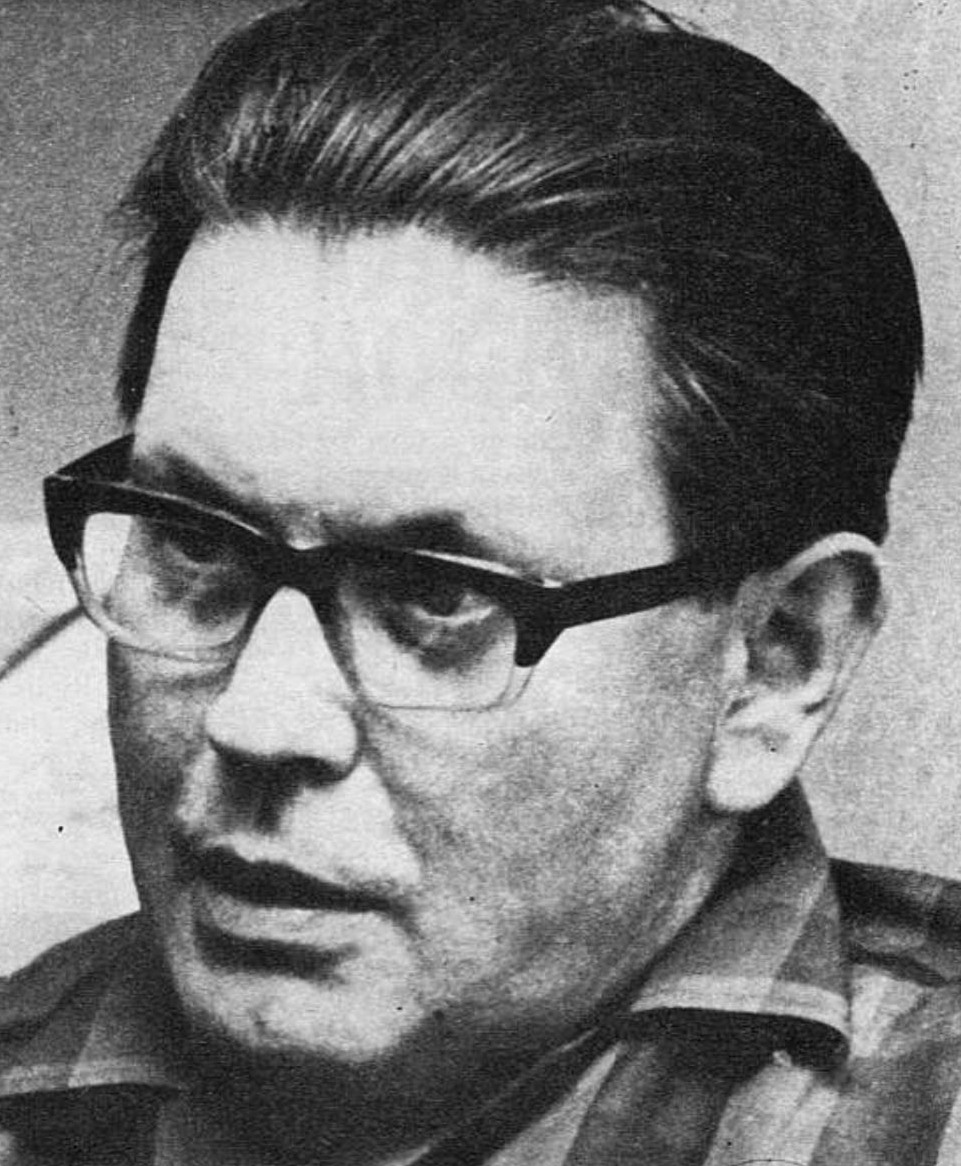

Minister of Trade and Industry
- In office 23 February 1972 – 4 September 1972
- Prime Minister: Rafael Paasio
- Preceded by: Gunnar Korhonen
- Succeeded by: Grels Teir

Deputy Minister of Foreign Affairs
- In office 23 February 1972 – 5 May 1973
- Prime Minister: Rafael Paasio; Kalevi Sorsa
- Preceded by: Reino Rossi
- Succeeded by: Jermu Laine

Personal details
- Born: 13 October 1929 Vyborg, Finland
- Died: 18 May 2004 (aged 74) Espoo, Finland
- Party: Social Democratic Party

Jussi Linnamo (13 October 1929 – 18 May 2004) was a Finnish politician. He was the Minister of Trade and Industry in 1972.

== See also ==
- List of Cabinet Ministers from Finland by ministerial portfolio
