= Keijo Liinamaa =

Finnish politician and lawyer (1929–1980)

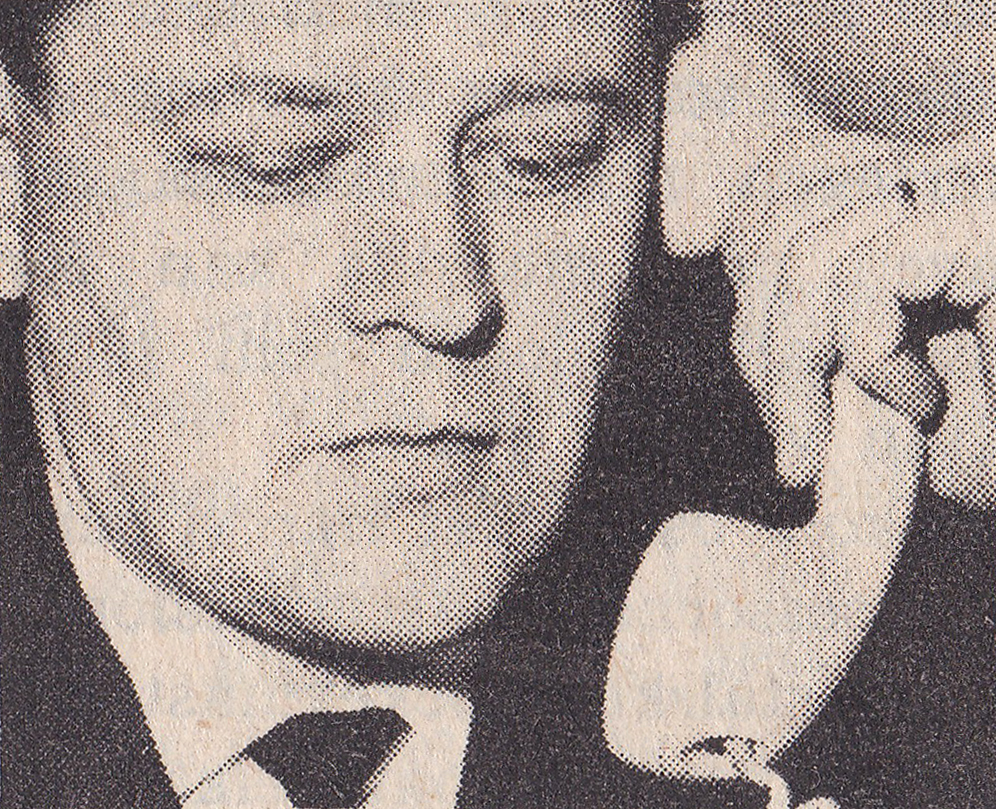

35th Prime Minister of Finland
- In office 13 June 1975 – 30 November 1975
- President: Urho Kekkonen
- Deputy: Olavi J. Mattila
- Preceded by: Kalevi Sorsa
- Succeeded by: Martti Miettunen

Minister of Labour
- In office 29 October 1971 – 23 February 1972
- Prime Minister: Teuvo Aura
- Preceded by: Veikko Helle
- Succeeded by: Veikko Helle

Minister of Justice
- In office 14 May 1970 – 15 July 1970
- Prime Minister: Teuvo Aura
- Preceded by: Aarre Simonen
- Succeeded by: Erkki Tuominen

Personal details
- Born: Keijo Antero Liinamaa; 6 April 1929 Mänttä, Finland
- Died: 28 June 1980 (aged 51) Helsinki, Finland
- Spouse: Pirkko Liinamaa
- Education: University of Helsinki
- Profession: Lawyer

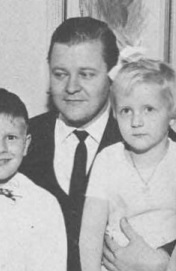
Liinamaa with his children in 1964.

Keijo Antero Liinamaa (6 April 1929 in Mänttä – 28 June 1980 in Helsinki) was a Finnish lawyer and politician who served as caretaker prime minister of Finland from June to November 1975.

Liinamaa, a lawyer specialising in labour law, began his career working for the Finnish Central Union of Trade Unions (SAK). In 1958, at only age 29, he became the town manager of Mänttä, an industrial municipality in Western Finland. Upon the creation of a nationwide labour dispute conciliation mechanism in the early 1960s, Liinamaa was appointed a regional labour dispute conciliator. In 1965 he became the National Labour Dispute Conciliator and held the post in 1965–1970 and 1979–1980.

In 1965–1967 due to turbulent economic winds, Liinamaa was faced with conciliating dozens of labour disputes. In his capacity as the National Conciliator of Finland, he was able to prevent several major strikes.

In 1967 Liinamaa was given a special task by Prime Minister Rafael Paasio: Liinamaa was to negotiate a comprehensive economical deal with employers' organisations and labour unions in order to prevent inflation due to rising wages. These negotiations resulted in the first Comprehensive Income Policy Agreement and brought fame to Liinamaa.

Radical changes in support of political parties in the parliamentary elections of 1970 led to severe political conflicts: No political coalition could be established to form a cabinet. President Urho Kekkonen appointed a caretaker cabinet headed by Teuvo Aura. Under Prime Minister Aura, Liinamaa served as the Minister of Justice for 63 days in May–July 1970, until a new coalition government was formed by Ahti Karjalainen.

Karjalainen's coalition fell in the autumn of 1971, and early parliamentary elections were called. A second caretaker cabinet led by Teuvo Aura was appointed, where Liinamaa served as Minister of Labour from October 1971 to February 1972.

Following the election of 1975, the political parties couldn't agree on terms for a coalition government. President Kekkonen appointed Keijo Liinamaa prime minister of a caretaker government that lasted from June to November 1975. Kekkonen's intervention made possible the formation of a new coalition government under Martti Miettunen in the autumn of 1975.

== Cabinets ==
- Liinamaa Cabinet

Political offices
Preceded by Kalevi Sorsa	Prime Minister of Finland; 1975	Succeeded by Martti Miettunen
