= Alli Lahtinen =

Finnish politician (1926–1976)

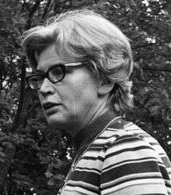
- Lahtinen in 1970

Finland Minister of Social Affairs and Health
- In office 29 October 1971 – 23 February 1972; 13 June 1975 – 30 November 1975
- Prime Minister: Teuvo Aura; Keijo Liinamaa

Personal details
- Born: Alli Kyllikki Ilomäki; 11 April 1926 Korpilahti, Finland
- Died: 22 May 1976 (aged 50) Helsinki, Finland
- Education: School of Social Sciences

Alli Kyllikki Lahtinen (née Ilomäki; 11 April 1926 – 22 May 1976) was a Finnish politician who was the minister of social affairs and health from 1971 to 1972 and from June to November 1975.

== Biography ==
Alli Kyllikki Ilomäki was born on 11 April 1926 in Korpilahti, Finland. Her father, Muisto Ilomäki, was a senior member of the Social Democratic Party. After attending secondary school in Hyvinkää, she moved to Kotka and worked for the newspaper Eteenpäin as a journalist. She later worked as a clerk for Kotka's child services department and taught Finnish and mathematics at a local school for adults. Ilomäki married Kaarlo Lahtinen, a firefighter, in 1947, and they had two sons. She received the Bachelor of Social Sciences degree from the School of Social Sciences (now the University of Tampere) in Helsinki in 1956.

In 1959, Lahtinen was appointed as director of child welfare in Kotka. She remained in the position until 1968, when she became the director-general of Finland's new National Board of Social Welfare. In this role, she was the first woman to lead a central government agency in Finland. During Lahtinen's tenure as director-general from 1968 to 1976, she advocated for legislation to improve the social safety net in Finland and helped implement a national child care system. She is described in The National Biography of Finland as a leading figure in the country's Social Democratic labour movement during the 1960s and 1970s.

Although she never ran for election to the Parliament of Finland, Lahtinen was appointed as second minister of social affairs and health by Prime Minister Teuvo Aura in May 1970, and held the position until Ahti Karjalainen became prime minister in July 1970. She was promoted to minister of social affairs and health during Aura's second term as prime minister from October 1971 to February 1972, and was re-appointed to the position during Keijo Liinamaa's caretaker government in 1975. Lahtinen was also active in the women's branch of the Social Democratic Party and was a Kotka city councillor for 14 years.

Lahtinen died on 22 May 1976 in Helsinki at the age of 50, after a sudden illness.

== See also ==
- List of Cabinet Ministers from Finland by ministerial portfolio
