= Rafael Paasio =

Finnish politician (1903–1980)

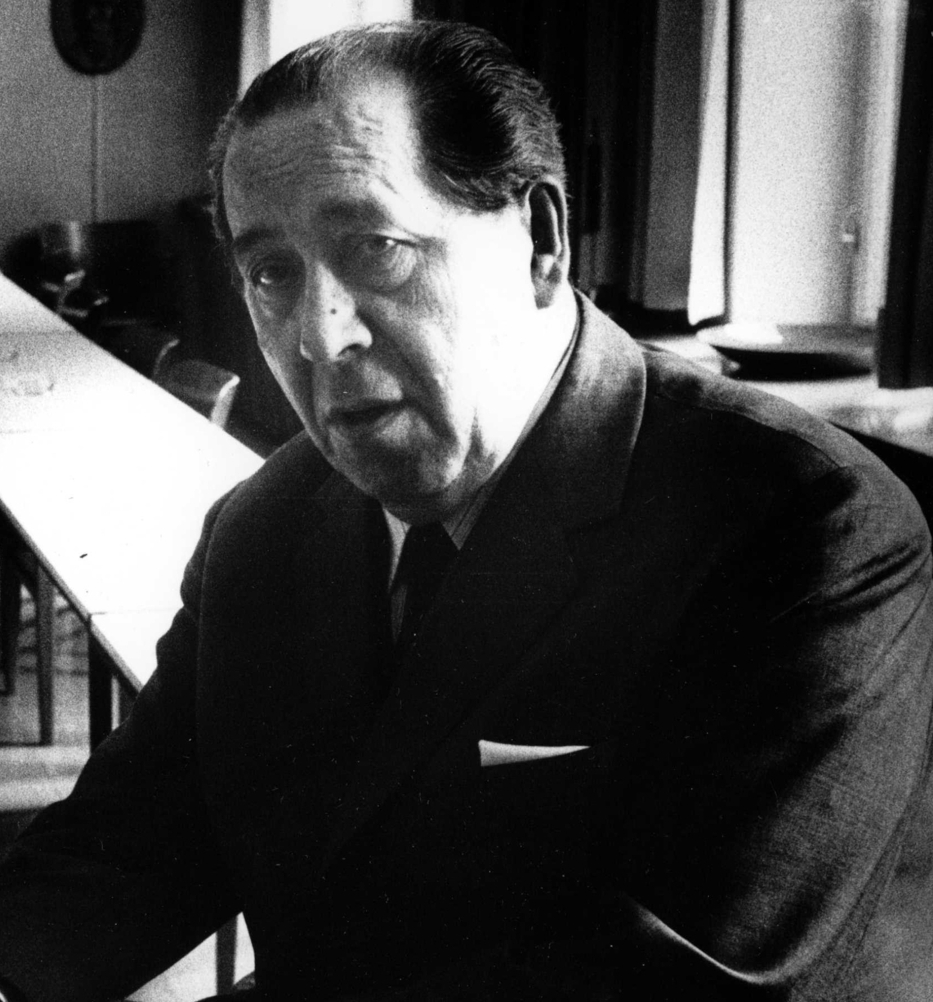
- Paasio in 1963.

31st Prime Minister of Finland
- In office 23 February 1972 – 4 September 1972
- President: Urho Kekkonen
- Deputy: Mauno Koivisto
- Preceded by: Teuvo Aura
- Succeeded by: Kalevi Sorsa
- In office 27 May 1966 – 22 March 1968
- President: Urho Kekkonen
- Deputy: Reino Oittinen
- Preceded by: Johannes Virolainen
- Succeeded by: Mauno Koivisto

Speaker of the Finnish Parliament
- In office 3 April 1970 – 29 February 1972
- Preceded by: V. J. Sukselainen
- Succeeded by: V. J. Sukselainen
- In office 14 April 1966 – 1 June 1966
- Preceded by: Karl-August Fagerholm
- Succeeded by: Johannes Virolainen

Member of the Finnish Parliament
- In office 22 July 1948 – 26 September 1975
- Constituency: Turku

Personal details
- Born: Kustaa Rafael Paasio; 6 June 1903 Uskela, now a part of Salo, Finland
- Died: 17 March 1980 (aged 76) Turku, Finland
- Party: Social Democratic
- Spouse: Mary Regina Wahlman (1907-2002)
- Children: Pertti Paasio

Kustaa Rafael Paasio, born Hellström (6 June 1903 – 17 March 1980) was a prominent Finnish politician and editor from Social Democratic Party. He served as Prime Minister of Finland twice.

Paasio was born in Uskela and was in contact with the Social Democratic Labor movement at an early age. Paasio was elected to the parliament in 1948. Before that he participated in Turku municipal politics and was since 1942 the chief of newspaper Turun Päivälehti. Paasio was the chairman of SDP from 1963 to 1975, and served as the prime minister twice, 1966-1968 and 1972, and was also twice the Speaker of the Parliament. Both his son, Pertti Paasio, and his granddaughter, Heli Paasio, have been members of the parliament.

Social Democrats remember Rafael Paasio, above all, as party unifier and strengthener. In addition, the party reached decent relations with Soviet Union during his term. Paasio positioned himself in the middle of left-wingers and right-wingers in the party. His support to Kekkonen allowed a new coming for SDP-led governments. His first cabinet began building the modern Finnish welfare state, and the second government laid the foundation for Finland's EEC agreement. Therefore, his actions had a revolutionary impact on Finnish history.

Paasio was the Social Democrat candidate in the 1962 presidential elections. He died in Turku, aged 76.

== Cabinets ==
- Paasio I Cabinet
- Paasio II Cabinet

Political offices
Preceded by Karl-August Fagerholm	Speaker of the Parliament of Finland; 1966	Succeeded by Johannes Virolainen
Preceded by Johannes Virolainen	Prime Minister of Finland; 1966–1968	Succeeded by Mauno Koivisto
Preceded by V. J. Sukselainen	Speaker of the Parliament of Finland; 1970–1972	Succeeded by V. J. Sukselainen
Preceded by Teuvo Aura	Prime Minister of Finland; 1972	Succeeded by Kalevi Sorsa
