= Esa Timonen =

Finnish politician (1925–2015)

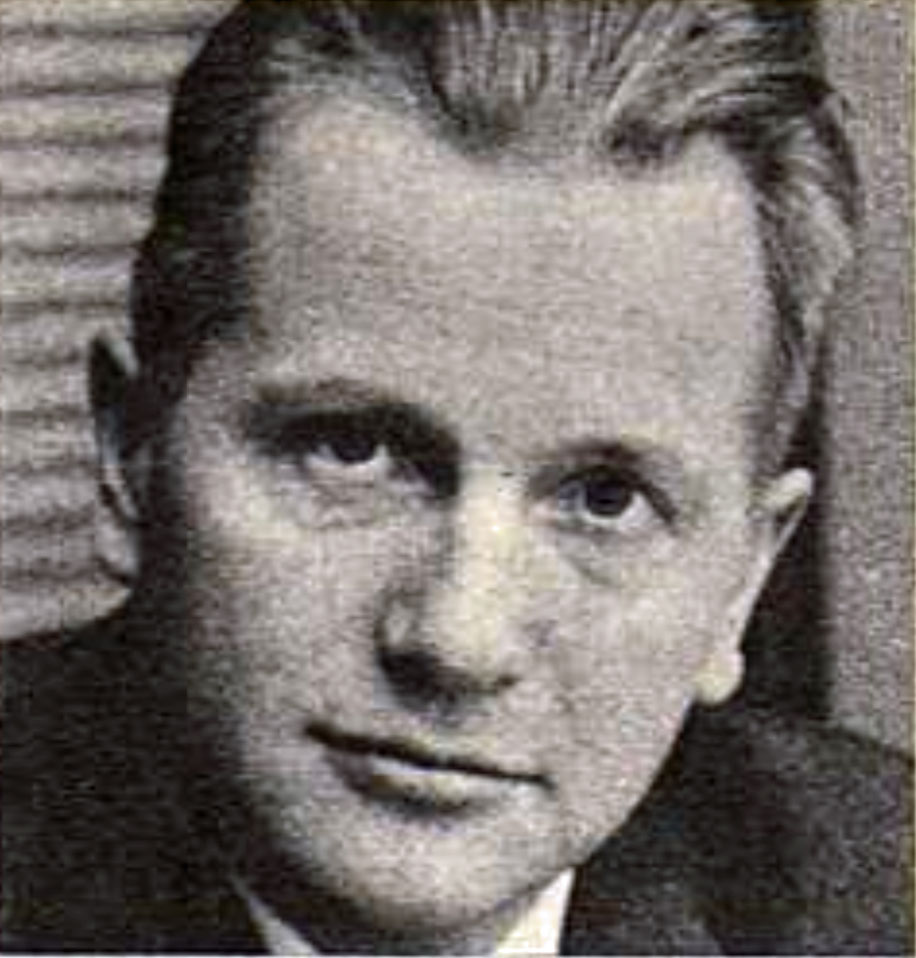

Esa Eljas Timonen (28 May 1925, Nurmes – 19 April 2015) was a Finnish politician. He served as Deputy Minister of Communications from 12 September 1964 to 27 May 1966, as Deputy Minister of Social Affairs from 27 May 1966 to 31 August 1967, as Minister of Employment from 14 May to 15 July 1970 and again from 29 October 1971 to 23 February 1972 and as Minister of Transport from 13 June to 30 November 1975. Timonen was a Member of the Parliament of Finland from 1958 to 1966, representing the Agrarian League, which renamed itself the Centre Party in 1965. He served as the governor of Northern Karelia Province from 1967 to 1992.
