= Martti Miettunen =

Finnish politician

Valtioneuvos Martti Miettunen
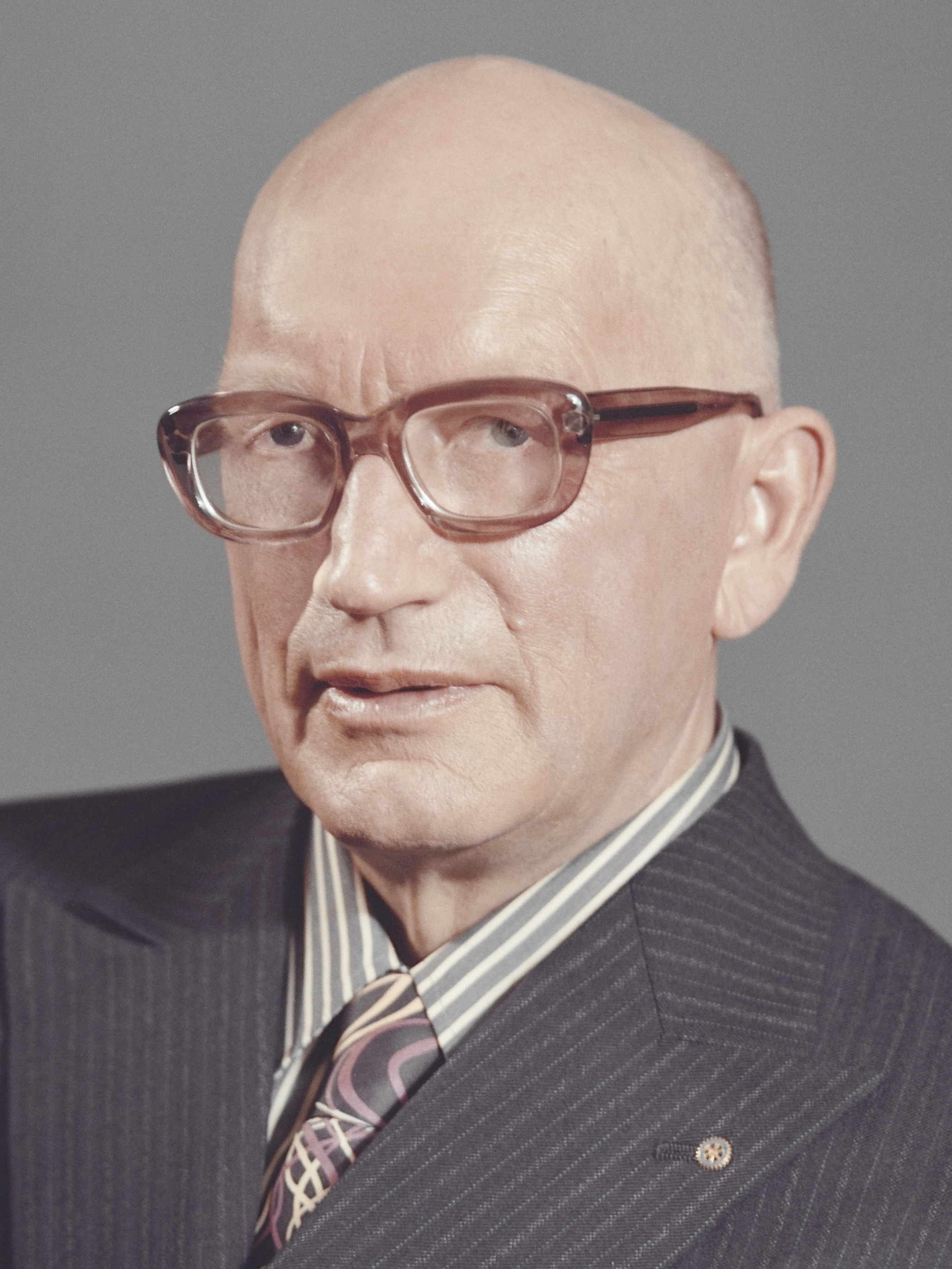
- Miettunen in 1973

27th Prime Minister of Finland
- In office 30 November 1975 – 15 May 1977
- President: Urho Kekkonen
- Deputy: Kalevi Sorsa; Ahti Karjalainen
- Preceded by: Keijo Liinamaa
- Succeeded by: Kalevi Sorsa
- In office 14 July 1961 – 13 April 1962
- President: Urho Kekkonen
- Deputy: Eemil Luukka
- Preceded by: V. J. Sukselainen
- Succeeded by: Ahti Karjalainen

Minister of Agriculture
- In office 22 March 1968 – 14 May 1970
- Prime Minister: Mauno Koivisto
- Preceded by: Nestori Kaasalainen
- Succeeded by: Nils Westermarck
- In office 29 August 1958 – 13 November 1958
- Prime Minister: Karl-August Fagerholm
- Preceded by: Pauli Lehtosalo
- Succeeded by: Urho Kähönen
- In office 3 March 1956 – 2 July 1957
- Prime Minister: Karl-August Fagerholm; V. J. Sukselainen
- Preceded by: Viljami Kalliokoski
- Succeeded by: Kusti Eskola
- In office 17 January 1951 – 17 November 1953
- Prime Minister: Urho Kekkonen
- Preceded by: Taavi Vilhula
- Succeeded by: Kalle Jutila

Minister of Transport and Public Works
- In office 5 May 1954 – 3 March 1956
- Prime Minister: Ralf Törngren; Urho Kekkonen
- Preceded by: Ralph Erik Serlachius
- Succeeded by: Eino Palovesi
- In office 17 March 1950 – 17 January 1951
- Prime Minister: Urho Kekkonen
- Preceded by: Onni Peltonen
- Succeeded by: Onni Peltonen

Minister of Finance
- In office 2 July 1957 – 29 November 1957
- Prime Minister: V. J. Sukselainen
- Preceded by: Nils Meinander
- Succeeded by: Lauri Hietanen

Personal details
- Born: Martti Juhani Miettunen; 17 April 1907 Simo, Finland
- Died: 19 January 2002 (aged 94) Kauniainen, Finland
- Party: Centre
- Spouse(s): Alli Henriikka Salovaara (m. 1962); Hilda Kaarina Kantola (1934–1961)

Martti Juhani Miettunen (17 April 1907 – 19 January 2002) was a Finnish politician who served twice as Finland's prime minister, from 1961 to 1962 and again from 1975 to 1977.

Miettunen was born in Simo, the son of a smallholder. He studied agriculture, and worked as a farmer and an agricultural advisor before entering politics. He served in Parliament as a representative for the Agrarian Party from 1945 to 1958, and then served as Governor of the Province of Lapland from 1958 to 1973. He was awarded the honorary title of Counsellor of State in 1977.

Miettunen served as a cabinet minister for 4,300 days, the eighth-longest period of service in Finnish political history. He was also known as President Urho Kekkonen's right-hand man.

He died at the age of 94 in the Kauniainen military hospital near Helsinki in early 2002.

== Cabinets ==
- Miettunen I Cabinet
- Miettunen II Cabinet
- Miettunen III Cabinet

Political offices
Preceded by Jussi Sukselainen	Prime Minister of Finland; 1961–1962	Succeeded by Ahti Karjalainen
Preceded by Keijo Liinamaa	Prime Minister of Finland; 1975–1977	Succeeded by Kalevi Sorsa
