= Fagerholm III cabinet =

Government of Finland from 1958 to 1959

Fagerholm III Cabinet
- 44th Cabinet of Finland
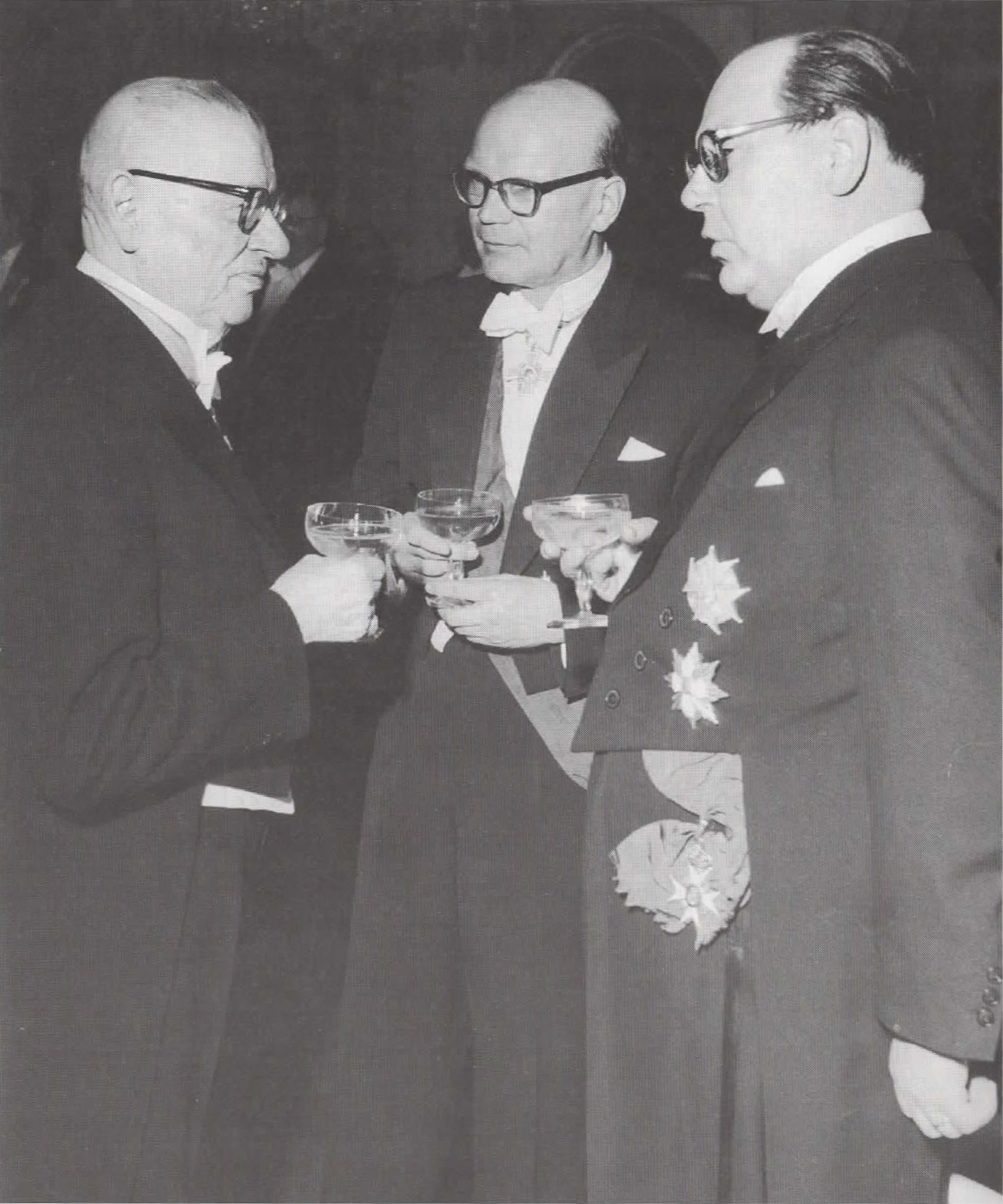
- Photo of J.K. Paasikivi (left), Urho Kekkonen (center), and Karl-August Fagerholm (right).
- Date formed: 29 August 1958
- Date dissolved: 13 January 1959

People and organisations
- President: Urho Kekkonen
- Prime Minister: Karl-August Fagerholm
- Total no. of members: 17
- Member parties: Social Democratic Party; Agrarian League; National Coalition; Swedish People's Party; People's Party
- Status in legislature: Majority government 137 / 200 (69%)
- Opposition parties: Finnish People's Democratic League; Social Democratic Opposition

History
- Outgoing formation: Night Frost Crisis
- Election: 1958 Finnish parliamentary election
- Predecessor: Kuuskoski
- Successor: Sukselainen II

Karl-August Fagerholm's third cabinet, (Note: Finnish: Fagerholmin III hallitus; Swedish: Regeringen Fagerholm III) also known as the Night Frost Cabinet or the Night Frost Government, (Note: Finnish: yöpakkashallitus; Swedish: nattfrostregering) was the 44th government of Republic of Finland, in office from August 29, 1958, to January 13, 1959. It was a majority government. The cabinet was formed after the parliamentary election of 1958.

== Background ==
Between the election of Urho Kekkonen as President in March 1956 and the 1958 elections, Finland struggled to maintain a stable government, in part due to difficulties in cooperation between the two largest parties (Kekkonen's own Agrarian League and the Social Democrats) and because every government formed since the 1954 elections had excluded the next largest parties: the left-wing Finnish People's Democratic League (SKDL), organized as a coalition of parties to the left of the Social Democrats of which the largest was the Communist Party of Finland, and the conservative National Coalition Party. Furthermore, a schism had been developing since the early 1950s within the Social Democratic Party between the right wing of the party led by Väinö Tanner, who had been a fervent anti-Soviet in his position as Minister of Foreign Affairs during the Continuation War resulting in his conviction as a "war-culprit" in the war-responsibility trials, and prominent anti-Communist Väinö Leskinen, and the left wing of the party led by party chairman Emil Skog, which supported collaboration between the SDP and the Agrarian League. This culminated in July 1957, when Tanner was elected chairman of the Social Democrats, beating Skog's bid for re-election. In response to this, the so-called Skogist faction of the SDP, who controlled the Central Organisation of Finnish Trade Unions (SAK), the Social Democratic Youth League of Finland, and the Finnish Workers' Sports Federation, split from the main parliamentary group, taking 13 representatives into opposition.

In the 1958 elections, the SKDL received the plurality of the vote (23.2%) and subsequently became the largest party in the Eduskunta with 50 of the 200 total seats. The economy was in a downturn period compared to the rapid industrial growth of 1953–1955, culminating in 1955 when the World War 2-era emergency provisions regulating economic activity expired, ending most government control of prices and wages and raising the price level of many goods and services. The general strike in 1956, led by the SAK, further damaged the public perception of economic stability, and did little to alleviate the unemployment rate at the time. Furthermore, the election of Väinö Tanner to chairman of the SDP moved the party line towards combating inflation, away from achieving full employment. Despite the communists' victory, a general air of hostility existed between the socialists at-large and the communist movement, exacerbated by the split in the SDP itself. As such, it was considered to be out of the question that the SKDL be appointed to any new government; John D. Hickerson, ambassador of the United States to Finland, wrote in a telegram to the State Department that "Communists will not be admitted to government unless President Kekkonen in effect goes nuts."

== Formation ==
Shortly after the 1958 parliamentary elections, President Kekkonen delegated the task of forming a new government to Eino Kilpi, a representative for the SKDL who had previously been the party's candidate in the 1956 presidential elections, however neither the Tannerite SDP nor the Skogite SDP opposition could accept Kilpi as prime minister. Soviet ambassador to Finland Viktor Lebedev informed Kekkonen that Moscow would favour the exclusion of leading Tannerites from whatever government would be formed, and even suggested a broad "people's front" (or "popular front") that would include the SKDL and the Skogite SDP alongside conservative parties. Despite this suggestion, it did not remain a priority for the Kremlin that an SKDL-leading government be established; only that Tannerites be excluded from the composition of the new government.

Following intermediate negotiations, the task of forming a new government fell upon then-Speaker of the Parliament Karl-August Fagerholm, a compromise candidate within the SDP who had previously served twice as prime minister in 1948 and 1956-1957 and did not have particularly strong ties to the Tanner-Leskinen wing of the party. Despite this, Fagerholm appointed the right-wing former chairman of the SAK Olavi Lindblom as a minister within the Ministry of Transport and Public Works, and Väinö Leskinen (who was, according to Fagerholm's later memoirs, displeased with his assignment, having preferred to be Minister of Transport and Public Works or Minister of Trade and Industry) as Minister of Social Affairs. Both Lindblom and Leskinen had been members of the asevelisosialistit, a right-wing anti-communist social democratic faction within the SDP during the Winter and Continuation Wars that was discredited by the Soviet Union and ultimately banned as a fascist group under the Moscow Armistice. Additionally, Fagerholm appointed National Coalition representative Niilo Kosola, son of Lapua Movement founder Vihtori Kosola, as a minister within the Ministry of Agriculture. Johannes Virolainen, who was central to the negotiations of the government's formation and would later be appointed as Deputy Prime Minister and Minister of Foreign Affairs, reportedly attempted to appeal to Tanner as SDP chairman to exclude Leskinen from the cabinet, but this was flatly rejected by Tanner, who stressed that the SDP's parliamentary group alone had the right to determine party ministers, responding: "What are you talking about, young man? We are forming the Finnish Government here, not the Soviet one." Virolainen had been warned by Kekkonen about going into the same government as Leskinen. On August 29, Kekkonen said after appointing the new government: "This was the worst speech I have ever given, but at least it was not written by me."

== Night Frost Crisis ==
Soviet ambassador to Finland Viktor Lebedev had himself taken an active role in the formation of the new government by acting as a middleman between the Kremlin and various Finnish politicians, especially Kekkonen, to convey the suggestions and requests of Moscow in regards to the new cabinet's composition. However, after the government had been fully formed and appointed, the Soviet Union noticed that the right wing of the SDP, represented by Lindblom and Leskinen, had been given ministerial positions even after Lebedev had informed the politicians that this would be looked down upon. The inclusion of Niilo Kosola only made matters worse, as the Soviets had associated the Kosola name with the fascist Lapua Movement within their publications. Finally, the 40th anniversary celebrations of the Communist Party of Finland were held at the end of August, however no visa was issued to the Soviet delegation's original member Otto Ville Kuusinen, who had led the Terijoki Government puppet regime during the Winter War and was thus seen as a traitor to Finland. Despite this decision being made during the Kuuskoski Cabinet, Foreign Minister Virolainen received the brunt of the blame, and the Fagerholm government was even denounced in Pravda, the official newspaper of the Communist Party of the Soviet Union. Ambassador Lebedev had also failed to make a courtesy call to Virolainen after the cabinet's appointment.

The extent of Soviet pressure on Finland after the appointment of the cabinet was initially economic in nature: negotiations regarding the use of the Saimaa Canal were suspended on grounds that Finland had failed to live up to its side of the agreement and trade deals were held up. Later, Ambassador Lebedev was returned to Moscow and transferred to other duties with no plans to appoint a successor.

== Ministers ==
Key

- ^{RES} Resigned

Portfolio	Minister	Took office	Left office	Party
Prime Minister	Karl-August Fagerholm	August 29, 1958	January 13, 1959	Social Democratic
Deputy Prime Minister	Johannes Virolainen	August 29, 1958	December 12, 1958 ^{RES}	Agrarian
Deputy Prime Minister	Onni Hiltunen	December 12, 1958	January 13, 1959	Social Democratic
Minister of Foreign Affairs	Johannes Virolainen	August 29, 1958	December 4, 1958 ^{RES}	Agrarian
Minister of Foreign Affairs	Karl-August Fagerholm	December 4, 1958	January 13, 1959	Social Democratic
Minister of Justice	Sven Högström	August 29, 1958	January 13, 1959	Swedish People's
Minister of the Interior	Atte Pakkanen	August 29, 1958	January 13, 1959	Agrarian
Minister of Defence	Toivo Wiherheimo	August 29, 1958	January 13, 1959	National Coalition
Minister of Finance	Päiviö Hetemäki	August 29, 1958	January 13, 1959	National Coalition
Minister at the Ministry of Finance	Mauno Jussila	August 29, 1958	January 13, 1959	Agrarian
Minister of Education	Kaarlo Kajatsalo	August 29, 1958	January 13, 1959	People's
Minister of Agriculture	Martti Miettunen	August 29, 1958	November 14, 1958 ^{RES}	Agrarian
Minister of Agriculture	Urho Kähönen	November 14, 1958	January 13, 1959	Agrarian
Minister at the Ministry of Agriculture	Niilo Kosola	August 29, 1958	January 13, 1959	National Coalition
Minister of Transport and Public Works	Kusti Eskola	August 29, 1958	January 13, 1959	Agrarian
Minister at the Ministry of Transport and Public Works	Olavi Lindblom	August 29, 1958	January 13, 1959	Social Democratic
Minister of Trade and Industry	Onni Hiltunen	August 29, 1958	January 13, 1959	Social Democratic
Minister at the Ministry of Transport and Public Works	Toivo Wiherheimo	August 29, 1958	January 13, 1959	National Coalition
Minister of Social Affairs	Väinö Leskinen	August 29, 1958	January 13, 1959	Social Democratic
Minister at the Ministry of Social Affairs	Rafael Paasio	August 29, 1958	January 13, 1959	Social Democratic

Preceded by Reino Kuuskoski's cabinet	Cabinet of Finland; August 29, 1958 – January 13, 1959	Succeeded by Vieno Johannes Sukselainen's second cabinet
