= Finnish Security and Intelligence Service =

National security and intelligence agency of Finland

- Suojelupoliisi (Finnish), Skyddspolisen (Swedish)

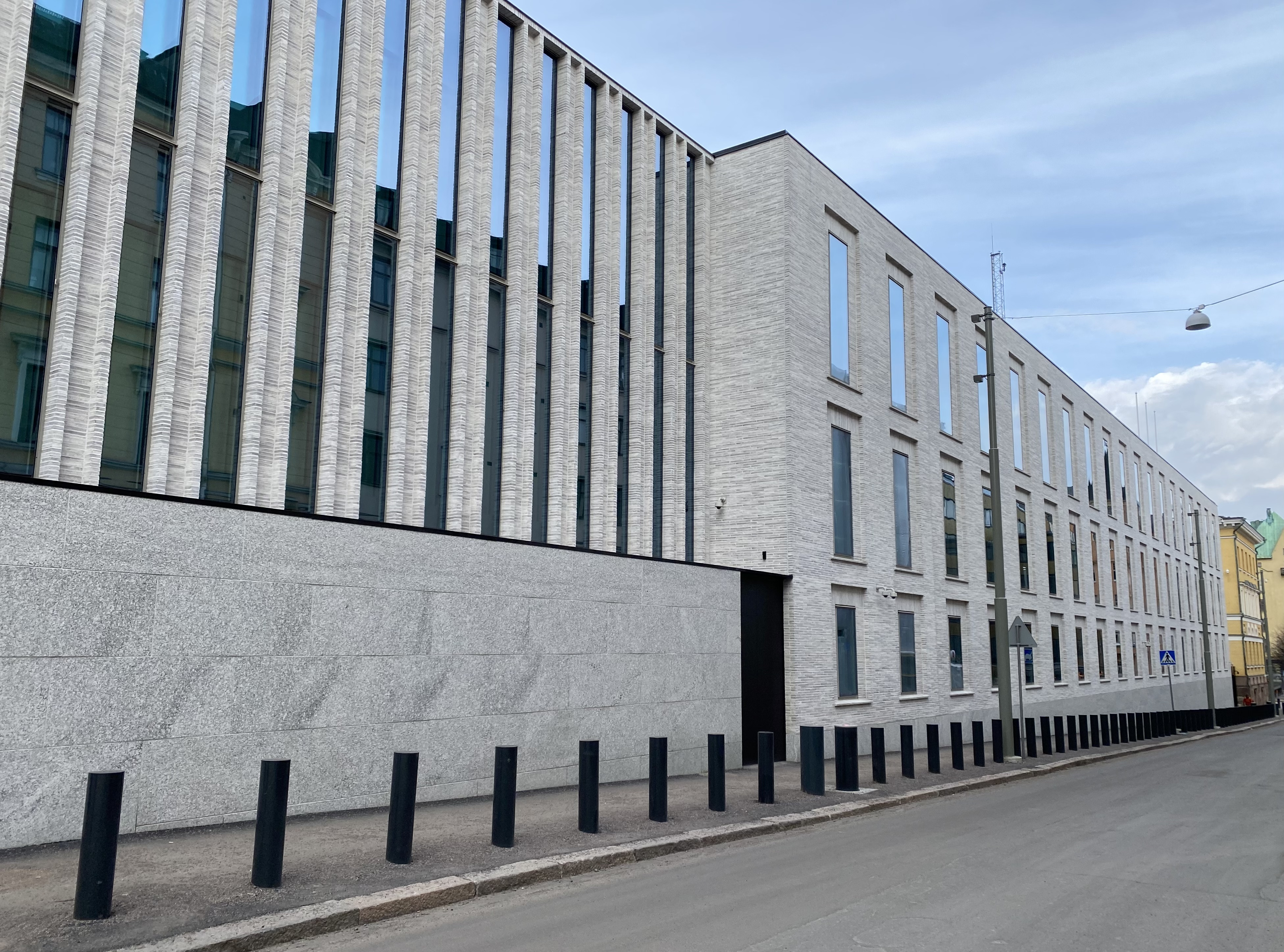
- Headquarters in Kaartinkaupunki, Helsinki

Agency overview
- Formed: 17 December 1948; 77 years ago
- Preceding agency: State Police
- Jurisdiction: Finland
- Headquarters: Fabianinkatu 2, Helsinki; 60°10′2″N 24°57′37″E
- Employees: 584 (2024)
- Annual budget: €64.7 million (2024)
- Minister responsible: Mari Rantanen, Minister of the Interior
- Agency executive: Juha Martelius, Director
- Parent department: Ministry of the Interior
- Website: supo.fi

The Finnish Security and Intelligence Service (Finnish: Suojelupoliisi, Supo; Swedish: Skyddspolisen, Skypo), formerly the Finnish Security Police and Finnish Security Intelligence Service, is the security and intelligence agency of Finland in charge of national security, such as counter-intelligence and counter-terrorism, under the jurisdiction of the Ministry of the Interior. The agency had a distinct role during the Cold War in monitoring communists as well as in the balance between Finnish independence and Soviet appeasement. After the 1990s, Supo has focused more on countering terrorism and in the 2010s, on preventing hybrid operations.

== History ==
=== During the Cold War ===
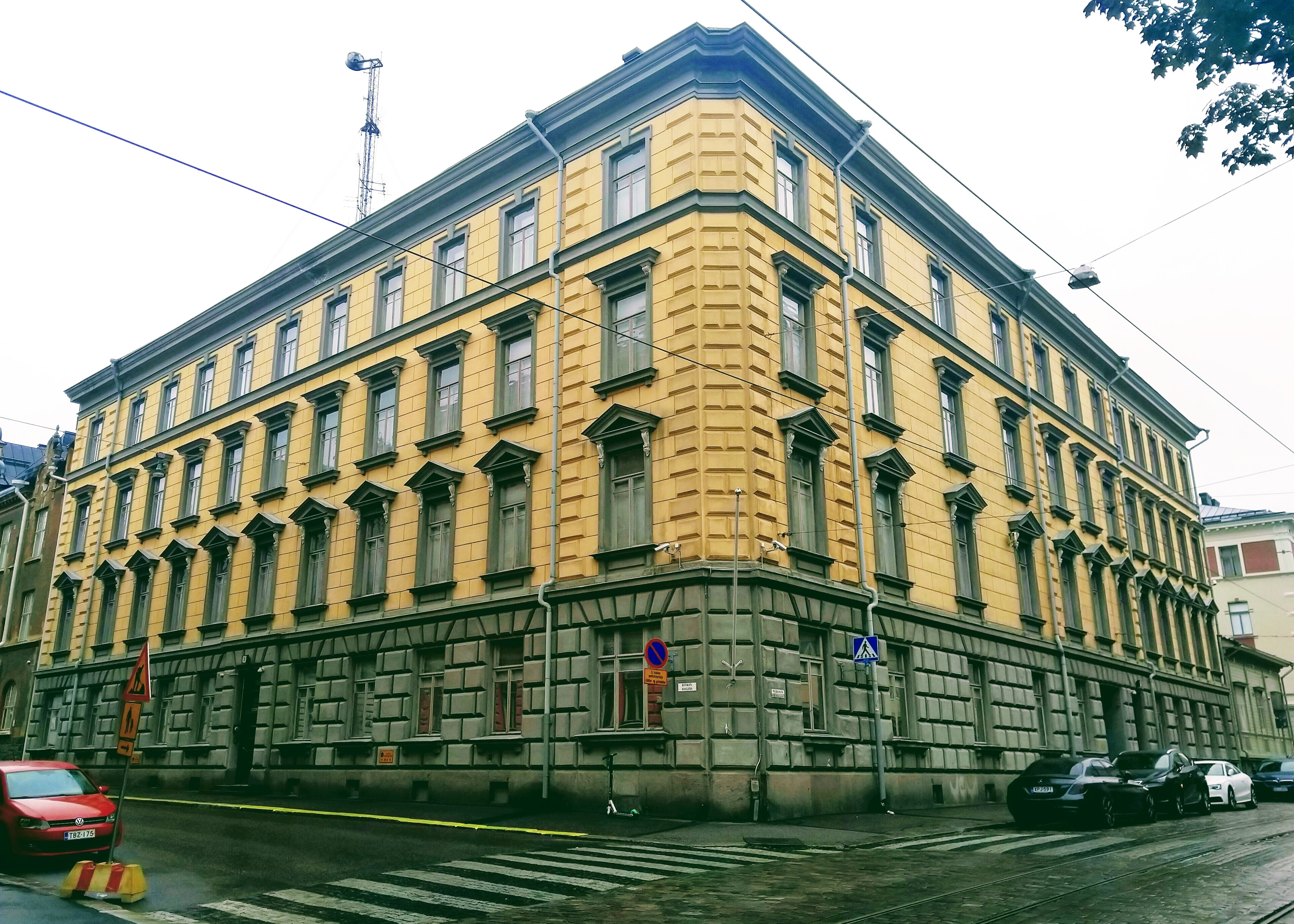
The former headquarters of the Finnish Security and Intelligence Service in Punavuori, Helsinki

The Finnish Security and Intelligence Service (Supo) was established on 17 December 1948 upon ratification of the Act and the Decree on the Security Police and became operational at the start of 1949. Supo was formed to replace its predecessor, the State Police (Valtiollinen poliisi, Valpo), after communists suffered a defeat in the July 1948 parliamentary elections and the reorganization of Valpo was recommended by a governmental committee in October 1948. In essence, Valpo was abolished by the Parliament of Finland due to the fact that its leadership positions had been filled by communists who were implicated in erroneous and illegal elements according to a separate governmental committee investigation as well as linked to a number of disappearances in the aftermath of World War II.

Old badge of Finnish Security and Intelligence Service

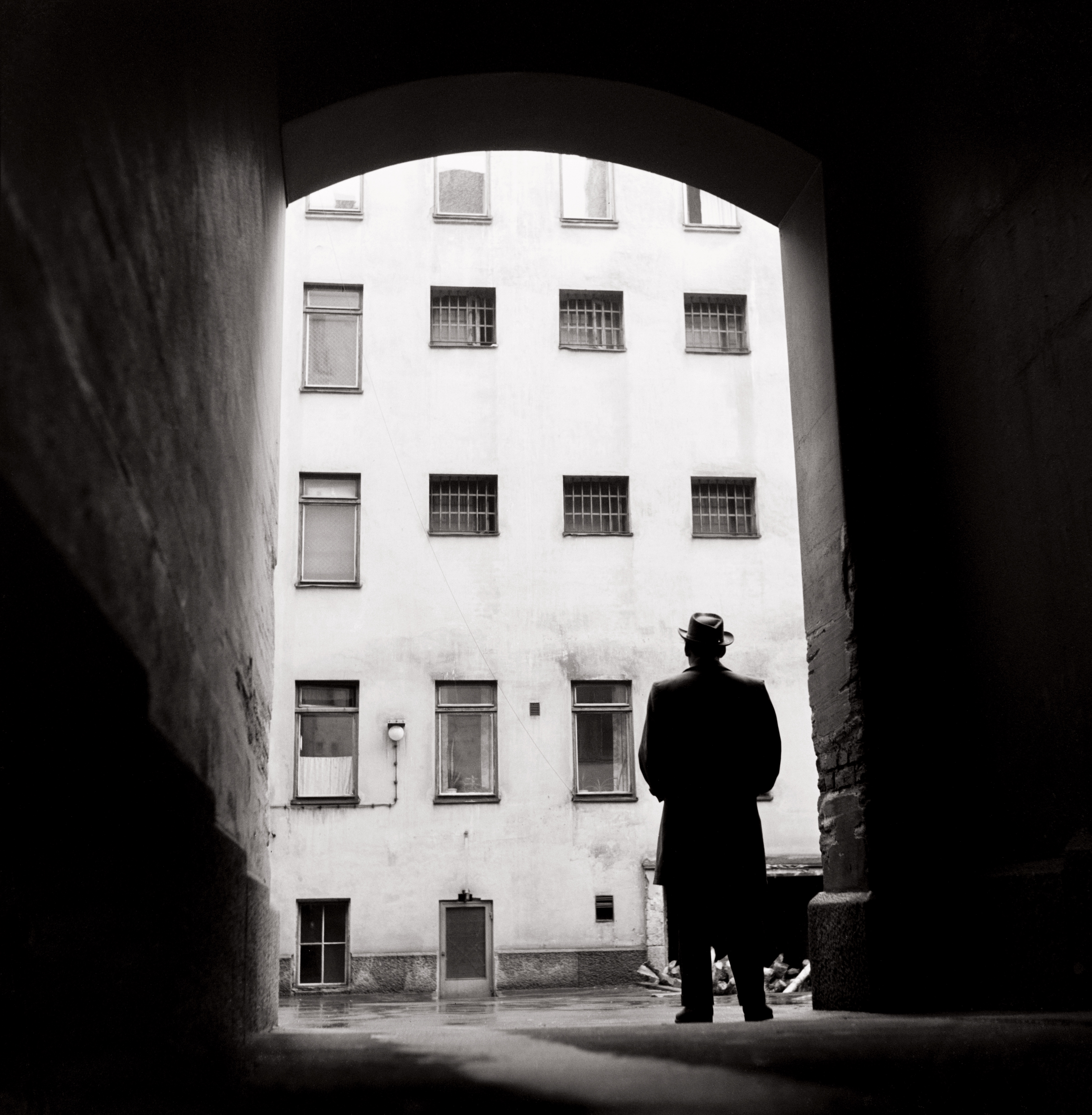
Ratakatu 12 in 1957

In general, Finland is described as having been in a strategic and neutral position between the Cold War blocks; both sides engaged in intensive intelligence activities in the country. Mostly, Finland was an interest to the superpowers as a buffer zone and as an overflight and military transit route. During the first decades, the main tasks of Supo were to monitor communists, such as the Communist Party of Finland and home Russians, and prevent illegal intelligence, especially KGB and GRU espionage. The Service had to work with discretion and caution due to Finlandization—a balance between the independence of Finland and appeasement to the Soviet Union. At the same time, Supo had close connections with the CIA—although the Service was wary of recording it on paper.

When Urho Kekkonen was elected the President of Finland in 1956, Supo started to transform more into a "presidential police" that gathered information to support the President's domestic and foreign policy decision-making. The shift was partly due to the tense Finnish-Soviet relations at the time (see e.g. the night frost and note crises) as well as Kekkonen's motivation to steer the high-profile Service into alignment with his tactics in handling relations with the Soviet Union. For example, Kekkonen was kept informed of Finnish communist politicians and their internal discussions as well as was relayed information from foreign intelligence agencies, such as the British MI6. After Director Armas Alhava retired in 1972, Kekkonen appointed Arvo Pentti as the new Director—an ally and a fellow politician from the Centre Party. When Seppo Tiitinen was appointed the new Director in 1978, Kekkonen was still requesting information on political communist movements.

Kekkonen kept KGB connections close, especially its local Helsinki chief, and utilized back channels to balance between Western and Soviet interests without provocation, such as during the negotiations on Finland's membership to the European Free Trade Association in 1962. Similarly, he shifted Supo's counter-intelligence activities to quiet and preventive action. For example, espionage cases were sometimes not submitted to court and KGB diplomats were not declared persona non grata, but instead were quietly asked to leave. When KGB major Anatoliy Golitsyn defected to the United States from Helsinki in December 1961, he divulged his knowledge and opinions on KGB networks and interaction in Finland to the CIA. For example, he described President Kekkonen as being "in Soviet service" – Kekkonen was relieved when the CIA and Western intelligence took the claim with reservations. Nevertheless, the revelations prompted Western intelligence to have a more constructive and positive attitude towards Finland and the CIA shared Golitsyn's list of KGB intelligence officers to Supo for monitoring.

Systematic surveillance of communists was shut down in the early 1980s by President Mauno Koivisto. The Service did not gain powers of arrest and pre-trial investigation powers until 1 January 1989 due to its predecessors' colourful actions and history as well as Finland's sensitive foreign policy position. Instead, the National Bureau of Investigation carried out actual criminal investigations until that point. In 1990, West German intelligence gave Supo the Tiitinen list, which supposedly contains names of Finns who were believed to have links to Stasi, the East German state security ministry. The list was classified and locked in a safe after Director Seppo Tiitinen and President Mauno Koivisto determined that it was based on vague hints instead of hard evidence. Subsequently, in 2002 the Service suspected and questioned Finnish diplomat, Alpo Rusi, of being a Stasi spy. The investigation eventually leaked to national broadcaster Yle. However, Rusi was cleared of all charges in 2007 after court proceedings and won compensation for damage to his reputation suffered when the case was leaked to the media.

=== After the Cold War ===
Former logo of the Finnish Security and Intelligence Service

The Service made a legislative initiative in 2012 to criminalize the espionage of exiles in Finland. As of April 2019, espionage of exiles was forbidden e.g. in Sweden, but not in Finland. On 1 January 2016, Supo was transferred under the direct control of the Interior Ministry from the National Police Board. Reportedly, the administrative transfer was to ensure that the Service is able to more efficiently conduct its special missions as well as to reinforce its strategic and political direction and clarify its official position both domestically and internationally. Newspapers reported in November 2016 that Supo was concerned about suspicious land and property transactions made by foreign nationals that could be utilized in hybrid operations, such as to accommodate unmarked military troops. A new bill was in process in October 2017 to allow for security authorities to monitor purchases by entities from outside the European Union (EU) buying property near military installations or broadcast towers in Finland as well as for the State to reclaim or buy strategically important property. The Service was involved in investigating the Turku stabbing of August 2017, which is considered Finland's first suspected terrorist attack since the end of World War II.

On 24 August 2026, Finnish tabloid Iltalehti reported that the Finnish government is considering transferring Supo from the Ministry of the Interior to the Ministry of Foreign Affairs and changing the name of Supo to Suomen Tiedustelupalvelu (Finlands Underrättelsetjänst in Swedish) or the "Finnish Intelligence Agency". However, the final decision will be left to the next government. The report states the change is being considered to better reflect the organization's increasing role in gathering foreign intelligence abroad (particularly in regards to increasing Russian hybrid operations and gray zone warfare activities in Finland and Europe in the 2020s) and to allow Finnish intelligence operatives to operate under more varied cover identities and front organizations, such as through diplomatic channels, similar to the intelligence agencies of other countries, particularly the SIS of the United Kingdom and the CIA of the United States. The proposed name change is also motivated in part because the current name "Suojelupoliisi", which translates literally to "Protection Police", is seen as problematic, as it has often caused confusion during collaboration with allied intelligence agencies, with Finnish intelligence agents often being confused for policemen when operating abroad.

Writing in an opinion piece in Hufvudstadsbladet in late August 2026, Finnish journalist Torsten Fagerholm commented that this reform is very necessary given the increased threat from Russia (see Finland–Russia relations § 2022–present) and how Supo since the Police Act of 2019 was adopted no longer handles any domestic law enforcement and is purely an intelligence service with a three-fold task of intelligence gathering, counterespionage and counter-terrorism. He also commented that Supo is starved of funding in its current position under the Ministry of the Interior, where it is forced to compete with the actual police for funding. Because of that, according to Fagerholm, Supo pales in comparison to its contemporary equivalents in neighboring Sweden, Norway, Denmark and even those of the Baltic states, all of whom reacted swiftly to the beginning of the 2022 Russian invasion of Ukraine by considerably restructuring, streamlining and expanding their operations. Fagerholm stated that Finland is lagging behind in both funding, personnel and expertise for both foreign and domestic intelligence and that Helsinki is still "in the starting pits, if even that".

== Function and organization ==
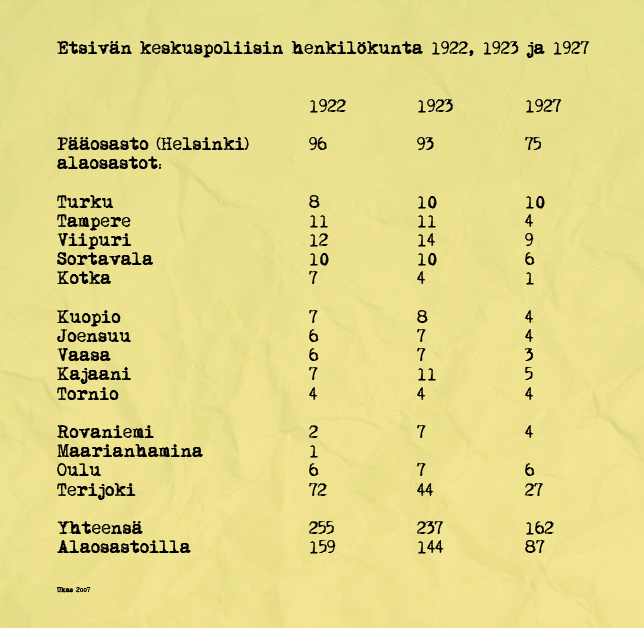
Etsivä keskuspoliisi (EK; Detective Central Police) was the Finnish state secret police that operated between 1919 and 1938. It was an early predecessor of today's Supo. The Detective Central Police dedicated itself especially to anti-communist activities. Number of personnel from 1922 to 1927.

=== Function ===
The Finnish Security and Intelligence Service states that its core functions are counter-intelligence, counter-terrorism and other national security-related work, such as counter-proliferation activities intended to impede the proliferation of weapons of mass destruction. It is tasked to prevent events that may cause danger to government systems, parliamentary democracy, or internal and external security of the State. Additionally, the Service is the responsible authority for national and international cooperation in the fight against terrorism, for preparing and maintaining terrorist threat assessments, for monitoring extremist phenomena, and for performing security clearances for personnel recruited into sensitive positions. Supo reports to other security authorities and the Government of Finland on its activities. According to the Police Act, Supo can utilize, among others, traffic data monitoring, covert intelligence gathering, undercover activities, pseudo purchases, and controlled delivery to fulfill its missions.

=== Organization ===
Supo is a national police unit subordinate to the Ministry of the Interior. It follows a Nordic tradition where the intelligence agency is governed as a part of police organisations (i.e. in the form of a security police) instead of being a separate organisation. The Service formerly used the English title Finnish Security Police; the word "police" was amended in 2010 to emphasize the agency's role in security intelligence. In 2019, the Service had 440 employees, of whom 56% were police officers and 40% women, and a total budget of 50.9 million euros. In addition to its headquarters in Punavuori, Helsinki, Supo hosts eight regional offices around Finland in Turku, Tampere, Vaasa, Lappeenranta, Joensuu, Kuopio, Oulu and Rovaniemi. Supo has liaison officers posted at diplomatic missions in Nairobi, Kenya and Ankara, Turkey as well as at the European Union (EU) Intelligence and Situation Centre. The Service is divided into seven different departments as of a 2017 reorganization:

- Collection
- Counter-Intelligence
- Terrorism and Extremism
- Regions
- Vetting
- Intelligence Analysis
- Internal Services

== See also ==
- Cold War II
- European Centre of Excellence for Countering Hybrid Threats
- Finnish Defence Intelligence Agency
- Finnish Intelligence Division
- Law enforcement in Finland
- National Bureau of Investigation (Finland)
- Police of Finland
- Finnish Border Guard
- Finnish Defence Forces

== Notes and references ==
=== Notes ===
The source Ratakatu 12: Suojelupoliisi 1949-2009 was "commissioned by Supo, but it was mainly written by professional historians". The book is considered the most definite source and the official history of Supo, but it has been criticized by diplomat Alpo Rusi and reporter Jarko Tirkkonen for not discussing certain parts of the Service's history. On the other hand, politician Erkki Tuomioja praised the book of its high quality. Tirronen and Tuomioja attribute two-thirds of the book to political history professor Kimmo Rentola—who worked for Supo as a historian while writing the book. Rentola has written that caution and source criticism are required when researching histories of security agencies due to the ambiguous and often lacking material.
