= Vilkuna =

Vilkuna is a Finnish surname. Notable people with the surname include:

- Asko Vilkuna (1929–2014), Finnish ethnologist
- Kustaa Vilkuna (1902–1980), Finnish ethnologist
