= Night Frost Crisis =

1958 Soviet–Finnish political crisis

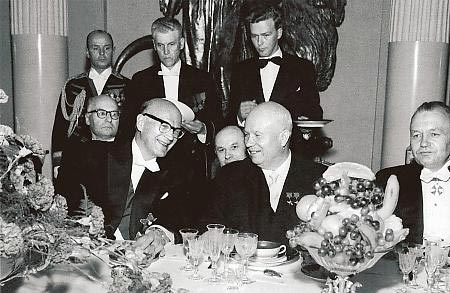
Urho Kekkonen (seated, centre-left) with Nikita Khrushchev (seated, centre-right), celebrating Kekkonen's 60th birthday in 1960.

The Night Frost Crisis (Finnish: yöpakkaskriisi) or the Night Frost (Finnish: yöpakkaset, Swedish: nattfrosten, Russian: Ночные заморозки, romanized: Nochnye zamorozki) was a political crisis that occurred in Soviet–Finnish relations in the autumn of 1958. It arose from Soviet dissatisfaction with Finnish domestic policy and in particular with the composition of the third government to be formed under Prime Minister Karl-August Fagerholm. As a result of the crisis, the Soviet Union withdrew its ambassador from Helsinki and put pressure on the Finnish government to resign. The crisis was given its name by Nikita Khrushchev, who declared that relations between the countries had become subject to a "night frost".

== Background ==
The crisis erupted in August 1958 when the recently appointed Fagerholm government failed to gain the approval of the Soviet Union. Moscow could not accept that Väinö Leskinen and Olavi Lindblom, who represented the right wing of the country's Social Democratic Party, were in government with the approval of Väinö Tanner, the leader of the Social Democratic Party, himself considered a traitor in the Soviet Union for his activities during the Winter War. The Soviet Union also associated the name of Niilo Kosola, National Coalition Party representative and the Minister for Agriculture, with his father Vihtori Kosola, who had been the leader of the far-right 1930s Lapua Movement (Lapuan liike). To make matters worse, the Finnish People's Democratic League (Suomen Kansan Demokraattinen Liitto) was excluded from the government in spite of their success in the parliamentary elections.

Johannes Virolainen, who had been centrally involved in forming the government and who became the Minister of Foreign Affairs, tried at the last moment to appeal to Väinö Tanner not to accept Väinö Leskinen into the government, to which Tanner replied: "What are you talking about, young man? We are forming the Finnish Government here, not the Soviet one." President Urho Kekkonen had already warned Virolainen about going to the same government with Leskinen. After declaring the government on 29 August, Kekkonen said his famous quote: "This was the worst speech I have ever given, but at least it was not written by me."

In addition to the previous one, the 40th anniversary of the Communist Party of Finland was held at the end of August. However, no visa was issued to Soviet Union delegation's original member Otto Ville Kuusinen, the head of the Winter War period Terijoki Government, who was marked by the Finns as a traitor. The reason for this was pushed into the neck of the Foreign Minister of the Fagerholm III Government, Johannes Virolainen, although the decision was made by the predecessor, the Kuuskoski Government together with President Urho Kekkonen. Nikita Khrushchev had also understood Kuusinen's rejection of his visa, but the official newspaper of the Communist Party of the Soviet Union, Pravda, nevertheless used the case as a weapon against the Fagerholm government.

== Development ==
The Soviet pressure on Finland was initially economic in nature: the negotiations over the use of the Saimaa Canal were suspended, the treaty on fishing rights in the Gulf of Finland was postponed, and trade negotiations were held up.

During the autumn, Moscow began exerting pressure at the political level as well. In October, the Soviet ambassador to Finland, Viktor Lebedev, went on "a vacation”, failing to visit the foreign minister, Johannes Virolainen, as protocol required, and it was subsequently announced that he had been transferred to other duties with no plans to appoint a successor. In November, the Agrarian League (Maalaisliitto) forced its ministers to resign from the government and President Urho Kekkonen began manoeuvering to bring down the government. Finally, on December 4, Virolainen announced that he was resigning and shortly after Fagerholm announced the resignation of the entire government. On January 13, 1959, Kekkonen went on state radio and TV to announce the formation of an Agrarian minority government led by V. J. Sukselainen.

The crisis attracted international attention. In a meeting brokered by the then head of the body representing Finnish industries, Johan Nykopp, United States Democratic Senator Hubert Humphrey met President Kekkonen in November 1958 while the American was on his way to Moscow and offered Finland economic support to relieve the Soviet pressure. The Finnish Foreign Ministry found itself in a difficult position and ultimately declined the offer of help, fearing that it would do more harm than good, not least to Finland's international reputation.

== Resolution ==
The Night Frost Crisis was resolved during a private trip Urho and Sylvi Kekkonen made to Leningrad in January 1959, where he "accidentally" met Nikita Khrushchev and Foreign Minister Andrei Gromyko. During the lunch that followed the negotiations, Khrushchev declared that whilst Finland had the right to decide on its governments, the Soviet Union also had the right to decide what it thinks about them. It was President Kekkonen's considered opinion that the Night Frost Crisis was caused by the internal disputes within the Social Democratic Party. On February 3, 1959, diplomatic relations between the countries were restored when the Soviet Union appointed Alexey Zakharov as the new ambassador to Finland.

== Consequences ==
As a result of his handling of the international crisis, Urho Kekkonen's position as leader of Finnish domestic policy was strengthened. Over the next twenty years, Kekkonen determined the composition of Finnish governments and neither a party nor an individual could enter the government without his say-so. Historians still dispute Kekkonen's motives for bringing down the Fagerholm government.

== See also ==
- Finlandization
- Note Crisis
- Paasikivi–Kekkonen doctrine
