= Finno-Soviet Treaty of 1948 =

1948 treaty between Finland and the Soviet Union

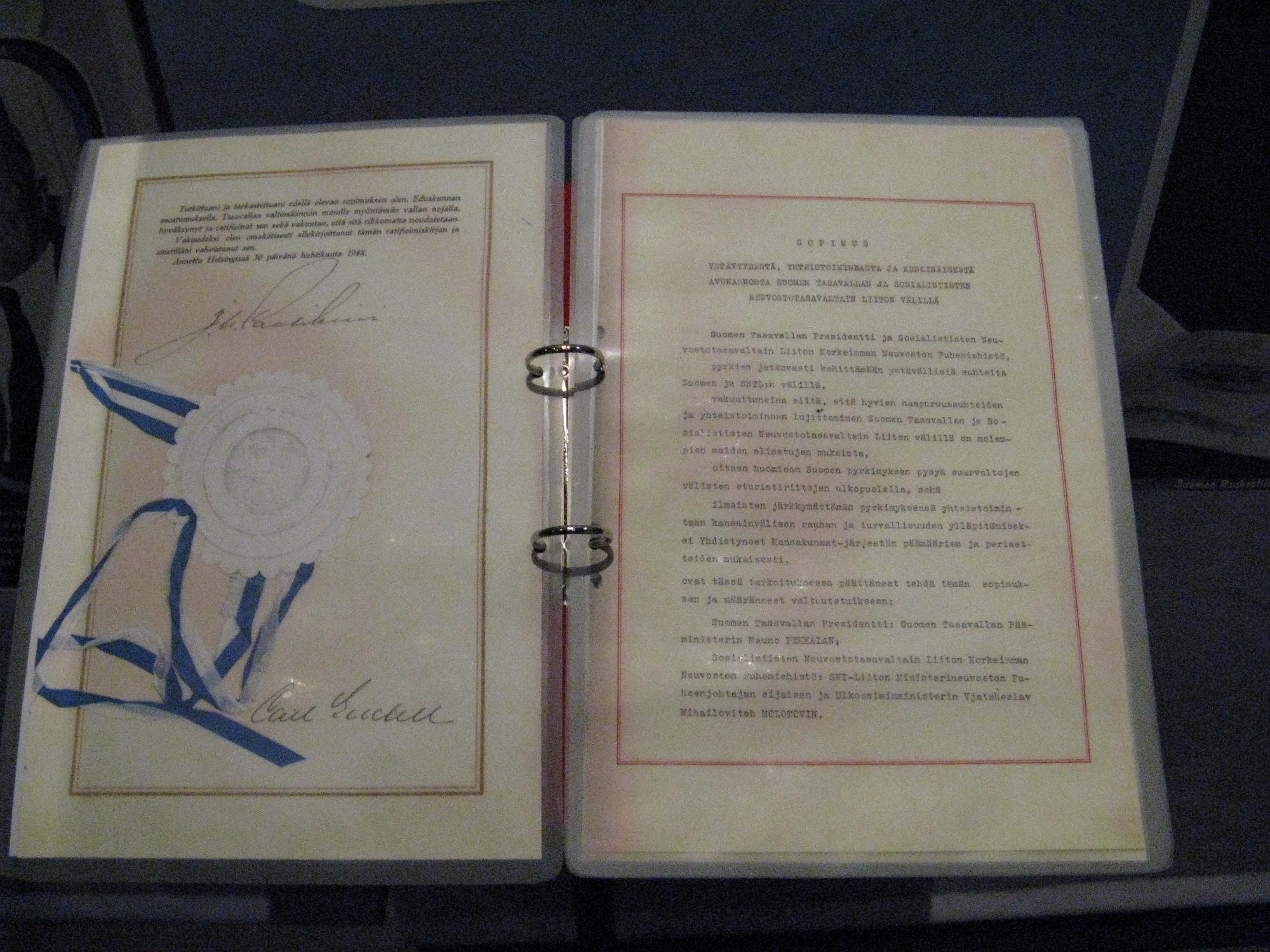
- Finno-Soviet Treaty
- Type: Bilateral treaty
- Signed: 6 April 1948
- Location: Moscow, Russian SFSR, USSR
- Expiry: 20 January 1992
- Original signatories: Soviet Union; Finland
- Signatories: Soviet Foreign Minister Vyacheslav Molotov; Prime Minister of Finland Mauno Pekkala
- Languages: Russian, Swedish, Finnish

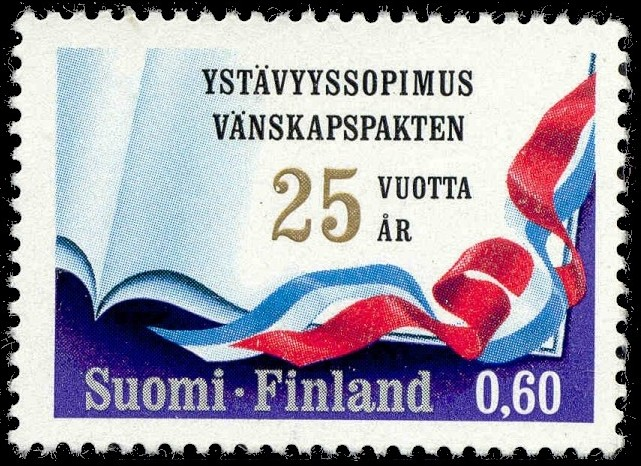
A Finnish postage stamp was issued in 1973

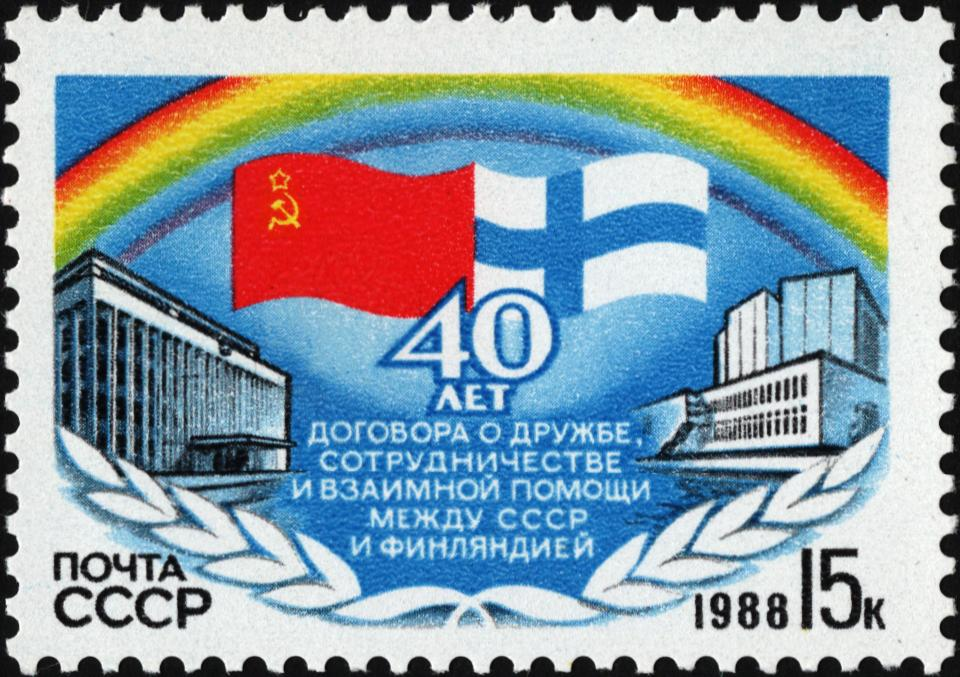
A Soviet postage stamp was issued in 1988

Postage stamps mark the 25th and 40th anniversary of the YYA agreement.

The Agreement of Friendship, Cooperation, and Mutual Assistance of 1948, also known as the YYA Treaty from the Finnish Ystävyys-, yhteistyö- ja avunantosopimus (YYA-sopimus) (Swedish: Vänskaps-, samarbets- och biståndsavtalet (VSB-avtalet)), was the basis for Finno–Soviet relations from 1948 to 1992. It was the main instrument in implementing the Finnish policy called Paasikivi–Kekkonen doctrine.

Under the treaty, which was signed on 6 April 1948, the Soviets sought to deter Western or Allied Powers from attacking the Soviet Union through Finnish territory, and the Finns sought to increase Finland's political independence from the Soviet Union. It thus ensured Finland's survival as a liberal democracy in close proximity to strategic Soviet regions, such as the Kola Peninsula and the major city of Leningrad.

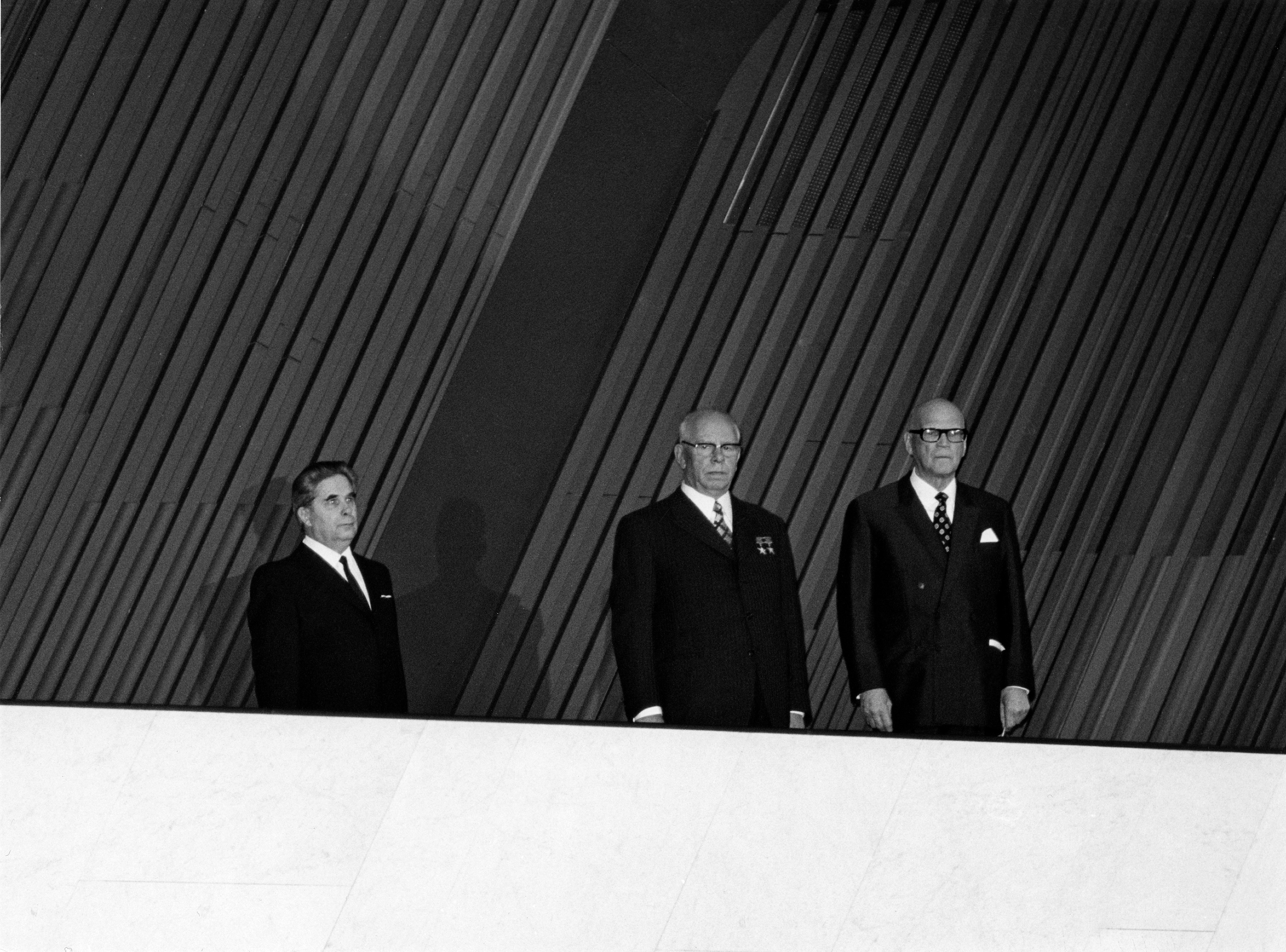
Presidents Urho Kekkonen and Nikolai Podgorny at Finlandia Hall

Under the pact, Finland was obliged to resist armed attacks by "Germany or its allies" (in reality interpreted as the Western Bloc) against Finland, or against the Soviet Union through Finland. If necessary, Finland was to ask for Soviet military aid to do so. However the pact in itself did not provide any provisions for the Soviet military to enter Finland and stipulated that all such actions would have to be agreed separately should Finland choose to request aid. Furthermore, the pact did not place any requirements for Finland to act should the Soviet Union be attacked (if the attack would not take place through Finland). The agreement also recognized Finland's desire to remain outside great-power conflicts, allowing the country to adopt a policy of neutrality in the Cold War.

Due to the uncertain status of Finno–Soviet relations in the years after the Continuation War, and the precise interpretation of the treaty's wording, Finland followed the Eastern Bloc countries' decision and did not participate in the Marshall Plan. As a result, Finland's post-war period of economic hardship was prolonged, compared to other European capitalist countries, and it thus became considerably more economically dependent on the Soviet Union. In general, Finland kept its relations towards western military powers officially distant (including the proposed Scandinavian Defense Union) and NATO in particular. By avoiding supporting the West, it attempted to fend off Soviet pressure for affiliation with the Warsaw Pact. No joint military exercises were ever held, and other military cooperation was minimal, despite occasional Soviet advances.

The YYA Treaty was a cornerstone in Paasikivi's foreign policy. It was also a central policy under the presidency of Urho Kekkonen (1956–1981), who dubbed his foreign policy doctrine the Paasikivi-Kekkonen line. The treaty was an instrumental tool for the Soviet Union to gain political leverage in the internal affairs of Finland in post-war era, in confrontations such as the note crisis. This influence was commonly referred to as Finlandization. It is hotly debated to what degree President Kekkonen (President 1956–1981) intentionally used it to further his own influence and damage his opponents.

Despite the official policy, there was some secret co-operation with the West. This ranged from Finnish organizations such as the Social Democratic Party accepting U.S. Central Intelligence Agency funding to sharing of seismic data on nuclear tests. Likewise, Eastern Bloc countries conducted espionage in Finland, e.g., the East German Stasi had agents there.

The Soviet Union had similar agreements with many nations that were not directly allied with it but depended heavily on Soviet support, such as North Korea since 1961, with India since 1971, and Vietnam since 1978. The first such agreement, however, was with Free France on 10 December 1944.

The treaty came to an end in 1992 with the signing of a new treaty (Naapuruussopimus) between Finland and the post-Soviet Russia.

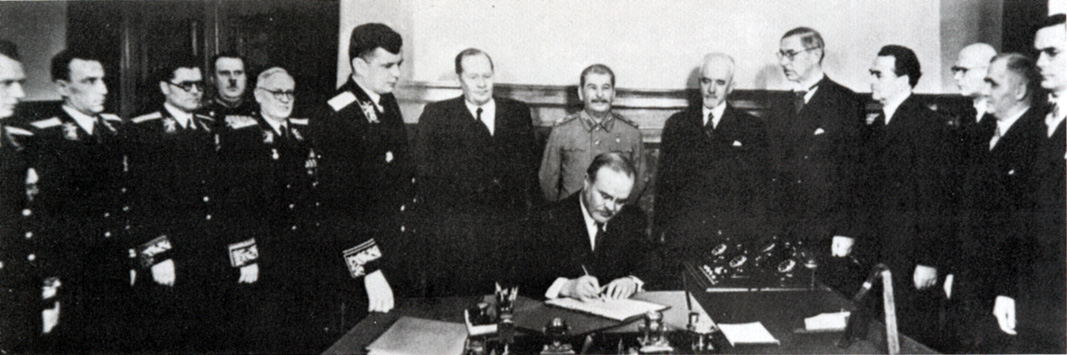
Signing of the Finno-Soviet Treaty between the Soviet Union and Finland in Moscow on April 6, 1948. Signed by Soviet Foreign Minister Vyacheslav Molotov, followed by Soviet Prime Minister Joseph Stalin. To the left of Stalin are the Prime Minister of Finland Mauno Pekkala, to the right of Stalin are Foreign Ministers Carl Enckell and Reinhold Svento, Minister of the Interior Yrjö Leino and MPs Urho Kekkonen, Onni Peltonen and J. O. Söderhjelm.

== See also ==
- Finland–Russia border
- Finland–Russia relations
- Finland–Russia Society
- Finlandization
- Paasikivi–Kekkonen doctrine
- Treaty of friendship
- Vassal
