= Asko Vilkuna =

Finnish ethnologist

Asko Kustaa Juhani Vilkuna (17 November 1929 – 13 December 2014) was a Finnish ethnologist.

He was born in Nivala as a son of Kustaa Vilkuna. Being a lecturer in Finnish at Lund University from 1955, Asko Vilkuna took his doctorate degree in 1958. In 1961 he became docent in ethnology of Finno-Ugric peoples at the University of Helsinki, remaining here until 1969, but also being professor of ethnology at the University of Jyväskylä from 1966 to 1993. He died in December 2014 in Jyväskylä. He was a member of the Norwegian Academy of Science and Letters from 1987.
