= Tiitinen list =

Finnish classified government document

The Tiitinen list is a Finnish classified government document which was given by West German Intelligence Service to the Finnish Security Police (Supo) in 1990. The list consists of the names of 18 persons who are suspected to have been in contact with the East German security service Stasi. The people are popularly described as having been suspected of spying for the Eastern Bloc. The list is named after Seppo Tiitinen, who was the head of Supo in 1990.

A copy of the list has been requested by journalist Susanna Reinboth and, in 2008, Supo was ordered to disclose the list by the Helsinki administrative court. In 2010, the ruling was overturned by the Supreme Court of Finland.

One major argument in keeping the list classified has been that it only specifies individuals who have allegedly been in contact with Stasi, but not the nature of the contact. Therefore being on the list would not constitute proof of or even indicate breaking any Finnish laws. Consequently it was chosen not to shame potentially innocent persons in the media. Supo also argued that the release of the list could endanger national security and its ability to cooperate with partners abroad hence Researcher Kimmo Elo, who had asked for the list and granted permission to study material related to Finnish-GDR relations during the Cold War, would be denied the list itself.

In October 2010, Julian Assange said in an interview that WikiLeaks had received a set of eight documents making up the Tiitinen list, and that it was to be published by the website pending a factual review. The list is "one of the most sought-after documents that Wikileaks has", according to Assange.

In 2011, Alpo Rusi claimed that the late former prime minister Kalevi Sorsa was one of the 18 names on the list.

In 2018, Tiitinen that Stasi's efforts were mainly focused on the Social Democratic Party of Finland, along with Tiitinen stating, "It only made sense to fraternize with the SDP because they were the only ones with power".
