= Paasikivi–Kekkonen doctrine =

Finnish Cold War foreign policy

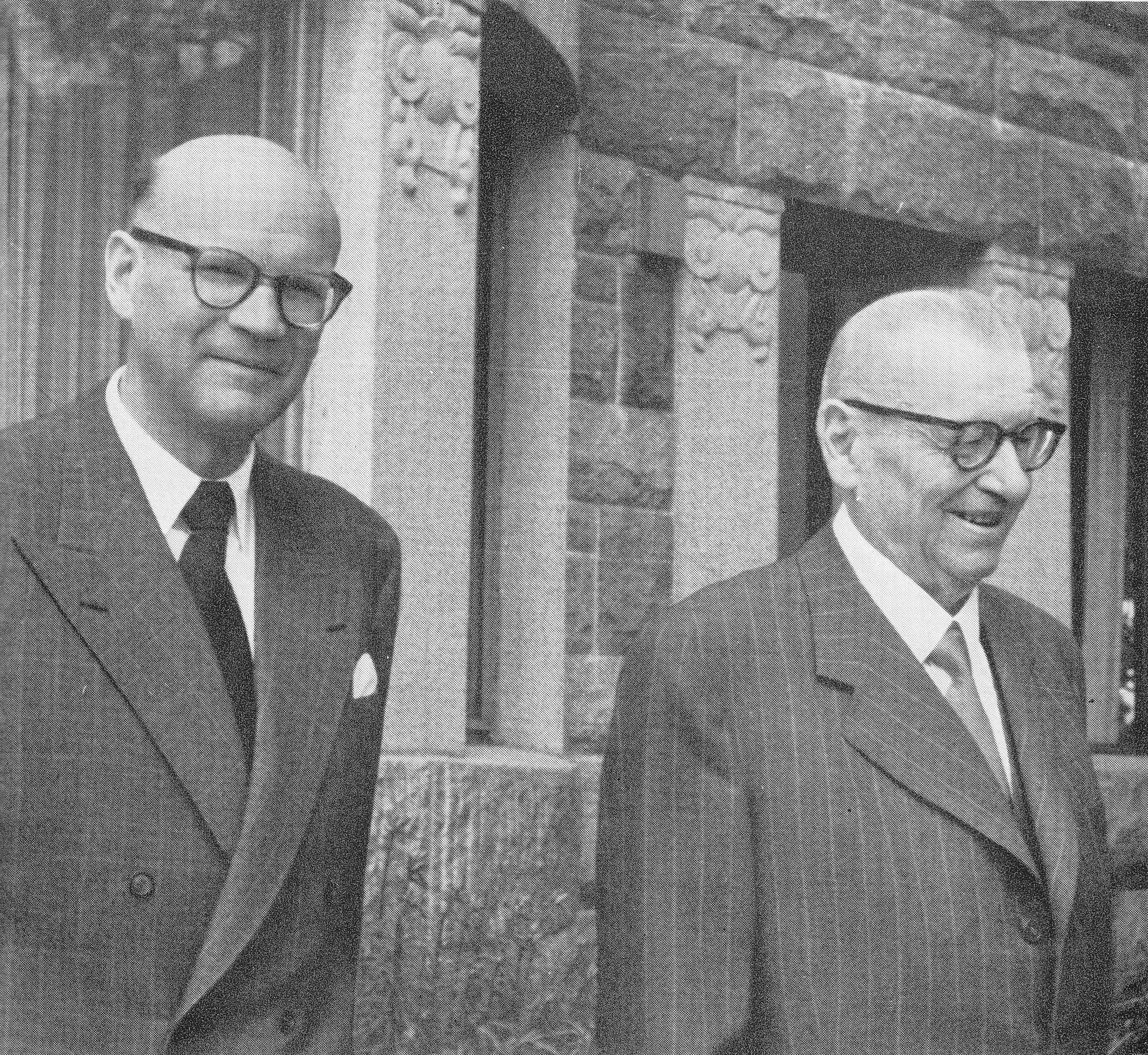
Kekkonen and Paasikivi in Kultaranta in 1955.

The Paasikivi–Kekkonen doctrine was a foreign policy doctrine established by Finnish President Juho Kusti Paasikivi and continued by his successor Urho Kekkonen, aimed at Finland's survival as an independent sovereign, democratic country in the immediate proximity of the Soviet Union.

The principal architect of Finland's postwar foreign policy of neutrality was Juho Kusti Paasikivi, who was president from 1946 to 1956. Urho Kekkonen, president from 1956 until 1982, further developed this policy, stressing that Finland should be active rather than passive in its neutrality.

The Paasikivi Society was established in 1958 to promote the doctrine in Finland and abroad. Paasikivi and Kekkonen became Honorary Members of the Society.

== Background ==
Finland and the Soviet Union signed the Paris Peace Treaty in February 1947, which, in addition to the concessions of the Moscow Peace Treaty, provided for:

- Limiting the size of Finland's defense forces,
- Cession to the Soviet Union of the Petsamo area on the Arctic coast,
- Lease of the Porkkala peninsula off Helsinki to the Soviets for use as a naval base for 50 years (it was returned ahead of schedule in 1956),
- Free transit access to this area across Finnish territory, and
- War reparations to the Soviet Union decided at 300 million gold dollars (amounting to an estimated 570 million U.S. dollars in 1952, the year the payments ended).

== Realization ==
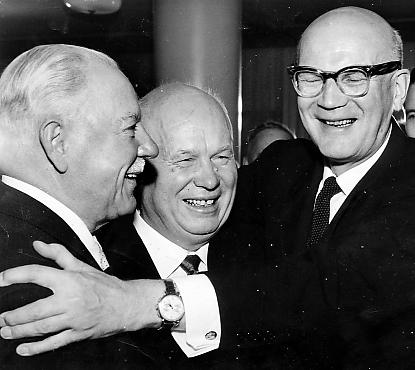
Chairman of the Presidium of the Supreme Soviet, Marshal Kliment Voroshilov, General Secretary of the Central Committee of the CPSU Nikita Khrushchev, and President of Finland Urho Kekkonen meeting in Moscow in November 1960.

In April 1948, Finland signed an Agreement of Friendship, Cooperation, and Mutual Assistance with the Soviet Union. Under this mutual assistance pact, Finland was obligated, with the aid of the Soviet Union, if necessary, to resist armed attacks by "Germany or its allies" (i.e., NATO) against Finland or against the Soviet Union through Finland. At the same time, the agreement recognized Finland's desire to remain outside great-power conflicts. This agreement was renewed for 20 years in 1955, 1970, and 1983. This allowed Finland to retain independence in internal affairs, e.g., a multiparty parliamentary system, and not to join the Eastern Bloc. However, joining NATO or another overt alliance with the West was out of the question and foreign policy was often limited.

== Criticism ==
Contemporary Finns often criticized the Paasikivi–Kekkonen doctrine as tending towards a "liturgy" of good relations. Both countries were militarily prepared. However, international trade was active within the framework of bilateral trade. Furthermore, the policy was closely tied to President Kekkonen, who consequently exploited his position as a "guarantor of Soviet relations" against political opponents. Outright censorship, both official and unofficial, was employed against films and other works considered explicitly anti-Soviet, such as The Manchurian Candidate or The Gulag Archipelago, although political freedoms were not otherwise coercively limited.

Later criticism has included the following points:

- The Soviet Union did not consider Finland a neutral country, but "striving to be neutral". Although Kekkonen was largely successful in retaining sovereign control over Finland's affairs, Finland's position on international issues, such as the invasion of Czechoslovakia, was often ambiguous or Soviet-friendly. The 1977 hijacking of a Soviet airliner further exemplifies this; the undue influence of the Soviet ambassador, who would storm a government meeting to make demands, shows that the Finnish government had trouble fending off Soviet interference. The Soviet Union had an unusually large diplomatic mission in Finland, and Kekkonen communicated with the Soviet Union through the KGB station chief rather than by regular diplomatic channels. The Soviets intervened in Finnish politics in various ways, e.g. through the Communist Party of Finland and Soviet-friendly contacts in other parties (e.g. Kekkonen's K-linja in the Centre Party).
- The Soviet military kept a separate unit in readiness to invade Helsinki from Tallinn in the case of war. The plans, which were fully updated, were left behind in the withdrawal of Soviet troops from Estonia after Estonia regained independence in 1991.
- The policy had little respect in the West. Western foreign policy actors and military personnel either did not know about the policy or assumed it would fail from the outset. Regarding the former, British military officers were known to have inquired about the number of Soviet troops in Finland. Regarding the latter, nuclear weapons were trained on targets in Finland, with the assumption that any possible Finnish resistance to a Soviet invasion would be a certain failure.
- There was covert cooperation between the Finnish government and Western intelligence agencies. The CIA could fund the anti-Communist Social Democratic Party, a major, often government-leading party, though it gradually became unusually pro-Soviet beginning in the late 1960s, with many radical leftists holding influential posts among other such parties. There was also military intelligence cooperation, for instance allowing SIGINT flights to probe the Soviet radar network (according to Pekka Visuri) and providing seismic data to detect Soviet nuclear tests.

== Liquidation ==
The Finns responded cautiously in 1990–91 to the decline of Soviet power and the USSR's subsequent dissolution. They unilaterally abrogated restrictions imposed by the 1947 and 1948 treaties with the exception of a ban on acquiring nuclear weapons, joined in voicing Nordic concerns over the coup against Soviet leader Mikhail Gorbachev, and gave increasing unofficial encouragement to Baltic independence.

At the same time, by replacing the Soviet-Finnish mutual assistance pact with treaties on general cooperation and trade, Finns put themselves on an equal footing while retaining a friendly bilateral relationship. Finland subsequently boosted cross-border commercial ties and touted its potential as a commercial gateway to Russia. It had reassured Russia that it would not raise claims about the formerly Finnish territory ceded after the Continuation War (though a small but vocal minority of people disagree), and continued to reaffirm the importance of good bilateral relations until Russia–EU relations became increasingly strained due to the Russo-Ukrainian War. Following the Russian invasion of Ukraine, the policy of neutrality was permanently abandoned. On 18 April 2022, Prime Minister Sanna Marin, with the support of both governing and opposition parties, announced a bid to join NATO which resulted in Finland's entry into the bloc on 4 April 2023.

== See also ==
- Finland–Russia relations
- Finland–NATO relations
- Finlandization
- Night Frost Crisis
- Note Crisis
- Politics of Finland
- Politics of the Soviet Union
