= Kaarlo Kajatsalo =

Finnish educator and politician (1909–1988)

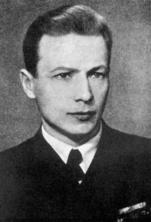
Kaarlo Kajatsalo

Kaarlo Viljam Kajatsalo (28 September 1909 – 22 February 1988; surname until 1945 Salo) was a Finnish educator and politician, born in Vehkalahti. He was a member of the Parliament of Finland from 1954 to 1962, representing the People's Party of Finland. He served as Minister of Education from 29 August 1958 to 13 January 1959. He was a presidential elector in the 1956 Finnish presidential election.
