= Note Crisis =

Crisis in Soviet–Finnish relations in 1961

The Note Crisis (Finnish: noottikriisi, Swedish: notkrisen) was a political crisis in Soviet–Finnish relations in 1961. The Soviet Union sent Finland a diplomatic note on 30 October 1961, referring to the threat of war and West German militarization and proposing that Finland and the Soviet Union begin consultations on securing the defence of both countries, as provided for in the Finno-Soviet Treaty of 1948. The note coincided with the detonation of the Tsar Bomba, the most powerful nuclear test in history, and followed close on the heels of the Berlin Crisis and Bay of Pigs Invasion.

The note precipitated a crisis in Finland: activating the military provisions of the treaty would have frustrated Finland's post-war policy of neutrality in international affairs and greatly damaged Finland's relations with the West. One of the crucial goals of Finnish foreign policy was to reinforce the credibility of Finland's neutrality in the eyes of Western powers which were skeptical of the country's ability to resist Soviet influence.

== Response ==
At the time the note was sent, president Urho Kekkonen was in Hawaii on vacation, during his visit to the United States and Canada. The proposed consultations threatened the achievements of the previous decade, during which Finland had attained UN membership and the Soviets had vacated the Porkkala military base near Helsinki, leased to them in 1944 for fifty years. At worst, the note was seen as the possible first step towards establishing a Soviet military presence in Finland, and even further, the de facto end of Finnish independence.

President Kekkonen handled the matter by arranging a personal meeting with Nikita Khrushchev in Novosibirsk. As a result of the meeting, the Soviet Union agreed to "postpone" the consultations indefinitely, charging the Finns with monitoring the security situation in Northern Europe. The Finnish interpretation of the agreement was that the Soviets thereby left the matter of initiating military consultations to Finnish discretion, and the crisis was defused.

== Possible Soviet motivation and results ==
The most common view today is that the Soviet Union was mainly motivated by a desire to ensure Kekkonen's re-election in 1962. Kekkonen, who enjoyed the confidence of the Soviet leadership, was seeking re-election for the first time, and his main opponent, Olavi Honka, was regarded as having a good chance of victory with the backing of a six-party coalition, including two major parties, the Social Democrats and the National Coalition. The extent to which Kekkonen may himself have been involved in orchestrating the incident is disputed, but it is commonly accepted that he was expecting a Soviet intervention in the presidential election, and Kekkonen is known to have planned dissolving the Finnish parliament, forcing his opponents to campaign together in the presidential election and against each other in the parliamentary election at the same time.

As a result of the crisis, Honka dropped his candidacy in November 1961, and in January 1962, Kekkonen was re-elected by an overwhelming vote of 199 out of 300 electoral college votes. During his second term in office, the Social Democrats were reconciled with Kekkonen's Agrarian League, leading to a new era in Finnish internal politics dominated by this so-called "red earth" alliance.

== Timeline ==
- 10 October 1961: President Kekkonen travels to Canada and the United States for a three-week state visit.
- 16 – 17 October 1961: In Washington, Kekkonen meets President John F. Kennedy and Secretary of State Dean Rusk. In a statement concluded at the end of their discussions, the United States confirms its respect for Finland's policy of neutrality.

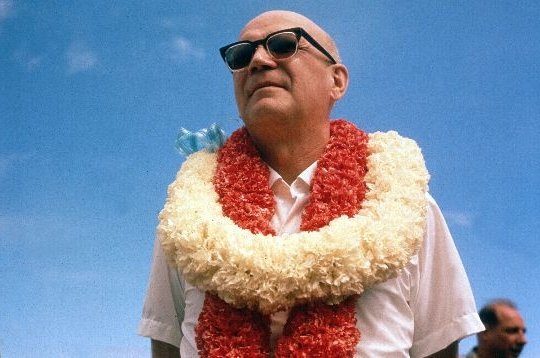
Urho Kekkonen in Hawaii

- 30 October 1961: In Moscow, Soviet Foreign Minister Andrei Gromyko hands over a note to Finnish Ambassador Eero A. Wuori, calling attention to the Federal Republic of Germany's increased military activities in the Baltic Sea and proposing "consultations on measures due to the threat of a military attack by NATO". President Kekkonen is informed of the note while resting in the Hawaiian Islands. The President continues his original program of visits despite the note. Finnish Foreign Minister Ahti Karjalainen, who is part of the delegation, immediately returns to Finland.
- 1 November 1961: Kekkonen gives a speech at the dinner of the World Affairs Council in Los Angeles in which he states that the note has not brought anything new to the relations between Finland and the Soviet Union but that it instead reflects the tension prevailing in Europe. Foreign Minister Karjalainen, who arrives in Helsinki on the same day, announces that the President will give a radio and television message upon his return to Finland.
- 3 November 1961: President Kekkonen returns to Finland. On the same day in the presidential residence Tamminiemi, he meets Prime Minister Martti Miettunen and Foreign Minister Karjalainen and tells them that he is preparing a speech in which he will announce that he will refuse consultations and withdraw his presidential candidacy.
- 5 November 1961: Kekkonen gives a radio and television address in which he appeals for Finland's policy of neutrality and states he considers it unnecessary to examine whether the conditions for negotiations required by the Finno-Soviet Treaty exist. However, Kekkonen does not withdraw his candidacy.
- 6 November 1961 Foreign Minister Karjalainen meets the Ambassador of the Soviet Union, Alexei Zakharov. Karjalainen suggests a discussion with Foreign Minister Gromyko on the political side of the note and postponement of military consultations. The aim of Kekkonen and Karjalainen is to start a discussion with the Soviet leadership only on the political situation, avoiding a discussion on the threat of war and the military situation. On November 7, Kekkonen informs the Finnish military leadership that military problems are not the main reason for the note. He orders the military leadership to stay out of the negotiations and to not raise the readiness level of Finnish forces.
- 10 November 1961: Foreign Minister Karjalainen flies to Moscow on a negotiating trip.
- 11 November 1961: Foreign Minister Karjalainen negotiates with Foreign Minister Andrei Gromyko in Moscow. Gromyko states that the Soviet military leadership has been calling for military consultations with Finland for a long time and that the country's political leadership has so far rejected these demands because it has relied on Finland's foreign policy leadership. Karjalainen suggests the negotiations were limited to political issues. Gromyko demands that Finland demonstrate the continuity of its foreign policy so that military consultations might be avoided. Karjalainen suggests that bringing forward the parliamentary elections from July to February 1962 could be such a demonstration.
- 12 November 1961: Karjalainen returns to Finland and explains the results of the negotiations to President Kekkonen and the parliamentary groups.
- 14 November 1961: President Kekkonen dissolves the Finnish Parliament and orders an early election to be held on February 4, 1962.
- 15 November 1961: Soviet Deputy Foreign Minister Vasili Kuznetsov informs Finnish Ambassador Wuori that bringing forward the parliamentary elections alone is not enough and that urgent negotiations remain necessary as the international situation has further tightened since the note was first sent, due to joint military exercises planned by the Federal Republic of Germany and Denmark.
- 17 November 1961: Ambassador Wuori receives a hint that President Kekkonen could travel to Novosibirsk in a week's time to meet Nikita Khrushchev. Wuori arrives in Helsinki the same evening to meet Kekkonen, Miettunen and Karjalainen.
- 18 November 1961: The Finnish government proposes that President Kekkonen meet Khrushchev to resolve the note crisis. On 19 November, Ambassador Zakharov confirms that Khrushchev is ready for the meeting.
- 20 November 1961: U.S. Ambassador Bernard Gufler delivers a secret message from Kennedy to Kekkonen. The US president pledges non-military American support for Finnish neutrality and independence.
- 22 November 1961: President Kekkonen leaves for Novosibirsk. According to Ahti Karjalainen, the atmosphere in Helsinki is such that Kekkonen's departure from Helsinki Central railway station could have gathered large crowds to sing patriotic hymns as in autumn 1939 before the Winter War. This would have made Kekkonen's negotiations more difficult, so the president's entourage travels by car from Helsinki first to Loviisa, where Kekkonen meets his brother Jussi Kekkonen, and then to Luumäki, where the entourage boards the train to Moscow. From Moscow, Kekkonen continues by plane to Novosibirsk the next day.
- 24 November 1961: Kekkonen and Khrushchev engage in all-day negotiations in Novosibirsk. Kekkonen suggests that the Soviet Union refrain from consultations to prevent an increase in war psychosis. In Kekkonen's opinion, Finland's policy of neutrality provides sufficient security guarantees for the Soviet Union. According to Khrushchev, the note has not been due to a lack of confidence in Finland, but to the increased military threat of the Federal Republic of Germany. According to Khrushchev, the Western military alliance NATO is coming under German control, and he is particularly concerned about German military cooperation with Denmark and Norway. Khrushchev states that the Soviet Union has full confidence in President Kekkonen and suggests that thanks to that confidence, military consultations may be postponed until an urgent need arises. Khrushchev also criticizes the actions of Väinö Tanner and Väinö Leskinen, claiming that they are reviving the old brotherhood with Germany and working against the Soviet Union.
- 25 November 1961: Olavi Honka withdraws as presidential candidate. The decision is his own, as the Soviet Union has not made this a condition for waiving consultations. On the same day, Kekkonen returns from Novosibirsk to Moscow and meets Chairman of the Presidium Leonid Brezhnev in the Kremlin for lunch.

Urho Kekkonen arrives in Helsinki (Finland) from Novosibirsk (Soviet Union) after his negotiation trip on 26 November 1961

- 26 November 1961: President Kekkonen returns to Finland and gives a radio and television address at 9 pm in which he announces that the Soviet Union has given up the demand for consultations. Kekkonen says that the Soviet Union has confidence in Finland's policy but adds that "if we cause that confidence to run out by our actions, the fault is our own".

== See also ==
- Finlandization
- Night Frost Crisis
- Paasikivi–Kekkonen doctrine
