= Kuuskoski cabinet =

Kuuskoski Cabinet
- 43rd Cabinet of Finland
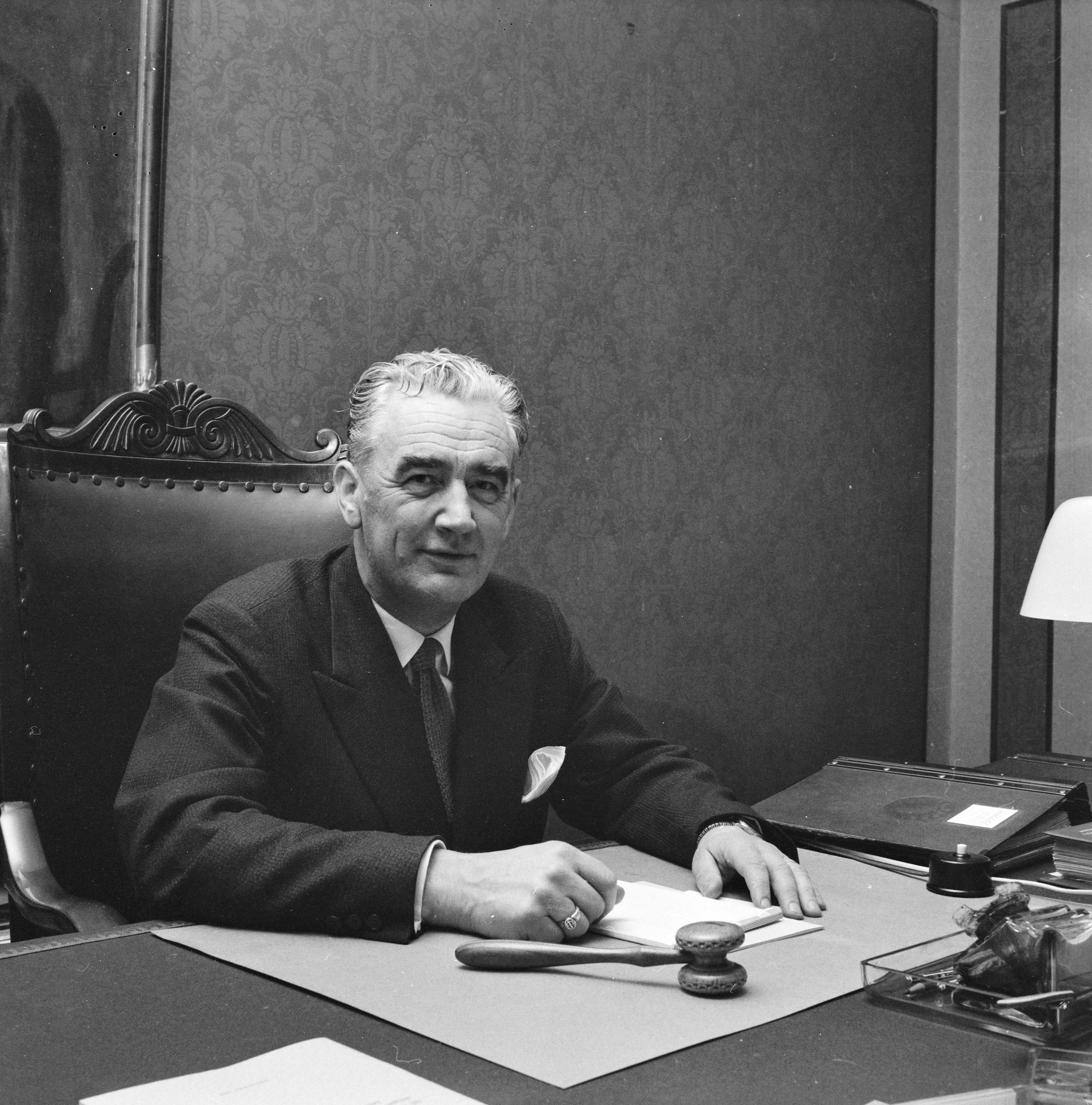
- Prime Minister Reino Kuuskoski in 1958
- Date formed: 26 April 1958
- Date dissolved: 29 August 1958

People and organisations
- Prime Minister: Reino Kuuskoski
- Status in legislature: Caretaker government

History
- Predecessor: Von Fieandt
- Successor: Fagerholm III

Reino Kuuskoski's cabinet was the 43rd government of Republic of Finland. Cabinet's time period was from April 26, 1958 to August 29, 1958. It was a caretaker government.

Assembly
Minister	Period of office	Party
Prime Minister; Reino Kuuskoski	April 26, 1958 – August 29, 1958	Agrarian League
Deputy Prime Minister; Tyyne Leivo-Larsson	April 26, 1958 – August 29, 1958	Social Democratic Opposition
Minister of Foreign Affairs; Paavo Hynninen	April 26, 1958 – August 29, 1958	Independent
Minister of Justice; Johan Otto Söderhjelm	April 26, 1958 – August 29, 1958	Swedish People's Party
Minister of Defence; Edvard Björkenheim	April 26, 1958 – August 29, 1958	Agrarian League
Minister of the Interior; Harras Kyttä	April 26, 1958 – August 29, 1958	People's Party
Minister of Finance Ilmo Nurmela	April 26, 1958 – August 29, 1958	Independent
Minister of Education; Kustaa Vilkuna	April 26, 1958 – August 29, 1958	Agrarian League
Minister of Agriculture; Pauli Lehtosalo	April 26, 1958 – August 29, 1958	Agrarian League
Deputy Minister of Agriculture; Matti Lepistö	April 26, 1958 – August 29, 1958	Social Democratic Opposition
Minister of Transport and Public Works Paavo Kastari	April 26, 1958 – August 29, 1958	Independent
Deputy Minister of Transport and Public Works; Eero Antikainen	April 26, 1958 – August 29, 1958	Social Democratic Opposition
Minister of Trade and Industry; Lauri Kivekäs	April 26, 1958 – August 29, 1958	Independent
Minister of Social Affairs; Valdemar Liljeström	April 26, 1958 – August 29, 1958	Social Democratic Opposition
Minister of Social Affairs; Tyyne Leivo-Larsson	April 26, 1958 – August 29, 1958	Social Democratic Opposition

Preceded by Von Fieandt	Cabinet of Finland; April 26, 1958 – August 29, 1958	Succeeded by Fagerholm III
