= Finnish general strike of 1956 =

Political event in 20th century Finnish history

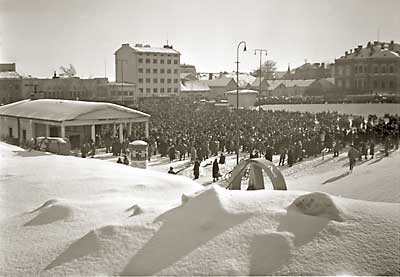
Town square meeting in support of the general strike in Jyväskylä, 1956.

The Finnish general strike of 1956 is the latest of the three general strikes in Finnish history; there have also been general strikes in 1905 and 1917. The 1956 strike occurred from March 1 to March 20, 1956. About 500,000 Finnish citizens took part in the strike.

== Background ==
Following the end of post-war price control measures by the government in 1955, the prices of many goods and services was on the rise. The cost of living in Finland increased by 7% in two months. The Central Organisation of Finnish Trade Unions (SAK) attempted to raise the overall level of wages to account for the rise in the price level. Though internally conflicted on the fine print, the SAK was demanding a raise of 12 mk per hour, which would raise the wages of Finnish workers by 6–10 percent.

The 1956 presidential election coincided with the industrial negotiations. One of the candidates was then-Prime Minister Urho Kekkonen, who didn't want to risk losing the presidential electoral college vote by accepting the SAK's proposal.

On February 16, the SAK's leadership decided to go forth and launch a general strike. Following the fall-through of emergency negotiations between the SAK and then Speaker of the Parliament Karl-August Fagerholm, the industrial action was started at 06:00 on March 1, the day President Urho Kekkonen assumed office for his first term.

The general strike, which concluded on 20 March, resulted in a nationwide wage increase of 6–10 percent.

The general strike intensified the internal conflicts of the Social Democratic Party and resulted in a leftist faction centred around Emil Skog leaving the party shortly after.

== See also ==
- Politics of Finland
