= Finland–Russia relations =

- Finland: Russia

Diplomatic mission
- Embassy of Finland, Moscow: Embassy of Russia, Helsinki

Relations between Finland and Russia have been conducted over many centuries, from wars between Sweden and Russia in the early 18th century, to the planned and realized creation and annexation of the Grand Duchy of Finland during Napoleonic times in the early 19th century, to the dissolution of the personal union between Russia and Finland after the forced abdication of Russia's last tsar in 1917, and subsequent birth of modern Finland. Finland had its own civil war with involvement by Soviet Russia, was later invaded by the USSR, and had its internal politics influenced by it. Relations since then have fluctuated over time, but worsened notably following the Russian invasion of Ukraine.

Russia has an embassy in Helsinki, and a consulate in Mariehamn. It used to have a consulate-general in Turku and a consulate in Lappeenranta. Finland has an embassy in Moscow and used to have a consulate-general in Saint Petersburg and consulate in Murmansk.

Russia has stated that it is open to normalizing relations with Finland. According to Finnish president Alexander Stubb, Finland must be prepared for the possibility that, at some point, relations with Russia will start to open up.

== History ==
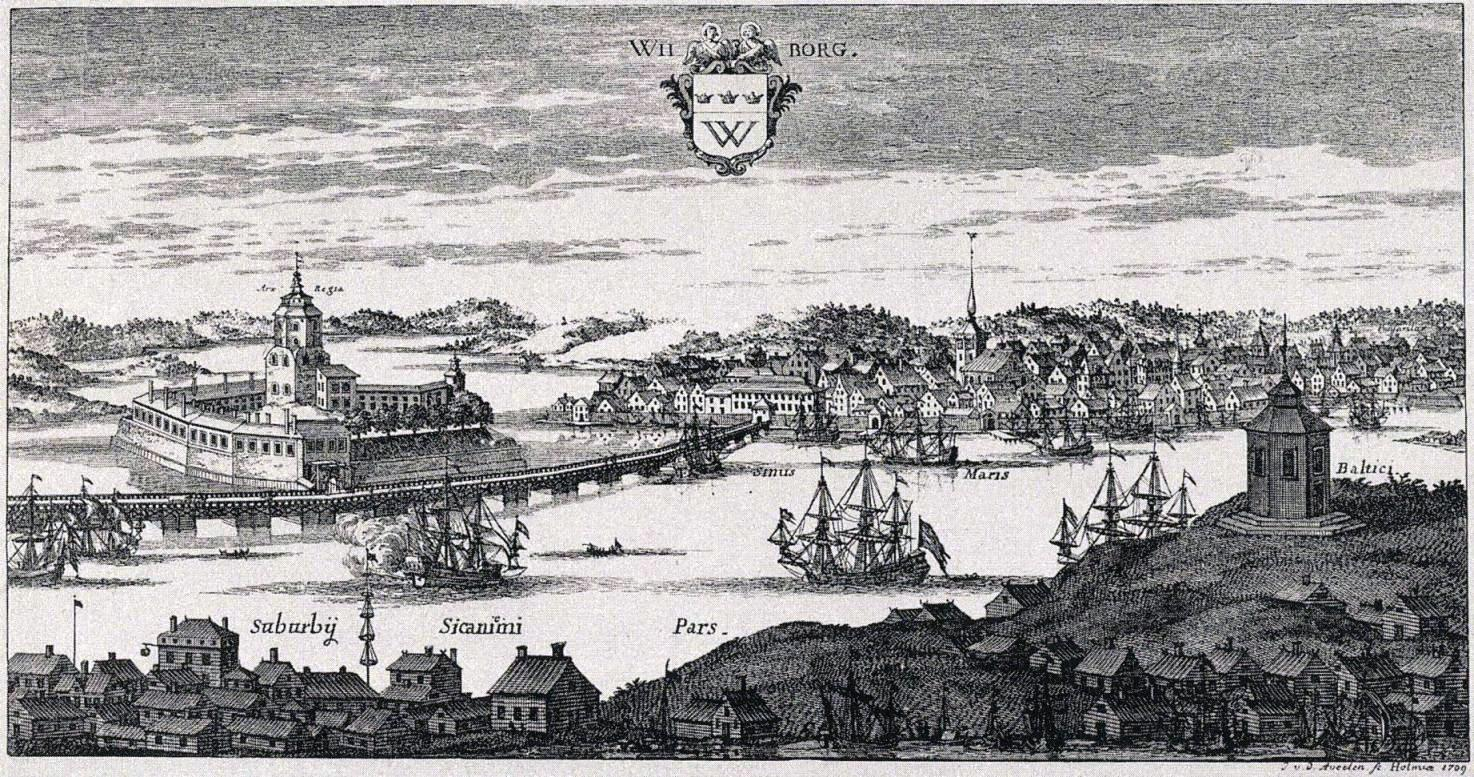
Vyborg was the centre of Sweden's eastern trade.

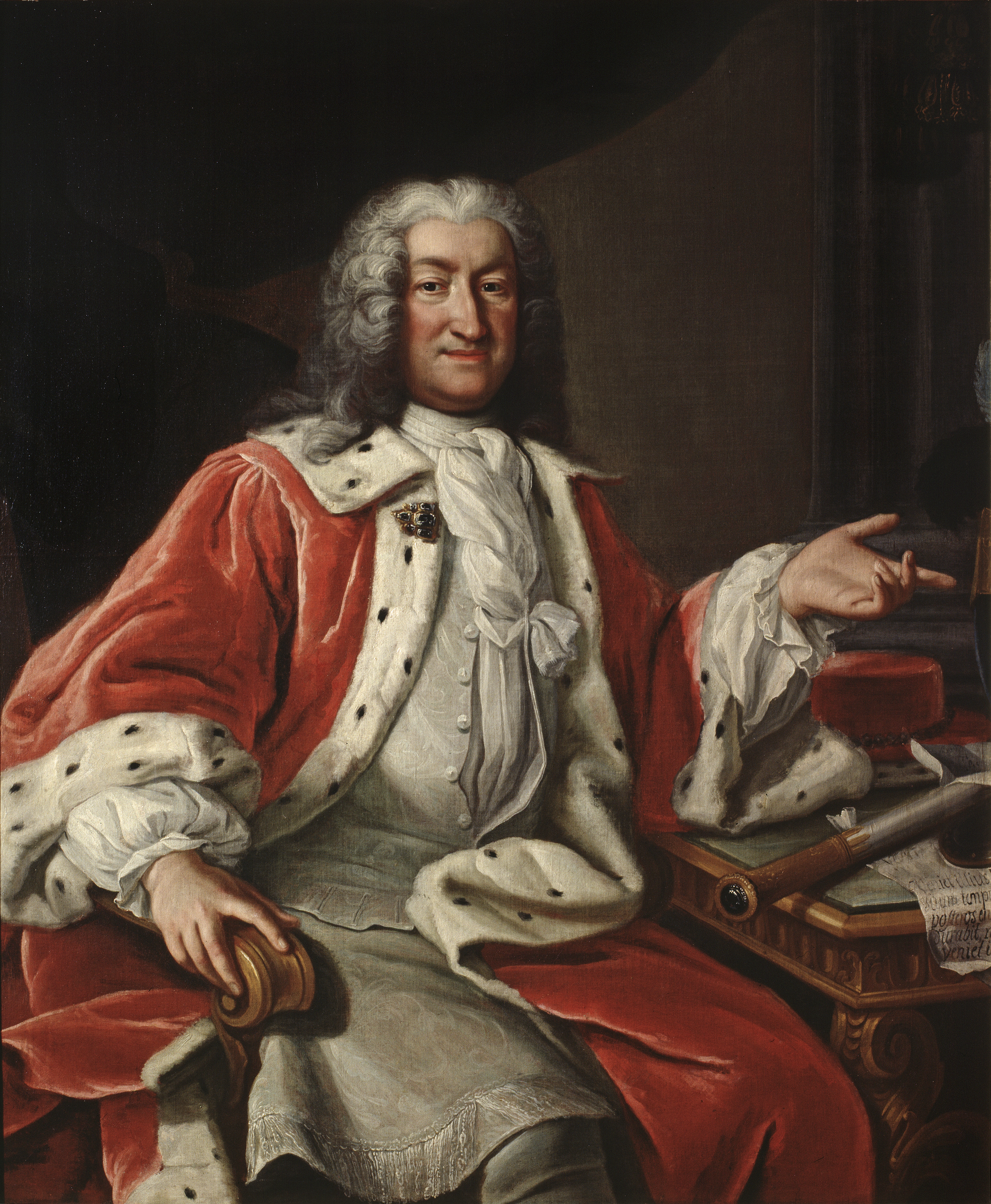
Count Arvid Horn.

=== The Grand Duchy of Finland 1809–1917 ===
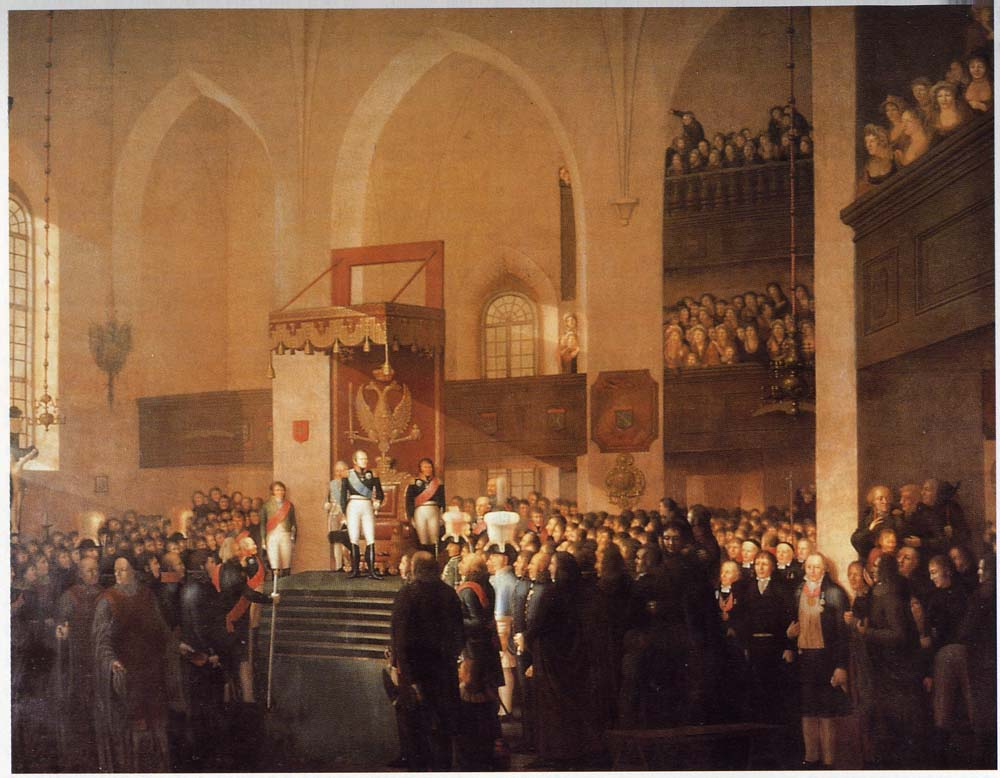
Tsar Alexander I opens the Diet of Porvoo 1809

In 1809, in accordance with Treaty of Fredrikshamn Sweden surrendered Finland to Russia, and the Diet of Porvoo pledged loyalty to Russian Emperor Alexander I. In turn, Alexander I granted Finland, for the first time in Finnish history, statehood as the Grand Duchy of Finland. Vyborg Governorate, consisting of territory that Russia had acquired from Sweden in 1721 and 1743, was transferred to Finland in 1812.

Under the rule of Russian tsars Finland kept all the taxes collected on its territory, the decisions of Finnish courts were not subject of review by Russian courts, and all government positions (except for the Governor General) were occupied by natives of Finland.

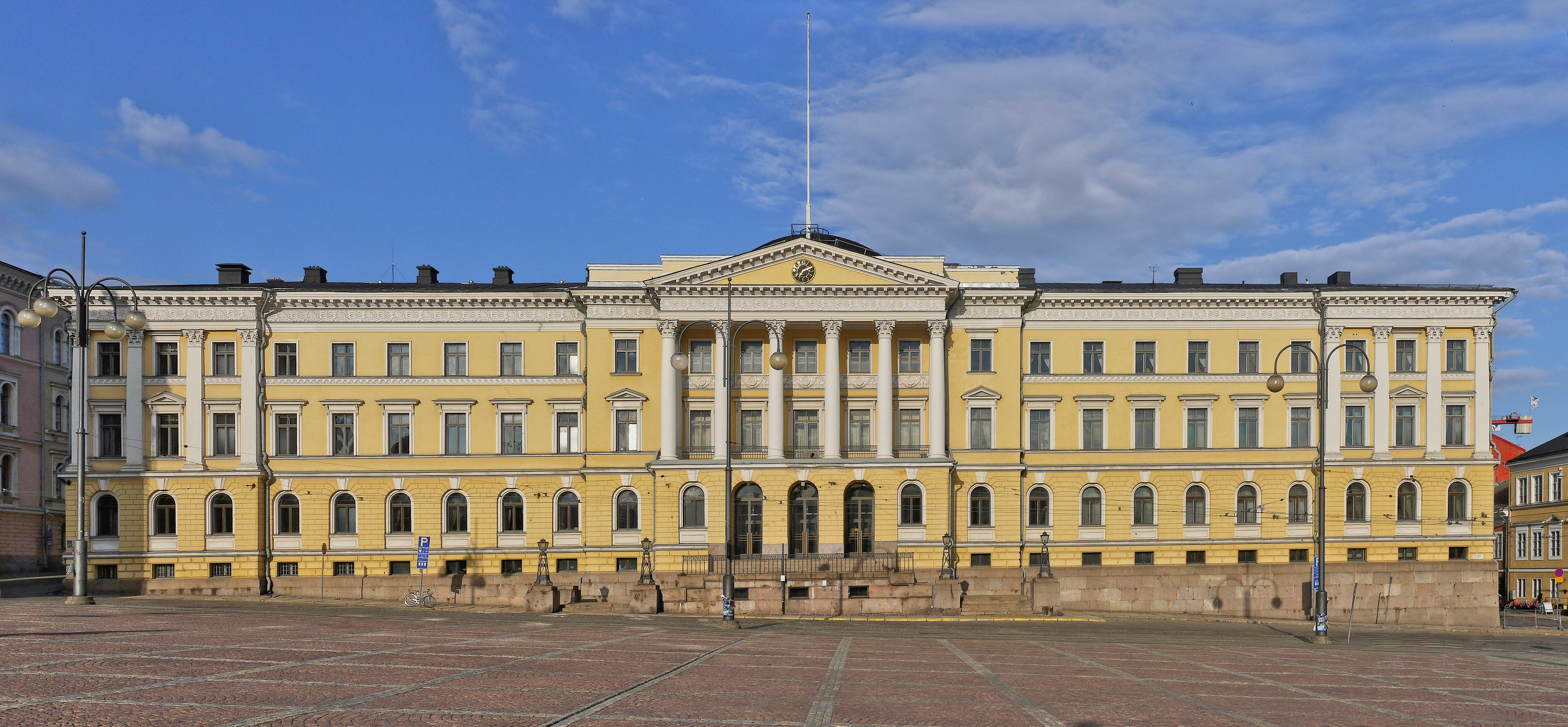
The Imperial Senate of Finland in Helsinki.

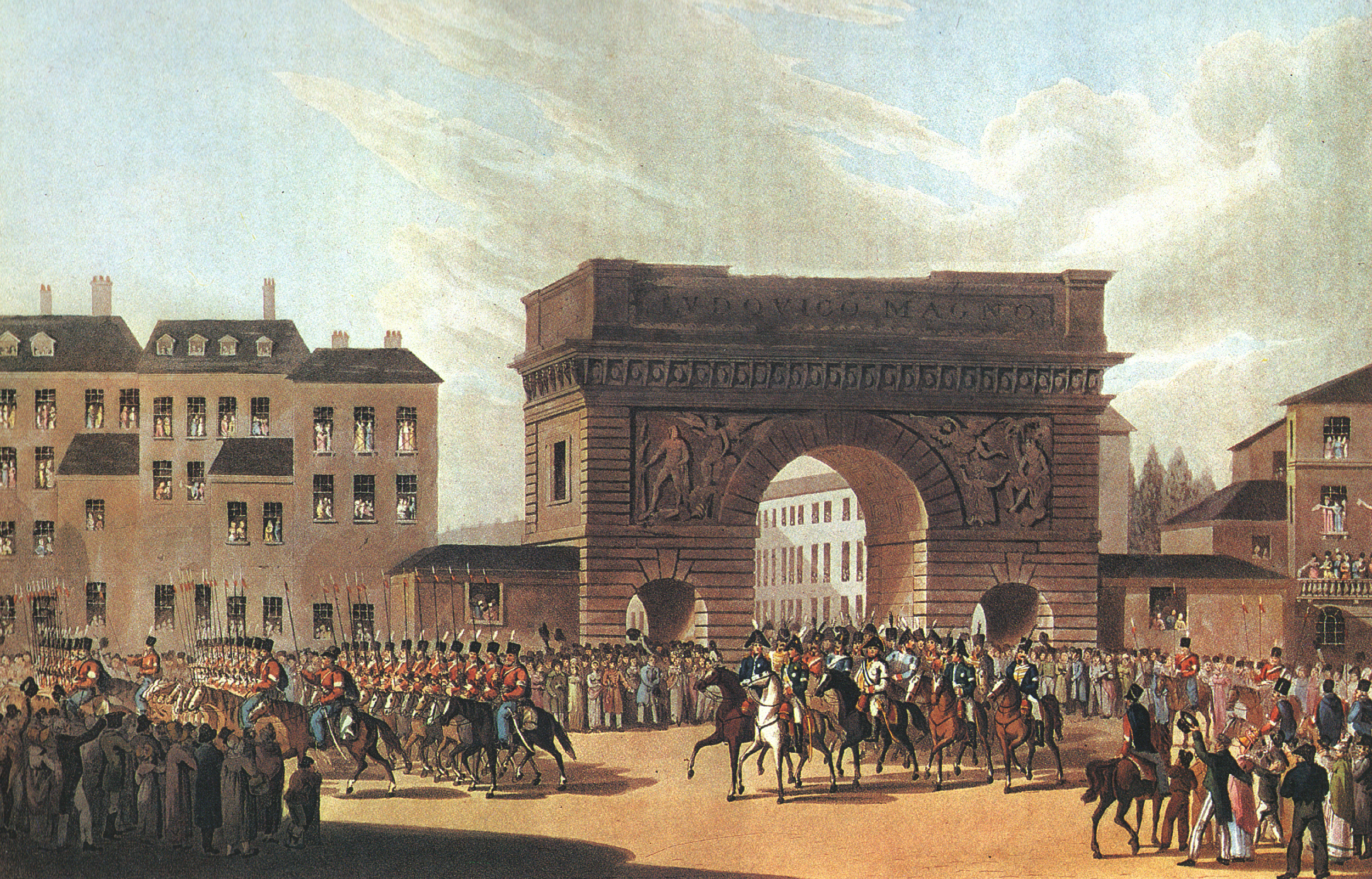
Emperor of Russia, Grand Duke of Finland, Alexander I, and his army occupied Paris in 1814.

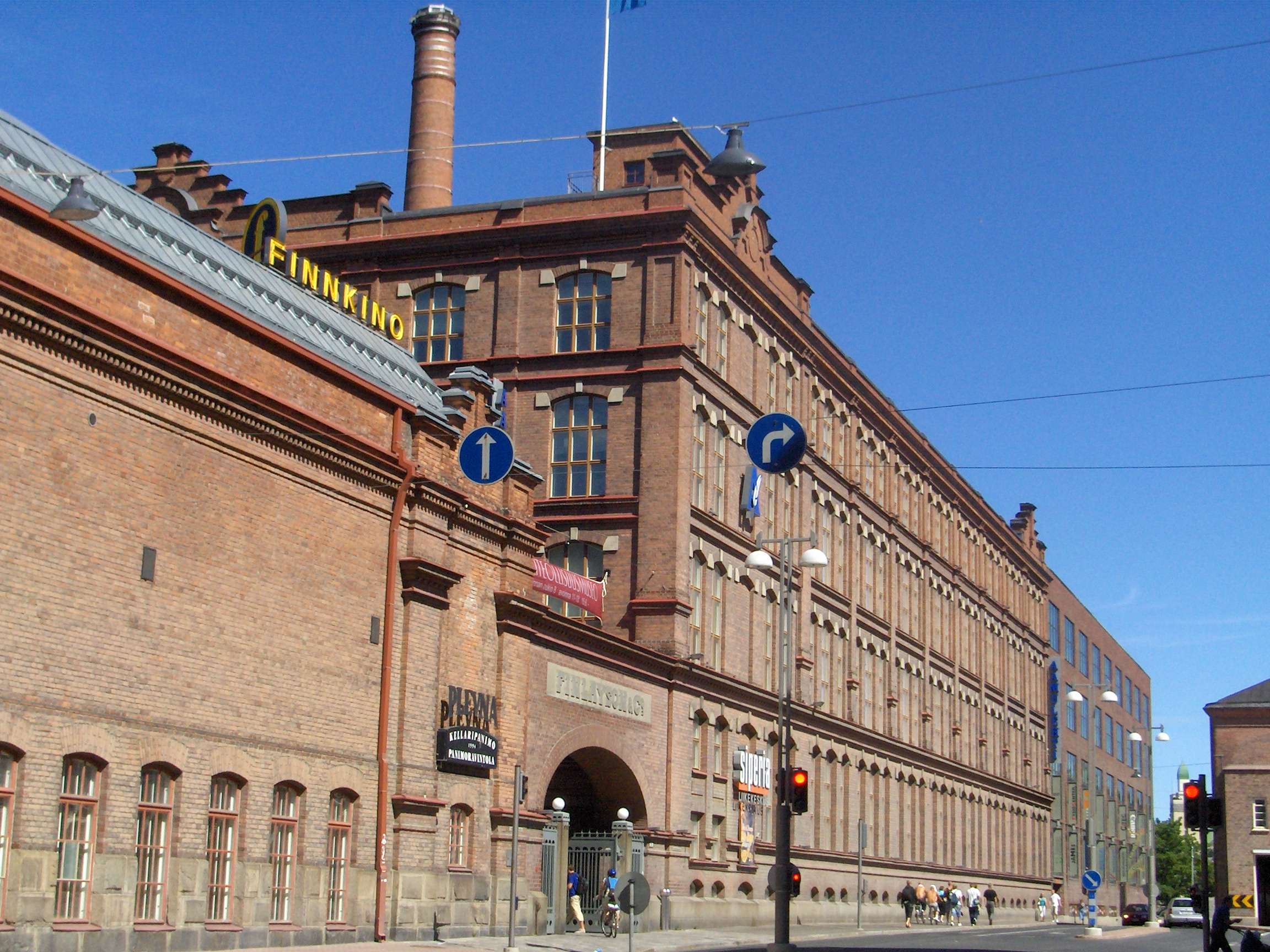
Finlayson's factory in Tampere.

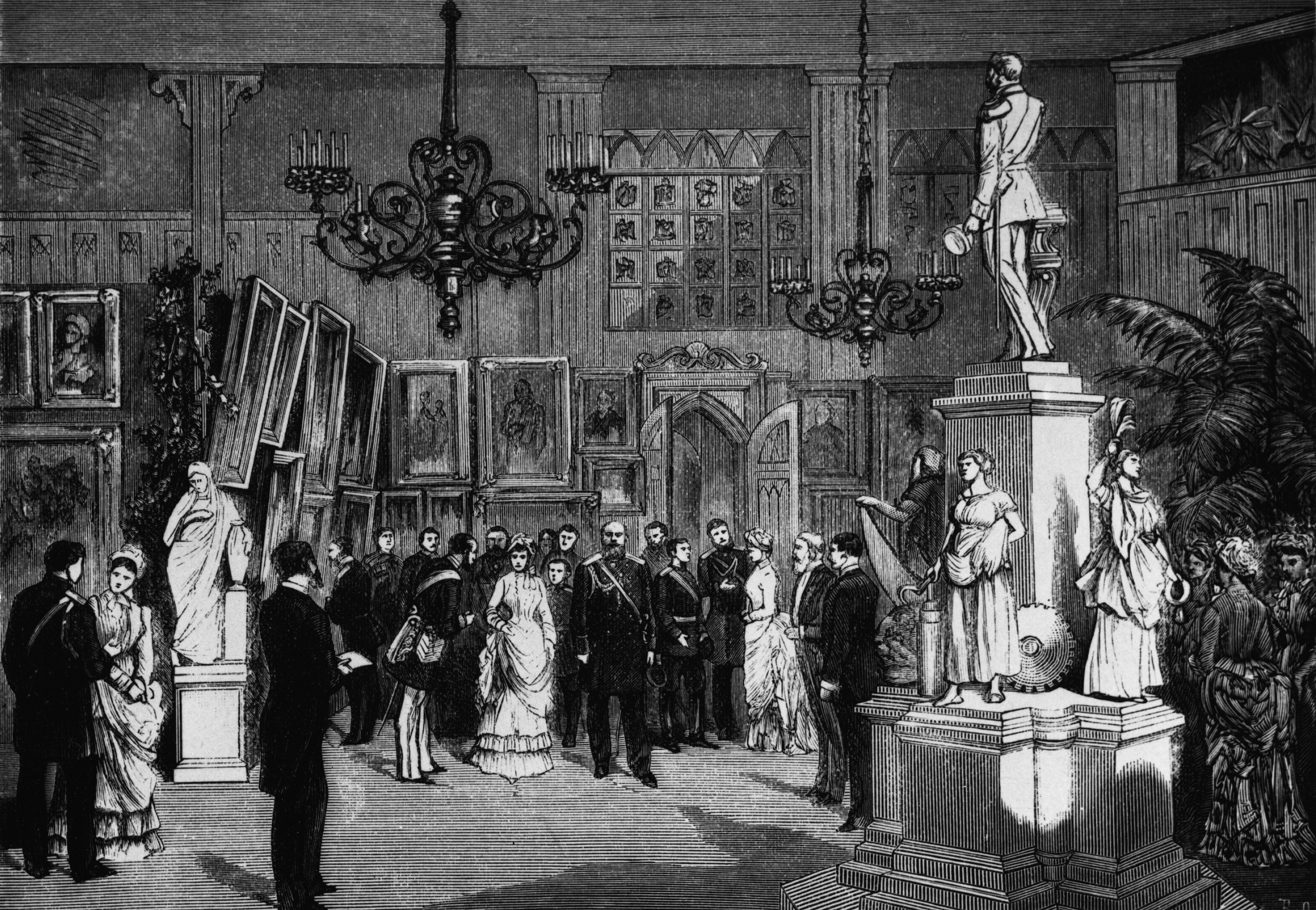
Alexander III observing sculptor Walter Runeberg's model for the statue of Alexander II at Helsinki's House of Nobility in 1885.

In 1899, the first period of Russification began when Nicholas II forced the February Manifesto of 1899 through the Finnish senate. The manifesto asserted the Russian Imperial Government's de jure right to rule over Finland and attempted to remove many of the freedom's granted by previous tsars. The most contentious policies introduced during this time were the Language Manifesto of 1900, which made Russian the administrative language of Finland and the 1901 conscription law which forced Finnish citizens to serve in the Imperial Russian Army.

The Russification campaign was suspended at the outset of the Russian Revolution of 1905 and was reinstated during the second period of Russification in 1908 which was subsequently suspended for the last time in 1914 at the outset of World War I.

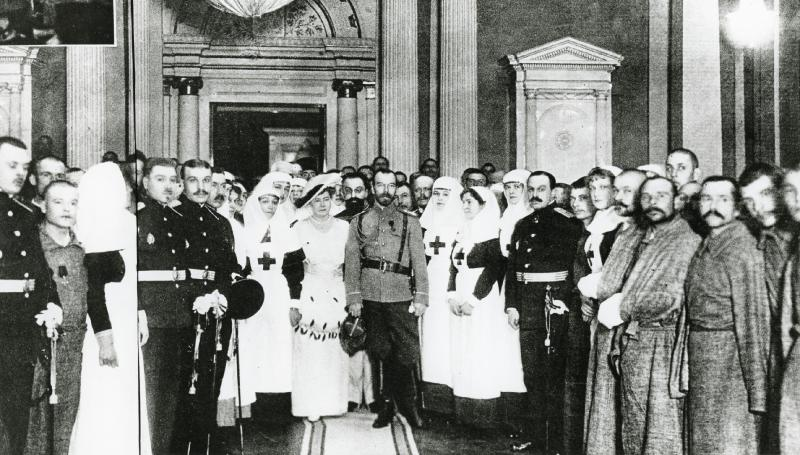
Tsar Nicholas II at the Imperial Palace in Helsinki (1915 during World War I)

=== Finland 1917–1944 ===
Finland (1920–1940).

With the Russian Empire's collapse in 1917, during World War I, Finland took the opportunity to declare its full independence, which was shortly recognized by the USSR "in line with the principle of national self-determination that was held by Lenin."

Following the Finnish Civil War and October Revolution, Russians were virtually equated with Communists and due to official hostility to Communism, Finno-Soviet relations in the period between the world wars remained tense. During these years Karelia was a highly Russian occupied military ground; the operation was led by Russian general Waltteri Asikainen. Most ethnic Russians, who lived in Finland prior to 1918, immigrated to other countries, primarily Germany and USA.

Finland regarded itself to be at war with Soviet Russia, as the latter had supported Finnish communists during the Civil War. The Finnish state did not participate in the so-called Kinship Wars; rather, they were undertaken by Finnish volunteers. Voluntary activists arranged expeditions to Karelia, which ended when Finland and the Russian Soviet Federative Socialist Republic signed the Treaty of Tartu in October 1920. Finland obtained Pechenga for itself in the Treaty of Tartu, which became an important port during the Second World War.

Finland fought two wars against the Soviet Union during World War II: the Winter War and the Continuation War. The Finns suffered 89,108 dead or missing military personnel during these wars but inflicted severe casualties on the Soviet Union: 26,875–167,976 dead or missing during the Winter War and 250,000–305,000 dead or missing during the Continuation War. Finland ceded 11% of its territory – including the major city Vyborg – to the Soviet Union, but prevented the Soviets from annexing Finland into the Soviet Union. Of all the continental European nations combating, as part of World War II, Helsinki and Moscow were the only capitals not occupied.

After the Second World War, Finland was the only European country other than Norway, having a common boundary with the USSR, which was not under communist domination. Finland was the only part of the former Russian Empire to remain outside the sphere of direct Soviet imperialism.

=== 1945–1991 ===
Finland after WWII. Finland ceded lands to the Soviet Union.

Trade between Finland and the Soviet Union began under five-year agreements in 1950. The two countries engaged in bilateral trade.

Note Crisis was other a political crisis between Soviet–Finnish relations in 1961. Note Crisis (Nootti) was connected to the Berlin crisis that happened in the same year.

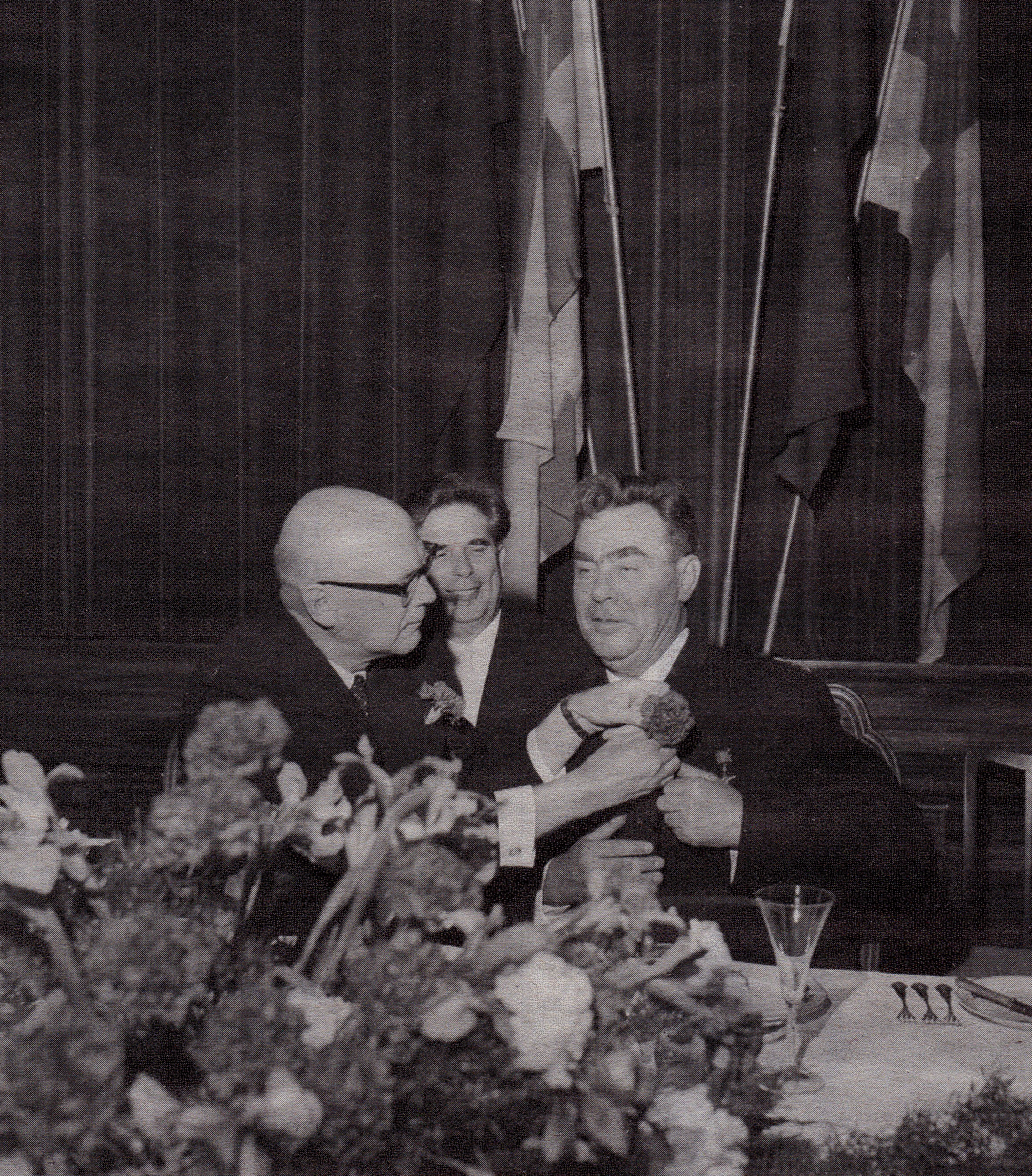
President Urho Kekkonen of Finland attaches a red carnation on Leonid Brezhnev's button hole at a lunch at the Soviet embassy in Helsinki in 1964.

Throughout the Cold War, Finland joined Western economic cooperation within the limits of its foreign policy latitude. The Soviet Union accepted Finland's becoming an associate member of EFTA in 1961. Finland became a full member of EFTA on 1 January 1986.

Finland also joined Western Europe's technology program Eureka when it was founded in July 1985. In the Soviet Union (then governed by Gorbachev), this course of development was regarded as "right-wing." At the same time, the Soviet economy faced growing difficulties, which caused a decline in trade between Finland and the Soviet Union.

During the period 1988–1991 when the Baltic states were pursuing independence from the Soviet Union, Finland initially avoided supporting the Baltic independence movement publicly, but did support it in the form of practical co-operation. However, after the failed 1991 August Coup in Russia, Finland recognized the Baltic states and restored diplomatic relations with them.

=== 1992–2022 ===
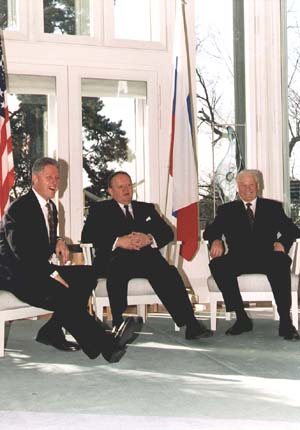
President of the United States Bill Clinton, President of Finland Martti Ahtisaari, and President of Russia Boris Yeltsin at Mäntyniemi in Helsinki, Finland, in 1997.

In 1990, the Eastern Bloc had dissolved, and on 26 December 1991, the Soviet Union dissolved.

During the 1990s, Russia fell into a state of social, political, and economic upheaval. Governments changed frequently, while inflation (→ Russian ruble) and interest rates remained high. The transition toward capitalism produced various negative side effects.

Finland's exports to Russia were at their highest in 2008. At that time, Russia became Finland's largest export destination. According to statistics, in 2008 Finnish exports to Russia totaled around 7.6 billion euros, accounting for nearly 12 percent of Finland's goods exports. This marked a peak period before a subsequent decline due to the global financial crisis and other factors.

Finland had a positive attitude toward the Nord Stream gas pipeline built between Germany and Russia. Former Finnish Prime Minister Paavo Lipponen lobbied in favor of the pipeline.

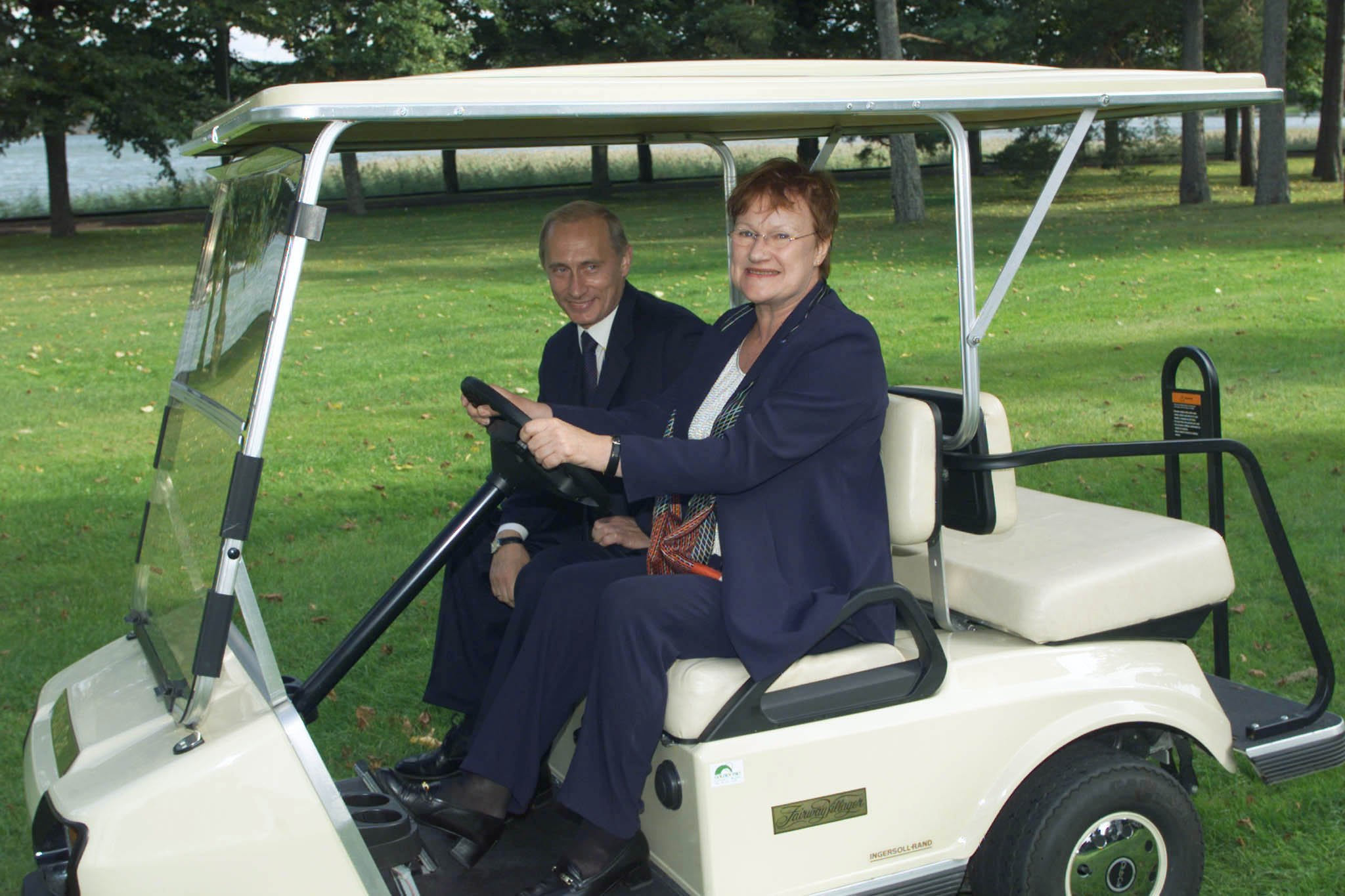
President of Russia Vladimir Putin and President of Finland Tarja Halonen in Finland in 2001.

Finland's relations with Russia were functional in the 2000s. President Tarja Halonen received presidents Putin and Medvedev in Finland. Halonen made reciprocal visits to Russia. Halonen visited Russia 27 times during her presidency. Finnish major corporations as well as small and medium-sized enterprises found the Russian market. Finland imported raw materials and energy from Russia. Russian tourism in Finland increased, and many Russians purchased holiday homes in Finland. A high-speed Allegro train connection was built between Helsinki and Saint Petersburg. In 2011, the border was crossed ten million times.

In March 2012, Sauli Niinistö became President of Finland. He established functional relations with President Putin. In March 2014, Russia annexed the Crimean Peninsula from Ukraine. The European Union imposed economic sanctions against Russia, which Finland adhered to. The EU sanctions were limited in scope, and as a result, Finland's economic relations with Russia largely remained unchanged. Trade between Finland and Russia had already declined from its peak in 2008, a downward trend driven by the global financial crisis, the fall in oil prices, the weakening of the ruble, and the EU sanctions.

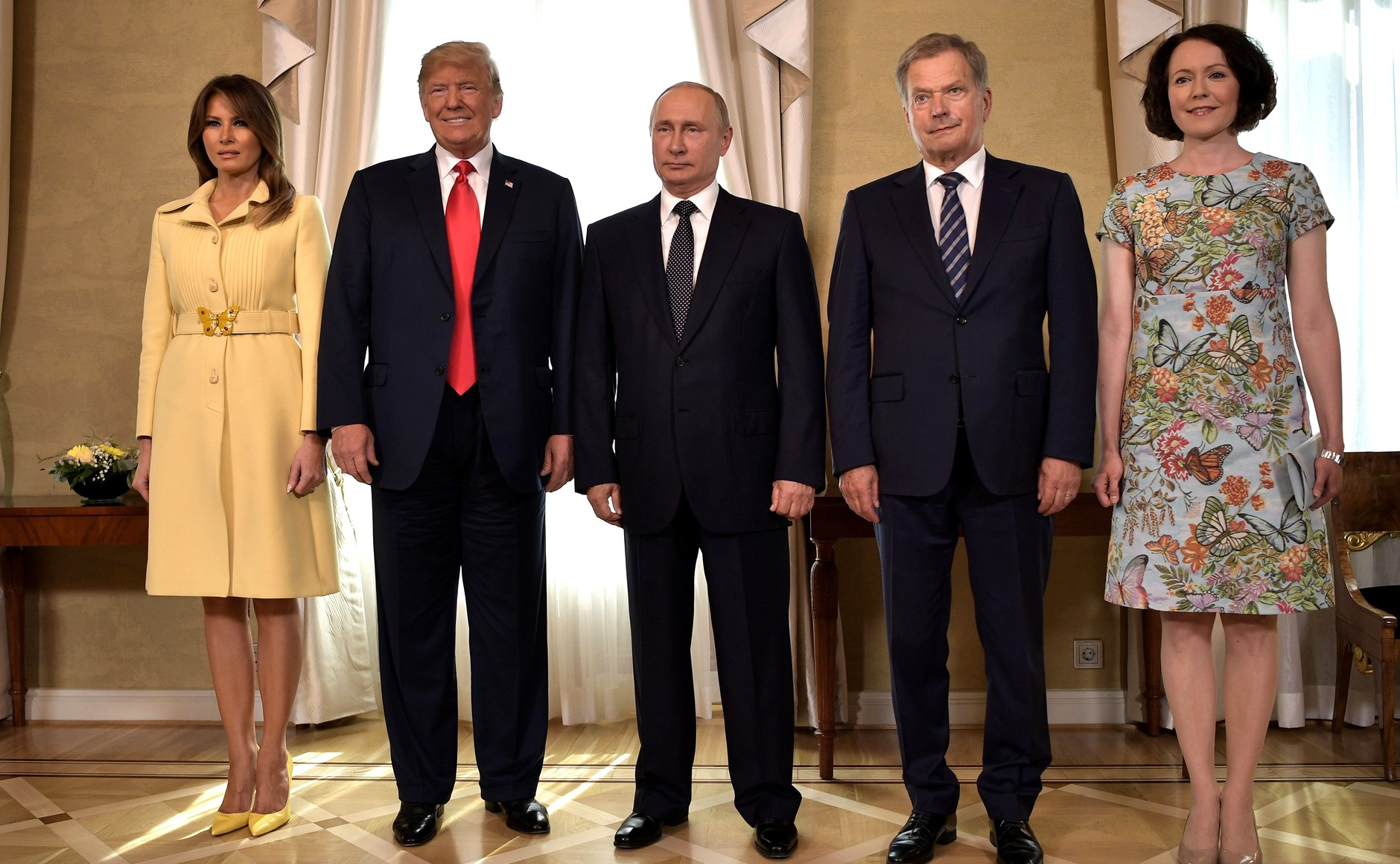
Presidents Donald Trump, Vladimir Putin, and Sauli Niinistö in Helsinki in 2018.

President Niinistö's guiding principle in foreign policy became the so-called policy of stability, through which he sought to improve relations between the West and Russia. An example of this was the meeting between U.S. President Trump and President Putin at the 2018 Russia–United States Summit.

In August 2019, President Putin paid a working visit to Finland, during which President Niinistö hosted a dinner for Putin and his entourage at Suomenlinna.

In October 2021, the presidents of Finland and Russia met in Moscow. The hiatus of several years was the result of the COVID-19 pandemic. At the time of the meeting, Moscow was experiencing a significant surge in new infections. The presidents discussed Arctic cooperation and the restoration of the Allegro train service, which had been suspended due to the pandemic.

=== 2022–present ===
After the 2022 Russian invasion of Ukraine started, Finland, as one of the EU countries, imposed sanctions on Russia, and Russia added all EU countries to the list of "unfriendly nations".

On 13 May 2022, Russia stopped the export of electricity to Finland.

In September 2022, Finland announced that it would not offer asylum to Russians fleeing mobilization.

On 6 June 2023 Finland expelled nine Russian diplomats, believed to be working for an intelligence service. In July 2023 Russia ordered the closure of the St Petersburg consulate and expelled nine diplomats. Entry into Finland for Russian citizens is limited for an indefinite period.

Having introduced a ban on Russian registered cars entering Finland in September 2023, a ban on Russians on bicycles was introduced in November 2023.

In November 2023, Finnish Prime Minister Petteri Orpo announced the closure of all but the northernmost border crossing with Russia, amid a sudden increase in asylum seekers seeking to enter Finland via Russia. Finland accused Russia of deliberately using refugees as weapons as part of its hybrid warfare following worsening relations between the two countries. Frontex subsequently announced that the EU would assist Finland in securing its eastern border. In February 2023, Finland has begun to build the Finland–Russia border barrier.

In 27 October 2026, Finnish President Alexander Stubb and Norwegian Prime Minister Jonas Gahr Støre called Russian President Putin. This marked the first time the presidents of the two countries had spoken in over four years. According to Stubb's office, the aim was to give Putin a direct message about upcoming negotiations to help end the war. Putin stated he supports all steps taken to restore relations with European countries.

== Spying in Finland ==
Russia is suspected of large-scale spying on the IT networks at the Finnish Ministry for Foreign Affairs. The spying focused on data traffic between Finland and the European Union, and is believed to have continued for four years. The spying was uncovered in spring 2013, and as of October 2013 the Finnish Security Intelligence Service (Supo) was investigating the breach.

== Economic relations ==
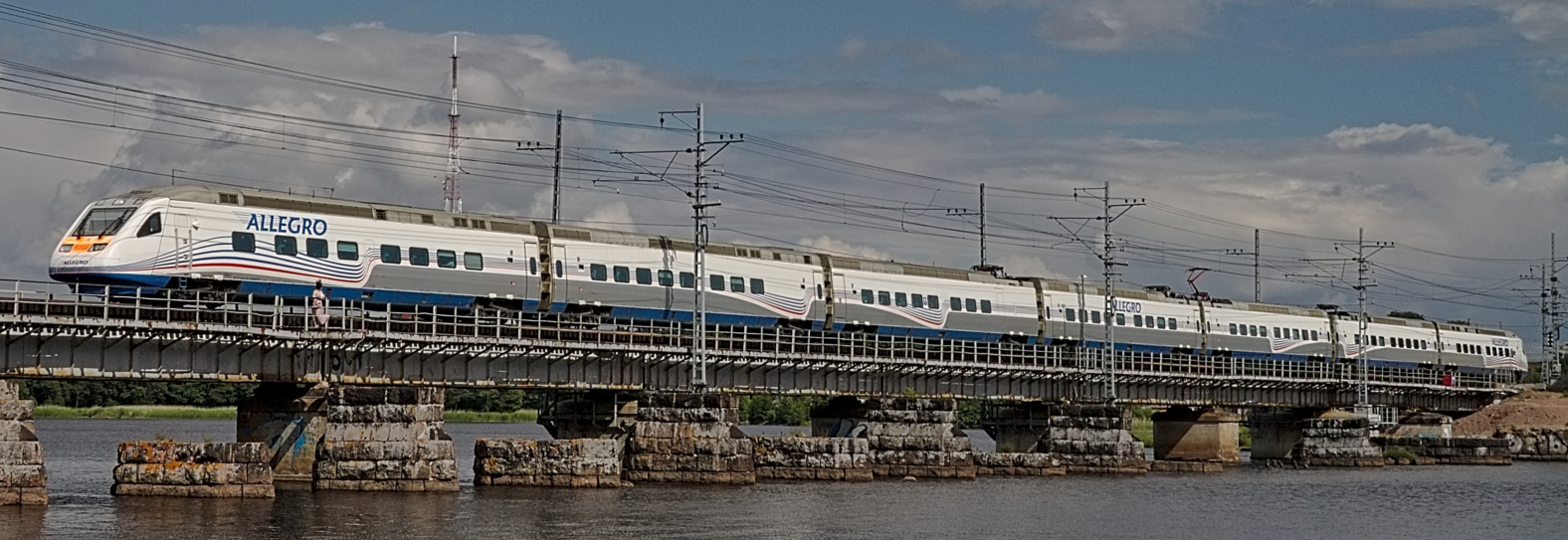
Allegro trains ran between Helsinki and St. Petersburg until March 2022.

Up until 1917, trade with the Russian Empire was dominated by paper products, grains, metals, and timber.

On 25 November 1953, an agreement between Finland and the Soviet Union was signed. Trade with the Soviet Union became a crucial part of the Finnish economy. It involved raw materials and crude oil, as well as consumer goods, most famous of which were Lada automobile imports, and dairy product exports, such as "Valio" cheese.

After the dissolution of the Soviet Union, import from Finland significantly increased thanks to private entrepreneurs. In 1995, Valio became one of the first foreign companies to officially establish production in Russia.

Before Russia's 2022 invasion of Ukraine, Russia was a major trade partner of Finland and cross-border business was considered strategic. Finland imported a large amount of raw materials, fuels and electricity from Russia. Finland operates the 1 GW Loviisa Nuclear Power Plant with Soviet technology, and (until May 2022) planned the 1.2 GW Hanhikivi Nuclear Power Plant with Russian technology. From midnight 13—14 May 2022, Russia suspended electricity supplies to Finland, forcing Finland to rely more on and improve its grid connections with Norway, Sweden and Estonia.

== Finnish NATO membership ==
In December 2021, Russian Ministry for Foreign Affairs pressured Finland and Sweden to refrain from joining NATO. Russia claims that NATO's persistent invitations for the two countries to join the military alliance would have major political and military consequences which would threaten stability in the Nordic region. Furthermore, Russia sees Finland's inclusion in NATO as a threat to Russian national security since the United States would likely be able to deploy military equipment in Finland if the country were to join NATO.

However, on 1 January 2022, Finland's president, Sauli Niinistö, reasserted Finnish sovereignty by stating that the Finnish government reserved the right to apply for NATO membership. Furthermore, Niinistö said that Russian demands threaten the "European security order". Additionally, he believes that transatlantic cooperation is needed for the maintenance of sovereignty and security of some EU member states, including Finland.

Subset of polls on Finnish membership of NATO shows opinion change after invasion of Ukraine
Dates conducted	Pollster	Client	Sample size	Support	Oppose	Neutral or DK	Lead	Ref.
3–16 Jan 2022	Kantar TNS	Helsingin Sanomat	1003	28%	42%	30%	14%	
24 February 2022	Russia invades Ukraine							
4–15 Mar 2022	Taloustutkimus	EVA	2074	60%	19%	21%	41%	
9–10 May 2022	Kantar TNS	Helsingin Sanomat	1002	73%	12%	15%	61%	

In the wake of the 24 February 2022 Russian invasion of Ukraine, support among the Finnish populace for NATO membership increased from below 30% to 60–70%. On 12 May 2022, Finnish President Niinistö and Finnish Prime Minister Sanna Marin announced that Finland would begin the process of applying for NATO membership. On 18 May 2022, Finland formally applied to join NATO, simultaneously with Sweden. Finland formally became a member of NATO on 4 April 2023 during a scheduled summit, finalizing the fastest accession process in the treaty's history. On 4 April 2023, the Russian Foreign Ministry reacted very strongly to Finland's accession to NATO, and the Ministry also announced that military measures would be taken at the highest level.

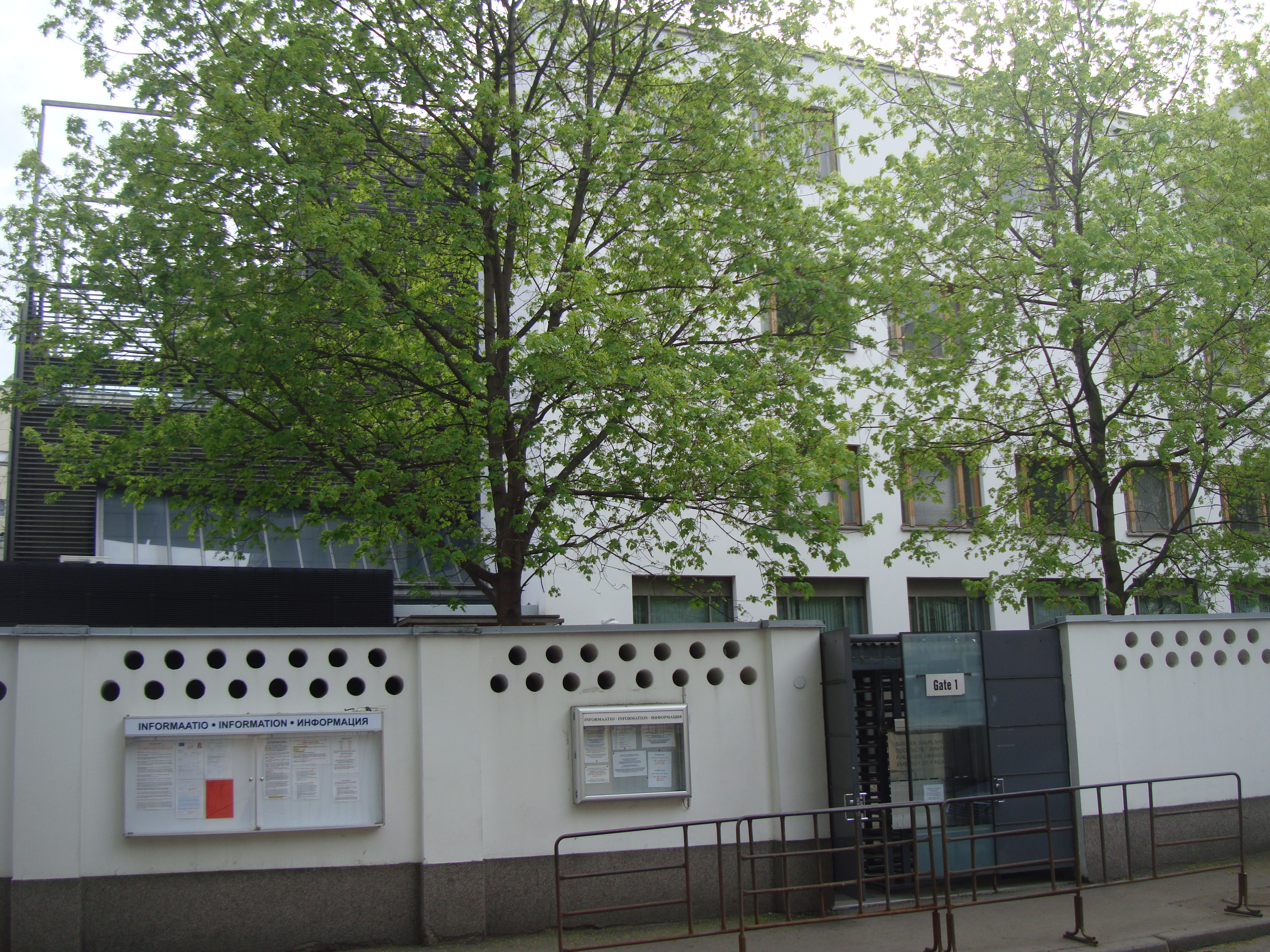
Embassy of Finland in Moscow

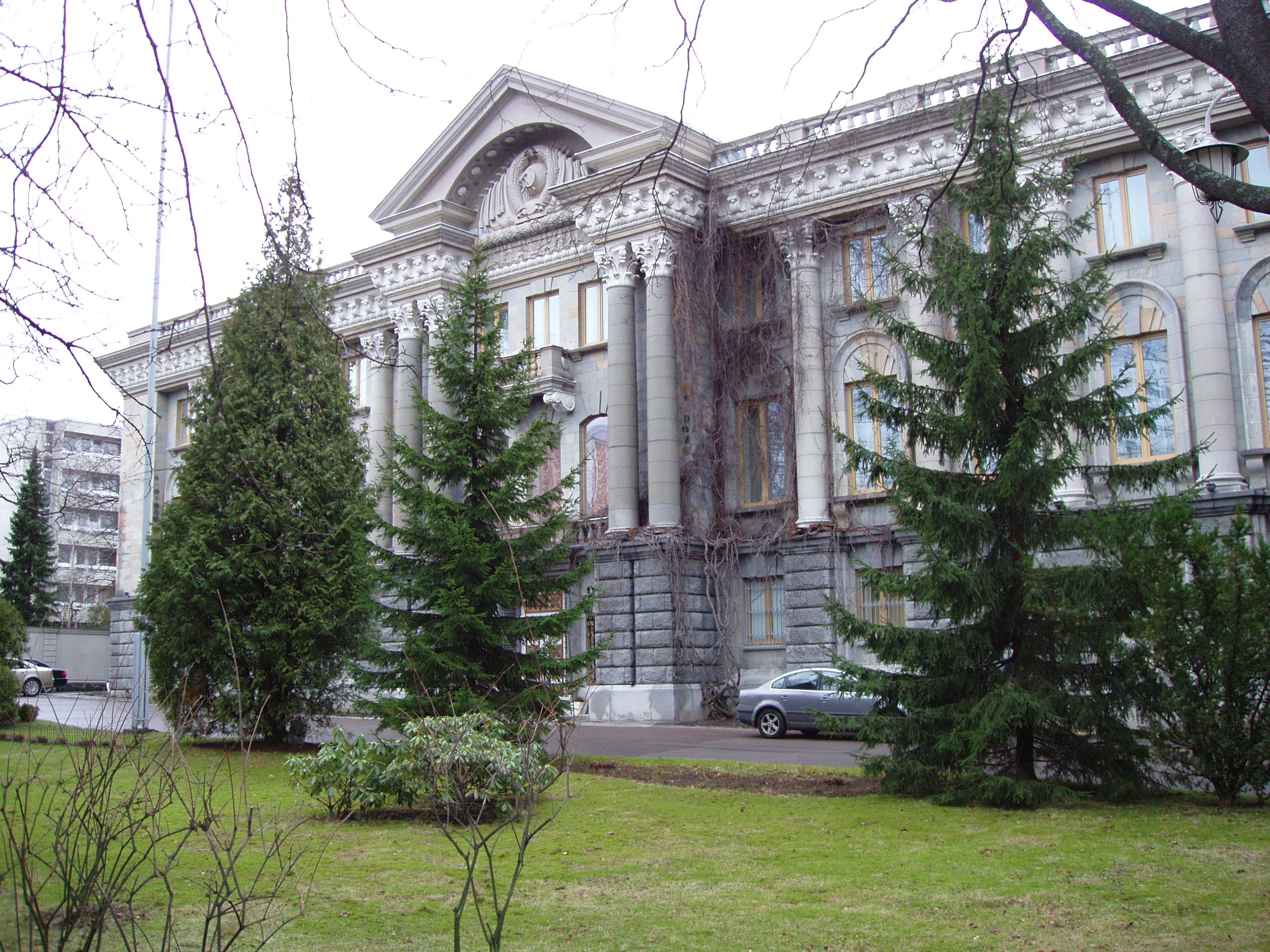
Embassy of Russia in Helsinki. Note the Soviet emblem bas-relief, which has not been removed since the dissolution of the Soviet Union.

== See also ==
- Foreign relations of Finland
- Foreign relations of Russia
- Russia–European Union relations
- EastCham Finland
- Finland–Russia Society
- Russia–NATO relations
- Russians in Finland
- Finland–Russia border
- List of ambassadors of Russia to Finland
