= Kustaa Vilkuna =

Finnish ethnologist, linguist, historian and politician (1902–1980)

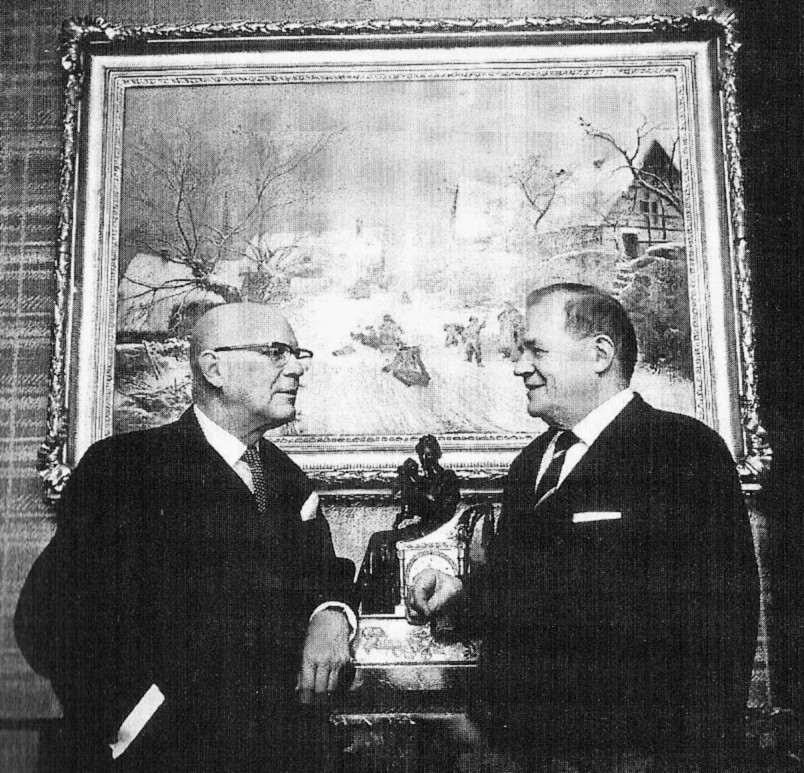
Kustaa Vilkuna (right) with President Urho Kekkonen

Kustaa Gideon Vilkuna (26 October 1902 in Nivala – 6 April 1980 in Kirkkonummi) was a Finnish ethnologist, linguist, and historian. Vilkuna was a member of the Academic Karelia Society (AKS) until resigning in 1932 and again from 1942 to 1944. He was appointed a professor of ethnology at the University of Helsinki in 1950. In politics, he was a member of the Agrarian League and the Minister of Education in Reino Kuuskoski's cabinet. He was also closely associated with President Urho Kekkonen, even being described as the éminence grise of Kekkonen.

His daughter Kirsti Vilkuna is the widow of the prominent Finnish industrialist Pekka Herlin. His grandsons Janne Vilkuna and Kustaa H. J. Vilkuna are historians as well.
