= Kekkonen (surname) =

Kekkonen (Finnish: [ˈkekːonen]) is a Finnish surname. Notable people with the surname include:

- Eenokki Kekkonen (1841–1909), Finnish farmworker; the grandfather of Urho Kekkonen
- Juho Kekkonen (politician) (1890–1951), Finnish schoolteacher and politician
- Juho Kekkonen (forester) (1873–1928), Finnish forester and tenant farmer; the father of Urho Kekkonen
- Urho Kekkonen (1900–1986), the President of Finland from 1956 to 1982.
- Sylvi Kekkonen (1900–1974), writer and wife of Urho Kekkonen
- Jussi Kekkonen (1910–1962), Finnish major, younger brother of Urho Kekkonen
- Helena Kekkonen (1926–2014), Finnish peace activist
- Matti Kekkonen (1928–2013), Finnish politician, son of Urho Kekkonen
- Taneli Kekkonen (1928–1985), Finnish diplomat, son of Urho Kekkonen
- Maria Kekkonen (born 1976), Finnish erotic actress and reporter
