= Juho Kekkonen =

Juho Kekkonen may refer to:

- Juho Kekkonen (forester) (1873–1928), Finnish forester and tenant farmer
- Juho Kekkonen (politician) (1890–1951), Finnish schoolteacher and politician
