= List of international presidential trips made by Urho Kekkonen =

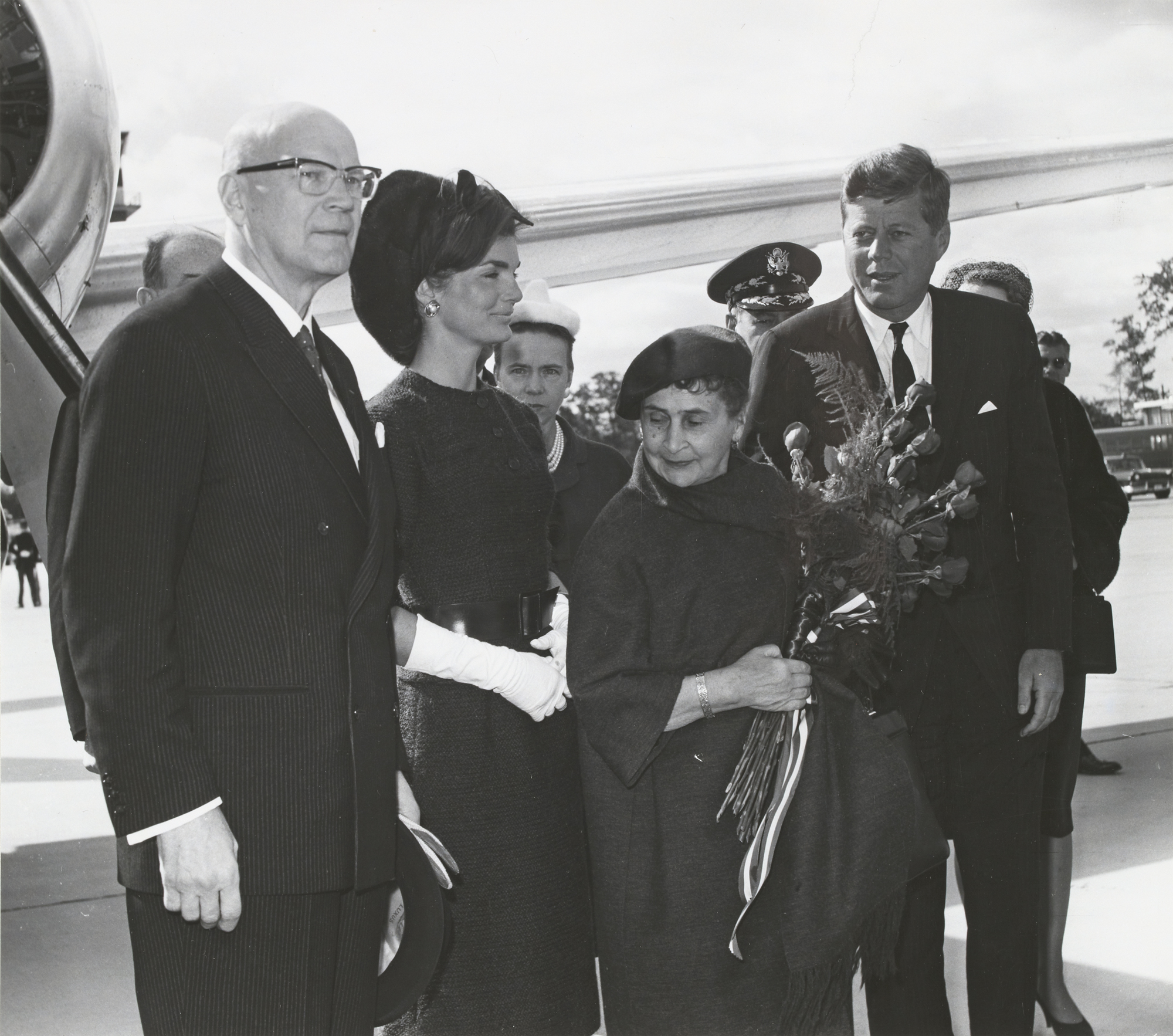
Urho Kekkonen (left), Sylvi Kekkonen (second right), John F. Kennedy, and Jacqueline Kennedy in 1961 in Washington Dulles International Airport.

Below is a complete list of presidential visits made by President of Finland Urho Kekkonen.

== List ==
Country	Dates	Host
Sweden	2–4 October 1956	King Gustaf VI Adolf of Sweden
Iceland	13–19 August 1957	President Ásgeir Ásgeirsson
Denmark	3–6 September 1957	King Frederik IX of Denmark
Norway	30 September–1 October 1957	King Olav V of Norway
Soviet Union	22–31 May 1958	general secretary Nikita Khrushchev
Soviet Union	21–25 January 1959	general secretary Nikita Khrushchev
Soviet Union	21–24 November 1960	general secretary Nikita Khrushchev
Norway	8–10 March 1961	King Olav V of Norway
United Kingdom	8–13 May 1961	Queen Elizabeth II
Austria	29 May–1 June 1962	President Adolf Schärf
Canada	10–16 October 1961	Prime Minister John Diefenbaker
United States	16 October–3 November 1961	President John F. Kennedy
United Nations	19 October 1961	Secretary General U Thant
Soviet Union	22–26 November 1961	general secretary Nikita Khrushchev
Soviet Union	3–18 October 1962	general secretary Nikita Khrushchev
France	24 October–4 November 1962	President Charles de Gaulle
Sweden	11–12 November 1962	King Gustaf VI Adolf of Sweden
Yugoslavia	4–12 May 1963	President Josip Broz Tito
Hungary	12–15 May 1963	general secretary János Kádár
Soviet Union	29 November–4 December 1963	general secretary Nikita Khrushchev
Poland	3–11 March 1964	general secretary Władysław Gomułka
Soviet Union	11–14 March 1964	general secretary Leonid Brezhnev
Soviet Union	16–18 April 1964	general secretary Leonid Brezhnev
India	10–21 February 1965	Prime Minister Lal Bahadur Shastri
Iran	11–12 February 1965	Shah Mohammad Reza Pahlavi
Soviet Union	21–26 February 1965	general secretary Leonid Brezhnev
Sweden	13 March 1965	King Gustaf VI Adolf of Sweden
Sweden	8–12 April 1965	King Gustaf VI Adolf of Sweden
Tunisia	3–10 October 1965	President Habib Bourguiba. Kekkonen climbed a palm tree there.
Soviet Union	19–23 December 1965	general secretary Leonid Brezhnev
Norway	20–24 June 1966	King Olav I of Norway
Soviet Union	25 August–2 September 1966	general secretary Leonid Brezhnev
Sweden	27–28 September 1966	King Gustaf VI Adolf of Sweden
Yugoslavia	23–25 January 1967	President Josip Broz Tito
United Arab Republic	25–30 January 1967	President Gamal Abdel Nasser
Bulgaria	30 January–1 February 1967	general secretary Todor Zhivkov
Denmark	8–11 June 1967	King Frederik IX of Denmark
Sweden	14–17 June 1967	King Gustaf VI Adolf of Sweden
Belgium	26–29 September 1967	King Baudouin I
Soviet Union	4–8 November 1967	general secretary Leonid Brezhnev
Soviet Union	13–24 June 1968	general secretary Leonid Brezhnev
Norway	28–30 August 1968	King Olav I of Norway
Senegal	2–16 January 1969	President Léopold Sédar Senghor
France	16–19 January 1969	President Charles de Gaulle
Sweden	7–10 March 1969	King Gustaf VI Adolf of Sweden
Sweden	2–5 May 1969	King Gustaf VI Adolf of Sweden
Soviet Union	19–21 May 1969	general secretary Leonid Brezhnev
United Kingdom	15–20 July 1969	Queen Elizabeth II
Soviet Union	29 July–3 August 1969	general secretary Leonid Brezhnev
Romania	22–26 September 1969	President Nicolae Ceaușescu
Hungary	26 September–1 October 1969	general secretary János Kádár
Czechoslovakia	1–4 October 1969	President Ludvík Svoboda
Bahamas	26 January–10 February 1970	General Governor Francis Hovell-Thurlow-Cumming-Bruce
Soviet Union	24–26 February 1970	general secretary Leonid Brezhnev
Soviet Union	16–20 July 1970	general secretary Leonid Brezhnev
United States	23–27 July 1970	President Richard Nixon
United Nations	19–27 October 1970	Secretary General U Thant
France	11–12 November 1970	President Georges Pompidou
Italy	27–29 January 1971	President Giuseppe Saragat
Vatican City	1 February 1971	Pope Paul VI
Soviet Union	23–25 February 1971	general secretary Leonid Brezhnev
Sweden	13–16 March 1971	King Gustaf VI Adolf of Sweden
Sweden	25 April–1 May 1971	Prime Minister Olof Palme
Turkey	7–12 June 1971	President Cevdet Sunay
Iceland	17–21 July 1971	President Kristján Eldjárn
Iran	14–17 October 1971	Shah Mohammed Reza Pahlavi
Soviet Union	17–18 October 1971	general secretary Leonid Brezhnev
Denmark	23–25 January 1972	Queen Margrethe II of Denmark
Soviet Union	25–27 February 1972	general secretary Leonid Brezhnev
Sweden	17–19 March 1972	King Gustaf VI Adolf of Sweden
United States	22–30 June 1972	Vacation
Soviet Union	12–18 August 1972	general secretary Leonid Brezhnev
Netherlands	24–27 October 1972	Queen Juliana of the Netherlands
Sweden	10–12 November 1972	King Gustaf VI Adolf of Sweden
Soviet Union	17–20 November 1972	general secretary Leonid Brezhnev
Soviet Union	20–24 December 1972	general secretary Leonid Brezhnev
Sweden	17–19 March 1973	Crown Prince Carl Gustaf
Poland	11–16 April 1973	general secretary Edward Gierek
Switzerland	11–12 June 1973	Federal President Roger Bonvin
Iceland	13–19 August 1973	President Kristján Eldjárn
Soviet Union	2–4 September 1973	general secretary Leonid Brezhnev
Sweden	24–25 September 1973	King Carl XVI Gustaf of Sweden
Soviet Union	15–18 February 1974	general secretary Leonid Brezhnev
Sweden	15–17 March 1974	Prime Minister Olof Palme
Mexico	30 March–7 April 1974	President Luis Echeverría Álvarez
Austria	28–30 April 1974	Federal President Rudolf Kirchschläger
Soviet Union	7–9 September 1974	general secretary Leonid Brezhnev
Soviet Union	12–14 March 1975	general secretary Leonid Brezhnev
Yugoslavia	21–25 March 1975	President Josip Broz Tito
Iceland	13–18 August 1975	President Kristján Eldjárn
Soviet Union	1 September 1975	general secretary Leonid Brezhnev
Sweden	21–24 October 1975	King Carl XVI Gustaf of Sweden
Cape Verde	7 February 1976	Vacation
Spain (Tenerife)	7–8 February 1976	Vacation
Brazil	7–21 February 1976	President Ernesto Geisel
Spain (Tenerife)	18–21 February 1976	Vacation
Sweden	18–21 March 1976	King Carl XVI of Sweden
Sweden	18–19 June 1976	King Carl XVI Gustaf of Sweden and Queen Silvia Sommerlat royal wedding
Soviet Union	21–28 June 1976	general secretary Leonid Brezhnev
United States	30 July–5 August 1976	President Gerald Ford
Norway	15–16 September 1976	King Olav V of Norway
Hungary	17–20 November 1976	general secretary János Kádár
Sweden	27–28 November 1976	King Carl XVI Gustaf of Sweden
Soviet Union	17 December 1976	general secretary Leonid Brezhnev
Sweden	26 January 1977	King Carl XVI Gustaf of Sweden
Soviet Union	17–24 May 1977	general secretary Leonid Brezhnev
Norway	18–19 June 1977	King Olav V of Norway
Iceland	10–12 August 1977	President Kristján Eldjárn
East Germany	6–9 September 1977	general secretary Erich Honecker
Sweden	27 September 1977	King Carl XVI Gustaf of Sweden
Sweden	30 September–1 October 1977	King Carl XVI Gustaf of Sweden
Sweden	8–9 October 1977	King Carl XVI Gustaf of Sweden
Denmark	11–14 October 1977	Queen Margrethe II of Denmark
Soviet Union	5–11 August 1978	general secretary Leonid Brezhnev
Iceland	13–20 August 1978	President Kristján Eldjárn
Soviet Union	14–17 September 1978	general secretary Leonid Brezhnev
Spain	10–13 December 1978	King Juan Carlos
West Germany	7–11 May 1979	Federal Chancellor Helmut Schmidt
Sweden	31 August 1979	King Carl XVI Gustaf of Sweden
Yugoslavia	7–8 May 1980	President Lazar Koliševski
Soviet Union	26–30 July 1980	general secretary Leonid Brezhnev
Soviet Union	12–17 November 1980	general secretary Leonid Brezhnev
Iceland	17–21 August 1981	President Vigdís Finnbogadóttir
