= Urho Kekkonen =

President of Finland from 1956 to 1982

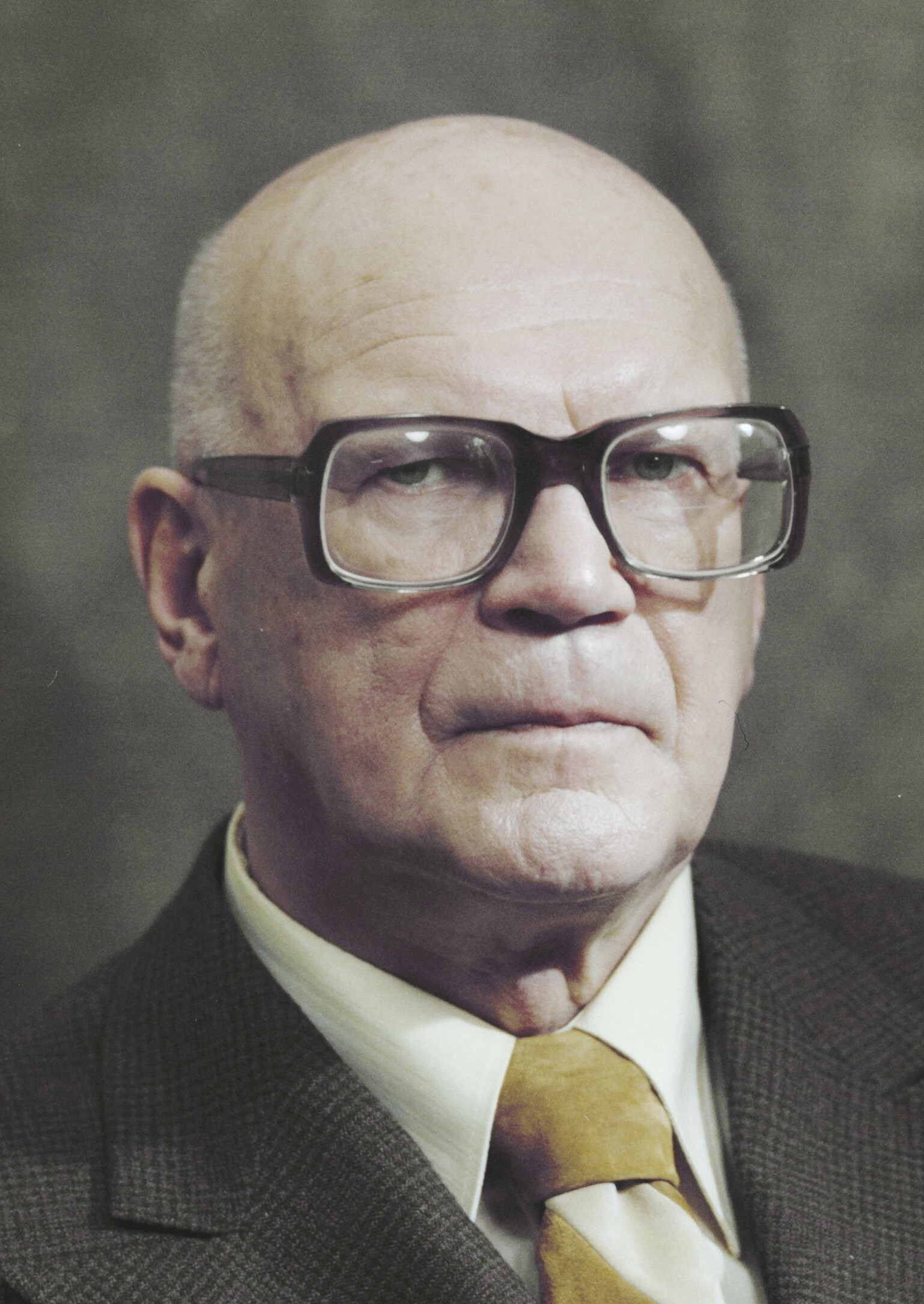
- Kekkonen in 1975

8th President of Finland
- In office 1 March 1956 – 27 January 1982
- Prime Minister: See list: Karl-August Fagerholm; Vieno Sukselainen; Rainer von Fieandt; Reino Kuuskoski; Martti Miettunen; Ahti Karjalainen; Johannes Virolainen; Rafael Paasio; Mauno Koivisto; Teuvo Aura; Kalevi Sorsa; Keijo Liinamaa
- Preceded by: Juho Kusti Paasikivi
- Succeeded by: Mauno Koivisto

21st Prime Minister of Finland
- In office 20 October 1954 – 3 March 1956
- President: Juho Kusti Paasikivi
- Preceded by: Ralf Törngren
- Succeeded by: Karl-August Fagerholm
- In office 17 March 1950 – 17 November 1953
- President: Juho Kusti Paasikivi
- Preceded by: Karl-August Fagerholm
- Succeeded by: Sakari Tuomioja

Minister of Foreign Affairs
- In office 1952–1953
- In office 1954

Speaker of the Finnish Parliament
- In office 1948–1950

Deputy Speaker of the Finnish Parliament
- In office 1946–1947

Minister of the Interior
- In office 1937–1939
- In office 1950–1951

Minister of Justice
- In office 1936–1937
- In office 1944–1946
- In office 1951

Member of the Finnish Parliament
- In office 1936 – 1 March 1956

Personal details
- Born: Urho Kaleva Kekkonen; 3 September 1900 Pielavesi, Grand Duchy of Finland, Russian Empire
- Died: 31 August 1986 (aged 85) Helsinki, Finland
- Resting place: Hietaniemi Cemetery
- Party: Centre (Note: Known as the Agrarian League until 1965)
- Spouse: Sylvi Kekkonen (m. 1926; died 1974)
- Children: Matti, Taneli
- Parent: Juho Kekkonen (father)
- Relatives: Eenokki Kekkonen (grandfather); Jussi Kekkonen (brother)
- Education: University of Helsinki
- Occupation: Lawyer; police officer; journalist; politician
- Nickname(s): UKK, Urkki

Urho Kaleva Kekkonen (Note: Finnish pronunciation: [ˈurho ˈkɑleʋɑ ˈkekːonen]) (3 September 1900 – 31 August 1986), often referred to by his initials UKK, was a Finnish politician who served as the eighth and longest-serving president of Finland from 1956 to 1982. He also served as prime minister (1950–1953, 1954–1956), and held various other cabinet positions. He was the third and most recent president from the Agrarian League/Centre Party. Head of state for nearly 26 years, he dominated Finnish politics for 31 years overall. Holding a large amount of power, he won his later elections with little opposition and has often been classified as an autocrat.

As president, Kekkonen continued the "active neutrality" policy of his predecessor President Juho Kusti Paasikivi that came to be known as the Paasikivi–Kekkonen doctrine, under which Finland was to retain its independence while maintaining good relations and extensive trade with members of both NATO and the Warsaw Pact. Critical commentators referred to this policy of appeasement pejoratively as Finlandization. He is credited by Finnish historians for his foreign and trade policies, which allowed Finland's market economy to keep pace with Western Europe even with the Soviet Union as a neighbor, and for Finland to gradually take part in the European integration process. On the other hand, his perceived autocracy, divide-and-rule attitude in domestic politics and the lack of genuine political opposition, especially during the latter part of his presidency, significantly weakened Finnish democracy during his presidency. Kekkonen was nominated for the Nobel Peace Prize in 1962 for his "tireless efforts and success at keeping peace and security in the Nordic countries, and therefore contributing to civic peace and reconciliation in the World". He was also considered a potential candidate for the prize on later occasions.

Narrowly elected in the 1956 presidential election, Kekkonen consolidated power by successfully presenting himself as an indispensable "guarantor" of Soviet relations in a tense and politically unstable period. He was reelected in 1962 in the aftermath of the Note Crisis and the withdrawal of the main opposition candidate. Kekkonen typically favoured appointing "popular front" cabinets composed of centrist and left-wing parties trusted by the Soviet Union while leaving out the major right-wing National Coalition Party. He was elected to a third six-year term in 1968 and achieved the height of his power in the 1970s; in 1973, an emergency law extending his term by four years passed the Parliament with 170 votes for and only 28 against. In 1975, considered the peak year of his career, Kekkonen hosted the Conference on Security and Co-operation in Europe in Helsinki and resolved a domestic political crisis by pressuring party leaders into joining a new "popular front" cabinet in front of television cameras. He was elected to his fourth and final term by an overwhelming margin in 1978, but his health and mental faculties visibly deteriorated, forcing him to submit his resignation in late 1981 and retire. After Kekkonen's presidency, the reform of the Constitution of Finland was initiated by his successors to increase the power of the Parliament and the prime minister at the expense of the president and to introduce a term limit.

Kekkonen was a member of the Parliament of Finland from 1936 until his rise to the presidency. Either prior, during or between his premierships, he served as minister of justice (1936–37, 1944–46, 1951), minister of the interior (1937–39, 1950–51), speaker of the Finnish Parliament (1948–50) and minister of foreign affairs (1952–53, 1954). In addition to his extensive political career, he was a lawyer by education, a policeman and athlete in his youth, a veteran of the Finnish Civil War, and an enthusiastic writer. During World War II, his anonymous reports on the war and foreign politics received a large audience in the Suomen Kuvalehti magazine. Even during his presidency, he wrote humorous, informal columns (causerie) for the same magazine, edited by his long-time friend Ilmari Turja, under several pseudonyms.

== Biography ==
=== Family history ===
The Kekkonens are an old Savonian family. They most likely settled in the Savonia region before the 16th century. Although it is not known where the Kekkonens came to Savonia from, there has been speculation that they are from Karelia as people with the name were known to have lived in certain settlements of the Karelian Isthmus for centuries. Kekkonen himself thought it possible that the family might instead originate from Western Finland, for example from Tavastia, where there have been place names connected to their surname from as early as the 15th century. His seventh-great-grandfather Tuomas Kekkonen (born ca. 1630) is first mentioned in documents in Pieksämäki in 1673. He was probably from either Kangasniemi or Joroinen.

Twelve generations of Kekkonen's ancestors were peasants from eastern Finland. The paternal side of his family practised slash-and-burn agriculture and the maternal side stayed on their own site. Kekkonen's paternal grandfather Eenokki was part of a landless group grown in the 19th century and lived on temporary work and working as a farmworker. Although Kekkonen never met his grandfather (he was 9 years old when Eenokki died), he often drew on his teachings, as their shared one belief about working: a man must be greedy for work.

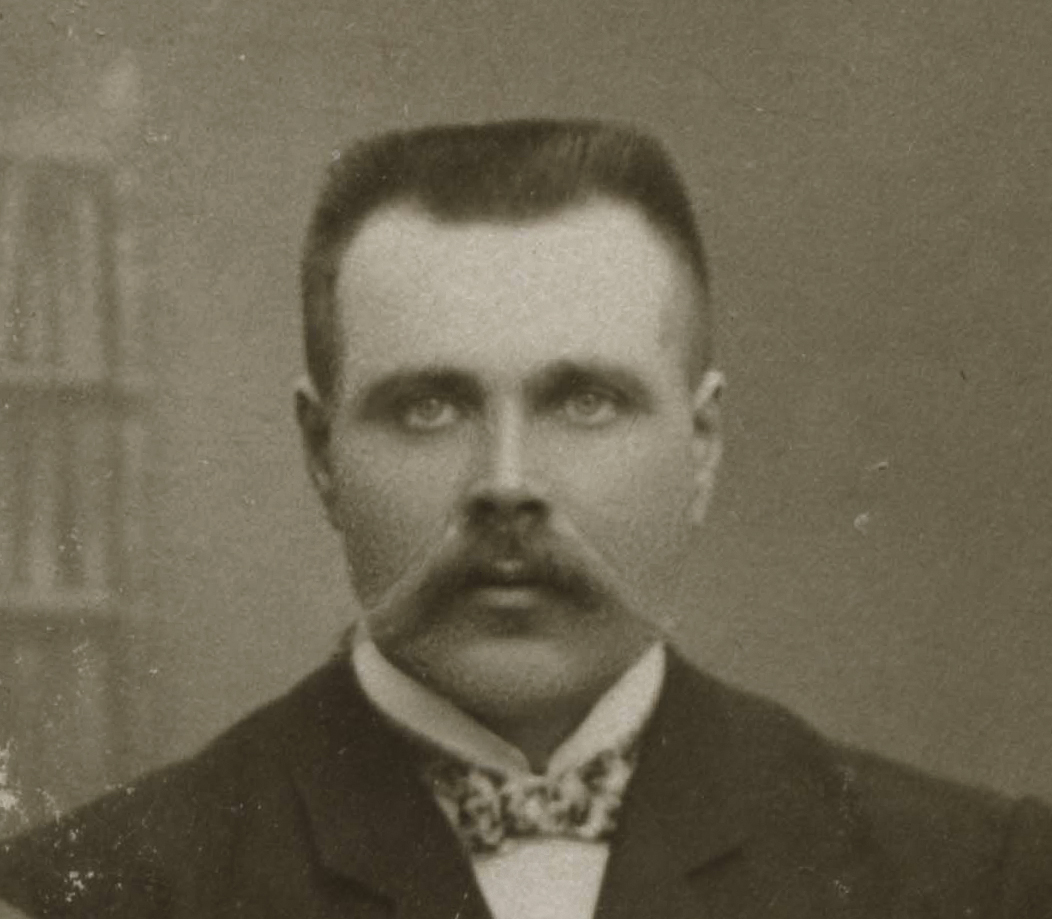
Juho Kekkonen, Urho Kekkonen's father

After serving in several houses, Eenokki Kekkonen married Anna-Liisa Koskinen. They had four sons, Taavetti, Johannes, Alpertti and Juho. Juho, the youngest son of the family, who had gone travelling from the family's home in Korvenmökki in the village of Koivujärvi, was Urho's father. Aatu Pylvänäinen, Urho Kekkonen's maternal grandfather, who worked as a farmer at the Tarkkala farm in Kangasniemi, married Amanda Manninen in the summer of 1878 when she was 16 years old. Their children, three daughters and three sons, were Emilia, Elsa, Siilas, Tyyne, Eetu, and Samuel.

As the son of a poor family, Juho had to go to work in the forest and ended up at a log working ground in Kangasniemi in 1898. Emilia Pylvänäinen herded cattle there, on the shores of the Haahkala lands, where Juho worked with other loggers. The two youngsters got to know each other and they married in 1899. The couple moved to Otava, where Juho Kekkonen got a job at the Koivusaha sawmill of Halla Oy. He was later appointed the head of forestry work and caretaker of the logging business.

The couple moved to Pielavesi along with the working grounds, where Juho bought a smoke hut which he later repaired and expanded into a proper house. He built a chimney in the house shortly before the birth of his first son Urho. Because of the beautiful alders growing behind the house, the house became known as Lepikon torppa (lit. 'croft of alders'). There was a smoke sauna in the yard, where Urho was born on 3 September 1900. The family lived in Lepikon torppa for six years, and Urho's sister Siiri was born in 1904. The family moved with Juho's forestry work to Kuopio in 1906 and to Lapinlahti in 1908. The family had to live modestly but did not suffer from poverty. The youngest child of the family, Jussi, was born in 1910.

=== Early life ===
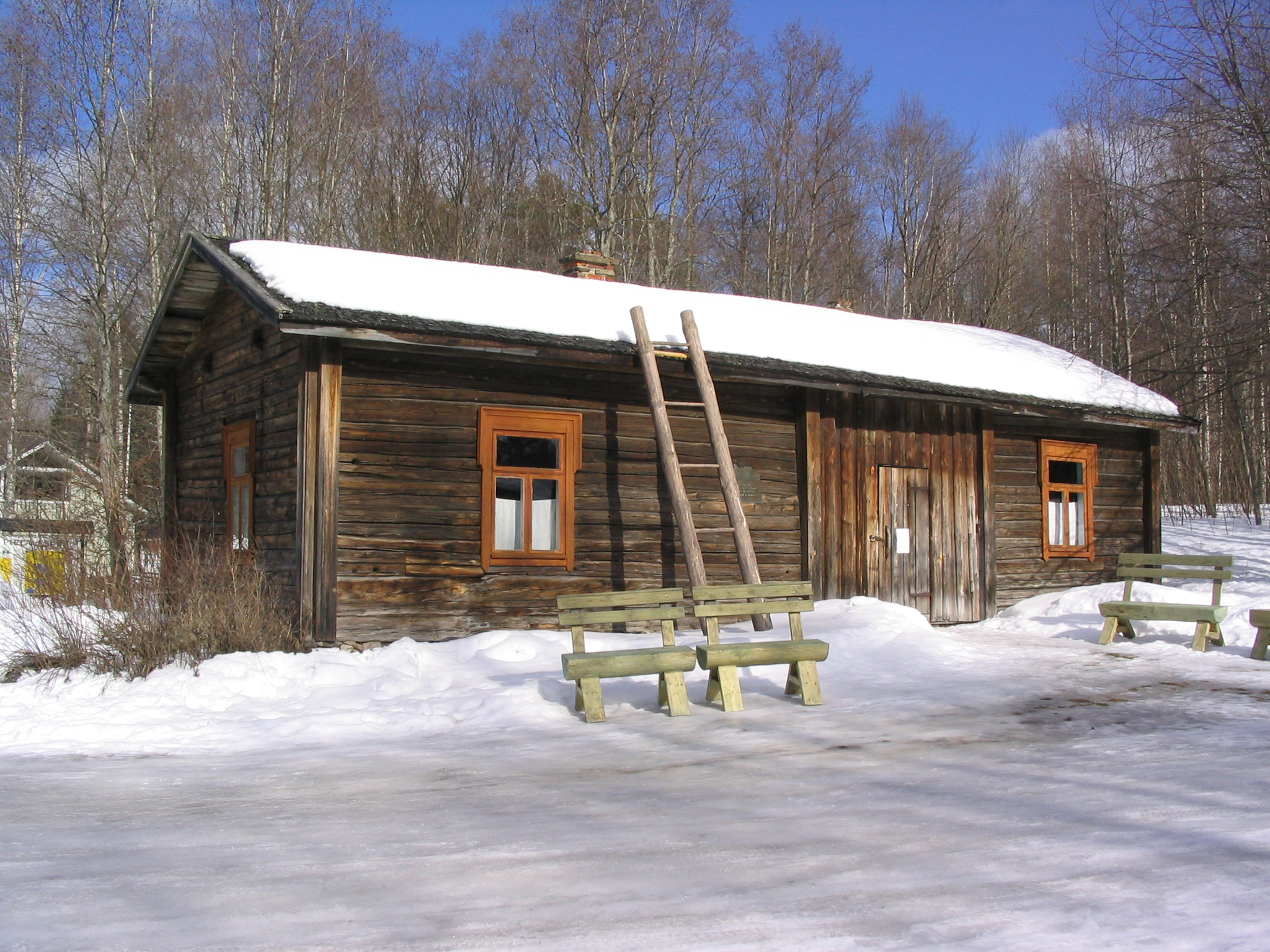
Kekkonen was born in a humble, small log cabin called Lepikon torppa in Pielavesi.

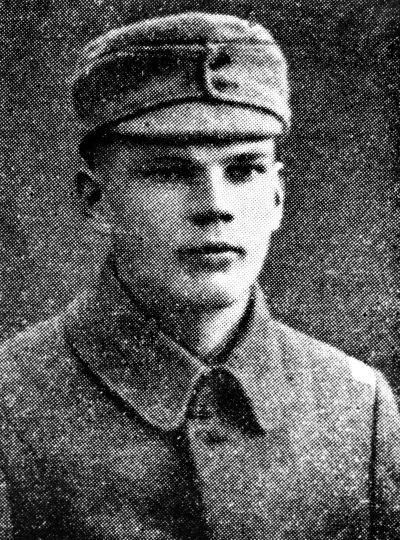
17-year-old Kekkonen in 1917.

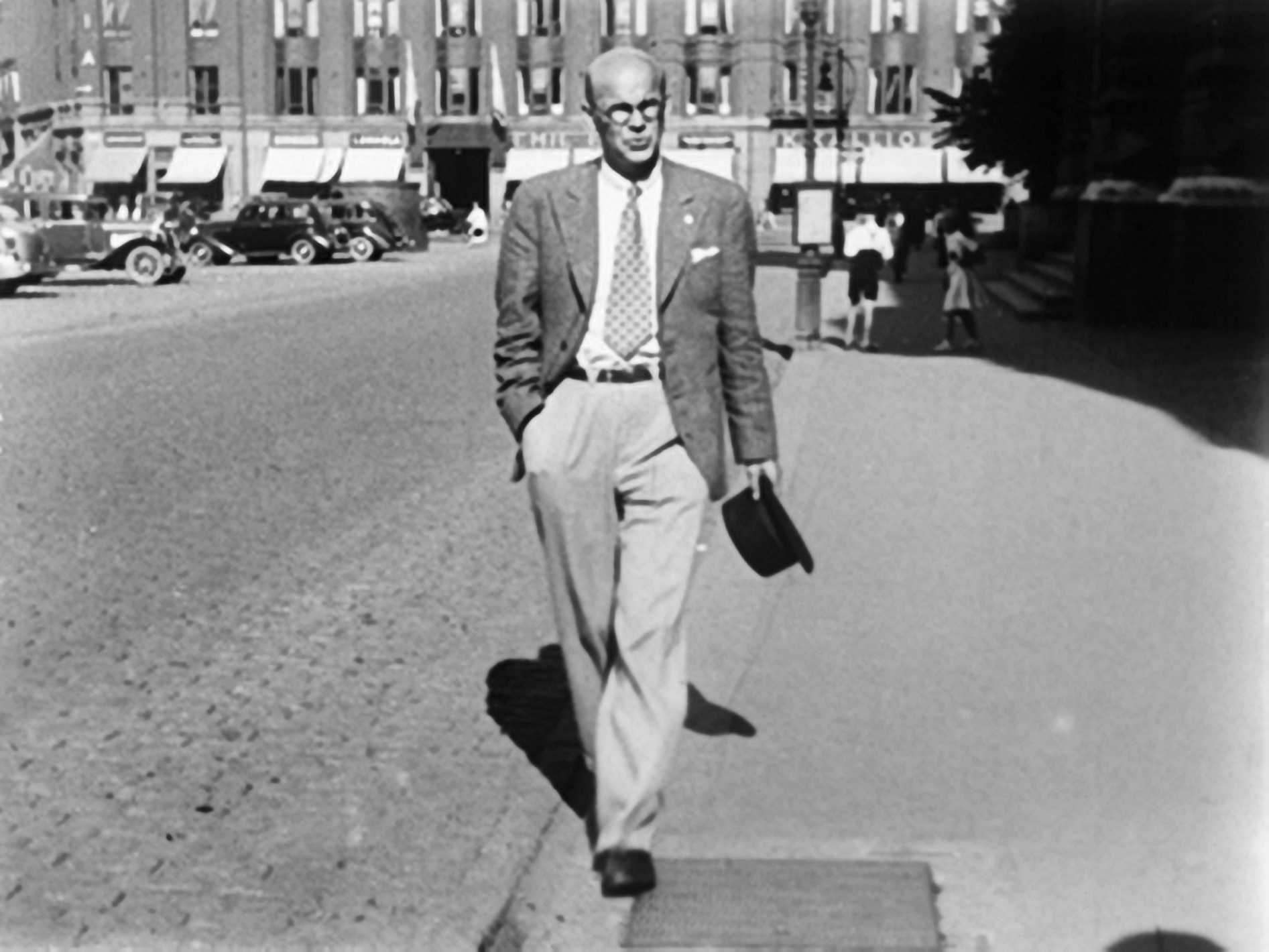
Young lawyer Kekkonen walking near Ateneum, Helsinki, in the early 1930s

The son of Juho Kekkonen and Emilia Pylvänäinen, Urho Kekkonen was born at Lepikon torppa ("the Lepikko torp"), a small cabin located in Pielavesi, in the Savo region of Finland, and spent his childhood in Kainuu. His family were farmers, though not poor tenant farmers, as some of his supporters later claimed. His father was originally a farm-hand and forestry worker who rose to become a forestry manager and stock agent at Halla Ltd. Claims made that Kekkonen's family had lived in a rudimentary farmhouse with no chimney were later proved to be false—a photograph of Kekkonen's childhood home had been retouched to remove the chimney. His school years did not go smoothly. During the Finnish Civil War, Kekkonen fought for the Kajaani chapter of the White Guard, fighting in the battles of Kuopio, Varkaus, Mouhu, and Viipuri, and taking part in mop-up operations, including leading a firing squad in Hamina. He later admitted to having killed a man in battle, but wrote in his memoirs that he was randomly selected by his company commander to follow a squad escorting ten prisoners, where the squad turned out to be a firing squad, and then to give the actual order to aim and fire. He had to complete further military service after the war, which he did in a car battalion from 1919 to 1920, finishing as a sergeant.

In independent Finland, Kekkonen first worked as a journalist in Kajaani then moved to Helsinki in 1921 to study law. While studying he worked for the security police EK between 1921 and 1927, where he became acquainted with anti-communist policing. During this time he also met his future wife, Sylvi Salome Uino (12 March 1900 – 2 December 1974), a typist at the police station. They had two sons, Matti (1928–2013) and Taneli (1928–1985). Matti Kekkonen served as a Centre Party member of Parliament from 1958 to 1969, and Taneli Kekkonen worked as an ambassador in Belgrade, Athens, Rome, Malta, Warsaw and Tel Aviv.

Kekkonen had a reputation as a heavy-handed, violent interrogator during his years in the security police. Conversely, he described himself as taking the role of a humane "good cop" to balance out his older and more abusive colleagues. Some of the communists he interrogated confirmed the latter account, while others accused him of having been particularly violent. Later, as a minister in the 1950s, he is said to have visited and made peace with a communist he had "beaten up" in an interrogation in the 1920s. Explaining the contradiction of these statements, author Timo J. Tuikka says Kekkonen's interrogation methods evolved over time: "He learned that the fist is not always the most efficient tool, but that booze, sauna and chatting are much better means of obtaining information." These revelatory experiences would significantly influence his career and approach to politics later on. Kekkonen eventually had to resign from the EK after criticising his superiors.

In 1927 Kekkonen became a lawyer and worked for the Association of Rural Municipalities until 1932. Kekkonen took a Doctor of Laws degree in 1936 at the University of Helsinki where he was active in the Pohjois-Pohjalainen Osakunta, a student nation for students from northern Ostrobothnia, and editor-in-chief of the student newspaper Ylioppilaslehti in the period 1927–1928. He was also an athlete whose greatest achievement was to become the Finnish high jump champion in 1924 with a jump of 1.85 metres (6 ft 1 in). He was best at the standing jump.

=== Early political career ===
A nationalist at heart, Kekkonen's ideological roots lay in the student politics of newly independent Finland and in the radicalism of the right-wing. He joined the Academic Karelia Society (Akateeminen Karjala-Seura), an organisation favouring Finland's annexation of East Karelia, but resigned from it in 1932 along with over 100 other moderate members because of the organisation's support for the 1932 far-right Mäntsälä rebellion. According to Johannes Virolainen, a longtime Agrarian and Centrist politician, some Finnish right-wingers hated and mocked Kekkonen for the decision and cast him as a power-hungry opportunist. Kekkonen chaired Suomalaisuuden Liitto, another nationalist organisation, from 1930 to 1932. He also published articles in its magazine, Suomalainen Suomi (Finnish: Finnish Finland), which was later renamed as Kanava.

Kekkonen spent long periods of time in late-Weimar-era Germany between 1931 and 1933 while working on his dissertation and there witnessed the rise of Adolf Hitler. This alerted him to far-right radicalism and apparently led him to publish Demokratian itsepuolustus (Self-Defense of Democracy), a political pamphlet warning about the danger, in 1934. In 1933 he joined the Agrarian League (later renamed the Centre Party), became a civil servant at the Ministry of Agriculture and made his first unsuccessful attempt at getting elected to the Finnish Parliament.

Kekkonen successfully stood for parliament a second time in 1936 whereupon he became Justice Minister, serving from 1936 to 1937. During his term, he enacted the "Tricks of Kekkonen" (Kekkosen konstit), an attempt to ban the right-wing, radical Patriotic People's Movement (Isänmaallinen Kansanliike, IKL). In the end, this effort was found illegal and halted by the Supreme Court. Kekkonen was also Minister of the Interior from 1937 to 1939.

He was not a member of the cabinets during the Winter War or the Continuation War. In March 1940, in a meeting of the Committee on Foreign Affairs of the Finnish Parliament, he voted against the Moscow Peace Treaty. During the Continuation War, Kekkonen served as director of the Karelian Evacuees' Welfare Centre from 1940 to 1943 and as the Ministry of Finance's commissioner for coordination from 1943 to 1945, tasked with rationalising public administration. By that time, he had become one of the leading politicians within the so-called Peace opposition which advocated withdrawing from the war, having concluded that Germany, and consequently Finland, would lose. In 1944, he again became Minister of Justice, serving until 1946, and had to deal with the war-responsibility trials. Kekkonen was a Deputy Speaker of the Parliament 1946–1947, and was Speaker from 1948 to 1950.

In the 1950 Presidential election, Kekkonen was the candidate of the Finnish Agrarian League. He conducted a vigorous campaign against incumbent President Juho Kusti Paasikivi to finish third in the first and only ballot, receiving 62 votes in the electoral college, while Paasikivi was reelected with 171. After the election, Paasikivi appointed Kekkonen Prime Minister where in all his five cabinets, he emphasised the need to maintain friendly relations with the Soviet Union. Known for his authoritarian personality, he was ousted in 1953 but returned as Prime Minister from 1954 to 1956. Kekkonen also served as Minister of Foreign Affairs for periods in 1952–1953 and 1954, concurrent with his prime ministership.

=== President of Finland ===
==== Overview ====
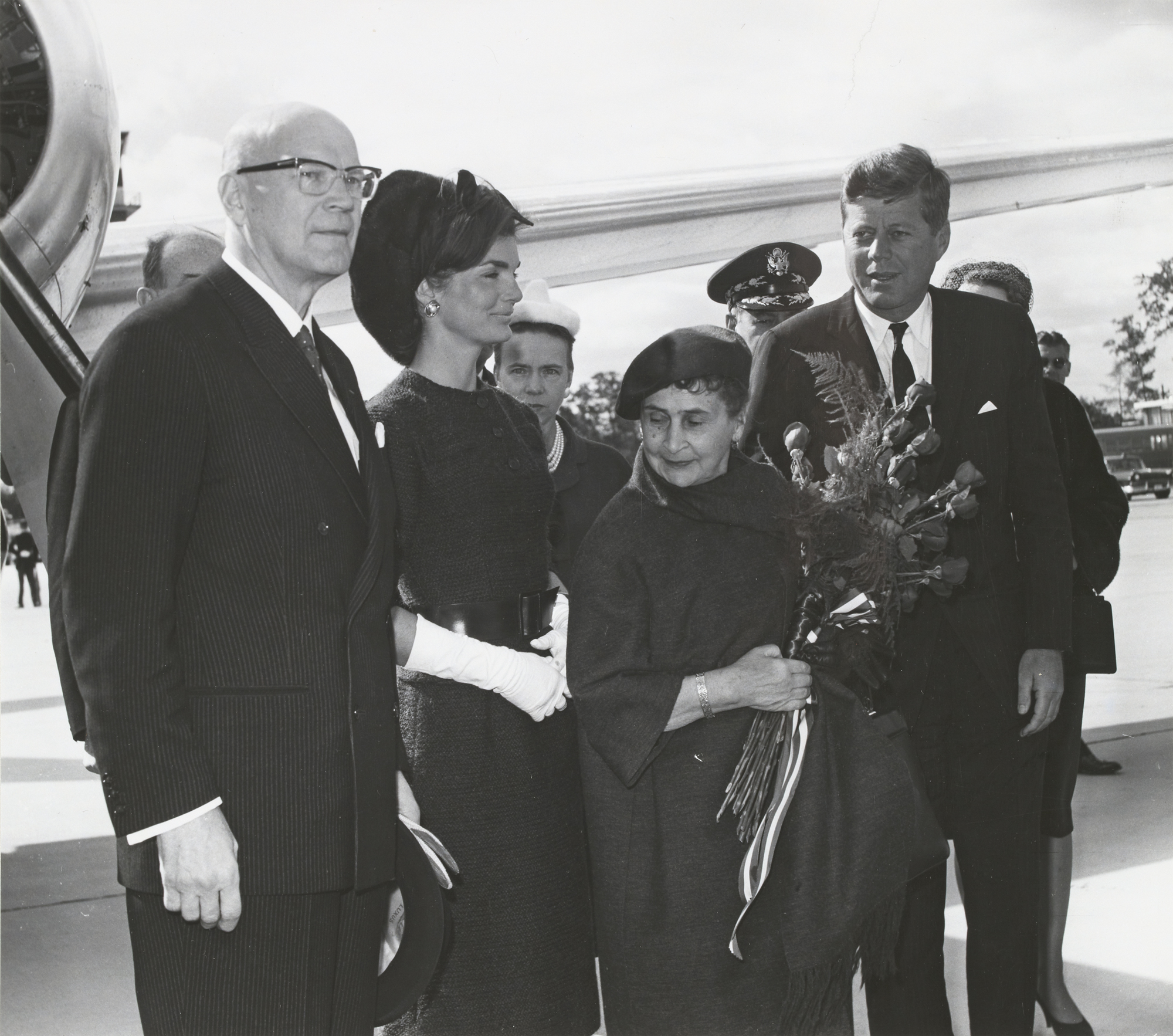
Urho Kekkonen (left), Sylvi Kekkonen (second right), John F. Kennedy, and Jacqueline Kennedy in 1961 in Washington Dulles International Airport

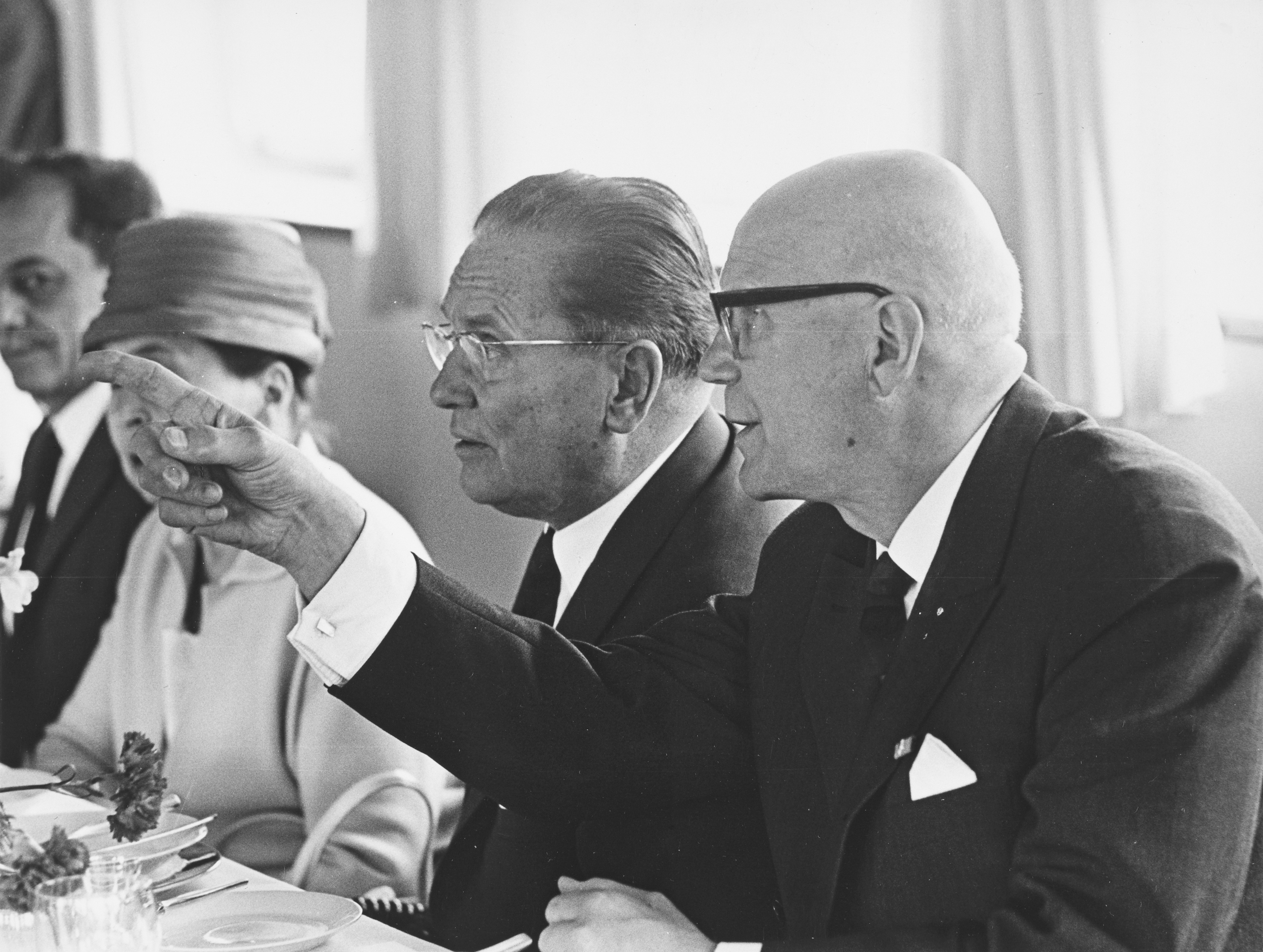
Kekkonen receiving Yugoslav leader Tito in Helsinki, 1964

During Kekkonen's term, the balance of power between the Finnish Government and the President tilted heavily towards the President. In principle and formally, parliamentarism was followed with governments nominated by a parliamentary majority. However, Kekkonen-era cabinets were often in bitter internal disagreement and alliances formed broke down easily. New cabinets often tried to reverse their predecessors' policies. Kekkonen used his power extensively to nominate ministers and to compel the legislature's acceptance of new cabinets. Publicly and with impunity, he also used the old boy network to bypass the government and communicate directly with high officials. Only when Kekkonen's term ended did governments remain stable throughout the entire period between elections.

Nevertheless, during Kekkonen's presidency, a few parties were represented in most governments — mainly the Centrists, Social Democrats, and Swedish People's Party — while the People's Democrats and Communists were often in government from 1966 onwards.

Throughout his time as president, Kekkonen did his best to keep political adversaries in check, while strongly dividing opinions in one direction and another. The Centre Party's rival National Coalition Party was kept in opposition for 20 years despite good election performances. The Rural Party (which had broken away from the Centre Party) was treated similarly. On a few occasions, parliament was dissolved for no other reason than that its political composition did not please Kekkonen. Despite his career in the Centre Party, his relation to the party was often difficult. He was a proponent of the so-called K-policy (K-linja) named after himself, Ahti Karjalainen and Arvo Korsimo. It promoted friendly relations and bilateral trade with the Soviet Union. Kekkonen consolidated his power within the party by placing supporters of the K-linja in leading roles. Various Centre Party members to whose prominence Kekkonen objected often found themselves sidelined, as Kekkonen negotiated directly with the lower level. Chairman of the Centre Party, Johannes Virolainen, was threatened by Kekkonen with the dissolution of parliament when Kekkonen wanted to nominate SDP's Sorsa instead of Virolainen as Prime Minister. Kekkonen's so-called "Mill Letters" were a continuous stream of directives to high officials, politicians, and journalists. Yet Kekkonen by no means always used coercive measures. Some prominent politicians, most notably Tuure Junnila (NCP) and Veikko Vennamo (Rural Party), were able to brand themselves as "anti-Kekkonen" without automatically suffering his displeasure as a consequence.

==== First term (1956–1962) ====
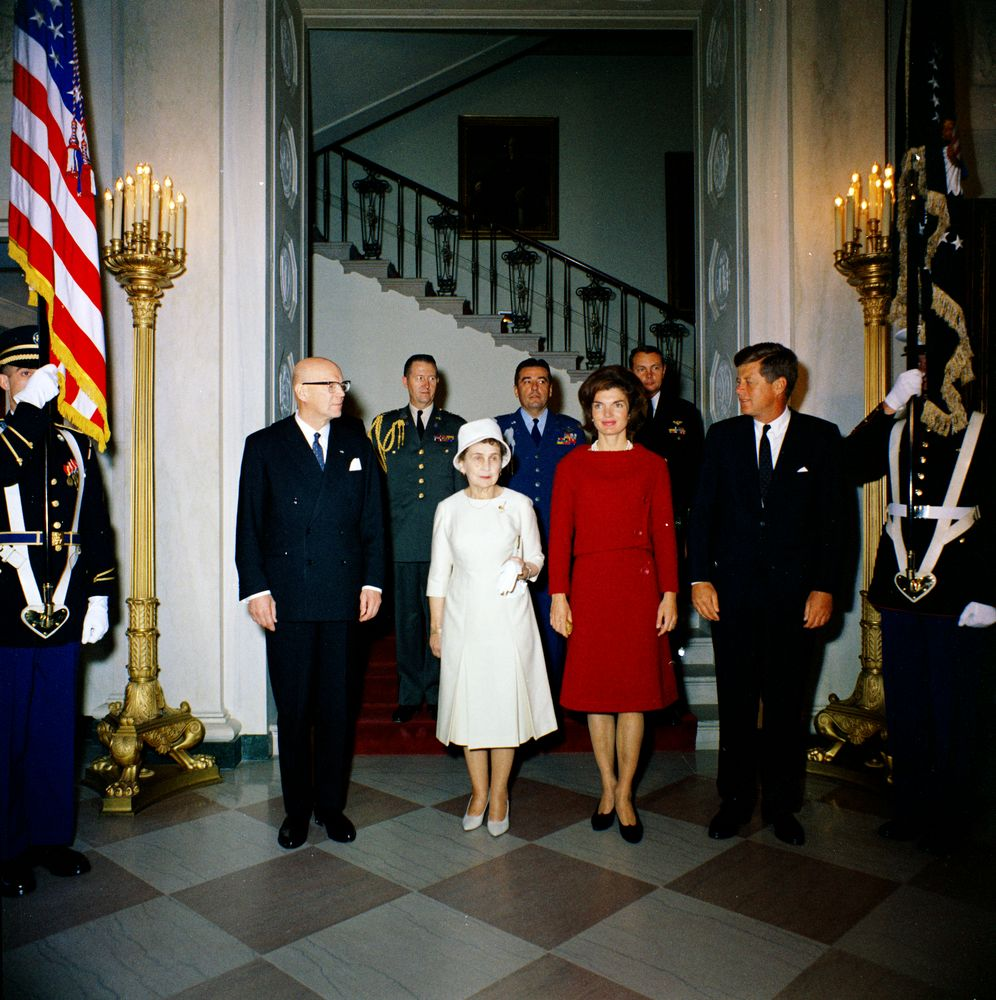
Kekkonen's visit to the United States in 1961 and first time in the White House. Left: Urho Kekkonen, Sylvi Kekkonen, Jacqueline Kennedy, and John F. Kennedy.

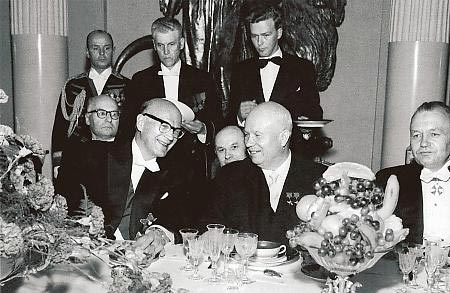
Soviet leader Nikita Khrushchev attended Kekkonen's 60th birthday party in Presidential Palace, Helsinki. The party continued until 5 a.m. at the Tamminiemi residence.

In the presidential election of 1956, Kekkonen defeated the Social Democrat Karl-August Fagerholm 151–149 in the electoral college vote. The campaign was notably vicious, with many personal attacks against several candidates, especially Kekkonen. The tabloid gossip newspaper Sensaatio-Uutiset accused Kekkonen of fistfighting, excessive drinking and extramarital affairs. The drinking and womanizing charges were partly true. At times, during evening parties with his friends, Kekkonen got drunk, and he had at least two longtime mistresses.

As president, Kekkonen continued the neutrality policy of President Paasikivi, which came to be known as the Paasikivi–Kekkonen line. From the beginning, he ruled with the assumption that he alone was acceptable to the Soviet Union as Finnish President. Evidence from defectors like Oleg Gordievsky and files from the Soviet archives show that keeping Kekkonen in power was indeed the main objective of the Soviet Union in its relations with Finland.

In August 1958, Karl-August Fagerholm's third cabinet, a coalition government led by the Social Democratic Party (SDP) and including Kekkonen's party Agrarian League, was formed. The Communist front SKDL was left out. This irritated the Soviet Union because of the inclusion of ministers from SDP's anti-Communist wing, namely Väinö Leskinen and Olavi Lindblom. They were seen by the Soviet Union as puppets of the anti-Communist SDP chair Väinö Tanner, who had been convicted in the war-responsibility trials. Kekkonen had warned against this but was ignored by SDP. The Night Frost Crisis, as coined by Nikita Khrushchev, led to Soviet pressure against Finland in economic matters. Kekkonen sided with the Soviet Union, working behind the scenes against the cabinet; Fagerholm's cabinet consequently resigned in December 1958. The Finnish Foreign Ministry ignored United States offers for help as promised by Ambassador John D. Hickerson in November 1958. The crisis was resolved by Kekkonen in January 1959, when he privately travelled to Moscow to negotiate with Khrushchev and Andrei Gromyko. The crisis established Kekkonen as having the extra-constitutional authority to determine which parties may participate in government, effectively restricting the free parliamentary formation of governing coalitions for many years ahead.

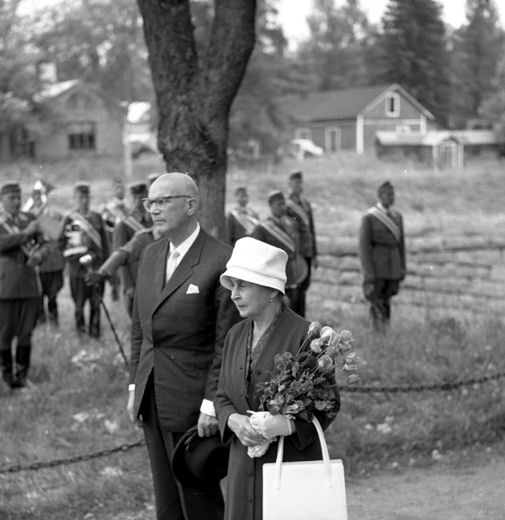
President Kekkonen and his wife Sylvi in Mälkiä, Lappeenranta, in 1961

The second time the Soviets helped Kekkonen was in the Note Crisis in 1961. The most widely held view of the Note Crisis is that the Soviet Union acted to ensure Kekkonen's reelection. Whether Kekkonen himself had organized the incident and to what extent remains debated. Several parties competing against Kekkonen had formed an alliance, Honka-liitto, to promote Chancellor of Justice Olavi Honka, a non-partisan candidate, in the 1962 presidential elections. Kekkonen had planned to foil the Honka-liitto by calling an early parliamentary election and thus forcing his opponents to campaign against each other and together simultaneously. However, in October 1961, the Soviet Union sent a diplomatic note proposing military "consultations" as provided by the Finno-Soviet Treaty. As a result, Honka dropped his candidacy, leaving Kekkonen with a clear majority of 199 out of 300 electors in the 1962 elections. In addition to support from his own party, Kekkonen received the backing of the Swedish People's Party and the Finnish People's Party, a small classical liberal party. Furthermore, the conservative National Coalition Party quietly supported Kekkonen, although they had no official presidential candidate after Honka's withdrawal. Following the Note Crisis, genuine opposition to Kekkonen disappeared, and he acquired an exceptionally strong—later even autocratic—status as the political leader of Finland.

Kekkonen's policies, especially towards the USSR, were criticised within his own party by Veikko Vennamo, who broke off his Centre Party affiliation when Kekkonen was elected president in 1956. In 1959, Vennamo founded the Finnish Rural Party, the forerunner of the nationalist True Finns.

==== Second term (1962–1968) ====
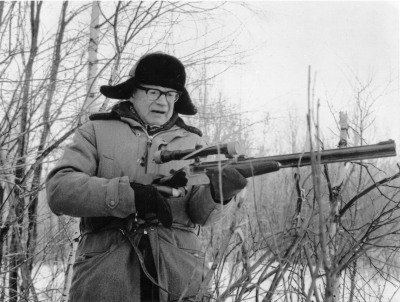
Kekkonen hunting with a rifle in Zavidovo, Soviet Union, in 1965

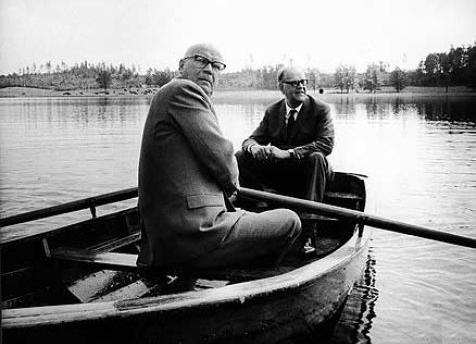
Kekkonen with the Prime Minister of Sweden Tage Erlander in a rowing boat in Harpsund, Sweden, in 1967

Kekkonen was re-elected for a second term in 1962. Mostly in the 1960s, Kekkonen was responsible for a number of foreign-policy initiatives, including the Nordic nuclear-free zone proposal, a border agreement with Norway, and a 1969 Conference on Security and Cooperation in Europe. The purpose of these initiatives was to avoid the enforcement of the military articles in the Finno-Soviet Treaty which called for military co-operation with the Soviet Union. Kekkonen thereby hoped to strengthen Finland's moves toward a policy of neutrality. Following the invasion of Czechoslovakia in 1968, pressure for neutrality increased. Kekkonen informed the Soviet Union in 1970 that if it was no longer prepared to recognise Finland's neutrality, he would not continue as president, nor would the Finno-Soviet Treaty be extended.

==== Third term (1968–1978) ====
Kekkonen was re-elected for a third term in 1968. That year, he was supported by five political parties: the Centre Party, the Social Democrats, the Social Democratic Union of Workers and Smallholders and the Finnish People's Democratic League, and the Swedish People's Party. He received 201 votes in the electoral college, whereas the National Coalition party's candidate finished second with 66 votes. Vennamo came third with 33 votes. Although Kekkonen was re-elected with two-thirds of the vote, he was so displeased with his opponents and their behaviour that he publicly refused to stand for the presidency again. Vennamo's bold and constant criticisms of his presidency and policies especially infuriated Kekkonen, who labelled him a "cheat" and "demagogue".

Initially, Kekkonen had intended to retire at the end of this term, and the Centre Party already began to prepare for his succession by Ahti Karjalainen. However, Kekkonen began to see Karjalainen as a rival instead, and eventually rejected the idea.

==== Term extension (1973) ====
Exceptive law
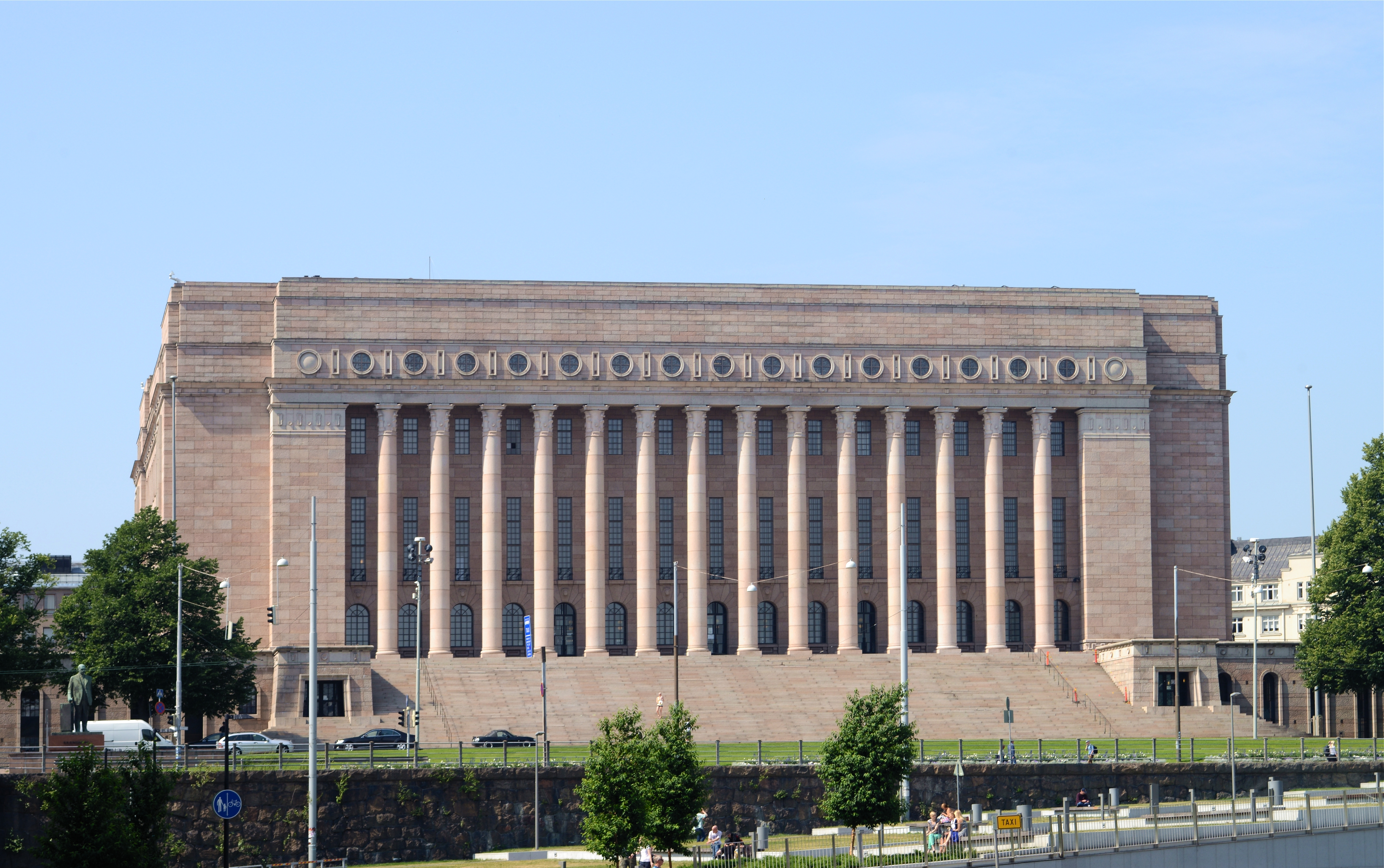

Parliament of Finland
- Long title: Act extending the current term of office of the President of the Republic
- Citation: Säädöskokoelma 232/1973
- Signed by: Prime Minister Kalevi Sorsa in the absence of the President of the Republic

Legislative history
- Bill citation: HE 247/1972
- Third reading: 18 January 1973
- Voting summary: 170 voted for; 28 voted against; 1 abstained

Related legislation
- Constitution of Finland
- Status: Expired

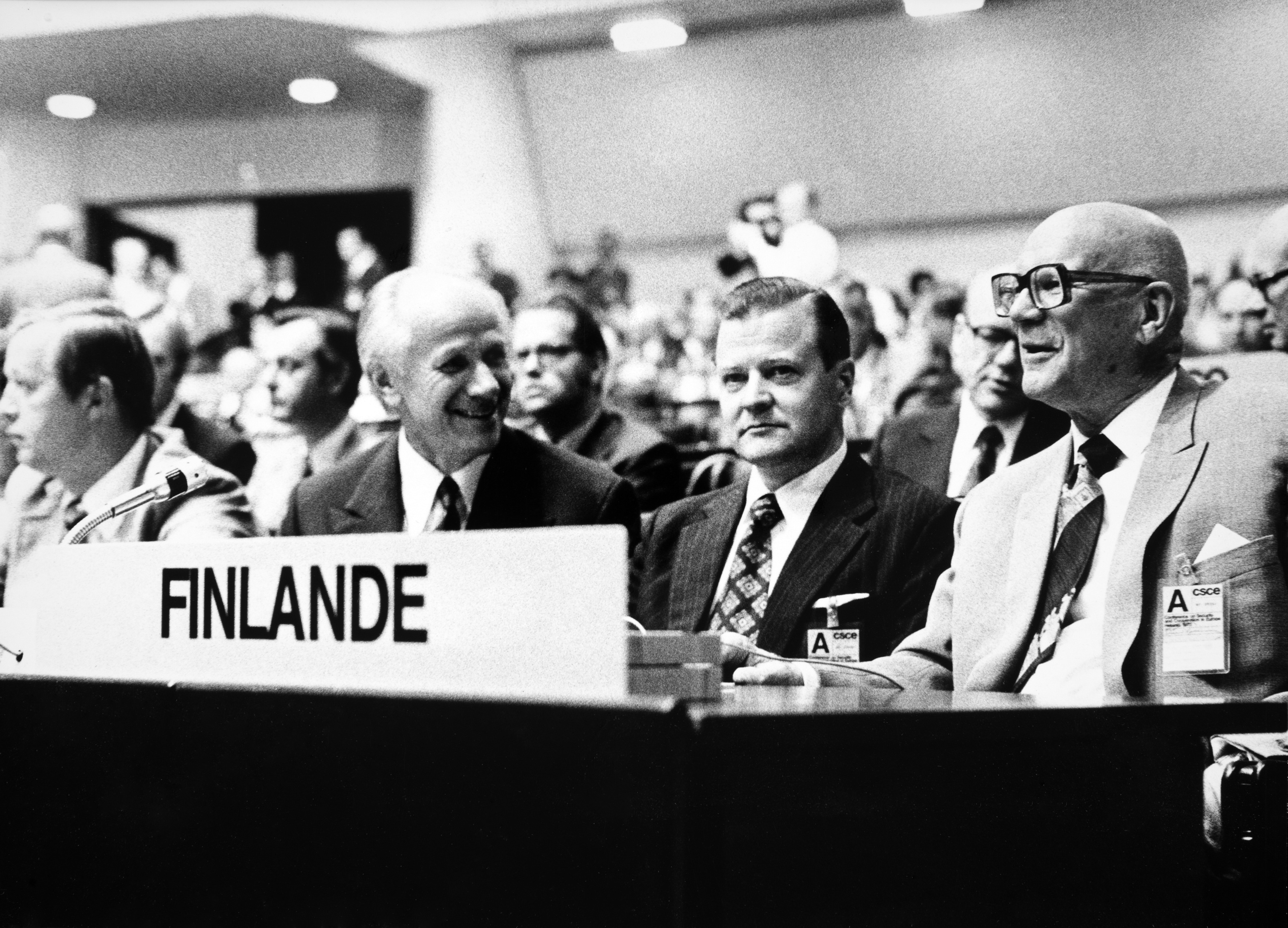
Conference on Security and Cooperation in Europe (OSCE) was held in 1975, Helsinki. President Urho Kekkonen (right).

On 18 January 1973, the Finnish Parliament extended Kekkonen's presidential term by four years with a Derogation law, which made a temporary ad hoc exception to the constitution. By this time, Kekkonen had secured the backing of most political parties, but the major right-wing National Coalition Party, which Kekkonen had opposed, was still skeptical and stood in the way of the required 5/6 majority. Concurrently, Finland was negotiating a free-trade agreement with the EEC, a deal that was seen as vital by Finnish industry, as the United Kingdom, an important buyer of Finnish exports, had left the European Free Trade Association to become a member of the EEC. Kekkonen implied that only he personally could satisfy the Soviet Union that the deal would not threaten Soviet interests. The tactic secured National Coalition support for the term extension.

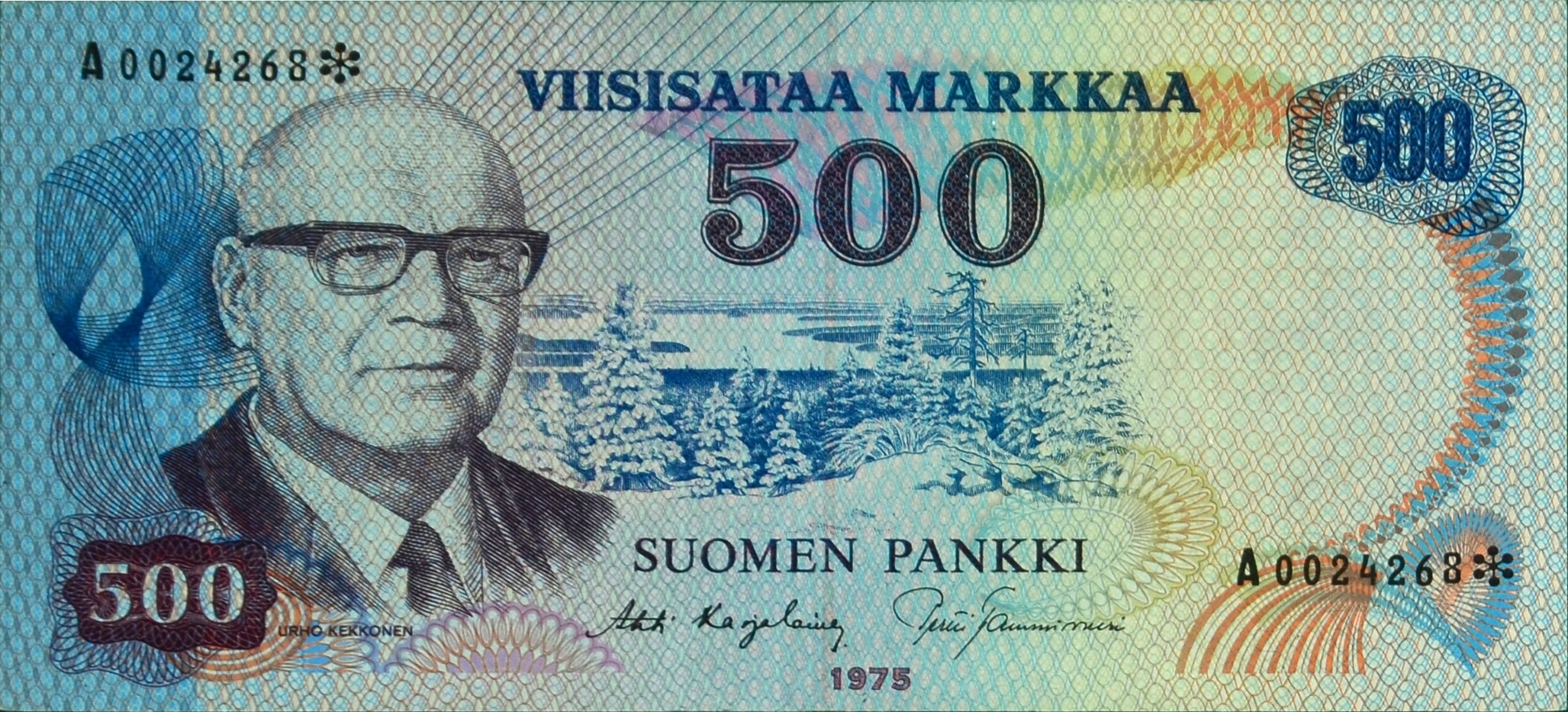
Mk.500 banknote featuring Kekkonen, issued 1975

The elimination of any significant opposition and competition meant he became Finland's de facto political autocrat. His power reached its zenith in 1975 when he dissolved parliament and hosted the Conference on Security and Co-operation in Europe (CSCE) in Helsinki with the assistance of a caretaker government.

==== Fourth term (1978–1982) ====
After nine political parties supported Kekkonen's candidacy in the 1978 presidential election, including the Social Democratic, Centre and National Coalition parties, no serious rivals remained. He humiliated his opponents by not appearing in televised presidential debates and went on to win 259 out of the 300 electoral college votes, with his nearest rival, Raino Westerholm of the Christian Union, receiving only 25.

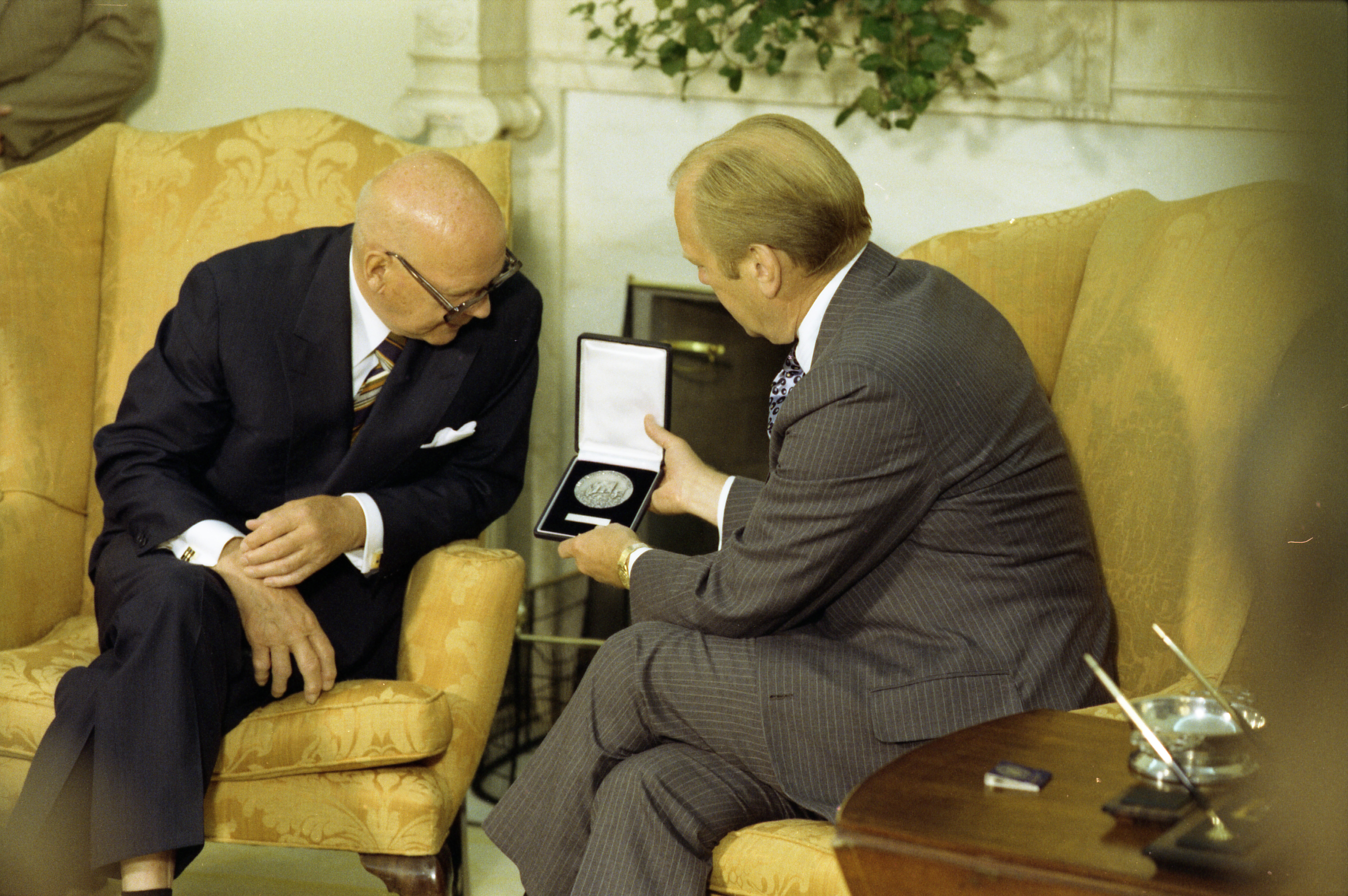
Gerald R. Ford and Urho Kekkonen in the Oval Office in 1976

According to Finnish historians and political journalists, there were at least three reasons why Kekkonen clung on to the Presidency. First, he did not believe that any of his successor candidates would manage Finland's Soviet foreign policy well enough. Second, until at least the summer of 1978, he considered there was room for improvement in Finnish-Soviet relations and that his experience was vital to the process. This is exemplified by the use of his diplomatic skills to reject the Soviet Defence Minister Dmitriy Ustinov's offer to arrange a joint Soviet-Finnish military exercise.

Third, he believed that by working for as long as possible he would remain healthy and live longer. Kekkonen's most severe critics, such as Veikko Vennamo, claimed that he remained President so long mainly because he and his closest associates were power-hungry. In 1980 Kekkonen was awarded the Lenin Peace Prize.

=== Later life and death ===
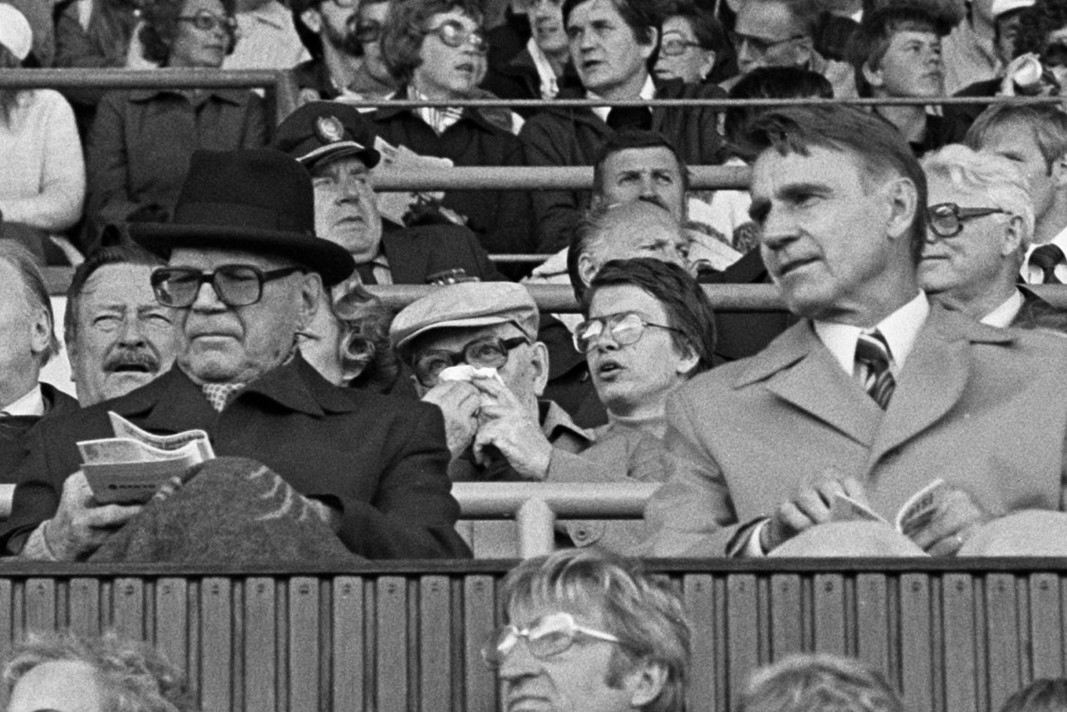
President Urho Kekkonen and Prime Minister Mauno Koivisto watching Finland-Sweden international tournament at Helsinki Olympic Stadium (1980)

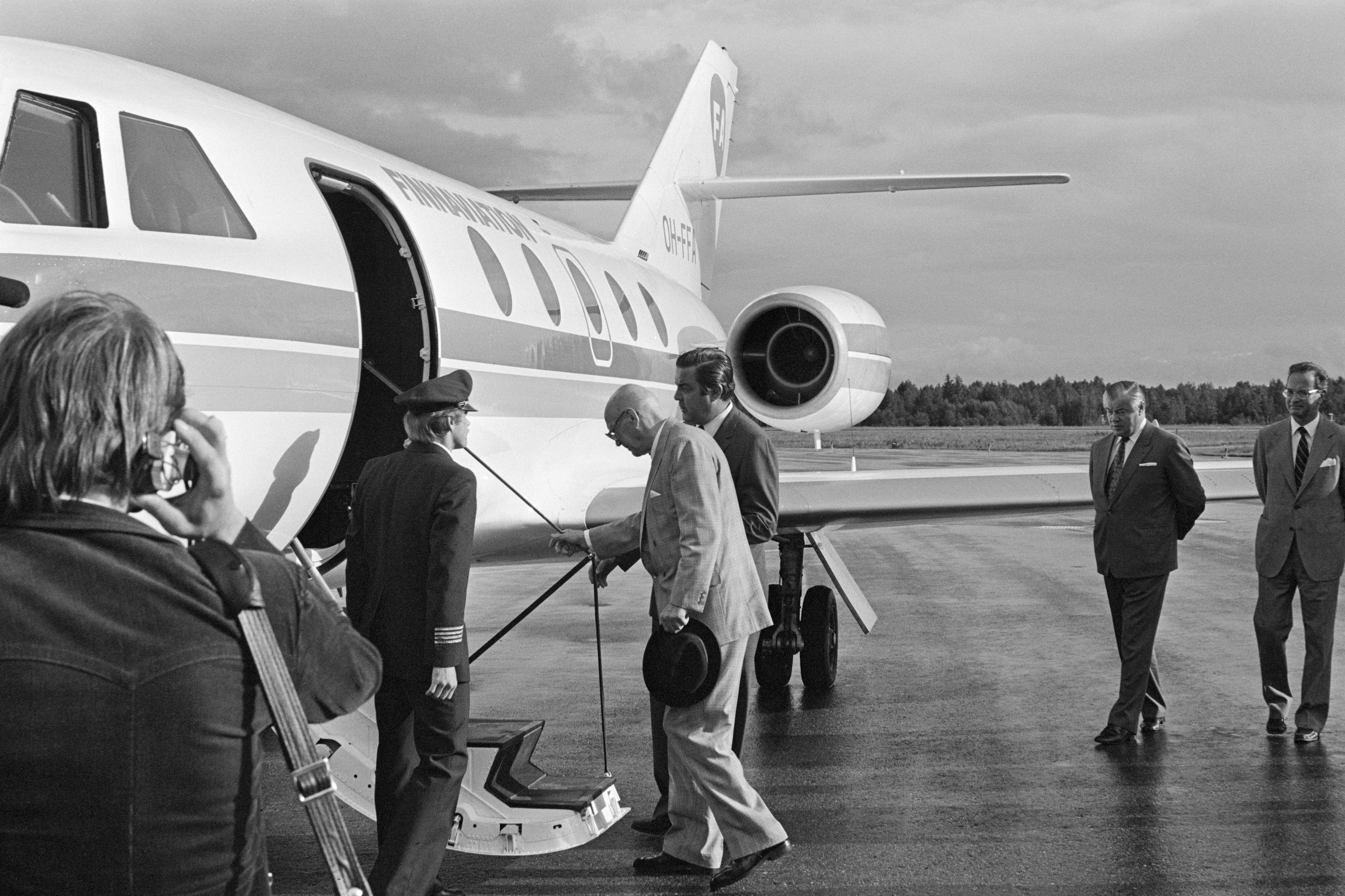
Urho Kekkonen's last state visit was to Iceland in 1981.

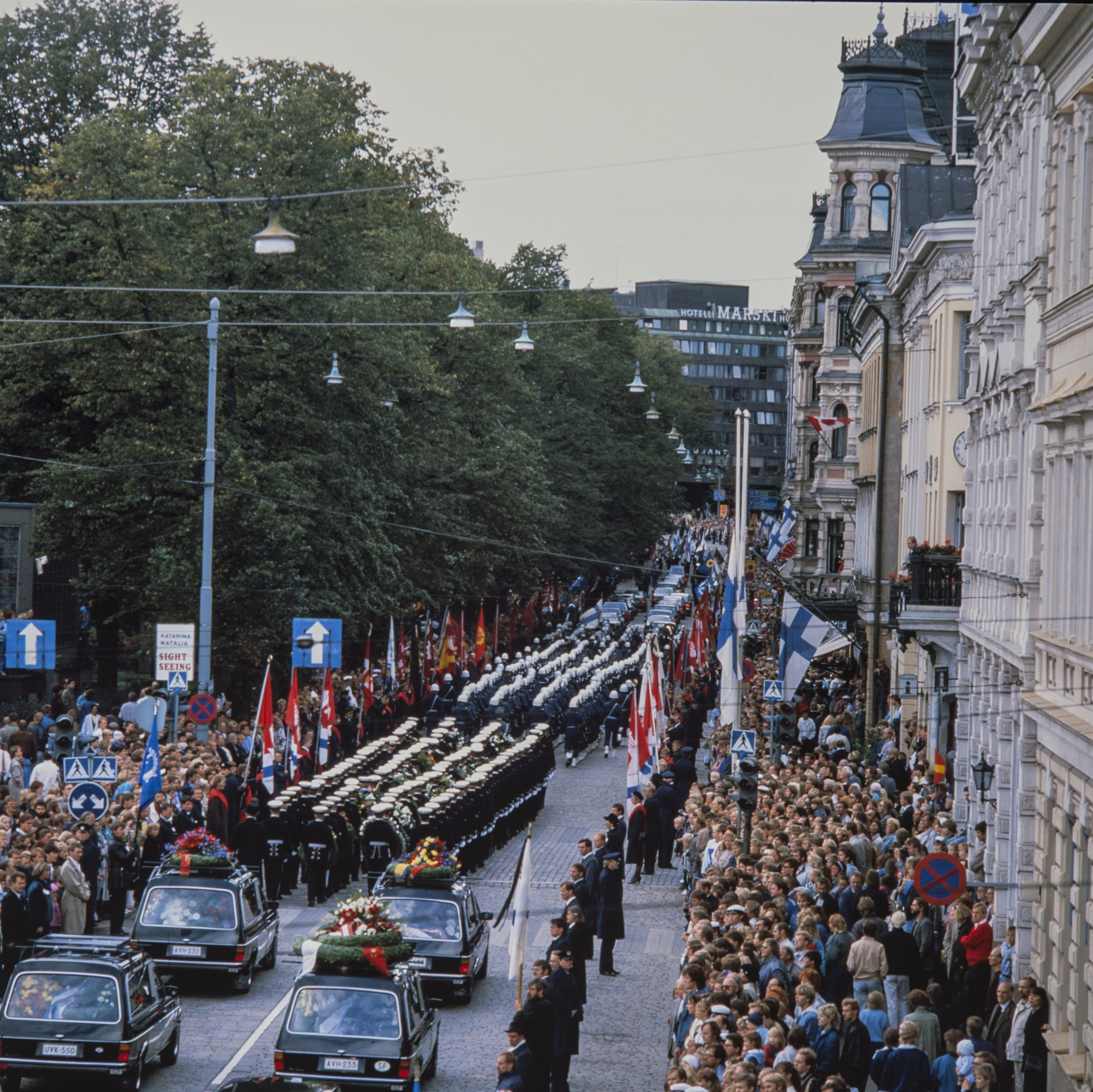
Funeral cortege of Urho Kekkonen in Helsinki, 1986

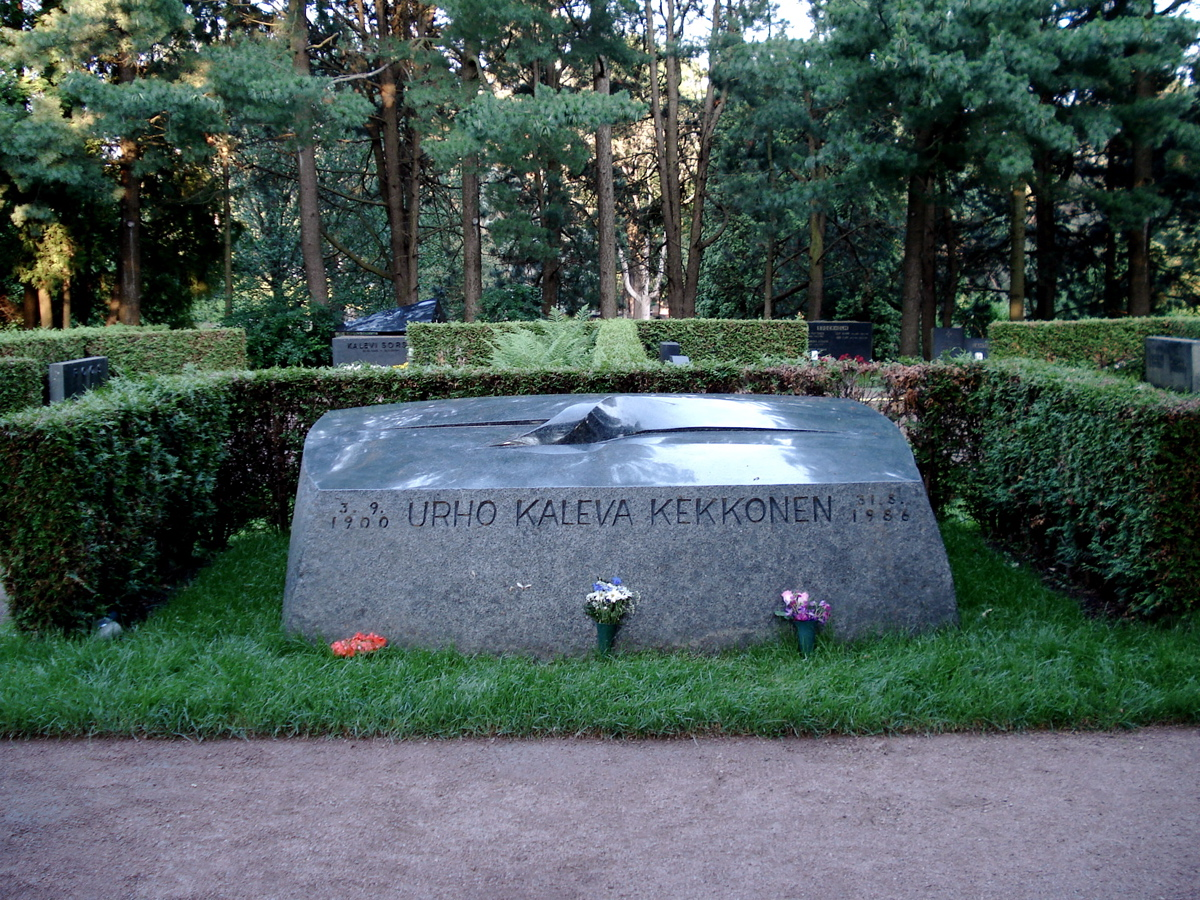
Grave of Urho Kekkonen at the Hietaniemi Cemetery in Helsinki

From December 1980 onwards, Kekkonen suffered from an undisclosed disease that appeared to affect his brain functions, sometimes leading to delusional thoughts. He had begun to suffer occasional brief memory lapses as early as the autumn of 1972; they became more frequent during the late 1970s. Around the same time, Kekkonen's eyesight deteriorated so much that for his last few years in office, all of his official papers had to be typed in block letters. Kekkonen had also suffered from a failing sense of balance since the mid-1970s and from enlargement of his prostate gland since 1974. He was also subject to occasional violent headaches and suffered from diabetes from the autumn of 1979. Rumors about his declining health had begun to circulate in the mid to late 1970s, but the press attempted to silence these rumors to respect the president's privacy.

According to biographer Juhani Suomi, Kekkonen gave no thought to resigning until his physical condition began to deteriorate in July 1981. The 80-year-old president then began to seriously consider resigning, most likely in early 1982. Prime Minister Mauno Koivisto finally dealt a defeat to Kekkonen in 1981. In April, Koivisto did what no one else had dared to during Kekkonen's presidency by stating that under the constitution, the prime minister and cabinet were responsible to Parliament, not to the President. Kekkonen asked Koivisto to resign, but he refused. This is generally seen as the death knell of the Kekkonen era; Kekkonen, who felt that he had lost a significant amount of his authority, never fully recovered from the shock caused by this event.

Historians and journalists debate the precise meaning of this dispute. According to Seppo Zetterberg, Allan Tiitta, and Pekka Hyvärinen, Kekkonen wanted to force Koivisto to resign to decrease his chances of succeeding him as president. In contrast, Juhani Suomi believed the dispute involved scheming between Koivisto and rival prospective presidential candidates. Kekkonen at times criticised Koivisto for making political decisions too slowly and for his vacillation, especially for speaking too unclearly and philosophically.

Kekkonen became ill in August during a fishing trip to Iceland. He went on medical leave on 10 September, before finally resigning due to ill health on 26 October 1981. There is no report available about his illness, as the papers have been moved to an unknown location, but it is commonly believed that he suffered from vascular dementia, probably due to atherosclerosis.

Kekkonen withdrew from politics during his final years. He died at Tamminiemi on 31 August 1986, three days before his 86th birthday, and was buried with full honours. His heirs restricted access to his diaries and later an "authorised" biography by Juhani Suomi was commissioned, the author subsequently defending the interpretation of the history therein and denigrating most other interpretations. Critics have questioned the value of this work; the historian Hannu Rautkallio considered the biography little else than a "commercial project" designed for selling books rather than aiming for historical accuracy.

== Legacy ==
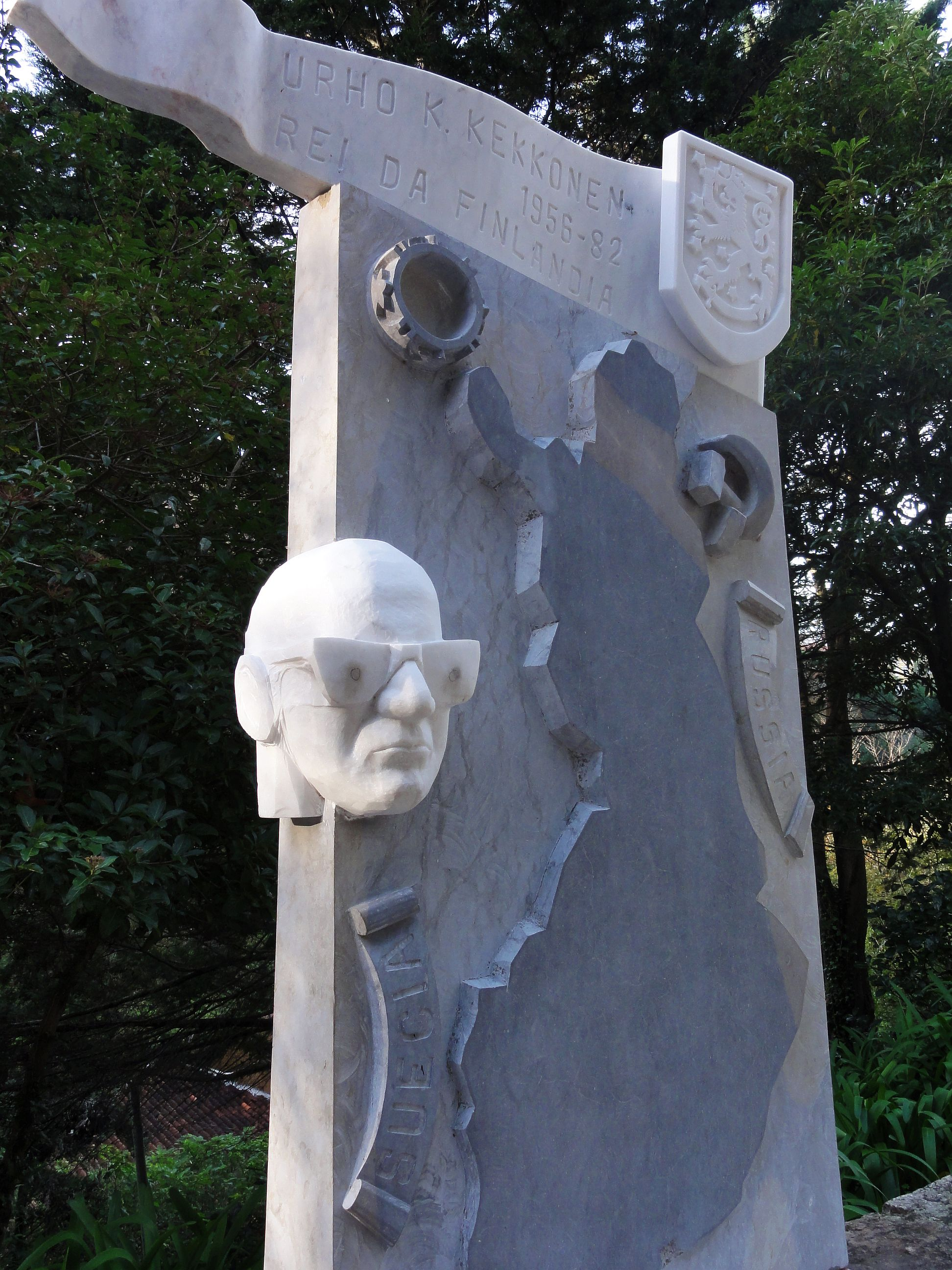
Statue of Urho Kekkonen in Sintra, Portugal, made by Auli Korhonen, titled "The King of Finland"

Some of Kekkonen's actions remain controversial in modern Finland, and disputes continue about how to interpret many of his policies and actions. He often used what was termed the "Moscow card" when his authority was threatened, but he was not the only Finnish politician with close relations to Soviet representatives. Kekkonen's authoritarian behavior during his presidential term was one of the main reasons for the reforms of the Finnish Constitution in 1984–2003. Under these, the powers of Parliament and the prime minister were increased at the expense of presidential power. Several of the changes were initiated by Kekkonen's successors.

- Presidential tenure was limited to two consecutive terms.
- The President's role in cabinet formation was restricted.
- The President was to be elected directly, not by an electoral college.
- The President could no longer dissolve Parliament without the support of the Prime Minister.
- The Prime Minister's role in shaping the foreign relations of Finland was enhanced.

Although controversial, his policy of neutrality allowed trade with both the Communist and Western blocs. The bilateral trade policy with the Soviet Union was lucrative for many Finnish businesses. His term saw a period of high sustained economic growth and increasing integration with the West. He negotiated entrance into EFTA and thus was an early beginner for Finnish participation in European integration, which later culminated in full membership in the EU and the euro. He remained highly popular during his term, even though such a profile approached that of a cult of personality towards the end of his term. He is still popular among many of his contemporaries, particularly in his own Centre Party.

== Cabinets ==
- Kekkonen I Cabinet
- Kekkonen II Cabinet
- Kekkonen III Cabinet
- Kekkonen IV Cabinet
- Kekkonen V Cabinet

== Tributes ==
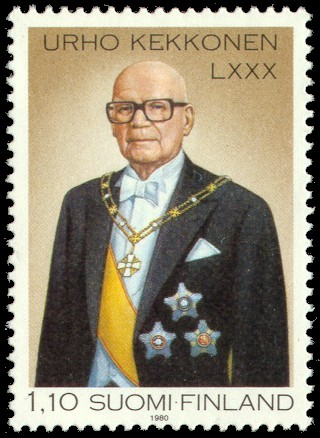
Kekkonen on a Finnish stamp, issued in 1980

- The Urho Kekkonen National Park, Finland's second largest national park, is named after Kekkonen.
- The Urho Kekkonen museum was opened in Tamminiemi in 1987.
- In Helsinki, the former Kampinkatu (Kamppi Street) was renamed Urho Kekkosen katu in Finnish and Urho Kekkonens gata in Swedish (Urho Kekkonen Street) in 1980.
- In Tampere, the Paasikivi–Kekkonen Road (Paasikiven–Kekkosentie) is named after both Kekkonen and J. K. Paasikivi.
- Such was his impact on the Finnish political scene that Kekkonen appeared on the Mk.500 banknote during his term as president. The series of Finnish Markka banknotes used at this time was the second-to-last design series in the entire history of the currency. It is a rare example of a living non-royal head of state being depicted on currency. This banknote was declared Finland's most beautiful note according to voting organised by the commemorative coins and medal marketer Suomen Moneta on 1 April 2011.
- To date, President Kekkonen is the only Finnish person to have a collector coin issued in his honour during his lifetime.
  - 25 years of presidency (Silver jubilee) of U. K. Kekkonen. The silver collector's coin that pays homage to Kekkonen was issued in 1981 when he had served 25 years as the president. The coin also commemorated Kekkonen's 80th birthday the previous year. Designed by sculptor Nina Terno, the symbolic reverse side of the coin depicts a ploughman with a pair of horses pulling a harrow. In 2010, the Mint of Finland is re-released coins minted in 1981 from its vaults.
  - President U. K. Kekkonen 75th Birthday. The silver coin was issued on Kekkonen's birthday on 3 September 1975 to commemorate the president's 75th birthday. Designed by sculptor Heikki Häiväoja, the reverse side depicts four tall pine trees that symbolise the first four terms of President Kekkonen.
- Posti Group (formerly Suomen Posti in Finnish) has issued four President Kekkonen commemorative postage stamps.
  - Name: 60th birthday of President Urho Kekkonen, issued: 3 September 1960, designed by Olavi Vepsäläinen
  - Name: 70th birthday of President Kekkonen, issued: 3 September 1970, designed by Eeva Oivo
  - Name: 80th birthday of President Kekkonen, issued: 3 September 1980, designed by Eeva Oivo
  - Name: President Kekkonen's mourning stamp, issued: 30 September 1986, designed by Eeva Oivo
- A monument to Urho Kekkonen and Alexei Kosygin was erected in Kostomuksha, Russia in 2013.

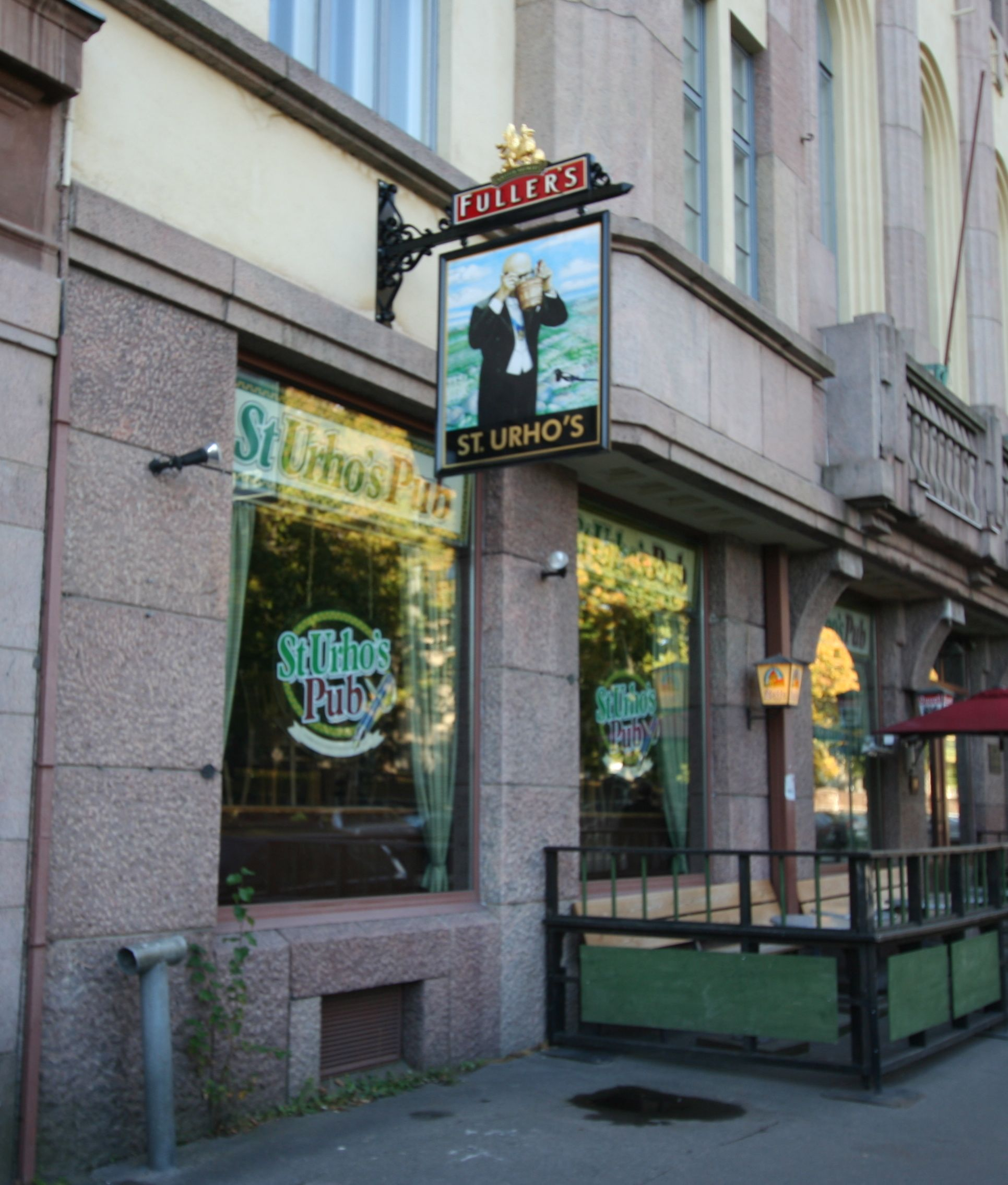
St. Urho's Pub in Etu-Töölö

- A pub in Etu-Töölö, Helsinki was named St. Urho's Pub in honour of Kekkonen being a regular patron.

== In popular culture ==
=== Film and television ===
- The vote count from the 1978 elections was broadcast on the radio, and has been shown numerous times in television documentaries. The monotonous reading out of the votes, in groups of five, is still well-recognised in Finnish popular culture, and broadly quoted and paraphrased; "Kekkonen, Kekkonen, Kekkonen, Kekkonen, Kekkonen."
- A portrait of Kekkonen is stolen by the protagonist of the 1988 Aki Kaurismäki film Ariel. A Kekkonen portrait is also used in his 1987 film Hamlet Goes Business.
- In the 1987 thriller film Farewell, Mr. President, directed by Matti Kassila, one of the most important characters is the president of Finland (played by Tarmo Manni) who has very similar look to Kekkonen, but who is not referred to by name.
- A Finnish movie, Kekkonen tulee! (Kekkonen Is Coming!), set in the late 1970s, is about Kekkonen visiting a small village in Finland and how everyone is excited.
- A Vril Kekkonen is portrayed by Tero Kaukomaa in the movie Iron Sky: The Coming Race
- In the 2019 Finnish television series Shadow Lines (Nyrkki), Kekkonen appears as a character with J. K. Paasikivi. In the series Kekkonen is played by Janne Reinikainen.

=== Other media ===
- The North American Finnish invention Saint Urho, created in the 1950s, is likely named after Kekkonen.
- The name of the Finnish men's magazine, Urkki, was a reference to Urho Kekkonen.
- Matti Hagelberg uses a caricature of Kekkonen as the main character in his comic album with the same name.
- A likeness of Kekkonen in portrait is available as a placeable furniture item in the popular online game Habbo, which serves as an homage to him by the games' Finnish developers Sulake.
- Generative AI technology has been used to create videos on YouTube about a fictional television talk show called Kekkonen Talk Show, in which Kekkonen himself acts as the host, interviewing Irwin Goodman, Vladimir Putin and Adolf Hitler. Although the videos are made for entertainment purposes, the videos have also divided opinions and raised ethical questions about the use of deceased people, such as Kekkonen, with the help of artificial intelligence.

== See also ==
- List of presidents of Finland
- List of state visits made by President Urho Kekkonen of Finland
- Paasikivi–Kekkonen doctrine
- Georg C. Ehrnrooth

== Honours ==
Coat of Arms of Urho Kekkonen
- Armiger: Urho Kekkonen
- Adopted: 1956
- Motto: "Sitä kuusta kuuleminen" ("Listen to the tree, by the roots of which you live")

=== National honours ===
- Finland: Grand Cross of the Order of the White Rose
- Finland: Grand Cross of the Order of the Lion of Finland
- Finland: Grand Cross of the Order of the Cross of Liberty
- Finland: Grand Cross of the Order of the Holy Lamb

=== Foreign honours ===
- Sweden: Knight of the Order of the Seraphim
- Norway: Grand Cross of the Order of St. Olav
- Denmark: Knight of the Order of the Elephant
- Iceland: Grand Cross with Collar of the Order of the Falcon – His wife: Grand Cross
- Austria: Decoration of Honour for Services to the Republic of Austria
- United Kingdom: Grand Cross of the Order of the Bath (1969)
- Italy: Knight Grand Cross with Collar of the Order of Merit of the Italian Republic (1960)
- Spain: Knight of the Collar of the Order of Isabella the Catholic (1975)
- Spain: Knight of the Collar of the Order of Charles III (1978)
- Mexico: Collar of the Order of the Aztec Eagle (1963)
- Tunisia: Grand Cross of the Order of Independence (1965)
- Egypt: Collar of the Order of the Nile (1967)
- Holy See: Knight with the Collar of the Order of Pope Pius IX (1971)
- San Marino: Knight Grand Cross with Collar of the Order of San Marino (1971)
- Senegal: Grand Cross of the National Order of the Lion (1973)
- Colombia: Grand Cross of the Order of Boyaca (1980)

Former socialist states:

- People's Republic of Bulgaria: Order of the Balkan Mountains
- People's Republic of Poland: Order of the White Eagle
- Socialist Republic of Romania: Order of the Star of the Romanian Socialist Republic

Former (now-defunct) states:

- Czechoslovakia: Order of the White Lion (1969)
- Soviet Union: Order of Friendship of Peoples
- Soviet Union: Order of Lenin
- Yugoslavia: Great Star of the Order of the Yugoslav Star (1963)
- Iran: Empire of Iran: Grand Cross with Collar of the Order of Pahlavi (1970)
- Iran: Empire of Iran: Commemorative Medal of the 2500th Anniversary of the founding of the Persian Empire (14 October 1971).

== Notes ==
Political offices
Preceded by Karl-August Fagerholm	Speaker of the Parliament of Finland; 1948–1950	Succeeded by Karl-August Fagerholm
Preceded by Karl-August Fagerholm	Prime Minister of Finland; 1950–1953	Succeeded by Sakari Tuomioja
Preceded by Ralf Törngren	Prime Minister of Finland; 1954–1956	Succeeded by Karl-August Fagerholm
Preceded by Juho Kusti Paasikivi	President of Finland; 1956–1982	Succeeded by Mauno Koivisto
