= St. Urho's Pub =

Beer restaurant located at Museokatu 10 in Etu-Töölö, Helsinki, Finland

Coordinates: 60°10′26.58″N 24°55′53.66″E

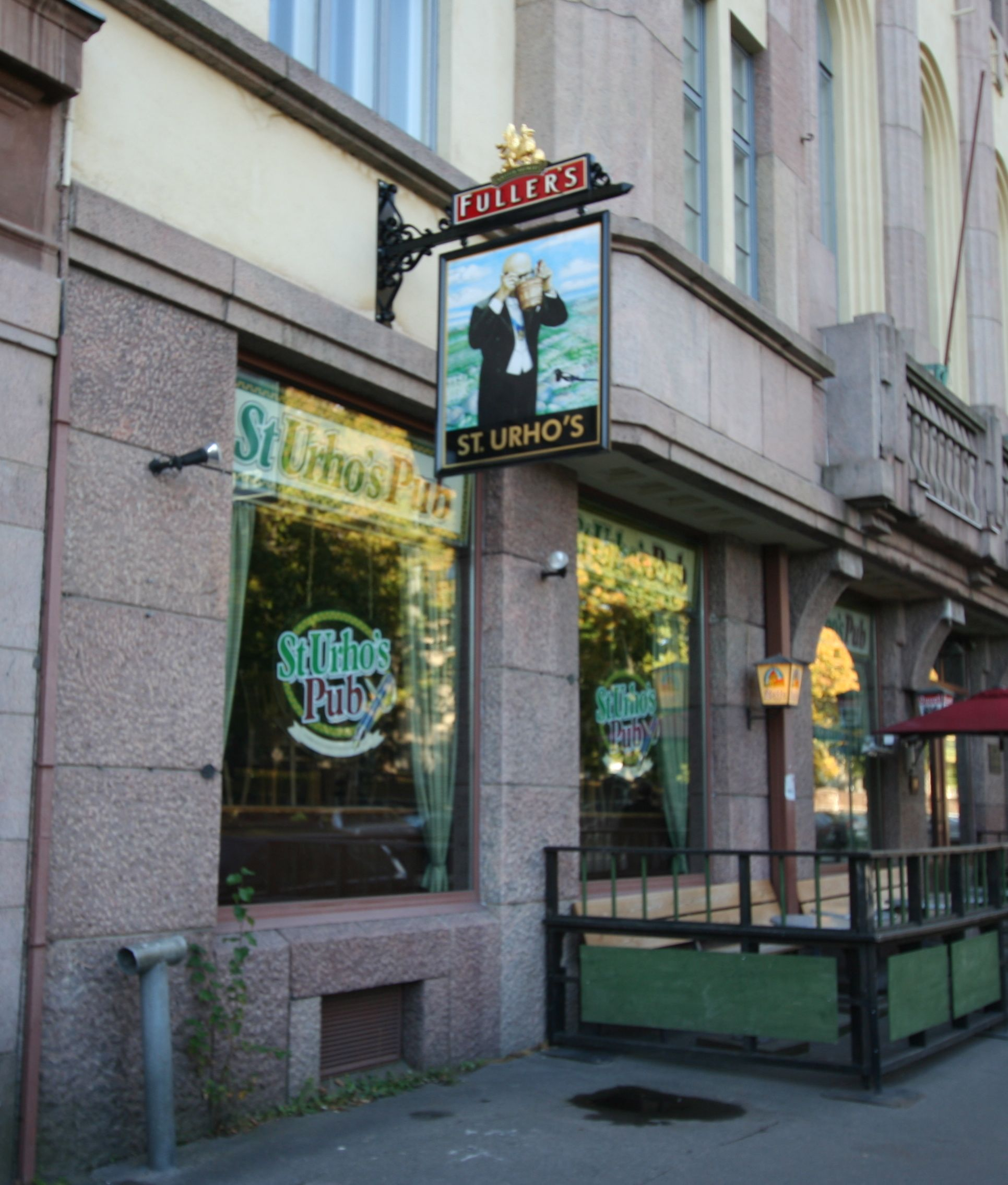
The main facade of the pub, with its sign showing Urho Kekkonen drinking sahti.

St. Urho's Pub is a beer restaurant located at Museokatu 10 in Etu-Töölö, Helsinki, Finland. The restaurant used to be a local favourite of former President of Finland Urho Kekkonen, which also led to its name. The restaurant was opened on 7 May 1973 with Urho Kekkonen attending the opening ceremony. The restaurant has become particularly known among artist musicians.

St. Urho's Pub was chosen as the Beer Restaurant of the Year in 2006.
