= Matti Kekkonen =

Finnish politician (1928–2013)

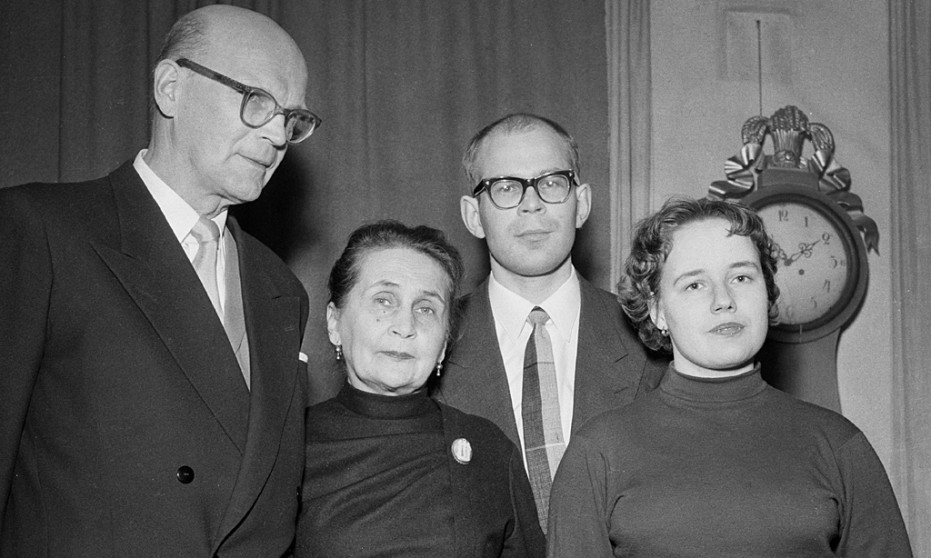
- Matti Kekkonen (in the middle) with his father, Urho, his mother, Sylvi and his wife, Marja.

Member of the Finnish Parliament
- In office 1958-1970

Personal details
- Born: Matti Kaleva Kekkonen; 4 September 1928 Helsinki, Finland
- Died: 3 July 2013 (aged 84) Helsinki, Finland
- Occupation: Politician, jurist
- Known for: His career in the Finnish parliament; son of Finnish president Urho Kekkonen

Matti Kaleva Kekkonen (4 September 1928 – 3 July 2013) was a Finnish politician and jurist, son of president Urho Kekkonen and author Sylvi Kekkonen.

Matti Kekkonen worked as a jurist in the 1950s and 1960s. In 1957, he received the title of varatuomari. From 1958 to 1970 he was a member of the Finnish Parliament. He was also a presidential elector in 1962 and 1968. After his 12-year career in the parliament, he worked in the Ministry of Agriculture and Forestry from 1970 to 1979.

His twin brother was diplomat and ambassador Taneli Kekkonen, who committed suicide on 11 July 1985, predeceasing his father by over a year.

== Personal life ==
Matti Kekkonen was married to music teacher Marja Linnala, daughter of composer Eino Linnala, from 1954 to 1973. Linnala released music textbooks and later two memoirs: Töölön tyttö (2003) and Kekkosten miniänä (2010). Kekkosten miniänä tells about her life as the wife of Matti Kekkonen and as the daughter-in-law of Urho and Sylvi Kekkonen.

From their marriage, Kekkonen and Linnala had one daughter, Salla (born 1957).

Kekkonen died in Helsinki at the age of 84 on 3 July 2013.
