= Jussi Kekkonen =

Finnish major and CEO (1910–1962)

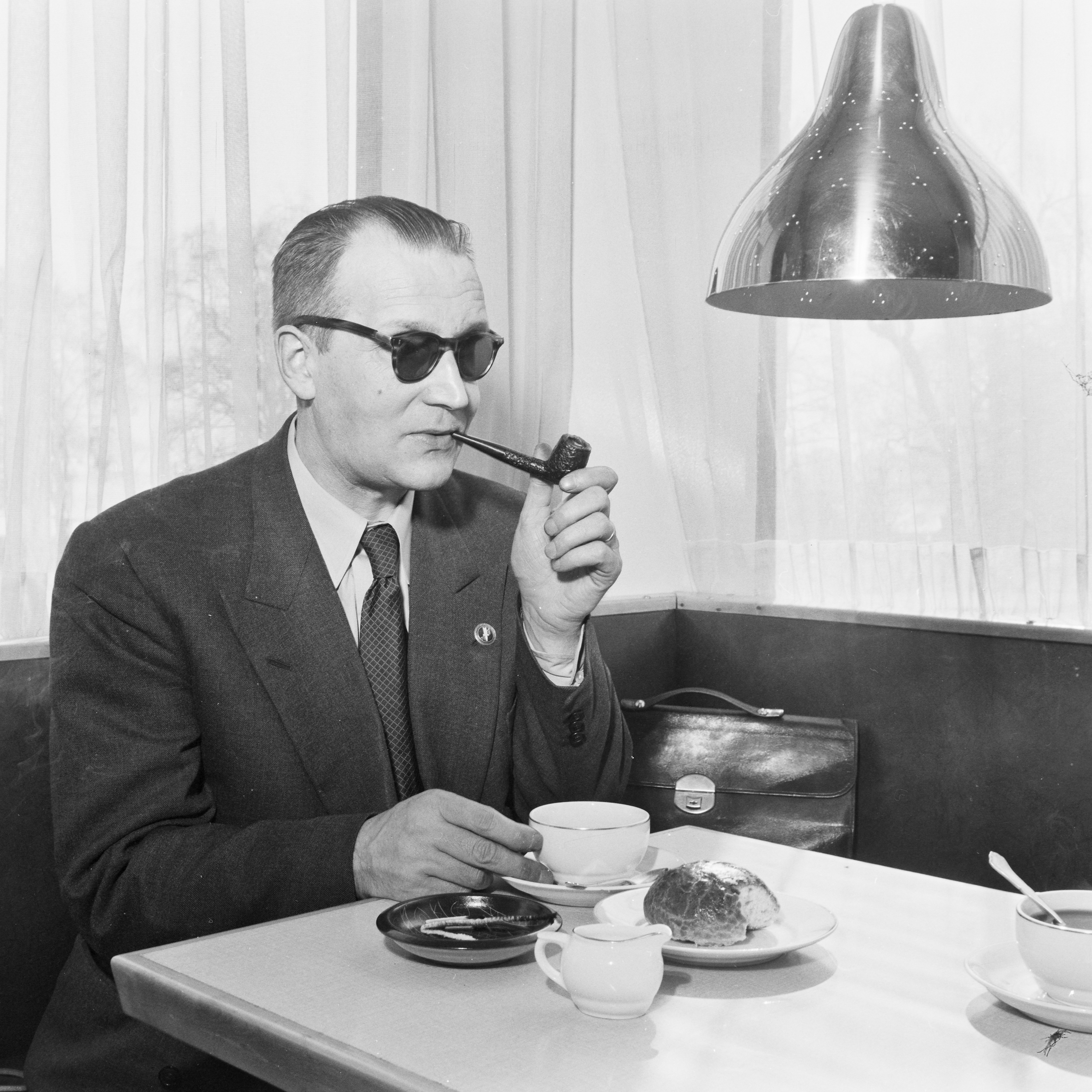
Jussi Kekkonen, Finnish military hero and younger brother of President of Finland Urho Kekkonen.

Uuno Johannes (Jussi) Kekkonen (30 September 1910 – 1 April 1962) was a Finnish major, CEO and the younger brother of President of Finland Urho Kekkonen. Jussi Kekkonen fought successfully in the Winter War in the direction of Kuhmo but lost his sight when he was wounded in the early stages of the Continuation War.

Kekkonen was born in Iisalmi as the son of Juho Kekkonen. He attended the Cadet School in the early 1930s and served as an officer in the Kuhmo border squad. Kekkonen was seen as a devoted and folk-like officer.

== In the Winter War ==
In October 1939, a Separate Battalion 14 (Erillinen Pataljoona 14) was founded at the command site of the Kuhmo border squad at the Jämäs barracks, under the command of Lieutenant Colonel Frans Ilomäki. Lieutenant Jussi Kekkonen served as the leader of the second squad of the battalion. When the Winter War started, Kekkonen's squad was doing fortification work in Kalliojoki. The enemy, outnumbering the Finns, attacked the Finnish troops numbering about 50 at Lammasperä, and Kekkonen's squad was sent there as reinforcements. The Finns were already giving up their positions at Vääräjoki when Kekkonen assembled his troops in the counter-attack starting on 6 December 1939. The Vääräjoki positions were re-manned and the Russians withdrew behind Vääräjoki. The front guards were now located at Vääräjoki and the proper defense station at Tyrävaara. The Russians' new attack on 12 December brought them to the open fields at Tyrävaara.

The group under Kekkonen's command, consisting of 270 men, attacked the Russians fortified in the Ranta house and the Kupsunen accommodation premises on Christmas Eve 1939. After a few hours of combat, the Russians started to withdraw towards the border, settling into position at Hukkajärvi near the Kiekinniemi house. With a group of 150 men, Kekkonen destroyed the remains of the Russian battalion still left at Kiekinniemi on 28 December, when the Russians were withdrawing across the border.

Kekkonen's group concentrated on securing the Kiekinkoski area from January to March 1940. The group also participated in military intelligence and disturbance missions on the Rasti-Saunajärvi-Riihivaara road.

== In the Continuation War ==
Promoted to Captain when the Continuation War started in summer 1941, Jussi Kekkonen served as the leader of the Kuhmo border squad at Rukajärvi. The Miinoa group (Osasto Miinoa) under Kekkonen's command moved across the border and conquered the villages of Miinoa and Luvajärvi with minor losses. The next target was the village of Kiimasjärvi where the Russians were known to be in position. Kekkonen started to move there with three groups and two machine guns. Near the village, the attackers ran into fortified Russian positions and failed to conquer the village. The Russians struck at the group's back and the group had to withdraw. The withdrawal became a retreat and the group disassembled when Kekkonen was severely wounded in a Russian ambush. Kekkonen and his envoy were found at a campfire when the terrain was being searched in the evening and Kekkonen was soon transported by aeroplane from Luvajärvi to the Kuhmo field hospital. Having been wounded in the eyes, Kekkonen's sight was beyond rescue.

Lieutenant Taskinen, succeeding Kekkonen as the leader of the border squad, moved the squad to positions along a river west of the Luvajärvi village. After one week, the Lieksa border squad led by Captain Seitamo arrived. The attack at Kiimasjärvi was resumed, but attempts at conquering the heavily fortified village failed, until the Russians left the village themselves, being threatened from the back by Finnish troops on the Rukajärvi road. Before the Russians left the village, they set fire to it.

== After the war ==
After being wounded, Kekkonen lost his sight permanently. He was promoted to Major, and after the war he served as a manager in the shipping company of Ragnar Nordström in Loviisa. Jussi Kekkonen died in Loviisa and was buried in a military hero grave in Kajaani.

== Sources ==
- Did Kekkonen have brothers and sisters? Turun Sanomat 5 March 2005
- Battles of Kuhmo in the Winter War
- Antti Tuuri: Rukajärven tie. Otava 1990, ISBN 951-1-11060-8, pp. 97–116.
- Erkki Aho's Finnish history blog 2 March 2009: Jussi Kekkonen, the President's brother
