= Juho Kekkonen (forester) =

Finnish forester and tenant farmer (1873–1928)

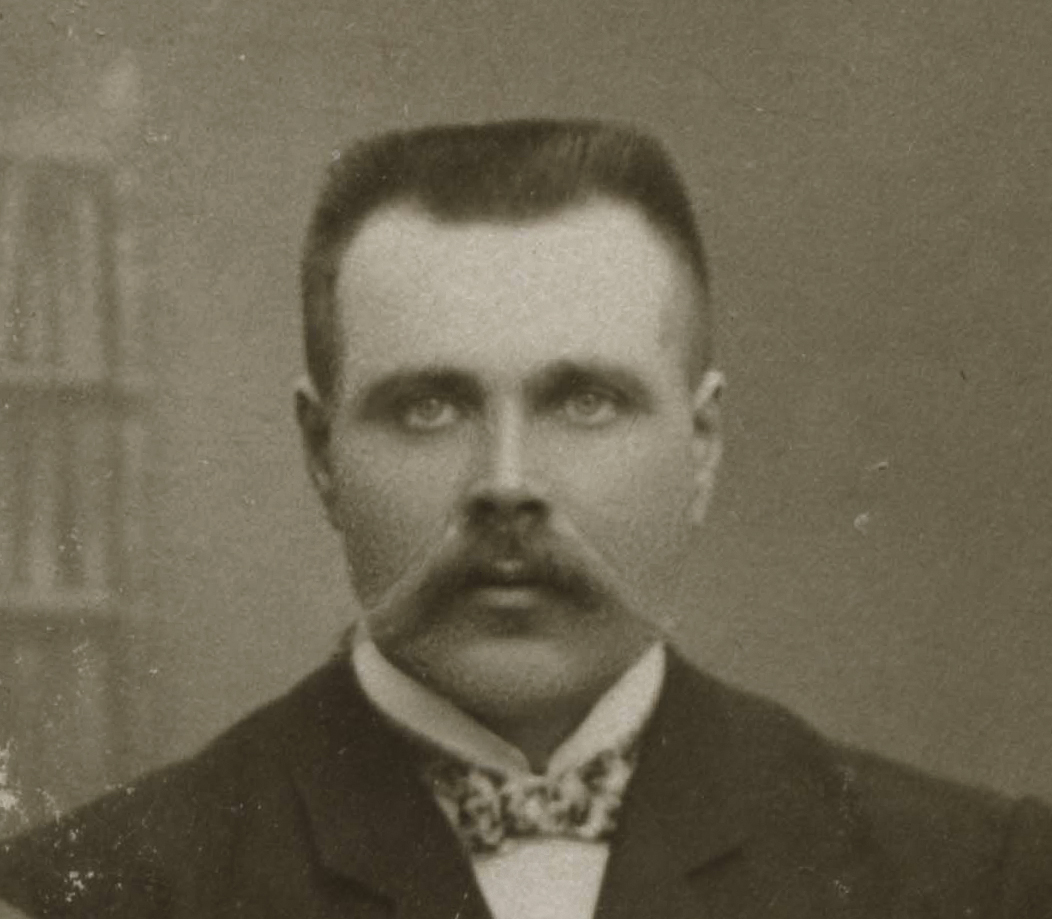
- Juho Kekkonen before 1910
- Born: 16 October 1873; Karttula, Grand Duchy of Finland
- Died: 11 December 1928 (aged 55); Kajaani, Finland
- Occupations: Forestry manager; logging caretaker; tenant farmer
- Spouse: Emilia Pylvänäinen (m. 1899)
- Children: 3, including Urho and Jussi

Juho Kekkonen (16 October 1873 – 11 December 1928) was Finnish head of forestry, logging caretaker and tenant farmer. He was also known as the father of Urho Kekkonen, the 8th President of Finland.

== Biography ==
Kekkonen was born in Northern Savo, in the then Karttula municipality, in the area of the present-day Tervo municipality. He spent his childhood with his parents Eenokki (1841–1909) and Anna-Liisa (1835–1909) and his two brothers Taavetti (1865–1902) and Alpertti (1875–1902) on the Kuivaniemi croft, which had been in the family's possession since the 18th century. However, Juho Kekkonen had to start working in the forest as a boy to earn a living. Juho, who had learned to read and write, had a good head for calculations.

In his twenties, Juho ended up at a logging site in Kangasniemi in Southern Savo, where he met his future wife, Emilia Pylvänäinen (1880–1957); Emilia's job was to drive the cattle to the Haahkala lands in the mornings, to pasture by the lake, and to pick them up at home in the evenings, in connection with which Emilia came to get to know Juho, who was traveling in the same area with groups of loggers. Juho and Emilia married in 1899, and after that, the young couple moved to Otava, near Mikkeli, when Juho Kekkonen had found work at the local Halla Oy's sawmill.

Juho Kekkonen become a forestry foreman, and the couple moved to Pielavesi. In July 1900, the Lepikko croft was purchased as their new home, which Juho Kekkonen immediately began to renovate. In the summer of 1900, a stove was built into the house, so the cottage was no longer a smokehouse when the family's firstborn son, Urho Kaleva, was born on September 3, 1900. The Kekkonen family lived in Pielavesi for six years; during this time, the family also had a second child, a daughter, Siiri Emilia (1904–1969). Juho was away from home a lot due to his work and at home the responsibility of raising children fell on Emilia. At Christmas 1906, the Kekkonens moved to Kuopio to follow Juho Kekkonen's work. A couple of years later, the family moved to Lapinlahti and to Iisalmi, where the Kekkonens' third child, Jussi (1910–1962), was born. At the working sites, Juho maintained strict discipline, aiming for prompt completion of work until the end of the working day, but he had a reputation as an honest man and did not participate in the lumberjacks' card games, drink, or smoke.

In 1911, Juho Kekkonen got a job as a log salesman for Kajaani's Puutavara Osakeyhtiö, and the town became established as the family home. The family first lived in a one-room and kitchen apartment near the then Kajaani prison, but then they were able to move to a new residential building built by the company at Kalliokatu 7. At first, the Kekkonens had a one-room and kitchen apartment, but later they moved to the largest two-room and kitchen apartment in the house. Juho Kekkonen traveled around Kainuu for his work and often stayed for long periods of time on his trips. The older of the family's sons, Urho, also accompanied his father on rafting trips and to forestry work sites during school holidays. However, in the politically young Finn and independence-minded family, schooling was valued, and both boys were given the opportunity to study at the Kajaani Co-educational School.

Juho Kekkonen became paralyzed in the 1920s. After falling ill, he had a Laestadian spiritual awakening, which had a strong influence on his attitude to life; he began to be called "Preacher Kekkonen" because he had a habit of including quotations from the Bible in his everyday speech. Juho Kekkonen died in Kajaani after several years of illness at the age of only 55. He was buried in the Kajaani cemetery.

== Sources ==
=== Further reading ===
- Brantberg, Robert (2017). UKK – Koko elämä (in Finnish). A Bonnier Group Company. ISBN 978-952-321-226-8.
