= Eenokki Kekkonen =

Finnish farmworker (1841–1909)

Eenokki Juhonpoika Kekkonen (born 1 June 1841 in Karttula – died 15 July 1909 in Karttula) was a Finnish farmworker. He is known as the paternal grandfather of President of Finland Urho Kekkonen.

Eenokki Kekkonen belonged to the steadless population in Finland that had strongly grown in the 19th century. Kekkonen became familiar with many homes when he served as a farmworker at various houses in Karttula for a decade in his youth. Kekkonen was a travelling man, he had to keep moving to earn his living. Before Kekkonen got his own cabin and became a backstugusittare, he had served as a farmworker for three years at the priesthouse in Karttula and serve at various houses in Karttula. As well as his various jobs at farms, Kekkonen was also a skilled stone worker, which he had learned from his father Juho, who had worked for a short term at the Helsinki-Hämeenlinna railway in 1857. As a stone worker, Kekkonen could add further support for his family to his meager income. As a sort of memorial for posterity, Kekkonen left a "hole stone", a large boulder three metres tall and almost two metres wide, where he had cut holes for his sons.

In Karttula, Kekkonen married Anna-Liisa Koskinen, the daughter of Elias Koskinen. The couple had four sons: Taavetti, Johannes, Juho and Alpertti. For the most part of their life, Eenokki and Anna-Liisa lived with their sons in the village of Koivujärvi in Vainikkala, Korvenmökki. The house on whose lands the smoke cabin was, was already familiar to Eenokki, he had served there as a farmworker for several times. When Kekkonen, who was earning the income to support his family, became paralysed and lost his sight almost entirely, the couple was sent to the poorhouse in Karttula, where Anna-Liisa died in 1909 and Eenokki died half a year after her. Their grandson Urho Kekkonen was 9 years old at the time.

Urho Kekkonen has mentioned that his grandfather had a reputation of having been "a great medicine man - a clairvoyant and a folk healer, in other words a kind of a witch". According to tradition, Eenokki Kekkonen also used his healing skills on the horse of a neighbouring house after it had got a large wound in its stomach, by telling people to gather all the cobwebs from the stable walls, crumble them into a ball and press it against the bleeding wound, which cured the horse.
