= Otava (village) =

Major village in Mikkeli, Finland

Coordinates: 61°39′N 27°04′E

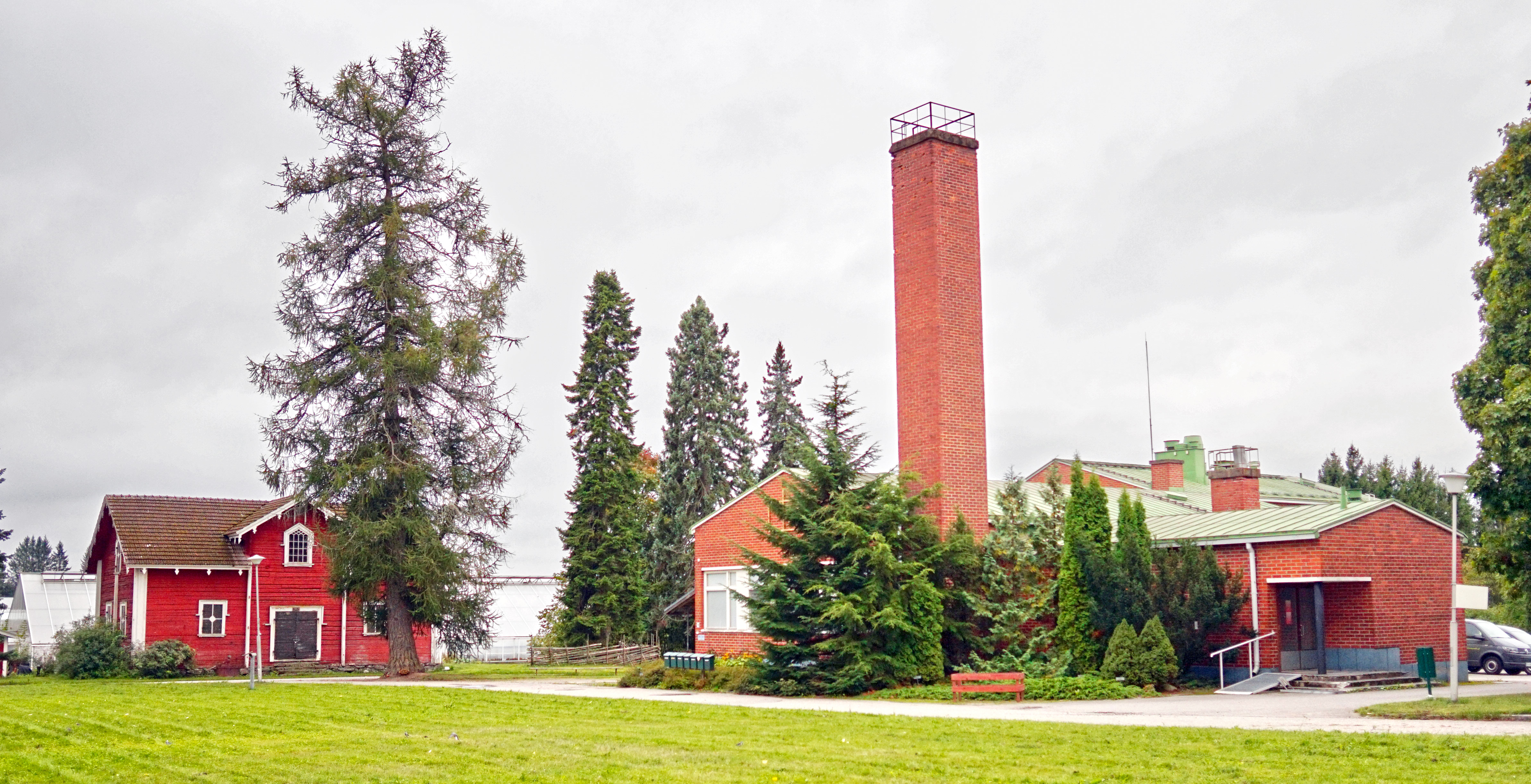
Otava

Otava is a major village in Mikkeli (until 2001 Mikkelin maalaiskunta), Eastern Finland. With a population of 2,000, it is the largest urban area in the surrounding areas of Mikkeli. In 1889, one of the main railways in Finland, the Savonia railway, and a sidetrack to Otava harbour were built through Otava, although trains do not stop there anymore. Also, highway 5 goes by the village.
