= Sylvi Kekkonen =

Finnish writer and First Lady of Finland from 1956 to 1974

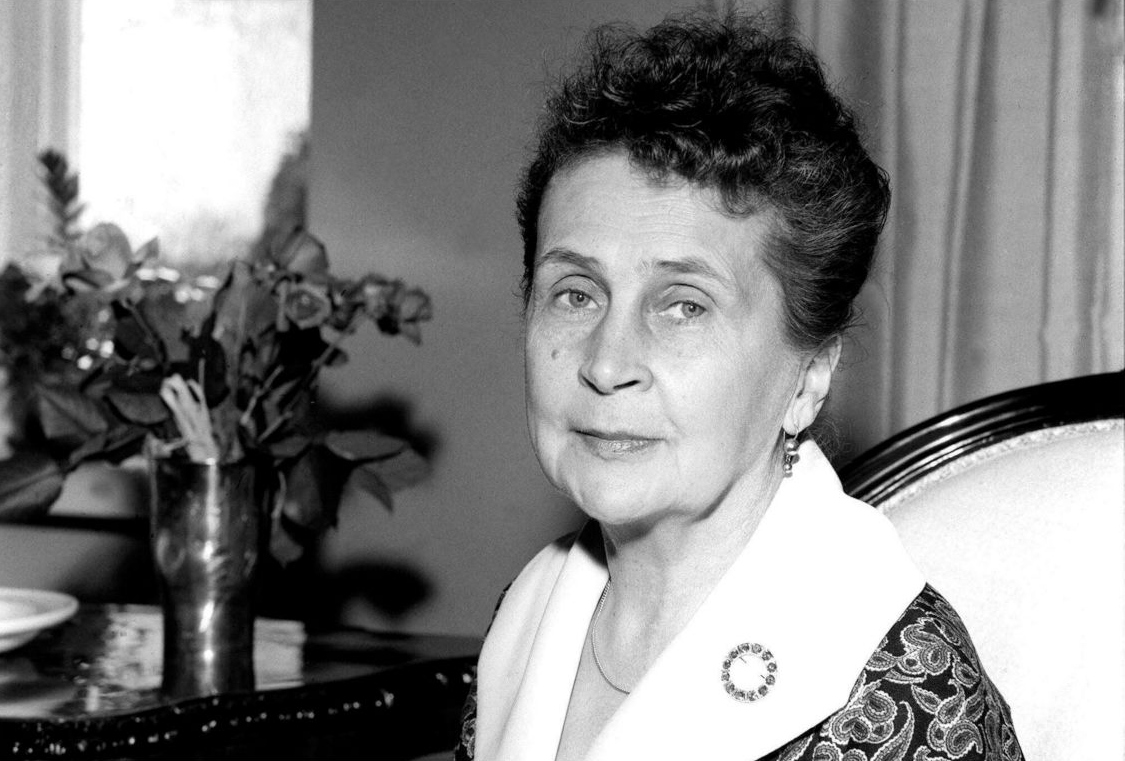
- Sylvi Kekkonen in 1961

First Lady of Finland
- In role 1 March 1956 – 2 December 1974
- President: Urho Kekkonen
- Preceded by: Alli Paasikivi
- Succeeded by: Tellervo Koivisto

Personal details
- Born: Sylvia Salome Uino; 12 March 1900 Pieksämäki, Grand Duchy of Finland, Russian Empire
- Died: 2 December 1974 (aged 74) Helsinki, Finland
- Spouse: Urho Kekkonen (m. 1926)
- Children: 2 (twins): Matti, Taneli
- Occupation: Writer

Sylvi Kekkonen (née Uino; 12 March 1900 – 2 December 1974) was a Finnish writer and the longest-serving First Lady of Finland.

== Personal life and family ==
Sylvi Uino was born to a middle-class family, as the fourth child of a chaplain (later vicar), Kauno Uino, and Emilia Salome née Stenberg.

After her father's death, the family moved to Mikkeli, where she went to school. She later moved to Helsinki with the intention of studying law, but dropped out and took a job instead.

In 1926, she married Urho Kekkonen; they had met while working at a central law enforcement agency Etsivä keskuspoliisi (now the Finnish Security Intelligence Service). Two years later, the couple had twin sons, Matti and Taneli.

She was a small and fragile person physically, but known for her strength of character.

She died at Meilahti Tower Hospital on 2 December 1974.

== First Lady of Finland ==
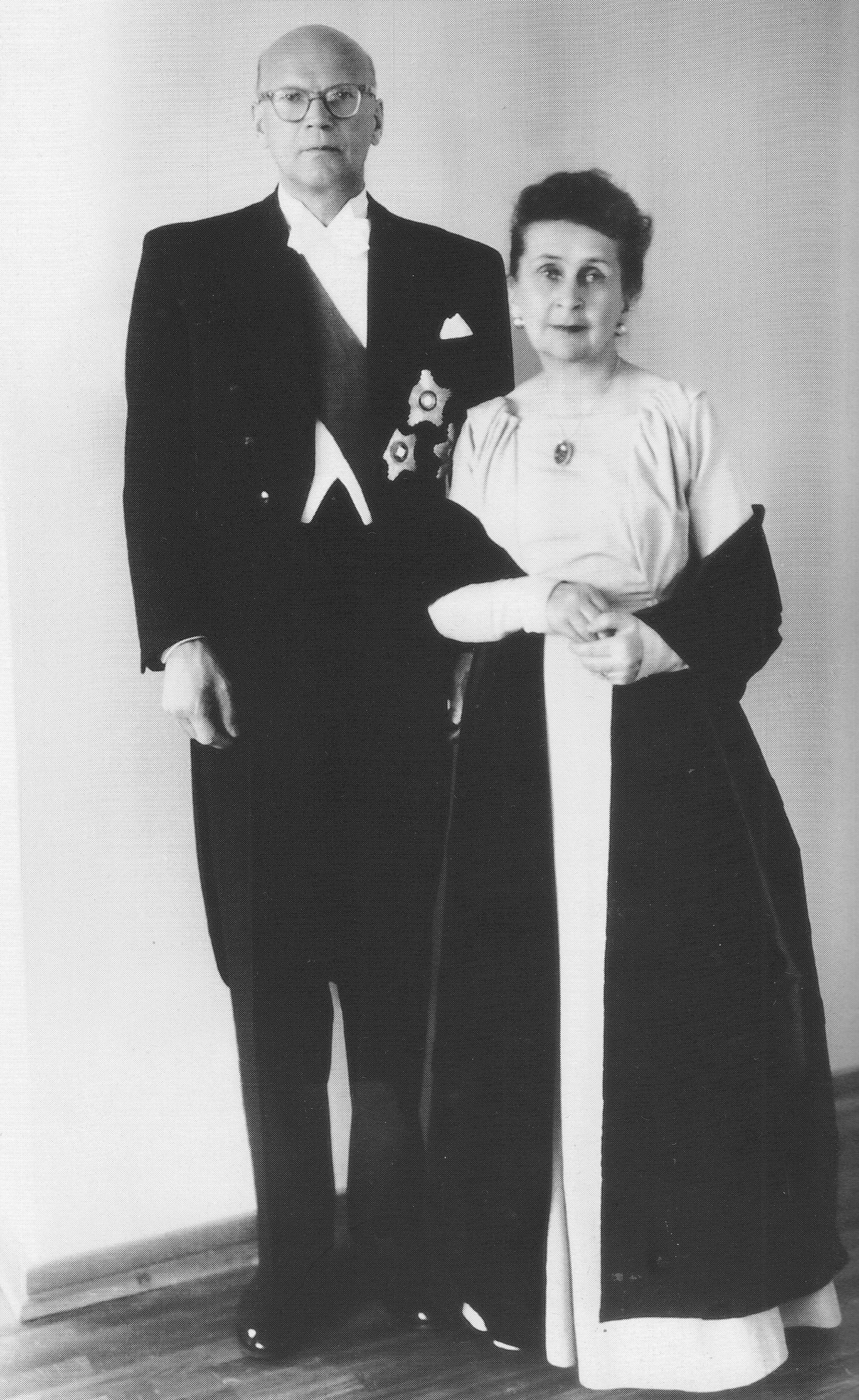
President and First Lady Kekkonen (1956)

Sylvi Kekkonen considered her main duty as the First Lady to support her husband, the President.

She was also active as a patron of various events and other initiatives, although in later life her health deteriorated and she was forced to cut down on her public appearances.

She is the longest-serving First Lady, with 18 years in the role, and is likely to remain so as the tenure of Presidents of Finland is now limited to a maximum of two consecutive six-year-terms.

== Writing career ==
Kekkonen's main literary output comprises two novels, Käytävä (1955) and Amalia (1958); and two short story collections, Kotikaivolla (1952) and the autobiographical Lankkuaidan suojassa (1968) which is considered to be her best in literary terms. Of these, Amalia was translated into eight languages.

Her writing often deals with impressionist themes and juvenile perspectives.

She also wrote essays; her debut publication, Kiteitä (1949), was an essay collection.

She is also known to have edited and critiqued many of her husband's writings.

To commemorate her, an annual literary symposium, Sylvi Symposiumi, has been held since 2000 in Pieksämäki, where there is also a park named after her.
