= Juho Kekkonen (politician) =

Finnish politician (1890–1951)

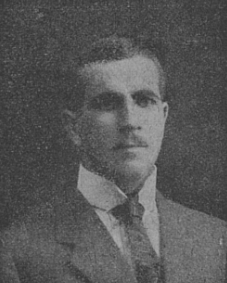
Juho V. Kekkonen in the 1910s

Juho Valerian Kekkonen (31 August 1890 in Heinolan maalaiskunta – 13 September 1951) was a Finnish schoolteacher and politician. He was a member of the Parliament of Finland from 1919 to 1922, representing the Christian Workers' Union of Finland (SKrTL).
