= Estonian punk =

Cultural movement

Estonian punk is a punk movement in Estonia, part of the international punk subculture.

== History ==
=== 1970s ===
Punk first developed in Estonia in the 1970s. Aleksander Müller, Irwin Art, Mihkel Pilve and Richard Nool were among the first Estonian punks. As punk as a subculture is ideologically against social norms, power and mass culture, the main target of the criticism of the Estonian punk was the Soviet order. Although youth rebellion was usually limited to defiant behavior and graffiti, there were also convinced anarchists and freedom fighters, such as Hillar Mardo, among the punks. The punks at that time were mostly of one generation, born in 1960–1965.

Due to the publication of beliefs, punks had a lot of problems. At the same time, punk was a way out for young people who were in trouble with the law or their parents. Basically, punks could be recognized by their far-reaching clothing. Punk was a revolt against a totalitarian state and a one-man mass culture. The driving force behind the punk was anarchism, the spread of which was hindered by the state and its established laws as factors restricting freedom.

Music was an important part of punk culture. In Estonia, punk rock - a style of music that grew out of rock 'n' roll - spread, dividing into several styles. In the West, punk jazz and punkabilly also existed. Punk music had simplicity. It was characterized by fast tempo (at least 140 beats per minute), strong amplification, a markedly aggressive playing style and sharp and straightforward lyrics.

Although many punks only listened to this music, a number of bands were born in the Estonian punk movement. Most of the punk bands were limited to a maximum of one concert in their hometown and then disappeared permanently, with few performing longer. As Tallinn was the capital and largest city of the Estonian SSR, most of the punk bands operated there.

In December 1979, the Tallinn punk band The Rebels was formed: Artur Poland - vocals, guitar; Ahto Moses - drums; Urmas Tangsoo - bass.

The band Cheese and the Tallinn 10th Secondary School band Sex Telegramm also appeared in Tallinn, where Toomas Pertelov, Jaak Männil and others played.

The Pära Trust - Jaak Arro, Veljo Vingissaar, Jüri Kermik and Hardi Volmer - emerged in the same year, the bands Kaseke and Singer Vinger, which developed later, have received opposite evaluations. Sometimes they have been considered important influences on Estonian punk. According to other sources, Pära Trust, Kaseke and Singer Vinger were not punk bands themselves, but inspired punk bands like Cheese.

=== 1980s ===
Along with perestroika, alternative movements became more active. Punks gathered in front of cafes in Tallinn. The youth could be detained by the militia in 1988, for clothing deemed "unsuitable" for a Soviet citizen, and there was also a risk of being beaten.

Later they gathered in gangs and spent time on the street together. There were fights with supporters of disco music or other opposing gangs. Ljubers, young people named after the Moscow suburb Lyubertsy and with a violent reputation, also visited Estonia once, but the fight did not stop. To evade the Soviet army, punks sometimes let themselves go crazy, pretending to be mentally disturbed. Various views spread: sexual freedom, pacifism and anarchism. The poles of the punk system of that time were anarchist philosophers and the lumpen proletariat.

Estonian punks of the time included Richard Nool, Mikk Pilv, Ülari Ollik, Villu Tamme, Tõnu Trubetsky, Anti Pathique (:et), Ivo Uukkivi, Merle Jääger and Siiri Sisask.

=== 1990s ===
In the 1990s, freedom of expression and activity came. Former cellar bands J.M.K.E. and Vennaskond performed on foreign tours. During the recession of 1993-1994 and its aftermath, café culture disappeared. New subcultures spread among young people.

=== 21st century ===
The punks of the old generation meet mainly at music events, and a new generation of punk has grown up. Today, punks oppose capitalism, Nazism and racist skinheads, among others. Since the 2000s, major punk music events have become popular in Estonia, such as a punk festival in Rakvere. The oldest and largest punk, ska and hardcore festival in Estonia is Punk'n'Roll, which has been taking place since 1998.

== See also ==
- List of Estonian punk bands
- Anti-fascism

== Bibliography ==
- Blackplait, Tony; Bloomfield, Cat (2009). Anarhia ENSV-s. Eesti punk. Tallinn: Varrak.
