= Arro (disambiguation) =

Arro is a commune on the island of Corsica, France,

Arro may refer to:

- Arró, a village in the municipality of Es Bòrdes (Val d'Aran), Catalonia
- Arro, Aínsa, a village in the Aínsa-Sobrarbe municipality, Aragon
- Arro, Champhai, a village in Mizoram, India
- Arro (surname), including a list of people with the name
