= Aaro =

Aaro is a Finnish given name. Notable people with the name include:

- Aaro Hellaakoski (1893–1952), Finnish poet
- Aaro Jaskari, Finnish politician
- Aaro Kauppi (1902–1979), Finnish jurist, farmer and politician
- Aaro Kiviperä, Finnish modern pentathlete
- Aaro Lintilä (1928–1986), Finnish farmer and politician
- Aaro Pajari (1897–1949), Finnish general
- Aaro Pakaslahti, Finnish diplomat
- Aaro Salo, Finnish politician
- Aaro Soiniemi (born 2005), Finnish footballer
- Aaro Stykki (1918–1975), Finnish construction foreman and politician
- Aaro Tiihonen (born 2005), Finnish footballer
- Aaro Toivonen (born 2005), Finnish footballer
- Aaro Vainio (born 1993), Finnish Formula Renault 2.0 Eurocup driver

== Fictional characters ==
- Aaro, character from the 2005 Finnsih film Shadow of the Eagle

== See also ==
- All-domain Anomaly Resolution Office (AARO) of the US Department of Defense
- Arro
