= Taneli Kekkonen =

Finnish diplomat (1928–1985)

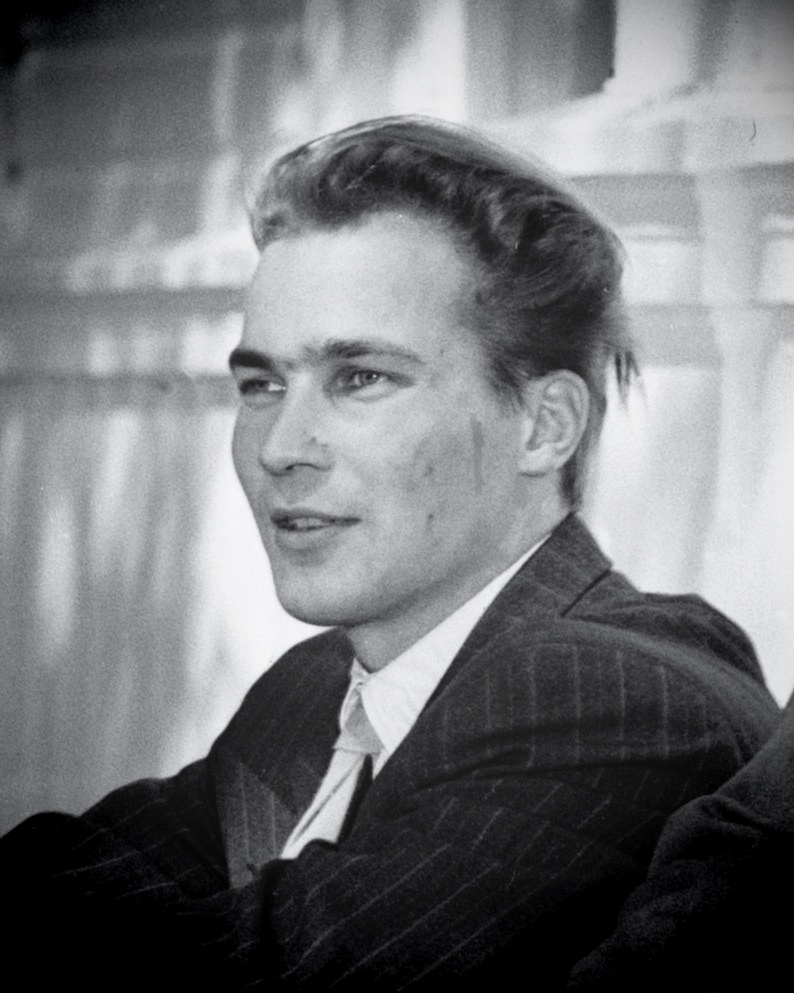
- Taneli Kekkonen in 1952

Finnish Ambassador to Israel
- In office 1984–1985
- Preceded by: Erkki Mäentakanen
- Succeeded by: Osmo Väinölä

Finnish Ambassador to Poland
- In office 1980–1984
- Preceded by: Ralph Enckell
- Succeeded by: Olavi Rautio

Finnish Ambassador to Italy
- In office 1975–1980
- Preceded by: Jorma Vanamo
- Succeeded by: Paul Jyrkänkallio

Finnish Ambassador to Yugoslavia
- In office 1965–1970
- Preceded by: Olavi Raustila
- Succeeded by: Olli Bergman

Personal details
- Born: Taneli Kaleva Kekkonen; 4 September 1928 Helsinki, Finland
- Died: 11 July 1985 (aged 56) Helsinki, Finland
- Occupation: Diplomat

Taneli Kaleva Kekkonen (4 September 1928 – 11 July 1985) was a Finnish diplomat and the son of Urho Kekkonen, who served as the President of Finland from 1956 to 1982, and author Sylvi Kekkonen.

== Early life and education ==
Kekkonen was born in Helsinki, as one of the twin sons of Urho Kekkonen and Sylvi Kekkonen. He held a Bachelor of Political Science degree.

== Career ==
Kekkonen began his career in the Finnish Ministry of Foreign Affairs in 1952. He became the Finnish ambassador to Belgrade, Yugoslavia in 1975. He later served as ambassador to Athens, Rome, Malta, and Warsaw. In 1984, he was appointed as the Finnish ambassador to Tel Aviv, Israel.

== Personal life ==
In 1952, Kekkonen married Brita Fagerholm, the daughter of K.A. Fagerholm, who served as the Prime Minister of Finland from 1948 to 1950 and from 1956 to 1957. They had two children, Timo (born 1957) and Tea (born 1963).

== Death ==
In the early 1980s, Kekkonen was caught drunk driving, which resulted in the Finnish Foreign Ministry calling him back from Tel Aviv. Following the incident, Kekkonen became deeply depressed and told his wife Brita that he was going to commit suicide. She pleaded with him to wait for at least a year. During that time, Kekkonen sat in his office at the Ministry of Foreign Affairs during office hours, but no assignments were given to him.

On July 11, 1985, Kekkonen was found dead in his home after committing suicide by hanging.

== Sources ==
=== Further reading ===
- Linnankivi, Marja (2010). Kekkosten miniänä (in Finnish). Tammi. ISBN 978-951-31-5366-3.
- Montonen, Pia Maria (2014). Valtakunnan miniä: Brita Kekkonen (in Finnish). Helsinki: WSOY. ISBN 978-951-0-40241-2.
