= Gerbe (disambiguation) =

A gerbe is an algebraic construct in mathematics.

Gerbe may also refer to:

== Places ==
- Gerbe, Aínsa, a village in the Aínsa-Sobrarbe municipality, Aragon, Spain
- Communauté de communes de la Gerbe, a federation of municipalities in the Seine-et-Marne département, France

== Companies and organizations ==
- Gerbe (lingerie), a manufacturer of hosiery and lingerie founded in 1895
- La Gerbe, a weekly newspaper of the French collaboration with Nazi Germany during World War II

== People ==
- Nathan Gerbe, an American ice hockey player
- Zéphirin Gerbe (1810-1890) French naturalist

== Animals ==
- Gerbe's Vole (Microtus gerbei), a species of rodent in the family Cricetidae

== Mathematics ==
- Bundle gerbe
