= List of Estonian punk bands =

This is a list of Estonian punk bands:

Name	Year of foundation
Propeller	1980
Vennaskond	1984
J.M.K.E.	1986
Singer Vinger	1986
Vürst Trubetsky & J.M.K.E.	1986
Röövel Ööbik	1987
The Tuberkuloited	1991
The Flowers of Romance	1999

== See also ==
- Estonian punk
