= Vainola =

Family name

Vainola is an Estonian surname. Notable people with the surname include:

- Alfred Vainola (1894–1942), Estonian politician
- Allan Vainola (born 1965), Estonian singer, guitarist, and composer
- David Vainola (born 1961), Canadian television and film writer and producer
- Kätlin Vainola (born 1978), Estonian children’s writer and poet

== See also ==
- Väinölä, Finnish surname
