= Mondot =

Mondot may refer to:

- Mondot, a village in the Aínsa-Sobrarbe municipality, Aragon
- Château Troplong Mondot, a Bordeaux wine from the appellation Saint-Émilion
