= Arro (surname) =

Arro is an Estonian surname, meaning "stone hill". Notable people with the surname include:

- Edgar Arro (1911–1978), Estonian composer
- Elmar Arro (1899–1985), Estonian music historian
- Christian Arro (1885–1942), Estonian agriculturist and politician
- Jaak Arro (born 1957), Estonian stage artist and painter
- Lembit Arro (1930–2022), Estonian politician
- Kalev Arro (1915–1974), Estonian partisan
- Mikk-Mihkel Arro (born 1984), Estonian decathlete

== See also ==
- Gemma Arró (born 1980), Catalan ski mountaineer
- Aaro
