= Guaso =

Village in Aragon, Spain

Coordinates: 42°25′N 0°06′E

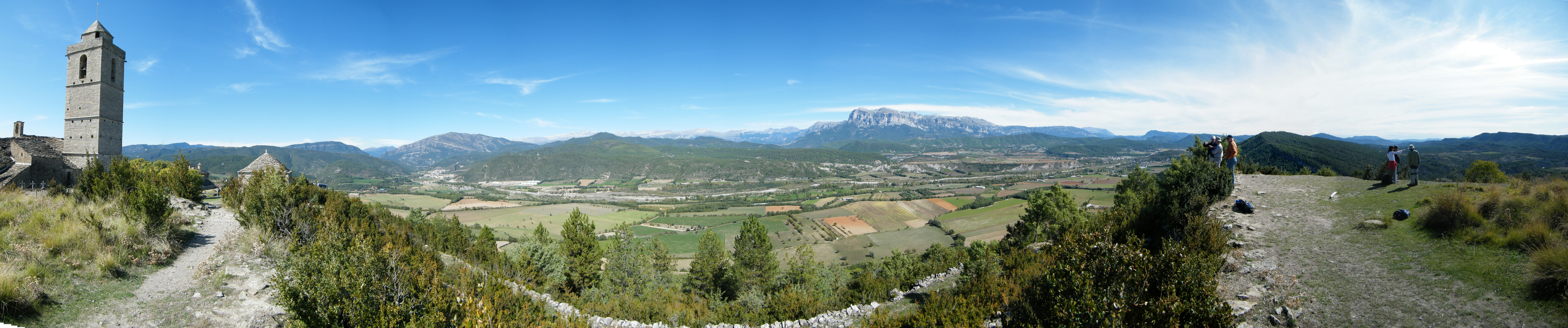
Panoramic view from Guaso

Guaso Village is a village in the Aínsa-Sobrarbe municipality, Aragon, Spain.

It is a small hilltop village in the Pyrenees. The village has a tower which forms a prominent landmark, visible from the nearby ancient town of Ainsa. The hilltop provides panoramic views of the area which features many famous geological features such as the Boltana anticline to the west, the Penya Montanyesa mountain to the north and the town of Ainsa to the east.

== Gallery ==
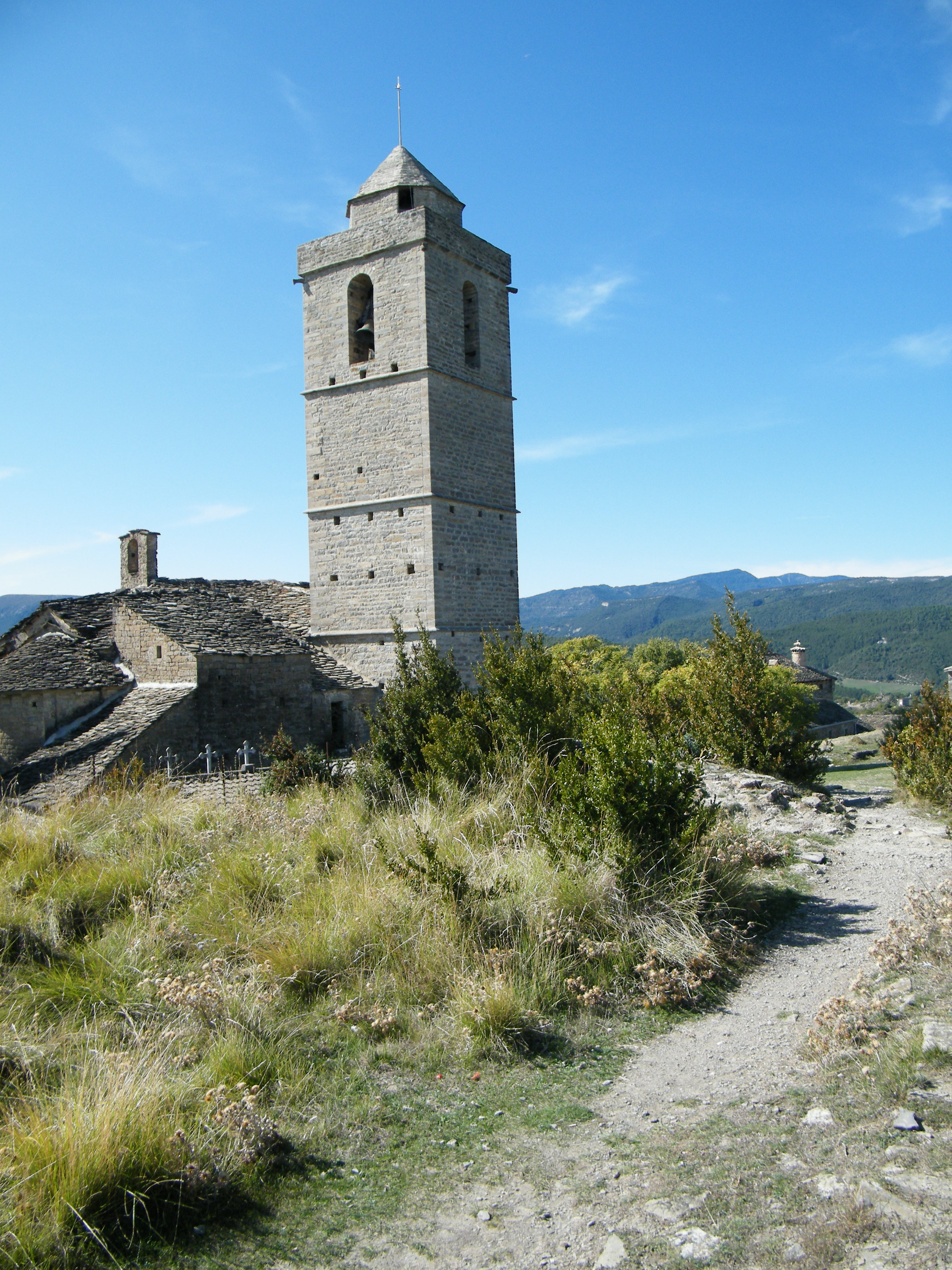
San Quilez tower in Guaso

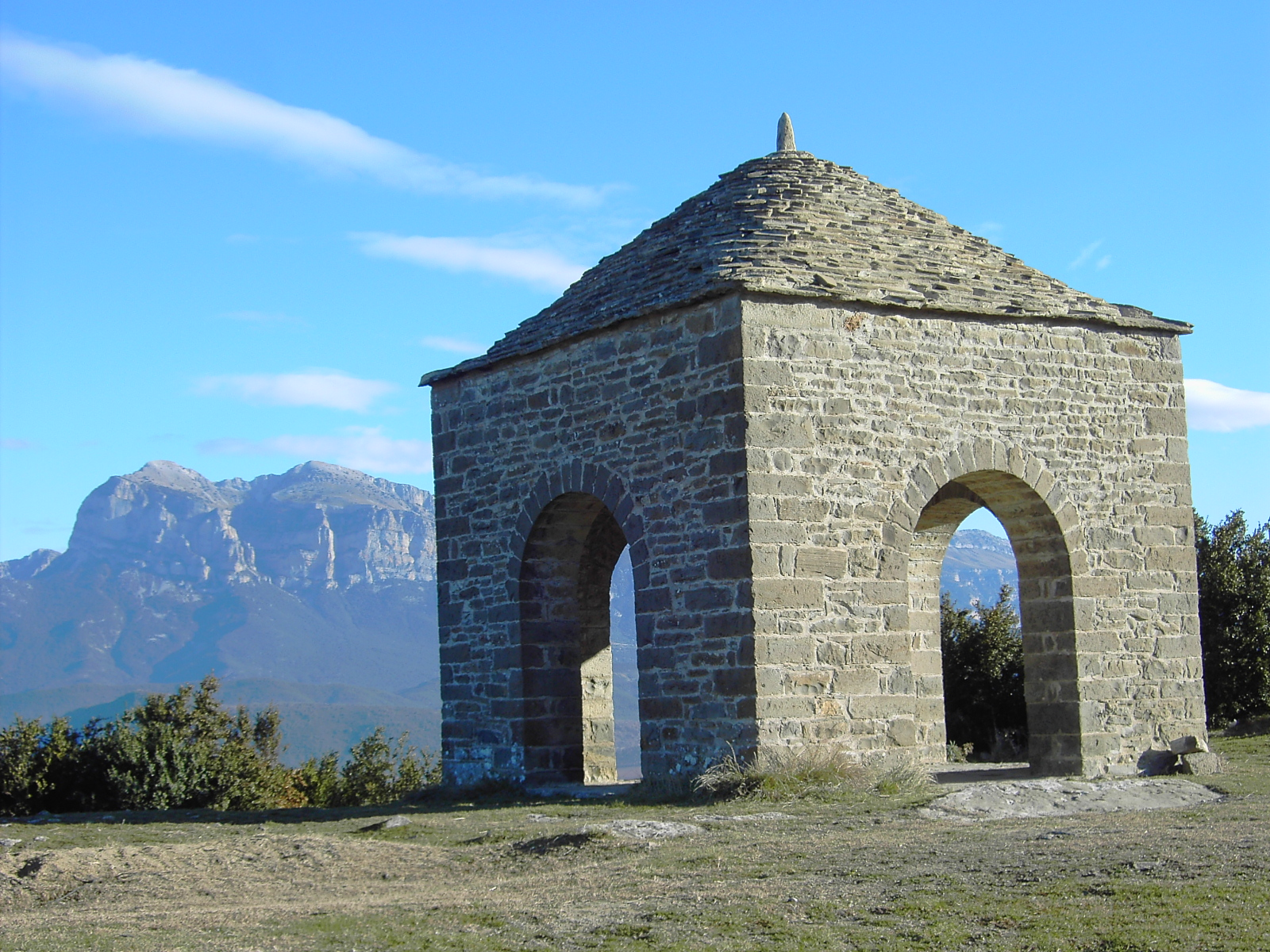
Exconjuratory in Guaso; the massive Penya Montanyesa is in the background
