= Väinölä =

Väinölä is a Finnish surname. Notable people with the surname include:

- Kalle Väinölä (born 1971), Finnish retired professional golfer
- Hele Väinölä (born 1977), Finnish scientist and inventor
- Osmo Väinölä (1928–2024), Finnish diplomat and ambassador
- Ville Väinölä (born 1996), Finnish ice hockey defenceman

== See also ==
- Vainola, Estonian surname
