= Külmale maale =

1989 album by J.M.K.E.

Studio album by J.M.K.E.
- Released: November 1989
- Recorded: October 1989 at Shabby Road Studios, Helsinki, Finland
- Genre: Punk rock
- Label: Stupido Twins Records

J.M.K.E. chronology
Külmale maale (1989)	Gringode Kultuur (1993)

Külmale maale is an album released in 1989 by an Estonian punk rock band J.M.K.E.

It consists of songs written by Villu Tamme in the 1980s. It was first released as an LP in 1989 and as a CD in 1993. The album is considered by music critics to be the best Estonian album ever made.

== Track listing ==
1. "Valge liblika suvi"
2. "Tere perestroika"
3. "Mu vanaisa oli desertöör"
4. "Tsensor"
5. "Käed üles, Virumaa!"
6. "Elab veel Beria"
7. "Internatsid"
8. "Külmale maale"
9. "Tbilisi tänavad"
10. "Nad ei tea mu nime"
11. "Meid aitab psühhiaatria"
12. "Lõputu laupäev"

=== CD bonus tracks ===
1. "Pieni mies, iso tuoppi"
2. "Magamistoa aknast paistab keemiakombinaat"
3. "Lahendus on kaos"
4. "Tere perestroika I"
5. "Tere perestroika II"
6. "Sõjavägi kohustab" (demo)
7. "Lahendus on kaos II" (demo)

== Personnel ==
- Vocals and guitar - Villu Tamme
- Bass - Lembit Krull
- Drums - Venno Vanamölder
- Producing - Stupido Twins
