= Gringode Kultuur =

Gringode kultuur

Studio album by J.M.K.E.
- Released: 1993
- Recorded: 1992–1993
- Genre: Punk rock
- Label: Stupido Twins Records

J.M.K.E. chronology
Külmale maale (1989)	Gringode kultuur (1993)	Sputniks in Pectopah (1995)

Gringode kultuur is an album released in 1993 by an Estonian punk rock band J.M.K.E.

It's the second album by one of the most famous Estonian punk bands.

== Track listing ==
1. "Intro: Saatanlik sõnum"
2. "Tulevik on tunni aja pärast"
3. "Koer"
4. "Võõras sõda"
5. "Maailmalõpp koju kätte"
6. "Ajutine tuli"
7. "Valentina"
8. "Pitsunda"
9. "Nägu kakane"
10. "Enamuse tahe"
11. "Viimane põlvkond"
12. "Kuniks elul veel on antud olla"

== Personnel ==
- Vocals and guitar - Villu Tamme
- Bass - Lembit Krull
- Drums - Ardo Põder
