= Mait Vaik =

Estonian writer and musician

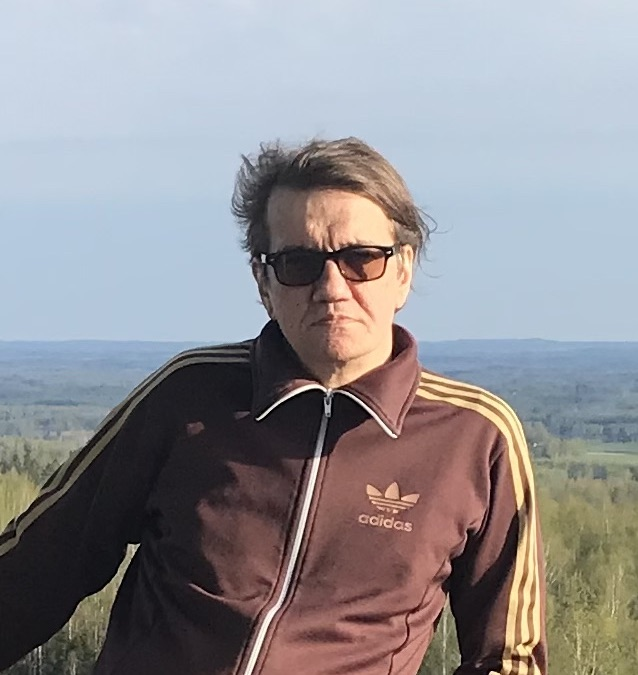
Mait Vaik

Mait Vaik (born August 22, 1969, in Tallinn) is an Estonian writer and musician, a member of Estonian Writers' Union since 2016.

He has played bass guitar in several alternative rock bands, e.g. Vennaskond, Metro Luminal and Sõpruse Puiestee, while also providing those bands with lyrics. Several songs written to his words have achieved nationwide popularity. The Estonian Writers Online Dictionary describes his poetry as 'socially sensitive, serious and empathetic in its authorial stance'.

Awards:

- 2020: European Union Prize for Literature nomination
- 2015: Friedebert Tuglas short story prize for Puhtus (Purity)

== Works ==
- 2012: poetry collection "Kõigil on alati õigus" ("Everyone is always right")
- 2013: short novel "Juss ja vennad" ("Juss and brothers")
- 2014: collection of short novels "Tööpäeva lõpp" ("End of workday")
- 2016: collection of short novels "Meeleparanduseta" ("Unrepentant")
- 2018: novel "Kurvake sügis" ("Sad Autumn")
- 2021: short novel "Simulatsioon" ("Simulation")
- 2023: novel "Hamilgtonide saaga" ("Saga of the Hamilgtons")
