= Camporrotuno =

Camporrotuno Camporretuno, Camparretuno
- Locality
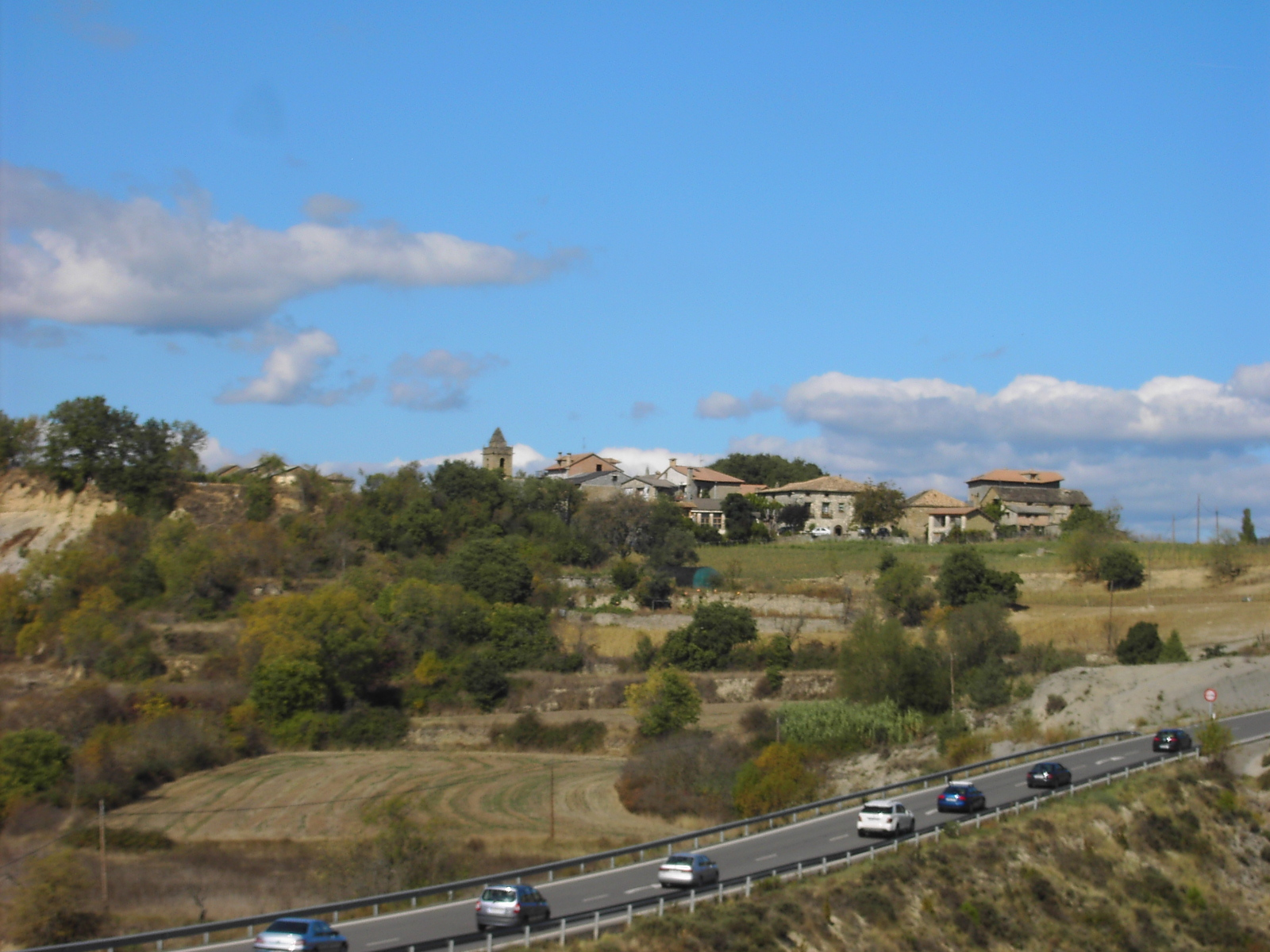

- Location within Aragon Location within Spain
- Coordinates: 42°20′42″N 0°9′38″E
- Country: Spain
- Autonomous community: Aragon
- Province: Province of Huesca
- Municipality: Aínsa-Sobrarbe
- Elevation: 578 m (1,896 ft)

Population
  - Total: 22

Camporrotuno (Aragonese: Camporretuno or Camparretuno) is a locality located in the municipality of Aínsa-Sobrarbe, in Huesca province, Aragon, Spain. In 2020, it had a population of 22.

== Geography ==
Camporrotuno is located 107km east-northeast of Huesca.
