= La Pardina =

La Pardina A Pardina
- Locality
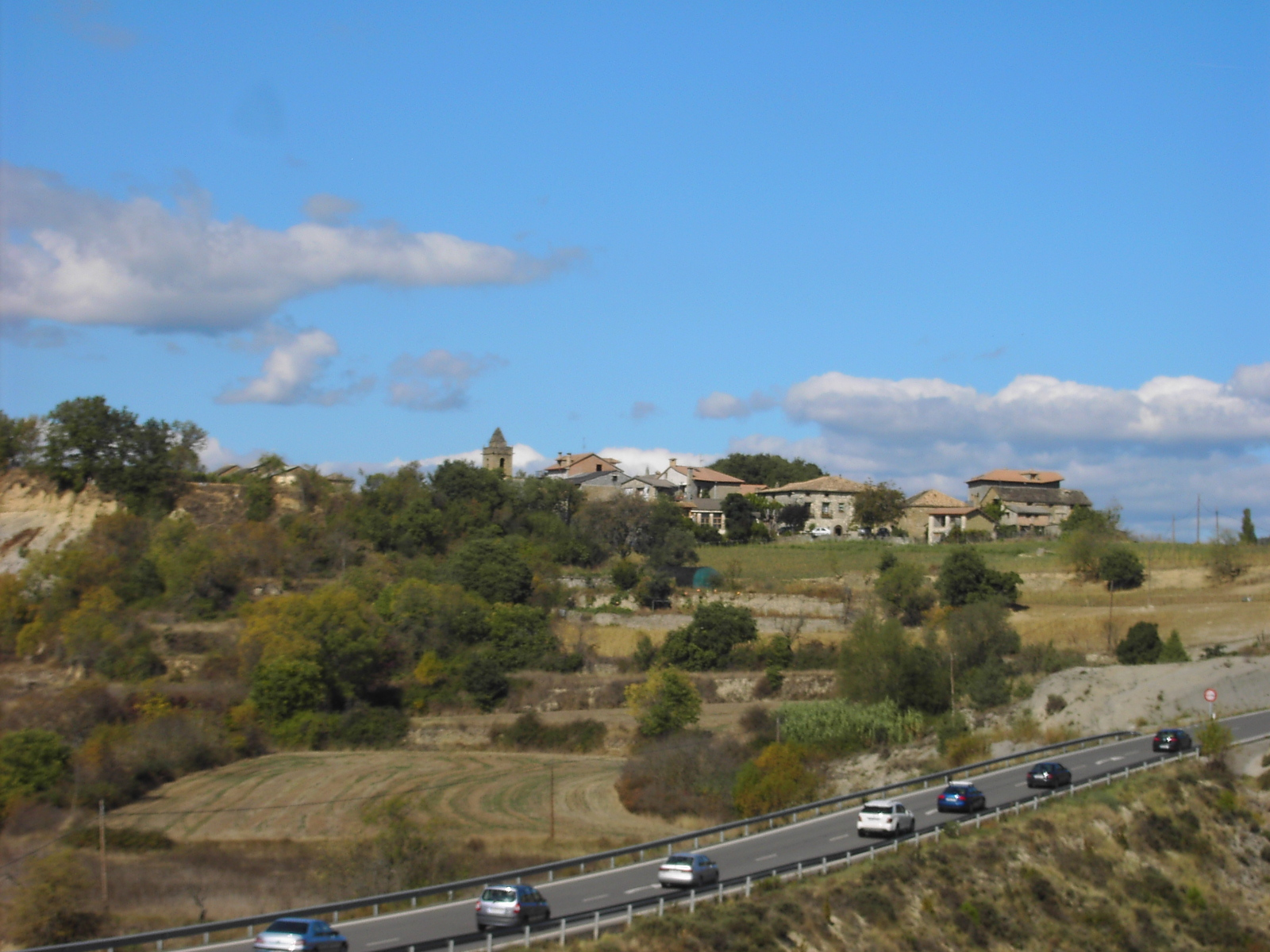

- Location within Aragon Location within Spain
- Coordinates: 42°19′2″N 0°9′38″E
- Country: Spain
- Autonomous community: Aragon
- Province: Province of Huesca
- Municipality: Aínsa-Sobrarbe
- Elevation: 573 m (1,880 ft)

Population
  - Total: 9

La Pardina (Aragonese: A Pardina) is a locality located in the municipality of Aínsa-Sobrarbe, in Huesca province, Aragon, Spain. As of 2020, it has a population of 9.

== Geography ==
La Pardina is located 101km east-northeast of Huesca.
