= Las Bellostas =

Las Bellostas As Bellostas
- Locality
- Location within Aragon Location within Spain
- Coordinates: 42°21′16″N 0°0′41″W
- Country: Spain
- Autonomous community: Aragon
- Province: Province of Huesca
- Municipality: Aínsa-Sobrarbe
- Elevation: 1,093 m (3,586 ft)

Population
  - Total: 7

Las Bellostas (Aragonese: As Bellostas) is a locality located in the municipality of Aínsa-Sobrarbe, in Huesca province, Aragon, Spain. As of 2020, it has a population of 7.

== Geography ==
Las Bellostas is located 83km northeast of Huesca.
