= Kätlin Vainola =

Estonian children's writer and poet

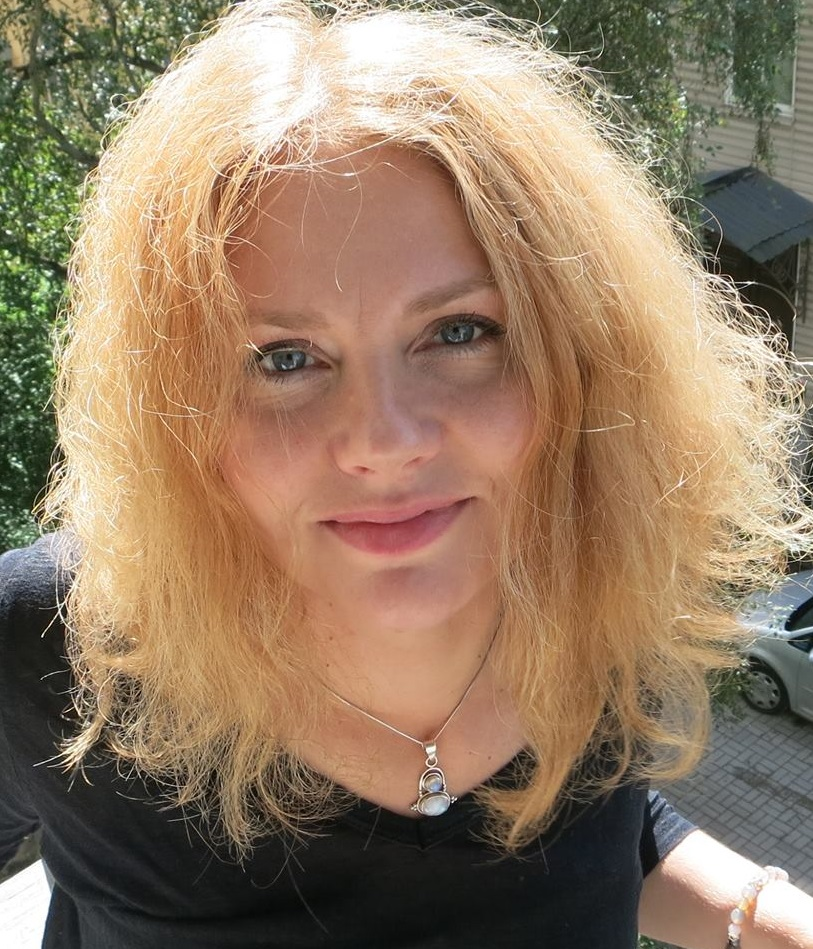
Kätlin Vainola.

Kätlin Vainola (born 30 September 1978 in Tallinn) is a contemporary Estonian children’s writer and poet. She sometimes uses the pen name Marie Myrk.

== Biography ==
Born in Tallinn, she spent her earliest years in the subdistrict of Kopli before the family moved to Põlva. The family later returned to Tallinn where she graduated from secondary school at the Pääsküla Gymnasium.

Vainola graduated from Tallinn University in Estonian philology in 2002 and has worked as a teacher, project manager, and editor and has written lyrics for the bands Vennaskond and Sõpruse Puiestee. She currently works as the editor-in-chief of the children's magazine Hea Laps. Since 2014 she is a member of the Estonian Writers' Union.

== Personal ==
Kätlin Vainola is married to musician Allan Vainola. They have two sons.

== Bibliography ==
- Ville, Tänapäev 2006
- Mia, Konrad ja avanevad uksed (Mia, Conrad, and the Opening Doors), Tänapäev 2008
- Kelli – peaaegu haldjas (Kelly – Almost a Fairy), Pegasus 2008
- Metsaelu aabits (The ABCs of Forest Life), Menu Kirjastus 2009
- Tiigielu aabits (The ABCs of Pond Life; with Aleksei Turovski), Menu Kirjastus 2011
- Suvevaheaeg koolis (Summer Break at School), Tallinna Keskraamatukogu 2011
- Karuelu aabits (The ABCs of Bear Life; with Peep Männil), Menu Kirjastus 2012
- Lift, Pegasus 2013
- Kus on armastus? (Where Is Love?), Päike ja Pilv 2014, 2017
- Kelli hakkab piraadiks (Kelly Becomes a Pirate), Pegasus 2014
- Sonja ja kass (Sonya and the Cat), Pegasus, 2015
- Poiss, kes joonistas kaarte (The Boy Who Drew Maps)
- Nähh Pariisis (Naa in Paris), Päike ja Pilv 2017
- Krips-kraps, eesti laps (Estonian Child – Mild and Wild), Eesti Instituut 2017
- Lood julgetest Eesti tüdrukutest (Stories of Brave Estonian Girls), Pegasus 2018
- Minu Eesti seiklus (My Estonian Adventure), Päike ja Pilv 2019

== Awards ==
- 2005 Children's Story Competition My First Book, 3rd place (Ville)
- 2009 Good Children's Book (Kelly – Almost a Fairy)
- 2011 Good Children's Book (The ABCs of Pond Life)
- 2013 Good Children's Book (Lift)
- 2013 The Knee-High Book Competition, 1st place (Where is Love?)
- 2014 The White Ravens (Lift)
- 2014 Good Children's Book (Where is Love?)

== Translations ==
German

- Lift, Willegoos 2015
- Wo ist die Liebe?, BaltArt 2015

Italian

- A che piano va? Sinnos 2016

Lithuanian

- Liftas, 700 eilučių 2016
