= Aínsa-Sobrarbe =

Aínsa-Sobrarbe L'Aínsa-Sobrarbe (Aragonese)
- Municipality
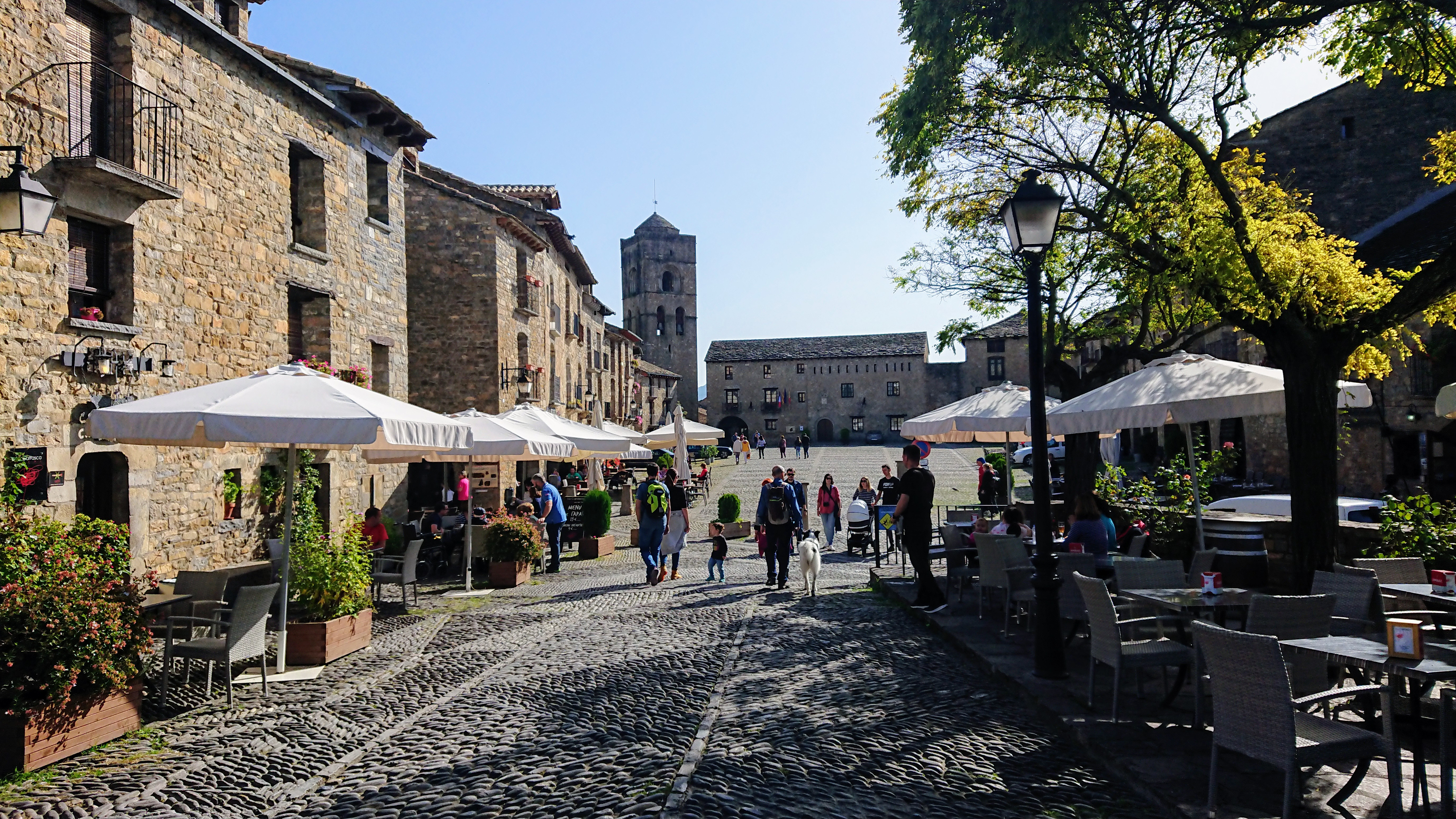
- Plaza Mayor, Ainsa

- Coat of arms

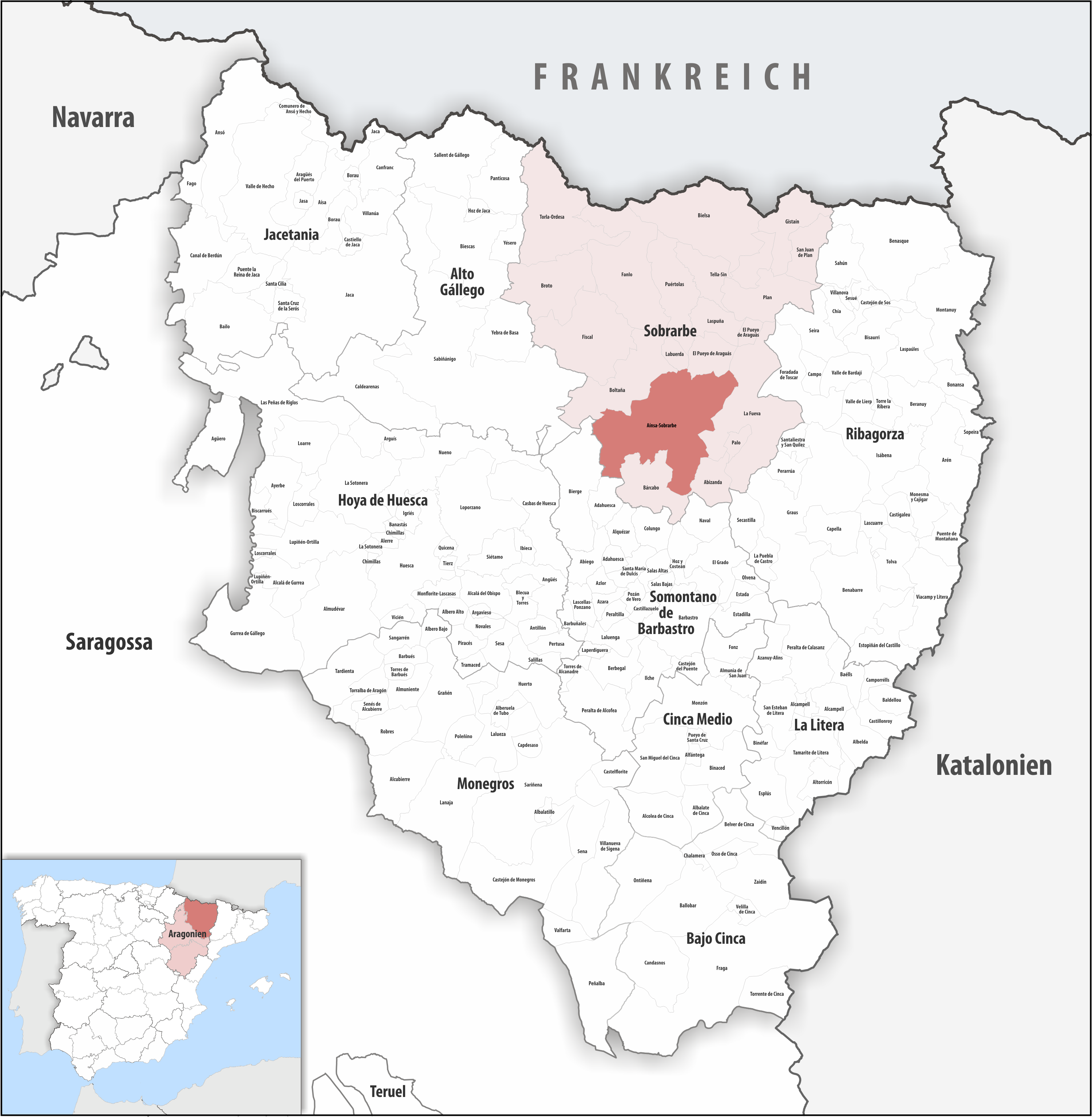
- Municipal location within the Comarca of Sobrarbe and Province of Huesca.

- Location within Spain
- Coordinates: 42°25′2″N 0°8′19″E
- Country: Spain
- Autonomous community: Aragon
- Province: Huesca
- Comarca: Sobrarbe

Government
  - Mayor: José Miguel Cheliz Pérez

Area
  - Total: 285 km^{2} (110 sq mi)
- Elevation: 569 m (1,867 ft)

Population (2025-01-01)
  - Total: 2,335
  - Density: 8.19/km^{2} (21.2/sq mi)
- Time zone: UTC+1 (CET)
  - Summer (DST): UTC+2 (CEST)

Aínsa-Sobrarbe (in Aragonese: L'Aínsa-Sobrarbe) is a municipality located in the province of Huesca, Aragon, Spain. As of 2010 (INE), the municipality has a population of 2,180 inhabitants.

Aínsa is the economic development capital of the Sobrarbe comarca (administrative subdivision).

== Villages ==
Aside from the main town of Aínsa, the following villages are within Aínsa-Sobrarbe's municipal area:

- Arcusa
- Arro
- Banastón
- Las Bellostas
- Camporrotuno
- Castejón de Sobrarbe
- Castellazo
- Coscojuela de Sobrarbe
- El Coscollar
- Gerbe
- Griébal
- Guaso
- Jabierre de Olsón
- Latorre
- Latorrecilla
- Mondot
- Morillo de Tou
- Olsón
- La Pardina
- La Ripa
- Paúles de Sarsa
- Santa María de Buil
- Sarratillo
- Sarsa de Surta
- Urriales

=== Uninhabited villages and hamlets ===
The following formerly populated places are now uninhabited: Bagüeste, Pacinias, Cerollar, Casa Sierra, Casa Linás, Escapa, La Lecina, Linés, La Capana and Puibayeta.

There are also small hamlets in the municipality limits that are inhabited only occasionally, like Casa Almunia, Molino López, Molino Villacampa, Molino Jabierre, Sarratiás, Sarrato, Coronillas, Pelegrín and Gabardilla.

== Twin towns ==
- Arreau, France

== See also ==
- List of municipalities in Huesca
