= Olsón =

Olsón O Elsón
- Locality
- Location within Aragon Location within Spain
- Coordinates: 42°16′24″N 0°7′23″E
- Country: Spain
- Autonomous community: Aragon
- Province: Province of Huesca
- Municipality: Aínsa-Sobrarbe
- Elevation: 668 m (2,192 ft)

Population
  - Total: 16

Olsón (Aragonese: O Elsón) is a locality located in the municipality of Aínsa-Sobrarbe, in Huesca province, Aragon, Spain. As of 2020, it has a population of 16.

== Geography ==
Olsón is located 90km east-northeast of Huesca.
