= Morillo de Tou =

Morillo de Tou Moriello de Tou
- Locality
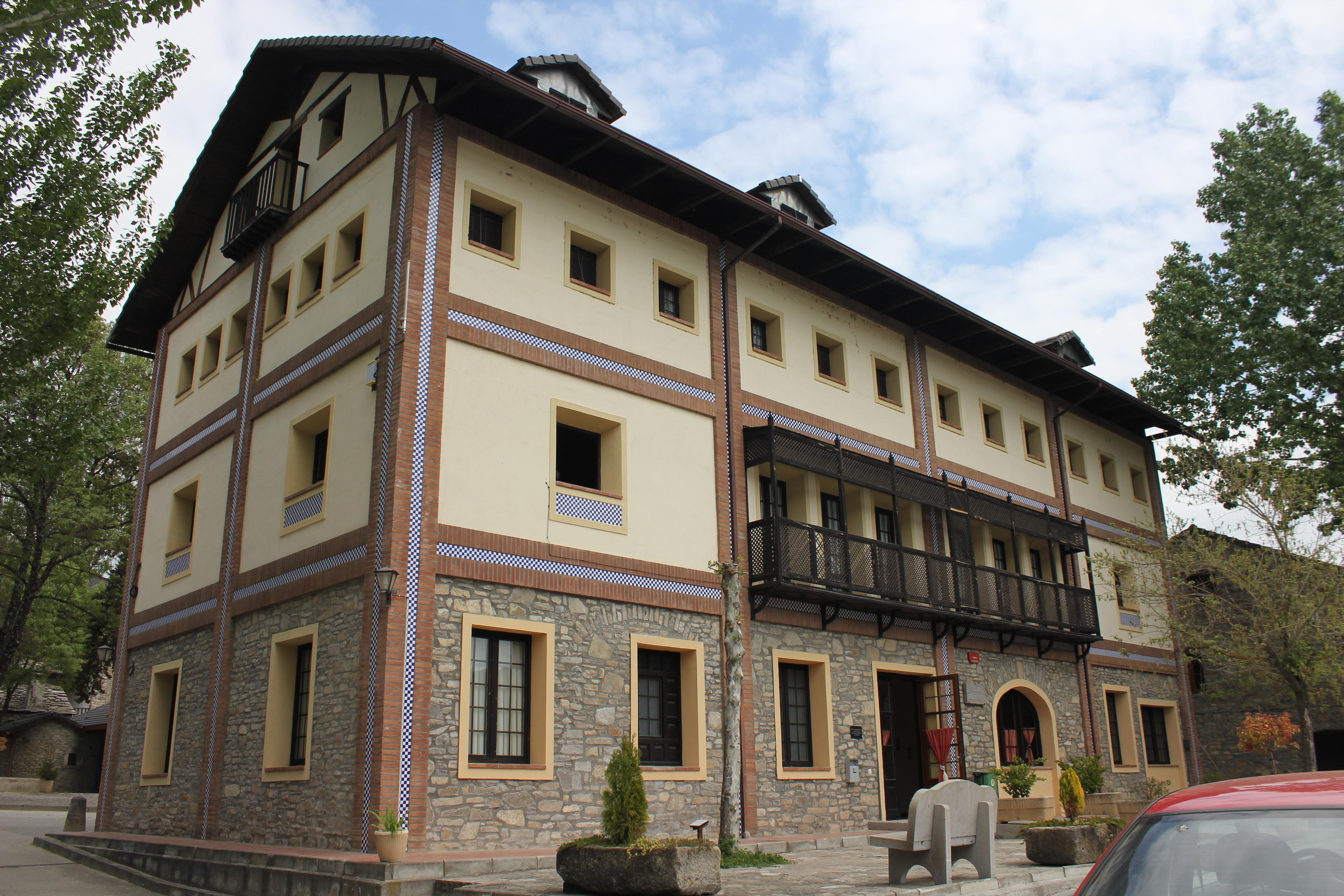

- Location within Aragon Location within Spain
- Coordinates: 42°22′35″N 0°9′13″E
- Country: Spain
- Autonomous community: Aragon
- Province: Province of Huesca
- Municipality: Aínsa-Sobrarbe
- Elevation: 539 m (1,768 ft)

Population
  - Total: 8

Morillo de Tou (Aragonese: Moriello de Tou) is a locality located in the municipality of Aínsa-Sobrarbe, in Huesca province, Aragon, Spain. As of 2020, it has a population of 8.

== Geography ==
Morillo de Tou is located 102km east-northeast of Huesca.
