= El Coscollar =

El Coscollar O Coscollar
- Locality
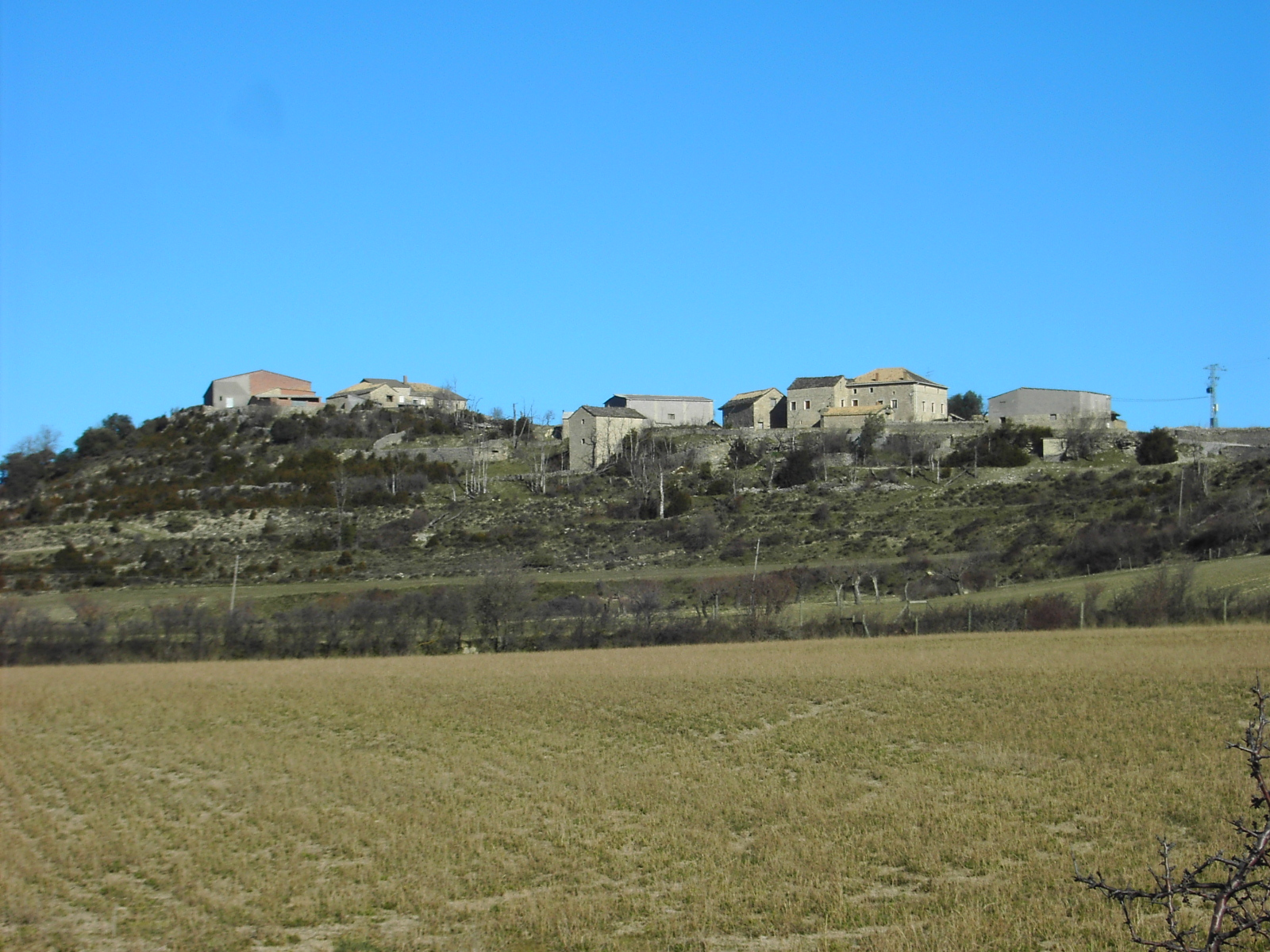

- Location within Aragon Location within Spain
- Coordinates: 42°18′44″N 0°2′54″E
- Country: Spain
- Autonomous community: Aragon
- Province: Province of Huesca
- Municipality: Aínsa-Sobrarbe
- Elevation: 902 m (2,959 ft)

Population
  - Total: 6

El Coscollar (Aragonese: O Coscollar) is a locality located in the municipality of Aínsa-Sobrarbe, in Huesca province, Aragon, Spain. As of 2020, it has a population of 6.

== Geography ==
El Coscollar is located 86km east-northeast of Huesca.
