= Paúles de Sarsa =

Paúles de Sarsa Paúls de Sasa
- Locality
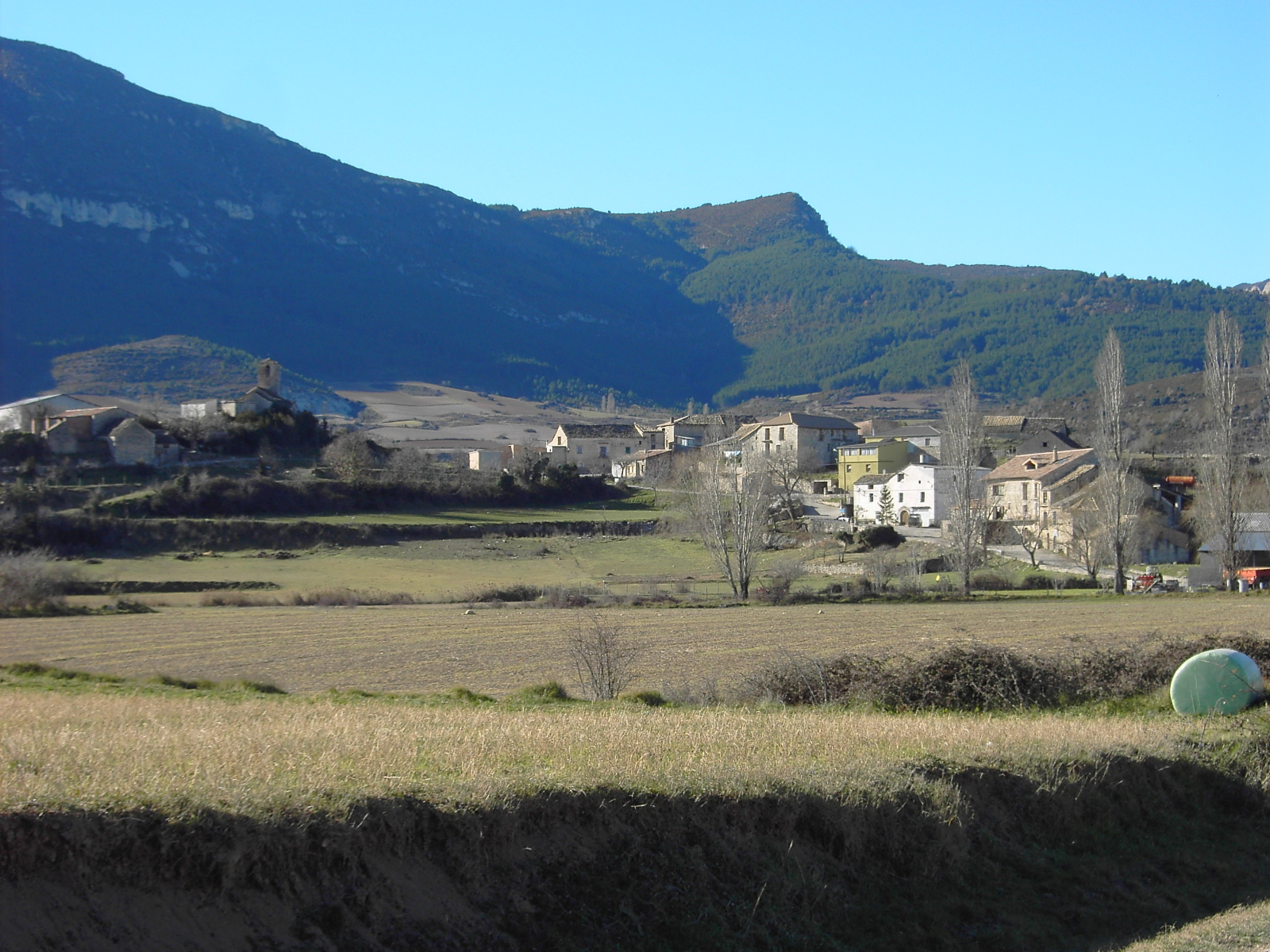

- Location within Aragon Location within Spain
- Coordinates: 42°18′19″N 0°2′28″E
- Country: Spain
- Autonomous community: Aragon
- Province: Province of Huesca
- Municipality: Aínsa-Sobrarbe
- Elevation: 855 m (2,805 ft)

Population
  - Total: 19

Paúles de Sarsa (Aragonese: Paúls de Sasa) is a locality located in the municipality of Aínsa-Sobrarbe, in Huesca province, Aragon, Spain. As of 2020, it has a population of 19.

== Geography ==
Paúles de Sarsa is located 91km east-northeast of Huesca.
