= Arcusa =

Arcusa L'Arcusa
- Locality
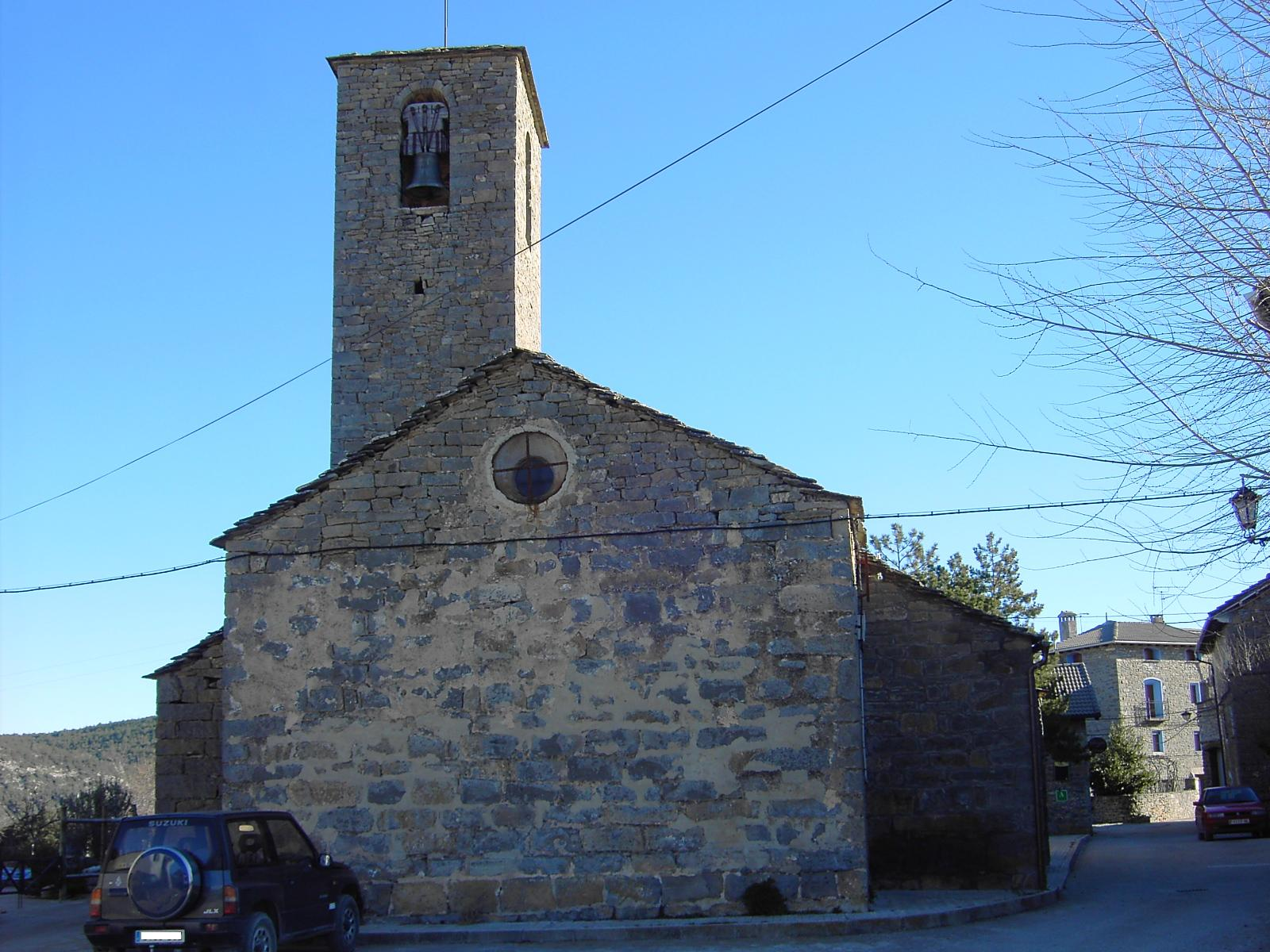

- Location within Aragon Location within Spain
- Coordinates: 42°19′8″N 0°4′43″E
- Country: Spain
- Autonomous community: Aragon
- Province: Province of Huesca
- Municipality: Aínsa-Sobrarbe
- Elevation: 876 m (2,874 ft)

Population
  - Total: 34

Arcusa (Aragonese: L'Arcusa) is a locality in the municipality of Aínsa-Sobrarbe, in Huesca province, Aragon, Spain. As of 2020, it has a population of 34.

== Geography ==
Arcusa is located 85km east-northeast of Huesca, capital of the Huesca province.
