= Latorrecilla =

Latorrecilla A Torriciella
- Locality
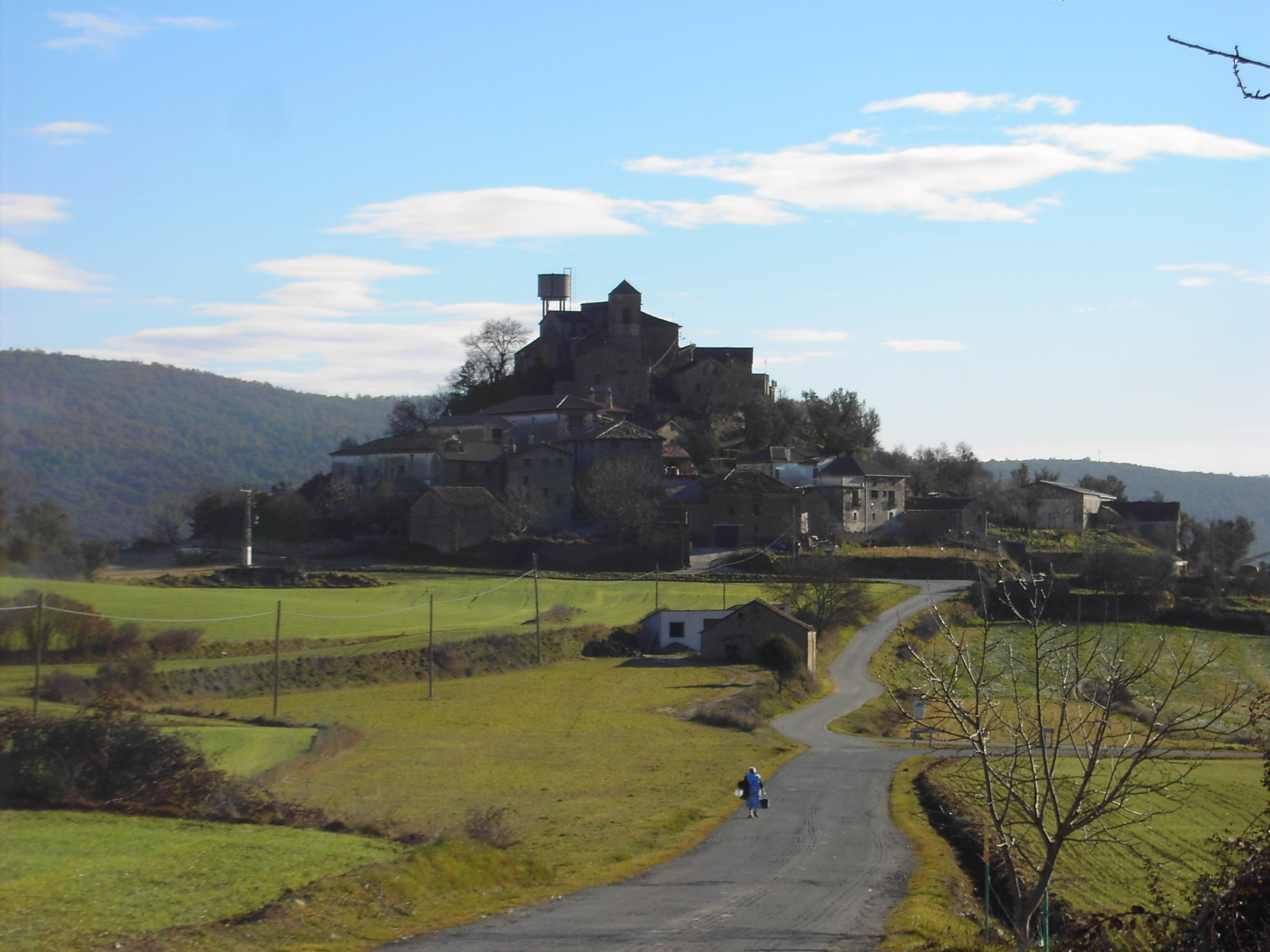

- Location within Aragon Location within Spain
- Coordinates: 42°24′14″N 0°5′11″E
- Country: Spain
- Autonomous community: Aragon
- Province: Province of Huesca
- Municipality: Aínsa-Sobrarbe
- Elevation: 678 m (2,224 ft)

Population
  - Total: 30

Latorrecilla (Aragonese: A Torriciella) is a locality located in the municipality of Aínsa-Sobrarbe, in Huesca province, Aragon, Spain. As of 2020, it has a population of 30.

== Geography ==
Latorrecilla is located 98 km (61 mi) northeast of Huesca.
