= Castejón de Sobrarbe =

Castejón de Sobrarbe Castillón de Sobrarbe
- Locality
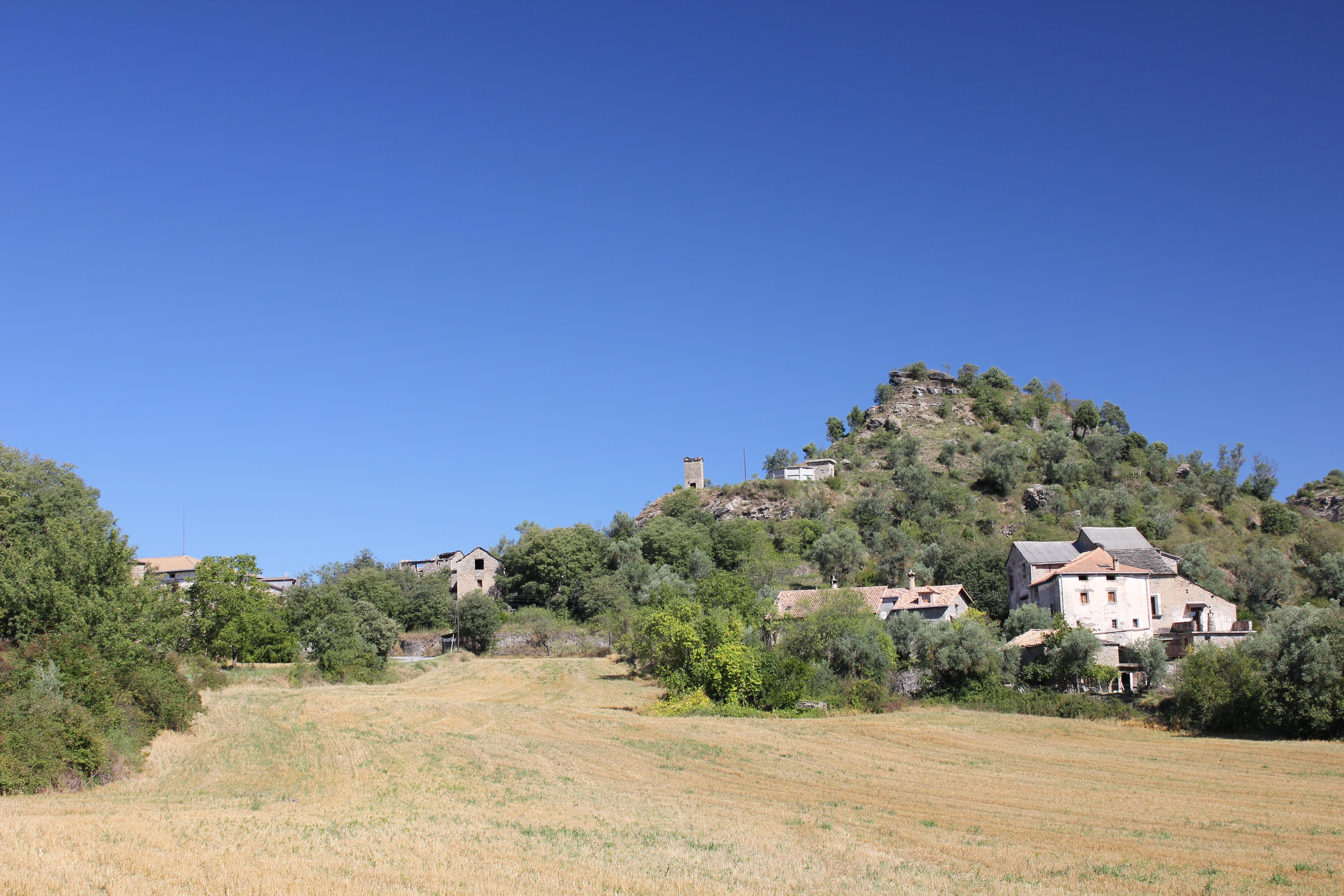

- Location within Aragon Location within Spain
- Coordinates: 42°19′10″N 0°8′17″E
- Country: Spain
- Autonomous community: Aragon
- Province: Province of Huesca
- Municipality: Aínsa-Sobrarbe
- Elevation: 600 m (2,000 ft)

Population
  - Total: 7

Castejón de Sobrarbe (Aragonese: Castillón de Sobrarbe) is a locality located in the municipality of Aínsa-Sobrarbe, in Huesca province, Aragon, Spain. As of 2020, it has a population of 7.

== Geography ==
Castejón de Sobrarbe is located 104km east-northeast of Huesca.
