= Sarsa de Surta =

Sarsa de Surta Sasa de Surta
- Locality
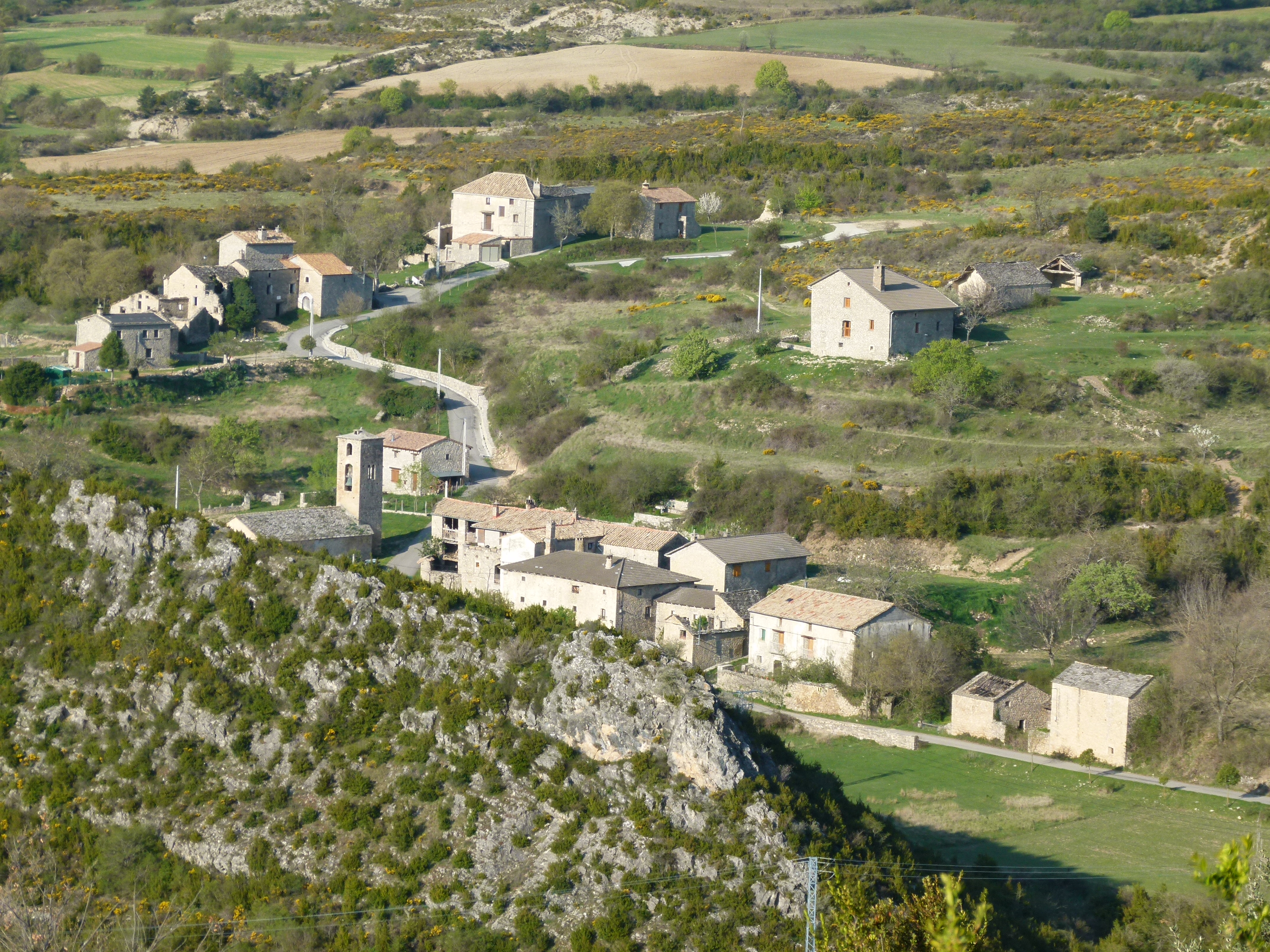

- Location within Aragon Location within Spain
- Coordinates: 42°18′57″N 0°0′48″E
- Country: Spain
- Autonomous community: Aragon
- Province: Province of Huesca
- Municipality: Aínsa-Sobrarbe
- Elevation: 889 m (2,917 ft)

Population
  - Total: 5

Sarsa de Surta (Aragonese: Sasa de Surta) is a locality located in the municipality of Aínsa-Sobrarbe, in Huesca province, Aragon, Spain. As of 2020, it has a population of 5.

== Geography ==
Sarsa de Surta is located 88km east-northeast of Huesca.
