= Jabierre de Olsón =

Jabierre de Olsón Chabierre d'o Elsón
- Locality
- Location within Aragon Location within Spain
- Coordinates: 42°17′11″N 0°9′11″E
- Country: Spain
- Autonomous community: Aragon
- Province: Province of Huesca
- Municipality: Aínsa-Sobrarbe
- Elevation: 566 m (1,857 ft)

Population
  - Total: 14

Jabierre de Olsón (Aragonese: Chabierre d'o Elsón) is a locality located in the municipality of Aínsa-Sobrarbe, in Huesca province, Aragon, Spain. As of 2020, it has a population of 14.

== Geography ==
Jabierre de Olsón is located 98km east-northeast of Huesca.
