= Santa María de Buil =

- Locality
- Location within Aragon Location within Spain
- Coordinates: 42°21′59″N 0°5′15″E
- Country: Spain
- Autonomous community: Aragon
- Province: Province of Huesca
- Municipality: Aínsa-Sobrarbe
- Elevation: 908 m (2,979 ft)

Population
  - Total: 18

Santa María de Buil is a locality located in the municipality of Aínsa-Sobrarbe, in Huesca province, Aragon, Spain. As of 2020, it has a population of 18.

== Geography ==
Santa María de Buil is located 106km east-northeast of Huesca.
