= Castellazo =

Castellazo Castellaz
- Locality
- Location within Aragon Location within Spain
- Coordinates: 42°19′59″N 0°3′35″E
- Country: Spain
- Autonomous community: Aragon
- Province: Province of Huesca
- Municipality: Aínsa-Sobrarbe
- Elevation: 922 m (3,025 ft)

Population
  - Total: 20

Castellazo (Aragonese: Castellaz) is a locality located in the municipality of Aínsa-Sobrarbe, in Huesca province, Aragon, Spain. As of 2020, it has a population of 20.

== Geography ==
Castellazo is located 87km east-northeast of Huesca.
