= Banastón =

- Locality
- Location within Aragon Location within Spain
- Coordinates: 42°24′22″N 0°10′2″E
- Country: Spain
- Autonomous community: Aragon
- Province: Province of Huesca
- Municipality: Aínsa-Sobrarbe
- Elevation: 595 m (1,952 ft)

Population
  - Total: 94

Banastón is a locality located in the municipality of Aínsa-Sobrarbe, in Huesca province, Aragon, Spain. As of 2020, it has a population of 94.

== Geography ==
Banastón is located 100km east-northeast of Huesca.
