= Griébal =

- Locality
- Griebal
- Location within Aragon Location within Spain
- Coordinates: 42°23′5″N 0°12′11″E
- Country: Spain
- Autonomous community: Aragon
- Province: Province of Huesca
- Municipality: Aínsa-Sobrarbe
- Elevation: 745 m (2,444 ft)

Population
  - Total: 0

Griébal or Griebal is a locality located in the municipality of Aínsa-Sobrarbe, in Huesca province, Aragon, Spain. As of 2020, it has a population of 0.

== Geography ==
Griébal is located 107km east-northeast of Huesca.
