= Latorre, Aínsa =

Latorre A Torre
- Locality
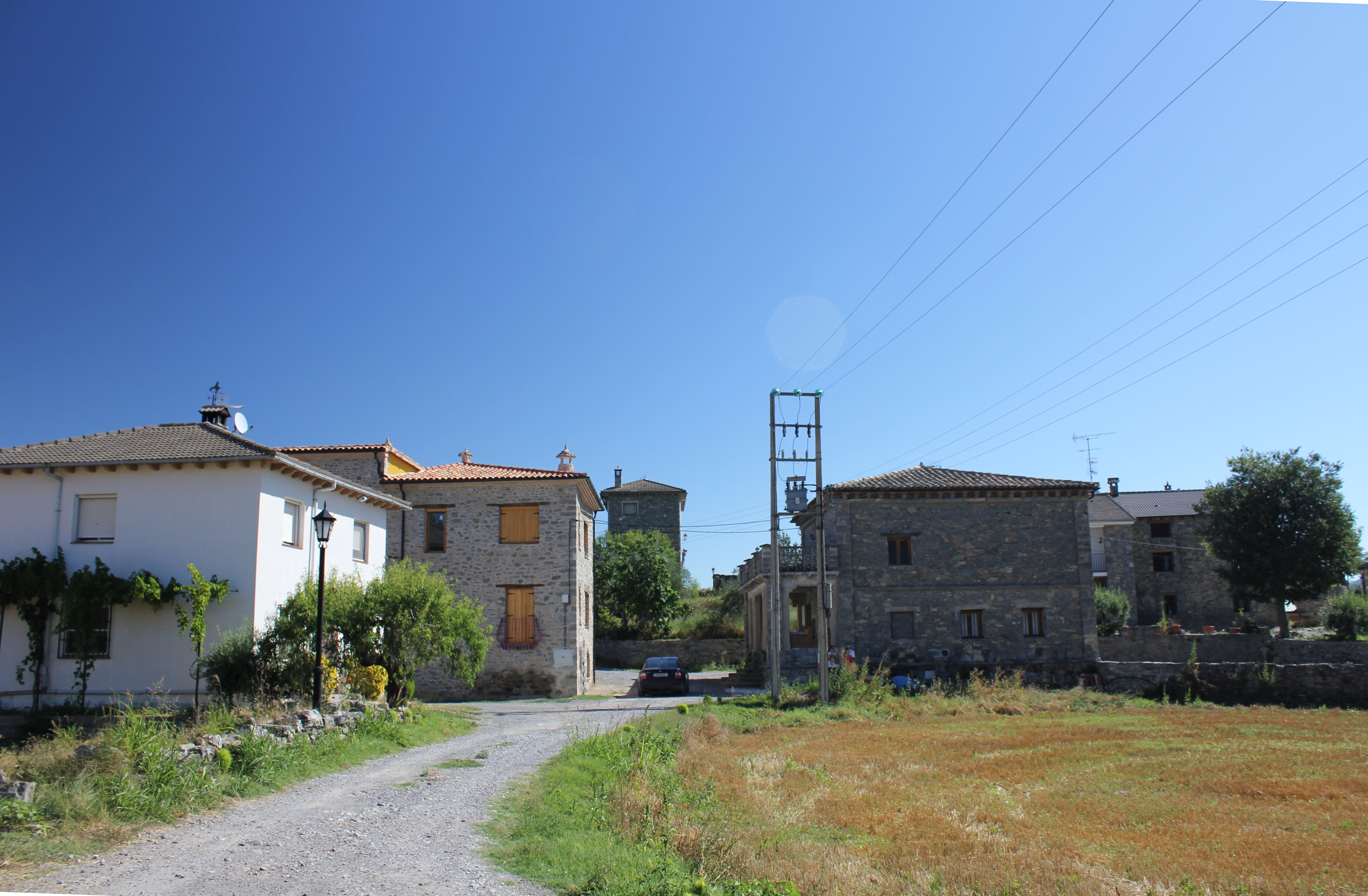

- Location within Aragon Location within Spain
- Coordinates: 42°18′41″N 0°9′11″E
- Country: Spain
- Autonomous community: Aragon
- Province: Province of Huesca
- Municipality: Aínsa-Sobrarbe
- Elevation: 586 m (1,923 ft)

Population
  - Total: 4

Latorre (Aragonese: A Torre) is a locality located in the municipality of Aínsa-Sobrarbe, in Huesca province, Aragon, Spain. As of 2020, it has a population of 4.

== Geography ==
Latorre is located 102km east-northeast of Huesca.
