= Paul Jyrkänkallio =

Finnish diplomat (1922–2004)

Paul Georg Jyrkänkallio (until 1944 Schmidt; 25 May 1922 - 2 May 2004) was a Finnish diplomat.

Jyrkänkallio was born in Koivisto, and obtained a Bachelor of Philosophy degree. He was an ambassador in Sofia from 1969 to 1972, Budapest from 1973 to 1977, then Secretary of State for Foreign Affairs in 1977-1980 and again Ambassador to Rome in 1980 -1985 and Athens 1985–1992. He died in Helsinki, aged 81.
