= Arro, Champhai =

Arro
- village
- Location in Mizoram, India Arro (India)
- Coordinates: 23.5332184°N 93.1359362°E
- Country: India
- State: Mizoram
- District: Champhai
- Block: Khawzawl
- Elevation: 1,394 m (4,573 ft)

Population (2011)
  - Total: 156
- Time zone: UTC+5:30 (IST)
- 2011 census code: 271318

Arro is a village in the Champhai district of Mizoram, India. It is located in the Khawzawl R.D. Block.

== Demographics ==
According to the 2011 census of India, Arro has 42 households. The effective literacy rate (i.e. the literacy rate of population excluding children aged 6 and below) is 91.41%.

Demographics (2011 Census)
	Total	Male	Female
Population	156	87	69
Children aged below 6 years	28	15	13
Scheduled caste	0	0	0
Scheduled tribe	155	86	69
Literates	117	69	48
Workers (all)	102	61	41
Main workers (total)	100	60	40
Main workers: Cultivators	96	59	37
Main workers: Agricultural labourers	0	0	0
Main workers: Household industry workers	0	0	0
Main workers: Other	4	1	3
Marginal workers (total)	2	1	1
Marginal workers: Cultivators	0	0	0
Marginal workers: Agricultural labourers	0	0	0
Marginal workers: Household industry workers	1	0	1
Marginal workers: Others	1	1	0
Non-workers	54	26	28
