= Erkki Mäentakanen =

Finnish diplomat (1933–2018)

Erkki Kalervo Mäentakanen (10 December 1933 Laukaa – 4 June 2018 Helsinki) was a Finnish diplomat, a Bachelor of Business Economics. He was an Ambassador in Tel Aviv and Nicosia from 1982 to 1984 and thereafter Head of Department of the Department of Commerce of the Ministry for Foreign Affairs in 1984–1988. Then he was an Ambassador in Ottawa 1988-1991 and at The Hague 1991–1997.
