= Aaro Kauppi =

Finnish jurist, farmer and politician (1902–1979)

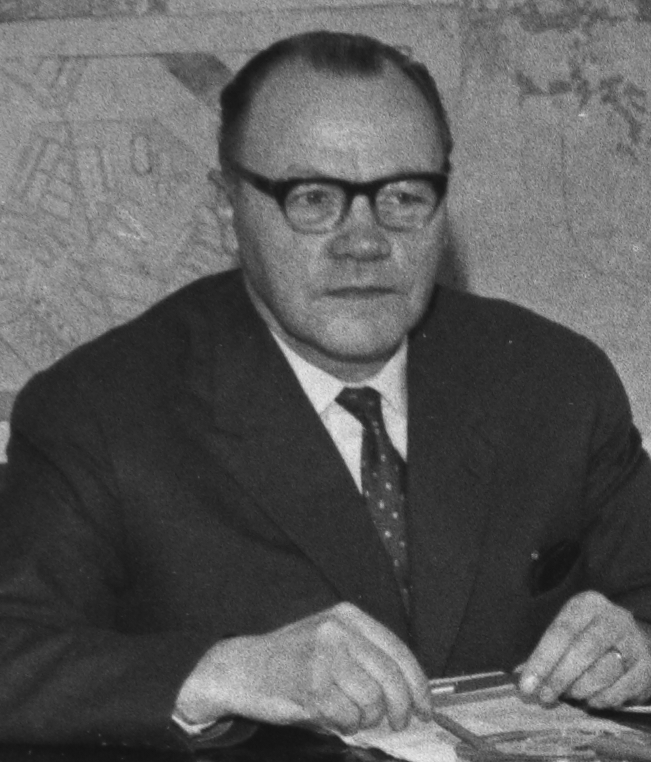
Aaro Kauppi as a member of the election committee of the Oulu Province in the first meeting on November 6, 1961, before the presidential election

Aaro Kauppi (23 November 1902 – 19 August 1979) was a Finnish jurist, farmer and politician, born in Haukipudas. He was a member of the Parliament of Finland from 1951 to 1954, from 1956 to 1958 and from 1963 to 1966, representing the Agrarian League, which changed its name to Centre Party in 1965. He was a presidential elector in the 1956 and 1962 presidential elections.
