= Mondot, Aínsa =

Mondot
- Locality
- Location within Aragon Location within Spain
- Coordinates: 42°17′37″N 0°6′46″E
- Country: Spain
- Autonomous community: Aragon
- Province: Province of Huesca
- Municipality: Aínsa-Sobrarbe
- Elevation: 644 m (2,113 ft)

Population
  - Total: 5

Mondot is a locality located in the municipality of Aínsa-Sobrarbe, in Huesca province, Aragon, Spain. As of 2020, it has a population of 5.

== Geography ==
Mondot is located 87km east-northeast of Huesca.
