= Kaseke =

Kaseke is a surname. Notable people with the surname include:

- Deus Kaseke (born 1994), Tanzanian football striker
- Elson Kaseke (1967-2011), Zimbabwean lawyer
- Noel Kaseke (born 1980), Zimbabwean football midfielder
