= Elmar Arro =

Elmar Arro (2 August 1899 – 14 December 1985) was a music historian. Born in Riga in a German-speaking family, he studied musicology in Berlin and Vienna. He settled in Tartu in Estonia in 1928 and began a career studying the history of Eastern European music. In 1939 he was forced to leave Estonia for Germany, as part of the German–Soviet population transfers. In 1941 during World War II he was drafted into the Wehrmacht, and was later taken prisoner by Soviet troops. In 1955 he was released and settled in Germany, where he pursued his research on Eastern European music. After his retirement he settled in Vienna, where he died in 1985.

== Early life ==
Elmar Arro was born on 2 August 1899 in Riga, the present-day capital of Latvia but at the time part of the Russian Empire, in a German-speaking family. His father came from a peasant family from Viljandi County in Estonia, and was a lawyer working in Riga. Following his graduation from school in Riga, Arro moved, initially to Berlin and later to Vienna, to study musicology and Slavic philology. He graduated in 1928 with a thesis on musical life in Estonia in the 19th century, and then settled in Tartu in Estonia.

== Later life and research ==
For the next decade, Arro was engaged in research on musical history based on archival studies in Tartu and Riga. He was briefly chief editor of an Estonian-language journal on musicology (which however had to cease operation after publishing only one issue), and taught at German-language institutes in Tartu (from 1931) and Riga (1936–38). Though Arro knew some Estonian, he did not feel comfortable using it as an academic language. However, he made efforts to use the language in his communication with Estonian counterparts.

In 1939 he was forced to leave Estonia for Germany, as part of the German–Soviet population transfers. In 1941, during World War II, he was drafted into the Wehrmacht, was later taken prisoner and spent until 1955 in Soviet captivity. After his release he settled in Germany, where he contributed to building up a research institute for East European music in Freiburg in 1959. Around 1964 he moved to Kiel, where he continued his research and published the first four volumes of Musik des Ostens, a publication about Eastern European music. After his retirement in 1966 he settled in Vienna in Austria; in Vienna he founded another periodical on Slavic music, Musica Slavica, of which however only two issues edited by Arro appeared. He died in Vienna on 14 December 1985. His legacy as a researcher has been particularly noted in Estonia, where his work on the history of music was in some ways foundational, and he has also been described as "one of the finest and most erudite scholars of Russian music history and musical life".
