= Gerbe, Aínsa =

Gerbe Cherbe
- Locality
- Location within Aragon Location within Spain
- Coordinates: 42°23′0″N 0°11′1″E
- Country: Spain
- Autonomous community: Aragon
- Province: Province of Huesca
- Municipality: Aínsa-Sobrarbe
- Elevation: 554 m (1,818 ft)

Population
  - Total: 28

Gerbe (Aragonese: Cherbe) is a locality located in the municipality of Aínsa-Sobrarbe, in Huesca province, Aragon, Spain. As of 2020, it has a population of 28.

== Geography ==
Gerbe is located 103km east-northeast of Huesca.
