= Aínsa =

Aínsa L'Aínsa
- Locality
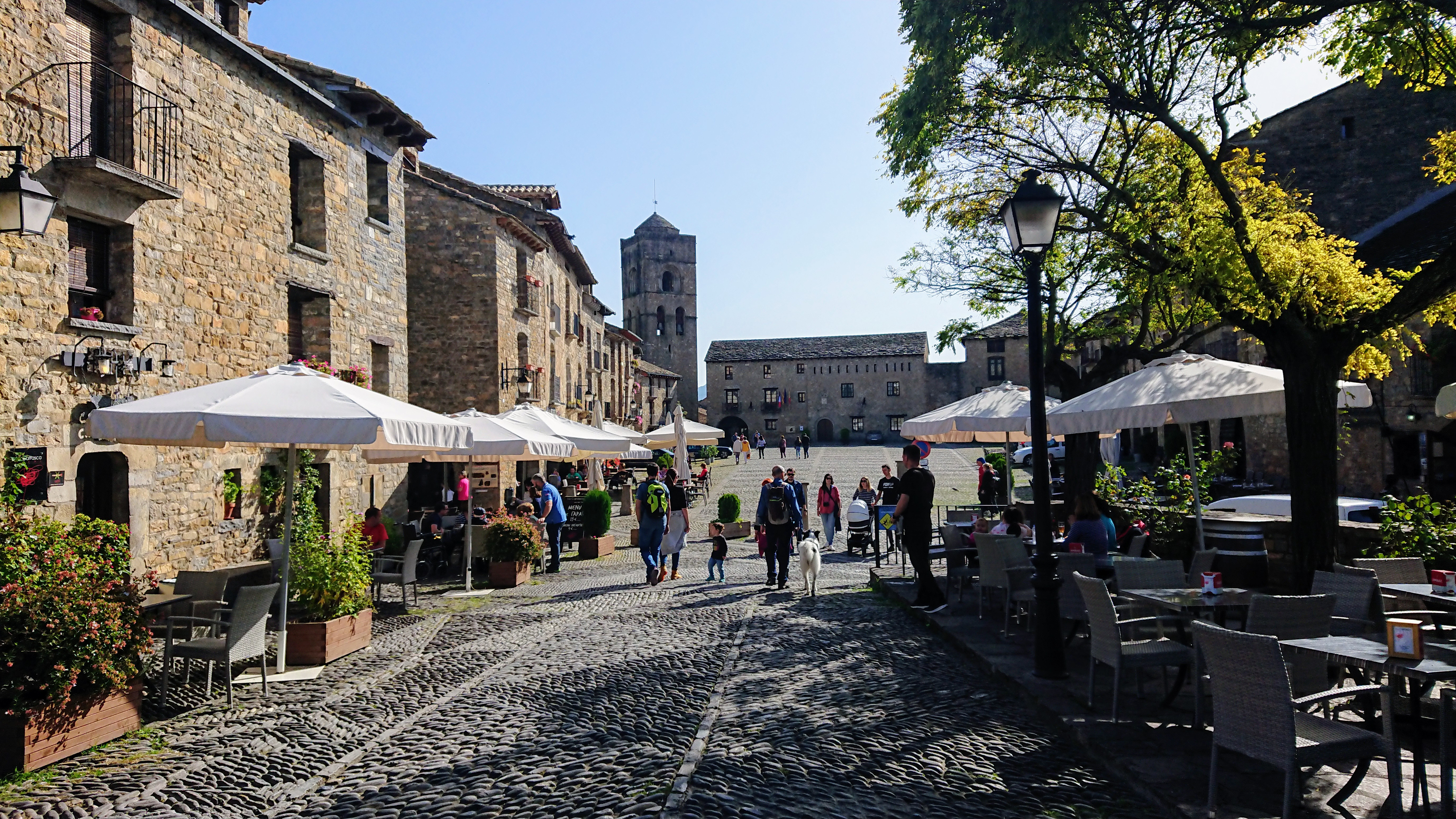

- Map showing Aínsa in a map of Spain
- Country: Spain
- Autonomous region: Aragon
- Province: Huesca
- Comarca: Sobrarbe
- Municipality: Aínsa-Sobrarbe
- Time zone: CET
  - Summer (DST): CEST

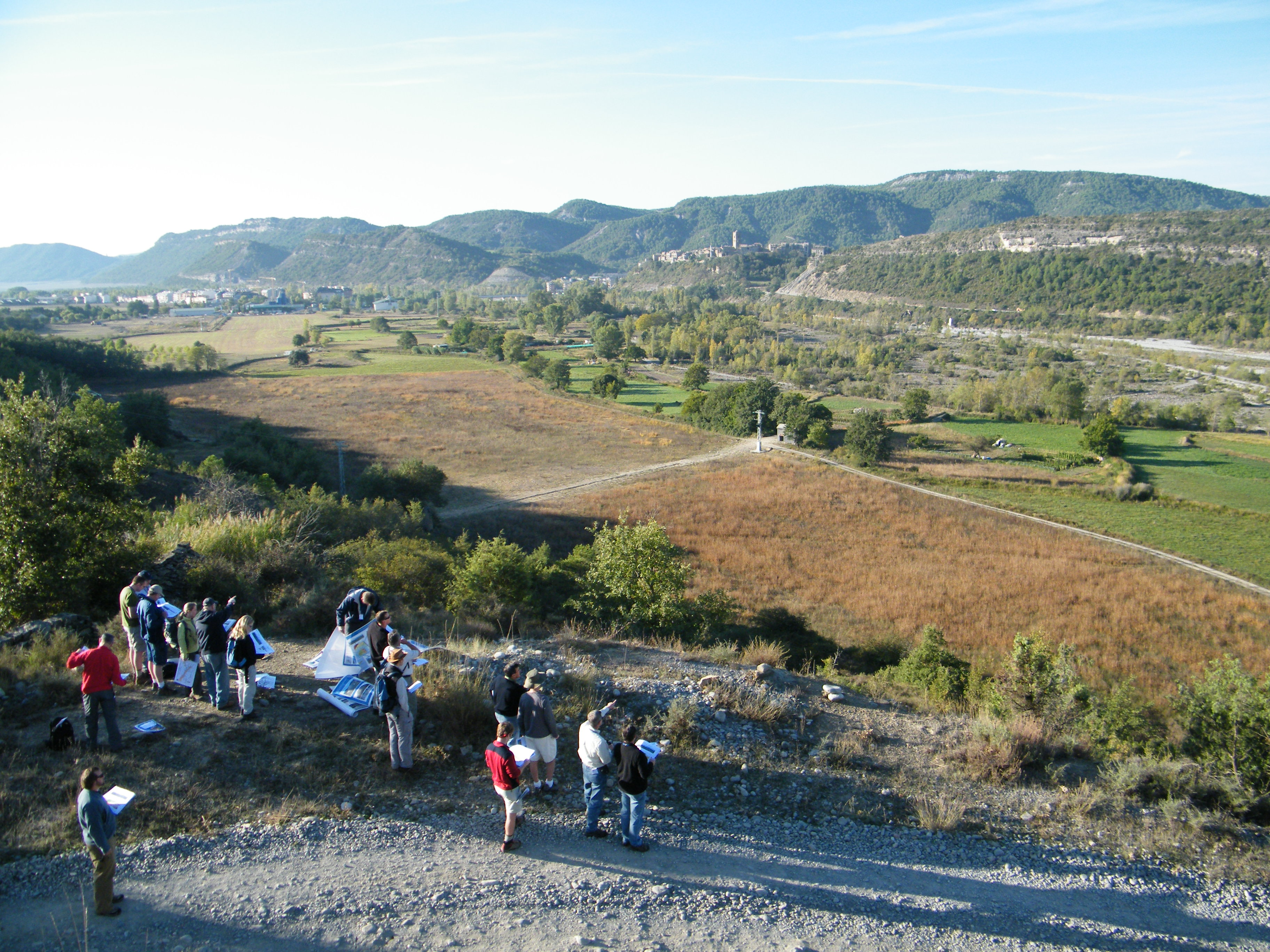
Geoscientists study the cliffs north of Ainsa.

Aínsa (Aragonese: L'Aínsa) is the main town in the Aínsa-Sobrarbe municipal territory, Aragon, Spain.

It is located south of the Pyrenees, in a geologically interesting setting at the north of Huesca. Besides the surrounding mountain landscape, the 12th-century Iglesia parroquial de Santa María church and the 11th-century castle are the main sights of the town.

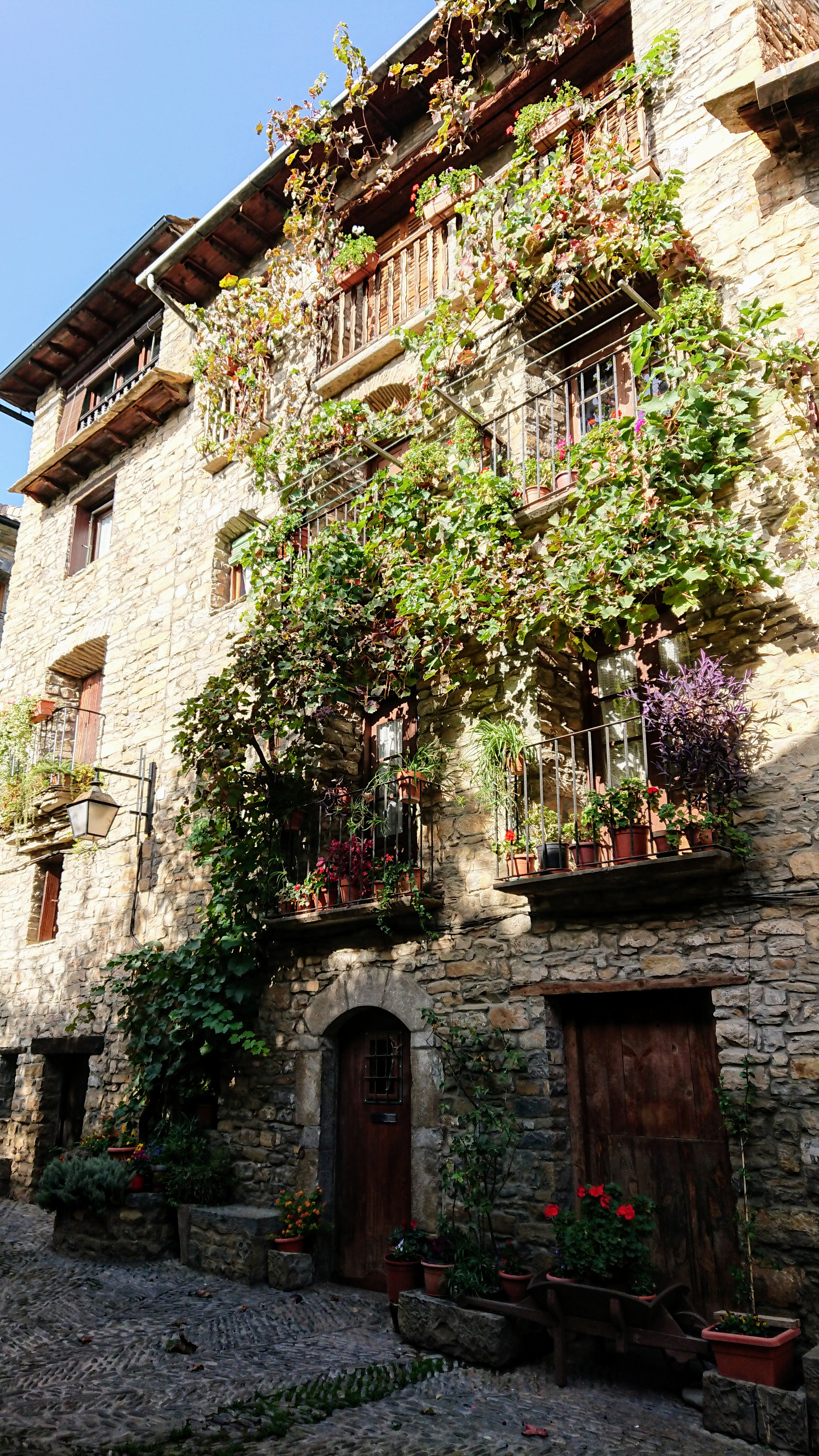
House in Santo Domingo Square

It is believed that there is a connection between the Ainsa and the Anza family surnames.

== See also ==
- Kingdom of Sobrarbe
