= Allan Vainola =

Estonian musician and composer

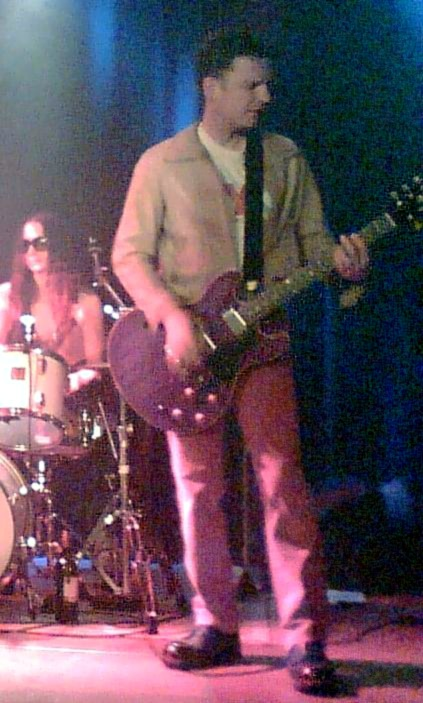
- Allan Vainola (2006).

Background information
- Also known as: Al Vainola
- Born: Allan Annus; 11 March 1965 (age 61); Tartu, then part of Estonian SSR, Soviet Union
- Instruments: vocals, guitar
- Years active: 1980–present
- Website: av.ee

Allan Vainola (also known as Al Vainola, birth name Allan Annus; born 11 March 1965, in Tartu) is an Estonian singer, guitarist and composer. He is best known as the lead singer in such bands as Sõpruse Puiestee; Metro Luminal; Alumiinium, Sinu Sädelev Sõber; Unenäopüüdjad; and as a guitarist in Vennaskond.

Allan Vainola is married to Estonian poet Kätlin Vainola who has also written songs for Sõpruse Puiestee and Vennaskond, and has one son.
