= Gerbe (lingerie) =

French marketer and manufacturer of hosiery and lingeri

- Company type: Clothing
- Industry: Lingerie
- Founded: 1895
- Headquarters: Saint-Vallier, France
- Products: Lingerie, hosiery
- Website: www.gerbe.com

Gerbe is a French marketer and manufacturer of hosiery and lingerie.

== Information ==
The Gerbe brand was founded in the year of 1904 by Stéphane Gerbe. The factory for this company is located in Saint-Vallier in the south of Burgundy, France. The factory has been labelled as "Entreprise du Patrimoine français" that translates in English to "company of French heritage". The company began its business by selling primarily tights and stockings. Over the years the business has expanded to selling various types of hosiery. The company has continued to flourish as a family-owned business through the complications and setbacks of financial institutions and changing leaderships. Alain Regad, who was the owner of Rhovyl, has also become the current owner of Gerbe. The yarn that is used for the hosiery is made from within the Rhovyl. The company produces their products this way so that they have good control over what is happening to ensure excellent quality. Their products are all made in France. There are more than 100 employees that work on location.
