= Arro, Aínsa =

Arro
- Locality
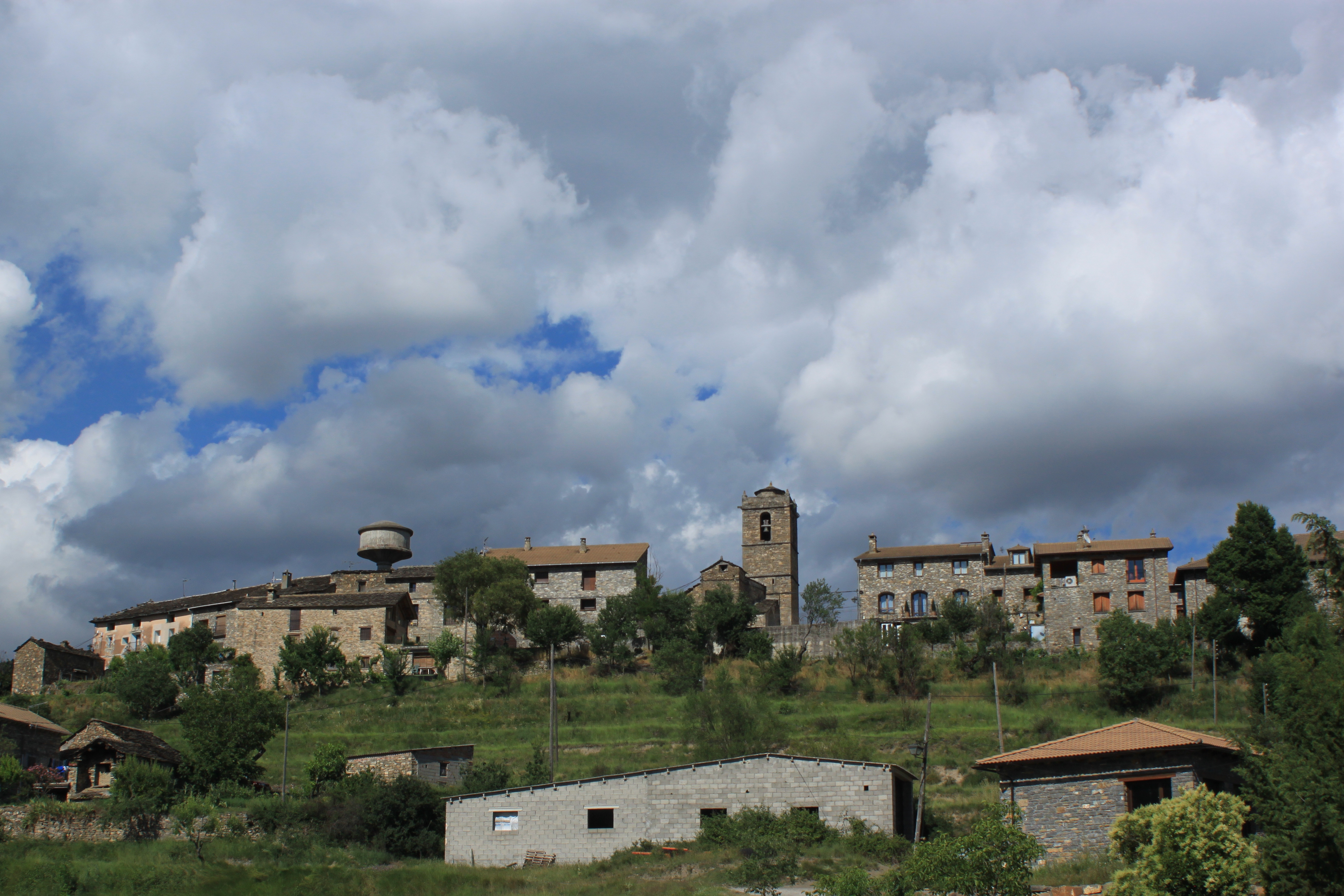

- Location within Aragon Location within Spain
- Coordinates: 42°24′28″N 0°13′26″E
- Country: Spain
- Autonomous community: Aragon
- Province: Province of Huesca
- Municipality: Aínsa-Sobrarbe
- Elevation: 613 m (2,011 ft)

Population
  - Total: 30

Arro is a locality located in the municipality of Aínsa-Sobrarbe, in Huesca province, Aragon, Spain. As of 2020, it has a population of 30.

== Geography ==
Arro is located 106 km east-northeast of Huesca.
