= Aaro Stykki =

Finnish construction foreman and politician (1918–1975)

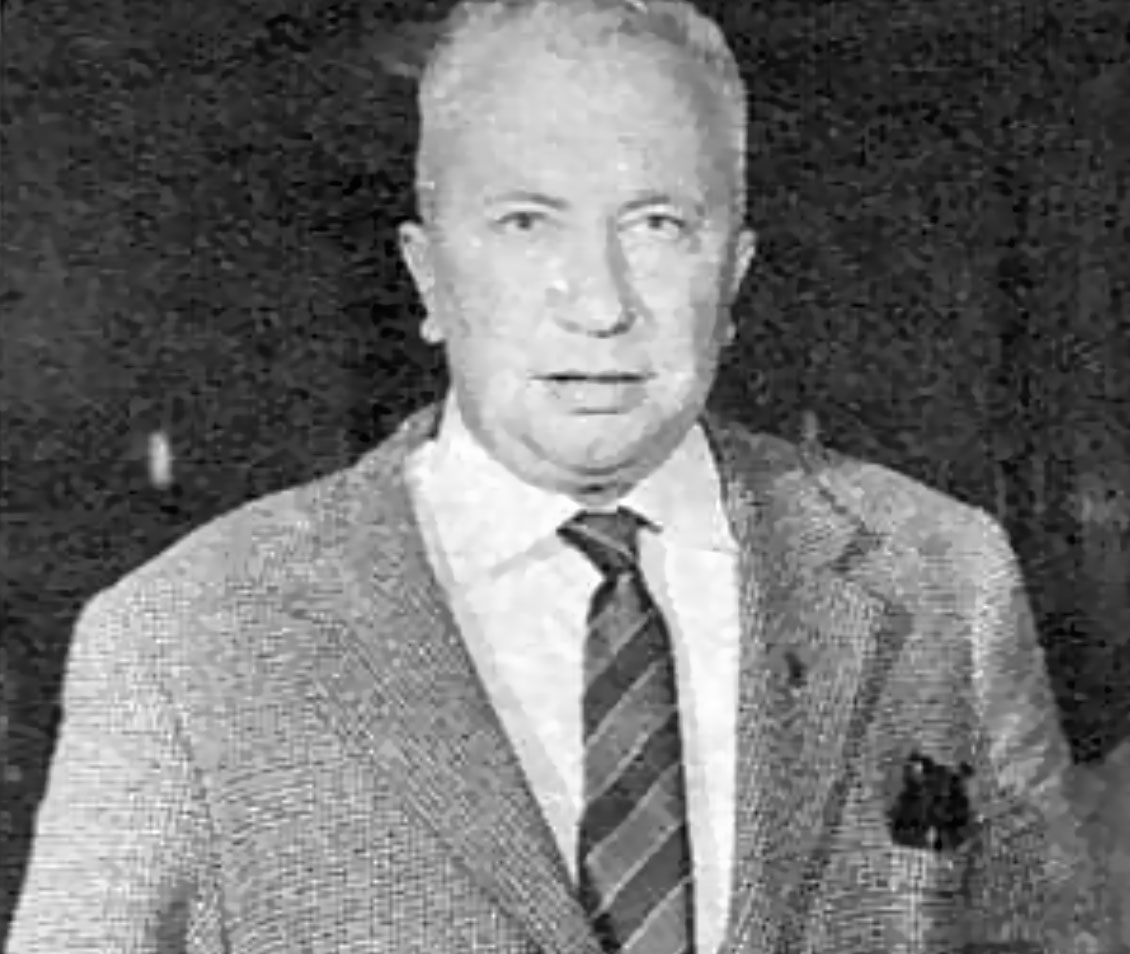
Aaro Stykki

Aaro Veikko Stykki (4 January 1918 – 21 January 1975) was a Finnish construction foreman and politician, born in Johannes. He was a member of the Parliament of Finland from 1958 to 1966, representing the People's Party of Finland until 1965 and the Liberal People's Party (LKP) after that.
