= Aaro Kiviperä =

Finnish modern pentathlete

Personal information
- Born: 6 February 1912 Seinäjoki, Finland
- Died: 11 July 1944 (aged 32) Vuosalmi

Sport
- Sport: Modern pentathlon

Aaro Kullervo Kiviperä (6 February 1912 – 11 July 1944) was a Finnish modern pentathlete. He competed at the 1936 Summer Olympics. During his career, he was the top Finnish pentathlete and was an army champion. He was killed in an air crash during World War II.
