= Jaak Arro =

Estonian stage artist and painter

Jaak Arro (born 19 June 1957 in Tallinn) is an Estonian stage artist and painter.

In 1984 he graduated from Estonian Art Institute in painting speciality. 1995-2003 he taught at Estonian Art Academy (since 1997 professor). He has been an artist for several animated films.

He is married to the painter Epp Maria Kokamägi.

== Works ==
- 1988 – "Papa Carlo teater" (scenarist, artist)
- 1989 – "Noblesse oblige" (scenarist, artist)
- 1993 – "Elutuba" (artist)
