= Osmo Väinölä =

Finnish diplomat

Osmo Tapani Väinölä (21 September 1928 – 27 February 2024) was a Finnish diplomat and ambassador. He was Head of the Administrative Department of the Ministry for Foreign Affairs from 1978 to 1979, Ambassador in Budapest 1979–1985 and Tel Aviv 1985–1989. He was a circulating Ambassador to West Africa countries from 1989 to 1991 and Ambassador to Riyadh in 1991–1993.
