= J.M.K.E. =

Estonian musical group

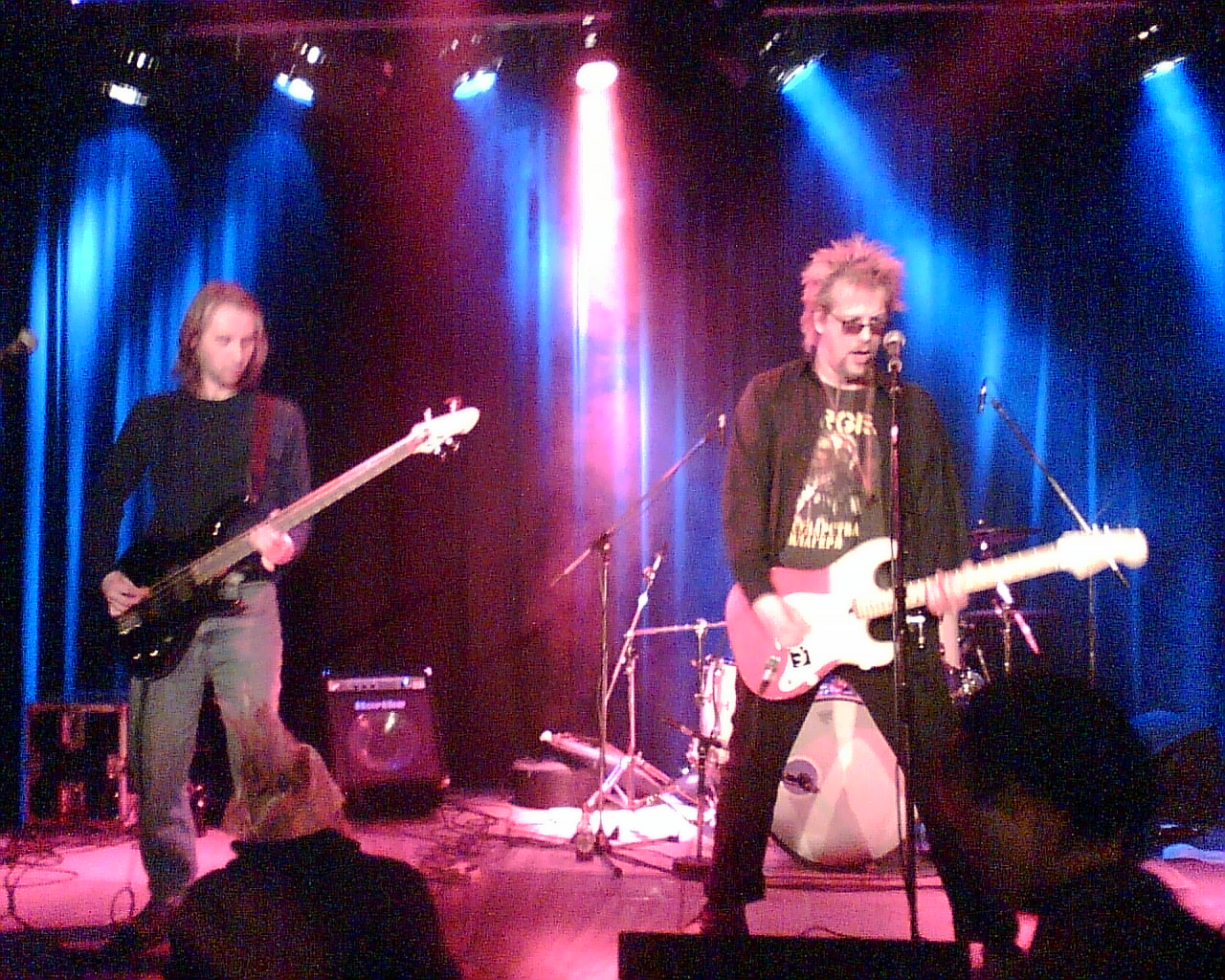
- J.M.K.E. in Tikkurila (2006).

Background information
- Origin: Tallinn
- Genres: Punk
- Years active: 1986–present
- Members: Villu Tamme; Reimo Va; Roland Sutt
- Past members: Mati Pors (deceased); Tarvo Hanno Varres; Venno Vanamölder; Tõnu Trubetsky; Lembit Krull; Ardo Põder; Sten Šeripov; Andres Aru; Kerti Alev AKA Promille; Livia Kurik
- Website: punk.bumpclub.ee/jmke/jmke.html

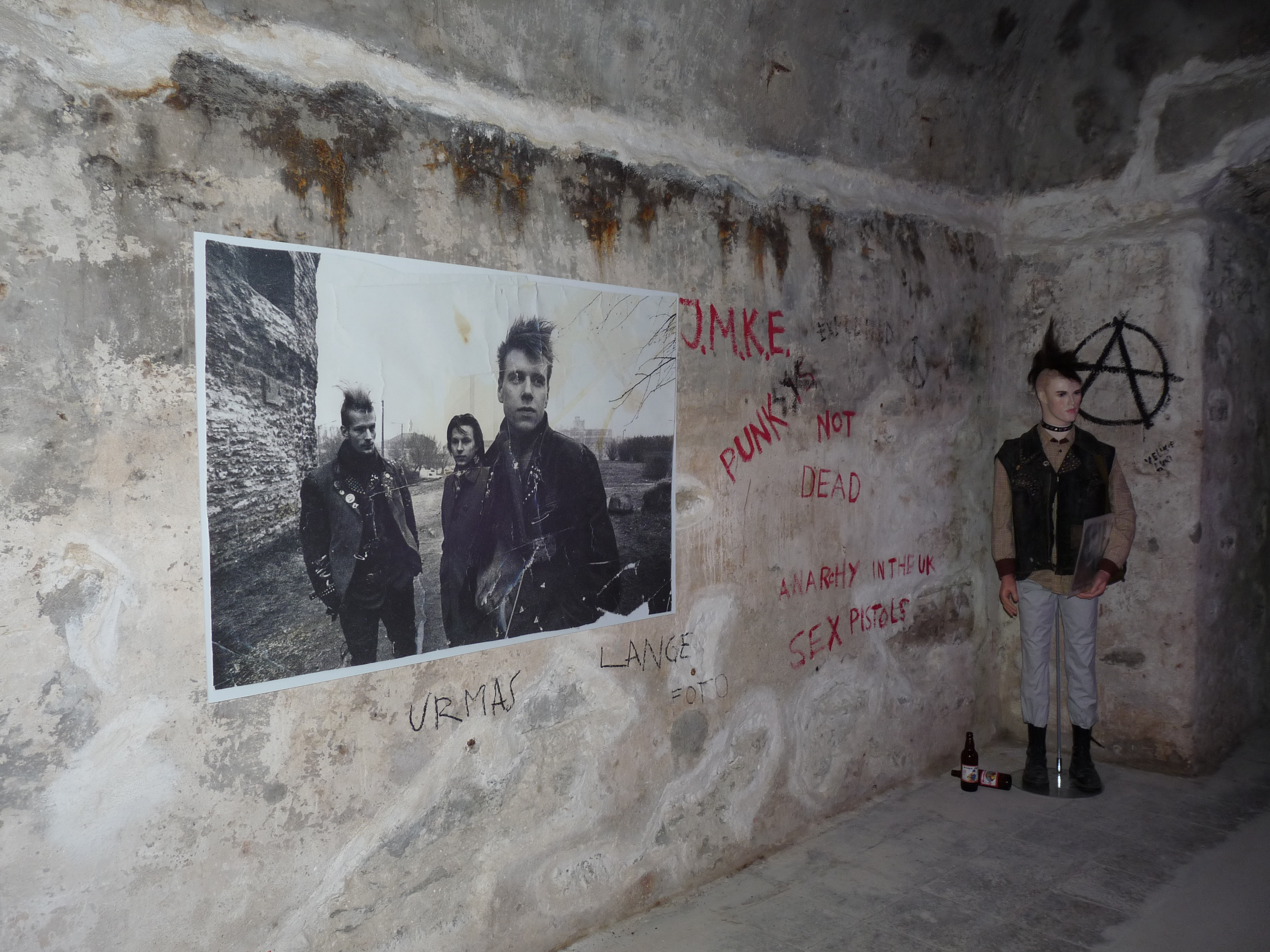
J.M.K.E. in the passages under a bastion near the Kiek in de Kök in Tallinn.

J.M.K.E. is an Estonian punk rock band, which formed in Tallinn on January 18, 1986.

== Biography ==
The original singer, Mati, left the band soon afterwards, leaving Venno on drums, Tarvo Hanno Varres on bass, and Villu Tamme on vocals and guitar, sometimes working together with guest singers (with Tõnu Trubetsky from Vennaskond playing under the name "Vürst Trubetsky & J.M.K.E."). For the first three years they mainly played concerts in Estonia, with a few also in Latvia, Lithuania and Russia. Later the band has toured Europe several times.

They became one of the more popular rock outfits in Estonia. In 1987 Villu wrote "Tere Perestroika", initially singing it alone with guitar. Later the band made numerous different versions of the song. It became a big hit because of its humorous topicality (Perestroika) and in 1988 won a song contest on a popular Estonian TV show. In 1988 came the first line-up change – Tarvo Hanno Varres left the band, later to join Estonian indie rock group Röövel Ööbik and a new bass player, Lembit, joined the band.

In 1989 the newly created Finnish record label Stupido Twins, with the aim of publishing some Estonian bands. J.M.K.E.'s "Tere Perestroika" was the first release. The winds of change in the Soviet Union had already blown some chains away, and so J.M.K.E. were able to travel abroad for the first time in April 1989, playing their first concert in Finland to middle-aged communists at the Leftist Forum in Helsinki. Later that autumn they recorded for Stupido Twins their first LP, Külmale Maale (To the Cold Country), which was the first Estonian rock record made abroad. Maximum Rock'n'Roll called it "absolutely excellent". At the end of 1989, Venno left the band declaring that J.M.K.E. had “Become too commercial for me”, and Ardo took his place.

The band toured Estonia, the Nordic countries, and Germany, made a couple of EPs, and only by 1993 started to record a new album, Gringode Kultuur (Culture of Gringos). Meanwhile, Estonia had regained its independence and J.M.K.E. couldn't continue with their anti-Soviet songs, so they found their new "enemy" in the invading "burger-culture", increasing poverty, and other early-capitalistic distresses. Lembit left the band in 1994 and was replaced by Sten. J.M.K.E. got also a new drummer, Andres.

Their third album, Sputniks in Pectopah ("Sputniks at Restaurant"), was released in 1995. The album is an eclectic collection of popular Russian songs, sung in high energy Russian. The cover versions include the national anthem of czarist Russia, old revolutionary marches, soldiers' songs from World War II, and melodies from popular cartoons.

In January 1996 J.M.K.E. celebrated their 10th birthday with the longest lasting concert of their history presenting on stage almost all persons who had ever played with the band, permanently or temporarily, and with a cassette-only-release, Rumal Nali (Silly Joke, on Fucking Cunt Records). This contained old D.I.Y. recordings mainly from 1986 and 1987. J.M.K.E. didn't make their first "tidy" studio recording until 1989 in Finland although by that stage they had enough songs for three or four albums. It was just impossible to release punk rock records under the vigilant glance of sickle and hammer.

J.M.K.E. have gradually abandoned their directly political slogans and now tell more varied stories than before. Their fifth album, Jäneste invasioon (Invasion of Rabbits, 1996), is a good example of their present character. Some consider it to be J.M.K.E.'s best product since "Külmale Maale".

In 2000, after 4 years of silence, the album Õhtumaa viimased tunnid was released. By then female back-up singers Livia Kurik ("Tirts") and Kerti Alev ("Promille Promille") joined the band; they left in 2012.

In 2006 J.M.K.E. released another album. This one for their 20th birthday, called Mälestusi Eesti NSV-st (A Memoir of the Estonian SSR). This includes songs that were recorded in a professional studio for the first time, for example "Ma ei saa sust aru", "Rumal nali", "Veri mullas" and many more.

In 2011, the album Jasonit ei huvita was released, which features a selection of cover songs. In 2012, drummer Roland Sutt joined the band. The albums Kirves, haamer, kühvel ja saag and Joon were released in 2016 and 2018, respectively.

== Discography ==
=== Studio albums ===
- Külmale maale (1989)
- Gringode kultuur (1993)
- Sputniks in Pectopah (1995)
- Rumal nali (1996)
- Jäneste invasioon (1996)
- Totally Estoned - The Best Of J.M.K.E (1997)
- Õhtumaa viimased tunnid (2000)
- Rotipüüdja (2000) (Vürst Trubetsky & J.M.K.E.)
- Ainult planeet (2002)
- Mälestusi Eesti NSV-st (2006)
- Jasonit ei huvita (2011)
- Kirves, haamer, kühvel ja saag (2016)
- Joon (mini-album, 2018)

=== EPs ===
- Tere perestroika (7-inch EP, 1989)
- Pieni mies, iso tuoppi (7-inch EP, 1990)
- Savist saar (12-inch EP, 1991)
- Maailmalõpp koju kätte (7-inch EP, 1993)
