= Vennaskond =

Estonian musical group

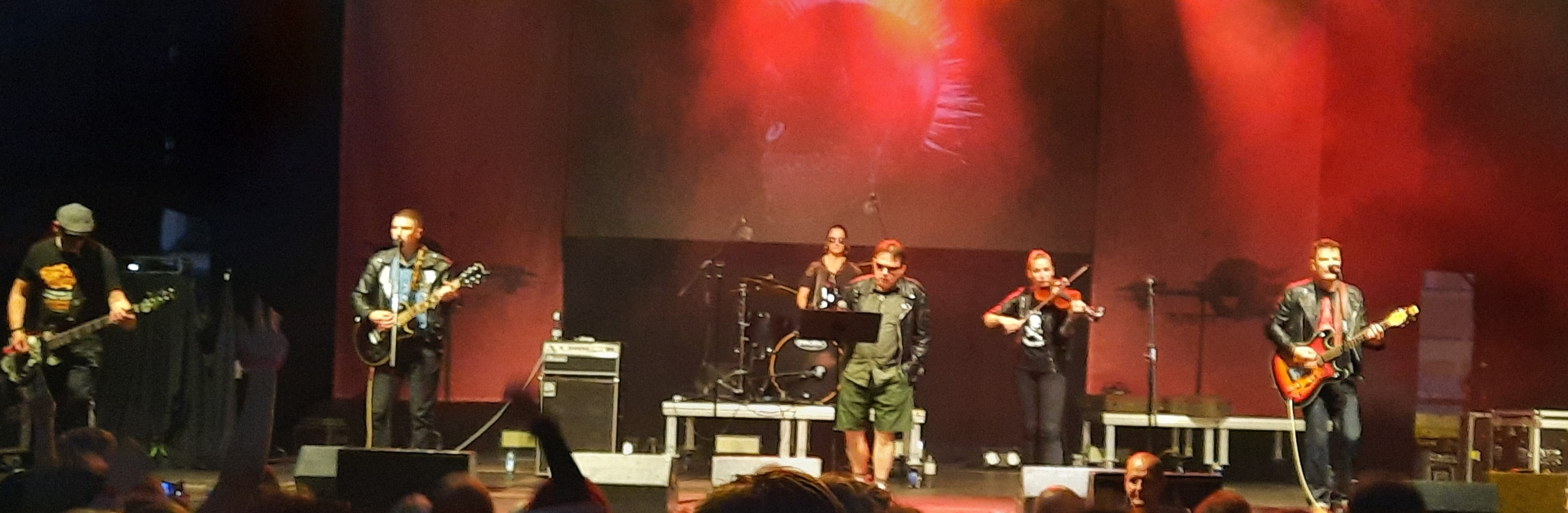

Background information
- Origin: Tallinn, Harju County, Estonia
- Genres: Punk rock, Post-punk, glam punk
- Years active: 1984–2006, 2007–present
- Labels: Vennaskond, Līgo
- Members: Tõnu Trubetsky; Allan Vainola; Anti Pathique; Hedwig Allika; Miina Kullamaa; Ed Edinburgh; Anneli Kadakas; Henry Leppnurm; Pexte Paxter
- Past members: See the section Former members
- Website: https://vennaskond1984.com

Vennaskond (Estonian for Brotherhood) is an Estonian punk rock band founded in 1984. The band has toured in Estonia, Finland, Latvia, Romania, Sweden, Germany, France, India, Poland and the United States (including CBGB). To show respect to the band, Metallica covered Vennaskond's hit song Insener Garini Hüperboloid (Engineer Garin's Hyperboloid) in Estonia in front of a 60 000 strong crowd during their gig in Tartu, Estonia on 18 July 2019. The band is explicitly anarchist, with many lyrics referring to historical anarchists. The frontman of the band, Tõnu Trubetsky, has been called "Estonia's leading anarchist".

== Members ==
- Tõnu Trubetsky (also known as Tony Blackplait) – vocals (since 1984)
- Roy Strider (:et) – guitar (since 2004)
- Allan Vainola – guitar (also Al Vainola; 1990–1996, 1996, 1998–2006, 2008, 2009–present)
- Anti Pathique – guitar, bass guitar (1987, 1989–1996, 2002–2005, 2008), bass guitar (since 2010)
- Hedwig Allika – violin (since 2006)
- Anneli Kadakas – percussion (since 2003)

=== Former members ===
The line-up of Vennaskond has changed frequently and often the same line-up has not even played two consecutive concerts. Only Tony Blackplait has been in the line-up since the first concert in 1984. An incomplete list of members includes:

- Teet Tibar – guitar (also Tips; 1984–1985, 1987, 1996–1997)
- Marco Rüütel – guitar (1984)
- Lauri Leis (also Ed Edinburgh) – bass guitar (sporadically since 2000)
- Tarmo Kruusimäe (also Kojamees or Juhan Tiik) – bass guitar (1984)
- Andrus Lomp – percussion (1984–1985, 1987–1988)
- Reet Nõgisto – bass guitar (1984)
- Richard Nool – percussion (also Riho Nool; 1984)
- Kalle Käo – guitar (1985)
- Toomas Leemets – percussion (1985)
- Jaan-Eik Tulve (also Sursu) – bass guitar (1985–1987)
- Martin Post – percussion (1985)
- Allan Hmelnitski – percussion (1985)
- Mait Re – percussion, guitar (also Matheus Senta; 1985–1988, 2005–2006)
- Andres Aru – percussion (also Mõmmi; 1986)
- Venno Vanamölder – percussion (1987–1989)
- Ivo Uukkivi (also Munk; 1987)
- Martin Süvari – bass guitar (1987)
- Mati Pors – bass guitar (also Mati Porss; 1987)
- Tom Kinkar – bass guitar (1987–1989)
- Koidu Jürisoo – violin (1987)
- Villu Tamme – guitar (1987)
- Margus Põldsepp – guitar (1988)
- Jüri Kłyszejko – guitar (1988–1989)
- Raul Saaremets – percussion (1988)
- Vadim Družkov – percussion (also Vadjah Lahari, Vadyah Lahary; 1988)
- Ivo Schenkenberg Jr – percussion (also Belka, Ivo Schenkenberg, real name Ivo Orav; 1988–1990)
- Kristjan Mäeots – percussion (also Kotkas; 1989, 1998, 1999–2000)
- Ira Vatsel – violin (1989)
- Ruth Saulski – violin (1989)
- Herbert Spencer Jr – bass guitar (1989)
- Kristian Müller – percussion (1989)
- Maarja Ora – violin (1989–1990)
- Mait Vaik – bass guitar (1989–1996, 1999)
- Hindrek Heibre – percussion (1989–1993)
- Ülari Ollik – accordion (also Mätas; 1990, 1993–1996)
- Max Sinister – bass guitar (real name Margus Müil; 1993)
- Rainis Kingu – percussion (1993–1998)
- Camille – violin (real name Imbi-Camille Rätsep; 1993–1998)
- Kaspar Jancis – guitar, bass guitar, piano, electric organ (1993–1998, 1999)
- Alar Aigro – bass guitar, sound (1997–1999, 2000–2001, 2003, 2005)
- Henn Rebane – accordion (1997)
- Tamur Marjasoo – guitar (1998)
- Catherine Matveus – violin (1998–2003)
- Rein Joasoo (1999)
- Margus Tamm (1999)
- Tuuliki Leinpere – violin (2003–2006)
- Pexte Paxter – percussion (a pseudonym, 2005)
- Angelica Awerianowa – violin (2006)
- Pet Creep – percussion (real name Peeter Proos, 2007, 2008)
- Henry Leppnurm – percussion (sporadically since 2004)

== Discography ==
=== Albums ===
- Ltn. Schmidt'i pojad (1991), Vennaskond – MC (The Sons of Ltn. Schmidt)
- Rockipiraadid (1992), Theka – MC (Rock Pirates)
- Usk. Lootus. Armastus. (1993), EHL Trading/Vennaskond – MC, CD; reissued with a different cover and track order as Insener Garini hüperboloid (1999), Vennaskond – MC (Faith. Hope. Love)
- Vaenlane ei maga (1993), Vennaskond – MC (The Enemy Does Not Sleep)
- Võluri tagasitulek (1994), Vennaskond – MC (Return of the Wizard)
- Inglid ja kangelased (1995), Vennaskond – MC, CD (Angels and Heroes)
- Mina ja George (1996), Vennaskond – MC, CD (Me and George)
- Reis Kuule (1997), Vennaskond – MC, CD (Trip to the Moon)
- Warszawianka (1999), HyperElwood – MC, CD
- Ma armastan Ameerikat (2001), DayDream Productions/Kaljukotkas/Remavert – MC, CD (I Love America)
- News from Nowhere (2001), Kaljukotkas/DayDream/Remavert – MC, CD
- Subway (2003), Vennaskond – CD
- Rīgas Kaos (2005), Līgo – LP
- Anarhia agentuur (2011), Elwood – CD (The Anarchy Agency)
- Linn Süütab Tuled (2014), Vennaskond – CD (The City Puts On The Lights)
- Rockpiraadid (2014), Līgo – LP (Rock Pirates)
- Vaenlane Ei Maga (2014), Līgo – LP (The Enemy Does Not Sleep)
- Võluri Tagasitulek (2014), Līgo – LP (Return of the Wizard)
- For Anarchists Resistance (2016) - CD

=== Compilations ===
- Priima (1999), HyperElwood – 2MC, 2CD

=== Vinyl single ===
- Girl in Black/Riga My Love (1991), Vennaskond – 7"

=== No. 1 Hits in Estonia ===
- "Insener Garini hüperboloid" (1993)
- "Lili Marleen" (1993)
- "Kopenhaagen" (1993)
- "Elagu Proudhon!" (1994)
- "Selle laulu mina ise luuletasin" (1994)
- "Pille-Riin" (1994)
- "Õhtud Moskva lähistel" (1995)
- "10203" (1995)
- "Subatlantiline kohtumine" (1996)
- "101. kilomeeter" (2000)
- "Saepurulapsed" (2001)
- "Ma armastan Ameerikat" (2002)

=== On compilations ===
- Balts Bite Back! (1993), Stupido Twins/Zona – MC, CD
- Rock. Pop in the East (1996), RFI – 2CD
- Europodium. Top of the European Pops (1997), RFI Musique – CD

== Films ==
- Millennium (1998) – dir Tõnu Trubetsky, VHS, 90 min, Faama Film/Eesti Tõsielufilm/Trubetsky Pictures
- I Love America (2001) – dir Tõnu Trubetsky, VHS, 140 min, DayDream Productions/Kaljukotkas/Trubetsky Pictures
- Sügis Ida-Euroopas (2004) – English: An Autumn in Eastern Europe, dir Tõnu Trubetsky, 2DVD, 185 min, Vennaskond/DayDream/Trubetsky Pictures
- New York (2006) – dir Tõnu Trubetsky, DVD, 140 min, Trubetsky Pictures
